= Pyramid power =

Pseudoscience belief that pyramids confer impossible powers

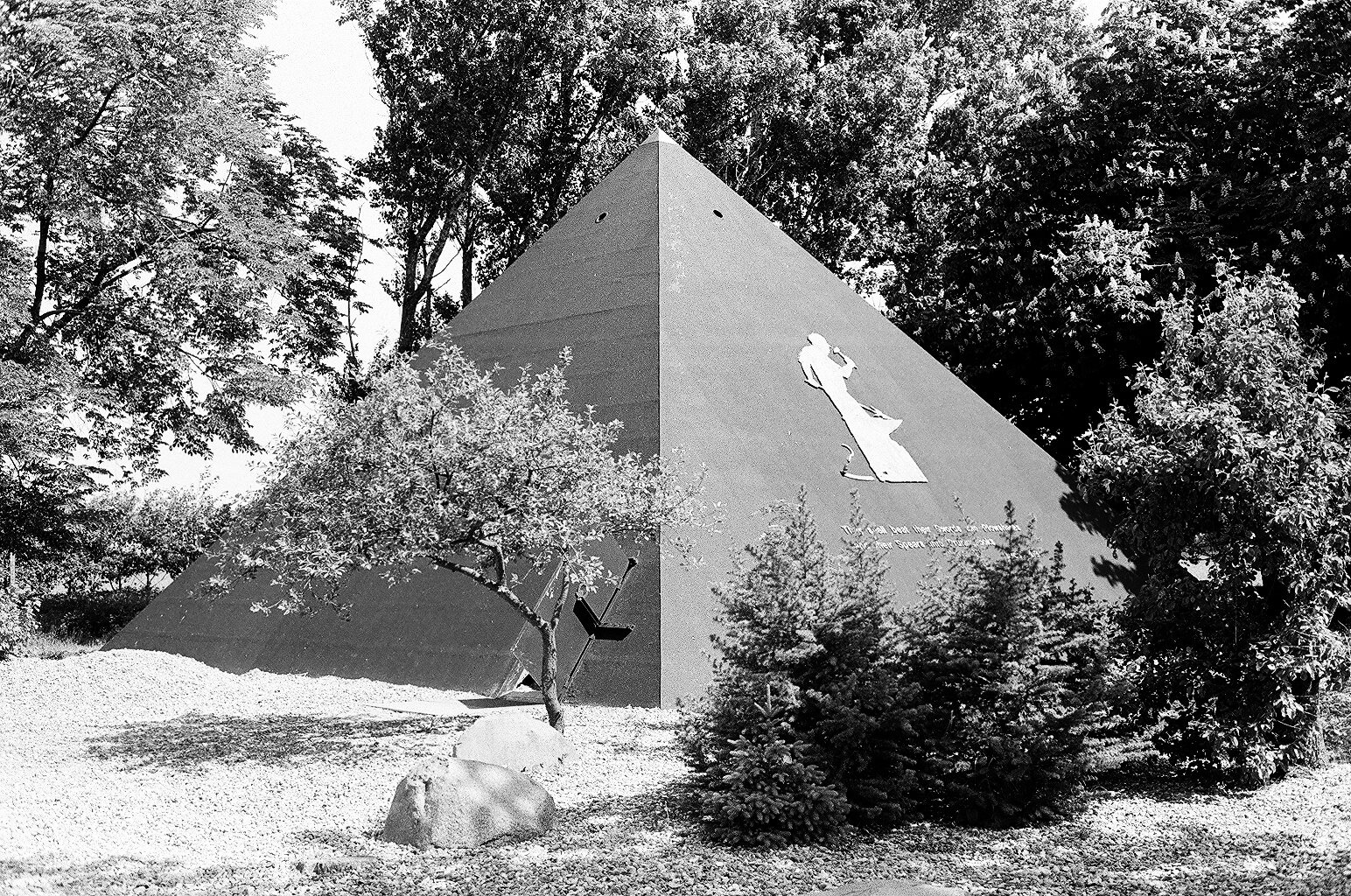
A pyramid constructed in Sejlflod, Denmark, in 1980, inspired by the work of Patrick Flanagan. Its owner claimed that spending time inside the pyramid could cure diseases, increase lifespans and improve the taste of wine.

Pyramid power is the pseudoscientific belief that the pyramids of ancient Egypt and objects of similar shape can confer a variety of benefits. Among these supposed properties are the ability to preserve foods, sharpen or maintain the sharpness of razor blades, improve health, function "as a thought-form incubator", trigger sexual urges, and cause other effects. Such unverified conjectures regarding pyramids are collectively known as pyramidology.

There is no evidence that pyramid power exists.

== History ==
In the 1930s, a French ironmonger and pendulum-dowsing author, Antoine Bovis, developed the idea that small models of pyramids can preserve food. The story persists that Bovis, while standing inside the King's Chamber of the Great Pyramid in Egypt, saw a garbage can inside the chamber piled with dead animals that had wandered into the structure, noticed that these small carcasses were not decaying and inferred that the structure somehow preserved them. However, Bovis never claimed to have visited Egypt. In his self-published French-language booklet Bovis ascribes his discovery to reasoning and experiments in Europe using a dowsing pendulum:

I have supposed that Egyptians were already very good dowsers and had oriented their pyramid by means of rod and pendulum. Being unable to go there to experiment and verify the radiations of the Keops Pyramid, I have built with cardboard some pyramids that you can see now, and I was astonished when, having built a regular pyramid and oriented it, I found the positive at the East, the negative at the West, and at the North and the South, dual-positive and dual-negative...

A new supposition: since with the help of our positive 2000° magnetic plates we can mummify small animals, could the pyramid have the same property? I tried, and as you can observe with the small fish and the little piece of meat still hanging, I succeeded totally.

In 1949, inspired by Bovis, a Czechoslovak named Karel Drbal applied for a patent on a "Pharaoh's shaving device", a model pyramid alleged to maintain the sharpness of razor blades. According to the patent (#91,304), "The method of maintaining the razor blades and straight razor blades sharp by placing them in the magnetic field in such a way that the sharp edge lies in the direction of the magnetic lines." Drbal alleged that his device would focus "the earth's magnetic field", although he did not make it clear how this would work, or whether the device's shape or materials exerted the effect.

Drbal's contention that razors could be sharpened or have their sharpness maintained by alignment with Earth's magnetic field was not new. In 1933, The Times carried letters claiming, "if I oriented my razor blades ... N. and S. by the compass ... they tend to last considerably longer" and "The idea of keeping razor blades in a magnetic field is not quite new. About the year 1900 I found this out".

Sheila Ostrander and Lynn Schroeder, authors of the paranormal, visited Czechoslovakia in 1968, where they happened upon a cardboard pyramid manufactured commercially by Drbal. They met Drbal, and dedicated a chapter of their popular 1970 book Psychic Discoveries Behind the Iron Curtain to pyramid power. This book introduced both the concept of pyramid power and the story about Antoine Bovis to the English-speaking world.

== Origin of the term ==
Debate continues over who coined the term "pyramid power". Author Max Toth has claimed he coined the phrase, as has Patrick Flanagan. Both authors released books entitled Pyramid Power in the 1970s. According to Toth, this led to a lawsuit by Flanagan against him.

However, the term "pyramid power" in its current usage first appeared in print in Sheila Ostrander and Lynn Schroeder's 1970 book Psychic Discoveries Behind the Iron Curtain. Ostrander and Schroeder claim that "Czechoslovak researchers" coined the term in the 1960s.

== Popularisation ==
The conjectures of pyramid power convinced the Onan Family, hotel and condo developers in Gurnee, Illinois, to build the "Pyramid House" in 1977.

Summerhill Pyramid Winery in Kelowna, British Columbia built a four-story replica of the Great Pyramid, alleged by the winery to improve the quality of wine aged within it.

A religion founded in 1975, called Summum, completed the construction of a pyramid called the Summum Pyramid in Salt Lake City, Utah in 1979.

Pyramid power was used by the Toronto Maple Leafs and their coach Red Kelly during the 1975–76 quarter-final series, to counter the Philadelphia Flyers' use of Kate Smith's rendering of "God Bless America". Kelly hung a plastic model of a pyramid in the team's clubhouse after a pair of away defeats at the start of the series, and each player took turns standing under it for exactly four minutes. The Maple Leafs managed to win all three of their home matches before losing the series' decisive game seven.

It is common in New Age magazines to see advertisements for open metal-poled pyramids large enough to meditate under. The New Age group Share International, founded by Benjamin Creme, practices a form of meditation called 'Transmission Meditation' using an open metal-poled tetrahedron, which according to their beliefs tunes into the cosmic energy of Maitreya and other spiritual masters.

== Skepticism ==
The neurologist and skeptic Terence Hines has written that pyramid power is a pseudoscience and tests have failed to provide any evidence for its claims:

Influenced by Erich von Däniken’s claims that Egyptian mummies had been preserved by some process unknown to science, pyramid power became quite a craze in the world of pseudoscience for a brief time in the mid-1970s. The idea was that the pyramidal shape itself was magical and filled with a mysterious energy and power ... Pyramid power claims have actually been tested. Alter (1973) and Simmons (1973) showed that pyramid-shaped containers were no more effective than any other shape at preserving organic matter (flowers or meat) placed in them. Nor did putting dull razor blades in a pyramid-shaped holder restore them to sharpness, contrary to a frequent claim of pyramid power promoters.

In 2005, an episode of MythBusters was aired on the Discovery Channel in which a basic test of pyramid power was performed, using pyramids built to the specifications found in pyramid power claims, reflecting the location of the King's Chamber in the Great Pyramid of Giza. Several claims were tested, concerning food rotting, a flower rotting and a razor blade going dull. With control protocols in place, there was no significant difference between items in pyramids and items outside.

== In popular culture ==
- Patrick Flanagan's book was featured on the cover and in the lyrics of The Alan Parsons Project's 1978 album Pyramid. "Pyramania", a song from the album, mocked the idea of pyramid power.
- Martin Gardner spoofed pyramid power in his "Mathematical Games" column in the Scientific American issue of June 1974, featuring his recurring fictional characters Dr. Matrix and Iva Matrix.
- Terry Pratchett's satiric fantasy novel Pyramids incorporates elements of the conjecture when an industry develops around pyramids' ability to manipulate time.

== See also ==
- List of topics characterized as pseudoscience
