= Pyramidology =

Various pseudoscientific speculations regarding pyramids

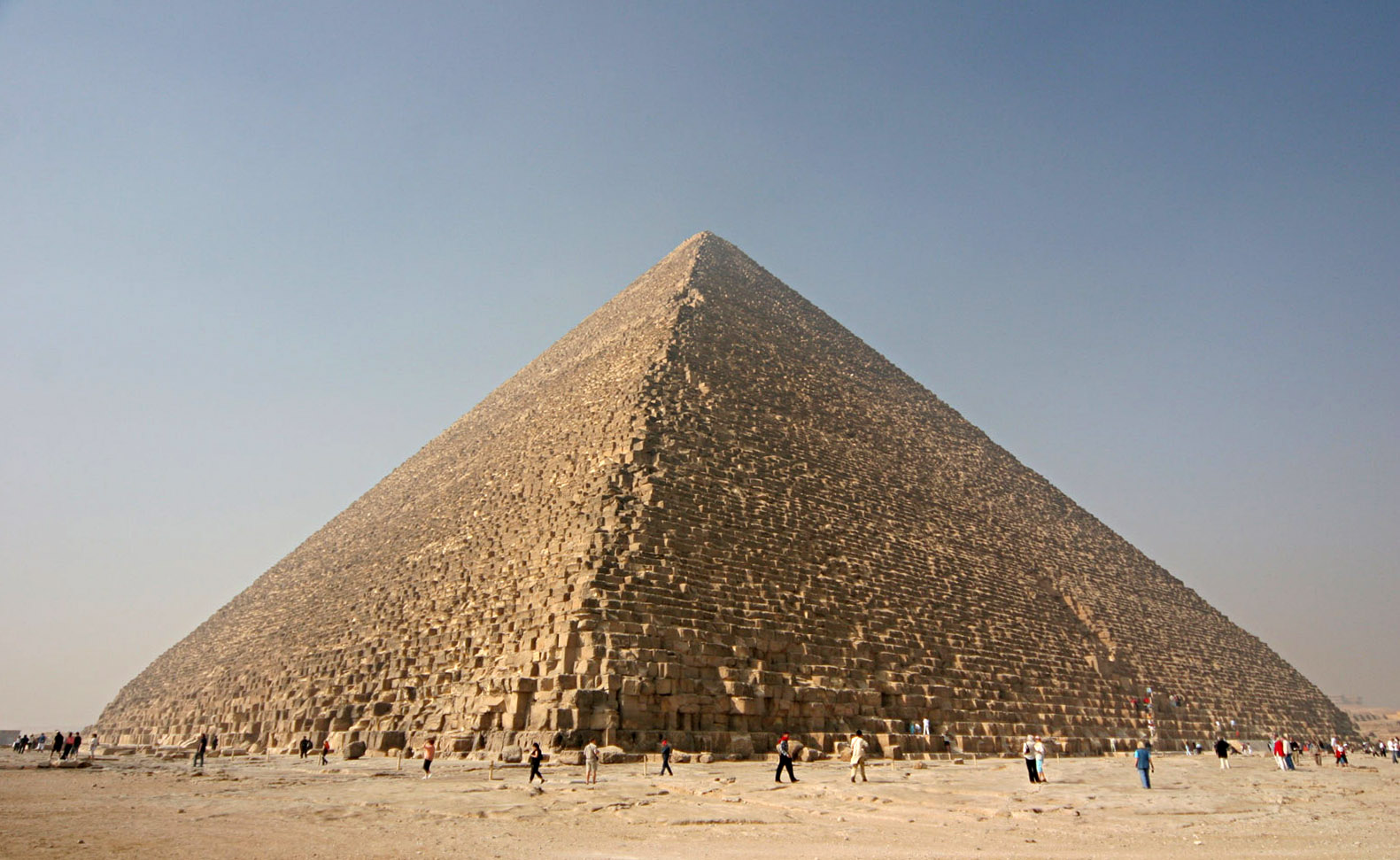
Great Pyramid of Giza

Pyramidology (or pyramidism) refers to various religious or pseudoscientific speculations regarding pyramids, most often the Giza pyramid complex and the Great Pyramid of Giza in Egypt. Some "pyramidologists" also concern themselves with the monumental structures of pre-Columbian America (such as Teotihuacan, the Mesoamerican Maya civilization, and the Inca of the South American Andes), and the temples of Southeast Asia.

Some pyramidologists claim that the Great Pyramid of Giza has encoded within it predictions for the Exodus of the Hebrews from Egypt, the crucifixion of Jesus, the start of World War I, the founding of modern-day Israel in 1948, and future events such as the beginning of Armageddon; this was discovered by using what they call "pyramid inches" to calculate the passage of time where one British inch equals one solar year.

Pyramidology reached its peak by the early 1980s. Interest revived in 1992 and 1993 when Rudolf Gantenbrink sent a remote-controlled robot up the air shafts of the Queen's Chamber.

== Types of pyramidology ==
The main types of pyramidological accounts involve one or more aspects which include:

- metrological: theories regarding the construction of the Great Pyramid of Giza by hypothetical geometric measurements
- numerological: theories that the measurements of the Great Pyramid and its passages have esoteric significance, and that their geometric measurements contain some encoded message. This form of pyramidology is popular within Christian Pyramidology (e.g. British Israelism and Bible Students).
- "pyramid power": claims originating in the late 1960s that pyramids as geometrical shapes possess supernatural powers
- pseudoarchaeological: varying theories that deny the pyramids were built to serve exclusively as tombs for the Pharaohs; alternative explanations regarding the construction of the pyramids (for example the use of long-lost knowledge; anti-gravity technology, etc.); and hypotheses that they were built by someone other than the historical Ancient Egyptians (e.g. early Hebrews, Aryans, Atlanteans, or extraterrestrial visitors).

== History ==
=== Metrological ===
Metrological pyramidology dates to the 17th century. John Greaves, an English mathematician, astronomer and antiquarian, first took precise measurements of the Great Pyramid at Giza using the best mathematical instruments of the day. His data was published in Pyramidographia (1646) which theorized a geometric cubit was used by the builders of the Great Pyramid (see: Egyptian royal cubit). While Greave's measurements were objective, his metrological data was later misused by numerologists:

J. Greaves in his Pyramidographia, 1646, made an objective description of these structures, but using his measurements, some philosophers started to propose a more subjective reading of them: Kircher suggested that they had mystical and hidden meanings; Th. Shaw thought the Great Pyramid was a temple to Osiris; I. Newton created the concept of "sacred code" to denote one of the two supposed instruments used to erect them.

Abu'l-Barakat Al-Baghdadi

The Arab polymath Abd al-Latif al-Baghdadi (1163–1231) studied the pyramid with great care, and in his Account of Egypt, he praises them as works of engineering genius. In addition to measuring the structure, alongside the other pyramids at Giza, al-Baghdadi also writes that the structures were surely tombs, although he thought the Great Pyramid was used for the burial of Agathodaimon or Hermes. Al-Baghdadi ponders whether the pyramid pre-dated the Great flood as described in Genesis, and even briefly entertained the idea that it was a pre-Adamic construction.

=== John Taylor and the golden ratio ===
In the mid-19th century, Friedrich Röber studied various Egyptian pyramids (Note: Including the Pyramid of Khafre, that of Menkaure, and some of the Giza, Saqqara, and Abusir groups) which he linked to the golden ratio. This led pyramidologist John Taylor to theorize in his 1859 book The Great Pyramid: Why Was It Built and Who Built It? that the Great Pyramid of Giza is related to the golden ratio as well. Although the Great Pyramid's measurements have been found to be within the margin of error, the connections between ancient Egypt and the golden ratio have been explained by modern scholars as coincidental, as no other knowledge of the golden ratio is known from before the fifth century BC.

Taylor also proposed that the inch used to build the Great Pyramid was 1/25 of the "sacred cubit" (whose existence had earlier been postulated by Isaac Newton). Taylor was also the first to claim that the pyramid was divinely inspired, contained a revelation and was built not by the Egyptians, but instead by the Hebrews, pointing to Biblical passages (Is. 19: 19–20; Job 38: 5–7) to support his theories. For this reason Taylor is often credited as being the "founder of pyramidology". Martin Gardner noted:

... it was not until 1859 that Pyramidology was born. This was the year that John Taylor, an eccentric partner in a London publishing firm, issued his The Great Pyramid: Why was it Built? And Who Built it? ... Taylor never visited the Pyramid, but the more he studied its structure, the more he became convinced that its architect was not an Egyptian, but an Israelite acting under divine orders. Perhaps it was Noah himself.

=== Christian pyramidology ===
==== British Israelism ====
Taylor influenced the Astronomer Royal of Scotland Charles Piazzi Smyth, F.R.S.E., F.R.A.S., who made numerous numerological calculations on the pyramid and published them in a 664-page book Our Inheritance in the Great Pyramid (1864) followed by Life, and Work in the Great Pyramid (1867). These two works fused pyramidology with British Israelism and Smyth first linked the hypothetical pyramid inch to the British Imperial Unit system.

This diagram from Charles Piazzi Smyth's Our Inheritance in the Great Pyramid (1864) shows some of his measurements and chronological determinations made from them.

Smyth's theories were later expanded upon by early 20th century British Israelites such as Colonel Garnier (Great Pyramid: Its Builder & Its Prophecy, 1905), who began to theorise that chambers within the Great Pyramid contain prophetic dates which concern the future of the British, Celtic, or Anglo-Saxon peoples. However this idea originated with Robert Menzies, an earlier correspondent of Smyth's. David Davidson with H. Aldersmith wrote The Great Pyramid, Its Divine Message (1924) and further introduced the idea that Britain's chronology (including future events) may be unlocked from inside the Great Pyramid. This theme is also found in Basil Stewart's trilogy on the same subject: Witness of the Great Pyramid (1927), The Great Pyramid, Its Construction, Symbolism and Chronology (1931) and History and Significance of the Great Pyramid ... (1935). More recently a four-volume set entitled Pyramidology was published by British Israelite Adam Rutherford (released between 1957–1972). British Israelite author E. Raymond Capt also wrote Great Pyramid Decoded in 1971 followed by Study in Pyramidology in 1986.

==== Joseph A. Seiss ====
Joseph Seiss was a Lutheran minister who was a proponent of pyramidology. He wrote A Miracle in Stone: or, The Great Pyramid of Egypt in 1877. His work was popular with contemporary evangelical Christians.

==== Charles Taze Russell ====
In 1891 pyramidology reached a global audience when it was integrated into the works of Charles Taze Russell, founder of the Bible Student movement. Russell however denounced the British-Israelite variant of pyramidology in an article called The Anglo-Israelitish Question. Adopting Joseph Seiss's designation that the Great Pyramid of Giza was "the Bible in stone" Russell taught that it played a special part in God's plan during the "last days" basing his interpretation on Isaiah 19:19–20: "In that day shall there be an altar (pile of stones) to the Lord in the midst of the land of Egypt, and a pillar (Hebrew matstebah, or monument) at the border thereof to the Lord. And it shall be for a sign, and for a witness unto the Lord of Hosts in the land of Egypt." Two brothers, archaeologists John and Morton Edgar, as personal associates and supporters of Russell, wrote extensive treatises on the history, nature, and prophetic symbolism of the Great Pyramid in relation to the then known archaeological history, along with their interpretations of prophetic and Biblical chronology. They are best known for their two-volume work Great Pyramid Passages and Chambers, published in 1910 and 1913.

Although most Bible Student groups, which branched off from the original, continue to support and endorse the study of pyramidology from a Biblical perspective, the Bible Students associated with the Watchtower Society, who chose ’Jehovah's Witnesses’ as their new name in 1931, have abandoned pyramidology entirely since 1928.

=== Pyramid power ===
Another set of speculations concerning pyramids have centered upon the possible existence of an unknown energy concentrated in pyramidical structures.

Pyramid energy was popularized in the early 1970s, particularly by New Age authors such as Patrick Flanagan (Pyramid Power: The Millennium Science, 1973), Max Toth and Greg Nielsen (Pyramid Power, 1974) and Warren Smith (Secret Forces of the Pyramids, 1975). These works focused on the alleged energies of pyramids in general, not solely the Egyptian pyramids. Toth and Nielsen for example reported experiments where "seeds stored in pyramid replicas germinated sooner and grew higher".

=== Modern pyramidology ===
==== Alan F. Alford ====
Author Alan F. Alford interprets the entire Great Pyramid in the context of ancient Egyptian religion. Alford takes as his starting point the golden rule that the pharaoh had to be buried in the earth, i.e. at ground level or below, and this leads him to conclude that Khufu was interred in an ingeniously concealed cave whose entrance is today sealed up in the so-called Well Shaft adjacent to a known cave called the Grotto. He has lobbied the Egyptian authorities to explore this area of the pyramid with ground penetrating radar.

The cult of creation theory also provided the basis for Alford's next idea: that the sarcophagus in the King's Chamber, commonly supposed to be Khufu's final resting place, actually enshrined iron meteorites. He maintains, by reference to the Pyramid Texts, that this iron was blasted into the sky at the time of creation, according to the Egyptians' geocentric way of thinking. Alford says the King's Chamber, with its upward inclined dual "airshafts", was built to capture the magic of this mythical moment.

Alford's most speculative idea is that the King's Chamber generated low frequency sound via its "airshafts", the purpose being to re-enact the sound of the earth splitting open at the time of creation.

==== India ====
Various spiritual organizations in India have used pyramids as a means to promote theories of their potency. Numerous papers have been published in an Indian science journal called the Indian Journal of Traditional Knowledge by the Council of Scientific and Industrial Research.

== Pseudoarchaeology ==
Lewis Spence in his An Encyclopaedia of Occultism (1920) summed up the earliest pseudoarcheological claims:

... in the 1880s, Ignatius Donnelly had suggested that the Great Pyramid had been built by the descendants of the Atlanteans. That idea was picked up in the 1920s by Manly Palmer Hall who went on to suggest that they were the focus of the ancient Egyptian wisdom schools. Edgar Cayce built upon Hall's speculations.

Ignatius Donnelly and later proponents of the hyperdiffusionist view of history claimed that all pyramid structures across the world had a common origin. Donnelly claimed this common origin was in Atlantis, while Grafton Elliot Smith claimed Egypt, writing: "Small groups of people, moving mainly by sea, settled at certain places and there made rude imitations of the Egyptian monuments of the Pyramid Age."

=== Ancient astronauts ===
Several proponents of ancient astronauts claim that the Great Pyramid of Giza was constructed by extraterrestrials, or influenced by them. Proponents include Erich von Däniken, Robert Charroux, W. Raymond Drake, and Zecharia Sitchin. According to Erich Von Däniken, the Great Pyramid has advanced numerological properties which could not have been known to the ancient Egyptians and so must have been passed down by extraterrestrials: "... the height of the pyramid of Cheops, multiplied by a thousand million ... corresponds approximately to the distance between the Earth and the sun."

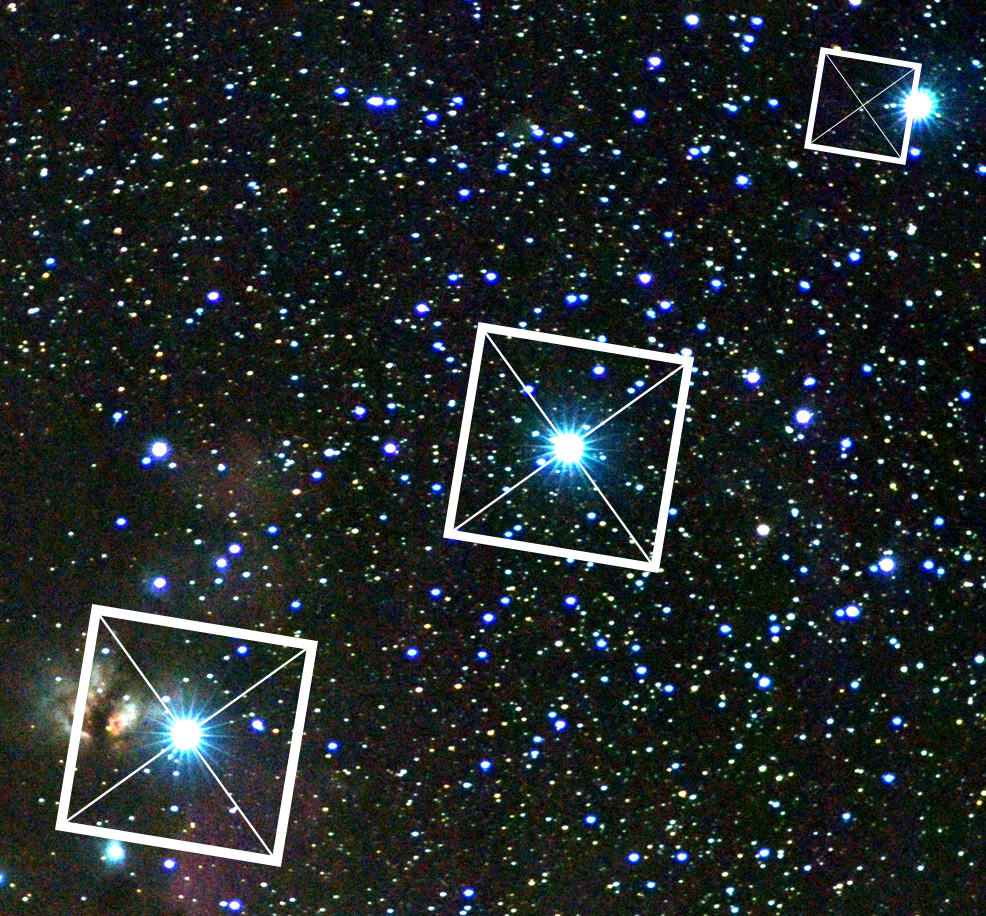
Central tenet of the OCT: outline of the Giza pyramids superimposed over Orion's Belt

=== Orion correlation theory ===
Robert Bauval and Graham Hancock (1996) have both suggested that the "ground plan" of the three main Egyptian pyramids was physically established c. 10,500 BC, but that the pyramids were built around 2,500 BC. This theory was based on their initial claims regarding the alignment of the Giza pyramids with Orion are later joined with speculation about the age of the Great Sphinx.

==== Advanced technology ====
Linked to the pseudoarchaeological ancient astronaut theory and Orion correlation theory are related claims that the Great Pyramid was constructed by the use of an advanced lost technology. Proponents of this theory often link this hypothetical advanced technology to extraterrestrials but also Atlanteans, Lemurians or a legendary lost race. Notable proponents include Christopher Dunn and David Hatcher Childress. Graham Hancock, in his 1995 book Fingerprints of the Gods, assigned the 'ground plan' of the three main Egyptian pyramids, in his theory of an advanced progenitor civilization which possessed advanced technology.

=== Water shaft theory ===
According to the water shaft hypothesis, flotations are attached to a stone block. The first gate is opened and the block is floated into the shaft. The first gate is closed, then the second gate is opened, allowing the block to float to the top of the shaft. Finally, the second gate is closed and the third gate is opened, allowing workers to float the block out of the shaft.

The water shaft theory speculates that canal-like technology may have been used not just to transport blocks to the site, but to actually raise the blocks to the top of the pyramid as well. Under this scenario, flotations would be attached to a block and the block would be floated into the bottom of a water-filled shaft. A series of locks would then allow the block to be floated up the sealed water shaft to the top of the pyramid.

== Criticism ==
In 1880, the renowned Egyptologist Flinders Petrie went to Egypt to perform new measurements of the Great Pyramid, and wrote that he found that the pyramid was several feet smaller than previously believed by John Taylor and Charles Piazzi Smyth. Flinders therefore claimed that the hypothetical pyramid inch of the pyramidologists had no basis in truth, and published his results in "The Pyramids and Temples of Gizeh" (1883), writing: "there is no authentic example, that will bear examination, of the use or existence of any such measure as a 'Pyramid inch', or of a cubit of 25.025 British inches." Proponents of the pyramid inch, especially British Israelites, responded to Petrie's discoveries and claimed to have found flaws in them. Petrie refused to respond to these criticisms, claiming he had disproved the pyramid inch and compared continuing proponents to "flat earth believers":

It is useless to state the real truth of the matter, as it has no effect on those who are subject to this type of hallucination. They can but be left with the flat earth believers and other such people to whom a theory is dearer than a fact.

In 1930, Belgian Egyptologists Jean Capart and Marcelle Werbrouck stated that "with the help of mathematicians – and often mingling with them – mystics have invented what might be called the 'religion of the pyramids'". Six years later, Adolf Erman complained of the fact that certain theories were still proposed, even though a century of research would have long since debunked all of them. R. A. Schwaller de Lubicz (1887-1961), who spent a dozen years investigating these structures, was one such crank.

On 24 January 1937, Gustave Jéquier chose to expose his criticism of the pyramidology assumptions on a mass media, the newspaper Gazette de Lausanne, lamenting that "these speculations didn't deserve the resonance they have had" and warning the audience against "prophecies incurred by arguments masked as science, when the very foundations of these reasonings, cleverly disguised, are nothing but inaccurate news or simple hypotheses and that the whole argument is clearly tendentious".

In 1964 Barbara Mertz, reflecting the views of the scientific establishment, reported:

Even in modern times when people, one would think, should know better, the Great Pyramid of Giza has proved a fertile field for fantasy. The people who do not know better are the Pyramid mystics, who believe that the Great Pyramid is a gigantic prophecy in stone, built by a group of ancient adepts in magic. Egyptologists sometimes uncharitably refer to this group as "Pyramidiots", but the school continues to flourish despite scholarly anathemas.

The Toronto Society for Psychical Research organized a research team consisting of Allan Alter (B.Sc. Phm) and Dale Simmons (Dip. Engr. Tech) to explore claims made in Pyramid Power literature that pyramids could better preserve organic matter. Extensive tests showed that pyramid containers "are no more effective than those of other shapes in preserving and dehydrating organic material".

French Egyptologist and architect Jean-Philippe Lauer undertook a scientific analysis of several pyramidologists' claims by reconstructing their reasoning step-by-step and redoing their mathematical calculations. In 1974, he concluded that those intuitions, though fascinating and made by people in good faith, have little to no regard to archaeology needs, if not to any other science at all.

== See also ==
- List of topics characterized as pseudoscience
- Egyptian pyramid construction techniques
- Summum
- Alexander Golod
