= Marcelle Baud =

French Egyptologist and Artist

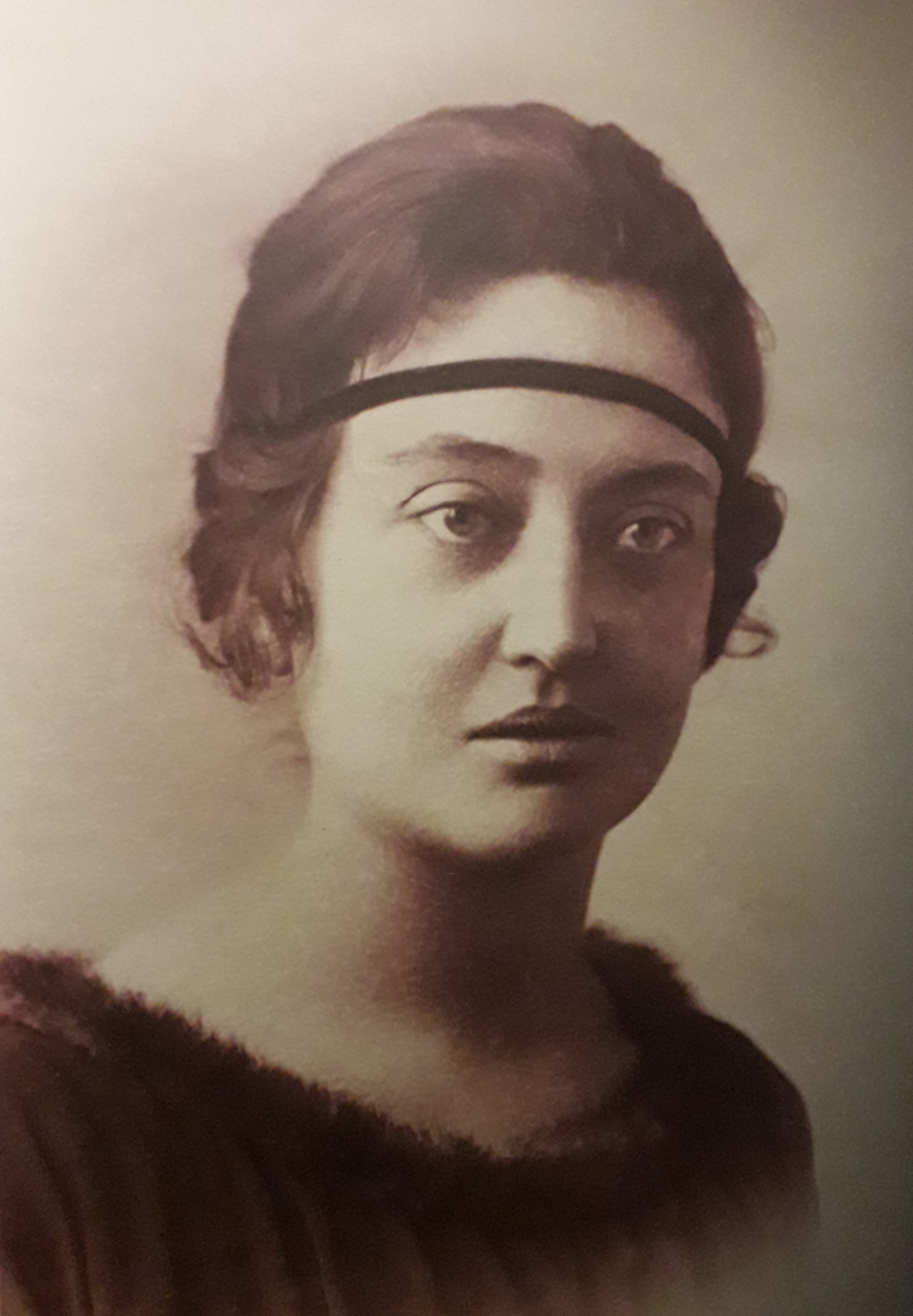
- Marcelle Baud
- Born: 28 November 1890; Paris
- Died: 13 February 1987 (aged 96); Mailhat
- Resting place: Issoire
- Occupations: Egyptologist and artist
- Parent(s): Antoine Baud and Marthe Julie Adèle Morel

Academic background
- Education: Académie Julian, Beaux-Arts, École du Louvre
- Thesis: Les Dessins ébauchés de la Nécropole Thébaine (au Temps du Nouvel Empire)

Academic work
- Institutions: Institut Français d'Archéologie Orientale

Marcelle Gabrielle Baud (28 November 1890 - 13 February 1987) was a French Egyptologist and artist.

== Early life ==
Marcelle Gabrielle Baud was born in the XI arrondissement of Paris on 28 November 1890 to Antoine Baud (artist) and Marthe Julie Adèle Morel, who was the daughter of Charles Numa Morel (artist). She began drawing with her grandfather at age 9 and, from age 10, began assisting her father.

== Education ==
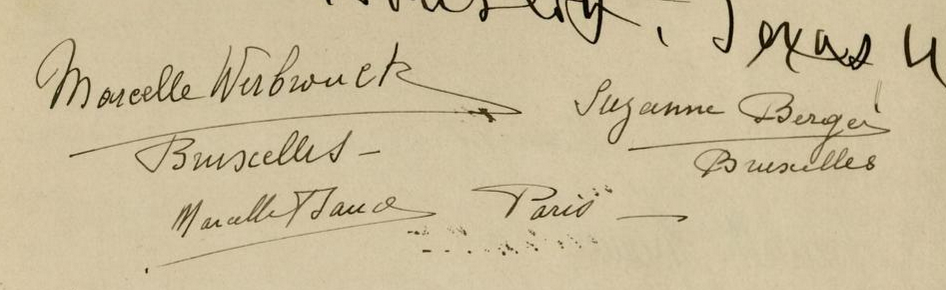
Baud, Suzanne Berger and Werbrouck's signatures in the Nahman Visitor Guestbook.

She attended Académie Julian and at 18, she entered the Beaux-Arts. In 1911, she started her three years of studying Egyptology at the École du Louvre, during which time she wrote her thesis, entitled Les Dessins ébauchés de la Nécropole Thébaine (au Temps du Nouvel Empire). She studied alongside Étienne Drioton, and it is likely the place where she met and became friends with Marcelle Werbrouck.

During her studies at École du Louvre, she studied with Georges Bénédite, a Hellenist, and noticed that the poor quality of his documentation of images and began to draw for him. In 1920, Benedite found her a place at the Institut Français d'Archéologie Orientale (IFAO), where she was the first woman to be an attaché.

== Career ==
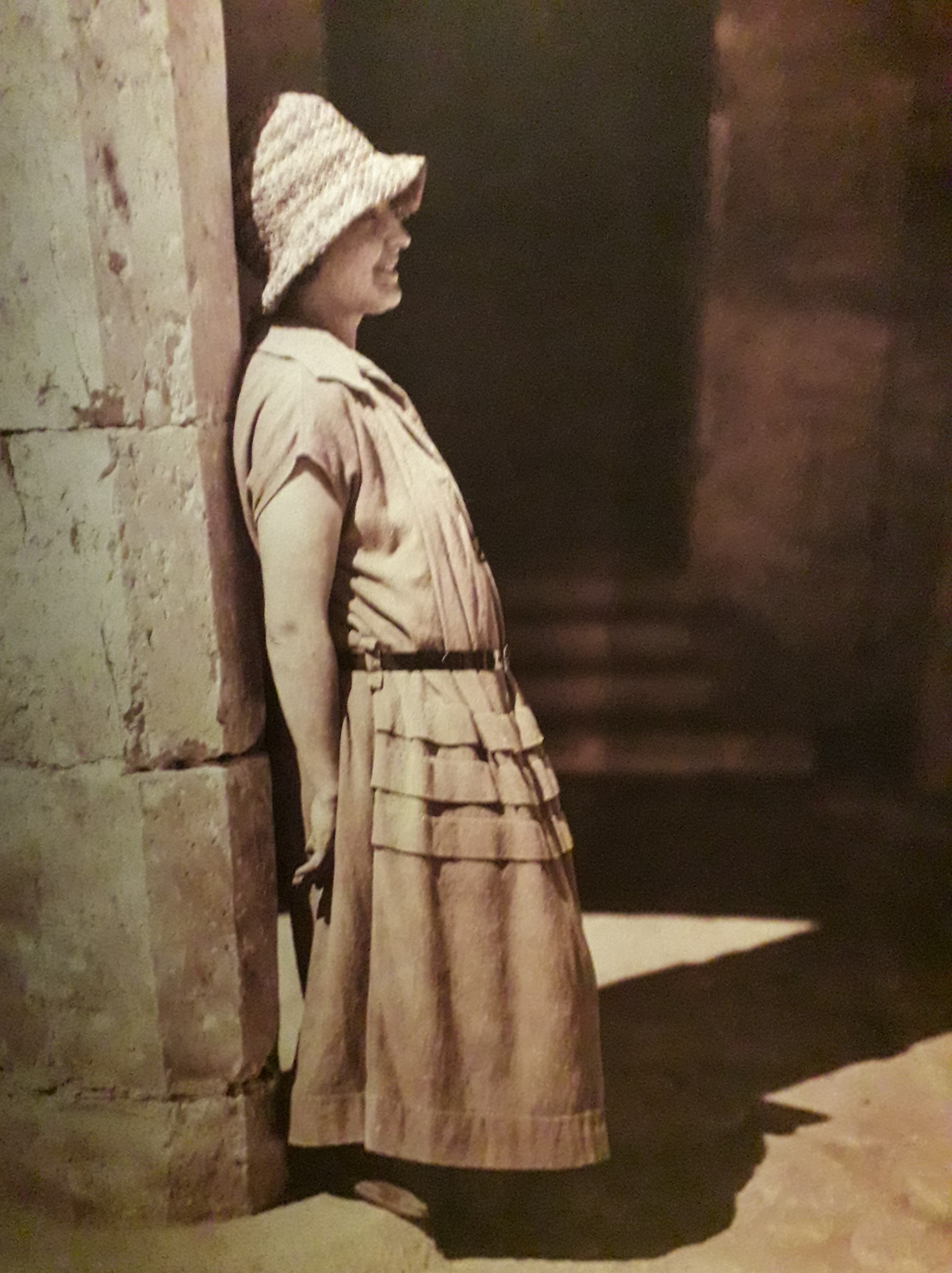
Marcelle Baud in Egypt from the exhibition, Traits d'Egypte: Marcelle Baud (1890-1987), Musée Bargoin

Baud worked on sites across Egypt as a copyist, and particularly worked with the Belgian Egyptologists, Marcelle Werbrouck and Jean Capart. In 1922, she was the second woman to enter the Tomb of Tutankhamun.

Her illustrations from Theban Tombs was exhibited in the Louvre for a month. In 1926–1927, she was asked by Capart, then curator in Royal Museums of Art and History in Brussels, to reproduce paintings from the Tomb of Nakht in the style of Robert Hays. Capart recommended Baud to produce illustrations for the Brooklyn Museum.

Her book, Les dessins ébauches de la necropole thebaine, which was published in 1935, remains a key volume studying the techniques of drawing in ancient Egypt. Just prior to the Second World War starting she was invited to rewrite Hachette's Guide Bleu Egypte and completely rewrote it by 1956. In 1956, she also returned to Egypt with Werbrouck, which would be Werbrouck's last time.

== Involvement with the Soroptimist movement ==
During the 1930s, she became a founding member of the club for Soroptimists in Paris, and she encouraged Werbrouck to set up the branch in Brussels. After the war, Ripa de Roveredo asked for her help in the development of Soroptimists clubs in France. Baud set up clubs across Auvergne, starting with two in Clermont-Ferrand (1954) and Issoire (1955).

== Publications ==
Baud wrote and illustrated several volumes:

=== Illustrated ===
- Werbrouck, M. (1938). Les Pleureuses dans l'Egypte ancienne.
- Capart, J. (1950). Tout-Ankh-Amon

=== Wrote and Illustrated ===
- Baud, M. (1935). Les dessins ébauches de la necropole thebaine.
- Baud, M. and Parisot, M. (1956). Guide Bleu Egypte.
- Baud, M. (1978) Le caractère du dessin en Egypte ancienne.

== Exhibitions ==
- January- February 1926: Documents d’art égyptien, dessins de tombeaux thébains de la 18^{e} à la 26^{e} dynastie, Paris, Musée des Arts décoratifs.
- 24 April - 9 June 1990: Marcelle Baud: de l’Égypte à l'Auvergne, Clermont-Ferrand, Musée du Ranquet.
- 6 July 2021 - 9 January 2022: Traits d’Égypte, Marcelle Baud (1890-1987), Clermont-Ferrand, Musée Bargoin.

== Gallery of Works ==
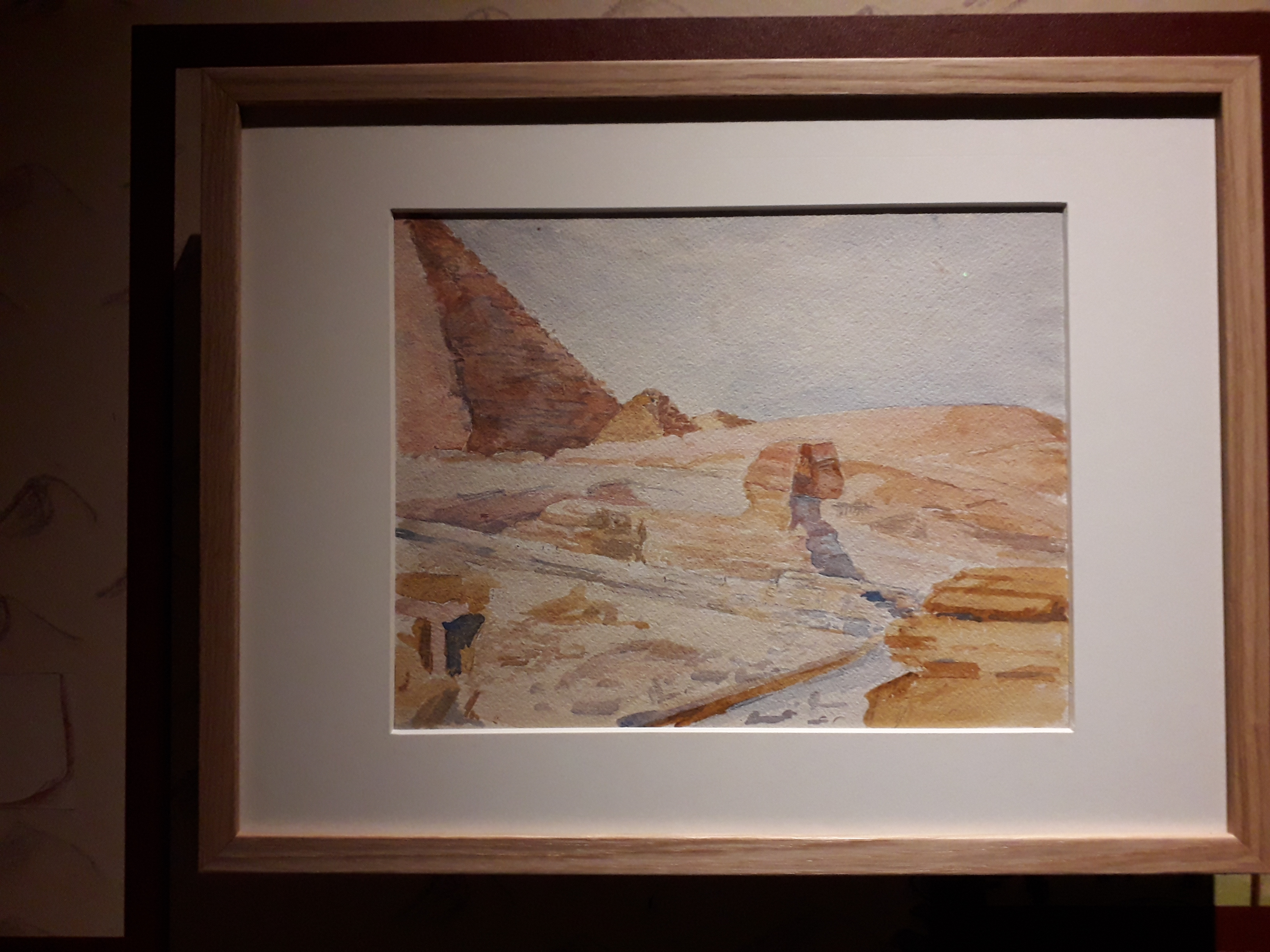
Baud, Marcelle. Giza. Watercolour. Traits d'Egypte: Marcelle Baud (1890-1987), Musée Bargoin.

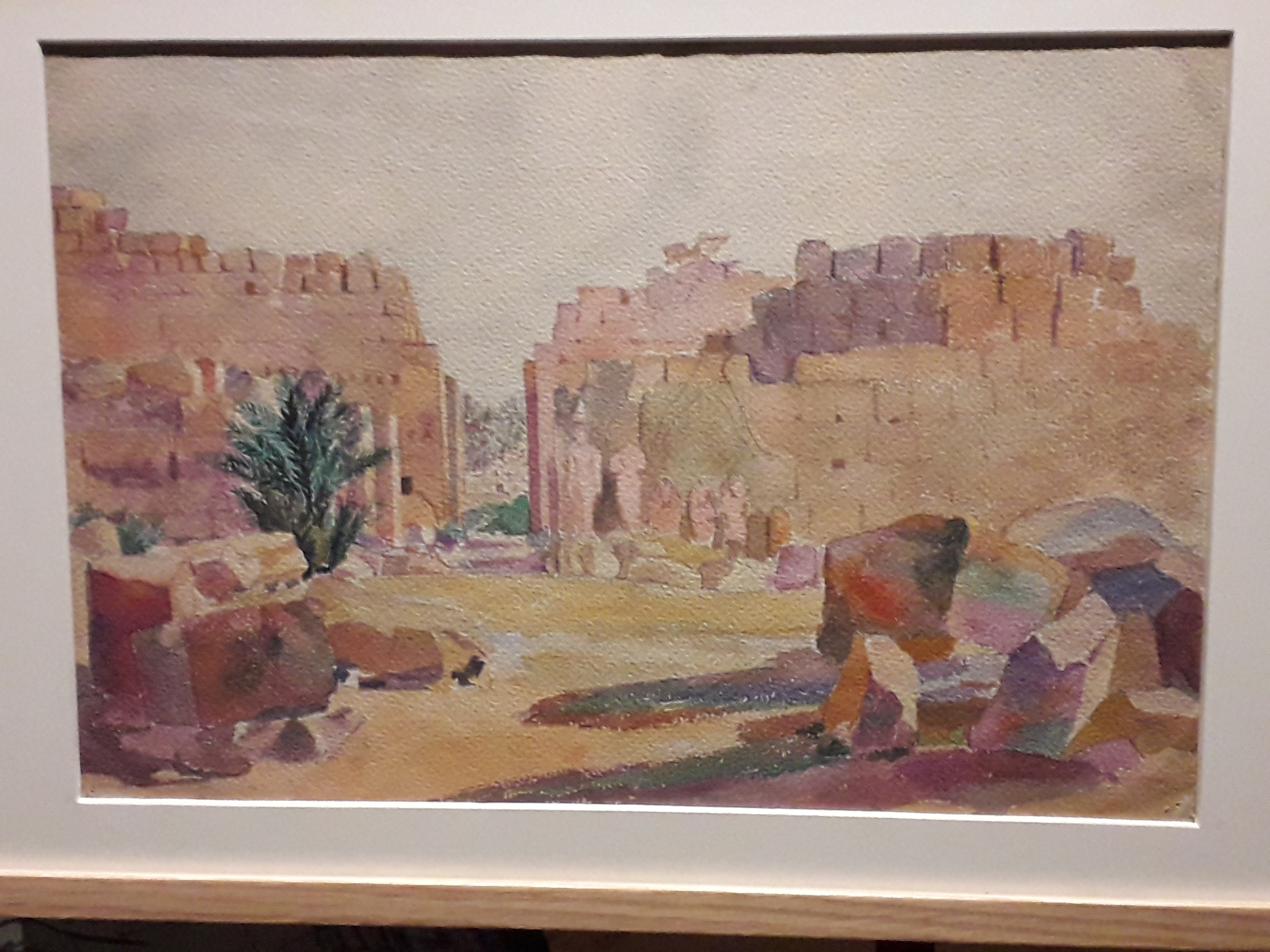
Baud, Marcelle. Karnak. Watercolour. Traits d'Egypte: Marcelle Baud (1890-1987), Musée Bargoin.

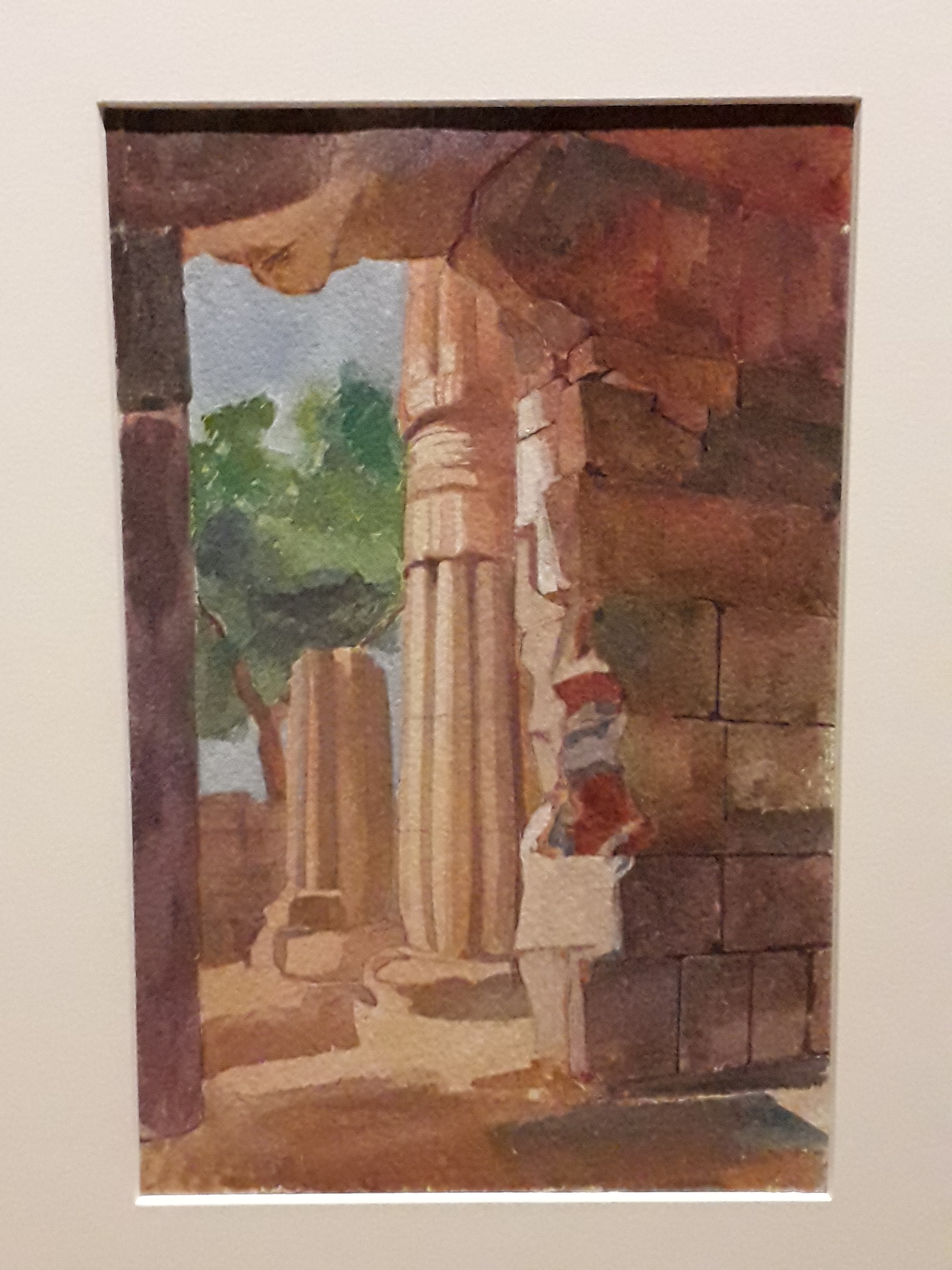
Baud, Marcelle. Luxor. Watercolour. Traits d'Egypte: Marcelle Baud (1890-1987), Musée Bargoin.

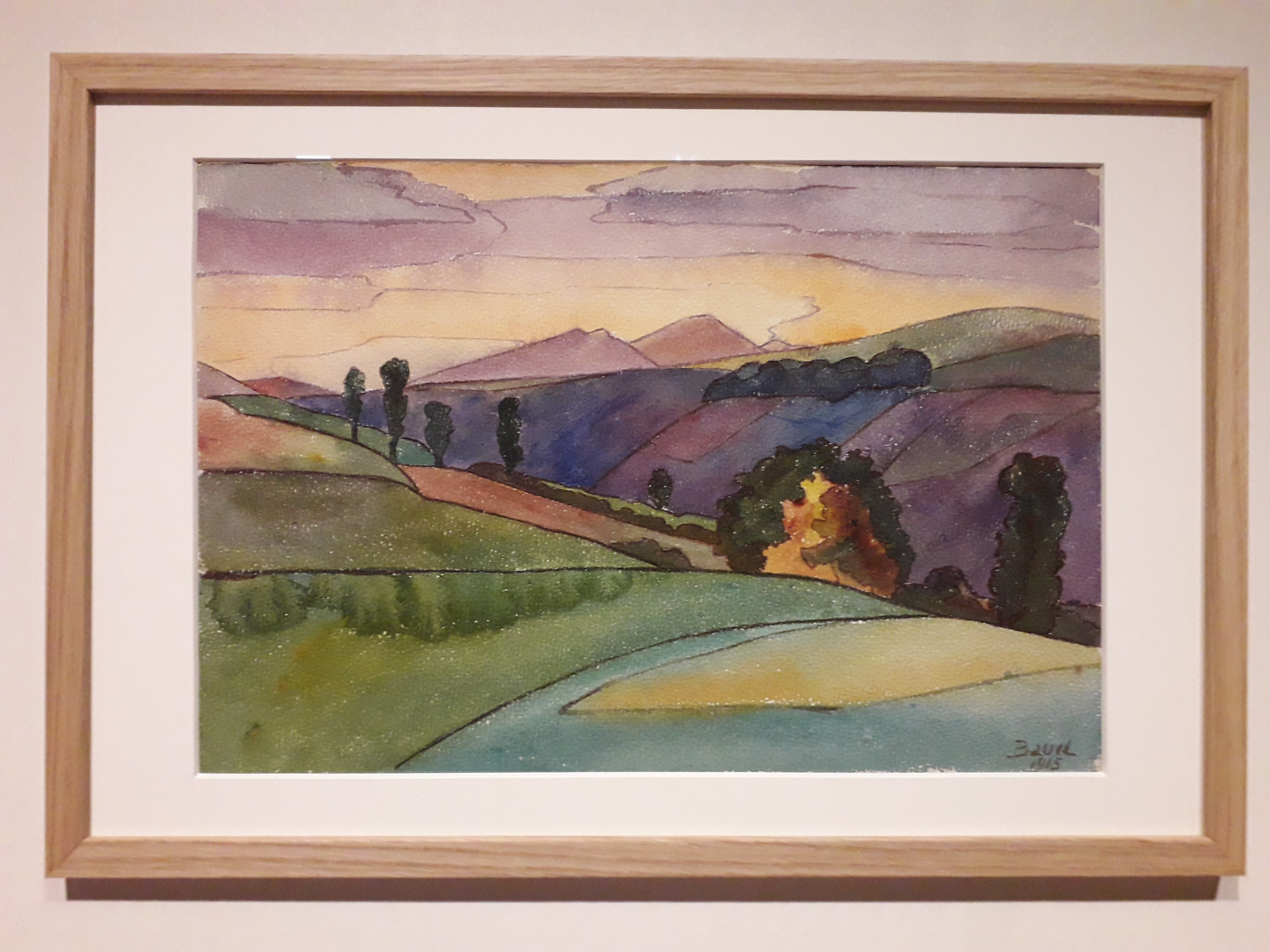
Baud, Marcelle. The Auvergne Countryside 1. Watercolour. Traits d'Egypte: Marcelle Baud (1890-1987), Musée Bargoin.

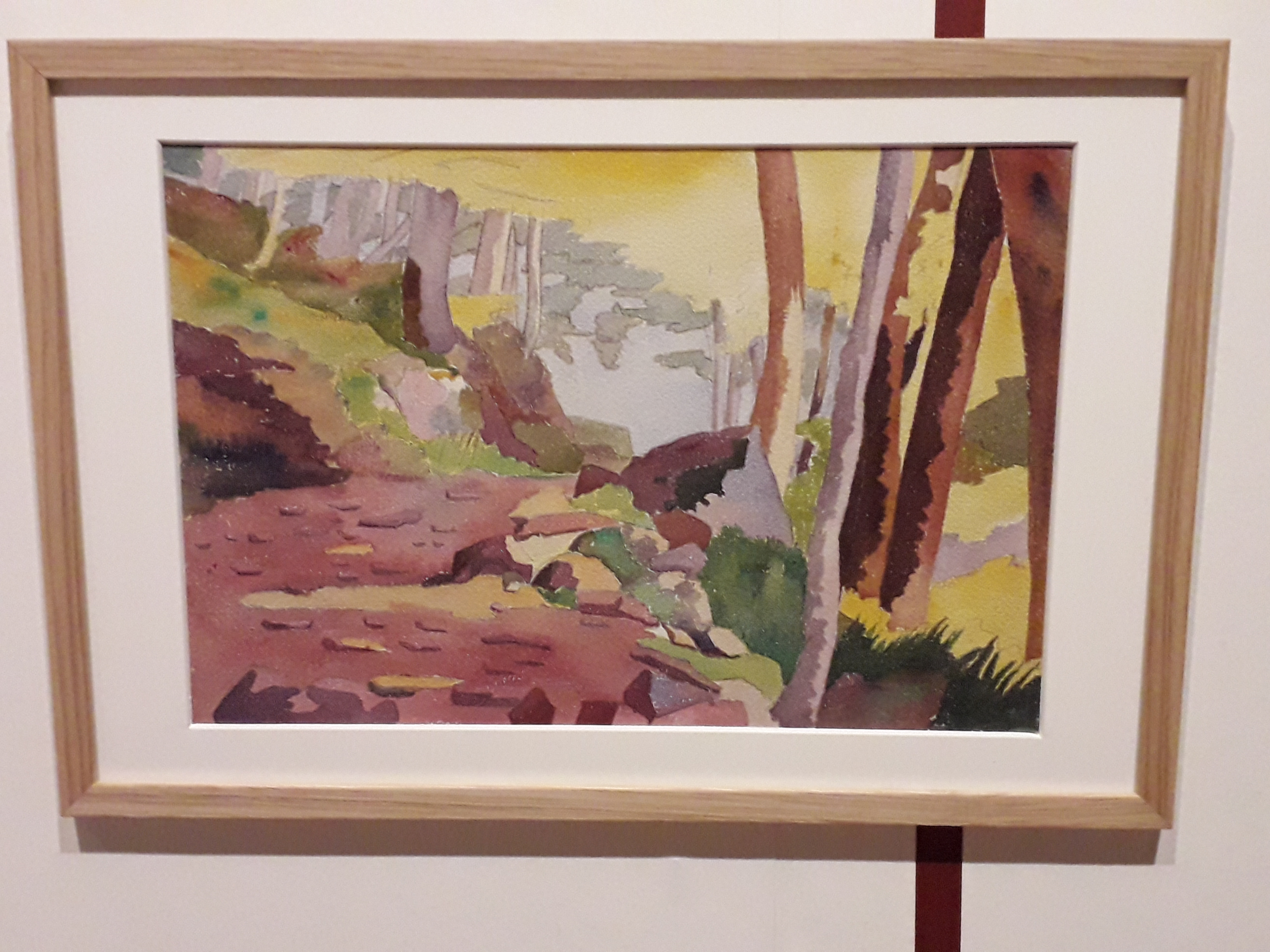
Baud, Marcelle. The Auvergne Countryside 3. Watercolour. Traits d'Egypte: Marcelle Baud (1890-1987), Musée Bargoin.

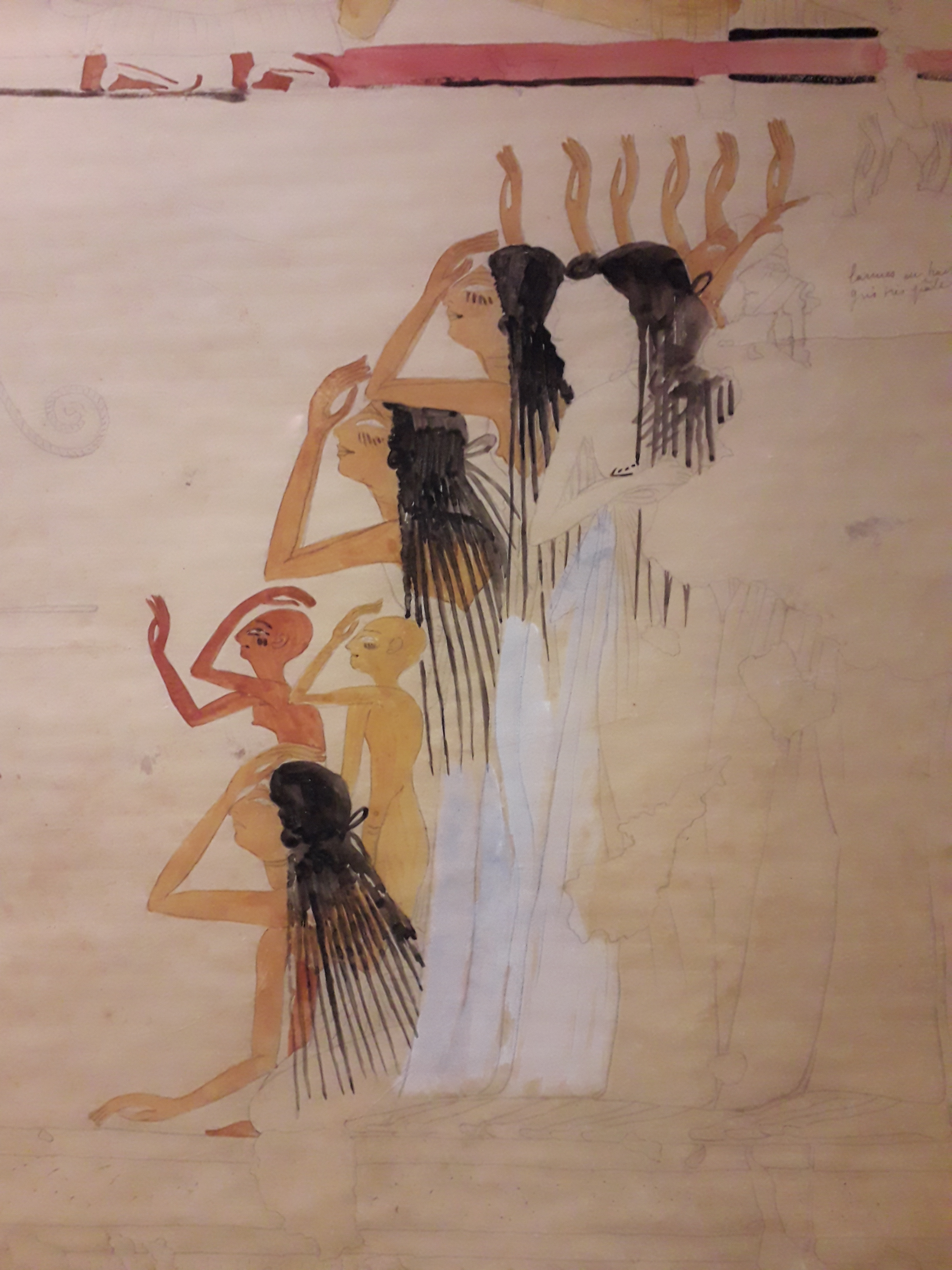
Baud, Marcelle. Detail of Mourners from the Tomb of Amenmose. Traits d'Egypte: Marcelle Baud (1890-1987), Musée Bargoin.

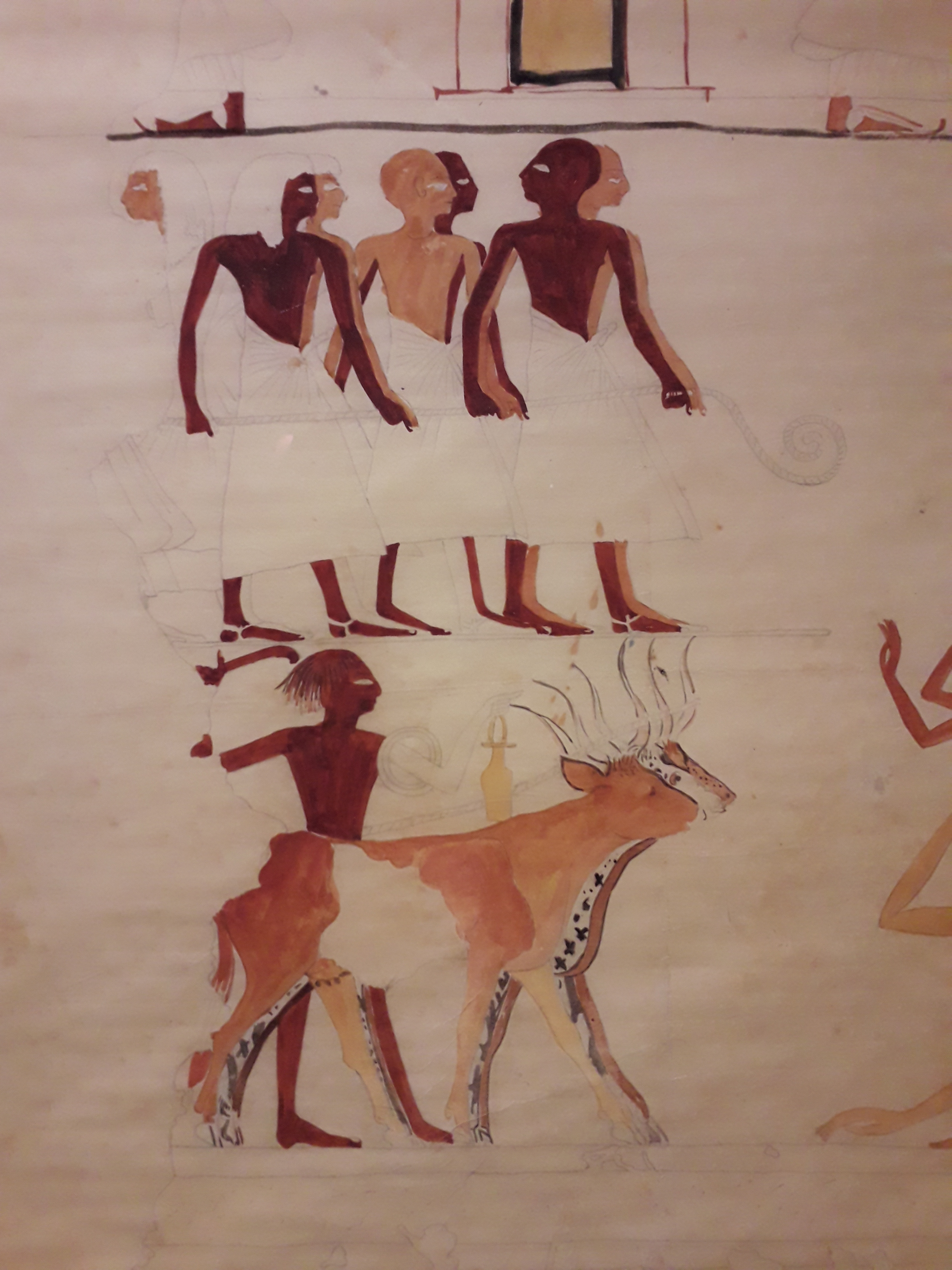
Baud, Marcelle. Detail of Shepherds and Livestock from the Tomb of Amenmose. Traits d'Egypte: Marcelle Baud (1890-1987), Musée Bargoin.

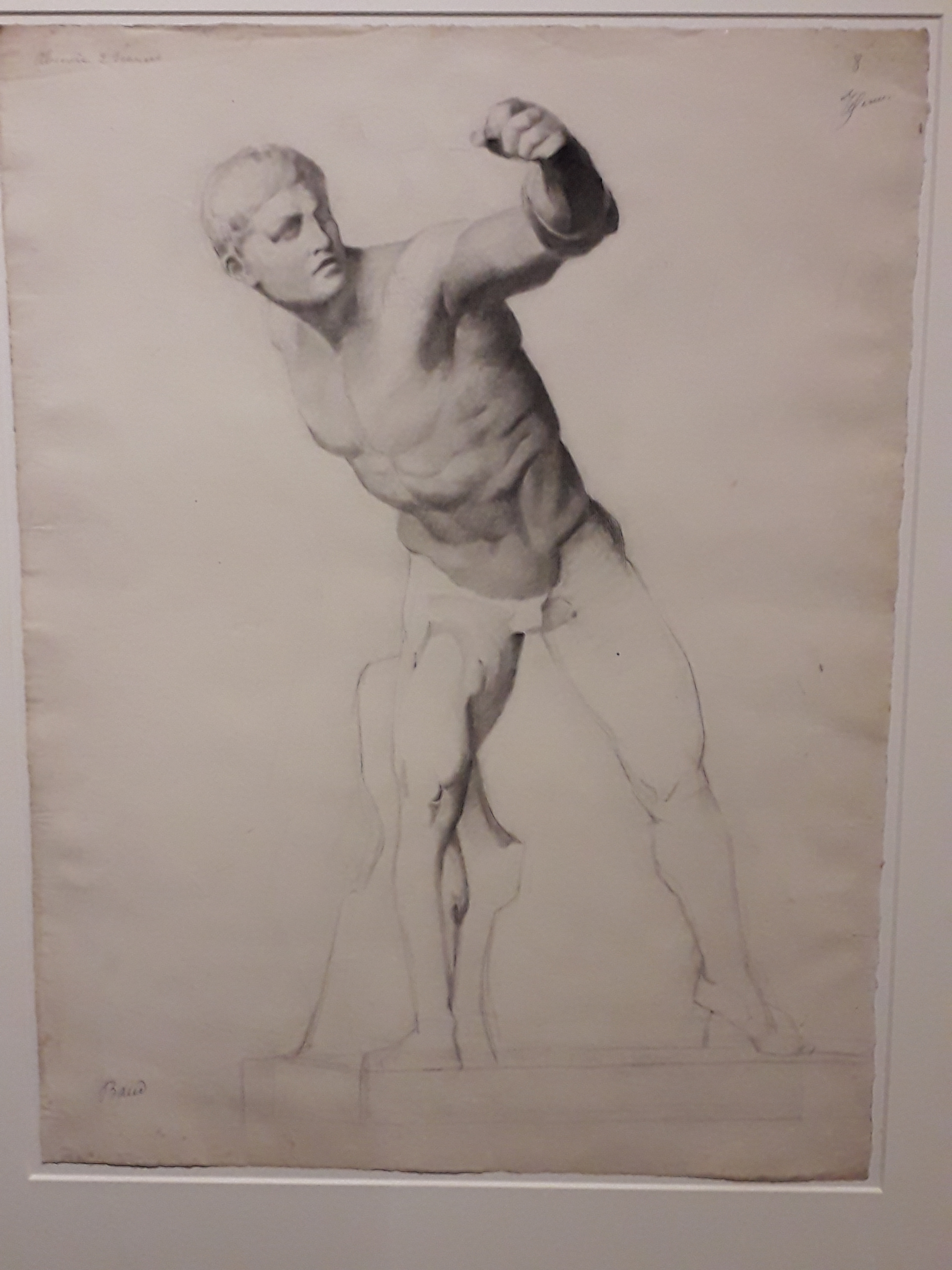
Baud, Marcelle. Sketch of the statue of the Borghese Gladiator, Traits d'Egypte: Marcelle Baud (1890-1987), Musée Bargoin.
