= Golod =

Golod, also transliterated Holod from Ukrainian: Голод, is an East Slavic surname meaning hunger. Notable people with the surname include:

- Alexander Golod, Ukrainian pyramidologist
- Evgeny Golod (1935–2018), Russian mathematician
  - Golod–Shafarevich theorem
- Vitali Golod (born 1971), Israeli chess player

== See also ==
- Holod (disambiguation)
