= John Taylor (English publisher) =

English publisher, essayist, and writer (1781–1864)

- Born: 31 July 1781; East Retford, Nottinghamshire, England
- Died: 5 July 1864 (aged 82); Kensington, England
- Occupations: Publisher, essayist, writer, Egyptologist
- Known for: Publisher of John Keats and John Clare

John Taylor (31 July 1781 – 5 July 1864) was an English publisher, essayist, and writer. He is noted as the publisher of the poets John Keats and John Clare.

== Life ==
He was born in East Retford, Nottinghamshire, the son of James Taylor and Sarah Drury; his father was a printer and bookseller. He attended school first at Lincoln Grammar School and then he went to the local grammar school in Retford. He was originally apprenticed to his father, but eventually he moved to London and worked for James Lackington in 1803. Taylor left after a short while because of low pay, and in 1804 joined the publishing house Vernor & Hood, where he learned the business of publishing literary and practical books.

== Taylor and Hessey ==
In 1806 Taylor formed a partnership with James Augustus Hessey (1785–1870), as Taylor & Hessey, at 93 Fleet Street, London. In 1819, through his cousin Edward Drury, a bookseller in Stamford, he was introduced to John Clare of Helpston in Northamptonshire. He polished Clare's grammar and spelling for publication. He was also Keats's publisher, and published works by Lamb, Coleridge and Hazlitt. The partnership with Hessey came to an end in 1825.

In 1821 John Taylor became involved in publishing the London Magazine.

== Taylor and Walton ==
After the breakup of Taylor & Hessey, Taylor became Bookseller and Publisher to University College London (then called University of London), which opened in Gower Street in 1828. Taylor moved to Upper Gower Street. where he occupied two houses, nos. 28 and 30. In 1836 he was in formal partnership with James Walton. Taylor and Walton published primarily works in fields of interest to the professors of University College: surgical anatomy and obstetrics (including works illustrated with colour lithographs); Liebig's discoveries in biological and agricultural chemistry; applied mathematics and mechanics; grammars of foreign languages; and antiquities of Greece, Rome, and China. Over time they developed a line in what was then the new and developing field of standard academic text books, including books for schools.

After a long bachelor's life fraught with illness and depression, Taylor died at 7 Leonard Place, Kensington, on 5 July 1864 and was buried in the churchyard at Gamston, near Retford, where his tombstone was paid for by the University of London.

== Legacy ==
After Taylor's death, many of his manuscripts were put up for sale at Sotheby's, but the poets of the Regency era were out of fashion, and the total only fetched about £250. In contrast, when sold in 1897, the manuscripts of Endymion and Lamia fetched £695 and £305 respectively.

== Publications ==
Taylor wrote and published his own work, Junius Identified, naming the writer of Letters of Junius, probably correctly, as Sir Philip Francis. It ran to two editions, the second in 1818.

- Taylor, John. The Great Pyramid: Why Was It Built, & Who Built It? Longman, Green, Longman, and Roberts, 1859 (London).
- Taylor, John. The Battle of the Standards. The Ancient, of Four Thousand Years, Against the Modern, of the Last Fifty Years--the Less Perfect of the Two. Longman, Green, Longman, Roberts & Green, 1864 (London).

In The Great Pyramid (1859), Taylor argued that the numbers pi and the golden ratio may have been deliberately incorporated into the design of the Great Pyramid of Khufu at Giza. His theories in pyramidology were then expanded by Charles Piazzi Smyth. His 1864 book The Battle of the Standards was a campaign against the adoption of the metric system in Britain, and relied on results from his earlier book to show a divine origin for the British units of measure.

According to Bernard Lightman, these two publications are strongly linked. He says: "Taylor and his disciples urged that the dimensions of the Pyramid showed the divine origin of the British units of length."

== Family ==
His brother, James Taylor (1788–1863), banker of Bakewell in Derbyshire, published a number of articles on bimetallism.

== See also ==
- Pyramid inch
