= Claude Nowell =

American entrepreneur and religious leader

- Born: November 2, 1944; Salt Lake City, Utah, U.S.
- Died: January 29, 2008 (aged 64); Salt Lake City, Utah, U.S.
- Other names: Corky King; Corky Ra; Summum Bonum Amon Ra
- Education: Orange Coast College (AS); University of Utah
- Known for: Founder of Summum
- Children: 2

Claude Rex Nowell (November 2, 1944 – January 29, 2008), also known as Corky King, Corky Ra, and Summum Bonum Amon Ra, was an American businessman and founder of Summum, a new religious movement that practices a modern form of mummification.

== Early life and education ==
Nowell was born in Salt Lake City, Utah. When he was four years old, his parents divorced and he and his mother moved to Southern California. That same year (1948), his mother married Robert Williamson King and she had Claude's name legally changed to Claude Rex King. When he was young, Claude was given the nickname "Corky" which was how he was known to friends and family.

Up until 1959, Nowell lived in Monrovia, California. Then his family moved to Tustin, California, where he graduated from Tustin High School in 1962. He went on to attend Orange Coast College in Costa Mesa and earned an Associate of Science in Construction Technology. Nowell moved back to Salt Lake City in 1964 and legally changed his name back to Claude Rex Nowell. He attended Brigham Young University and graduated from the University of Utah.

== Career ==
=== Founding of Summum ===
In 1975, Nowell founded Summum following an experience he describes as an encounter with highly intelligent beings, whom he described as "Summa Individuals". The purpose of Summum is to share with others the information he received from his encounter and to provide an environment for those on a path of spiritual development. In 1980, Nowell legally changed his name to Summum Bonum Amon Ra as a representation of his spiritual path.

=== Pyramid and winery ===
In 1978, Nowell began construction of a pyramid that would be used as a winery to produce Summum Soma Nectar. Despite Utah's strict liquor laws and the rigid controls it places on alcoholic beverages, a Utah law allowed him to establish the winery provided the wine was used for religious purposes. The winery was established in 1980 and is one of very few in the state of Utah. The Soma Nectar is also referred to as Nectar Publications and are used in a practice of meditation for the purpose of developing mystical potentials.

=== Modern mummification ===
Through Summum, Nowell re-introduced mummification in a modernized form and at one point was a licensed funeral director in the state of California. Nowell has been referred to as "the father of modern mummification," and the mummification services offered by Summum have received attention in international publications. The process begins with the body's submersion in fluids for 77 days and is complex, requiring about 1,000 hours of labor over six months. Those wishing to be mummified write a "spiritual will" outlining where they hope their soul will go in the next lifetime, to be read to their body at least once a day during its 77 days of submersion.

The first human to undergo the mummification process was Nowell himself, who died in January 2008. His body is encased inside a bronze mummiform (casket) that is covered in gold and stands inside the group's pyramid.

== Personal life ==
Nowell was a member of the Church of Jesus Christ of Latter-day Saints. He had two children. Upon Nowell's death in 2008, he became the first human to be mummified using Summum techniques.
