= Holod =

Holod may refer to:

- Holod (river), a tributary of the Crișul Negru in Bihor County, Romania
- Holod, Bihor, a commune in Bihor County, Romania
- Holod (surname), a Ukrainian surname
- Kholod (Russian: Холод), a Russian supersonic rocket
- Holod Media, an online newspaper founded by Russian journalist Taisiya Bekbulatova
