= James Hessey (publisher) =

English publisher

James Augustus Hessey (28 August 1785 in Clerkenwell – 7 April 1870 in Manningford Bruce) was an English publisher who established the publishing company Taylor and Hessey with John Taylor who he met whilst they both worked for James Lackington.

== Early life ==
James was the son of James Hessey (gent.) who had purchased a commission as quartermaster for the 43rd Foot Regiment in 1773. Having fought for the British in the American War of Independence, he left the Army in 17780 and died in 1786, shortly after his sons birth. James's guardians sent him to Burton Grammar School. However, in 1803 he was taken on by James Lackington as an apprentice in the 'Temple of the Muses' Bookstore where he met John Taylor, the two men developing a firm friendship.
