= Joseph Seiss =

American theologian, hymnwriter

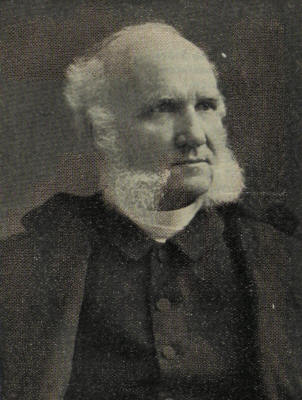
Joseph Seiss

Joseph Augustus Seiss (March 18, 1823 – June 20, 1904) was an American theologian and Lutheran minister. He was known for his religious writings on pyramidology and dispensationalism.

== Life ==
Seiss was born in Graceham, Frederick County, Maryland, to an agricultural family; his interest in religious studies reportedly began in childhood. Seiss was confirmed at age 15 as a member of the Moravian Church, and was determined to pursue the ministry. Beginning in 1839, Seiss enrolled at Gettysburg College in Pennsylvania for a year or two of studies, but completed his theological courses by private study. He was licensed to preach in 1842 by the synod of Virginia, and ordained to a Lutheran ministry in 1844. Seiss held pastorates in Virginia and Maryland until 1858, when he accepted a position at St. John's English Lutheran Church in Philadelphia. In 1875, Seiss was elected pastor of the newly established Lutheran Church of the Holy Communion in western Philadelphia.

His contemporaries described him as "an eloquent pulpit orator" and said his "style is clear, ornate, attractive, and forcible". Periodicals of the day mention his speeches at New York's Steinway Hall and other prominent venues. Seiss was first published when he was 22 years old, and his works were often reviewed in literary and theological journals. A 1904 New York Times abstract describes Seiss as "one of the foremost men of the Church" and "one of the founders of the General Council in 1867".

== Writings and legacy ==
Seiss eventually published more than a hundred works. Perhaps his most well-known work is The Great Pyramid of Egypt, Miracle in Stone: Secrets and Advanced Knowledge (1877); it is considered a primary text of pyramidology. Seiss explicitly hoped that his writings on pyramidology would contribute "something toward the furtherance of correct science, true philosophy, and a proper Christianity". The new forward to the 2007 reprint of the work states:

In addition to pyramidology, Joseph Seiss was a Christian dispensationalist, a 19th century millennialist school of thought. The dispensationalists viewed human history as a series of covenants with God. They were certain that the end of days could be pinpointed using Biblical prophecy. This was the origin of a set of beliefs widely accepted by contemporary evangelical Christians and by Jehovah's Witnesses.

Seiss is typically cited among less than a dozen theologians who influenced Charles Taze Russell, the founding editor of the magazine now known as The Watchtower. Published by Jehovah's Witnesses' Watch Tower Bible and Tract Society, the religious magazine and organization abandoned its teachings on pyramidology by the late 1920s.

== Works ==
- A Miracle in Stone: The Great Pyramid of Egypt (1877)
- Luther and the Reformation: The Life-Springs of Our Liberties (1883)
- The Gospel in the Stars (1882)

== See also ==
- Pyramidology
- Dispensationalism
