= Patrick Flanagan =

American New Age author and inventor

- Born: Gillis Patrick Flanagan; October 11, 1944; Oklahoma City, Oklahoma, U.S.
- Died: December 19, 2019 (age 75)
- Occupations: Author, inventor
- Website: phisciences.com

Patrick Flanagan (October 11, 1944 – December 19, 2019) was an American New Age author and inventor.

Flanagan wrote books focused on Egyptian sacred geometry and Pyramidology.

In 1958, at the age of 14, while living in Bellaire, Texas, Flanagan invented the neurophone, an electronic device that claims to transmit sound through the body's nervous system directly to the brain. It was patented in the United States in 1968 (Patent #3,393,279). The invention earned him a profile in Life magazine, which called him a "unique, mature and inquisitive scientist."

== Pyramid power ==
During the 1970s, Flanagan was a proponent of pyramid power. He wrote several books and promoted it with lectures and seminars. According to Flanagan, pyramids with the exact relative dimensions of Egyptian pyramids act as "an effective resonator of randomly polarized microwave signals which can be converted into electrical energy." One of his first books, Pyramid Power, was featured in the lyrics of The Alan Parsons Project album, Pyramid.

== Inventions and associated claims ==
In 1958, at the age of 13, Flanagan invented a device which he called a Neurophone, which he claimed transmitted sound via the nervous system to the brain.

== Bibliography ==
- Flanagan, Patrick (1975). Pyramid Power. Camarillo, CA: DeVorss & Company. pp. 174 pages. ISBN 0875162096.
- Flanagan, Patrick (1975). Beyond Pyramid Power. Camarillo, CA: DeVorss & Company. pp. 67 pages. ISBN 0875162088.
- Flanagan, Patrick (1981). Pyramid Power II: Scientific Evidence. Tucson, AZ: Innergy Publications. pp. 162 pages. ISBN 0940598000.
- Flanagan, Patrick (1986). Elixir Of the Ages. San Francisco, CA: Vortex Press. pp. 92 pages.
- Begich, Nick with Flanagan, Patrick (Illustrator) (1996). Towards a New Alchemy: The Millennium Science. Anchorage, AK: Earthpulse Press. pp. 180 pages. ISBN 0964881225.
- Flanagan, Patrick (1997). Pyramid Power: The Millennium Science. Anchorage, AK: Earthpulse Press. pp. 173 pages. ISBN 0964881268.
