= Alexander Golod =

Ukrainian defense contractor

Alexander Golod is a Ukrainian former defense contractor and current scientist and alternative healer, focusing on pyramid research. He has theorized that pyramid structures have energy forces that bring several benefits, for both man and the environment. He has constructed seventeen fiberglass pyramids throughout Russia, the tallest at a height of 132 feet.

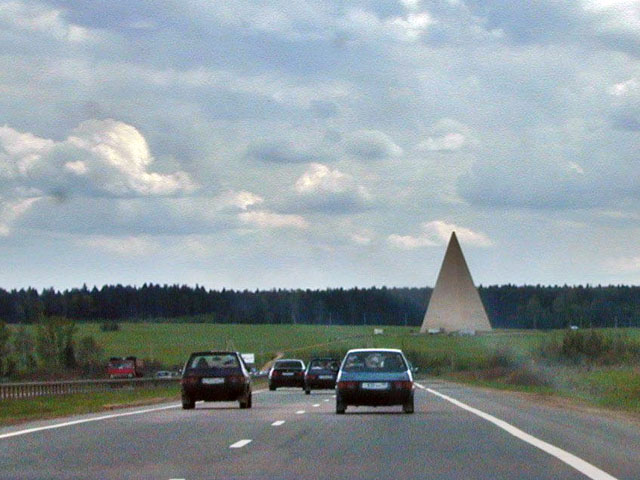
View of Golod's largest pyramid

He believes that the ancient Egyptians had knowledge of this power and that it was the motivation, at least in part, for their building the Great Pyramids of Giza.

== Pyramid research ==
Many paranormal researchers and writers have long speculated about the potential energy properties of pyramid structures. Many theories are prevalent in the research, with writers believing pyramids to have several beneficial properties. Golod's research has been done whilst coordinating a team of scientists. The Russian Academy of Medical Sciences supports his research.

Golod has constructed over twenty pyramids across Russia and former Soviet satellites out of fiberglass and other materials. The largest of these structures is 44 meters high and weighs roughly 55 tons. Golod believes that the pyramid shape channels Earth's magnetic fields and creates positive energy fields that can be harnessed and controlled for man's use. Inside the largest he has placed a number of benches and large globes – geographical, topographical, and astronomical - for tourists to enjoy.

Among the many benefits Golod has claimed is a cause of these pyramids are:

- A boost in immune system strength in fighting pathogens;. He has claimed that persons who enter the pyramid “will not become ill with cancer, AIDS, Alzheimers disease, or other sicknesses.”
- Medicines becoming more effective after exposure to the pyramids;
- Greater crop yield to seeds exposed to the pyramids;
- Presence of an ion column that reportedly repairs Ozone layer;
- Effects of radioactivity are lessened;
- Cure impotence;
- Moderate weather.

Golod also reported held an experiment on prisoners in which they were fed food that had been exposed to the pyramid. The prison reported that acts of violence diminished significantly. Russian astronauts were also reported to have taken objects and water from the pyramid on board the International Space Station to keep themselves healthy. He has also stated “If you put some cheap wine in here, it becomes superior to the finest vintage”. Athletes are reported to visit the pyramid to receive a boost of energy and strength from its powers.

Tourists come from all around the former Soviet states, as well as globally, to see the pyramids, which can be visited free of charge. Golod earns revenues through merchandise reportedly “energized” by the pyramid, including crystals and bottled water. In addition, it is common for weddings and other special events to be held within. A number of tourists have claimed they experienced positive results after visiting the pyramid. Success stories range from barren women being able to conceive after exposure, to the ozone layer above Russia being repaired.

== Criticisms ==
Many Russian doctors and scientists have claimed that the effects are likely psychological when someone enters the pyramid and expects to feel better. Many believe the pyramids are simply a tourist gimmick. There is no scientific consensus on the plausibility of Golod's research. Critics also state empirical evidence is lacking to prove that the pyramids are the actual cause of any healing or other benefits. Mainstream scientists, especially in the west, do not accept his theories due to a substantial lack of published scientific evidence, with Golod relying heavily on observational inference.

There are also a number of tourists who do not share the same enthusiasm as others, claiming that they experienced no changes whatsoever from exposure to the pyramid. Those with ailments did not recover or feel any better. In one case, after hearing of the greater crop yield, one farmer brought his seeds to the pyramid, only to yield a worse crop than the previous season.

== Personal life ==
Golod and his family live near one of the pyramids he has constructed. He is married with children and grandsons.
