= Summerhill Pyramid Winery =

Coordinates: 49°48′22.61″N 119°30′5.51″W

- Location: 4870 Chute Lake Road; Kelowna, British Columbia; V1W 4M3
- Appellation: Okanagan Valley
- Founded: 1986
- Key people: Stephen Cipes, owner Sharmian Duke, winemaker
- Known for: Summerhill Pyramid Winery Cipes Brut
- Varietals: Ehrenfelser, Riesling, Merlot, Zweigelt, Gewurztraminer, Baco Noir, Syrah, Pinot Noir, Viognier, Icewines
- Other attractions: Bistro
- Tasting: open to public
- Website: www.summerhill.bc.ca

Summerhill Pyramid Winery is a winery company based in Kelowna, British Columbia, Canada. Established in 1986 by the Cipes family, it is the most visited winery in British Columbia. It was the first winery to be certified an Organic Winery by the Pacific Agricultural Certification Society of Vernon The winery features a bistro which serves organic selections for lunch and dinner. The winery has also been certified as bio-dynamic by Demeter

== Awards ==
- Gold Medal - Summerhill Pyramid Winery NV Cipes Brut - 32nd All-Canadian Wine Championships (Windsor, Ontario) May 13 to 15, 2012
- Gold Medal – Cipes Rose N/V 2011 Pinot Noir Summit, San Francisco
- Best International Bottle Fermented Sparkling Wine – Cipes Gabriel - IWSC, London, England, December 2009
- Gold Medal – Cipes Brut N/V - 2011 WWC, Chicago, Ill
- Gold Medal – 2007 Riesling Icewine - 2011 San Francisco International Wine Festival
