= Marcelle Werbrouck =

Belgian egyptologist (1889–1959)

- left to right: Arpag Mekhitarian, Jean Stiénon, Violette Verhoogen, Éléonore De Mot, and Marcelle Werbrouck
- Born: 23 May 1889
- Died: 1 August 1959 (aged 70)
- Education: Sorbonne; College of France; Ecole du Louvre
- Occupation: Egyptologist
- Known for: Soroptimist International

Marcelle Werbrouck (23 May 1889 – 1 August 1959) was the first woman Belgian Egyptologist. Her subjects of research were often related the study of prominent goddesses and women of ancient Egypt.

Her first important work was dedicated to the kites, professional mourners (always women) who were paid to lament loudly throughout the burial proceedings. She became later interested in Pharaonic architecture during her study of the temple of Queen Hatshepsut in Deir el-Bahri. Werbouck took part in many missions to the archaeological site of El-Kab in 1936-1937 and 1937–1938, during which she contributed largely to the study of Egyptian divinities and more particularly the goddess Nekhbet.

== Career ==
Daughter of the Belgian general Werbrouck, Marcelle Werbrouck was born in Antwerp on 23 May 1889. She followed courses at the Sorbonne, at the College of France, at the Ecole du Louvre, with teachers like Georges Aaron Bénédite and Gaston Maspero, and the Ecole des Hautes Etudes. During her studies, she became interested in ancient civilizations. She specialized in ancient Egypt after meeting with Belgian Egyptologist Jean Capart.

After graduating from the École du Louvre, she earned her PhD at the Institut Royal d'Histoire de l'Art et d’Archéologie de Bruxelles where she taught for several years. Marcelle Werbrouck was decorated with the médaille de reconnaissance de la Croix-Rouge française after World War I.

Werbrouck worked closely with Capart and contributed directly to the development of Egyptology in Belgium. She took part in Capart's works on Thebes, Memphis and the toumb of Tutankhamun.

She became the first president of the second Belgian club of Soroptimist International, a worldwide volunteer service organization for business and professional women in December 1938.

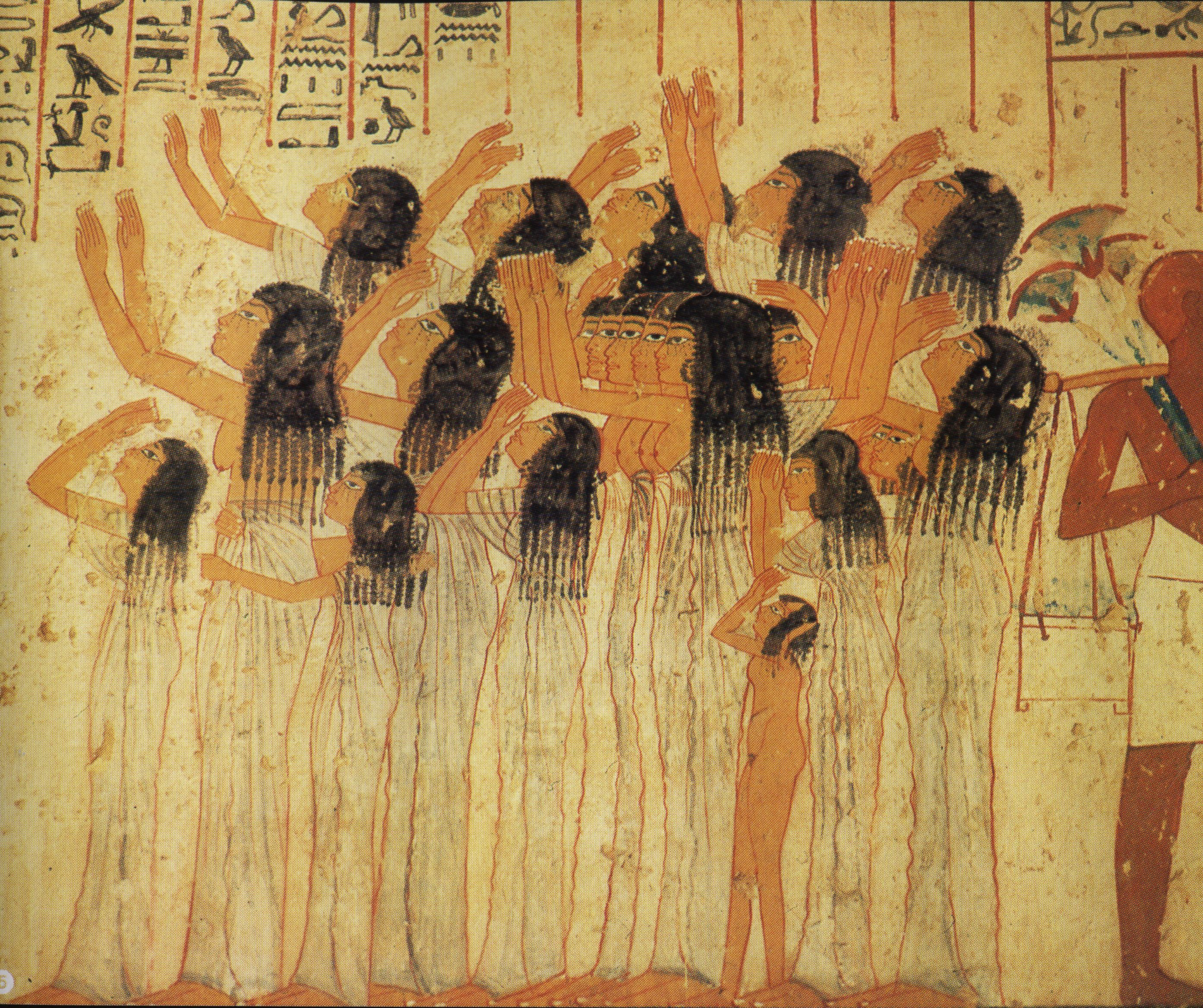
Professional mourners in an eloquent gesture of mourning.

At the death of Capart in 1947, she succeeded him as head of the Egyptian Antiquities section of the Royal Museums of Art and History from 1925 to 1954 and as head of the Queen Elizabeth Egyptological Foundation, which she helped to establish. She was appointed secretary at its creation and became deputy director in 1933 before replacing Capart in 1947.

After World War II, she had to gradually reduce her teachings because of growing fatigue. She died unexpectedly in Issoire, Auvergne, France on 1 August 1959.

== Publications ==
- "Le costume féminin au temps des Pharaons", in La Femme Belge, 1923, 1 (édition A), p. 21-36.
- "À la tombe de Tout-Ankh-Amon", in Vaillante Jeunesse, 1924, 336, p. 112-114.
- "Promenade à Thèbes et visite à Toutankhamon", in Bulletins des Facultés Catholiques de l'Ouest, 1924, 32 (1), p. 55-57.
- "Rapports de Marcelle Werbrouck, chargée de Mission de la Fondation Rein Élisabeth en Égypte 1923-1924", in Chronique d'Égypte, 1925, 1, p. 26-47.
- CAPART, Jean, Thèbes, la gloire d'un grand passé, Bruxelles : Vromant & Co, 1925.
- "La Maison égyptienne", in La Femme belge, 1926, 10, p. 739-745.
- "L'Égypte moderne", in Vaillant Jeunesse, 1926, 361, p. 172-176.
- "Le Mobilier", in La Femme belge, 1926, 2–3, p. 75-84.
- en collaboration avec CAPART, Jean, Thebes, the Glory of a Great Past, New York : Lincoln Mac Veagh, The Dial Press, 1926.
- Thèbes, la gloire d'un grand passé expliquée aux enfants, Bruxelles : Vromant & Co, 1926.
- Thebes, the Glory of a Great Past. Little Book for Everybody, Londres : G. Allen & Unwin Ltd, 1926.
- Impression de voyage. Les élèves", in Chronique d'Égypte, 1927, 4, p. 132-136.
- "Les pleureuses du tombeau de Mera", in Chronique d'Égypte, 1927, 5, p. 48-51.
- Thebe, De Roem van een groot Verleden aan de kinderen uitgelegd, Bruxelles : Vromant & Co, 1927.
- "Trésors antiques", in Vaillante Jeunesse, 1928, 380, p. 73-76.
- "Clair de lune, ciel étoilé", in Chronique d'Égypte, 1929, 8, p. 206-208.
- "La tombe de Nakht", in Bulletin des Musées royaux d'art et d'histoire", 1929, 3, p. 58-61.
- "Trois types de l'Égypte d'autrefois", in Bulletin des Musées royaux d'art et d'histoire, 1929, 5, p. 90-94.
- "Un buste royal égyptien aux Musées du Cinquantenaire", in La Revue d'Art, 1929, 2, p. 73-75.
- "La tombe de Nakht", in collaboration with van de WALLE, Baudouin, Bruxelles : Édition de la Fondation égyptologique Reine Élisabeth, 1929.
- Léopold II et l'Égyptologie", in La Gaule, 1930, 3, p. 76-79.
- "Un peu d'égyptologie", in L'Indépendance, 1930, p. 30-33.
- "Un vase en verre d'El Amarna", in Bulletin des Musées Royaux d'Art et d'Histoire, 1930, 2, p. 38-40.
- Memphis à l'ombre des pyramides, in collaboration with Jean Capart, Bruxelles : Vromant & Co, 1930.
- "Horus "à la huppe", in Bulletin des Musées Royaux d'Art et d'Histoire, 1931, 5, p. 150-151.
- "Le Syrien vaincu", in Bulletin des Musées Royaux d'Art et d'Histoire, 1931, 6, p. 154-156.
- "Un fragment de sculpture d'un type rare", in Actes du XVIIIe Congrès international des orientalistes, Leyde, 1931, p. 80.
- "La tombe de Nakht", in La Sève, 1932, 1, p. 25-28.
- "Ostraca à figures", in Bulletin des Musées Royaux d'Art et d'Histoire, 1932, 5, p. 106-109.
- "Rapport de Mlle Marcelle Werbrouck, chargée de mission de la Fondation Reine Elisabeth", in Chronique d'Égypte, 13–14, 1932, p. 14-20.
- "À propos du dieu Bes", in Egyptian Religion, 1933, I (1), p. 28-32.
- "Remaniements et dépôts récents dans la 1re section (Antiquité)", in Bulletin des Musées Royaux d'Art et d'Histoire, 1933, 6, p. 140-141.
- "Un vase en forme de dieu Bès", in Bulletin des Musées Royaux d'Art et d'Histoire, 1933, 2, p. 38-39.
- "Aux fouilles de l'Egypt Exploration Society" à Tell el Armanah", in Chronique d'Égypte, 1934, 18, p. 228-230.
- "Deux fragments de la tombe de Ramose", in Bulletin des Musées Royaux d'Art et d'Histoire, 1934, 2, p. 44-46.
- "L'oiseau dans les tombes thébaines", in Mémoires publiés par les membres de l'Institut français d'archéologie orientale du Caire, 1934, LXVI, p. 21-25.
- "Ostraca à figures", in Bulletin des Musées Royaux d'Art et d'Histoire, 1934, 6, p. 138-140.
- "Une merveille", in L'Art et la Vie, 1934, 6, p. 330-341.
- "La collection Léopold II", in Bulletin des Musées Royaux d'Art et d'Histoire, 1935, 3, p. 63-67.
- "Sprzety staro zytnego Egiptu", in Arkady, 1936, II (11), p. 618-623.
- "La décoration murale du temple des Mentouhotep", in Bulletin des Musées Royaux d'Art et d'Histoire, 1937, 2, p. 36-44.
- "Les récentes découvertes de l'Égyptologie", in Chronique d'Égypte, 1937, 24, p. 128.
- "Des signes "ankh", "dad", et "ouas" réunis, superposés ou combinés", in Actes du XXe Congrès des Orientalistes, Bruxelles, 1938, p. 79-82.
- "Deux bas-reliefs d'Ancien Empire", in Bulletin des Musées Royaux d'Art et d'Histoire, 1938, 6, p. 137-141.
- Les pleureuses de l'Égypte ancienne, Bruxelles : Fondation Égyptologique Reine Élisabeth, 1938.
- "Nécrologie. Mrs Griffith", in Chronique d'Égypte, 1938, 25, p. 133.
- "Ostraca à figures", in Bulletin des Musées Royaux d'Art et d'Histoire, 1939, 2, p. 41-45.
- "Les multiples formes du dieu Bès", in Bulletin des Musées Royaux d'Art et d'Histoire, 1939, 4, p. 77-82.
- "Iconographie de Nekhabit", in Fouilles de El-Kab. Documents, Bruxelles : Fondation Égyptologique Reine Élisabeth, 1940, p. 46-60.
- "Princesse égyptienne", in Chronique d'Égypte, 1940, 30, p. 197-204.
- "À propos du disque ailé", in Chronique d'Égypte, 1941, 32, p. 165-171.
- "Archéologie de Nubie", in Bulletin des Musées Royaux d'Art et d'Histoire, 1941, 1, p. 15-21.
- "Un collier royal de la XVIIIe dynastie pharaonique", in Bulletin des Musées Royaux d'Art et d'Histoire, 1941, 6, p. 133-136.
- "Archéologie de Nubie. Napata", in Bulletin des Musées Royaux d'Art et d'Histoire, 1942, 2, p. 26-36.
- "Essai de reconstitution de la stèle Oup", in Bulletin des Musées Royaux d'Art et d'Histoire, 1943, 1–2, p. 27-34.
- "Archéologie de Nubie", in Bulletin des Musées Royaux d'Art et d'Histoire, 1945, 1–6, p. 2-9.
- "La Ménagère des Pharaons", in La Femme, la Vie, le Monde, 1946, I (5), p. 8-10.
- "Jean Capart (1877-1947)", in Archives, Bibliothèques et Musées de Belgique, 1947, XVIII (2), p. 147-150.
- "Jean Capart et la Fondation Égyptologique Reine Élisabeth", in Chronique d'Égypte, 1947, 44, p. 192-196.
- "Une stèle égyptienne du temps d'Akhenaton", in Bulletin des Musées Royaux d'Art et d'Histoire, 1947, 4–6, p. 80-82.
- Catalogue de la collection égyptologique Walters", Revue belge de Philologie et d'Histoire, 1948, XXVI, 4, p. 1291-1295.
- "Le souvenir et la relève des Maîtres : Jean Capart", in Sept Arts, 1948, 2.
- "Fondation Égyptologique Reine Élisabeth. Rapport de la directrice", in Chronique d'Égypte, 1948, 45–46, p. 7-12.
- "Une tête royale égyptienne : Hatshepsout", in Actes du XXIe Congrès international des orientalistes, Paris, 1948, p. 81.
- "Animaux sacrifiés", in Bulletin des Musées Royaux d'Art et d'Histoire, 1949, 1–6, p. 58-59.
- "À propos de "Lusus naturae", in Chronique d'Égypte, 1949, 47, p. 95.
- Le temple d'Hatshepsout à Deir el Bahari, Bruxelles : Fondation Égyptologique Reine Élisabeth, 1949.
- "Fondation Égyptologique Reine Élisabeth. Rapport de la directrice", in Chronique d'Égypte, 1949, 47, p. 5-9.
- "Stèle au quatre Montou", in Chronique d'Égypte, 1949, 48, p. 285-287.
- "Une statuette d'Égyptien", in Bulletin des Musées Royaux d'Art et d'Histoire, 1949, 1–6, p. 55-57.
- "Le temple de Qasr es-Sagha", in Chronique d'Égypte, 1950, 50, p. 199-208.
- "Fondation Égyptologique Reine Élisabeth. Rapport de la directrice", in Chronique d'Égypte, 1950, 49, p. 6-14.
- "Fondation Égyptologique Reine Élisabeth. Rapport de la directrice", in Chronique d'Égypte, 1951, 51, p. 7-14.
- "Statuette d'un génie de Pé", in Bulletin des Musées Royaux d'Art et d'Histoire, 1951, 1–6, p. 23-24.
- "La déesse Nekhbet et la reine d'Égypte", Archiv Orientální, 1952, XX, p. 197-203.
- "Le Cirque de Deir el Bahari", in Reflets du Monde, 1952, 1, p. 1-16.
- "L'esprit de Pé", in Chronique d'Égypte, 1952, p. 43-50.
- "Nécrologie. Marie Weynants-Ronday", in Chronique d'Égypte, 1952, 53, p. 145-147.
- "Fondation Égyptologique Reine Élisabeth. Rapport de la directrice", in Chronique d'Égypte, 1950, 49, p. 6-14.
- "Salle de Nubie", in Bulletin des Musées Royaux d'Art et d'Histoire, 1952, p. 5-11.
- "Ostraca à figures", in Bulletin des Musées Royaux d'Art et d'Histoire, 1953, 25e année, p. 93-111.
- "Fondation Égyptologique Reine Élisabeth. Rapport de la directrice", in Chronique d'Égypte, 1953, XXVIII 55, p. 5-9.
- "Quelques monuments d'Aménophis Ier à El-Kab", in Fouilles de El-Kab. Documents, Bruxelles : Fondation égyptologique Reine Élisabeth, 1954, p. 99-102.
- "Quelques ostraca inédits du Musée de Bruxelles", in Proceedings of the twenty-third International Congress of Orientalists, Cambridge, 1954, p. 67.
- "Fondation Égyptologique Reine Élisabeth. Rapport de la directrice", in Chronique d'Égypte, 1954, XXIX, 57, p. 5-9.
- "Fondation Égyptologique Reine Élisabeth. Rapport de la directrice", in Chronique d'Égypte, 1955, 59, p. 6-10.
- "Témoignage de l'intérêt que la Reine Élisabeth porte aux sciences : la Fondation Égyptologique Reine Élisabeth", in Une Grande Dame de notre temps : la reine Élisabeth, 1955, p. 13.
- "The symbolism of egyptian Ceiling Paintings, in Egypt Travel Magazine, 1955, 10, p. 44-45.
- "Fondation Égyptologique Reine Élisabeth. Rapport de la directrice", in Chronique d'Égypte, 1956, XXXI, 61, p. 8-11.
- "Fondation Égyptologique Reine Élisabeth. Rapport de la directrice", in Chronique d'Égypte, 1957, XXXII, 63, p. 9-12.
- "Cônes funéraires de Kaemimen", in Chronique d'Égypte, 1958, XXXIII, 66, p. 223-226.
- "Fondation Égyptologique Reine Élisabeth. Rapport de la directrice", in Chronique d'Égypte, 1958, XXXIII, 65, p. 8-14.
- "Un Syrien contemporain de Toutkhamon", in Bulletin des Musées Royaux d'Art et d'Histoire, 1958, 30ème année, p. 102-104.
- "Fondation Égyptologique Reine Élisabeth. Rapport de la directrice", in Chronique d'Égypte, 1959, XXXIV, 67, p. 7-13.
- "Un groupe de deuillants à la XVIIIe dynastie", in Chronique d'Égypte, 1959, 68, p. 203-207.

== Bibliography ==
- BRUFFAERTS Jean-Michel, "Marcelle Werbrouck ou l’égyptologie belge au féminin", in: Doyen Florence, Preys René et Quertinmont Arnaud (dirs.), "Sur le chemin du ‘Mouseion’ d’Alexandrie. Études offertes à Marie-Cécile Bruwier", Montpellier, Université Paul Valéry Montpellier 3, CENiM, 2018, p. 43-71 (Cahiers de l’ENiM).
- GILBERT Pierre, "Marcelle Werbrouck. Anvers 23 mai 1889 -Issoire 1er août 1959", in: : Chronique d'Égypte, 1959, 34, 187–202.
- GILBERT Pierre, "Rapport du directeur", in: Chronique d'Égypte, 1960, 35, 5–9.
