= Summum =

Religion and philosophy

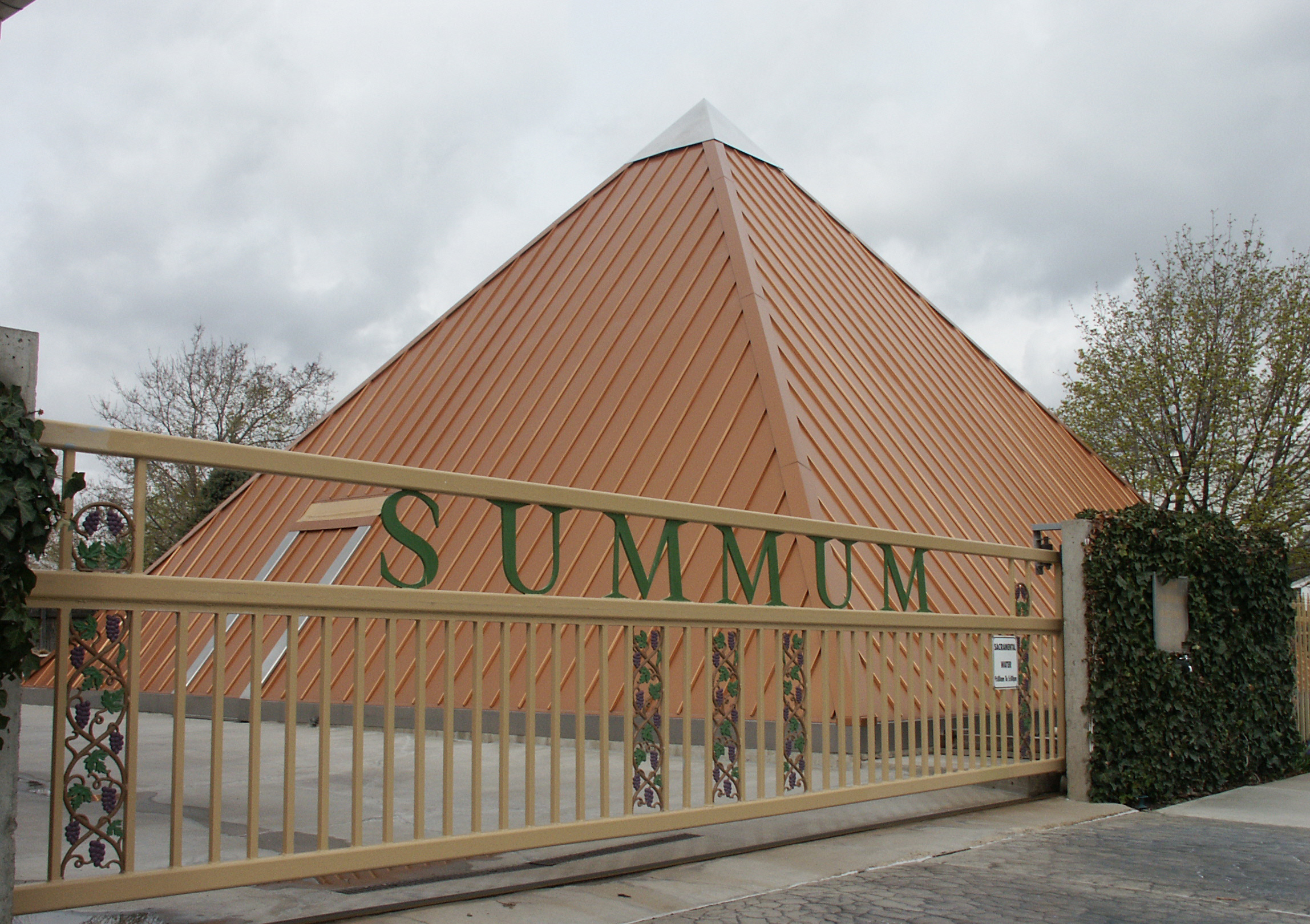
The Summum Pyramid

Summum is a new religious movement that began in 1975 as a result of American citizen Claude "Corky" Nowell's claimed encounter with beings he described as "Summa Individuals". According to Nowell, these beings presented him with concepts regarding the nature of creation, concepts that have always existed and are continually re-introduced to humankind by advanced beings who work along the pathways of creation. As a result of his experience, Nowell founded Summum in order to share the "gift" he received with others. In 1980, as a reflection of his newfound path, he changed his name to Summum Bonum Amon Ra, but news stories indicate he goes by Corky Ra. Summum religious practices draw upon both Ancient Egyptian religion and the Hebrew prophet Moses.

== Basis of the philosophy ==
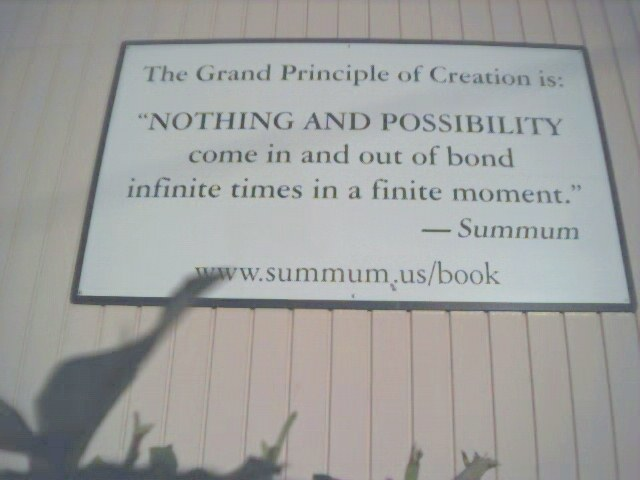
Summum sign: "The grand principle of creation is: 'Nothing and possibility come in and out of bond infinite times in a finite moment.'"

Summum's philosophy stems from what it considers to be principles of nature that cannot be attributed to any person. These principles flower in different forms and were outlined before in the writings of The Kybalion first published in 1908. But Summum, considering The Kybalion incomplete and antiquated, rewrote the book after it entered the public domain. The new derivative work utilized a more modern language and incorporated the new information said to have been presented to Ra by the Summa Individuals. Included in that information is an explanation and description of how creation came about. The rewrite resulted in a book published by Summum entitled SUMMUM: Sealed Except to the Open Mind, and it provides an outline of the group's philosophy. The basis of the philosophy is the "Grand Principle of Creation" that states, "Nothing and Possibility come in and out of bond infinite times in a finite moment". The principle of creation generates the totality of existence which the Summum philosophy refers to as "SUMMUM", and from this master principle emanate "Seven Summum Principles" known as Psychokinesis, Correspondence, Vibration, Opposition, Rhythm, Cause and Effect, and Gender.

Summum states that its teachings are the same as the teachings of Gnostic Christianity and maintains that knowledge does not come from things such as the intellect or obedience or faith, but from revelatory experience. Summum teaches the "Systematic Law of Learning" which explains that knowledge is attained through questioning and experience. According to Summum, devotion and spiritual practice leads to revelatory experience, and that was the basis of the authentic teachings of Jesus.

== Etymology and philosophical meaning ==
The word "summum" is Latin and is the neuter form of "summus" which means "highest".

In the context of the Summum philosophy, "summum" means "the sum total of all creation". Summum appears to distinguish between "Summum" and "SUMMUM" in that "Summum" is the name of an organization and philosophy while "SUMMUM" is a name given to the totality of existence.

== Meditation ==
Practice of the religion involves meditation upon the aspect of creation that is within one's self. Summum believes that within all created things is an essence which is the spirit of the creator, and that the more one directs his or her attention to this indwelling spirit, the more one realizes its existence and moves along the lines of spiritual progression, developing "spiritual Psychokinesis". It appears that there is no recognized deity per se in the philosophy, but rather that people are all part of the mind of the universe and that the universe collectively constitutes something great and worthy of study and meditation.

According to Summum, our mental states dictate our sense of harmony and disharmony, and the resulting experiences become part of our memories that then hold us captive.

== Nectar Publications ==
Summum produces "Nectar Publications", which are wines used in the meditation practices that Summum teaches. The nectars are made inside the Summum Pyramid, and according to Summum are imbued with resonations that contain spiritual concepts. Summum has made a number of different types of nectars, each containing its own "message". A small amount of nectar is consumed prior to meditation, and the alcohol is said to carry the resonations across the blood–brain barrier where they are released in the brain. Perception of the nectars' effects is said to depend upon the awareness of the person using them.

Governmental authorities consider the nectars to be wine and required that Summum obtain a winery license in order to make them. Summum is Utah's first federally bonded winery.

== Mummification ==
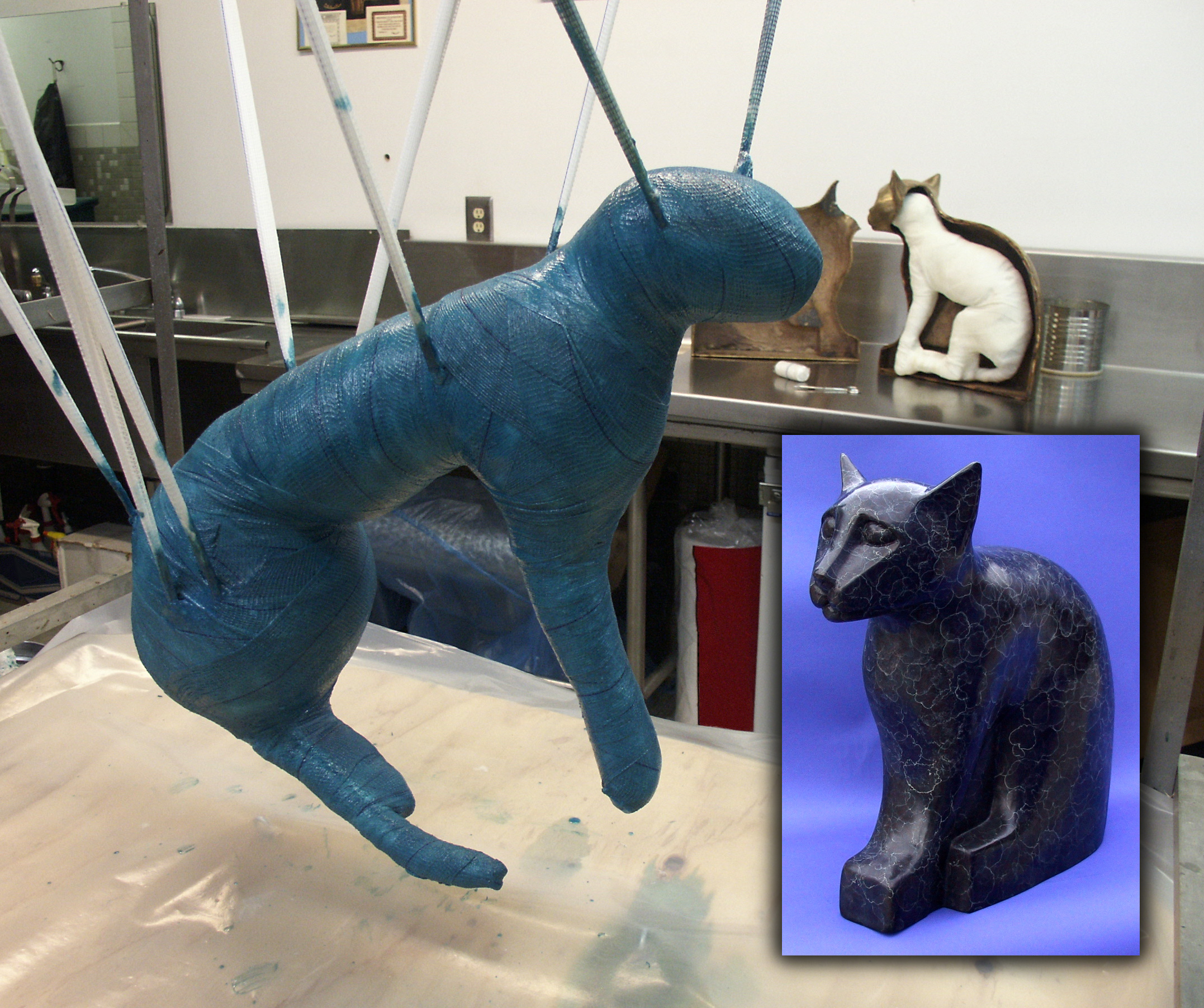
A cat being mummified by Summum

Summum practices "Modern Mummification" and "Transference" as a means to guide one's essence to a greater destination following the death of the body. Summum is a 501(c)(3) non-profit corporation sole that was granted a religious exemption from the IRS for its mummification service. The service is available to anyone for spiritual reasons and is also offered for pets. Summum does request and accept donations. The process has been featured in programs produced by National Geographic and the British Broadcasting Corporation.

The first person to undergo the mummification process was Nowell himself, who died in January 2008. His body is encased inside a bronze mummiform casket that is covered in gold and stands inside the group's pyramid.

== Participants ==
According to its founder, over 250,000 people worldwide have "received" Summum instruction. As the organization does not keep formal membership records, this figure is based on the number of bottles of wine it has distributed.

== Ten Commandments ==
Summum contends that the principles and nature of creation are continuously re-introduced to humankind by evolved beings. The group holds that in one such case, Moses in the Old Testament was given both a "lower" and "higher" knowledge from a divine being. The lower knowledge was embodied in the more widely known Ten Commandments, while the higher was expressed in what Summum refers to as the "Seven Aphorisms". According to Summum, when Moses first descended from Mount Sinai, he had with him the higher law inscribed on stone tablets. However, the undeveloped condition of the Israelites prevented them from understanding. Moses returned to Mount Sinai and returned with another set of tablets containing the lower law that was much easier for the people to comprehend. The higher law was only shared with a few capable of understanding its meaning. This appears to coincide with one of Summum's precepts that states, "The voice of wisdom is silent, except to the OPEN MIND", and in this aspect, Summum resembles an esoteric religious movement.

According to the group, the "Seven Aphorisms" are:

1. SUMMUM is MIND, thought; the universe is a mental creation.
2. As above, so below; as below, so above.
3. Nothing rests; everything moves; everything vibrates.
4. Everything is dual; everything has an opposing point; everything has its pair of opposites; like and unlike are the same; opposites are identical in nature, but different in degree; extremes bond; all truths are but partial truths; all paradoxes may be reconciled.
5. Everything flows out and in; everything has its season; all things rise and fall; the pendulum swing expresses itself in everything; the measure of the swing to the right is the measure of the swing to the left; rhythm compensates.
6. Every cause has its effect; every effect has its cause; everything happens according to Law; Chance is just a name for Law not recognized; there are many fields of causation, but nothing escapes the Law of Destiny.
7. Gender is in everything; everything has its masculine and feminine principles; Gender manifests on all levels.

=== Freedom of speech ===
Summum followers have gained attention as of late in that they have proposed that their Seven Aphorisms be placed in public places alongside the Ten Commandments, specifically in several locations in Utah. Christians and town fathers have objected, claiming that the Ten Commandments are of great historic significance to the United States, and as such are not solely a religious statement, whereas the seven aphorisms are a modern philosophy. Summum has prevailed in other litigation where the Tenth Circuit Court of Appeals ruled that Summum was denied its right to free speech and governments had engaged in discrimination. The governments in those cases elected to remove their Ten Commandments monument rather than allow Summum to erect its Seven Aphorisms monument. However, Pleasant Grove, Utah, was successful in getting the United States Supreme Court to hear their case. Their argument is that the acceptance of a monument is not an instance of a public forum where speakers may not be discriminated against, but rather a form of government speech that does not require neutral viewpoints.

On February 25, 2009, the Supreme Court ruled unanimously against Summum in the Pleasant Grove case. Justice Samuel Alito, in his opinion for the court, asserted that a municipality's acceptance and acquisition of a privately funded permanent monument erected in a public park while refusing to accept other privately funded permanent memorials is a valid expression of governmental speech, which is permissible and not an unconstitutional interference with the First Amendment's guarantee of free speech. According to Alito, "the display of a permanent monument in a public park" is perceived by an ordinary and reasonable observer to be an expression of values and ideas of the government, the owner of the park and the monument, even though the particular idea expressed by the monument is left to the interpretation of the individual observer. Alito made a clear distinction between forms of private speech in public parks, such as rallies and temporary holiday displays (Christmas trees and menorahs), and the government speech represented by permanent monuments. He opined that even long-winded speakers eventually go home with their leaflets and holiday displays are taken down; but permanent monuments endure and are obviously associated with their owners. Alito wrote, "cities and other jurisdictions take some care in accepting donated monuments." While Summum and its supporters attempted to persuade the Court that preventing governments from selecting monuments on the basis of content would be tenable, Justice Alito noted that such a situation would put government in the position of having to choose between accepting permanent monuments with conflicting messages that do not represent the values and ideals of the community, and removing all monuments from public space. As described by Alito, if the law accorded with Summum and its supporters, New York would have been required to accept a Statue of Autocracy from the German Empire or Imperial Russia when it accepted the Statue of Liberty from France.

In a companion case, Summum requested a monument of its Seven Aphorisms be placed next to a Ten Commandments monument in Roy Park, a public park in the city of Duchesne, Utah. Following the Supreme Court's ruling in Pleasant Grove v. Summum, Summum claimed the ruling opened the door for a new challenge based on church-state separation claims. Unlike Pleasant Grove, the Duchesne Ten Commandments monument was the only one in the park. Duchesne decided to move the monument to the city cemetery to avoid continuing litigation, citing counsel from their attorney who said the solitary monument would establish a religion for the city. As a result of the monument's removal from the city park, Summum's lawsuit became moot and was dismissed.

== Summum Pyramid ==
The Summum Pyramid is a sanctuary and temple used by the organization of Summum for instruction in the Summum philosophy. It is located in Salt Lake City, Utah, and was built during 1977 to 1979. The pyramid is 40 feet (12 m) long at the base, 26 feet (7.9 m) high, and is oriented towards true north of the Earth. The structure also incorporates the golden ratio in its design.
