= Jean Capart =

Belgian Egyptologist

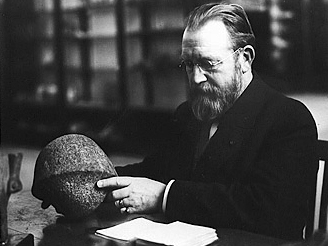
- Born: February 21, 1877; Brussels
- Died: June 16, 1947 (aged 70); Etterbeek
- Occupation: Egyptologist

Jean Capart (February 21, 1877 – June 16, 1947) was a Belgian Egyptologist, who is often considered the "Father of Belgian Egyptology".

== Biography ==
Capart was born to Alphonse Capart, an otolaryngologist, and Alida Carbonelle in Brussels on 21 February 1877. He studied Egyptology under Karl Alfred Wiedemann at Bonn University.

=== Career as museum curator ===
In 1900, he was appointed to be assistant conservator of the Egyptian collection at the Musées royaux du Cinquantenaire, Brussels; prior to that he had been a free collaborator with the museum for two years. He held this position until 1911, when he was appointed Curator. In 1925, he became Chief Curator and Director, and from 1942 until his death, he held the title Honorary Chief Curator.

Early in his tenure at the Musées Royaux du Cinquantenaire, he convinced the Belgian government to purchase a subscription to the Egypt Exploration Fund (EEF), now the Egypt Exploration Society, and he became the local secretary of the EEF for Belgium. He would travel yearly to London to meet with William Flinders Petrie to negotiate what objects would be sent to Belgium from their subscription. From 1926 to 1927, he edited the Bibliography of Ancient Egypt in the Journal of Egyptian Archaeology, the journal hosted by the EEF.

He also bought objects for the Musées Royaux du Cinquantenaire from various collection sales including those of Gayet (1901), Amélineau (1904), Somzée (1904), Philip (1905), Hilton Price (1911), Amherst (1921) and MacGregor (1922).

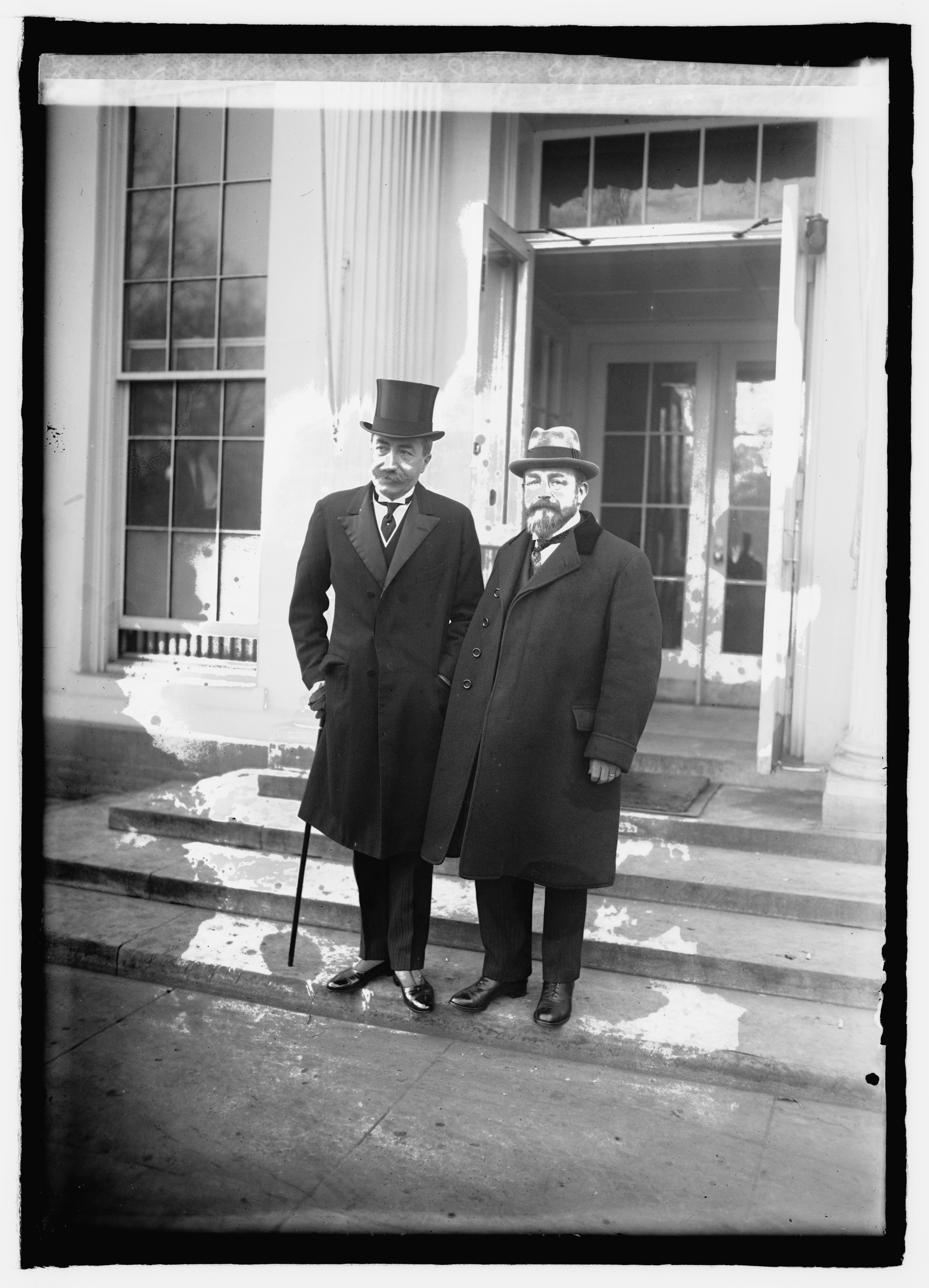
Ambassador to the United States of America Baron de Cartier de Marchienne of Belgium and Jean Capart

Capart also maintained a relationship with American Egyptology. From 1932 to 1938, he was a part-time Honorary Curator of Egyptology at the Brooklyn Museum, and then Honorary Advisory Curator from 1938 until his death.

=== Career as professor of Egyptology ===
In 1902, he was made the first Belgian chair of Egyptology at the University of Liège. In 1910, the Institut Supérieur d'Histoire de l’Art et d'Archéologie was established and Capart was appointed as a professor. In 1929, he became an honorary professor, entrusting his teaching responsibilities to his student, Baudouin van de Walle.

=== Excavations ===
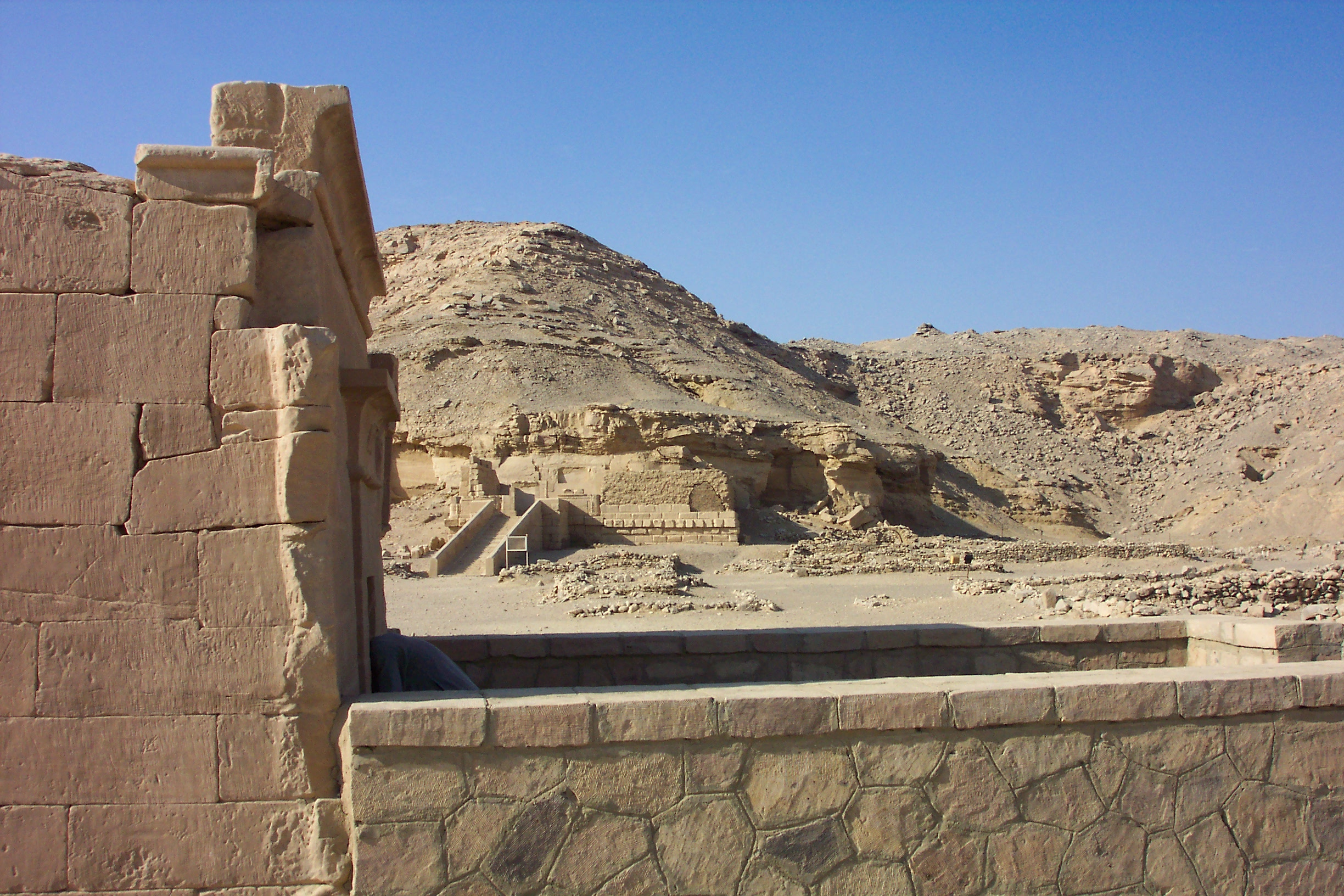
Temple at El-Kab

He was director of the El-Kab excavations from 1927 to 1929 and then 1945.

== Honours and awards ==
- 1939: Honorary doctorate, University of Montreal

=== Honorary positions ===
- 1924: Professeur d'échanges, Université de Lyon
- 1929: Honorary Professor of Egyptology, University of Liege
- 1932: Honorary Curator, Brooklyn Museum
- 1942: Honorary Chief Curator, Musées Royaux du Cinquantenaire

== Associations and foundations ==
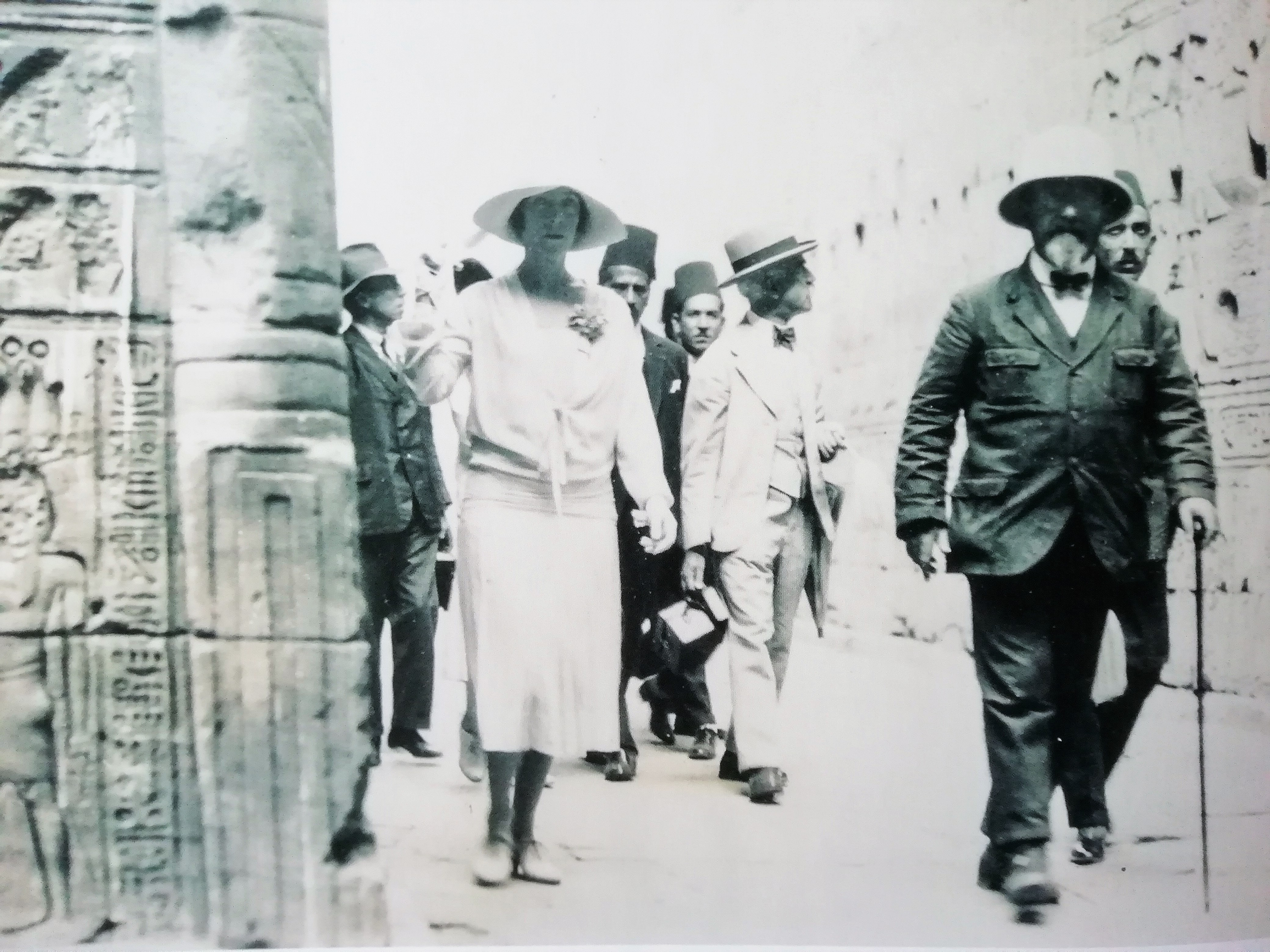
Queen Elisabeth and Jean Capart at the Temple of Horus at Edfu (1930)

On February 18, 1923, he guided Queen Elisabeth of Belgium through the Tomb of Tutankhamun. Following this trip, Capart founded The Association Égyptologique Reine Elisabeth, which publishes the journal Chronique d' Égypte. He also guided the Queen on later trips in Egypt, which included visiting the Temple of Horus at Edfu in 1930.

In 2015, Fonds Jean Capart was set up in his honour "to promote the historical heritage of the Belgian Egyptologist Jean Capart with a view to nurturing both the historical and scientific aspects of Egyptology in Belgium."

== Publications ==
- Conférence sur le préhistorique égyptien – Mémoire de la Société d'Anthropologie de Bruxelles tome XX. 1901–1902.
- Les débuts de l'art en Égypte. 1904.
- Bulletin critique des religions de l'Égypte. 1905.
- Chambre funéraire de la sixième dynastie aux Musées Royaux d'Art & d'Histoire. 1906.
- Une rue de tombeaux à Saqqarah. 1907.
- L'art égyptien. 1909–1911.
- Un roman vécu il y a 25 siècles – Histoire d'une famille sacerdotale égyptienne... 1914.
- Les origines de la civilisation égyptienne. Société d'Anthropologie de Bruxelles. 1914.
- Le centenaire du déchiffrement des hiéroglyphes par Champollion. Bulletin Académie Royale de Belgique. 1922.
- L'Art égyptien et la loi de frontalité. Fondation Piot. 1923.
- La Place de l'Égypte dans la civilisation. Bulletin Société d'Anthropologie. 1923.
- Toutankhamon. 1923.
- Un fragment de naos saïte. Académie Royale de Belgique. 1924.
- L'art égyptien : études et histoire. 1924–1948.
- Memphis à l'ombre des pyramides. 1930.
- Propos sur l'art égyptien. 1931.
- Le Temple des Muses. 1936.
- Histoire de l'Orient ancien – L'Égypte des pharaons. 1936.
- Travels in Egypt – Letters of Ch. Wilbour Brooklyn Museum. 1936.
- Makit. Une histoire de souris au temps des pharaons. 1937.
- Le papyrus Léopold II aux Musées Royaux d'Art et d'Histoire. 1939.
- Visions de l'Égypte ancienne. Association égyptologique Reine Élisabeth. 1940.
- Le Message de la vieille Égypte. 1944.
- Tout-Ankh Amon. 1944.
- Un conte que Schéhérazade n'a pas connu. Association égyptologique Reine Élisabeth. 1946.
- Fouilles d'El Kab – Impressions et souvenirs. Association égyptologique Reine Élisabeth. 1946.
- Je lis les hiéroglyphes. 1946.
- Quelques observations sur la déesse d'El Kab. Association égyptologique Reine Élisabeth. 1946.
- Le Chat de saint Louis. Revue générale. 1947.
- Pour faire aimer l'art égyptien. Association égyptologique Reine Élisabeth. 1949.
- La Beauté égyptienne. 1949.
- Causeries sur l'art égyptien. Association égyptologique Reine Élisabeth. 1958.
