= Chapel at George Fox University =

University chapel in Newberg, Oregon, US

- Entrance of the chapel in 2026
- Chapel at George Fox University
- 45°18′14″N 122°58′01″W
- Location: 415 Carlton Way; Newberg, Oregon, US
- Country: United States
- Website: georgefox.edu/chapel-building/index.html

History
- Dedicated: October 12, 2024

Architecture
- Architect(s): Andrew Burke, Soderstrom Architects
- Style: Northwest modernism
- Years built: 2023–2024
- Completed: 2024
- Construction cost: $11 million

Specifications
- Capacity: 275
- Height: 50 ft (15 m)
- Materials: Brick, wood, glass

The Chapel at George Fox University is a Christian chapel located on the main campus of George Fox University in Newberg, Oregon, United States. Constructed from 2023 to 2024, the $11-million chapel seating 275 was designed in a Northwest modernist style. The chapel includes artwork produced by George Fox University students and faculty.

== History ==
At the urging of GFU president Robin E. Baker, the university board approved the construction of a chapel in 2020. The university had previously used multipurpose spaces and auditoriums as chapels. Baker envisioned the dedicated chapel as being in the tradition of Irish Christianity:

We believe the chapel inspires contemplation, evokes wonder, and fosters a deeper connection with the Lord... In a world driven by technology, we conceived a space to reconnect with something more profound than modern conveniences. It's not a place of escape, but one of significant meaning and genuine connection.

Designed by Andrew Burke of Soderstrom Architects, construction began in 2023. The chapel was completed in spring 2024 and dedicated in October 2024 during GFU's homecoming.

== Architecture ==
The chapel is situated in the center of the GFU campus on the edge of wooded Hess Creek, which bisects the campus. Designed in a modified Pacific Northwest modern style, the chapel's influences include E. Fay Jones' Thorncrown Chapel. According to Burke, the architect, Baker "was interested in it being sort of Northwest modern, but he also loved traditional European churches... So, there were a whole bunch of things that kind of got stirred together."

=== Exterior ===
The exterior of the chapel is sided with Western red cedar and brick veneer above a limestone water table band. The metal-frame windows are clad with wood and the roof is a standing seam metal roof.

Exterior landscaping includes a prayer garden and the addition of several large trees, including giant Sequoias, Douglas firs and incense cedars. In the garden outside the chapel is a 12-foot Celtic cross sculpted by Brendan McGloin.

=== Interior ===
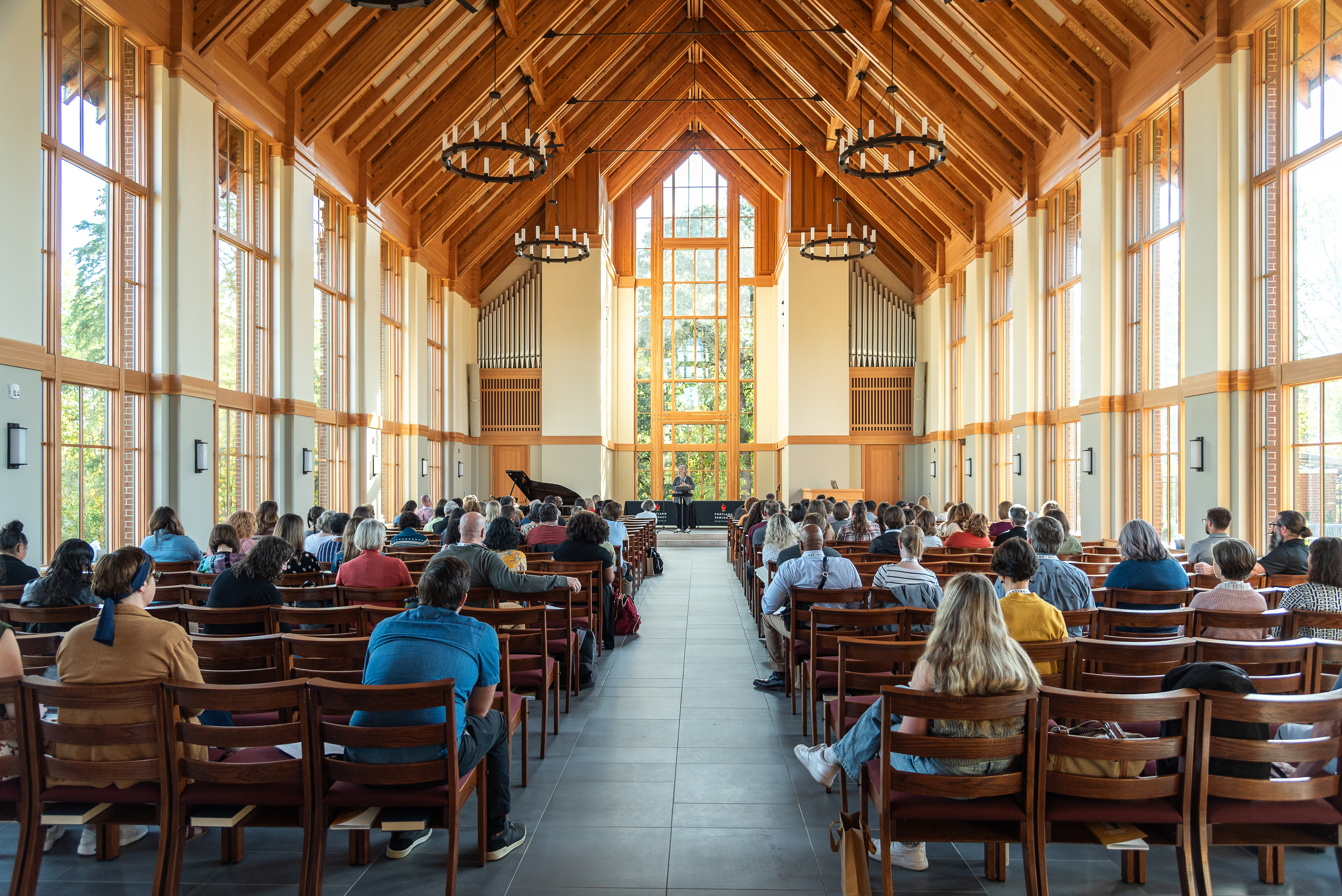
A Portland Seminary event is held in the newly opened George Fox University Chapel in September 2024.

Worshipers enter through 14-foot-tall front doors. The chapel's ceilings rest on exposed glu-lam beams. Interior trim is composed of vertical-grain fir. An electric organ was supplied by Rodgers Instruments.

The rear of the chapel's interior features two 5-by-17-foot murals painted by GFU faculty member Tim Timmerman with the assistance of art student Alissa Hrushka. Entitled The Peaceable Kingdom Come, the pair of murals is based on Quaker artist Edward Hicks' The Peaceable Kingdom. Timmerman's murals incorporate biblical imagery and Oregon wildlife, including the western meadowlark (Oregon's state bird). People depicted sitting peacefully alongside animals are modeled on GFU students and alumni. Motifs toward the top of the murals include imagery from Revelation and visions of angels, also modeled on GFU community members.

Stained glass windows were designed by Timmerman's students and then adapted and produced by Waco, Texas-based artist Bryant Stanton. The chapel's 23 stained glass windows depict scenes from the Bible; seven scenes each from the Old Testament and the New Testament appear on the left and right sides of the chapel, respectively. Timmerman and Stanton matched the palettes of the windows and the murals, with the lower portions of each incorporating more blues and greens and the upper portions incorporating yellows, oranges and purples. Stained glass scenes from the works of C. S. Lewis and J. R. R. Tolkien appear in the chapel library located adjacent to the vestibule.

Other artwork in the chapel includes a bronze sculpture of the Last Supper by Scott Rogers and a full set of all seven volumes of the Saint John's Bible, a hand-calligraphed Bible produced at Saint John's Abbey in Minnesota, known for being the first Bible to be calligraphed by hand for more than 500 years. The library includes several rare volumes donated by Baker, including a 1950 printing of Lewis' The Lion, the Witch and the Wardrobe signed by illustrator Pauline Baynes.

== Gallery ==
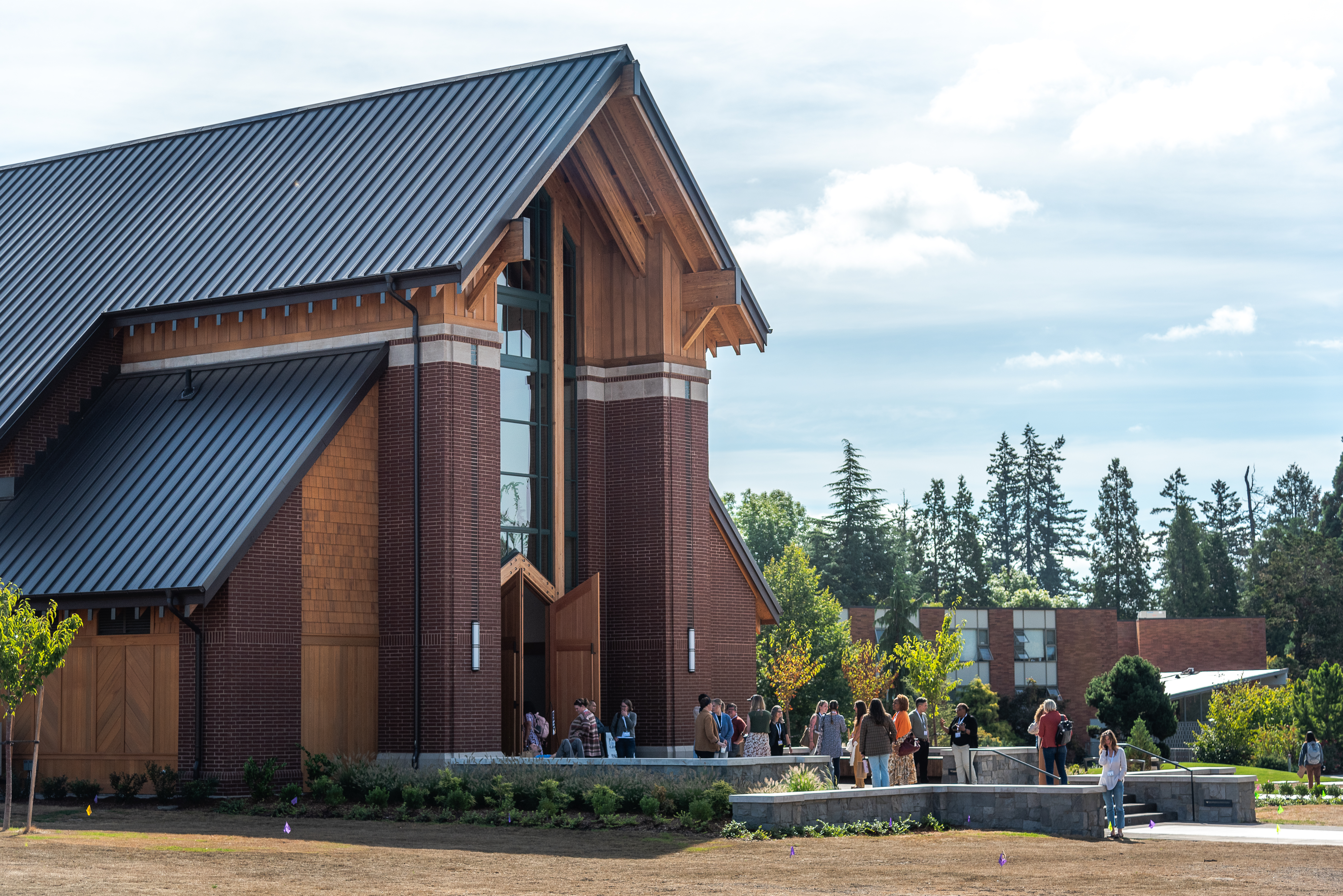
The west front of the chapel

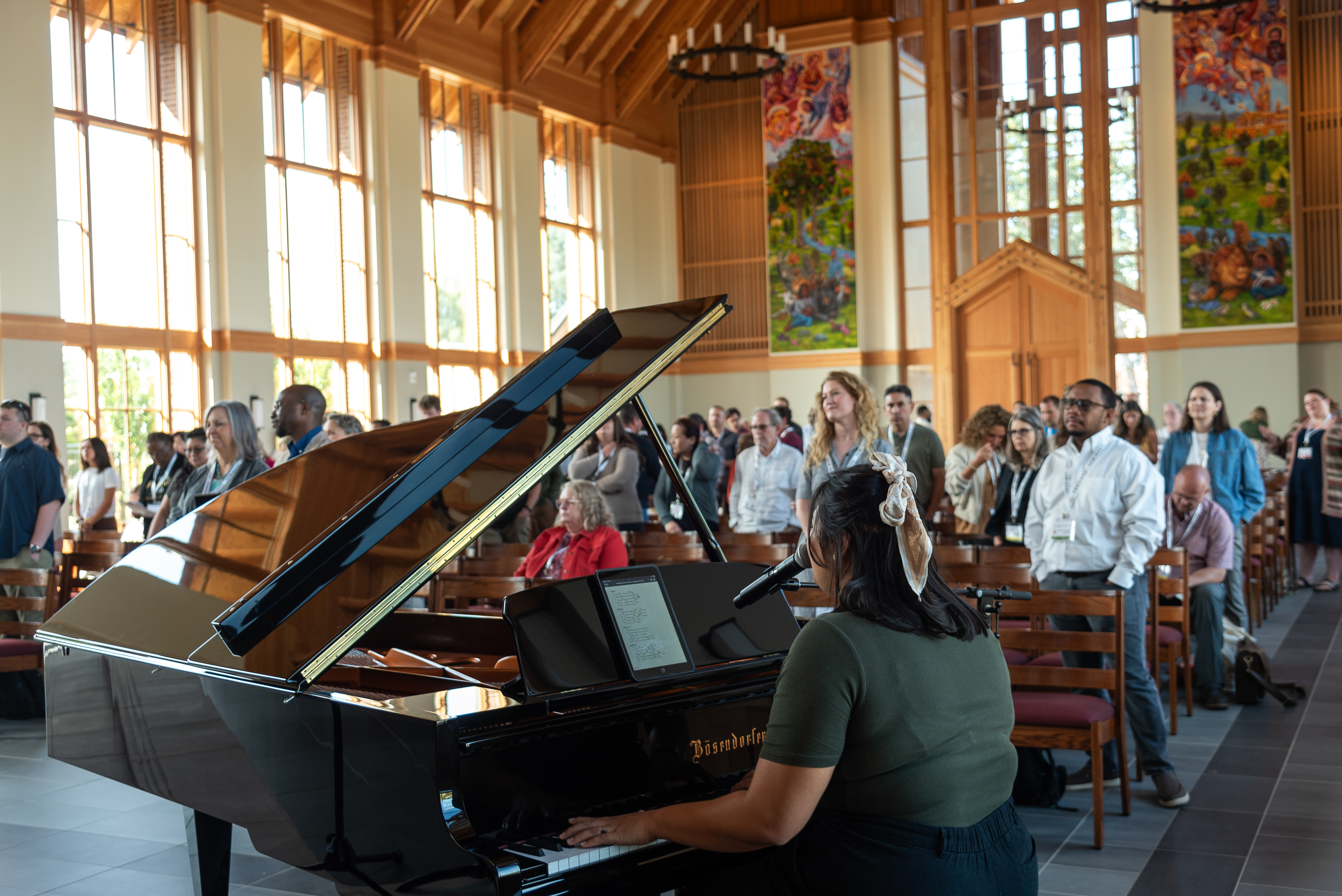
Looking toward the entrance of the chapel

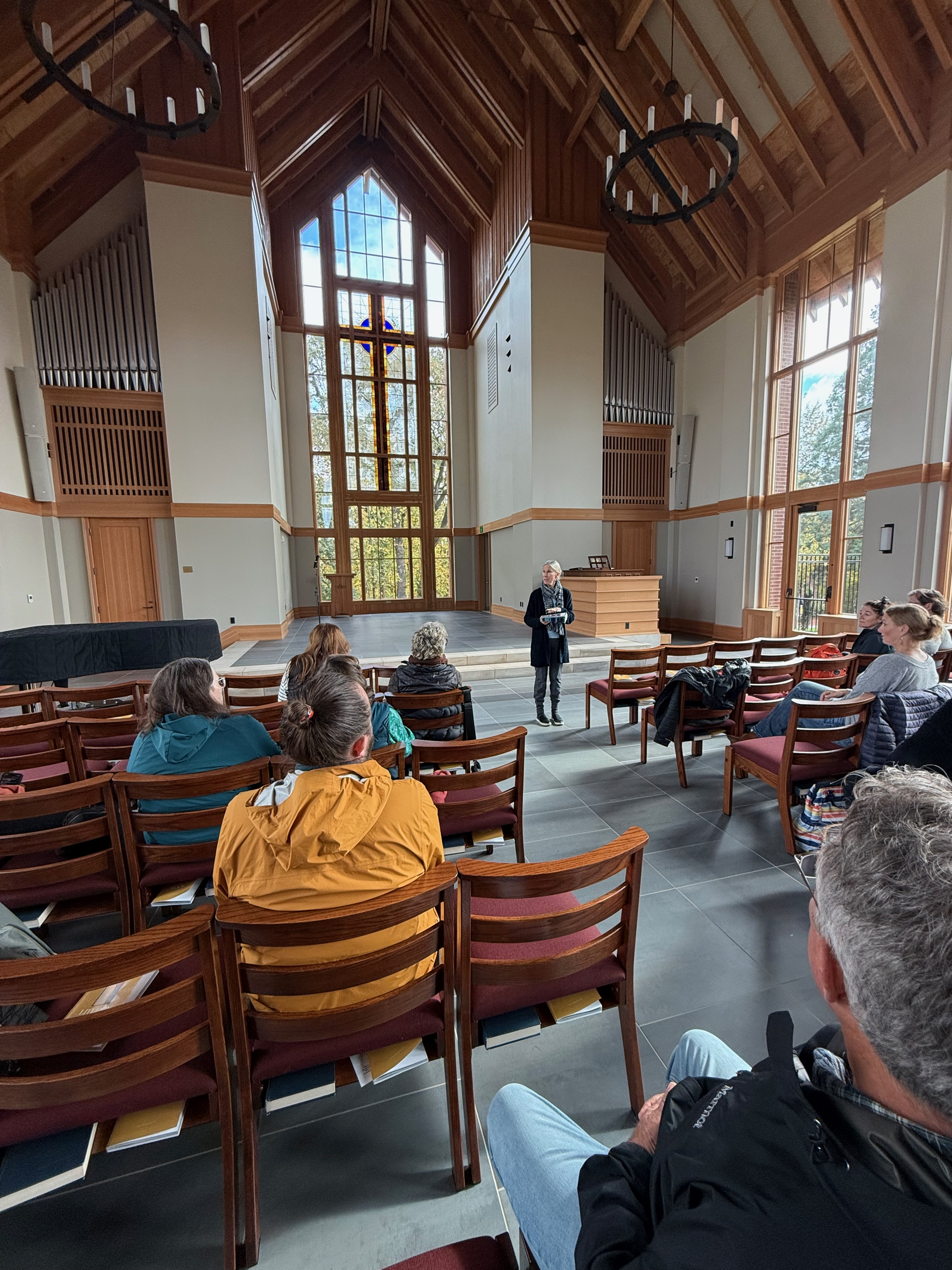
The chapel interior

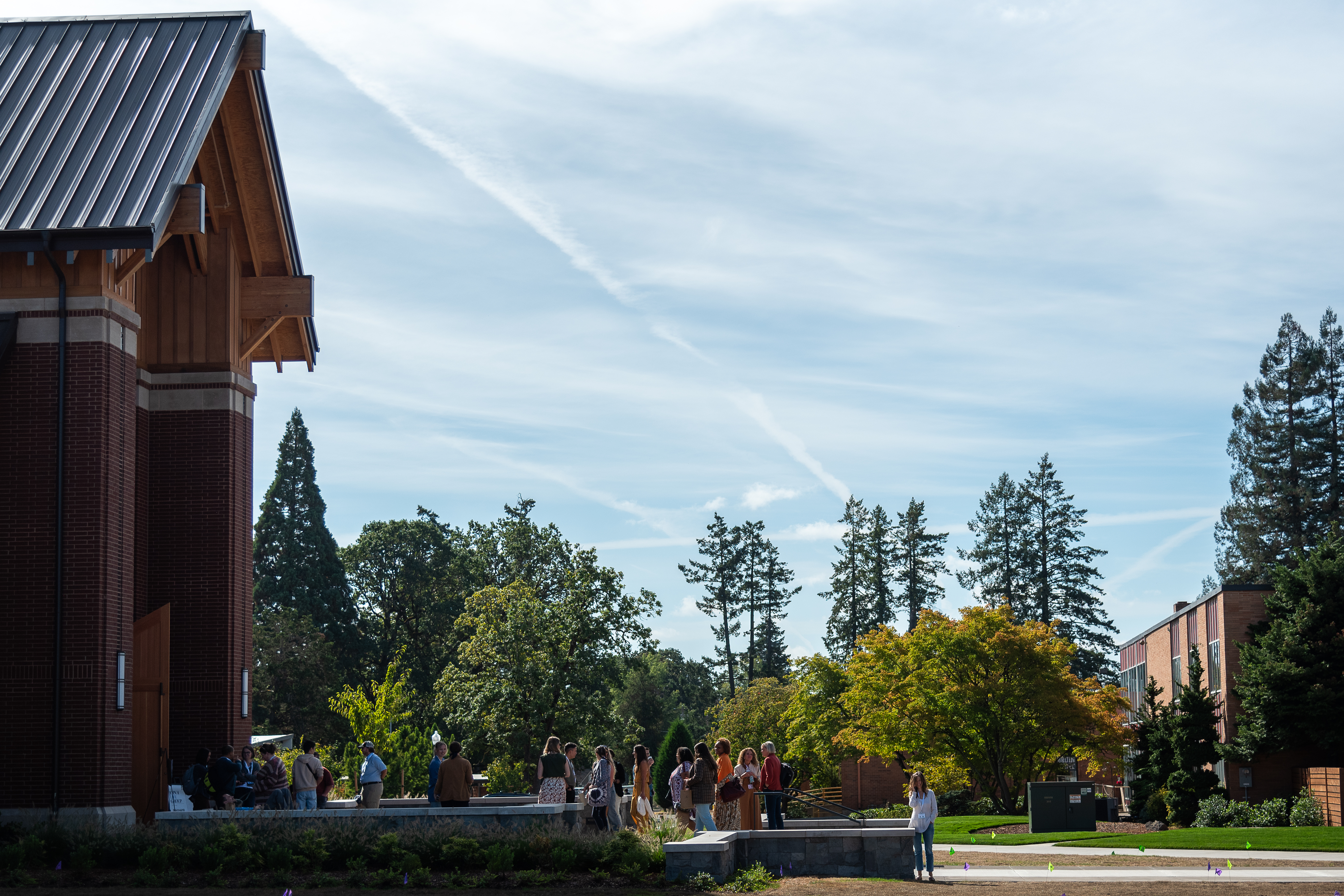
The chapel's entrance plaza situated on the GFU campus
