= Mark David Hall =

- Born: February 22, 1966 (age 60)
- Education: Wheaton College (IL) (BA); University of Virginia (PhD)
- Scientific career
- Fields: Politics
- Workplaces: Regent University (2023-present); George Fox University (2001-2023); East Central University (1993-2001)
- Website: www.markdavidhall.org

Mark David Hall (born 22 February 1966) is a professor in Regent University's Robertson School of Government and Director of Religious Liberty in the States, an initiative of First Liberty's Center for Religion, Culture & Democracy. Mark is also Faculty Fellow at George Fox University, a Senior Fellow at the Center for the Study of Law and Religion at Emory University, and a Senior Fellow at Baylor University’s Institute for Studies of Religion. In 2022-2023, he was a Garwood Visiting Fellow at Princeton University’s James Madison Program and a Visiting Scholar at the Mercatus Center.

Hall is the author of a number of books on religion and politics in America. The majority of his research has been in religion in the American founding era. His most recent book, "Who's Afraid of Christian Nationalism? Why Christian Nationalism is Not an Existential Threat to America or the Christian Church" was published in April 2024.

== Education ==
Hall graduated with a Bachelor of Arts degree in Political Science from Wheaton College (IL) in 1988 and received his Doctor of Philosophy in from the University of Virginia in 1993.

== Early career ==
Before his 2023 hiring at Regent University, Hall taught at George Fox University (2001-2023) and at East Central University (1993-2001). His primary teaching fields are political theory, constitutional law, and religious liberty / church–state relations in America.

== Later career ==
Hall's scholarly work is focused on issues of religion in the American founding era. In particular, his writing is often concerned with the perception that the Founders were deists who desired the strict separation of church and state. Instead, he argues that there are good reasons to believe that many founders were influenced by orthodox Christianity and that virtually none of them favored anything approximating a contemporary understanding of a wall of separation. Hall argues that the modern conception has negatively affected how the Supreme Court has interpreted the religion clauses of the First Amendment.

Mark has served or is serving as an expert witness for the United States Department of Justice, the Alliance Defending Freedom, the State of Arkansas, the Institute for Justice, the State of Texas, and the State of Indiana.

== Selected bibliography ==
=== Books ===
- Hall, Mark David. Who's Afraid of Christian Nationalism? Why Christian Nationalism is Not an Existential Threat to America or the Christian Church. Fidelis Publishing, 2024.
- Hall, Mark David. Proclaim Liberty Throughout All the Land: How Christianity Has Advanced Freedom and Equality for All Americans. Fidelis Publishing, 2023.
- Hall, Mark David. Did America Have a Christian Founding? Separating Myth from Historical Truth. Thomas Nelson, 2019.
- Hall, Mark David and Daniel L. Dreisbach, ed. Great Christian Jurists in American History. New York: Cambridge University Press, 2019.
- Hall, Mark David and Daryl Charles, ed. America and the Just War Tradition: A History of U.S. Conflicts. Notre Dame: University of Notre Dame Press, 2019.
- Hall, Mark David, ed. Collected Works of Roger Sherman. Indianapolis: Liberty Fund Press, 2016.
- Hall, Mark David. Roger Sherman and the Creation of the American Republic. New York: Oxford University Press, 2013.
- Hall, Mark David. Roger Sherman and the Creation of the American Republic. Oxford Scholarship Online: Oxford University Press, 2013.
- Hall, Mark David and Gary L. Gregg II. America's Forgotten Founders. Wilmington: ISI Books, 2011.
- Hall, Mark David and Daniel L. Dreisbach, ed. The Sacred Rights of Conscience: Selected Readings on Religious Liberty and Church-State Relations in the American Founding. Indianapolis: Liberty Fund Press, 2009.
- Hall, Mark David, Daniel L. Dreisbach, and Jeffry H. Morrison, ed. The Forgotten Founders on Religion and Public Life. Notre Dame: University of Notre Dame Press, 2009.
- Hall, Mark David, Kermit L. Hall, and James Wilson, ed. Collected Works of James Wilson, 2 Vols. Indianapolis: Liberty Funds Press, 2007.
- Hall, Mark David, Daniel L. Dreisbach, and Jeffry H. Morrison, ed. The Founders on God and Government. Lanham: Rowman & Littlefield Publishers, 2004.
- Hall, Mark David. The Political and Legal Philosophy of James Wilson, 1742-1798. Columbia: University of Missouri, 1997.

=== Journal articles ===
- “History, Tradition, and the Right of Parents to Direct the Education and Moral Formation oftheir Children.” With Christian Edmonds and S. Ernie Walton. Forthcoming, Texas Review of Law & Politics.
- “Ten Commandments in the Public Square and Public Schools.” With Andrea Picciotti-Bayer. William and Mary Bill of Rights Journal. 34 (2025), 175-237.
- “Foundations of the Right of Charitable Uses.” With Adam J. MacLeod. Mississippi Law Journal 94 (February 2025), 251-320 (Peer Reviewed).
- Hall, Mark D. (Summer 2002). "Beyond self-interest: the political theory and practice of evangelical women in Antebellum America". Journal of Church and State. 44 (3): 477–99. doi:10.1093/jcs/44.3.477.
- Hall, Mark D. (2006). "Jeffersonian walls and Madisonian lines: the Supreme Court's use of history in religion clause cases". Oregon Law Review. 85 (2). University of Oregon: 563–614. Pdf.
- Hall, Mark D. (October 26, 2015). "Religious Accommodations and the Common Good". Heritage Foundation Backgrounder. Archived from the original on October 27, 2015.
- Hall, Mark D. (Spring 2014). "Madison's Memorial and Remonstrance, Jefferson's Statute for Religious Liberty, and the Creation of the First Amendment". American Political Thought. 3: 32–63. doi:10.1086/675647. S2CID 153941275.
