= Robin E. Baker =

American historian and academic administrator

Robin Baker
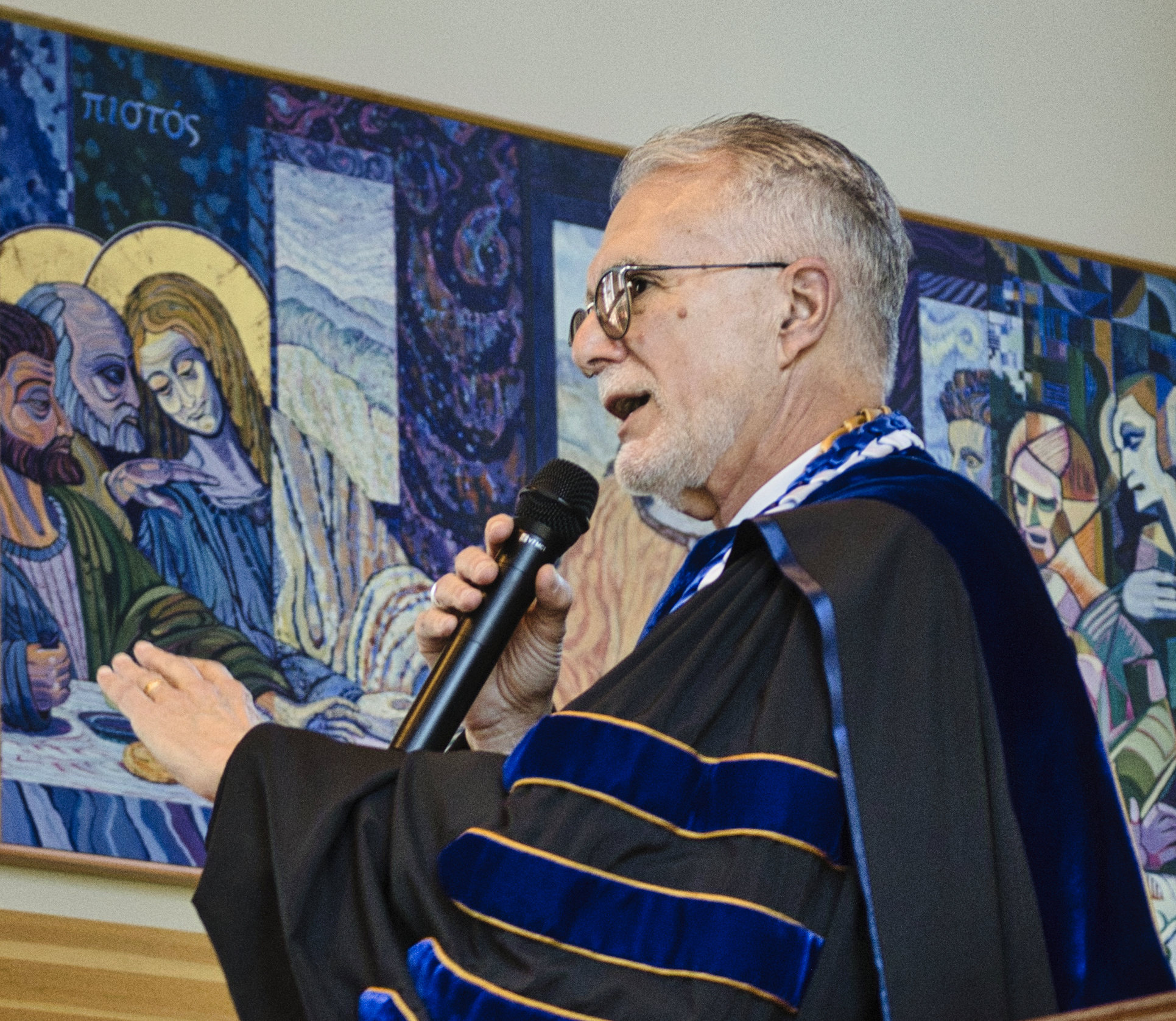
- Baker speaks at the 2026 Portland Seminary commencement in the Chapel at George Fox University

12th President of George Fox University
- Incumbent
- Assumed office 2007

Personal details
- Born: Phoenix, Arizona, U.S.
- Education: Grand Canyon University (BA); Hardin–Simmons University (MA); Texas A&M University (PhD)

Robin E. Baker is an American historian and academic administrator, currently serving as the 12th President of George Fox University in Newberg, Oregon. Since he took office in 2007, George Fox has grown to become the largest private university in Oregon.

== Early life and education ==
Baker was born and raised in Phoenix, Arizona. He played basketball for and earned a Bachelor of Arts degree from Grand Canyon University, graduating with high honors. He then received a Master of Arts in history from Hardin–Simmons University and a PhD in history from Texas A&M University.

== Career ==
Baker began his career in academics as an assistant professor of history at Wheaton College from 1989 to 1992. He then worked as an assistant professor of history at John Brown University in Arkansas from 1992 to 1994.

Baker returned to his alma mater, Grand Canyon University, in 1994 first as an associate professor of history. In 1996, he was named dean of the College of Liberal Arts. In 1997, he became vice president for academic affairs, and in 1998 he was named senior vice president.

Baker joined the faculty of George Fox University in 1999, and served as provost until he was selected by the Board of Trustees as the university's next president in 2007.

Baker is on the executive committee of the ACE Commission on Faith-based Colleges and Universities. He is a board member for the Council of Independent Colleges and serves on the NCAA Division III Board of Governors Subcommittee on Congressional Engagement & Action. Baker also served as one of the commissioners for the Northwest Commission on Colleges and Universities, the accrediting body for higher education in the Northwest.

== Recognition ==
The Portland Business Journal named Baker one of its 2023 Executives of the Year for his exceptional performance as president.
