= Rick Johnson (writer) =

Christian author

Rick I. Johnson (born April 26, 1956) is an American Christian author and speaker focusing on parenting, marriage, fathering, personal growth, character development, and masculinity. Johnson holds a Bachelor of Arts degree in Management and Organizational Leadership from George Fox University and a Masters of Education from Concordia University in Portland, Oregon. He is the author of 13 books (five bestsellers), and his books have been translated into 15 languages.

He is the founder and president of Better Dads Ministries., a 501(c)3 not-for-profit fathering skills program. His books have expanded his work to include influencing the whole family. Besides presenting workshops for parents and couples, he also developed a mentoring program for fatherless boys called Standing Tall (mentoring program). Mr. Johnson was invited to the White House in 2012 as part of the Champions of Change program in recognition for his work with men and fathers. He frequently works with military special forces for the Navy and Army. Other outreach activities include a summer camp for single moms and their children, a fatherless boy mentoring program called Standing Tall, as well as training workshops for men in prisons across the United States. His messages frequently promote that men and boys are vital to the fabric of society.

== Biography ==
Prior to becoming a bestselling author and speaker, Johnson was a small business owner for 16 years, owning and operating an environmental engineering firm. He is a veteran of the United States Navy, has served on the Board of Directors for several community and business associations, and has appeared on hundreds of radio and television shows across the US and Canada.

== Published works ==
- That’s My Son: How Moms Can Influence Boys to Become Men of Character
- Better Dads, Stronger Sons: How dads Can Guide Boys to Become men of Character
- The Man Whisperer: Speaking Your Man’s Language to Bring Out His Best
- The Power of a Man: Using Your Influence as a Man of Character
- Becoming Your Spouse’s Better Half: Why Differences Make a Marriage Great
- That’s My Teenage Son: How Moms Can Influence Their Boys to Become Good Men
- " Becoming the dad Your Daughter Needs"
- "Understanding the Man You Love"
- How to Talk so Your Husband will Listen, and Listen so Your Husband will Talk"
- "A Man in the Making"
- "Romancing Your Better Half"
- "10 Things Great dads Do"
- " Overcoming Toxic Parenting: Becoming a Good Parent When Yours Wasn't"
- "When Grandparents Become Parents"
