= History of Christianity in the United States =

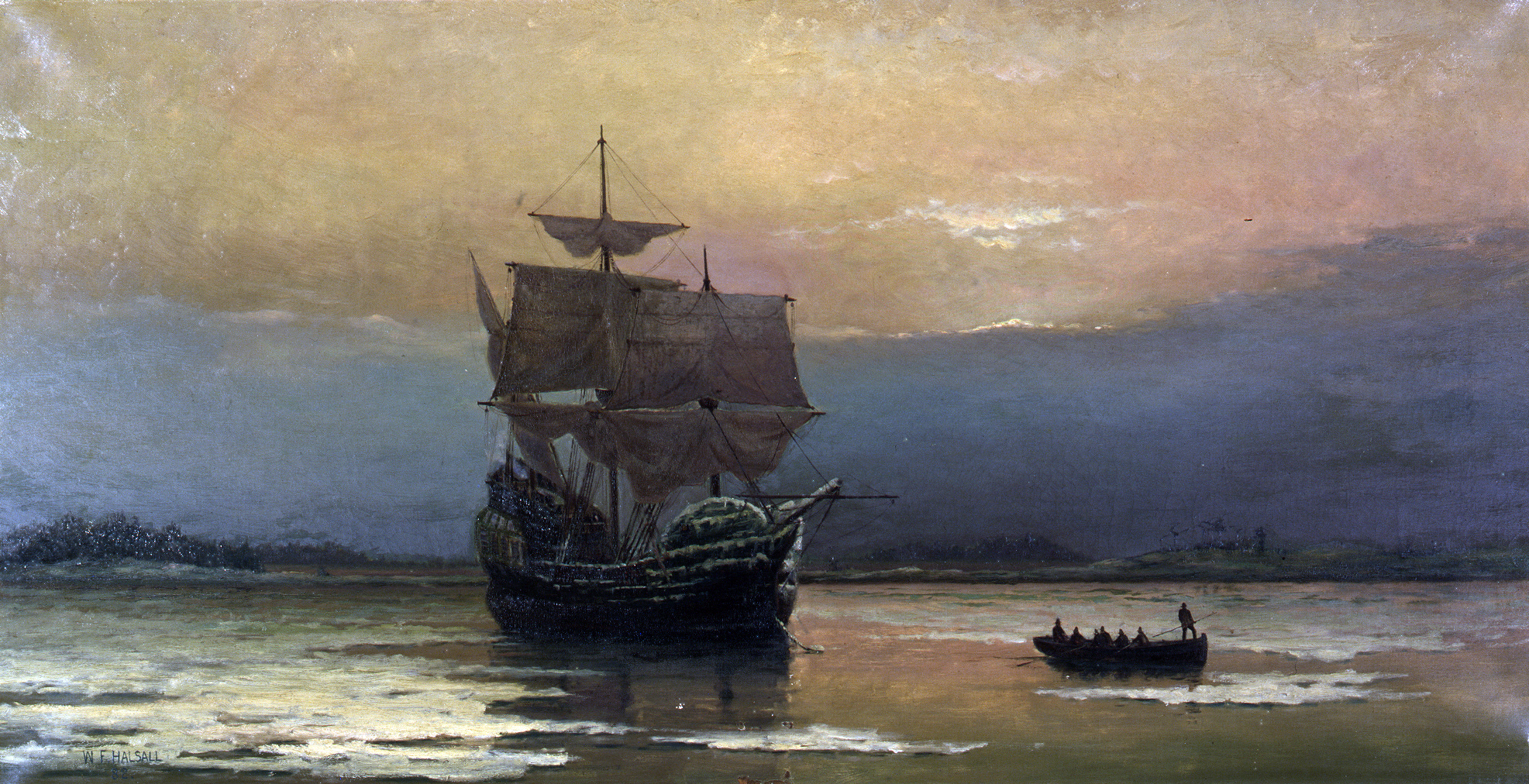
Mayflower in Plymouth Harbor by William Halsall (1882)

Christianity was introduced to North America as it was colonized by Europeans beginning in the 16th and 17th centuries. The Spanish, French, and British brought Roman Catholicism to the colonies of New Spain, New France and Maryland respectively, while Northern European peoples introduced Protestantism to Massachusetts Bay Colony, New Netherland, Virginia colony, Carolina Colony, Newfoundland and Labrador, and Lower Canada. Among Protestants, adherents to Anglicanism, Methodism, the Baptist Church, Congregationalism, Presbyterianism, Lutheranism, Quakerism, Mennonite and the Moravian Church were the first to settle in the US, spreading their faith in the new country.

Today most Christians in the United States are Mainline Protestant, Evangelical, or Roman Catholic.

== Early Colonial era ==
Because the Spanish were the first Europeans to establish settlements on the mainland of North America, such as St. Augustine, Florida, in 1565, the earliest Christians in the territory which would eventually become the United States were Roman Catholics. However, the territory that would become the Thirteen Colonies in 1776 was largely populated by Protestants due to Protestant settlers seeking religious freedom from the Church of England (est. 1534). These settlers were primarily Puritans from East Anglia, especially just before the English Civil War (1641–1651); there were also some Anglicans and Catholics but these were far fewer in number. Because of the predominance of Protestants among those coming from England, the English colonies became almost entirely Protestant by the time of the American Revolution. (Note: In 1634, even Maryland, the colony with the most Catholics, had less than 3,000 Catholics out of a population of 34,000. By 1785, when the population of the 13 Colonies was nearly four million, there were fewer than 25,000 Catholics.)

=== Spanish missions ===
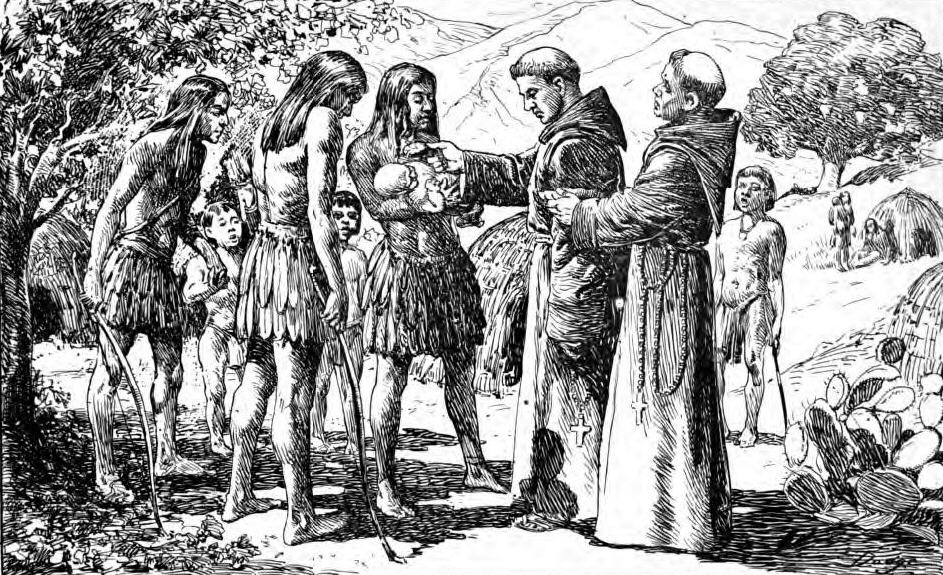
The first recorded baptism in Alta California. Taken from p. 285 of San Juan Capistrano Mission by Engelhardt, Zephyrin (1922). The baptisms were performed at Los Cristianitos, "The Canyon of the Little Christians", in what is now San Diego county, just south of Mission San Juan Capistrano

Catholicism first came to the territories now forming the United States just before the Protestant Reformation (1517) with the Spanish conquistadors and settlers in present-day Florida (1513) and the southwest. The first Christian worship service held in the current United States was a Catholic Mass celebrated in Pensacola, Florida (St. Michael records). The Spanish spread Roman Catholicism through Spanish Florida by way of its mission system; these missions extended into Georgia and the Carolinas. Eventually, Spain established missions in what are now Texas, New Mexico, Arizona, and California. Junípero Serra (d. 1784) founded a series of missions in California which became important economic, political, and religious institutions. Overland routes were established from New Mexico that resulted in the colonization of San Francisco in 1776 and Los Angeles in 1781.

=== French territories ===
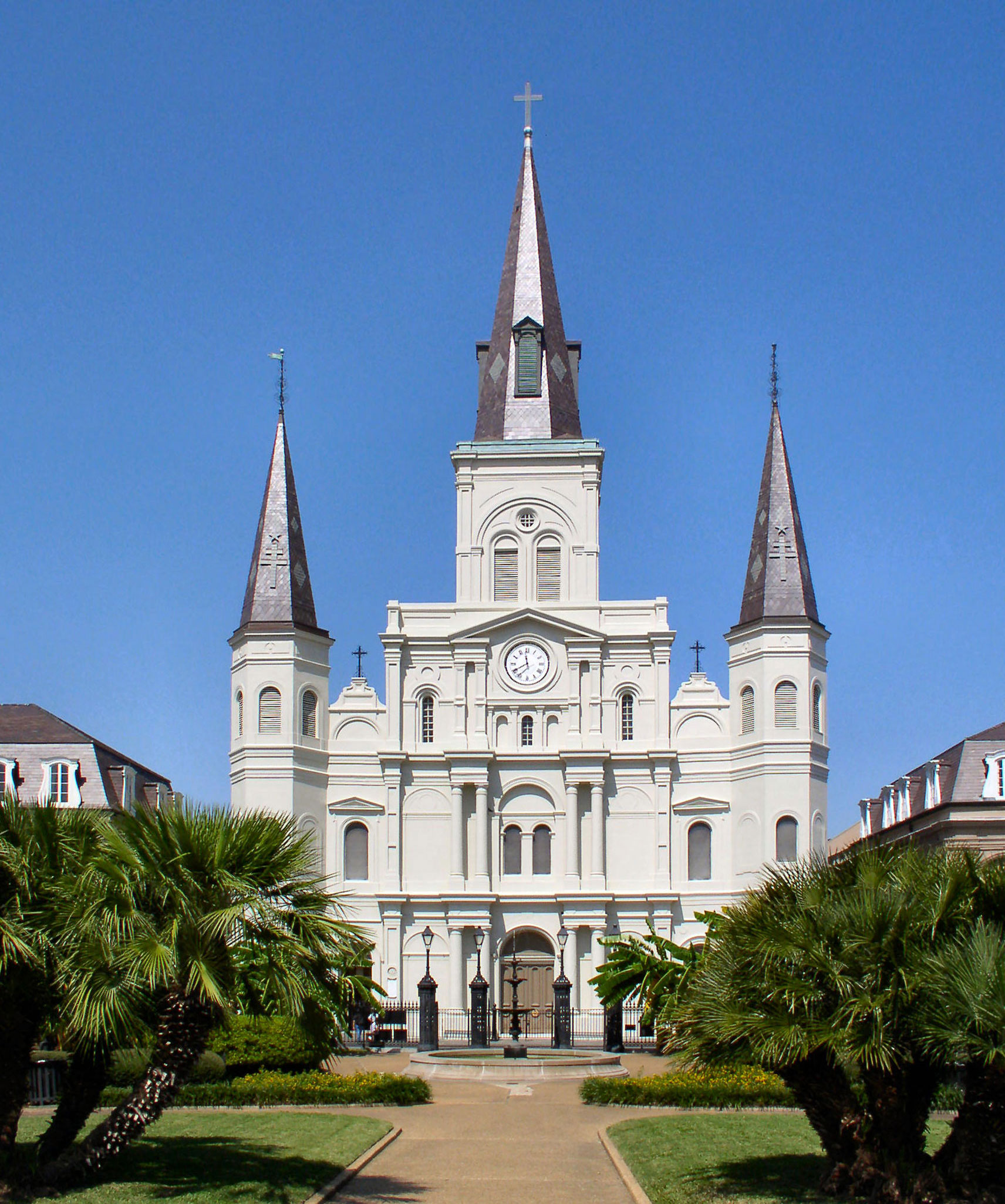
Saint Louis Cathedral in New Orleans

In the French territories, Catholicism was ushered in with the establishment of colonies and forts in Detroit, St. Louis, Mobile, Biloxi, Baton Rouge, and New Orleans. In the late 17th century, French expeditions, which included sovereign, religious and commercial aims, established a foothold on the Mississippi River and Gulf Coast. With its first settlements, France lay claim to a vast region of North America and set out to establish a commercial empire and French nation stretching from the Gulf of Mexico to Canada.

The French colony of Louisiana originally claimed all the land on both sides of the Mississippi River and the lands that drained into it. The following present day states were part of the then vast tract of Louisiana: Louisiana, Mississippi, Arkansas, Oklahoma, Missouri, Kansas, Nebraska, Iowa, Illinois, Indiana, Michigan, Wisconsin, Minnesota, North Dakota, and South Dakota.

=== British colonies ===
Many of the British North American colonies that eventually formed the United States of America were settled in the 17th century by men and women, who, in the face of European religious persecution, refused to compromise passionately held religious convictions (largely stemming from the Protestant Reformation which began c. 1517) and fled Europe.

==== Virginia ====
The Church of England was legally established in the Colony of Virginia in 1619, and authorities in England sent 22 Anglican clergyman by 1624. In practice, establishment meant that local taxes were funneled through the local parish to handle the needs of local government, such as roads and relief for the poor, in addition to the salary of the minister. There was no bishop in colonial Virginia, and in practice the local vestry, consisting of laymen, controlled the parish.

As in England, the parish became a unit of local importance. It was led spiritually by a rector and governed by a vestry – a committee of members who were generally respected in the community. A typical parish contained three or four churches, as the parish churches needed to be close enough for people to travel to worship services, where attendance was expected of everyone. Parishes typically had a church farm (or "glebe") to help support it financially.

The colonists were typically inattentive, uninterested, and bored during church services, according to the ministers, who complained that the people were sleeping, whispering, ogling the fashionably dressed women, walking about and coming and going, or at best looking out the windows or staring blankly into space. There were too few ministers for the widely scattered population, so ministers encouraged parishioners to become devout at home, using the Book of Common Prayer for private prayer and devotion (rather than the Bible). This allowed devout Anglicans to lead an active and sincere religious life apart from the unsatisfactory formal church services. The stress on personal piety opened the way for the First Great Awakening, which pulled people away from the established church.

==== New England ====
A group which later became known as the Pilgrims settled the Plymouth Colony in Plymouth, Massachusetts, in 1620, seeking refuge from conflicts in England which led up to the English Civil War.

The Puritans, a much larger group than the Pilgrims, established the Massachusetts Bay Colony in 1629 with 400 settlers. Puritans were English Protestants who wished to reform and purify the Church of England in the New World of what they considered to be unacceptable residues of Roman Catholicism. Within two years, an additional 2,000 settlers arrived. Beginning in 1630, as many as 20,000 Puritans emigrated to America from England to gain the liberty to worship as they chose. Most settled in New England, but some went as far as the West Indies. Theologically, the Puritans were "non-separating Congregationalists". The Puritans created a deeply religious, socially tight-knit and politically innovative culture that is still present in the modern United States. They hoped the new land of would serve as a "redeemer nation".

The Salem witch trials, by the Puritans, were a series of hearings before local magistrates followed by county court trials to prosecute people accused of witchcraft in Essex, Suffolk and Middlesex counties of colonial Massachusetts, between February 1692 and May 1693. Over 150 people were arrested and imprisoned, with even more accused but not formally pursued by the authorities. The two courts convicted twenty-nine people of the capital felony of witchcraft. Nineteen of the accused, fourteen women and five men, were hanged. One man (Giles Corey) who refused to enter a plea was crushed to death under heavy stones in an attempt to force him to do so. At least five more of the accused died in prison.

==== Tolerance in Rhode Island, Delaware, and Pennsylvania ====
Roger Williams, who preached religious tolerance, separation of church and state, and a complete break with the Church of England, was banished from the Massachusetts Bay Colony and founded Rhode Island Colony, which became a haven for other religious refugees from the Puritan community. Some migrants who came to Colonial America were in search of the freedom to practice forms of Christianity which were prohibited and persecuted in Europe. Since there was no state religion, in fact there was not yet a state, and since Protestantism had no central authority, religious practice in the colonies became diverse.

Delaware was originally settled by Lutherans of New Sweden. When the Dutch of New Netherland conquered the colony, the Swedes and Finns were allowed to retain their religious institutions. Similarly, when the English subsequently took over the Dutch colonial holdings, the religious autonomy of the Dutch, Swedes, and Finns persisted, creating a culture of increased religious tolerance.

The Religious Society of Friends formed in England in 1652 around leader George Fox. Quakers were severely persecuted in England for daring to deviate so far from Anglicanism. This reign of terror impelled Friends to seek refuge in New Jersey in the 1670s, formally part of New Netherland, where they became well entrenched. In 1681, when Quaker leader William Penn parlayed a debt owed by Charles II to his father into a charter for the Province of Pennsylvania, many more Quakers were prepared to grasp the opportunity to live in a land where they might worship freely. By 1685, as many as 8,000 Quakers had come to Pennsylvania and Delaware. Although the Quakers may have resembled the Puritans in some religious beliefs and practices, they differed with them over the necessity of compelling religious uniformity in society.

Pennsylvania Germans are inaccurately known as Pennsylvania Dutch from a misunderstanding of "Pennsylvania Deutsch", the group's German language name. The first group of Germans to settle in Pennsylvania arrived in Philadelphia in 1683 from Krefeld, Germany, and included Mennonites and possibly some Dutch Quakers.

The efforts of the founding fathers to find a proper role for their support of religion—and the degree to which religion can be supported by public officials without being inconsistent with the revolutionary imperative of freedom of religion for all citizens—is a question that is still debated in the country today.

==== Maryland ====
Catholicism was introduced to the English colonies with the founding of the Province of Maryland by Jesuits accompanying settlers from England in 1634. Maryland was one of the few regions among the English colonies in North America that was predominantly Catholic.

However, the 1646 defeat of the Royalists in the English Civil War led to stringent laws against Catholic education and the extradition of known Jesuits from the colony, including Andrew White, and the destruction of their school at Calverton Manor. During the greater part of the Maryland colonial period, Jesuits continued to conduct Catholic schools clandestinely.

Maryland was a rare example of religious toleration in a fairly intolerant age, particularly amongst other English colonies which frequently exhibited a militant Protestantism. The Maryland Toleration Act, issued in 1649, was one of the first laws that explicitly defined tolerance of varieties of religion (as long as it was Christian). It has been considered a precursor to the First Amendment.

Although the Stuart kings of England did not hate the Roman Catholic Church, their subjects often did, causing Catholics to be harassed and persecuted in England throughout the 17th century. Driven by the "duty of finding a refuge for his Roman Catholic brethren," George Calvert obtained a Maryland charter from Charles I in 1632 for the territory between Pennsylvania and Virginia. In 1634, two ships, the Ark and the Dove, brought the first settlers to Maryland. Aboard were approximately two hundred people.

Roman Catholic fortunes fluctuated in Maryland during the rest of the 17th century, as they became an increasingly smaller minority of the population. After the Glorious Revolution of 1689 in England, penal laws deprived Roman Catholics of the right to vote, hold office, educate their children or worship publicly. Until the American Revolution, Roman Catholics in Maryland were dissenters in their English colony. At the time of the Revolution, Roman Catholics formed less than 1% of the population of the thirteen colonies. In 2007, Roman Catholics comprised 24% of US population..

==== Anti-Catholicism ====
American Anti-Catholicism has its origins in the Reformation. Because the Reformation was based on an effort to correct what it perceived to be errors and excesses of the Catholic Church, it formed strong positions against the Roman clerical hierarchy and the papacy in particular. These positions were brought to the New World by British colonists who were predominantly Protestant, and who opposed not only the Roman Catholic Church but also the Church of England which, due to its perpetuation of some Catholic doctrine and practices, was deemed to be insufficiently reformed (see also Ritualism). Because many of the British colonists, such as the Puritans, were fleeing religious persecution by the Church of England, early American religious culture exhibited a more extreme anti-Catholic bias of these Protestant denominations.

Monsignor Ellis wrote that a universal anti-Catholic bias was "vigorously cultivated in all the thirteen colonies from Massachusetts to Georgia" and that Colonial charters and laws contained specific proscriptions against Roman Catholics. Ellis also wrote that a common hatred of the Roman Catholic Church could unite Anglican clerics and Puritan ministers despite their differences and conflicts.

=== Russian America ===
Russian traders settled in Alaska during the 18th century. In 1740, a Divine Liturgy was celebrated on board a Russian ship off the Alaskan coast. In 1794, the Russian Orthodox Church sent missionaries—among them Herman of Alaska—to establish a formal mission in Alaska. Their missionary endeavors contributed to the conversion of many Alaskan natives to the Orthodox faith. A diocese was established, whose first bishop was Innocent of Alaska.

At Sitka, the Sitka Lutheran Church was built for Finns.

== 18th century ==
By 1780 the percentage of adult colonists who adhered to a church was between 10% and 30%, not counting slaves or Native Americans. North Carolina had the lowest percentage at about 4%, while New Hampshire and South Carolina were tied for the highest, at about 16%.

=== Great Awakening ===
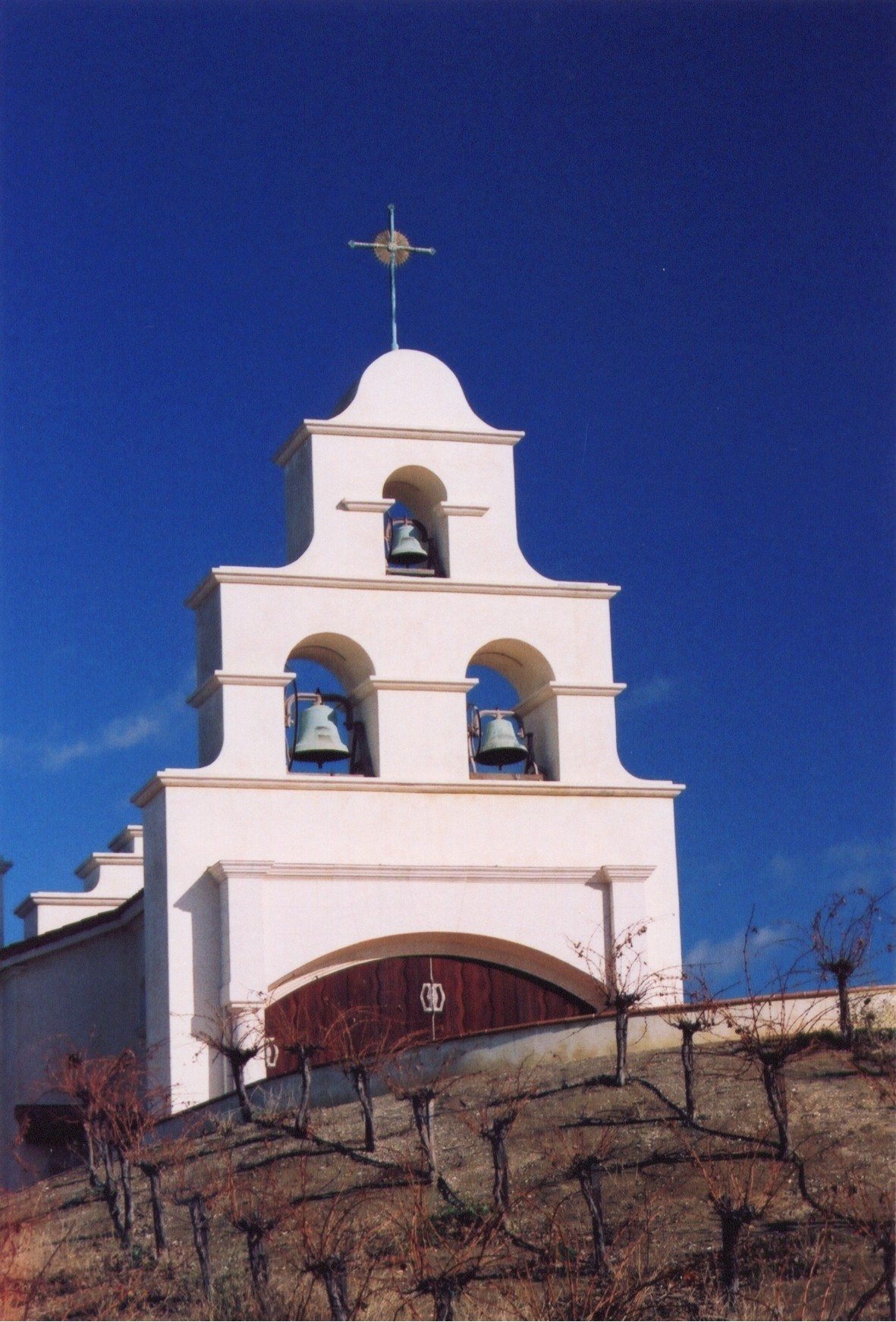
A Christian church in Shandon, California

Evangelicalism is difficult to date and to define. Scholars have argued that, as a self-conscious movement, evangelicalism did not arise until the mid-17th century, perhaps not until the Great Awakening itself. The fundamental premise of evangelicalism is the conversion of individuals from a state of sin to a "new birth" through preaching of the Word. The Great Awakening refers to a northeastern Protestant revival movement that took place in the 1730s and 1740s.

The first generation of New England Puritans required that church members undergo a conversion experience that they could describe publicly. Their successors were not as successful in reaping harvests of redeemed souls. The movement began with Jonathan Edwards, a Massachusetts preacher who sought to return to the Pilgrims' strict Calvinist roots. British preacher George Whitefield and other itinerant preachers continued the movement, traveling across the colonies and preaching in a dramatic and emotional style. Followers of Edwards and other preachers of similar religiosity called themselves the "New Lights" as contrasted with the "Old Lights" who disapproved of their movement. To promote their viewpoints, the two sides established academies and colleges, including Princeton and Williams College. The Great Awakening has been called the first truly American event.

The supporters of the Awakening and its evangelical thrust—Presbyterians, Baptists and Methodists—became the largest American Protestant denominations by the first decades of the 19th century. By the 1770s, the Baptists were growing rapidly both in the north (where they founded Brown University) and in the South. Opponents of the Awakening or those split by it—Anglicans, Quakers, and Congregationalists—were left behind.

=== American Revolution ===
The Revolution split some denominations, notably the Church of England, whose ministers were bound by oath to support the king, and the Quakers, who were traditionally pacifists. Religious practice suffered in certain places because of the absence of ministers and the destruction of churches, but in other areas religion flourished.

The American Revolution inflicted deeper wounds on the Church of England in America than on any other denomination because the King of England was the head of the church. The Book of Common Prayer offered prayers for the monarch, beseeching God "to be his defender and keeper, giving him victory over all his enemies", who in 1776 were American soldiers as well as friends and neighbors of American Anglicans. Loyalty to the church and to its head could be construed as treason to the American cause. Patriotic American Anglicans, loathing to discard so fundamental a component of their faith as The Book of Common Prayer, revised it to conform to the political realities.

Another result of this was that the first constitution of an independent Anglican Church in the country distanced itself from Rome by calling itself the Protestant Episcopal Church, incorporating in its name the term, Protestant, that Anglicans elsewhere had used, due to reservations about the nature of the Church of England, and other Anglican bodies, vis-à-vis later radical reformers who were happier to use the term Protestant.

=== Massachusetts: church and state debate ===
After independence, the American states were obliged to write constitutions establishing how each would be governed. For three years, from 1778 to 1780, the political energies of Massachusetts were absorbed in drafting a charter of government that the voters would accept.

One of the most contentious issues was whether the state would support the church financially. Advocating such a policy were the ministers and most members of the Congregational Church, which had been established, and hence had received public financial support, during the colonial period. The Baptists, who had grown strong since the Great Awakening, tenaciously adhered to their ancient conviction that churches should receive no support from the state.

The Constitutional Convention chose to support the church and Article Three authorized a general religious tax to be directed to the church of a taxpayers' choice. Despite substantial doubt that Article Three had been approved by the required two thirds of the voters, in 1780 Massachusetts authorities declared it and the rest of the state constitution to have been duly adopted. Such tax laws also took effect in Connecticut and New Hampshire.

In 1788, John Jay urged the New York Legislature to require office-holders to renounce foreign authorities "in all matters ecclesiastical as well as civil".

== 19th century ==
=== Second Great Awakening ===
The Second Great Awakening was a Protestant movement that began around 1790, and gained momentum by 1800. Membership rose rapidly among Baptist and Methodist congregations whose preachers led the movement. It was past its peak by the 1840s. It was a reaction against skepticism, deism, and rational Christianity, and was especially attractive to young women. Millions of new members enrolled in existing evangelical denominations and led to the formation of new denominations. Many converts believed that the Awakening heralded a new millennial age. The Second Great Awakening stimulated the establishment of many reform movements designed to remedy the evils of society before the anticipated Second Coming of Jesus Christ.

While the First Great Awakening was centered on reviving the spirituality of established congregations, the Second focused on the unchurched and sought to instill in them a deep sense of personal salvation as experienced in revival meetings.

The principal innovation produced by the revivals was the camp meeting. When assembled in a field or at the edge of a forest for a prolonged religious meeting, the participants transformed the site into a camp meeting. Singing and preaching was the main activity for several days. The revivals were often intense and created intense emotions. Some fell away but many if not most became permanent church members. The Methodists and Baptists made them one of the evangelical signatures of the denomination.

During the Second Great Awakening new Protestant denominations emerged such as Adventism, the Restoration Movement, and groups such as Jehovah's Witnesses and (although it did not use revivals) Mormonism.

=== Restoration Movement ===
The Restoration Movement (also known as the "Stone-Campbell Movement") generally refers to the "American Restoration Movement," which began on the American frontier during the Second Great Awakening of the early 19th century. The movement sought to reform the church and unite Christians. Barton W. Stone and Alexander Campbell each independently developed similar approaches to the Christian faith, seeking to restore the whole Christian church, on the pattern set forth in the New Testament. Both groups believed that creeds kept Christianity divided. They joined in fellowship in 1832 with a handshake.

They were united, among other things, in the belief that Jesus is the Christ, the Son of God, that churches celebrate the Lord's Supper on the first day of each week, and that baptism of adult believers, by immersion in water, is a necessary condition for Salvation.

The Restoration Movement began as two separate threads, each of which initially developed without the knowledge of the other, during the Second Great Awakening in the early 19th century. The first, led by Barton W. Stone began at Cane Ridge, Bourbon County, Kentucky. The group called themselves simply Christians. The second, began in western Pennsylvania and Virginia (now West Virginia), led by Thomas Campbell and his son, Alexander Campbell. Because the founders wanted to abandon all denominational labels, they used the biblical names for the followers of Jesus that they found in the Bible.Both groups promoted a return to the purposes of the 1st-century churches as described in the New Testament. One historian of the movement has argued that it was primarily a unity movement, with the restoration motif playing a subordinate role.

The Restoration Movement has seen several divisions, resulting in separate groups. Three modern groups claim the Stone Campbell movement as their roots: Churches of Christ, Christian churches and churches of Christ, and the Christian Church (Disciples of Christ). Some see divisions in the movement as the result of the tension between the goals of restoration and ecumenism, with the Churches of Christ and Christian churches and churches of Christ resolving the tension by stressing restoration while the Christian Church (Disciples of Christ) resolved the tension by stressing ecumenism.

=== Latter Day Saints ===
Latter Day Saints follow teachings of Joseph Smith, Jr., and is strongly restorationist in outlook. The movement's history is characterized by intense controversy and persecution in reaction to some of its unique doctrines and practices.

The Latter Day Saint movement traces their origins to the Burned-over district of western New York, where Joseph Smith, Jr., reported seeing God the Father and Jesus Christ, eventually leading him to doctrines that, he said, were lost after the apostles were killed. Joseph Smith gained a small following in the late 1820s as he was dictating the Book of Mormon, which he said was a translation of words found on a set of golden plates that had been buried near his home by an indigenous American prophet. After publishing of the Book of Mormon in 1830, the church rapidly gained a following. It first moved to Kirtland, Ohio, then to Missouri in 1838, where the 1838 Mormon War with other settlers ensued, culminating in adherents being expelled under an "extermination order" signed by the governor of Missouri. Smith built the city of Nauvoo, Illinois, where he was assassinated.

After Smith's death, a succession crisis ensued, and the majority accepted Brigham Young as the church's leader. Young governed his followers as a theocratic leader serving in both political and religious positions. After continued difficulties and persecution in Illinois, Young left Nauvoo in 1846 and led his followers, the Mormon pioneers, to the Great Salt Lake Valley in what is today Utah.

=== Jehovah's Witnesses ===
In 1870, Charles Taze Russell began to study the Bible with a group of Millerist Adventists, including George Storrs and George Stetson, and beginning in 1877 Russell jointly edited a religious journal, Herald of the Morning, with Nelson H. Barbour. In July 1879, after separating from Barbour, Russell began publishing the magazine Zion's Watch Tower and Herald of Christ's Presence, highlighting his interpretations of biblical chronology, with particular attention to his belief that the world was in "the last days". In 1881, Zion's Watch Tower Tract Society was formed in Pittsburgh, Pennsylvania, to disseminate tracts, papers, doctrinal treatises and bibles; three years later, on December 15, 1884, Russell became the president of the Society when it was legally incorporated in Pennsylvania.

Russell's group split into several rival organisations after his death in 1916. One of those groups retained control of Russell's magazine, Zion's Watch Tower and Herald of Christ's Presence, and his legal corporation, the Watch Tower Bible & Tract Society of Pennsylvania, and adopted the name Jehovah's witnesses in 1931. Substantial organizational and doctrinal changes occurred between 1917 and the 1950s. The religion's history has consisted of four distinct phases linked with the successive presidencies of Charles Taze Russell, Joseph Rutherford, Nathan Knorr and Frederick Franz.

=== Separation of church and state ===
In October 1801, members of the Danbury Baptists Associations wrote a letter to the new president-elect Thomas Jefferson. Baptists, being a minority in Connecticut, were still required to pay fees to support the Congregationalist majority. The Baptists found this intolerable. The Baptists, well aware of Jefferson's own unorthodox beliefs, sought him as an ally in making all religious expression a fundamental human right and not a matter of government largesse.

In his January 1, 1802, reply to the Danbury Baptist Association Jefferson summed up the First Amendment's original intent, and used for the first time anywhere a now-familiar phrase in today's political and judicial circles: the amendment established a "wall of separation between church and state". Largely unknown in its day, this phrase has since become a major Constitutional issue. The first time the U.S. Supreme Court cited that phrase from Jefferson was in 1878, 76 years later.

=== African American churches ===
The Christianity of the black population was grounded in evangelicalism. The Second Great Awakening has been called the "central and defining event in the development of Afro-Christianity." During these revivals Baptists and Methodists converted large numbers of African Americans. However, many were disappointed at the treatment they received from their fellow believers and at the backsliding in the commitment to abolish slavery that many white Baptists and Methodists had advocated immediately after the American Revolution.

When their discontent could not be contained, forceful black leaders followed what was becoming an American habit—they formed new denominations. In 1787, Richard Allen and his colleagues in Philadelphia broke away from the Methodist Church and in 1815 founded the African Methodist Episcopal (AME) Church, which, along with independent black Baptist congregations, flourished as the century progressed.

=== Abolitionism ===
The first American movement to abolish slavery came in the spring of 1688 when German and Dutch Quakers of Mennonite descent in Germantown, Pennsylvania, (now part of Philadelphia) wrote a two-page condemnation of the practice and sent it to the governing bodies of their Quaker church, the Society of Friends. Though the Quaker establishment took no immediate action, the 1688 Germantown Quaker Petition Against Slavery was an unusually early, clear, and forceful argument against slavery and initiated the process of banning slavery in the Society of Friends (1776) and Pennsylvania (1780).

The Society for the Relief of Free Negroes Unlawfully Held in Bondage was the first American abolition society, formed 14 April 1775 in Philadelphia, primarily by Quakers who had strong religious objections to slavery.

After the American Revolutionary War, Quaker and Moravian advocates helped persuade numerous slaveholders in the Upper South to free their slaves. Theodore Weld, an evangelical minister, and Robert Purvis, a free African American, joined Garrison in 1833 to form the Anti-Slavery Society (Faragher 381). The following year, Weld encouraged a group of students at Lane Theological Seminary to form an anti-slavery society. After the president, Lyman Beecher, attempted to suppress it, the students moved to Oberlin College. Due to the students' anti-slavery position, Oberlin soon became one of the most liberal colleges and accepted African American students. Along with Garrison, Northcutt and Collins were proponents of immediate abolition. These two ardent abolitionists felt strongly that it could not wait and that immediate action was necessary.

After 1840 "abolition" usually referred to positions like Garrison's; it was largely an ideological movement led by about 3000 people, including free blacks and people of color, many of whom, such as Frederick Douglass, and Robert Purvis and James Forten in Philadelphia, played prominent leadership roles. Abolitionism had a strong religious base, including Quakers and people converted by the revivalist fervor of the Second Great Awakening, led by Charles Finney in the North in the 1830s. Belief in abolition contributed to the breaking away of some small denominations, such as the Free Methodist Church.

Evangelical abolitionists founded some colleges, most notably Bates College in Maine and Oberlin College in Ohio. The well-established colleges, such as Harvard, Yale and Princeton, generally opposed abolition, although the movement did attract such figures as Yale president Noah Porter and Harvard president Thomas Hill.

Daniel O'Connell, the Roman Catholic leader of the Irish in Ireland, supported the abolition of slavery in the British Empire and America. O'Connell had played a leading role in securing Catholic Emancipation (the removal of the civil and political disabilities of Roman Catholics in Great Britain and Ireland), and he was one of William Lloyd Garrison's models. Garrison recruited him to the cause of American abolitionism. O'Connell, the black abolitionist Charles Lenox Remond, and the temperance priest Theobold Mayhew organized a petition with 60,000 signatures urging the Irish of the United States to support abolition. O'Connell also spoke in the United States for abolition.

The Catholic Church in America had long ties in slaveholding Maryland and Louisiana. Despite a firm stand for the spiritual equality of black people, and the resounding condemnation of slavery by Pope Gregory XVI in his bull In supremo apostolatus issued in 1839, the American church continued in deeds, if not in public discourse, to support slaveholding interests. The Bishop of New York denounced O'Connell's petition as a forgery, and if genuine, an unwarranted foreign interference. The Bishop of Charleston declared that, while Catholic tradition opposed slave trading, it had nothing against slavery. No American bishop supported the abolition of slavery before the Civil War. While the war went on, they continued to allow slave-owners to take communion.

One historian observed that ritualist churches separated themselves from heretics rather than sinners; he observed that Episcopalians and Lutherans also accommodated themselves to slavery. (Indeed, one southern Episcopal bishop was a Confederate general.) There were more reasons than religious tradition, however, as the Anglican Church had been the established church in the South during the colonial period. It was linked to the traditions of the landed gentry and the wealthier and educated planter classes, and the Southern traditions, longer than any other church. In addition, while the Protestant missionaries of the Great Awakening initially opposed slavery in the South, by the early decades of the 19th century, Baptist and Methodist preachers in the South had come to an accommodation with it to evangelize farmers and artisans. By the Civil War, the Baptist and Methodist churches split into regional associations because of slavery.

After O'Connell's failure, the American Repeal Associations broke up, but the Garrisonians rarely relapsed into the "bitter hostility" of American Protestants towards the Roman Church. Some antislavery men joined the Know Nothings in the collapse of the parties; but Edmund Quincy ridiculed it as a mushroom growth, a distraction from the real issues. Although the Know-Nothing legislature of Massachusetts honored Garrison, he continued to oppose them as violators of fundamental rights to freedom of worship.

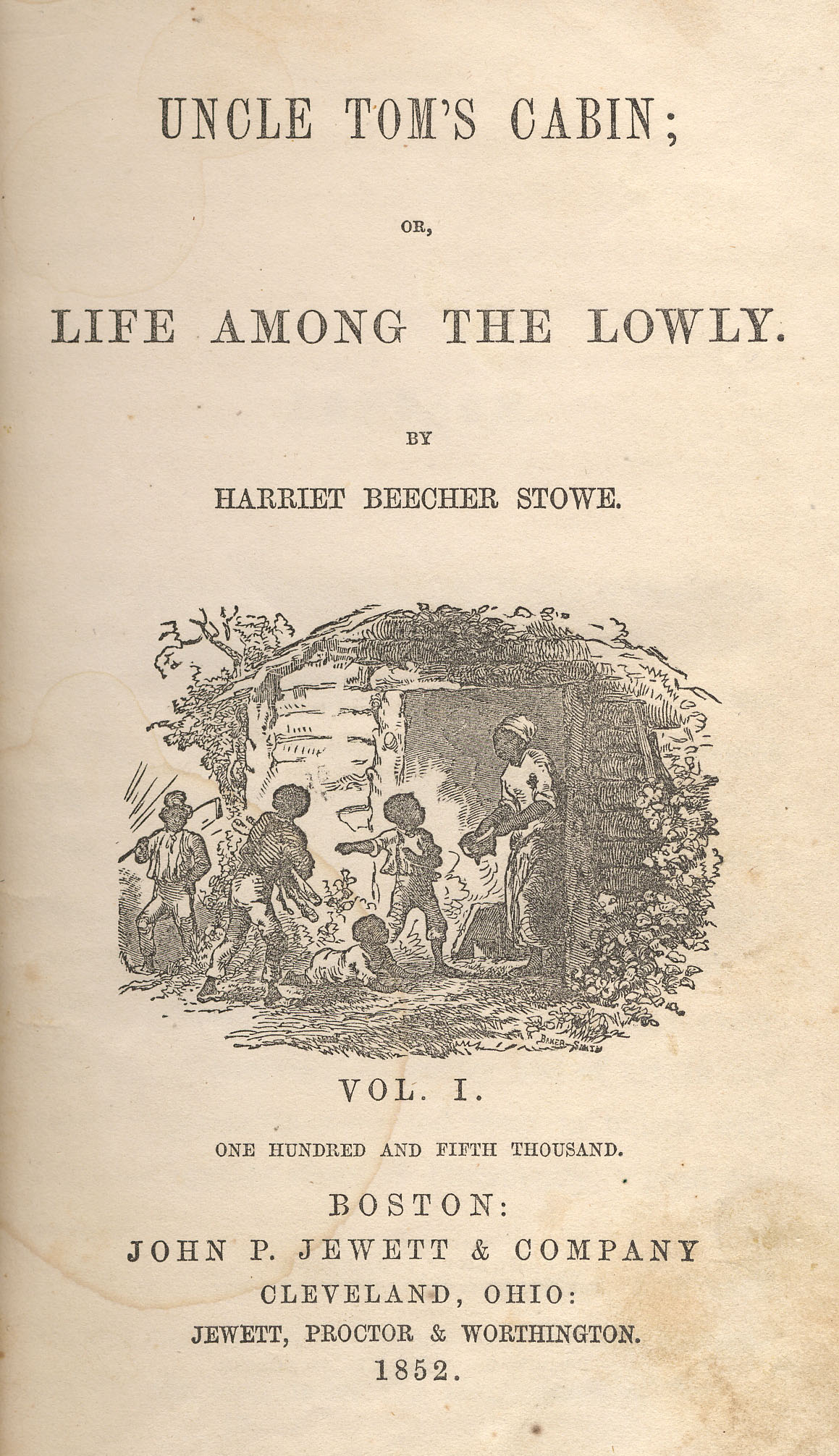
First edition Uncle Tom's Cabin, 1852, USA edition; published simultaneously on both sides of the Atlantic by American author Harriet Beecher Stowe.

The abolitionist movement was strengthened by the activities of free African Americans, especially in the black church, who argued that the old Biblical justifications for slavery contradicted the New Testament. African-American activists and their writings were rarely heard outside the black community; however, they were influential to some sympathetic white people, the first white activist to reach prominence, William Lloyd Garrison, who was its most effective propagandist. Garrison's efforts to recruit eloquent spokesmen led to the discovery of ex-slave Frederick Douglass, who eventually became a prominent activist in his own right.

=== Russian Orthodoxy ===
The headquarters of this North American Diocese of the Russian Orthodox Church was moved from Alaska to California around the mid-19th century. It was moved again in the last part of the same century, this time to New York. This transfer coincided with a great movement of Uniates to the Orthodox Church in the eastern United States. This movement, which increased the numbers of Orthodox Christians in America, resulted from a conflict between John Ireland, the politically powerful Roman Catholic Archbishop of Saint Paul, Minnesota, and Alexis Toth, an influential Ruthenian Catholic priest. Archbishop Ireland's refusal to accept Fr. Toth's credentials as a priest induced Fr. Toth to return to the Orthodox Church of his ancestors, and further resulted in the return of tens of thousands of other Uniate Catholics in North America to the Orthodox Church, under his guidance and inspiration.

For this reason, Ireland is sometimes ironically remembered as the "Father of the Orthodox Church in America." These Uniates were received into Orthodoxy into the existing North American diocese of the Russian Orthodox Church. At the same time large numbers of Greeks and other Orthodox Christians were also immigrating to America. At this time all Orthodox Christians in North America were united under the omophorion (Church authority and protection) of the Patriarch of Moscow, through the Russian Church's North American diocese. The unity was not merely theoretical but was a reality, since there was then no other diocese on the continent. Under the aegis of this diocese, which at the turn of the 20th century was ruled by Bishop (and future Patriarch) Tikhon, Orthodox Christians of various ethnic backgrounds were ministered to, both non-Russian and Russian; a Syro-Arab mission was established in the episcopal leadership of Saint Raphael of Brooklyn, who was the first Orthodox bishop to be consecrated in America.

=== Liberal Christianity ===
The "secularization of society" is attributed to the time of the Enlightenment. In the United States, religious observance is much higher than in Europe, and the United States' culture leans conservative in comparison to other western nations, in part due to the Christian element.

Liberal Christianity, exemplified by some theologians, sought to bring to churches new critical approaches to the Bible. Sometimes called liberal theology, liberal Christianity is an umbrella term covering movements and ideas within 19th and 20th century Christianity. New attitudes became evident, and the practice of questioning the nearly universally accepted Christian orthodoxy began to come to the forefront.

In the post–World War I era, Liberalism was the faster-growing sector of the American church. Liberal wings of denominations were on the rise, and a considerable number of seminaries held and taught from a liberal perspective as well. In the post–World War II era, the trend began to swing back towards the conservative camp in America's seminaries and church structures.

=== Fundamentalism ===
Christian fundamentalism began as a movement in the late 19th and early 20th centuries to reject influences of secular humanism and source criticism in modern Christianity. In reaction to liberal Protestant groups that denied doctrines considered fundamental to these conservative groups, they sought to establish tenets necessary to maintaining a Christian identity, the "fundamentals", hence the term fundamentalist.

Especially targeting critical approaches to the interpretation of the Bible, and trying to blockade the inroads made into their churches by secular scientific assumptions, the fundamentalists grew in various denominations as independent movements of resistance to the drift away from historic Christianity.

Over time, the movement divided, with the label Fundamentalist being retained by the smaller and more hard line groups. Evangelical has become the main identifier of the groups holding to the movement's moderate and earliest ideas.

=== Roman Catholicism ===
By 1850 Roman Catholics had become the country's largest single denomination. Between 1860 and 1890 the population of Roman Catholics in the United States tripled through immigration; by the end of the decade it would reach seven million. These immigrant Catholics came from Ireland, Southern Germany, Italy, Poland and Eastern Europe. The influx would eventually bring increased political power for the Roman Catholic Church and a greater cultural presence, which led to a growing fear of the Catholic "menace". As the 19th century wore on, animosity waned; Protestant Americans realized that Roman Catholics were not trying to seize control of the government. Nonetheless, fears continued into the 20th century that there was too much "Catholic influence" on the government.

=== Anti-Catholicism ===
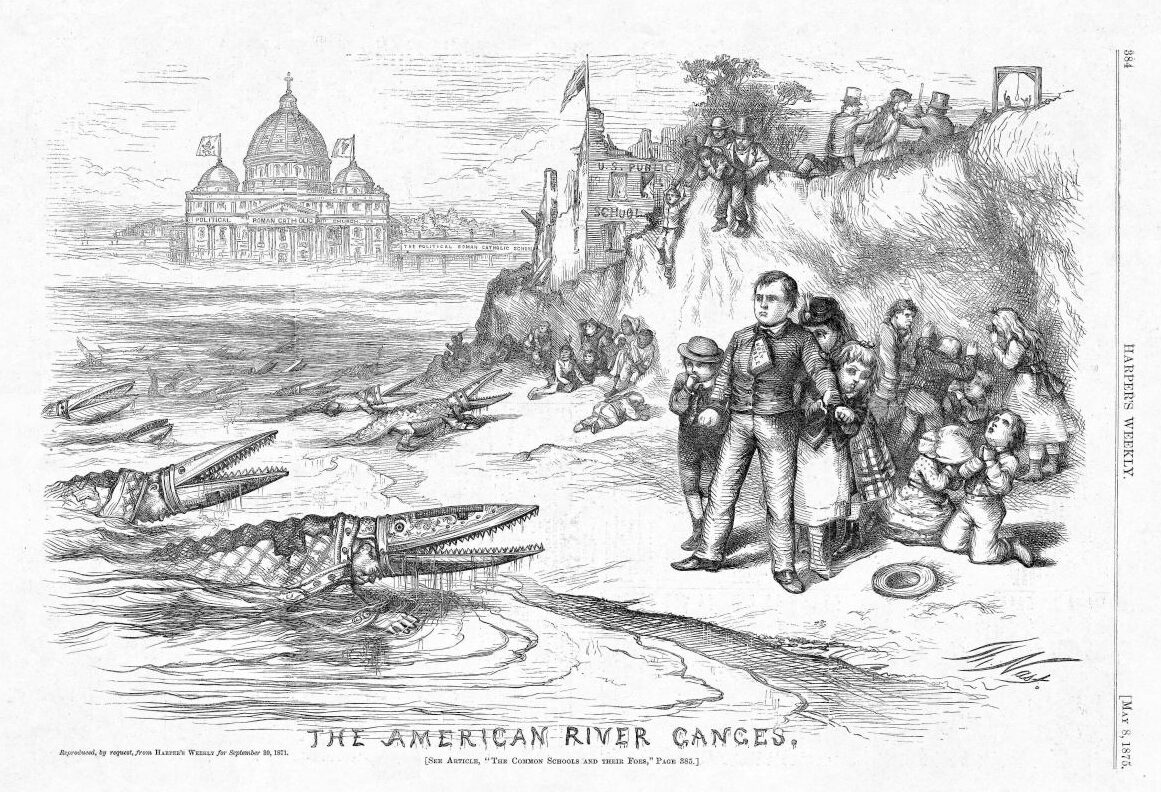
1876 editorial cartoon by Thomas Nast showing bishops as crocodiles attacking public schools, with the connivance of Irish Catholic politicians

Anti-Catholic animus in the United States reached a peak in the 19th century when the Protestant population became alarmed by the influx of Catholic immigrants. Fearing the end of times, some American Protestants who believed they were God's chosen people, went so far as to claim that the Catholic Church was the Whore of Babylon in the Book of Revelation.

The resulting "nativist" movement, which achieved prominence in the 1840s, was whipped into a frenzy of anti-Catholicism that led to mob violence, the burning of Catholic property, and the killing of Catholics.

This violence was fed by claims that Catholics were destroying the culture of the United States. Irish Catholic immigrants were blamed for raising the taxes of the country as well as for spreading violence and disease.

The nativist movement found expression in a national political movement called the Know-Nothing Party of the 1850s, which (unsuccessfully) ran former president Millard Fillmore as its presidential candidate in 1856.

The Catholic parochial school system developed in the early-to-mid-19th century partly in response to what was seen as anti-Catholic bias in American public schools. The recent wave of newly established Protestant schools is sometimes similarly attributed to the teaching of evolution (as opposed to creationism) in public schools.

Most states passed a constitutional amendment, called "Blaine Amendments, forbidding tax money be used to fund parochial schools, which might have followed the heavy immigration from Catholic Ireland after the 1840s. In 2002, the United States Supreme Court partially vitiated these amendments, in theory, when they ruled that vouchers were constitutional if tax dollars followed a child to a school, even if it were religious. However, no state school system had, by 2009, changed its laws to allow this.

=== Labor union movement ===
The Catholic Church exercised a prominent role in shaping America's labor movement. From the onset of significant immigration in the 1840s, the Church in the United States was predominantly urban, with both its leaders and congregants usually of the laboring classes. Over the course of the second half of the 19th century, nativism, anti-Catholicism, and anti-unionism coalesced in Republican politics, and Catholics gravitated toward unions and the Democratic Party.

The Knights of Labor was the earliest labor organization in the United States. In the 1880s it was the largest labor union in the United States and it is estimated that at least half its membership was Catholic (including Terence Powderly, its president from 1881 onward).

In Rerum novarum (1891), Pope Leo XIII criticized the concentration of wealth and power, spoke out against the abuses that workers faced, and demanded that workers should be granted certain rights and safety regulations. He upheld the right of voluntary association, specifically commending labor unions. At the same time, he reiterated the Church's defense of private property, condemned socialism, and emphasized the need for Catholics to form and join unions that were not compromised by secular and revolutionary ideologies.

Rerum novarum provided new impetus for Catholics to become active in the labor movement, even if its exhortation to form specifically Catholic labor unions was widely interpreted as irrelevant to the pluralist context of the United States. While atheism underpinned many European unions and stimulated Catholic unionists to form separate labor federations, the religious neutrality of unions in the U.S. provided no such impetus. American Catholics seldom dominated unions, but they exerted influence across organized labor. Catholic union members and leaders played important roles in steering American unions away from socialism.

=== Youth programs ===
While children and youth in the colonial era were treated as small adults, awareness of their special status and needs grew in the nineteenth century, denominations large and small began special programs for their young people. Protestant theologian Horace Bushnell in Christian Nurture (1847) emphasized the necessity of identifying and supporting the religiosity of children and young adults. Beginning in the 1790s the Protestant denominations set up Sunday school programs. They provided a major source of new members. Urban Protestant churchmen set up the interdenominational YMCA (and later the YWCA) programs in cities from the 1850s. Methodists looked on their youth as potential political activists, providing them with opportunities to engage in social justice movements such as prohibition. Black Protestants, especially after they could form their own separate churches, integrated their young people directly into the larger religious community. Their youth played a major role in the leadership of the Civil Rights Movement of the 1950s and the 1960s. White evangelicals in the twentieth century set up Bible clubs for teenagers, and experimented with the use of music to attract young people. The Catholics started a network of parochial schools, and by the late nineteenth century probably more than half of their young members were attending elementary schools run by local parishes. Some Missouri Synod German Lutherans and Dutch Reformed churches also started parochial schools. In the twentieth century, all the denominations sponsored programs such as the Boy Scouts and Girl Scouts.

== 20th century ==
=== Social Gospel ===
The Social Gospel flourished from the 1890s to the 1920s by calling for the application of Christian ethics to social problems, especially to issues of social justice such as economic inequality, poverty, alcoholism, crime, racial tensions, slums, bad hygiene, child labor, inadequate labor unions, poor schools, and the danger of war. Theologically, the Social Gospel sought to operationalize the Lord's Prayer (Matthew 6:10): "Thy kingdom come, Thy will be done on earth as it is in heaven." They typically were postmillennialist; that is, they believed the Second Coming of Christ could not happen until humankind rid itself of social evils with human effort. The Social Gospel was more popular among clergy than laity. Its leaders were predominantly associated with the liberal wing of the Progressive Movement and most were theologically liberal, although they were typically conservative when it came to their views on social issues. Important leaders include Richard T. Ely, Josiah Strong, Washington Gladden, and Walter Rauschenbusch.

The Social Gospel movement peaked in the early 20th century. Some scholars argue that the horrors caused by World War I left many disillusioned with the Social Gospel's ideals and promise of a glorious future for mankind. while others argue that World War I actually stimulated the Social Gospelers' reform efforts. Theories regarding the decline of the Social Gospel after World War I often cite the rise of neoorthodoxy as a contributing factor in the movement's decline. Many of the Social Gospel's ideas reappeared in the Civil Rights Movement of the 1960s. "Social Gospel" principles continue to inspire newer movements such as Christians Against Poverty.

=== Scopes Monkey Trial ===
The Scopes Monkey Trial was a major publicity event in 1925 that saw a modernist challenge to Fundamentalist beliefs about the Bible. Technically it was a criminal case that used Tennessee's Butler Act which made it unlawful in any public school "to teach any theory that denies the story of the Divine Creation of man as taught in the Bible, and to teach instead that man has descended from a lower order of animals." This is often interpreted as meaning that the law forbade the teaching of any aspect of the theory of evolution. The case was a critical turning point in the United States' creation-evolution controversy.

After the passage of the Butler Act, the American Civil Liberties Union financed a test case where a Dayton, Tennessee high school teacher named John Scopes intentionally violated the Act. The highly publicized trial pitted two of the pre-eminent lawyers of the time against one another; three-time Democratic presidential candidate William Jennings Bryan headed up the prosecution and famous defense attorney Clarence Darrow spoke for Scopes. Scopes was convicted but the charges were dropped on a technicality. The result was a setback for years in the Fundamentalist effort to halt the teaching of evolution.

=== Evangelicalism ===
In the U.S. and elsewhere in the world, there has been a marked rise in the evangelical wing of Protestant denominations, especially those that were more exclusively evangelical, and a corresponding decline in the mainstream liberal churches.

The 1950s saw a boom in the Evangelical church in America. The post–World War II prosperity experienced in the U.S. also had its effects on the church. Church buildings were erected in large numbers, and the Evangelical church's activities grew along with this expansive physical growth. In the southern U.S., the Evangelicals, represented by leaders such as Billy Graham, experienced a notable surge displacing the caricature of the pulpit-pounding country preachers of fundamentalism. The stereotypes gradually shifted.

Evangelicals are as diverse as the names that appear: Billy Graham, Chuck Colson, J. Vernon McGee, or Jimmy Carter—or even Evangelical institutions such as Gordon-Conwell Theological Seminary (Boston) or Trinity Evangelical Divinity School (Chicago). Although there exists a diversity in the Evangelical community worldwide, the ties that bind all Evangelicals include: a "high view" of Scripture, belief in the deity of Christ, the Trinity, salvation by grace through faith, and the bodily resurrection of Christ, and others.

=== Pentecostalism ===
Pentecostalism arose and developed in 20th-century Christianity. The Pentecostal movement had its roots in the Pietism and the Holiness movement, and arose out of the meetings in 1906 at an urban mission on Azusa Street Revival in Los Angeles, California

The Azusa Street Revival was led by William J. Seymour, an African American preacher, and began with a meeting on April 14, 1906, at the African Methodist Episcopal Church and continued until about 1915. The revival was characterized by ecstatic spiritual experiences accompanied by speaking in tongues, dramatic worship services, and inter-racial mingling. It was the primary catalyst for the rise of Pentecostalism spread by those who experienced what they believed to be miraculous interventions of God.

Many Pentecostals embrace the term "Evangelical", while others prefer "Restorationist". Within classical Pentecostalism there are three major orientations: Wesleyan-Holiness, Higher Life, and Oneness.

Pentecostalism would later birth the Charismatic movement within already established denominations; some Pentecostals use the two terms interchangeably. Pentecostalism claims more than 250 million adherents worldwide. When Charismatics are added with Pentecostals the number nearly doubles to a quarter of the world's 2 billion Christians.

=== Roman Catholicism ===
By the beginning of the 20th century, approximately one-sixth of the population of the United States was Roman Catholic. Modern Roman Catholic immigrants come to the United States from the Philippines, Poland, and Latin America, especially from Mexico. This multiculturalism and diversity impacted Catholicism in the United States. For example, many dioceses have Mass in both Spanish and English.

=== Eastern Orthodoxy ===
Emigration from Greece and the Near East in the last hundred years has increased the Orthodox diaspora in the United States and elsewhere. Virtually all the Orthodox nationalities—Greek, Arab, Russian, Serbian, Albanian, Ukrainian, Romanian, Bulgarian—are represented in the United States.

Many of the Orthodox church movements in the West are fragmented under jurisdictionalism. This is where the groups are divided by ethnicity as the unifying character to each movement. As the older ethnic laity die off, more of the churches are opening to new converts. Early on these converts would have faced a daunting task in having to learn the language and culture of the respective Orthodox group in order to properly convert to Orthodoxy. Now many of the churches perform their services in English or Spanish or Portuguese (depending on the Metropolitan or district).

==== Russian Orthodoxy ====
In 1920 Patriarch Tikhon issued an ukase (decree) that dioceses of the Church of Russia that were cut off from the governance of the highest Church authority (i.e. the Holy Synod and the Patriarch) should be managed independently until such time as normal relations with the highest Church authority could be resumed. On this basis, the North American diocese of the Russian Orthodox Church (known as the "Metropolia") continued to exist in a de facto autonomous mode of self-governance. The financial hardship that beset the North American diocese as the result of the Russian Revolution resulted in a degree of administrative chaos, with the result that other national Orthodox communities in North America turned to the churches in their respective homelands for pastoral care and governance.

A group of bishops who had left Russia in the wake of the Russian Civil War gathered in Sremski-Karlovci, Yugoslavia, and adopted a pro-monarchist stand. The group further claimed to speak as a synod for the entire "free" Russian church. This group, which to this day includes a sizable portion of the Russian emigration, was formally dissolved in 1922 by Patriarch Tikhon, who then appointed metropolitans Platon and Evlogy as ruling bishops in America and Europe, respectively. Both metropolitans continued to entertain relations intermittently with the synod in Karlovci.

Between the World Wars the Metropolia coexisted and at times cooperated with an independent synod later known as Russian Orthodox Church Outside Russia (ROCOR), sometimes also called the Russian Orthodox Church Abroad. The two groups eventually went separate ways. ROCOR, which moved its headquarters to North America after the Second World War, claimed but failed to establish jurisdiction over all parishes of Russian origin in North America. The Metropolia, as a former diocese of the Russian Church, looked to the latter as its highest church authority, albeit one from which it was temporarily cut off under the conditions of the communist regime in Russia.

After World War II the Patriarchate of Moscow made unsuccessful attempts to regain control over these groups. After resuming communication with Moscow in the early 1960s, and being granted autocephaly in 1970, the Metropolia became known as the Orthodox Church in America. However, recognition of this autocephalous status is not universal, as the Ecumenical Patriarch (under whom is the Greek Orthodox Archdiocese of America) and some other jurisdictions have not accepted it. Nevertheless, the Ecumenical Patriarch, the Patriarch of Moscow, and the other jurisdictions are in communion, with a warming of relations between the OCA and ROCOR. The Patriarchate of Moscow thereby renounced its former canonical claims in the United States and Canada.

=== National associations ===
The Federal Council of Churches, founded in 1908, marked the first major expression of a growing modern ecumenical movement among Christians in the United States. It was active in pressing for reform of public and private policies, particularly as they impacted the lives of those living in poverty, and developed a comprehensive and widely debated Social Creed which served as a humanitarian "bill of rights" for those seeking improvements in American life.

In 1950, the National Council of the Churches of Christ in the USA (usually identified as National Council of Churches, or NCC) represented a substantial expansion in the development of ecumenical cooperation. It was a merger of the Federal Council of Churches, the International Council of Religious Education, and several other interchurch ministries. In 2012, the NCC is a joint venture of 35 Christian denominations in the United States with 100,000 local congregations and 40,000,000 adherents. Its member communions include Mainline Protestant, Orthodox, African-American, Evangelical and historic Peace churches. The NCC took a prominent role in the Civil Rights Movement, and fostered the publication of the widely used Revised Standard Version of the Bible, followed by an updated and sex-neutral New Revised Standard Version, the first translation to benefit from the discovery of the Dead Sea Scrolls. The organization is headquartered in Washington, DC. The NCC is related fraternally to hundreds of local and regional councils of churches, to other national councils across the globe, and to the World Council of Churches. All of these bodies are independently governed.

Carl McIntire led in organizing the American Council of Christian Churches (ACCC), now with 7 member bodies, in September 1941. It was a more militant and fundamentalist organization set up in opposition to what became the National Council of Churches. The organization is headquartered in Bethlehem, Pennsylvania. The ACCC is related fraternally to the International Council of Christian Churches. McIntire invited the Evangelicals for United Action to join with them, but those who met in St. Louis declined the offer.

A national conference for United Action Among Evangelicals was called to meet in April 1942. The National Association of Evangelicals was formed by a group of 147 people who met in St. Louis, Missouri, on April 7–9, 1942. The organization was called the National Association of Evangelicals for United Action, soon shortened to the National Association of Evangelicals (NEA). There are currently 60 denominations with about 45,000 churches in the organization. The organization is headquartered in Washington, D.C. The NEA is related fraternally to the World Evangelical Fellowship.

=== Oregon Compulsory Education Act ===
After World War I, some states concerned about the influence of immigrants and "foreign" values looked to public schools for help. The states drafted laws designed to use schools to promote a common American culture.

In 1922, the Masonic Grand Lodge of Oregon sponsored a bill to require all school-age children to attend public schools. With support of the Ku Klux Klan and Democratic Governor Walter M. Pierce, endorsed by the Klan, the Compulsory Education Act was passed by a vote of 115,506 to 103,685. Its primary purpose was to shut down Catholic schools in Oregon, but it also affected other private and military schools. The constitutionality of the law was challenged in court and ultimately struck down by the Supreme Court in Pierce v. Society of Sisters (1925) before it went into effect.

The law caused outraged Catholics to organize locally and nationally for the right to send their children to Catholic schools. In Pierce v. Society of Sisters (1925), the United States Supreme Court declared the Oregon's Compulsory Education Act unconstitutional in a ruling that has been called "the Magna Carta of the parochial school system."

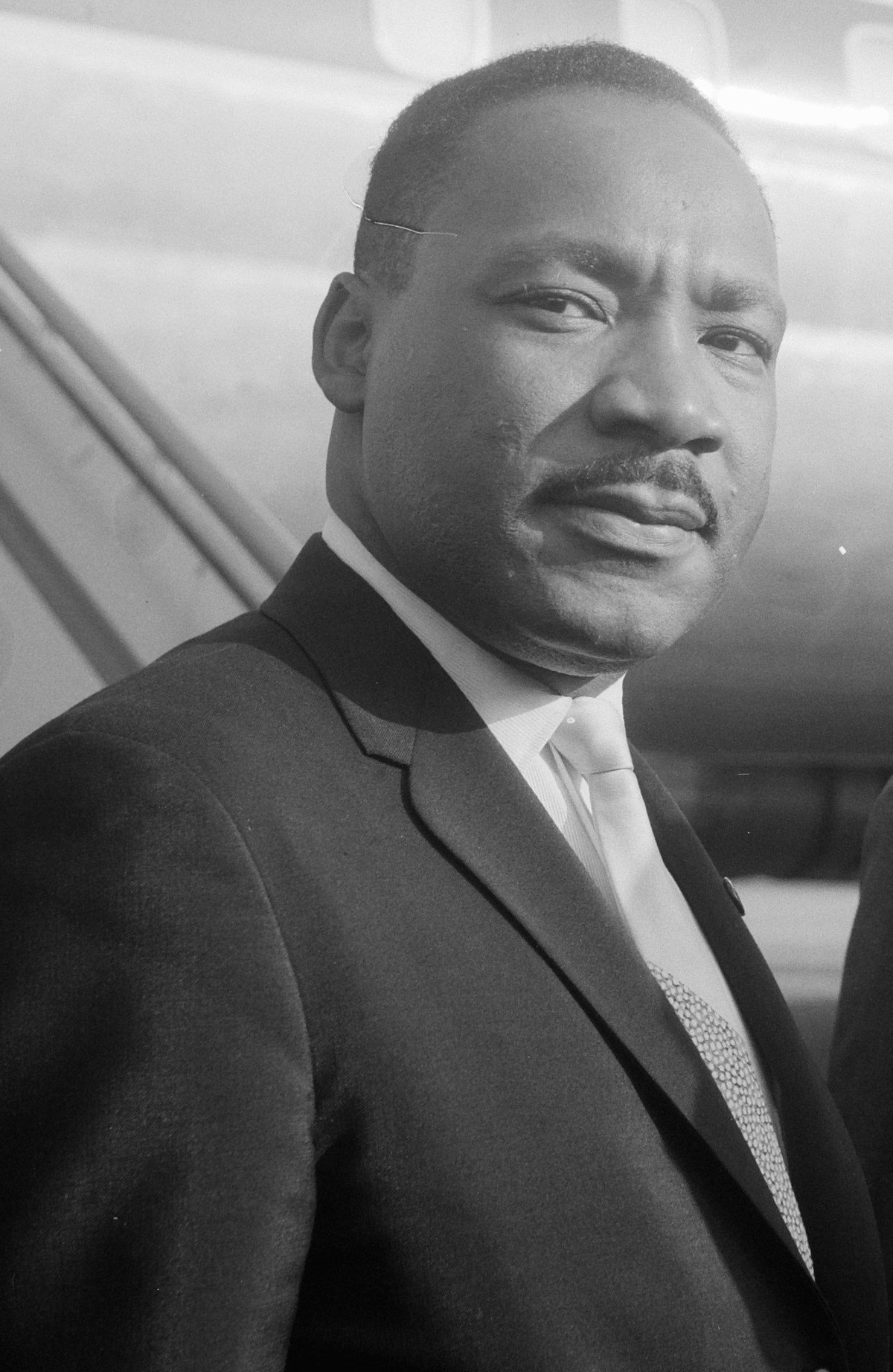
Martin Luther King Jr., in 1964

=== Civil Rights Movement ===
As the center of community life, African-American churches held a leadership role in the Civil Rights Movement. Their history as a focal point for the Black community and as a link between the Black and White worlds made them natural for this purpose.

Rev. Martin Luther King Jr. was one of many notable Black ministers involved in the movement. He helped found the Southern Christian Leadership Conference (1957), serving as its first president. In 1964, King received the Nobel Peace Prize for his efforts to end segregation and racial discrimination through non-violent civil disobedience. King was assassinated in 1968.

Ralph Abernathy, Bernard Lee, Fred Shuttlesworth, C.T. Vivian and Jesse Jackson are among the many notable minister-activists. They were especially important during the later years of the movement in the 1950s and 1960s.

== See also ==
- Catholic social activism in the United States
- Christianity in the United States
- History of religion in the United States
- History of Roman Catholicism in the United States
- Religion in the United States
