= Jonas Wendell =

American Christian evangelist (1815–1873)

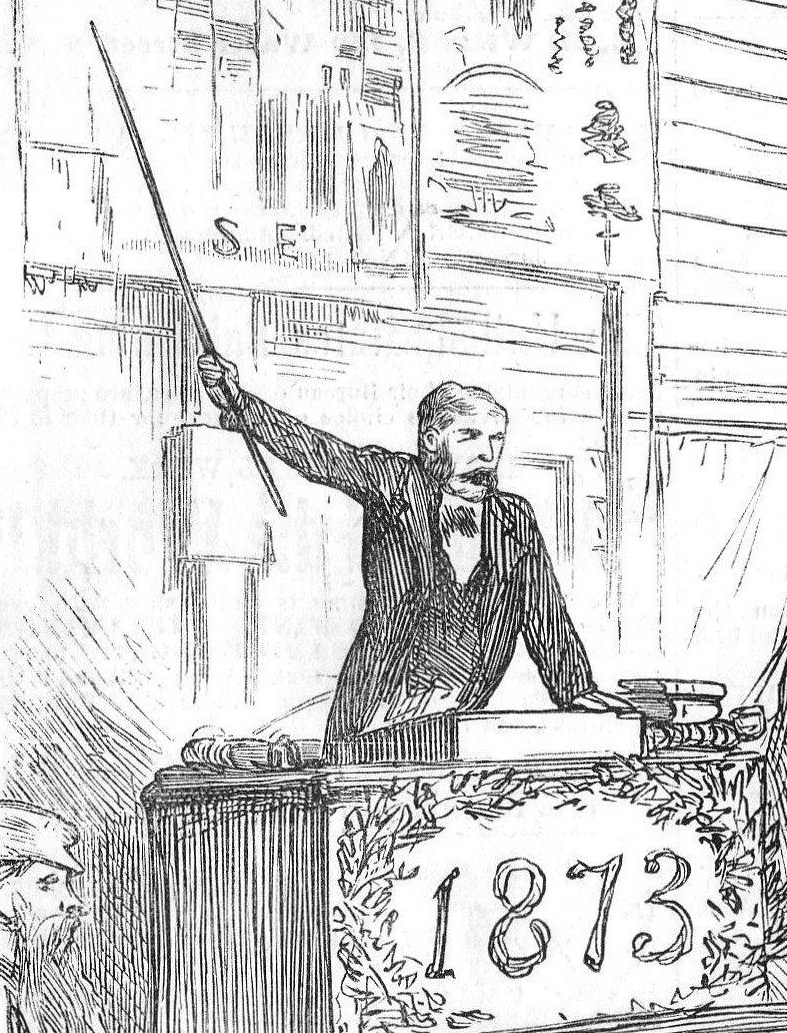
- Born: December 25, 1815; Edinboro, Pennsylvania, U.S.
- Died: August 14, 1873 (aged 57)
- Occupation: Preacher

Elder Jonas Wendell (December 25, 1815 – August 14, 1873) of Edinboro, Pennsylvania, was a zealous Adventist preacher following in the spirit of William Miller. Following the "Great Disappointment" Wendell experienced periods of weak faith, as did many Adventists. He eventually recovered his faith after renewing his study of Bible chronology (historic and prophetic) and began to preach extensively throughout Ohio, Pennsylvania, the Virginias, and New England. By the late 1860s he had been studying the chronology of the Bible, and was encouraged by conclusions showing Christ's return would occur in either 1868 or 1873/4. In 1870 Wendell published his views in the booklet entitled The Present Truth, or Meat in Due Season concluding that the Second Advent was sure to occur in 1873.

Unknown to him, attendance at one of his presentations restored Charles Taze Russell's faith in the Bible as the true word of God, leading to Russell's ministry.

== Coverage of disputed charges ==
In 1871, the Associated Press circulated a story that Wendell had been arrested in Pennsylvania on the charge of "improper intimacy" with a 16-year-old girl. No evidence of impropriety was ever produced, and Wendell publicly denied not only the charges, but that he had ever been arrested.

== Obituary ==
The magazine The World's Crisis in the September 10, 1873 issue offered an obituary written by fellow Adventist and personal friend, George Stetson. A brief summary appears below:

In Memory of Elder Jonas Wendell

"He was born December 25, 1815, and fell asleep August 14 1873. Age fifty seven years, seven months, and fourteen days. ...

"He had settled on 1873 as the year in which "the hope of seeing Jesus and being made like him" should be realized by a waiting and expectant church, and set forth the reasons for his hope in a little work entitled, "Present truth," or "Meat in Due Season," ...

"... on Wednesday evening, 13 August, by request, in absence of the pastor, he led the prayer and conference meeting, and much edified all present by his unusual fervency in prayer, exhortation, and singing. "What a friend we have in Jesus" was the last hymn he ever sung with us. On Thursday the 14th, he went to the Sabbath School picnic in most excellent spirits, and seemed to be very happy in the Lord. When time for adjournment arrived, he got out his horse to return home, but seeing a lad in trouble from a sickly horse, he went to his assistance, where he overtaxed his physical strength, and returned to his own buggy quite exhausted. But he got in and took the lines from his niece, to start home, but immediately loosened his hold, dropped them, and fell over backward in his seat, dead. He gave but two slight gasps for breath, and all was over...

"On Saturday, 16 August, at 2 P.M. his funeral was numerously attended at our chapel, when all the clergy of our village came to observe his obsequies, sympathize with his bereaved family, and participate in the services of the occasion... Medical opinion is divided between apoplexy and heart disease as cause of death.

== Works ==
- The Present Truth or Meat in Due Season, 1870
