= George Fox University =

Christian university in Newberg, Oregon, US

- Former names: Friends Pacific Academy (1885–1891); Pacific College (1891–1949); George Fox College (1949–1996); Western Evangelical Seminary (1947–1996)
- Motto: Christianity and Culture
- Type: Private university
- Established: 1891; 135 years ago
- Religious affiliation: Evangelical Friends Church International (Northwest United States Yearly Meeting); Wesleyan Holiness Connection
- Academic affiliations: Council for Christian Colleges and Universities, Christian College Consortium, Space-grant
- Endowment: $32.2 million (2021)
- President: Robin E. Baker
- Faculty: 196 (full time)
- Undergraduates: 2,488
- Postgraduates: 1,561
- Other students: 290 degree completion
- Location: Newberg, Oregon, U.S. 45.3036°N 122.9683°W
- Campus: Suburban, 108 acres (44 ha)
- Colors: Old gold and navy blue
- Nickname: Bruins
- Sporting affiliations: NCAA Division III – Northwest Conference
- Website: georgefox.edu
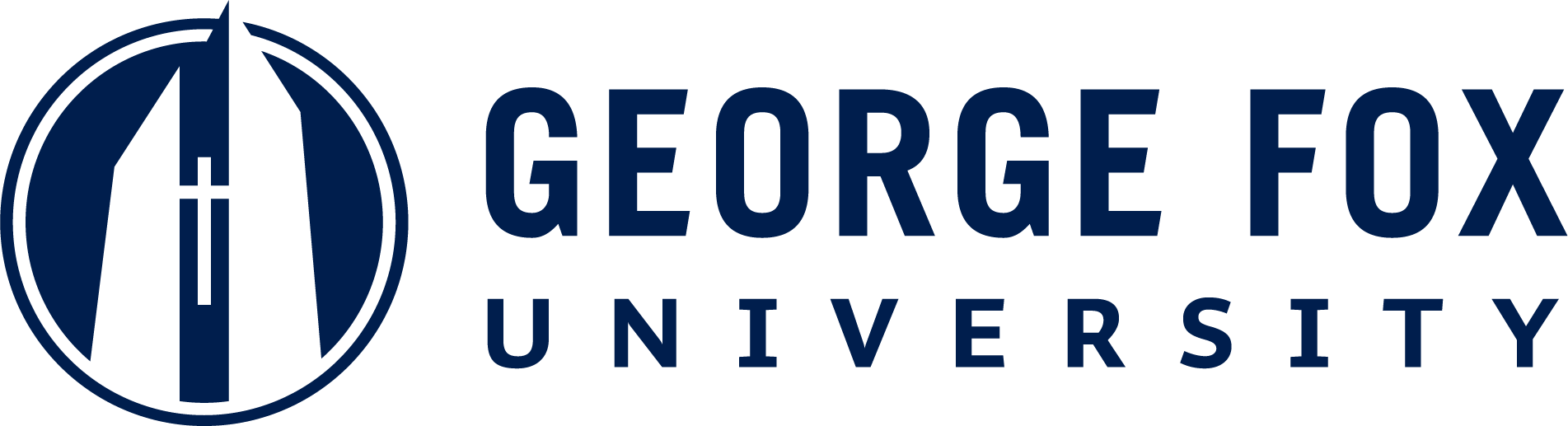

George Fox University is a private Christian university in Newberg, Oregon, United States. Founded in 1891 as a school for Quakers, as of 2026, it is now the largest private university in Oregon with more than 4,000 students combined between its main campus in Newberg, its centers in Portland and Redmond, and online. The 108-acre (44 ha) main campus is near downtown Newberg, near the junction of Oregon Route 99W and Oregon Route 219. George Fox competes athletically at the NCAA Division III level in the Northwest Conference as the Bruins. The school colors are navy blue and old gold. The university is associated with the Evangelical Friends Church International and is a member of the Wesleyan Holiness Connection.

== History ==
The university was founded in Newberg, Oregon, in 1885 by Quaker pioneers, originally called Friends Pacific Academy for several years before becoming a college in 1891 as Pacific College.

The "Bruin" mascot is named after a real bear cub found in 1887 in the Coast Range's foothills near Carlton, about 15 miles (24 km) west of Newberg. The cub's mother had been shot and it was brought to the school by a student. The bear, Bruin, was adopted by the faculty and cared for until his death, after which he was taxidermied and kept in the campus museum. In the late 1890s, the bear's hide was stolen from the museum and became the senior class's unofficial mascot. Other students often attempted to steal it away, and over time the fight to capture the bear became an annual tradition. Students today still participate in student-government-sponsored class competitions called "Bruin brawls" for possession of "Bruin Jr.", the real taxidermied bear having been swapped out for a stuffed canvas fascimile bear in the 1930s. Bruin the bear became the school's official mascot in 1970.

In 1893 the school was incorporated as a joint-stock company, and it became a four-year school in 1925. Herbert Hoover's uncle H. J. Minthorn served as the school's first president, and Hoover himself was an early student at the academy (although he dropped out in 1888 at the age of 13 to work in his uncle's real estate office). The school's name changed to George Fox College in 1949 to honor George Fox, the founder of the Quaker movement.

In 1996, the college merged with Western Evangelical Seminary to form George Fox University. Associate professor of biology Dwight Kimberly received the Carnegie Foundation's Oregon Professor of the Year award in 2000. Associate professor of theatre Rhett Luedtke was one of three faculty members nationally to receive a National Directing Fellow Award from the John F. Kennedy Center in 2010.

The student body has grown more than 500% since 1986, when enrollment was 549. With 4,339 students in Newberg, Portland, and other Oregon teaching sites, George Fox is now the state's largest private university.

In 2014, prompted by a housing dispute involving a transgender student, George Fox University sought and received a limited exemption from Title IX's requirements on religious grounds. A 2021 legal challenge to such exemptions, against the U.S. Department of Education, was dismissed in 2023.

In 2015, the school completed a new residence hall, Brandt Hall, named for former school president David H. Brandt and his wife, Melva. A new dining hall, Canyon Commons, opened in the fall of 2016. The university's first dedicated chapel was dedicated in 2024.

== Academics ==
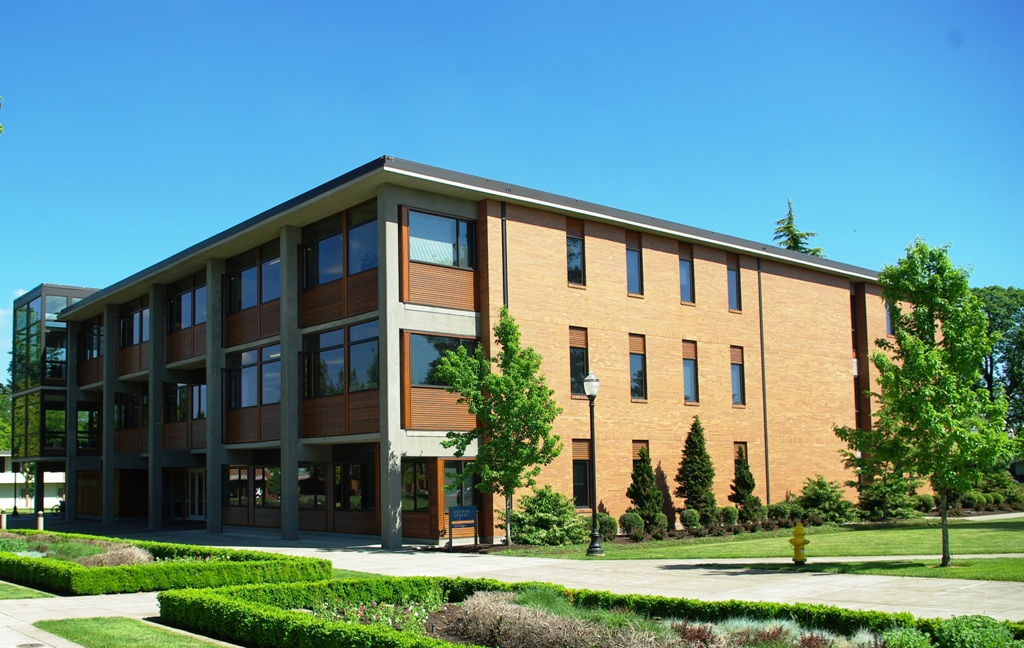
The Stevens Center on the Newberg campus

George Fox grants degrees at each of the traditional levels of university education, baccalaureate, master's degrees, and doctorates. The university participates in the Richter Scholars program, which sponsors 15 to 25 students each year in encouragement of original research. The university also offers study-abroad opportunities through the "Best Semester" program offered by the Council for Christian Colleges and Universities (CCCU).

== Athletics ==
George Fox Athletics logo

The George Fox athletic teams are called the Bruins. The university is a member of the Division III level of the National Collegiate Athletic Association (NCAA), primarily competing in the Northwest Conference (NWC) since the 1995–96 academic year. In 2021–22 and 2022–23, George Fox won the Northwest Conference McIlroy-Lewis All-Sports Trophy for best all-around finishes in both seasons. The Bruins previously competed in the Cascade Collegiate Conference (CCC) of the National Association of Intercollegiate Athletics (NAIA) from 1993–94 to 1994–95. They had competed in the NAIA from 1965 before switching affiliation into the NCAA in 1998.

George Fox competes in 24 intercollegiate varsity sports: Men's sports include baseball, basketball, cross country, eSports, football, golf, soccer, swimming, tennis and track & field (indoor and outdoor) for men. Women compete in basketball, cross country, eSports, flag football, golf, lacrosse, soccer, softball, stunt, swimming, tennis, track & field (indoor and outdoor), and volleyball.

=== Accomplishments ===
The Bruins have won four team NCAA DIII national championships. In 2004, the baseball team won the NCAA Division III national championship, a game recognized as one of the top 50 moments in Northwest Sports History by Portland radio station KFXX AM 1080, "The Fan."

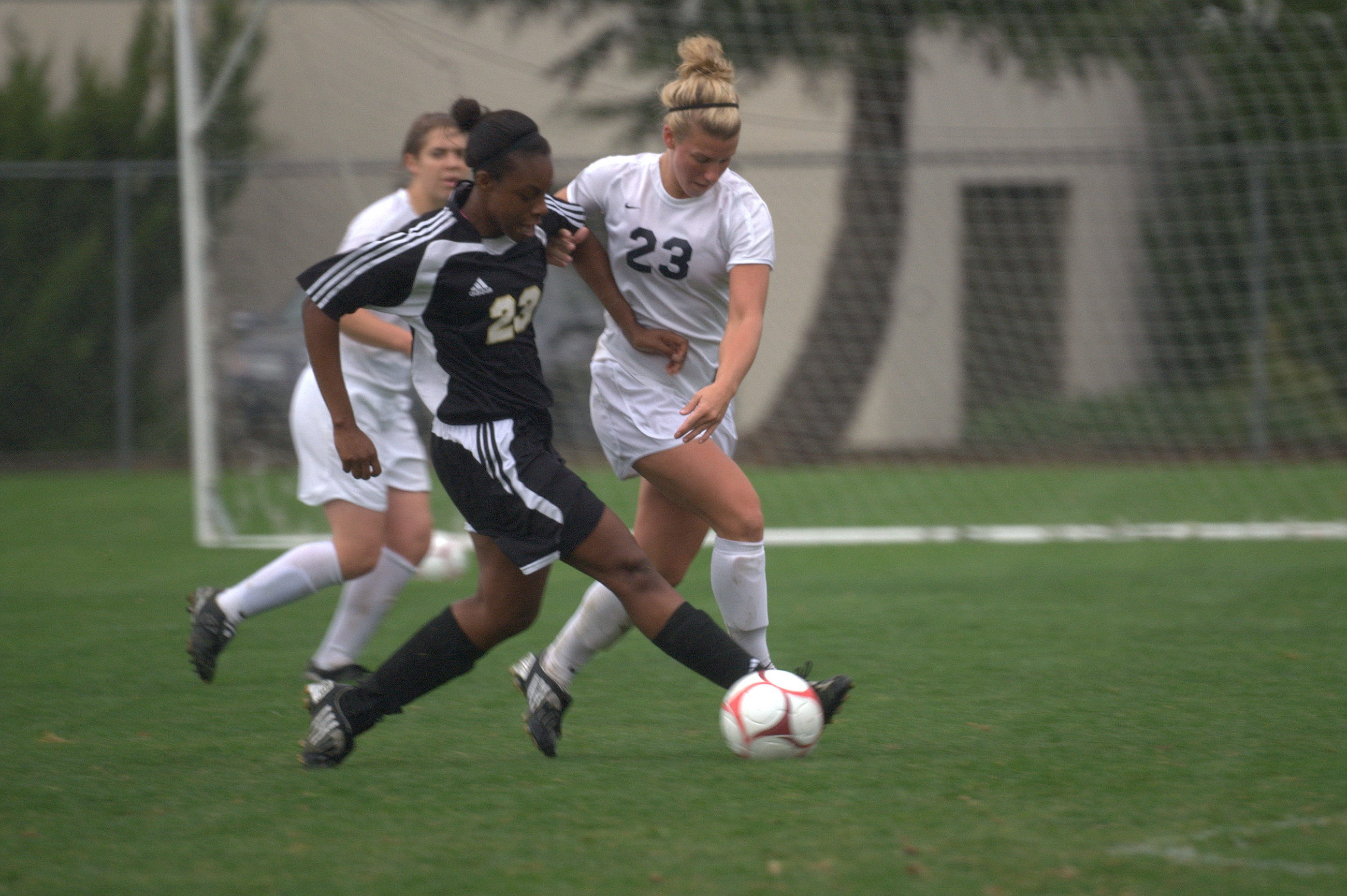
George Fox v Pacific Lutheran women's soccer match in 2008

In 2009, the school's women's basketball team went undefeated (32–0) and capped the season with a 60–53 defeat of Washington University in St. Louis in the title game. In winning, George Fox claimed the first Division III national women's championship for any program west of the Rocky Mountains. Head coach Scott Rueck was named the NCAA Division III national coach of the year.

In 2018, the women's track and field team were co-champions with University of Massachusetts Boston.

In 2023, the women's golf team won the national championship after qualifying for the national tournament for 13 consecutive years. They were the third women's golf program west of the Mississippi and the first school in the Pacific Northwest to win the title.

In 2024 the Stunt team was introduced as a varsity sport at George Fox. In its inaugural year, the team made it to the Division III national tournament as the fourth-place seed. They finished the tournament with a Third-place finish. The George Fox stunt team is currently the only ranked Division III program on the west coast.

=== Football ===
Football was reintroduced as a varsity sport at George Fox in the fall of 2014 after a 45-year hiatus from the sport. The head coach for the resurrection was Chris Casey, brother to former Bruin and Oregon State Beaver baseball coach Pat Casey.

== Student life ==
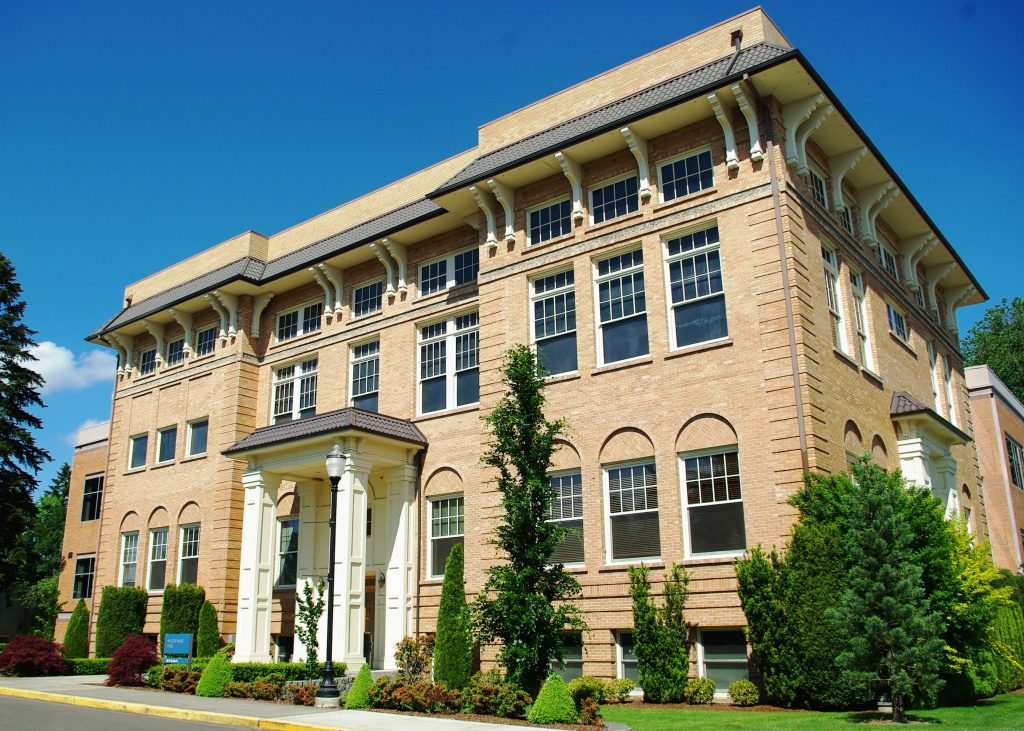
Wood-Mar Hall

George Fox University is a full member of the Council for Christian Colleges and Universities. Students sign a lifestyle agreement, attend required chapel/current-event gatherings, and participate in service projects. No statement of faith or religious preference is required to attend, although the student body is overwhelmingly Christian. Faculty members and staff are required to sign a statement professing faith in traditionally Christian doctrines.

The university hosts dozens of Christian speakers each year through twice-weekly chapel/current-event gatherings. Hundreds of students each year participate in "Serve trips" throughout the Western United States, Mexico, and Canada. In groups of 10–25, students provide volunteer labor for missions, homeless shelters, nonprofits, and other charitable causes. Faculty, staff, and students also participate in "Serve Day" each September: 90% of eligible individuals volunteer.

George Fox University is a center for Quaker thought (although only about 5% of the student body are Quakers) and houses an extensive library of historical Quaker literature. The Northwest Yearly Meeting gathers each summer on campus and is headquartered adjacent to GFU. In 1984, the university founded its Center for Peace Learning, now known as the Center for Peace and Justice.

== Campus locations ==
In addition to its main campus in Newberg, the university teaches classes in two other locations: Portland and Redmond. The Newberg campus includes two structures listed on the National Register of Historic Places. One, Minthorn Hall, was built in 1886 and is still used for classes. The other, Jesse Edwards House, was constructed in 1883 and serves as the residence for the university president.

A variety of student housing is available on Newberg's campus including 23 houses, 10 residence halls, and four apartment buildings.

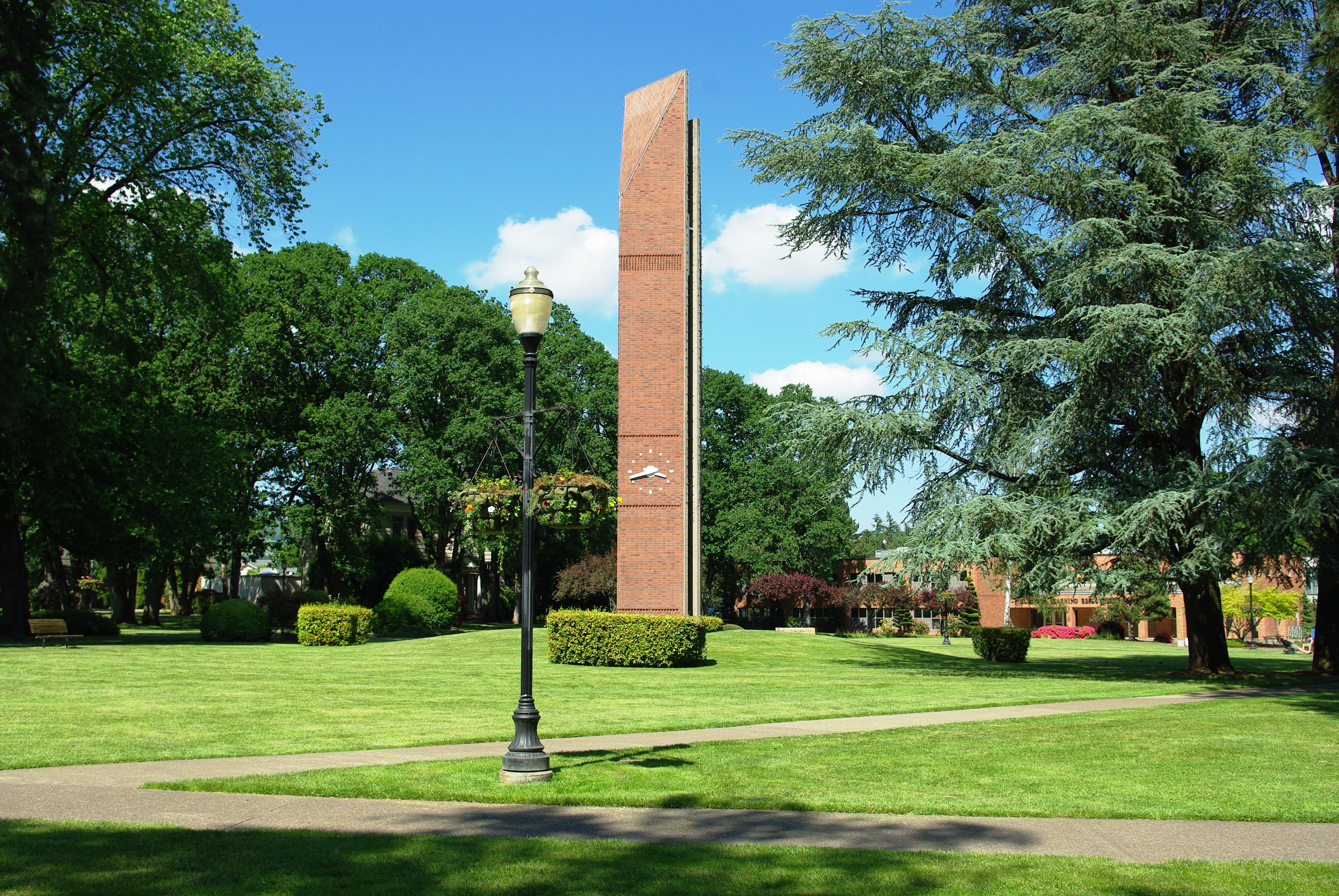
Centennial Tower

== Notable alumni ==
Those who have attended or graduated from George Fox include:

- Cherie Buckner-Webb, member of the Idaho Senate
- Robert F. Burt, Navy officer
- Ken Carter, basketball coach
- Pat Casey, baseball coach
- John Davis, member of the Oregon House of Representatives
- Aaron Elling, football placekicker
- Richard Foster, author
- Peggy Fowler, CEO of Portland General Electric
- Herbert Hoover, thirty-first President of the United States (attended Pacific Academy before his admission to Stanford)
- Rick Johnson, author and speaker
- Dan Kimball, pastor and author
- John Lim, politician and businessman
- Carmen Guerricagoitia McLean, associate judge on the Superior Court of the District of Columbia
- Gina Ochsner, writer
- Andy Olson, member of the Oregon House of Representatives
- Darleen Ortega, judge on the Oregon Court of Appeals
- Bill Post, member of the Oregon House of Representatives
- Rolf Potts, travel writer
- Robert L. Saucy, professor of systematic theology
- Daniel L. Smith-Christopher, theologian and author
- Walter R. Miles, psychologist and professor

== Notable educators ==
Those who have taught at George Fox include:

- Stan Bunn, lawyer and politician
- Mark David Hall, author
- Mark Hatfield, politician and educator
- Lynn Lundquist, former Speaker of the Oregon House of Representatives
- Leonard Sweet, professor
