= Minthorn Hall =

- U.S. National Register of Historic Places
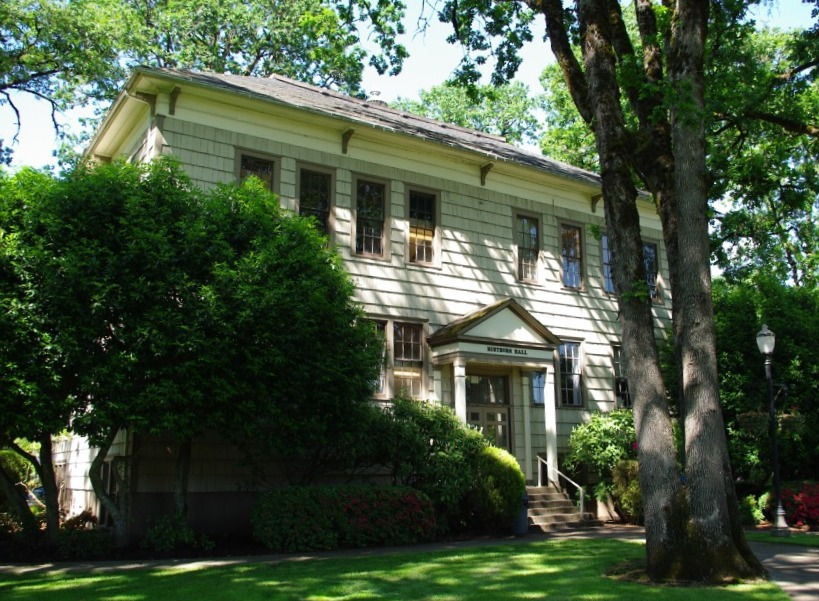
- Minthorn Hall in 2008
- Location: 414 N. Meridian Street; Newburg, Oregon
- Coordinates: 45°18′14″N 122°58′05″W
- Built: 1887
- Architectural style: Colonial Revival
- NRHP reference No.: 97000581
- Added to NRHP: June 13, 1997

Minthorn Hall is an academic building on the campus of George Fox University in Newberg, Oregon, United States. Built in 1887, the hall was moved ten blocks to its current location in 1892. The three-story frame building is the oldest building on the campus of the school, and was the first building of the Quaker school. Future President Herbert Hoover may have briefly lived in the structure prior to its conversion to a school building. The hall was added to the National Register of Historic Places on June 13, 1997.

== History ==
In 1887, construction began on a dormitory and gym for boys in Newberg for the Friends Pacific Academy, which became Pacific College in 1891. The then two-story building was completed that year and Herbert Hoover is believed to have then lived there for a few months into 1888. In 1892, the structure was moved ten blocks to its current location on the campus of what is now George Fox University by a house mover named Mr. Clark. After the move a third floor was added with the addition of a daylight basement, and the entire hall was then used as a dormitory for women.

In 1939, known then as Kanyon Hall, it was renovated under the guidance of Donald W. Edmundson, Harlan Jones, and Laurence Skene. In 1962, the residence hall was converted into classroom space in a renovation led by Donald H. Lindren. In 1992, the school restored the upper floor with lighting and woodwork reminiscent of the original 1887 structure, and the following year, 1993, the Spring Break Quake knocked the chimney over and knocked plaster off the walls. Now Minthorn Hall was added to the National Register of Historic Places on June 13, 1997.

The hall is named for Henry John and Laura Minthorn, early supporters of the college and Hoover's aunt and uncle. The family home, Hoover-Minthorn House, is also on the NRHP. Offices for faculty and a student center were added in 2004 to the oldest building on campus. In 2008, four students hung a cardboard cutout of Barack Obama in the tree outside the hall. The hanging of the then Democratic Party Presidential nominee's effigy led to the suspension of the students and other sanctions.

== Architecture ==
The Colonial Revival style structure has two above-ground floors and a daylight basement for a total of three floors. Minthorn Hall's foundation is composed of bricks, with a coating of stucco on the exterior. The building is a wood-frame structure built with rough-hewn lumber and with cedar shake siding. Composition shingles are used on the roof.
