= George Stetson =

American pastor

George Washington Stetson
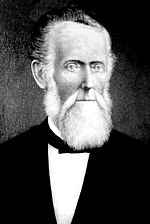
- Drawing of George Stetson
- Born: September 12, 1815; Champlain, New York
- Died: October 9, 1879 (aged 64); Edinboro, Pennsylvania
- Occupation: Pastor
- Known for: Advent Christian Church pastor and an associate of Charles Taze Russell

George Washington Stetson (September 12, 1815 – October 9, 1879) was a Christian pastor and writer for various religious periodicals.

== Biography ==
George Washington Stetson, son of Reuben and Lois (Smedley) Stetson, was born in Champlain, New York. He associated with Henry Grew and George Storrs in his early ministry, and even later with Jonas Wendell and Charles Taze Russell. He was not only a minister, but also a school teacher, and physician. As a member of the Advent Christian Church he and Wendell worked together in several churches throughout Pennsylvania and Ohio in the early 1870s. They also wrote for George Storrs’ magazine The Herald of Life and the Coming Kingdom, and for other magazines such as The World's Crisis.

He married Mary Porter (died 1855) of Pittsburgh, Pa., with whom he had two children: Mary Catherine Stetson (born Feb. 8, 1847 in Pittsburgh) and Charles Porter Stetson (born Apr. 25, 1849 in Cleveland, Ohio.) He later married Anna Elizabeth Barlow (born Apr. 15, 1834 in Winchester, Va.; died aged 94 years) with whom he had a son, George Washington Stetson (born Sept. 16, 1861 in Cleveland, Ohio.)

For ten months during 1872, Stetson was the pastor of the church in Pittsburgh where he met the young Charles Taze Russell. He was pastor of the Edinboro, Pennsylvania Advent Christian Church for six years until his death in 1879. His dying request was that Pastor Russell give his funeral sermon, where over 1,200 attended. He was buried in Edinboro, Pennsylvania. His obituary featured in the November 1879 issue of Zion's Watch Tower stated:

"Death has laid our brother low. He died at his home, Edinboro, Pa., Oct. 9th, 1879. Though an event not entirely unexpected, since he has been seriously ill for some time, yet his death is a heavy blow to his many friends abroad as well as at home. He was beloved and esteemed by his fellow townsmen of all denominations as well as by the congregation of which he was pastor."
