= Portland Seminary =

Multi-denominational, university-based school in Portland, Oregon

- Former name: George Fox Evangelical Seminary
- Type: Seminary
- Established: 1947
- Parent institution: George Fox University
- Dean: Tim Osborn
- Location: Portland, OR, USA; 45°25′40.38″N 122°44′49.05″W
- Campus: Suburban
- Website: seminary.georgefox.edu

Portland Seminary at George Fox University is a multi-denominational, university-based school that offers a variety of master's degree and postgraduate degree programs in theology, spiritual formation, and ministry, located in Portland, Oregon.

The Association of Theological Schools in the United States and Canada granted the seminary full accreditation in 1974. It remains a fully accredited member to present. The Northwest Commission on Colleges and Universities also certifies the seminary's programs.

== Mission and Identity ==
Portland Seminary is a Christ-centered community focused on preparing people spiritually, academically and professionally to a life in phase with your beliefs. It promotes individual development through online, cohort-based programs centered on relational learning. It prepares leaders for ministry within and beyond the church while maintaining a broadly evangelical, interdenominational identity that affirms women and men in all roles of ministry leadership.

== History ==
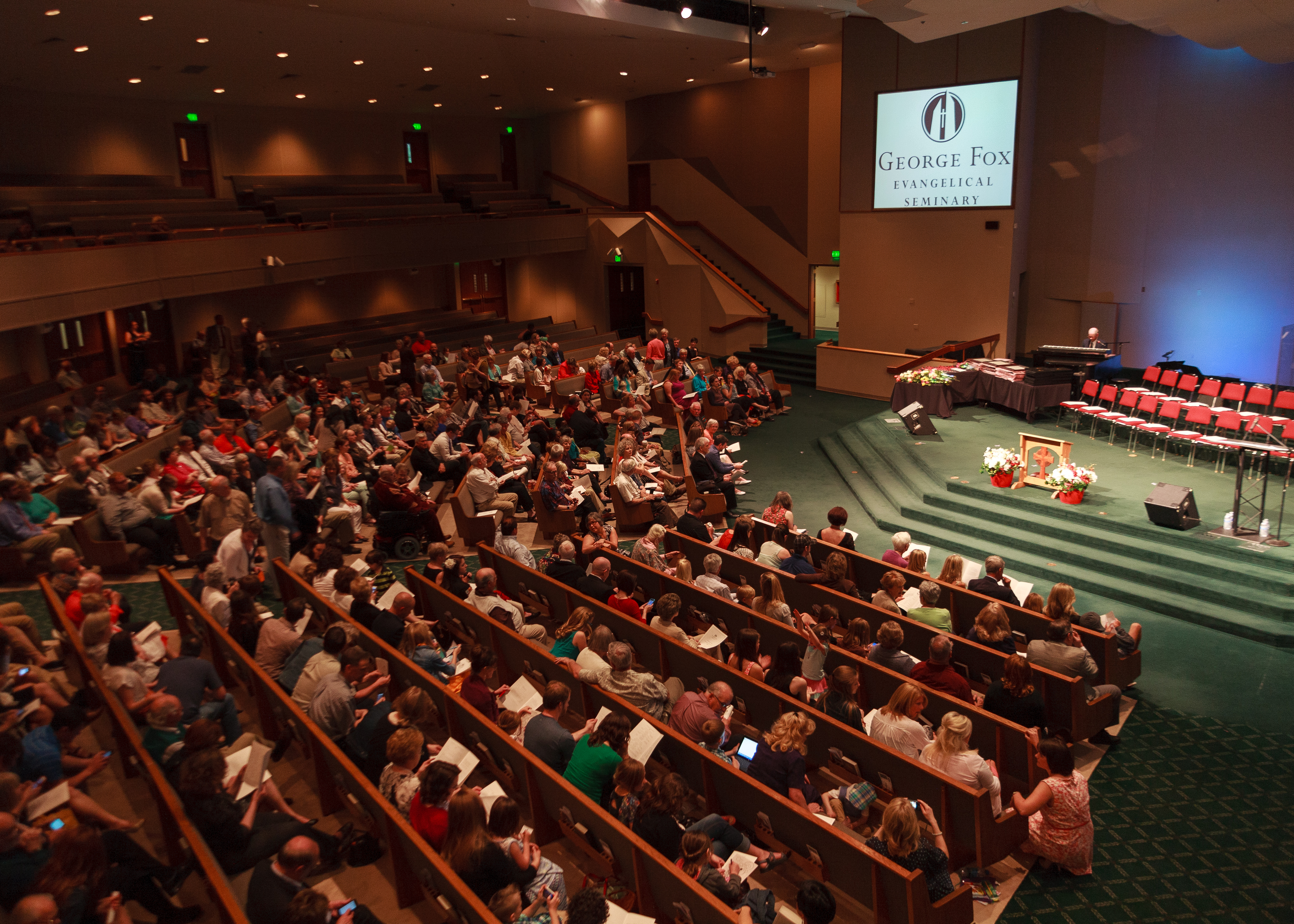
2014 commencement ceremony

Founded in 1947 as the Western School of Evangelical Religion, the original campus was on the grounds of the Evangelical Church conference in Jennings Lodge, Oregon. In 1951 the school became Western Evangelical Seminary and in 1993 moved to a new campus near Interstate 5 and highways 99W and 217. In 1996, Western Evangelical Seminary merged with George Fox College to form George Fox University and changed its name to George Fox Evangelical Seminary in 2000. On January 9, 2017, the seminary changed its name to Portland Seminary.

The first students came from these founding denominations: the Evangelical Church of North America, Northwest Yearly Meeting of Friends, the Free Methodists, the Nazarenes, and the Church of God (Anderson, Indiana). Today, more than 35 denominations are represented in the student body.

== Academics ==
Portland Seminary offers online programs that include annual hybrid intensives:

In addition to the Master of Divinity, the foundational degree for pastoral ministry, Portland Seminary also offers an MA in Ministry, an MA in Theological Studies, and an MA in Spiritual Formation. The MA in Theological Studies, with emphases in Bible or Christian History and Theology, continues to serve those called to teaching or eventual doctoral study. The Doctor of Ministry degree, for experienced pastors who hold the MDiv or an accredited master’s degree in a ministry-related field, is a cohort-style online program with two tracks: Leadership and Spiritual Formation; and Faith & Cultural Engagement. The Doctor of Leadership in Global Perspectives is a cohort-based professional doctorate that equips experienced leaders to practice theologically informed leadership.

=== Accreditation ===
The MDiv, MA in Ministry, MA in Spiritual Formation, MA in Theological Studies, Doctor of Ministry (DMin) and Doctor of Leadership (DLd) degrees are approved by the Commission on Accrediting of the Association of Theological Schools in the United States and Canada.

The Northwest Commission on Colleges and Universities also certifies the seminary's programs. This dual accreditation is maintained now through George Fox University and assures students of the highest academic and professional standards.

Degrees

- Doctor of Ministry Programs:
  - Leadership and Spiritual Formation with Kurtley Knight and Jeney Park-Hearn
  - Faith & Cultural Engagement with Leah Payne
- Doctor of Leadership Programs:
  - Leadership and Global Perspectives with Jason Swan Clark
- Master of Divinity
- Master of Arts in Theological Studies
- Master of Arts in Ministry
- Master of Arts in Spiritual Formation

Certificates

- Certification for Spiritual Directors
- Certificate in Community Initiatives

=== Awards and grants ===
Portland Seminary has received several significant grants in recent years. In 2019, the Lilly Endowment Inc. awarded a $1 million grant to the seminary’s Institute for Pastoral and Congregational Thriving (now called the Center for Thriving).The grant supported efforts to strengthen clergy leadership and help congregations better understand and respond to shifting social and cultural contexts while cultivating clarity of mission and deepening Christian practices.

In 2023, the Lilly Endowment Inc. awarded George Fox University a $1.25 million grant to support initiatives at Portland Seminary designed to help Christian women preachers strengthen their capacity to proclaim the gospel with clarity, confidence, and effectiveness.

Portland Seminary also offers several financial assistance scholarships for its degree-seeking students. These include: the Brose Scholarship; the Julius Clifton Bruner Scholarship Fund for graduate theological education, established by Iris J. Bruner in memory of her late husband; the Clapp Scholarship for M.Div. students; the Delamarter Scholarship, awarded to a Free Methodist student interested in Evangelism; the Farmer Family Scholarship; and the Ministry to Underserved Populations Scholarship, awarded to students who work in Oregon or South West Washington, serving unique underserved people groups. Among its other scholarships, the Seminary also offers the Hawks Ministerial Scholarship, the Ketterling-Schlenker Scholarship, the Clara and Harlan Macy Memorial Scholarship, the Chuan Cheng Morrisey Missions Memorial Scholarship Fund for students preparing for cross-cultural ministry, and the Richard Parker Scholarship, established by Jeannette Parker in memory of her husband.

Among its student prizes, Portland Seminary awards annual prizes for Excellence in Writing and Excellence in Preaching in honor of the American theologian and writer Frederick Buechner.
