= Garnot (disambiguation) =

Garnot may refer to:

- Prosper Garnot (1794–1838), French surgeon and naturalist.
- Jean Sainte-Fare Garnot (1908–1963), French Egyptologist.
- Garnot's House Gecko, another name for the Indo-Pacific gecko.
