= Mortuary Temple of Merneptah =

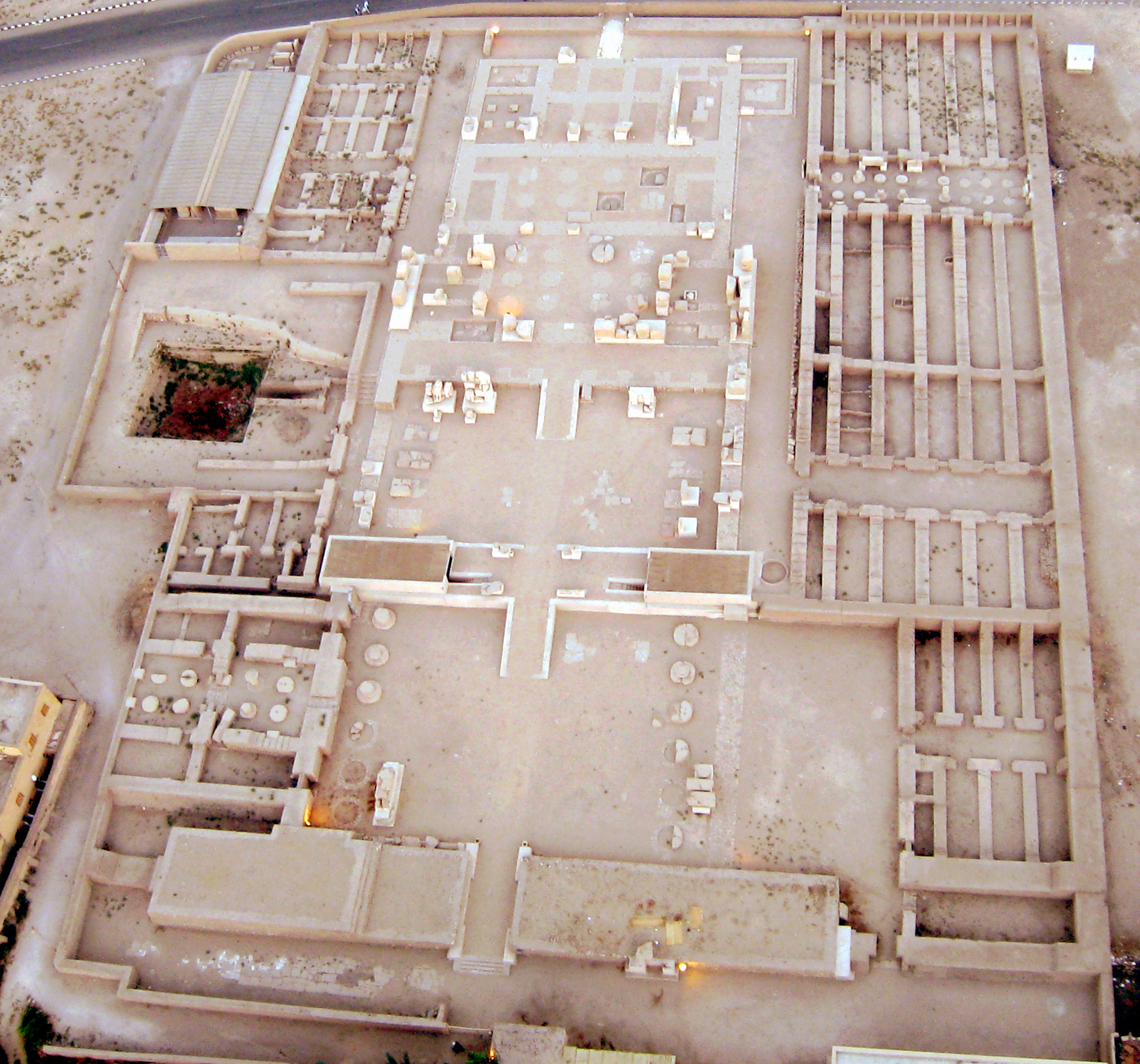
- Aerial view of the temple

- Location within Egypt
- 25.725002°N 32.606572°E
- Type: Mortuary temple
- Periods: Nineteenth Dynasty of Egypt
- Cultures: Ancient Egypt
- Location: Kurna, Egypt
- Part of: Theban Necropolis

History
- Built: c. 1210 BC
- Built by: Merneptah

Site notes
- Excavation dates: 1896
- Discovered: Flinders Petrie
- Public access: Yes

The Mortuary Temple of Merneptah is an Ancient Egyptian temple located in the Theban Necropolis, on the west bank of the Nile, near the modern village of Kurna, opposite the city of Luxor. It is the mortuary temple of the pharaoh Merneptah, son and successor of Ramesses II. The monument is nowadays almost entirely destroyed.

== Description ==
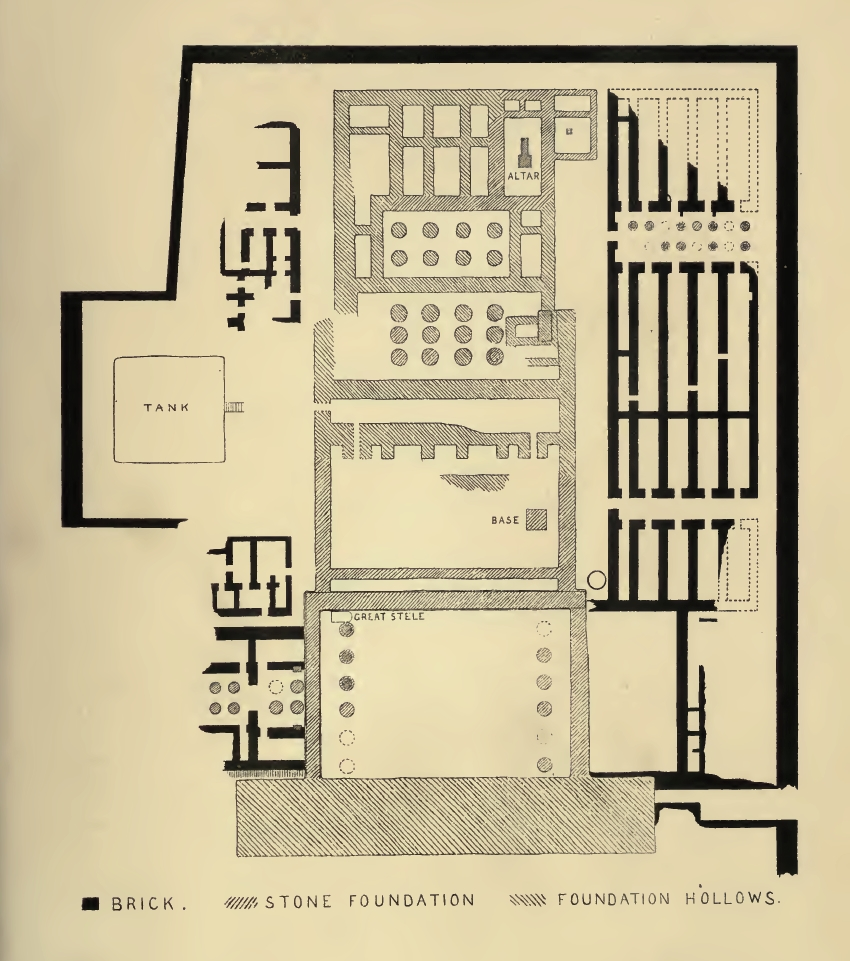
Plan of the temple by Flinders Petrie.

The temple is located in the same area as the other mortuary temples of the Theban Necropolis, about four hundred meters south of the Ramesseum and about seven hundred meters north of the mortuary temple of Ramesses III. The temple of Merneptah lies at the north-west corner of the mortuary temple of Amenhotep III, encroaching on its enclosure. In fact, the temple of Merneptah was almost entirely built from stones taken from the temple of Amenhotep III. Like most of the other New Kingdom mortuary temples of Western Thebes, the temple of Merneptah was located along the processional route of the Beautiful Festival of the Valley. The alignment and concentration of these buildings suggest that they were constructed along a canal or branch of the Nile that has since disappeared.

The funerary complex measures approximately 120 metres in length and 100 metres in width. The main part, built in stone (limestone and sandstone), follows a relatively classical plan: a first pylon opens onto a first courtyard, followed by a second pylon giving access to another courtyard. From the second courtyard, one enters the interior of the temple, which consists of two successive hypostyle halls and finally the sanctuary. The rest of the temple was built of mudbrick and consisted of a palace and various storage and service rooms.

== History ==
=== Construction and destruction ===
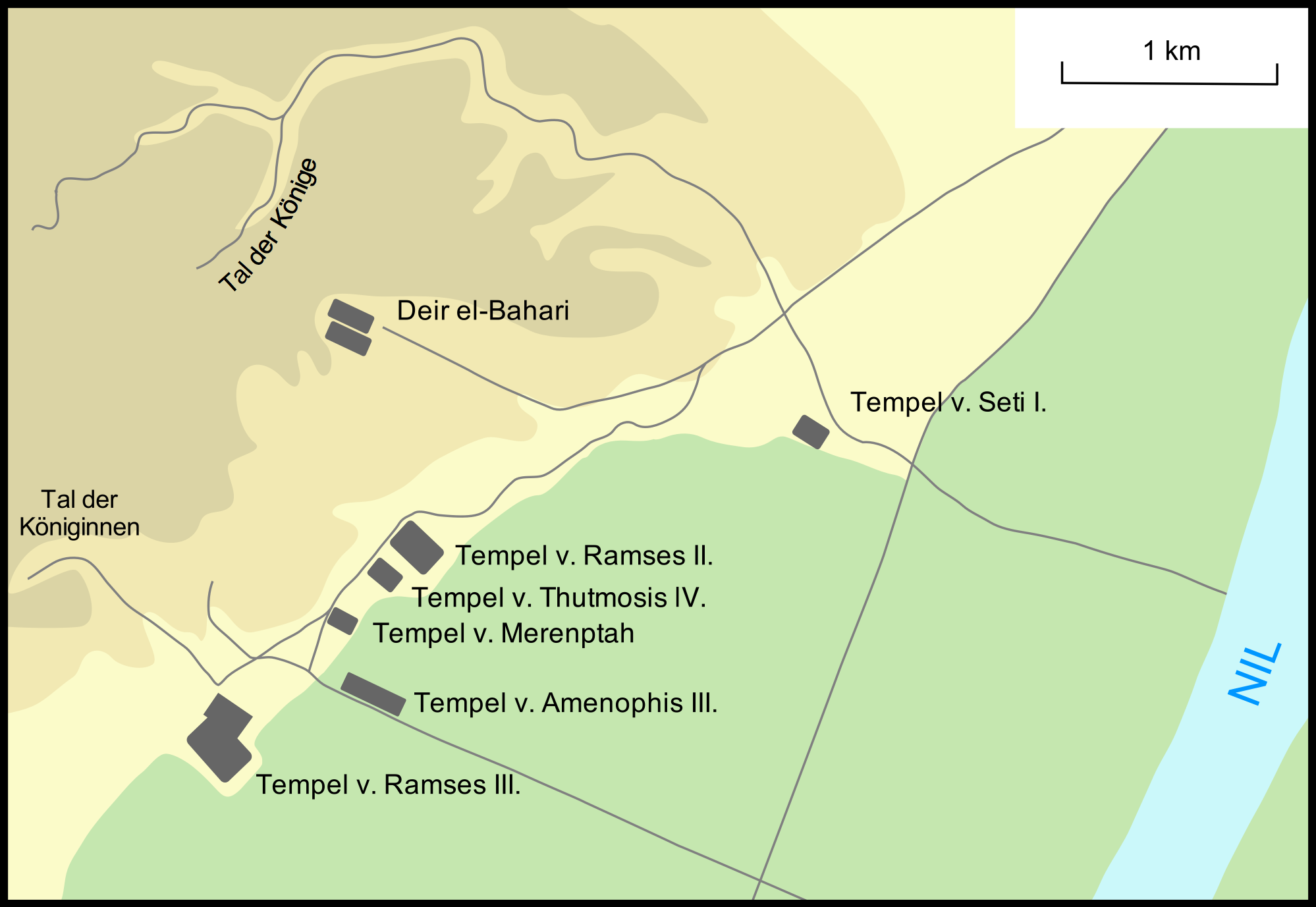
Location of the Mortuary Temple of Merneptah among the other mortuary temples of Western Thebes.

The temple was built in about five years, around 1210 BC. It was intended to ensure the cult of the pharaoh Merneptah after his death and guarantee the immortality of his soul. Workers used new materials for the construction but also extensively reused those from the nearby mortuary temple of Amenhotep III. Although built only about 150 years earlier, the mortuary temple of Amenhotep III was already largely ruined during the reign of Merneptah, probably as a result of an important earthquake. Merneptah’s workers then methodically dismantled the temple of Amenhotep III. Reused materials included both stones from the temple structure and bricks used in annexes and enclosure walls. Stelae and statues were also reused. These elements were then reworked, with stone blocks plastered and recarved, while the reverse sides of stelae were inscribed with new texts.

The exact period of the temple’s destruction is unknown, but it predates the Ptolemaic dynasty since the temple was used as a limestone quarry during that period. Some blocks from the temple of Merneptah were reused in the construction of the mortuary temple of Ramesses III in the following dynasty. In addition, some battle accounts of Ramesses III against the Sea Peoples, carved on the walls of his temple, may be copies of texts that originally decorated the mortuary temple of Merneptah.

=== Rediscovery and conservation ===
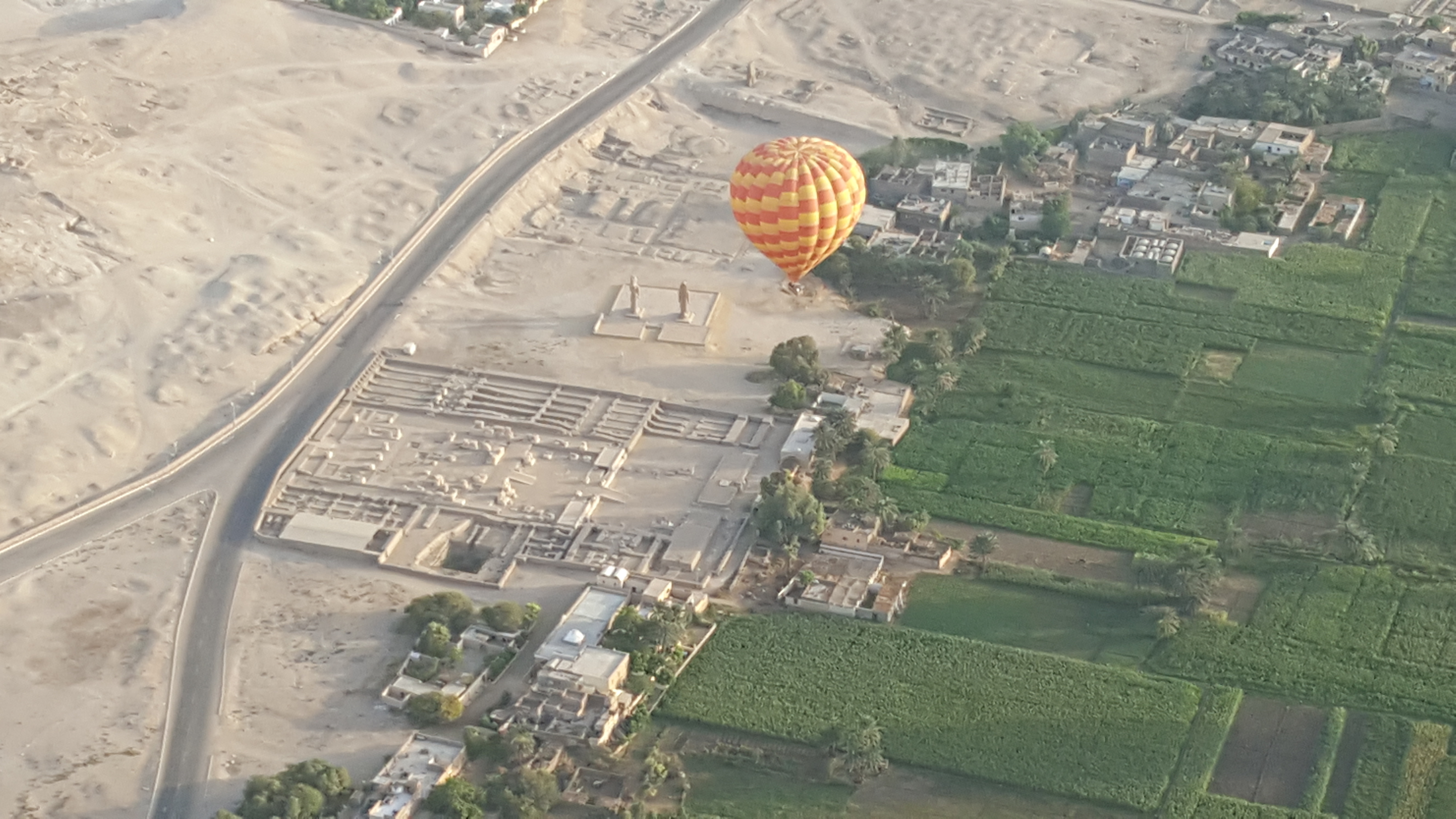
Aerial view of the temple.

When the French scholars of the Commission des Sciences et des Arts visited the Theban necropolis during the Egyptian campaign of Napoleon, the temple was already completely ruined and used as a source of limestone by local inhabitants for the production of lime. The mortuary temple of Merneptah was only truly identified several decades later. The remains were first attributed to Amenhotep III due to the extensive reuse of stones from the mortuary temple of Amenhotep III. The temple was first studied by Flinders Petrie in 1896. The British egyptologist initially intended to excavate the mortuary temple of Amenhotep III, but the concession had been granted to Jacques de Morgan, director of the Egyptian Antiquities Service. Petrie instead excavated the smaller neighboring temple, which he attributed to Merneptah. He cleared the remains, studied them in detail, and produced plans. Petrie unearthed numerous objects, including fragments of sphinxes, divine and royal statues, jackal effigies, stelae, ostraca, and pottery. Ironically, he found more material from the mortuary temple of Amenhotep III in the temple of Merneptah than Morgan did in the original temple of Amenhotep. Blocks from the temple of Amenhotep III reused in the foundations of Merneptah’s temple were particularly well preserved and retained their original decoration. Petrie also discovered the famous Victory Stele, a granite stela reused from Amenhotep III and inscribed under Merneptah. The text on the stela, recounting Merneptah’s military victories, has been widely debated because it may contain one of the earliest mentions of Israel.

More recently, the temple has been studied and restored by a team from the Swiss Institute for Architectural and Archaeological Research on Ancient Egypt led by Horst Jaritz. After seventeen years of work between 1971 and 2002, the monument was officially opened to the public in April 2002.

== Bibliography ==
- Jollois, Jean-Baptiste Prosper; de Villiers du Terrage, Édouard (1809). "Description générale de Thèbes". Description de l'Égypte (in French). Paris: Imprimerie impériale.
- Petrie, Flinders (1897). Six Temples at Thebes 1896. London: William Clowes Ltd.
- Jaritz, Horst; Bickel, Susanne (1994). "Une porte monumentale d'Amenhotep III: Second rapport préliminaire sur les blocs réemployés dans le temple de Merenptah à Gourna". Bulletin de l'Institut Français d'Archéologie Orientale (in French). 94. Cairo: Institut Français d'Archéologie Orientale: 277–285.
- Strudwick, Nigel C.; Strudwick, Helen (1999). Thebes in Egypt: A Guide to the Tombs and Temples of Ancient Luxor. New-York: Cornell University Press. ISBN 9780801436932.
- Sourouzian, Hourig (2000). "Recherches aux temples thébains d'Aménophis III (Kôm el-Hetan) et de Merenptah à Thèbes". Comptes rendus des séances de l'Académie des Inscriptions et Belles-Lettres (in French). 144 (3). Paris: Académie des Inscriptions et Belles-Lettres: 1021–1038. doi:10.3406/crai.2000.16181.
- Wilkinson, Richard H. (2000). The Complete Temples of Egypt. London: Thames & Hudson. ISBN 9780500051009.
- Drews, Robert (2000). "Medinet Habu: Oxcarts, Ships, and Migration Theories". Journal of Near Eastern Studies. 59 (3): 161–190.
- Arnold, Andreas; Zehnder, Konrad; Küng, Andreas (2002). "Deterioration and conservation of monumental stones with polychrome relief decoration in Upper Egypt: The archaeological remains of the Temple of Merenptah". Zeitschrift für Kunsttechnologie und Konservierung. Zurich: Eidgenössische Technische Hochschule Zürich. doi:10.3929/ethz-a-004708016.
- Kharma, Janine (6 April 2002). "La résurrection « suisse » du temple mortuaire de Merenptah". Le Temps (in French). Geneva. Archived from the original on 2022-04-18.
- Goedicke, Hans (2004). "Remarks on the "Israel-Stela"". Wiener Zeitschrift für die Kunde des Morgenlandes. 94: 53–72.
- Brand, Peter (2010). "Reuse and Restoration". UCLA Encyclopedia of Egyptology.
- Ullmann, Martina (2015). "The Temples of Millions of Years at Western Thebes". In Wilkinson, Richard; Weeks, Kent R. (eds.). The Oxford Handbook of the Valley of the Kings. Oxford: Oxford University Press. pp. 417–432. doi:10.1093/oxfordhb/9780199931637.013.45. ISBN 9780199931637.
- Toonen, Willem H.J.; Graham, Angus; Pennington, Benjamin T.; Hunter, Morag A.; Strutt, Kristian D.; Barker, Dominic S.; Masson-Berghoff, Aurélia; Emery, Virginia L. (2018). "Holocene fluvial history of the Nile's west bank at ancient Thebes, Luxor, Egypt, and its relation with cultural dynamics and basin-wide hydroclimatic variability". Geoarchaeology. 33 (3): 273–290. doi:10.1002/gea.21631.
- Toonen, Willem H.J.; Graham, Angus; Masson-Berghoff, Aurélia; Peeters, J.; Winkels, T.G.; Pennington, Benjamin T.; Hunter, Morag A.; Strutt, Kristian D.; Barker, Dominic S.; Emery, Virginia L.; Sollars, L.; Sourouzian, Hourig (2019). "Amenhotep III's Mansion of Millions of Years in Thebes (Luxor, Egypt): Submergence of high grounds by river floods and Nile sediments". Journal of Archaeological Science: Reports. 25: 195–205. doi:10.1016/j.jasrep.2019.03.003.
