= Bavay (disambiguation) =

Bavay may refer to:

== People ==
- Arthur René Jean Baptiste Bavay (1840-1923), French pharmacist, herpetologist and malacologist.
- Laurent Bavay (born 1972), is a Belgian Egyptologist.

== Other ==
- Bavay, a French commune.
- Bavay (surname)
- Louvignies-Bavay, a former commune in the Nord department in northern France.
- Houdain-lez-Bavay, a commune in the Nord department in northern France.
