= K. A. C. Creswell =

English architectural historian

Sir K. A. C. Creswell
- Born: 13 September 1879; London, England
- Died: 8 April 1974 (aged 94); England
- Occupation: Architectural historian

Sir Keppel Archibald Cameron Creswell CBE FBA FSA (13 September 1879 – 8 April 1974) was an English architectural historian who wrote some of the seminal works on Islamic architecture in Egypt.

== Early life ==
Creswell was born on 13 September 1879 in London. He was educated at Westminster School before going on to study electrical engineering at Finsbury City and Guilds Technical College in 1896. During this time he developed his considerable skills in draughtsmanship. He worked for Siemens Brothers and then, from 1914, the Deutsche Bank in London.

Creswell was interested in eastern buildings and places from childhood. By 1910 he had become so drawn to Islamic architecture that he started collecting a library that was eventually to become one of the most comprehensive private collections of its kind. As well as working at his engineering day job, he spent time studying eastern architecture. He published an article in The Burlington Magazine in 1913, and soon after gave a paper to the Royal Asiatic Society, which was well received. Both concerned domes in Persian architecture.

His interest in Islamic architecture spurred him to look for more satisfying employment, and in May 1914 he applied, unsuccessfully, to join the Archaeological Survey of India. The First World War broke out in August of that year, and in April 1916 he was selected on probation for appointment as Assistant Equipment Officer in the Royal Flying Corps. Some time afterwards he was posted to Egypt. He rose through the ranks, and by July 1919 had been appointed (as an Army Captain) as Inspector of Monuments under General Allenby's Occupied Enemy Territory Administration in Palestine and Syria. He travelled extensively, making measured drawings and notes as well as recording the monuments photographically, producing nearly a thousand photographs. He was appointed a Member of the Order of the British Empire in the 1919 New Year Honours.

== Early Muslim Architecture (EMA) and The Muslim Architecture of Egypt (MAE) ==
In May 1920 Creswell drew up a proposal for a History of the Muslim Architecture of Egypt. He intended this to be an exhaustive study of the subject. As well as detailed descriptions of individual monuments, bolstered with plans, drawings and photographs, there were also to be chapters on the development of certain features, such as minarets, domes and madrasas. He submitted the proposal to King Fuad I of Egypt, who recognised the importance of such a work and was an enthusiastic patron. Creswell was granted 800 Egyptian pounds for three years to finance the work. Creswell hastily returned to England for demobilisation, and returned to Cairo on 13 October 1920.

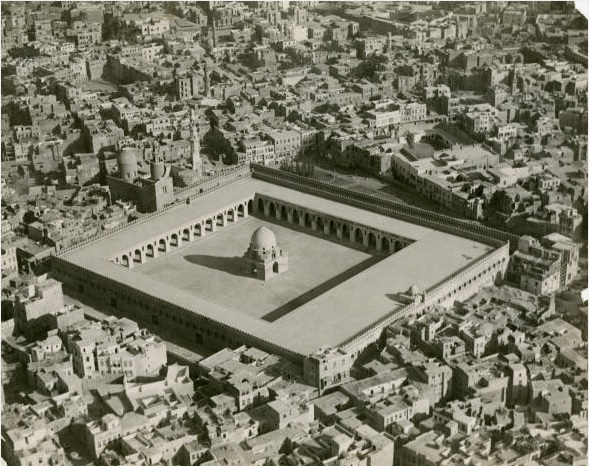
Aerial view of Ibn Tulun's mosque and the surrounding neighbourhood

The work proved to be even more monumental than Creswell had anticipated. Archaeological excavations had significantly increased the number of known monuments, and no draughtsman was made available to him. He undertook all the work without assistance. Five volumes had been published by 1969, totalling 1,769 pages, with a sixth volume in preparation but unpublished on his death in 1974. This massive work was split into two: Early Muslim Architecture (Volume I published in 1932; Volume II published in 1940; Volume I second edition in 1969) and The Muslim Architecture of Egypt (Volume I published in 1952; Volume II published in 1959).

== Other works ==
Creswell first started work on the Bibliography of the Architecture, Arts and Crafts of Islam in 1912; it was finally published in 1961. This drew together all the books, articles and periodical volumes that concerned this very wide field, and comprised the listing of some 12,300 books and nearly as many periodical volumes. A supplement appeared in 1973.

As well as these huge undertakings, Creswell produced an additional sixty-odd articles and other writings.

== Teaching and other posts held; honours awarded ==
Creswell was appointed a lecturer at Fuad University (now Cairo University) in Cairo in 1931, and within three years was made Professor of Islamic Art and Architecture. He held this post until 1951. In 1956 he was appointed a Distinguished Professor of Islamic Art and Architecture at the American University in Cairo.

In 1939 he became a member of the Higher Council for the Conservation of Arab Monuments, holding this post for 12 years. He was keenly involved in the recording and preservation of the twelfth-century wall and gates of medieval Cairo. From 1949 until 1967 he was a Trustee of the Palestine Archaeological Museum in Jerusalem.

Creswell was elected a Fellow of the British Academy in 1947, became a C.B.E. in 1955 and was knighted in 1970, at the age of ninety.

== Later years ==
In 1956 the Suez Crisis ensured the unpopularity of the British in Egypt. The government advised Creswell to leave the country. On learning that his library could not be exported, Creswell resolved to stay. The American University in Cairo offered to house the books on his behalf, and Creswell accepted, albeit with some exceedingly strict strings attached: the students, for example, were not allowed to touch the books.

In 1959 he was awarded the Triennial Gold Medal by the Royal Asiatic Society of Great Britain and Ireland.

In June 1973, his health failing, Creswell returned to England. He died on 8 April 1974 and is Buried in Acton Cemetery in West London in grave number 53BM. He never married.

Creswell bequeathed his library of 3,000-plus volumes to the American University in Cairo, along with his collection of some 11,000 photographic prints. The Ashmolean Museum in Oxford received the photographic negatives. More than 2,700 prints were sent to art historian Bernard Berenson, a friend of Creswell.

== See also ==
- Pro-Jerusalem Society (1918-1926) - Creswell was a member of its leading Council
- Photo collection at the Rare Books and Special Collections Library CONTENTdm
- AUC’s Creswell Cairo Collection Exhibition held in 2020 at the American University in Cairo on the occasion of his relocation to Cairo: Sneak Peek: AUC’s Creswell Cairo Collection Exhibition, February 17, 2020

== Sources ==
- Stefano Anastasio, 2023, Mesopotamia, Syria and Transjordan in the Archibald Creswell Photograph Collection of the Biblioteca Berenson, Archaeopress
- C. L. Geddes et al., 1965, Studies in Islamic Art and Architecture in Honour of Professor K. A. C. Creswell Cairo
- Grabar, O. (ed), 1991, K. A. C. Creswell and His Legacy Muqarnas, an Annual on Islamic Art and Architecture Vol 8 Leiden: E J Brill
- Hamilton, R. W., 1974, 'Keppel Archibald Cameron Creswell 1879–1974' Proceedings of the British Academy, Volume LX, 459–476
- Karnouk, Gloria, 1991, 'The Creswell Library: A Legacy' Muqarnas, an Annual on Islamic Art and Architecture Vol. 8, 117–124

== Articles ==
- Creswell, K.A.C. (1916). "A brief Chronology of the Muhammadan monuments of Egypt to A. D. 1517 [avec 18 planches]". BIFAO. 16: 39–164.
- Creswell, K.A.C. (1921). "The origin of the Cruciform plan of Cairene Madrasas [avec 12 planches]". BIFAO. 21: 1–54.
- Creswell, K.A.C. (1921). "The Origin of the Cruciform Plan of Cairene Madrasas". BIFAO. XXI: 1–54.
- Creswell, K.A.C. (1923). "Archæological researches at the Citadel of Cairo [avec 30 planches]". BIFAO. 23: 89–167.
- Creswell, K.A.C. (1924). "A Provisional Bibliography of the Moslem Architecture of Syria and Palestine". Jerusalem 1920-1922. London: 70-94.
- Creswell, K.A.C. (1926). "The Evolution of the Minaret, with Special Reference to Egypt". Burlington Magazine. XLVIII: 134–40, 252–8 and 290–98.
- Creswell, K.A.C. (1926). "The works of Sultan Bibars al-Bunduqdârî in Egypt [avec 31 planches]". BIFAO. 26: 129–193.
- Creswell, K.A.C. (1932). "La mosquée de 'Amru [avec 12 planches]". BIFAO. 32. Translated by Mme R. L. Devonshire: 121–166.
