= Daumas (surname) =

Daumas is a French surname. Notable people by that name include:

- Emma Daumas (born 1983), French singer-songwriter.
- Eugène Daumas (1803–1871), French general and writer.
- Louis-Joseph Daumas (1801–1887), French sculptor and medallist.
- François Daumas, French Egyptologist.
