= Henriette Devonshire =

French translator and travel writer

Henriette Caroline Devonshire, née Vulliamy, who published as Mrs. R. L. Devonshire (1864-1949) was a French translator and travel writer.

Henriette Vulliamy married the English lawyer Robert Llewellyn Devonshire. They settled in Maadi, a suburb of Cairo, in 1913.

K. A. C. Creswell was a friend and collaborator.

== Works ==
- (tr.) The life of Pasteur by René Vallery-Radot. 2 vols. London: Constable, 1902.
- (tr.) Vols 1 and 2 of Life and Letters of H. Taine by Hippolyte Taine. Westminster: Constable, 1902-4.
- (tr.) Flaubert by Émile Faguet. Boston, New York: Houghton Mifflin Co., 1914.
- Rambles in Cairo, Cairo, 1917
- Some Cairo mosques, and their founders, Cairo, 1921
- (tr.) Relation d'un voyage du sultan Qâitbây en Palestine et en Syrie. Translated from the Arabic. Cairo, 1921.
- Quatre-vingts mosquées et autres monuments musulmans du Caire. Guide des visiteurs, Cairo: De l'institut Français d'Archeologie Orientale, 1925.
- L'Égypte musulmane et les fondateurs de ses monuments, Paris: Maisonneuve Frères, 1926.
- Eighty mosques and other Islamic monuments in Cairo, Paris, 1930. Enlarged from the French edition.
- Creswell, K.A.C. (1932). "La mosquée de 'Amru [avec 12 planches]". BIFAO. 32. Translated by Mme R. L. Devonshire: 121–166.
- Quelques influences islamiques sur les arts de l'Europe, Cairo: Imp. E. and R. Schindler, 1935.
- Moslem builders of Cairo, Cairo: R. Schindler, 1943
