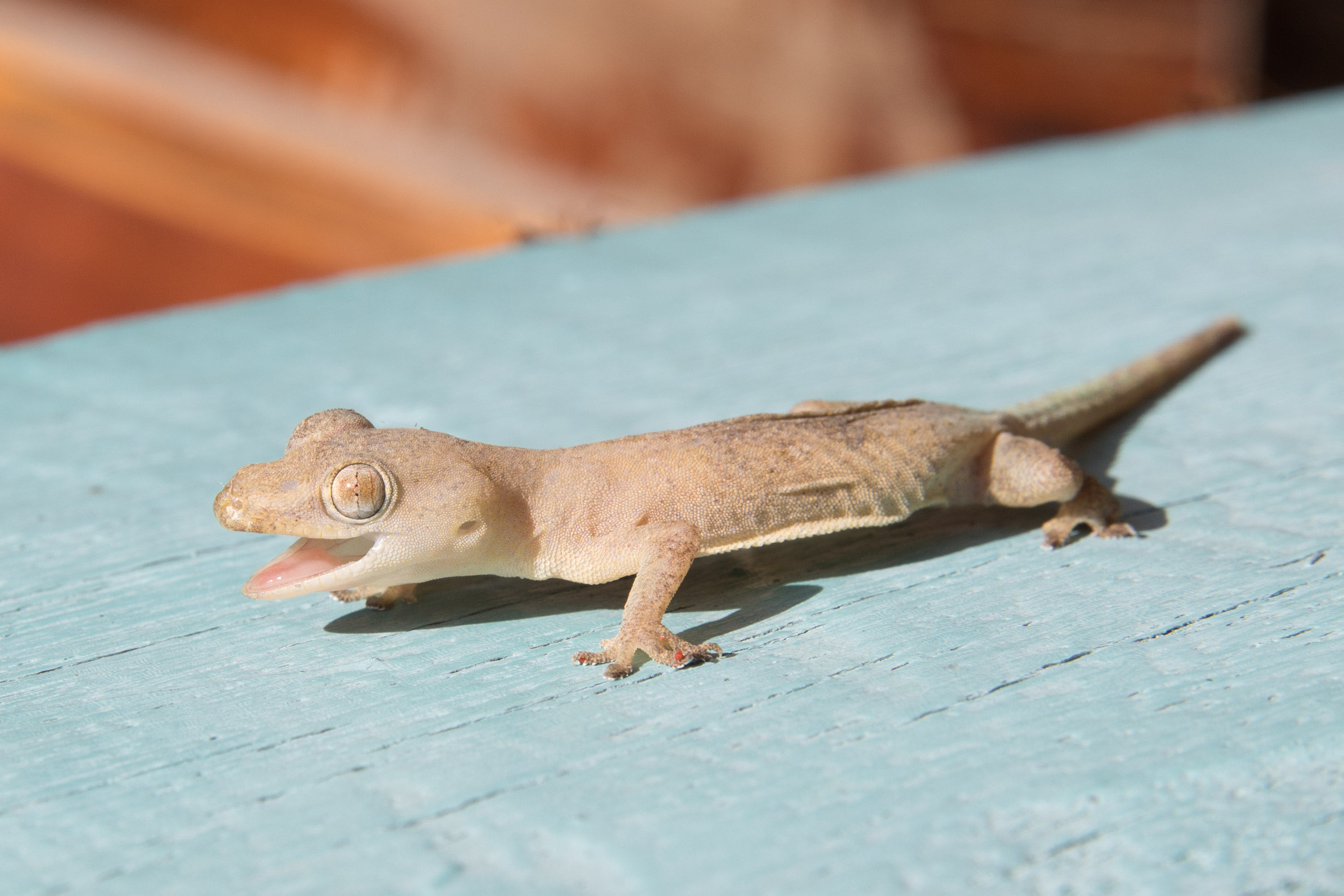
- Common house gecko with its mouth open

Conservation status
- Least Concern (IUCN 3.1)

Scientific classification
- Kingdom: Animalia
- Phylum: Chordata
- Class: Reptilia
- Order: Squamata
- Suborder: Gekkota
- Family: Gekkonidae
- Genus: Hemidactylus
- Species: H. frenatus

Binomial name
- Hemidactylus frenatus Duméril & Bibron, 1836
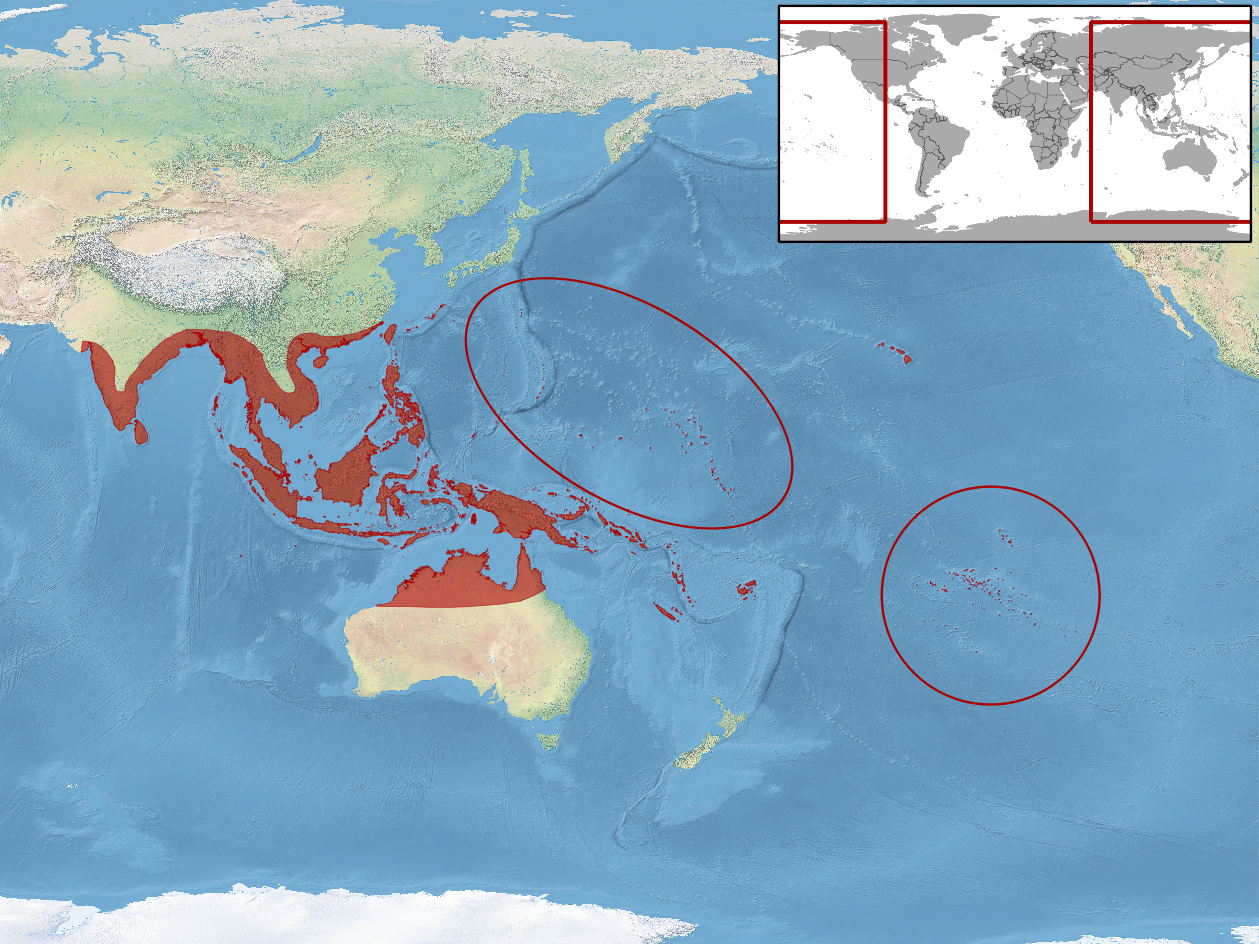

Audio
- Chirp

= Common house gecko =

Species of reptile

The Common house gecko (Hemidactylus frenatus) is a gecko native to South and Southeast Asia and Near Oceania. It is also known as the Asian house gecko, Pacific house gecko, wall gecko, House lizard, Tiktiki, chipkali and moon lizard.

The common house gecko is nocturnal, hiding during the day and foraging for insects at night. They can be seen climbing walls of houses and other buildings in search of insects attracted to porch lights, and are immediately recognisable by their characteristic chirping.

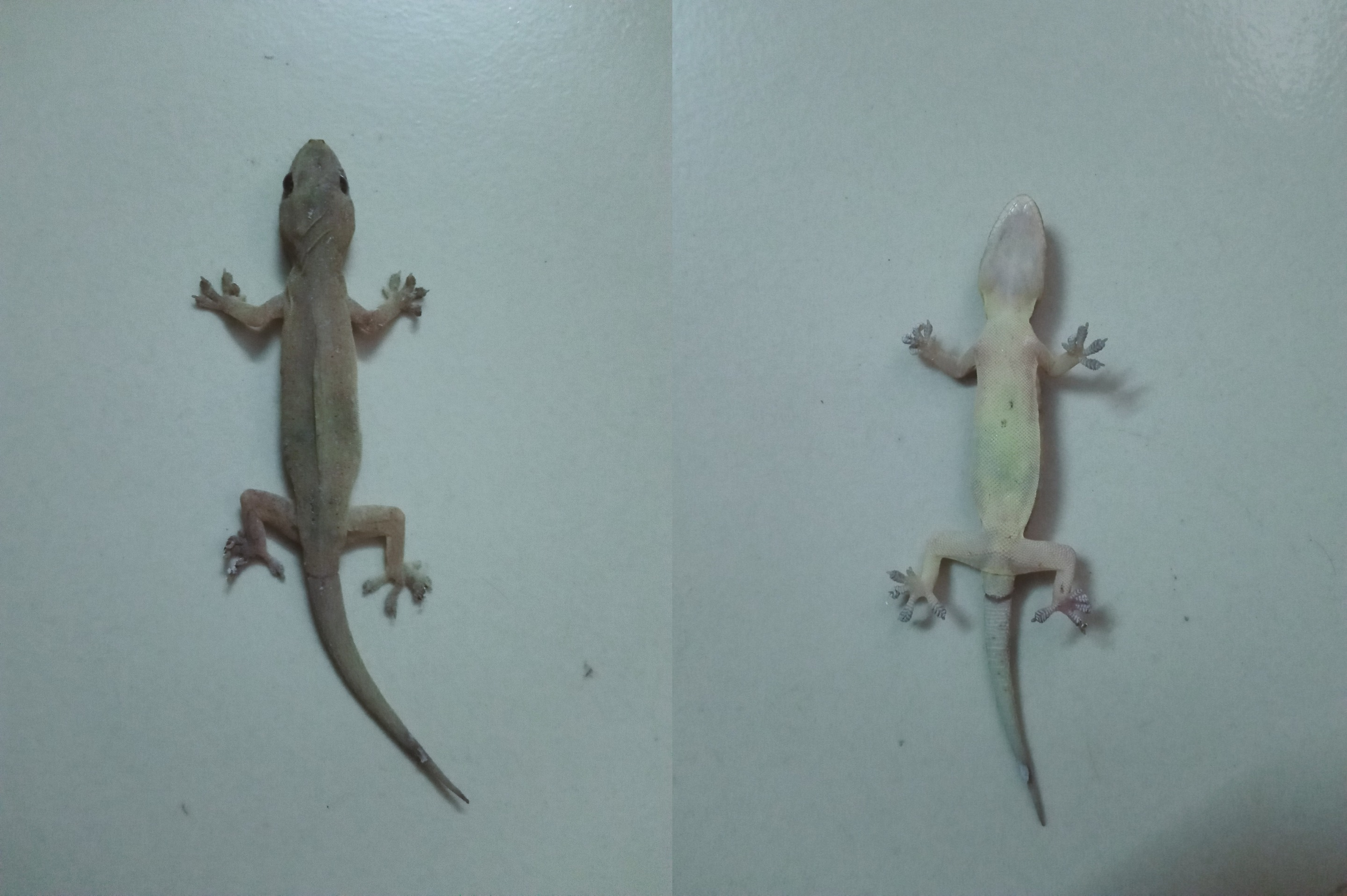
Dorsal and ventral view of common house gecko

They grow to a length of between 7.5–15 cm (3–6 in), and live for about 7 years. They are non-venomous and not harmful to humans. Most medium-sized to large geckos are docile, but may bite if distressed, which might pierce skin. The common house gecko is a tropical species, and thrives in warm, humid areas where it can crawl around on rotting wood in search of the insects it eats, as well as within urban landscapes in warm climates. The animal is very adaptable and may prey on insects and spiders, displacing other gecko species which are less robust or behaviourally aggressive. In parts of Australia and Papua New Guinea they are often confused with a similar native lizard, the dubious dtella.

== Etymology ==
The Latin word frenatus means "harnessed" or "bridled". This refers to the dark streaks on the sides of the head between the eyes and the nostrils.

== Habitat and diet ==
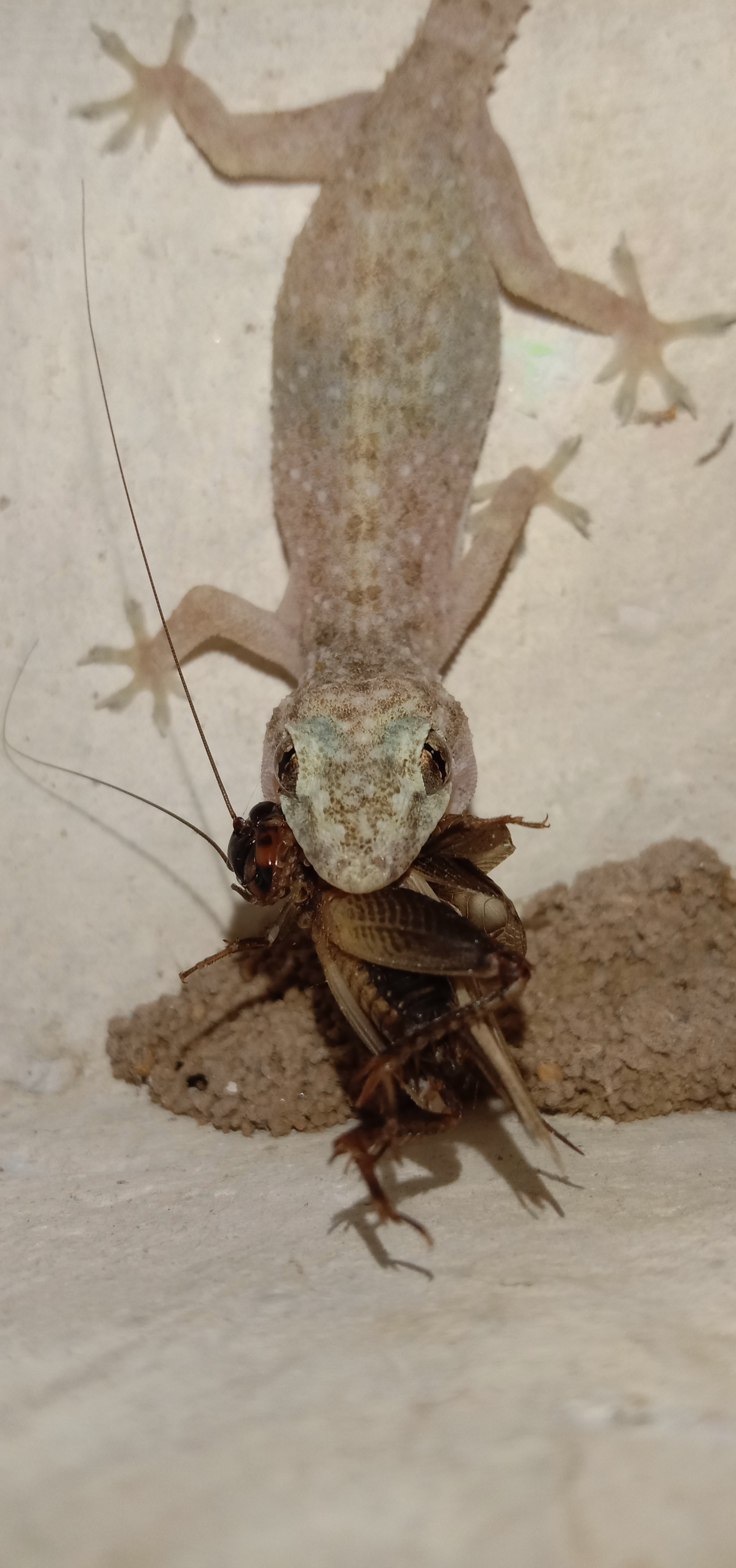
Common house gecko with a caught insect in India

The common house gecko is by no means a misnomer, displaying a clear preference for urban environments. The synanthropic gecko displays a tendency to hunt for insects in close proximity to urban lights. They have been found in bushland, but the current evidence seems to suggest they have a preference for urban environments, with their distribution being mostly defined by areas within or in close proximity to city bounds.

The common house gecko appears to prefer areas in the light which are proximal to cracks, or places to escape. Geckos without an immediate opportunity to escape potential danger display behavioural modifications to compensate for this fact, emerging later in the night and retreating earlier in the morning. Without access to the urban landscape, they appear to prefer habitat which is composed of comparatively dense forest or eucalypt woodland which is proximal to closed forest.

The selection of primarily urban habitats makes available the preferred foods of the common house gecko. The bulk of the diet of the gecko is made up of invertebrates, primarily hunted around urban structures. Primary invertebrate food sources include cockroaches, termites, some bees and wasps, butterflies, moths, flies, spiders, and several beetle groupings. It also feeds on molluscs and smaller geckos. There is limited evidence that cannibalism can occur in laboratory conditions, but this is yet to be observed in the wild.

== Distribution ==
The common house gecko is prolific through the tropics and subtropics. It is able to exist in an ecologically analogous place with other Hemidactylus species. Despite being native throughout Southeast Asia, recent introductions, both deliberate and accidental, have seen them recorded in the Deep South of the United States, large parts of tropical and sub-tropical Australia, and many other countries in South and Central America, the Caribbean (Dominican Republic), Africa, the Indian Subcontinent and the Middle East (Bahrain, Jordan, Qatar, Kuwait, Saudi Arabia, Oman and the United Arab Emirates). Most recently, this species has also invaded the Caribbean Lesser Antilles, and is now present on Saint Martin (island), Saint Barthélemy, Sint Eustatius, Dominica, Saba (island) and Saint Lucia. Their capacity to withstand a wide range of latitudes is also partially facilitated by their capacity to enter a state of brumation during colder months. The prospect of increased climate change interacts synergistically with increased urbanisation, greatly increasing the prospective distribution of the common house gecko. Due to concerns over its potential capacity as an invasive species, there are efforts to limit their introduction and presence in locations where they could be a risk to native gecko species.

In Mexico, H. frenatus was first collected in Acapulco, Guerrero, in March 1895 and found to be well established there and in the surrounding regions by the early 1940s. It was likely introduced through shipping and cargo. H. frenatus now occurs throughout the lowlands of Mexico on both the Atlantic and Pacific versants including the Yucatan Peninsula, and Baja California, with records from 21 of the 32 Mexican states. Most records of H. frenatus in Mexico are from buildings such as homes, hotels, and other structure in cities and towns, with only a few reports of the species in natural habitat, and its impact, if any, on native fauna there is unknown.

House gecko hunting the pointer of a computer mouse

== As an invasive species ==
There is evidence to suggest that the presence of Hemidactylus frenatus has negatively impacted native gecko populations throughout tropical Asia, Central America and the Pacific.

Some species which have been displaced include:

- Lepidodactylus lugubris
- Hemidactylus garnotti
- The genus Nactus on the Mascarene Islands (three species in this genus are now considered to be extinct)

As an introduced species, they pose a threat through the potential introduction of new parasites and diseases, but have potential negative impacts which extend beyond this. The primary cause for concern appears to exist around their exclusionary behaviour and out-competition of other gecko species. Mechanistically, three explanations have been derived to justify the capacity of H. frenatus to outcompete other gecko species:

1. Possessing a smaller body size. They fail to displace native species larger than themselves, such as the robust velvet gecko.
2. Male H. frenatus displaying higher levels of aggression than females of other gecko species (particularly parthenogenic species with asexual females).
3. Sexual females displaying an increased capacity to compete in comparison to asexual females.

These differences provide H. frenatus a competitive edge in the limited urban areas they preferentially inhabit, particularly those with high degrees of habitat fragmentation. To compound this, they also are capable of operating on higher densities, which leads to an increase in gecko sightings and biomass in an area, even after reducing native species' density. The common house gecko also displays a higher tolerance to high light levels, which may allow for an increased risk-reward pay off in hunting endeavours. There is also some limited evidence for cannibalism, hunting on other small gecko species, particularly juveniles. Most of this evidence is in laboratory conditions, with several studies failing to find evidence of cannibalism in the wild for this species.

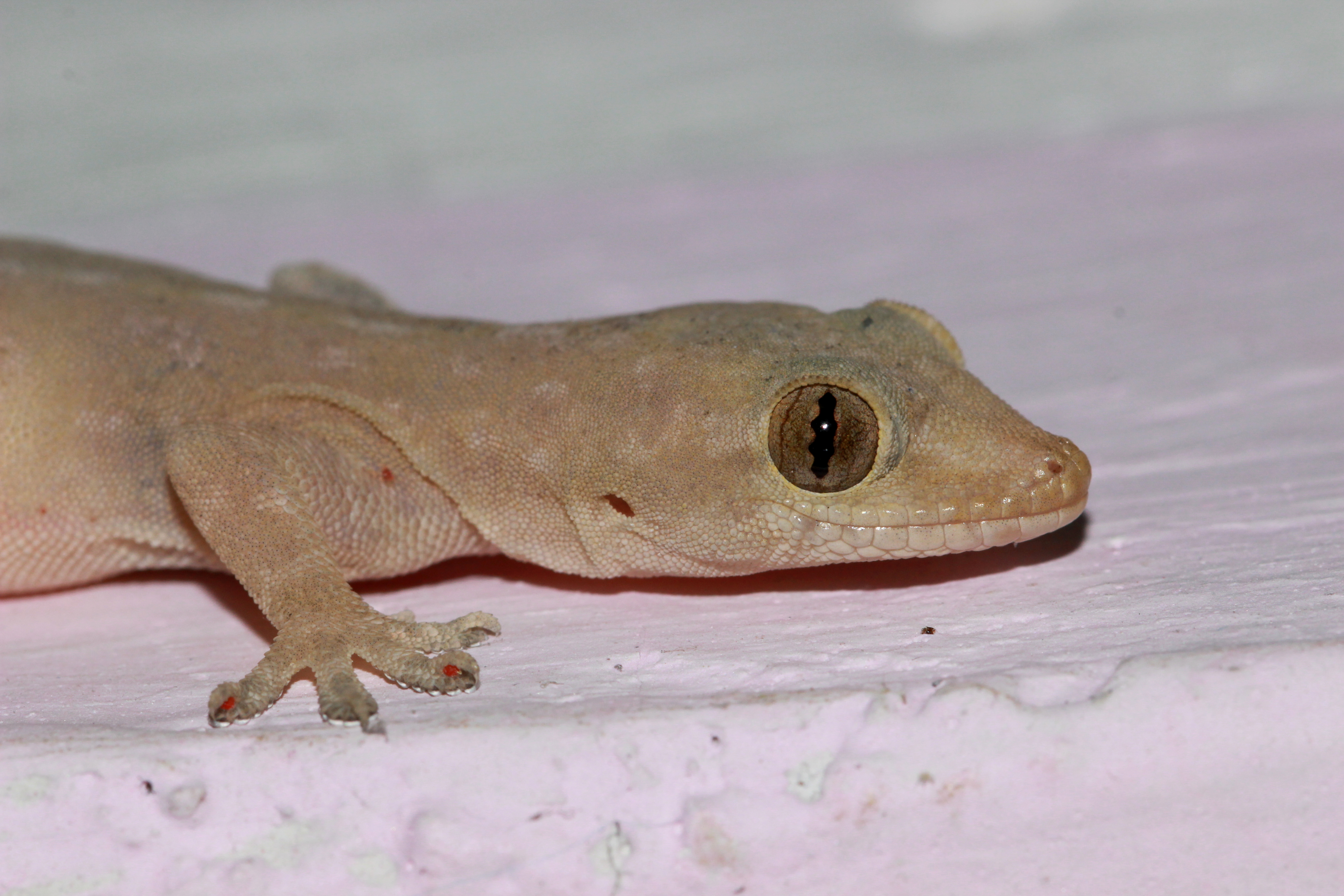
Head profile

Some males are more territorial than others. Territorial males will display larger heads, with a more pronounced head shape. This increase in head size incurs the cost of a poorer performance in escape sprint time. This suggests selective pressure prioritises the biting force capacity of the male, over their capacity to escape quickly. On the contrary, increases in female head size are met with a proportionate increase in hind limb length and no decrease in speed. Though both sexes use escape sprinting as a survival strategy, males are more likely to need to stop and fight using biting, due to the reduced mobility caused by disproportionate head to hind leg size, which in turn is correlated with localised territorial behaviours.

The success of the common house gecko can also be explained through other elements of competition, such as postural displays and movement patterns. An example of this is how the common house gecko can trigger an "avoidance response" in the mourning gecko, causing it to avoid a specific area where food may become available. Though triggering avoidance in other species, they themselves can tolerate the presence of other gecko species well, regardless of whether those species are smaller or larger, faster or slower, or more physically aggressive or not. This allows them greater access to feeding areas and territories, making them a highly successful invasive species.

== Physiology ==
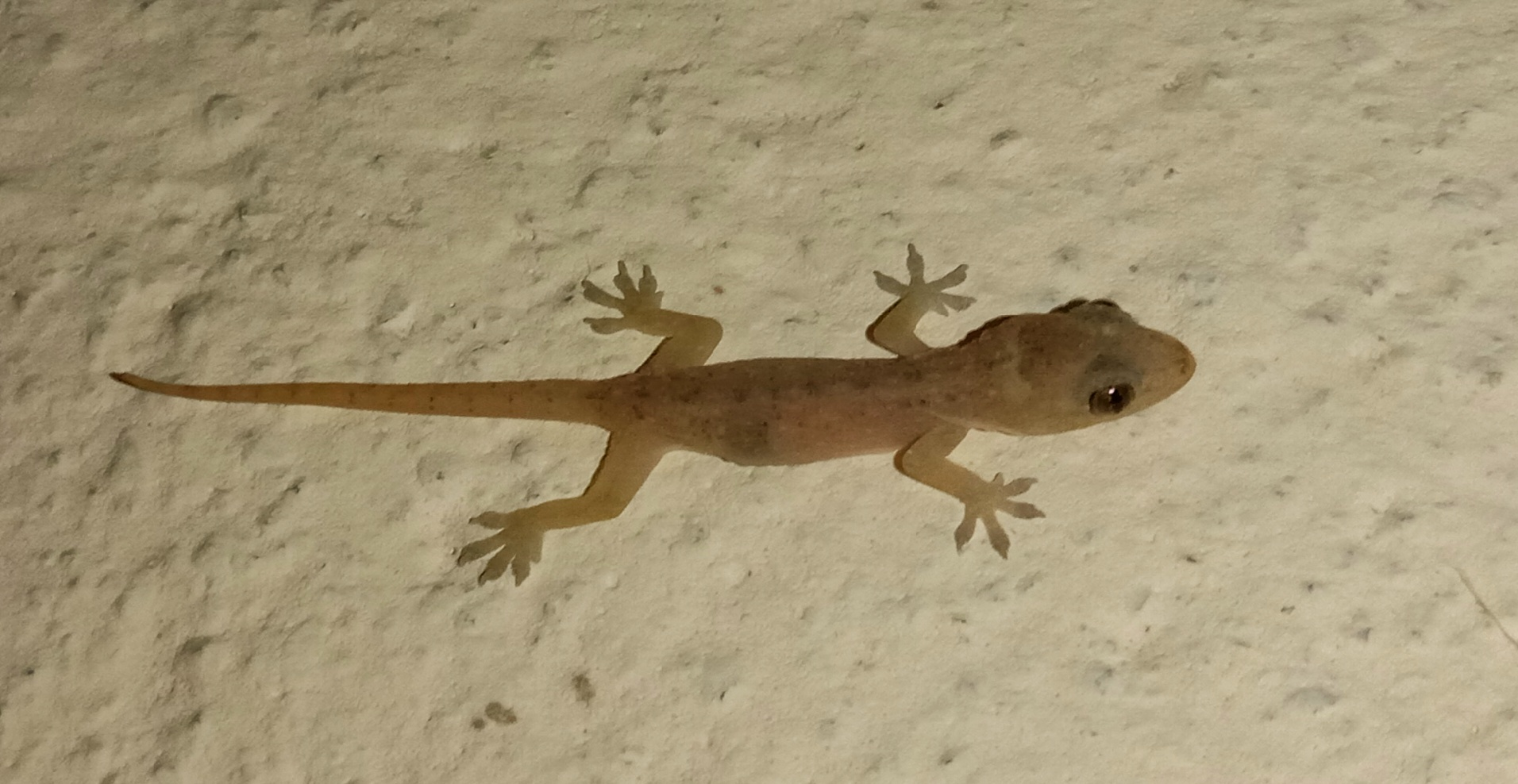
A baby house gecko

The common house gecko is ectothermic ("cold-blooded") and displays a variety of means of thermoregulating through behaviour. Its physiology has ramifications for its distribution and nature of interaction with native species, as well as reproductive success as an introduced species.

Metabolically, the demand of the common house gecko is not significantly variable from other lizard species of a similar size, with oxygen consumption appearing congruent with trends observed in other tropical, subtropical and temperate species of gecko. Thermal independence exists between 26–35 degrees Celsius, with some capacity to self regulate temperature. This means that where the environmental temperature is 26–35 degrees Celsius, the common house gecko can modify body temperature through behavioural adaptations. Breathing rates of geckos are temperature dependent above this maximal heat, but independent as it grows colder. There are behavioural mechanisms of thermoregulation present, such as the selection of sunlight and the substrates on which they sit.

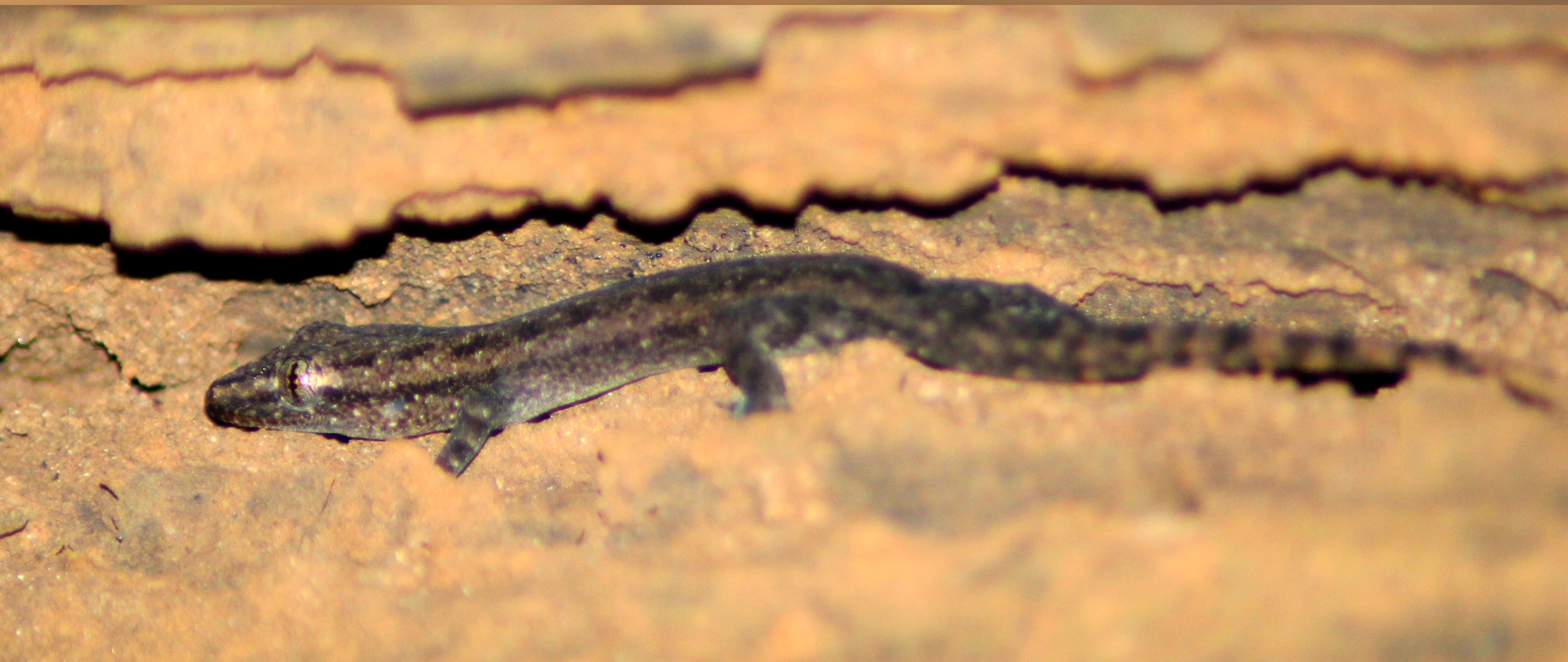
from Kandalama, Sri Lanka

While the common house gecko is mostly nocturnal, they also demonstrate quinodiurnal activity. This means that while they often hide during the daytime and forage at night, they also use the day to thermoregulate. An active form of this thermoregulation includes the presence of the gecko in lighter environments, proximal to cracks in the substrate. As such, there is a close relationship between activity levels and correlated air temperature. Timing of the circadian rhythm of the common house gecko is further impacted by light levels. This rhythm tends to involve the highest population presence around midnight, with highest activity levels just after sunset, with a gradual reduction until dawn. Daily cycle differences from place to place can generally be explained by environmental factors such as human interaction, and structural features. A peak in hunting activity after dark places them in an ideal spot to take advantage of invertebrate congregation around artificial lighting in the urban environment.

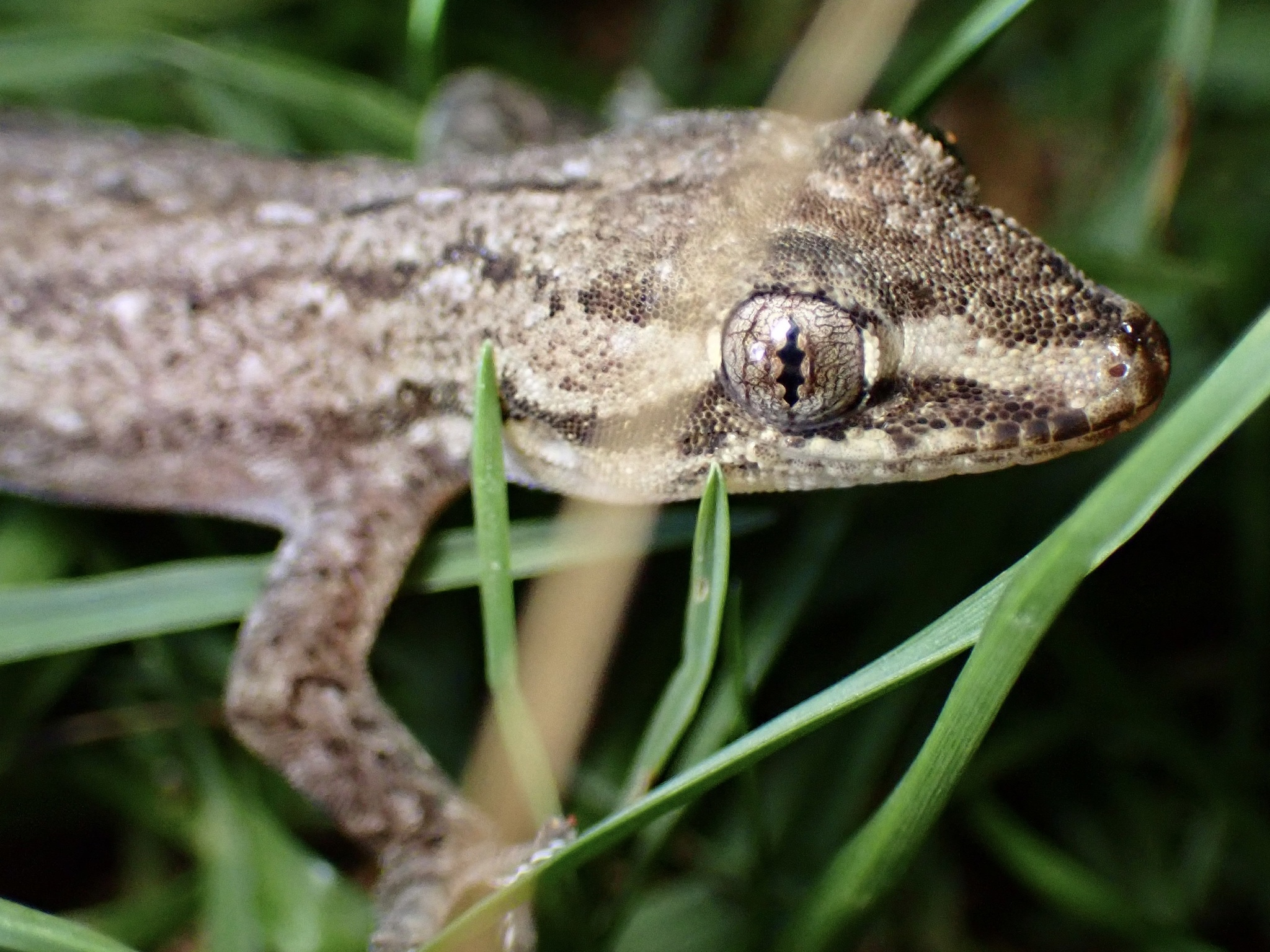
Common house gecko sitting on a blade of grass.

Due to this level of dependence on the environment, drops in temperature may act as a leading indicator for reduced gecko sightings in the medium term. Acute weather events such as rain or wind will result in acute decreases in Gecko sightings within that environment. It is unsure what impact these phenomena may have on the long term on distribution and the capacity of the common house gecko to compete with other gecko species.

There is some weak evidence, without statistically significant data, to suggest a trend toward higher temperature for females, which has an evolutionary advantage of increasing the speed of egg development.

Due to them being a species which is adapted for tropical or subtropical environments, there appear to be few physiological adaptations designed to prevent water loss. This may limit their capacity to thrive in arid or semi-arid environments.

== Reproductive biology ==
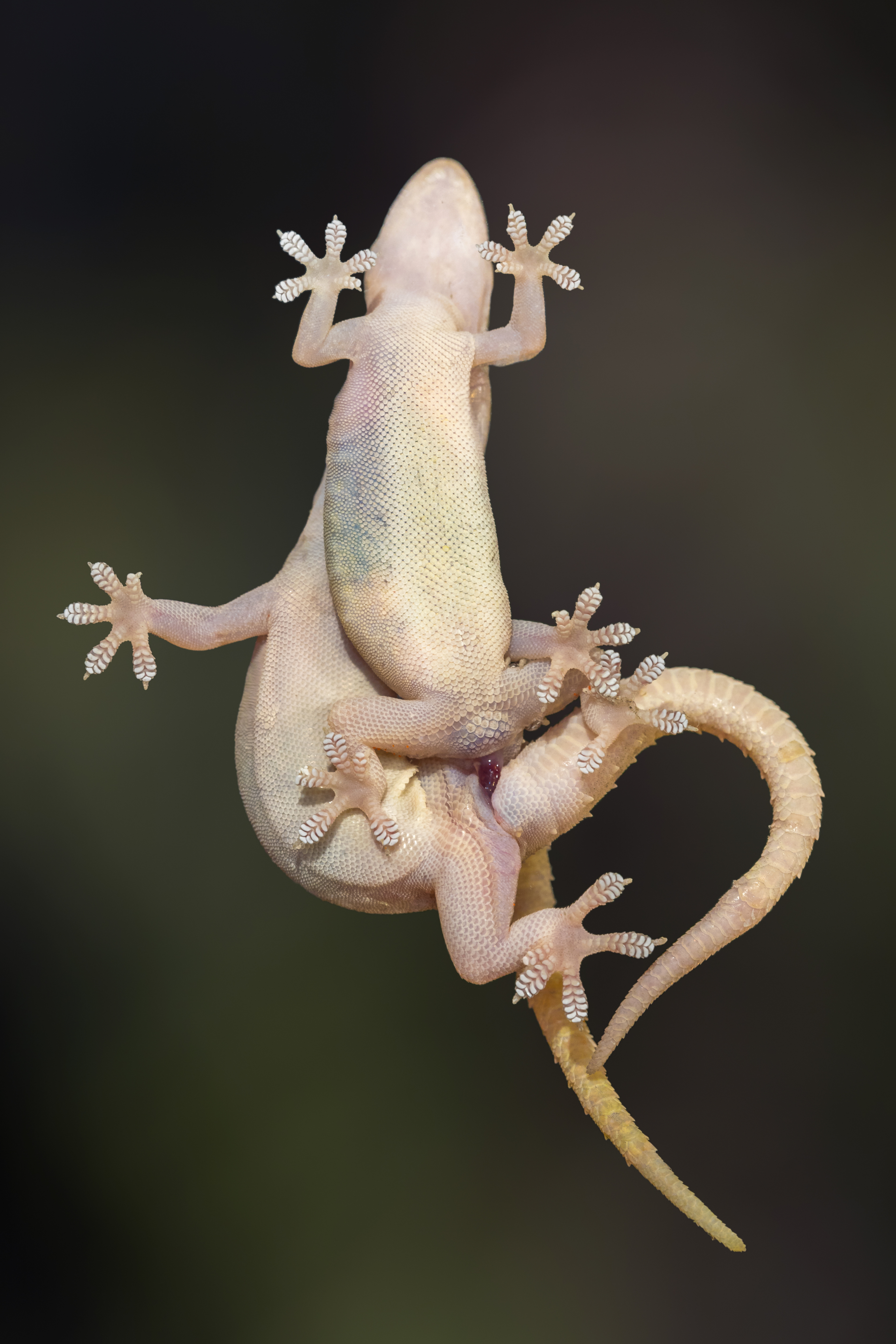
Ventral view of mating house geckos, with hemipenis inserted in the cloaca, and adhesive lamellae under the feet

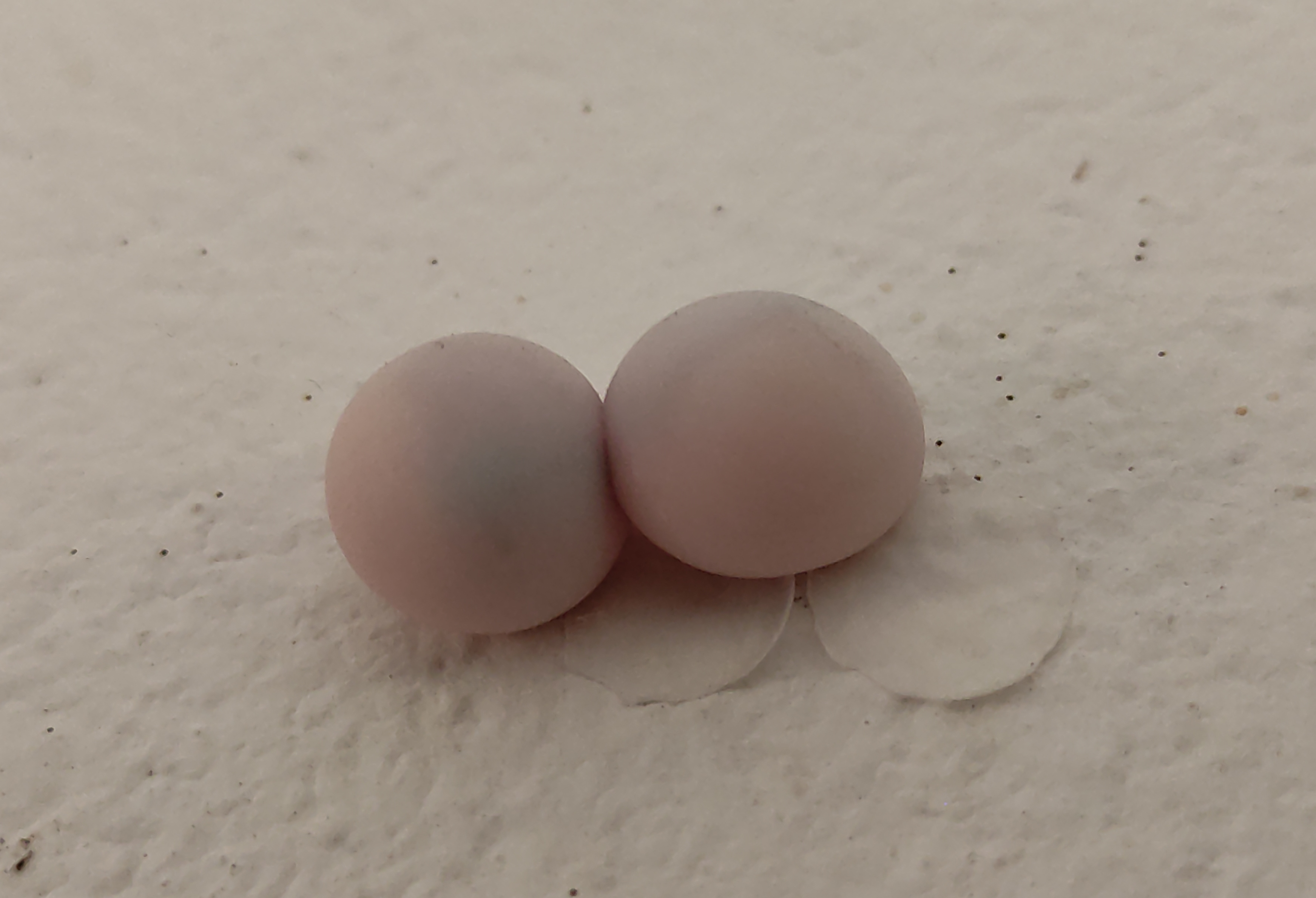
Hemidactylus frenatus eggs

H. frenatus has a similar gonad structure to the remainder of the gecko family. It is possible to differentiate the sex of larger common house geckos, with individuals which are larger than 40 mm (1.6 in) typically displaying differentiated gonads. Differentiated gonads are most clearly seen with a swelling at the entrance to the cloaca caused by the copulatory organs in males. Females lay a maximum of two hard-shelled eggs at any single time, with each descending from a single oviduct. Up to four eggs can exist within the ovaries in differing stages of development. This shortens the potential turn around between egg-laying events in gravid females. Females produce a single egg per ovary per cycle. This means they are considered monoautochronic ovulatory.

Within the testes, mature sperm are found in the male geckos year-round and are able to be stored within the oviduct of the female. Sperm can be stored for a period of time as long as 36 weeks. This provides a significantly increased chance of colonisation of new habitats, requiring smaller populations to be transplanted for a chance of success. Longer storage time of sperm within the female is associated with negative survival outcomes and hatching, possibly due to sperm age. Sperm is specifically stored between the uterine and infundibular components of the oviduct. The capacity to store sperm enables a degree of asynchrony between ovulation, copulation and laying of eggs. The capacity to store sperm is useful in island colonisation events, providing females which may be isolated the capacity to reproduce even if they have been separated from a male for some time. In laboratories, one mating event may produce as many as seven viable egg clutches. This eliminates the need for parthenogenesis and allows the young to include both male and female offspring, with one mating event leading to multiple clutches of eggs being laid. This reduced need for asexual reproduction increases the fitness of young through hybrid vigour and increased diversity. As well as this, sexually reproducing geckos are reported to be more robust and have higher survival rates than those which reproduce asexually.

There is a positive correlation between size and viability of eggs, with larger geckos having eggs which were more likely to survive. There is also a correlation between warmer year-round temperatures and consistent food supply with reproductive seasonality, with Geckos with constant food and temperatures being less likely to develop fat deposits on their stomach, and more likely to be constantly reproductive.

== Genetics ==
Two distinct karyotypes of the common house gecko appear to exist, one with 40 chromosomes and one with 46 chromosomes. This could be explained through an intraspecific variation of karyotype, or the possibility of two distinct species being misidentified. Morphological analysis seems particularly congruent with the suggestion that they indeed are different species. Taxonomic revision may be required as a greater understanding of phylogenetic trees and population structures is developed.

== Captivity ==
House geckos can be kept as pets in a vivarium with a clean substrate, and typically require a heat source and a place to hide in order to regulate their body temperature, and a system of humidifiers and plants to provide them with moisture.

The species will cling to vertical or even inverted surfaces when at rest. In a terrarium they will mostly be at rest on the sides or on the top cover rather than placing themselves on plants, decorations or on the substrate, thus being rather conspicuous.

== Cultural beliefs ==
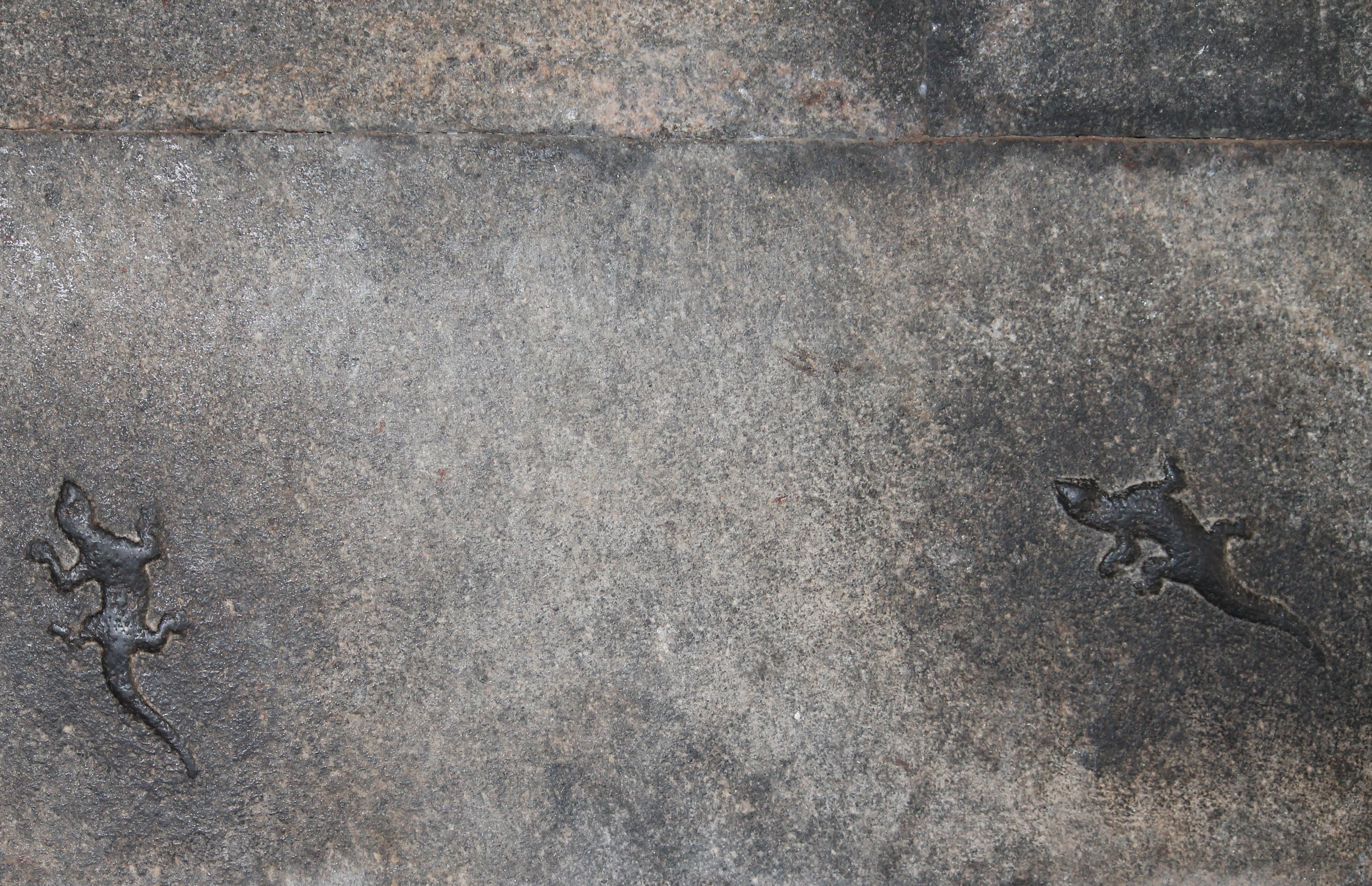
Two wall sculptures of geckos on the wall of the Mandapam of the Siva temple inside Vellore Fort, Tamil Nadu, India (2012)

In the Philippines, geckos making a ticking sound are believed to indicate an imminent arrival of a visitor or a letter. But in Thailand, if a common house gecko chirps when someone leaves the house, that's a bad omen. In Thai idioms, it is called "greeting gecko".

An elaborate system of predicting good and bad omens based on the sounds made by geckos, their movement and the rare instances when geckos fall from roofs has evolved over centuries in India. In some parts of India, the sound made by geckos is considered a bad omen; while in parts of India, Assam, Odisha, West Bengal, Bangladesh and Nepal, it is considered to be an endorsement of the truthfulness of a statement made just before, because the sound "tik tik tik" resembles the expression "thik thik thik" (Assamese: ঠিক ঠিক ঠিক), which in many Indian languages (e.g. Bengali and Assamese) means "correct correct correct", i.e., a three-fold confirmation. The cry of a gecko from an east wall as one is about to embark on a journey is considered auspicious, but a cry from any other wall is supposed to be inauspicious. A gecko falling on someone's right shoulder is considered good omen, but a bad omen if it falls on the left shoulder. In Punjab, it is believed that contact with the urine of a gecko will cause leprosy. In some places in India, it is believed that watching a lizard on the eve of Dhanteras is a good omen or a sign of prosperity.

In Sri Lanka, it's believed that it's inauspicious if a gecko makes a sound while someone is going out of the house. And there is an art of divination based on a gecko falling onto one's body, with the different body parts indicating different predictions. This art of divination can be observed throughout the Indian subcontinent.

== Sources ==
- Cook, Robert A. 1990 Range extension of the Darwin house gecko, Hemidactylus frenatus. Herpetofauna (Sydney) 20 (1): 23–27
- Darevsky, I S; Kupriyanova, L A; Roshchin, V V (1984). "A new all-female triploid species of gecko and karyological data on the bisexual Hemidactylus frenatus from Vietnam". Journal of Herpetology. 18 (3): 277–284. doi:10.2307/1564081. JSTOR 1564081.
- Edgren, Richard A (1950). "Notes on the Neotropical population of Hemidactylus frenatus". Schlegel Natural History Miscellanea. 55: 1–3.
- Jerdon, T.C. (1853). "Catalogue of the Reptiles inhabiting the Peninsula of India. Part 1". J. Asiat. Soc. Bengal. xxii: 462–479.
- McCoy, C. J.; Busack, Stephen D. (1970). "The lizards Hemidactylus frenatus and Leiolopisma metallica on the Island of Hawaii". Herpetologica. 26 (3): 303.
- Norman, Bradford R (2003). "A new geographical record for the introduced house gecko, Hemidactylus frenatus, at Cabo San Lucas, Baja California Sur, Mexico, with notes on other species observed". Bulletin of the Chicago Herpetological Society. 38 (5): 98–100. [erratum in 38(7):145]
- Ota, H. (1989). "Hemidactylus okinawensis Okada, 1936, a Junior Synonym of H. Frenatus Duméril et Bibron, 1836". Journal of Herpetology. 23 (4): 444–445. doi:10.2307/1564064. JSTOR 1564064.
- Saenz, Daniel; Klawinski, Paul D (1996). "Geographic Distribution. Hemidactylus frenatus". Herpetological Review. 27 (1): 32.
