= Georges Foucart =

French historian and Egyptologist

Georges Foucart (11 December 1865, in Paris – 1943) was a French historian and Egyptologist. He was the son of archaeologist Paul Foucart (1836–1926), a professor of ancient Greek studies at the Collège de France.

From 1898 to 1906, he was a professor of ancient history at the University of Bordeaux, afterwards serving as a professor of history of religions at Aix-Marseille University. From 1915 to 1928, he was director of the Institut Français d'Archéologie Orientale in Cairo.

== Selected works ==
- La religion et l'art dans l'Egypte ancienne, 1908 – Religion and art of ancient Egypt.
- Histoire des religions et méthode comparative, 1912 – History of religions and comparative methods.
- Questionnaire preĺiminaire d'ethnologie africaine, translated into English and published as "Introductory questions on African ethnology", Cairo, Print. Office of the French Institute of Oriental Archaeology", 1919.
- La Société sultanieh de géographie du Caire; son oeuvre (1875-1921), Le Caire, Impr. de l'Institut français d'archéologie orientale, 1921. (with Adolphe bey Cattaui).
- Tombes thébaines, nécropole de Dirâ ̀Abû'n-Nága, Le Caire, Imprimerie de l'Institut Français d'Archéologie Orientale, 1928 (with Marcelle Baud) – Theban tombs, the necropolis of Dirâ ̀Abû'n-Nága.
- Le tombeau de Roÿ, 1928 (with Marcelle Baud; Etienne Drioton).
- Le tombeau de Panehsy, 1932 (with Marcelle Baud; Etienne Drioton) – The tomb of Panehesy.
- Le tombeau d'Amonmos, 1935 (with Marcelle Baud; Etienne Drioton) – The tomb of Amenmose.

In addition to his works on ancient Egypt, he published a few treatises associated with Madagascar, e.g.: Le commerce et la colonisation à Madagascar (1894).
