= Paul Foucart =

French archaeologist (1836–1926)

Paul-François Foucart (15 March 1836, in Paris – 19 May 1926) was a French archaeologist, known for his research involving the Eleusinian Mysteries. He was the father of Egyptologist Georges Foucart.

Beginning in 1855 he studied at the École Normale Supérieure in Paris, obtaining his agrégation in 1858. Afterwards, he taught classes at the Lycée Charlemagne (from 1865) and at the Lycée Bonaparte (from 1868). In 1874 he became a lecturer at Collège de France, where in 1877 he was appointed professor of epigraphy and Greek antiquities. In 1878 he was elected a member of the Académie des Inscriptions et Belles Lettres, replacing Joseph Naudet, and during the same year, was named director of the French School at Athens.

== Selected works ==
- Mémoire sur les ruines et l'histoire de Delphes, 1865 – Memoire on the ruins and history of Delphi.
- Des associations religieuses chez les Grecs, thiases, éranes, orgéons, 1875 – Religious associations among the Greeks.
- Décret des Athéniens relatif à la ville de Chalcis, 1877 – Decree of the Athenians on the city of Chalcis.
- Mélanges d'épigraphie grecque, 1878 – Melanges of Greek epigraphy.
- Recherches sur l'origine et la nature des mystères d'Éleusis, 1895 – Research on the origin and nature of the mysteries of Eleusis.
- Les grands mystères d'Éleusis, personnel--cérémonies, 1900 – The grand mysteries of Eleusis.
- La formation de la Province Romaine d'Asie, 1903 – The formation of the Roman province of Asia.
- Le culte de Dionysos en Attique, 1904 – The Cult of Dionysus in Attica.
- Étude sur Didymos d'après un papyrus de Berlin, 1906 – Study of Didymus according to the papyrus at Berlin.
- Les mystères d'Éleusis, 1914 – The mysteries of Eleusis.
- Le culte des héros chez les Grecs, 1918 – Hero worship among the Greeks.
