= Bavay (surname) =

Bavay is a French surname. Notable people by that name include:

- Arthur René Jean Baptiste Bavay (1840–1923), French pharmacist, herpetologist and malacologist
- Laurent Bavay (born 1972), Belgian Egyptologist

== See also ==
- Bavay, a French commune.
