= Abdelfattah al-Banna =

Egyptian politician

Previously Nominated Minister of Antiquities

Personal details
- Born: Kingdom of Egypt

Abdelfattah al-Banna is a professor and stone monuments restoration specialist.

== Biography ==
He obtained his Ph.D. from Warsaw University in Engineering Geology and majored in restoration of historic buildings. He was engaged in studying the deterioration phenomena, their effective factors and treatments by the consolidation techniques of Karnak Temple at Luxor.

He was appointed as a restoration consultant in the Engineering Center for Archaeology & Environment, Faculty of Engineering, Cairo University, 1999. In addition, he shared the Risk Analysis Consultant position at the Egyptian Antiquities Information System (EAIS), North South Consultants Exchange (NSCE), Supreme Council of Antiquities (SCA), 2003. For the time being he was appointed as the vice director of the Centre of Monuments Conservation, Manuscripts and Museum Objects.

In July 2011, he was appointed as Egypt's Minister of Antiquities. He was one of many new appointments announced by Prime Minister at the time, Essam Sharaf. He was nominated for Minister of Antiquities (Egypt) and days later withdrew his nomination.
