= Institut Français d'Archéologie Orientale =

French research institute based in Cairo, Egypt

Coordinates: 30.033293°N 31.234993°E

Institut français d'archéologie orientale
- The double lion logo of the Institut Français d'Archéologie Orientale
- Founder: Jules Ferry
- Established: 1880
- Director: Laurent Bavay
- Location: Egypt
- Interactive map of Institut français d'archéologie orientale
- Website: www.ifao.egnet.net

The Institut français d'archéologie orientale (or IFAO), also known as the French Institute for Oriental Archaeology in Cairo, is a French research institute based in Cairo, Egypt, dedicated to the study of the archaeology, history and languages of the various periods of Egypt's civilisation.

The IFAO is under the authority of the French Ministry for National Education.

The Institute conducts archaeological excavations and also publishes a number of books and journals most notably Bulletin de l'Institut Français d'Archéologie Orientale or BIFAO which this French institution has published annually since 1901.

The Institute houses a library with over 80 000 volumes, including a copy of the Description de l'Égypte. It also maintains an archives department, established in 1972, which preserves administrative, material, and scientific records from all of the Institute’s projects, as well as a vast collection of historical photographs.

== History ==
The IFAO was created on 28 December 1880 by a signed decree of the French Minister of Public Instruction and Fine Arts Jules Ferry, which created a permanent Mission in Cairo, intended as a counterpart in Egypt of the French School at Athens (Ecole française d'Athènes) and French School of Rome (Ecole française de Rome), under the name of French School of Cairo (École française du Caire).

The School adopted its current name of Institut Français d’Archéologie Orientale in 1898. In 1907, the IFAO moved into Mounira Palace. In 1929, a restoration of the building is undertaken, which includes the replacement of the art nouveau decoration on the façade with neo-classical.

Since February 2011, the IFAO has been a part of the network, Écoles françaises à l’étranger (EFE), made of five higher education and research establishments. The other four establishments are École française d'Athènes (French School in Athens), École française de Rome (French School in Rome), École française d’Extrême-Orient (French School of the Far East), and Casa de Velázquez, Madrid.

== Administration ==
=== Directors ===
- 1880–1881: Gaston Maspero
- 1881–1883: Eugène Lefébure
- 1883–1886: Eugène Grébaut
- 1886–1898: Urbain Bouriant
- 1898–1912: Émile Chassinat
- 1912 Mgr Louis Duchesne
- 1912–1914: Pierre Lacau
- 1914–1928: Georges Foucart
- 1928–1940: Pierre Jouguet
- 1940–1953: Charles Kuentz
- 1953–1959: Jean Sainte-Fare Garnot
- 1959–1969: François Daumas
- 1969–1976: Serge Sauneron
- 1977–1981: Jean Vercoutter
- 1981–1989: Paule Posener-Kriéger
- 1989–1999: Nicolas Grimal
- 1999–2005: Bernard Mathieu
- 2005–2010: Laure Pantalacci
- 2010–2015: Béatrix Midant-Reynes
- 2015–2019: Laurent Bavay
- 2019-2023: Laurent Coulon
- Since 2023:Pierre Tallet

=== Head of Scientific and Technical Relations ===
- Jean-Pierre Corteggiani

== Recent IFAO archaeological excavations ==
This section originally from French Wikipedia article: Fouille archéologique en Égypte

- Abu Roash, directed by Michel Baud

25 March - 28 April 2004 (10th expedition)

- Adaima

1 November - 15 December 2003 (15th expedition)

- 'Ayn-Manawir (Kharga Oasis)

4 October - 28 December 2003
7 October 2005 - 7 January 2006

- 'Ayn Soukhna, in collaboration with the Egyptian Supreme Council of Antiquities

4 January - 8 February 2004

- Bahariya Oasis, directed by Frederic Hake

27 March - 18 May 2004

- Balat ('Ayn-Asil, Dakhla Oasis)

20 December 2003 - 4 May 2004

- Baouit

11–29 September 2003

- Cairo, on the Ayyoubide Wall (mediaeval)

12 April - 12 June 2003
7 October - 22 November 2003
26 April - 15 June 2004

- Deir el-Bahri, with Nathalie Beaux-Grimal
- Deir el-Medina
- Dendera, conducted by Sylvie Cauville

27 September - 25 October 2003

- Ermant (temple of Montu), by Christophe Tiers

12–15 December 2003

- Karnak-North (Treasury of Thutmose I)

November 2003 - February 2004

- Ouadi Sannour, directed by François Briois and Béatrix Midant-Reynes

2014 to present

- Qal' At Al-Guindi

17 February-6 March 2004

- the temple of Qasr Al-Aguz

April 2001, carried out by Pr Claude Traunecker (1st expedition)
10 April 2004 - 29 April 2004 (4th expedition)

- Saqqara-South, directed by Vassil Dobrev

8 October 2003 - 30 December 2003

- Tebtunis (in the Fayum), joint mission with the University of Milan

1994 (1st expedition)
25 August - 30 October 2003

- in the area of Aïn Soukhna, joint with the University Paris IV-Sorbonne
- Tanis
- Tinnîs, in collaboration with the British expedition of the University of Cambridge

5–17 April 2004

- El Tôd, carried out by Christophe Thiers (6th expedition)

15 November - 11 December 2003

- Tuna el-Gebel (Tomb of Petosiris), by Jean-Pierre Corteggiani

== Publications ==
Cover of Le Bulletin de l'Institut Français d'Archéologie Orientale (BIFAO), Vol.103 (2003).

The Institute has a library containing more than 80,000 volumes, and also publishes a variety of books and journals. The IFAO's scientific members belong to two sections: the first studies ancient Egyptian and papyrological matters, while the second studies the Coptic and Islamic periods.

Journals and book series of the IFAO include:

- Annales islamologiques (AnIsl)
- Bibliothèque d'études
- Bulletin critique des Annales islamologiques (BCAI)
- Bulletin de la céramique égyptienne (BCE)
- Bulletin de l'Institut Français d'Archéologie Orientale (BIFAO webpage on IFAO)
- Cahiers des Annales islamologiques (CAI)
- Cahiers de la céramique égyptienne (CCE)
- Documents de fouilles de l'Institut français d'archéologie orientale (DFIFAO)
- Études alexandrines
- Études urbaines
- Fouilles de l'Institut français d'archéologie orientale (FIFAO)
- Mémoires publiés par les membres de l'Institut français d'archéologie orientale (MIFAO)
- Mémoires publiés par les membres de la Mission archéologique française du Caire (MMAF)
- Paléographie hiéroglyphique
- Publications du Service des antiquités de l'Égypte et de l'Ifao (PIFAO)
- Recherches d'archéologie, de philologie et d'histoire (RAPH)
- Répertoire chronologique d'épigraphie arabe (RCEA)
- Textes arabes et études islamiques
- Temples ptolémaïques
- Textes et traductions d'auteurs orientaux (TTA)
- Voyageurs occidentaux en Égypte
- ICE XII Proceedings of the Twelfth International Congress of Egyptologists 3rd– 8th November 2019 Cairo, Egypt I ARCHAEOLOGY, CURRENT METHODS AND FIELD WORK (editors: Ola el-Aguizy & Burt Kasparian), Institut Français d'Archéologie Orientale (IFAO), 343 pages, 2019
- ICE XII Proceedings of the Twelfth International Congress of Egyptologists 3rd– 8th November 2019 Cairo, Egypt II ART AND ARCHITECTURE (editors: Ola el-Aguizy & Burt Kasparian), Institut Français d'Archéologie Orientale (IFAO), 201 pages, 2019
- ICE XII Proceedings of the Twelfth International Congress of Egyptologists 3rd– 8th November 2019 Cairo, Egypt III SITE MANAGEMENT, CONSERVATION, PRESERVATION (editors: Ola el-Aguizy & Burt Kasparian), Institut Français d'Archéologie Orientale (IFAO), 21 pages, 2019
- ICE XII Proceedings of the Twelfth International Congress of Egyptologists 3rd– 8th November 2019 Cairo, Egypt IV HISTORY (editors: Ola el-Aguizy & Burt Kasparian), Institut Français d'Archéologie Orientale (IFAO), 67 pages, 2019
- ICE XII Proceedings of the Twelfth International Congress of Egyptologists 3rd– 8th November 2019 Cairo, Egypt V VIEWS ON THE EGYPTIAN PAST (editors: Ola el-Aguizy & Burt Kasparian), Institut Français d'Archéologie Orientale (IFAO), 55 pages, 2019
- ICE XII Proceedings of the Twelfth International Congress of Egyptologists 3rd– 8th November 2019 Cairo, Egypt VI LANGUAGE, LITERATURE AND TEXTS (editors: Ola el-Aguizy & Burt Kasparian), Institut Français d'Archéologie Orientale (IFAO), 213 pages, 2019
- ICE XII Proceedings of the Twelfth International Congress of Egyptologists 3rd– 8th November 2019 Cairo, Egypt VII ARCHAEOLOGICAL SCIENCE AND TECHNOLOGY (editors: Ola el-Aguizy & Burt Kasparian), Institut Français d'Archéologie Orientale (IFAO), 43 pages, 2019
- ICE XII Proceedings of the Twelfth International Congress of Egyptologists 3rd– 8th November 2019 Cairo, Egypt VIII MUSEUMS AND COLLECTIONS (editors: Ola el-Aguizy & Burt Kasparian), Institut Français d'Archéologie Orientale (IFAO), 75 pages, 2019
- ICE XII Proceedings of the Twelfth International Congress of Egyptologists 3rd– 8th November 2019 Cairo, Egypt IX RELIGIOUS THOUGHTS (editors: Ola el-Aguizy & Burt Kasparian), Institut Français d'Archéologie Orientale (IFAO), 197 pages, 2019
- ICE XII Proceedings of the Twelfth International Congress of Egyptologists 3rd– 8th November 2019 Cairo, Egypt X SOCIAL LIFE IN ANCIENT EGYPT (editors: Ola el-Aguizy & Burt Kasparian), Institut Français d'Archéologie Orientale (IFAO), 24 pages, 2019
