= Béatrix Midant-Reynes =

French egyptologist

Béatrix Midant-Reynes is a French Egyptologist who was director of the Institut français d'archéologie orientale from 2010 to 2015. In 2004, Midant-Reynes won the Diane Potier-Boès Award for her work on the origins of Egypt. Midant-Reynes currently co-directs archaeological work at Wadi Sannur. She previously also was director of archaeological work at Tell el-Iswid from 2006 to 2016, Kom el-Khilgan from 2002 to 2005, co-director at Adaïma from 1989 to 2005, co-director at Maghar-Dendera in 1987. She was also responsible for the publication of the lithic material at the Ain Asil site, Dakhla Oasis.

== Publications ==
- Felsbilder Nubiens : Verhältnis zu den prädynastischen Kulturen Ägyptens, 1974
- Les gestes de l'artisan égyptien, 1981
- Le nain de Pount, 1990
- Préhistoire de l'Egypte : des premiers hommes aux premiers pharaons, 1992
- Ouserrê, prince du Nil, 1992
- La gestion de l'eau dans l'Égypte ancienne, 1994
- Léau et le pouvoir, 1995
- Sources et acquisition des matières premières, 1997
- Le silex de Àyn-Aṣ-il : oasis de Dakhla-Balat, 1998
- Les questions de chronologie, 1999
- The prehistory of Egypt : from the first Egyptians to the first pharaohs, 2000 {Review}
- Le sacrifice humain en contexte funéraire, 2000
- L'invention de l'écriture, 2001
- Adaïma, 2002
- Economie et habitat, 2002
- Aux origines de l'Égypte : du Néolithique à la naissance de l'État, 2003
- L'Égypte et ses voisins aux 5e et 4e millénaire, 2004
- L'Egypte des premiers pharaons : dossier, 2004
- L'Egypte prédynastique, 2005
- Les civilisations préhistoriques du Soudan ancien. Hommage à Francis Geus, 2006
- Portraits : les pionniers de la préhistoire en Égypte, 2007
- La naissance de l'architecture funéraire, 2008
