= Eugène Grébaut =

French Egyptologist (1846–1915)

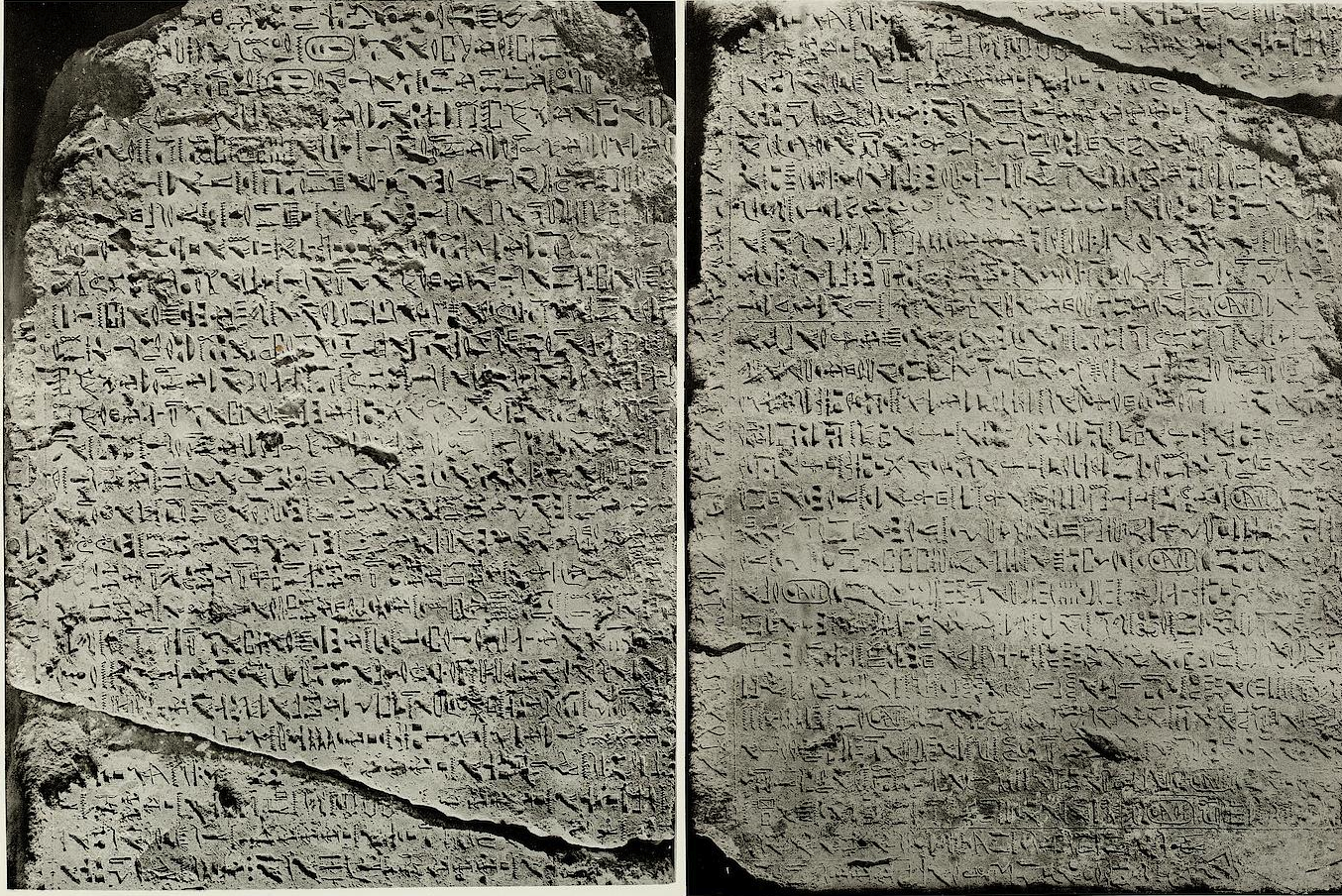
Autobiography of Weni, from Abydos, now at the Egyptian Museum in Cairo

Eugène Grébaut (1846 – 8 January 1915) was a French Egyptologist. Grébaut made significant discoveries in the complex of mortuary temples and tombs located at Deir el-Bahari including several Egyptian mummies of the twenty-first Dynasty.

In 1883, he succeeded Eugène Lefébure as a director of the Institut Français d'Archéologie Orientale in Cairo. Three years later, he succeeded Gaston Maspero as the director of the Département des antiquités égyptiennes, a position he maintained up until 1892. Afterwards, he worked as a lecturer of ancient history at the Sorbonne in Paris.

He was the author of "Hymne à Ammon-Ra des papyrus égyptiens du Musée de Boulaq" (1874).

Grébaut was one of the people working on clearing the sands from around the Great Sphinx. "In the beginning of the year 1887, the chest, the paws, the altar, and the plateau were all made visible. Flights of steps were unearthed, and finally accurate measurements were taken of the great figures. The height from the lowest of the steps was found to be one hundred feet, and the space between the paws was found to be thirty-five feet long and ten feet wide. Here there was formerly an altar; and a stele of Thûtmosis IV was discovered, recording a dream in which he was ordered to clear away the sand that even then was gathering round the site of the Sphinx."
