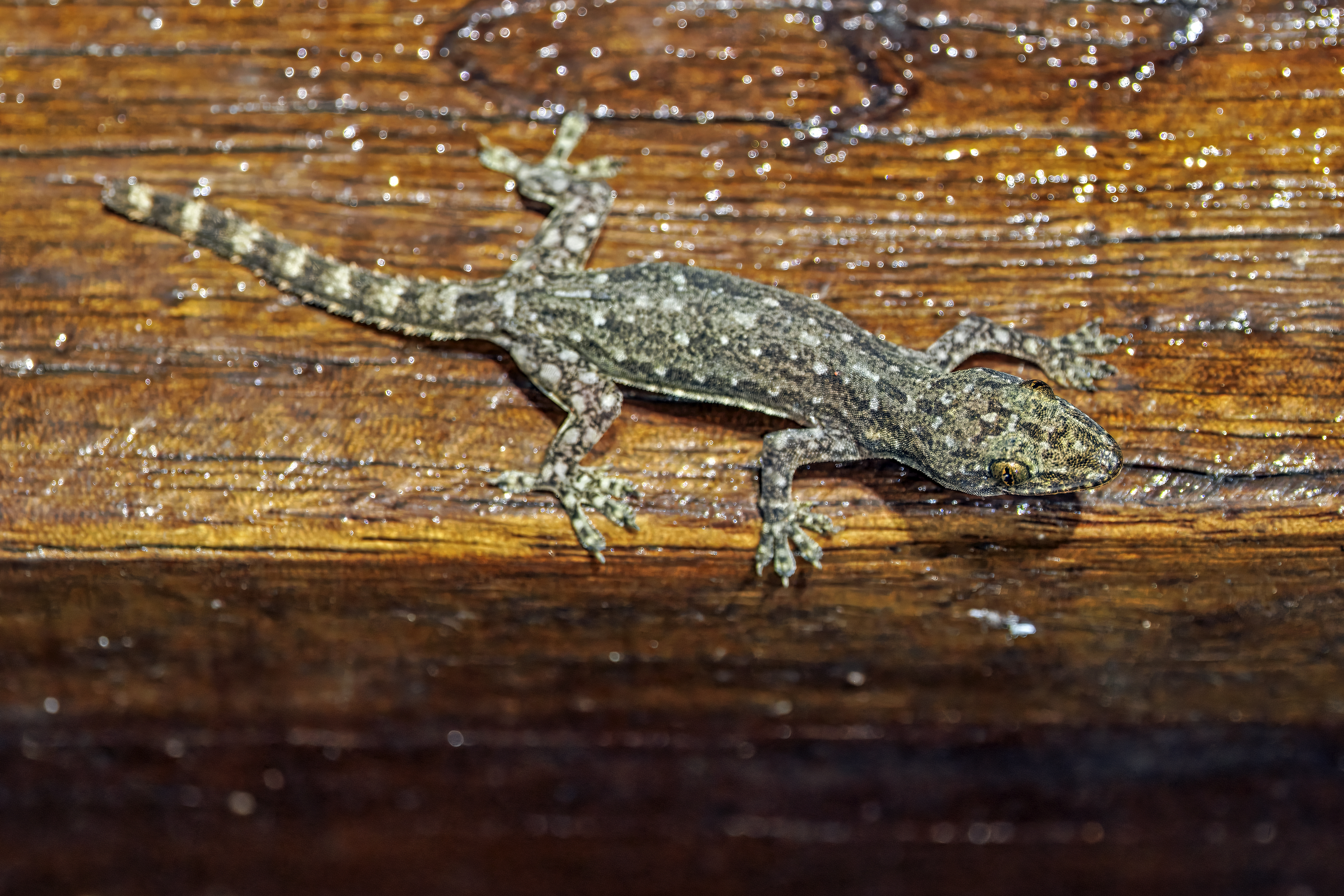

Conservation status
- Least Concern (IUCN 3.1)

Scientific classification
- Kingdom: Animalia
- Phylum: Chordata
- Class: Reptilia
- Order: Squamata
- Suborder: Gekkota
- Family: Gekkonidae
- Genus: Hemidactylus
- Species: H. garnotii

Binomial name
- Hemidactylus garnotii A.M.C. Duméril and Bibron, 1836

Synonyms
- Hemidactylus garnotii A.M.C. Duméril & Bibron, 1836; Hoplodion garnotii — Fitzinger, 1843; Doryura garnotii — Gray, 1845; Hemidactylus garnotii — Boulenger, 1885; Lepidodactylus garnotii — Henshaw, 1902; Hemidactylus garnoti [sic] — de Rooij, 1915; Hemidactylus garnotii — Conant & Collins, 1991

= Indo-Pacific gecko =

Species of reptile

The Indo-Pacific gecko (Hemidactylus garnotii), also known as Garnot's house gecko, fox gecko, or the Assam greyish-brown gecko, is a species of gecko native to South and Southeast Asia, Polynesia, and the east coast of Australia.

Adults grow to about 10–13 cm (4–5 in) in length. Similar to H. frenatus, they exhibit the ability to change the colour of their skin, from dark gray or brown with light markings in daylight, to a pale, translucent colour at night. Often mistaken for a common house gecko, the species can be distinguished by its rows of large, spiny scales on the lateral edges of the tail.

== Etymology ==
The species epithet, garnotii, is named in honor of the French naturalist Prosper Garnot. The name gecko is onomatopoeic, in reference to the chirp of H. frenatus, one of three extant relatives of H. garnotii, which has historically been interpreted as a "gecko, gecko" sound. The common name fox gecko relates to the species' long, narrow snout, similar to that of a fox.

== Description ==
The Indo-Pacific gecko bears a striking resemblance to its extant cousin H. frenatus, its closest relative. However, individuals of H. garnotii tend to be much larger than H. frenatus, with more prevalent markings on the back. The belly of H. garnotii is usually a pale yellow or orange. It also bears two large, spiky rows of scales, one along each side of its tail. These scales are soft, and are the same colour as the tail. Their purpose is unknown.

== Reproduction ==
H. garnotii reproduces solely through parthenogenesis, with all individuals being female. Like all reptiles, H. garnotii lays eggs, but because it is parthenogenetic, the eggs can hatch without the need for male fertilization.

== Geographic range ==
The Indo-Pacific gecko is native to South and Southeast Asia, Polynesia, and Australia's east coast. It can also be found in Remote Oceania (particularly New Zealand, Hawaii, and Fiji), Seychelles, the Bahamas, and tropical United States. In the U.S. states of Hawaii, Florida, and Georgia, it is considered an invasive species. In Australia, the Indo-Pacific gecko has only a few populations, though they are well-established. They can particularly be found in Sydney and Fraser Coast.

== Gallery ==
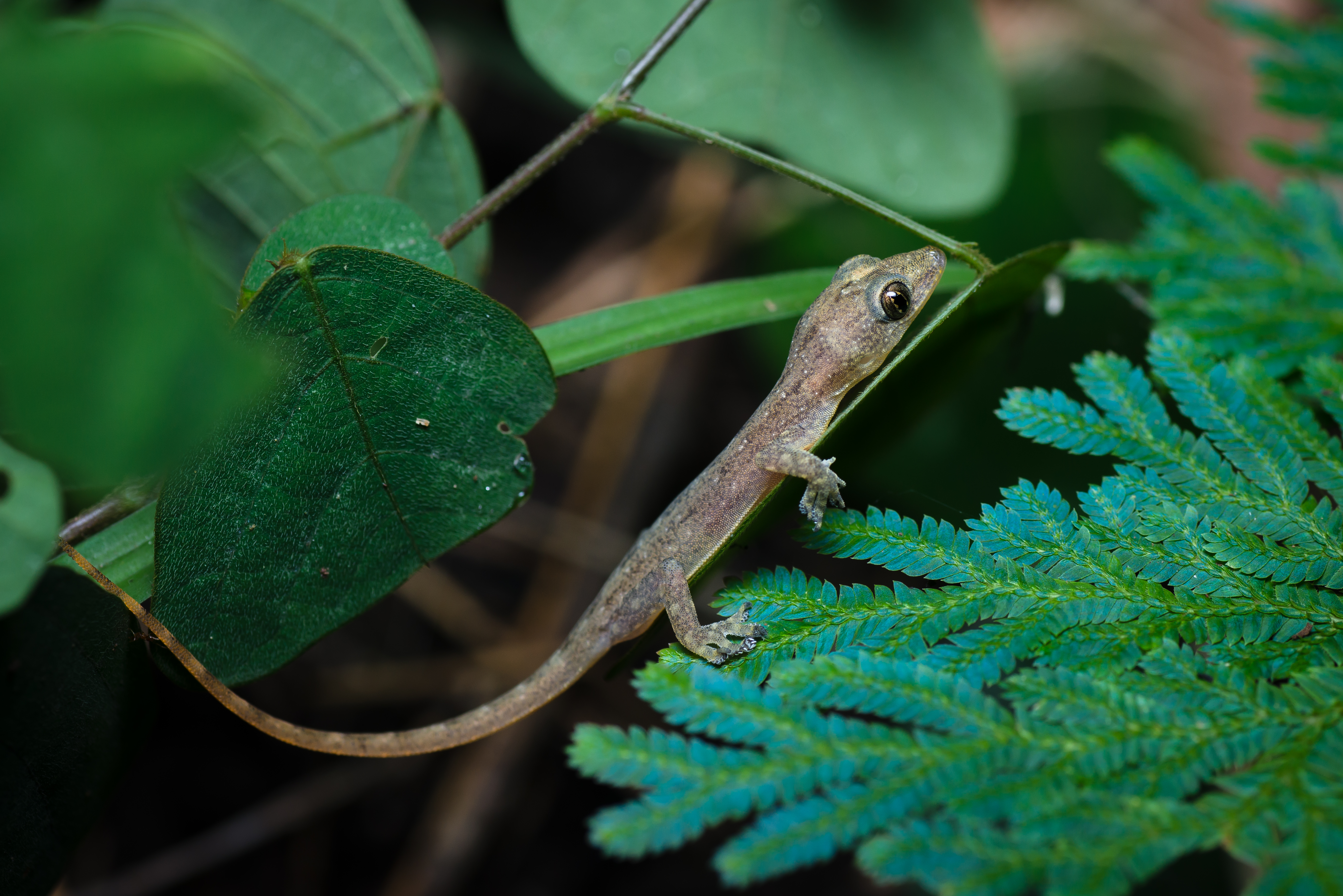
Hemidactylus garnotii, Garnot's house gecko – Nam Nao National Park
