= François Daumas =

French archeologist and Egyptologist

François Felix Eugene Daumas (3 January 1915 - 6 October 1984) was a French Egyptologist who was director of the Institut français d'archéologie orientale from 1959 to 1969.
