= Jean Sainte-Fare Garnot =

French Egyptologist (1908–1963)

Portrait of Jean Sainte-Fare Garnot

Jean Sainte-Fare Garnot (26 July 1908 – 20 June 1963) was a French Egyptologist. He was director of the Institut français d'archéologie orientale from 1953 to 1959, professor in Sorbonne, director of studies at the École pratique des hautes études, president of the French society of Egyptology and correspondent of the Académie des Inscriptions et Belles-Lettres.

He was the father of Nicolas Sainte-Fare Garnot, curator of the Musée Jacquemart-André from 1993 till 2015, and the grandfather of Florent Sainte-Fare Garnot, mayor of Nevers from 2010 till 2014.

== Biography ==
Son of painter Georges Sainte Fare Garnot (1868-1928), Jean Sainte Fare Garnot was director of the Institut Français d'Archéologie Orientale du Caire (IFAO) from 1953 to 1959, professor at the Sorbonne, director of studies at the École pratique des hautes études, president of the Société française d'égyptologie and correspondent of the Académie des Inscriptions et Belles-Lettres.

He is the father of Nicolas Sainte Fare Garnot, curator of the Musée Jacquemart-André from 1993 to 2015, and the grandfather of Florent Sainte Fare Garnot, mayor of Nevers from 2010 to 2014.
