= Prosper Garnot =

French surgeon and naturalist (1794–1838)

- Born: 13 January 1794; Brest, France
- Died: 8 October 1838 (aged 44); Paris
- Known for: Voyage autour du monde exécuté par order du roi sur la corvette La Coquille
- Scientific career
- Fields: Surgeon and naturalist
- Author abbrev. (zoology): Garnot

Prosper Garnot (13 January 1794 – 8 October 1838) was a French surgeon and naturalist.

Garnot was born at Brest. He was an assistant surgeon under Louis Isidore Duperrey on La Coquille during its circumnavigation of the globe (1822–1825). Along with René Primevère Lesson he collected numerous natural history specimens in South America and the Pacific. Garnot had a severe attack of dysentery and was sent back with some of the collection on the Castle Forbes. The specimens were lost when the ship was wrecked off the Cape of Good Hope in July 1824. With Lesson he wrote the zoological section of the voyage's report, Voyage autour du monde exécuté par order du roi sur la corvette La Coquille (1828–1832). He died, aged 44, in Paris.

The widely distributed parthenogenetic Indo-Pacific house gecko Hemidactylus garnotii A.M.C. Duméril & Bibron, 1836, was named in his honour.

== Literature ==
- Levot, Prosper Jean (1856). "Biographie de Prosper Garnot ". Revue des Provinces de l'Ouest 4: 466–467. online (in French).
