= Supreme Council of Antiquities =

1994–2011 branch of the Egyptian Ministry of Culture

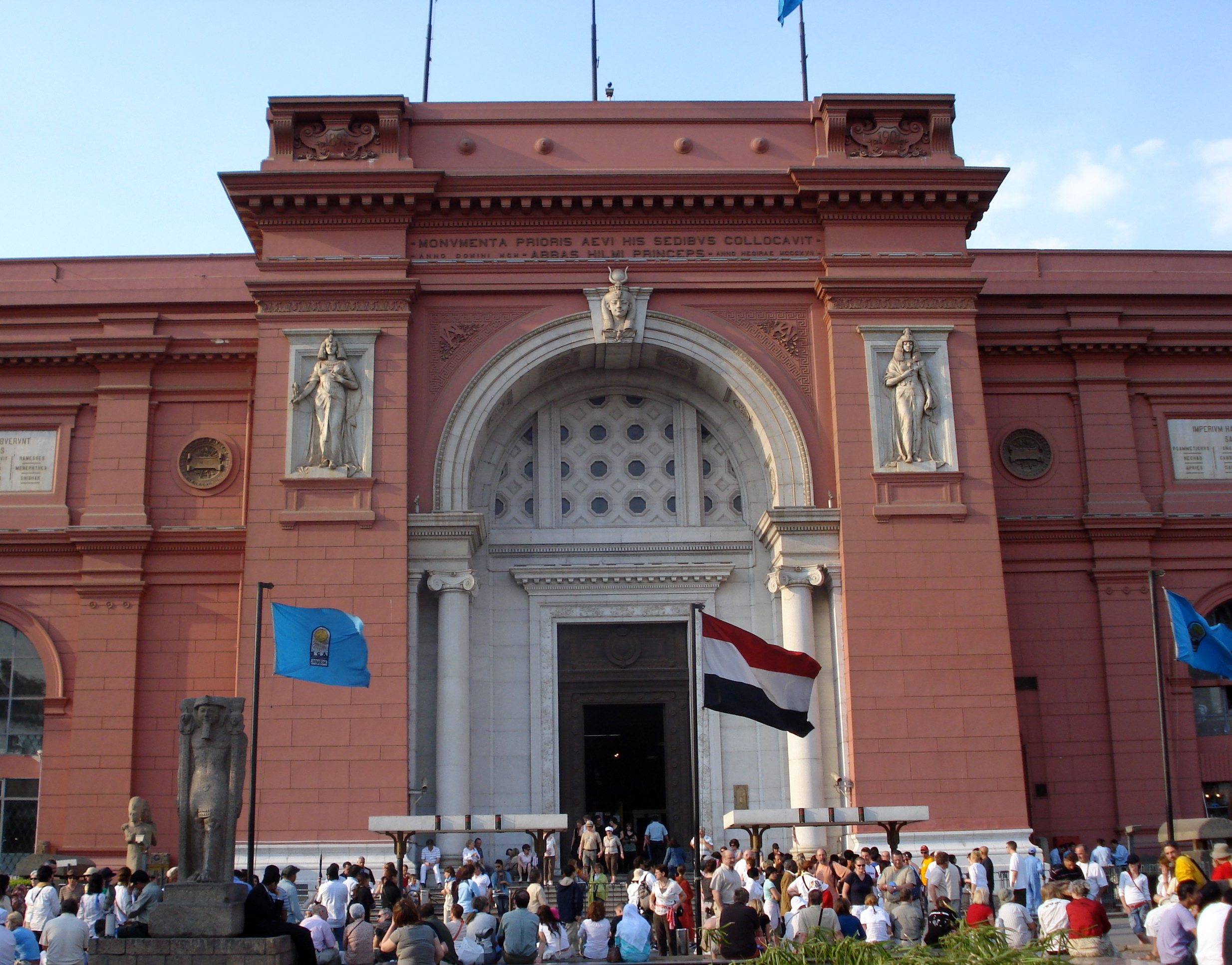
The Museum of Egyptian Antiquities: at the main entrance, the Supreme Council of Antiquities flag can be seen either side of the Egyptian flag

The Supreme Council of Antiquities (SCA; Arabic: المجلس الأعلى للآثار, romanized: al-Majlis al-Aʻlá lil-Āthār) was established in 1994, responsible for the conservation, protection, and regulation of all antiquities and archaeological excavations in Egypt. From 1994 to 2011, the SCA was a department of the Egyptian Ministry of Culture. In 2011, the Supreme Council of Antiquities became part of the independent department of the Ministry of State for Antiquites (MSA). In 2022, the department was folded into the Ministry of Antiquities and Tourism.

Although the name of the organization has changed over the years, the purpose and function of it has remained consistent.

The first government body responsible for the preservation and protection of Egypt's rich historical landscape was the Department of Antiquities, established in 1858. This became the Egyptian Antiquities Organisation in 1971.

== Role ==
As part of the Minister of Culture, The SCA is directed through the Administrative Council by the Secretary-General. The SCA was the only agent permitted to restore or preserve Egyptian monuments. It defined the boundaries around archaeological sites and required foreign archaeologists working in Egypt to report all discoveries and finds to the SCA before publication. This somewhat controversial rule led to the expulsion of some archaeologists from Egypt, but reduced the theft of archaeological finds dramatically and notified the authorities to set up security around new finds.

The SCA was also responsible for the recovery of antiquities previously stolen or illegally exported from Egypt: between 2002 and 2008, it retrieved 3,000 artefacts. It became embroiled in a dispute with the Egyptian Museum of Berlin over the bust of Nefertiti, which it claimed was removed from the country by deceit; previously it had asked for the return of the Rosetta Stone from the British Museum and the Dendara Zodiac from the Louvre.

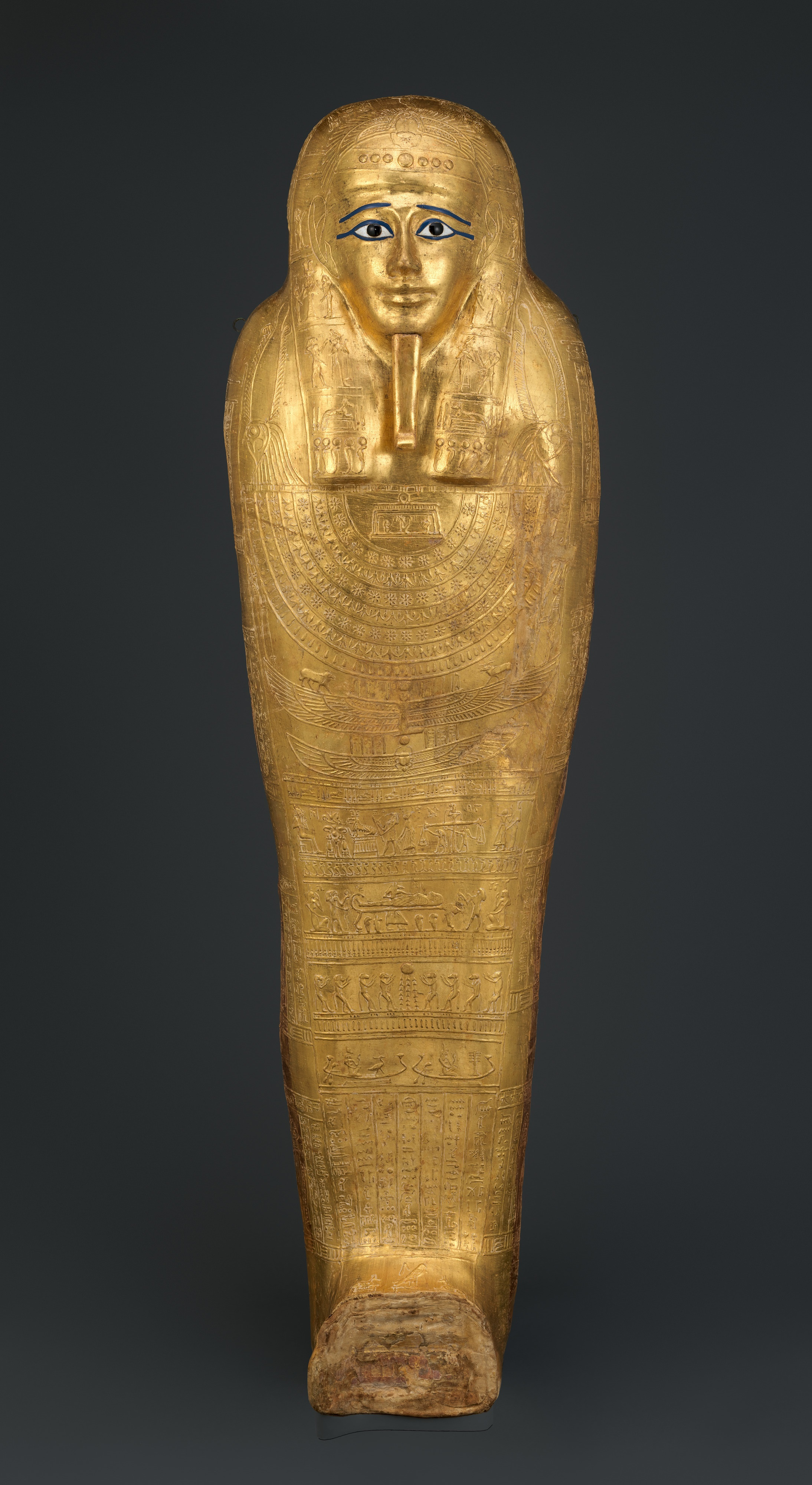
This is an image of a golden coffin that was stolen and later returned to Egypt.

== Antiquities service ==
The SCA consists of a team of experts whose aim is to protect Egypt and its history. The goals of the organization include conservation, preservation, excavations, and research of Egypt, its history, monuments, artifacts, and its peoples. In addition to these goals, the organization also was used to help promote tourism and to bring attention to the fight to have artifacts returned to Egypt. In the 21st century they also face the difficult task of keeping monuments safe from those who wish to destroy the Pharanoic monuments. The position may entail also, as was done by Zahi Hawass for many years, to stimulate tourism to Egypt, with charm and charisma. Sayed Tawfik was an Egyptologist who served from 1989–1990, when the body was called the Egyptian Antiquities Organization. At the end of 2011, Dr. Mohamed Ibrahim Aly was named antiquities minister and he promised to give new life to the body, by bringing in young archeologists and restarting projects which had been put on hold.

== History ==
=== Department of Antiquities ===
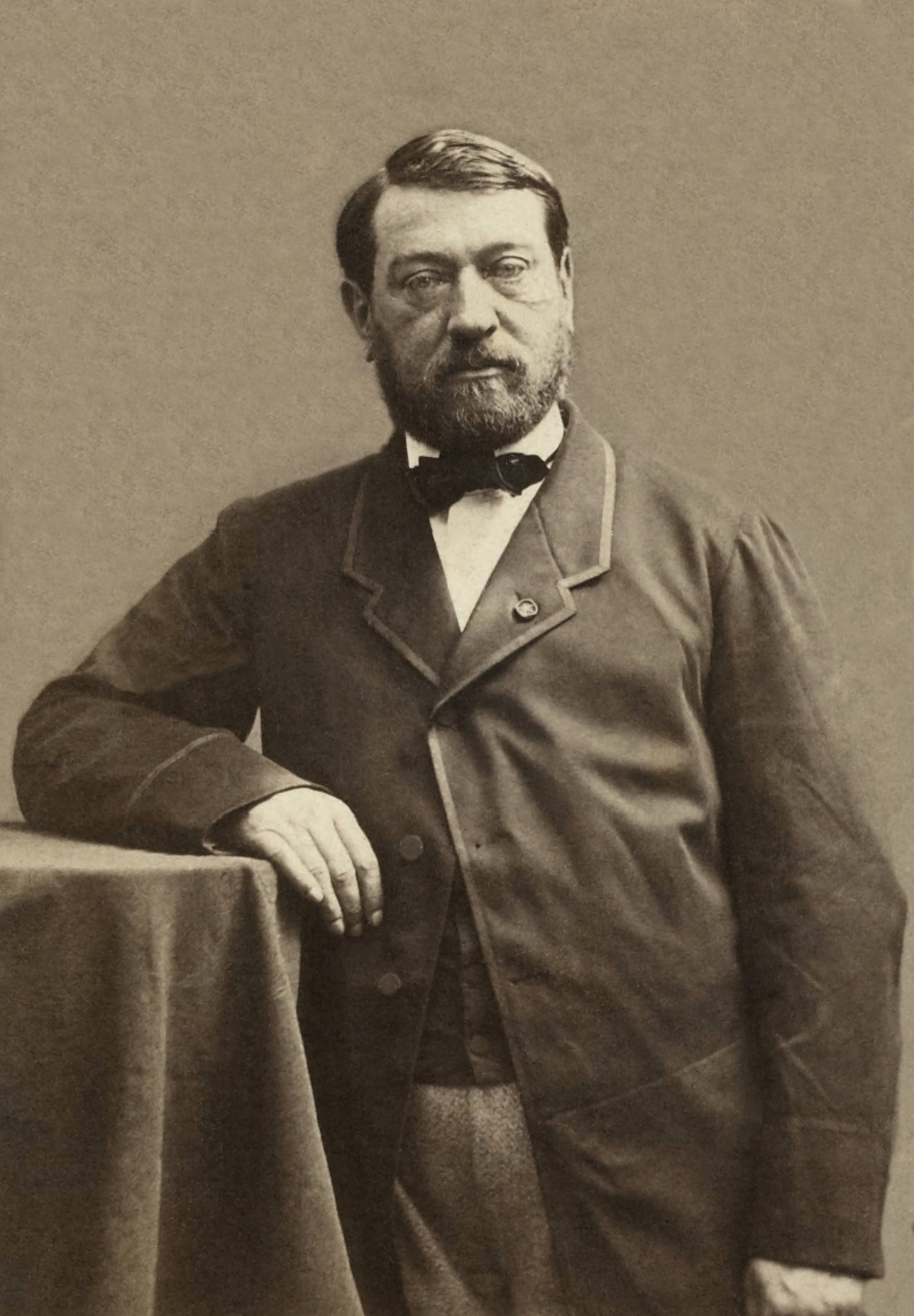
Auguste Mariette, the first director of the Department of Antiquities

In the 1850s, Auguste Mariette made several discoveries at Saqqara, which revived interest into Ancient Egypt, their culture, and their monuments. and revived an interest in Egyptology. In response to the renewed interest, in 1858 the Department of Antiquites was established, and its first Conservator was Mariette. In 1859, the Department of Antiquities was created and was in existence for more than a century.

Mariette was followed by Gaston Maspero, whose biggest contribution was the examination of the mummy of Ramses II in 1884. This event was witnessed by the Khedive and other high officials. The mummy of this great conqueror was well preserved, revealing a giant frame and a face expressive of sovereign majesty, indomitable will, and the pride of the Egyptian king of kings. He then unbandaged the mummy of Ahmose-Nefertari, wife of King Ahmose I. of the Eighteenth Dynasty, beside which, in the same sarcophagus, had been discovered the mummy of Ramses III. The physiognomy of this monarch is more refined and intellectual than that of his warlike predecessor; nor was his frame built upon the same colossal plan. The height of the body was less, and the shoulders not so wide. In the same season Maspero also discovered an ancient Egyptian romance known as the story of Sinuhe in a tomb in Thebes. A fragment on papyrus had been preserved at the Egyptian Museum of Berlin, but the whole romance was now decipherable."

"Professor Maspero resigned his office of directorship on June 5, 1886, and was succeeded in the superintendency of excavations and Egyptian archaeology by M. Eugène Grébaut. In the same month Grébaut started upon the work of unbandaging the mummy of the Theban king Seqenenre Tao, of the Seventeenth Dynasty. It was under this monarch that a revolt against the Hyksos, or Shepherd Kings, had originated, in the course of which the Asiatics were expelled from Egypt. The history of this king has always been considered legendary, but from the signs of wounds present in the mummy, it is certain that he had died in battle. In the same season the mummy of Seti I. was unbandaged, and also that of an anonymous prince."

"The next season the work of clearing away the sand from around the Great Sphinx was vigorously prosecuted by Grébaut. In the beginning of the year 1887, the chest, the paws, the altar, and plateau were all made visible. Flights of steps were unearthed, and finally accurate measurements were taken of the great figures. The height from the lowest of the steps was found to be one hundred feet, and the space between the paws was found to be thirty-five feet long and ten feet wide. Here there was formerly an altar; and a stele of Thutmosis IV. was discovered, recording a dream in which he was ordered to clear away the sand that even then was gathering round the site of the Sphinx."

=== Egyptian Antiquities Organization ===
By the 1970s, the value of Antiquities to Egypt was well-understood: both as a permanent advertisement for its tourist industry, and as an instrument of cultural prestige, imbuing a sense of pride in the post-colonial era, and maintaining morale during the numerous internal and external conflicts affecting Egypt since its independence. After more than a century of existence, the Department of Antiquities was therefore renamed in 1971.The new title sounded less bureaucratic, and suggested a dynamic agency: reflecting the value of the past to the present.

The concept appeared sound, but the value, both metaphorical and literal, of the antiquities 'industry' to Egypt indicated that, if anything, even more support and protection should be given. This led to the upgrade, firstly to a Supreme Council in 1994, then - in 2011 - to a full Ministry of State, devoted exclusively to a judicious development of the nation's heritage.

=== Sale room in the Egyptian Museum ===
In January 1881, Gaston Maspero succeeded Mariette as director of the Antiquities service (Service des Antiquités d'Egypte). In August of the same year, Amelia Edwards wrote to Maspero that thefts and robberies would probably decrease if the museum offered certified objects for sale, and that travellers would prefer to buy their ‘souvenirs’ at regulated prices at the Bulaq Museum rather than from locals. The decree of 16 May 1883 stipulated that the antiquities of the Bulaq Museum, or those that might be kept there or in other museums established in the future, were the property of the Egyptian state and for this reason were "inaliénables, insaisissables et imperscriptibles" (inalienable, unseizable, indispensable).

Nevertheless, probably in the same year, Maspero, assisted by Emil Brugsch, began to make a selection of the less important pieces to sell before they were included in the Bulaq collection. Gradually, the director introduced the official sale of antiquities in order to increase the financial resources of the Department of Antiquities and especially of the excavations. From June 1884, the sale of various objects and mummies is duly registered in the account books. It represents an important source of income for the service. Maspero himself buys small objects from the Antiquities Service for his personal collection. Many of them are now in the Egyptian collection of the Institut d'Egyptologie Victor Loret in Lyon.

The official sale of antiquities initiated by Maspero proved to be very lucrative for the Service des Antiquités d'Egypte (Antiquities service).

For this reason, a sale room (Salle de ventes) was opened in 1892 in the palace of Isma'il Pasha in Giza, which became the seat of the Egyptian Museum in the last decade of the 19th century. It was located in room 91 on the ground floor, directly accessible from the outside. When the Egyptian Museum moved to Tahrir, in the early years of the 20th century, the sale room was located in room 56 on the ground floor, accessible from the western entrance. The Egyptian state continued to operate the sale room in the Egyptian Museum until 1979, selling original ancient Egyptian artworks and other artefacts there. From a packing list as well as from other sources, such as the pages of the register of the sale room or the museums' inventories and archives, which have already been checked or reconciled, it can be deduced that the objects sold were: Reliefs, architectural elements, offering tables, coffins, complete or fragmentary statues, statue heads or torsos, headrests, capitals (mostly Coptic), canopic jars, as well as stone or glass vessels, ushabtis, weights, amulets and scarabs. Despite the opinion that the objects sold to public institutions were more important than those sold to private collectors or dealers, we can see from the register of the sale room that the latter were also able to acquire very important objects. All of these works could subsequently be legally exported. Many objects that are now kept in private collections or public museums originated here.

== Heads of Antiquities ==
=== Directors of the Department of Antiquities ===
- Auguste Mariette (1858–1881)
- Gaston Maspero (1881–1886)
- Eugène Grébaut (1886–1892)
- Jacques de Morgan (1892–1897)
- Victor Loret (1897–1899)
- Gaston Maspero (1899–1914) (bis)
- Pierre Lacau (1914–1936)
- Étienne Drioton (1936–1952)
- Mostafa Amer (1953–1956)
- Abbas Bayoumi (1956–1957)
- Moharram Kamal (1957–1959)
- Abd el-Fattah Hilmy (1959)
- Mohammed Anwar Shoukry (1960–1964)
- Mohammed Mahdi (1964–1966)
- Gamal Mokhtar (1967–1971)

=== Directors of the Egyptian Antiquities Organization ===
- Gamal Mokhtar (1971–1977)
- Mohammed Abd el-Qader Mohammed (1977–1978)
- Shehata Adam (1978–1981)
- Fuad el-Oraby (1981)
- Ahmed Khadry (1982–1988)
- Mohammed Abdel Halim Nur el-Din (1988)
- Sayed Tawfik (1989–1990)
- Mohammed Ibrahim Bakr (1990–1993)

=== Secretaries-General of the Supreme Council of Antiquities ===
- Mohammed Abdel Halim Nur el-Din (1993–1996)
- Ali Hassan (1996–1997)
- Gaballa Ali Gaballa (1997–2002)
- Zahi Hawass (2002–2011)
- Mohamed Abdel Fattah (July–September 2011)
- Moustapha Amine (29 September 2011–2013)
- Mohammad Ibrahim (2013–?)
- Mostafa Waziri (September 2017 to March 2024)
- since March 2024: Mohamed Ismail Khaled

=== Ministers of State of Antiquities ===
- Abdelfattah al-Banna [nominated]
- Zahi Hawass (2011)
- Mohamed Ibrahim Aly

=== Ministers of Tourism and Antiquities ===
- Zahi Hawass 31 January 2011 – 3 March 2011
- Mamdouh Eldamaty from June 2014
- Khaled al-Anani from 23 March 2016
- Ahmed Issa (2022 - 2024)
