= Laurent Bavay =

Belgian Egyptologist

Laurent Bavay (born March 2, 1972) is a Belgian Egyptologist who has been director of the Institut français d'archéologie orientale since June 2015.

== Career ==
Lauren Bavay is a doctor of history, art, and archaeology, he has been the head of the Egyptology department at the Free University of Brussels since 2008. He also directed the university's Archaeological Research Center until his appointment in Cairo.

For two decades, he has participated in numerous archaeological projects in Egypt, notably in Adaima, Saqqara, and Deir el-Medina with the IFAO, as well as in Tanis, Siwa, and Karnak.

His current research focuses on the archaeology of the Theban necropolis (Luxor), where he leads the excavation and study of several tombs of high-ranking officials of the New Kingdom, which were transformed into Christian hermitages at the dawn of the Arab conquest. These works have led to several significant discoveries, such as the exceptional archive of the Coptic monk Frangé in the early 8th century, and the pyramid of Khay, vizier of Pharaoh Ramses II.
