= Bulletin de l'Institut Français d'Archéologie Orientale =

- Discipline: Egyptology
- Language: English, French, German

Publication details
- History: 1901–present
- Publisher: Institut Français d'Archéologie Orientale
- Frequency: Annual
- Open access: Yes

Standard abbreviations
- ISO 4: Bull. Inst. Fr. Archéol. Orient.

Indexing
- ISSN: 0255-0962 (print); 2429-2869 (web)

Links
- Journal homepage; Online Access as PDFs (Vol. 1 to present); Online Access as HTML (Vol. 117 to present)

The Bulletin de l'Institut Français d'Archéologie Orientale is an academic journal covering the study of Egyptology. Articles cover a range of disciplines, including history, art history, archaeology, philology and religion, from the prehistoric period to the end of the Byzantine period in Egypt. Although primarily a French publication, articles written in English and German are also accepted.

The journal has been published annually by the Institut Français d'Archéologie Orientale since 1901.

The institute's official website provides an online index of articles and open access to every article from Vol. 1 (1901) to present.
