= Back to the Bible Way =

Theological periodical

Back to the Bible Way was a theological periodical published by Roy D. Goodrich in opposition to the teachings of Charles Taze Russell.

== History ==
Long-time pioneer for the International Bible Students Association and the Jehovah's Witnesses, Roy D. Goodrich (October 15, 1886 – December 1976) was excommunicated in 1944. To put his case before the public and to serve as a rallying point for other Free Bible Students, he began publishing a periodical, Back to the Bible Way, in 1952. Goodrich departed from the main body of Bible Students at two points. He denied that Charles Taze Russell, founder of the Bible Student movement, is to be considered the "wise and faithful servant" of Matthew 24:45. He also rejected Russell's thinking relative to the ransom, and to the significance of 1914. From an address in Fort Lauderdale, Florida, a large amount of literature was distributed to an unspecified number of members of the group.

The group and periodical ceased activity in 1977 after the death of Goodrich in December 1976.
