= Bible Students =

Bible Students refers to followers of the Bible Student movement and a number of related religious organizations:

- Dawn Bible Students Association
- Free Bible Students
- Friends of Man
- Jehovah's Witnesses
- Laymen's Home Missionary Movement

== See also ==
- Bible study (disambiguation)
