= Conrad C. Binkele =

Lutheran bishop (1867–1942)

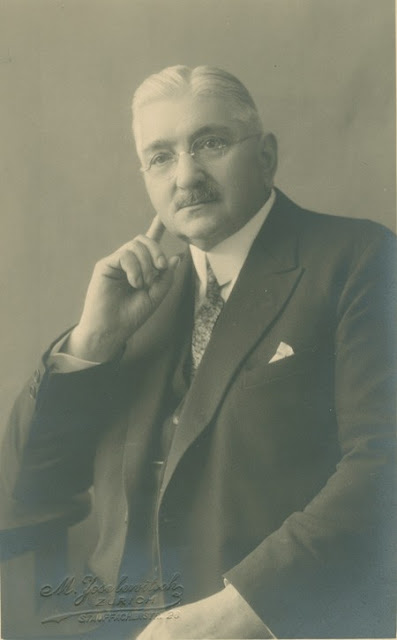
Conrad C. Binkele, anno 1931

Conrad Christian Binkele (December 3, 1867, in Eppingen, Heilbronn, Baden-Württemberg, Germany – October 29, 1942, in Los Angeles) led the activities of the Watch Tower Society for the Central European Space until 1925, and in 1928 founded the Free Bible Students in Germany.

== Early life ==
Binkele was born to Christian Heinrich Binkele, and Christine (Trefz) Binkele . His parents were Protestants. He married Caroline Walter in Tremont Illinois in 1891. In 1909, he was ordained as Elder of the Apostolic Christian Church. Binkele mastered seven languages, spoken and written.

After the tragic loss of his first wife, he came into contact with the Bible Student movement, and after studying the Studies in the Scriptures ("The Divine Plan of the Ages") he believed he had found biblical truth. A year later he resigned from his church and joined the movement. In the same year, he married Hanna Rusterholz.

== Ministry ==
From 1906 he was a full-time preacher, until he settled in 1911 as a translator for the International Bible Students Association.

Charles Taze Russell appointed Binkele as the director of the European Watch Tower offices in 1916. He was given authority to act on behalf of the Society by letters of power of attorney, giving him full control of the Society's assets there.

In 1925, Binkele left the Bible Student movement as a result of theological differences with the new Watch Tower Society president, Joseph Franklin Rutherford. He and his wife then moved to Mulhouse in Alsace.

=== Free Bible Students Association ===
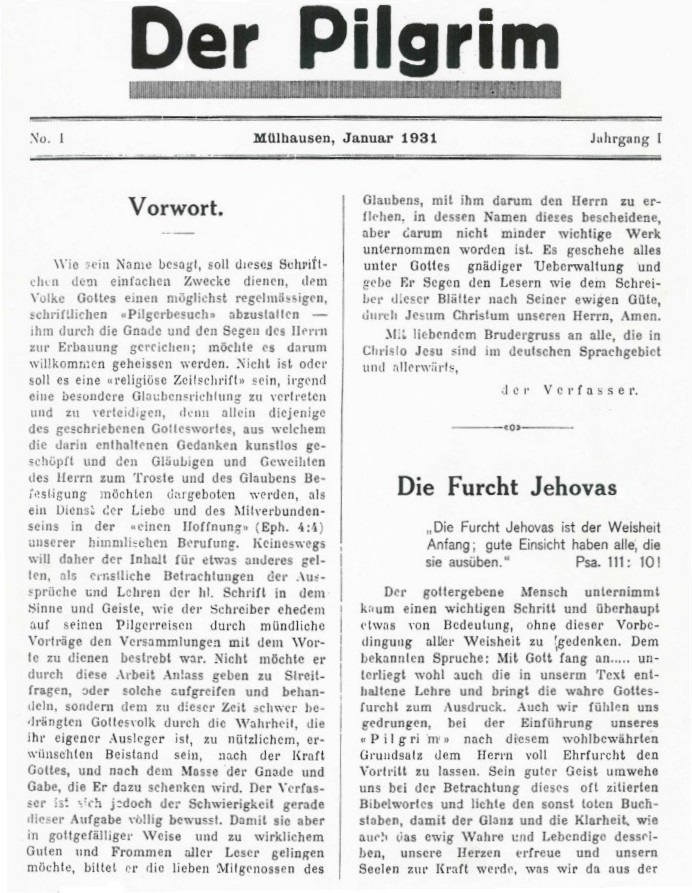
Der Pilgrim, published in 1931-1934

Binkele founded the Free Bible Students Association (FBV) in Germany in 1928 and published a magazine (The Pilgrim). In November 1933, the Free Bible Students Association was banned. Arrests were made in Berlin, Hamburg, Bavaria, and Alsace. The Gestapo raided Binkele's apartment and his office in Mulhouse, but Binkele and his wife Hanna avoided arrest because they were American citizens. The Free Bible Students' literature was banned under Hitler's regime. In 1940, the Binkeles returned to the United States. In 1942 Conrad Binkele died of chronic illness.

After the war, Free Bible Students were again able to receive literature, for the first time in over a decade.

== See also ==
- Bible Student movement
- Free Bible Students
