= Dawn Bible Students Association =

Christian organization and movement

The Dawn Bible Students Association is a Christian organization and movement, and a legal entity used by a branch of the Bible Student movement. There were approximately 60,000 members in 2004.

It was founded with the intention of becoming a publishing house to begin printing and distributing the first six volumes of the Studies in the Scriptures series that were written directly by Charles Taze Russell which the Watchtower Society had officially ceased publishing in 1927.

In 1966, the Dawn published 'Oh, the Blessedness', a small booklet which rejected most of Russell's views of Bible prophecy and end time predictions resulting in numerous internal divisions.

== History ==
In 1928 Norman Woodworth, following intense personal disagreement with the new policies of the Watch Tower Bible and Tract Society and actions of the Society's president, Joseph Rutherford, left to create the radio program Frank and Ernest with the help of the Brooklyn congregation of Bible Students. He had previously been responsible for producing the same radio program for the Watchtower Society.

In 1932, the Dawn Publishers, Inc. was founded in Brooklyn, New York, just blocks away from Watch Tower headquarters. In the 1940s it was moved to Rutherford, New Jersey under its current name, Dawn Bible Students Association. The Dawn was founded, by Woodworth and others, with the intention of becoming a publishing house to begin redistribution of the Studies in the Scriptures. Soon after starting the Frank and Ernest radio program a 4-page brochure entitled Bible Student's Radio Echo began to be printed in order to maintain public interest. Soon, its name was changed to The Dawn and Herald of Christ's Presence magazine, and its size changed to 16-pages. It began as a bi-monthly, then later monthly, journal.

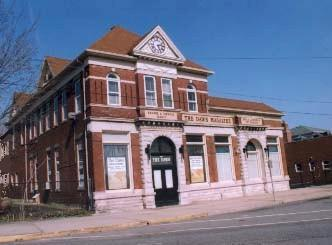
The Dawn Office in East Rutherford, New Jersey

The Dawn was influential in regathering large numbers of the Bible Students who had ceased association with Watchtower Society between 1917 and 1928, sponsoring the "First Annual Reunion Convention of Bible Students" in 1929. As a result, new congregations of Bible Students were formed in various countries worldwide and publishing their literature in various languages.

In 1966 the Dawn published Oh, the Blessedness; a small booklet which rejected many of Russell's views on Bible prophecy and end times.

This rejection polarized those Bible Students who still accepted Russell's views, and an independent movement was formed in 1974. Russell's Studies in the Scriptures as well as all other writings never before reproduced since his death were now being republished independently of the Dawn, alongside radio and television programs, journals, newsletters, books and booklets produced by various Bible Student individuals and congregations independent of the Dawn. As of 1992 all of Russell's writings, including printed sermons, speeches, newspaper and journal articles, tracts, letters and brochures have been reprinted and digitized.

Current membership in America is difficult to estimate from the number of conventions. In the late 1980s they had a membership of about 60,000. In 2007 The Dawn Magazine 75th Anniversary 1932–2007 gave a brief history of the group. In 2019, the Dawn Bible Students Association was incorporated in Florida. The New Jersey office has since been relocated to Florida.

The Dawn Bible Students continue publication of Russell's Studies in the Scriptures, as well as booklets written by various Bible Students. They also produce radio and television programs.

== Beliefs ==
The Dawn Bible Students accept the inspiration and infallibility of the Bible. They accept Jesus as God's Son and Messiah, and believe in his pre-existent divine Sonship as the "Logos", but believe that the Father is greater. They teach Christ's ransom and blood atonement for mankind, and in a general resurrection. They also teach the existence of a literal fallen angel Satan, and other demons. The Dawn Bible Students teach the necessity of the Father, Son, and Holy Spirit for salvation and sanctification, but reject the doctrines of a co-equal Trinity, immortality of the soul, and a literal hell-fire.

Studies in the Scriptures teaches two phases of the Kingdom of God - a spiritual phase, invisible, and an earthly phase.

Oh, the Blessedness! in 1966 addresses the two dates in Charles Taze Russell's prediction – the "beginning of the Master’s second presence" in 1874, and the "times of the Gentiles" end in 1914, recognising as did Russell himself in 1907 and 1916 that the predicted "foretold harvest" of saints did not end in 1914 and still is going on.

Dawn Bible Students believe in the Restitution of all things, the Restoration of Paradise and the General Resurrection under the Millennial Reign of Christ.

== See also ==
- Bible Students
- Bible Student movement
- Frank and Ernest – the international broadcast by the Dawn Bible Students Association.
