= Angelophone Records =

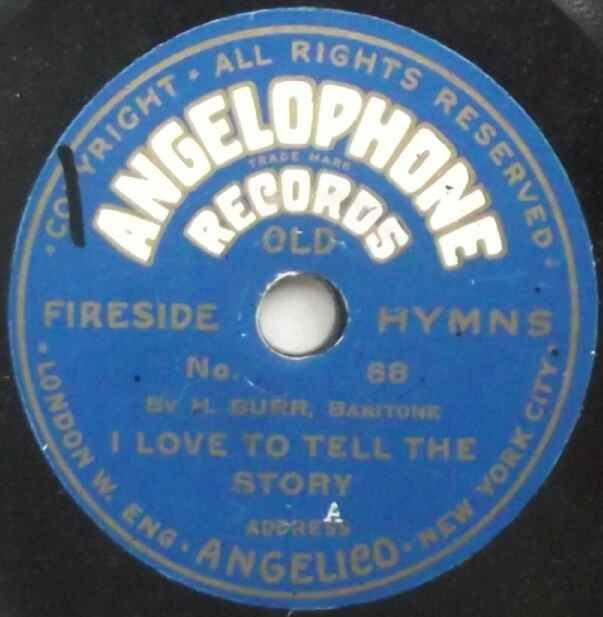
- Founded: 1916
- Status: Defunct
- Genre: Religious music
- Country of origin: United States

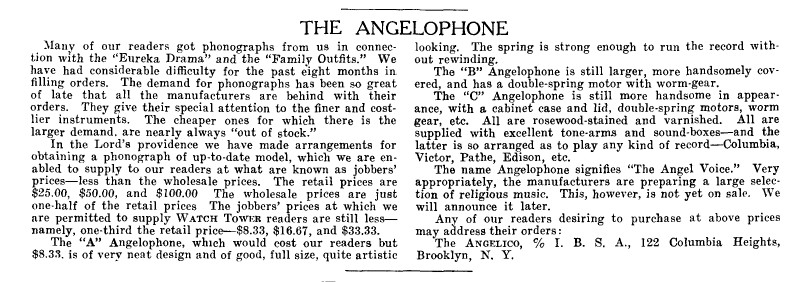
Watch Tower 15.June 1916

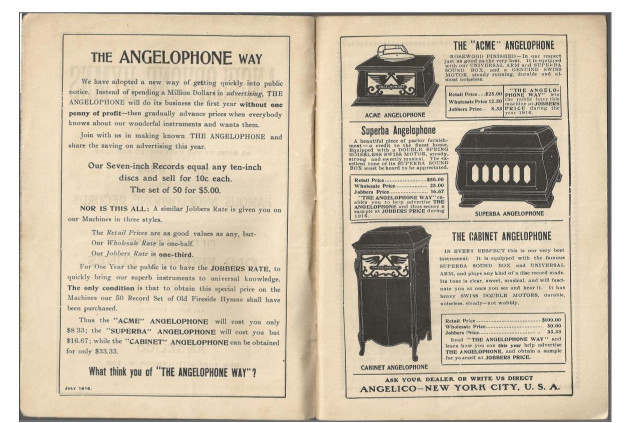
advertisement from the book Angelophone Hymns

Angelophone was a short-lived producer of disc phonographs and a record label founded in 1916 by Charles Taze Russell of the Watchtower, later known as Jehovah's Witnesses. In Watch Tower, 15 March 1917, it was announced that the company would go out of business. The Angelophone disappeared from the Watchtower society's cost list after 1919.

== History ==
The manufacturing of Angelophone were set up in Columbia height 122 next to the Brooklyn Bethel of Watchtower. Their address for ordering was 184 Fulton st. and sometimes 28 West 63d street. The company Angelico or Richie & Cooke was set up in the names of the Watch Tower Society's vice president Alfred I. Richie and the bethelite J.L. Cooke. The assembly of the units was made by 13 unpaid Bethelites.

== Record label ==
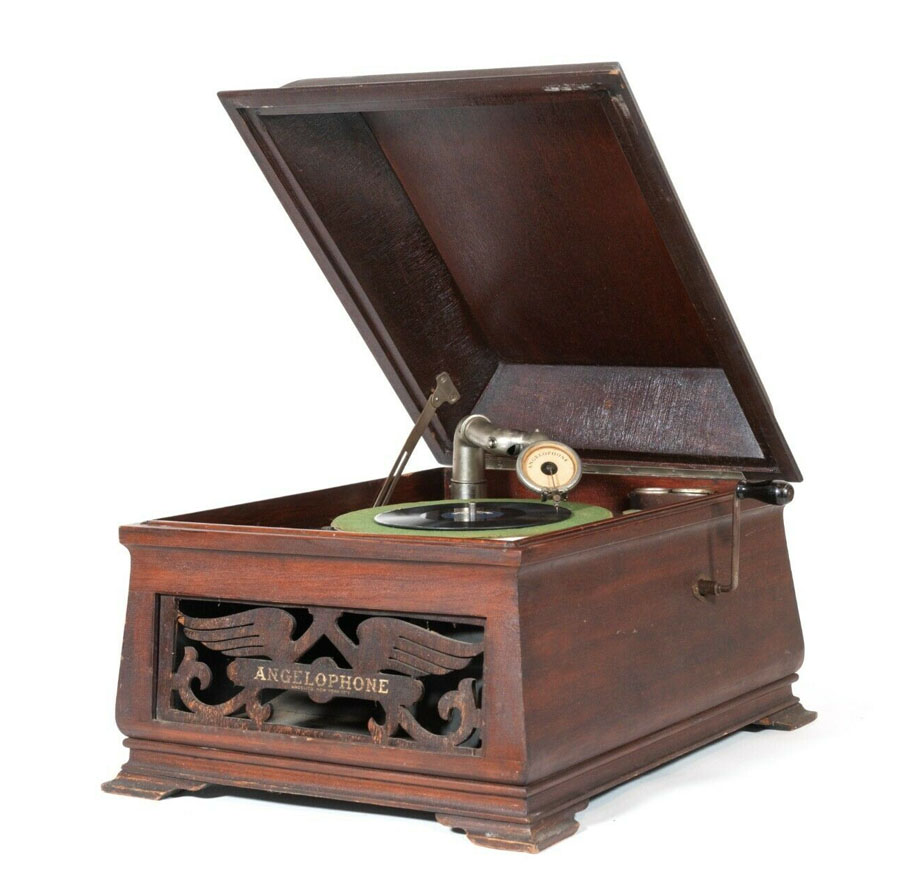
Angelophone (Superba)

Angelophone discs were produced in a set of 50, featuring a hymn on one side, and a talk about the hymn on the reverse side. The hymn was by Henry Burr and on the flip side there was an uncredited sermon by Russell.

The discs was 7" Shellac with a speed of 85rpm. From the very start there was complains about the records quality. Russells voice was weak and hard to understand and Watch Tower gives different advices for adjustments on the players during this period. Russell announc'ed that he would re-record the sermons but dies in October 1916.

Russells voice had not been suitable for the Photo-drama of creation and was dubbed by Harry Humphrey. Humphery was hired again and re-recorded the Angelophone Hymns. This time the speed was set to 80rpm – close to the standard of 78 rpm. The disc with the Russell sermons on has a dark-blue label on the hymn side and embossed sermon-side. Those with Humphery on has light blue label on hymn side and off-white label on the sermon side.

The discs usually have a normal paper label on the hymn side, but, similar to early Edison Diamond Discs, have an etched label on the "Hymn Talk" side. Specimens with other paper labels or etched labels on both sides are known. Credited to a firm named "Angelico", the discs were possibly produced by the Paroquette Record Manufacturing Company. Researchers note that both Angelophone Records and Par-o-ket Records were 7-inch, vertically cut discs and that all of the hymn sides were recorded by Henry Burr, a founder of Paroquette.

== Phonographs ==
In the 1910s there was a demand for phonographs and at the same time the patents held by Victor, Columbia and Edison expired. Therefore, hundreds of producers of phonographs popped up in the states. Motors, reproducers, tone arms and other hardware could be ordered form the big producers and furniture, department, piano or music store could put together their own phonograph and sell it under their own name.

The Angelophone phonograms was put together by 13 volunteers Bethelites and was sold for a modest price to members of the Watch Tower Society. Since there was only one year of production including trouble-solving and handling complaints, there must be a limited quantity of players put together by those 13 workers.

The Superba used a Meisselbach Phonograph Motor No. 16 and the furniture of the machine was in art nouveau style with angel wings on the front and on some editions trumpet-playing angels.

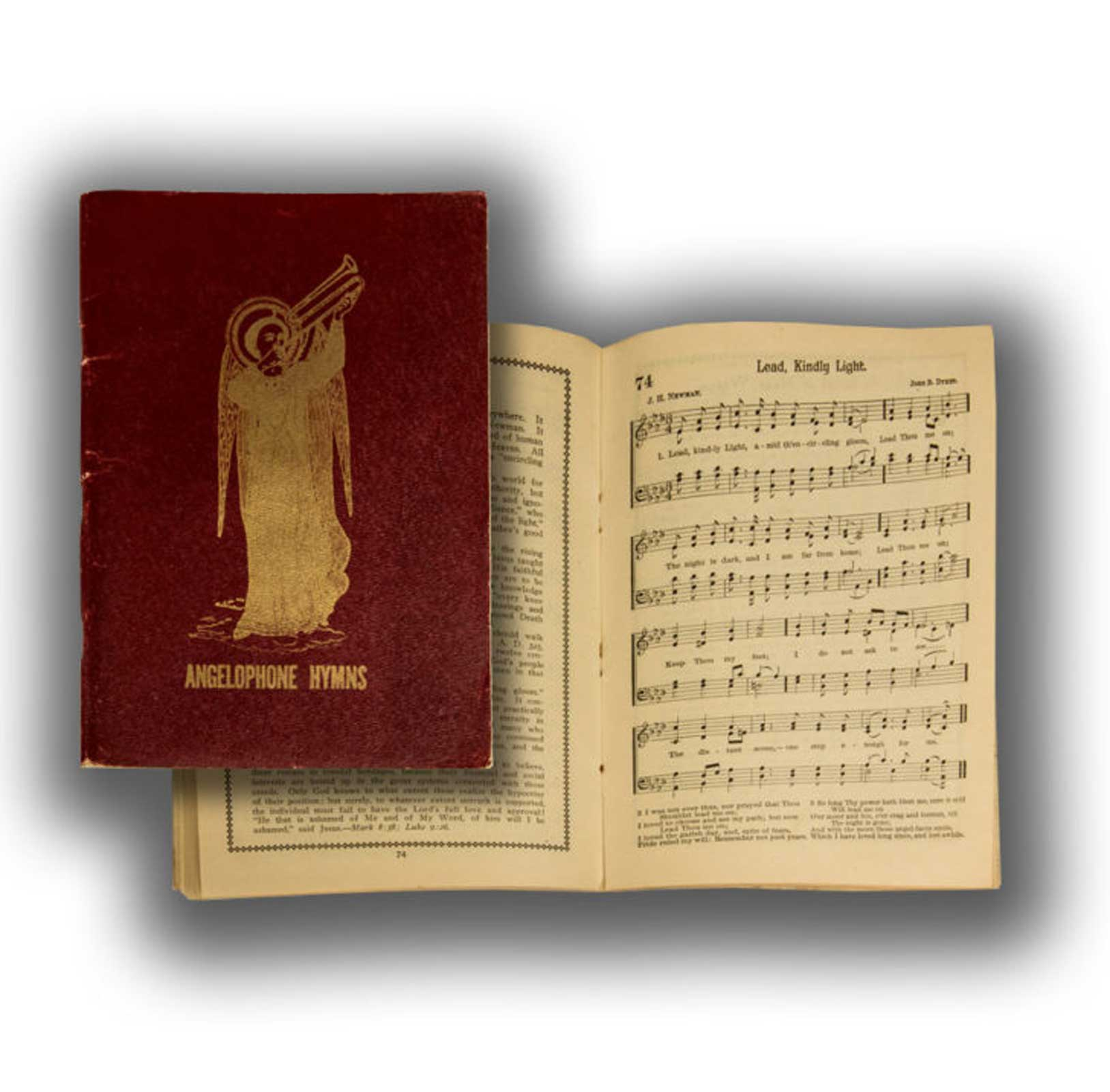
Angelophone Hymns songbook 1916

== Angelophone hymns - songbook ==
An accompanying hymn book originates from the same year as the records. The publication was available in hardcover and paperback, and was 100 pages long. The whole thing was prepared for playback on sold angelophones. A set of fifty gramophone records cost $5, while a single record was available for 10 cents apiece. The set was extremely popular, especially among people from small, rural gatherings. These people were very often poor and did not have the opportunity to go to the conventions. Thanks to these recordings, they could hear performances of pious songs, and in some assemblies gramophone records were played during services, using them as an accompaniment to singing.

== The end of Angelophone ==
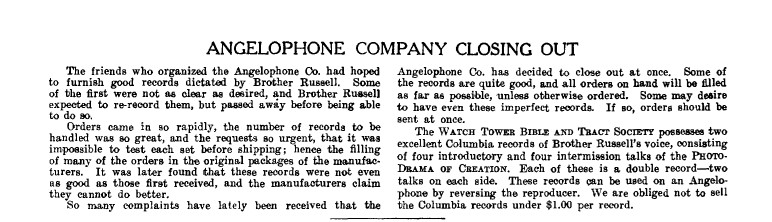
Watch Tower 15.March 1917

In the period after Russell's death in 1916 there was conflict in the Watchtower leadership. The WatchTower Society Vice President, Alfred I. Ritchie was in a conflict with Watchtowers new president Joseph Franklin Rutherford and the work with Angelophone was one of the arguments. Angelophone Records was mentioned as a part of the dispute and splitting of the Watch Tower society in this period.

On 15 March 1917 Watch Tower announced that the company would go out of business. There had also been complaints about the records quality and that the voice of Russell was weak and hard to understand. The Angelophone disappeared from the Watchtower society's cost list after 1919.

== Legacy ==
Angelophone may have been the first disc record label devoted solely to Anglo-American religious music. An earlier gospel company, Sankey Records made by Ira D. Sankey, had produced only cylinders.

== See also ==
- List of record labels
- Watchtower Bible & Tract Society of New York, Inc. v. Village of Stratton
- Charles Taze Russell
