= Cross and Crown =

Christian symbol

Cross and Crown

Crowned cross

USVA Headstone Emblem 47

The Cross and Crown (a cross passing through a crown) is a Christian symbol used by various Christian denominations. It has also been used in heraldry. The emblem is often interpreted as symbolizing the reward in heaven (the crown) coming after the trials in this life (the cross) (James 1:12).

== Uses and background ==
In addition to Roman Catholic and Orthodox Christian uses, the symbol also appears in the seal of the Church of Christ, Scientist, where it is surrounded by the words "Heal the Sick, Cleanse the Lepers, Raise the Dead, Cast Out Demons", from the Gospel of Matthew, 10:8.

The symbol is also associated with Freemasonry, specifically the Knight Templar degree of the York Rite of Freemasonry. The symbol is also known as "Knight Templars Blood-Red Passion Cross and Crown". The cross and crown symbol is often surrounded by the phrase "In Hoc Signo Vinces", which is Latin for "By this sign thou shalt conquer". This is a reference to the story of Constantine, who reportedly had a vision of a Chi Rho symbol, and a voice saying "By this sign thou shalt conquer".

The symbol was used particularly by the Bible Student movement. The symbol was also featured in the early publications and memorabilia of the International Bible Students Association. First appearing on the cover of the January 1881 issue of Zion's Watch Tower, the cross and crown were surrounded by a wreath of laurel leaves, and the symbol was also used on lapel pins, buttons (metal and celluloid) and pendants of various designs. However, not all of its uses by the I.B.S.A. included the wreath of laurel leaves. Although Charles Taze Russell's gravesite is marked by a pyramid memorial erected by the Watch Tower Bible and Tract Society with an illustration of the Cross and Crown symbol, the Watchtower Society later discontinued using the cross and crown some years after, viewing it as a "pagan symbol" – their doctrine for some time since is that Jesus was executed not on a cross but on an upright stake.

The Cross and Crown symbol is also the key emblem of the Royal Black Institution (a sister organisation of the Orange Order), a Protestant fraternity, with structural and symbolic similarities to Freemasonry.

The Cross and Crown symbol was also used by the Rexist Party.

The Cross and Crown symbol also appears on the cover of the 1998 book, The Power of the Cross, by Tim Lahaye.

Lutheran composer J.S. Bach's cantata Weinen, Klagen, Sorgen, Zagen, BWV 12 (1714) contains an aria "Kreuz und Krone sind verbunden, Kampf und Kleinod sind vereint" ("cross and crown are bound together, conflict and jewel are united") which has been connected with Luther's rendering of 1 Corinthians 9:24-25.
