= R. E. Streeter =

Co-founder of Pastoral Bible Institute

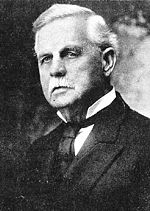
- R.E. Streeter (1847–1924)
- Born: February 11, 1847; North Smithfield, Rhode Island, U.S.
- Died: December 20, 1924 (aged 77)

Randolph Elwood Streeter (February 11, 1847 – December 20, 1924), often referred to as R. E. Streeter, was one of the founding fathers of the Pastoral Bible Institute and a member of the editorial board of that church's The Herald of Christ's Kingdom magazine.

== Life ==
Streeter was born February 11, 1847, in North Smithfield, Rhode Island. His parents moved to Providence, Rhode Island, in 1850 where he spent his youth and eventually entered the jewelry business. He married Isabel Brown in 1868 and had three children: Frank E., Arthur B., and Elizabeth Streeter. In 1877 he moved to Auburn, Rhode Island, where he would spend the remainder of his life. His wife died after 13 years, and in 1882 he married her sister, Margaret E. Brown, to whom were born four more children: Frank H. Thompson, John L. Leonard, Alice M., and Randolph H. Streeter.

Streeter became a Christian in 1877 and was originally associated with the Free Baptist church. Finding denominational restrictions too binding, he left that fellowship and joined the Evangelical Advent church. He first received The Divine Plan of the Ages in 1896 but rejected it as a false teaching. The following year he was sent on a successful missionary assignment to South America and the West Indies where he received another copy of that book and read it on his return journey. This time he accepted its message.

As editor beginning in 1892 of a small journal, The Testimony of Jesus, he continued its publication and presented to his readers the new views he was learning. Eventually he discontinued the magazine and in 1902 entered the pilgrim ministry under Pastor Charles Taze Russell.

He was a member of The Herald editorial committee beginning in 1918 and was elected a trustee of the Pastoral Bible Institute in 1923, serving in that capacity until his death the following year. He authored Daniel, the Beloved of Jehovah (2 vols., 1923) and The Revelation of Jesus Christ (posthumously 1928).

Streeter died on the evening of December 20, 1924, from what was thought to be typhoid fever. His funeral was held on December 23.
