= FBV =

FBV may refer to:

- FBV, railway branch acquired by Ferrovie Emilia Romagna
- FBV, abbreviation of Free Bible Students Association, organization founded by Conrad C. Binkele
- FBV, code for Beervelde railway station, a railway station in Belgium
- Free Bible Version, an English Bible translation
- Fraise-basilic-vodka, a strawberry basil vodka jam created by Canadian chef Andrea Jourdan
