= Jehovah's Witnesses splinter groups =

A number of splinter groups have separated from Jehovah's Witnesses since 1931 after members broke affiliation with the Watch Tower Bible and Tract Society of Pennsylvania. Earlier group defections from the Watch Tower Society, most of them between 1917 and 1931, had resulted in a number of religious movements forming under the umbrella term of the Bible Student movement.

After 1931, some isolated groups of Jehovah's Witnesses came to distrust instruction from outside the local area. Some preferred their autonomy even after persecution and isolation abated, such as in Germany following World War II, in Romania following the overthrow of Nicolae Ceaușescu, and in the former USSR following the Cold War.

== Britain ==
Jesse Hemery was appointed overseer of the Watch Tower Society's British Isles branch office by Charles Taze Russell in 1901, holding that post until 1946. Hemery founded the Goshen Fellowship after he was disfellowshipped by Nathan H. Knorr in 1951.

== Central African Republic ==
In 1947, Josué Dioh founded "Kanda Dia Kinzinga" (People for Eternal Life), after attending some of Jehovah's Witnesses meeting in Ubangi-Shari. The group operated independently from Jehovah's Witnesses in Bangui, but was assimilated into the Cameroon branch in the 1950s.

== Germany, postwar ==
During the Nazi regime, many Jehovah's Witnesses in Germany were incarcerated in prison or concentration camps. They were represented by various Bible Students Associations, each of which considered itself affiliated with the Watch Tower Society despite little contact with their US headquarters in Brooklyn. When contact was re-established, a minority of German Jehovah's Witnesses either preferred their autonomy or disagreed with the doctrinal changes that had occurred in the meantime. Some disassociated themselves from the Watch Tower Society and some individual members established contact with non-Jehovah's Witness Bible Student groups.

== Romania ==
In 1948, the Romanian government imposed a ban on Jehovah's Witnesses that lasted until 1989. Many Witnesses were arrested and sent to prison or labor camps; members of the denomination had limited communication with other Witnesses and studied largely from older books and magazines. In 1962, The Watchtower altered its doctrine on the meaning of the phrase "superior authorities" in Romans 13:1, identifying them as human governmental authorities rather than God and Christ as formerly thought.

Many Witnesses in Romania rejected the change, and some suspected it was a communist fabrication intended to make them subservient to the state. In 1989, after the Romanian ban was lifted, members and representatives of the Governing Body of Jehovah's Witnesses were able to meet thousands of long-separated Romanian Witnesses. Some Romanians still rejected certain changes and preferred their autonomy, forming The True Faith Association of Jehovah's Witnesses in 1992.

== Sierra Leone ==
In 1956, Watch Tower Society representatives visiting Freetown, Sierra Leone, encountered a splinter group called the "Ecclesia of Jehovah's Witnesses" that had formed several years prior.

== USSR ==
When the Watch Tower Society changed its interpretation of the "superior authorities", some Jehovah's Witnesses in the USSR suspected that the change came from the KGB instead. This led to the formation of the Theocratic Organization of Jehovah's Witnesses, which discontinued the use of Watch Tower Society publications printed after 1962. The group has a presence in Russia, Ukraine, and Moldova, and claims to seek contact with Witnesses in other countries. The group does not publish any statistics regarding the number of congregations or adherents and has little or no public presence.

== See also ==
- History of Jehovah's Witnesses
