= New Creation =

New Creation may refer to:

- New Creation Church, a non-denominational megachurch
- The New Creation, a Christian magazine
- New creation (theology), the Christian doctrine of the New Creation, see salvation
