= Frank and Ernest =

Frank and Ernest may refer to:

- Frank and Ernest (comic strip)
- Frank and Ernest (broadcast)
- Frank and Ernest Denouement
