= Paul S. L. Johnson =

American scholar and pastor (1873–1950)

Paul Samuel Leo Johnson
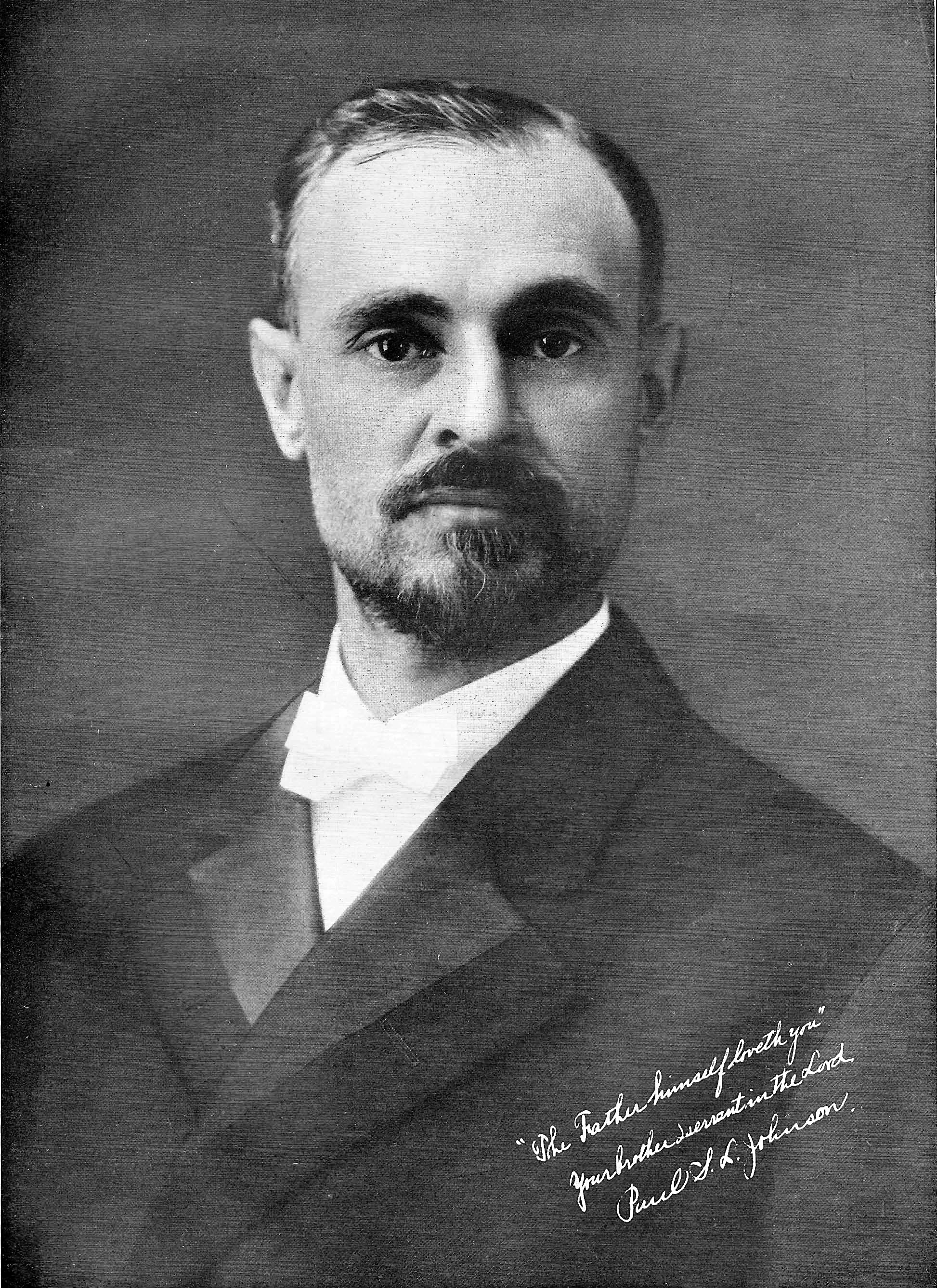
- Born: Paul Samuel Leo Levitsky; October 4, 1873; Titusville, Pennsylvania, US
- Died: October 22, 1950 (aged 77); Philadelphia, Pennsylvania, US
- Occupation: Minister
- Years active: 1898–1950
- Known for: Founder of the Laymen's Home Missionary Movement
- Notable work: Epiphany Studies in the Scriptures

Paul Samuel Leo (formerly Levitsky) Johnson (October 4, 1873 – October 22, 1950) was an American scholar and pastor, the founder of the Laymen's Home Missionary Movement. He authored 17 volumes of religious writings entitled Epiphany Studies in the Scriptures, and published two magazines from about 1918 until his death in 1950. The movement he created continues his work and publishes his writings, operating from Chester Springs, Pennsylvania.

== Life ==
Johnson was born in Titusville, Pennsylvania, on October 4, 1873, to Jewish parents who had recently immigrated from Poland. His father was a prominent Hebrew scholar, and eventually became president of the Titusville synagogue. His mother died when he was 12, and his father remarried, both of which caused him distress; he ran away from home several times.

Johnson eventually converted to Christianity and joined the Methodist Church.

In 1890, Johnson entered the Capital University of Columbus, Ohio, and graduated in 1895 with high honors. Records in that University's Library show him enrolled as Paul Levitsky; he then went to the Theological Seminary of the Evangelical Lutheran Joint Synod of Ohio and graduated in 1898. He pastored a Lutheran church for a short time in Mars, Pennsylvania, and was then transferred back to Columbus, Ohio, at St. Matthew's Lutheran Church, which was later razed to make way for highway infrastructure. He soon built a new church building and was noted (by the Capitol University Synod) to have baptized more people and collected less money than any other pastor in the synod.

In May 1903, Johnson left the Lutheran Church as a consequence of changes in his beliefs, and began fellowship with the Columbus Ecclesia of the Watch Tower Society. The Lutheran Church later claimed they had disfellowshipped him for heresy, but he had already left them of his own free will. A year later, Pastor Charles Taze Russell appointed him a Pilgrim of the Bible Student movement. He eventually served as Russell's personal secretary. In time, he became Russell's most trusted friend and advisor.

Johnson suffered a nervous breakdown in 1910 a result of withstanding dissidents from within who were challenging the teachings of Pastor C. T. Russell on questions around his understanding of the new covenant and the ransom for all.

Johnson left the Watch Tower Society when Joseph F. Rutherford took over its direction after Russell's death. He founded the Laymen's Home Missionary Movement in 1920, and served on its board of directors from 1920 until his death on October 22, 1950.
