= Bible study =

Bible study or Biblical study may refer to:

- Bible study (Christianity), the study of the Bible by people as a personal religious or spiritual practice
- Biblical studies, the academic application of a set of diverse disciplines to the study of the Bible
- Bible Study Fellowship, an international Christian interdenominational or parachurch fellowship of lay people offering a system of structured Bible study
- Campus Bible Study, at the University of New South Wales

== See also ==
- Bible Students (disambiguation)
- Bachelor of Biblical Studies, an undergraduate academic degree offering a comprehensive curriculum in the different aspects of the Bible
- Carolina College of Biblical Studies, a nondenominational Bible college in Fayetteville, North Carolina
- College of Biblical Studies, a private nonprofit nondenominational Evangelical Bible college in Houston, Texas
- Diploma of Biblical Studies, a course in biblical, theological, historical and pastoral studies
- Doctor of Biblical Studies, a doctoral-level advanced professional degree in applied theology for practitioners and other individuals who seek to increase knowledge and understanding of biblical and theological principles
- Northeast Institute of Biblical and Theological Studies, a private religious institute in Corinth, New York
- Study Bible, an edition of the Bible prepared for use by a serious student of the Bible
