= Pastoral Bible Institute =

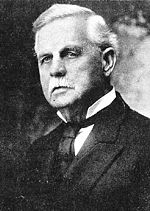
R.E. Streeter, editor of The Herald of Christ's Kingdom

The Pastoral Bible Institute was started in 1918 when a number of prominent leaders and members withdrew their support from the Watch Tower Society after Joseph Rutherford became the president of the Society, following the death of pastor Charles Taze Russell. The Watchtower society was the publishing arm of the Bible Student movement, a Christian denomination following Millerite Adventist notions guided by principles expounded by Pastor Russell who founded and led the movement.

The first Bible Student Convention held independent of the Watch Tower Society took place on July 26–29, 1918, in Asbury Park, New Jersey. In November 1918, two to three hundred people attended the second convention in Providence, Rhode Island. It was at this meeting that the Pastoral Bible Institute (PBI) was formed to resume Pastor Russell’s pastoral work independent of the Society.

In December 1918 the first issue of The Herald of Christ's Kingdom was published. It was edited by R. E. Streeter until his death in December 1924. Today the PBI functions in a reduced capacity and continues to publish the Herald magazine and distribute Christian literature.
