= The Dawn (magazine) =

Periodical by the Dawn Bible Students Association

The Dawn is a religious magazine printed and published by the Dawn Bible Students Association, East Rutherford, New Jersey, and branch offices around the world. The magazine was first published in 1932 as a monthly journal, with the full title, The Dawn—A Herald of Christ’s Presence.

== Content ==
The magazine includes articles about Christian life, prophecy, Bible study and biblical interpretation, from a politically conservative Christian viewpoint.
