= Three Worlds (book) =

1877 book by Nelson H. Barbour and Charles Taze Russell

Three Worlds, and the Harvest of This World
- Title page
- Author: Nelson H. Barbour
- Language: English
- Subject: Millennialism; Eschatology
- Published: Nelson H. Barbour; Charles Taze Russell
- Publication date: 1877
- Publication place: United States
- Media type: Print
- Pages: 194
- OCLC: 41016956
- Dewey Decimal: 236.9
- LC Class: BT890 .B33
- Text: Three Worlds, and the Harvest of This World at Internet Archive

Three Worlds, and the Harvest of This World is a 194-page religious book published in 1877 by American Adventist preacher Nelson H. Barbour and Charles Taze Russell, who later founded the Watch Tower Bible and Tract Society of Pennsylvania.

== Overview ==
The book used elements of elaborate Bible chronology, prophetic speculation and eschatology to promote the belief that one could determine God's timetable for Jesus Christ's second coming, the rapture of the saints and the restoration of the earth to a paradise-like Eden.

Though it bore the names of both Barbour and Russell as publishers, the book was written entirely by Barbour, a former Millerite, who used some of preacher William Miller's teachings as its basis. Barbour's writings were highly influential in the development of Russell's later teachings, which led to the formation of the Bible Student movement and later, Jehovah's Witnesses. Its computations of the length of the "times of the Gentiles" mentioned at Luke 21:24, calculated as 2,520 years from 606 BC used an interpretation that is still adhered to by Jehovah's Witnesses.

It used the year-day system of interpreting prophecies, presented the idea of a 360-day "prophetic year" and a historicist interpretation of the book of Revelation. It drew on the millenarian studies of 19th-century writers in formulating a system that demonstrated remarkable biblical-mathematical "correspondencies" and modified Bishop James Ussher's chronological calculation to declare that 6,000 years of human history had ended in the autumn of 1873 and that a "morning of joy" was about to begin for humankind.

Three Worlds, subtitled "A Brief Review of the Bible Plan of Redemption", applied dispensationalist principles to divide religious history into three great epochs, or worlds. "The world that was" extended from creation to the Flood, while "the present evil world" extended from the Flood to the dawn of the third epoch, "the world to come". In the first epoch the world was under the ministration of angels; during the second epoch Satan has limited control; the third epoch will be under divine administration. It proposed that Christ's second coming began in 1874, and would be followed by a forty-year harvest period including the rapture of the Saints in 1878, leading up to God's judgment of the nations and day of wrath in 1914.

Russell had provided Barbour with funds to write the book after learning that Barbour's magazine, The Herald of the Morning, had stopped publication, and he sought to use Three Worlds to combine Barbour's teachings on chronology with his own—that Christ's death had served as a ransom-price for the potential restoration to a state of Adamic perfection of all people of all generations. The pair fell out a year later over the ransom doctrine and Russell withdrew his financial support and began to publish his own magazine, Zion's Watch Tower and Herald of Christ's Presence.
