= Northeast Institute of Biblical and Theological Studies =

- Other names: NIBTS
- Motto: Equipping Students for God's Service
- Type: Private
- Established: 2013
- Affiliations: Pentecostal
- President: Rev. Thomas Switala
- Academic staff: 2
- Administrative staff: 1
- Students: 5
- Undergraduates: 5
- Location: Corinth, NY, United States; 43.22°N 73.82°W
- Campus: NIBTS Campus
- Website: www.nibts.com

Northeast Institute of Biblical and Theological Studies (NIBTS) is a private religious institute located in Corinth, NY. NIBTS is run under Full Gospel Fellowship

== History ==
NIBTS was established by Reverend Thomas Switala in 2013 and began its first classes on September 15, 2014 with 5 students for its first class. It was run out of Full Gospel Assembly in Corinth, NY and operated under Full Gospel Fellowship.

== Campus ==
The current campus of NIBTS is located at Full Gospel Assembly in Corinth, NY

== Academics ==
NIBTS currently offers small solutions for degrees and certificates being a new institute.

=== Admissions ===
NIBTS uses a trimester system for its school year. Applications can be made throughout the year to begin classes and will be reviewed by the admissions staff. Current application approval percentage is 100% based on the first semester of applicants.

=== Courses and opportunities ===
NIBTS is a small and young Institute, offering two degrees and two certificates for students interested in attending. Students can currently learn by attending the campus but solutions for distant learning are in the works

- Certificate of Biblical Studies
- Christian Worker's Certificate
- Baccalaureate Degree in Biblical Studies
- Associate Degree in Biblical Studies
