= Frank and Ernest (broadcast) =

Frank and Ernest is the name of an international religious broadcast by the Dawn Bible Students Association, which has been heard on many stations, including Radio Luxembourg. The program's format was generally that of a personal dialogue, wherein "Frank" asked "Ernest" a question (or vice versa), and a reply is given in order to expound upon the Bible.

== History ==
Norman Woodworth initially created Frank and Ernest for the Watch Tower Bible and Tract Society.

In 1932, Woodworth left the Watch Tower, following intense personal disagreement with new policies and practices. With the help of the Brooklyn, New York Congregation of Bible Students, he subsequently created a new program by the same name.
