= Laymen's Home Missionary Movement =

Interdenominational religious organisation

The Laymen's Home Missionary Movement, founded by Paul S. L. Johnson in 1920, is a non-sectarian, interdenominational religious organisation that arose as an independent offshoot of the Watch Tower Bible and Tract Society after the death of its founder, Charles Taze Russell. It is active in many countries, including the United States, Poland, Ukraine, Lithuania, Germany, Brazil, France, the United Kingdom, India, Africa (Nigeria, Kenya) and the Caribbean (Jamaica, Barbados, Trinidad).

== Early history ==
In early 1917, a disagreement arose between the members of the Editorial Committee of the Watch Tower Bible and Tract Society (the Bible Student movement founded by Charles Taze Russell) over Russell's arrangements for the Editorial Committee outlined in his Last Will and Testament and the Society's official charter.

This caused the Society to splinter into many factions with over 75% of the original Bible students leaving the WTBTS by 1928 with many forming other independent groups and fellowships which included the Elijah Voice Society, The Pastoral Bible Institute (PBI) and others. The Laymen's Home Missionary Movement (LHMM) was formed by three former members of the Pastoral Bible Institute Committee which was formed by a large group of dissenting brethren in 1917 at the Fort Pitt Convention (Paul S L Johnson, Raymond G Jolly and Robert Hirsch). The name had been used by Pastor Russell to describe the association he led as well as the more frequent designation: International Bible Students Association. Following its 1918 founding, the Laymen's Home Missionary Movement is active in 13 countries. The Laymen’s Home Missionary Movement today represents a small community of about 15,000 members worldwide.

== Schisms ==
After the death of Pastor Johnson in 1950, Raymond G. Jolly led the movement, but soon there were disagreements with other members:

- John Krewson of Fort Myers, Florida was disfellowshipped in 1955 and formed the Laodicean Home Missionary Movement in Philadelphia.
- John Hoefle of Mount Dora, Florida left the Watchtower Society to join Johnson in 1928, and was disfellowshipped in 1956. He formed his own group, the Epiphany Bible Students Association, and published a newsletter under the same name. He died in 1980 and his wife Emily continued the work until her death in January 2010. The work continues under a board of directors.

== Leadership ==
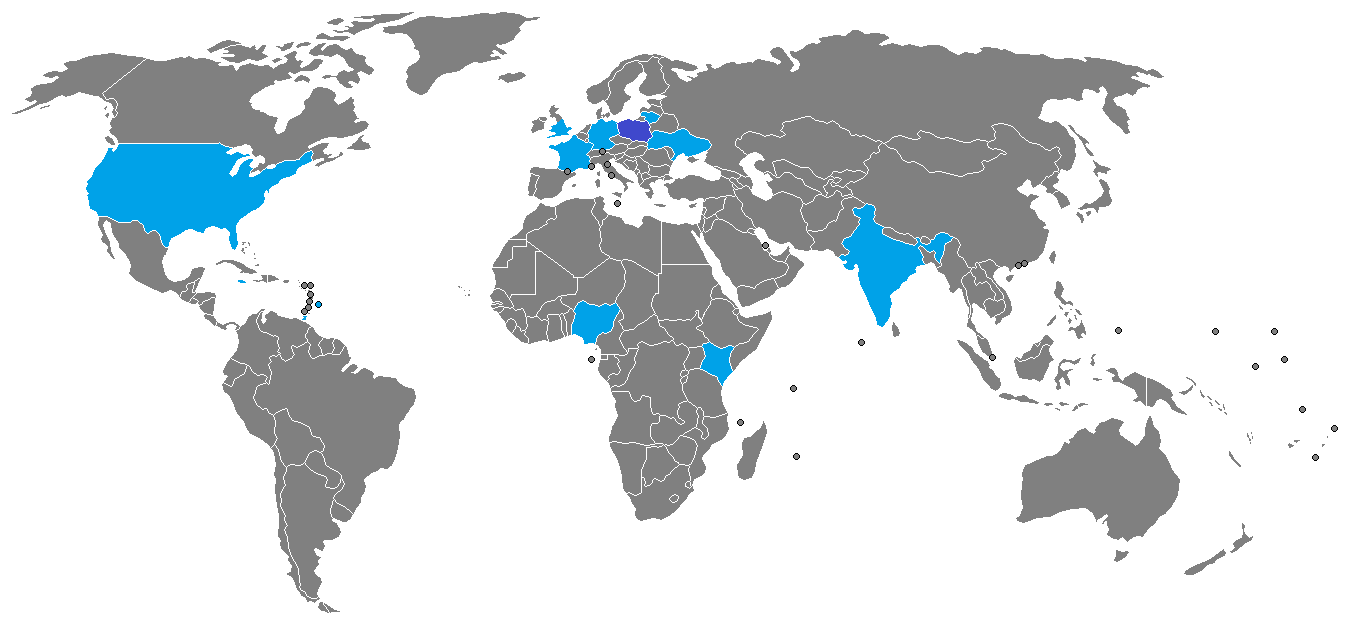
LHMM in the world – more than 1000 members – several hundred members

Paul S. L. Johnson (1920–1950) graduated from Capital University of Columbus Ohio with high honors, and also from the Theological Seminary of the Evangelical Lutheran Joint Synod of Ohio. Pastor Johnson was a Greek and Hebrew scholar, which gave him the skills necessary to understand the Bible from the original languages. He came to believe that a God of perfect wisdom, justice, power and love, would not punish his enemies forever. He adopted the view that Bible teaches that the punishment for sin is death, not eternal torment.

Raymond G. Jolly (1950–1979) graduated from Bloomsburg State College with high honors. He studied theology and the classics at Lafayette College, Easton, Pennsylvania. He served in the Presbyterian Church, but later left to promote the Gospel from a non-sectarian standpoint, serving as a pilgrim under both Pastors Russell and Johnson. He assumed the office of Executive after the demise of the latter until his own death, Feb. 14, 1979.

August Gohlke (1979–1985), a special helper under Raymond Jolly was appointed as Executive Trustee in 1979, and served until his death in 1985, greatly expanding the public work, including a radio broadcast ministry that covered large parts of the United States.

Bernard W. Hedman (1986–2004) was Editor of The Bible Standard magazine from 1985 until his death in 2004; he also served as Executive Trustee and Director of the Laymen’s Home Missionary Movement, further expanding the work and republishing some of their existing publications.

Ralph M. Herzig (2004–2014) was elected as Executive Trustee and Director of the Laymen’s Home Missionary Movement in 2004, and assumed the office of General Editor of The Bible Standard and Present Truth magazines as well as overseeing the pilgrim service, which functions as a speakers bureau.

Leon J. Snyder (2014–Present) was elected as Executive Trustee and Director of the Laymen’s Home Missionary Movement in 2014, and assumed the office of General Editor of The Bible Standard and Present Truth magazines as well as overseeing the pilgrim service, which functions as a speakers bureau.

== Publications ==
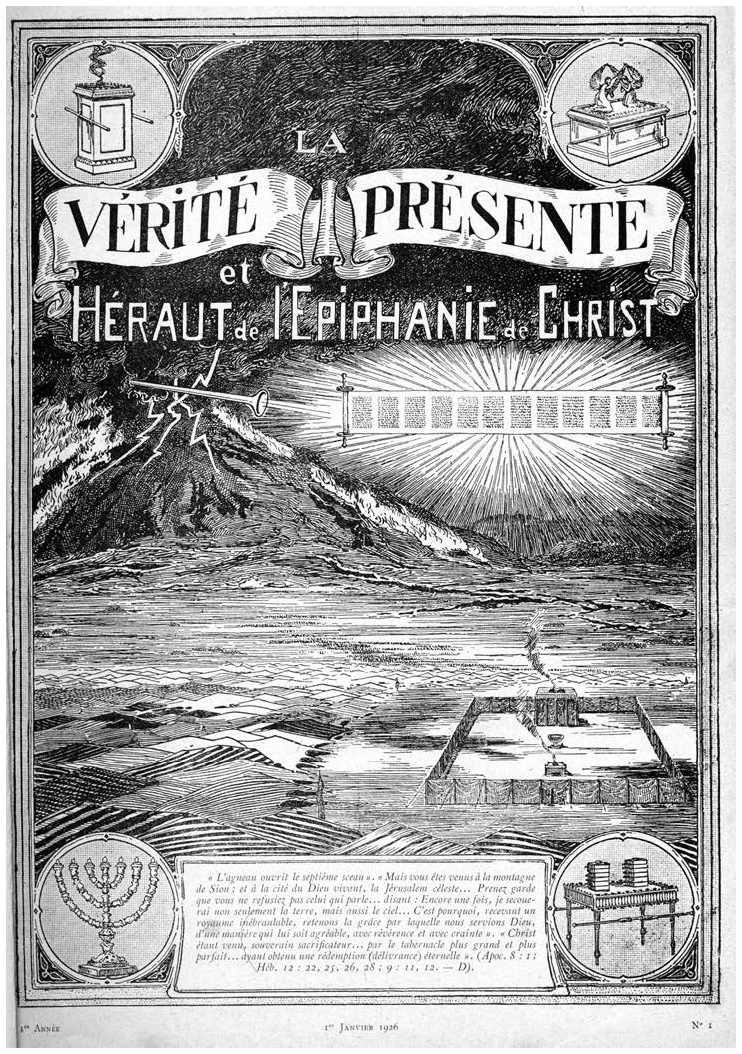
The Present Truth and Herald of Christ's Epiphany, (January 1926 no. 1) France

Currently, the LHMM publishes the six-volume series Studies in the Scriptures, written by Charles Taze Russell in the 1880s (see External links section).

It also publishes and makes available to the public the 17-volume set written by Professor Paul S.L. Johnson, Epiphany Studies in the Scriptures, as well as two magazines, the bi-monthly The Bible Standard and the quarterly The Present Truth, which are produced in about ten different languages. Their website "www.biblestandard.com" offers a look into their understanding of the Bible with various magazine articles, links to foreign LHMM sites, and an interactive button where Bible questions can be asked and answered. The Movement in 2005 has adopted the name Bible Standard Ministries as its working name for its public ministry, yet still functions as the L.H.M.M.
