= William Henry Conley =

Pittsburgh philanthropist and industrialist

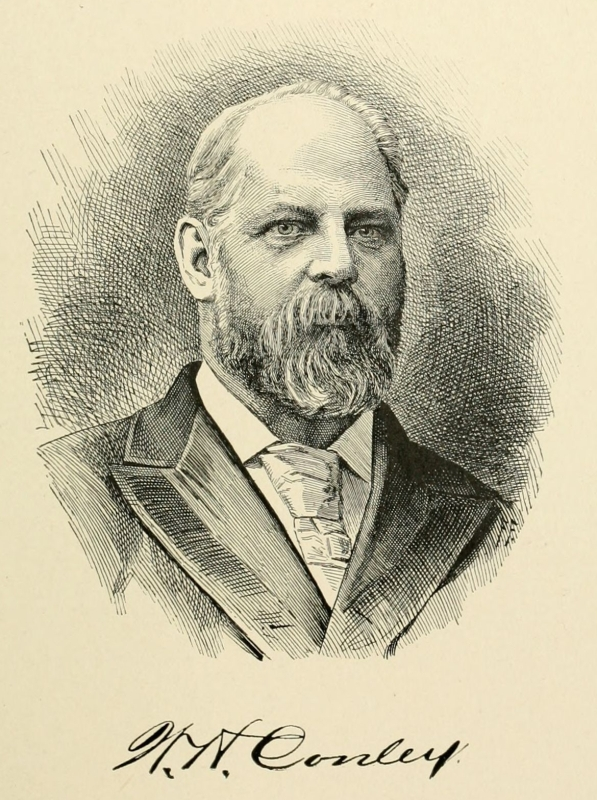
- Born: 11 June 1840; Pittsburgh, Pennsylvania
- Died: 25 July 1897 (aged 57)
- Occupations: Industrialist, philanthropist
- Spouse: Sarah Shaffer

William Henry Conley (11 June 1840 – 25 July 1897), was a Pittsburgh philanthropist and industrialist. He was married to Sarah Shaffer (1841–1908). Together, they provided organizational and financial support to religious institutions in the United States. William Conley was trained by his uncle in the printing business for ten years. Conley was co-owner of the Riter Conley Company, which provided steel and manufactured goods during the Second Industrial Revolution.

== Support for religious groups ==
=== Bethel Home Mission ===
The Conleys frequently held prayer meetings and events in their home ministry. The Conley home was sometimes kept open for weeks at a time in support of religious and charity efforts. According to Zion's Watch Tower, annual celebrations of the Memorial of Christ's death were held at the Conleys' home. Conley's home mission was described as Bethel (literally, "house of God"). The first recorded mention of Bethel in association with Conley appeared in 1890, in reference to the missionary house of Miss Lucy Dunne, established by William and Sarah Conley in Jerusalem.

=== Zion's Watch Tower Tract Society ===
Home of William Henry Conley

Conley was the first president of Zion's Watch Tower Tract Society, from 1881 to 1884. In December 1884, the Society was incorporated with Charles Taze Russell as president. In 1896, the Society was renamed Watch Tower Bible and Tract Society, and later became associated with Jehovah's Witnesses.

While president of the Society, Conley provided assistance for the three-volume series Theocratic Kingdom by George N. H. Peters; Peters dedicated the work partially to Conley, claiming to be "deeply indebted for sympathy and pecuniary aid in the prosecution and publication of the work." However, the May 1883 issue of Zion’s Watch Tower criticized Peters' work, recommending that readers not purchase the title.

In 1894 Russell introduced a letter from Conley by briefly referencing him as "a member of the early Allegheny Bible Class." Following Conley's death in July 1897, Zion's Watch Tower provided no obituary, nor any statement that specifically mentioned his name and his involvement with the Society. Watch Tower Society literature usually refers to Charles Taze Russell as the corporation's first president, but notes in Jehovah's Witnesses—Proclaimers of God's Kingdom that Conley was president prior to legal incorporation.

=== Christian and Missionary Alliance ===
Conley was a member of the board of managers of the non denominational Christian and Missionary Alliance (CMA), and was instrumental in funding and organizing it at local, state and national levels through the International Missionary Alliance (IMA). In 1889, Conley funded and organized the CMA mission in Jerusalem under control of his home mission which would later come under the auspices of the IMA and eventually the CMA. In the same year, the International Missionary Alliance was legally incorporated with W. H. Conley's $5000 contribution. The Pittsburgh branch of the Christian and Missionary Alliance was formally established in 1894. Conley was elected president of both the Pittsburgh branch and at the state level, an office which he retained until his death in 1897.

== Business and charitable interests ==
William Conley was director and a stockholder of the Third National Bank of Allegheny.

== Death ==
William Henry Conley contracted influenza (indicated in one obituary as "La Grippe") early in 1897, from which he never fully recovered. His health was relatively stable until June, at which time he suffered a relapse, after which he seldom left his home. He became bedridden in the last week of his life; on the evening of July 25, 1897, his health rapidly declined, and he died at about 8:30pm. A funeral service was conducted at his home in Pittsburgh.

William Conley was survived by his wife Sarah. After a period of prolonged illness, Sarah Conley died October 1, 1908. In honor of her husband's memory, Mrs Conley left much of her estate—estimated at a value of nearly $500,000 (current equivalent, about $17.92 million)—to the Wylie Avenue Church and the Pittsburg Bible Institute.

Preceded by None	President of Zion's Watch Tower Tract Society; February 16, 1881-December 15, 1884	Succeeded by Charles Taze Russell
