= Corporations of Jehovah's Witnesses =

List of corporations in use by Jehovah's Witnesses

Watch Tower Bible and Tract Society logo

A number of corporations are used by Jehovah's Witnesses. They publish literature and perform other operational and administrative functions, representing the interests of the religious organization. "The Society" has been used as a collective term for these corporations.

The oldest and most prominent of their corporation names, "Watch Tower Society", has also been used synonymously with the religious organization of Jehovah's Witnesses, even in their own literature. Particularly since 2000, Jehovah's Witnesses have maintained a distinction between their corporations and their religious organization. The primary corporations are operated by Governing Body "helpers" who implement its decisions.

== Watch Tower Bible and Tract Society of Pennsylvania ==
Watch Tower Bible and Tract Society of Pennsylvania is a non-stock, not-for-profit organization headquartered in Warwick, New York, United States. It is the main legal entity used worldwide by Jehovah's Witnesses, often referred to as "The Society". It holds the copyrights of most literature published by Jehovah's Witnesses. The society was founded in 1881 with William Henry Conley, a Pittsburgh businessman, as the first president and Charles Taze Russell as secretary-treasurer. The society was incorporated as Zion's Watch Tower Tract Society in Pennsylvania on December 15, 1884, with Russell as president. The corporation was officially renamed Watch Tower Bible and Tract Society in 1896; similar names had been in unofficial use since at least 1892.

=== Board of Directors ===
- President: Robert Louis Ciranko
- Vice-Presidents: Richard E. Devine, David W. Schafer
- Secretary-Treasurer: Danny L. Bland
- Other Directors: Enrique R. Ford, Robert V. Luccioni, Mark J. Noumair

=== Name changes ===
- Zion's Watch Tower Tract Society (1881–1896)
- Watch Tower Bible and Tract Society (1896–1955)
- Watch Tower Bible and Tract Society of Pennsylvania (since 1955)

== United States corporations ==
=== Watchtower Bible and Tract Society of New York, Inc. ===
Watchtower Bible and Tract Society of New York, Inc. is a corporation used by Jehovah's Witnesses which is responsible for administrative matters, such as real estate, especially within the United States. This corporation is typically cited as the publisher of Jehovah's Witnesses publications, though other publishers are sometimes cited. The corporation's stated purposes are: "Charitable, benevolent, scientific, historical, literary and religious purposes; the moral and mental improvement of men and women, the dissemination of Bible truths in various languages by means of the publication of tracts, pamphlets, papers and other religious documents, and for religious missionary work." In 2001, Newsday listed the Watch Tower Society as one of New York's forty richest corporations, with revenues exceeding $950 million.

Originally known as the Peoples Pulpit Association, the organization was incorporated in 1909 when the Society's principal offices moved to Brooklyn, New York. In 1939, it was renamed Watchtower Bible and Tract Society, Inc., and in 1956, the name was changed to Watchtower Bible and Tract Society of New York, Inc. Until 2000, a member of the Governing Body of Jehovah's Witnesses was president of both the Watch Tower (Pennsylvania) and Watchtower (New York) corporations, as well as Britain's International Bible Students Association corporation; in 2001, it was decided that the corporations' directors need not be members of the Governing Body.

==== Board of Directors ====
- President: Harold L. Corken
- Vice-Presidents: Anthony Griffin, John D. Larson
- Secretary-Treasurer: Mark L. Questell
- Assistant Secretary-Treasurers: Kent E. Fischer, Edgar Rene Llerena, Jesse V. Morris

=== Christian Congregation of Jehovah's Witnesses, Inc. ===
Christian Congregation of Jehovah's Witnesses, Inc. was established to organize and administer the congregational affairs of Jehovah's Witnesses in the United States. It filed for incorporation on August 21, 2000, in New York State as a "domestic non-profit corporation" in Putnam County, New York. An incorporation record was also filed with the State of Florida on March 3, 2006, as a "foreign non-profit corporation" with an agency in Collier County, Florida.

As announced to congregations in January 2001, the Christian Congregation of Jehovah's Witnesses is a corporation used by their United States branch committee, which oversees the preaching work of Jehovah's Witnesses in the United States, Bermuda, and the Turks and Caicos Islands. All branch committee members are appointed by and report to the Governing Body of Jehovah's Witnesses.

As with other agencies of Jehovah’s Witnesses, the Christian Congregation of Jehovah’s Witnesses may correspond directly with any circuit overseer, local body of elders, or individual, or it may assign someone else to communicate on its behalf. Any of these persons or groups may function as an agency acting at the explicit direction of the Governing Body.

==== Board of Directors ====
- President: Allen E. Shuster
- Vice-Presidents: Gary Breaux, Andrew Sciascia
- Secretary-Treasurer: Mark Turner
- Assistant Secretary-Treasurers: Keith Wolff, Richard L. Ashe, Jr., Thomas Jefferson, Jr.

=== Other US corporations ===
Reorganization in 2000 resulted in the creation of several additional corporate entities to serve the needs of the United States branch of Jehovah's Witnesses. Since then, most written communication with congregations and individuals in the United States involves the Christian Congregation of Jehovah's Witnesses, Inc.; other corporations include:

- Religious Order of Jehovah's Witnesses, New York, incorporated in 2000 for the administration of full-time preaching activities.
- Kingdom Support Services, Inc., New York, incorporated in 2000 for construction and fleet management.

== Corporations outside the United States ==
=== International Bible Students Association ===
The International Bible Students Association (IBSA) is a corporate not-for-profit organization used by Jehovah's Witnesses in the United Kingdom for the production and distribution of religious literature. Its stated purpose is "to promote the Christian religion by supporting congregations of Jehovah's Witnesses and others in connection with their spiritual and material welfare in Britain and abroad within the charitable purposes of the Association."

The IBSA was founded in 1914 as a corporation of the Bible Students by Charles Taze Russell in London, England, and was the first legal corporation representing Russell's ministry in Europe. The Watch Tower Society stated in 1917 that the IBSA, along with its Pennsylvania and New York based corporations "were organized for identical purposes and they harmoniously work together." Other similarly named corporations operate in various countries to promote the interests of Jehovah's Witnesses.

=== Other corporations ===
Many associated corporations have been formed around the world to further the interests of Jehovah's Witnesses, for example:

- Associação Torre de Vigia de Bíblias e Tratados (Brazil)
- Association cultuelle des Témoins de Jéhovah de France
- Los Testigos de Jehová en México
- Wachtturm Bibel- und Traktat-Gesellschaft der Zeugen Jehovas e. V., Selters/Taunus (Germany)
- Watchtower Bible & Tract Society Of Australia, Inc.
- Watch Tower Bible & Tract Society of The Philippines, Inc.

In some countries, Jehovah's Witnesses use the corporation name Christian Congregation of Jehovah's Witnesses or a similar name translated into the local language. In 2005, the branch office in Canada began using this name as a separate Canadian entity for most correspondence, while retaining Watch Tower Bible and Tract Society of Canada for other matters. In Mexico, the corporation, Congregación Cristiana de los Testigos de Jehová, is used. Literature of Jehovah's Witnesses has also referred to the denomination generally as the "Christian congregation of Jehovah's Witnesses".

== See also ==
- Jehovah's Witnesses beliefs
- Jehovah's Witnesses practices
- Organizational structure of Jehovah's Witnesses
