= Free Bible Students =

Christian movement

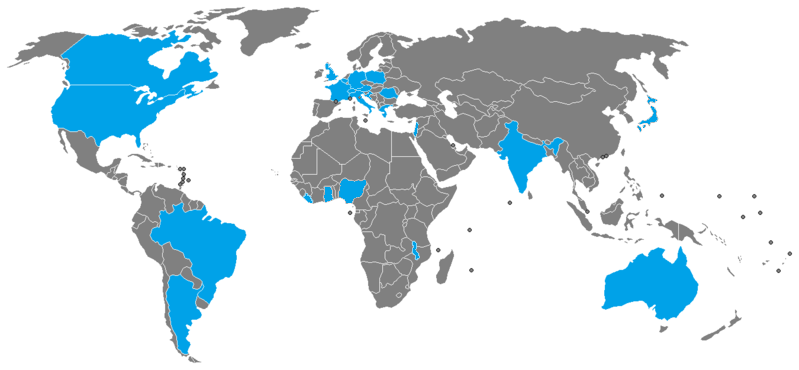
Free Bible Students in the world

The Free Bible Students is a branch of the Bible Student movement. The Free Bible Students form independent, autonomous assemblies and the name, "Free", is given to them to distinguish them from Bible Students, with whom they share historical roots. The group discarded many of the teachings of Bible Student founder Charles Taze Russell.

== History ==
In 1905 Paul S. L. Johnson, one of Russell's pilgrims and a former Lutheran minister, pointed out to Russell that his doctrines on the New Covenant had undergone a complete reversal: until 1880 he had taught that the New Covenant would be inaugurated only after the last of the 144,000 anointed Christians had been taken to heaven, but from 1881 he had written that it was already in force.

Russell reconsidered the question and in January 1907 wrote several Watch Tower articles not only reaffirming his 1880 position – that "the new covenant belongs exclusively to the coming age" – but adding that since the church was under no mediated covenant, it had no Mediator at all. Further, the church itself would join Christ as a joint Messiah and Mediator during the Millennium. Several prominent Bible Students vigorously opposed the new teaching.

=== New Covenant Believers ===
On October 24, 1909 former Society secretary-treasurer E.C. Henninges, who was by then the Australian branch manager of the International Bible Students Association, based in Melbourne, wrote Russell an open letter of protest trying to persuade him to abandon the teaching and calling on Bible Students to examine its legitimacy. When Russell refused, Henninges and most of the Melbourne congregation left Russell's movement to form the New Covenant Fellowship.

Hundreds out of the estimated 10,000 US Bible Students also left, including pilgrim M.L. McPhail, a member of the Chicago Bible Students and A. E. Williamson of Brooklyn. The dissidents formed the New Covenant Believers. In 1908 they began publishing The Kingdom Scribe, which ceased publication in 1975. Since 1956 they have published The Berean News, a small newsletter. The founding group is now known under the name Berean Bible Students Church in Lombard, Illinois.

=== Christian Millennial Fellowship ===
In 1928 the Italian Bible Students Association in Hartford, Connecticut withdrew their support from the Watch Tower Bible and Tract Society of Pennsylvania and in 1938 established the Christian Millennial Fellowship as a publishing arm for their ministry work. In 1940 they began publishing The New Creation, a Herald of God's Kingdom. The publishing house eventually reorganized and relocated to New Jersey, with branch offices in Australia, Austria, England, Ghana, Germany, India, Italy, Japan and Romania.

A few years later, Gaetano Boccaccio began to be influenced by the writings of E. C. Henninges and M. L. McPhail. The CMF eventually discarded most of Russell's writings as error. Gaetano Boccaccio was its leader since its inception, having been with the Society since 1917 and dying only in 1996. Today, the ministry work is now known as Christian Discipling Ministries International.

=== Free Bible Students Association ===
Conrad C. Binkele the former Branch Manager of Watchtower Society founded in 1928 the community of "Free Bible Students Association" in the German region with other brethren. He began publishing "Der Pilgrim" a religious magazine from 1930 to 1934. These efforts were all suspended around the advent of the Nazi regime. Members of this community were interned in the Nazi concentration camps under the "Purple Triangle" of the Bible Students. After the war, the Free Bible Students were again able to receive literature and the Mission again at startup.

All Christian of all this Missionworks they refer to themselves as "Free Bible Students", implying that they are no longer under the control of a man or organization. Unlike the Bible Students, they eventually discarded most of Watch Tower Society founder Charles Taze Russell's writings as error.

== Magazine ==
The New Creation is a bimonthly illustrated Christian magazine, printed and published via the Christian Discipling Ministries International in New Jersey and offices in Australia, Austria, England, Germany, Italy and Romania.

The first publication was started by 1940 under the title The New Creation and a Herald of God's Kingdom and has been distributed free of charge worldwide.

== See also ==
- Bible Student movement
