= Studies in the Scriptures =

Series of books for Bible study

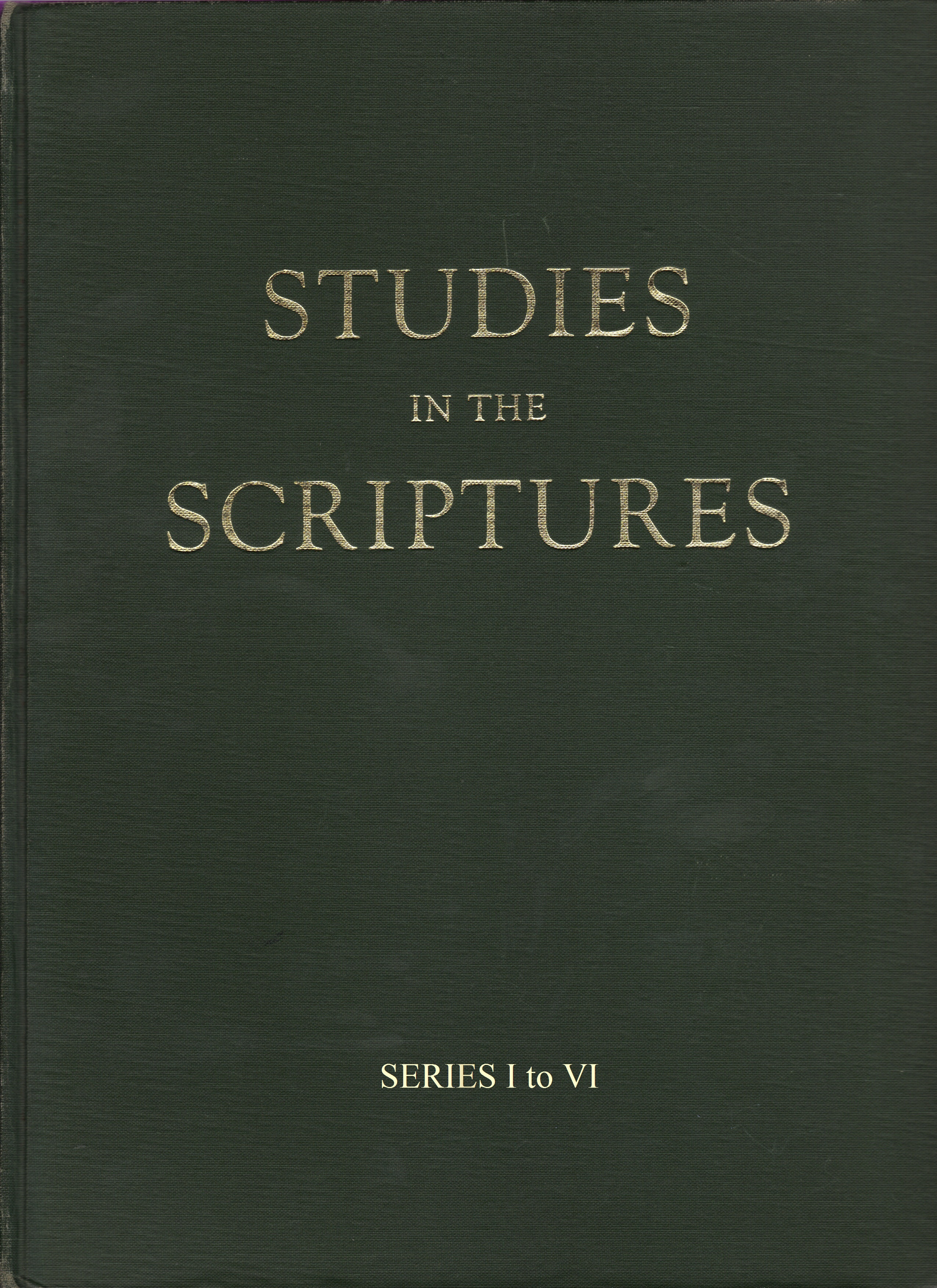
Studies in the Scriptures volumes 1–6

Studies in the Scriptures is a series of six volumes intended as a Bible study aid, significant to the Bible Student movement and the early history of Jehovah's Witnesses. A seventh volume was published posthumously and was written by other authors.

== Origin ==
The author of the first six volumes of Studies in the Scriptures, Charles Taze Russell, reported that he did not write them "through visions and dreams, nor by God's audible voice," but that he sought "to bring together these long scattered fragments of truth". The first volume was written in 1886. Originally entitled The Plan of the Ages as part of a series called Millennial Dawn, it was later renamed The Divine Plan of the Ages. The name Studies in the Scriptures was adopted in limited editions around October 1904 and was more generally used from 1906.

== Purpose ==
Chart from Divine Plan of the Ages, Studies in Scriptures Vol 1.

The series was written as a Bible study aid. Russell held that topical study was the best approach, rather than verse by verse. The series contains commentary about biblical events and expressions, and progresses from elementary topics such as the existence of God and promoting the Bible as God's word, to deeper subject matter throughout the series.

Russell did not claim infallibility, but declared that God's plan of salvation could not be understood independently from his writings. He stated, "if he then lays [Studies in the Scriptures] aside and ignores them and goes to the Bible alone, though he has understood his Bible for ten years, our experience shows that within two years he goes into darkness." Studies in the Scriptures claimed to represent that humankind had reached the end of the current era, and that Jesus would soon separate the wheat from the weeds.

== Contents ==
1. The Divine Plan of the Ages (1886)—interpretations of fundamental biblical topics associated with God's plan of salvation;
2. The Time is at Hand (1889)—an interpretation of biblical chronology, keys to time prophecies, the second advent of Christ, and the identification of the Antichrist;
3. Thy Kingdom Come (1891)—describes biblical prophecies in further detail, along with the fate of Israel and information on the Great Pyramid of Giza as being built under God's direction. The section on Pyramidology was influenced by the theories of Charles Piazzi Smyth, who also helped review it;
4. The Day of Vengeance (1897), later renamed The Battle of Armageddon—suggests causes of the dissolution of the present order, with the biblical remedy as God's kingdom;
5. The At-one-ment Between God and Man (1899)—discusses the nature of humanity, the work of redemption, and the Holy Spirit;
6. The New Creation (1904)—discusses the seven days of creation found in Genesis, and the duties and personal responsibilities of a Christian.

== The Finished Mystery ==
Russell had stated an intention to write a seventh volume of Studies, which would be a commentary on the books of Ezekiel and Revelation, as early as 1906. Following Russell's death in 1916, a seventh volume—entitled The Finished Mystery—was published in 1917 and advertised as his "posthumous work". This seventh volume was a detailed interpretation of the books of Ezekiel and Revelation, as well as the Song of Solomon. An advertisement for the book in Zion's Watch Tower called it "the true interpretation", and it was promoted as being "of the Lord—prepared under his guidance."

Immediate controversy surrounded both its publication and content. It was soon established that it was largely written and compiled by two of Russell's associates, Clayton J. Woodworth and George H. Fisher, and edited by Russell's successor, Joseph Franklin Rutherford.

== Legacy ==
The abandonment of several core doctrines under Rutherford's presidency prompted the Watch Tower and Bible Tract Society to cease publication of all seven volumes of Studies in the Scriptures in 1927, and distribution of remaining stock ended in 1929.

The six volumes of Studies in the Scriptures authored by Russell are still published by independent groups within the Bible Student movement.
