= Charles Taze Russell =

Founder of the Bible Student movement (1852–1916)

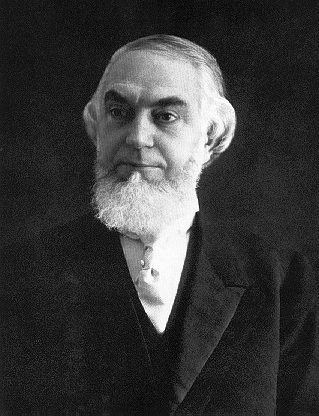
- Russell in 1915
- Born: February 16, 1852; Allegheny, Pennsylvania, US
- Died: October 31, 1916 (aged 64); Pampa, Texas, US
- Occupations: Writer; pastor

Charles Taze Russell (February 16, 1852– October 31, 1916), or Pastor Russell, was an American Adventist minister from Pittsburgh, Pennsylvania, and founder of the Bible Student movement.

In July 1879, Russell, an early Christian Zionist, began publishing a monthly religious magazine, Zion's Watch Tower and Herald of Christ's Presence. In 1881, he co-founded Zion's Watch Tower Tract Society with William Henry Conley as president. In 1884 the corporation was registered, with Russell as president. Russell wrote many articles, books, tracts, pamphlets and sermons, totaling approximately 50,000 pages. From 1886 to 1904, he published a six-volume Bible study series titled Millennial Dawn, later renamed Studies in the Scriptures, nearly 20 million copies of which were printed and distributed around the world in several languages during his lifetime. (A seventh volume was commissioned by his successor as society president, Joseph Rutherford, and published in 1917.) The Watch Tower Society ceased publication of Russell's writings in 1927, though his books are still published by several independent groups.

After Russell's death, a crisis surrounding Rutherford's leadership of the society culminated in a movement-wide schism. As many as three-quarters of the approximately 50,000 Bible Students associated in 1917 had left by 1931. This resulted in the formation of several groups with variations of the name Bible Students. Those who remained associated with the Watch Tower Society adopted the name Jehovah's witnesses in 1931, while those who severed ties with the Society formed their own groups including the Pastoral Bible Institute in 1918, the Laymen's Home Missionary Movement in 1919, and the Dawn Bible Students Association in 1929.

== Early life ==
Charles Taze Russell was born to Scotch-Irish Presbyterian parents, immigrant Joseph Lytle/Lytel /ˈlɪtəl/ Russell and Ann Eliza Birney, on February 16, 1852, in Allegheny, Pennsylvania. Russell was the second of five children, of whom two survived into adulthood. His mother died when he was nine years old.

The Russells lived for a time in Philadelphia before moving to Pittsburgh, where they became members of the Presbyterian Calvinist Church. When Charles was in his early teens, his father made him partner of his Pittsburgh haberdashery store. By age twelve, Russell was writing business contracts for customers and given charge of some of his father's other clothing stores. At age thirteen, Russell left the Presbyterian Church to join the Congregational Church. In his youth he was known to chalk Bible verses on fence boards and city sidewalks in an attempt to convert unbelievers; he particularly noted the punishment of hell awaiting the unfaithful.

At age sixteen, a discussion with a childhood friend on faults perceived in Christianity (such as contradictions in creeds, along with medieval traditions) led Russell to question his faith. He investigated various other religions, but concluded that they did not provide the answers he was seeking. In 1870, at age eighteen, he attended a presentation by Adventist minister Jonas Wendell. Russell later said that, although he had not entirely agreed with Wendell's arguments, the presentation had inspired him with a renewed zeal and belief that the Bible is the word of God.

== Marriage ==
On March 13, 1879, Russell married Maria Frances Ackley after a few months' acquaintance. The couple separated in 1897. Russell blamed the marriage breakup on disagreements over Maria Russell's insistence on a greater editorial role in Zion's Watch Tower magazine. A later court judgment noted that he had labelled the marriage "a mistake" three years before the dispute over her editorial ambitions had arisen.

Maria Russell filed a suit for legal separation in the Pennsylvania courts of common pleas at Pittsburgh in June 1903. In 1906 she filed for divorce under a claim of mental cruelty. She was granted a separation, with alimony, in 1908. Maria Russell died at the age of 88 in St. Petersburg, Florida, on March 12, 1938, from complications related to Hodgkin's disease.

== Ministry ==
Russell was a charismatic figure, but claimed no special revelation or vision for his teachings and no special authority on his own behalf. He stated that he did not seek to found a new denomination, but intended to gather together those who were seeking the truth of God's Word "during this harvest time". He wrote that the "clear unfolding of truth" within his teachings was due to "the simple fact that God's due time has come; and if I did not speak, and no other agent could be found, the very stones would cry out."

He viewed himself and all other Christians anointed with the Holy Spirit as "God's mouthpiece" and an ambassador of Christ. Later in his career he accepted without protest that many Bible Students viewed him as the "faithful and wise servant" of Matthew 24:45. After his death, the Watch Tower said that he had been made "ruler of all the Lord's goods".

=== Beginnings ===
About 1870, Russell and his father established a group with a number of acquaintances to undertake an analytical study of the Bible and the origins of Christian doctrine, creed, and tradition. The group, strongly influenced by the writings of Millerite Adventist ministers George Storrs and George Stetson, who were also frequent attendees, concluded that many of the primary doctrines of the established churches, including the Trinity, hellfire, and inherent immortality of the soul, were not substantiated by the scriptures.

Around January 1876, Russell received a copy of Nelson Barbour's Herald of the Morning in the mail. Barbour was an influential Adventist writer and publisher. Russell telegraphed Barbour to set up a meeting. Barbour and John Henry Paton visited in Allegheny in March 1876 at Russell's expense so that he could hear their arguments, and compare the conclusions that each side had made in their studies. Russell sponsored a speech by Barbour in St. George's Hall, Philadelphia in August 1876 and attended other lectures by Barbour.

Among the teachings Barbour introduced was the view that Christians who had died would be raised in April 1878. Russell, who had previously rejected prophetic chronology, was moved to devote his life to what he was convinced were now the last two years before the invisible, spiritual return of Christ. He sold his five clothing stores for approximately $300,000 (current value $9,070,000). With Russell's encouragement and financial backing, Barbour wrote an outline of their views in Three Worlds and the Harvest of This World, published in 1877. A text Russell had previously written, titled The Object and Manner of our Lord's Return, was published concurrently through the offices of the Herald of the Morning. Russell was eager to lead a Christian revival and called two separate meetings of Christian leaders in Pittsburgh. Russell's ideas, particularly stressing the imminence of the rapture and the second advent of Christ, were rejected both times.

=== Split with Barbour ===
A simplified chart of historical developments of major groups within Bible Students

When 1878 arrived, failure of the expected rapture brought great disappointment for Barbour and Russell, and their associates and readers. But one of Russell's associates claimed that Russell was not upset.

While talking with Russell about the events of 1878, I told him that Pittsburgh papers had reported he was on the Sixth Street bridge dressed in a white robe on the night of the Memorial of Christ's death, expecting to be taken to heaven together with many others. I asked him, "Is that correct?" Russell laughed heartily and said: "I was in bed that night between 10:30 and 11:00 pm. However, some of the more radical ones might have been there, but I was not. Neither did I expect to be taken to heaven at that time, for I felt there was much work to be done preaching the Kingdom message to the peoples of the earth before the church would be taken away.

— Alexander Hugh Macmillan

Confused by what was perceived to be an error in calculation, Russell re-examined the doctrine to see if he could determine whether it had biblical origins or was simply Christian tradition. He concluded that the doctrine was Christian tradition. Through the pages of the Herald, he wrote about what he had concluded on the subject. Barbour, embarrassed by the failure of their expectations, rejected Russell's explanation. They conducted a debate in successive issues of the journal from early 1878 to mid-1879. In a matter of months, Barbour changed some of the views which he and Russell had previously shared, and no longer relied on prophetic chronology. They began to debate over the issue of 'Christ's ransom', and the two eventually separated because of their disagreements.

Russell withdrew his financial support and started his own journal, Zion's Watch Tower and Herald of Christ's Presence, publishing his first issue in July 1879. Barbour formed the Church of the Strangers that same year, continuing to publish Herald of the Morning.

=== Watch Tower Society ===
In 1881, Russell founded Zion's Watch Tower Tract Society, with William Henry Conley as president and Russell as secretary-treasurer; they intended to disseminate tracts, papers, doctrinal treatises and Bibles. All materials were printed and bound by Russell's privately owned Tower Publishing Company for an agreed price, then distributed by colporteurs. The Society was incorporated in 1884, with Russell as president, and in 1886 its name was changed to Watch Tower Bible and Tract Society.

In 1908, Russell transferred the headquarters of the Watch Tower Bible and Tract Society to Brooklyn, New York where it remained until 2016, when it was relocated to Warwick, New York.

=== Publications ===
With the formation of the Watch Tower Society, Russell intensified his ministry. His Bible study group had grown to hundreds of local members, with followers throughout New England, the Virginias, Ohio, and elsewhere. They annually re-elected him "Pastor", and commonly referred to him as "Pastor Russell". Congregations that eventually formed in other nations also followed this tradition.

In 1881, Russell published his first work to gain wide distribution: Food for Thinking Christians. The 162-page "pamphlet" was published using donated funds amounting to approximately $40,000 (current value $1,334,483). It had a circulation of nearly 1.5 million copies over a period of four months distributed throughout the United States, Canada and Great Britain by various channels. During the same year he published Tabernacle and its Teachings which was quickly expanded and reissued as Tabernacle Shadows of the "Better Sacrifices", outlining his interpretation of the various animal sacrifices and tabernacle ceremonies instituted by Moses. Russell claimed that the distribution of these works and other tracts by the Watch Tower Society during 1881 exceeded by eight times that of the American Tract Society for the year 1880.

In 1903, newspapers began publishing his written sermons. These newspaper sermons were syndicated worldwide in as many as 4,000 newspapers, eventually reaching an estimated readership of some 15 million in the United States and Canada.

In 1910, the secular journal Overland Monthly calculated that by 1909, Russell's writings had become the most widely distributed, privately produced English-language works in the United States. It said that the entire corpus of his works were the third most circulated on earth, after the Bible and the Chinese Almanac. In 1912 The Continent, a Presbyterian journal, stated that in North America Russell's writings had achieved a greater circulation "than the combined circulation of the writings of all the priests and preachers in North America".

Russell also had many critics, and he was frequently described as a heretic in this period.

==== Studies in the Scriptures ====
Russell devoted nearly a tenth of his fortune, along with contributed funds, in publishing and distributing Food for Thinking Christians in 1881. That year he also published The Tabernacle and its Teachings and Tabernacle Shadows of the Better Sacrifices. In 1886, after reportedly not making back most of the money spent publishing these three titles, he began publication of what was intended to be a seven-volume series. The volumes were collectively called Millennial Dawn, later renamed Studies in the Scriptures to clarify that they were not novels. Russell published six volumes in the series:

- The Plan of the Ages – later renamed The Divine Plan of the Ages (1886)
- The Time is at Hand (1889)
- Thy Kingdom Come (1891)
- The Day of Vengeance – later renamed The Battle of Armageddon (1897)
- The At-one-ment Between God and Men (1899)
- The New Creation (1904)

The delayed publication of the seventh volume became a source of great anticipation and mystery among Bible Students. Following Russell's death in 1916, a seventh volume titled The Finished Mystery was published in 1917; this was advertised as his "posthumous work". This seventh volume was a detailed interpretation of the Book of Revelation, but also included interpretations of Ezekiel and the Song of Solomon. Controversy quickly surrounded both its publication and content. It soon became known that much of the contents were written and compiled by two of Russell's associates, Clayton J. Woodworth and George H. Fisher, and edited by Joseph Rutherford, by then the new president of the Watch Tower Society.

==== Photo Drama of Creation ====
Russell directed the production of a worldwide roadshow presentation titled The Photo-Drama of Creation, an innovative eight-hour religious film in four parts. It was the first major screenplay to incorporate synchronized sound, moving film, and color slides. Production began as early as 1912, and the Drama was introduced in 1914 by the Watch Tower Bible and Tract Society of Pennsylvania. A book by the same name was also published. The project's expenses put the organization under some financial pressures; the full cost was estimated at US$300,000 (current value $9,640,000).

== Theology and teachings ==
Following his examination of the Bible, Russell and other Bible Students came to regard Christian creeds and traditions as harmful errors. They saw their own work as restoring Christianity to the purity of its first century while many contemporary church leaders and scholars considered their views heretical. Russell agreed with other Protestants on the primacy of the Bible, and on justification by faith alone, but thought that errors had been introduced in interpretation. Russell agreed with many 19th-century Protestants, including Millerites, in the concept of a Great Apostasy that began in the first century AD. He also agreed with many other contemporary Protestants in belief in the imminent Second Coming of Christ, and in Armageddon.

Russell's scriptural interpretations differed from those of Catholics, and of many Protestants, in the following areas:

Chart from The Divine Plan of the Ages, (Studies in the Scriptures, Vol 1): The Chart of the Ages

- Hell. He said there was a heavenly resurrection of 144,000 righteous, as well as a "great multitude", but believed that the remainder of mankind slept in death, awaiting an earthly resurrection, rather than suffering in a literal Hell.
- The Trinity. Russell believed in the divinity of Christ, but differed from orthodoxy by teaching that Jesus had received that divinity as a gift from the Father after dying on the cross. He also taught that the Holy Spirit is not a person, but the manifestation of God's power.
- Christ's Second Coming. Russell believed that Christ had returned invisibly in October 1874, and that he had been ruling from heaven since that date. He believed that a "time of trouble" began then that would mark a gradual deterioration of civilized society leading up to the end of the "Gentile Times", with a climactic multi-national attack on a restored Israel, worldwide anarchy, and the sudden destruction of all world governments in October 1914. After the outbreak of World War I in July 1914, Russell reinterpreted 1914 as the beginning of Armageddon.
- Pyramidology. Following views first taught by Christian writers such as John Taylor (1781–1864), Charles Piazzi Smyth (1819–1900) and Joseph Seiss (1823–1904), Russell believed that the Great Pyramid of Giza was built by the Hebrews (associating them with the Hyksos) under God's direction, but to be understood only in the modern era. He adopted Seiss' terminology, referring to the pyramid as "the Bible in stone". He held that certain biblical texts, including Isaiah 19:19–20, prophesied a future understanding of the Great Pyramid. He believed that the pyramid's various ascending and descending passages represented biblical concepts such as the fall of man, the provision of the Mosaic Law, the death of Christ and the exultation of the saints in heaven. Calculations were based on the assumption that each inch of the various passages represented one year. Russell's Divine Plan of the Ages stated, "The Pyramid witnesses that the close of 1914 will be the beginning of the time of trouble such as was not since there was a nation—no, nor shall ever be afterward."
- Christian Zionism. Expanding on an idea suggested by Nelson Barbour, Russell taught as early as 1879 that God's favor had been restored to Jews as the result of a prophetic "double" which had ended in 1878 (favor from Jacob to Jesus, then disfavor from Jesus until 1878). In 1910, he conducted a meeting at the New York Hippodrome Theatre, with thousands of Jews attending. His teaching that Jews should not convert to Christianity shocked Jews and Christians alike. Russell believed that the land of Palestine belonged exclusively to the Jewish race, that God was then calling Jews back to their land, and that they would be the center of earthly leadership under God's Kingdom. Early in Russell's ministry, he speculated that the Jews might flock to Palestine and form their own nation by the year 1910. Shortly before his death in 1916, he used the Jewish press to stress that 1914 prophetically marked the time when Gentile nations no longer had earthly authority; he said that all Jews were, from that time onward, permitted and guided by God to gather to Palestine and to reclaim the land boldly for themselves.
- Spiritualism and the occult. "Russell attacked Spiritualism (which he called Spiritism)".

== Death ==
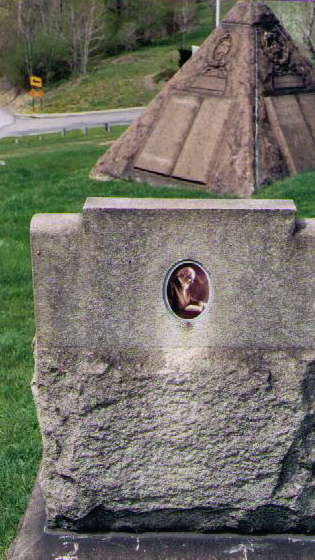
A pyramid memorial stood near Russell's gravesite in Pittsburgh, Pennsylvania until its removal in 2021

Russell's health declined markedly in the three years leading up to his death. During his final ministerial tour of the western and southwestern United States, he became increasingly ill with cystitis, but ignored advice to abandon the tour. Russell died on October 31, 1916, at age 64 near Pampa, Texas, while returning to Brooklyn by train.

An associate of Russell stated that Russell's body at age 64 was more worn out than that of his father who died at age 84. He was buried outside of Pittsburgh in United Cemetery, Ross Township, Pennsylvania. The gravesite is marked by a headstone. Nearby stood a 7-foot-tall (2.1 m) pyramid memorial erected by the Watch Tower Bible and Tract Society in 1921. The pyramid memorial was vandalized and subsequently removed in September 2021.

== Legacy ==
In January 1917, Joseph Franklin Rutherford was elected president of the Watch Tower Bible and Tract Society, despite disputes over the election process. Further disputes arose over interpretation of sections of Russell's will dealing with the future contents of Zion's Watch Tower magazine, as well as who, if anyone, had authority to print new literature. By the end of the 1920s, nearly three-quarters of the Bible Student congregations had rejected Rutherford's on-going changes in organizational structure, doctrinal interpretations, and congregational practices, some of which began to appear in material printed by the Watch Tower Bible and Tract Society as early as 1917. Many Bible Students were disaffected by Rutherford's rejection of Russell's views regarding his role in the restoration of the "truth" and support of the Great Pyramid as having been built under God's direction.

Those remaining supportive of Rutherford adopted the new name "Jehovah's witnesses" in 1931. They renamed their magazine as The Watchtower. Many of the most prominent Bible Students who had left the society held their own meeting in October 1929 to gather other dissenters; the First Annual Bible Students Reunion Convention was held in the old Pittsburgh "Bible House" long used by Russell. These conventions were held yearly, but the process of 'regathering' took nearly twenty years.

== Controversies ==
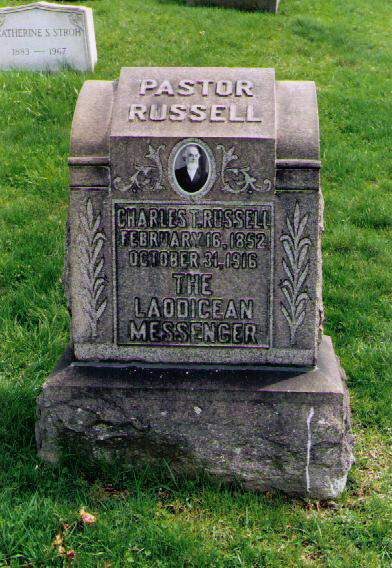
Russell's tombstone in Pittsburgh, Pennsylvania

=== Leadership style ===
As early as 1892, Russell's views and management style were strongly criticized by certain individuals associated with his ministry. In 1893, a paper was written and circulated to Bible Students in Pittsburgh by associates Otto van Zech, Elmer Bryan, J. B. Adamson, S. G. Rogers, Paul Koetitz, and others. It accused Russell of being a dictatorial leader, a shrewd businessman who appeared eager to collect funds from the selling of the Millennial Dawn books, of cheating one of them financially, and of issuing thousands of Millennial Dawn books under a female pseudonym.

Russell wrote a booklet A Conspiracy Exposed and Harvest Siftings in response, issuing it as an extra to the April 1894 Zion's Watch Tower magazine. He intended to pre-empt efforts by his critics to circulate their views to a wider audience of Bible Students. Russell printed copies of letters he had received from these former associates to show that their claims were false, and that those involved 'were guided by Satan in an attempt to subvert his work' as a "minister of the gospel".

=== Allegation of immoral conduct ===
In 1897, Russell's wife, Maria, left him after a disagreement over the management of Zion's Watch Tower magazine. According to Russell's successor Joseph Franklin Rutherford, she believed that, as his wife, she should have equal control over its administration and equal privilege in writing articles, preaching, and traveling abroad as his representative. In 1903, she filed for legal separation on the grounds of mental cruelty, referring to forced celibacy and frequent cold, indifferent treatment by him. The separation was granted in 1906, with Russell charged to pay alimony.

During the trial Mrs. Russell's attorney alleged that in 1894 Mr. Russell had engaged in "improper intimacy" with Rose Ball, by then a 25-year-old woman. The Russells had cared for her as a foster daughter said to be an orphan. Mrs. Russell alleged that Ball had told her Mr. Russell claimed to be an amorous "jellyfish floating around" to different women until someone responded to his advances. Mr. Russell denied the accusations and said he had never used such language to describe himself. According to Rutherford, Mrs. Russell testified that she was not accusing her husband of adultery.

The Washington Post and the Mission Friend of Chicago reprinted the "jellyfish" story while also accusing Russell of immoral conduct. Russell sued the papers for libel; the jury decided in his favor, awarding him one dollar. Following an appeal, Russell received a cash settlement of $15,000 (current value $537,000) plus court costs, and an agreement that the two papers publish his weekly syndicated sermons as well as a retraction defending his character.

Rose Ball later married and lived in Australia. As Rose Ball Henninges, she died November 22, 1950, at the age of 81 in Melbourne. For several years she had written articles for The People's Paper and was associated with the Bible Students in Australia until her death.

=== 'Miracle Wheat' ===
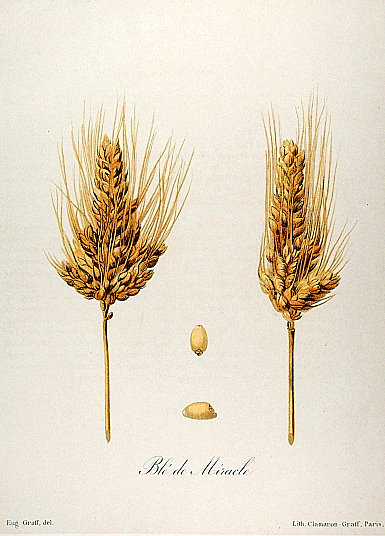
Miracle wheat (Triticum turgidum var. mirabile)

On March 22, 1911, The Brooklyn Daily Eagle reported that Russell was accused of gaining profit from a strain of wheat named "Miracle Wheat" by K.B. Stoner of Fincastle, Virginia, who claimed to have discovered this strain. Russell sold the wheat for $60 per bushel, far above the average cost of wheat at the time. Throughout 1912 and 1913, the Eagle continued to report on Russell's alleged fraud. Russell sued the Eagle for libel, but lost. A government expert investigated the "Miracle Wheat" and said it "was low in the Government tests". Prior to entering the court, the Eagle declared that "at the trial it will show that 'Pastor' Russell's religious cult is nothing more than a money-making scheme."

Russell defended himself publicly, and in writing, claiming that the wheat was donated to the Watch Tower Society. He said that although sold for $1 per pound, Mr. Stoner allegedly routinely sold it for a $1.25 per pound. Russell claimed to have no financial connection to the wheat, and said that no one claimed a refund although he had offered one for up to a year later for any who were dissatisfied with their purchase. In 1975, the Watch Tower Society stated that gross receipts from the "Miracle Wheat" fundraiser totaled "about $1800" (current value $62,000), of which "Russell himself did not get a penny". It also said that "the Society itself made no claim for the wheat on its own knowledge and the mo…ney received went as a donation into Christian missionary work."

=== Qualifications ===
In June 1912, Rev. J. J. Ross (1871–1935), Pastor of the James Street Baptist Church in Hamilton, Ontario, published and widely distributed a four-page leaflet titled Some Facts about the Self-Styled "Pastor" Charles T. Russell (of Millennial Dawn Fame). He alleged that Russell was involved in questionable business practices, had defrauded his estranged wife, and denounced his qualifications, legitimacy and moral example as a pastor. Russell sued Ross for defamatory libel on December 2, 1912.

After several delays the case came before Police Court Magistrate George H. Jelfs on March 17, 1913. During cross-examination Russell said that he had attended public school for seven years, having left when he was about fourteen years of age, after which he received instruction through private tutors. He said that he was versed in Latin terms "to an extent" but did not know Hebrew or Greek, that he had never been ordained by any bishop or minister, and had never attended a theological seminary or any schools of higher learning.

The Hamilton and Toronto, Ontario newspapers reported the claims made by Ross and provided a brief outline of the court proceedings. They did not refer to any alleged misconduct on the part of Russell. They criticized Ross for having fled Ontario when summoned and not being present during any of the court proceedings.

On April 1, 1913, the High Court of Ontario returned a verdict of "No Bill" ruling that Russell was not entitled to damages because, the libel was not likely to result in any violence within Canada. Following the libel case, Ross published an expanded edition of 48-pages titled, Some Facts and More Facts about the Self-Styled "Pastor" Charles T. Russell (of Millennial Dawn Fame). In this work, Ross claimed that during the proceedings on March 17, 1913, Russell had repeatedly lied under oath by affirming that he was ordained, but denying the same when cross-examined, by affirming that he knew the Greek language, but when shown by Counselor Staunton an extract from the New Testament in Greek by Westcott & Hort, he was unable to recognize it, and that he had not been divorced from his wife, but retracted the statement under cross-examination.

In response, Russell stated through various printed and public sources that he had never claimed knowledge of the Greek language, merely the alphabet and that early Christians were also criticized by the religious authorities for being unlearned and ignorant. He believed that his ordination was "of God" according to the biblical pattern, not requiring any denominational approval or theological training. He suggested that his annual election as "Pastor" by over 500 congregations worldwide constituted him as properly ordained. Russell contended that Ross and others were attacking him because they were unable to answer his theological arguments, preferring instead to resort to slander and character assassination.

=== Use of Masonic symbolism ===
Some have claimed that various symbols Russell employed in his published literature are Masonic in nature, and that such associations implied he engaged in occult activity. In later editions of the Studies in the Scriptures series a winged solar disk was stamped on the front cover, a symbol that is also associated with Freemasonry. However, Russell's use of the winged solar-disk originated from his understanding of Malachi 4:2, which denotes a sun with wings, as a symbol that Christ's millennial Kingdom had begun to emerge.

Some critics also claim that the pyramid that stood near Russell's gravesite was Masonic because of its shape and its use of the Cross and Crown symbol, although this remains disputed. The Grand Lodge of British Columbia and Yukon has said that Russell was not a Freemason, and notes that the symbols pre-date the fraternity.

In June 1913, during a transcontinental speaking tour, Russell lectured in a Masonic hall in San Francisco, saying:

Although I have never been a Mason… Something I do seems to be the same as Masons do, I don't know what it is; but they often give me all kinds of grips and I give them back, then I tell them I don't know anything about it except just a few grips that have come to me naturally.

Throughout his ministry he said that he believed Christian identity is incompatible with Freemasonry. He described Freemasonry, Knights of Pythias, Theosophy, and other such groups as "grievous evils" and "unclean".

== See also ==
- Back to the Bible Way

Preceded by William Henry Conley	President of Watch Tower Bible and Tract Society; December 15, 1884 – October 31, 1916	Succeeded by Joseph F. Rutherford
