= Unfulfilled Watch Tower Society predictions =

Watch Tower Society unfulfilled predictions

Watch Tower Bible and Tract Society publications have made various predictions about Christ's Second Coming and the advent of God's kingdom that have gone unfulfilled. Predictions about specific years up until 1925 were later reinterpreted as confirmation of the eschatological framework of the Bible Student movement and Jehovah's Witnesses, with many of the predicted events reinterpreted as having taken place invisibly. Starting in the late 1960s, further expectations were raised about the possibility of Armageddon occurring in 1975. The Watch Tower Society has occasionally acknowledged errors, which it said helped "sift" the unfaithful from its ranks, but says adherents remained confident that "God's Word" had not failed.

== Background ==
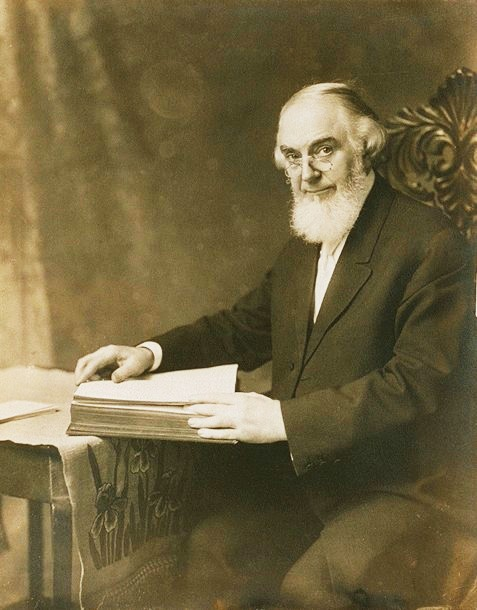
Former Watch Tower Society president Charles Taze Russell

Since its development in the 1870s and formal registration in 1884, the Watch Tower Bible and Tract Society has claimed God chose that organization from among the churches to fill a special role in the consummation of prophetic history. Charles Taze Russell, a prolific writer and founder of the Bible Student movement, viewed himself as a "mouthpiece" of God and later as the embodiment of the "faithful and wise servant" of the parable of Matthew 24:45-47. The Watch Tower Society is now the legal and administrative arm of Jehovah's Witnesses. Its representatives assert that they have been given insight into the true meaning of the Bible and the unique ability to discern the signs of Christ's second coming.

The group's early ideology centered on the "Divine Plan of Salvation", a biblically derived outline of humanity's history and destiny, which was believed to be open to fuller understanding in the "last days". The creed incorporated Adam's fall and the entry of sin, evil, and death into the world. God was believed to be permitting the world's affairs to run their course before he implemented his plan to free humanity from evil, suffering, and death by means of the sacrificial death of Jesus Christ and the later establishment of God's kingdom on earth after his Second Coming.

The kingdom would be inaugurated through two phases, one destructive, the other constructive. In the first phase, earthly institutions would be overturned in a tumultuous period known as the "Battle of Armageddon". For several decades the group believed the worldwide disintegration of the social order would take the form of a bloody struggle between the wealthy and laboring classes, resulting in terror and anarchy. This would be followed by an era of reconstruction, in which sickness, pain, and death would be removed and righteousness would triumph.

Prior to the establishment of the kingdom, a chosen "little flock" of 144,000 anointed Christians would undergo a physical transformation from physical to spiritual form to achieve immortality. Since 1925, the Society has taught that Armageddon will be a universal war waged by God, resulting in the slaughter of the unfaithful. With that doctrinal change, the focus of the movement's premillennialism changed from awaiting its collective escape from earth to waiting for the impending destruction of the present world order in the Battle of Armageddon.

To clarify its identity, the group, which came to form the Bible Student movement, formulated a body of historical doctrine, including a mythical self-history, which provided a comprehensive symbolic linkage with the past but also fortified the movement's expectations for the future.

== 1878: End of the harvest ==
In 1876, Russell adopted the belief promulgated by some Adventist preachers that Jesus' parousia, or presence, had begun in 1874 and that the gathering of the little flock preliminary to the grand climax was already in progress. Using a form of parallel dispensations that incorporated "types" and "antitypes"—historical situations that prefigured later periods—he calculated that the harvest would extend only to 1878, at which time the gathered saints would be translated into spirit form.

The failure of Russell's prediction did not significantly alter the movement's short-term, date-focused orientation. In early 1881 Russell asserted that 1878 had, indeed, been a milestone year, marking the point at which "the nominal Christian churches were cast off from God's favor". In 1889, Russell wrote that God's kingdom began to exercise power in heaven in 1878, and that it indicated the return of God's favor to the Jews.

== 1881: A revised end of the harvest ==
By 1881, Russell extended the harvest to a new date later that year. He explained:

Coming to the spring of 1878 [...] we naturally and not unreasonably expected some change of our condition, and all were more or less disappointed when nothing supernatural occurred. But our disappointment was brief, for we noticed that the Jewish church (and not the Gospel church) was the pattern of ours, and therefore we should not expect parallels to Pentecost or to anything which happened in the beginning of this church.

Russell wrote that "the light upon our pathway still shines and is more and more glorious" and that since 1878 the light had glowed stronger. The timing of their translation to heaven seemed nearer, he wrote: "We know not the day or hour, but expect it during 1881, possibly near the autumn where the parallels show the favor to Zion complete and due to end, the door to the marriage to shut, and the high calling to be the bride of Christ, to cease."

The failure of those new expectations precipitated a more serious crisis in the Bible Student ranks, and for several years Russell's followers waited for the belated translation to occur. Russell's chronological timetable had already identified 1914 as the ultimate end of the "time of trouble", and this preserved the commitment of followers who might have been discouraged by their failed expectations for 1881. Many members found it inconceivable that their earthly departure might be delayed that long.

Russell consoled members with the news that 1881 had still marked the time when "death became a blessing" in the sense that any saint who died would henceforth be instantaneously changed into a spirit being. The revised view provided comfort for early believers who had held the view that the living faithful would never experience physical death, even though other members died while they awaited their upward call. After 1881, physical death was defined as one of the ways in which some of the saints might undergo their translation.

== 1914: The end of human rulership ==
Russell's Studies in the Scriptures series had explicitly identified October 1914 as the "full end of the times of the Gentiles" and consequently the "farthest limit" of human rulership. It would bring the beginning of Christ's millennial reign and all his followers expected the immediate "translation of the saints" to rule with the revealed Christ that year. Following the earth's tribulation and unrest, the Jews would return to God's favor, the "nominal Church" would have fallen, the final battle between Christ and Satan would have ended, the kingdoms of the world would be overthrown, and Christ would have gathered his saints into heaven, where they would reign with him, and when the millennium would begin.

The belief was unequivocal, based on his study of the Bible and the Great Pyramid of Giza, and satisfied only upon the establishment of an earthly paradise. Russell remarked that altering the prophecy by even one year would destroy the perfect symmetry of its biblical chronology. In the second book of his Studies in the Scriptures series he described it as "an established truth that the final end of the kingdoms of this world, and the full establishment of the Kingdom of God, will be accomplished at the end of A.D. 1914". The result, he wrote, was that "all present governments will be overthrown and dissolved", along with the destruction of "what God calls Babylon, and what men call Christendom". In an 1894 Watch Tower article, responding to readers who questioned whether the world could last until 1914 in view of political upheavals at the time, he wrote:

We see no reason for changing the figures—nor could we change them if we would, They are, we believe, God's dates, not ours. But bear in mind that the end of 1914 is not the date for the beginning, but for the end of the time of the trouble.

As 1914 approached, excitement mounted over the expected "change" of anointed Christians. Early that year some Bible Students, convinced the end of the world had arrived, began distributing their belongings, abandoning their jobs and eagerly anticipating the future. In May 1914—five months from the expected end—Russell warned followers against succumbing to doubt:

There is absolutely no ground for Bible students to question that the consummation of this Gospel age is now even at the door, and that it will end as the Scriptures foretell in a great time of trouble such as never was since there was a nation. We see the participants in this great crisis banding themselves together [...] The great crisis, the great clash [...] that will consume the ecclesiastical heavens and the social earth, is very near.

By September, Russell was preparing his readership for the possibility that "Armageddon may begin next spring, yet it is purely speculation to attempt to say just when", adding that the evidence pointed "to the year just before us—particularly the early months".

When his expectations failed again, predictions were reverted to their earlier form. The Watch Tower stated: "It may be that many of the Lord's people were expecting more than they should have looked for to occur with the opening of the Jewish year 1915, which began with September 21. The human mind seems to have a natural tendency, and one with which we should have sympathy, to expect matters to culminate more rapidly, fulfillments to come more suddenly, than they ever do come [...] Studying God's Word, we have measured the 2520 years, the Seven symbolic Times, from that year 606 B.C. and have found that it reached down to October, 1914, as nearly as we were able to reckon. We did not say positively that this would be the year. We merely left every one to look at the facts of history and reckon for himself."

Russell took that opportunity to remind readers of earlier cautionary pronouncements. In 1912 he had left open the possibility that, if nothing happened in October 1914, it could still happen in October 1915. He also pointed out that the period of transition could run "a good many years".

In a lengthy article of consolation, Russell wrote that it was a testing time for Christ's disciples and that some Bible Students had unreal expectations. He said it was also possible that God's Kingdom on earth would be established gradually:

We find that some have one idea and others another. Some think that just the next hour after midnight would see a great, grand change everywhere—evil blotted out in sixty minutes or in sixty seconds. But would it be a reasonable expectation that the Gentile kingdoms would be snuffed out inside of an hour or inside of a day? If God had said so, it would be different; we know that God has all power to do His will everywhere. But are we in any sense of the word to expect such a sudden transition—that going to bed on the night of September 20, we would find, on the morning of September 21, all the kingdoms of the world destroyed and the Kingdom of Christ set up, the saints in glory, etc. Such would be a lightning change! We do not think that any would have been justified in so thinking. If any had such expectation, it was unwarranted.

On October 2, 1914, he entered the staff dining room at the Watch Tower Society headquarters and declared that the Gentile times had ended and that "their kings have had their day." It signaled that God had withdrawn his benevolent disposition towards the Christian nations. The statement implied that the legitimacy of earthly governments had been downgraded in the eyes of God, which sociologist Joseph Zygmunt suggested may have contributed to the subsequent adoption of bolder tactics in condemning the global political system.

Russell viewed the outbreak of World War I as the beginning of Armageddon, which would soon descend into worldwide revolution and in 1916, shortly before his death, he reaffirmed his conviction that the end was close and the harvest of saints was ongoing:

Some of us were quite strongly convinced that the Harvest would be ended by now, but our expectations must not be allowed to weigh anything as against the facts [...] We see no reason for doubting, therefore, that the Times of the Gentiles ended in October 1914; and that a few more years will witness their utter collapse and the full establishment of God's Kingdom in the hands of Messiah.

In posthumous editions of his Studies in the Scriptures, entire sections were rewritten to accommodate the failure of the anticipated events, with 1914 reidentified as "the beginning of the end of Gentile times", and the outbreak of World War I was taken as confirmation. Sociologist James Beckford wrote that Russell's "sometimes ingenious" ex post facto rationalizations of events in 1914 contributed to the survival of the Bible Student movement. Under doctrinal changes introduced by his successor, Joseph Franklin Rutherford, it was later decided that the Millennium would come within the generation of those who saw the events of 1914; the years 1799 and 1874, until then significant dates in Russell's millennial chronology, were also abandoned.

== 1918: The new terminus ==
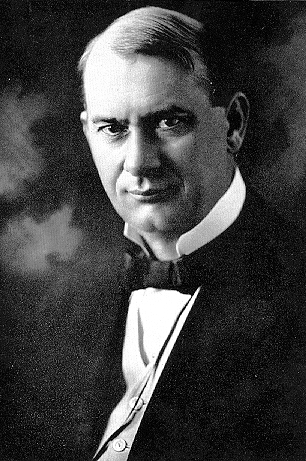
J.F. Rutherford

Russell's final revision of his predictions identified 1918 as the new terminus. The shift was based on the reasoning that the period of the Jews' favor may have lasted until 73 CE (the date of the Zealots' mass suicide at Masada), rather than 70 CE. For the modern-day parallel, the adjustment moved the conclusion of the 40-year "harvest period" from 1914 to the northern spring of 1918.

Rutherford claimed in 1917 that the testimony of Bible Students themselves confirmed that the harvest was not over: "Many have consecrated and given evidence of spirit-begetting since 1914, which is the best evidence that the harvest is not yet closed." If the new date was reliable, he wrote, "and the evidence is very conclusive that it is true, then we have only a few months in which to labor before the great night settles down when no man can work."

The Finished Mystery, written soon after Russell's death by two prominent Bible Students and published in 1917, made a series of bold statements about the expected demise of "false" Christianity. The spring of 1918, it said, would "bring upon Christendom a spasm of anguish greater even than that experienced in the Fall of 1914". God's day of vengeance, the book said, would "break like a furious morning storm in 1918", destroying "the churches wholesale and the church members by millions".

At that time there is every reason to believe the fallen angels will invade the minds of many of the Nominal Church people, driving them to exceedingly unwise conduct and leading to their destruction at the hands of the enraged masses, who will later be dragged to the same fate [...] In one short year, 1917–1918, the vast and complicated system of sectarianism reaches its zenith of power, only to be suddenly dashed into oblivion [...] One large part of the adherents of ecclesiasticism will die from pestilence and famine.

When 1918 also passed without any sign of fulfillment, the initial reaction was that the harvest had actually finished and that the full complement of those destined for translation to heaven had been assembled. The further delay in the arrival of the millennium was interpreted in 1919 as a sign that the loyalty and endurance of the "Kingdom class" were being tested and that God was finding fault with some supposedly sanctified people.

In a 1922 convention address, Rutherford retrospectively defined 1918 as the time when Christ "entered the temple for the purpose of judgment". He later wrote that it was only after 1918 that the Lord came to the temple, and that 1914 had marked the time when the heavenly part of God's kingdom was established with the birth of a "New Nation".

From that time the Bible Student group viewed itself as more than just an agency for completing the ranks of the 144,000 who would rule with Christ. With the "New Nation" already born, members were given a clear twofold purpose: (1) to recruit and train a "Great Company" who would be carried through Armageddon to live in the earthly kingdom and (2) to expose the machinations of the devil in trying to obstruct the kingdom's earthly establishment.

== 1925: Resurrection of the patriarchs ==
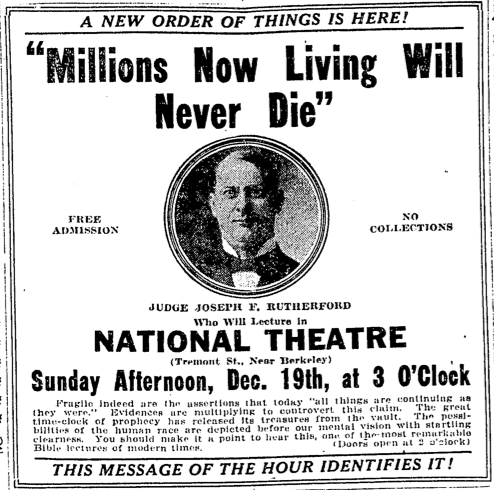
A newspaper advertisement for Rutherford's "Millions" lecture

With Rutherford now the movement's chief theologian, another round of prophetic revision ensued, this time focusing on 1925. In his 1920 booklet Millions Now Living Will Never Die, Rutherford wrote that he expected the ancient patriarchs and prophets, "the faithful ones of old", to be resurrected to earthly life in 1925 as a prelude to a general physical resurrection of faithful followers of God destined for everlasting life on earth. He explained:

This is the Golden Age of which the prophets prophesied and of which the Psalmist sang; and it is the privilege of the student of the divine Word today, by the eye of faith, to see that we are standing at the very portals of that blessed time! Let us look up and lift up our heads. Deliverance is at the door!

Rutherford's belief that the patriarchs' return would occur in 1925 was based on his calculations of the Jewish jubilee, counting forward 3500 years from 1575 BCE. As the year advanced, he wrote of the urgency of witnessing in the "few remaining months", though he also cautioned that some expected events might not occur. When that prediction failed, the Watch Tower Society suspended the issuing of prophecies about specific dates.

Researcher George Chryssides concluded: "This expectation was too specific and empirical for the date to be adjusted or the expected event spiritualised. At a convention the following year, Rutherford admitted his error, claiming that the 1925 date was 'merely an expressed opinion'." However, Rutherford did not completely abandon the concept. In 1929 the Watch Tower Society bought a plot of land in San Diego, California, where a Spanish mansion was built and named Beth Sarim ("house of the Princes").

As late as 1932, Rutherford was still delivering talks about the nearness of the kingdom. He declared that the preaching work of the Witnesses was "coming to a conclusion", that Armageddon was "only a short time away" and that the end was "much less than the length of a generation". In the late 1930s, Rutherford affirmed his intention that Beth Sarim should accommodate at least some of the returning "princes", and that it should stand as a monument to the organization's firm expectation, although no new date was ever assigned to the expected event. The building was sold in 1948 and the doctrine of the return of the prophets dropped in 1950.

== 1975: The worldwide jubilee ==
In 1966 the Watch Tower Society issued the first of a series of statements on the importance of a new date—1975—raising the possibility of Christ's millennial reign beginning in that year and, along with it, doom for unbelievers. (Note: In previous publications, the Watch Tower Society has established the notion that people who are not Jehovah's Witnesses may also survive to see the beginning of Christ's millennial reign. The May 1, 1954 release of The Watchtower mentions an "earthly resurrection" for the "unrighteous", which "will include those who did not know the way of service to Jehovah, but whose hearts could desire the principles of right". This "earthly resurrection" would take place after Armageddon.)

According to this trustworthy Bible chronology six thousand years from man's creation will end in 1975, and the seventh period of a thousand years of human history will begin in the fall of 1975. So six thousand years of man's existence on earth will soon be up, yes, within this generation. How appropriate it would be for Jehovah God to make of this coming seventh period of a thousand years a Sabbath period of rest and release, a great Jubilee sabbath for the proclaiming of liberty throughout the earth to all its inhabitants! [...] It would be according to the loving purpose of Jehovah God for the reign of Jesus Christ, the "Lord of the Sabbath", to run parallel with the seventh millennium of man's existence.

The hope centered on the Society's belief that Adam had been created in the northern autumn of 4026 BCE. The Society suggested that the close of the first 6000 years of human history could correspond with the end of God's "rest day"—with the transition marked by the Battle of Armageddon. In 1966, Frederick Franz, then vice-president of the society, initially indicated uncertainty:

Does it mean that God's rest day began in 4026? It could have. [...] [The] book does not say it did not [...] You can accept it or reject it [...] Does it mean that Armageddon is going to be finished [...] by 1975? It could! It could! All things are possible with God. Does it mean that Babylon the Great is going to go down by 1975? It could [...] But we are not saying.

Expectations for 1975 were also built on the belief that Christ had set up his kingdom in heaven in 1914 and that "this generation [those who were at least 15 years old in 1914, according to a 1968 Awake!] would by no means pass away" before the end came. The 1967 book, Did Man Get Here By Evolution Or By Creation?, similarly stated, "We find that the time of our generation, our day, is the one that is identified in the Bible as the 'last days'. In fact, we are actually living in the final part of that time. This can be compared, not just to the last day of a week, but rather, to the last part of that day".

A convention badge from a circuit assembly, c. 1970

In a 1969 book, the Society expanded on its belief in a link between the seventh millennium of human existence and the establishment of God's kingdom. It stated: "In order for the Lord Jesus Christ to be 'Lord of the sabbath day,' his thousand-year reign would have to be the seventh in a series of thousand-year periods or millenniums. Thus it would be a sabbatical reign." Raymond Franz, who became a member of the group's Governing Body before defecting in 1980, claimed readers were left in no doubt about what was expected in 1975, stating: "The presentation is in no sense indefinite or ambiguous."

The prophecy galvanized the Jehovah's Witness movement, and proselytism increased substantially. In 1974, the number of Witnesses involved in preaching rose by 13.5 percent worldwide and many Witnesses were actively preparing for the dawn of the New Order.

The possibility of Armageddon occurring in 1975 were initially described as "feasible", "apparent" or "appropriate", but from the end of 1968 it became a mere "possibility". In 1966 the Society characterized the chronological calculations as "trustworthy", but in 1968 were considered "reasonably accurate (but admittedly not infallible)". In May 1975, The Watchtower stated that there was uncertainty about what might take place that year because "we do not know how short was the time interval between Adam’s creation and the creation of Eve, at which point God’s rest day of seven thousand years began."

Dutch researcher Richard Singelenberg stated that from the end of 1968, Watch Tower Society publications did not explicitly focus on 1975 in a theological context. However, articles told readers that the "end of 6000 years of human history" was imminent, and increasingly reproduced reports from various sources that forecast worldwide famine and ecological collapse. The articles, says Singelenberg, featured emotional expressions of excitement, hope, and urgency, with readers told: "What a time of turmoil is ahead of us! A climax in man's history is imminent!"

Less cautious language appeared in publications distributed only to members of the group. In a 1968 issue of the monthly bulletin Kingdom Ministry, adherents were encouraged to increase their preaching activities because time was running out rapidly: "Less than a hundred months separate us from the end of 6000 years of man's history. What can you do in that time?" Some Witnesses sold their possessions, postponed surgery, or cashed in their insurance policies to prepare for Armageddon, and in May 1974, the Watch Tower Society told members: "Reports are heard of brothers selling their homes and property and planning to finish out the rest of their days in this old system in the pioneer service. Certainly, this is a fine way to spend the short time remaining before the wicked world's end."

Talks at congregation meetings and assemblies also disseminated the prediction. Speakers at some conventions highlighted the phrase "Stay alive till '75" and urged the audience to maintain their meeting attendance or risk losing their lives at Armageddon. The Dutch branch overseer urged the audience at a "Divine Purpose" district convention in 1974 to "pioneer" (take part in full-time preaching) as the end approached:

Many of us have suffered misery, sickness and death. You don't have to experience that any more. The new order is near [...] Sell your house, sell everything you own and say, oh boy, how long can I carry on with my private means. That long? Get rid of things! Pioneer! Plan to shower people with magazines during these last few months of this dying system of things!"

The Watchtower's public coverage of the same series of conventions expressed a more cautious tone. In its summary of the convention talks, the magazine reiterated the teaching that Bible chronology showed 6000 years of human existence would be completed in the mid-1970s, then pointed out: "These publications have never said that the world's end would come then. Nevertheless, there has been considerable individual speculation on the matter." What was certain, the magazine said, was that the end would come within the generation of those who saw the beginning of world tribulations in 1914. "So we can be confident that the end is near; we do not have the slightest doubt that God will bring it about [...] we have to wait and see exactly when, in the meantime keeping busy in God's service."

A 1968 Watchtower article implied that members should be careful about taking too literally Jesus' cautionary words about forecasting the last days. The magazine warned: "This is not the time to be toying with the words of Jesus that 'concerning that day and hour nobody knows [...] only the Father'. To the contrary: it is a time when one should be keenly aware that the end of this system of things is rapidly coming to its violent end."

In a 1970 paper, Joseph F. Zygmunt wrote about how failure of the prediction would likely affect Jehovah's Witnesses: "While return to this old strategy would seem to expose the sect once again to prophetic failure, the risks are balanced by the potent ideological reinforcement accruing from this forthright renewal of faith, which thirty-five years of diffuse watchful waiting seem to have made necessary." He added: "The risks of another prophetic failure actually appear to be minimal. The new prophecy is being phrased in a manner that lends itself to 'confirmation' by the old device of claiming partial supernatural fulfillment." Beckford, also expected no significant organizational disturbance as a result of no observable fulfillment that year, suggesting in 1975 that Witnesses were being "skilfully prepared for prophetic disconfirmation" to reduce disappointment. He noted an increasing frequency of Watch Tower Society warnings about the futility of making precise predictions about events expected for the jubilee year.

Singelenberg found that—amid the conflict of Watch Tower Society statements from the era about what might happen that year, its sense of urgency on a probable apocalyptic event, and later the possibility of a cataclysm—expectations of a significant event in 1975 had a "startling impact" on the proselytizing activities of Jehovah's Witnesses and on membership growth. His analysis of Watch Tower Society data from the Netherlands showed annual growth of "publishers", which had averaged 2.8 percent annually between 1961 and 1966, increased to between 10.4 and 12.4 percent from 1967 to 1975, with the number of active Witnesses through the 1970s peaking at almost 28,000 in November 1975. The number of average annual baptisms in the Netherlands more than doubled, from 750 to 1851, with the ratio of defections to recruitments plummeting. The percentage of "pioneers", Witnesses devoting at least 60 hours a month to preaching work, more than tripled from 2.3 percent of members to almost 8 percent in 1974 and 1975. He also identified increases in the number of "back calls", return visits to interested members of the public who purchased publications, and average hours spent in service by individuals in the same two years.

=== Aftermath ===
After 1975 passed without incident, Watch Tower Society leaders embarked on a lengthy period of denial, blaming rank-and-file membership for misreading the organization's interpretations. The Watchtower initially explained that Armageddon did not occur in 1975 due to the time between the creation of Adam and Eve. Although the Society had earlier argued that the gap was "weeks or months, not years", it now said the difference could be years.

In 1976 the magazine repeated that explanation but declared Witnesses themselves to blame for their expectations about 1975 because they had misread the Bible. "It was not the word of God that failed or deceived [the individual Jehovah's Witness] and brought disappointment, but [...] his own understanding was based on wrong premises." In talks at conventions four years later, leading members of the Society acknowledged their error in raising expectations about 1975, and in the March 15, 1980 issue of The Watchtower, the Society said its claims about 1975 were "to be regretted". It did not assign any new date and told members that there never was an explicit prophecy.

Singelenberg's analysis of Jehovah's Witness preaching activity in the Netherlands following the 1975 prophetic failure showed a decrease in the group's membership from mid-1976, a trend that did not reverse until 1980. An estimated 5,000 Witnesses in the Netherlands either left the movement, were expelled, or became marginal and inactive members. Singelenberg suggested many of those expelled and shunned in the late 1970s had rebelled against the group's authority structure out of "post-prophecy frustration". Post-1975 defectors were described to him and to American researcher A. J. Brose as "opportunists" who had joined the group out of fear when the end seemed imminent, but who lacked genuine commitment.

One elder told Singelenberg: "It was good that Armageddon did not take place. It separated the wheat from the chaff." Researcher Mathew N. Schmalz suggested the leadership drew attention from the disconfirmation by requiring even greater loyalty from members, a demand enforced with the expulsion of almost 30,000 Witnesses in 1978 alone. The insistence on doctrinal orthodoxy reached the highest levels of the organization in 1980, with many in the writing committee disfellowshipped.

In almost every country the annual growth rate of Jehovah's Witnesses fell markedly after the 1975 failure. In the US, the group's growth rate fell from 6 percent to 2 percent. In South Korea, it plummeted from 28 percent to 7 percent and the downward trend continued through to 1978. Even among the majority who remained, morale declined: in 1977 and 1978 the average "publisher" spent 140 hours a year proselytizing, compared to 196.8 hours in 1974.

In his ethnographic study of Jehovah's Witnesses, English sociologist Andrew Holden quoted the testimony of a Witness who had been in the movement from the early 1970s but found it impossible to continue after the failure of the 1975 prediction. He said that he, like many others, had been convinced the end would come in 1975:

I said it from the platform! We told everyone the end was near. When I became a Witness I gave up my insurance policies, I canceled all my insurance endowments, I never bought a house because I knew I wouldn't need one, we didn't even want to put the kids' names down for school.

== Armageddon within the 20th century ==
Watch Tower Society literature of the 1970s and 1980s repeatedly claimed that the "end" was expected before the turn of the century. The 1971 book The Nations Shall Know That I Am Jehovah–How? stated: "Shortly, within our twentieth century, the 'battle in the day of Jehovah' will begin against the modern antitype of Jerusalem, Christendom." A 1980 Watchtower article described the notion that "the wicked system of this world" would last "until the turn of the century" as "highly improbable in view of world trends and the fulfillment of Bible prophecy".

A similar statement in a 1984 Watchtower article suggested that some members of the 1914 generation "could survive until the end of the century. But there are many indications that 'the end' is much closer than that!" Until its October 22, 1995 issue, Awake! similarly included the statement, "this magazine builds confidence in the Creator's promise of a peaceful and secure new world before the generation that saw the events of 1914 passes away."

In 1989, the idea that the missionary efforts of the Witnesses would culminate before the turn of the century was first reaffirmed, then abandoned. As first published, a Watchtower article of January 1 stated: "The apostle Paul was spearheading the Christian missionary activity. He was also laying a foundation for a work that would be completed in our 20th century." Nine months later a more cautiously worded statement appeared in the Watchtower: "We have ample reasons to expect that this preaching will be completed in our time. Does that mean before the turn of a new month, a new year, a new decade, a new century? No human knows". In later bound volumes of the 1989 Watchtower magazines, the text of the January 1 article was emended to state that Christian missionary work "would be completed in our day" rather than "in our 20th century".

== Adherents' response to failed predictions ==
According to Joseph Zygmunt, the response to each of the prophetic failures by Watch Tower Society adherents followed a general pattern:

- The initial reaction by both rank and file and the movement's leaders was usually a combination of disappointment and confusion.
- Preaching declined, but members maintained a watchful attitude for predictions to materialize. The doctrinal bases for the prophecies were reexamined and conjectures offered as to why the expected events might have been "delayed".
- The group asserted that the prophecies had, in fact, been partially fulfilled, or that some event of prophetic significance—usually supernatural and unfalsifiable—had actually transpired on the nominated dates. Belief was sustained that God's plan was continuing to unfold.
- Unfulfilled portions of failed predictions were projected into the future by issuing re-dated predictions, in association with retrospective reinterpretation of earlier failures.
- Selective interpretation of emerging historical events as confirmation of the signs of the approaching end. A pessimistic worldview sensitized the group to perceive almost every social disturbance and natural disaster as an indicator of the impending collapse of the earthly system.

Zygmunt concluded that the group's faith in its own belief system provided a basis for the claim of fulfillment, and the selective perception of global events furnished supportive empirical evidence. "In this sense and to this extent," he wrote, "the prophecies could not 'fail'." Unfulfilled prophecies were converted into partial successes and welcomed as divinely provided lessons revealing God's purposes more fully, yet it was accepted that the prophecies would eventually come to pass.

Singelenberg, too, believed a subsequent reinterpretation of failed prophecies was a survival strategy of groups such as Jehovah's Witnesses. Citing Neil Wiser, he commented: "Whatever the outcome, prophecies cannot and do not fail for the committed."

The Watch Tower Society has acknowledged that some of its calculations and expectations resulted in "serious disappointments", with consequent defections, expulsions and opposition, which it claimed was a process of "sifting" true believers. Of those who remained faithful it said: "They certainly did not err in believing that God would without fail do what he had promised [...] They recognized that a mistake had been made but that in no respect had God's Word failed." Errors and speculation were attributed to an eagerness to see "the end of this evil system".

Holden concluded: "Simple as it seems, what sceptics regard as failure, the Governing Body regards as a test of faith." Holden said that given the scarcity of reference in Watch Tower Society literature to past predictive failures, it was highly unlikely that those who had joined the group within the past two decades were even aware of the Society's record. He estimated that more than 60 percent of current Witnesses had joined the movement since 1975, "hence the Governing Body has no reason to discuss with them the failure of its earlier prophecies." He added: "The suppression of the 1975 prophecy failure by those who were active at the time but who have nevertheless remained in membership suggests an unusual degree of complicity." He also concurred with researcher Bryan Wilson's judgment that:

For people whose lives have become dominated by one powerful expectation, and whose activities are dictated by what that belief requires, abandonment of faith because of disappointment about a date would usually be too traumatic an experience to contemplate.

== See also ==
- Unfulfilled Christian religious predictions
- Predictions and claims for the Second Coming of Christ
