= Eschatology of Jehovah's Witnesses =

Jehovah's Witnesses beliefs regarding the end of the world

The eschatology of Jehovah's Witnesses is central to their religious beliefs. They believe that Jesus Christ has been ruling in heaven as king since 1914, a date they believe was prophesied in Scripture, and that after that time a period of cleansing occurred, resulting in God's selection of the Bible Students associated with Charles Taze Russell to be his people in 1919. They believe the destruction of those who reject their message and thus willfully refuse to obey God will shortly take place at Armageddon, ensuring that the beginning of the new earthly society will be composed of willing subjects of that kingdom.

The group's doctrines surrounding 1914 are the legacy of claims regarding various years proposed in the Watch Tower Society's publications between 1879 and 1924. Many of the claims were successively abandoned. The Watch Tower Society has stated that its early leaders promoted "incomplete, even inaccurate concepts". The Governing Body of Jehovah's Witnesses says that, unlike Old Testament prophets, its interpretations of the Bible are not inspired or infallible. Witness publications say that Bible prophecies can be fully understood only after their fulfillment, citing examples of biblical figures who did not understand the meaning of prophecies they received. Watch Tower publications often cite Proverbs 4:18, "The path of the righteous ones is like the bright light that is getting lighter and lighter until the day is firmly established" (NWT) to support their view that there would be an increase in knowledge during "the time of the end", as mentioned in Daniel 12:4. Jehovah's Witnesses state that this increase in knowledge needs adjustments. Watch Tower publications also say that unfulfilled expectations are partly due to eagerness for God's Kingdom and that they do not call their core beliefs into question.

== Current beliefs ==
Jehovah's Witnesses teach the imminent end of the current world society, or "system of things" by God's judgment, leading to deliverance for the saved. This judgment will begin with false religion, which they identify as the "harlot", Babylon the Great, referred to in the Book of Revelation. They apply this designation to all other religions. They do not currently place their expectations on any specific date, but believe that various events will lead up to the end of this "system of things", culminating in Armageddon. Armageddon is understood to include the destruction of all earthly governments by God. After Armageddon, God will extend his heavenly kingdom to include earth.

They believe that after Armageddon, based on scriptures such as John 5:28, 29, the dead will gradually be resurrected to a "day of judgment" lasting for a thousand years. This judgment will be based on their actions after resurrection, not on past deeds. At the end of the thousand years a final test will take place when Satan is brought back to mislead perfect mankind. The result will be a fully tested, glorified human race.

=== Presence of Jesus Christ ===
Watch Tower Society publications teach that Jesus Christ returned invisibly and began to rule in heaven as king in October 1914. They state that the beginning of Christ's heavenly rule would seem worse initially for mankind because it starts with the casting out of Satan from heaven to the earth, which according to Revelation 12, would bring a brief period of "woe" to mankind. This woe will be reversed when Christ comes to destroy Satan's earthly organization, throwing Satan into the abyss and extending God's kingdom rule over the earth, over which Jesus reigns as God's appointed king. They believe the Greek word parousia, usually translated as "coming", is more accurately understood as an extended invisible "presence", perceived only by a series of "signs".

Witnesses base their beliefs about the significance of 1914 on the Watch Tower Society's interpretation of biblical chronology, which is hinged on their assertion that the Babylonian captivity and destruction of Jerusalem occurred in 607 BC. From this, they conclude that Daniel chapter 4 prophesied a period of 2,520 years, from 607 BC until 1914. They equate this period with the "Gentile Times" or "the appointed times of the nations," a phrase taken from Luke 21:24.

They believe that when the Babylonians conquered Jerusalem, the line of kings descended from David was interrupted, and that God's throne was "trampled on" from then until Jesus began ruling in October 1914. Secular historians date the event of Jerusalem's destruction to within a year of 587 BC. The Witnesses' alternative chronology produces a 20-year gap between the reigns of Neo-Babylonian Kings Amel-Marduk (rule ended 560 BC) and Nabonidus (rule began 555 BC) in addition to the intervening reigns of Neriglissar and Labashi-Marduk, despite the availability of contiguous cuneiform records.

They teach that after the war of Armageddon, Jesus will rule over earth as king for 1,000 years, after which he will hand all authority back to Jehovah.

=== Sign of "last days" ===
Jehovah's Witnesses teach that since October 1914, humanity has been living in a period of intense increased trouble known as "the last days", marked by war, disease, famine, earthquakes, and a progressive degeneration of morality. They believe their preaching is part of the sign, often alluding to the text of Matthew 24:14, "And this gospel of the kingdom shall be proclaimed in all the world as a witness to all nations. And then the end shall come." (MKJV)

They claim that various calamities in the modern world constitute proof of these beliefs, such as the outbreak of World War I in August 1914, the Spanish flu epidemic in May 1918, the onset of World War II in 1939, the terrorist attacks of September 11, 2001 and, more recently, the COVID-19 pandemic.

=== Judgment of religion ===
Jehovah's Witnesses believe that in 1918, Christ judged all world religions claiming to be Christian, and that after a period of eighteen months, among all groups and religions claiming to represent Christ, only the "Bible Students", from which Jehovah's Witnesses developed, met God's approval. Watch Tower Society publications claim that the world's other religions have misrepresented God, and filled the world with hatred. They identify "Babylon The Great" and the "mother of the harlots" referred to in Revelation 17:3–6 as the "world empire of false religion"

During the final great tribulation, all other religions will be destroyed by "crazed" member governments of the United Nations, acting under the direction of Jehovah. Witness publications identify the United Nations as the "beast" to whom the "ten kings" of Revelation 17:12,13 give their "power and authority."

== History of eschatology ==
The eschatological beliefs of Jehovah's Witnesses developed from those of the Bible Student movement, based on the teachings of Charles Taze Russell.

=== Background ===
Russell's eschatology developed out of the teachings of Nelson Barbour and other Adventists in the 1870s. Barbour and Russell taught that Christ had returned invisibly in 1874, that a “harvest” period would run from 1874 to 1914, and that key prophetic events were tied to 1878 and 1914. Russell retained these ideas after separating from Barbour in 1879, teaching that Christ became king in 1878, that the saints would progressively be resurrected and glorified, and that Armageddon and the full establishment of God's Kingdom would culminate around 1914. He also adopted pyramidology, believing the Great Pyramid of Giza confirmed prophetic dates such as 1874 and 1914.

=== Transition from Bible Student movement ===
After Russell's death in 1916, Joseph Franklin Rutherford became president of the Watch Tower Society in 1917 and gradually altered many of Russell's teachings. The 1917 publication The Finished Mystery raised expectations about the destruction of Christendom in 1918. In early 1918, Rutherford introduced the "Millions Now Living Will Never Die!" campaign, promoting 1925 as the year when various biblical “princes” would be resurrected to inaugurate a new order. In July 1920, Watch Tower magazine moved Christ's enthronement from 1878 to 1914.

After 1925, Rutherford continued to revise earlier chronology and doctrines. A 1927 Watch Tower dated the timing of the resurrection of the "saints" to 1918, explaining that they would be raised as spirit creatures to heavenly life to be with Christ there. In 1928, Russell's pyramidology was abandoned entirely and the Great Pyramid of Gizeh was redefined as satanic in origin. In 1929, the beginning of the "last days" was changed from 1799 to 1914, and by 1930 Christ's “presence” was also moved from 1874 to 1914. Christ's Second Advent was explained as "turning of attention" to the earth, with Christ remaining in heaven. The judgment of "Babylon the Great" was dated to 1919 with the publication of the book Light in 1930. By 1931, these cumulative revisions had significantly transformed Russell's original Bible Student framework into the doctrinal structure associated with Jehovah's Witnesses.

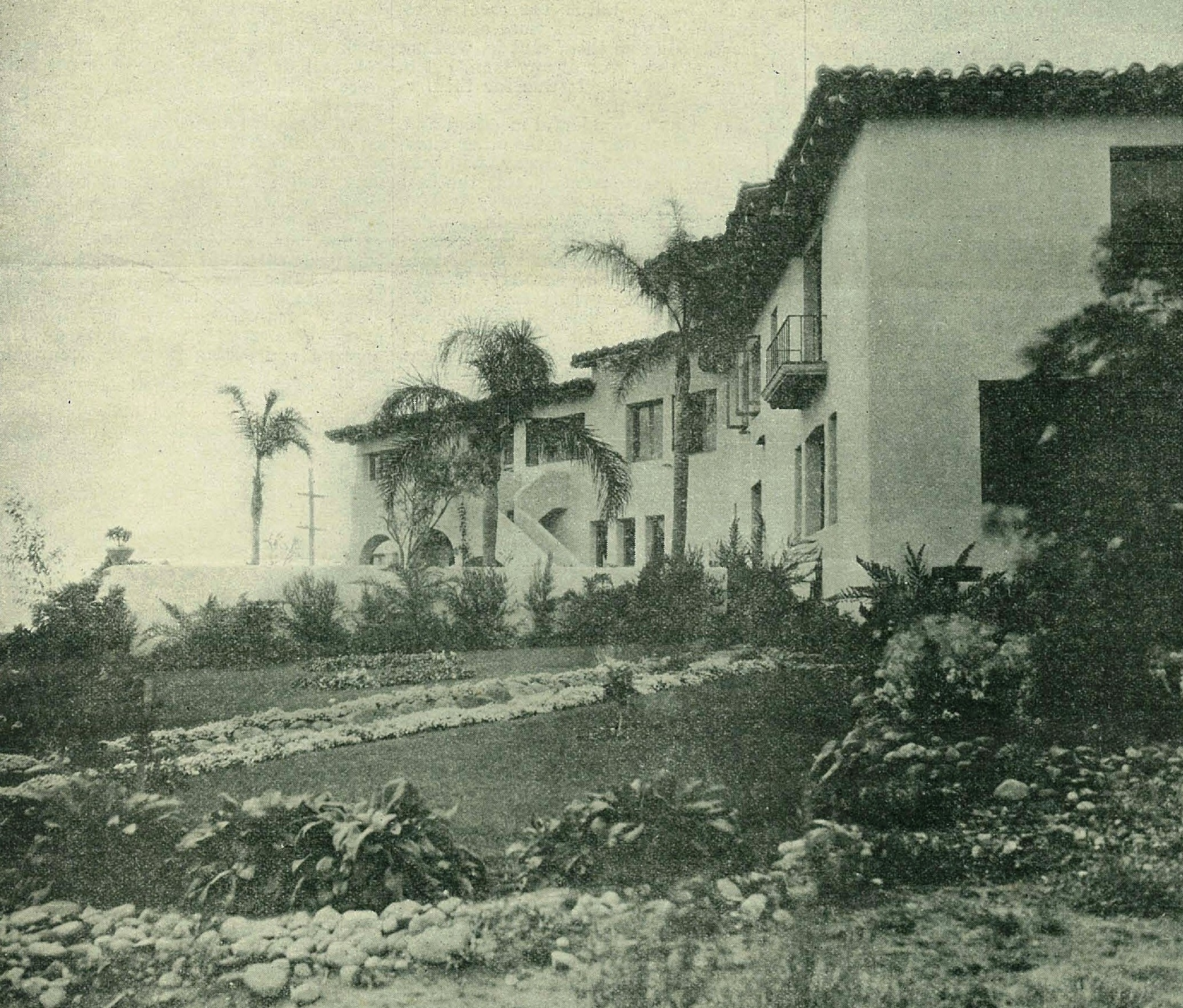
Beth Sarim (House of the Princes), built in San Diego, California in 1929 in anticipation of resurrected Old Testament "princes", was used by Watch Tower Society president Judge Rutherford as a winter home in the 1930s and early 1940s.

In the 1930s, Rutherford lived in a "Spanish mansion" in California which he called Beth Sarim, meaning, House of the Princes. It was held in trust for the ancient biblical "princes" who were expected to be resurrected immediately prior to Armageddon. Rutherford spent the winter months at Beth Sarim and died there in January, 1942. The belief that Old Testament "princes" would be resurrected before Armageddon was abandoned in 1950.

From the 1930s onward, Rutherford refrained from giving precise dates for Armageddon. In the mid-1930s and early 1940s, Watch Tower Society publications instead placed emphasis on the imminence of Armageddon, said to be "months" away and "immediately before us." Publications urged converts to remain single and childless because it was "immediately before Armageddon." Young Witnesses were counseled in 1943: "It is better and wiser for those of the Lord's 'other sheep' who hope to survive Armageddon and be given the divine mandate to fill the earth with a righteous offspring to defer matters until after the tribulation and destruction of Armageddon is past." This view was discarded in 1950. In 1969, the teaching that the "great tribulation" had begun in 1914 but was "cut short" in 1918—to be resumed at Armageddon—was also discarded.

=== "Looking Forward to 1975" (1966–1975) ===
During the late 1960s and early 1970s, Witnesses were instructed by means of articles in their literature and at their assemblies that Armageddon and Christ's thousand-year millennial reign could begin by 1975. Strong statements for 1975 appeared, sometimes accompanied with cautionary remarks. The booklet The Approaching Peace of a Thousand Years, which was the text of the keynote address to major assemblies of Jehovah's Witnesses throughout the world in 1969, stated about that promised reign (which would begin at "God's fixed time"):

For Godfearing students of the Holy Bible containing both the ancient Hebrew Scriptures and the Christian Greek Scriptures, there is a more important millennium that compels their attention. That is the seventh millennium ... the seventh millennium of man's existence here on earth ... Does this fact have any bearing on the approach of the peace of a thousand years or of a millennium? Very apparently Yes! ... More recently earnest researchers of the Holy Bible have made a recheck of its chronology. According to their calculations the six millenniums of mankind's life on earth would end in the mid-seventies. Thus the seventh millennium from man's creation by Jehovah God would begin within less than ten years. Apart from the global change that present-day world conditions indicate is fast getting near, the arrival of the seventh millennium of man's existence on earth suggests a gladsome change for war-stricken humankind ... In order for the Lord Jesus Christ to be "Lord even of the sabbath day," his thousand-year reign would have to be the seventh in a series of thousand-year periods or millenniums. (Matthew 12:8, AV) Thus it would be a sabbatic reign ... Would not, then, the end of six millenniums of mankind's laborious enslavement under Satan the Devil be the fitting time for Jehovah God to usher in a Sabbath millennium for all his human creatures? Yes, indeed! And his King Jesus Christ will be Lord of that Sabbath.

In 1968, a Watchtower article asked: "Why Are You Looking Forward to 1975?":

Are we to assume from this study that the battle of Armageddon will be all over by the autumn of 1975, and the long-looked-for thousand-year reign of Christ will begin by then? Possibly, but we wait to see how closely the seventh thousand-year period of man's existence coincides with the sabbathlike thousand-year reign of Christ. If these two periods run parallel with each other as to the calendar year, it will not be by mere chance or accident but will be according to Jehovah's loving and timely purposes.

Young Witnesses were advised in 1969 to avoid careers requiring lengthy periods of schooling and a 1974 issue of the Kingdom Ministry newsletter commended Witnesses who had sold their homes and property to engage in full-time preaching, adding: "Certainly this is a fine way to spend the short time remaining before the wicked world's end."

In a lecture in early 1975, then vice president Fred Franz selected sundown on September 5, 1975, as the end of 6000 years of human history, but cautioned that although the prophecies "could happen" by then, it looked improbable. After 1975 passed without any sign of the expected paradise, The Watchtower described as "unwise" the actions of some Witnesses who had made radical changes in their lives, commenting: "It may be that some who have been serving God have planned their lives according to a mistaken view of just what was to happen on a certain date or in a certain year. They may have, for this reason, put off or neglected things that they otherwise would have cared for ... But it is not advisable for us to set our sights on a certain date, neglecting everyday things we would ordinarily care for as Christians, such as things that we and our families really need." In 1979, in a lecture entitled "Choosing the Best Way of Life", the Watch Tower Society acknowledged responsibility for much of the disappointment around 1975. The following year, a Watchtower article admitted that the leaders of Jehovah's Witnesses had erred in "setting dates for the desired liberation from the suffering and troubles that are the lot of persons throughout the earth", and that the Life Everlasting book (1966) had led to "considerable expectation" for 1975, with subsequent statements "that implied that such realization of hopes by that year was more of a probability than a mere possibility." The article added, "It is to be regretted that these latter statements apparently overshadowed the cautionary ones and contributed to a buildup of the expectation already initiated".

Baptism statistics compared with the number of those reporting preaching for 1976–80 showed that many became inactive during that period.

=== The "generation of 1914" (1976–present) ===
History of Eschatological Doctrine
	Last Days begin	Start of Christ's Presence	Christ made King	Resurrection of 144,000	Judgment of Religion	Separating Sheep & Goats	Great Tribulation
1879–1920	1799	1874	1878			during Millennium	1914, 1915, 1918, 1920
1920–1923	1799	1874	1914	1878	1878	during Millennium	1925
1923–1925	1799	1874	1914	1878	1878	during Christ's presence	1925
1925–1927	1799	1874	1914	1878	1878	during Christ's presence	within generation of 1914
1927–1929	1799	1874	1914	1918	1878	during Christ's presence	within generation of 1914
1929–1930	1914	1874	1914	1918	1878	during Christ's presence	within generation of 1914
1930–1966	1914			1918	1919	during Christ's presence	within generation of 1914
1966–1975	1914			1918	1919	during Christ's presence	1975?
1975–1995	1914			1918	1919	during Christ's presence	within generation of 1914
1995–present	1914			1918	1919	during Great Tribulation	imminent

After the passing of 1975, the Watch Tower Society continued to emphasize the teaching that God would execute his judgment on humankind before the generation of people who had witnessed the events of 1914 had all died. This teaching was based on an interpretation of Matthew 24:34 ("Truly I say to you that this generation will by no means pass away until all these things occur"), with the term "a generation" said to refer "beyond question" to a generation living in a given period.

The term had been used with regard to the nearness of Armageddon from the 1940s, when the view was that "a generation" covered a period of about 30 to 40 years. As the 40-year deadline passed without Armageddon occurring, the definition of "a generation" underwent a series of changes: in 1952 it was said for the first time to mean an entire lifetime, possibly 80 years or more; in 1968 it was applied to those who had been at least 15 years old in 1914, who were considered to be "old enough to witness with understanding what took place when the 'last days' began" (italics theirs). In 1980 the starting date for that "generation" was brought into the 20th century when the term was applied to those who had been born in 1904 and therefore aged 10 and able simply "to observe" when World War I had begun. The Watchtower commented: "The fact that their number is dwindling is one more indication that 'the conclusion of the system of things' is moving fast toward its end."

From 1982 to 1995, the inside cover of Awake! magazine included, in its mission statement, a reference to the "generation of 1914", alluding to "the Creator's promise ... of a peaceful and secure new world before the generation that saw the events of 1914 passes away." In 1985, Witnesses were reminded: "The 1914 generation is well into the evening of its existence, thus allowing only little time for this prophecy yet to be fulfilled.".

Former Governing Body member Raymond Franz claimed members of the Governing Body of Jehovah's Witnesses debated replacing the doctrine with a markedly different interpretation and that in 1980 Albert Schroeder, Karl Klein and Grant Suiter proposed moving the beginning of the "generation" to the year 1957, to coincide with the year Sputnik was launched. He said the proposal was rejected by the rest of the Governing Body.

Despite its earlier description as being "beyond question", the "generation of 1914" teaching was discarded in 1995. Rather than a literal lifespan of 70 to 80 years, the definition of "generation" was changed to "contemporary people of a certain historical period, with their identifying characteristics," without reference to any specific amount of time. This class of people was described as "the peoples of earth who see the sign of Christ's presence but fail to mend their ways". Mention of 1914 was dropped from Awake! magazine's mission statement as of November 8, 1995. The Watchtower insisted, however, that Armageddon was still imminent, asking: "Does our more precise viewpoint on 'this generation' mean that Armageddon is further away than we had thought? Not at all!"

In 2008, the "generation" teaching was again altered, and the term was used to refer to the "anointed" believers, some of whom would still be alive on earth when the great tribulation begins. This was a return to a belief previously held between 1927 and 1950 when the teaching of the "generation of 1914" not passing away was adopted.

In 2010, the teaching of the "generation" was modified again, to refer to "the anointed who were on hand when the sign began to become evident in 1914" and other "anointed" members whose lives "overlap" with the first group. In 2015, it was asserted that the "generation" would include any individuals "anointed" up until 1992 at the earliest.

== Controversy ==
=== Fall of Jerusalem ===
Jehovah's Witnesses assert that Jerusalem was destroyed by the Babylonians in 607 BC and completely uninhabited for exactly seventy years. This date is critical to their selection of October 1914 for the arrival of Christ in kingly power—2520 years after October 607 BC. Non-Witness scholars do not support 607 BC for the event; most scholars date the destruction of Jerusalem to within a year of 587 BC, twenty years later. Jehovah's Witnesses believe that periods of seventy years mentioned in the books of Jeremiah and Daniel refer to the Babylonian exile of Jews. They also believe that the gathering of Jews in Jerusalem, shortly after their return from Babylon, officially ended the exile in Jewish month of Tishrei (Ezra 3:1). According to the Watch Tower Society, October 607 BC is derived by counting back seventy years from Tishrei of 537 BC, based on their belief that Cyrus' decree to release the Jews during his first regnal year "may have been made in late 538 B.C. or before March 4–5, 537 B.C." Non-Witness sources assign the return to either 538 BC or 537 BC.

In The Gentile Times Reconsidered: Chronology & Christ's Return, Carl O. Jonsson, a former Witness, presents eighteen lines of evidence to support the traditional view of neo-Babylonian chronology. He accuses the Watch Tower Society of deliberately misquoting sources in an effort to bolster their position. The Watch Tower Society claims that biblical chronology is not always compatible with secular sources, and that the Bible is superior. It claims that secular historians make conclusions about 587 BC based on incorrect or inconsistent historical records, but accepts those sources that identify Cyrus' capture of Babylon in 539 BC, claiming it has no evidence of being inconsistent and hence can be used as a pivotal date.

In 2003, Rolf Furuli—a lecturer in Semitic languages and a member of the denomination at the time—presented a study of 607 BC in support of the Witnesses' conclusions in Assyrian, Babylonian, Egyptian, and Persian Chronology Compared with the Chronology of the Bible, Volume 1: Persian Chronology and the Length of the Babylonian Exile of the Jews. Lester L. Grabbe, professor of theology at the University of Hull, said of Furuli's study: "Once again we have an amateur who wants to rewrite scholarship. ... F. shows little evidence of having put his theories to the test with specialists in Mesopotamian astronomy and Persian history."

== See also ==
- Unfulfilled Watch Tower Society predictions

== Bibliography ==
- Penton, M. James (1985). Apocalypse Delayed: The Story of Jehovah's Witnesses. Toronto: University of Toronto Press. ISBN 978-0-8020-7973-2.
