= Watch Tower Society presidency dispute =

A dispute developed in 1917 within the leadership of the Watch Tower Bible and Tract Society following the death of society president Charles Taze Russell and the election of legal counsel Joseph Franklin Rutherford as his successor. An acrimonious battle ensued between Rutherford and four of the society's seven directors, who accused him of autocratic behavior and sought to reduce his powers. Rutherford claimed the dissident directors had formed a conspiracy to seize control of the society and overcame the challenge by gaining a legal opinion that his four opposers had not been legally appointed. He subsequently replaced them with four new sympathetic directors.

The four ousted directors later gained 12 legal opinions that Rutherford's actions were unlawful. The leadership crisis divided the Bible Student community and helped contribute to the loss of one-seventh of the Watch Tower adherents by 1919.

== Origins of the dispute ==
Watch Tower Society president Charles Taze Russell died on October 31, 1916, in Pampa, Texas, during a cross-country preaching trip. On January 6, 1917, Joseph Rutherford, aged 47, was elected president of the Watch Tower Society, unopposed, at a convention in Pittsburgh. Controversy soon followed. Author Tony Wills claims that nominations were suspended once Rutherford had been nominated, preventing votes for other candidates, and within months Rutherford felt the need to defend himself against rumors within the Brooklyn headquarters that he had used "political methods" to secure his election. In the first of a series of pamphlets from opposing sides, Rutherford told Bible Students: "There is no person on earth who can truthfully say that I ever asked them directly or indirectly to vote for me." By June, the dispute surrounding Rutherford's election as president was turning into what he called a "storm" that ruptured the Watch Tower Society for the remainder of 1917.

In January 1917, Bethel pilgrim Paul S. L. Johnson had been sent to England with orders to inspect the management and finances of the Watch Tower Society's London corporation. He dismissed two managers of the corporation, seized its funds, and attempted to reorganize the body. Rutherford—who was convinced Johnson was insane and suffering religious delusions—ordered his recall to New York in late February, but Johnson refused and claimed he was answerable only to the full board of directors. When he finally returned to New York and apologized to the Bethel family for his excesses in London, Johnson became caught up in a move against Rutherford by four of the seven Watch Tower Society directors.

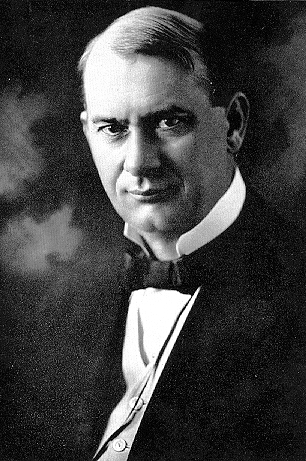
Joseph F. Rutherford c. 1910

At issue were new by-laws that had been passed in January by both the Pittsburgh convention and the board of directors, stating that the president would be the executive officer and general manager of the Watch Tower Society, giving him full charge of its affairs worldwide. Opinions on the need for the by-laws were sharply divided. Rutherford maintained that Russell, as president, had always acted as the society's manager and that the January 6 vote by shareholders to approve the by-laws proved they wanted this process to continue under his successor. He claimed it was a matter of efficiency and said the work of the Watch Tower Society "peculiarly requires the direction of one mind".

Bible Student Francis McGee, a lawyer and an assistant to the New Jersey Attorney-General, responded: "This is then the crux of the matter. He says he is that one mind." By June, four board members—Robert H. Hirsh, Alfred I. Ritchie, Isaac F. Hoskins, and James D. Wright—had decided they had erred in endorsing Rutherford's powers of management. They claimed Rutherford had become autocratic, refusing to open the Watch Tower Society's books for scrutiny and denying Johnson a fair hearing over his actions in London.

At a board meeting on June 20, Hirsh presented a resolution to rescind the new by-laws and reclaim the powers of management from the president, but a vote was deferred for a month after strenuous objections by Rutherford. A week later, four of the directors requested an immediate board meeting to seek information on the society's finances. Rutherford refused the meeting, later claiming he had by then detected a conspiracy between Johnson and the four directors with the aim of seizing control of the society, as he believed Johnson had attempted in Britain.

Within weeks, Rutherford gained a legal opinion from a Philadelphia corporation lawyer that a clause of the Watch Tower Society charter stipulating that its directors were elected for life was contrary to Pennsylvania law, and that all directors were required by law to be re-elected annually. The legal opinion stated that because the January 6 shareholders' meeting had elected only three men to office—Rutherford, Secretary-Treasurer Van Amburgh, and Vice-President Andrew N. Pierson—the remaining four board members, who had joined as early as 1904 and had not faced re-election, had no legal status as directors of the society. Even Hirsh, who had been appointed by the board on March 29, 1917, following the resignation of Henry C. Rockwell, was said to have no legal standing because his appointment had taken place in New York rather than Allegheny, as required by law. Rutherford claimed to have known these facts since 1909 and to have conveyed them to Russell on more than one occasion.

On July 12, Rutherford traveled to Pittsburgh and exercised his right under the society's charter to fill what he claimed were four vacancies on the board, appointing A. H. Macmillan and Pennsylvania Bible Students W. E. Spill, John A. Bohnet and George H. Fisher as directors. Rutherford called a meeting of the new board on July 17, where the directors passed a resolution expressing "hearty approval" of the actions of their president and affirming him as "the man the Lord has chosen to carry on the work that yet remains to be done." On July 31 he called a meeting of the People's Pulpit Association, a Watch Tower Society subsidiary incorporated in New York, to expel Hirsh and Hoskins as directors on the grounds that they were opposing the work of the Association. When the resolution failed to gain a majority, Rutherford exercised shareholder proxies provided for the annual meeting in New York the previous January to secure their expulsion. On August 1 the Watch Tower Society published a 24-page journal, Harvest Siftings, subtitled "The evil one again attempts to disrupt the Society", in which Rutherford stated his version of the events and explained why he had appointed the new board members.

A month later the four ousted directors responded with a self-funded rebuttal of Rutherford's statement. The publication, Light After Darkness, contained a letter by Pierson, dated July 26, in which the vice-president declared he was now siding with the old board. Although he believed both sides of the conflict had displayed "a measure of wrongs", Pierson had decided Rutherford had been wrong to appoint new directors. The ousted directors' publication disputed the legality of their expulsion, stating that the clause in the Pennsylvania law prohibiting life memberships on boards had been only recently introduced and was not retroactive, exempting existing corporations from the statute. They also claimed that the Watch Tower Society's charter allowed only directors to be elected as officers and that therefore the election of Rutherford, Van Amburgh, and Pierson as officers was void because none had been directors in January. Their advice from several lawyers, they said, was that Rutherford's course was "wholly unlawful".

The ex-directors' publication claimed Rutherford had required all Bethel workers to sign a petition supporting him and condemning the former directors, with the threat of dismissal for any who refused to sign. Some workers complained that they had signed under duress; it was claimed that as many as 35 members of the Bethel family were forced to leave for failing to support Rutherford during his "reign of terror". Rutherford denied anyone had been forced out for refusing to sign the letter. Despite attempts by Pierson to reconcile the two groups, the former directors left the Brooklyn headquarters on August 8.

== Rutherford's re-election and aftermath ==
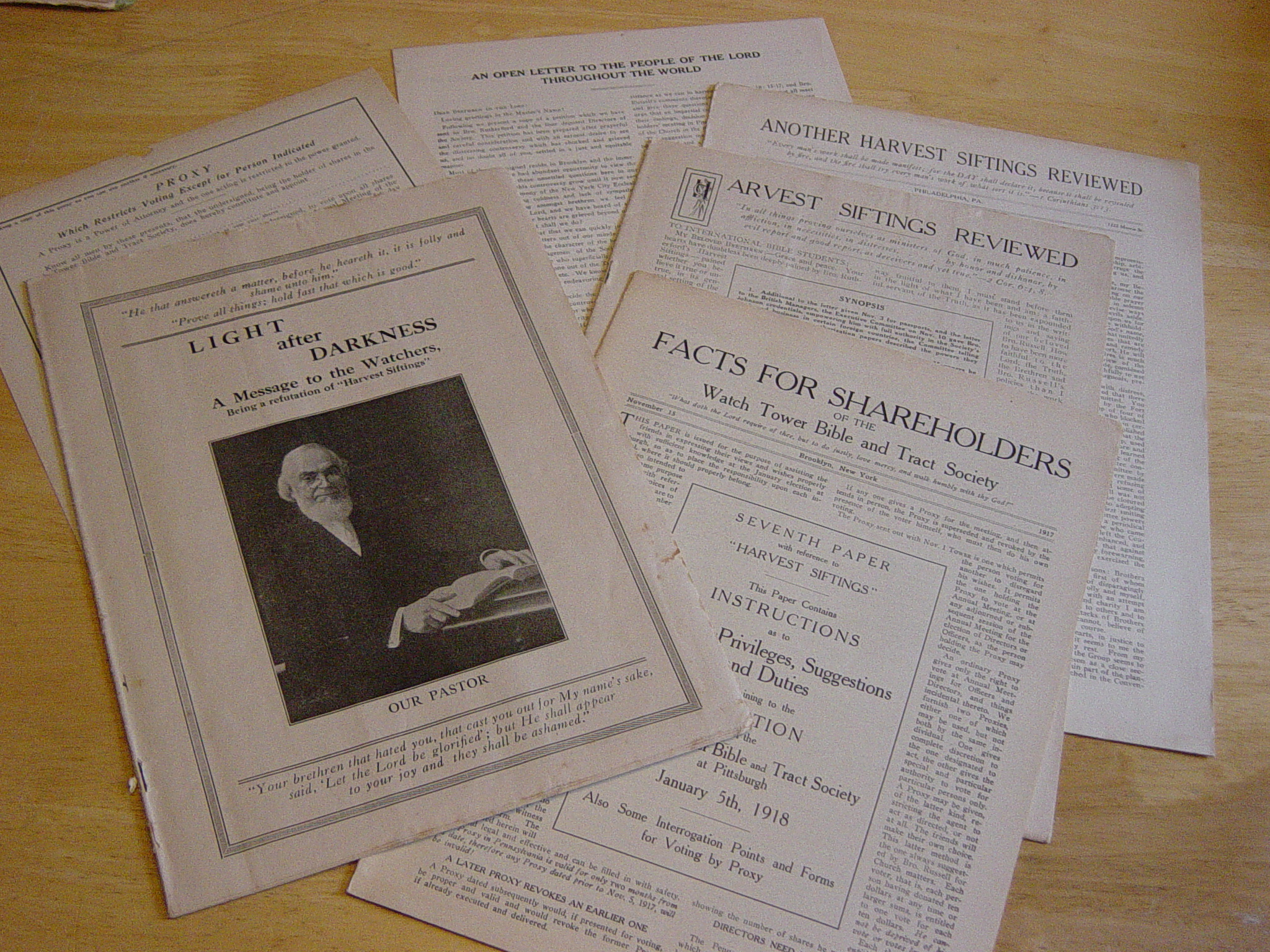
Pamphlets published by opposing sides during the dispute over Rutherford's leadership, 1917.

Publications continued through late 1917, with Rutherford on one side and Johnson and the four expelled directors on the other, each accusing their opponents of gross misrepresentation and trying to usurp authority. The controversy fractured the harmony of the Bible Student movement and many congregations split into opposing groups loyal to either Rutherford or those he had expelled.

The four expelled board members made a final attempt to unseat Rutherford, claiming that although he had the backing of the most powerful shareholders, he lacked the support of the Bible Student movement in general. They therefore called for a democratic vote from all the Bible Students. Rutherford wrote in October, "I did not seek election to the office of President, and I am not seeking re-election. The Lord is able to attend to his own business."

In December 1918 he organized a referendum of all Bible Students and Watch Tower subscribers, a month before the annual Pittsburgh convention. Although not binding, votes were counted in more than 800 U.S. congregations, giving Rutherford 95 percent of the vote for president. His opposers ranked 10th, 11th, 12th, and 13th on the list of prospective directors, with the highest support given to Rutherford's existing six co-directors. On January 5, 1918, Rutherford was returned to office, receiving 194,106 shareholders' votes. Hirsh received 23,198 votes—the highest among the ex-directors—putting him in 10th place. A resolution was promptly passed to request that Hirsh resign from the editorial committee.

Rutherford stated at the convention that he was aware he had made many mistakes. By mid-1919, about one in seven Bible Students had left rather than accept his leadership. Enough had left by 1928 that several various Bible Student groups had formed as the Stand Fast Movement, the Layman's Home Missionary Movement, the Dawn Bible Students Association, the Pastoral Bible Institute, and the Elijah Voice Movement. But Rutherford continued to be voted into the presidency until his death in 1942. The splinter groups that were independent of the Watch Tower Society remained relatively small. In 1931, the group under Rutherford's leadership became known as "Jehovah's witnesses".

A later Watchtower described the outcome of the 1917 leadership dispute as the removal of "a class of insubordinate ones who rebelled against the ways of the Lord" before Christ's inspection and approval of the "faithful and discreet slave class" in 1918.

== Bibliography ==
- Penton, James M. (1997). Apocalypse Delayed: The Story of Jehovah's Witnesses (2nd ed.). University of Toronto Press. ISBN 0-8020-7973-3.
- Rogerson, Alan (1969). Millions Now Living Will Never Die. Constable, London.
- Wills, Tony (2007). A People For His Name. Lulu Enterprises. ISBN 978-1-4303-0100-4.
- Watch Tower Bible & Tract Society (1975). 1975 Yearbook. Watch Tower Bible & Tract Society.
- Watch Tower Bible & Tract Society (1959). Jehovah's Witnesses in the Divine Purpose. Watch Tower Bible & Tract Society.
- Watch Tower Bible & Tract Society (1993). Jehovah's Witnesses – Proclaimers of God's Kingdom. Watch Tower Bible & Tract Society.
- Macmillan, A. H. (1957). Faith on the March. Prentice-Hall.
- Rutherford, J.F. (August 1, 1917a), Harvest Siftings (PDF), Watch Tower Bible & Tract Society, archived from the original (PDF) on July 15, 2011
- Rutherford, J.F. (October 1, 1917b), Harvest Siftings, Part II (PDF), Watch Tower Bible & Tract Society, archived from the original (PDF) on July 15, 2011
- Pierson, A.N.; et al. (September 1, 1917), Light After Darkness (PDF), archived from the original (PDF) on July 15, 2011
- Johnson, Paul S.L. (November 1, 1917), Harvest Siftings Reviewed (PDF), archived from the original (PDF) on July 15, 2011
- Penton, M. J. (1997). Apocalypse Delayed (2nd ed.). University of Toronto Press. ISBN 0-8020-7973-3.
