= Alexander Hugh Macmillan =

Canadian Jehovah Witness leader

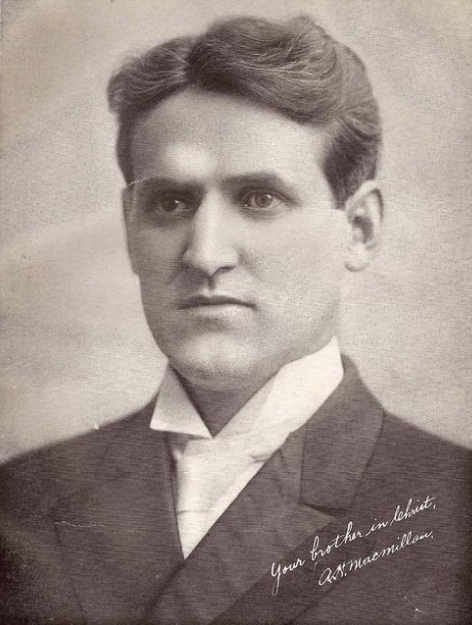
- Alexander Hugh Macmillan
- Born: June 2, 1877; Canada
- Died: August 26, 1966 (aged 89)
- Burial place: Staten Island, New York
- Known for: Involvement in the Bible Student movement and Jehovah’s Witnesses
- Notable work: Faith on the March (1957)

Alexander Hugh Macmillan (June 2, 1877 – August 26, 1966), also referred to as A. H. Macmillan, was an important member of the Bible Students, and later, of Jehovah’s Witnesses. He became a board member of the Watch Tower Bible and Tract Society in 1917 and again in 1920. He presented a history of the religious movement in his book Faith on the March, published in 1957.

== Early life ==
Macmillan was born in Canada. From an early age he had a deep interest in serving God. At age 16, he decided to be a preacher, attending a school away from home, but ceased his studies when he suffered a nervous breakdown. With financial aid from his father, he relocated to Boston, Massachusetts. There, he came in contact with the Bible Student movement. In about 1897, he obtained a copy of the book, The Plan of the Ages, the first of the six-volume series Millennial Dawn (later called Studies in the Scriptures), written by Charles Taze Russell. He later obtained the second volume in the series, The Time Is At Hand, which claimed that the end of the Gentile Times would occur in 1914. He believed he had finally found biblical truth and later used the books as a basis for his theory that he and others would be 'taken home' to heaven in 1914.

== Ministry ==
Macmillan first met Russell in 1900. In June of that year, he traveled to Philadelphia to a convention sponsored by the Watch Tower Society. In September, he was baptized in Boston. The following year he became a missionary and full-time minister in Massachusetts.

In September 1901 he traveled to Cleveland to attend a convention, after which he was invited by Russell to live at the Watch Tower Society's headquarters in Allegheny. Macmillan traveled extensively with Russell, and in 1905 during a convention tour, he met J. F. Rutherford.

== Macmillan's proclamation of 1914 ==
In the decades prior to 1914, Watch Tower Society publications claimed that Armageddon would take place in 1914. As the year approached, their publications stated that October 1914 would mark the "end of the Gentile Times" and the beginning of Christ's kingship. Many Bible Students believed they would be sent to heaven in 1914. At a convention at Saratoga Springs, New York, on September 27–30, Macmillan, believing that "the church was "going home" in October", he announced that "This is probably the last public address I shall ever deliver because we shall be going home soon."

Following the convention, at a meeting at the Brooklyn headquarters, Russell announced: "The Gentile Times have ended; their kings have had their day," and added that, "At 10:30 Sunday morning Brother Macmillan will give us an address." Those present laughed about Macmillan's previous announcement of his "last public address"; in the subsequent talk, Macmillan acknowledged, "some of us had been a bit too hasty in thinking that we were going to heaven right away". Despite his expectations for October 1914, Macmillan remained committed to the Watch Tower Society.

In 1919, The New York Times characterized Macmillan's address to a meeting of Bible Students as proposing a "new date for the Millennium" in the year 1925.

== Watch Tower Society board of directors ==
In Faith on the March, Macmillan described a private meeting he had with Russell in 1916. According to Macmillan, Russell spoke of his poor health and indicated a desire for Macmillan to take over the affairs of the Allegheny office. Russell died several weeks later, on October 31, 1916. By 1918, The New York Times described Macmillan as "Superintendent of the Bethel Home" and as one of "the leaders of the International Bible Students Association".

At the January 5, 1918, annual meeting of the Watch Tower Society, Macmillan was formally elected to the Society's board of directors, and Rutherford was reelected as a board member and president. That year, Macmillan—along with Rutherford and other Watch Tower Society officials—was arrested, charged with violation of the Sedition Act of 1918 as a result of anti-war sentiments expressed in the book, The Finished Mystery; they were sentenced to federal prison in Atlanta, but were released and exonerated in 1919.

During the 1920s, Macmillan traveled extensively on service tours to Europe and the Middle East, for public speaking engagements and to monitor activities at branch offices around the world. Such assignments included Scotland, Denmark, Finland, Norway, Palestine, Lebanon and Syria, Italy, and Sweden.

Macmillan also traveled throughout the United States and Canada as an appointed "pilgrim", performing twice-yearly visits with local congregations. By the 1930s, Macmillan, based in Brooklyn, was a "traveling representative" speaking at congregations and larger assemblies, encouraging individuals to pursue the full-time ministry. Macmillan also met with local law enforcement and government officials to explain the significance of the dozens of then-recent U.S. Supreme Court decisions which were mostly favorable to Jehovah's Witnesses. Macmillan was permitted by the director of the United States Bureau of Prisons to regularly visit Witnesses in federal prisons in the United States who had been incarcerated for refusing military service during World War II.

== Later years ==
In 1955, Macmillan was granted permission to use Watch Tower Society records to compile a history of Jehovah's Witnesses. In 1957, he published his account, under the title, Faith on the March.

Macmillan became an on-air personality on the Watch Tower Society's radio station WBBR, answering questions and providing counsel until the station was sold in 1957.

Macmillan experienced pain associated with increasing health problems, and he privately likened himself to the biblical Job, leading up to his death on August 26, 1966. Macmillan's funeral service was conducted by Watch Tower Society president Nathan Knorr on August 29, and he was buried at a private burial plot on Staten Island, New York.
