= Beth Sarim =

Mansion in San Diego

Coordinates: 32°46′16.36″N 117°05′56.70″W

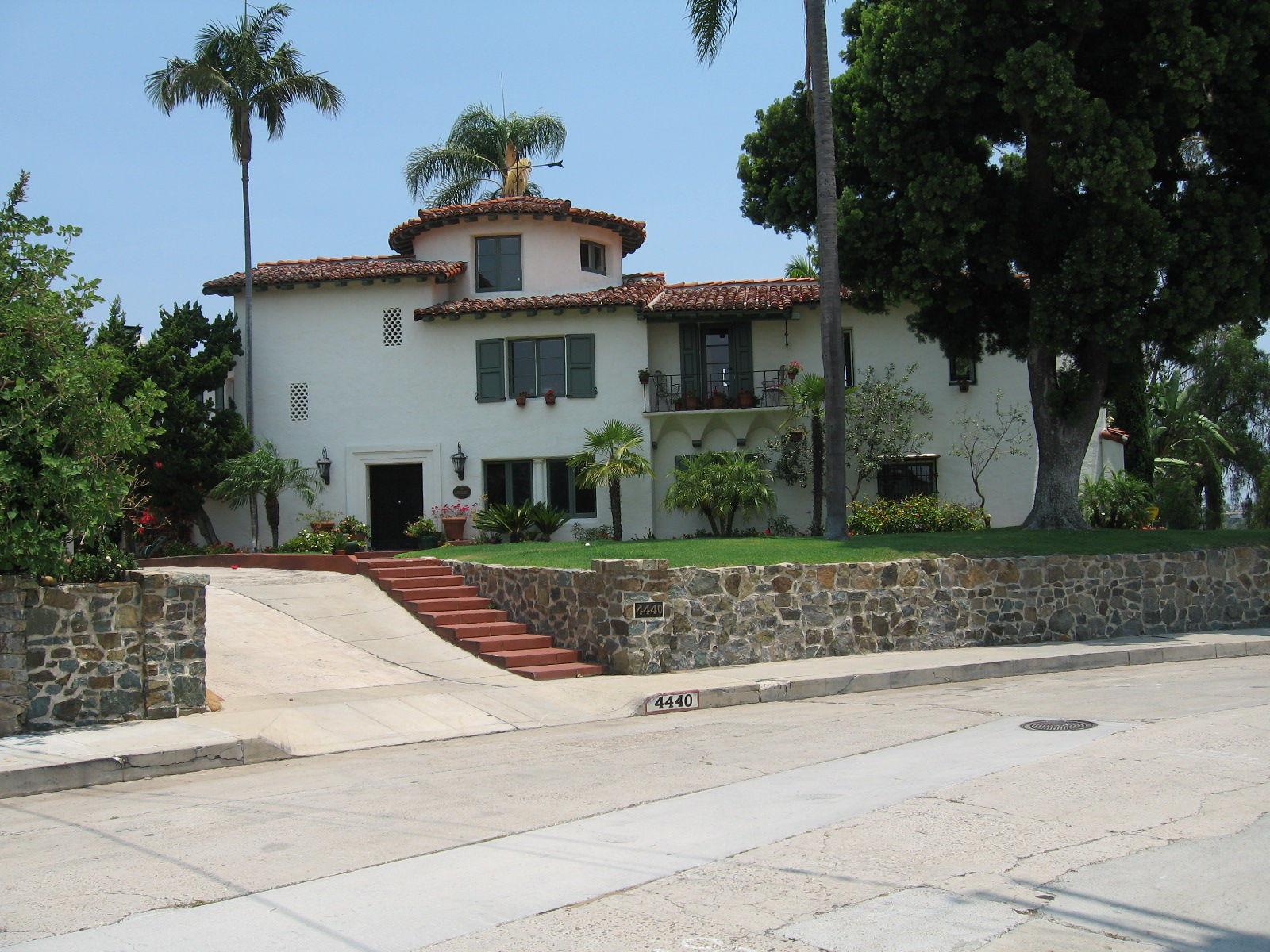
The house as it was in 2008

Beth Sarim (Hebrew בית שרים "House of the Princes") is a ten-bedroom mansion in San Diego, California, constructed in 1929 in anticipation of various resurrected Old Testament biblical patriarchs or prophets such as Abraham, Moses, David, Isaiah and Samuel. It was maintained by the Watch Tower Society, the parent organization used by Jehovah's Witnesses, and was also used as a winter home and executive office for Watch Tower president Joseph Franklin Rutherford. The house was sold to a private owner in 1948.

== Background ==
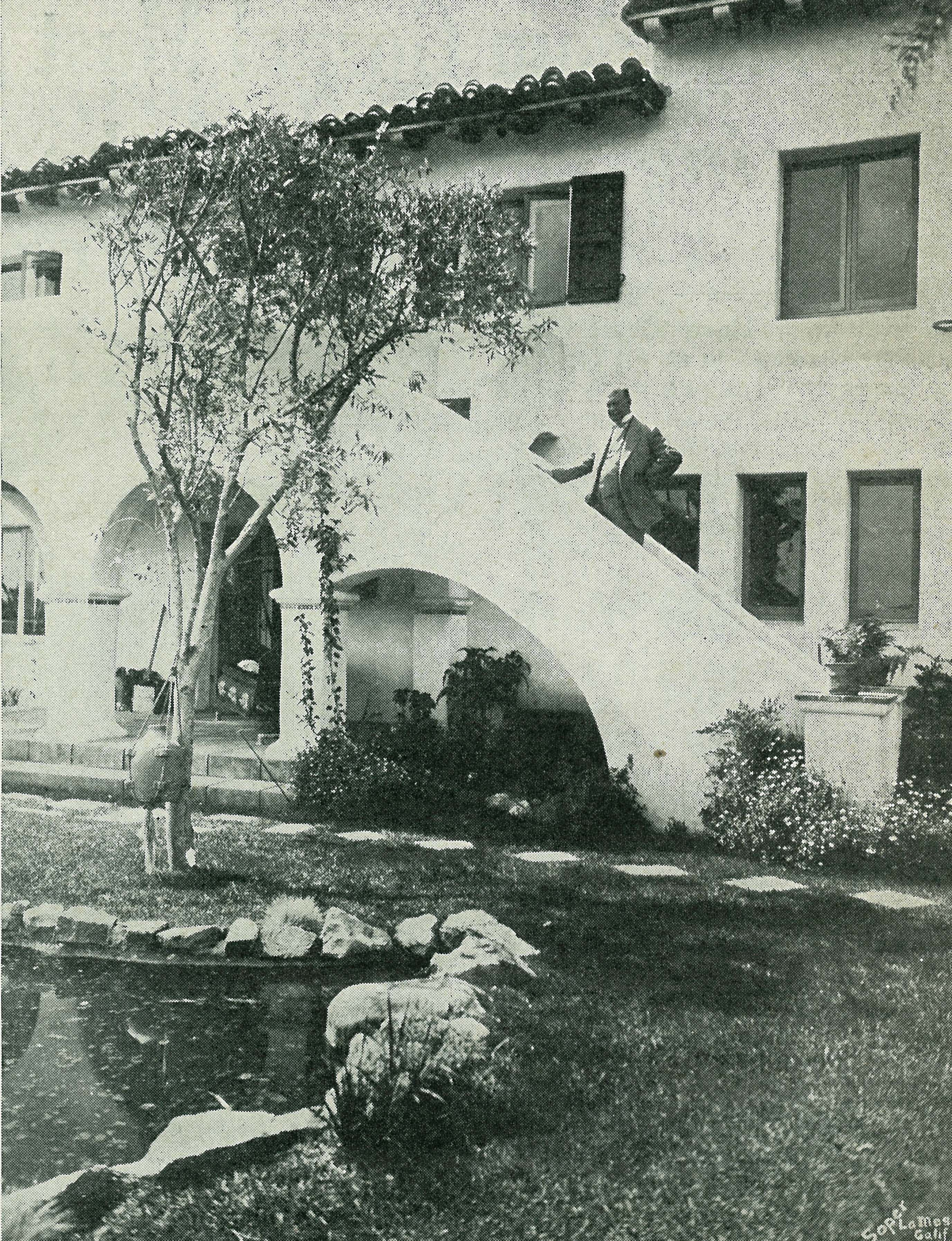
Rutherford standing on the outside stairs at Beth Sarim shortly after its construction

In 1918, Watch Tower publications began predicting, under the direction of Rutherford, that Old Testament patriarchs or "princes" would be resurrected back to earthly life in 1925. It was taught that these "princes" would become earth's new leaders and that their resurrection would be a prelude to the inauguration of a new earthly society and the abolition of death. (It had previously been taught that these individuals were to be raised shortly after 1914.) These "princes" would use Jerusalem as their capital, with some of the "princes" being located in other "principal parts of the earth". Despite the failure of this prediction, Rutherford continued to preach their imminent return.

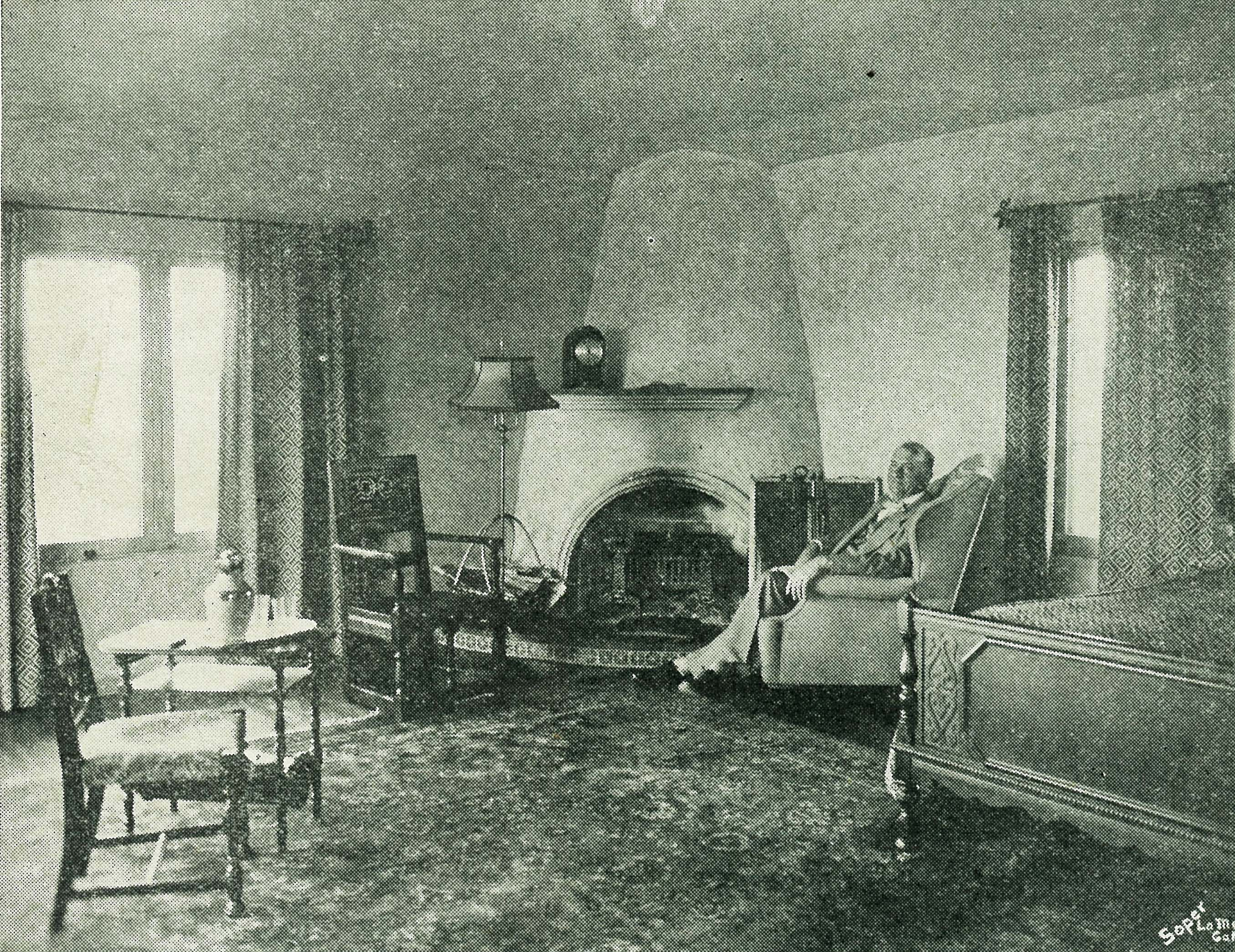
J. F. Rutherford at Beth Sarim

During this time, Rutherford spent winters in San Diego, California, for health reasons, and "in time, a direct contribution was made for the purpose of constructing a house in San Diego for brother Rutherford's use". The property was acquired in October 1929 by Robert J Martin and was given to Rutherford in December for the nominal fee of $10 (current equivalent $188). The house was built in that year.

Rutherford named the property Beth Sarim and dedicated it for the use of the expected Old Testament "princes", who were now expected to be headquartered in San Diego instead of Jerusalem. The deed for Beth Sarim, written by Rutherford, said that the property was to be held "perpetually in trust" for the Old Testament "princes" and was to be surrendered to them once they arrived.

It was located in the Kensington Heights section of San Diego over an area of about 100 acres (0.40 km^{2}), landscaped with olive, date, and palm trees so that the "princes" would "feel at home". The 5,100 square feet (470 m^{2}) residence, designed by San Diego architect Richard S. Requa, is a ten-bedroom Spanish mansion with an adjacent two-car garage. The building costs at the time were about $25,000 (current equivalent $469,000). Writing in the book Salvation in 1939, Rutherford explained that Beth Sarim would forever be used by the resurrected "princes".

== Occupation ==
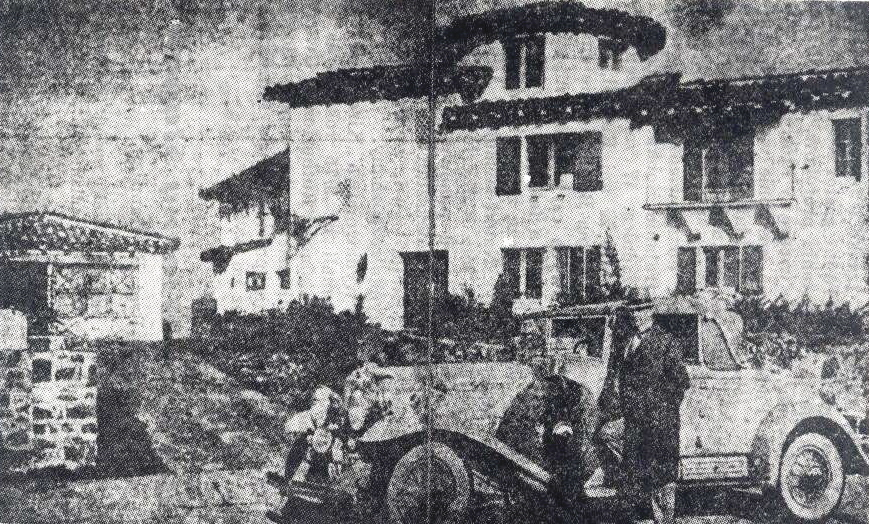
Rutherford with his Cadillac coupe in front of Beth Sarim

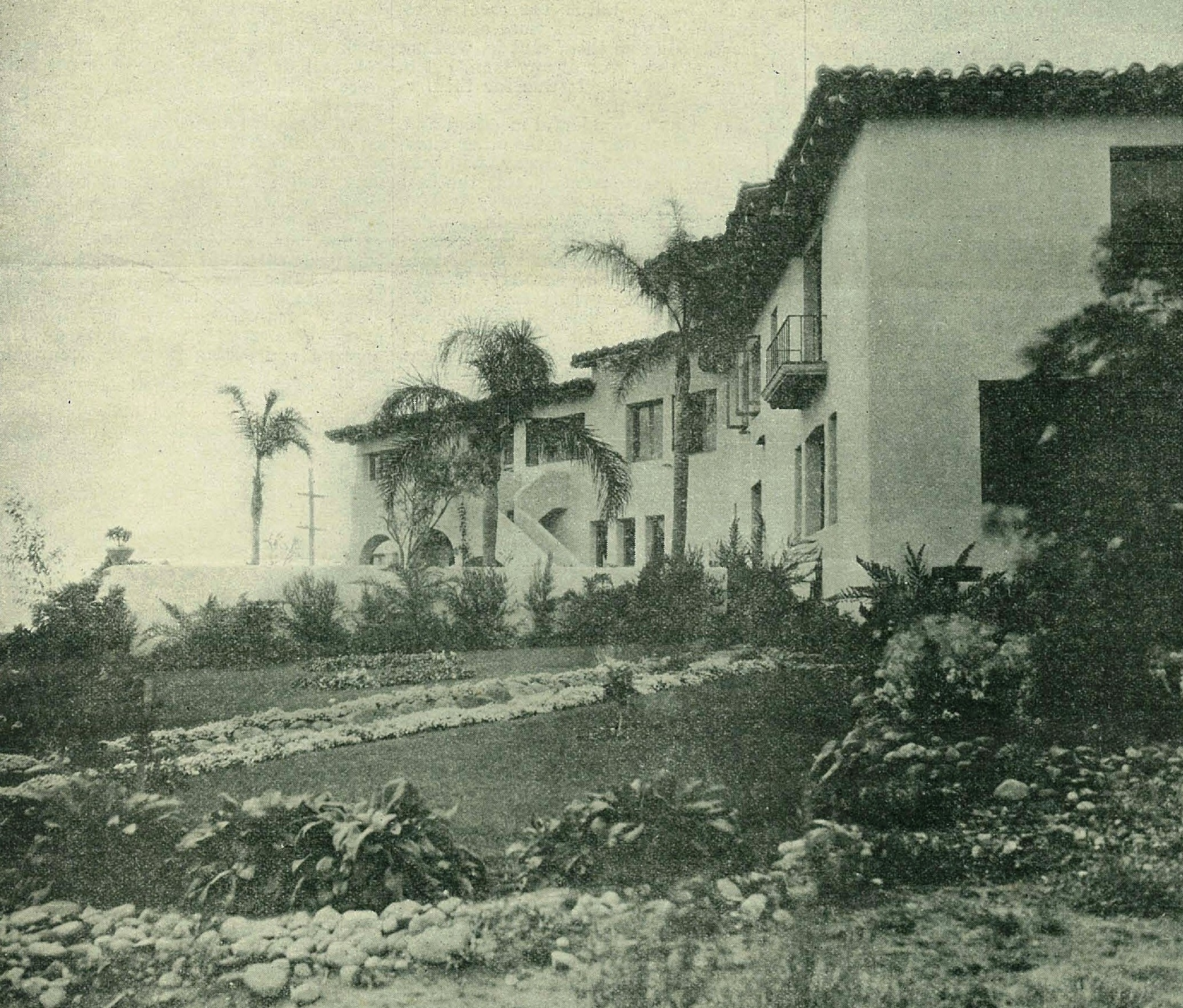
Beth Sarim as pictured in the Watchtower publication The Messenger in 1931

Rutherford moved into Beth Sarim in early 1930 and served as caretaker of the property awaiting the resurrection of the "princes". Newspapers of the time reported on Rutherford's lavish lifestyle, which included a 16-cylinder Fisher Fleetwood Cadillac coupe. The residence was cited by Olin R. Moyle, former legal counsel for Jehovah's Witnesses, in a letter to Rutherford in 1939, as one of the examples of "the difference between the accommodations furnished to you, and your personal attendants, compared with those furnished to some of your brethren".

Walter F. Salter, former manager of the Canadian branch of the Watch Tower Society, also criticized Rutherford's use of Beth Sarim. A reply to Salter's criticisms of Rutherford was published in the May 2, 1937, Golden Age, with a photocopy of a letter from W. E. Van Amburgh, Secretary-Treasurer of the Watch Tower Society, stating:

Not one cent of the funds of the Watch Tower Bible and Tract Society went into the construction of the home in San Diego where Judge Rutherford does his winter work. It was the gift of friends. I did not know of the existence of the house until I read of it in The Golden Age. Not one cent of the funds of the Watch Tower Bible and Tract Society went into either of the Cadillac cars used by Rutherford at San Diego and Brooklyn. They were the gift of friends.

The magazine Consolation (successor to The Golden Age) explained that Beth Sarim served as Rutherford's winter headquarters:

For twelve winters Judge Rutherford and his office force occupied Beth Sarim. It was not used as a place of ease or vacationing, but was used as a winter workshop; the books from Vindication, Book One down to and including Children were written there, as well as many Watchtower articles and booklets. The executive instructions for branches all over the earth also were transmitted from Beth-Sarim during the Judge's presence there. At Beth Sarim, Judge Rutherford completed the 1942 Yearbook material as his last work before his death. He dictated this material from his dying bed.

== Rutherford's burial ==
Rutherford died at Beth Sarim on January 8, 1942, at the age of 72. After his death, Rutherford's burial was delayed for three and a half months due to legal proceedings arising from his desire to be buried at Beth Sarim, which he had previously expressed to three close advisers from Brooklyn headquarters. Witnesses collected over 14,000 signatures on a petition that Rutherford's dying wish might be granted. The May 27, 1942, Consolation explained:

As early as 1920 Judge Rutherford pointed out that the ancient witnesses or princes were promised an earthly resurrection by the Lord. In that year he delivered a public address at Los Angeles, California, entitled 'Millions Now Living Will Never Die,' in which he called attention to the expectations of the return of the men above mentioned. All the publications since emphasize the same fact. It therefore appears that the return of the princes is a fundamental teaching of the Scriptures. It is as certain as the truth of God's Word. Judge Rutherford gave much of his life in endeavoring to bring this vital matter to the people's attention. What, then, could be more fitting and appropriate before God and before men that his bones should rest on the land held in trust for the men whose coming he was privileged to announce.

Consolation condemned San Diego County officials for their refusal to grant a permit for Rutherford's burial at Beth Sarim or on a neighboring property named Beth Shan, also owned by the Watchtower Society:

It was not the fate of the bones which they decided, but their own destiny. Nor is their blood on anyone else's head, because they were told three times that to fight against God, or to tamper with His servant's bones even, would bring upon them the condemnation of the Lord. ... So their responsibility is fixed, and they followed the course of Satan.

After all appeals were exhausted, Consolation stated that Rutherford's remains were shipped to New York where he was buried on April 25, 1942. Critics have speculated that Rutherford was secretly buried at Beth Sarim. The May 4, 1942, issue of Time noted Rutherford's burial at Rossville, New York, on Staten Island; a private burial plot for Watch Tower branch volunteers is on Woodrow Road. The exact grave location is unmarked; in 2002, a caretaker at Woodrow United Methodist Church and Cemetery (an adjoining graveyard) answered an inquiry about Watch Tower's plot by noting "I couldn't tell you who is buried on it because it has absolutely no markers or headstones or anything."

== Sale of property ==
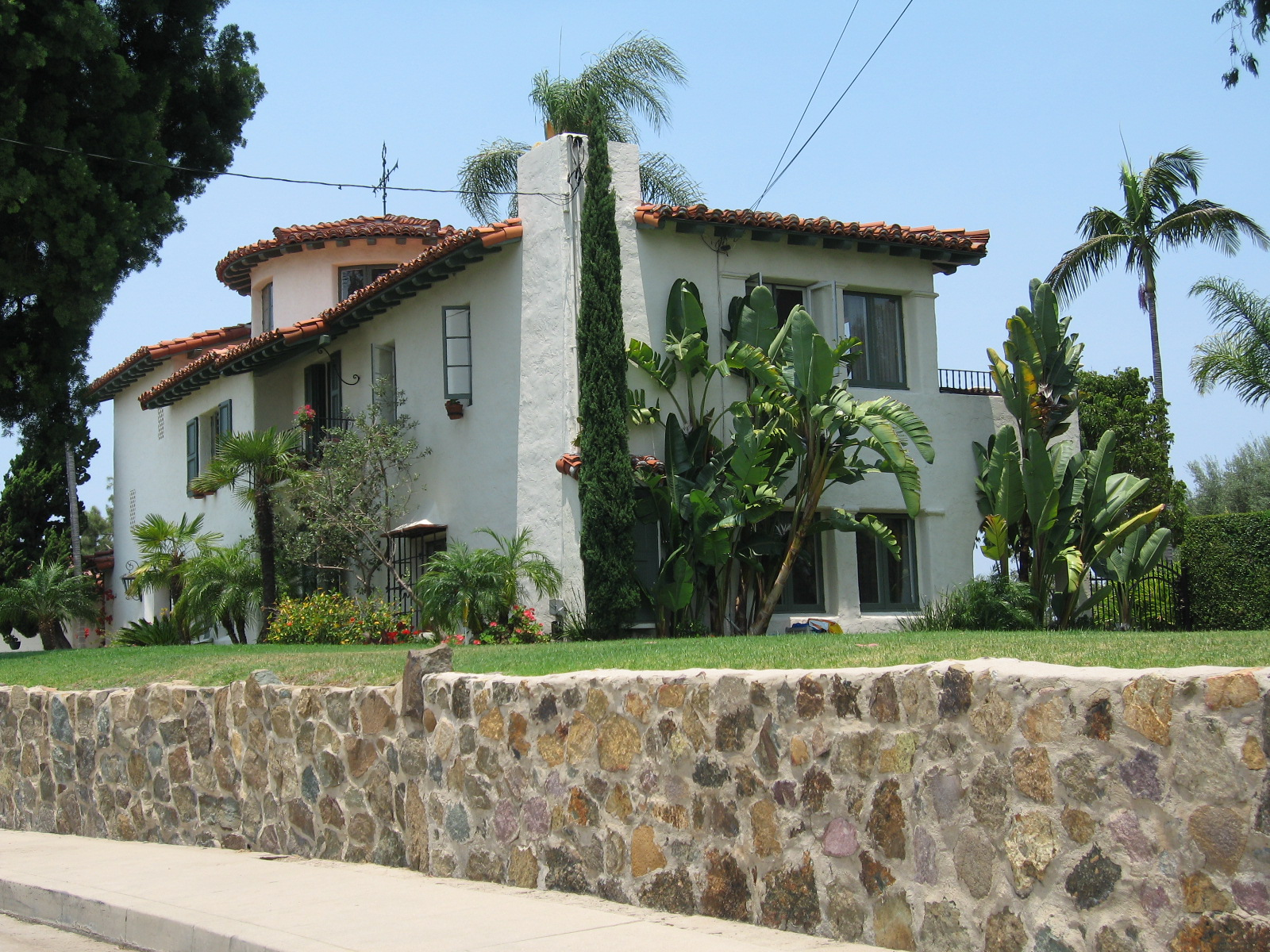
Beth Sarim in 2008

After Rutherford's death, the Watchtower Society maintained Beth Sarim for a few years, before selling the property in 1948. The belief that the "princes" would be resurrected before Armageddon was abandoned in 1950. In 1954, when asked at a trial in Scotland why the property was sold, Frederick William Franz—then vice president of the Watch Tower Society—explained:

Because it was there, and the prophets had not yet come back to occupy it, to make use of it, and the Society had no use for it at the time, it was in charge of a caretaker, and it was causing expense, and our understanding of the Scriptures opened up more, and more concerning the Princes, which will include those prophets, and so the property was sold as serving no present purpose.

The house is now privately owned and has been designated Historical Landmark number 474 by the City of San Diego.

== See also ==
- Eschatology of Jehovah's Witnesses
- History of Jehovah's Witnesses
