= Joseph Franklin Rutherford =

Second president of the incorporated Watch Tower Bible and Tract Society (1869–1942)

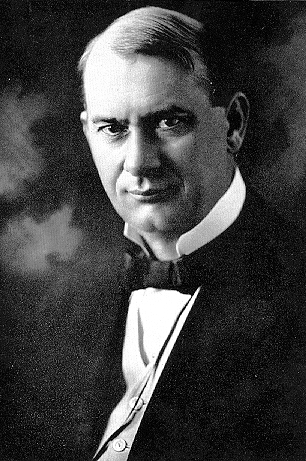
- Joseph Franklin Rutherford
- Born: November 8, 1869; Versailles, Missouri, US
- Died: January 8, 1942 (aged 72); San Diego, California, US
- Occupations: Lawyer; President of the Watch Tower Bible and Tract Society
- Movement: Jehovah's Witnesses
- Spouse: Mary Malcolm Fetzer (m. 1891)
- Children: 1

Joseph Franklin Rutherford (November 8, 1869 – January 8, 1942), also known as Judge Rutherford, was an American religious leader and the second president of the incorporated Watch Tower Bible and Tract Society. He played a primary role in the organization and doctrinal development of Jehovah's Witnesses, which emerged from the Bible Student movement established by Charles Taze Russell.

Rutherford began a career in law, working as a court stenographer, trial lawyer and prosecutor. He became a special judge in the 8th/14th Judicial District of Missouri at some time after 1895. He developed an interest in the doctrines of Watch Tower Society president Charles Taze Russell, which led to his joining the Bible Student movement, and he was baptized in 1906. He was appointed the legal counsel for the Watch Tower Society in 1907, as well as a traveling representative prior to his election as president in 1917. His early presidency was marked by a dispute with the Society's board of directors, in which four of its seven members accused him of autocratic behavior and sought to reduce his powers. The resulting leadership crisis divided the Bible Student community and contributed to the loss of one-seventh of adherents by 1919 and thousands more by 1931. Rutherford and seven other Watch Tower executives were imprisoned in 1918 after charges were laid over the publication of The Finished Mystery, a book deemed seditious for its opposition to World War I.

Rutherford introduced many organizational and doctrinal changes that helped shape the current beliefs and practices of Jehovah's Witnesses. He imposed a centralized administrative structure on the worldwide Bible Student movement, which he later called a theocracy, requiring all adherents to distribute literature via door to door preaching and to provide regular reports of their preaching activity. He also instituted training programs for public speaking as part of their weekly meetings for worship. He established 1914 as the date of Jesus' invisible return, asserted that Christ did not die on a cross, formulated the current Witness concept of Armageddon as God's war on the wicked, and reinforced the belief that the start of Christ's millennial reign was imminent. He condemned the observance of traditional celebrations such as Christmas and birthdays, the saluting of national flags and the singing of national anthems. He introduced the name "Jehovah's witnesses" in 1931 and the term "Kingdom Hall" for houses of worship in 1935. He introduced the teaching of neutrality with regard to politics and war.

He wrote twenty-one Watch Tower Society books and was credited by the Society in 1942 with the distribution of almost 400 million books and booklets. Despite significant decreases during the 1920s, overall membership increased more than sixfold by the end of Rutherford's 25 years as president.

== Early life ==
Rutherford was born on November 8, 1869, to James Calvin Rutherford and Leonora Strickland and raised in near-poverty in a Baptist farm family. Some sources list his place of birth as Boonville, Missouri, but according to his death certificate he was born in Versailles, Missouri. Rutherford developed an interest in law from the age of 16. Although his father discouraged this interest, he allowed Rutherford to go to college under the condition that he pay for a laborer to take his place on the family farm. Rutherford took out a loan and helped to pay for his law studies by working as a door-to-door encyclopedia salesman and court stenographer.

=== Law career ===
Rutherford spent two years as a judge's intern, became an official court reporter at age 20, and was admitted to The Missouri Bar in May 1892 at age 22. He became a trial lawyer for a law firm and later served for four years in Boonville as a public prosecutor. He campaigned briefly for Democratic presidential candidate William Jennings Bryan. He was appointed as a Special Judge in the 8th/14th Judicial Circuit Court of Missouri, sitting as a substitute judge at least once when a regular judge was unable to hold court. As a result of this appointment he became known by the sobriquet Judge Rutherford. He was admitted to the New York bar in 1909 and admitted to practice before the Supreme Court of the United States the same year.

== Watch Tower Society ==
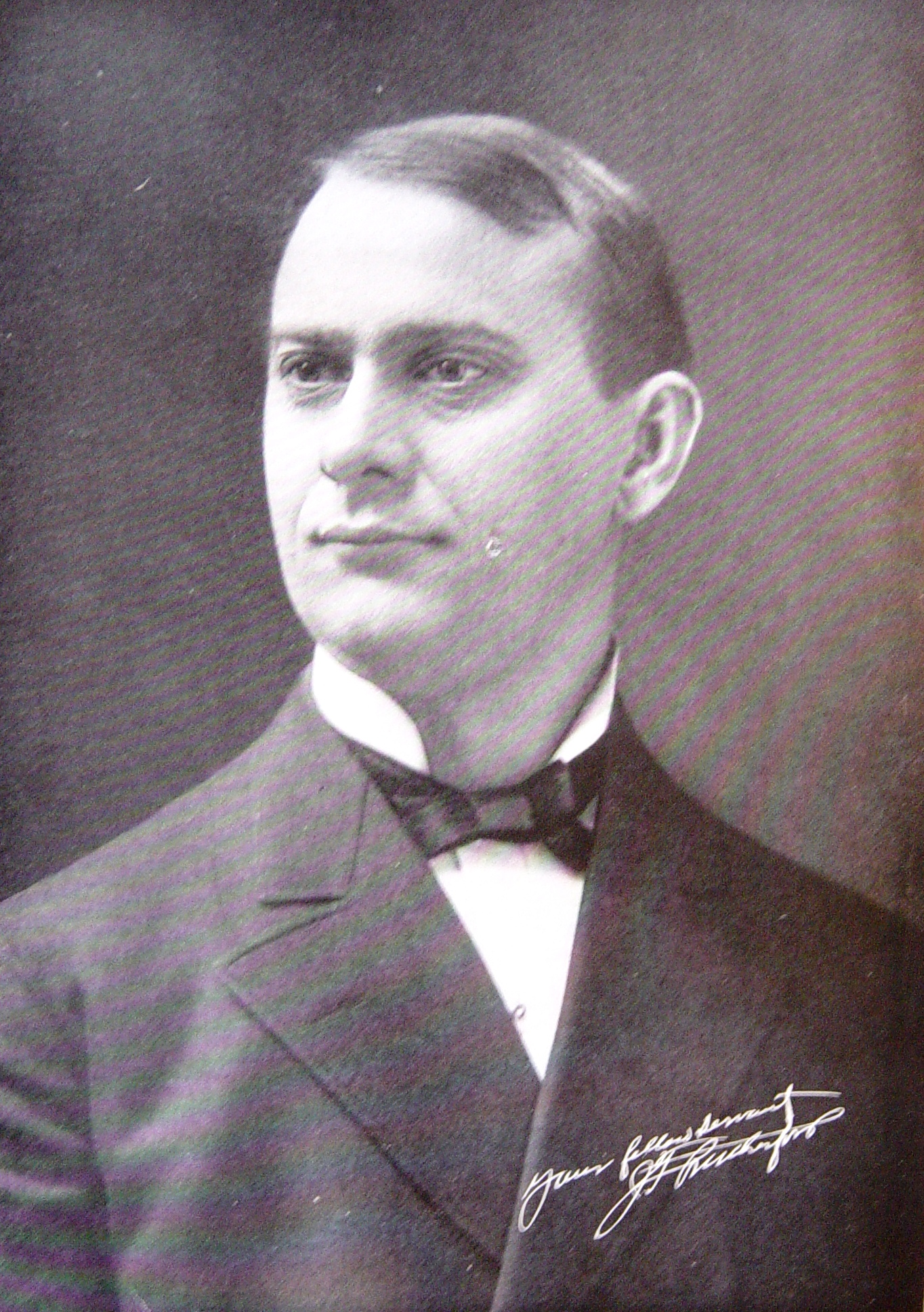
Joseph F. Rutherford (1911)

In 1894, Rutherford purchased the first three volumes of Charles Taze Russell's Millennial Dawn series of Bible study textbooks from two colporteurs who visited his office. Rutherford, who then viewed all religions as insincere, shallow and hypocritical, was struck by Russell's sincerity and his sentiments towards religion, which mirrored his own view. Rutherford immediately wrote to the Watch Tower Society to express appreciation for the books. He was baptized twelve years later and he and his wife began holding Bible classes in their home. In 1907, he became legal counsel for the Watch Tower Society at its Pittsburgh headquarters, and from around that time began to give public talks as a "pilgrim" representative of the Society.

As Russell's health deteriorated, Rutherford represented him on trips to Europe. In April 1915 he was deputized to speak at a major debate with Baptist preacher J. H. Troy over four nights in Los Angeles before an audience of 12,000, debating various subjects, including the state of the dead, hellfire and Christ's Second Coming. Rutherford wrote a pamphlet, A Great Battle in the Ecclesiastical Heavens, in defense of Russell and served as chairman of the Bible Students' Los Angeles convention in September 1916.

=== Board of directors ===
By 1916, Rutherford had become one of the seven directors of the Watch Tower Society; when Russell died on October 31, 1916, he joined vice-President Alfred I. Ritchie and Secretary-Treasurer William E. Van Amburgh on a three-man executive committee that ran the Pennsylvania corporation until a new president was elected at the annual general meeting the following January. He also joined a five-person editorial committee to run The Watch Tower from the December 15, 1916, issue. Russell's will, drawn up in 1907, had named the five people he wished to run the magazine after his death; Rutherford appeared only on a second list of five alternative members to fill any vacancies that arose.

Bible Student Alexander H. Macmillan, who served as an aide to the executive committee, later wrote that tensions at the Watch Tower Society headquarters mounted as the day for election of the Society's officers approached. He wrote: "A few ambitious ones at headquarters were holding caucuses here and there, doing a little electioneering to get their men in. However, Van Amburgh and I held a large number of votes. Many shareholders, knowing of our long association with Russell, sent their proxies to us to be cast for the one whom we thought best fitted for office."

Macmillan, who claimed he had declined an offer from an ailing Russell months earlier to accept the position of president after his death, agreed with Van Amburgh that Rutherford was the best candidate. According to Macmillan, "Rutherford did not know what was going on. He certainly didn't do any electioneering or canvassing for votes, but I guess he was doing some worrying, knowing if he was elected he would have a big job on his hands ... There is no doubt in our minds that the Lord's will was done in this choice. It is certain that Rutherford himself had nothing to do with it."

=== Presidency dispute ===
On January 6, 1917, Rutherford, aged 47, was elected president of the Watch Tower Society, unopposed, at the Pittsburgh convention. By-laws passed by both the Pittsburgh convention and the board of directors stated that the president would be the executive officer and general manager of the Society, giving him full charge of its affairs worldwide.

By June, four of the seven Watch Tower Society directors—Robert H. Hirsh, Alfred I. Ritchie, Isaac F. Hoskins and James D. Wright— had decided they had erred in endorsing Rutherford's expanded powers of management, claiming Rutherford had become autocratic. In June, Hirsch attempted to rescind the new by-laws and reclaim the board's authority from the president. Rutherford later claimed he had by then detected a conspiracy among the directors to seize control of the society. In July, Rutherford gained a legal opinion from a Philadelphia corporation lawyer that none of his opposers were legally directors of the society. The Watch Tower Society's official 1959 account of its history claimed the legal advice given to the ousted directors confirmed that given to Rutherford. The pamphlets produced by the expelled board members at the time indicated that their legal advice, acquired from several attorneys, disagreed with Rutherford's.

On July 12, Rutherford filled what he claimed were four vacancies on the board, appointing Macmillan and Pennsylvania Bible Students W. E. Spill, J. A. Bohnet and George H. Fisher as directors. Between August and November the society and the four ousted directors published a series of pamphlets, with each side accusing the other of ambitious and reckless behavior. The former directors also claimed Rutherford had required all headquarters workers to sign a petition supporting him and threatened dismissal for any who refused to sign. The former directors left the Brooklyn headquarters on August 8. On January 5, 1918, shareholders returned Rutherford to office.

The controversy fractured the Bible Student movement and some congregations split into opposing groups loyal either to Rutherford or those he had expelled. By mid-1919 about one in seven Bible Students had chosen to leave rather than accept Rutherford's leadership, and over the following decade they helped form or joined other groups including the Stand Fast Movement, the Layman's Home Missionary Movement, the Dawn Bible Students Association, the Pastoral Bible Institute, the Elijah Voice Movement, the Concordant Publishing Concern, and the Eagle Society.

== The Finished Mystery ==
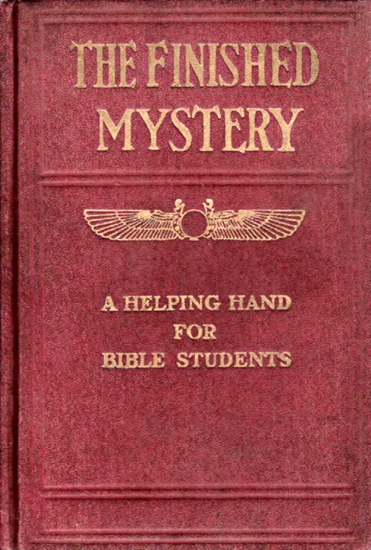
"The Finished Mystery", volume 7 of "Studies in the Scriptures"

In late 1916, Fisher and another prominent Bible Student at the Brooklyn headquarters, Clayton J. Woodworth, sought the Executive Committee's approval to produce a book about the prophecies of the books of Revelation and Ezekiel based primarily on Russell's writings. Work on the book, The Finished Mystery, proceeded without the knowledge of the full Board of Directors and Editorial Committee and was released by Rutherford to headquarters staff on July 17, 1917, the day he announced the appointment of the four replacement directors.

The book, which was misleadingly labeled as the posthumous seventh volume of Russell's Studies in the Scriptures, was denounced by Rutherford's opponents, but became a best-seller and was translated into six languages and serialized in The Watch Tower. Expecting God's Kingdom to establish rule on earth and for the saints to be raised to heaven in 1918, Rutherford wrote in January of that year: "The Christian looks for the year to bring the full consummation of the church's hopes." He embarked on a vast advertising campaign to expose the "unrighteousness" of religions and their alliances with "beastly" governments, expanding on claims in The Finished Mystery that patriotism was a delusion and murder.

The campaign attracted the attention of governments and on February 12, 1918, the book was banned by the Canadian government for what a Winnipeg newspaper described as "seditious and antiwar statements". On February 24 in Los Angeles Rutherford gave a talk entitled "The World Has Ended—Millions Now Living May Never Die" (subsequent talks in the series were renamed, "Millions Now Living Will Never Die") in which he attacked the clergy, declaring: "As a class, according to the Scriptures, the clergymen are the most reprehensible men on earth for the great war that is now afflicting mankind." Three days later the Army Intelligence Bureau seized the Society's Los Angeles offices and confiscated literature.

=== Imprisonment and release ===
In early May 1918, US Attorney General Thomas Watt Gregory condemned The Finished Mystery as "one of the most dangerous examples of ... propaganda ... a work written in extremely religious language and distributed in enormous numbers". Warrants were issued for the arrest of Rutherford and seven other Watch Tower directors, who were charged under the 1917 Espionage Act with attempting to cause insubordination, disloyalty, refusal of duty in the armed forces and obstructing the recruitment and enlistment service of the U.S. while it was at war.

On June 21, seven of them, including Rutherford, were sentenced to 20 years' imprisonment. Rutherford feared his opponents would gain control of the Society in his absence, but on January 2, 1919, he learned he had been re-elected president at the Pittsburgh convention the day before, convincing him that God wanted him in the position. On March 26, 1919, the directors were released on bail after an appeals court ruled they had been wrongly convicted; in May 1920 the government announced that all charges had been dropped.

== Reorganization ==
=== Administrative changes ===
Following his release from prison, Rutherford began a major reorganization of Bible Student activities. At a May 1919 convention in Ohio he announced the publication of a new magazine, The Golden Age (later renamed Awake!). Because Russell's will had decreed the Society should publish no other periodicals the new magazine was at first published by "Woodworth, Hudgings & Martin", with a Manhattan (rather than Brooklyn) address. Within months Bible Students were organized to distribute it door-to-door. He expanded the Society's printing facilities, revived the colporteur work and in 1920 introduced the requirement for weekly reports of Bible Students' preaching activity. He expanded and reorganized overseas branch offices in what he regarded as a "cleansing" and "sifting" work.

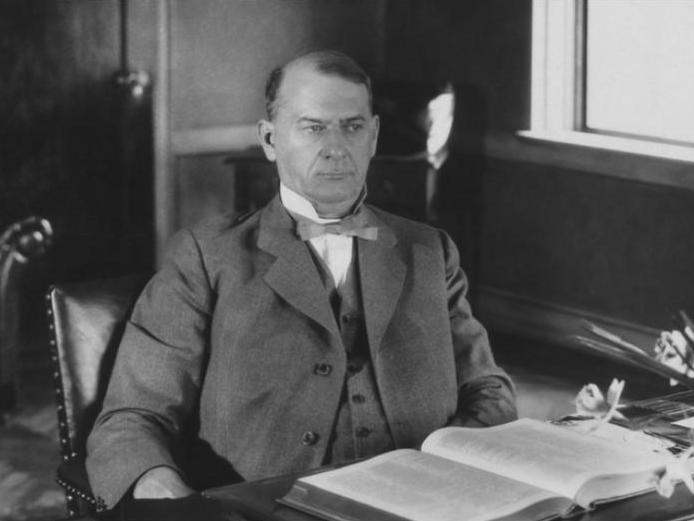
J.F. Rutherford

Beginning with an eight-day convention at Cedar Point, Ohio, in September 1922 Rutherford, launched a series of major international conventions under the theme "Advertise the King and Kingdom", attracting crowds of up to 20,000. Audiences were urged to "herald the message far and wide". He stressed that the primary duty of all Bible Students was to become "publicity agents" in fulfillment of Matthew 24:14, especially in the form of door-to-door evangelism with the Society's publications. In 1928 Rutherford began to teach that the Cedar Point convention and the events resulting from it fulfilled the prophecy of the 1290 days at Daniel 12:11.

In 1920, Rutherford published a booklet, Millions Now Living Will Never Die, and a year later published his first hardcover book, The Harp of God. This was followed by a further nineteen hardcover books, each with one-word titles, such as Creation (1927), Jehovah (1934) and Children (1941). His publications reached a total printing of 36 million copies. In 1925, he gained full control over what doctrines would be taught in Watch Tower Society publications, overruling the refusal by the five-man Editorial Committee to publish his article, "Birth of the Nation", which contained significant doctrinal changes.

Rutherford later claimed Satan had "tried to prevent the publication of that article ... but failed in that effort"; In 1927 the Watch Tower Society ceased printing of Russell's Studies in the Scriptures. The Editorial Committee was dissolved in 1931, after which Rutherford wrote every leading article in The Watch Tower until his death. The 1933 Watch Tower Society Yearbook observed that the demise of the Editorial Committee indicated "that the Lord himself is running his organization".

Rutherford expanded his means of spreading the Watch Tower message in 1924 with the start of 15-minute radio broadcasts, initially from WBBR, based on Staten Island, and eventually via a network of as many as 480 radio stations. A 1931 talk was broadcast throughout North America, Australia and France, but his attacks on the clergy resulted in both the NBC and BBC radio networks banning his broadcasts.

In 1928, Rutherford began to abolish the system of electing elders by congregational voting, dismissing them as "haughty" and "lazy", and finally asserting in 1932 that electing elders was unscriptural. He impressed on elders the need to obey the Society's "regulations", "instructions" and "directions" without complaint. Service directors, who reported back to Brooklyn, were appointed in each congregation and a weekly "service meeting" introduced to meeting programs. In 1933 Rutherford claimed that abolishing elective elders was a fulfillment of the prophecy of 2300 days at Daniel 8:13–14, and that God's sanctuary (the Watch Tower Society) was thereby cleansed.

At a 1931 Bible Student assembly in Columbus, Ohio, Rutherford proposed a new name for the organization, Jehovah's witnesses, to differentiate them from the proliferation of other groups that followed Russell's teachings. Bible Students who opposed or abandoned Rutherford to form new groups were increasingly described as the "evil servant class" by The Watchtower, which said it was wrong to pray for those who were "unfaithful". Four years later the term "Kingdom Hall" was introduced for the local meeting place of congregations.

In 1937, the door-to-door preaching program was extended to formally include "back calls" on interested people and Witnesses were urged to start one-hour Bible studies in the homes of householders. In the late 1930s, he advocated the use of "sound cars" and portable phonographs with which talks by Rutherford were played to passersby and householders.

In 1938, he introduced the term "theocracy" to describe the denomination's system of government, with Consolation explaining: "The Theocracy is at present administered by the Watch Tower Bible and Tract Society, of which Judge Rutherford is the president and general manager." "Zone servants" (now known as circuit overseers) were appointed to supervise congregations. In a Watchtower article Rutherford declared the need for congregations to "get in line" with the changed structure.

By 1942, the year of his death, worldwide attendance at the annual Memorial of Christ's death was 140,450 though his restructuring of the Bible Student community coincided with a dramatic loss of followers during the 1920s and 1930s. Worldwide attendance of the annual Memorial of Christ's death fell from 90,434 in 1925 to 17,380 in 1928. Memorial attendance figures did not surpass 90,000 again until 1940. Author Tony Wills, who analyzed attendance and "field worker" statistics, suggests it was the "more dedicated" Bible Students who quit through the 1920s, to be replaced by newcomers in larger numbers, although Rutherford dismissed the loss of the original Bible Students as the Lord "shaking out" the unfaithful. In the 1942 Yearbook of Jehovah's Witnesses, Rutherford wrote that the year's achievements "would, on the face of it, show that the Theocratic witness work on earth is about done".

=== Doctrinal changes ===
In July 1917, Rutherford had The Finished Mystery published as a seventh volume of the Studies in the Scriptures series. The volume, though written by Fisher and Woodworth, was advertised as Russell's "posthumous work" and "last legacy" but contained several interpretations and viewpoints not espoused by Russell, including an urging of all Bible Students to cast judgment upon Christendom and its clergy, the adoption of new dates for the fulfillment of particular prophecies, a claim that salvation is tied to membership within the Watch Tower Society, as well as shunning and censuring any who reject the interpretations given in the volume or related articles in Zion's Watch Tower magazine.

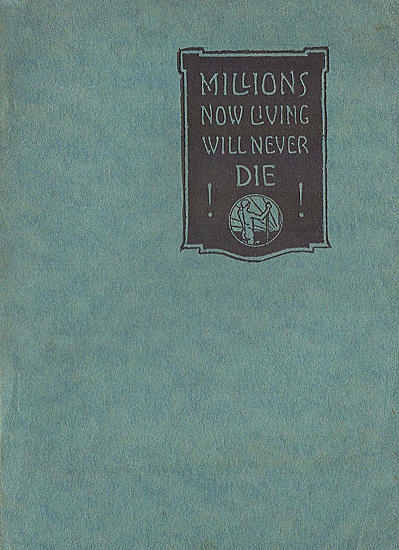
"Millions Now Living Will Never Die" contains some of the earliest doctrinal changes.

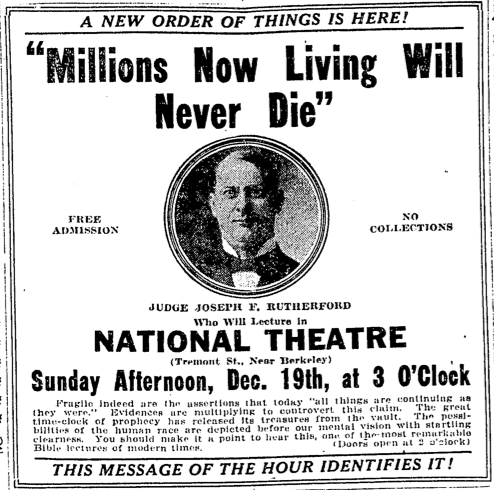
Newspaper advertisement for Rutherford's "Millions" lecture

In the February 1918 discourse "Millions Now Living Will Never Die" (printed in booklet form in May 1920) a revision of Russell's calculation of a "Jubilee type" was presented, changing it from 1875 to 1925, despite Russell's rejection of such a change a few months prior to his death. In October 1920 the Society published a new edition of Russell's 1881 Tabernacle Shadows of the Better Sacrifices. It included an appendix introducing many alterations or reinterpretations of Russell's original views on the death of Jesus and the role of Christ's followers in heaven as typified in the ceremonies of the Jewish tabernacle.

At the 1922 Cedar Point convention Rutherford began teaching that Christ's reign had begun in 1914, and not 1878 as Russell had taught. Rutherford expanded on this view in the March 1, 1925, issue of The Watch Tower in the article "Birth of The Nation", which he later acknowledged "caused a real stir or shake-up within the ranks." In 1927 he moved the date of the resurrection of the "sleeping saints" (all Christians who had died since Jesus' time) from 1878 to 1918 and as early as 1930 began to dismiss the year 1874 as the date for the invisible presence of Christ in favor of the year 1914.

From 1925 he developed the view of the battle of Armageddon as a universal war waged by God rather than Russell's belief that it was the decline of human society into social, political and religious anarchy. Rutherford based his interpretations on the books of Exodus, Jeremiah, Ezekiel and Psalms as well as additional material from the books of Samuel, Kings and Chronicles. An article in the January 1, 1926 Watch Tower introduced new emphasis on the importance of the name "Jehovah"; from 1929 Rutherford taught that the vindication of God's name—which would ultimately occur when millions of unbelievers were destroyed at Armageddon—was the primary doctrine of Christianity and more important than God's display of goodness or grace toward humankind. In 1932 he published an interpretation of a passage in Ezekiel describing the attack on Jerusalem by Gog of Magog, in which he predicted an intensification of persecution of Jehovah's Witnesses that would culminate in God intervening on their behalf to begin the battle of Armageddon, which would destroy all opposers of God's organization.

In 1926, he discredited Russell's teaching on the importance of Christian "character development" or personal "sanctification" and a year later discarded the teaching that Russell had been the "faithful and wise servant" of Matthew 24:45–47, warning that the desire to revere men was a snare set by the Devil. In May 1926 Rutherford released his book Deliverance at the Bible Student's convention in Kensington, England later interpreting the event as the fulfillment of the 1335 days of Daniel 12:12.

In 1927, Christmas was declared to be of pagan origin, and the following year its celebration by Bible Students was condemned as supporting "Satan's organization". Mother's Day was condemned in 1931, with other holidays as well as birthdays officially renounced in subsequent years.

In 1928, Rutherford discarded Russell's teaching that the natural Jews would be restored to Palestine and return to God's favor, despite having declared ten years earlier that prophecies of their restoration were already being fulfilled with the British takeover of Palestine from Turkey during World War I. He denied there was a role for Jews in God's Kingdom arrangement and by 1933 he had reversed Russell's earlier teaching, claiming that prominent Jewish business leaders were "arrogant, self-important and extremely selfish," and would gain no favored standing with God. The teaching that God would restore the Jews to Palestine was discontinued around the same time.

Russell's teaching that the Great Pyramid of Giza was built under God's direction was overturned in 1928, when Rutherford asserted that it had been built under the direction of Satan for the purpose of deceiving God's people in the last days. The announcement prompted further defections among long-time Bible Students.

In 1930, Rutherford published a systematic reinterpretation of the Book of Revelation. Many of the symbols recorded in the book were applied to events following 1918, specifically to Watch Tower conventions held in the years 1922 through 1928. These reinterpretations reflected both a wholesale rejection of his own earlier views as well as the historicist interpretations of Pastor Russell.

At a Washington, D.C. convention in 1935, Rutherford rejected Russell's teaching that the "great company" of Revelation 7:9 was a "secondary spiritual class" composed of millions of Christians who would be resurrected to heaven apart from the 144,000 "elect", and instead argued that the "great multitude", the "sheep" of Matthew 25 and the "Jonadabs" of 2 Kings chapter 10 all picture the people who could potentially survive Armageddon and receive everlasting human life on earth if they became Jehovah's Witnesses before it began.

In 1935, Rutherford objected to U.S. state laws requiring school students to salute the flag as a means of instilling patriotism; in the 1936 Yearbook he declared that baptized Jehovah's Witnesses who did salute the flag were breaking their covenant with God and were thus "guilty of death". In 1940, children in 43 states were expelled for refusing to salute the flag and the Watch Tower Society took most cases to court, with Rutherford personally leading the unsuccessful case of Minersville School District v. Gobitis. Controversy over the flag salute issue escalated and mob attacks became prevalent in many U.S. states until 1943 when the court overruled its previous decision in the case of West Virginia State Board of Education v. Barnette. A U.S. law magazine noted how Jehovah's Witnesses had helped shape the course of constitutional law, remarking: "Through almost constant litigation this organization had made possible an ever-increasing list of precedents concerning the application of the 14th amendment to freedom of speech and religion".

In 1936, Rutherford rejected the belief that Jesus had been executed on a Roman cross, in favor of an upright stake or "tree."

== Character and attitudes ==
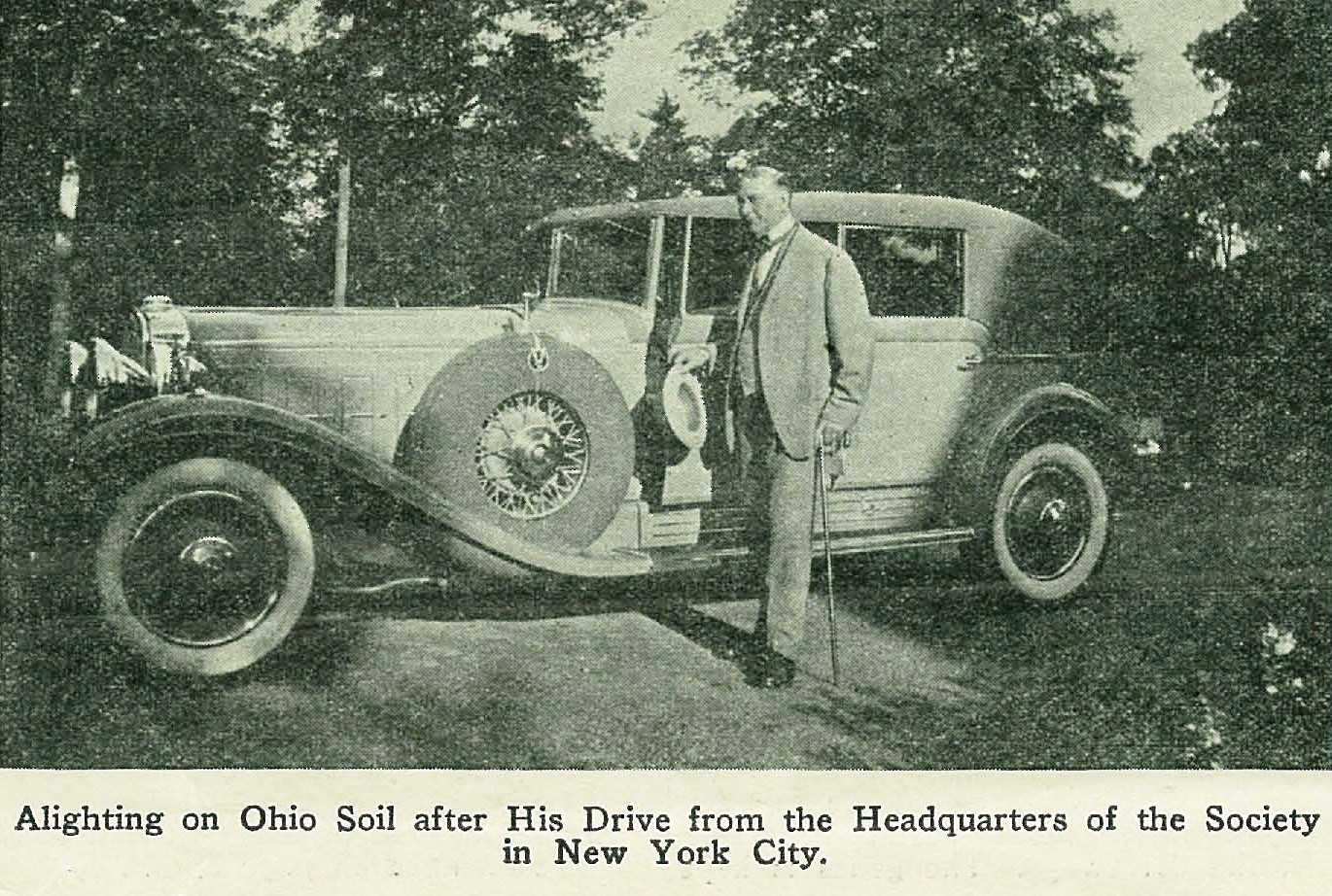
Rutherford with Cadillac V-16 from the Watchtower publication The Messenger (1931)

Biographers describe Rutherford as tall and solidly built with a senatorial demeanor, and a strong booming voice that helped make him a powerful orator. In 1917, The New York Times stated that Rutherford "has a reputation as an eloquent, forceful speaker". Watch Tower Society literature states that his personality contrasted strongly with that of his predecessor. One Watchtower history book says that while Russell was kind, warm and tactful, Rutherford "was warm and generous toward his associates but he was also a brusque and direct type of person, and his legal background and experiences in early life gave him a directness in his approach to problems in dealing with his brothers that caused some to take offense."

Another Watch Tower Society account says he did not hide his feelings, adding, "His bluntness, even when spoken in kindness, was sometimes misunderstood." Fellow Watch Tower Society director A. H. Macmillan says Rutherford "spoke as simply and directly to the people as he knew how, and he was an extremely forthright man. He was thoroughly convinced that what he had to say was the truth and that it was a matter of life and death." Macmillan added, "He would never tolerate anything that would be contrary to what he clearly understood the Bible to teach. He was so strict about that, he would permit nothing that would seem to show a compromise when it came to an issue of the truth."

Author Tony Wills describes him as charitable and generous, and says his sympathy for the poor and oppressed was exceeded only by his hatred for the rich, the oppressors. Wills also notes that he was a dynamic, impatient extrovert. Other authors also address Rutherford's abrasiveness: James Penton describes him as blunt and moody with an explosive temper, with "a streak of self-righteousness which caused him to regard anyone who opposed him as of the Devil", while Alan Rogerson notes that he was a "dogmatic and insensitive person, obsessed with his own self-importance."

Rutherford's confrontation with four Watch Tower Society directors who opposed him in 1917 highlighted both the forcefulness of his personality and his determination to fight for what he believed was right. Penton claims Rutherford played "hard-fisted church politics" and Rogerson accuses Rutherford of using The Watchtower as a propaganda medium to attack his opposers in what was effectively a battle for his position as president. At the heart of his opponents' complaints was his "autocratic" behavior as he strove to "exercise complete management of the Society and its affairs."

Penton similarly describes Rutherford's actions in his first year of presidency—including his appointment of new directors, refusal to allow the Society's accounts to be examined, and his unilateral decision to publish The Finished Mystery—as high-handed and secretive. In contrast, Rutherford claimed, "It was my duty to use the power the Lord had put into my hands to support the interests of the shareholders and all others interested in the Truth throughout the world ... to be unfaithful to them would be unfaithful to the Lord." Macmillan, who supported Rutherford throughout the crisis, claimed the president was extremely patient and "did everything that he could to help his opposers see their mistake, holding a number of meetings with them, trying to reason with them and show them how contrary their course was to the Society's charter".

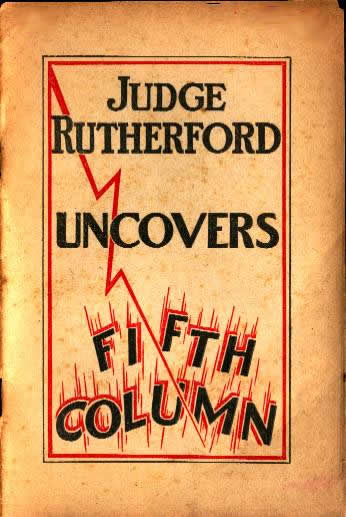
Rutherfords's 1940 booklet, Fifth Column, accused the Catholic Church of promoting mob violence against Jehovah's Witnesses.

According to Wills, Rutherford emerged from prison in 1919 bitter against the world and the collusion he saw between the clergy and military that had secured his imprisonment. Soon after his release he coined the term "Satan's organization" to refer to this supposed conspiracy. In Watchtower articles Rutherford was similarly scathing towards big business, politics and the League of Nations. Rogerson describes Rutherford's attitude towards the clergy—his avowed enemies—as "unadulterated hatred".

His attacks on clergymen, particularly those of the Catholic Church, from the late 1920s were strong enough to attract a ban on his broadcasts by the NBC radio network, which condemned his "rabid attack upon organized religion and the clergy". He also applied criticizing terms to those who had deserted Watch Tower ranks, calling them the "evil servant". He urged readers to view with contempt anyone who had "openly rebelled against God's order or commandments" and also described elective elders of the 1930s who refused to submit to Watch Tower Society administrative changes as "despicable".

Wills states that Rutherford seemed to relish his descriptions of how completely the wicked would be destroyed at Armageddon, dwelling at great length on prophecies of destruction. He claims that towards the close of his ministry Rutherford spent about half of each year's Watchtowers writing about Armageddon.

According to Penton, Rutherford's austerity—evidenced by his distaste for Christmas, birthday parties and other popular customs that were described as of pagan origin or that encouraged idolatry and were not to be observed—led in turn to austerity becoming a part of Witness life. In 1938, he directed that singing be dispensed with at congregation meetings; singing was reinstated soon after his death.

Rutherford's books and magazine articles reveal his strong views on "the proper place of women" in the church and society. In a 1931 book he linked the post-1919 rise of women's movements that encouraged equality of the sexes with satanic influence, and claimed the custom of men tipping their hats to women or standing when a woman approached was a scheme of the devil to turn men from God and indicated an effeminate streak in men who practiced the custom. Mother's Day was similarly described as part of a plan to turn people away from God. In 1938 he urged adherents to delay marriage and child-bearing until after Armageddon, which Wills claims prompted a strong community bias among Witnesses against marriage. Those who did marry, says Wills, were considered to be weak in faith. At a 1941 convention in Missouri he quoted Rudyard Kipling's description of women as "a rag and a bone and a hank of hair".

Former Jehovah's Witness and former Governing Body member Raymond Franz claimed there was no evidence Rutherford engaged in door-to-door ministry despite his assertion that it was a requirement and sacred duty of all Witnesses. Franz claimed to have heard Rutherford's associates say his responsibilities as president "do not permit his engaging in this activity". Macmillan, however, related details of Rutherford's home preaching in 1905 or 1906 when he was baptized, and a 1975 article quoted several Witnesses relating their experiences with Rutherford in the house-to-house ministry in the 1920s. The official history of Jehovah's Witnesses also notes, "Rutherford personally shared with other conventioners as they engaged in the work of Kingdom proclamation from house to house." On August 2, 1928, in a meeting with the Bible Student elders who had attended a general convention in Detroit, Michigan Rutherford listed his responsibilities and concluded "when I have attended to many other details, I have not had very much time to go from door to door."

Authors William Whalen and James Penton have claimed that Rutherford was to Russell what Brigham Young was to Mormon prophet Joseph Smith. Penton contends that both Russell and Smith were capable religious leaders but naive visionaries, while Rutherford and Young were "hard-bitten pragmatists who gave a degree of permanency to the movements they dominated".

== Personal life ==
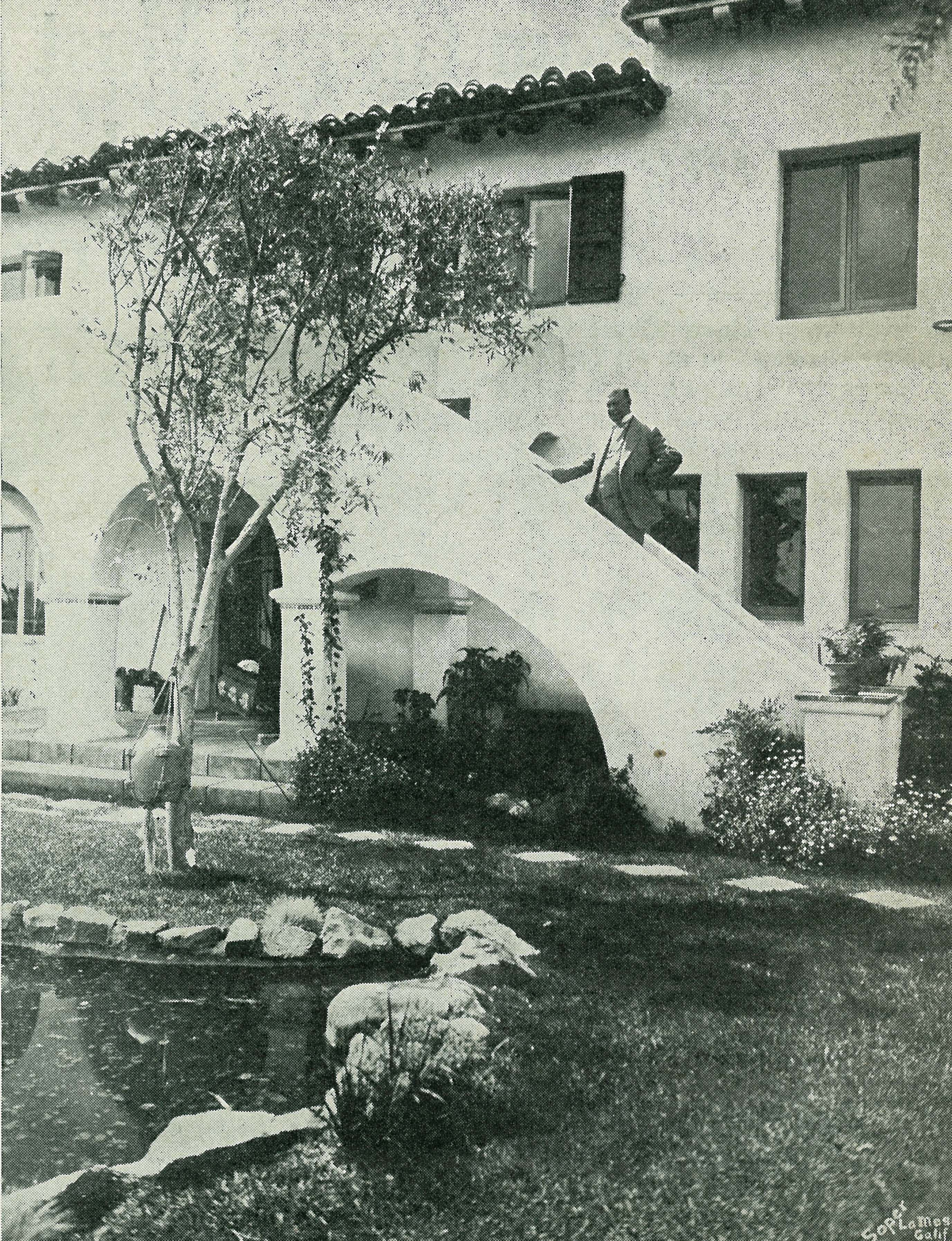
Beth Sarim was built in San Diego, California, in 1929. Rutherford died at the property in 1942.

Rutherford, a Baptist, married Mary Malcolm Fetzer, a Presbyterian, in Boonville, Missouri, on December 31, 1891. Around the time of the marriage, Rutherford became an atheist. Their only child, Malcolm, was born on November 10, 1892. The couple joined the Bible Student movement in the early 20th century and separated after Joseph Rutherford became president of the Watch Tower Society. Mary remained an active member of the Jehovah's Witnesses until becoming confined to her home in the years before her death in 1962 at age 93.

Rutherford had reportedly lost the use of one lung from pneumonia suffered during his imprisonment in 1918 and 1919 and was encouraged by a doctor to "spend as much time as possible" in a more favorable climate. In 1929, a residence named Beth Sarim (literally, House of Princes) was constructed at San Diego, California, for Rutherford's use as a winter accommodation. He died at the property in 1942. The villa was sold in 1948, with The Watchtower declaring, "It had fully served its purpose and was now only serving as a monument quite expensive to keep."

The standard of Rutherford's accommodation and his personal conduct attracted criticism from some Bible Students and Jehovah's Witnesses in the 1930s. Walter F. Salter, the Society's former branch manager in Canada, wrote a public letter to Rutherford in 1937, the month he was expelled from the group, claiming that Rutherford had exclusive use of "luxurious" and "expensive" residences (in Brooklyn, Staten Island, Germany, and San Diego), as well as two Cadillacs and alleged that on more than one occasion he had purchased for Rutherford cases of whiskey, brandy, beer and other liquors, and 'go from "drink to drink"'.

In July 1939 Olin R. Moyle, legal counsel for the Society, wrote an open letter of resignation to the president, in which he complained about behavior of some members of the Watch Tower Society, including Rutherford himself, that he considered excessive and inappropriate. Moyle mentioned California when discussing "the difference between the accommodations furnished to you, and your personal attendants, compared with those furnished to some of your brethren." Moyle also accused Rutherford of "unkind treatment of the staff, outbursts of anger, discrimination and vulgar language" and condemned his allowing the "glorification of alcohol" at Bethel. Penton notes that Moyle was a "teetotaller" and "puritanical", but claims Rutherford's drinking habits were "notorious" and cites unnamed former Brooklyn Bethel workers who told of occasional difficulties in getting Rutherford to the podium to give public talks due to inebriation.

== Death and burial ==
From the age of 70, Rutherford underwent several medical treatments for cancer of the colon. This included an operation on November 5, 1941, which found "carcinoma of the rectal sigmoid". Doctors gave him less than six months to live. Rutherford died at Beth Sarim on January 8, 1942, at the age of 72. Cause of death was "uraemia due to carcinoma of the rectum due to pelvic metastasis."

A Watch Tower Society staff member said of the announcement of Rutherford's death, "It was at noontime when the family was assembled for lunch. ... The announcement was brief. There were no speeches. No one took the day off to mourn. Rather, we went back to the factory and worked harder than ever."

Rutherford's burial was delayed for five months due to legal proceedings arising from his desire to be buried at Beth Sarim, which he had previously expressed to three close advisers from Brooklyn headquarters. According to Consolation, "Judge Rutherford looked for the early triumph of 'the King of the East', Christ Jesus, now leading the host of heaven, and he desired to be buried at dawn facing the rising sun, in an isolated part of the ground which would be administered by the princes, who should return from their graves." Based on his claims that resurrected biblical characters would live at Beth Sarim, Rutherford concluded that it was appropriate that his bones be buried on the property.

The legal problem arose because Beth Sarim was not a legally zoned cemetery. Witnesses collected more than 14,000 signatures for two petitions—one supporting his burial at Beth Sarim, another for a second preferred site on a nearby Watch Tower Society property named Beth-Shan—that Rutherford's dying wish might be granted. Consolation condemned San Diego County officials for their refusal to grant a permit for Rutherford's burial at either property, stating "It was not the fate of the bones which they decided, but their own destiny. Nor is their blood on anyone else's head, because they were told three times that to fight against God, or to tamper with His servant's bones even, would bring upon them the condemnation of the Lord. ... So their responsibility is fixed, and they followed the course of Satan."

Speculation that Rutherford was secretly buried at Beth Sarim has been called "private rumor", 'frequently disproven', and "myth". The May 4, 1942, issue of Time magazine noted Rutherford's burial at Rossville, New York, on Staten Island; a private burial plot for Watch Tower branch volunteers is on Woodrow Road. In 2002, a caretaker at the immediately adjoining graveyard answered an inquiry about Watch Tower's graveyard by noting, "I couldn't tell you who is buried on it because it has absolutely no markers or headstones".

Rutherford was succeeded by Nathan Homer Knorr as president of the Watch Tower Society.

== Bibliography ==
=== Books ===
- Rutherford, Joseph Franklin (1895). Laws of Missouri. Compilation of the Laws and Legal Forms for the Convenience of Farmers and Mechanics, Merchants and Bankers. Business Manual. Boonville, Missouri: Boonville Advertiser.
- ———— (c. 1906). Man's Salvation From a Lawyer's Viewpoint.
- ———— (1921). The Harp of God. Brooklyn: Watch Tower Bible and Tract Society, International Bible Students Association.
- ———— (1925). Comfort for the Jews.
- ———— (1926). Deliverance.
- ———— (1927). Creation.
- ———— (1928). Government.
- ———— (1928). Reconciliation.
- ———— (1929). Life.
- ———— (1929). Prophecy.
- ———— (1930). Light. Vol. 1.
- ———— (1930). Light. Vol. 2.
- ———— (1931). Vindication. Vol. 1.
- ———— (1932). Vindication. Vol. 2.
- ———— (1932). Vindication. Vol. 3.
- ———— (1932). Preservation.
- ———— (1933). Preparation.
- ———— (1934). Jehovah.
- ———— (1936). Riches.
- ———— (1937). Enemies.
- ———— (1939). Salvation.
- ———— (1940). Religion.
- ———— (1941). Children.

=== Magazines ===
- Rutherford, Joseph Franklin, ed. (December 1, 1916 – October 1, 1931). The Watch Tower and Herald of Christ's Presence. Vols. XXXVII–LII. Brooklyn: Watch Tower Bible and Tract Society.
- ———— (April 1917). "The Late Pastor Russell". Overland Monthly. Vol. LXVIII, no. 4. San Francisco: Overland Monthly Company. pp. 296–302.

== Bibliography ==
- 1930 Year Book of the International Bible Students Association (PDF), International Bible Students Association, 1930
- 1931 Year Book of the International Bible Students Association. Watch Tower Bible & Tract Society.
- 1933 Year Book of Jehovah's Witnesses. Watch Tower Bible & Tract Society.
- 1942 Yearbook of Jehovah's Witnesses. Watch Tower Bible & Tract Society.
- 1975 Yearbook of Jehovah's Witnesses, Watch Tower Bible & Tract Society, 1975
- 1991 Yearbook of Jehovah's Witnesses, Watch Tower Bible & Tract Society, 1991
- Beckford, James A. (1975). The Trumpet of Prophecy: A Sociological Study of Jehovah's Witnesses. Oxford: Basil Blackwell. ISBN 0-631-16310-7.
- Jehovah's Witnesses in the Divine Purpose, Watch Tower Bible & Tract Society, 1959 – via Open Library
- Jehovah's Witnesses – Proclaimers of God's Kingdom, Watch Tower Bible & Tract Society, 1993
- Johnson, Paul S.L. (November 1, 1917), Harvest Siftings Reviewed (PDF), archived from the original (PDF) on July 15, 2011
- Macmillan, A.H. (1957), Faith on the March, Prentice-Hall
- Neutrality, Watch Tower Bible & Tract Society, 1939
- Penton, James M. (1997), Apocalypse Delayed: The Story of Jehovah's Witnesses (2nd ed.), University of Toronto Press, ISBN 0-8020-7973-3
- Pierson, A. N.; et al. (September 1, 1917), Light After Darkness (PDF)
- Rogerson, Alan (1969), Millions Now Living Will Never Die, Constable, London, ISBN 0-09-455940-6
- Rutherford, J. F. (August 1, 1917), Harvest Siftings (PDF), Watch Tower Bible & Tract Society, archived from the original (PDF) on July 15, 2011
- Rutherford, J. F. (October 1, 1917), Harvest Siftings, Part II (PDF), Watch Tower Bible & Tract Society, archived from the original (PDF) on July 15, 2011
- Wills, Tony (2006), A People For His Name, Lulu Enterprises, ISBN 978-1-4303-0100-4
- Year Book of Jehovah's Witnesses for 1936, Watch Tower Bible & Tract Society, 1936

Preceded by Charles Taze Russell	President of Watch Tower Bible and Tract Society; January 6, 1917 – January 8, 1942	Succeeded by Nathan H. Knorr
