= Leaving the Witness =

2019 book by Amber Scorah

Leaving The Witness: Exiting a Religion and Finding a Life is a 2019 memoir by Amber Scorah about her life growing up as a Jehovah's Witness, becoming a missionary in China, and starting to question her faith.

== Summary ==
Scorah grew up in Vancouver, where she noticed that Chinese immigrants were more receptive to her preaching. This experience inspired her to move to Shanghai with her husband to become a missionary. The denomination is banned in China so they preached clandestinely. They held weekly meetings for Westerners in hotels that they called "parties" and did not invite Chinese people to them in order to maintain secrecy. When preaching, the goal was to make friends that were not associated with the Communist Party. Missionaries would never tell their friends that they were Jehovah's Witnesses and would instead simply talk about the Bible. Missionaries were required to support themselves financially, with most in China making a living teaching English and being hired with fake degrees. Scorah becomes friends with a young woman named Jean and starts talking about the Bible once told about her grandmother's death. As the two grow closer, Jean teaches her about Confucianism, which causes Scorah to reflect on her own beliefs. Scorah gets a new job with a language-learning podcast studio. She gets emails sent from fans and starts regularly chatting with one named Jonathan. He challenges her beliefs further. The two become very close and Scorah realizes that she does not really love her husband anymore but that they're stuck together. She ends up having an affair and is eventually disfellowshipped. Scorah starts spending more time with her coworkers and learns about pop culture and politics. She decides that it would be too painful to return to Vancouver (where her family would shun her) so she decides to move to New York City. Scorah has a difficult time finding a job due to her lack of formal education and the 2008 financial crisis. She gets hired a few months later, finds a new boyfriend, and has a baby that dies while attending daycare at four months old. The book ends with her grieving this loss and understanding why people turn to religion for answers even if she cannot think that way anymore.

== Reception ==
Scorah was interviewed about the memoir on NPR. A reviewer for the Los Angeles Review of Books positively reviewed the book and stated that it "offers an intimate — at times painful, at times humorous — exploration of what it means to leave not only a religion, but an entire life". Kirkus Reviews praised Scorah for her description of cultural conflicts she faced as a missionary in China, but also criticized the book for sometimes becoming a "salacious tell-all". A reviewer for Asian Review of Books found Scorah's description of clandestinely preaching in China (where the denomination is banned) to be one the most interesting parts of the memoir.

== See also ==
- Bibliography of works on Jehovah's Witnesses
- Censorship in China
