= Demographics of Jehovah's Witnesses =

As of 2025, Jehovah's Witnesses reported a monthly average membership of approximately 9 million actively involved in preaching, with a peak of around 9.2 million. Jehovah's Witnesses have an active presence in most countries, though they do not form a large part of the population of any country.

To be counted as an active member, an individual must be a publisher, and report some amount of time preaching to non-members. Jehovah's Witnesses' preaching activity is self-reported, and members are directed to submit a 'Field Service Report' each month. Baptized members who fail to submit a report every month are termed 'irregular'. Those who do not submit a report for six continuous months are termed 'inactive'.

== Membership activity ==
A chart of active Jehovah's Witnesses by year, 1931-2015

For 2025, around 304,500 new members were baptized. The Watch Tower Society reported that Jehovah's Witnesses conducted about 7.6 million home Bible studies with non-members, including Bible studies conducted by Witness parents with their children.

Jehovah's Witnesses' official statistics only count as members those who submit reports for preaching activity, usually resulting in lower membership numbers than those found by external surveys. For example, in 2014 Jehovah's Witnesses reported approximately 1.2 million active publishers in the United States, whereas the Pew Research Center reported that Jehovah's Witnesses made up 0.8% of the US population (approximately 2.5 million) in that year. Their official statistics indicate membership according to various territories—which they refer to as "lands"—many of which are not independent countries.

According to official statistics, about 20.5 million people worldwide attended Jehovah's Witnesses' 2025 observance of the Memorial of Christ's death (also termed the Lord's Evening Meal). Of those, around 24,600 people partook of the memorial emblems of unleavened bread and wine. Those who partake profess to be of the 144,000 "anointed" and hope to go to heaven, based on their interpretation of Revelation 14:1.

Congregations are generally organized geographically, and members are directed to attend the Kingdom Hall to which their neighborhood has been assigned, resulting in an ethnic mix generally representative of the local population, though congregations based on language and ethnicity have also been formed.

== Statistics ==
| Year | 'Lands' | Average active publishers | Increase over previous year | Congregations | Average Bible studies | Memorial attendance | Memorial partakers |
|---|---|---|---|---|---|---|---|
| 2020 | 240 | 8,424,185 | -0.6% | 120,387 | 7,705,765 | 17,844,773 | 21,182 |
| 2021 | 239 | 8,480,147 | 0.7% | 119,297 | 5,908,167 | 21,367,603 | 20,746 |
| 2022 | 239 | 8,514,983 | 0.4% | 117,960 | 5,666,996 | 19,721,672 | 21,150 |
| 2023 | 239 | 8,625,042 | 1.3% | 118,177 | 7,281,212 | 20,461,767 | 22,312 |
| 2024 | 240 | 8,828,124 | 2.4% | 118,767 | 7,480,146 | 21,119,442 | 23,212 |
| 2025 | 241 | 9,047,083 | 2.5% | 119,652 | 7,603,182 | 20,635,015 | 24,576 |

== See also ==
- Jehovah's Witnesses by country
- Jehovah's Witnesses membership statistics
