= Amber Scorah =

Canadian-American writer, speaker, entrepreneur and activist

- Born: Canada
- Education: Harvard Divinity School, The City University of New York, CUNY Baccalaureate for Unique and Interdisciplinary Studies
- Website: www.amberscorah.com

Amber Scorah is a Canadian-American writer, speaker, entrepreneur and activist.

== Early life ==
She grew up as a third-generation Jehovah's Witness in Vancouver, British Columbia, Canada, with her parents and sister and rarely had contact with non-Jehovah's Witnesses. She forwent a formal education and career and instead went into the full-time volunteer preaching work immediately after graduating high school. When she was 22 years old she married a Jehovah's Witness elder and they moved to China to become missionaries. Scorah began speaking out publicly about her life as a Jehovah's Witness in 2013, and in 2019 published a memoir called Leaving the Witness.

== Education ==
In 2010, Scorah enrolled at the City University of New York and attended Hunter College. She took a break in 2015, then resumed her studies in spring 2019. She graduated from the CUNY Baccalaureate for Unique and Interdisciplinary Studies in 2020 with a concentration in English and the Psychology of Religion at Hunter College's program in religion.

== Advocacy ==
In 2015, Scorah's three-month-old son died unexpectedly on his first day of daycare in SoHo, New York. The daycare had been operating without a license and was shut down shortly after the incident. A staff member stated that she had noticed Karl kicking in his crib but she was told by a supervisor to ignore it because that's what babies do. He was found unresponsive with "blue lips" a short time later, and pronounced dead at the hospital. Scorah had not felt ready to go back to work and leave him at daycare, and the incident drove her into activism.

Scorah authored a viral article for The New York Times' Motherlode blog about the incident, arguing that mandatory paid parental leave is necessary. In February 2016, she attended New York City mayor Bill de Blasio's speech where he discussed his policy mandating 6 weeks' paid parental leave for non-union city employees. She called this policy change a "baby step." In August 2016, Scorah delivered petitions to both the Trump and Clinton presidential campaigns pushing for federally mandated paid leave. Both politicians have spoken favorably of the concept. Donald Trump pitched a plan for how he could institute 6 weeks' paid parental leave. Scorah says this is progress but it's not enough. In 2017, CNN correspondent Clare Sebastian named Amber as her "hero" for "...her bravery in turning such a tragic event into public and heartfelt campaign." That same year Brooklyn Magazine named her one of their top "100 Influencers in Brooklyn Culture" for her parental leave advocacy.

In 2020, Scorah co-founded Lioness, an organization that "help[s] people navigate the process of speaking out against workplace mistreatment." She also founded Psst.org, a website where people can submit encrypted whisteblowing reports about their employers.

== Publications ==
=== Books ===
- Scorah, Amber (2019). Leaving the Witness: Exiting Religion And Finding A Life. Viking Press. ISBN 9780735222540.

=== Podcasts ===
- Scorah, Amber (2007–2009). Dear Amber (Podcast). ChinesePod.
