= George D. Chryssides =

British theologian (born 1945)

- Born: George David Chryssides; 1945 (age 80–81)
- Occupations: Theologian, writer, philosopher, university teacher

Academic background
- Education: Doctor of Philosophy
- Alma mater: University of Oxford

Academic work
- Institutions: University of Birmingham

George David Chryssides (born 1945) is a British academic and researcher on new religious movements. He has taught at several British universities, becoming head of Religious studies at the University of Wolverhampton in 2001. He is an honorary research fellow in contemporary religion at York St John University and the University of Birmingham.

Chryssides is the author of several books and articles, with an interest in the academic study of new religious movements. He is president of the International Society for the Study of New Religions, and a Governor of INFORM (Information Network Focus on Religious Movements), based at King's College London.

== Education ==
Chryssides holds a first-class honours B.D. in systematic theology from the University of Glasgow. He obtained a first-class honours MA degree in philosophy at the University of Glasgow. Since 1974, Chryssides holds a Ph.D. in philosophy of religion from the University of Oxford, with the thesis An examination of some problems concerning the philosophical analysis of religious language.

== Teaching ==
Chryssides has taught at various British universities. He started teaching religious studies at the University of Wolverhampton in 1992. He found it difficult to find enough scholarly work detailing new religious movements in order to teach about the subject and started collecting primary source materials to research and utilize instead. Chryssides became acquainted with a Jehovah's Witness and would invite him to speak when introducing the denomination to his students. Chryssides was the Head of Religious Studies at the institution from 2001 to 2008.

== Academic work ==
Since the 1980s, Chryssides's main interest has been new religious movements. Chryssides favours a simple definition of "new religious movement" as an organization founded "within the past 150 or so years" that cannot be easily classified within one of the world's main religious traditions.

=== Studies on Jehovah's Witnesses ===
George D. Chryssides is widely recognized by peers as the world's leading academic expert on Jehovah's Witnesses. Chryssides has been described by fellow sociologist James T. Richardson as "one of the leading scholars" of Jehovah's Witness.

Ex-members testimony

According to Chryssides, hostile criticism of Jehovah's Witnesses from ex-members who seek to discredit the Watch Tower Society are lacking because Jehovah's Witnesses tend to avoid outside reading, so outsiders tend to be unaware of outside scholarship. Chryssides has said that he learned useful information from critical ex-members of the Jehovah's Witnesses although accounts by critical former members may be biased. Chrissides also wrote that:

In recent times, a different form of opposition emerged from ex-members, assisted by the rise of the internet, who have organized themselves and formed networks. Since the more vociferous ex-members have the highest visibility, it is easy to assume them to be typical of ex-members more widely, but the evidence suggests otherwise (Chryssides 2019: 371–92). Some have expressed their experiences in autobiographies and novels, of which there are now over fifty. Ex-member testimony should not be discounted, and these narratives often highlight details of what is involved in belonging to the organization; however, it is difficult to assess their veracity, since ex-members frequently collude, misremember and become influenced by the anticult organizations and the media.

== Works ==
=== Thesis ===
- Chryssides, George D. (1974). An examination of some problems concerning the philosophical analysis of religious language (D. Phil. University of Oxford). OCLC 43196874.

=== Books ===
- —— (1991). The Advent of Sun Myung Moon: The Origins, Beliefs and Practices of the Unification Church. UK: Palgrave Macmillan. ISBN 978-0-333-49698-5.
- —— (1998). The Elements of Unitarianism. Element Books. ISBN 1-86204-247-0.
- —— (1999). Exploring New Religions. London: Cassell. ISBN 0-304-33651-3.
- —— (2001). Historical Dictionary of New Religious Movements. Lanham, Md; London: Scarecrow Press. ISBN 0-8108-4095-2.
- —— (2003). Unitarian Perspectives on Contemporary Social Issues. London: Lindsey Press.
- —— (2008). Historical Dictionary of Jehovah's Witnesses. Lanham, Md: Scarecrow Press. ISBN 978-0-8108-6074-2.
- —— (2009). The A to Z of Jehovah's Witnesses. Lanham, Md: Scarecrow Press. ISBN 978-0-8108-6891-5.
- —— (2010). Christianity Today. Continuum. ISBN 978-1-8470-6542-1.
- —— (2011). Christians in the Twenty-First Century. Equinox. ISBN 978-1-84553-213-0.
- —— (2013). The Study of Religion:An Introduction to Key Ideas and Methods 2nd. Bloomsbury. ISBN 978-1-78093-840-0.
- ——; Zeller, Benjamin E., eds. (2014). The Bloomsbury Companion to New Religious Movements. London: Bloomsbury Publishing. ISBN 978-1-4411-9005-5.
  - ——; Zeller, Benjamin E., eds. (2026). The Bloomsbury Companion to New Religious Movements (2nd ed.). London: Bloomsbury Publishing. ISBN 978-1-350-55935-6.
- —— (2016). Jehovah's Witnesses Continuity and Change. Ashgate new religions. Farnham, Surrey: Ashgate Publishing. ISBN 978-1-4094-5608-7. (Reprint: London; New York: Routledge, 2016).
- —— (2022). Jehovah's Witnesses: A New Introduction. Bloomsbury Academic. ISBN 978-1-3501-9089-4.

=== Articles ===
- —— (2000). "Is God a Space Alien? The Cosmology of the Raëlian Church". Culture and Cosmos. 4 (1): 36–53. doi:10.46472/CC.0104.0207.
- —— (Winter 2000). "The New Age: A Survey and Critique". Global Dialogue. 2 (1): 109–119. ISSN 1450-0590.
- —— (1997). "New Religious Movements - Some Problems of Definition". Internet Journal of Religion. Archived from the original on 3 September 2010.
- —— (2010). "How Prophecy Succeeds: The Jehovah's Witnesses and Prophetic Expectations". International Journal for the Study of New Religions. 1 (1): 39. doi:10.1558/ijsnr.v1i1.27. ISSN 2041-952X.

== See also ==
- Bibliography of works on Jehovah's Witnesses
- James Penton
- Zoe Knox
