= English as a Second Language Podcast =

- Other names: ESLPod, ESL Podcast
- Genre: Educational, Language course
- Running time: Lesson Shows – 15 to 30 minutes (average)
- Country of origin: United States
- Language: English
- Starring: Jeff McQuillan; Lucy Tse
- Recording studio: Los Angeles
- Original release: July 2005
- No. of episodes: 1800+ lesson shows (as of 4 May 2020)
- Audio format: MP3
- Website: www.eslpod.com
- Podcast: Feed

English as a Second Language (ESL) Podcast is a web-based English language-learning podcast. It is the first and longest-running English language learning podcast on the Internet. It was launched in July 2005 by two former university professors, Dr. Jeff McQuillan and Dr. Lucy Tse of the Center for Educational Development in Los Angeles, California. ESL Podcast produces four main services: free audio lessons, supplementary Learning Guides, a blog on American culture and English learning, and specialty courses.

== Overview ==
The purpose of English as a Second Language Podcast is to teach English by using everyday phrases and expressions spoken at a slow rate of speech, followed by explanations of what these expressions mean and how to use them. Learners access the lessons for free on the website or via a piece of podcast/RSS feed software such as iTunes. ESL Podcast uses a pedagogical approach based upon research in second language acquisition focusing on providing comprehensible input in a relaxed, friendly atmosphere.

ESL Podcast is intended for intermediate and advanced English learners and consists of three weekly episodes: two dialog-based episodes (Mondays and Fridays) and the longer, culturally-focused English Café (Wednesdays). Dialog-based episodes contain a slow reading of an exchange in conversational English, followed by an explanation of the key vocabulary, and then a native-rate reading of the same dialog. The English Café typically covers two major topics of cultural importance to learners of American English, followed by a short question-and-answer segment based on listener input.

Since 2005, ESL Podcast has released more than 1000 self-contained episodes. It is not a traditional course, with a beginning and an end, and there are no quizzes or exercises. The episodes are not sequenced but are based on a set of broad themes from which the learner can choose, such as English for business, travel, daily life, health and fitness, shopping, and more.

Supplementary materials are available for each lesson in the form of an 8-10 page PDF Learning Guide, available to subscribers of the podcast for a fixed monthly fee. Like other popular language podcasts such as ChinesePod, ESL Podcast uses a "freemium" business model, where the audio files are provided for free but the supplementary materials require a paid membership.

== Hosts ==
Both of the co-founders of ESL Podcast received their Ph.D.s in applied linguistics at the University of Southern California in 1997. Prior to joining the Center for Educational Development, Dr. Lucy Tse worked as a tenure-track university professor at Arizona State University, California State University, Los Angeles, and Loyola Marymount University. Dr. Jeff McQuillan was a tenure-track professor at Arizona State University and California State University, Fullerton. Both have published several dozen articles and books on topics in applied linguistics. They have each appeared on CNN, and have been cited and published in numerous regional and national publications, included the Los Angeles Times, Los Angeles Daily News, San Francisco Chronicle, and others.

== Popularity ==
Stories or features about ESL Podcast have appeared in several international media outlets in the United States, Latin America, Asia, and Europe. iTunes Japan named ESL Podcast one of the Best 20 podcasts in Japan in 2007. ESL Podcast has consistently been ranked the number one English language learning podcast in iTunes since its launch in 2005, and among the Top 20 podcasts for all categories in several European, Asian, and Latin American countries with a dedicated iTunes Store in 2011.
