= ChinesePod =

Chinese language learning platform

- Other names: CPod
- Genre: Educational; language course; mobile learning
- Running time: Lesson shows – 8 to 20 minutes (average)
- Country of origin: China
- Languages: English; Standard Mandarin
- Hosted by: Fiona Tian; Gwilym; Constance Fang; Ariel Jenny Zhu; David Xu; Ryan; John Pasden; Connie Cheng; Jenny Zhu; Lu Jiaojie; Ken Carroll; Peter Braden; Li Dilu; Vera Zhang; Tom; Greg
- Recording studio: Hong Kong
- Original release: October 2005 – present date
- No. of episodes: 4500+ shows (as of May 9, 2018)
- Audio format: MP3
- Website: chinesepod.com

ChinesePod is a web-based Chinese language-learning service composed of multiple key components: video and audio lessons, mobile apps and exercises for characters, pronunciation and dialogue. There are also virtual classroom sessions for private lessons with Mandarin Chinese teachers. The service was founded in June 2004 in Shanghai, by Ken Carroll, Hank Horkoff, and Steve Williams.

== Overview ==
ChinesePod is a Mandarin Chinese learning platform that provides video and audio lessons, mobile study tools and exercise, as well as individual online tutoring lessons, which are designed for learners of every level. The company mission is "to make language learning easier for adult students". Learners can access content via YouTube, smart phones, RSS feeds, and directly from ChinesePod.com.

Since 2005, ChinesePod has published over 4000+ audio and video lessons, each between ten and twenty minutes in length. Lesson content is divided into six difficulty levels (Newbie, elementary, intermediate, upper-intermediate, advanced, and media) and learners choose their own lessons depending on their interests and needs. Alternatively, they can choose from a selection of ready-made playlists. ChinesePod has several features to choose from including HSK Prep, Situational Video Lessons, Engaging Audio Lessons, Interactive Chinese Dictionary, Supportive Online Forum, Pinyin Program, a Placement Test, and a Say it Right Series. Between November 2005 and February 2006, ChinesePod was among the top five world podcasts at Yahoo.com and received a total of 1.2 million downloads.

The Chinese host is typically complemented by a native English speaker who helps to explain the content of the lesson. Founder Ken Carroll appears in the earlier Newbie and Elementary lessons and was later succeeded by John Pasden between 2007 and 2013. John left ChinesePod in January 2014 to work on his company, AllSet Learning. Jenny "J-Dog" Zhu is the main Chinese host and was later joined by Li Dilu in late 2010, with Vera Zhang becoming ever more involved.

Connie Cheng appeared with various co-hosts in all lessons of the "Qingwen" series until late 2013. "Qingwen" focuses on specific aspects of the language that are requested by the user base.

In each ChinesePod lesson, the hosts help to break down the lesson dialog, which is recorded by native Chinese speakers at the company's main studios in Shanghai. Accompanying every lesson is a range of cross-platform review tools, including vocabulary lists, flashcards, comprehension exercises, expansion sentences, grammar notes and interactive character writing practice.

Between the years 2007 and 2009 ChinesePod also offered a special English series called "Ask Amber" hosted by Amber Scorah. The series answered listeners' questions about China and discussed unique aspects of Chinese culture and customs which foreigners may not be aware of. ChinesePod describes Amber as a "pioneer" for developing this new lesson style.

ChinesePod was previously based on a 'freemium' business model similar to English as a Second Language Podcast; in 2011 it became necessary to purchase a package in order to access the lesson material.

Before September 2008, all levels of audio lessons were available for free. They were irrevocably released under a Creative Commons license, so anyone who downloaded them could freely share them, but they are no longer freely downloadable from ChinesePod. The Internet Archive crawled the site at the end of 2007 but did not make the MP3 files available.

ChinesePod was acquired by Bigfoot Ventures in January 2012.

In 2014, Fiona Tian was brought on, initially as a guest host on the Jenny Zhu Podcast, but later coming on full-time to work on upcoming video projects. In early 2015, Jenny, David and the Shanghai Office stopped producing podcasts, and the new team led by Fiona Tian continued producing podcasts from Taipei, Taiwan.

In early 2018, ChinesePod relocated its studios to Hong Kong.
