= James Penton =

Canadian historian and author (1932–2024)

Marvin James Penton
- Born: April 27, 1932; Saskatchewan, Canada
- Died: November 4, 2024 (aged 92)
- Education: University of Arizona (B.A., 1956); University of Iowa (M.A., 1959); University of Iowa (Ph.D., 1965)
- Occupations: Historian, author

Marvin James Penton (April 27, 1932 – November 4, 2024) was a Canadian historian and author. A professor emeritus of history at the University of Lethbridge in Lethbridge, Alberta, he was the author of three books on the history of Jehovah's Witnesses. Although raised in the denomination, he was expelled in 1981 on the grounds of apostasy after criticizing some of the teachings and conduct of the group's leadership. His expulsion gained national media attention.

== Background ==
Born on April 27, 1932 in Saskatchewan, Penton was raised as a fourth-generation Jehovah's Witness, experiencing Canadian government restrictions on the religion's activities when he was a child. He was baptized in June 1948 and was sent by his parents to Arizona due to ill health. Penton attended Amphitheater High School in Tucson, Arizona. He married Marilyn Mae Kling when they were both 19 (circa 1951).

From 1953 to 1956 he attended the University of Arizona, majoring in History and minoring in German and Spanish. He received his Bachelor of Arts degree in 1956. In 1956–1959 he attended the University of Iowa, studying Medieval History and serving as a research and teaching assistant. He received his Master of Arts in European History in 1959. In 1965, he received his Doctor of Philosophy in Latin American History, with a minor in Religious Studies, from the University of Iowa.

Over the years, Penton served in various capacities in Jehovah's Witness congregations in the United States, Puerto Rico and Canada while pursuing an academic career, before moving to Alberta in 1965.

Penton died on November 4, 2024, at the age of 92. A service was held in the St. James Anglican Church of Paris, Ontario.

== Dissent ==
While serving as an elder in the Lethbridge congregation in the late 1970s, Penton developed concerns over the Watch Tower Society’s emphasis on the requirement for Witnesses to engage in public preaching and what he saw as growing harshness and intolerance in the treatment of members of the religion by those in authority.

On August 10, 1979, he sent an eight-page letter to the society detailing his concerns. In part, he wrote, "It is the Society’s misplaced, unscriptural overemphasis on the preaching work which has sickened, is sickening and will continue to sicken the organization until it is placed in its proper perspective. Although it is a necessary aspect of the Christian congregation’s testimony to the world, it is no more important than any other Christian works outlined in the Scriptures ... many are tired to the point of spiritual death itself by the super-pietism and work-righteousness pervading the organization." Penton gave examples of what he considered distortions of New Testament texts to support Watch Tower Society teachings about house-to-house preaching, criticized the appointment of elders chiefly on the basis of field service records, and described circuit overseer visits as "military inspections". He also sought re-emphasis on justification by faith.

The letter, which was distributed among some Witnesses in Lethbridge, prompted accusations from within the organization's hierarchy that Penton was denigrating the preaching work. Pointed talks were given by circuit and district overseers in Lethbridge, warning that anyone who suggested the denomination's Governing Body had made "lots of mistakes" about the issue was lying, "blaspheming the organization", and trying to destroy it. One overseer told an assembly: "Woe betide the man that would speak evil against the representatives of God. He may become like Miriam and stricken with leprosy and he might lose his life." Another overseer said those who suggested the Governing Body were wrong were "unrighteous people" who would die at God's judgment day. Author James Beverley observed, "It is not often that preachers use the threat of leprosy to keep the flock in line." He said most informed Witnesses in Lethbridge would have guessed that the comments were directed chiefly against Penton. Penton resigned as an elder in December 1979, but a day later withdrew the resignation. He received a one-page reply to his letter from the society's headquarters in January 1980 that urged him to adjust his viewpoint or remain silent.

Penton described his treatment by the group as a witch hunt for expressing his view about a denomination that he had once hailed as a "champion of free speech". Penton was expelled and shunned on the grounds of apostasy in February 1981. In the aftermath, 80 other Witnesses–about a quarter of the local membership–severed ties with, or were expelled by, the group.

The events surrounding Penton's expulsion gained widespread media attention including national television coverage, and were the subject of a 1986 book, Crisis of Allegiance, by James A. Beverley, an assistant professor at Atlantic Baptist College in Moncton, New Brunswick, Canada.

== Books ==
=== Jehovah’s Witnesses in Canada: Champions of Freedom of Speech and Worship ===
While a member, Penton wrote Jehovah’s Witnesses in Canada: Champions of Freedom of Speech and Worship (1976), a history of the denomination's struggle for religious freedom under Canadian law, in which he said that many of the political and theological attacks on the Watch Tower Society had been grossly unfair. He subsequently appeared on a Canadian current affairs program to defend the group's doctrines, and denying its leaders were guilty of false prophecy. The book was briefly mentioned in The Watchtower (quoting a Toronto Star review) and three years later in a Yearbook article about the Witnesses' history in Canada, although Penton later wrote that he found it curious that the society refused to quote directly from it or otherwise mention it in publications or conventions. "As a result," he wrote, "some Witnesses manifested direct hostility towards it. On occasions I was openly criticized by particularly narrow Witnesses with 'trying to make money on the brothers' or 'trying to make a big fellow out of myself'."

=== Apocalypse Delayed: The Story of Jehovah's Witnesses ===
Penton began work on Apocalypse Delayed: The Story of Jehovah's Witnesses soon afterwards, but halted the project in 1979 after developing concerns over what he viewed as a growing punitive response of the group's leadership to doctrinal dissent from within its ranks. He resumed work on the book after his expulsion, and it was published in 1985.

=== Jehovah's Witnesses and the Third Reich: Sectarian Politics under Persecution ===
In 2004 he published Jehovah's Witnesses and the Third Reich: Sectarian Politics under Persecution, which provides what he considered discrepancies between the group's official history of its opposition to Nazism during World War II and other documented facts (see Persecution of Jehovah's Witnesses in Nazi Germany). Penton stated that the Watch Tower Society attempted to rewrite its previous history under the Nazi government by concealing early overtures to Adolf Hitler and sidelining the group's antisemitism. The failure of those efforts and persecution by the government, Penton states, resulted in Witnesses in 1933 going back to their earlier position of opposing the Nazis.

Historian Detlef Garbe, director at the Neuengamme (Hamburg) Memorial, criticized Penton's "new theory" that in the 1930s the Watch Tower Society had "adapted" to National Socialism's anti-semitic aggression. Garbe suggested Penton's interpretation reflected a "deep-seated aversion" against his former religious affiliation and that "from a historiographic viewpoint Penton's writings perhaps show a lack of scientific objectivity".

Scholar Kevin P. Spicer states that Penton considers statements by leader Joseph Rutherford and the Witnesses as important toward understanding their attempts at dealing with the Nazi government (early 1930s) by distancing the group from Jews and altering their pro-Jewish position. Spicer said the book is over reliant on published collections and secondary sources and has an absence of sources from the German archive. However, Spicer also states that without downplaying the resistance to Nazism by the Witnesses, "Penton has alerted the reader to the reality that the Jehovah's Witnesses, like most Christians, embraced some form of nationalism and anti-Semitism, especially in the early years of Hitler's reign." Historian Leon Stein said that Garbe's work on Jehovah’s Witnesses in the Third Reich was wide ranging, but described Penton's work as more critical on the topic.

R. Singelenberg wrote, "to conclude from this and scattered anecdotal evidence, as Penton does, that both Rutherford and his following were anti-semitic, while virtually ignoring socio-historical context is demagogical rather than the result of solid analysis [...] the author commits the same fallacy as the object of his dislike which tends to view writers who express too much criticism as apostates of opponents. If Penton would have been able to transform his seemingly personal vendetta into a detached analysis, this study would have rendered considerable surplus value. As it is now, the WBTS will undoubtedly see the book as a reconfirmation of apostate disgression, while the scientific community will frown upon the author's lack of objectivity".

=== Other works ===
Penton also edited two journals, wrote five articles about Jehovah's Witnesses, and also wrote the Canadian Encyclopedia's entry about the denomination.

== Published works ==
- (1976) Jehovah’s Witnesses in Canada: Champions of Freedom of Speech and Worship. (Macmillan, Toronto). ISBN 0-7705-1340-9.
- Penton, M. James (February 20, 2015) [1985]. Apocalypse Delayed: The Story of Jehovah's Witnesses, Third Edition (3rd ed.). University of Toronto Press. ISBN 978-1-4426-1605-9.
- (2004) Jehovah's Witnesses and the Third Reich: Sectarian Politics under Persecution. (University of Toronto Press, Toronto). ISBN 0-8020-8678-0.

== See also ==
- Bibliography of works on Jehovah's Witnesses
- George Chryssides
- Zoe Knox

== Sources ==
- Beverley, James A. (1986). Crisis of Allegiance. Burlington, Ontario: Welch Publishing Company. ISBN 0-920413-37-4. OCLC 17228956. OL 19327397M.
- Chryssides, George D. (2011). Historical Dictionary of New Religious Movements. Scarecrow Press. ISBN 9780810879676.
- Edwards, Linda (2001). A Brief Guide to Beliefs. Louisville, Kentucky: Westminster John Knox Press. p. 440. ISBN 0-664-22259-5.
- Garbe, Detlef; et al. (United States Holocaust Memorial Museum) (2008). Between Resistance and Martyrdom: See Preface for English edition pg. xix, xx. Translated by Grimm, Dagmar G. Univ of Wisconsin Press. ISBN 9780299207908.
- Melton, J. Gordon (April 19, 2023). "Jehovah's Witness". Encyclopedia Britannica.
- Penton, James M. (1997). Apocalypse Delayed: The Story of Jehovah's Witnesses (2nd ed.). University of Toronto Press. ISBN 0-8020-7973-3.
- Penton, M. James (2012). "Jehovah's Witnesses". Canadian Encyclopedia. Archived from the original on October 17, 2013.
- Singelenberg, R. (2005). "Review of Jehovah's Witnesses and The Third Reich. Sectarian Politics under Persecution, by M. J. Penton". Journal of Church and State. 47 (3): 626–627. doi:10.1093/jcs/47.3.626. JSTOR 23920614.
- Spicer, Kevin P. (2006). "Reviewed Work(s): Jehovah's Witnesses and the Third Reich: Sectarian Politics under Persecution by M. James Penton". Church History. 75 (1): 205.
- Spicer, Kevin P. (2009). ""Between Resistance and Martyrdom: Jehovah's Witnesses in the Third Reich. By Detlef Garbe. Translated by Dagmar G. Grimm. Madison: University of Wisconsin Press. 2008. Pp. 856. Cloth $95.00. ISBN 0-299-20790-0. Paper $39.95. ISBN 0-299-20794-3."". Central European History. 42 (3): 578. doi:10.1017/S0008938909990604. S2CID 144992448.
- Stein, Leon (2009). "Between Resistance and Martyrdom: Jehovah's Witnesses in the Third Reich, Detlef Garbe (Madison: The University of Wisconsin Press in association with the United States Holocaust Memorial Museum, 2008), xxxvii+ 856 pp., cloth 95.00, pbk. 39.95" (PDF). Holocaust and Genocide Studies. 23 (3): 492. doi:10.1093/hgs/dcp049.
