= Jehovah's Witnesses and the United Nations =

Doctrine of Jehovah's Witnesses

Jehovah's Witnesses teach that the League of Nations and the United Nations were set up as a counterfeit of God's Kingdom. Joseph F. Rutherford, second president of the Watch Tower Society, condemned politicians, business leaders and clergy in their support of the League of Nations. Jehovah's Witnesses believe that the United Nations will soon destroy all other religions, and then turn against Jehovah's Witnesses. Jehovah's Witness representatives have sought the services of UN bodies such as the United Nations Department of Public Information and the United Nations Human Rights Committee.

== History of teaching ==
=== Development ===
At a convention of Bible Students held in September 1919, the local press reported J. F. Rutherford's comments on the League of Nations: "He declared a League of Nations formed by the political and economic forces, moved by a desire to better mankind by establishment of peace and plenty would accomplish great good, and then asserted that the Lord's displeasure is certain to be visited upon the League, because the clergy--Catholic and Protestant--have abandoned his plan and endorsed the League of Nations, hailing it as the political expression of Christ's kingdom on earth." Rutherford's view was similarly held by other pre-millennialist expositors of that era.

The Bible Student magazine Golden Age referred to the "professional politician" and the "financial powers" and the "clergy" as an "unholy trinity" in support of the League of Nations and predicted its demise: "Since these two classes [politicians and financial] are presumed to be worldly men who never claimed to have made a covenant with God, he might not interfere with them for a time, but chiefly because of the other member of the unholy trinity—the clergy—God indicates that he will not permit the League of Nations and league of churches to endure." In 1930, Rutherford published the booklet Prohibition and the League of Nations—Born of God or the Devil, Which? The Bible Proof which concluded: "Here is the positive and unqualified statement from Jehovah God that neither the League of Nations nor any other combination of men and governments shall have anything to do with the setting up of his kingdom and establishing peace and righteousness. It is God’s kingdom, and not man’s; and for men to assume to do what God has declared he will do is a gross, presumptuous sin. The nation organization that attempts to run ahead of God and presumptuously attempts to set up a rule or organization and call it God’s kingdom will suffer severe punishment."

In a speech given on 20 September 1942, Nathan Knorr, the Society's third president, claimed the newly formed United Nations was the scarlet-colored wild beast of Revelation that would be ridden by the woman "Babylon", which Knorr identified as "the religious organization with headquarters at Vatican City".

=== 1963 resolution ===
In 1963, Jehovah's Witnesses adopted a resolution establishing the official view of the United Nations. The resolution was published in the November 15, 1963, issue of Watchtower. At 24 assemblies held throughout the year, a total of 454,977 convention attendees adopted the resolution.

Regarding the United Nations, paragraph 5 of that resolution states, "the nations further refused the surrender of their sovereignty to God's Messianic kingdom by setting up ... the United Nations, ... This international organization stands for world sovereignty by political men. For years men without faith in God's kingdom have endeavored to get all people to worship this international image of human political sovereignty as the best hope for earthly peace and security, in fact, the last hope for humanity. To date 111 nations have given worship to this political image by becoming members of it. However, we, as witnesses of the Sovereign God Jehovah, will continue refusing to engage in such idolatrous worship."

== Current teaching ==
The flag of the United Nations

Jehovah's Witnesses teach that the United Nations is the "image of the wild beast" referred to in Revelation 13:1–18 and the fulfillment of the "disgusting thing that causes desolation" from Matthew 24:15. Jehovah's Witnesses believe that God will use political forces including the United Nations to destroy "false religion", wherein all institutionalized religions except Jehovah's Witnesses will be destroyed, which they refer to as the beginning of the great tribulation. They further believe that after all other religions are destroyed, "a coalition of nations" will then turn against Jehovah's Witnesses to destroy them, but Jehovah will intervene and destroy all political elements. They believe this act of divine intervention marks the beginning of Armageddon.

In practice, Jehovah's Witnesses "view the United Nations organization as they do other governmental bodies of the world," as "superior authorities" that "exist by God's permission," based on their interpretation of Romans 13:1–2. They believe "this Scriptural position does not condone any form of disrespect toward governments or their officials," to which they are to "render due respect," and they "obey them as long as such obedience does not require that they sin against God."

== Jehovah's Witnesses' interactions with the United Nations ==
In February 1992, Jehovah's Witnesses' New York corporation, the Watchtower Society, was granted association as a non-governmental organisation (NGO) of the United Nations Department of Public Information (UN/DPI). The Watchtower Society requested termination of the association in October 2001, and the DPI disassociated the NGO on 9 October after the matter was reported in The Guardian. A UN/DPI letter dated March 4, 2004, states, "The principal purpose of association of non-governmental organizations with the United Nations Department of Public Information is the redissemination of information in order to increase public understanding of the principles, activities and achievements of the United Nations and its Agencies." The letter explained that "[b]y accepting association with DPI, the organization agreed to meet criteria for association, including support and respect of the principles of the Charter of the United Nations and commitment and means to conduct effective information programmes with its constituents and to a broader audience about UN activities." The official site further notes that association with the UN/DPI "does not constitute their incorporation into the United Nations system, nor does it entitle associated organizations or their staff to any kind of privileges, immunities or special status."

Jehovah's Witnesses have appealed to the United Nations Human Rights Committee about sanctions against their members' activities. Between April 2013 and early April 2016, Jehovah's Witnesses submitted 48 appeals to the United Nations Human Rights Committee, complaining that punishments for sharing faith violate the International Covenant on Civil and Political Rights.
