= Zoe Knox =

American academic (born 1975)

- Born: 1975 (age 50–51)

Academic work
- Discipline: history
- Sub-discipline: religious history Russian history
- Institutions: University of Leicester
- Notable works: Jehovah's Witnesses and the Secular World

Zoe Katrina Knox (born 1975) is an American academic known for her work on religious history. She is an associate professor of Russian history at the University of Leicester.

== Jehovah's Witnesses ==
In 2018, she wrote Jehovah's Witnesses and the Secular World. Her book was reviewed in The Journal of Religion, which stated that it was needed scholarship regarding the history of the denomination. In particular, Knox outlined the group's legal history outside of the United States. She became interested in the subject after researching the history of the Russian Orthodox Church during the Soviet era and noticing the similarities in the challenges faced by both religious groups.

== Books ==
- Knox, Zoe (2005). Russian Society and the Orthodox Church: Religion in Russia after Communism. London: Routledge. ISBN 9780415320535.
- Knox, Zoe (2018). Jehovah's Witnesses and the Secular World: From the 1870s to the Present. London: Palgrave Macmillan. ISBN 978-1-137-39604-4.
- Knox, Zoe; deGraffenried, Julie, eds. (2019). Voices of the Voiceless: Religion, Communism, and the Keston Archive. Waco, Texas: Baylor University Press. ISBN 9781481311236.
- Knox, Zoe; Baran, Emily B., eds. (2025-09-04). Minority Religions and Religious Tolerance: The Jehovah's Witness Test. Bloomsbury Publishing. ISBN 9781350372245.

== See also ==
- Bibliography of Jehovah's Witnesses
- George Chryssides
- James Penton
