= Jehovah's Witnesses membership statistics =

Jehovah's Witnesses have an active presence in most countries. These are the most recent statistics by continent, based on active members, or "publishers" as reported by the Watch Tower Society. The Watch Tower Society provides 'average' and 'peak' figures for the number of active members. The 'peak' figure refers to the highest number of reports for any month, including late reports from the previous month; this results in some members being counted twice for the 'peak' figure.

Bible study figures indicate the average number of Bible studies conducted each month by Jehovah's Witness members with non-members. This includes studies conducted by Jehovah's Witness parents with their unbaptized children, which can be counted as one Bible study per month, per child.

The Watch Tower Society reports its activity in various dependencies and constituent states as separate 'lands', as noted.

== Africa ==
Country	Population	Peak	Publishers	Increase (%)	Baptized	Ratio (Note: The number of people in the general population per publisher.)	Cong.	Bible studies	Memorial attendance
Angola	39,040,000	189,454	184,807	6	12,200	211	2,614	496,114	658,991
Benin	14,192,000	16,233	15,800	6	939	898	298	31,302	47,507
Botswana	2,360,000	2,543	2,457	4	154	961	45	3,570	6,329
Burkina Faso	24,075,000	2,120	1,993	4	81	12,080	57	2,433	4,675
Burundi	13,605,000	21,849	20,666	10	1,699	658	424	43,888	81,345
Cameroon	29,879,000	46,572	45,885	4	1,966	651	649	59,493	105,715
Cape Verde	514,000	2,277	2,257	1	86	228	35	3,176	7,095
Central African Republic	5,513,000	3,705	3,527	11	334	1,563	72	9,875	25,256
Chad	19,341,000	1,082	1,034	11	74	18,705	26	1,201	4,229
Congo (Democratic Republic)	115,685,000	306,303	297,215	11	23,170	389	4,810	788,698	1,411,774
Congo (Republic)	6,565,000	10,811	10,344	8	613	635	135	26,097	33,669
Côte d'Ivoire	32,712,000	14,068	13,545	6	759	2,415	232	22,612	52,597
Equatorial Guinea	1,669,000	3,132	2,936	11	277	568	36	7,542	8,501
Eswatini	1,256,000	3,519	3,431	4	166	366	74	4,969	8,902
Ethiopia	133,271,000	12,853	12,493	6	723	10,668	209	8,872	27,152
Gabon	2,420,000	5,033	4,862	5	198	498	64	7,751	10,917
Gambia	2,822,000	358	346	10	9	8,156	6	474	761
Ghana	33,742,000	163,141	160,365	3	7,639	210	2,634	328,119	387,382
Guinea	15,100,000	1,389	1,339	7	86	11,277	31	2,700	4,917
Guinea-Bissau	2,250,000	216	209	1	17	10,766	4	478	677
Kenya	53,331,000	35,011	33,704	7	1,852	1,582	600	48,056	80,719
Lesotho	2,363,000	4,594	4,404	7	281	537	83	6,086	11,900
Liberia	5,731,000	9,225	8,693	9	661	659	159	24,984	41,561
Madagascar	32,741,000	45,673	44,597	7	3,014	734	865	85,204	176,453
Madeira (Note: Portuguese autonomous region)	259,000	1,208	1,199	1	13	216	19	429	1,904
Malawi	22,216,000	127,154	115,535	9	8,439	192	2,058	159,387	370,884
Mali	25,199,000	366	341	-6	7	73,897	6	391	861
Mauritius	1,200,000	2,163	2,131	0	61	563	28	1,522	4,841
Mayotte (Note: Overseas department of France)	329,000	131	122	-15	8	2,697	2	164	303
Mozambique	35,632,000	109,531	103,244	12	10,368	345	2,072	177,808	405,172
Namibia	3,093,000	3,083	2,961	6	181	1,045	54	4,490	9,736
Niger	27,918,000	385	340	6	10	82,112	9	442	976
Nigeria	237,528,000	421,375	403,535	3	27,263	589	6,221	766,292	818,848
Réunion	896,000	3,639	3,571	1	65	251	41	1,474	6,691
Rodrigues (Note: Constituency of Mauritius)	44,000	74	66	0	0	667	1	63	169
Rwanda	14,105,000	39,063	37,098	8	2,563	380	650	65,996	100,654
Saint Helena (Note: British overseas territory)	4,000	133	123	9	1	33	3	53	299
São Tomé and Príncipe	210,000	842	825	-2	53	255	17	2,600	3,121
Senegal	19,391,000	1,642	1,586	1	49	12,226	27	1,707	3,104
Seychelles	122,000	417	368	7	15	332	5	318	1,019
Sierra Leone	8,820,000	2,803	2,662	9	170	3,313	44	5,357	9,205
South Africa	63,101,000	107,746	105,117	4	4,646	600	1,925	105,918	260,378
South Sudan	15,787,000	2,469	2,408	14	221	6,556	37	5,252	7,992
Sudan	51,662,000	71	67	-52	19	771,075	3	96	160
Tanzania	68,153,000	23,789	23,031	9	1,451	2,959	423	43,228	69,184
Togo	8,624,000	25,668	25,075	5	1,337	344	408	52,729	65,935
Uganda	45,905,000	11,004	10,615	7	749	4,325	201	23,657	34,351
Zambia	21,177,000	284,792	253,206	11	20,634	84	3,908	450,940	1,046,891
Zimbabwe	15,923,000	55,516	53,749	7	3,037	296	997	95,867	128,486

== North America ==
Country	Population	Peak	Publishers	Increase (%)	Baptized	Ratio	Cong.	Bible studies	Memorial attendance
Azores (Note: The western islands of the Azores are located on the North American Plate in the Atlantic Ocean; the remaining islands are located on the Azores microplate independent of Europe and Africa. F.O. Marques, J.C. Catalão, C.DeMets, A.C.G. Costa, A. Hildenbrand (2013). "GPS and tectonic evidence for a diffuse plate boundary at the Azores Triple Junction" (PDF). Earth and Planetary Science Letters. 381: 177–187. doi:10.1016/j.epsl.2013.08.051. "A comparison of the GPS velocities of Pico, Faial, S. Jorge and Terceira islands with the Nubia–Eurasia velocity in the Azores region (ca. 4.5 mm/yr, DeMets et al., 2010) shows that the islands belong to neither the Eurasia nor Nubia plates.")	242,000	828	817	2	16	296	15	541	1,609
Belize	418,000	2,532	2,485	1	62	168	51	1,953	7,113
Bermuda	65,000	417	399	2	11	163	5	164	822
Canada	41,549,000	125,116	124,359	2	1,975	334	1,161	40,091	198,010
Costa Rica	5,153,000	32,604	32,381	1	755	159	417	17,791	67,637
El Salvador	6,030,000	37,406	37,174	0	799	162	580	19,835	78,208
Greenland (Note: Danish autonomous territory)	57,000	139	135	9	0	422	5	74	252
Guatemala	18,080,000	39,427	39,219	1	1,108	461	780	27,036	92,075
Honduras	11,006,000	22,007	21,665	1	597	508	405	16,302	54,955
Mexico	131,947,000	887,844	879,024	1	24,896	150	12,215	579,848	2,129,826
Nicaragua	7,008,000	29,071	28,880	1	831	243	440	23,237	78,226
Panama	4,571,000	19,323	19,044	2	632	240	298	15,744	54,411
Saint Pierre and Miquelon (Note: French overseas collectivity)	6,000	30	18	13	0	333	1	12	33
United States	342,270,000	1,256,919	1,249,518	1	23,848	274	11,803	448,305	2,377,763

=== Caribbean ===
Country	Population	Peak	Publishers	Increase (%)	Baptized	Ratio	Cong.	Bible studies	Memorial attendance
Anguilla	16,000	73	67	8	0	239	1	46	237
Antigua	104,000	452	439	-2	20	237	7	257	1,216
Aruba (Note: Constituent country of the Netherlands)	108,000	1,106	1,096	1	26	99	13	609	2,774
Bahamas	403,000	1,696	1,647	0	29	245	28	1,262	4,191
Barbados	283,000	2,372	2,322	0	59	122	30	1,469	5,473
Bonaire (Note: Special municipality of the Netherlands)	27,000	158	153	8	0	176	2	134	461
Cayman Islands	91,000	313	301	2	0	302	3	190	789
Cuba	9,748,000	83,406	82,835	-1	2,258	118	1,283	82,483	196,596
Curaçao	156,000	1,930	1,917	1	35	81	24	1,149	4,942
Dominica	67,000	404	382	-1	7	175	10	441	1,168
Dominican Republic	11,520,000	39,936	38,497	1	1,192	299	532	46,001	114,291
Grenada	117,000	566	512	0	9	229	9	314	1,414
Guadeloupe	380,000	8,625	8,551	2	201	44	112	5,143	18,901
Haiti	11,906,000	16,750	16,511	0	924	721	243	26,964	44,099
Jamaica	2,837,000	10,985	10,809	0	283	262	153	6,562	29,802
Martinique	355,000	4,825	4,763	0	86	75	54	3,053	9,981
Montserrat	4,000	29	27	-10	0	148	1	39	88
Nevis (Note: Federation of Saint Kitts and Nevis)	13,000	94	78	7	0	167	1	63	252
Puerto Rico (Note: US insular area)	3,203,000	22,806	22,703	0	322	141	222	6,914	42,157
Saba	2,000	19	18	13	0	111	1	17	54
Saint Barthélemy	11,000	40	34	-3	0	324	1	21	93
Saint Kitts	38,000	252	239	0	12	159	3	165	664
Saint Lucia	184,000	777	750	-3	9	245	10	513	1,947
Saint Martin	25,000	322	305	3	9	82	5	273	896
Saint Vincent and the Grenadines	100,000	305	297	2	8	337	7	234	894
Sint Eustatius	3,000	32	30	3	0	100	1	21	95
Sint Maarten	44,000	329	312	6	9	141	4	197	937
Trinidad and Tobago	1,368,000	10,576	10,513	1	237	130	127	7,872	24,824
Turks and Caicos	51,000	367	345	5	7	148	6	331	1,018
Virgin Islands (British)	40,000	223	219	1	0	183	4	135	634
Virgin Islands (US)	104,000	535	502	1	9	207	8	309	1,197

== South America ==
Country	Population	Peak	Publishers	Increase (%)	Baptized	Ratio	Cong.	Bible studies	Memorial attendance
Argentina	46,235,000	157,140	156,296	1	3,956	296	1,927	80,485	304,069
Bolivia	12,582,000	30,730	30,492	3	1,253	413	462	31,610	75,854
Brazil	213,421,000	938,337	930,836	2	25,032	229	12,669	504,236	1,793,667
Chile	20,207,000	88,664	88,202	1	1,905	229	1,024	37,753	185,618
Colombia	52,696,000	193,778	192,392	2	5,895	274	2,341	142,088	526,568
Ecuador	18,104,000	104,393	102,951	2	3,575	176	1,190	95,393	270,170
Falkland Islands	4,000	9	7	-30	0	571	1	8	18
French Guiana	292,000	3,045	2,984	1	96	98	43	4,327	10,463
Guyana	836,000	3,322	3,259	1	81	257	43	3,090	11,782
Paraguay	6,417,000	11,699	11,599	3	561	553	179	10,083	23,502
Peru	34,350,000	139,464	138,496	3	5,149	248	1,714	139,315	378,761
Suriname	640,000	3,265	3,180	1	124	201	54	3,049	8,796
Uruguay	3,486,000	12,117	11,966	1	256	291	148	6,353	21,978
Venezuela	28,517,000	139,199	138,492	2	5,310	206	1,726	112,789	398,453

== Asia ==
Country	Population	Peak	Publishers	Increase (%)	Baptized	Ratio	Cong.	Bible studies	Memorial attendance
Armenia	3,076,000	11,779	11,530	1	513	267	125	4,389	25,005
Azerbaijan	10,225,000	1,824	1,786	-3	65	5,725	24	1,446	3,783
Bangladesh	175,687,000	449	422	14	30	416,320	11	564	1,290
Cambodia	17,578,000	1,300	1,267	9	99	13,874	21	1,633	2,660
Cyprus	1,371,000	3,156	3,128	0	66	438	39	1,357	5,712
East Timor	1,415,000	449	399	6	23	3,546	6	481	963
Georgia	3,705,000	19,523	19,439	2	533	191	213	4,441	32,044
Hong Kong (Note: Chinese special administrative region)	7,534,000	5,588	5,541	1	280	1,360	72	4,022	9,217
India	1,463,866,000	60,977	60,304	3	2,702	24,275	1,010	60,162	156,509
Indonesia	284,439,000	32,914	32,371	3	622	8,787	491	26,308	61,754
Israel	10,106,000	2,104	2,080	-1	37	4,859	34	859	3,451
Japan	123,300,000	214,118	213,745	0	2,041	577	2,835	87,071	287,497
Kazakhstan	20,388,000	17,343	17,199	1	436	1,185	217	5,865	28,893
Korea (Republic)	51,169,000	105,726	105,552	0	1,505	485	1,239	33,841	134,522
Kyrgyzstan	7,282,000	5,242	5,190	1	131	1,403	71	2,417	9,569
Macau	688,000	435	425	9	1	1,619	6	477	859
Malaysia	34,200,000	5,740	5,677	0	278	6,024	117	5,181	11,991
Mongolia	3,545,000	469	443	0	42	8,002	8	492	1,120
Myanmar	51,317,000	5,382	5,303	2	253	9,677	115	5,947	10,543
Nepal	29,876,000	3,001	2,957	3	167	10,103	62	4,189	7,756
Pakistan	255,220,000	1,290	1,221	5	63	209,025	16	1,051	4,811
Palestinian territories (Note: Disputed territory comprising West Bank and Gaza Strip under the jurisdiction of the Palestinian National Authority and the Hamas Government in Gaza)	5,745,000	81	80	3	2	71,813	2	54	204
Philippines	113,863,000	273,412	268,287	4	11,098	424	3,832	253,335	646,549
Sri Lanka	21,763,000	7,169	7,059	2	135	3,083	86	6,886	14,806
Taiwan (Note: Disputed territory administered by the Republic of China (Taiwan) and claimed by the People's Republic of China.)	23,396,000	11,924	11,807	2	343	1,982	179	9,099	20,549
Thailand	70,366,000	5,710	5,606	3	186	12,552	148	5,205	10,352
Türkiye	85,665,000	4,615	4,345	-12	197	19,716	59	1,918	7,447

== Europe ==
Country	Population	Peak	Publishers	Increase (%)	Baptized	Ratio	Cong.	Bible studies	Memorial attendance
Albania	2,363,000	5,349	5,320	-1	113	444	77	2,873	9,756
Andorra	88,000	177	168	4	0	524	3	82	359
Austria	9,197,000	22,487	22,421	0	290	410	278	6,640	34,421
Belgium	11,826,000	26,746	26,511	1	541	446	335	9,028	43,203
Bosnia and Herzegovina	3,140,000	951	918	-2	6	3,420	15	177	1,335
Britain (Note: Island incorporating England, Scotland and Wales)	67,698,000	144,116	143,320	0	2,372	472	1,565	42,112	223,423
Bulgaria	6,437,000	3,040	2,991	3	143	2,152	58	1,673	6,371
Croatia	3,874,000	4,595	4,560	-1	114	850	56	785	7,014
Czech Republic	10,877,000	17,496	17,367	2	264	626	218	4,462	30,574
Denmark	6,001,000	14,759	14,675	1	244	409	170	3,672	20,473
Estonia	1,370,000	4,118	4,097	0	45	334	54	1,187	6,468
Faroe Islands	55,000	126	122	-8	2	451	4	54	181
Finland	5,636,000	18,366	18,264	0	184	309	261	6,123	25,716
France	68,668,000	140,797	139,548	1	2,431	492	1,445	40,539	228,785
Germany	83,600,000	176,478	175,685	0	2,860	476	1,954	45,600	270,177
Gibraltar	40,000	169	166	1	0	241	2	31	224
Greece	10,410,000	27,682	27,542	0	433	378	340	6,300	42,145
Hungary	9,540,000	21,586	21,308	0	365	448	278	5,502	37,115
Iceland	391,000	458	445	1	2	879	7	160	749
Ireland (Note: Island incorporating the Republic of Ireland and Northern Ireland)	7,329,000	8,381	8,280	3	138	885	123	2,743	13,823
Italy	58,934,000	252,521	252,003	0	3,812	234	2,696	71,978	405,476
Kosovo (Note: Disputed territory within Serbia)	1,586,000	277	263	10	5	6,030	7	275	489
Latvia	1,857,000	2,104	2,077	0	28	894	29	714	3,188
Liechtenstein	40,000	108	105	3	0	381	1	23	166
Lithuania	2,891,000	2,918	2,887	0	27	1,001	39	796	4,541
Luxembourg	682,000	2,264	2,227	1	9	306	32	803	4,029
Malta	545,000	883	867	3	10	629	10	287	1,508
Moldova	2,381,000	15,513	15,422	-10	407	154	158	5,105	27,432
Monaco	38,000	46	44	0	0	864	1	16	111
Montenegro	624,000	448	434	5	2	1,438	8	114	759
Netherlands	18,069,000	29,552	29,341	0	412	616	333	8,218	48,179
North Macedonia	1,826,000	1,275	1,258	1	40	1,452	22	473	2,310
Norway	5,601,000	12,096	12,020	0	156	466	161	3,058	17,583
Poland	37,412,000	113,987	113,584	-1	1,279	329	1,263	21,471	175,523
Portugal	10,248,000	56,222	55,619	4	1,085	184	652	21,188	99,164
Romania	19,036,000	40,545	40,397	1	774	471	538	15,601	80,592
San Marino	34,000	218	213	4	0	160	2	68	331
Serbia	6,586,000	3,850	3,774	2	73	1,745	59	1,232	6,817
Slovakia	5,422,000	11,267	11,194	0	178	484	139	2,278	20,620
Slovenia	2,131,000	1,735	1,713	-1	13	1,244	22	487	2,624
Spain	49,316,000	127,840	126,954	2	2,146	388	1,377	37,939	211,887
Sweden	10,591,000	22,450	22,284	0	263	475	274	5,855	33,003
Switzerland	9,049,000	20,352	20,261	0	292	447	244	6,249	32,153
Ukraine	38,980,000	99,155	97,928	-3	1,582	398	1,132	22,934	165,739

== Oceania ==
Country	Population	Peak	Publishers	Increase (%)	Baptized	Ratio	Cong.	Bible studies	Memorial attendance
American Samoa	46,000	160	146	7	4	315	3	129	610
Australia	27,640,000	72,095	71,484	0	1,368	387	711	19,614	114,317
Chuuk (Note: Federated States of Micronesia)	50,000	32	28	0	3	1,786	2	59	144
Cook Islands (Note: Self-governing in free association with New Zealand)	17,000	209	190	-2	9	89	3	91	522
Fiji	901,000	3,107	2,946	1	138	306	58	3,653	11,744
Guam	169,000	772	755	4	26	224	9	579	1,760
Kiribati	136,000	186	145	6	6	938	2	290	390
Kosrae	7,000	12	11	22	1	636	1	23	36
Marshall Islands	37,000	154	140	7	8	264	4	258	659
Nauru	12,000	21	15	7	0	800	1	35	150
New Caledonia (Note: Sui generis collectivity of France)	265,000	2,726	2,688	1	115	99	32	2,468	7,606
New Zealand	5,331,000	14,809	14,652	1	239	364	169	5,375	27,066
Niue	2,000	21	19	0	0	105	1	6	47
Palau	18,000	76	70	0	4	257	2	116	194
Papua New Guinea	10,763,000	5,843	5,196	6	483	2,071	164	8,112	40,043
Pohnpei	37,000	60	56	6	0	661	1	69	143
(Northern Mariana Islands) Rota (Note: Commonwealth of the Northern Mariana Islands (US insular area))	2,000	2	2	0	0	1,000	1	0	18
(Northern Mariana Islands) Saipan	43,000	236	228	0	10	189	3	189	520
Samoa	216,000	669	617	11	13	350	12	699	2,483
Solomon Islands	798,000	1,814	1,704	1	76	468	38	1,581	11,406
Tahiti	280,000	3,268	3,211	0	85	87	46	2,478	9,726
(Northern Mariana Islands) Tinian	2,000	11	10	0	0	200	1	9	32
Tonga	104,000	243	225	7	11	462	3	205	575
Tuvalu	10,000	83	64	12	1	156	1	58	215
Vanuatu	345,000	859	714	11	40	483	13	1,125	4,648
Wallis and Futuna	11,000	86	83	8	3	133	2	88	282
Yap	12,000	37	34	10	5	353	1	131	145

== Other ==
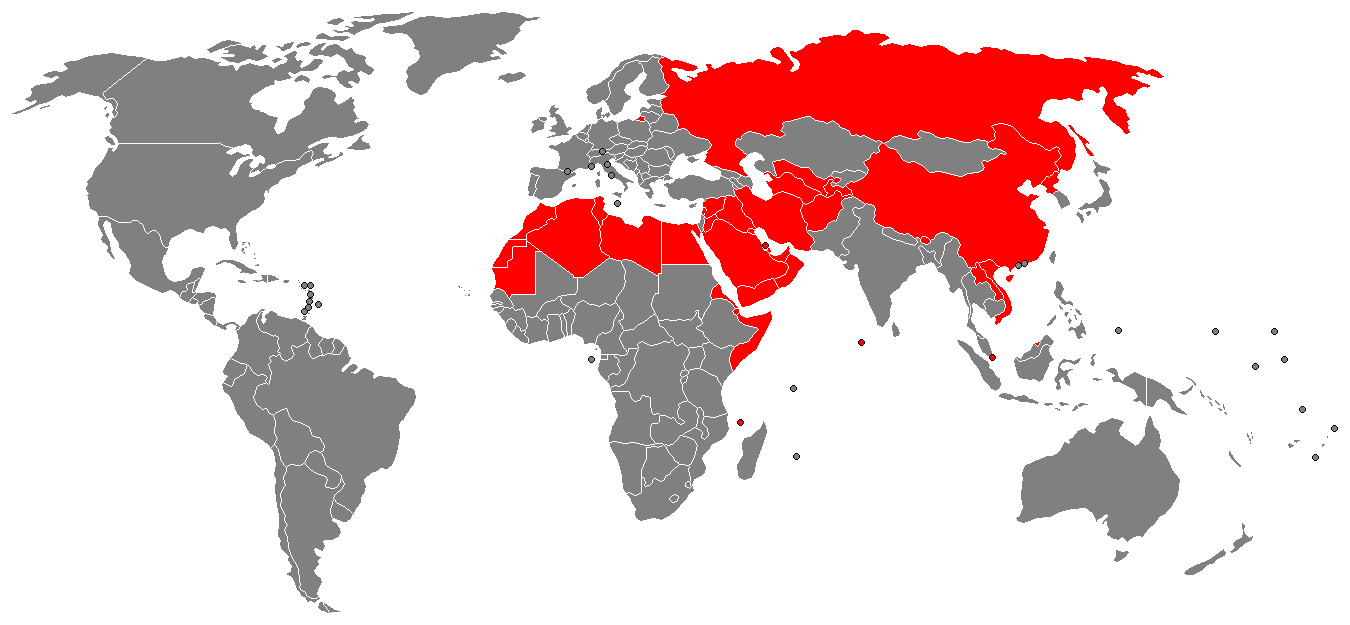
Countries where Jehovah's Witnesses' activities are banned

In addition to the published figures for individual countries, statistics are also published collectively for countries where Jehovah's Witnesses operate covertly under ban, including several Islamic and communist states.

"Other Lands"	Peak	Publishers	Increase (%)	Baptized	Cong.	Bible studies	Memorial attendance
35	225,159	222,582	1.6	4,175	2,965	85,580	340,230

There are 37 sovereign states not specifically listed in the Watch Tower Society's reported statistics:

- Afghanistan
- Algeria
- Bahrain
- Belarus
- Bhutan
- Brunei
- China
- Comoros
- Djibouti
- Egypt
- Eritrea
- Iran
- Iraq
- Jordan
- Kuwait
- Laos
- Lebanon
- Libya
- Maldives
- Mauritania
- Morocco
- North Korea
- Oman
- Qatar
- Russia
- Saudi Arabia
- Singapore
- Somalia
- Syria
- Tajikistan
- Tunisia
- Turkmenistan
- United Arab Emirates
- Uzbekistan
- Vatican City
- Vietnam
- Yemen

== Total ==
"Lands"	Peak	Publishers	Increase (%)	Baptized	Cong.	Bible studies	Memorial attendance	Memorial partakers
243	9,205,326	9,047,083	2.5	304,643	119,652	7,603,182	20,635,015	24,576

== See also ==
- Demographics of Jehovah's Witnesses

== Sources ==
- 2025 Country and Territory Reports, Watch Tower Bible & Tract Society of Pennsylvania.
