= Jehovah's Witnesses =

Restorationist Christian denomination

- The logo of the denomination's official website
- Classification: Restorationist
- Orientation: Premillennialist
- Scripture: Bible (Protestant canon)
- Theology: Nontrinitarian
- Governance: Governing Body
- Structure: Hierarchical
- Region: Worldwide
- Headquarters: Warwick, New York, US
- Founder: Charles Taze Russell (Bible Student movement); Joseph Franklin Rutherford
- Origin: 1870s Pittsburgh, Pennsylvania, US
- Branched from: Bible Student movement, Adventism
- Separations: Jehovah's Witnesses splinter groups
- Congregations: 119,500 (2025)
- Members: 9 million (2025)
- Missionaries: 4,091 (2021)
- Publications: Jehovah's Witnesses publications
- Official website: jw.org/en/

Jehovah's Witnesses is a nontrinitarian, millenarian, and restorationist Christian denomination, stemming from the Bible Student movement founded by Charles Taze Russell in the nineteenth century. Russell co-founded Zion's Watch Tower Tract Society in 1881 to organize and print the movement's publications. A leadership dispute after Russell's death led several groups to break away, with Joseph Franklin Rutherford retaining control of the Watch Tower Society and its properties. Rutherford made organizational and doctrinal changes; in 1931 he adopted the name Jehovah's witnesses (Note: Prior to the April 1, 1975, issue of The Watchtower, "witnesses" was consistently uncapitalized in Watch Tower Society literature (with the exception of title-cased headings) when referring to the denomination.) to distinguish the group from other Bible Student groups and symbolize a break with Russell's traditions. In 2025, Jehovah's Witnesses reported worldwide membership of about 9.2 million.

Jehovah's Witnesses are known for their evangelism, distributing literature such as The Watchtower and Awake!, and for refusing military service and blood transfusions. They consider the use of God's name vital for proper worship. They reject Trinitarianism, inherent immortality of the soul, and hell, which they consider unscriptural doctrines. Jehovah's Witnesses believe that the destruction of the present world system at Armageddon is imminent, and the establishment of God's kingdom over earth is the only solution to all of humanity's problems. They do not observe Christmas, Easter, birthdays, or other holidays and customs they consider to have pagan origins incompatible with Christianity. They prefer to use their own Bible translation, the New World Translation of the Holy Scriptures.

Jehovah's Witnesses consider human society morally corrupt and under the influence of Satan, and most limit their social interaction with non-Witnesses. The denomination is directed by a group known as the Governing Body of Jehovah's Witnesses, which establishes all doctrines. Congregational disciplinary actions include formal expulsion and shunning, for what they consider serious offenses. Members who formally leave are considered to be "disassociated" and are also shunned. Some members who leave voluntarily successfully "fade" without being shunned. Former members may experience significant mental distress as a result of being shunned, and some seek reinstatement to maintain contact with their friends and family.

The group's position on conscientious objection to military service and refusal to salute state symbols—for example, national anthems and flags—has brought it into conflict with several governments. Jehovah's Witnesses have been persecuted, with their activities banned or restricted in some countries. Persistent legal challenges by Jehovah's Witnesses have influenced legislation related to civil rights in several countries. The organization has been criticized regarding biblical translation, doctrines, and alleged coercion of its members. The Watch Tower Society has made unfulfilled predictions about major biblical events, such as Jesus' Second Coming, the advent of God's kingdom, and Armageddon. Their policies for handling cases of child sexual abuse have been the subject of various formal inquiries.

== Demographics ==
Jehovah's Witnesses have an active presence in most countries. In 2025, Jehovah's Witnesses reported approximately 9 million publishers—the term they use for members actively involved in preaching—in about 119,500 congregations. In the same year, they conducted Bible studies with 7,603,182 individuals (including those conducted by Witness parents with their children). 4,091 members served as missionaries in 2021. In 2025, Jehovah's Witnesses reported a worldwide annual increase of 2.5%. 20,635,015 people attended the annual memorial of Christ's death. The official published membership statistics, such as those above, include only those who submit reports for their personal ministry. As a result, only about half of those who self-identify as Jehovah's Witnesses in independent demographic studies are considered active by the faith itself. Research regarding the demographics of Jehovah's Witnesses is incredibly limited; sample sizes tend to be small and focused to a specific region. Cross-cultural studies are "virtually non-existent".

The 2008 US Pew Forum on Religion & Public Life survey found a low retention rate among members of the denomination: about 37% of people raised in the group continued to identify as Jehovah's Witnesses. The next lowest retention rates were for Buddhism at 50% and Catholicism at 68%. The study also found that 65% of adult American Jehovah's Witnesses are converts. In 2016, Jehovah's Witnesses had the lowest average household income among surveyed religious groups, with approximately half of Witness households in the United States earning less than $30,000 per year. As of 2016, Jehovah's Witnesses were considered to be the most racially diverse Christian denomination in the United States. A sociological comparative study by the Pew Research Center found that American Jehovah's Witnesses ranked highest in belief in God, importance of religion in one's life, frequency of religious attendance, frequency of prayers, frequency of Bible reading outside of religious services, belief that their prayers are answered, belief that their religion can only be interpreted one way, belief that theirs is the only one true faith leading to eternal life, opposition to abortion, and opposition to homosexuality. Jehovah's Witnesses also ranked lowest in interest in politics.

== History ==
Scholarly analysis of Jehovah's Witnesses is limited in academia, with most works focusing on legal challenges faced by the group. The denomination does not cooperate with scholars beyond limited communication from anonymous individuals. Consequently, academics often rely on literature written by former members such as James Penton and Raymond Franz to understand its inner workings. The denomination has been variously described as a church, sect, new religious movement, or cult. Usage of the various terms has been debated among sociologists. When the term sect is used by sociologists, it is within the framework of church-sect typology for their activities within a specific country. Sociologists from the 1940s to the 1960s frequently compared the group's structure with totalitarianism. Throughout the 1970s and 80s, sociologists determined that cult was a reductionist label when applied to Jehovah's Witnesses, noting that new members did not undergo "sudden transformations" and made a rational choice to join the group. Academics generally stopped using the term cult in the 1980s due to its pejorative association and its usage by the Christian countercult movement, with new religious movement largely replacing it. Scholars George Chryssides and Zoe Knox avoid using the term new religious movement because it also has negative connotations. Chryssides refers to the denomination as an "old new religion".

=== Background ===
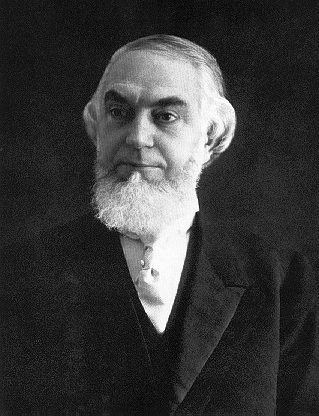
Charles Taze Russell, founder of the Watch Tower Society

In 1870, Charles Taze Russell and others formed a group in Pittsburgh, Pennsylvania, to study the Bible. During his ministry, Russell disputed many of mainstream Christianity's tenets, including immortality of the soul, hellfire, predestination, Christ's return, the Trinity, and the burning up of the world. In 1876, he met Nelson H. Barbour. Later that year they jointly produced the book Three Worlds, which combined restitutionist views with end time prophecy.

The book taught that God's dealings with humanity were divided dispensationally, with each period ending with a "harvest", and that Jesus inaugurated the "harvest of the Gospel age" by means of his invisible return in 1874. The book asserted that 1914 would mark the end of a 2,520-year period called "the Gentile Times", at which time world society would be replaced by the full establishment of God's kingdom on earth. Beginning in 1878, Russell and Barbour jointly edited a religious magazine, Herald of the Morning. In June 1879, the two split over doctrinal differences, and in July, Russell began publishing the magazine Zion's Watch Tower and Herald of Christ's Presence, saying its purpose was to demonstrate that the world was in "the last days" and that a new age of earthly and human restitution under Jesus' reign was imminent.

From 1879, Watch Tower supporters gathered as autonomous congregations to study the Bible topically. Thirty congregations were founded, and during 1879 and 1880, Russell visited each to provide the format he recommended for conducting meetings. In 1881, Zion's Watch Tower Tract Society was presided over by William Henry Conley, and in 1884, Russell incorporated the society as a nonprofit business to distribute tracts and Bibles. He also published a six book series entitled Studies in the Scriptures. By about 1900, Russell had organized thousands of part- and full-time colporteurs, and was appointing foreign missionaries and establishing branch offices. By the 1910s, Russell's organization maintained nearly a hundred "pilgrims", or traveling preachers. Russell engaged in significant global publishing efforts during his ministry, and by 1912, he was the most distributed Christian author in the United States. He also directed The Photo-Drama of Creation, an eight-hour audiovisual presentation featuring biblical accounts.

Russell moved the Watch Tower Society's headquarters to Brooklyn, New York City, in 1909, combining printing and corporate offices with a house of worship; volunteers were housed in a nearby residence he named Bethel. He identified the religious movement as "Bible Students", and more formally as the International Bible Students Association. By 1910, about 50,000 people worldwide were associated with the movement and congregations reelected him annually as their pastor. Russell died on October 31, 1916, at the age of 64 while returning from a ministerial speaking tour.

=== Joseph Rutherford ===
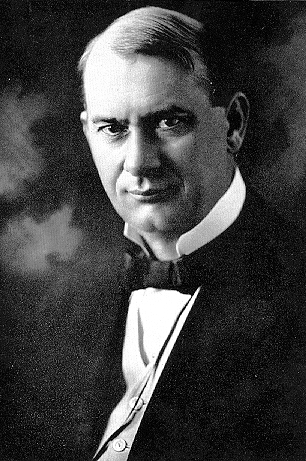
Joseph Rutherford in 1910

In January 1917, the Watch Tower Society's legal representative, Joseph Franklin Rutherford, was elected as its next president. His election was disputed, and members of the Board of Directors accused him of acting in an autocratic and secretive manner. The divisions between his supporters and opponents triggered a major turnover of members over the next decade. Because of disappointment over the changes and unfulfilled predictions, tens of thousands of defections occurred during the first half of Rutherford's tenure, leading to the formation of several Bible Student organizations independent of the Watch Tower Society, the largest of which was the Dawn Bible Students Association. There are varying estimates of how many Bible Students left during Rutherford's tenure, with Alan Rogerson believing the total number to be unclear. By mid-1919, an estimated one in seven of Russell-era Bible Students had ceased their association with the Society. Between 1921 and 1931 three-quarters were estimated to have left.

Rutherford enacted several changes under his leadership, many of which are considered "distinctive" to modern Jehovah's Witness beliefs and practices. Some of these changes include advocating for door-to-door preaching, prohibiting celebrations believed to be pagan such as Christmas, the belief that Jesus died on a stake instead of a cross, and a more uniform organizational hierarchy. In 1919, Rutherford instituted the appointment of a director in each congregation, and a year later all members were instructed to report their weekly preaching activity to the Brooklyn headquarters. In 1920, he announced that the Hebrew patriarchs (such as Abraham and Isaac) would be resurrected in 1925, marking the beginning of Christ's thousand-year earthly kingdom. In July 1917, he released The Finished Mystery as a seventh volume to the Studies in the Scriptures series. Rutherford claimed it to be Russell's posthumous work, but it was actually written by Clayton Woodworth, George Fisher, and Gertrude Seibert. It strongly criticized Catholic and Protestant clergy and Christian involvement in the Great War. As a result, Watch Tower Society directors were jailed for sedition under the Espionage Act in 1918 and members were subjected to mob violence; the directors were released in March 1919 and charges against them were dropped in 1920.

On July 26, 1931, at a convention in Columbus, Ohio, Rutherford introduced the new name Jehovah's witnesses, based on Isaiah 43:10: "Ye are my witnesses, saith the Lord, and my servant whom I have chosen: that ye may know and believe me, and understand that I am he: before me there was no God formed, neither shall there be after me" (King James Version). It was adopted by resolution. The name was chosen to distinguish his group of Bible Students from other independent groups that had severed ties with the Society, as well as to symbolize the instigation of new outlooks and the promotion of fresh evangelizing methods.

In 1932, Rutherford eliminated the system of locally elected elders. In 1938, he introduced what he called a theocratic organizational system, under which appointments in congregations worldwide were made from the Brooklyn headquarters. Doctrine regarding life after death also evolved under his tenure. In addition to the preexisting belief that there would be 144,000 people to survive Armageddon and live in heaven to rule over earth with Jesus, a separate class of members, the "great multitude", was introduced. This group would live in a paradise restored on earth; from 1935, new converts to the movement were considered part of that class. By the mid-1930s, the timing of the beginning of Jesus' presence, his enthronement as king, and the start of the last days were each moved to 1914. As their interpretations of the Bible evolved, Witness publications decreed that saluting national flags was a form of idolatry, which led to a new outbreak of mob violence and government opposition in various countries.

=== Nathan Knorr ===
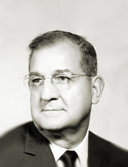
Nathan Knorr, the third president of the Watch Tower Bible and Tract Society

Nathan Knorr was appointed as third president of the Watch Tower Bible and Tract Society in 1942. Knorr organized large international assemblies, instituted new training programs for members, and expanded missionary activity and branch offices worldwide. He also increased the use of explicit instructions guiding Jehovah's Witnesses' lifestyle and conduct as well as a greater use of congregational judicial procedures to enforce a strict moral code. Watch Tower Society literature stopped crediting individual contributors during his tenure, as he believed that recognition should only be given to God.

Knorr commissioned a new translation of the Bible, the New World Translation of the Holy Scriptures, the full version of which was released in 1961. Various Bible scholars, including Bruce M. Metzger and MacLean Gilmour, have said that while scholarship is evident in New World Translation, its rendering of certain texts is inaccurate and biased in favor of Witness practices and doctrines. Critics of the group such as Edmund C. Gruss and Christian writers such as Ray C. Stedman, Walter Martin, Norman Klann, and Anthony Hoekema say the New World Translation is scholastically dishonest. Most criticism of the New World Translation relates to its rendering of the New Testament, particularly regarding the introduction of the name Jehovah and in passages related to the Trinity doctrine.

The offices of elder and ministerial servant were restored to Witness congregations in 1972. In a major organizational overhaul in 1976, the power of the Watch Tower Society president was diminished, with authority for doctrinal and organizational decisions being passed to the Governing Body. Knorr introduced these changes as he believed that people making spiritual decisions should be "called by Christ" rather than elected. The presidency's role transitioned into heading the denomination's legal entity. The distinction between these roles grew further when all Governing Body members resigned as directors and the Christian Congregation of Jehovah's Witnesses, Inc. was formed in 2000. Since Knorr's death in 1977, the presidency has been held by Frederick Franz, Milton Henschel, Don Alden Adams and Robert Ciranko.

=== Further development ===
From 1966, Witness publications and convention talks built anticipation of the possibility that Jesus' thousand-year reign might begin in 1975 or shortly thereafter. The number of baptisms increased significantly, from about 59,000 in 1966 to more than 297,000 in 1974. By 1975, the number of active members exceeded two million. From 1971 to 1981, there was a net increase of 737,241 publishers worldwide, while baptisms totaled 1.71 million for the same period. Watch Tower Society literature did not say that 1975 would definitely mark the end, though it was strongly implied. Frederick Franz, then–president of the Watchtower Bible and Tract Society, stated at a 1975 convention that the great tribulation could be expected to start by the end of that year. Many Jehovah's Witnesses acted upon this information by quitting their jobs and preaching more fervently. After that prediction failed, ordinary Jehovah's Witness members were blamed for believing in the date rather than the Governing Body acknowledging responsibility. Membership declined significantly for a few years after the failed prediction.

Jehovah's Witnesses have not set any specific dates for the end since 1975. Their publications emphasize that "one cannot know the day or the hour", but they still believe Armageddon to be imminent. Verse 34 of Matthew 24, where Jesus tells his disciples that "this generation will by no means pass away until all these things happen", was interpreted to refer to the generation of people alive in 1914. The initial teaching was that Armageddon would begin before the last person alive during that timeframe had died. The time limit was removed in 1995. This doctrine changed further in 2008, where generation was interpreted to refer to both the original anointed class and their remnant, the latter of which would be alive when Armageddon began. In 2010, the meaning of generation was re-interpreted to include individuals whose lives overlapped with anointed individuals alive during 1914.

== Organization ==
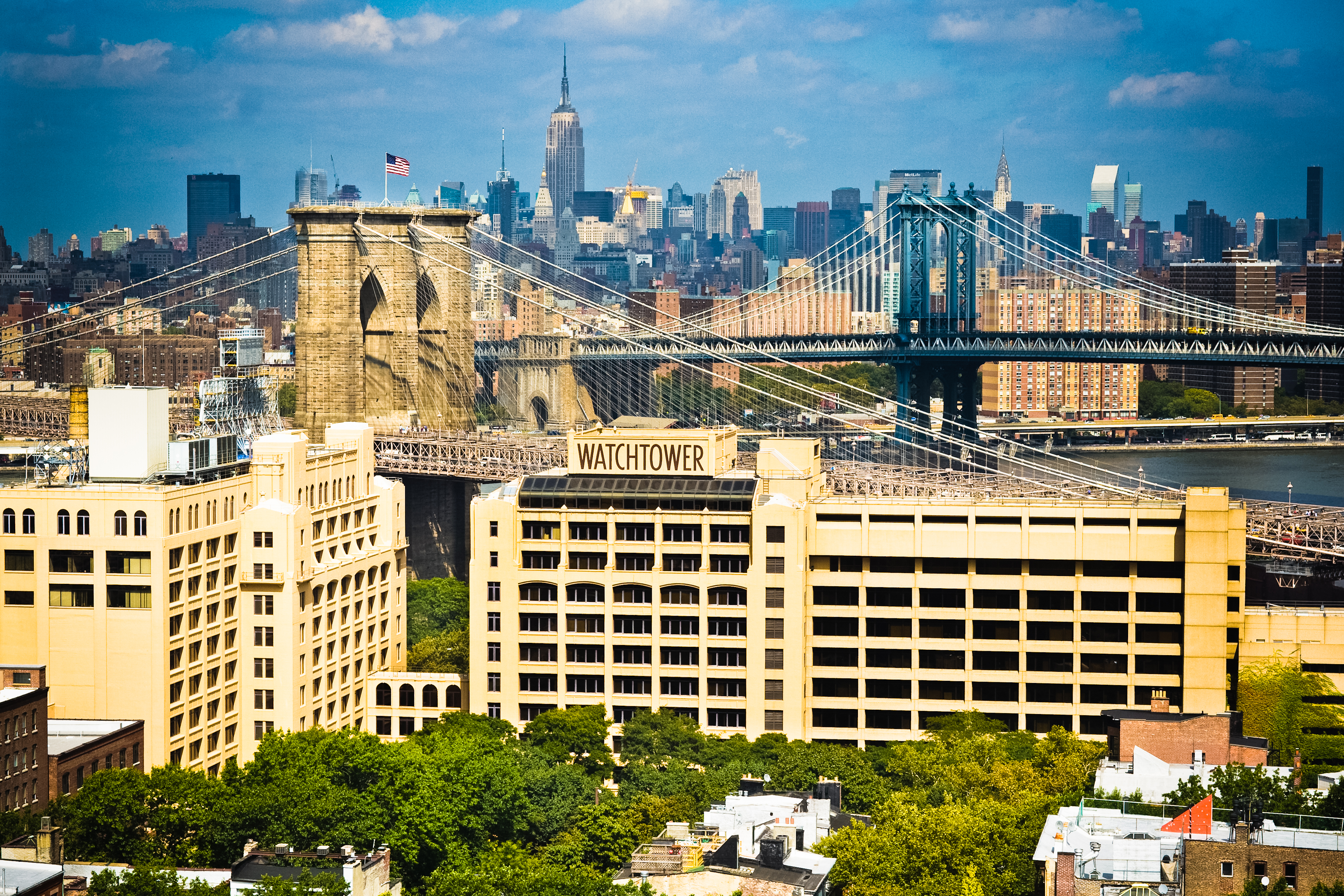
Former world headquarters of Jehovah's Witnesses

Jehovah's Witnesses are organized hierarchically, in what the leadership calls a theocratic organization, reflecting their belief that it is God's visible organization on earth. Jehovah's Witnesses establish branch offices to manage their activities in various countries or regions. Each branch office is also referred to as Bethel. Supporting staff live on these properties where they operate as a religious community and administrative unit. Their living expenses and those of other full-time volunteers are covered along with a basic monthly stipend. These volunteers are called Bethelites and are assigned specific tasks such as printing literature or doing laundry. They are allowed to marry but must leave Bethel if they have children. Bethelites are expected to read the Bible cover-to-cover during their first year of service. Consultants are sometimes hired for specialized tasks such as legal advice. Regular Jehovah's Witness members are encouraged to visit Bethel as a recreational activity.

Traveling overseers appoint local elders and ministerial servants, while branch offices may appoint regional committees for matters such as Kingdom Hall construction or disaster relief. Each congregation has a body of appointed unpaid male elders and ministerial servants. Elders maintain general responsibility for congregational governance, setting meeting times, selecting speakers and conducting meetings, directing the public preaching work, and creating judicial committees to investigate and decide disciplinary action for cases involving sexual misconduct or doctrinal breaches. New elders are appointed by a traveling overseer after recommendation by the existing body of elders. Ministerial servants—appointed in a similar manner as elders—fulfill clerical and attendant duties, but may also teach and conduct meetings. Jehovah's Witnesses do not use elder as a title to signify a formal clergy-laity division, though elders may employ ecclesiastical privilege regarding confession of sins.

Much of the denomination's funding is donated, primarily by members. There is no tithing or collection. In 2001 Newsday listed the Watch Tower Society as one of New York's 40 richest corporations, with revenues exceeding $950 million. In 2016, it ranked eighteenth for donations received by registered charities in Canada at $80 million. From 1969 until 2015, the denomination's headquarters were housed in Brooklyn, with plans to completely move its operations to Warwick in 2017. The property was sold to Kushner Companies for $340 million in 2016.

=== Governing Body ===
The denomination is led by the Governing Body—an all-male group that varies in size. The Governing Body directs several committees that are responsible for administrative functions, including publishing, assembly programs and evangelizing activities. Doctrines of Jehovah's Witnesses are established by the Governing Body, which assumes responsibility for interpreting and applying scripture. The Governing Body does not issue a single, comprehensive statement of faith, but expresses its doctrinal positions through publications published by the Watch Tower Society. The publications teach that doctrinal changes and refinements result from a process of progressive revelation, in which God gradually reveals his will and purpose, and that such enlightenment or "new light" results from the application of reason and study.

Sociologist Andrew Holden's ethnographic study of the group concluded that pronouncements of the Governing Body, through Watch Tower Society publications, carry almost as much weight as the Bible. The organization makes no provision for members to criticize or contribute to its teachings. Witness publications strongly discourage followers from questioning doctrine and counsel received from the Governing Body, reasoning that it is to be trusted as part of "God's organization". The denomination does not tolerate dissent over doctrines and practices; members who openly disagree with the group's teachings are expelled and shunned.

=== Gender roles ===
Jehovah's Witnesses have a complementarian view of women. Only men may hold positions of authority, such as ministerial servant or elder. Women may actively participate in the public preaching work, serve at Bethel, and profess to be members of the 144,000. They are not typically allowed to address the congregation directly. In rare circumstances, women can substitute in certain capacities if there are no eligible men. In these situations, women must wear a head covering if they are performing a teaching role. Jehovah's Witnesses believe that transgender people should live as the gender they were assigned at birth and view gender-affirming surgery as mutilation. Modesty in dress and grooming is frequently emphasized for both men and women.

== Beliefs ==
Jehovah's Witnesses believe their denomination is a restoration of first-century Christianity. They believe that mainstream Christianity departed from true worship over time, that groups such as Cathars attempted to restore some aspects of it, and that the Protestant Reformation "did not go far enough". Older books published by the Watch Tower Society such as those by Charles Russell and Joseph Rutherford are usually unfamiliar to a modern Jehovah's Witness, although some congregations have these publications in their libraries. Jehovah's Witnesses consider the Bible scientifically and historically accurate and reliable and interpret much of it literally, but accept parts of it as symbolic. Jehovah's Witnesses are old Earth creationists. The entire Protestant canon of scripture is considered the inspired, inerrant word of God. Regular personal Bible reading is frequently recommended. Members are discouraged from formulating doctrines and "private ideas" reached through Bible research independent of Watch Tower Society publications and are cautioned against reading other religious literature. Adherents commonly call their body of beliefs "The Truth".

=== Jehovah ===
Jehovah's Witnesses emphasize the use of God's name, and they prefer the form Jehovah—a vocalization of God's name based on the Tetragrammaton. They believe that Jehovah is the only true god, the creator of all things, and the "Universal Sovereign". They believe that all worship should be directed toward him, and that he is not part of a Trinity; consequently, the group places more emphasis on God than on Christ. They believe that the Holy Spirit is God's applied power or "active force". Jehovah's Witnesses believe that they can have a personal relationship with God.

=== Jesus ===
Jehovah's Witnesses believe that Jesus is God's only direct creation, that everything else was created through him by means of God's power, and that the initial unmediated act of creation uniquely identifies Jesus as God's "only-begotten Son". As part of their nontrinitarian beliefs, they do not believe that Jesus is God the Son. They do believe that he was the first angel, and is the only archangel. Jehovah's Witnesses believe that Mary conceived Jesus as a virgin but do not believe that she was born free from sin, that she remained a virgin after his birth or that she was physically assumed into heaven. Jehovah's Witnesses believe that Jesus served as a redeemer and a ransom sacrifice to atone for original sin. They believe that he died on a single upright post rather than a cross. They do not use the word "crucifixion" when referring to Jesus' death. They regard the cross as a pagan symbol, and veneration of the cross or other representations of Jesus' execution is considered idolatry. Jehovah's Witnesses believe that Jesus was resurrected with a "spirit body", and that he assumed human form only temporarily after his resurrection. Biblical references to Michael, Abaddon (Apollyon), and the Word are interpreted as names for Jesus in various roles. Jesus is considered the only intercessor and high priest between God and humanity, appointed by God as the king and judge of his kingdom.

=== Life after death ===
Jehovah's Witnesses believe death is a state of nonexistence with no consciousness. There is no Hell of fiery torment; Hades and Sheol are understood to refer to the condition of death, termed the common grave. They consider the soul a life or a living body that can die. They believe that humanity is in a sinful state, from which release is possible only by means of Jesus' shed blood as a ransom, or atonement, for humankind's sins. Jehovah's Witnesses believe that a "little flock" of 144,000 selected humans go to heaven, but that God will resurrect the majority (the "other sheep") to a cleansed earth after Armageddon. They interpret Revelation 14:1–5 to mean that the number of Christians going to heaven is limited to exactly 144,000, who will rule with Jesus as kings and priests over earth. They believe that baptism as a Jehovah's Witness is vital for salvation, and do not recognize baptism from other denominations as valid. Jehovah's Witnesses believe that some people who died before Armageddon will be resurrected, taught the proper way to worship God, and then face a final test at the end of the millennial reign. This judgment will be based on their actions after resurrection rather than past deeds. At the end of the thousand years, Jesus will hand all authority back to God. Then a final test will take place when Satan is released to mislead humankind. Those who fail will die, along with Satan and his demons. They also believe that those who rejected their beliefs while still alive will not be resurrected.

=== Eschatology ===
Jehovah's Witnesses believe that Satan was originally a perfect angel who developed feelings of self-importance and craved worship. Satan influenced Adam and Eve to disobey God, and humanity subsequently became participants in a challenge involving the competing claims of Jehovah and Satan to universal sovereignty. Jehovah's Witnesses believe that Jesus began to rule invisibly in heaven as king of God's kingdom in October 1914 and that Satan was subsequently ousted from heaven to the earth. They base this belief on a rendering of the Greek word parousia—usually translated as "coming" when referring to Jesus—as "presence". Jehovah's Witnesses believe that they are the kingdom's representatives on earth. They also believe that they must remain separate from human governments, which they consider to be controlled by Satan. The kingdom is viewed as the means by which God will accomplish his original purpose for the earth, transforming it into a paradise without sickness or death. Jehovah's Witnesses do not currently suggest any specific date for the end of the world, but Watch Tower Society literature has previously made such statements about 1914, 1925 and 1975. These failed predictions were presented as "beyond doubt" and "approved by God". Some Watch Tower Society publications state that God has used Jehovah's Witnesses and the International Bible Students as a modern-day prophet. (Note: Raymond Franz cites numerous examples. In Crisis of Conscience, 2002, pg. 173, he quotes from "They Shall Know That a Prophet Was Among Them". The Watchtower. April 1, 1972. pp. 197–200. which states that God had raised Jehovah's Witnesses as a prophet "to warn (people) of dangers and declare things to come". He also cites "Identifying the Right Kind of Messenger". The Watchtower. May 1, 1997. p. 8. which identifies the Witnesses as his "true messengers ... by making the messages he delivers through them come true", in contrast to "false messengers", whose predictions fail. In In Search of Christian Freedom, 2007, he quotes Commissioned to Speak in the Divine Name. Watchtower Bible and Tract Society. 1971. pp. 70, 292. which describes Witnesses as the modern Ezekiel class, "a genuine prophet within our generation". The Watch Tower book noted: "Concerning the message faithfully delivered by the Ezekiel class, Jehovah positively states that it 'must come true' ... those who wait undecided until it does 'come true' will also have to know that a prophet himself had proved to be in the midst of them." He also cites "Execution of the Great Harlot Nears". The Watchtower. October 15, 1980. p. 17. which claims God gives the Witnesses "special knowledge that others do not have ... advance knowledge about this system's end".)

A central teaching of Jehovah's Witnesses is that the world faces imminent destruction through intervention by God and Jesus Christ. This belief has been present since the group's founding. They believe that Jesus' was inaugurated as king in 1914 as part of a sign that the great tribulation is about to take place. Jehovah's Witnesses believe that all other present-day religions are false, identifying them with Babylon the Great, the "harlot" of Revelation 17. They believe that Nebuchadnezzar II had a dream where he saw a statue with a gold head, silver chest and arms, copper abdomen, iron legs, and feet that were a mixture of clay and iron. This dream is interpreted as a prophecy representing the rise and fall of empires: gold represents Babylon, silver represents Persia, copper represents Greece, iron represents Rome, and clay represents an Anglo-American empire. Jehovah's Witnesses believe that humanity is currently living in the last empire that will eventually be destroyed by the United Nations, which is also interpreted as the scarlet-colored wild beast. Satan will subsequently use world governments to attack Jehovah's Witnesses, which will prompt God to begin the war of Armageddon, during which all forms of human government will be destroyed and all people not counted as Jesus' sheep will be killed. After Armageddon, God will extend his heavenly kingdom to include earth, which will be transformed into a paradise like the Garden of Eden. They thus depart from the mainstream Christian belief that the "second coming" of Matthew 24 refers to a single moment of arrival on earth to judge humans.

=== Family life ===
Jehovah's Witnesses believe that dating should only occur if the couple is seriously considering marriage. Dating outside the denomination is strongly discouraged and can lead to religious sanctions. Dating Jehovah's Witnesses are encouraged to have a chaperone when they are together to avoid acting on sexual desires. All sexual relations outside marriage are grounds for expulsion if the person is not deemed repentant; homosexual activity is considered a serious sin, and same-sex marriage is forbidden. Masturbation is also prohibited.

Jehovah's Witnesses may marry at a Kingdom Hall in a simple ceremony and practices considered pagan such as wishing good luck or throwing rice are prohibited. An elder will give a talk to the congregation. Once married, a husband is considered to have spiritual headship over his wife, unless he is not one of Jehovah's Witnesses. Contraception is allowed. Divorce is forbidden if not sought on the grounds of adultery, which is called a "scriptural divorce". If a divorce is obtained for any other reason, remarriage is considered adulterous unless the former spouse has died or is considered to have committed sexual immorality. Spouses may separate in cases of domestic violence. Jehovah's Witness households are expected to have a family worship session each week.

== Practices ==
=== Baptism ===
Baptism is considered a requirement for salvation. Baptisms performed by other denominations are not considered valid. Before being baptized, a member will become an unbaptized publisher. Jehovah's Witnesses do not practice infant baptism but allow children to be baptized as long as they meet the same requirements as other candidates. To qualify for baptism, an individual must correctly answer more than a hundred questions about their own lifestyle and the denomination's beliefs. Individuals undergoing baptism are directed to affirm publicly that their dedication and baptism identifies each "as one of Jehovah's Witnesses in association with God's spirit-directed organization," though Witness publications say baptism symbolizes personal dedication to God and not "to a man, work or organization."

=== Worship ===
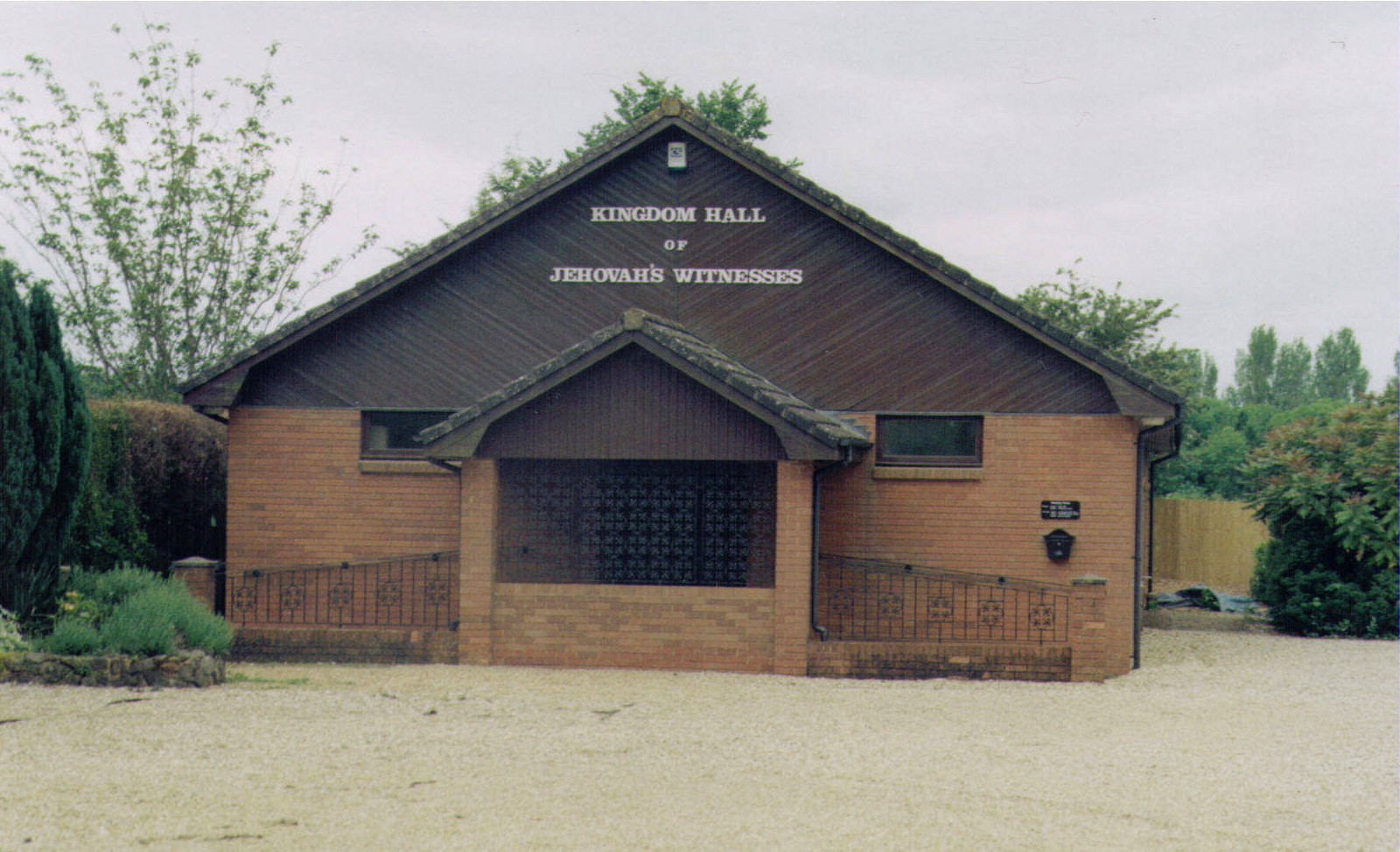
The exterior of a Kingdom Hall

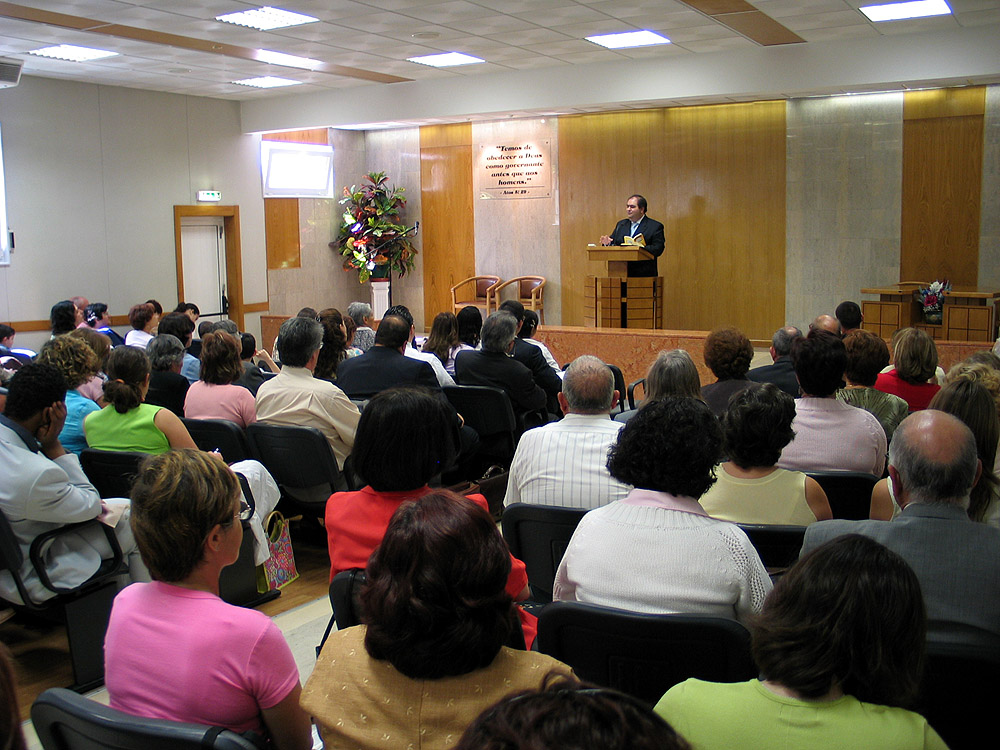
Worship at a Kingdom Hall in Portugal

Meetings for worship and study are held at Kingdom Halls, which are typically functional in character, and do not contain religious symbols. Witnesses are assigned to a congregation in whose "territory" they usually reside and attend weekly services they call "meetings", scheduled by congregation elders. The meetings are largely devoted to study of Watch Tower Society literature and the Bible. Jehovah's Witnesses have "considerable worldwide uniformity", as all congregations study the same materials on a schedule. Outsiders are encouraged to attend.

Historically, congregations met three times each week, but since 2009 meet for two sessions each week: one on a weekday and one on a weekend. Jehovah's Witnesses are expected to study the assigned material before attending. Children also attend meetings and do not have separate arrangements such as Sunday School. Gatherings are opened and closed with hymns called Kingdom songs and brief prayers. A Kingdom Hall may have multiple congregations that share the building. In 2014, decisions about which congregations would share a Kingdom Hall or whether additional Kingdom Halls should be built was transferred from individual congregations to the nearest branch office. After this change, many Kingdom Halls were sold.

Twice each year, Jehovah's Witnesses from a number of congregations that form a "circuit" gather for a one-day assembly. Larger groups of congregations meet annually for a three-day "regional convention", usually at an Assembly Hall built for this purpose. Rented stadiums or auditoriums are sometimes used instead. New members are baptized at these conventions. Jehovah's Witnesses consider their most important annual event to be the Memorial, which is observed on the fourteenth day of the Jewish month Nisan during Passover, and members advertise the event to outsiders. Unleavened bread and red wine is passed between attendees, but only those who consider themselves to be anointed partake (often with no one in attendance partaking), and a talk is given about the event's significance.

=== Evangelism ===
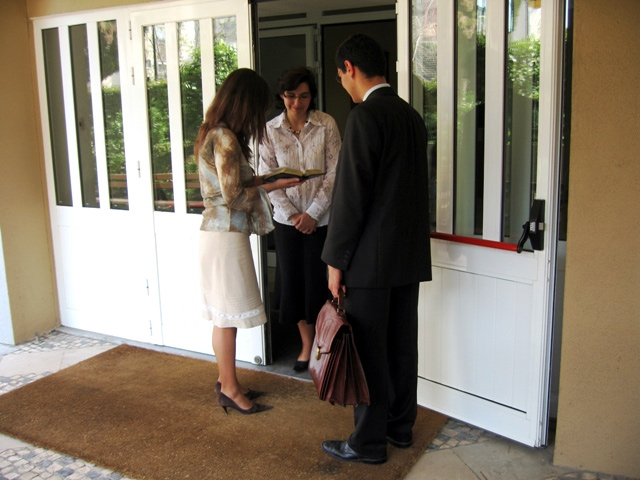
A pair of Jehovah's Witnesses preaching door-to-door

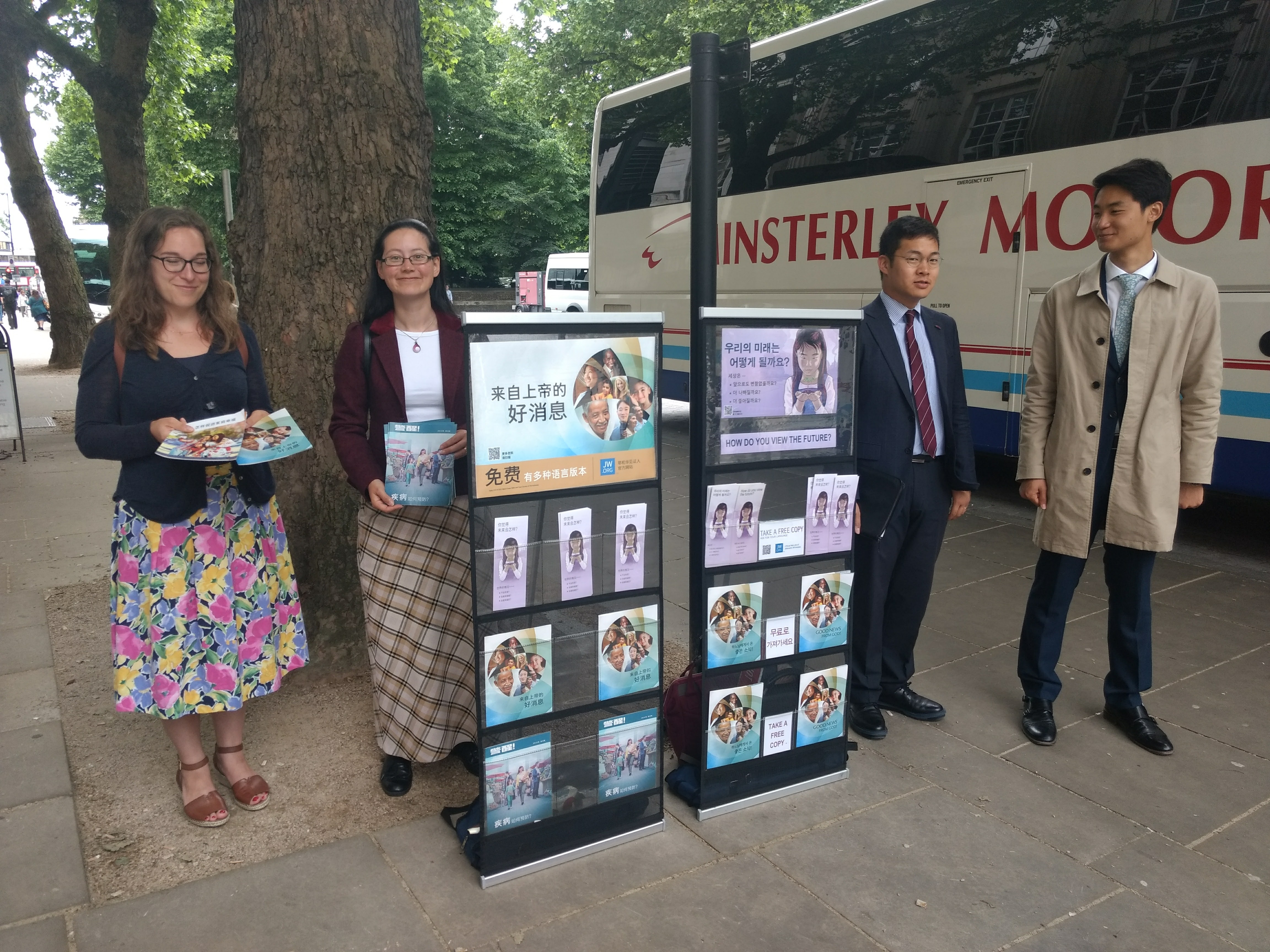
Jehovah's Witnesses outside the British Museum, 2017

Jehovah's Witnesses are known for their efforts to spread their beliefs, distributing Watch Tower Society literature. The objective is to start a regular "Bible study" with anyone who is not already a member, with the intention that the student be baptized as a member of the group; members are advised to consider discontinuing Bible study with students who show no interest in becoming members. While Jehovah's Witnesses are well known for visiting people's homes, they have a variety of preaching methods. Literature carts were introduced in 2012, where Jehovah's Witnesses stay in a public place and wait for people to approach them. Methods usually undertaken by those physically unable to engage in the door-to-door ministry include calling people by phone and writing letters. Jehovah's Witnesses are sometimes confused with Mormon missionaries. Converts as a result of their door-to-door evangelism are rare and happen at a rate comparable with other denominations that practice similar preaching methods.

Jehovah's Witnesses are taught that they are under a biblical command to engage in public preaching and often do so by working in pairs. They are instructed to devote as much time as possible to their ministry, and to submit a monthly "Field Service Report". Those who do not submit reports for six consecutive months are termed "inactive". Children also preach. Until 2023, every active Jehovah's Witness was expected to submit the number of hours they spent preaching in their monthly field service report. In November 2023, this requirement was modified to only apply to members who have agreed to a specific hour requirement. As of 2025, auxiliary pioneers preach for 30 hours, regular pioneers preach for 50 hours per month; special pioneers preach for 100 hours each month, often in remote or under-represented areas, and receive a stipend to help pay for their living expenses. Other members are only required to indicate they engaged in some form of ministry during the month, along with any Bible studies they conducted. In 2025, Jehovah's Witnesses conducted about 7.6 million Bible studies (including studies conducted with their own children), and approximately 304,500 new members were baptized.

The denomination produces a significant amount of literature as part of its evangelism activities. In 2010, The Watchtower and Awake! were the world's most widely distributed magazines. Jehovah's Witnesses consider their literature to be "spiritual food" and provide it to interested parties for free. The group launched its first website in 1997: watchtower.org. In 2008, it was replaced with jw.org. Their website is often referenced in their evangelism, with its logo appearing in literature displays and outside Kingdom Halls. An increased reliance on electronic media has reduced their printing costs. The denomination archives most of its literature online, although certain entries have been changed after publication. It also offers a streaming service called JW Broadcasting. An animated series aimed at children has been produced called "Become Jehovah's Friend". An application, JW Language, has been designed to facilitate preaching with people who speak different languages. A specialized device for use in areas with limited internet access offers downloaded materials relevant to Jehovah's Witnesses.

=== Disciplinary action ===
Jehovah's Witnesses require individuals to be baptized by the denomination in order to be subject to their disciplinary procedures. The denomination does not tolerate dissent over doctrines and practices; members who openly disagree with the group's teachings are expelled, shunned, and condemned as apostates who are "mentally diseased". Some adherents "fade" and stop attending meetings without being formally subjected to the group's disciplinary procedures, although some former members have still experienced shunning through this method.

Members accused of persistent wrongdoing are brought to the attention of the elders who will then evaluate possible consequences. Members who have violated the group's standards—for example, dating a non-member—but not otherwise committed a serious sin may be "marked". Congregation members who are aware of another member's errant behaviour are advised to limit social contact with the marked individual. Elders may decide to form a committee in cases involving serious sin, which may result in the member being reproved or shunned. This process requires three elders to meet with the accused. These cases usually involve sexual misconduct or apostasy. Other serious sins involve accepting blood transfusions (which does not require a judicial committee), smoking, using recreational drugs, divorce (unless a spouse committed adultery), celebration of holidays or birthdays, abortion (which is considered murder), and political activities such as voting in elections. Procedures related to congregational discipline are primarily described in the book, Shepherd the Flock of God, provided only to elders. People who formally leave Jehovah's Witnesses are considered to be "disassociated" and are also shunned. Jehovah's Witnesses can also be disassociated for accepting a blood transfusion.

The practice of shunning may serve to deter other members from dissident behavior. Shunning also helps maintain a "uniformity of belief". Shunned individuals may experience suicidal ideation and often struggle with feelings of low self esteem, shame, and guilt. Former members may experience significant mental distress as a result of being shunned and some seek reinstatement to maintain contact with their friends and family. Former members may also experience ambiguous loss or panic attacks. Expelled individuals may eventually be reinstated to the congregation if deemed repentant by congregation elders, and some seek reinstatement to maintain contact with their friends and family. Reinstatement can be a long process, which may be mentally and emotionally draining. Funerals for expelled members may not be performed at Kingdom Halls.

Baptized children are also subject to the same moral standards and consequences for failing to comply. They are allowed to stay with their families until reaching the age of majority. Jehovah's Witnesses lost state funding as a religious community in Norway because of its shunning policy, with the country concluding that shunning, particularly of children, constitutes psychological violence. Subsequently, the group made some changes to its shunning policy in 2024; individuals may offer "simple greetings" to shunned members instead of completely avoiding them if the individual is not deemed to be an apostate. As of 2024, two elders may have a more informal meeting with a minor who is considered to have committed a "serious sin" along with his or her parents before deciding whether a formal committee meeting is required. Parents are also no longer prohibited from attending judicial committees with minors.

=== Separateness ===
Jehovah's Witnesses believe that the Bible condemns mixing religions, on the basis that there can only be one truth from God, and therefore reject interfaith and ecumenical movements. They believe that only Jehovah's Witnesses represent true Christianity and that other denominations do not meet God's requirements; all other Christian denominations (collectively referred to as "Christendom") along with all other religions are considered "false religion". Jehovah's Witnesses are taught that it is vital to remain "separate from the world." Their literature defines the "world" as "the mass of mankind apart from Jehovah's approved servants" and teach that it is morally contaminated and ruled by Satan. Jehovah's Witnesses are taught that association with "worldly" people presents a danger to their faith.

For many years, the Watch Tower Society stated that secondary education is "spiritually dangerous" as it requires extended association with those outside the group. The denomination also presented further education as unnecessary in view of their belief that Armageddon is imminent. Trade schools were suggested as an alternative. Adolescent Jehovah's Witnesses are also encouraged to become Bethelites. In 2025, the view of higher education was adjusted, with a statement that, "While there are dangers involved in pursuing certain forms of education, basically, whether to obtain additional education or not is a matter for personal decision," and that, "no Christian—including the elders—should judge a fellow Christian's personal decision on this matter."

Jehovah's Witnesses do not celebrate religious holidays such as Christmas and Easter, nor do they observe birthdays, national holidays, or other celebrations they consider to honor people other than Jesus. They believe that these and many other customs have pagan origins or reflect nationalistic spirit. Members are told that spontaneous giving at other times can help their children to not feel deprived of birthdays or other celebrations. Wedding anniversaries are allowed. Jehovah's Witnesses are not permitted to work in industries associated with the military and refuse national military service, which in some countries may result in their arrest and imprisonment. They also refuse to salute flags or participate in patriotic activities. Adherents see themselves as a worldwide brotherhood that transcends national boundaries and ethnic loyalties.

Jehovah's Witnesses are often viewed as being without agency or brainwashed by the anti-cult movement. Andrew Holden believes that most members who join millenarian movements such as Jehovah's Witnesses have made an informed choice, but that defectors "are seldom allowed a dignified exit", and describes the administration as autocratic. Sociologist Rodney Stark believes that Jehovah's Witness leaders are "not always very democratic" and that members "are expected to conform to rather strict standards," but adds that "enforcement tends to be very informal, sustained by the close bonds of friendship within the group", and that members see themselves as "part of the power structure rather than subject to it."

After the publication in 1984 of The Elementary Forms of New Religious Life, academics began to describe various new religious movements as either world-affirming, world-accommodating, or world-rejecting. Jehovah's Witnesses were labelled as world-rejecting. Sociologist Bryan R. Wilson believed that Jehovah's Witnesses conflict with society at large, impose "tests of merit on would-be members", have strict disciplinary procedures, and expect absolute commitment. Sociologist Ronald Lawson has suggested that the group's intellectual and organizational isolation, coupled with the intense indoctrination of adherents, rigid internal discipline, and considerable persecution, has contributed to the consistency of its sense of urgency in its apocalyptic message.

Alan Rogerson describes the group's leadership as totalitarian, while historian James Irvin Lichti rejects this interpretation. James A. Beckford, a sociologist of religion, classified the group's organizational structure as totalizing, with assertive leadership, specific and narrow objectives, control over competing demands on members' time and energy, and control over the quality of new members. Other characteristics of the classification include likelihood of friction with secular authorities, reluctance to cooperate with other religious organizations, a high rate of membership turnover, a low rate of doctrinal change, and strict uniformity of beliefs among members. Beckford also identified the group's chief characteristics as historicism (identifying historical events as relating to the outworking of God's purpose), absolutism (conviction that Jehovah's Witness leaders dispense absolute truth), activism (capacity to motivate members to perform missionary tasks), rationalism (conviction that Witness doctrines have a rational basis devoid of mystery), authoritarianism (rigid presentation of regulations without the opportunity for criticism) and world indifference (rejection of certain secular requirements and medical treatments).

Former members Heather Botting and Gary Botting compare the cultural paradigms of the denomination to George Orwell's Nineteen Eighty-Four. Critics believe that by disparaging individual decision-making, the group's leaders cultivate a system of unquestioning obedience in which members abrogate responsibility and rights over their personal lives. Critics also accuse the group's leaders of exercising "intellectual dominance" over adherents, controlling information, and creating "mental isolation", which former Governing Body member Raymond Franz argued were all elements of mind control. Some Jehovah's Witnesses describe themselves to academics as "Physically In, Mentally Out" (PIMO); these individuals privately question certain doctrine but remain inside the organization to maintain contact with their friends and family.

=== Rejection of blood transfusions ===
Jehovah's Witnesses are told to reject the transfusion of whole blood, which they consider a violation of God's law based on their interpretation of Acts 15:28, 29 and other scriptures. This prohibition has existed since 1945. They also do not eat blood-based foods, such as blood sausage. Since 1961, acceptance of a whole blood transfusion without subsequent repentance has been grounds for expulsion from the group. Members were directed to refuse blood transfusions, even in "a life-or-death situation". Their literature implied that there was a blood alternative for every medical situation and emphasized "the danger of blood transfusions". For many years, autologous blood donation, where one's own blood is stored for later use, was also forbidden; on 20 March 2026, the blood transfusion policy was revised, allowing members to have their own blood drawn and stored for medical or surgical procedures that may require a transfusion. On September 18, 2026, the policy was further revised, prohibiting only the transfusion of whole blood; members may decide to receive or donate packed red cells, platelets, white cells or plasma for medical use. Some Jehovah's Witnesses have accepted prohibited blood products where medical confidentiality has been maintained, although Jehovah's Witnesses who work in a hospital may break such confidentiality. Jehovah's Witness patients are generally open to non-blood alternative treatments, even if they are less effective.

Courts have intervened in life-threatening situations involving children that require blood transfusions to allow the treatment to take place. Courts may allow mature minors to reject blood transfusions based on their beliefs. The May 22, 1994, issue of Awake! entitled Youths Who Put God First featured children who refused blood transfusions and subsequently died.

The Watch Tower Society provides pre-formatted durable power of attorney documents regarding blood, in which members can specify which allowable fractions and treatments they will accept. The denomination has established Hospital Liaison Committees as a cooperative arrangement between individual Jehovah's Witness members and medical professionals and hospitals to provide information about bloodless treatment options. Patients who accept certain blood products in the committee's presence are deemed to have disassociated and are shunned. The National Secular Society advocates against hospitals partnering with hospital liaison committees due to medical coercion.

=== Handling of sexual abuse cases ===
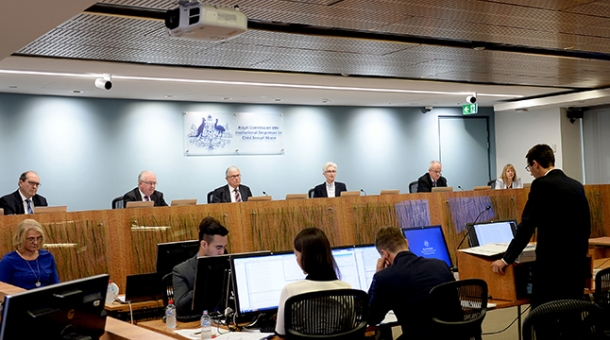
Case study of Jehovah's Witnesses in Australia's Royal Commission into Institutional Responses to Child Sexual Abuse

Jehovah's Witnesses have been accused of having policies and culture that help to conceal cases of sexual abuse within the organization. When investigating cases of child abuse, elders are instructed to immediately call the organization's headquarters or branch office. The group states that this requirement is to ensure compliance with the law. An investigation by the Canadian Broadcasting Corporation determined that elders were asked questions such as, "How many elders believe the victim is to blame or willingly participated in the act?" Jehovah's Witnesses have been criticized for the "two witness rule" for congregational discipline, based on an application of scriptures in Deuteronomy 19:15 and Matthew 18:15–17, which requires sexual abuse to be substantiated by secondary evidence if the accused person denies wrongdoing. In cases where corroboration is lacking, the Watch Tower Society's instruction is that "the elders will leave the matter in Jehovah's hands". A former member has said that the policy effectively requires that there be third-party witness to an act of molestation, "which is an impossibility". Jehovah's Witnesses maintain a database of confidential files in regards to child abuse, which are marked as "Do Not Destroy". An elder in New Zealand was tasked with destroying "personal notes" in their database when the organization was under investigation for child abuse. In the United States, the group was fined four-thousand dollars daily (accruing a total of two million dollars) for delaying an order to provide its documentation.

The group's failure to report abuse allegations to authorities has also been criticized. The Watch Tower Society's policy is that elders inform authorities when required by law to do so, but otherwise leave that up to the victim and their family. In jurisdictions with priest–penitent privilege, confessions of abuse may be considered confidential. William Bowen, a former Jehovah's Witness elder who established the Silentlambs organization to assist sex abuse victims in the denomination, has claimed that Witness leaders discourage followers from reporting incidents of sexual misconduct to authorities. Other critics have alleged that the organization is reluctant to alert authorities to protect its "crime-free" reputation. However, in response to the charge that their policies "protect pedophiles rather than protect the children", the organization has maintained that the best way to protect children is to educate parents; they also say they do not sponsor activities that separate children from parents. In court cases in the United Kingdom and the United States, the Watch Tower Society has been found negligent in its protection of children from known sex offenders within the congregation. The Society has settled other child abuse lawsuits out of court, paying $780,000 in one case. In 2015, the Australian Royal Commission into Institutional Responses to Child Sexual Abuse found that "there was no evidence before the Royal Commission of the Jehovah's Witness organisation having or not having reported to police any of the 1,006 alleged perpetrators of child sexual abuse identified by the organisation since 1950." The Royal Commission also found that the Watch Tower Society legal department routinely provided incorrect information to elders based on an incorrect understanding of what constitutes a legal obligation to report crimes in Australia. In 2017, the Charity Commission for England and Wales began an inquiry into Jehovah's Witnesses' handling of allegations of child sexual abuse in the United Kingdom. In 2021, Jehovah's Witnesses in Australia agreed to join the nation's redress scheme for sexual assault survivors to maintain its charity status there.

== Government interactions ==
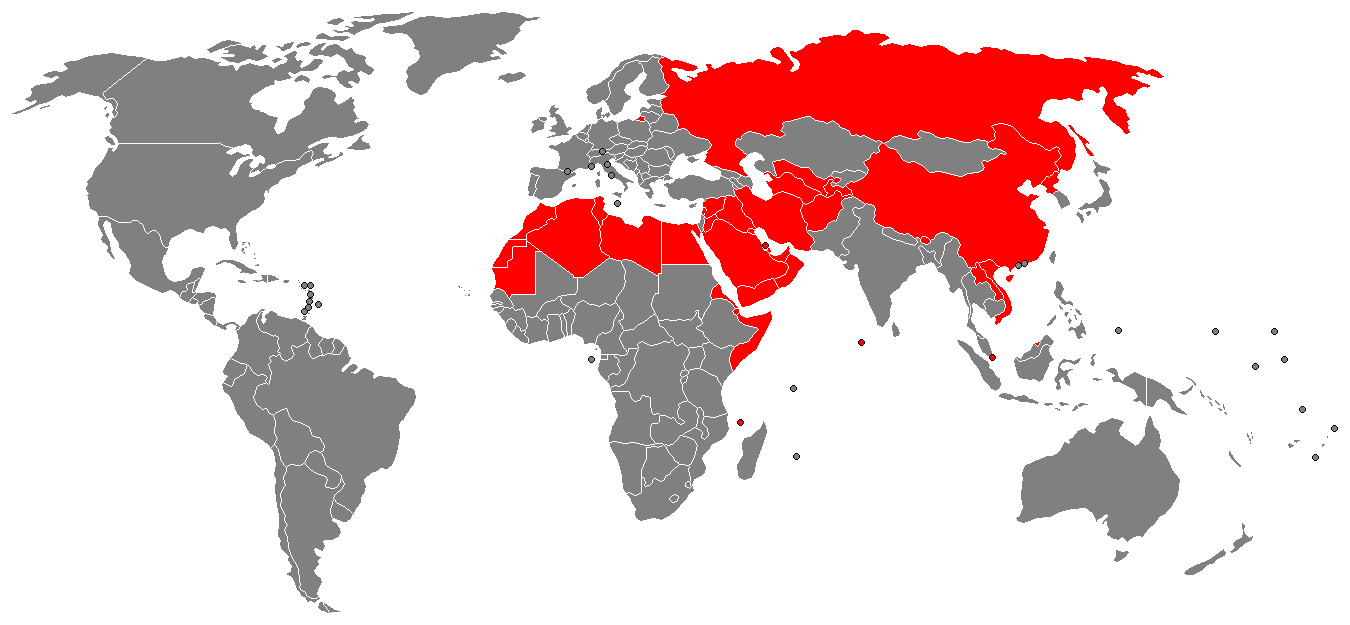
Countries where Jehovah's Witnesses' activities are banned

Controversy about various beliefs, doctrines and practices of Jehovah's Witnesses has led to opposition from governments, communities, and other religious groups. Religious commentator Ken Jubber wrote, "Viewed globally, this persecution has been so persistent and of such intensity that it would not be inaccurate to regard Jehovah's Witnesses as the most persecuted group of Christians of the twentieth century." Several cases involving Jehovah's Witnesses have been heard by Supreme Courts worldwide. They generally relate to the right to practice their religion, displays of patriotism and military service, and blood transfusions. Cases in their favor have been heard in the United States, Canada and many European countries.

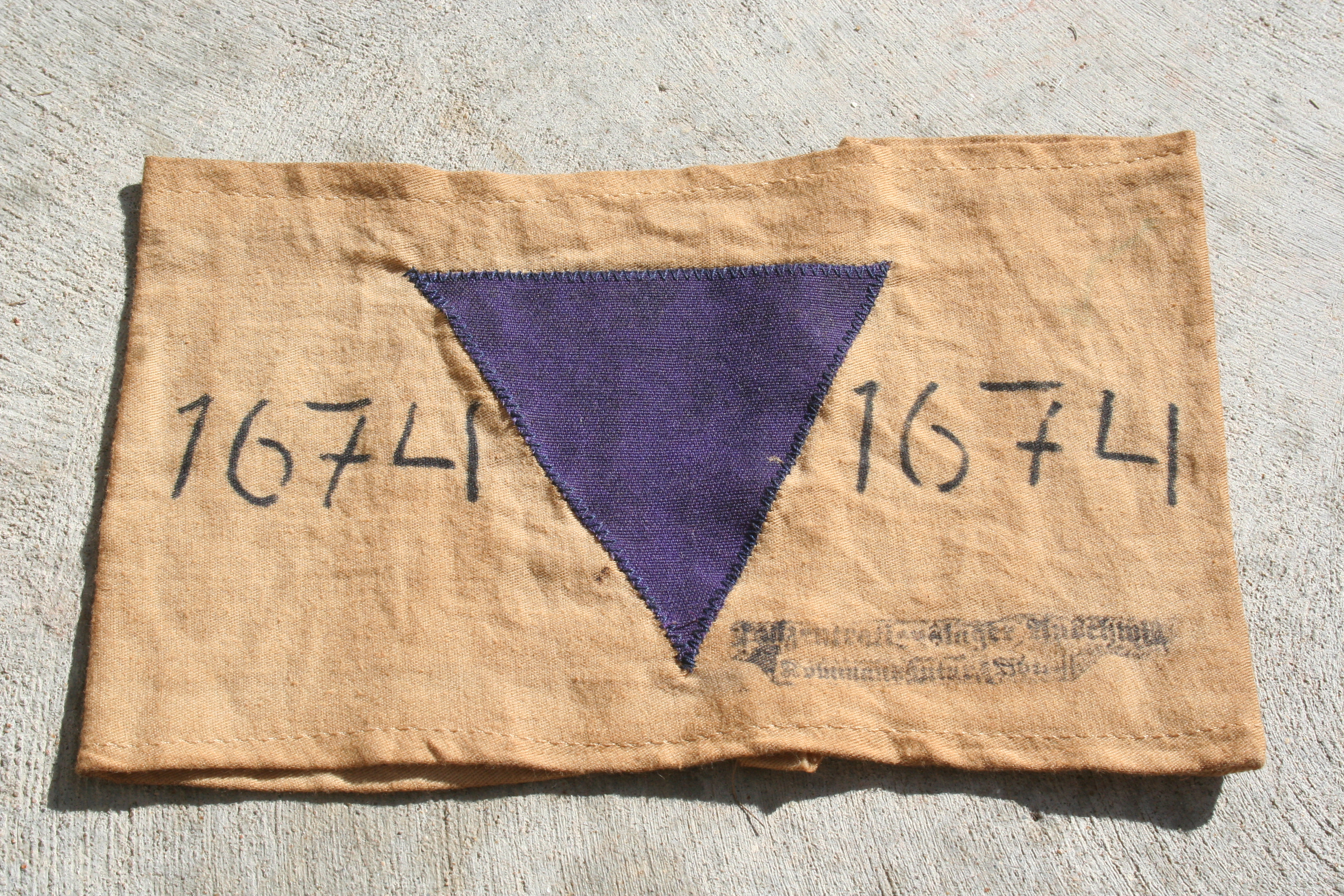
Jehovah's Witness prisoners were identified by purple triangle badges in Nazi concentration camps.

In 1933, there were approximately 20,000 Jehovah's Witnesses in Nazi Germany, of whom about 10,000 were imprisoned. Jehovah's Witnesses suffered religious persecution by the Nazis because they refused military service and allegiance to Hitler's Nazi Party. Of those, 2,000 were sent to Nazi concentration camps, where they were identified by purple triangles; as many as 1,200 died, including 250 who were executed. Jehovah's Witnesses were hanged, beheaded, beaten to death, or shot dead. Conditions improved in 1942, when Jehovah's Witnesses were increasingly given work details that required little supervision, such as farming, gardening, transportation and unloading goods, while others worked in civilian clothing in a health resort, as housekeepers for Nazi officials, or were given construction and craft tasks at military buildings. Unlike Jews and Romani, who were persecuted on the basis of their ethnicity, Jehovah's Witnesses could escape persecution and personal harm by signing a document indicating renunciation of their faith, submission to state authority, and support of the German military. Historian Sybil Milton writes, "their courage and defiance in the face of torture and death punctures the myth of a monolithic Nazi state ruling over docile and submissive subjects." Jehovah's Witnesses would preach inside of the concentration camps, hold meetings, and smuggle in their religious literature.

Political and religious animosity toward Jehovah's Witnesses has at times led to mob action and government oppression in various countries. Their political neutrality and refusal to serve in the military has led to imprisonment of members who refused conscription during World War II and other periods of compulsory national service, especially in countries that do not provide religious exemptions. Their religious activities are banned or restricted in some countries, including China, Russia, Vietnam, and many Muslim-majority countries.

== See also ==
- Bibliography of works on Jehovah's Witnesses
- Criticism of Jehovah's Witnesses
- List of Supreme Court cases involving Jehovah's Witnesses

== Sources ==
- Beckford, James A. (1975). The Trumpet of Prophecy: A Sociological Study of Jehovah's Witnesses. Oxford: Basil Blackwell. ISBN 978-0-631-16310-7.
- Bergman, Jerry (1995). "The Adventist and Jehovah's Witness Branch of Protestantism". In Miller, Timothy (ed.). America's Alternative Religions. Albany, NY: SUNY Press. pp. 33–46. ISBN 978-0-7914-2397-4. Archived from the original on July 24, 2020.
- Botting, Gary (1993). Fundamental Freedoms and Jehovah's Witnesses. University of Calgary Press. ISBN 978-1-895176-06-3.
- Botting, Heather; Botting, Gary (1984). The Orwellian World of Jehovah's Witnesses. University of Toronto Press. ISBN 978-0-8020-6545-2.
- Chryssides, George D. (2008). Historical Dictionary of Jehovah's Witnesses. Lanham, Md: Scarecrow Press. ISBN 978-0-8108-6074-2.
- ——— (2016a). Jehovah's Witnesses: Continuity and Change. Ashgate New Religions. Farnham, Surrey: Ashgate Publishing. ISBN 9781409456087.
- ——— (2016b). "Jehovah's Witnesses: Anticipating Armageddon". In Hunt, Stephen J. (ed.). Handbook of Global Contemporary Christianity: Movements, Institutions, and Allegiance. Brill. pp. 422–440. ISBN 978-90-04-31078-0.
- ——— (2019). "'Be not conformed' - A historical survey of the Watch Tower Society's relationship with society". In Besier, Gerhard; Huhta, Ilkka (eds.). Religious Freedom: Its Confirmation and Violation During the 20th and 21st Centuries. 18. Jahrgang (2017), Heft 1+2. Issue 1–2 de Religion – Staat – Gesellschaft – Zeitsch, ISSN 1438-955X / Religion, Staat, Gesellschaft : Zeitschrift für Glaubensformen und Weltanschauungen. Vol. 18. LIT Verlag Münster. ISBN 9783643997456.
- ——— (2022). Jehovah's Witnesses: A New Introduction. Bloomsbury Academic. ISBN 978-1-3501-9089-4.
- Chu, Jolene; Peltonen, Ollimatti (2025). Jehovah's Witnesses. Elements in New Religious Movements. Cambridge: Cambridge University Press. doi:10.1017/9781009375191. ISBN 978-1-009-37519-1.
- Crompton, Robert (1996). Counting the Days to Armageddon. Cambridge: James Clarke & Co. ISBN 0-227-67939-3.
- Franz, Raymond (2007). In Search of Christian Freedom. Commentary Press. ISBN 978-0-914675-16-7. ISBN 978-0-914675-17-4
- Hoekema, Anthony A. (1963). The Four Major Cults. Grand Rapids, Michigan: William B. Eerdmans. ISBN 978-0-8028-3117-0.
- Holden, Andrew (2002). Jehovah's Witnesses: Portrait of a Contemporary Religious Movement. Routledge. ISBN 978-0-415-26610-9.
- Knox, Zoe (2018). Jehovah's Witnesses and the Secular World: From the 1870s to the Present. London: Palgrave Macmillan. ISBN 978-1-137-39604-4.
- Penton, M. James (1997). Apocalypse Delayed: The Story of Jehovah's Witnesses. University of Toronto Press. ISBN 978-0-8020-7973-2.
- Reynaud, Michel; Graffard, Sylvie (2001). The Jehovah's Witnesses and the Nazis: Persecution, Deportation and Murder. Cooper Square Press. ISBN 0-8154-1076-X.
- Richardson, James T. (2015). "In Defense of Religious Rights: Jehovah's Witness Legal Cases around the World". In Hunt, Stephen J. (ed.). Handbook of Global Contemporary Christianity. Brill. pp. 285–307. ISBN 978-90-04-29102-7.
- Rogerson, Alan (1969). Millions Now Living Will Never Die. London: Constable & Co. ISBN 978-0094559400.
