= Bibliography of Jehovah's Witnesses =

This is a bibliography of works on Jehovah's Witnesses.

== General ==
- Stroup, Herbert (1945). The Jehovah's Witnesses.
- Pike, Royston (1954). Jehovah's Witnesses: Who They Are, What They Teach, What They Do. London: Watts.
- Cole, Marley (1955). Jehovah's Witnesses: The New World Society.
- Whalen, William Joseph (1962). Armageddon around the corner: A report on Jehovah's Witnesses. J. Day Co. ASIN B0007DXV5Q. OCLC 1261733.
- Rogerson, Alan (1969). Millions Now Living Will Never Die: A Study of Jehovah's Witnesses. Constable. ISBN 978-0094559400.
- Beckford, James (1975). The Trumpet of Prophecy.
- Bergman, Jerry (1984). Jehovah's Witnesses and Kindred Groups: A Historical Compendium and Bibliography. Garland Publishing. ISBN 9780824091095.
- Kaplan, William (1989). State and Salvation. Toronto: University of Toronto Press. ISBN 0-8020-5842-6.
- Curry, Melvin (1992). The Millenarian World of Watch Tower.
- Crompton, Robert (1996). Counting the Days to Armageddon. Cambridge: James Clarke & Co. ISBN 0-227-67939-3.
- Jehovah's Witnesses—Proclaimers of God's Kingdom. Watchtower Bible and Tract Society of New York & International Bible Students Association. 1993. ASIN B0012ZL9IO.
- Bergman, Jerry (1999). Jehovah's Witnesses: A Comprehensive and Selectively Annotated Bibliography. Bibliographies and Indexes in Religious Studies (Book 48) (Annotated ed.). Greenwood. ISBN 978-0313305108.
- Gruss, Edmond C. (2001). Jehovah's Witnesses : their claims, doctrinal changes, and prophetic speculation : what does the record show?. Fairfax, VA: Xulon Press. ISBN 9781931232302.
- Holden, Andrew. Jehovah's Witnesses: Portrait of a Contemporary Religious Movement New York: Routledge, 2002, ISBN 0415266092
- Gruss, Edmond C. (2003). The Four Presidents of the Watch Tower Society (Jehovah's Witnesses): The Men and the Organization They Created. Xulon Press. ISBN 9781594671319.
- Daschke, Dereck; Ashcraft, W. Michael (2005). "Chapter 14: Jehovah's Witnesses". New Religious Movements. NYU Press. ISBN 978-0814707029.
- Wills, Tony (2006). A People for His Name: A History of Jehovah's Witnesses and an Evaluation (2nd ed.). ISBN 978-1-4303-0100-4.
- Knocking (2006), film about legal challenges faced by Jehovah's Witnesses
- Beaman, Lori (2008). Defining Harm: Religious Freedom and the Limits of the Law. UBC Press. ISBN 978-0-7748-1429-4.
- Chryssides, George D. (2008). Historical Dictionary of Jehovah's Witnesses. Historical Dictionaries of Religions, Philosophies, and Movements Series. Lanham, Md.: Scarecrow Press. ISBN 9780810860742.
- Chryssides, George D. (2009). The A to Z of Jehovah's Witnesses. The A to Z Guide Series. Lanham, Md.: Scarecrow Press. ISBN 9780810868915.
- Schulz, B. W.; de Vienne, R. M. (2009). Nelson Barbour: The Millennium's Forgotten Prophet. Fluttering Wings Press. ASIN B003B4A6N8.
- Schulz, B. W. (2014). A Separate Identity: Organizational Identity Among Readers of Zion's Watch Tower: 1870-1887. ISBN 978-1304969408.
- Chryssides, George D. (2016). Jehovah's Witnesses: Continuity and Change. Routledge New Religions. Routledge. ISBN 9781409456087.
- Knox, Zoe (2018). Jehovah's Witnesses and the Secular World: From the 1870s to the Present. Histories of the Sacred and Secular, 1700-2000. London: Palgrave Macmillan. ISBN 9781137396044.
- Chryssides, George (2022). Jehovah's Witnesses: A New Introduction. Bloomsbury Academic. ISBN 978-1-3501-9089-4.

== Critiques and personal accounts ==
- Schnell, William J. 30 Years a Watchtower Slave. Grand Rapids, Michigan: Baker Books, 1956, 1971, reprinted 2001. ISBN 0-8010-6384-1 ISBN 978-0-8010-6384-8
- Macmillan, A. H. (1957). Faith on the March. Prentice-Hall. ISBN 9785872321002.
- Schnell, William J. Jehovah's Witnesses' Errors Exposed. Grand Rapids, Mich.: Baker Book House, [ca. 1980], cop. 1959. N.B.: First published in 1959 under the title: Into the Light of Christianity. ISBN 0-8010-8074-6
- Stevenson, W. C. (1967). Year of Doom — 1975: The Story of Jehovah's Witnesses. London: Hutchinson. "In 1968 the book was entitled Inside Story of Jehovah's Witnesses and released by Hart Publishing Company of New York City."
- Gruss, Edmond Charles (October 1970). Apostles of Denial: An Examination and Expose of the History, Doctrines and Claims of the Jehovah's Witnesses (6th Printing ed.). Presbyterian & Reformed Pub Co. ISBN 978-0875523057.
- Denscher, Ted (1974). An Alarming Situation for Jehovah's Witnesses, Christian Literature Crusade.
- Harrison, Barbara Grizzuti (1980). Visions of Glory: A History and a Memory of Jehovah's Witnesses (Abridged ed.). London: Hale. ISBN 0-7091-8013-6. "Originally published in New York by Simon and Schuster in 1978"
- Chretien, Leonard; Chretien, Marjorie (1990). Witnesses of Jehovah. Monarch Pubns. ISBN 978-1854240729.
- Reed, David A. (1996). Answering Jehovah's Witnesses: Subject by Subject. Grand Rapids, Mich.: Baker Books. ISBN 080105317X.
- Hewitt, Joe (1997). I Was Raised a Jehovah's Witness. Kregel Publications ISBN 0-8254-2876-9
- Penton, M. James (1997). Apocalypse Delayed: The Story of Jehovah's Witnesses (Second ed.). Toronto: University of Toronto Press. ISBN 0-8020-7973-3.
- Stafford, Greg (1998). Jehovah's Witnesses Defended: An Answer to Scholars and Critics.
- Jonsson, Carl O. (1998, 2004). The Gentile Times Reconsidered: Chronology & Christ's Return. Commentary Press ISBN 0-914675-06-0
- Evert, Jason (2001). Answering Jehovah's Witnesses. San Diego, CA: Catholic Answers. ISBN 1888992212.
- Kostelniuk, James (2001). Wolves Among Sheep: The True Story of Murder in a Jehovah’s Witness Community. HarperCollins Publishers Canada. ISBN 978-0-00-639107-4
- Stafford, Greg (2002). Three Dissertations on the Teachings of Jehovah's Witnesses.
- Franz, Raymond. Crisis of Conscience. Commentary Press. 420 pages. Hardback ISBN 0-914675-24-9. Paperback ISBN 0-914675-23-0. 4th edition (June 2002)
- Castro, Joy (2005). The Truth Book: Escaping a Childhood of Abuse Among Jehovah's Witnesses. Arcade Publishing. ISBN 978-1559707879.
- King, Robert (2005). Jehovah Himself Has Become King. AuthorHouse (First Edition) ISBN 978-1-4208-5498-5
- Franz, Raymond (2007). In Search of Christian Freedom (Second ed.). Atlanta: Commentary Press. ISBN 978-0-914675-17-4. Originally published in 1991. ISBN 0914675141.
- Rodriguez, Daniel (2011). Winning the Witnesses. Chick Publications. ISBN 9780758908483.
- Gaskill, Alonzo L. (2016). Know Your Religions Volume 3: A Comparative Look at Mormons and Jehovah's Witnesses. Cedar Fort. ISBN 9781462127092.
- Andrews, Edward D. (2017). Investigating Jehovah's Witnesses: Why 1914 Is Important to Jehovah's Witnesses. Christian Publishing House. ISBN 978-1945757518.
- "The Jehovah's Witnesses". Leah Remini: Scientology and the Aftermath. Season 3. 2018.
- Vice Versa: Crusaders (2021), film by Aaron Kaufman about sexual abuse within the group
- Leaving The Witness, 2019 memoir

== Persecution in Nazi Germany ==
- King, Christine Elizabeth (1983), The Nazi State and the New Religions: Five Case Studies in Non-Conformity. ISBN 0-889-468656
- Yonan, Gabriele. Jehovah's Witnesses – Victims under Two German Dictatorships (1933-1945, 1949-1989). Numinos. 1999.
- Hesse, Hans, ed. (30 November 2002). Persecution and Resistance of Jehovah's Witnesses During the Nazi-Regime. Berghahn Books. ISBN 3861087502.
- Penton, James (2004). Jehovah's Witnesses and the Third Reich: Sectarian Politics Under Persecution. Toronto: University of Toronto Press. ISBN 0-8020-8678-0.
- Garbe, Detlef (2008). Between Resistance and Martyrdom: Jehovah's Witnesses in the Third Reich. Madison, Wisconsin: University of Wisconsin Press. ISBN 0-299-20794-3.
- Rammerstorfer, Bernhard (2013). Unbroken Will: The Extraordinary Courage of an Ordinary Man. XLIBRIS. 30 December 2013. ISBN 978-1493157815.
- Reynaud, Michel; Graffard, Sylvie (29 May 2001). The Jehovah's Witnesses and the Nazis: Persecution, Deportation, and Murder, 1933-1945. Cooper Square Press. ISBN 081541076X.

== Fiction ==
- McEwan, Ian (2004). The Children Act. Nan A. Talese. ISBN 978-0385539708.
- Mathenia, Anthony (2012). Paradise Earth: Day Zero. Curiosity Quills Press. ISBN 978-1620071434.
- LoveGrove, Jennifer (2013). Watch How We Walk. ECW Press. ISBN 978-1770411272.
- Apostasy (2017), British drama film
- You Can Live Forever (2022), Canadian lesbian romance
