= MacLean Gilmour =

Canadian New Testament scholar

- Born: 28 April 1905
- Died: 1970 (aged 64–65)

Academic background
- Education: Union Theological Seminary
- Thesis: The Rise of Church Consciousness Among Early Christians

Academic work
- Discipline: theology
- Institutions: Queen's Theological College; Andover Newton Theological School
- Main interests: Gospel According to Luke

Samuel MacLean Gilmour (28 April 1905 – 1970) was a Canadian New Testament scholar, professor at Queen's Theological College, Norris Professor of New Testament at Andover Newton Theological School, and President of the Canadian Society of Biblical Studies and of the Canadian Section of the Society of Biblical Literature and Exegesis. S. MacLean Gilmour also was member of the Editorial Committee of the Journal of Biblical Literature and a member of the Studiorum Novi Testamenti Societas.

== Contributions ==
=== Sources of the Gospel according to Luke ===
MacLean Gilmour proposed various theories about the sources that were used in the Gospel According to Luke. Gilmour "argued against Streeter and Taylor that Q+L constituted a complete Gospel and formed the structure upon which Luke the Evangelist composed his own Gospel." Gilmour added that even when Luke made Mark the basis of his own Gospel, in The passion narrative reviewed that material of his own Gospel and enriched it "with material of his own composition". Analyzing Gilmour's proposals and his antithesis, Xavier Léon-Dufour evaluated Gilmour's hypothesis as "brilliant among the criticism".

== Works ==
=== Thesis ===
- Gilmour, S. MacLean (1928). The Missionary Idea in the Old Testament (B.D.). New York, NY: Union Theological Seminary. OCLC 505316622.
- ——— (1937). The Rise of Church Consciousness Among Early Christians (Ph.D.). New York, NY: Union Theological Seminary. OCLC 12362864.

=== Books ===
- ——— (1952). The Gospel According to St. Luke. The Interpreter’s Bible. Vol. 8. Philadelphia, PA: Westminster Press. pp. 1–434.
- ——— (1957). The gospel Jesus preached. Philadelphia: Westminster Press. OCLC 2453216.
- ———; Williams, Daniel D. (1960). Christmas and Easter: message and meaning. Lebanon, PA: Sowers Print. Co. OCLC 55951535.
- ———; Schleiermacher, Friedrich; Verheyden, Jack C. (1975). The life of Jesus. Lives of Jesus Series. ISBN 9780800612726. OCLC 1923420.

=== Chapters ===
- ——— (1971). "The Revelation of John". The Interpreter's One-Volume Commentary on the Bible: Introduction and Commentary for Each Book of the Bible Including the Apocrypha; with General Articles. pp. 945–968.

=== Selected journal articles ===
- ——— (July 1938). "Church consciousness in the letters of Paul". The Journal of Religion. 18 (3): 289–302. doi:10.1086/482186. S2CID 170528485.
- ——— (1945). "Paul and the primitive church". The Journal of Religion. 25 (2): 119–128. doi:10.1086/483299. S2CID 170496111.
- ——— (January 1947). "Interpreting the Sermon on the Mount". Crozer Quarterly. XXIV (1): 47–56.
- ——— (1948). "A Critical Re-examination of Proto-Luke". Journal of Biblical Literature: 143–152.
- ——— (1953). "The Kingdom and the Church". Union Seminary Magazine. 7 (1): 26–33.
- ——— (1961). "The Christophany to more than five hundred brethren". Journal of Biblical Literature: 248–252.
- ——— (1962). "Easter and Pentecost". Journal of Biblical Literature: 62–66.

=== Translation ===
- Windisch, Hans (1950). The Meaning of the Sermon on the Mount. A contribution to the historical understanding of the Gospels and to the problem of their true exegesis. Translated by Gilmour, S. MacLean.
- Bultmann, Rudolf (July 1955). "The Transformation of the Idea of the Church in the History of Early Christianity". Canadian Journal of Theology. 1 (2). Translated by Gilmour, S. MacLean: 73–81.
- Kümmel, Werner Georg (1978). The New Testament: the history of the investigation of its problems. New Testament Library. Translated by Gilmour, S. MacLean; Kee, Howard Clark. London: SCM Press. ISBN 9780334010937. OCLC 638496506. - translation of the 1972 German title.
