= Criticism of Jehovah's Witnesses =

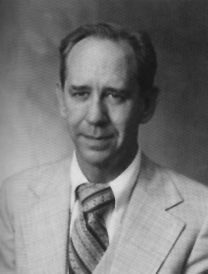
Raymond Franz (1922–2010), writer of Crisis of Conscience, former member of the Governing Body of Jehovah's Witnesses and critic of the institution

Jehovah's Witnesses have been criticized by adherents of mainstream Christianity, members of the medical community, former Jehovah's Witnesses, and commentators with regard to their beliefs and practices. The Jehovah's Witness movement's leaders have been accused of practicing doctrinal inconsistencies and making doctrinal reversals, making failed predictions, mistranslating the Bible, harshly treating former Jehovah's Witnesses, and leading the Jehovah's Witness movement in an authoritarian and coercive manner. Jehovah's Witnesses have also been criticized because they reject blood transfusions, even in life-threatening medical situations, and for failing to report cases of sexual abuse to the authorities. Many of the claims are denied by Jehovah's Witnesses and some have also been disputed by courts and religious scholars.

== Social criticisms ==
=== Authoritarianism and denial of free speech ===
Doctrines of Jehovah's Witnesses are established by the Governing Body, and the denomination does not tolerate dissent over doctrines and practices. Members who continue to openly disagree with the movement's teachings after initial warnings may be expelled and shunned. Witness publications strongly discourage followers from questioning doctrine and counsel received from the Governing Body, reasoning that it is to be trusted as part of "God's organization". They also warn members to "avoid independent thinking", claiming such thinking "was introduced by Satan the Devil" and would "cause division". Those who openly disagree with official teachings are condemned as "apostates" who are "mentally diseased".

Former Governing Body member Raymond Franz accused the movement's Governing Body of resenting, deprecating and seeking to silence alternative viewpoints within the organization and demanding organizational conformity that overrides personal conscience. He said the Watch Tower Society confirmed its position when, in a 1954 court case in Scotland, Watch Tower Society legal counsel Hayden C. Covington said of Jehovah's Witnesses: "We must have unity ... unity at all costs". He also stated that Witnesses are subject to a disciplinary system that encourages informants.

Franz and others have described Jehovah's Witnesses' meetings as "catechistical" question-and-answer sessions in which questions and answers are both provided by the organization, placing pressure on members to reiterate its opinions. Former Witnesses Heather and Gary Botting said Witnesses "are told what they should feel and think". Raymond Franz stated that members who do voice viewpoints different from those expressed in publications and at meetings are viewed with suspicion, and that most Witnesses would be fearful to voice criticism of the organization for fear of being accused of disloyalty.

Authors have drawn attention to frequent Watch Tower warnings against the "dangers" and "infection" of "independent thinking", including questioning any of its published statements or teachings, and instructions that members refrain from engaging in independent Bible research. The Watch Tower Society also directs that members must not read criticism of the organization by "apostates" or material published by other religious organizations. Heather and Gary Botting stated, "Jehovah's Witnesses will brook no criticism from within, as many concerned members who have attempted to voice alternative opinions regarding the basic doctrine or application of social pressure have discovered to their chagrin."

The Bottings argue that the power of the Watch Tower Society to control members is gained through the acceptance of the Society "quite literally as the voice of Jehovah—God's 'mouthpiece'". Franz also said the concept of loyalty to God's organization has no scriptural support and serves only to reinforce the movement's authority structure, with its strong emphasis on human authority. He said The Watchtower has repeatedly blurred discussions of both Jesus Christ's loyalty to God and the apostles' loyalty to Christ to promote the view that Witnesses should be loyal to the Watch Tower Society. Heather and Gary Botting said that challenging the views of members higher in the hierarchy is regarded as tantamount to challenging God himself.

The Watch Tower Society has described Jehovah's Witnesses' intolerance of dissident and divergent doctrinal views within its ranks as "strict", but claims its stance is based on the scriptural precedent of 2 Timothy 2:17, 18 in which the Apostle Paul condemns heretics Hymenaeus and Philetus who denied the resurrection of Jesus. It said: "Following such Scriptural patterns, if a Christian (who claims belief in God, the Bible, and Jesus) unrepentantly promotes false teachings, it may be necessary for him to be expelled from the congregation.... Hence, the true Christian congregation cannot rightly be accused of being harshly dogmatic."

Various associations of former members have been formed to highlight what they consider to be structural and institutionalized psychological abuses of Jehovah's Witness members and former members. Complaints include the control of adherents, marginalization, discrimination against women and sexual diversity, and attacks on other religious institutions. For example, the Spanish Association of Victims of Jehovah's Witnesses in Spain states that ostracism of former or disaffected members can lead to extreme loneliness, which can lead to severe depression or even suicide. They also state that Jehovah's Witnesses' system of congregational discipline have been used to investigate criminal matters, hiding or hindering reports of child abuse and rape. Former members from other Spanish-speaking countries have also created similar associations.

==== Comments of sociologists ====
Sociologist Rodney Stark says that Jehovah's Witness leaders are "not always very democratic" and members are expected to conform to "rather strict standards", but that enforcement tends to be informal, sustained by close bonds of friendship, and that Jehovah's Witnesses see themselves as "part of the power structure rather than subject to it". Sociologist James A. Beckford, however, states that the Watch Tower Society is intolerant of dissent or open discussion of doctrines and practices, and demands uniformity of beliefs from its members. He observed that the Society denies the legitimacy of all criticism of itself and that the habit of questioning official doctrine is "strenuously combated at all organizational levels". For similar reasons, Alan Rogerson describes the movement's leadership as totalitarian.

Dr. George D. Chryssides and Dr. James A. Beverley reported that Witness publications teach that individuals' consciences are unreliable and need to be subordinated to scripture and to the Watch Tower Society. Beverley describes the belief that organizational loyalty is equal to divine loyalty as the "central myth" of Jehovah's Witnesses employed to ensure complete obedience. Andrew Holden also observed that Witnesses see no distinction between loyalty to Jehovah and to the movement itself, and said that Witnesses are "under official surveillance" within the congregation. He noted that members who cannot conscientiously agree with all the movement's teachings are expelled and shunned. He also said that Witnesses are taught their theology in a highly mechanistic fashion, learning almost by rote.

=== Description as a cult ===
Authors Anthony A. Hoekema, Ron Rhodes and Alan W. Gomes claim Jehovah's Witnesses are a religious cult. Hoekema bases his judgment on a range of what he describes as general characteristics of a cult, including the tendency to elevate peripheral teachings (such as door-to-door preaching) to great prominence, extra-scriptural source of authority (Hoekema highlights Watch Tower teachings that the Bible may be understood only as it is interpreted by the Governing Body), a view of the group as the exclusive community of the saved (Watch Tower publications teach that Witnesses alone are God's people and only they will survive Armageddon) and the group's central role in eschatology (Hoekema says Witness publications claim the group was called into existence by God to fill in a gap in the truth neglected by existing churches, marking the climax of sacred history).

Jehovah's Witnesses state that they are not a cult and say that although individuals need proper guidance from God, they should do their own thinking.

In 1992, American religious scholar J. Gordon Melton placed the Jehovah's Witnesses denomination in a list of "established cults". However, he and others have since been more reluctant to use the term "cult" for various groups, including Jehovah's Witnesses, because the term is considered too controversial. Ex-cult watchdog John Bowen Brown II and Knocking producer Joel P. Engardio also reject the assertion that Jehovah's Witnesses is a cult. The encyclopedia Contemporary American Religion stated, "Various critics and ex-members in recent years have wrongly labeled Jehovah's Witnesses a 'cult'."

=== Coercion ===
Since 1920, the Watch Tower Society has required all congregation members participating in the preaching work to turn in written reports of the amount of their activity, explaining that the reports help the Society to plan its activities and identify areas of greater need and help congregation elders to identify those who may need assistance. In 1943, the Society imposed personal quotas, requiring all active Witnesses to spend at least 60 hours of door-to-door preaching per month, claiming these were "directions from the Lord". Although these quotas were subsequently removed, Raymond Franz claims "invisible" quotas remained, obliging Witnesses to meet certain levels of preaching work to remain in good standing in the congregation or to qualify for eldership. Franz describes repeated urging for adherents to "put kingdom interests first" and devote increasing amounts of time to door-to-door preaching efforts as coercive pressure. He says many Witnesses constantly feel guilty that they are not doing more in "field activity".

Former Witnesses Heather and Gary Botting, claiming an emphasis on a personal track record would mean that salvation is effectively being "bought" with "good works", observed: "No matter how long a Witness remains an active distributor of literature, the moment he ceases to be active he is regarded by his peers as good as dead in terms of achieving the ultimate goal of life everlasting in an earthly paradise.... Few realize upon entering the movement that the purchase price is open-ended and that the bill can never be paid in full until death or the advent of Armageddon."

The Watchtower, however, noted that although public preaching is necessary, such works do not "save" a Christian and it urged Witnesses to examine their motive for engaging in preaching activity.

According to Andrew Holden, "those who fail to devote a satisfactory amount of time to doorstep evangelism soon lose the respect of their co-religionists. The Witnesses are thus forced to think quantitatively about their salvation."

Medical and legal commentators have noted cases, claiming that Witness medical patients were coerced to obey the denomination's ban on blood transfusions. According to Osamu Muramoto, in the Journal of Medical Ethics, those who unrepentantly receive prohibited blood products are labeled "apostates", expelled, and shunned by other Jehovah's Witness friends or family members. He also states that "there is considerable documentation that [Jehovah's Witnesses] can be subject to psychological coercion".

In a case involving a review of a Russian district court decision, the European Court of Human Rights found nothing in the judgements to suggest that any form of improper pressure or undue influence was applied. It noted: "On the contrary, it appears that many Jehovah's Witnesses have made a deliberate choice to refuse blood transfusions in advance, free from time constraints of an emergency situation." The court said: "The freedom to accept or refuse specific medical treatment, or to select an alternative form of treatment, is vital to the principles of self-determination and personal autonomy. A competent adult patient is free to decide ... not to have a blood transfusion. However, for this freedom to be meaningful, patients must have the right to make choices that accord with their own views and values, regardless of how irrational, unwise or imprudent such choices may appear to others." The court also stated that, "even though the Jehovah's Witnesses whose opposition to blood transfusions was cited in evidence were adults having legal capacity to refuse that form of treatment, the findings of the Russian courts can be understood to mean that their refusals had not been an expression of their true will but rather the product of pressure exerted on them by the applicant community. The Court accepts that, given that health and possibly life itself are at stake in such situations, the authenticity of the patient's refusal of medical treatment is a legitimate concern."

=== Shunning ===
Jehovah's Witnesses are instructed to shun members who unrepentantly engage in "gross sin" (most commonly for breaches of the Witnesses' code of personal morality), and "remorseless apostasy". The process is said to uphold God's standards, preserve the congregation's spiritual cleanness, and possibly prompt a change of attitude in the wrongdoer. The practice requires that the expelled person be shunned by all members of the group, including family members who do not live in the same home, unless they qualify for re-admission. Expelled individuals cannot be given a funeral at a Kingdom Hall. Members often face difficulties and trauma once expelled because of their previously limited contact with the outside world. A 2021 qualitative psychological research study of interviews with former Jehovah's Witnesses suggested their experiences of ostracism from their family and friends can be associated with increased mental health risks. The Watchtower's description of those who leave as being "mentally diseased" has drawn criticism from some current and former members; in Britain some have argued that the description may constitute a breach of laws regarding religious hatred.

The Watch Tower Society has attracted criticism for shunning individuals who decide they cannot conscientiously agree with all the denomination's teachings and practices. Sociologist Andrew Holden says that because the group provides no valid reason for leaving, those who do choose to leave are regarded as traitors. According to Raymond Franz, those who decide they cannot accept Watch Tower teachings and practices often live in a climate of fear, feeling they must constantly be on guard about what they say, do and read. He says those who do express any disagreement, even in a private conversation with friends, risk investigation and trial by a judicial committee as apostates or heretics and classed as "wicked".

Franz argues that the threat of expulsion for expressing disagreement with the Watch Tower Society's teachings is designed to create a sterile atmosphere in which the organization's teachings and policies can circulate without the risk of confronting serious questioning or adverse evidence. The result, according to Holden, is that individuals may spend most of their lives suppressing doubts for fear of losing their relationships with friends and relatives. Penton describes the system of judicial committees and the threat of expulsion as the ultimate control mechanism among the Witnesses; Holden claims that shunning not only rids the community of defilement, but deters others from dissident behavior. Sociologist Ronald Lawson has also noted that the group allows little room for independence of thought, and no toleration of doctrinal diversity. He said those who deviate from official teachings are readily expelled and shunned.

Watch Tower Society publications defend the practice of expelling and shunning those who "promote false teaching", claiming such individuals must be quarantined to prevent the spread of their "spiritual infection". They have cited a dictionary definition of apostasy ("renunciation of a religious faith, abandonment of a previous loyalty") to rule that an individual who begins affiliating with another religious organization has disassociated from the Witnesses, warranting their shunning to protect the spiritual cleanness of the Witness congregation on the basis of the reference in 1 John 2:19 that those who leave Christianity are "not of our sort". An individual's acceptance of a blood transfusion is similarly deemed as evidence of disassociation. They say Witnesses also obey the "strong counsel" at 1 Corinthians 5:11 that Christians should "quit mixing in company" with people who unrepentantly reject certain scriptural standards.

The Witnesses' judicial process has also been criticized. Hearings take place in secret, with judicial committees filling the roles of judge, jury and prosecutor. According to Franz, witnesses may present evidence but are not permitted to remain for the discussion. Critics Heather and Gary Botting have claimed that Witnesses accused of an offence warranting expulsion are presumed guilty until found innocent. They say the onus is on the accused to prove their innocence and if they make no attempt to do so—by failing to appear at a hearing set by the judicial committee—they are assumed to be guilty and unrepentant.

When a decision is made regarding expulsion, an announcement is made that the person is "no longer one of Jehovah's Witnesses" without any elaboration, at which point shunning is immediate. Neither testimony nor evidence in support of the judicial decision are provided. Congregation members are told to accept the rulings without question and Witnesses who refuse to abide by the decision may themselves suffer expulsion. Members are forbidden to talk with the expelled member, removing any opportunity for the person to discuss or explain their actions. Penton claims judicial committee members and the Watch Tower Society frequently ignore established procedures when dealing with troublesome individuals, conspiring to have them expelled in violation of Society rules. Critics claim that Witness policies encourage an informer system to report to elders Witnesses suspected of having committed an act that could warrant expulsion, including deviating from organizational policies and teachings.

Criticism has also been directed at the 1981 change of policy that directed that persons who disassociate from (formally leave) the group were to be treated as though they were disfellowshipped. Holden says that as a result, those who do leave are seldom allowed a dignified exit. Heather and Gary Botting claim inactive Witnesses are often pressured to either become active or to disassociate themselves by declaring they no longer accept key Watch Tower Society doctrines.

=== Blood ===
Jehovah's Witnesses reject transfusions of whole allogenic blood and its primary components (red blood cells, white blood cells, platelets and plasma), and transfusions of stored autologous blood or its primary components. As a doctrine, Jehovah's Witnesses do not reject transfusion of whole autologous blood so long as it is not stored prior to surgery (e.g. peri-operative extraction and transfusion of autologous blood). This religious position is due to their belief that blood is sacred and represents life in God's eyes. Jehovah's Witnesses understand scriptures such as Leviticus 17:10–14 (which speaks of not eating blood) and Acts 15:29 ("abstain from blood") to include taking blood into the body via a transfusion. Controversy has stemmed, however, from what critics state are inconsistencies in Witness policies on blood, claims that Witness patients are coerced into refusing blood and that Watch Tower literature distorts facts about transfusions and fails to provide information that would allow Witnesses to make an informed decision on the issue.

==== Fractions and components ====
In the case of minor fractions derived from blood, each individual is directed to follow their own conscience on whether these are acceptable. Consequently, some Jehovah's Witnesses accept the use of blood fractions and others do not. However, fractions that carry out "the key function of a primary component" or make up "a significant portion of that component" are not permitted.

Such a stance of dividing blood into major components and minor fractions rather than either accepting all blood or requiring all blood components to be poured out onto the ground has led to criticism from organizations such as the Associated Jehovah's Witnesses for Reform on Blood. Witnesses respond that blood as the fluid per se is not the real issue. They say the real issue is respect and obedience regarding blood, which they perceive as being God's personal property. Members are allowed to eat meat that still contains small traces of blood remaining. Once blood is drained from an animal, the respect has been shown to God and then a person can eat the meat. Jehovah's Witnesses view of meat and blood is therefore different from the Jewish view that goes to great lengths to remove even minor traces of blood.

According to lawyer Kerry Louderback-Wood, a former Jehovah's Witness, the Watch Tower Society misrepresents the scope of allowed fractions. If taken together, they "total the entire volume of blood they came from". An example of this can be seen in blood plasma, which consists of 90–96% water. The remaining amount consists mainly of albumin, globulins, fibrinogen and coagulation factors. These four fractions are allowable for use, but only if taken separately. Raymond Franz has likened this to banning the eating of a ham and cheese sandwich but allowing the eating of bread, ham and cheese separately.

==== Storing and donation ====
Jehovah's Witnesses believe that storing blood violates direction from the Bible to 'pour blood out onto the ground'. They do not donate blood except for uses they have individually pre-approved. However, they are told that acceptance of blood fractions from donated blood is a matter of conscience. A 2006 issue of Jehovah's Witnesses' newsletter Our Kingdom Ministry stated, "Although [Jehovah's Witnesses] do not donate or store their own blood for transfusion purposes, some procedures or tests involving an individual's blood are not so clearly in conflict with Bible principles. Therefore, each individual should make a conscientious decision" [emphasis added]. Raymond Franz has challenged these policies because acceptable blood fractions can only be derived from stored blood provided by donors.

==== Legal considerations ====
Regardless of the medical considerations, Jehovah Witnesses advocate that physicians should uphold the right of a patient to choose what treatments they do or do not accept (though a Witness is subject to religious sanctions if they exercise their right to choose a blood transfusion). Accordingly, US courts tend not to hold physicians responsible for adverse health effects that a patient incurred out of his or her own requests. However, the point of view that physicians must, in all circumstances, abide by the religious wishes of the patients is not acknowledged by all jurisdictions, such as was determined in a case involving Jehovah's Witnesses in France.

The situation has been controversial, particularly in the case of children. In the United States, many physicians will agree to explore and exhaust all non-blood alternatives in the treatment of children at the request of their legal guardians. Some state laws require physicians to administer blood-based treatment to minors if it is their professional opinion that it is necessary to prevent immediate death or severe permanent damage.

Even when an adult's life is at stake, some philosophers argue that since blood refusal is based on irrational beliefs, the patient's decision may be challenged.

Kerry Louderback-Wood has claimed that Jehovah's Witnesses' legal corporations are potentially liable to significant claims for compensation if the organization misrepresents the medical risks of blood transfusions. Wood claims that constitutional guarantees of freedom of religion do not remove the legal responsibility that every person or organization has regarding misrepresenting secular fact.

==== Animal blood ====
The Watchtower has stated that "Various medical products have been obtained from biological sources, either animal or human.... Such commercialization of ... blood is hardly tempting for true Christians, who guide their thinking by God's perfect law. Our Creator views blood as sacred, representing God-given life ... blood removed from a creature was to be poured out on the ground, disposed of."

=== Reporting of sexual abuse ===
Former Jehovah's Witness Bill Bowen, founder of Silentlambs, accuses Jehovah's Witnesses of employing organizational policies of not reporting sexual abuse cases to authorities to protect the organization's reputation. The Ontario Consultants on Religious Tolerance stated that the consequence of keeping the cases secrets is that "there is a very high probability that the abuse will continue." Some victims of sexual abuse have asserted that when reporting abuse they were ordered to maintain silence by their local elders to avoid embarrassment to both the accused and the organization.

The movement's official policy on child protection, which discusses the procedures for reporting child sexual abuse, states that elders obey all legal requirements for reporting sex offenders, including reporting uncorroborated or unsubstantiated allegations where required by law. Elders are to discipline pedophiles in the congregation. Victims are permitted to notify the authorities if they wish to do so.

While a Witness may lose congregation privileges following a single credible accusation of abuse, Jehovah's Witnesses claim to be scripturally obliged to require corroboration before applying their severest forms of congregational discipline. If there is not an actual second witness to an incident of abuse, a congregation judicial committee will accept medical or police reports, or a witness to a separate but similar incident as such a second witness against a member accused of sexual abuse.

=== Views on mental health ===
Jehovah's Witnesses have been criticized for traditionally viewing mental illness as a symptom of spiritual weakness or a sign of Satan's influence, which implies that they may prefer the guidance of elders to psychiatric and psychological treatment. They may also hesitate to seek help from mental health professionals because of their tendency to avoid relationships with people outside the denomination. However, in recent years the Watch Tower Society has acknowledged that "mental-health professionals can treat many mental-health disorders successfully" and recommended that readers "follow the treatment prescribed by qualified mental-health professionals."

Increased mental health risks among Jehovah's Witnesses may be associated with the authoritarian nature of the organization, internal handling of physical and sexual abuse allegations, and the treatment of sexuality and homosexuality as sin. The patriarchal attitudes and organizational structures of the denomination may also contribute to mental health issues. Various mental health professionals have also noted the negative impact of the practice of shunning of those who are expelled or who voluntary leave the denomination.

No study shows a direct positive correlation between membership of Jehovah's Witnesses and the propensity to develop mental disorders, although that hypothesis has occasionally surfaced in medical and psychological literature and in anti-cult movement literature.

=== Homophobia ===
Homophobia—aversion, discrimination or fear of LGBTQ individuals and communities—is a social issue prevalent in many Christian churches and specifically within Jehovah's Witnesses. In The Journal of Homosexuality, Dr. Janja Lalich considers the impact that the Jehovah's Witnesses denomination has on LGBTQ communities by highlighting intolerance in the organization's teachings. Lalich shows that the organization treats homosexuality as a form of sexual misconduct and instructs its members to suppress same-sex attraction or activity, while preaching that homosexuality is a choice that can be rejected.

A Jehovah's Witness member who engages in homosexual activity may be subject to excommunication and shunning, resulting in separation from family and potential for a variety of mental health issues. Professor Chris Greenough, in the journal Sexualities, considers the impact of shunning on former Jehovah's Witnesses who are part of the LGBTQ community. Greenough posits that LGBTQ individuals expelled from Jehovah's Witnesses due to their sexual orientation usually struggle with reconciling their sexuality with their spirituality as a consequence of associating sexual nonconformity with sin.

== Activist groups ==
=== JZ Help Association ===
The JZ Help association is a non-profit organization located in Germany, Austria, Switzerland and Italy. It reports on what it considers to constitute "human rights violations" within the Jehovah's Witnesses organization, and offers psychological and legal support to people who wish to leave the denomination. It also aims to protect family relationships against discrimination or exclusion when leaving the religion.

In 2015, Jehovah's Witnesses in Switzerland denounced cult expert Dr. Regina Spiess for "defamation" following a press release and an interview in Tages-Anzeiger. In July 2019, the Zurich District Court acquitted Spiess. The cult expert received legal compensation of 20,500 francs, and personal compensation of 4,000 francs.

=== Spanish Association of Victims of Jehovah's Witnesses ===
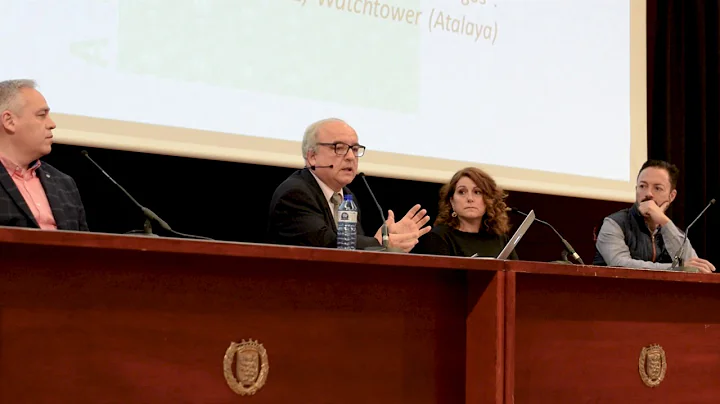
The Spanish Association of Victims of Jehovah's Witnesses, in its first public presentation in 2019, at the 5th National Meeting on Sects, organized by the Ibero-American Association for the Investigation of Psychological Abuse (AIIAP) in Zaragoza, Spain

The Spanish Association of Victims of Jehovah's Witnesses (AEVTJ) was founded in Spain in 2019 by former members of the denomination. The association denounces the denomination for what it considers structural and institutionalized psychological abuse by Jehovah's Witnesses. The association was registered with the National Registry of Associations of the Ministry of the Interior.

The association investigates complaints about authoritarian control, marginalization, discrimination against women, sexual discrimination (for example, homophobia and transphobia), and Jehovah's Witnesses' criticism of other religious institutions. The association notes that ostracism practiced by Jehovah's Witnesses can lead to extreme loneliness in former members, particularly due to having close relationships only within the denomination from a young age, and that in some cases this may lead to depression or suicide. The association also accuses the denomination of carrying out its own judicial system parallel to those of the state, and of hiding or hindering reports of child abuse and rape. The association's website states:

In Spain, more and more, we former followers dare to publicly denounce their coercive practices, which range from the emotional and personal pressure of their followers, lack of dignity, the right to honor and privacy, through ostracism, to the defense of an unappealable truth that violates the rights and dignity of women and other groups of sexual diversity.

In response to the association's activities, Jehovah's Witnesses in Spain filed several lawsuits against members of the AEVTJ, which are ongoing.

=== Argentine Association of Victims of Jehovah's Witnesses ===
The Argentine Association of Victims of Jehovah's Witnesses (AAVTJ) was founded in Argentina as part of an international initiative to call attention to complaints of economic fraud and the cover-up of sexual abuse by the Jehovah's Witnesses organization. On July 26, 2023, the association held a 'Memorial Day' in Buenos Aires in memory of 'victims of the Watchtower', denouncing practices of Jehovah's Witnesses that the association considers coercive.

=== Ibero-American Network for the Study of Sects ===
The Ibero-American Network for the Study of Sects (RIES) was formed in 2005 by Spanish and Ibero-American Catholics, experts and scholars studying sects and new religious movements, including Jehovah's Witnesses.

=== LIBERADOS Association ===
The LIBERADOS Association was formed in Spain in 2009 to help people "affected by the sectarian doctrines of Jehovah's Witnesses", focusing on Jehovah's Witnesses' interpretations of various biblical texts, and potentially harmful impacts—such as opposition to blood transfusions—that the Jehovah's Witnesses denomination may have on its members.

== Doctrinal criticisms ==
=== Failed predictions ===
Central to Jehovah's Witnesses' beliefs are their interpretations of the second coming of Christ, the millennium and the kingdom of God. Watch Tower Society publications have made, and continue to make, predictions about world events they believe were prophesied in the Bible. Some of those early predictions were described as "established truth", and beyond any doubt. Witnesses are told to "be complete in accepting the visible organization's direction in every aspect" and that there is no need to question what God tells them through his Word and organization since love "believes all things". If a member advocates views different from what appears in print, they face expulsion.

Failed predictions that were either explicitly stated or strongly implied, particularly linked to dates in 1914, 1915, 1918, 1925 and 1975, have led to the alteration or abandonment of some teachings. The Society's publications have at times suggested that members had previously "read into the Watch Tower statements that were never intended" or that the beliefs of members were "based on wrong premises". According to Professor Edmond Gruss, other failed predictions were ignored, and replaced with new predictions; for example, in the book, The Finished Mystery (1917), events were applied to the years 1918 to 1925 that earlier had been held to occur prior to 1914. When the new interpretations also did not transpire, the 1926 edition of the book changed the statements and removed the dates.

Raymond Franz, a former member of the Governing Body of Jehovah's Witnesses, has cited publications that claimed God has used Jehovah's Witnesses as a collective prophet. Professor James A. Beverley, along with others, has accused the movement of false prophecy for making those predictions, particularly because of assertions in some cases that the predictions were beyond doubt or had been approved by God, but describes its record of telling the future as "pathetic". Beverley says the Watch Tower Society has passed judgment on others who have falsely predicted the end of the world (he cites a 1968 Awake! article that says other groups were "guilty of false prophesying" after having "predicted an 'end to the world', even announcing a specific date").

The Watch Tower Society rejects accusations that it is a false prophet. It admits its explanations of Bible prophecy are not infallible and that its predictions are not claimed explicitly as "the words of Jehovah". It states that some of its expectations have needed adjustment because of eagerness for God's kingdom, but that those adjustments are no reason to "call into question the whole body of truth". Raymond Franz claims that the Watch Tower Society tries to evade its responsibility when citing human fallibility as a defense, adding that the Society represents itself as God's appointed spokesman, and that throughout its history has made many emphatic predictions. Franz adds that the organization's eagerness for the Millennium does not give it license to impugn the motives of those who fail to accept its predictions.

George D. Chryssides has suggested widespread claims that Witnesses "keep changing the dates" are a distortion and misunderstanding of Watch Tower Society chronology. He argues that, although there have been failures in prophetic speculation, the changing views and dates of the Jehovah's Witnesses are more largely attributable to changed understandings of biblical chronology than to failed predictions. Chryssides states, "For the Jehovah's Witnesses prophecy serves more as a way of discerning a divine plan in human history than a means to predicting the future."

Predictions (by date of publication) include:

- 1877: Christ's kingdom would hold full sway over the earth in 1914; the Jews, as a people, would be restored to God's favor; the "saints" would be carried to heaven.
- 1891: 1914 would be "the farthest limit of the rule of imperfect men".
- 1904: "World-wide anarchy" would follow the end of the Gentile Times in 1914.
- 1916: World War I would terminate in Armageddon and the rapture of the "saints".
- 1917: In 1918, Christendom would go down as a system to oblivion and be succeeded by revolutionary governments. God would "destroy the churches wholesale and the church members by the millions". Church members would "perish by the sword of war, revolution and anarchy". The dead would lie unburied. In 1920 all earthly governments would disappear, with worldwide anarchy prevailing.
- 1920: Messiah's kingdom would be established in 1925 and bring worldwide peace. God would begin restoring the earth. Abraham, Isaac, Jacob and other faithful patriarchs would be resurrected to perfect human life and be made princes and rulers, the visible representatives of the New Order on earth. Those who showed themselves obedient to God would never die.
- 1922: The anti-typical "jubilee" that would mark God's intervention in earthly affairs would take place "probably the fall" of 1925.
- 1925: God's restoration of Earth would begin "shortly after" October 1, 1925. Jerusalem would be made the world's capital. Resurrected "princes" such as Abel, Noah, Moses and John the Baptist would give instructions to their subjects around the world by radio, and airplanes would transport people to and from Jerusalem from all parts of the globe in just "a few hours".
- 1938: Armageddon was too close for marriage or child bearing.
- 1941: There were only "months" remaining until Armageddon.
- 1942: Armageddon was "immediately before us".
- 1952: Most people who had also been alive in 1914 would not have the chance to live out their natural lives; "the lives of the majority of them will be cut short by Armageddon".
- 1957: Armageddon was so near that "most of the boys and girls today will not have the opportunity to waste their youth and prime of life ... According to God's timing the calamity of the universal war of Armageddon will strike them down while yet in their youth and prime of life."
- 1961: Awake! magazine stated that Armageddon "will come in the twentieth century.... This generation will see its fulfillment."
- 1966: It would be 6000 years since man's creation in the fall of 1975 and it would be "appropriate" for Christ's thousand-year reign to begin at that time. Time was "running out, no question about that". The "immediate future" was "certain to be filled with climactic events ... within a few years at most", the final parts of Bible prophecy relating to the "last days" would undergo fulfillment as Christ's reign began.
- 1967: The end-time period (beginning in 1914) was claimed to be so far advanced that the time remaining could "be compared, not just to the last day of a week, but rather, to the last part of that day".
- 1968: No one could say "with certainty" that the battle of Armageddon would begin in 1975, but time was "running out rapidly" with "earthshaking events" soon to take place. In March 1968 there was a "short period of time left", with "only about ninety months left before 6000 years of man's existence on earth is completed".
- 1969: The existing world order would not last long enough for young people to grow old; the world system would end "in a few years". Young Witnesses were told not to bother pursuing tertiary education for this reason.
- 1971: The "battle in the day of Jehovah" was described as beginning "[s]hortly, within our twentieth century".
- 1974: There was just a "short time remaining before the wicked world's end" and Witnesses were commended for selling their homes and property to "finish out the rest of their days in this old system in the pioneer service" (i.e., fulltime evangelism).
- 1980: Watchtower magazine described the notion that "the wicked system of this world" would last "until the turn of the century" as "highly improbable in view of world trends and the fulfillment of Bible prophecy".
- 1984: There were "many indications" that "the end" was closer than the end of the 20th century.
- 1989: The Watchtower asserted that Christian missionary work begun in the first century would "be completed in our 20th century". When the magazine was republished in bound volumes, the phrase "in our 20th century" was replaced with the less specific "in our day".

=== Changes of doctrine ===
History of Eschatological Doctrine
	Last Days begin	Start of Christ's Presence	Christ made King	Resurrection of 144,000	Judgment of Religion	Separating Sheep & Goats	Great Tribulation
1879–1920	1799	1874	1878			during Millennium	1914, 1915, 1918, 1920
1920–1923	1799	1874	1914	1878	1878	during Millennium	1925
1923–1925	1799	1874	1914	1878	1878	during Christ's presence	1925
1925–1927	1799	1874	1914	1878	1878	during Christ's presence	within generation of 1914
1927–1929	1799	1874	1914	1918	1878	during Christ's presence	within generation of 1914
1929–1930	1914	1874	1914	1918	1878	during Christ's presence	within generation of 1914
1930–1966	1914			1918	1919	during Christ's presence	within generation of 1914
1966–1975	1914			1918	1919	during Christ's presence	1975?
1975–1995	1914			1918	1919	during Christ's presence	within generation of 1914
1995–present	1914			1918	1919	during Great Tribulation	imminent

Although Watch Tower Society literature claims the Society's founder, Charles Taze Russell, was directed by God's Holy Spirit, through which he received "flashes of light", it has substantially altered doctrines since its inception and abandoned many of Russell's teachings. Many of the changes have involved biblical chronology that had earlier been claimed as beyond question. The Watch Tower asserted in 1922: "We affirm that Scripturally, scientifically, and historically, present-truth chronology is correct beyond a doubt." (italics in original). Watch Tower Society publications state that doctrinal changes result from a process of "progressive revelation", in which God gradually reveals his will.

- Date of beginning of Christ's kingdom rule. Russell taught that Jesus had become king in April 1878. In 1920, the Watch Tower Society altered the date to 1914.
- Date of resurrection of anointed Christians. After the failure of predictions that Christ's chosen "saints" would be carried away to heaven in 1878, Russell developed the teaching that those "dying in the Lord" from 1878 forward would have an immediate heavenly resurrection. The Watch Tower confirmed the doctrine in 1925, but two years later asserted this date was wrong and that the beginning of the instant resurrection to heaven for faithful Christians was from 1918.
- Identity of "faithful and wise servant". Russell initially believed the "faithful and wise servant" of Matthew 24:45 was "every member of this body of Christ ... the whole body individually and collectively". By 1886 he had altered his view and began explaining it was a person, not the Christian church. Russell accepted claims by Bible Students that he was that "servant" and in 1909 described as his "opponents" those who would apply the term "faithful and wise servant" to "all the members of the church of Christ" rather than to an individual. By 1927 the Watch Tower Society was teaching that it was "a collective servant".
- Great Pyramid as a "stone witness" of God. Russell wrote in 1910 that God had the Great Pyramid of Giza in Egypt built as a testimony to the truth of the Bible and proof of its chronology identifying the "last days". In 1928 The Watch Tower rejected the doctrine and claimed the Pyramid had been built under the direction of Satan.
- Beginning of the "last days". From the earliest issues of the Watch Tower, Russell promoted the belief that the "last days" had begun in 1799 and would end in 1914. As late as 1927 and 1928 Watch Tower publications were still claiming the last days had begun in 1799. Then in 1929, the beginning of the last days was changed to 1914.
- Date of Christ's invisible presence. From 1879 until 1929, the Watch Tower Society taught that Jesus 'presence' had begun in 1874, stating in 1922 that the selection of 1874 was "indisputable". In 1930 the Society moved the event to 1914.
- Jews' role in God's Kingdom. Russell followed the view of Nelson H. Barbour, who believed that in 1914 Christ's kingdom would take power over all the earth and the Jews, as a people, would be restored to God's favor. In 1889 Russell wrote that with the completion of the "Gentile Times" in 1914, Israel's "blindness" would subside and they would convert to Christianity. The book Life (1929) noted that the return of Jews to Palestine signaled that the end was very close, because Jews would "have the favors first and thereafter all others who obey the Lord" under God's restoration of his kingdom. In 1932 that belief was abandoned and from that date the Watch Tower Society taught that Witnesses alone were the Israel of God.
- Identity of the "superior authorities". Russell taught that the "superior authorities" of Romans 13:1, to whom Christians had to show subjection and obedience, were governmental authorities. In 1929 The Watch Tower discarded this view, stating that the term referred only to God and Christ, and saying the change of doctrine was evidence of "advancing light" of truth shining forth to God's chosen people. In 1952, The Watchtower stated that the words of Romans 13 "could never have applied to the political powers of Caesar's world as wrongly claimed by the clergy of Christendom", and in 1960 The Watchtower described the earlier view as a factor that had caused the Bible Student movement to be "unclean" in God's eyes during the 1914–1918 period. Two years later, in 1962, The Watchtower reverted to Russell's initial doctrine.
- Identity and function of the Governing Body. Frequent mentions of the term "Governing Body" began in Watch Tower Society literature in the 1970s. The Governing Body was initially identified as the Watch Tower Society's seven-member board of directors. However, at the time, the board played no role in establishing Watchtower doctrines, and all such decisions since the Society's origins had been made by the Society's president. A 1923 Watch Tower noted that Russell alone directed the policy and course of the Society "without regard to any other person on earth" and both his successors, Rutherford and Knorr, also acted alone in establishing Watch Tower doctrines. An organizational change on January 1, 1976, for the first time gave the Governing Body the power to rule on doctrines and become the ruling council of Jehovah's Witnesses. Despite this, The Watchtower in 1971 claimed that a Governing Body of anointed Christians had existed since the 19th century to govern the affairs of God's anointed people.
- Treatment of disfellowshipped persons. In the 1950s when disfellowshipping became common, Witnesses were to have nothing to do with expelled members, not conversing with or acknowledging them. Family members of expelled individuals were permitted occasional "contacts absolutely necessary in matters pertaining to family interests", but could not discuss spiritual matters with them. In 1974 The Watchtower, acknowledging some unbalanced Witnesses had displayed unkind, inhumane and possibly cruel attitudes to those expelled, relaxed restrictions on family contact, allowing families to choose for themselves the extent of association, including whether or not to discuss some spiritual matters. In 1981, a reversal of policy occurred, with Witnesses instructed to avoid all spiritual interaction with disfellowshipped ones, including with close relatives. Witnesses were instructed not to greet disfellowshipped persons. Parents were permitted to care for the physical needs of a disfellowshipped minor child; ill parents or physically or emotionally ill child could be accepted back into the home "for a time". Witnesses were instructed not to eat with disfellowshipped relatives and were warned that emotional influence could soften their resolve. In 1980 the Witnesses' Brooklyn headquarters advised traveling overseers that a person need not be promoting "apostate views" to warrant disfellowshipping; it advised that "appropriate judicial action" be taken against a person who "continues to believe the apostate ideas and rejects what he has been provided" through The Watchtower. The rules on shunning were extended in 1981 to include those who had resigned from the group voluntarily. In 2024, the leadership replaced the term disfellowshipping with removal from the congregation, and decided that members may invite shunned individuals to congregation meetings or offer brief greetings at meetings, unless the individual is deemed to be an apostate.
- Fall of "Babylon the Great". Russell taught that the fall of the "world empire of false religion" had taken place in 1878 and predicted "Babylon's" complete destruction in 1914. The Society claimed in 1917 that religion's final destruction would take place in 1918, explaining that God would destroy churches "wholesale" and that "Christendom shall go down as a system to oblivion." In 1988 the Watch Tower Society claimed that release from prison in 1919 of senior Watchtower figures marked the fall of Babylon "as far as having any captive hold on God's people was concerned", with her "final destruction" "into oblivion, never to recover", expected "in the near future".

=== United Nations association ===
Jehovah's Witnesses believe that the United Nations is one of the 'superior authorities' that exist by God's permission, and that it serves a purpose in maintaining order, but do not support it politically and do not consider it to be the means to achieve peace and security. Jehovah's Witnesses also believe that the United Nations is the "image of the wild beast" of Revelation 13:1–18, and the second fulfilment of the "abominable thing that causes desolation" from Matthew 24:15; that it will be the means for the devastation of organized false religion worldwide; and that, like all other political powers, it will be destroyed and replaced by God's heavenly kingdom. Jehovah's Witnesses have denounced other religious organizations for having offered political support to the UN.

On October 8, 2001, an article was published in the British Guardian newspaper questioning the Watch Tower Bible and Tract Society's registration as a non-governmental organization (NGO) with the United Nations Department of Public Information and accusing the Watch Tower Society of hypocrisy. Within days of the article's publication, the Watch Tower Bible and Tract Society submitted a formal request for disassociation, removing all association with the United Nations Department of Public Information, and released a letter stating that the reason for becoming associated with the United Nations Department of Information (DPI) was to access their facilities, and that they had not been aware of the change in language contained in the criteria for NGO association. However, when the Watch Tower Society sought NGO association, "the organization agreed to meet criteria for association, including support and respect of the principles of the Charter of the United Nations", acknowledging that the purpose of membership is to "promote knowledge of the principles and activities of the United Nations".

=== Fall of Jerusalem ===
Jehovah's Witnesses assert that Jerusalem was destroyed by the Babylonians in 607 BC and completely uninhabited for exactly seventy years. This date is critical to their selection of October 1914 for the arrival of Christ in kingly power—2520 years after October 607 BC. Non-Witness sources do not support 607 BC for the event, placing the destruction of Jerusalem within a year of 587 BC, twenty years later. Jehovah's Witnesses believe that periods of seventy years mentioned in the books of Jeremiah and Daniel refer to the Babylonian exile of Jews. They also believe that the gathering of Jews in Jerusalem, shortly after their return from Babylon, officially ended the exile in the Jewish month of Tishrei. According to the Watch Tower Society, October 607 BC is derived by counting back seventy years from Tishrei of 537 BC, based on its assertion that Cyrus' decree to release the Jews during his first regnal year "may have been made in late 538 B.C. or before March 4–5, 537 B.C". Secular sources assign the return to either 538 BC or 537 BC.

In The Gentile Times Reconsidered: Chronology & Christ's Return, Carl O. Jonsson, a former Witness, presents eighteen lines of evidence to support the traditional view of neo-Babylonian chronology. He accuses the Watch Tower Society of deliberately misquoting sources in an effort to bolster its position. The Watch Tower Society claims that biblical chronology is not always compatible with secular sources, and that the Bible is superior. It claims that secular historians make conclusions about 587 BC based on incorrect or inconsistent historical records, but accepts those sources that identify Cyrus' capture of Babylon in 539 BC, claiming it has no evidence of being inconsistent and hence can be used as a pivotal date.

While a member of the denomination, Rolf Furuli, a former lecturer in Semitic languages, presented a study of 607 BC in support of Jehovah's Witnesses' conclusions in Assyrian, Babylonian, Egyptian, and Persian Chronology Compared with the Chronology of the Bible, Volume 1: Persian Chronology and the Length of the Babylonian Exile of the Jews. Lester L. Grabbe, professor of Hebrew Bible and Early Judaism at the University of Hull, said of Furuli's study: "Once again we have an amateur who wants to rewrite scholarship.... F. shows little evidence of having put his theories to the test with specialists in Mesopotamian astronomy and Persian history." (In 2020, Furuli left the denomination but maintained that its chronological interpretations are correct.)

The relative positions of the moon, stars and planets indicated in the Babylonian astronomical diary VAT 4956 are used by secular historians to establish 568 BC as the thirty-seventh year of Nebuchadnezzar's reign. The Watch Tower Society claims that unnamed researchers have confirmed that the positions of the moon and stars on the tablet are instead consistent with astronomical calculations for 588 BC; the Society claims that the planets mentioned in the tablet cannot be clearly identified. The Watch Tower Society's article cites David Brown as stating, "some of the signs for the names of the planets and their positions are unclear". However, Brown indicates that the Babylonians also had unique names for the known planets, and Jonsson confirms that the unique names are those used in VAT 4956.

=== Evolution ===
The Watch Tower Society teaches a combination of gap creationism and day-age creationism, with an extended period between the initial creation of the universe and the subsequent 'creative days' in relation to the earth, which are said to have taken "thousands of years". It dismisses Young Earth creationism as "unscriptural and unbelievable", and states that Jehovah's Witnesses "are not creationists" on the basis that they do not believe the earth was created in six literal days.

Watch Tower Society publications attempt to refute the theory of evolution, in favor of divine creation. The Watch Tower Society's views of evolution have met with criticism typical of objections to evolution. Gary Botting described his own difficulty as a Jehovah's Witness to reconcile creation with simple observations of species diversification, especially after discussions with J.B.S. Haldane in India.

The Society's 1985 publication, Life—How Did it Get Here? By Evolution or by Creation? is criticized for its dependency on the book The Neck of the Giraffe authored by Francis Hitching, which is quoted five times. The book presents Hitching—a TV writer and paranormalist with no scientific credentials—as an evolutionist and scientist. Richard Dawkins also criticizes the book for implying that "chance" is the only alternative to deliberate design, stating, "[T]he candidate solutions to the riddle of improbability are not, as falsely implied, design and chance. They are design and natural selection."

== New World Translation criticisms ==
The Watch Tower Society has been criticized for its refusal to reveal the names and academic credentials of the translators of its New World Translation of the Holy Scriptures (NWT). The Society has claimed members of the NWT's translation committee wished to remain anonymous in order to exalt only the name of God, The Watchtower stating that the educational qualifications of the translators were unimportant and that "the translation itself testifies to their qualifications". Raymond Franz, a former member of the Governing Body, has claimed that of the four men he says constituted the committee, only one—its principal translator, his uncle Frederick Franz—had sufficient knowledge of biblical languages to have attempted the project. Frederick Franz had studied Greek for two years and was self-taught in Hebrew.

Much criticism of the NWT involves the rendering of certain texts considered to be biased towards specific Witness practices and doctrines. These include the use of "torture stake" instead of "cross" throughout the New Testament; the rendering of John 1:1, with the insertion of the indefinite article ("a") in its rendering to give "the Word was a god"; Romans 10:10, which uses the term "public declaration", which may reinforce the imperative to engage in public preaching; John 17:3, which used the term "taking in knowledge" rather than "know" to suggest that salvation is dependent on ongoing study, and the placement of the comma in Luke 23:43, which affects the timing of the fulfillment of Jesus' promise to the thief at Calvary.

Also criticized is the NWT's insertion of the name Jehovah 237 times in the New Testament without extant New Testament Greek manuscript evidence that the name existed there. Watch Tower publications have claimed that the name was "restored" on a sound basis, stating that when New Testament writers quote earlier Old Testament scriptures containing the Tetragrammaton (יהוה), "the translator has the right to render Kyrios ("LORD") as Jehovah." The NWT mentions twenty-seven other translations that have similarly rendered Kyrios as a form of the name Jehovah, stating that there is only one verse where the NWT does so without agreement from other translations.

The Society has claimed its translation "courageously restores God's name, Jehovah, to its proper place in the Biblical text, is free from the bias of religious traditionalism, and ... gives the literal meaning of God's Word as accurately as possible." Jason BeDuhn, associate professor of religious studies at Northern Arizona University, in Flagstaff, Arizona, compared nine major translations for accuracy. He stated that whilst there are "a handful of examples of bias in the [New World Translation (NW)]", that "most of the differences are due to the greater accuracy of the NW as a literal, conservative translation of the original expressions of the New Testament writers." He also wrote that the NWT's introduction of the name "Jehovah" into the New Testament 237 times was "not accurate translation by the most basic principle of accuracy". He concluded that "the NW and [another translation] are not bias free, and they are not perfect translations. But they are remarkably good translations ... often better than [the other six translations analyzed]." In his rebuttal, Thomas Howe strongly criticizes BeDuhn's positive review of the New World Translation, stating that the main goal of BeDuhn's book is to deny the deity of Christ.

== See also ==
- Beth Sarim
- Christian countercult movement
- Heresy in Christianity
- Heterodoxy
- Organizational structure of Jehovah's Witnesses
- History of Jehovah's Witnesses
- Watch Tower Society presidency dispute (1917)

== Sources ==
- Beckford, James A. (1975). The Trumpet of Prophecy: A Sociological Study of Jehovah's Witnesses. Oxford: Basil Blackwell. ISBN 0-631-16310-7.
- Holden, Andrew (2002). Jehovah's Witnesses: Portrait of a Contemporary Religious Movement. Routledge. ISBN 0-415-26609-2.
