= Crisis of Conscience =

1983 biographical book by Raymond Franz

- Author: Raymond Franz
- Language: English
- Subject: Religion
- Publisher: Commentary Press
- Publication date: 1983
- Publication place: United States
- Media type: Print
- Pages: 440
- ISBN: 0-914675-23-0
- Followed by: In Search of Christian Freedom

Crisis of Conscience is a biographical book by Raymond Franz, a former member of the Governing Body of Jehovah's Witnesses, written in 1983, three years after his expulsion from the Jehovah's Witnesses denomination. The book is a major study and exposé of the internal workings of the Watch Tower Bible and Tract Society during the 1960s and 1970s. The book was updated and revised four times, with the final revisions made in 2004. It was translated into Croatian, Czech, Danish, Dutch, French, German, Greek, Italian, Japanese, Korean, Polish, Portuguese, Romanian, Russian, Spanish and Swedish.

Franz spent 43 years as a Jehovah's Witness, serving as a full-time preacher in the United States and a missionary in Puerto Rico and the Dominican Republic. In 1965 he became a member of the religion's headquarters staff in Brooklyn, New York, where he was assigned to help research and write the Bible encyclopedia Aid to Bible Understanding and in 1971, appointed as a member of the religion's Governing Body. He left the Governing Body in 1980 after a high-level inquiry was launched into allegations that several headquarters staff including Franz were spreading "wrong teachings". He moved to Alabama where he worked as a farm laborer and was expelled from the religion in November 1981 for breaching an edict that Witnesses shun individuals who have formally resigned from the religion.

His expulsion was reported by Time magazine in February 1982. Franz claimed he declined repeated requests over the next two years for further media interviews about the workings of the Watch Tower Society, but in 1983 decided to end his silence after a number of Watchtower articles criticized the motives, character and conduct of former Witnesses who conscientiously disagreed with the organization. One article described dissidents as being "like ... Satan", "independent, faultfinding", "stubborn", "reviling", "haughty", "apostate" and "lawless".

Franz claimed that many Jehovah's Witnesses who choose to leave because they cannot "honestly agree with all the organization's teachings or policies" are subsequently disfellowshipped, or formally expelled, and shunned as "apostates". He wrote that he hoped his book might prompt Witnesses to consider the conscientious stand of defectors with a more open mind. He hoped that a discussion of deliberations and decisions of the Governing Body during his term would illustrate fundamental problems and serious issues within the organization: "They demonstrate the extremes to which 'loyalty to an organization' can lead, how it is that basically kind, well-intentioned persons can be led to make decisions and take actions that are both unkind and unjust, even cruel."

The book provides an abject view of Watch Tower Society leadership and its requirements of members, gives Franz's perspective on failed expectations among the Witness community that Armageddon would take place in 1975 and his views on fundamental Witness teachings on the significance of 1914 and continued expectations of Armageddon. It also gives his account of the events surrounding his expulsion from the religion. Former Witness James Penton, who included the book in the bibliography of his 1985 history of the Witness movement, described the book as "remarkably informative" and "thoroughly documented" and noted it was "written more in a tone of sadness than of anger". English sociologist Andrew Holden described the book as one of the most compelling biographical works on defection from Jehovah's Witnesses.
