= Jehovah's Witnesses beliefs =

Doctrines of Jehovah's Witnesses

The beliefs of Jehovah's Witnesses are based on the Bible teachings of Charles Taze Russell—founder of the Bible Student movement—and successive presidents of the Watch Tower Society, Joseph Franklin Rutherford, and Nathan Homer Knorr. Since 1976, all doctrinal decisions have been made by the Governing Body of Jehovah's Witnesses, a group of elders at the denomination's headquarters. These teachings are disseminated through The Watchtower magazine and other publications of Jehovah's Witnesses, and at conventions and congregation meetings.

Jehovah's Witnesses teach that the present world order, which they believe to be under the control of Satan, will be ended by a direct intervention of Jehovah (God), who will use Jesus to fully establish his heavenly government over earth, destroying existing human governments and non-Witnesses, and creating a cleansed society of true worshippers who will live forever. They see their mission as primarily evangelical, disseminating the good news, to warn as many people as possible in the remaining time before Armageddon. All members of the denomination are expected to take an active part in preaching. Witnesses refer to all their beliefs collectively as "the Truth".

== Doctrine sources ==
Doctrines of Jehovah's Witnesses are established by their Governing Body, which Witnesses are taught Jesus uses as a channel for God's progressive revelations and to direct Christians on biblical matters. Until late 2012, the Governing Body described itself as the representative and "spokesman" for God's "faithful and discreet slave class", a limited number of "anointed" Jehovah's Witnesses. The Governing Body seeks neither advice nor approval from any "anointed" Witnesses, other than high-ranking members. At the 2012 Annual Meeting of the Watch Tower Society, the "faithful and discreet slave" was defined as referring to the Governing Body only.

Jehovah's Witnesses are directed to welcome doctrinal changes, regarding such "adjustments" as "new light" or "new understanding" from God. The view is based on their interpretation of Proverbs 4:18, which they believe refers to a continuous progressive advancement in doctrinal knowledge and scriptural understanding for "righteous ones", with the holy spirit helping "responsible representatives of 'the faithful and discreet slave' at world headquarters to discern deep truths that were not previously understood".

Watch Tower literature has suggested such enlightenment results from the application of reason and study, the guidance of holy spirit, and direction from Jesus and angels. The Governing Body disclaims infallibility and divine inspiration. Robert Crompton, author of a book on Watch Tower eschatology, has noted that it is difficult to trace the development of doctrines, because explicit changes are often not identified in Jehovah's Witness literature, leaving readers to assume which details have been superseded.

The leadership makes no provision for members to criticize or contribute to official teachings. All Witnesses are expected to abide by the doctrines and organizational requirements as determined by the Governing Body. Watch Tower Society publications strongly discourage Witnesses from formulating doctrines and "private ideas" reached through independent Bible research. Members who promote privately developed teachings contrary to those of the Governing Body may be expelled and shunned.

== Organization ==
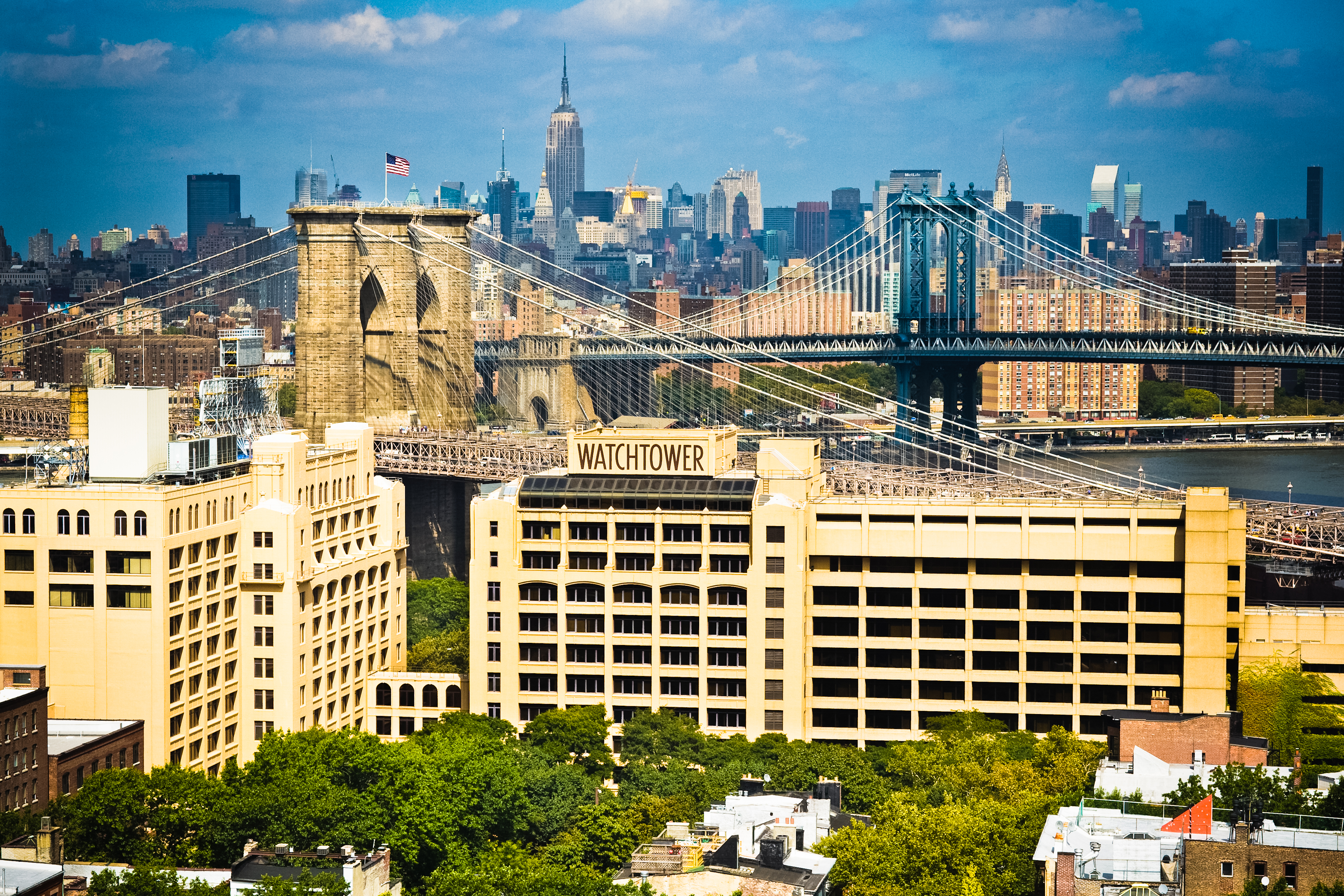
The former organization headquarters in Brooklyn, New York

Jehovah's Witnesses believe that God uses an organization both in heaven and on earth, and that Jehovah's Witnesses, under the direction of their Governing Body, are the only visible channel by which God communicates with humanity. The organization is said to be theocratic. Witnesses teach that people must choose between God's organization and Satan's. Watch Tower publications teach that the Bible is an "organizational book" that does not belong to individuals and that the Bible cannot be properly understood without guidance by "Jehovah's visible organization".

Witnesses undergoing baptism are required to publicly confirm that they are associating themselves "with God's spirit-directed organization", thereby submitting themselves to its direction and judicial system. Watch Tower Society publications urge Witnesses to demonstrate loyalty to the organization without dissent, even at the cost of family ties. Loyalty to the organization is said to require full involvement in public preaching and regular meeting attendance.

Disagreement with the Watch Tower Society's concept of God's organization, figured prominently in events that led to a 1980 purge of high-level members at the group's Brooklyn headquarters. A summary by a Governing Body committee of "wrong teachings" being promoted as "new understandings" included the suggestion that God did not have an organization on earth. Former Governing Body member Raymond Franz, who was expelled as part of the purge, subsequently criticized the Watch Tower concept of organization, claiming the concept—which posits that God does not deal with individuals apart from an organization—has no scriptural support and serves only to reinforce the group's authority structure, with its strong emphasis on human authority.

He also claimed that The Watchtower has repeatedly blurred discussions of both Jesus' loyalty to God and the apostles' loyalty to Christ to promote the view that Witnesses should be loyal to the Watch Tower Society. Sociologist Andrew Holden has observed that Witnesses see no distinction between loyalty to Jehovah and to the movement itself, and other researchers have claimed that challenging the views of those higher up the hierarchical ladder is regarded as tantamount to challenging God himself.

== Restorationism ==
Witnesses believe that after the death of the apostles, the Church embarked on a "Great Apostasy", diverging from the original teachings of Jesus on several major points. Influenced by Restorationism in the 19th century, Charles Taze Russell and his associates formed a Bible study group in the 1870s in Allegheny, Pennsylvania, developing teachings that they considered to be a revival of "the great truths taught by Jesus and the Apostles". Watch Tower publications claim both the Great Apostasy and Russell's subsequent "restoration" of original Christianity were a fulfilment of Jesus' parable of the wheat and the weeds at Matthew 13:24-30,36-43.

Although many of their eschatological teachings have changed over the years, Jehovah's Witnesses have consistently claimed to be the only true religion. Based on their interpretation of Revelation 18:2-24, Jehovah's Witnesses believe all other religions are part of "Babylon the Great", a "world empire of false religion" under the control of Satan. Consequently, they refuse all ecumenical relations with other religious denominations.

== Bible ==
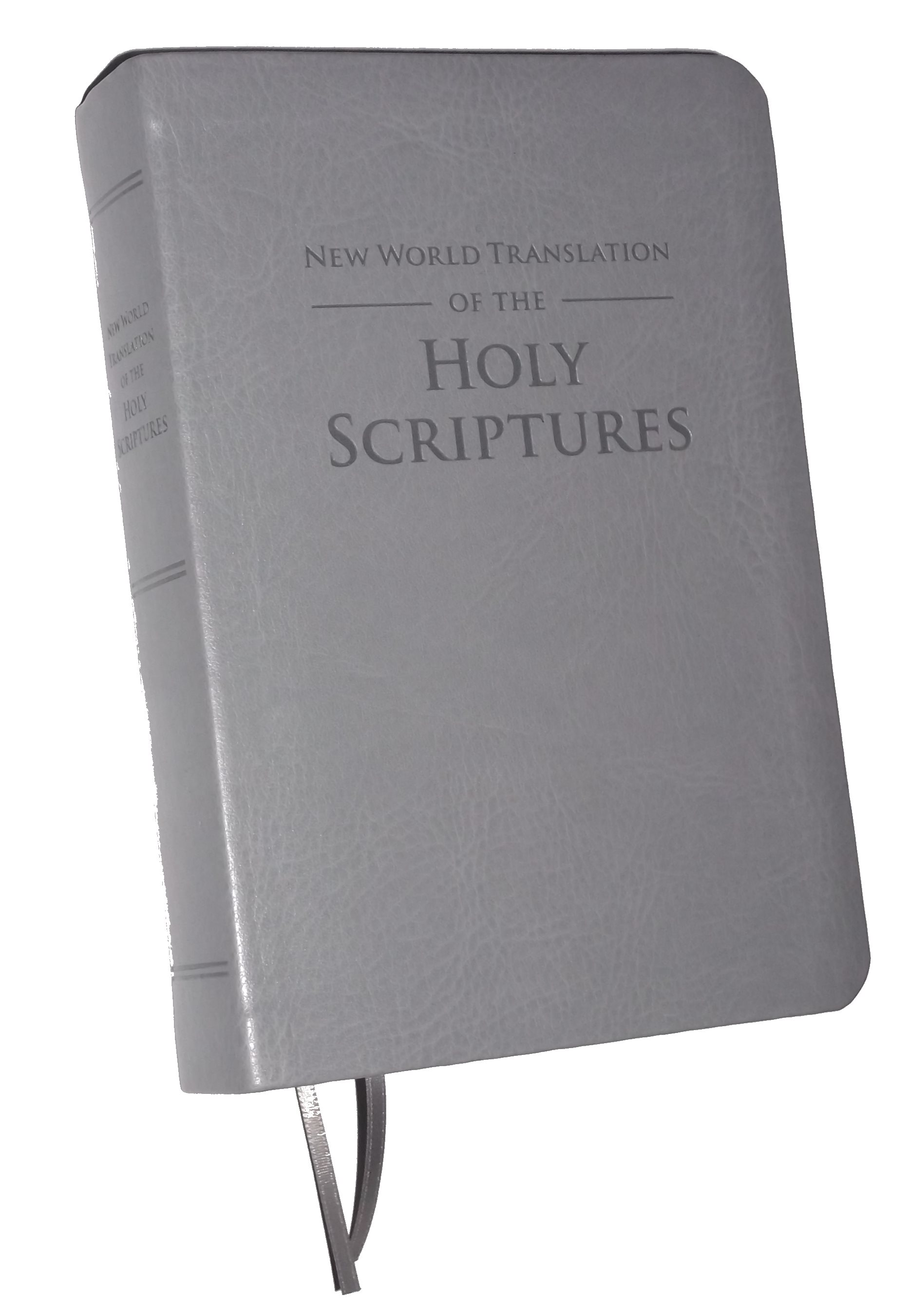
Jehovah's Witnesses prefer to use the New World Translation of the Bible.

The entire Protestant canon of scripture is seen as the inspired, inerrant word of God. Jehovah's Witnesses consider the Bible to be scientifically and historically accurate and reliable and interpret much of it literally, while also accepting it contains much symbolism. Jehovah's Witnesses base all of their beliefs on the Bible, as interpreted by the Governing Body.

However, Jehovah's Witnesses use the terms "Hebrew-Aramaic scriptures" and "Greek-Christian scriptures" as substitutes for "Old Testament" and "New Testament" respectively. This is because they believe that the Greek word popularly translated as "testament" is better rendered as "covenant". Moreover, they believe that there are four—not two—covenantal periods. In the Jehovah's Witnesses' telling, the Hebrew-Aramaic Scriptures contain prophecy that was fulfilled in Jesus, whereas the books of the Christian-Greek Scriptures (New Testament) are primarily directed to the 144,000 chosen by God for life in heaven. The Watch Tower Society's New World Translation of the Holy Scriptures—the main translation used by Jehovah's Witnesses—renders the name of God as Jehovah, rather than God or LORD as found in English translations such as the King James Version.

== God ==
Jehovah's Witnesses believe God is the creator and supreme being. Witnesses reject the Trinity doctrine, which they consider unscriptural. They view God as the Father, an invisible spirit person separate from the Son, Jesus Christ. The Holy Spirit is described as God's "active force", rather than the third part of the Trinity. They believe God is "infinite, but approachable"; he is not omnipresent, but has a location in heaven; it is possible to have a personal relationship with him as a friend; he is kind and merciful, and would not eternally torture wicked people. Being respectful of the principle of free will, he does not force his sovereignty on people, choosing to save only those who want to serve him, even though the course of mankind in general may lead them to harm.

Witnesses teach that God must be distinguished by his personal name—Jehovah. The name is a common modern Latinized form of the Hebrew Tetragrammaton, or four-letter name, transliterated as YHWH. The use of his personal name is regarded as vital for true worship, and Witnesses usually preface the term God with the name Jehovah. The title, LORD (Greek: Kyrios), is rarely used by Witnesses when speaking about God. Because other denominations do not use the name Jehovah as frequently, they believe that only Jehovah's Witnesses are making God's name known.

== Jesus ==
Jehovah's Witnesses believe that Jesus is God's "only-begotten Son", and that his life began in heaven. He is described as God's first creation and the "exact representation of God", but is believed to be a separate entity and not part of a Trinity. Jesus is said to have been used by God in the creation of all other things. Jehovah's Witnesses believe that the Archangel Michael, "the Word" of John 1:1, and wisdom personified in Proverbs 8 refer to Jesus in his pre-human existence and that he resumed these identities after his ascension to heaven following his death and resurrection. They also identify him with the "rider of the white horse" at Revelation 6 and 19. His birth on earth was accomplished when he willingly allowed himself to be transferred, by God, from heaven to the womb of the virgin, Mary. While on earth, Jesus was executed as a sacrifice to atone for mankind's sins, becoming the "eternal father" to the human family.

They believe that after his death, Jesus appeared to his disciples, convinced them of his resurrection, and then ascended into heaven to sit at Jehovah's right hand until he would become the promised king of God's heavenly kingdom. Jesus acts as the mediator of a "New Covenant" referred to in Jeremiah 31:31, Luke 22:20, and Hebrews 9:15; 12:24, mediating between the parties of that covenant (God and the "144,000"). Those with an earthly hope are said to be beneficiaries of that covenant. Even as king of God's kingdom, Jesus remains subordinate to God. Witnesses reject the doctrine of the perpetual virginity of Mary, who they believe bore more children after Jesus.

== Cross ==
The Watch Tower Bible and Tract Society used the Cross and Crown symbol on tombstones, and on its publications until 1931. Since 1936, Jehovah's Witnesses have rejected the idea that Jesus died on a cross, and instead teach that he died on a single wooden stake (crux simplex), asserting that the Koine Greek word "σταυρός" (stauros) refers to a single upright post. They consider the cross to be of pagan origins, and veneration of the cross or other representations of Jesus' execution is considered idolatry. According to the Watch Tower society, some Jehovah's Witnesses have been persecuted or killed for not venerating a cross.

== Satan ==
Jehovah's Witnesses believe that Satan was originally a perfect angel who developed feelings of self-importance and craved worship that belonged to God. Satan persuaded Adam and Eve to obey him rather than God, raising the issue—often referred to as a "controversy"—of whether people, having been granted free will, would obey God under both temptation and persecution. The issue is said to be whether God can rightfully claim to be sovereign of the universe. Instead of destroying Satan, God decided to test the loyalty of the rest of humankind and to prove to the rest of creation that Satan was a liar. Jehovah's Witnesses believe that Satan is God's chief adversary and the invisible ruler of the world. They believe that demons were originally angels who rebelled against God and took Satan's side in the controversy.

Jehovah's Witnesses do not believe that Satan lives in Hell or that he has been given responsibility to punish the wicked. Satan and his demons are said to have been cast down from heaven to the earth in 1914, marking the beginning of the "last days". Witnesses believe that Satan and his demons influence individuals, organizations and nations, and that they are the cause of human suffering. At Armageddon, Satan is to be bound for 1,000 years, and then given a brief opportunity to mislead perfect humanity before being destroyed.

Writers including James Beckford and former members James Penton and Barbara Grizzuti Harrison have stated that Jehovah's Witnesses' have a fear of demons, which Penton says is "sometimes so extreme that it becomes quite superstitious". Penton also notes that avoidance of "demonistic practices" has released many people in Africa and Latin America from fear of spirits. Watch Tower Society publications state that Witnesses need not harbor dread or superstitious fear of demons, because their power over humans is limited.

== Creation ==
The Watch Tower Society teaches a form of special creation comprising a combination of gap creationism and day-age creationism, with an extended period between the initial creation of the universe and the subsequent 'creative days' in relation to the earth, which are said to have taken "thousands of years". It dismisses Young Earth creationism as "unscriptural and unbelievable", and states that Jehovah's Witnesses "are not creationists" on the basis that they do not believe the earth was created in six literal days. Watch Tower Society publications attempt to refute the theory of evolution, in favor of divine intelligent design. The Society teaches that the first human, Adam, was created in 4026 BCE.

== God's Messianic Kingdom ==
Publications of Jehovah's Witnesses teach that God's kingdom is a literal government in heaven, established in 1914, ruled by Jesus and 144,000 humans raised to heaven. The kingdom is viewed as the means by which God will accomplish his original purpose for the earth, bringing about a world free of crime, sickness, death and poverty, and ultimately transforming the earth into a paradise. The kingdom is said to have been the focus of Jesus' ministry.

== Death ==
Witnesses regard the soul as mortal, based on their exegesis of Bible passages such as Ezekiel 18:4, which says that "the soul that sins, it shall die" (MKJV). They believe the soul does not continue to live after one dies. Death is considered a state of non-existence, based on their understanding of Bible texts such as Ecclesiastes 9:5: "For the living are conscious that they will die; but as for the dead, they are conscious of nothing at all." Witnesses believe that the only hope for life after death is in the resurrection, which they say involves re-creation by God of the same individual with a new body. They believe that 144,000 people will be resurrected to life as spirit creatures in heaven to be priestly rulers under Christ, but the vast majority, to physical life on earth.

Watch Tower publications teach that hell (hades or sheol) is not a place of fiery torment, but rather the "common grave of mankind", a place of unconscious non-existence. Gehenna, the Bible word commonly translated as "hellfire", is said to describe a judgment of complete destruction, from which resurrection is not possible. They reason that complete destruction does not allow for literal "torture" of the wicked, as the deceased person is not conscious. Based on this, they believe that parables such as that of "the rich man and Lazarus" should not be interpreted literally, and that such references are speaking of symbolic death, not the physical death of actual individuals.

Witnesses teach that wicked angels (demons) sometimes pretend to be spirits of the dead, and that their deception is the basis for many beliefs about ghosts.

== Salvation ==
Jehovah's Witnesses' believe that faith in Jesus' ransom sacrifice is essential for salvation. They reject the concept of universal salvation and the concept of predestination. They believe that all intelligent creatures are endowed with free will, and that salvation is dependent on God's "undeserved kindness", but also requires faith in God and in the "ransom sacrifice" of Jesus, demonstrated by "zealous" preaching activity. According to Watch Tower Society theology, salvation requires Christ's mediation as part of God's purpose to grant humans everlasting life, either in heaven (for 144,000 "anointed" Christians, or the "little flock") or on earth (for the "other sheep", the remainder of faithful humanity).

For anointed Witnesses, salvation is said to be achieved through their death and subsequent resurrection to heavenly life to share with Christ as a co-ruler of God's kingdom; for others, it is gained by preservation through the Great Tribulation and the battle of Armageddon. Watch Tower Society publications state that salvation at Armageddon is also contingent on baptism, accurate knowledge of Bible truth, adherence to God's standards of conduct and morality, use of the divine name "Jehovah" in worship, membership of God's "organization", and active support of anointed Christians.

=== 144,000 anointed ===
Based on a literal interpretation of scriptures such as Revelation 14:1–4, Jehovah's Witnesses believe that exactly 144,000 faithful Christians go to heaven as spirit creatures to rule with Christ in the kingdom of God. They believe that most of those are already in heaven, and that the "remnant" at Revelation 12:17 (KJV) refers to those remaining alive on earth who will be immediately resurrected to heaven when they die or during the Great Tribulation. The Witnesses understand Jesus' words at John 3:3—"except a man be born again, he cannot see the kingdom of God"—to apply to the 144,000 who are "born again" as "anointed" sons of God in heaven. They associate the terms "Israel of God" (Galatians 6:16), "little flock" (Luke 12:32), and "the bride, the Lamb's wife" (Revelation 21:9) in the New Testament with the "anointed".

Members who claim to be anointed are not given special treatment by other congregation members. Jehovah's Witnesses believe that being anointed involves a personal revelation by God's spirit which "gives positive assurance of adoption" to the individual alone. Only those claiming to be anointed partake of the unleavened bread and wine at the yearly commemoration of Christ's death, or Memorial. According to The Watchtower, "the Governing Body does not keep a list of all partakers, for it does not maintain a global network of anointed ones."

=== Other sheep ===
Watch Tower Society literature states that Jesus' use of the term "other sheep" at John 10:16 indicates a separate class with an earthly hope. Those who die faithful to God will receive the "resurrection of the righteous" ("just" KJV) mentioned at Acts 24:15. Those who die without faithfully serving God will receive the "resurrection of the ... unrighteous" ("unjust" KJV). They will be given the opportunity to join Jesus' "other sheep" and live forever on a paradise earth. Those destroyed at Armageddon and other specific judgments by God are not resurrected. Those who survive Armageddon without needing a resurrection are referred to as the "great crowd".

== Eschatology ==
Watch Tower Society publications teach that Jesus began to rule in heaven invisibly as king in October 1914. They assert that the Greek word parousia (translated in most English Bible translations as coming when referring to Christ) is more accurately rendered presence, perceived only by a composite "sign". As such, the Second Coming is considered an invisible presence, lasting for an extended period of time, and ending with Jesus' "coming" to separate the Sheep and the Goats. They believe that when Jesus became king, Satan was ousted from heaven to the earth, bringing a period of "woe" to mankind.

Witnesses base their beliefs about the significance of 1914 on the Watch Tower Society's interpretation of biblical chronology, based on their belief that the destruction of Jerusalem and the beginning of the Babylonian captivity both occurred in 607 BCE. (The secularly accepted date for the fall of Jerusalem is within a year of 587 BCE; exiles were taken in various years, with most Jews exiled to Babylon following the siege of Jerusalem of 597 BCE.) They believe that Daniel chapter 4 prophesied a period of 2,520 years starting with 607 BCE and ending at 1914 CE.

They equate this period with the "Gentile Times" or "the appointed times of the nations", a phrase taken from Luke 21:24. They believe that when the Babylonians conquered Jerusalem, the line of kings descended from David was interrupted, and that God's throne was "trampled on" from then until Jesus began ruling in October 1914. Witnesses believe their doctrine is confirmed by world events since 1914, including wars, famine, earthquakes and increasing lawlessness, which they see as fulfillment of the "sign" of Christ's presence. They believe that their preaching is also part of that sign, citing Matthew 24:14. Witnesses teach that in 1918, Jesus resurrected those of the 144,000 (the "anointed") who had already died to heavenly life; since 1918, any "anointed" are individually resurrected to heavenly life at the time of their death to serve as kings alongside Christ in his heavenly government.

The current world era, or "system of things", is considered to be in its "last days", facing imminent destruction through intervention by God and Christ, leading to deliverance for those who worship God acceptably. This judgment will begin with the destruction by the United Nations of false religion, which they identify as "Babylon the Great", or the "harlot", of Revelation 17. This will mark the beginning of the great tribulation. Satan will subsequently attack Jehovah's Witnesses, an action that will prompt God to begin the war of Armageddon, during which all forms of government and all people not counted as Christ's "sheep", or true followers, will be destroyed. The Society's publications make no explicit claim about whether small children or the mentally ill will survive, but say God's judgment will be righteous and merciful. After Armageddon, Satan will be cast into an abyss and unable to influence humanity, then God will extend his heavenly kingdom to include earth, which will be transformed into a paradise similar to the Garden of Eden.

Most of those who had died prior to God's intervention will gradually be resurrected to a "day of judgment" lasting for the thousand years referred to in Revelation 20. This judgment will be based on their actions after resurrection rather than past deeds. At the end of the thousand years, Christ will hand all authority back to God. Then Satan is released for a final opportunity to mislead perfect mankind; Satan, his demons, and any who fail the test will be destroyed, leaving a fully tested, perfect human race who will live forever.

== Defection ==
Watch Tower Society publications assert that members of the group are not compelled to remain part of the congregation. They believe coerced worship is unacceptable to God. Its doctrine provides no method for members to terminate membership and remain in good standing. Individuals who choose to depart and announce their decision to terminate their membership are regarded as abandoning God's organization and protection. Watch Tower publications define three types of defection. One as becoming inactive, one as becoming disassociated, and one as being removed. Individuals who are inactive discontinue their preaching work and distance themselves from the congregation.

Inactive members may be visited by church elders and other congregation members. Individuals who choose to publicly repudiate their association to the organization and renounce their place in the congregation are considered disassociated. Individuals who are considered to have unrepentantly committed serious sins or resign from the denomination are shunned. The Watch Tower Society instructs members to have minimal contact with shunned individuals, including close relatives. As of March 2024, members are permitted to invite shunned individuals to congregation meetings or offer brief greetings at meetings, unless the individual is deemed to be an apostate.

Jehovah's Witnesses claim that shunning wrongdoers safeguards the congregation's moral and spiritual cleanliness and protects its name. They believe the congregation must "maintain God's favor in order to be used by him and to represent him" or else the whole congregation would lose God's approval. Sociologist Andrew Holden claims his research indicated many Witnesses who would otherwise defect because of disillusionment with the organization and its teachings remain affiliated out of fear of being shunned and losing contact with friends and family members.

== Apostasy ==
Jehovah's Witnesses place strong emphasis on organizational unity and adherence to the direction of the Watch Tower Society, teaching that unity of belief and conduct is essential for true worship. Witnesses are told to have a "waiting attitude" regarding doctrinal doubts or disagreement with the leadership rather than openly voicing their concerns. The Watch Tower Society states that causing divisions or dissension within the congregation is immoral, and that "those who practice such things will not inherit God’s Kingdom", citing Galatians 5.

Watch Tower Society publications define apostasy as the abandonment of the worship and service of God by members of the Christian congregation, and equate it with rebellion against God. Apostate behavior is said to include the rejection of biblical teachings or requirements, the rejection of Jehovah's organization, association with or support for another religious group and celebration of holidays. It is grounds for expulsion from the group and subsequent shunning. Promotion of personal doctrinal views that deviate from official teachings is also regarded as apostasy. The "identifying marks" of apostates are said to include attempts to gain followers, disregard for the Witnesses' preaching activity, rejection of God's visible organization, public criticism of other Witnesses and attempts to hinder their work. Other identifying behavior is said to include deviation from the truth, twisted, empty speech, hypocrisy and involvement in deeper forms of ungodliness. Watch Tower Society literature says apostates are motivated by vitriolic bitterness and that their writings are poisonous, distorted and false, display the characteristics of "cunning, contrived error, prideful intelligence, lack of love and dishonesty" and are designed to undermine the faith of Jehovah's Witnesses. Apostates are described as proud, independent, ungrateful and presumptuous, mentally diseased, displaying jealousy, fits of anger and other unchristian conduct and are said to often fall victim to drunken bouts, loose conduct and fornication.

Apostates are said to have become part of the antichrist and are regarded as more reprehensible than non-Witnesses. They are described as "anti-God" and doomed to destruction. Witnesses are told they must loathe and hate in the "biblical sense of the word" those who are defined as apostates and show no curiosity about their ideas, and that apostates' "whole purpose is to tear down God's people and to distort the truth." Apostates must be shunned and Witnesses are warned that those who greet one become "a sharer in his wicked works".

== Education ==
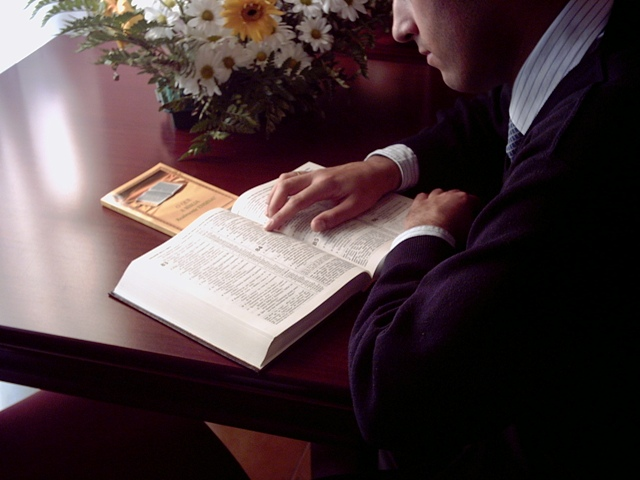
Jehovah's Witnesses are directed to study the Bible using Watch Tower Society publications.

Jehovah's Witnesses promote moral and spiritual education over secular education. Higher education was discouraged, based on their belief that it is futile to plan for secular advancement in a world that faces imminent destruction, as well as fears about succumbing to greed, corruption, and materialism. There are concerns that those who seek high education will become distracted from their preaching work by material advancement and success. Because evangelistic activities take priority over educational success, young Witnesses rarely progress to college or university, which Holden describes as a source of regret in subsequent years among those who are raised in the organization and later choose to leave. Watch Tower Society publications advise parents to recommend alternatives to university education for their children, suggesting associate degrees from community or technical colleges or short courses in subjects. They urge young Witnesses to pursue higher education only to gain skills to obtain a reasonable living while maintaining flexibility to pursue their "true" vocation, serving God. Author James Penton's major study of the Witnesses, Apocalypse Delayed, noted that of those Witnesses who do progress to university level, few are likely to take studies in such areas as the humanities and the social sciences, "disciplines that are most threatening to the Witness world-view". According to Carrie S. Ingersoll-Wood, "By eliminating access to external knowledge, the congregation as a whole surrenders autonomy and willingly subjects themselves and their children to the external regulation of the religion." In 2025, the view of higher education was adjusted, with a statement that, "While there are dangers involved in pursuing certain forms of education, basically, whether to obtain additional education or not is a matter for personal decision," and that, "no Christian—including the elders—should judge a fellow Christian's personal decision on this matter."

Jehovah's Witnesses provide religious training programs for their members, focusing on improving skills for their ministry. These include literacy classes, Pioneer Service School, School for Kingdom Evangelizers and Gilead School. Some of these programs are by invitation only.

== See also ==
- Jehovah's Witnesses and blood transfusions

== Bibliography ==
- Botting, Gary and Heather (1984). The Orwellian World of Jehovah's Witnesses. University of Toronto Press.
- Botting, Gary (1993). Fundamental Freedoms and Jehovah's Witnesses. University of Calgary Press.
- Chryssides, George D. (2016). "Jehovah's Witnesses: Anticipating Armageddon". In Hunt, Stephen J. (ed.). Handbook of Global Contemporary Christianity: Movements, Institutions, and Allegiance. Brill. pp. 422–440. ISBN 978-90-04-31078-0.
- Crompton, Robert (1996), Counting the Days to Armageddon, Cambridge: James Clarke & Co, ISBN 0-227-67939-3
- Franz, Raymond (2002). Crisis of Conscience. Commentary Press. ISBN 0-914675-23-0.
- Franz, Raymond (2007). In Search of Christian Freedom. Commentary Press. ISBN 978-0-914675-16-7.
- Holden, Andrew (2002). Jehovah's Witnesses: Portrait of a Contemporary Religious Movement. Routledge. ISBN 0-415-26610-6.
- Penton, James M. (1997). Apocalypse Delayed: The Story of Jehovah's Witnesses (2nd ed.). University of Toronto Press. ISBN 0-8020-7973-3.
