= SOTL =

SOTL can refer to:

- The Silence of the Lambs
- Stars of the Lid
- Scholarship of Teaching and Learning
- Ship of the line
- Spec Ops: The Line
- School of the Legends
- Sister of the Leaf
