= Awake! =

Illustrated religious magazine

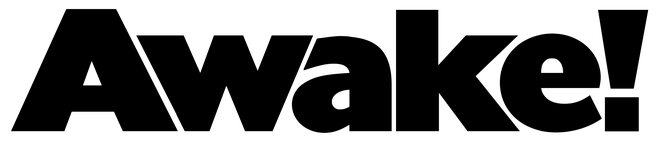

- Cover of Awake! (No. 5, 2017)
- Categories: Religious
- Frequency: Annual
- Circulation: more than 33,200,000
- Publisher: Watch Tower Bible and Tract Society of Pennsylvania
- First issue: October 1, 1919 (as The Golden Age)
- Company: Jehovah's Witnesses
- Country: United States
- Based in: Warwick, New York, U.S.
- Language: more than 269 languages
- Website: Awake!
- ISSN: 0005-237X

Awake! is an illustrated religious magazine published by the Watch Tower Bible and Tract Society of Pennsylvania. It is considered to be a companion magazine of The Watchtower, and is distributed by Jehovah's Witnesses. The Watch Tower Society reports printing in more than 269 languages & a worldwide circulation of more than 33.2 million copies per issue.

== History ==
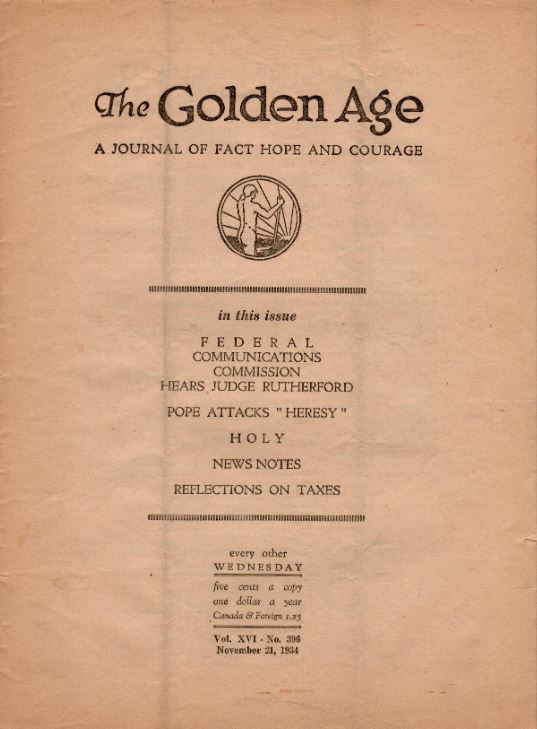
The November 21, 1934 edition of The Golden Age

The magazine was originally published bimonthly from October 1, 1919, under the title The Golden Age. It was founded for use in the Bible Students' new door-to-door ministry, though the founder of the movement, Charles Taze Russell, had indicated in his will that the Watch Tower Society would not publish any periodicals other than The Watch Tower. Clayton J. Woodworth was editor of the magazine, and later went on to serve on the boards of several corporations of Jehovah's Witnesses. On October 6, 1937, the magazine was renamed Consolation and continued to be published biweekly until July 31, 1946.

On August 22, 1946, the magazine was renamed Awake!, drawing its new title from Romans 13:11 (ASV): "... it is time for you to awake out of sleep: for now is salvation nearer to us than when we first believed". The magazine's editorship then became anonymous. (Autobiographical articles credited to individual members about their experiences and circumstances occasionally appear.)

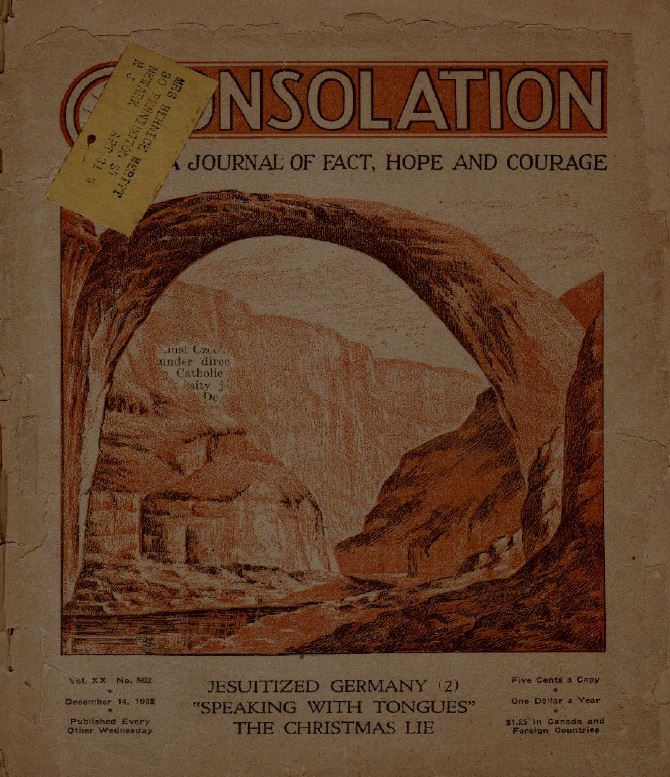
Consolation magazine, December 14, 1938

From 1982 to 1995, each issue of the magazine included a mission statement that stated: "this magazine builds confidence in the Creator's promise of a peaceful and secure new order before the generation that saw 1914 passes away". When Jehovah's Witnesses' belief regarding the "generation" of 1914 was changed to a less literal sense, the aim was restated as, "this magazine builds confidence in the Creator's promise of a peaceful and secure new world that is about to replace the present wicked, lawless system of things".

Until 2005, Awake! was published semimonthly in major languages (on the 8th and 22nd), monthly in many languages, and quarterly in a few languages. From January 2006, the magazine was published monthly. As of January 2016, it was published every two months and was further reduced to three issues per year as of January 2018. In 2022, publication was reduced to one new issue per year.

== Content ==
The Golden Age outlined its primary aim in its first issue, stating, "we will point the people to the clear and indisputable evidence in the light of present-day events, disclosing the divinely expressed remedy for the reconstruction of human affairs that will bring the desire of all nations, assuring to the people life, liberty, and happiness." The magazine also contained articles about "social, political, and economic issue and was not confined to purely religious matters". George D. Chryssides notes that some articles "were opposed to orthodox medicine", particularly against vaccinations, theories about germs and the use of aluminum cooking utensils, "and recommended alternative methods of health care and remedies".

Awake! contains articles on general interest topics such as nature, geography, health, family life, and also the Bible and biblical history, and is overseen by the Writing Committee of the Governing Body of Jehovah's Witnesses. Many issues claim that mankind is living in the end times.

== Distribution ==
The magazine is printed in nineteen countries. Awake! has a worldwide circulation of more than 32,200,000 copies of each issue and is available, in selected languages, online in various digital formats.

The magazine is distributed by Jehovah's Witnesses in the course of their public ministry including door-to-door canvassing, approaching people in public places, given informally to acquaintances and professionals, or left as reading material in waiting areas.

=== Cost ===
The Golden Age was initially available for $1.50 (equivalent to $28 in 2025) per year on a subscription basis. Until March 1990, Awake! was available for a small charge that varied over time and in different countries. For example, in the United States, the suggested donation per issue was $0.05 in 1950, gradually increasing to $0.25 in 1989. On January 17, 1990, the Supreme Court of the United States ruled against Jimmy Swaggart that sales of religious literature were subject to taxation, which introduced ambiguity into the formerly tax-free practice of suggesting a particular donation in exchange for the magazines. The Watch Tower Society supported Swaggart in the case, arguing that the perceived sale of religious literature should be exempt from taxation.

From March 1, 1990, the magazines were made available at no cost, on a freewill donation basis in the United States, with the stated purpose of simplifying their Bible educational work and distinguishing themselves from those who commercialize religion. An article in the May 1990 issue of Our Kingdom Ministry—a newsletter provided to members—stated that "there are growing pressures against all religious elements" and went on to say that their main concern was to move ahead in the worldwide preaching work, "without hindrance".

The sale of Jehovah's Witnesses' literature was gradually phased out in other countries, and Awake! has been distributed free of charge worldwide since early 2000, its printing being funded by voluntary donations from Jehovah's Witnesses and members of the public.

== See also ==
- Jehovah's Witnesses publications
- List of magazines by circulation

== Sources ==
- Chryssides, George D. (2008). Historical Dictionary of Jehovah's Witnesses. Historical Dictionaries of Religions, Philosophies, and Movements. Vol. 85. The Scarecrow Press, Inc. ISBN 978-0-8108-6074-2.
- Melton, J. Gordon (August 9, 2019). "Jehovah's Witnesses". Encyclopedia Britannica.
- Knox, Zoé (2018). Jehovah's Witnesses and the Secular World: From the 1870s to the Present. Histories of the Sacred and Secular, 1700-2000. Palgrave Macmillan Inc. doi:10.1057/978-1-137-39605-1. ISBN 978-1-137-39604-4. LCCN 2017955670.
