= Silentlambs =

Non-profit that assists victims of child abuse within the Jehovah's Witnesses

- Founded: 2000
- Founder: William Bowen
- Type: Non-profit (501 C3)
- Purpose: Child sexual abuse
- Location: Dayton, Tennessee, USA
- Method: Legal assistance and education
- Website: www.silentlambs.org

Silentlambs is a United States–based non-profit organization, founded by William Bowen, that assists victims of child sexual abuse experienced within the religious organization of Jehovah's Witnesses. Silentlambs' stated purpose is to help educate the public and Jehovah's Witnesses about child sexual abuse, and to assist abuse survivors who have been molested as children and silenced from speaking out or seeking proper assistance as directed by religious authority. The group states that it has received reports from more than 5000 Jehovah's Witnesses contending that the organization mishandled cases of child sexual abuse.

In 2012, an attorney for the Watch Tower Society claimed that the Silentlambs website airs the personal grievances of its owner towards his former religious associates and lacks scholarly research.

== Founder ==
Silentlambs was founded in 2001 by William H. Bowen, a second generation Jehovah's Witness. Bowen served as an elder for approximately 15 years, and worked in the printing factory at the headquarters of Jehovah's Witnesses from 1977 until 1979. According to Bowen, he was removed as an elder in July 1992 for refusing to back down on a matter involving the appointment of a child molester. He was reappointed as an elder in 1994, but resigned the position in December 2000 over concerns about new allegations of child abuse and continued disagreement with Jehovah's Witnesses' policies for reporting child sex abuse. According to Bowen, he was disfellowshipped in 2002 for actions considered to constitute "causing divisions" and tantamount to "apostasy". Bowen claims to be an expert in comparative religions including Jehovah's Witnesses, the Catholic Church and Mormonism regarding child sex abuse policies, and provides services as a consultant for attorneys who file civil cases against Jehovah's Witnesses. He has stated that he is not an expert regarding investigations of sex abuse allegations, nor an expert regarding the historical standards of care and detection of child abuse. Bowen has self-published two books, and states that he is an expert in child custody and taxation policies of Jehovah's Witnesses.

== Watch Tower Society database ==
Bowen claims that the Jehovah's Witnesses' headquarters, the Watch Tower Bible and Tract Society, maintains a database with the names of over twenty thousand abusers; he claims the list has not been released because it would hurt the public image of the church.

The Watch Tower Society states that the number of names in its records is "considerably lower", but does not specify an actual number. It stated that the purpose of the database is not to protect child molesters, but for legal reasons and to prevent molesters from being appointed in positions of authority. It also states that the number includes individuals who are not necessarily Jehovah's Witnesses, but who are "associated with" them. The Watch Tower Society has acknowledged that its handling of abuse cases has not been perfect, but claims its policies were exemplary and superior to those of other religions. According to some former members, Jehovah's Witnesses may discipline or excommunicate members who have molested children, without turning the offender over to police.

== Lawsuits ==
In September 2002, Bowen organized and participated in a demonstration in front of the headquarters of Jehovah's Witnesses in Brooklyn, New York. In the spring of the same year, Silentlambs assisted in bringing the first series of major civil lawsuits against the Watch Tower Society over the mishandling of child abuse. These and other subsequent cases were settled out of court with the details kept confidential.

In 2012, the Watch Tower Society's attorney stated in a court memorandum that no courts in the United States had previously found its conduct or policy regarding sex-abuse to be unlawful. The attorney also stated that the Silentlambs website is a vehicle for Bowen to "air his personal grievances against his former religious associates", and that Bowen's comments lack scholarly research and are consistently accusatory of the beliefs of Jehovah's Witnesses.

== See also ==
- Child sexual abuse
- Criticism of Jehovah's Witnesses
- Jehovah's Witnesses and child sex abuse
