= The Silence of the Lambs =

The Silence of the Lambs or Silence of the Lamb may refer to:

- The Silence of the Lambs (novel), a 1988 novel by Thomas Harris
  - The Silence of the Lambs (film), a 1991 film directed by Jonathan Demme based on the novel and starring Jodie Foster and Anthony Hopkins
  - The Silence of the Lambs (play), a 2026 stage play by Gina Gionfriddo based on the novel
- "Silence of the Lamb" (Veronica Mars), a 2005 television episode of Veronica Mars
- Waldsinfonie: The Silence of the Lamb, a 1993 Autopsia CD

== See also ==
- Silentlambs
