= Jehovah's Witnesses congregational discipline =

Congregation discipline as practiced by Jehovah's Witnesses

Jehovah's Witnesses employ various levels of congregational discipline as formal controls administered by congregation elders. Members who engage in conduct that is considered inappropriate may be counseled privately by elders, and congregational responsibilities may be withheld or restricted.

Private hearings involving "serious sin" are performed by formal elder committees, in which guilt and repentance are determined by a tribunal of elders. A variety of controls can be enforced, from reproof and restriction of congregational duties to excommunication, which includes shunning. Individuals who are removed may be later reinstated if they are deemed to demonstrate repentance. The practice of shunning, particularly that of family members, has been criticized by many non-members and ex-members.

== Counsel and guidance ==
=== Personal counsel ===
Congregation elders may offer counsel in privileged settings, with the opportunity for the member to confess wrongdoing. If counsel is not accepted, congregational responsibilities may be withheld or restricted.

Counsel may be given in situations involving actions that are considered inappropriate but are not considered to be of sufficient gravity to necessitate a committee. Counsel may be provided by a mature Witness in addition to self-discipline and family discipline. Elders may also give recommendations or warnings to members in non-judicial situations.

=== Shepherding calls ===
Personal "shepherding visits" are intended to encourage members of the congregation, though may also include counsel and correction, then or on a subsequent visit. Two elders (or one elder and a ministerial servant) may schedule and perform a shepherding visit on their own or at the direction of the body of elders.

=== Withheld "privileges" ===
An active Jehovah's Witness may lose "privileges in the congregation", even without having committed a serious sin, if their good intentions lead to adverse effects for "those following their example". While Witnesses sometimes refer to field ministry, after-meeting cleanup, and other responsibilities as "privileges", the term "privileges of service" often implies a specific range of assignments assisting elders and ministerial servants with meeting demonstrations and other responsibilities. Such limitations are usually temporary.

Elders, ministerial servants, pioneers, or other formally appointed Witnesses can lose their "special privileges of service". For example, an elder may be removed or choose to step aside voluntarily from his position if members of his household are not in "good standing". After resignation or removal from an appointed position, an announcement is made during the congregation's Service Meeting indicating that the person is "no longer serving [in that capacity]", without elaboration.

=== Withheld recommendations or assignments ===
The body of elders may withhold its recommendation for a member to serve in a new position of responsibility, though still permitting existing responsibilities.

=== Marking ===
Members who persist in a course considered scripturally wrong after repeated counsel by elders, but who are not considered guilty of something for which they could be formally shunned, can be "marked", based on Jehovah's Witnesses' interpretation of 2 Thessalonians 3:14–15 (NWT): "14 But if anyone is not obedient to our word through this letter, keep this one marked and stop associating with him, so that he may become ashamed. 15 And yet do not consider him an enemy, but continue admonishing him as a brother." Actions for which an individual may be "marked" include dating a non-member, dating when not "scripturally" or legally free to marry, being extremely lazy, critical, or dirty, meddling, scheming to take material advantage of others, or indulging in "clearly improper" entertainment. For many years, the practice of "marking" was indicated by means of a warning talk given to the congregation outlining the inappropriate behavior, without explicitly naming any particular individual. Those aware of the behavior of the individual could then consider the individual "marked". In 2024, changes were made to the marking process; elders no longer present a talk about the undesired behavior, and it is instead up to individual members who are aware of another member's errant behavior to "make a personal decision not to associate" with the person. Though not shunned, "marked" individuals are looked upon as "pursuing a disorderly course" and social interaction outside of formal worship settings is generally curtailed. This action is intended to "shame" the person into following a particular course of action.

=== Local needs ===
At conventions and assemblies, and about once each month at a local midweek meeting, a short talk regarding "local needs" is presented. An elder addresses matters that are relevant to the local congregation, with instructions outlining the course of action considered appropriate. No specific individuals are identified during the talk, but the talk may relate to a matter for which a member has recently been "reproved". At times, some temporary policy may be announced that might be seen as disciplinary; for example, it may be that an additional attendant is assigned outside a Kingdom Hall to discourage children from running on the sidewalk.

== Discipline involving "serious sin" ==
Jehovah's Witnesses consider many actions to be "serious sins", for which baptized Witnesses are subject to a committee hearing, which may result in shunning. Such actions include:

- abortion
- adultery
- apostasy
- bestiality
- encouraging the celebration of birthdays or other prohibited celebrations
- blood transfusions
- boxing
- "brazen conduct" or "loose conduct", including:
  - association with shunned non-relatives,
  - "spiritual" association with shunned relatives
  - openly criticizing a decision to remove a person from the congregation
  - child sexual abuse
  - dating while "not legally or Scripturally free to marry"
- cybersex or phone sex
- drug abuse
- public drunkenness
- extortion
- fornication
- fraud
- gambling
- gluttony
- greed
- celebrating religious and national holidays
- homosexual activity
- hypnotism
- idolatry
- incest
- interfaith activity
- lying
- manslaughter
- joining the military
- murder
- physical uncleanness (extreme)
- political activities
- polygamy
- hardcore pornography
- refusal to provide for family
- remarriage "if adultery and rejection by the innocent mate had not occurred"
- slander
- spiritism
- subversive, antigovernment activity
- theft
- the use of tobacco
- verbal abuse
- violence
- voting in political elections

=== Judicial situations ===
If an active baptized Witness is considered to have committed a "serious sin" for which the individual must demonstrate formal repentance, correction (or, "discipline") is administered by the congregation's body of elders. Such situations usually involve a committee of three or more elders. Counsel may escalate to excommunication, which includes shunning by the congregation. Shunned individuals may be reinstated after an extended period if they are deemed to demonstrate repentance.

An individual may also be shunned for promoting activities that are considered "serious sins" without actually engaging in the practice, or for accepting related employment (e.g. selling lottery tickets, firearms, or cigarettes; working in an abortion clinic, church or military base).

If a baptized Witness teaches contrary to Witness doctrines, it is considered apostasy and grounds for shunning. A 1981 letter to overseers—reproduced in a book by former Governing Body member Raymond Franz—directed that a member who rejects Jehovah's Witnesses' teachings and "persists in believing other doctrine", even without promoting such beliefs, may also be subject to shunning. Elders usually try to reason with the individual before such action is taken. If a person believes that a teaching should be adjusted or changed, he is encouraged "to be patient and wait on Jehovah for change". The Watchtower of July 15, 2011, said "apostates are 'mentally diseased,' and they seek to infect others with their disloyal teachings" and to "avoid contact with them". Some have stated that this applies to all individuals who leave the organization.

=== Procedures ===
Evidence for actions that can result in congregational discipline is obtained by voluntary confession to the elders or by witnesses of the violation. A minimum of two witnesses is required to establish guilt, based on their understanding of Deuteronomy 17:6 and Matthew 18:16, unless the person confesses voluntarily. Members are instructed to report serious sins committed by other members. Failure to report a serious sin of another member is viewed as sharing in the sins of others, a sin before God. Witnesses are instructed that pledges of confidentiality may be broken to report what they believe to be transgressions.

A congregation's body of elders considers confessions or credible allegations of serious sin and decides whether a committee will be formed to address the matter. A judicial committee, usually consisting of three elders, investigates the details of the alleged sin further. The committee arranges a formal hearing to determine the circumstances of the sin, whether the accused is repentant, and whether disciplinary actions will be taken.

In certain situations, a body of elders may handle a situation involving "serious sin" by a baptized Witness without a committee:

- Minor or newly baptized—A minor or newly baptized Witness might commit one or two acts of "serious sin" involving tobacco or overdrinking; repercussions as for 'non-judicial' situations may still be imposed.
- Repentance—The body of elders may believe the sinner's repentance has been established and accepted. For example, if a member committed a "serious sin" several years ago, had formally repented in prayer, and the sin did not involve scheming. Witnesses are strongly discouraged from waiting years to resolve such matters; even if years have passed since the serious sin, it is typical for a committee to be formed, and there may still be repercussions as for ‘non-judicial’ situations.
- Judicial abeyance—Elders may become aware of a "serious sin" committed by a baptized Witness who has been inactive for some time and is not perceived as a Jehovah's Witness. If the alleged sinner is not associating with active Witnesses, the elders may indefinitely postpone a committee and formal hearing unless and until the individual renews their association with the congregation.

=== Judicial committee ===
A person who confesses or is accused of a serious sin is invited to attend a meeting with a committee of elders. The individual is permitted to bring witnesses who can speak in their defense; observers are not allowed, and the hearing is held privately even if the accused individual requests that it be heard openly so all may witness the evidence. Recording devices are not permitted at the hearing. If the accused repeatedly fails to attend an arranged hearing, the committee will proceed but will not make a decision until evidence and testimony by witnesses are considered.

The committee takes the role of prosecutor, judge, and jury when handling its cases. After the hearing is opened with a prayer, the accused is invited to make a personal statement. If there is no admission of guilt, the individual is informed of the source of the charges, and witnesses are presented one at a time to give evidence. Witnesses do not remain present for the entire hearing. Once all the evidence is presented, the accused and all witnesses are dismissed and the committee reviews the evidence and the attitude of the accused.

The committee may determine that there was no "serious sin", or that mitigating circumstances absolve the accused individual. The committee may then proceed with discipline such as is described for 'non-judicial' situations. Alternatively, the committee may decide that a serious sin was committed, in which case, the committee gives verbal admonitions and gauges the individual's attitude and repentance. The committee then decides whether discipline will involve formal reproof or shunning.

=== Reproof ===
Reproof involves actions for which a person could be removed from the congregation, and is said to be an effort to 'reach the heart' and convince a person of the need to hate the sanctioned actions and repent. Reproof is considered sufficient if the individual is deemed repentant. Reproof is given before all who are aware of the transgression. If the conduct is known only to the individual and the committee, reproof is given privately. If the sin is known by a small number, they would be invited by the elders, and reproof would be given before the sinner and those with knowledge of the sin. If the action is known generally by the entire congregation or the wider community, an announcement is made at the midweek meeting that the person "has been reproved". A related local needs talk may be given, separately from the announcement, without naming anyone.

In all cases of reproof, restrictions are imposed, typically prohibiting the individual from sharing in meeting parts, commenting during meetings, and giving group prayers. A reproved Witness cannot enroll as a pioneer or auxiliary pioneer for at least one year after reproof is given.

=== Shunning ===
All members are expected to abide by the beliefs and moral standards of Jehovah's Witnesses. Serious violations of these requirements can result in shunning (a form of excommunication). For many years, the practice was referred to as "disfellowshipping"; however, the term was discontinued in 2024, and is instead referred to as removal from the congregation. If an elder committee decides that a baptized Witness has committed a serious sin and the person is deemed unrepentant after repeated counsel, the individual is removed. A person who believes that a serious error in judgment has been made may appeal the decision. Requests for appeal must be made in writing and within seven days of the decision of the committee. At such times, they may use other local elders or elders from nearby congregations. The policy is based on their interpretation of scriptures such as 1 Corinthians 5:11–13; Matthew 18:15–17; and 2 John 9–11. Witness literature states that avoiding interaction with former adherents helps to:

- avoid reproach on God's name and organization by indicating that violations of the Bible's standards in their ranks are not tolerated;
- keep the congregation free of possible corrosive influences; and
- convince the individual to re-evaluate their course of action, repent, and rejoin the denomination.

Shunning is also practiced when a member formally resigns membership or is deemed to indicate by their actions—such as accepting a blood transfusion or association with another religion or military organization—that they do not wish to be known as a Witness. Such individuals are said to have disassociated, and are described by the Watch Tower Society as "lawless".

When a person is removed or is deemed to have disassociated, an announcement is made at the next midweek meeting that the named individual "is no longer one of Jehovah's Witnesses", without any elaboration. Shunning starts immediately after the announcement is made. A notification form is sent to the local branch office and records of the removal are saved in the congregational records. Both are kept until at least five years after reinstatement.

Failure to adhere to the directions on shunning is itself considered a serious offense. Members who continue to socialize with a removed or disassociated person are said to be sharing in their "wicked works" and may themselves be removed. Exceptions are made in some cases, such as business relations and immediate family household situations. If a former member is living in the same home with other baptized family members, religious matters are not discussed, with the exception of minors, for whose training parents are still responsible; expelled family members outside the home are shunned. For many years, members were instructed to not even greet shunned individuals. Since March 2024, members are permitted to invite shunned individuals to congregation meetings or offer brief greetings at meetings, unless the individual is deemed to be an apostate.

==== Reinstatement ====
Removed individuals may be reinstated into the congregation if they are considered repentant of their previous actions and attitudes. If a disassociated or removed individual requests reinstatement, a committee (preferably comprising the original committee members, if available) seeks to determine whether the person has repented. Such individuals must demonstrate that they no longer practice the conduct for which they were expelled from the congregation, as well as submission to the denomination's regulations. Individuals removed for actions no longer considered serious sins are not automatically reinstated. Attending meetings regularly while being shunned is a requirement for eventual reinstatement. Once a decision is made to reinstate, a brief announcement is made to the congregation that the individual "is reinstated as one of Jehovah's Witnesses".

Elders are instructed to remind disfellowshipped individuals of the steps they can take to qualify for reinstatement. No specific period of time is prescribed before this can happen; however, the Watch Tower Society suggests a period of "perhaps many months, a year, or longer." Congregational restrictions are imposed on reinstated individuals. Participation at religious meetings, including comments from the audience, is initially not permitted; such "privileges" may be gradually permitted over time if the individual is considered to have "progressed spiritually". Depending on the reason for expulsion, reinstated individuals may be ineligible for many years from serving in positions of responsibility such as an elder, ministerial servant, or pioneer.

== Unbaptized publishers ==
An unbaptized individual who has previously been approved to share in Jehovah's Witnesses' formal ministry, but who subsequently behaves in a manner considered inappropriate may lose privileges, such as commenting at meetings, receiving assignments, or even accompanying the congregation in the public ministry.

If an unbaptized individual is deemed unrepentant of actions for which baptized members might be removed, an announcement would be made that the person "is no longer a publisher of the good news." Such individuals were previously shunned, but formal restrictions are no longer imposed on unbaptized individuals, though association is generally curtailed. The elders might privately warn individuals in the congregation if the unbaptized person is considered to pose "an unusual threat".

== Critical view ==
The only ways to officially leave Jehovah's Witnesses are to disassociate or to be removed, and both entail the same set of prohibitions and penalties, with no provision for continued normal association. Jehovah's Witnesses state that their practice of shunning is a scripturally documented method to protect the congregation from the influence of those who practice serious wrongdoing. Critics contend that the judicial process itself, due to its private and nearly autonomous nature, directly contradicts the precedent found in the Bible and the organization's own teachings and can be used in an arbitrary manner if there is consensus among just a few to abuse their authority.

According to Raymond Franz, a letter dated September 1, 1980, from the Watch Tower Society to all circuit and district overseers advised that a member who "merely disagrees in thought with any of the Watch Tower Society's teachings is committing apostasy and is liable for disfellowshipping." The letter states that one does not have to "promote" different doctrines to be an apostate, adding that elders need to "discern between one who is a trouble-making apostate and a Christian who becomes weak in the faith and has doubts, emphasizing that the latter should be patiently and lovingly assisted." Subsequent Watch Tower publications have clarified the distinction between sincere doubts and deliberate promotion of teachings contrary to the organization's beliefs. A 2000 issue of The Watchtower instructed elders not to be hasty in viewing those who raise questions or struggle with doubts as apostates, and to assist those who have doubts with mercy and mildness.

== Legality ==
In the June 1987 case Paul v. Watchtower Bible and Tract Society of New York Inc., the United States Court of Appeals for the 9th Circuit upheld the Witnesses' right to shun those who fail to live by the denomination's standards, upholding the ruling of a lower court. The court stated:

Shunning is a practice engaged in by Jehovah's Witnesses pursuant to their interpretation of canonical text, and we are not free to reinterpret that text. ... We find the practice of shunning not to constitute a sufficient threat to the peace, safety, or morality of the community as to warrant state intervention. ... Courts generally do not scrutinize closely the relationship among members (or former members) of a church. Churches are afforded great latitude when they impose discipline on members or former members.

In a review of the case, the 1988 Washington University Law Quarterly remarked:

The Ninth Circuit's extension of the free exercise clause to include a privilege against tort liability is incorrect. ... In most of the free exercise cases decided by the Supreme Court the government has acted against the religious group, either by imposing criminal sanctions for religious conduct or denying members some benefit because of their religious beliefs. In Paul, however, the religious group acted as the aggressor, violating the plaintiff's right to emotional well-being. ... The Paul decision is an unfortunate expansion of a doctrine intended to protect individual rights.

On May 31, 2018, the Supreme Court of Canada issued a 9–0 decision saying courts have no jurisdiction to review membership questions of a religious organization. "In the end, religious groups are free to determine their own membership and rules; courts will not intervene in such matters save where it is necessary to resolve an underlying legal dispute," Justice Malcolm Rowe wrote in the decision.

In 2021, Belgium issued a €12,000 fine to Jehovah's Witnesses for discrimination and inciting hatred against people who left the religion. The fine was initially €96,000 before being reduced. Upon appeal by Jehovah's Witnesses, the fine was acquitted.

In 2022, a court case filed by a disfellowshipped woman was subjected to judicial review by the Supreme Court of Norway. Jehovah's Witnesses were denied funding as a religious community for 2021. A counter lawsuit was launched by Jehovah's Witnesses.

== See also ==
- Apostasy (2017 film)
- Disconnection (Scientology)
- Ostracism
- Silent treatment
- Church membership council
- Criticism of Jehovah's Witnesses
- Jehovah's Witnesses practices
