= The Watchtower =

Jehovah's Witnesses religious magazine

- Categories: Religious
- Frequency: Public Edition: annually Study Edition: monthly
- Circulation: Public Edition: 31.744 million (2025); Study Edition: 13.825 million (2018)
- Publisher: Watch Tower Bible and Tract Society of Pennsylvania
- First issue: July 1879; 147 years ago (as Zion's Watch Tower and Herald of Christ's Presence)
- Company: Jehovah's Witnesses
- Country: United States
- Based in: Warwick, New York, United States
- Language: Public Edition: 461 languages (2025); Study Edition: 541 languages (2025)
- Website: The Watchtower
- ISSN: 2325-5838

The Watchtower Announcing Jehovah's Kingdom, more commonly known as The Watchtower, is an illustrated religious magazine, published by the Watch Tower Bible and Tract Society of Pennsylvania. Jehovah's Witnesses distribute The Watchtower—Public Edition, along with its companion magazine, Awake!

The Watch Tower Society reports a circulation of 31.744 million per issue for The Watchtower—Public Edition in 461 languages, with one new issue produced annually. The Watchtower—Study Edition, used at congregation meetings, is published monthly.

== History ==
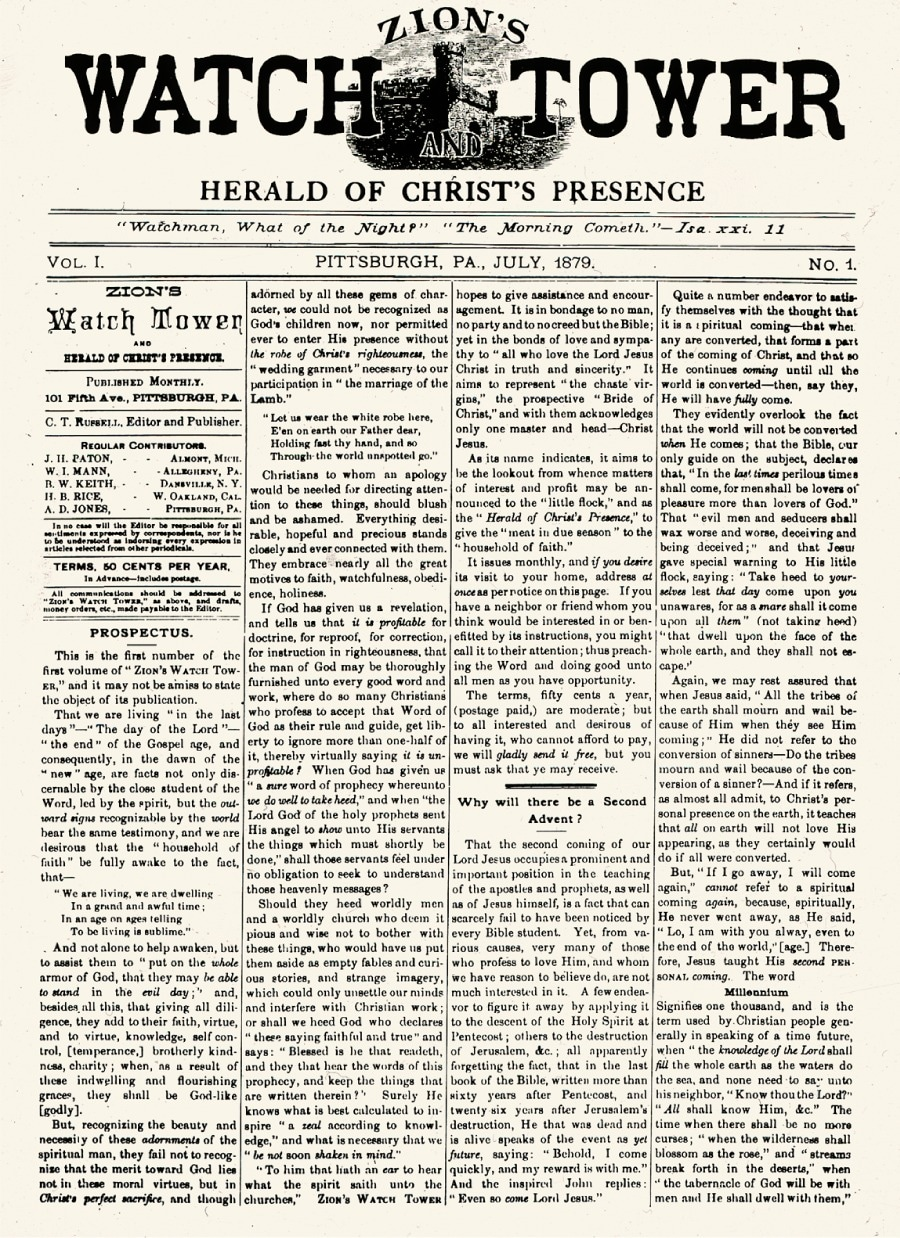
Zion's Watch Tower and Herald of Christ's Presence, July 1879

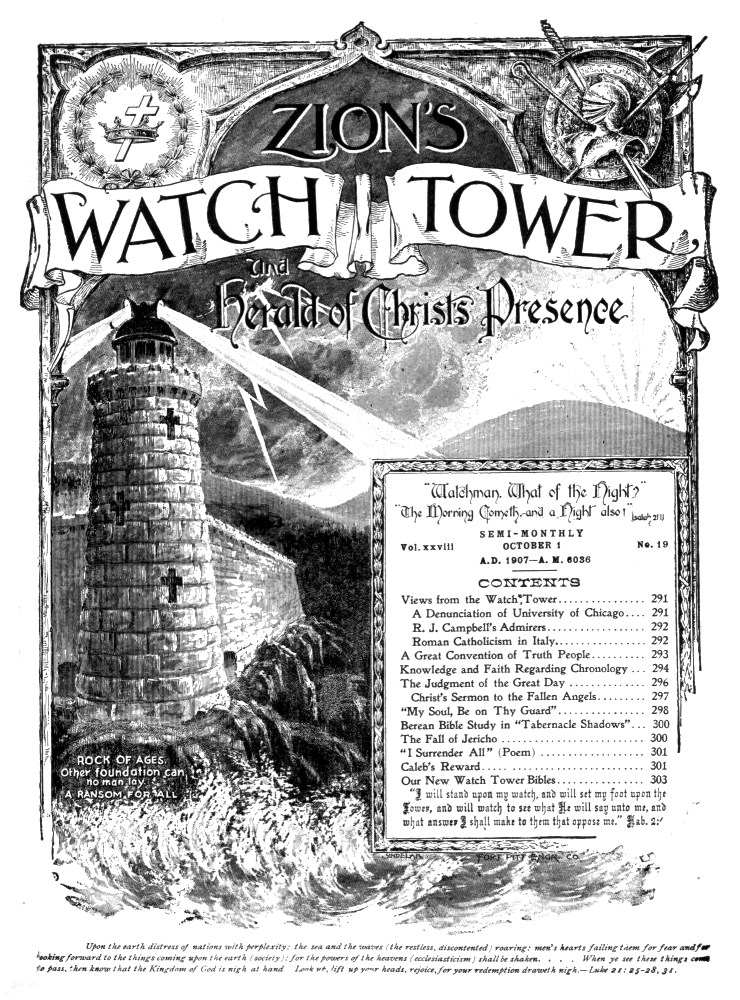
Zion's Watch Tower and Herald of Christ's Presence, October 1, 1907

The magazine was started by Charles Taze Russell in July 1879 under the title Zion's Watch Tower and Herald of Christ's Presence. According to its first issue, the magazine's original purpose was to draw attention to Russell's belief that people of the time were "living 'in the last days' 'the day of the Lord'—'the end' of the Gospel age," and that "the dawn of the 'new' age, are facts not only discernible by the close student of the Word, led by the spirit, but the outward signs recognizable by the world bear the same testimony."

In 1909, the name was changed to The Watch Tower and Herald of Christ's Presence. In 1920, the Watch Tower Society reprinted all issues from 1879–1919 in seven volumes, known as the Watchtower Reprints, which have since been reprinted by various Bible Student groups. On October 15, 1931, the magazine was renamed The Watchtower and Herald of Christ's Presence; on January 1, 1939, The Watchtower and Herald of Christ's Kingdom; from March 1, 1939 until the present, its full name has been The Watchtower Announcing Jehovah's Kingdom.

== Content ==
Articles are submitted by writing committees from worldwide branch offices, which are then checked by editors and translated into the languages of publication; all involved are volunteers. Women are permitted to write articles that are not of a doctrinal nature. The names of the authors (except in first-person life stories), and other publishing staff are not provided. The Watchtower is overseen by the Writing Committee of the Governing Body of Jehovah's Witnesses.

The Watchtower is the official means of sharing Jehovah's Witness beliefs, and includes articles relating to biblical prophecies, Christian conduct and morals, and the history of religion and the Bible. It is intended to draw attention to the kingdom of God, which Jehovah's Witnesses believe is a real government that will soon replace all earthly governments. According to the magazine's mission statement:

THIS MAGAZINE, The Watchtower, honors Jehovah God, the Ruler of the universe. It comforts people with the good news that God's heavenly Kingdom will soon end all wickedness and transform the earth into a paradise. It promotes faith in Jesus Christ, who died so that we might gain everlasting life and who is now ruling as King of God's Kingdom. This magazine has been published continuously since 1879 and is nonpolitical. It adheres to the Bible as its authority.

Previously, each issue of the Watchtower contained study articles and other regular features and was distributed to the general public. In 2008, content was divided into a Public Edition distributed to non-Witnesses and a Study Edition, which contains "pointed information prepared especially for Jehovah's Witnesses".

=== Public Edition ===
The Public Edition of The Watchtower contains biblical articles relating to a theme shown on the cover. In January 2013, The Watchtower—Public Edition was reduced from 32 to 16 pages, with greater focus on the official Jehovah's Witnesses website. Initially issued monthly, as of January 2016, the Public Edition was published every two months, and was further reduced to three issues per year as of January 2018. In 2022, publication was reduced to one new issue per year.

=== Study Edition ===
The Study Edition contains study articles written for the Watchtower Study, as well as other intra-organizational information directed to current and prospective members.

Congregations of Jehovah's Witnesses worldwide discuss the same article each week at the Watchtower Study. At this meeting, each paragraph is read aloud by a designated reader; the study conductor then asks questions printed at the bottom of the page for each paragraph and calls on members of the congregation to answer the questions based on the printed information. They are encouraged to put the information in their own words and to "draw attention to scripture application, supporting arguments, or practical application of the material."

A separate Simplified version of the Study Edition was introduced in July 2011 but was discontinued in 2019.

== Distribution ==
The magazine is printed in nineteen countries. As of 2025, each issue of the Public Edition has an average circulation of 31.744 million copies in 461 languages. The monthly production of the Study Edition is not stated in the English edition; in January 2018 the Russian edition stated a circulation of 13.825 million. The Study Edition is published in 541 languages.

The Public Edition is distributed by Jehovah's Witnesses in the course of their public ministry including door-to-door canvassing, approaching people in public places, given informally to acquaintances and professionals, or left as reading material in waiting areas. The Study Edition is generally distributed only to members but is made available to members of the public attending the study of The Watchtower at congregation meetings.

The magazine has been made available in various accessible formats. Selected articles were provided in Braille since 1960 with the full magazine available in 1979. It has also been made available in various audio formats since 1998. Jehovah's Witnesses' official website provides content from The Watchtower in various digital formats.

=== Cost ===
Until March 1990, The Watchtower was available for a small charge that varied over time and in different countries. For example, in the United States, the suggested donation per issue was $0.05 in 1950, gradually increasing to $0.25 in 1989. On January 17, 1990, the Supreme Court of the United States ruled against Jimmy Swaggart that sales of religious literature were subject to taxation, which introduced ambiguity into the formerly tax-free practice of suggesting a specific amount in exchange for the magazines. The Watch Tower Society supported Swaggart in the case, arguing that the perceived sale of religious literature should be exempt from taxation.

From March 1, 1990, the magazines were made available at no cost, on a freewill donation basis in the United States, with the stated purpose of simplifying their Bible educational work and distinguishing themselves from those who commercialize religion. An article in the May 1990 issue of Our Kingdom Ministry—a newsletter provided to members—stated that "there are growing pressures against all religious elements" and went on to say that their main concern was to move ahead in the worldwide preaching work, "without hindrance."

The sale of Jehovah's Witnesses' literature was gradually phased out in other countries, and The Watchtower has been distributed free of charge worldwide since January 2000, its printing being funded by voluntary donations from Jehovah's Witnesses and members of the public.

== See also ==
- Jehovah's Witnesses publications
