= Raymond Franz =

Critic and former member of Jehovah's Witnesses (1922–2010)

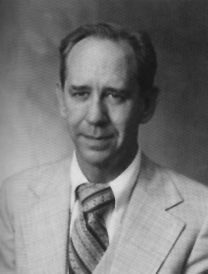
- Born: Raymond Victor Franz; May 8, 1922; Cincinnati, Ohio, US
- Died: June 2, 2010 (aged 88); Winston, Georgia, US
- Burial place: Colestown Cemetery, Cherry Hill Township
- Education: Gilead School
- Occupation: Jehovah's Witnesses governing body member
- Years active: 1971 – 1980
- Organization: Jehovah's Witnesses
- Known for: Former member of Jehovah's Witnesses
- Notable work: Crisis of Conscience (1983)
- Spouse: Cynthia Badame (m. 1959) (August 15, 1935 – 29 December 2013 (aged 78))
- Relatives: Frederick Franz (uncle)

Raymond Victor Franz (May 8, 1922 – June 2, 2010) was a member of the Governing Body of Jehovah's Witnesses from October 20, 1971, until his removal on May 22, 1980, and served at the organization's world headquarters for fifteen years, from 1965 until 1980. Franz stated that the request for his resignation and his subsequent disfellowshipping resulted from allegations of apostasy. Following his removal, Franz wrote two books sharing his personal experiences with the Watch Tower Bible and Tract Society and his views on Jehovah's Witnesses' teachings.

== Watch Tower career ==
Franz was born on May 8, 1922 in Cincinnati (Ohio). His uncle, Frederick Franz, was influential in the denomination's development, practices and doctrines. His father was associated with the Bible Student movement (from which Jehovah's Witnesses developed) and was baptized in 1913. Franz joined the Jehovah's Witnesses in 1938, and became a baptized member in 1939. In June 1940, after graduating from high school, Franz began serving as a full-time minister.

In 1944, Franz graduated from Gilead, the group's school for training missionaries, and temporarily served the organization as a traveling representative in the continental United States until he received a missionary assignment and transferred to Puerto Rico in 1946. Franz became a representative of Jehovah's Witnesses throughout the Caribbean, traveling to the Virgin Islands and the Dominican Republic, until at least 1957 when Jehovah's Witnesses were banned in the Dominican Republic by dictator Rafael Trujillo. While Franz was serving as a missionary in Puerto Rico, he was instructed to submit a personal request to the president to lift the ban, which he successfully did in 1956.

At the age of 37, Franz married Cynthia Badame on February 28, 1959, and she joined him in his missionary work. Both returned to the Dominican Republic in 1961, to evangelize for four more years and were then assigned to Watch Tower headquarters in Brooklyn, New York.

According to Franz, he began working in the organization's writing department and was assigned to collaboratively write Aid to Bible Understanding, the first religious encyclopedia published by Jehovah's Witnesses. On October 20, 1971, he was appointed to the Governing Body of the religious organization.

== Changed views ==
In his personal memoir, Franz said that at the end of 1979 he reached a personal crossroad:

I had spent nearly forty years as a full time representative, serving at every level of the organizational structure. The last fifteen years I had spent at the international headquarters, and the final nine of those as a member of the worldwide Governing Body of Jehovah's Witnesses. It was those final years that were the crucial period for me. Illusions there met up with reality. I have since come to appreciate the rightness of a quotation I recently read, one made by a statesman, now dead, who said: "The great enemy of the truth is very often not the lie—deliberate, contrived and dishonest—but the myth—persistent, persuasive and unrealistic." I now began to realize how large a measure of what I had based my entire adult life course on was just that, a myth—persistent, persuasive and unrealistic.

He became frustrated by, in his view, the Governing Body's dogmatism and overemphasis on traditional views rather than reliance on the Bible in reaching doctrinal decisions. Consequently, Franz and his wife decided to leave the international headquarters in late 1979.

Raymond Franz rejected the doctrine of the dual hopes—the heavenly hope of the 144,000 and the earthly hope of the great crowd—maintaining instead that there is only a single heavenly hope for all Christians. He also disagreed with the group's biblical chronology and eschatological calculations. Franz posited that God does not maintain an institutionalized or organized populace on earth. Instead, he argued that Christian life is inherently decentralized, where individual conduct is guided by a personal relationship with the divine rather than by codified laws.

=== Disfellowshipping ===
In March 1980, Franz and his wife took a leave of absence from the world headquarters for health reasons and moved to Alabama, where he took up laboring work on a property owned by a fellow Witness. The following month, a committee of the Governing Body raised concerns about "wrong teachings" being spread by headquarters staff and began questioning staff about their beliefs. Staff were also questioned about comments Franz had made that may have contradicted Watch Tower doctrine.

The March 15, 1980 Issue of The Watchtower, released a statement of regret where its assertions of the probability of Armageddon arriving before 1975 had "apparently overshadowed the cautionary ones and contributed to a buildup of expectation already initiated." It told disappointed Jehovah's Witnesses, "including persons having to do with the publication of the information that contributed to the buildup of hopes centred on that date" to "concentrate on adjusting his viewpoint". This statement, which placed blame for the disappointment about 1975 on Raymond Franz as the former chairman of the writing committee, precipitated a purge of that committee. On May 8, 1980, Franz was told that he had been implicated as an apostate. He was called back to Brooklyn on May 20 for two days of questioning by the Chairman's Committee. According to Franz, the discussion involved allegations that some Witnesses were meeting privately to discuss various teachings of the Watch Tower Society that may have constituted apostasy.

On May 21, 1980, Franz was called to a Governing Body session where he was questioned for three hours about his biblical viewpoints and commitment to Watch Tower doctrines. Consequently, he agreed to a request to resign from the Governing Body and headquarters staff. Franz refused the Watch Tower Society's offer of a monthly stipend as a member of the "Infirm Special Pioneers". The Governing Body investigation resulted in the disfellowshipping of several other headquarters staff.

On September 1, 1980, the Governing Body distributed a letter to all Circuit and District overseers stating that apostates need not be promoting doctrines to be disfellowshipped. The letter stated that individuals who persisted in "believing other doctrine despite scriptural reproof" were also apostatizing and therefore warranted "appropriate judicial action".

On March 18, 1981, Franz' employer in Alabama submitted a letter of disassociation from Jehovah's Witnesses. The September 15, 1981, issue of The Watchtower announced a change of policy on disassociation, directing that those who formally withdrew from the group were to be shunned by Witnesses in the same manner as those who have been disfellowshipped. Franz, who continued to socialize with his employer, was summoned to a judicial hearing on November 25 and disfellowshipped for disobeying the edict. Determined to present his point of view, not only with respect to his having been disfellowshipped, but with respect to broader doctrinal issues, in 1982 he sent Heather and Gary Botting proofs of his book Crisis of Conscience so that they could chronicle the more widespread discord within the Watch Tower Society. They wrote regarding Franz' contribution to their exposé on the Witnesses that his recommendations "undoubtedly strengthened the veracity of the text; we were impressed by his insistence on both fairness and frankness with respect to representing the view of the Watch Tower Society."

After he was disfellowshipped, Franz published two books—Crisis of Conscience (1983) and In Search of Christian Freedom (1991)—presenting detailed accounts of his experiences as a Jehovah's Witness, a Governing Body member, and his experiences throughout various levels of the organization.

== Death ==
On May 30, 2010, at age 88, Franz fell and suffered a brain hemorrhage. He died on June 2, 2010.

== Works ==
- Franz, Raymond (1983). Crisis of Conscience. Commentary Press. ISBN 9780914675006.
  - —————— (2002). Crisis of Conscience (4th ed.). Commentary Press. ISBN 0-914675-23-0.
- ——————— (1991). In Search of Christian Freedom. Commentary Press. ISBN 978-0914675167.

== See also ==
- Jehovah's Witnesses and congregational discipline

== Bibliography ==
- Beverley, James A. (1986). Crisis of Allegiance. Burlington, Ontario: Welch Publishing Company. ISBN 0-920413-37-4.
- Botting, Heather; Botting, Gary (1984). The Orwellian World of Jehovah's Witnesses. University of Toronto Press. ISBN 0-8020-6545-7.
- Chryssides, George D. (May 15, 2019). "Franz, Raymond (1922–)". Historical Dictionary of Jehovah's Witnesses. Historical Dictionaries of Religions, Philosophies, and Movements Series (2 ed.). Bloomsbury Publishing USA. p. 116. ISBN 9798216207979.
- Chryssides, George D. (2009). "Franz, Raymond (1922–)". The A to Z of Jehovah's Witnesses. The A to Z Guide Series. Bloomsbury Publishing USA. pp. 57–58. ISBN 9798216245155.
- Dart, John (August 27, 1987). "Church Told to Break Privacy". Los Angeles Times. Archived from the original on December 24, 2014.
- Kraslow, David (March 19, 1983). "Expelled Witnesses Claim Group is Ingrown". The Miami News. Miami, Florida: 17.
- Ostling, Richard (February 22, 1982). "Witness Under Prosecution". Time Magazine. Archived from the original on December 22, 2007.
- Penton, M. J. (1997). Apocalypse Delayed (2nd ed.). University of Toronto Press. ISBN 0-8020-7973-3.
- Rogerson, Alan (1969). Millions Now Living Will Never Die: A Study of Jehovah's Witnesses. Constable & Co, London. ISBN 0-0945-5940-6.

Watch Tower Sources

- Writing Committee of the Governing Body of Jehovah's Witnesses (1972). "Dominican Republic". Yearbook of Jehovah's Witnesses. Watch Tower Bible and Tract Society. p. 158.
- Writing Committee of the Governing Body of Jehovah's Witnesses (November 1, 1976). "Gilead's 61st Graduation a Spiritual Treat". The Watchtower. Watch Tower Bible and Tract Society. p. 671-672.
- Writing Committee of the Governing Body of Jehovah's Witnesses (March 15, 1980). "Choosing the Best Way of Life § Hold to Your Choice!". The Watchtower. Watch Tower Bible and Tract Society.
- Writing Committee of the Governing Body of Jehovah's Witnesses (1980b). "August". Our Kingdom Ministry (8). Watch Tower Bible and Tract Society.
- Writing Committee of the Governing Body of Jehovah's Witnesses (September 15, 1981). "Disfellowshiping — How to View It". The Watchtower. Watch Tower Bible and Tract Society. p. 23.
