= Jehovah's Witnesses publications =

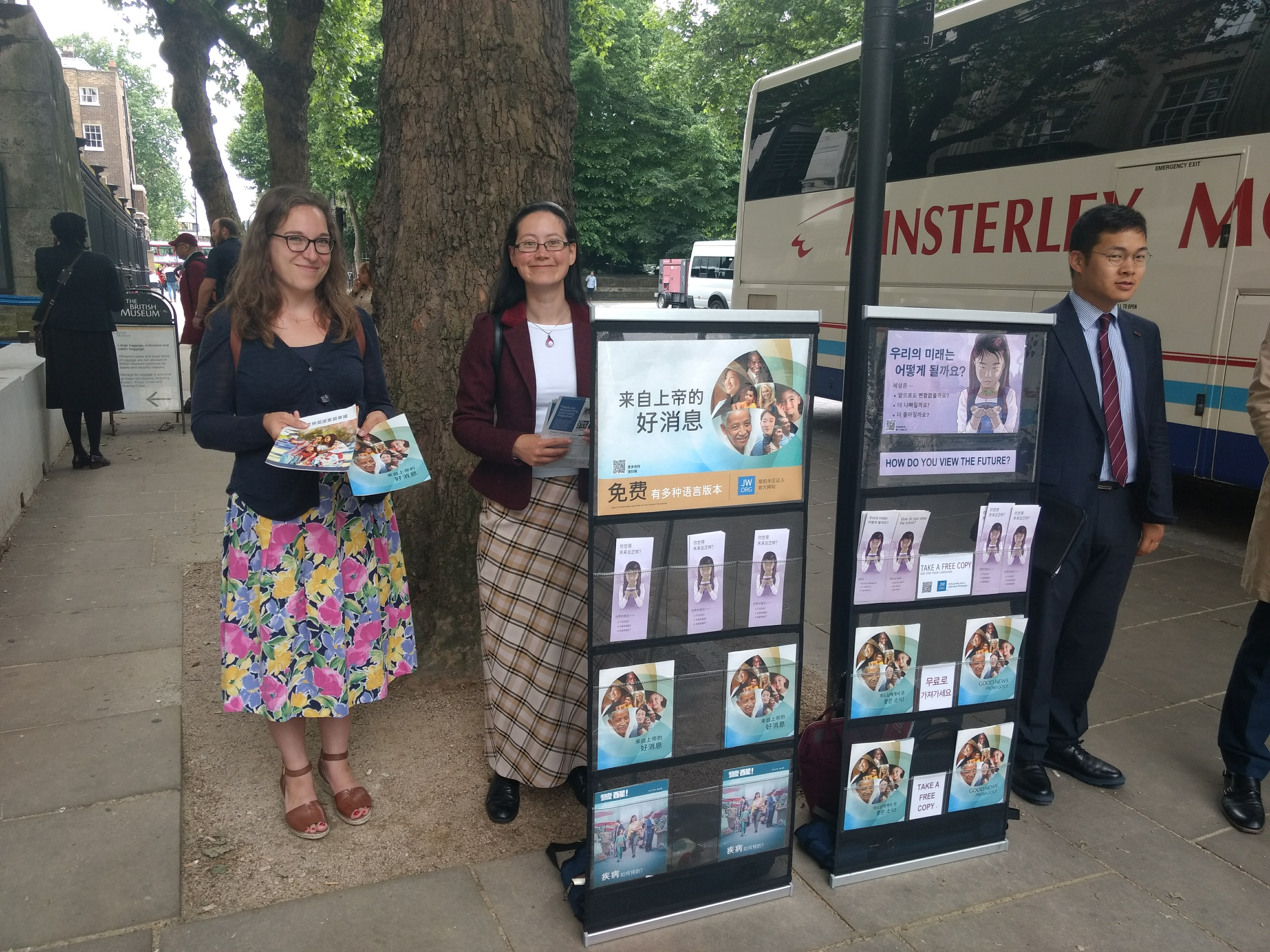
Jehovah's Witnesses outside the British Museum, featuring pamphlets in Chinese and Korean

The Watch Tower Bible and Tract Society produces a significant amount of printed and electronic literature, primarily for use by Jehovah's Witnesses. Their best-known publications are the magazines The Watchtower and Awake!

Zion's Watch Tower was first published by Charles Taze Russell, founder of the Bible Student movement, in 1879, followed by the inception of the Watch Tower Society in 1881. Supporters adopted the name Jehovah's witnesses in 1931. Particularly since 2001, when referring to other Watch Tower Society publications their literature has typically stated that it is "published by Jehovah's Witnesses", though the edition notice identifies the publisher as the Watch Tower Society.

Along with books and brochures, other media were also produced, including CDs, MP3s and DVDs. Internet downloads and video streaming are still made available on the Watch Tower Society's official website. New publications are sometimes released at the Watch Tower Society's annual meetings.

== Literature for preaching ==
Most literature produced by Jehovah's Witnesses is intended for use in their evangelizing work. Publications for preaching are also routinely studied by members, both privately and at their meetings for worship. Their most widely distributed publications are:

- New World Translation of the Holy Scriptures (NWT), a translation of the Bible published in whole or part in over 352 languages. This is the Bible translation primarily used by Jehovah's Witnesses.
- Awake!, published in over 100 languages once per year, a general-interest annual magazine covering many topics from a religious perspective.
- The Watchtower Announcing Jehovah's Kingdom, published in 413 languages annually, focuses mainly on doctrine.

When interested individuals are encountered, Witnesses offer a home Bible study course, using a current publication, such as Enjoy Life Forever!—An Interactive Bible Course, which outlines their primary beliefs and interpretations of the Bible. The Witness then visits the student on a regular basis, generally considering a chapter on each visit. Students are requested to examine the material prior to the arrival of the Bible study conductor, using the questions at the bottom of each page, to "help prepare the student for the Bible study".

Jehovah's Witnesses customarily read each paragraph aloud together with the student, and then ask the question(s) provided for that paragraph. Students are encouraged to read the scriptures cited in the material. The goal of the course is for the student to be baptized as a Jehovah's Witness.

Jehovah's Witnesses previously offered their literature for a price determined by the branch office in each country, to cover printing costs. Since 2000, Jehovah's Witnesses have offered their publications free of charge globally. Printing is funded by voluntary donations from Witnesses and members of the public. Jehovah's Witnesses accept donations if offered by householders.

== Literature for members ==
Some publications, such as the hymnal Sing to Jehovah, The Watchtower Study Edition, and the textbook Benefit From Theocratic Ministry School Education are for use by those who attend congregation meetings. Others, such as the organizational manual Organized to Do Jehovah's Will and Watchtower Library (containing the Watch Tower Publications Index from 1930, issues of The Watchtower since 1950, and most other Watch Tower Society literature published since 1970), are intended for members. Certain publications are limited to members in appointed positions, such as the manual for congregation elders, "Shepherd the Flock of God".

Some publications are typically distributed only to members, but may be supplied to other interested individuals on request or made available in public libraries. These include the Bible encyclopedia Insight on the Scriptures and Jehovah's Witnesses' official history book Jehovah's Witnesses—Proclaimers of God's Kingdom. Many of these publications are also available from their website in the Watchtower Online Library.

== Notable publications ==
In addition to Jehovah's Witnesses' widely distributed magazines, various publications have received attention from the media and other commentators.

=== Aid to Bible Understanding ===
Aid to Bible Understanding was the first doctrinal and biblical encyclopedia of Jehovah's Witnesses, published in full in 1971. Raymond Franz, a former member of the Governing Body who left the organization claimed to have been one of the researchers. Research for the book led to new interpretations of some concepts, providing a catalyst for changes in doctrine. It was replaced in 1988 by Insight on the Scriptures, which contains much of the original content from Aid to Bible Understanding.

=== Life—How Did It Get Here? By Evolution or by Creation? ===
Life—How Did It Get Here? By Evolution or by Creation?, first published in 1985, presents the Old Earth (Gap and Day-Age) creationism of Jehovah's Witnesses, and their criticism of evolution. Biologist Richard Dawkins criticized the book for repeatedly presenting a choice between intelligent design and chance, rather than natural selection. The book was supplemented by the 1998 book, Is There a Creator Who Cares About You?, and the 2010 brochures The Origin of Life—5 Questions Worth Asking and Was Life Created?

=== The Truth That Leads to Eternal Life ===
The Truth That Leads to Eternal Life was a Bible study textbook published in 1968 and revised in 1981 (now out of print). The 1975 Guinness Book of Records included this book in its list of highest printings. According to the Watch Tower Society, by 1992, publication had reached 107,553,888 copies in 117 languages.

== See also ==
- The Photo-Drama of Creation – film produced by the Watch Tower Bible and Tract Society under Charles Taze Russell
