= Development of Jehovah's Witnesses doctrine =

The doctrines of Jehovah's Witnesses have developed since the publication of The Watchtower magazine began in 1879. Early doctrines were based on interpretations of the Bible by Watch Tower Bible & Tract Society founder Charles Taze Russell, then added to, altered, or discarded by his successors, Joseph Rutherford and Nathan Knorr. Since 1976, doctrinal changes have been made at closed meetings of the group's Governing Body, whose decisions are described as "God's progressive revelations". These teachings are disseminated through The Watchtower, and at conventions and congregation meetings. Most members of the denomination outside the Governing Body play no role in the development of doctrines and are expected to adhere to all those decided at the Warwick, New York headquarters. Jehovah's Witnesses are taught to welcome doctrinal changes, regarding such "adjustments" as "new light" or "new understanding" from God and proving that they are on the "path of the righteous".

== Method of doctrinal development ==
Some core beliefs of Jehovah's Witnesses have remained unchanged throughout the group's history. Certain doctrines, particularly relating to biblical chronology, were based on what Russell called a "venerable tradition" that he conceded was not directly stated in scripture or confirmed by undisputable evidence, but "based on faith". Watch Tower publications claim that doctrinal changes and refinements result from a process of progressive revelation, in which God gradually reveals his will and purpose. Watch Tower literature has suggested such enlightenment results from the application of reason and study, the guidance of the holy spirit, and direction from Jesus Christ and angels.

Rutherford spoke of spiritual "lightning flashes in the temple". The Society claims its doctrine of the "great crowd" and "other sheep" were "revealed" to "God's earthly servants" in 1935. Witness literature has also described sudden changes in doctrines as "flashes of light" given by God through his Holy Spirit. A 1930 publication claimed God used "invisible deputies" and "invisible angels" to pass his "messages" to The Watchtower. The Watchtower told Witnesses it was not necessary for them to understand how this took place. A 1973 policy change to disfellowship tobacco users was explained as a decision that "Jehovah has brought to the attention of his 'holy' people".

Watch Tower publications often cite Proverbs 4:18, "The path of the righteous ones is like the bright light that is getting lighter and lighter until the day is firmly established" (New World Translation) when explaining the need to change doctrines. The organization's earlier literature has included claims that its predictions about dates such as 1925 were "indisputable", "absolutely and unqualifiedly correct" and bearing "the stamp of approval of Almighty God", but the Governing Body which was established later says its teachings are neither infallible nor divinely inspired.

Robert Crompton, author of a book on Watch Tower eschatology, has noted that it is difficult to trace the development of doctrines because explicit changes are often not identified in Jehovah's Witness literature, leaving readers to assume which details have been superseded. Edmond C. Gruss, a critic of the group, found that a 1943 Watch Tower Society publication that established a new creation chronology, changing the date of Adam's creation by 100 years, made no mention of the old time reckoning, which had previously been said to be "correct beyond a doubt".

== Watch Tower Society founding doctrines ==
From the first issue of Zion's Watch Tower in July 1879, Russell began publicising a number of doctrines, many of them drawn from Adventist teachings, including the atonement, resurrection, the soul, the invisible parousia (or return) of Christ and God's "plan of the ages". Russell taught that mankind was to be redeemed not from torment but from the death penalty that had been imposed on Adam and subsequently passed on to all his descendants. He wrote that Christ's "ransom for all" mentioned in 1 Timothy 2:5 would be applied to all humankind rather than just the righteously inclined. Christ's death provided the ransom payment to free humans from death. He believed an elect few would be resurrected to serve as a heavenly priesthood and all humans who had died would be resurrected to earth, which would be restored to Edenic perfection.

=== Millennialist teachings ===
The dominant and central theme of Russell's teachings concerned the timing, nature, and purpose of Christ's second coming. His beliefs on the timing of Christ's Advent and God's overarching plan for humans had gained their first exposure in Three Worlds and the Harvest of This World, a book he paid Millerite Adventist Nelson H. Barbour to write in 1877. Russell and Barbour parted company in 1879 and from 1886 Russell began writing his own books that further developed his Millennialist beliefs.

Russell's doctrines on the Millennium followed a tradition of interpretation of Scripture that had begun in the 1st century when Jewish rabbis sought to identify the due time for the appearance of the Messiah by interpreting the prophecy of the 70 weeks of years of Daniel 9:24–27. Their approach to prophetic interpretation was based on the Day-year principle, drawn from Ezekiel 4 and Numbers 14, in which one day in prophecy represents one year in fulfillment. Such teachings were revived and popularised in the early 19th century by American Adventist preacher William Miller.

Russell also incorporated Miller's teaching of types and antitypes, in which an actual historical situation (the type) prefigures a corresponding situation (the antitype), as well as a modified version of John Nelson Darby's teachings on dispensationalism. Russell modified Darby's teachings to create his own doctrine of parallel dispensations, in which the timing of certain events in the Jewish age are a prophetic indication of corresponding events at the close of the Gospel age. He believed the internal harmony of his "plan of the ages" proved its validity beyond reasonable doubt, noting that a change of just one year would destroy the parallelisms, and found further confirmation in internal measurements of the Great Pyramid of Giza, which he viewed as a divinely built supporting witness to the Bible.

The main points of his doctrines on Bible chronology were:

- Seventy weeks of years: Russell believed the Adventist interpretation of the prophecy of the 70 weeks "until Messiah the Prince" in Daniel 9:24–27 could be used to demonstrate the validity of the day-for-a-year rule. He took 454 BCE as the date of Artaxerxes' decree to rebuild Jerusalem, and by converting 69 weeks of seven days (483 days) to 483 years arrived at 29 CE as the beginning of Jesus' ministry. Christ's crucifixion took place at the midpoint of the 70th week; the covenant with the Jewish nation remained in force another "week" (seven years) from the beginning of his ministry and its end was signified by the conversion of Cornelius in 36, when the Gospel was taken to the Gentiles.
- Times of the Gentiles: Using the day-for-a-year rule, Russell adopted and adjusted the teachings of Miller and Englishman John Aquila Brown, who both taught that the chastisement of the Israelites "seven times" for their sins (at Leviticus 26) indicated a period of 2520 years—seven prophetic years of 360 days each. In Russell's chronology system, the period began with the deposing of Zedekiah, the last king of Judah, an event that marked the end of the typical Kingdom of God and the beginning of the consequent lease of earthly dominion to Gentile governments, as foretold in Ezekiel 21:25–27. Russell calculated that Zedekiah's removal occurred in 606 BCE, and therefore claimed the "times of the Gentiles" ran from that date until 1914, when the kingdom would be re-established on earth under Jewish leadership. The end of the Gentile times would be marked by a return of the Jews to Palestine. Russell believed the period was also one of degradation for mankind in general, which he believed was prefigured by the account in Daniel 4 of Nebuchadnezzar's dream of a great tree being cut down and restrained from growth for seven years.
- The time of the end: Miller had formulated doctrines drawn from Daniel 12:4, 9 on the "time of the end", when the meaning of certain prophecies would be finally revealed. Russell made a slight amendment to the teaching, explaining that it began in 1799 when French general Berthier entered Rome, abolished the papal government, and established the Republic of Italy. The "time of the end" would last 115 years to 1914. The 1799 date, in turn, had been established by linking the 1260 days of Revelation 11:3 with time periods mentioned in Daniel chapters 2, 7, and 12. Using the year-day principle, the period indicated 1260 years from 539 (when Justinian I recognised the pope as universal bishop) to 1799.
- Great Jubilee: Russell adopted and amended Miller's teaching of a secondary indicator of the due date for the Millennium. The ancient Jewish law provided for a series of sabbaths, each culminating in the Jubilee year in the 50th year when slaves were released and leased property returned to their rightful owners. Like Miller, Russell believed the arrangement foreshadowed the release of humans from the debt of sin and bondage through the intervention of Christ. He taught that the Millennium was the antitypical Great Jubilee (the 50th 50-year jubilee) and marked the beginning of the second presence of Christ. Using his calculations of the date of the last jubilee before the Jewish exile, he added 2500 years (50 x 50) and calculated it had begun at the end of 1874.
- The great sabbath: Russell embraced Miller's view that because "one day is with the Lord as a thousand years", the seventh thousand-year period after creation would be a 1000-year-long sabbath "day". But whereas Miller had believed 1843 was 6000 years after creation, Russell believed Adam was created in 4129 BC and calculated 1872 as the end of 6000 years. He thought it reasonable that Adam and Eve had lived two years in Eden before sinning, and thus calculated the 6000 years ran from the time sin entered the world to October 1874, when Christ had returned and the times of restitution began.
- Parallel dispensations: Russell expanded Darby's doctrine of dispensationalism, explaining that events that befell the Jewish nation were prophetic counterparts of events during the Gospel age, with the timing of those events also having prophetic significance. He argued that the Jews had enjoyed 1845 years of favor from the death of Jacob to 33 CE (the Jewish Age) and they would have to endure the same length of time in God's disfavor—thus from 33 to 1878 (the Gospel Age). The Jews' fall from favour was gradual, spanning 37 years from 33 to 70 when Jerusalem was destroyed, and that period corresponded to a gradual restoration of God's favour to them between 1878 and 1914. But although the Jewish nation's fall began in 33, God's favor towards individual Jews continued another 3½ years from Pentecost, during which time the gospel call was limited to Jews. That typified a 3½-year opportunity from 1878 until 1881 when the "high calling" or invitation to become joint heirs with Christ closed. The 3½-year period between Christ's anointing as Messiah and his riding into Jerusalem on an ass, being acclaimed as king, and cleansing the temple of money-changers typified the period between his parousia (1874) and his assuming kingly power and rejection of "nominal church systems" (1878). The 40-year "harvest" of the Jewish Age from 29 to 69 typified a 40-year harvest of the Gospel Age from 1874 to 1914. The Jews' expectation of the Messiah's arrival at the time of Jesus' birth, 30 years before his anointing, was correlated with the Great Disappointment, the failure of Miller's prediction of the second coming of Christ in 1844, 30 years before the date indicated by Russell's system.

== Timeline of doctrinal changes ==
A simplified chart of historical developments of major groups within Bible Students

The timeline below includes foundational doctrines published by the Watch Tower Society for the Bible Student movement prior to the formal separation of Jehovah's Witnesses as a distinct denomination in 1931.

=== Doctrines unchanged since 1879 ===
- Biblical infallibility. Early copies of Zion's Watch Tower and Herald of Christ's Presence made reference to the Bible as God's "infallible Word".
- Christ's return to earth was invisible. Russell claimed the Greek word parousia (Matthew 24:37) referred to a period of time, rendered more accurately as "presence" than "coming".
- Evolution is a teaching contrary to the Bible and denies the need of redemption by Christ.
- God's Kingdom is an organized heavenly government over earth, ruled by Jesus and the anointed.
- God's name is Jehovah. Watch Tower Society founder Charles Taze Russell used the name "Jehovah" occasionally, but not consistently when referring to God.
- Humans are created as living souls.
- Individuals who go to heaven are resurrected with spiritual bodies.
- Jesus Christ gave his human life as a ransom sacrifice; belief in Jesus necessary for salvation. Russell believed that God's design for mankind was a restitution or restoration to the perfection and glory lost in Eden. This depended on God providing a ransom for all mankind to release them from the inevitability of death. Christ became that ransom sacrifice.
- Paradise to be restored, saved humans to live forever.
- The dead are unconscious, awaiting resurrection. According to Russell, most references to "hell" in the New Testament were more accurately translated as "tomb".
- The timing of Christ's Second Coming, or "presence", can be calculated through Bible chronology.

=== 1880–1889 ===
- 1880: Clergy–laity distinction viewed as unscriptural.
- 1881: Faith alone is not enough for someone to become a joint heir with Christ in heaven, but also a life of "self-sacrifice in the service of the truth" is required.
- 1881: Rejection of the Trinity doctrine. Russell claimed the Trinity doctrine had "not a word of Scripture" to support it. He explained: "We understand the Scriptures to teach that the holy Spirit is not a separate and distinct person, but that it is the divine mind or influence—the motive power of Divinity exercised everywhere and for any purpose, at His pleasure." In 1877 N. H. Barbour criticized the anti-Trinitarian view of the Christadelphians; an 1880 book by Zion's Watch Tower writer J. H. Paton emphasised that the Holy Spirit was a person and early Watch Tower issues referred to the Holy Spirit as "he" and part of the "Divine Three".
- 1887: The New Covenant, which Russell had claimed since 1880 would be inaugurated only after the last of the 144,000 anointed Christians had been taken to heaven, was said to be "now in force".

=== 1890–1899 ===
- 1891: The "Time of the End" of Daniel 12:4 is identified as beginning in October 1799—when Napoleon invaded Egypt and ended the power of the papacy—and closing in 1914, at which point violent worldwide revolution would mark the end of the old world order and the beginning of a new one.
- 1891: Biblical rapture is not a sudden event. The anointed are changed into spirit form, throughout the whole period of Christ's presence, at the time of each one's physical death.
- 1891: God's throne is located in the Pleiades star cluster.
- 1897: "This generation" of Matthew 23:36 is defined as "people living contemporaneously."

=== 1900–1909 ===
- 1904: 144,000 "elect" to go to heaven. Russell believed God had chosen a "fixed and limited ... number who should constitute the New Creation of God". God had not foreordained individuals, but those who met his "moral qualities and heart measurements" would be chosen to go to heaven.
- 1904: "Great Company" of Revelation 7:9, 14 identified as a secondary spiritual class who have "insufficient zeal for the Lord, the Truth and the brethren" who are granted heavenly life, but on a lower spiritual plane. In heaven they serve as servants rather than kings and priests.
- 1904: Worldwide descent into anarchy and disintegration of human rule, previously predicted to occur in October 1914, changed to "after October 1914".
- 1907: The inauguration of the New Covenant was described as belonging "exclusively to the coming age." Russell began to teach that the "church" (144,000 anointed Christians) had no mediator, but itself joined Christ as a joint messiah and mediator during the millennium.

=== 1910–1919 ===
- 1914: The length of each creative 'day' of Genesis is defined as precisely 7000 years.
- 1914: Russell "by no means confident" 1914 would bring the upheaval he had predicted.
- 1916: The timing of Armageddon, previously claimed to have begun in 1874 and to culminate in 1914, changed to have begun in 1914.

==== Leadership change ====
In 1917, Joseph Rutherford gained control of the Watch Tower Society after the death of its founder, Charles Taze Russell, enabling him to consolidate authority and implement doctrinal changes that shaped the future direction of the organization.

- 1917: The seven angels, or "messengers", of Revelation chapters 1 and 2 identified as St. Paul, St. John, Arius, Peter Waldo, John Wycliffe, Martin Luther, and Charles Taze Russell.
- 1919: Preaching work displaces "character development" as the "chief concern" of Bible Students. Russell had taught that Christians should embark on the gradual process of "sanctification" and personality improvement to fight sinful inclinations. In 1919 The Watch Tower declared that the primary concern for Bible Students was to labor with God to find members of the elect class.

=== 1920–1929 ===
- 1920: Jesus Christ's crowning as king of God's kingdom, previously 1878, changed to 1914.
- 1920: The preaching of the gospel of the kingdom "in all the world for a witness unto all nations", (Matthew 24:14), previously claimed to have already been completed, identified as a work for modern-day anointed Christians.
- 1922: The establishment of God's kingdom over the earth, previously expected to result in the destruction of human governments and a "new rule of righteousness" by the end of 1914 changed to an invisible event in heaven in 1914.
- 1923: Limitations placed on the extent of Christ's ransom and resurrection hope. Russell had taught that Christ had provided a ransom for all; a 1923 Watch Tower article asserted that clergymen would not be resurrected and benefit from the ransom; later articles claimed that benefits of the ransom would also be denied to Adam and Eve; those who died in the Noachian flood; those who died at Sodom and Gomorrah; both the falls of Jerusalem and those who will die at Armageddon.
- 1923: "Sheep class", mentioned in Matthew 25:31–46 defined as those who do good to "elect" class and are rewarded by surviving Armageddon and gaining life under Christ's thousand-year reign. Russell had previously applied the parable to the work of dividing the people in the Millennial Age.
- 1925: Armageddon identified as a battle between God and Satan, resulting in the overthrow of human governments and false religion Armageddon had previously been understood to mean a "melee between contending forces of mankind", resulting in social revolution and political anarchy.
- 1925: Michael, the dragon and the man-child in Revelation chapter 12, previously defined as the Pope, the Roman Empire, and the papacy, redefined as Jesus, Satan, and the New Nation (or Kingdom), respectively.
- 1926: "Satan's organization" defined as the rulers of politics, commerce and religion and all their followers.
- 1927: "Faithful and wise servant" of Matthew 24:45–47, previously defined as Russell since 1897, changed to a "class" comprising all remaining "anointed" Christians.
- 1927: "First resurrection" of "sleeping saints", previously 1878, changed to 1918.
- 1927: "This generation" of Matthew 23:36, previously defined as "people living contemporaneously" changed to a remnant of the "anointed" on earth during Armageddon.
- 1927: Celebration of Christmas, previously embraced as a "tribute of respect" to Christ, discontinued as a "pagan celebration".
- 1928: Great Pyramid of Giza in Egypt, previously regarded as a testimony to the Bible and its chronology, declared to have no prophetic significance and built under the direction of Satan.
- 1929: Honoring of God's name described as "the outstanding issue facing all intelligent creation".
- 1929: "Superior authorities" of Romans 13:1 to whom Christians had to show subjection and obedience, previously defined as governmental authorities, redefined as God and Christ only. Secular state then regarded as demonic and almost without redeeming features.
- 1929: The "time of the end" of Daniel 12:4, previously defined as a 115-year period from 1799 to 1914, redefined as a period of unspecified length starting in 1914.

=== 1930–1939 ===
- 1930: Christ's parousia—his second coming or invisible "presence"—previously established as 1874 and reaffirmed as late as 1929, changed to 1914.
- 1931: The "seven stars", or angels of the seven congregations in Revelation, previously identified as seven historical Christian teachers, identified as heavenly angels attending Jesus Christ at the temple and ministering to his followers on earth.

==== Formal beginning of Jehovah's Witnesses ====
In July 1931, Joseph Rutherford adopted the name "Jehovah's witnesses" for the Bible Student movement group that remained affiliated with the Watch Tower Society.

- 1932: Assertion that God's Holy Spirit ceased operating on his people when "[Jesus] the Lord came to his temple, in 1918", at which point Jesus 'took charge of feeding the flock'.
- 1932: Device on which Jesus was killed, previously shown as a wooden cross, depicted as a stake. An image of the cross appeared on the front page of The Watch Tower until October 1931.
- 1932: Gog and Magog, previously defined as ethnic Jews and European 'false' Christians, redefined as "one of the princes in Satan's organization" (that is, a demon).
- 1932: Identification of "Jonadabs", a "sheep" class of people who take a stand for righteousness and who are to be preserved by God through Armageddon to gain everlasting life on earth. The term was drawn from the account at 2 Kings 10. In 1920 Rutherford had written that it was "unreasonable" to think God was developing any class other than the little flock (the 144,000 to attain heavenly kingship) and the "great company" (second spiritual class also with a heavenly hope). In 1934 the Watchtower explained that the "Jonadabs" survive Armageddon by living in the figurative "City of refuge", represented by remaining affiliated with the Watch Tower Society.
- 1932: The "Jews" to be restored to their homeland, previously defined as literal Jews, redefined as the Christian congregation.
- 1932: Watch Tower Society adherents with an earthly hope should join the worldwide preaching work. In 1927 The Watchtower had directed that only anointed Christians were "entitled" to take part in the ministry.
- 1934: The 1917 teaching that Russell was exercising strong influence from heaven on the "harvesting" of anointed Christians described as "foolish".
- 1934: Vindication of God's name becomes central doctrine. Rutherford noted that God had provided Jesus Christ's sacrifice as the redemption price for sinful humankind, but wrote that this was "secondary to the vindication of Jehovah's name".
- 1935: "Great crowd" of Revelation 7 defined as the "sheep" of Matthew 25, resulting in a redirection of proselytizing efforts from gathering the "elect" (remnant of the 144,000 with a heavenly destiny) to gathering an indeterminate number of people who could survive Armageddon and receive everlasting life on earth. Previously, the "great crowd" was believed to have a heavenly hope.
- 1935: Use of tobacco considered "unclean" and prohibited for Bethel (branch office) staff and traveling overseers.
- 1935: Vaccines, described since 1921 as "devilish" and "an outrage", condemned as a violation of God's law.
- 1936: Birthday celebrations considered objectionable.
- 1937: Jehovah's Witnesses with an earthly hope could be described as "Christian". In 1930 the Watchtower had asserted that the term "Christian" could be applied only to anointed followers of Christ.
- 1938: God's mandate to "be fruitful and multiply" said to apply only after the start of the millennium. The Watchtower said the mandate had never been carried out under righteous conditions, and so had failed to be fulfilled according to God's will. Rutherford urged Witnesses to delay marriage and the bearing of children until after Armageddon.
- 1939: Witnesses required to demonstrate complete neutrality in worldly affairs.

=== 1940–1949 ===
- 1943: Adam's creation, previously 4129 BCE or 4128 BCE, moved forward 100 years to 4028 BCE. The shift in dates also moved the termination point of 6,000 years of human history from October 1872 to 1972.
- 1943: The Watch Tower Bible and Tract Society mentioned as the "legal governing body" associated with God's people.
- 1944: Destruction of Jerusalem moved from 606 BCE to 607 BCE, "principally on account of presumed new archaeological evidence" that moves the return of the Jews from Babylon to Jerusalem from 536 BCE to 537 BCE to maintain 70 years after 607 BCE. Calculations to 1914 are maintained by eliminating the non-existent year zero from 1 BCE to 1 CE.
- 1944: The Watch Tower Society identified as the "governing body" as a theological arrangement similar to the apostles in the first century CE.
- 1944: Adam's creation, previously 4028 BCE, changed to 4026 BCE.
- 1945: Blood transfusions forbidden. Russell had viewed the prohibition on eating blood in Acts 15:19–29 as a 'suggestion' to gentile Christians in order to "guard against stumbling themselves or becoming stumbling blocks to others" and ensure peace within the early church.

=== 1950–1959 ===
- 1950: The term "religion" considered suitable for describing all worship. This reversed Rutherford's pejorative use of "religion" to refer only to 'false worship'.
- 1950: Teaching that the "ancient worthies", including King David, Samson and Jewish prophets, would be resurrected before Armageddon to become "princes" in the new system, abandoned.
- 1951: "This generation" of Matthew 23:36, previously defined as a remnant of the "anointed" on earth during Armageddon changed to "a 'generation' in the ordinary sense" who were alive in 1914.
- 1952: Vaccines, previously condemned, considered acceptable.
- 1952: Toasting and clinking glasses forbidden and regarded as pagan.
- 1953: Adam's creation, previously 4026 BCE, changed to 4025 BCE. End of God's 6,000-year "rest day" ending in northern hemisphere autumn 1976.
- 1953: God's location in the universe cannot be known, replacing the previous view that God's throne is located in the Pleiades star cluster.
- 1953: Gog, previously identified as one of Satan's demon princes, redefined as Satan himself; Magog redefined as "a limited spirit realm near the earth's vicinity."
- 1954: Worship of Jesus, previously considered appropriate and necessary, deemed inappropriate, with the New World Translation translating proskyne′ō as "do obeisance to" rather than "worship" (King James Version). Thereafter, use of "worship" in reference to Jesus considered to be "of a relative kind".
- 1955: Operation of Holy Spirit, asserted in 1932 to have ceased in 1918, stated as having been still operative after 1918.
- 1958: The "seven stars", previously identified as angels, defined as spirit-anointed congregation overseers. Each star represents the office of overseer, occupied by an individual or group, rather than a particular historical individual.
- 1958: Various changes to the interpretation of the 'kings of the north and south' of Daniel 11:17–19 and 11:27–45, previously more closely resembling earlier Adventist interpretations. The 'king of the north' redefined as Antiochus III (verses 17–19); the German Empire (27–30); Adolf Hitler (30–31) and post-World War II Soviet Union (32–45). The 'king of the south' redefined as Ptolemy V (verses 17–19) and Anglo-America (27–45).

=== 1960–1969 ===
- 1961: Acceptance of blood transfusion deemed a disfellowshipping offence. Acceptance of human organ transplant stipulated a personal matter to be decided without criticism.
- 1962: "Superior authorities" of Romans 13:1 redefined as earthly governments, reverting the 1929 change to Russell's 1886 teaching. A year earlier, Russell's view was considered to have made the Watch Tower Bible Students unclean in God's eyes.
- 1963: Adam's creation changed back to 4026 BCE. End of 6,000 years of human history due in northern hemisphere autumn 1975.
- 1967: Human organ transplants equated with cannibalism, "a practice abhorrent to all civilized people", and said to be a procedure not permitted by God. The Watchtower article announcing the view is interpreted by commentators as a prohibition.
- 1968: Interval between Adam's creation and the close of the sixth creative "day", previously "quite some time", changed to "a comparatively short period of time" that "may involve only a difference of weeks or months, not years." The change led to expectations that Christ's 1,000 year reign could begin in 1975.
- 1968: Toasting and clinking glasses discouraged but ultimately declared to be a conscience matter.

=== 1970–1979 ===
- 1970: The "governing body", previously identified as the Watch Tower Society as a legal entity and described as "closely associated with the directors of the Watch Tower Bible and Tract Society of Pennsylvania", redefined as synonymous with the board of directors.
- 1971: Establishment of the "Governing Body of Jehovah's Christian witnesses" on October 1, 1971, now distinct from the Watch Tower Society.
- 1973: Tobacco users not to be accepted for baptism and baptized Witnesses to be disfellowshipped if they continue to smoke after "a reasonable period of time, such as six months".

==== Developmental role of the Governing Body ====
Since 1976, doctrinal changes have been made at closed meetings of the group's Governing Body, whose decisions are described as "God's progressive revelations".

=== 1980–1989 ===
- 1980: Acceptance of human organ transplants stipulated as a matter of personal choice not warranting congregational discipline. View of transplants as cannibalism now said to be held only by "some Christians". The Watchtower article is regarded by commentators as a reversal of Society's 1967 position that the procedure is not permitted by God.
- 1981: Members who formally resign membership of the group (disassociate) are to be shunned in the same manner as disfellowshipped Witnesses.
- 1988: Length of creative 'days' in Genesis, previously defined as exactly 7,000 years each, changed to "at least thousands of years in length" [emphasis added]

=== 1990–1999 ===
- 1990: Interval between Adam's creation and the close of the sixth creative "day" changed to "some time", employing a 1963 reference rather than the 1968 change.
- 1992: The "modern-day Nethinim", previously defined as synonymous with the "other sheep", redefined as a subset of the "other sheep" who serve in positions of authority within the organization as "helpers" to the Governing Body.
- 1993: The 'king of the north' of Daniel 11:44–45, previously identified as the Soviet Union, considered to be uncertain since 1991 following the dissolution of the Soviet Union.
- 1995: Fulfillment of Jesus' parable of the separating of sheep and goats, previously considered to have been ongoing since 1914, changed to after the start of the 'Great Tribulation'.
- 1995: The expression "vindication of Jehovah's name" declared unnecessary, with emphasis on "vindicating his sovereignty" and "sanctifying his name" as being more accurate. The former expression had not appeared in any Watch Tower Society publication since 1991.
- 1995: "This generation" at Matthew 23:36, previously defined as a typical human lifespan since Jesus' parousia in 1914, redefined as a class of people displaying certain characteristics for an indefinite period of time.

=== 2000–2009 ===
- 2007: Selection of the 144,000 "anointed", previously considered to have ended in 1935, changed to an indefinite period.
- 2008: "This generation" redefined as "anointed" believers, who will "not pass away" before the great tribulation begins. This was a return to the belief held in 1927.

=== 2010–2019 ===
- 2010: "This generation" redefined to include "other anointed ones who would see the start of the great tribulation", whose lives "overlap" with "the anointed who were on hand when the sign began to become evident in 1914".
- 2012: "Faithful and discreet slave", previously defined as synonymous with the "anointed" and represented by the Governing Body, redefined to refer to the Governing Body only. The "domestics", previously defined as each member of the "anointed" individually, redefined as including all members of the "anointed" and the "great crowd". The "evil slave" of Matthew 24:48, previously defined as former "anointed" members who reject Jesus, redefined as a hypothetical warning to the "faithful slave".
- 2014: "Gog of Magog", previously identified as Satan, redefined as an unspecified "coalition of nations".
- 2015: The 'arrival of the bridegroom' of Matthew 25:10, previously considered to refer to 1919, changed to a future time of judgment.
- 2015: The 'foolish virgins' of Matthew 25:8–9, previously considered to refer to Bible Students who rejected the Watch Tower Society in 1919, changed to hypothetical unfaithful 'anointed' individuals who would be replaced by other faithful 'anointed' individuals prior to the Great Tribulation.
- 2016: The 'dry bones' in Ezekiel chapter 37, previously understood as persecution of the 'anointed' in 1918 followed by a 'revival' in 1919, reinterpreted as "spiritual captivity" from the second century until 1919.
- 2016: The 'man with the inkhorn' in Ezekiel chapter 9, previously understood as members of the 'anointed' symbolically marking people by preaching, redefined as Jesus judging individuals during the Great Tribulation.
- 2016: The joining of the 'two sticks' in Ezekiel chapter 37, previously associated with reunification of the 'anointed' following a Watch Tower Society leadership dispute, redefined as the 'anointed' being joined by the 'great crowd'.
- 2017: The expression "vindication of Jehovah's name" declared appropriate, reversing a 1995 change.
- 2018: The 'king of the north' of Daniel 11:44–45, previously stated to have been uncertain since 1991, re-identified as "Russia and its allies".
- 2018: The temple vision in Ezekiel, previously likened to the tent in the Epistle to the Hebrews (which Jehovah's Witnesses call a "spiritual temple"), redefined as a more general representation of God's standards for worship.

=== 2020–2029 ===
- 2020: Identification of various historical events from the 2nd to early 19th centuries as relating to the 'kings of the north and south' abandoned. The 'king of the north' of Daniel 11:25–26, previously identified as Aurelian, redefined as the German Empire. The 'king of the south' for the same verses, previously identified as Zenobia, redefined as "Britain".
- 2024: The term used for shunning changed from "disfellowshipping" to "removal from the congregation"; members permitted to briefly greet 'removed' individuals or invite them to religious services, if not considered to be apostates.
- 2025: Toasting and clinking glasses declared be a conscience matter and not inherently pagan.
- 2026: Storage of a person's own blood for medical transfusion back into a patient's own body no longer prohibited.
- 2026: Acceptance of main blood components from other donors and donation of a person's own main blood components for use in medical transfusions no longer prohibited.

== Criticism ==
Former Governing Body member Raymond Franz and Sociology lecturer Andrew Holden have pointed out that doctrines—including those relating to sexual behaviour in marriage and the "superior authorities" of Romans 13:4—have sometimes been altered, only to revert to those held decades earlier. Holden, author of an ethnographic study on Jehovah's Witnesses, commented: "It could be that many Witnesses have not yet been in the organisation long enough to realise that 'new lights' have a habit of growing dimmer, while old ones are switched back on!" In his study of the Witnesses and their history, Tony Wills has suggested that when third president Nathan H. Knorr altered major doctrines established by his predecessor, J. F. Rutherford, he was returning the Witnesses to many of Russell's teachings. He asked: "How can the Society harmonize this circular development with the claimed progressive development?"

In testimony at a 1954 court case in Scotland, senior Watch Tower Society figures admitted that although doctrines were subject to change if they were later regarded as erroneous, all Witnesses were required to accept current teachings or risk expulsion. Under cross-examination, Fred Franz, then vice president of the Watch Tower Society, conceded a Witness could be disfellowshipped and shunned for "causing trouble" over a belief they held that was contrary to Society teaching but subsequently embraced by the group. Society lawyer Hayden G. Covington told the court that although the Society had for decades published a "false prophecy ... a false statement" about the date of Christ's Second Coming, members had been required to accept it and any who had rejected it would have been expelled. He explained: "You must understand we must have unity, we cannot have disunity with a lot of people going every way."

== See also ==
- Eschatology of Jehovah's Witnesses
- Faithful and discreet slave
- Governing Body of Jehovah's Witnesses
- History of Jehovah's Witnesses
- Jehovah's Witnesses beliefs
- Unfulfilled Watch Tower Society predictions

== Bibliography ==
- Barbour, N. H. (1877). Three Worlds, and the Harvest of This World. N. H. Barbour, C. T. Russell.
- Crompton, Robert (1996). Counting the Days to Armageddon. Cambridge: James Clarke & Co. ISBN 0-227-67939-3.
- Franz, Raymond (2002). Crisis of Conscience. Commentary Press, Fourth edition. ISBN 0-914675-23-0.
- Franz, Raymond (2007). In Search of Christian Freedom. Commentary Press. ISBN 978-0-914675-17-4.
- Holden, Andrew (2002). Jehovah's Witnesses: Portrait of a Contemporary Religious Movement. Routledge. ISBN 0-415-26610-6.
- Penton, M. James (1997). Apocalypse Delayed: The Story of Jehovah's Witnesses (2nd ed.). University of Toronto Press. ISBN 0-8020-7973-3.
- Rogerson, Alan (1969). Millions Now Living Will Never Die: A Study of Jehovah's Witnesses. Constable & Co, London. ISBN 978-0-09-455940-0.
- Russell, C. T. (1886). The Divine Plan of the Ages. Watch Tower Bible & Tract Society.
- Russell, C. T. (1889). The Time Is At Hand. Watch Tower Bible & Tract Society.
- Russell, C. T. (1891). Thy Kingdom Come. Watch Tower Bible & Tract Society.
- Russell, C. T. (1897). The Day of Vengeance. Watch Tower Bible & Tract Society.
- Russell, C. T. (1904). The New Creation. Watch Tower Bible & Tract Society.
- Rutherford, J. F. (1930). Light, Book 1. Watch Tower Bible & Tract Society.
- Watch Tower Bible & Tract Society (1993). Jehovah's Witnesses—Proclaimers of God's Kingdom. Watch Tower Bible & Tract Society.
- Wills, Tony (2006). A People For His Name. Lulu Enterprises. ISBN 978-1-4303-0100-4.
