= History of Jehovah's Witnesses =

Jehovah’s Witnesses emerged from the Bible Student movement, a restorationist and Adventist-influenced movement founded by Charles Taze Russell in the 1870s. Early Bible Students adopted beliefs associated with Adventist chronology, including Christ’s invisible presence beginning in 1874 and the expectation that the “Gentile Times” would end in 1914. Russell founded Zion’s Watch Tower in 1879 and incorporated the Watch Tower Bible and Tract Society of Pennsylvania in 1884.

A simplified chart of historical developments of major groups within Bible Students

After Russell’s death in 1916, the movement divided amid disputes over leadership and doctrine. Under Joseph Franklin Rutherford, the Watch Tower Society centralized organizational authority, expanded public preaching, and introduced major doctrinal and structural changes that distinguished his followers from other Bible Student groups. In 1931, Rutherford’s organization adopted the name “Jehovah’s witnesses”, marking a formal separation from the wider Bible Student movement. Substantial organizational changes continued as congregations and teaching programs worldwide came under centralized control. Further changes in its doctrines led to the prohibition of blood transfusions by members, abandonment of the cross in worship, rejection of Christmas and birthday celebrations, and the view of the biblical Armageddon as a global war by God that will destroy the wicked and restore peace on earth. In 1945, the Watch Tower Society, which Russell had founded as a publishing house, amended its charter to state that its purposes included preaching about God's Kingdom, acting as a servant and governing agency of Jehovah's Witnesses, and sending out missionaries and teachers for the public worship of God and Jesus.

The denomination was banned in Canada in World War I, and in Germany, the Soviet Union, Canada, and Australia during World War II. Members suffered widespread persecution and mob violence in some of those countries and in the United States. The group initiated dozens of high-profile legal actions in the United States and Canada between 1938 and 1955 to establish the right of members to sell literature from door to door, abstain from flag salute ceremonies, and gain legal recognition as wartime conscientious objectors. Members of the denomination suffered persecution in some African countries in the 1960s and 1970s. Since 2004 the group has suffered a series of official bans in Russia.

== Background ==
Timeline—1870–1916
1877	Russell and Barbour published Three Worlds
1879	Russell begins publishing Watch Tower
1881	Watch Tower Bible and Tract Society is founded
1909	First schism Letters of protest
1914	Photo-Drama of Creation released
1916	Russell dies

In about 1869, Charles Taze Russell encountered Adventist preaching associated with Jonas Wendell, which renewed his interest in biblical prophecy and apocalyptic chronology. Influenced by Adventist and restorationist ideas, Russell rejected doctrines such as hellfire and the immortal soul, and came to believe that Christ’s return would be invisible rather than physical. In 1876 he came into contact with Adventist publisher Nelson H. Barbour, whose chronology identified 1874 as the beginning of Christ’s invisible presence and 1914 as the end of the “Gentile Times”.

After separating from Barbour in 1879 over doctrinal disagreements, Russell began publishing Zion's Watch Tower and Herald of Christ's Presence, later known as The Watchtower. In 1881, Zion’s Watch Tower Tract Society was formed to distribute literature, and in 1884 the organization was legally incorporated with Russell as president.

Russell’s followers became known as Bible Students. Their congregations operated largely autonomously, while Russell’s writings, especially Studies in the Scriptures, formed the movement’s primary doctrinal basis. By Russell’s death in 1916, the movement had expanded internationally and developed a distinct prophetic framework centered on biblical chronology and expectations surrounding 1914.

== 1917-1942 ==
=== Transition from Bible Student movement ===
Timeline—1916–1942
1917	Rutherford elected president of Watch Tower
1917	Second schism Control of the headquarters
1919	Publication of theGolden Age begins
1920	Rutherford publishes Millions Now Living Never Die, setting 1925 as the date for return of Old Testament "Princes"
1929	Rutherford builds Beth Sarim to hold resurrected Bible personages
1931	Third schism The name changes to "Jehovah's witnesses"
1942	Rutherford dies

Following the death of Charles Taze Russell in 1916, Joseph Franklin Rutherford was elected president of the Watch Tower Society in 1917. His leadership was immediately contested by several directors and prominent Bible Students, resulting in organizational disputes and schisms that divided the movement. A number of independent Bible Student groups emerged during this period, while Rutherford consolidated control of the Society and increasingly centralized authority at the Brooklyn headquarters.

The movement also faced government opposition during this period. Watch Tower leaders were imprisoned in the United States in 1918 under the Espionage Act before their convictions were overturned on appeal. On his release from prison, Rutherford began a major reorganization of Bible Student activities. The Watch Tower Society set up its own printing establishment and in 1919 Rutherford founded the magazine The Golden Age (now Awake!), which the Bible Students began distributing in response to an increasing emphasis by the Brooklyn headquarters on door-to-door preaching. Brooklyn appointed a "director" in each congregation in 1919, and a year later directed all congregation members who participated in the preaching work to report weekly on their witnessing activity.

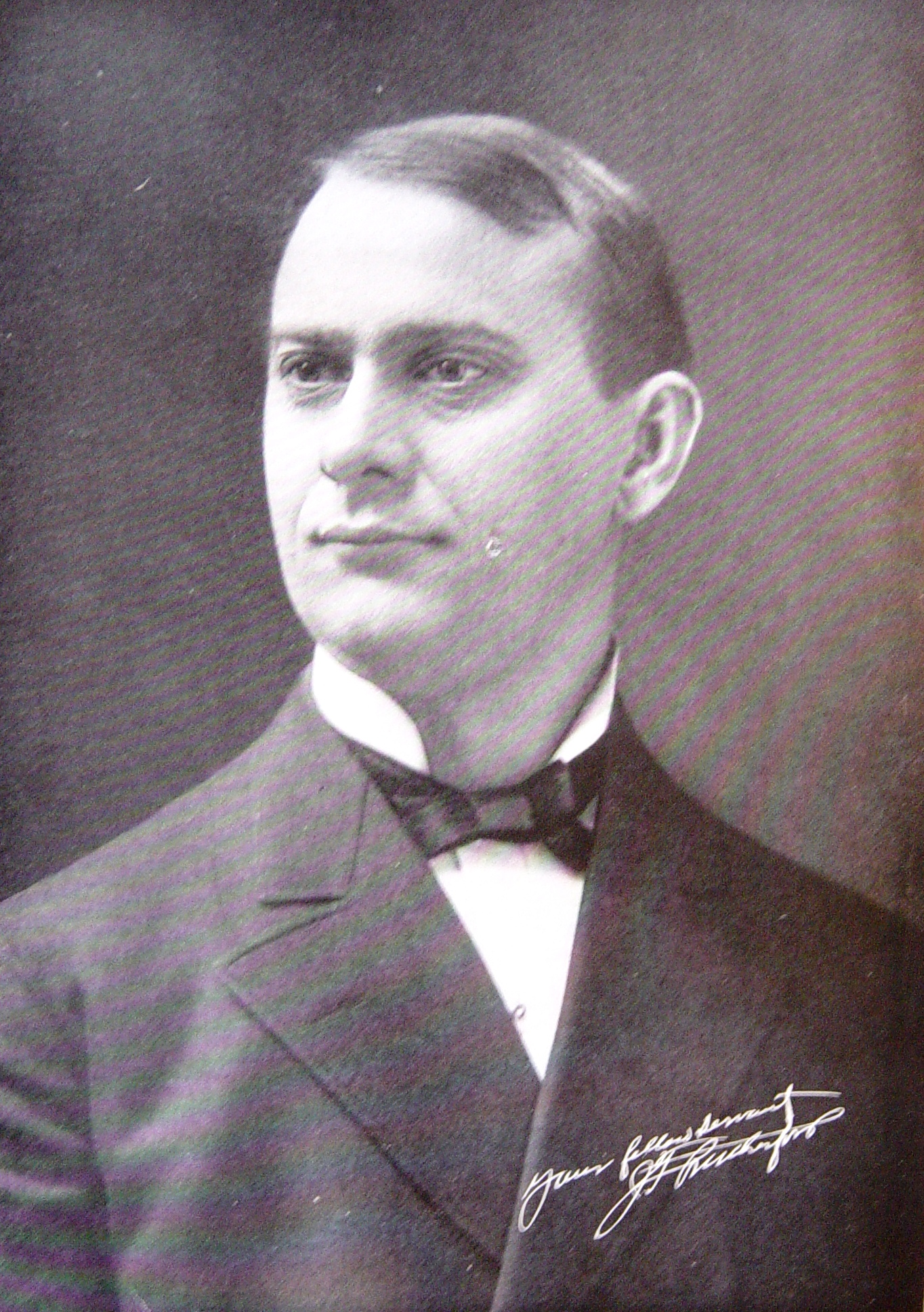
Joseph Franklin Rutherford (1869–1942)

Major annual conventions were organized from 1922 and 1928. At an eight-day assembly at Cedar Point, Ohio in 1922 Rutherford launched a series of international conventions under the theme "Advertise the King and Kingdom", attracting crowds of up to 20,000, The movement’s structure, methods, and teachings changed substantially. Greater emphasis was placed on organized preaching, literature distribution, large conventions, and centralized direction from headquarters. Door-to-door evangelism became increasingly prominent, supplemented by radio broadcasts, sound cars, and portable phonographs featuring Rutherford’s recorded sermons. Congregational autonomy was gradually reduced as the Society adopted increasingly centralized and “theocratic” forms of organization. Bible Students faced bans, arrests, and mob violence in several countries because of their preaching activity and refusal to participate in patriotic ceremonies.

Rutherford's presidency was marked by extensive doctrinal revision, with many teachings associated with Russell altered or abandoned and many new teachings introduced. The Finished Mystery continued expectations that dramatic end-time events were imminent, declaring that God would destroy churches "wholesale" and church members by the millions in 1918, and that all earthly governments would be destroyed in 1920, resulting in anarchy. Expectations also remained strong that the change of the "saints" and completion of the "body of Christ" in heaven was imminent. A Watch Tower report on the 1918 Brooklyn convention said there was good reason to believe the gathering "might be the last in this vicinity, before the great convention beyond the veil".

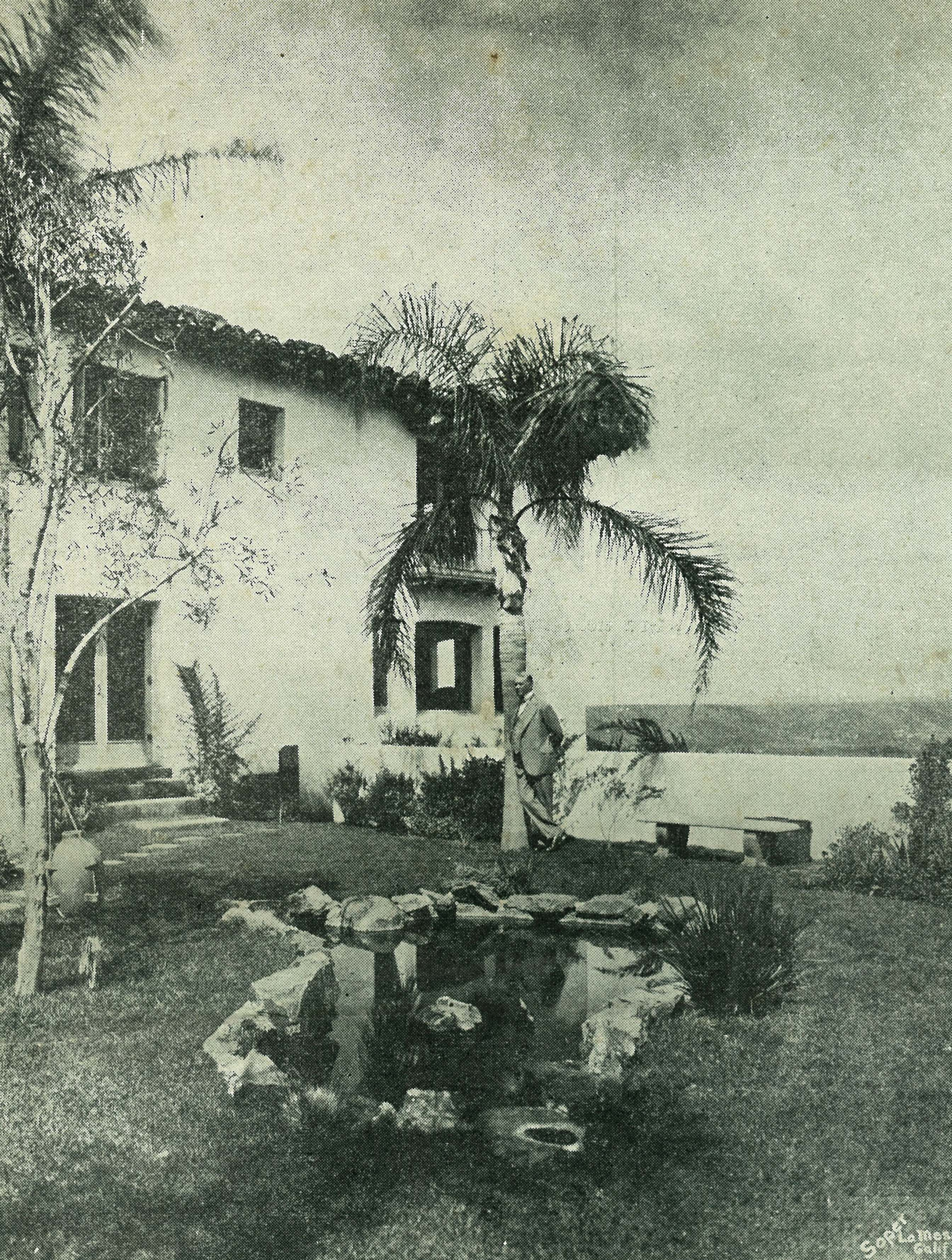
J.F. Rutherford at the Beth Sarim mansion, San Diego, 1931

Disregarding Russell's rejection of 1925 as a year of prophetic importance, Rutherford delivered the lecture “Millions Now Living Will Never Die” in 1920, announcing that Christ's thousand-year reign would begin in 1925, bringing the restoration of an earthly paradise and the resurrection to earth of biblical “ancient worthies” such as Abraham and Isaac. Jerusalem was expected to become the world capital, and the resurrected “princes” would communicate with humanity by radio. The predictions prompted some Bible Students to abandon businesses and sell homes in anticipation of the expected events, while Bible Student farmers in Canada and the United States refused to plant spring crops in 1925 and mocked members who did. In 1930, Rutherford had Beth Sarim constructed in San Diego, California, to house the resurrected “princes” expected before Armageddon.

The failure of the 1925 expectations contributed to further defections from the movement. Memorial attendance fell sharply between 1925 and 1928, reflecting both internal divisions and the continuing departure of many long-term Bible Students. At the same time, Rutherford continued reshaping the movement’s theology and identity. Teachings concerning “character development”, the restoration of natural Israel, and Russell’s role as the movement’s unique prophetic figure were abandoned or reinterpreted. Increasing emphasis was placed on the name “Jehovah”, the vindication of God’s sovereignty, and the organization’s role as God’s exclusive channel.

The new preaching methods introduced by Rutherford brought an influx of members through the early 1920s, but attendance at the Bible Students' yearly Memorial fell sharply again, dropping from 90,434 in 1925 to 17,380 in 1928. Rutherford dismissed their defection as the Lord "shaking out" the unfaithful. Author Tony Wills, who analyzed attendance and "field worker" statistics, suggests it was the "more dedicated" Bible Students who quit through the 1920s, to be replaced by newcomers in larger numbers, creating what author Robert Crompton described as one of the most significant of the movement's breaks with its early history.

Armageddon was redefined in 1925 as a battle between God and Satan, resulting in the overthrow of human governments and false religion. A 1926 Watchtower article introduced a new emphasis on the importance of the name "Jehovah". From 1926 publications began discrediting earlier teachings on the importance of Christian "character development" or personal "sanctification". In 1927 they discarded the teaching that Russell had been the "faithful and wise servant" of Matthew 24:45–47. By then the Watch Tower Society had rejected the belief that Russell alone had been the sole channel of scriptural enlightenment. In 1927 the Society disposed of remaining copies of Russell's Studies in the Scriptures and The Finished Mystery and ceased printing the books. In 1928 Russell's teaching that the natural Jews would be restored to Palestine and hold a prominent place in the earthly part of God's kingdom was dropped. Christmas celebrations ceased in 1928 after a radio broadcast and Golden Age articles on their pagan origins.

Bible Students were urged to extend their door-to-door preaching to include Sundays. The move quickly attracted opposition from the clergy. In 1928 Bible Students began to be arrested in the U.S. for breaching local by-laws on Sabbath observance. Rutherford challenged the laws in courts, ultimately fighting hundreds of cases in New Jersey alone as he insisted the preachers were not selling literature, but distributing it for a contribution to Society funds. In 1929, Rutherford announced that the vindication of God's name—which would ultimately occur when millions of unbelievers were destroyed at Armageddon—was the primary doctrine of Christianity and more important than God's display of goodness or grace towards humans.

=== Formal adoption of new name ===
At a convention in Columbus, Ohio on July 26, 1931, Rutherford made a psychological break from the large number of disaffected Bible Students by proposing the adoption of the name "Jehovah's witnesses", based on the scripture at Isaiah 43:10, "Ye are my witnesses, saith the Lord". The Watch Tower said the new, distinctive name was designed to exalt God's name and end public confusion caused by the proliferation of groups carrying the name "Bible Students". It explained: "It will be a name that could not be used by another, and such as none other will want to use." In 1932, he eliminated the system of congregations electing bodies of elders, claiming the office of elder was unscriptural; in 1938, he replaced the earlier system of congregational self-government with a "theocratic" or "God-ruled" organizational system in which the Brooklyn headquarters would make all appointments in congregations worldwide. Consolation magazine explained: "The Theocracy is at present administered by the Watch Tower Bible and Tract Society, of which Judge Rutherford is the president and general manager." Rutherford, who had shown an earlier interest in politics, applied terms to the organization that were more common in politics and business: "organization" replaced "congregation" when referring to the worldwide community of believers, while "companies" denoted individual congregations. He pushed for more "field service" and "campaigns" of kingdom "advertising" in "territories", with "publishers" working under the direction of a field service "captain".

By 1933, the timing of Christ's parousia and the start of the "last days" had been moved from 1874 to 1914 with the principles of parallel dispensations retained to place Christ's enthronement 3½ years later in 1918. In 1935 a new interpretation of the "great company" of Revelation 7 placed them on earth as survivors of Armageddon rather than in heaven and from that point converts to the movement were generally identified as those who, if worthy, would qualify for life on a paradise earth. In 1935, Witnesses were told they should refuse to salute the flag, stand for the national anthem, or accept alternative service provided for those who had conscientious objection to military service. Reference to the cross and crucifixion in Watch Tower publications ceased in 1936 when it was asserted that Christ had actually died on a tree. By 1939 Watch Tower publications explained that only those who were part of God's "organization" would be spared at Armageddon.

Under Rutherford's presidency, membership grew from about 44,000 in 1928 to about 115,000 at the time of his death on January 8, 1942.

=== Persecution and opposition ===
In 1935, Witnesses were told they should refuse to salute national flags, stand for national anthems, or accept alternative service provided for those who had conscientious objection to military service. In late 1936 U.S. schools began expelling Witness children who refused to salute the flag. When the U.S. Supreme Court affirmed the right of schools to expel non-conforming children in June 1940, many states began passing laws requiring compulsory flag salute and similarly expelling children. The Supreme Court decision prompted a wave of violence against U.S. Witnesses, mostly in small towns and rural areas, where they were beaten, castrated, tarred and feathered, and in some cases killed.

More than 2,500 cases were reported from 1940 to 1944. Hundreds of Witnesses were arrested and charged with crimes including sedition. The Witnesses responded with campaigns of mass witnessing, descending on hostile towns in their hundreds, and organizing "information marches", some 10 kilometres (6.2 mi) long, in which members wore sandwich boards and held placards and banners.

In Germany, preaching activity was banned and the Watch Tower Society headquarters was seized and closed. Thousands of Witnesses were arrested on peddling charges from 1922. In 1933, following the rise to power of Adolf Hitler, government restrictions were tightened, prompting the public distribution of more than two million copies of a Declaration of Facts in which the Witnesses protested at their treatment and requested the right to preach. It had little effect: Witnesses were fired from their jobs and about 2,000 were imprisoned in concentration camps. Jehovah's Witnesses were the first Christian denomination to be banned and the most extensively persecuted Christian group during the Nazi era.

Witnesses in Japan were imprisoned and tortured. Members in the U.S., Canada, Australia, and Britain were imprisoned as conscientious objectors. The Witnesses were banned in Germany in 1936, Canada in July 1940, and Australia in January 1941. Under Rutherford's leadership, a legal staff was developed to establish their right to preach and their right to refrain from nationalistic ceremonies. Between 1938 and 1955 the Watch Tower Society won 36 out of 45 religion-related court cases. These legal battles resulted in significant expansions in freedom of speech and religion in both countries.

Writers including American essayist Barbara Grizzuti Harrison, William Whalen, Alan Rogerson, and William Schnell have claimed the group was complicit in its own victimisation in the United States, often goading authorities with cartoons and books that ridiculed and denigrated church and state and provocative mass assemblies in which the Witnesses flooded towns with preachers. They claim a deliberate course of martyrdom served to attract society's dispossessed and oppressed members and also provided apparent validation of the "truth" of the Watchtower cause as evidenced by the level of opposition from the outside world as they struggled to serve God.

== 1942–1975 ==
Timeline—1942–1975
1942	Knorr elected president of Watch Tower Society
1950	New World Translation of the Holy Scriptures started (completed 1961)
1966	The year 1975 suggested as possible date for Armageddon

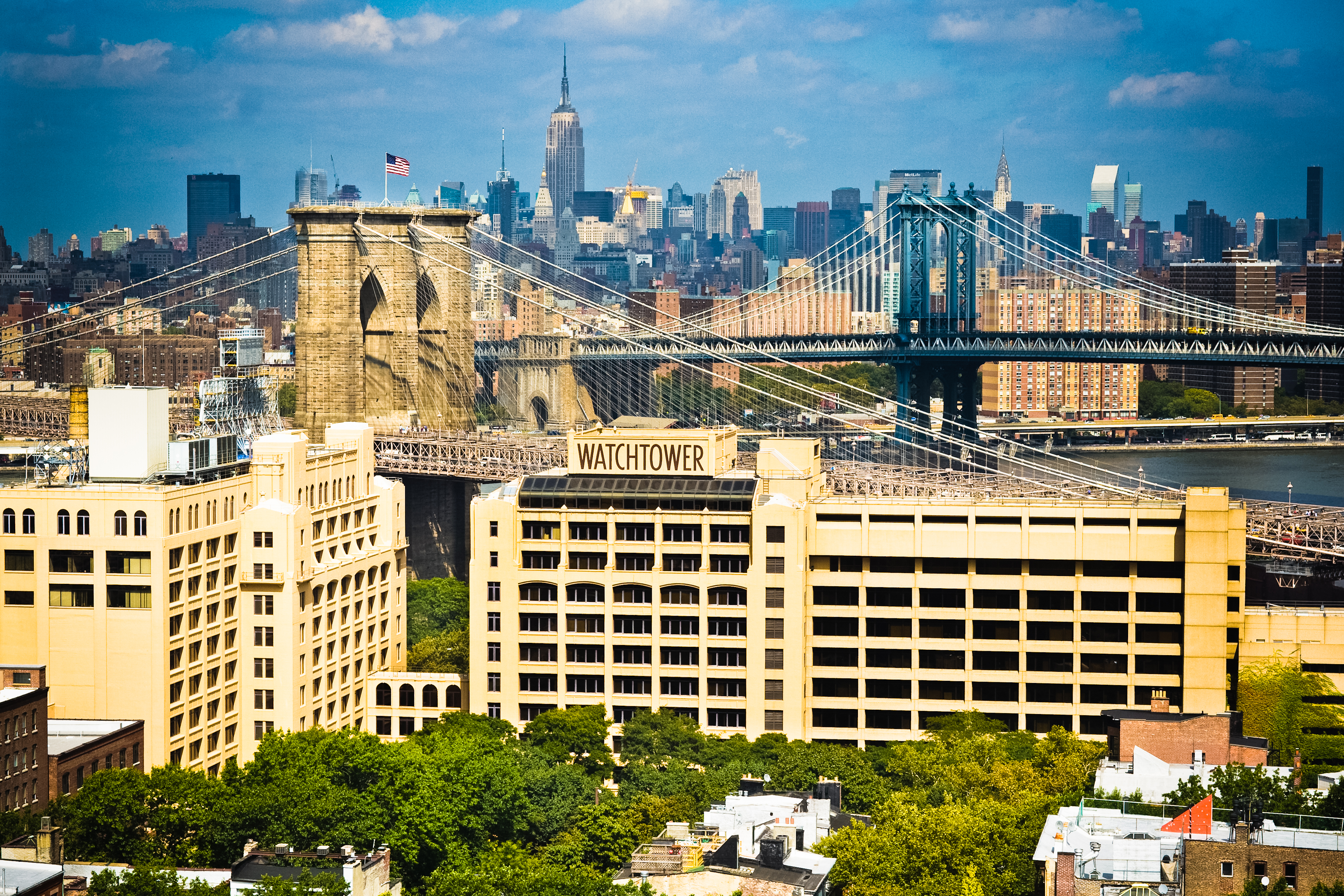
The New York headquarters of the Watch Tower Bible and Tract Society

Rutherford was succeeded by Nathan Homer Knorr. Knorr's tenure as president was notable for the transfer from individual to corporate leadership. None of the Society's publications after 1942 acknowledged authorship and were instead attributed to an anonymous Writing Committee. From about 1944, the term "governing body" began to be used with a measure of frequency, with the term initially applied to the Watch Tower Society's seven-man Board of Directors.

Knorr began a campaign of real estate acquisition in Brooklyn to expand the organisation's world headquarters, expanded printing production throughout the world, and organized a series of international assemblies that dwarfed those of Rutherford in the 1920s. In 1958, more than 253,000 Witnesses gathered at two New York City venues, Yankee Stadium and the Polo Grounds, for an eight-day convention where more than 7,000 were baptized. Other large conventions were held in the U.S., Canada, and Germany.

He instituted major training programs, including the Watchtower Bible School of Gilead to train missionaries, and the Theocratic Ministry School to give instruction in preaching and public speaking at the congregational level. He commissioned a new translation of the Bible, which was released progressively from 1950. It was published as the complete New World Translation of the Holy Scriptures in 1961. Also produced were a Greek-English New Testament interlinear, The Kingdom Interlinear Translation of the Greek Scriptures, and a Bible encyclopedia, Aid to Bible Understanding. The offices of elder and ministerial servant (deacon) were restored to Witness congregations in 1972, with appointments being made from headquarters.

Knorr's vice-president, Frederick William Franz, became the leading theologian for the group and the pace of doctrinal change slowed. Blood transfusions were prohibited for Witnesses from 1945. In 1961 the eating of blood in meat was prohibited. The Watchtower instructed Witnesses to check with their butcher whether the animals and fowl he sold had been properly drained of their blood. Birthday celebrations were described as "objectionable" in 1951 because of their pagan origins, and other explicit rules regarding acceptable conduct among members were introduced, with a greater emphasis placed on disfellowshipping as a disciplinary measure.

Adult male Witnesses in the US, Britain, and some European countries were jailed for refusal of military service in the post-war years, with particularly harsh treatment meted out in Portugal, Spain, Italy, Greece, East Germany, and Romania. Wide-scale persecution of Witnesses in several African nations was launched between 1967 and 1975, with as many as 21,000 fleeing Malawi to refugee camps in Zambia after a series of murders and beatings in 1972. 7,000 Mozambiquean members of the denomination were arrested in 1975 to be sent to communist re-education camps.

During Knorr's presidency, membership of Jehovah's Witnesses grew from 108,000 to more than two million.

=== Predictions for 1975 ===
From 1966, Witness publications heightened anticipation of Christ's thousand-year millennial reign beginning in late 1975. Repeating the 1925 cycle of excitement, anticipation, and then disappointment, Witness publications and convention talks intensified focus on 1975 as the "appropriate" time for God to act, with statements that "the immediate future is certain to be filled with climactic events ... within a few years at most the final parts of the Bible prophecy relative to these 'last days' will undergo fulfillment". The September 15, 1971 issue of The Watchtower warned that "all worldly careers are soon to come to an end", and advised youths that they should not "get interested in ‘higher education’ for a future that will never eventuate."

A chart in a 1971 Awake! indicated the "thrilling hope" of a "grand Sabbath of rest and relief" in the mid-1970s at the close of 6000 years of human history. Some Witnesses sold businesses and homes, gave up jobs, deferred medical procedures, and set aside plans to start a family in anticipation of Armageddon's arrival. The May 1974 issue of the Watch Tower Society's newsletter, Our Kingdom Ministry, commended Witnesses who had sold homes and property to devote themselves to preaching in the "short time" remaining.

Watch Tower literature did not state dogmatically that 1975 would definitely mark the end, and the buildup was tempered with cautions that there was no certainty that Armageddon would arrive in 1975, but magazines warned that "time is running out rapidly" and that "only a few years, at most" remained before Armageddon. Circuit assemblies in 1970 held a public talk entitled "Who will conquer the world in the 1970s?". In a speech in Australia in 1975, the society's vice-president Frederick Franz went so far as to name a precise date—September 5, 1975—as the "end of the present wicked system".

Witnesses were urged that they should not be "toying with the words of Jesus that 'concerning that day and hour nobody knows' ... to the contrary, one should be keenly aware that the end of this system of things is rapidly coming to its violent end." The number of baptisms soared from about 59,000 in 1966, to more than 297,000 in 1974. Membership declined after expectations for 1975 failed. In 1976 The Watchtower advised those who had been "disappointed" by the failure of the predictions for 1975 to adjust their viewpoint because their understanding had been "based on wrong premises". In 1980, after several proposals by Governing Body members to apologize to Witnesses were voted down, the Watch Tower Society admitted its responsibility in building up hope regarding 1975.

== 1976–present ==
Timeline—1976–2026
1976	Governing Body takes control
1980	Purge of senior Brooklyn headquarters staff
1995	Teaching that the generation of 1914 would see Armageddon is abandoned
2008	Definition of generation changed to 'remnant of anointed'
2010	Definition of generation changed to 'living anointed whose lives overlap 1914 anointed'

=== Organizational developments ===
The leadership structure of Jehovah's Witnesses was reorganized from January 1, 1976, with the power of the presidency passed to the Governing Body of Jehovah's Witnesses and the establishment of six committees to oversee tasks such as writing, teaching, publishing, and evangelizing work. At this time, Watch Tower Society publications began using the capitalized name, Jehovah's Witnesses. Following Knorr's death in 1977, Frederick William Franz became president of the Watch Tower Society of Pennsylvania.

A purge of senior Brooklyn headquarters staff was carried out in April and May 1980 after it was discovered some at the highest ranks of the hierarchy dissented with core Watch Tower Society doctrines, particularly surrounding the significance of 1914, and wished to propose adjustments as "new understandings" to continue the century-long tradition of changes in doctrines. Unease at the chronology doctrines had surfaced within the Governing Body earlier in 1980. In February, three Governing Body members – aware that those who had been alive in 1914 were rapidly dwindling in number, despite the teaching that their generation would be alive to see Armageddon—had proposed a radical change in Watch Tower doctrines to require that the "generation" that would see the arrival of Armageddon had been alive only since 1957, the year of the launch of the Soviet space satellite Sputnik. The proposal, which would have extended the deadline for Armageddon by 43 years, failed to gain a majority vote.

Internal dissatisfaction with official doctrines continued to grow, leading to a series of secret investigations and judicial hearings. Among those expelled from the Witnesses was former Governing Body member Raymond Franz. Many of those expelled were labeled by Governing Body members as "spiritual fornicators", "mentally diseased" and "insane". The purge resulted in a number of schisms in the movement in Canada, Britain, and northern Europe, and prompted the formation of loose groups of disaffected former Witnesses. The Watch Tower Society responded to the crisis with a new, hardened attitude towards the treatment of defectors and expelled Witnesses.

In 1992, Milton George Henschel, then a member of the Governing Body, succeeded Franz as president of the Watch Tower Society of Pennsylvania. In 2000, members of the Governing Body resigned from positions on the boards of the Watch Tower Society and its subsidiary corporations in order to focus on doctrinal matters. Don Alden Adams then replaced Henschel as president. Following Adams' death in 2014, Robert Ciranko became president of the Watch Tower Society.

Beginning in 2004, various Watch Tower Society properties in Brooklyn were sold in preparation for the establishment of a new world headquarters in Warwick, New York, completed in 2016.

=== Doctrinal changes ===
In 1995, changes regarding their understanding of Jesus' comments regarding "this generation" (from Matthew 24:34) were published. Throughout the previous four decades, Jehovah's Witnesses had taught that the generation that saw the events of 1914 would not die out before Armageddon came. The understanding of the "generation" was again adjusted in 2008, to refer to the remnant of the anointed. In 2010, the definition of the generation was changed again, wherein the lives of anointed individuals living in 1914 overlap with a second group alive in the present day, some of whom will see Armageddon. Jehovah's Witnesses continue to teach that Armageddon is imminent.

History of Eschatological Doctrine
	Last Days begin	Start of Christ's Presence	Christ made King	Resurrection of 144,000	Judgment of Religion	Separating Sheep & Goats	Great Tribulation
1879–1920	1799	1874	1878			during Millennium	1914, 1915, 1918, 1920
1920–1923	1799	1874	1914	1878	1878	during Millennium	1925
1923–1925	1799	1874	1914	1878	1878	during Christ's presence	1925
1925–1927	1799	1874	1914	1878	1878	during Christ's presence	within generation of 1914
1927–1929	1799	1874	1914	1918	1878	during Christ's presence	within generation of 1914
1929–1930	1914	1874	1914	1918	1878	during Christ's presence	within generation of 1914
1930–1966	1914			1918	1919	during Christ's presence	within generation of 1914
1966–1975	1914			1918	1919	during Christ's presence	1975?
1975–1995	1914			1918	1919	during Christ's presence	within generation of 1914
1995–present	1914			1918	1919	during Great Tribulation	imminent

== See also ==
- Eschatology of Jehovah's Witnesses
- Jehovah's Witnesses and blood transfusions
- Unfulfilled Watch Tower Society predictions
- Repressions against Jehovah's Witnesses in Poland between 1945 and 1956
