= Don Alden Adams =

American Jehovah's Witness (1925–2019)

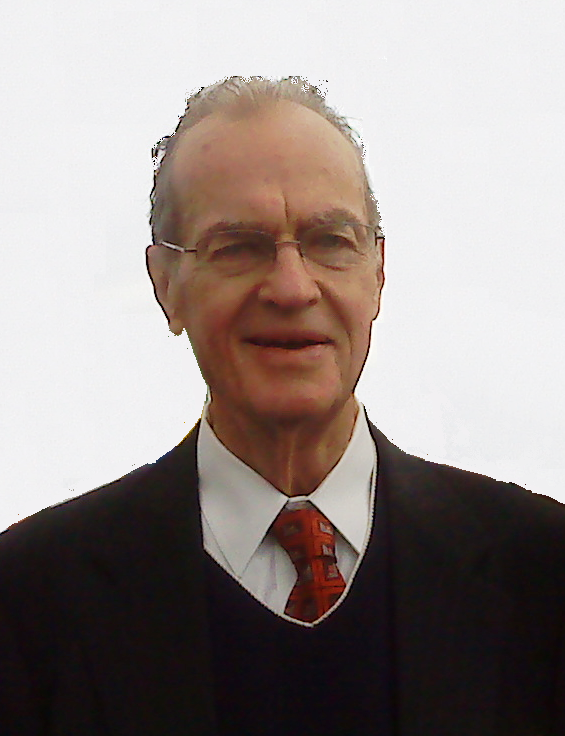
- Adams in 2009
- Born: January 16, 1925; Oak Park, Illinois, U.S.
- Died: December 30, 2019 (aged 94)
- Occupation: President of the Watch Tower Bible and Tract Society of Pennsylvania (2000–2014)
- Movement: Jehovah's Witnesses
- Spouse: Dolores Adams

Don Alden Adams (January 16, 1925 – December 30, 2019) was president of the Watch Tower Bible and Tract Society of Pennsylvania (2000–2014), the principal corporation of Jehovah's Witnesses.

== Biography ==
Born in January 16, 1925 in Oak Park, Illinois, Adams grew up in a big family, which originally had connections to the Episcopal church. His mother showed interest in Jehovah's Witnesses and gradually the children also became interested. His father initially showed no interest, but involved himself in a legal case when one of Don's younger brothers was not exempted from military service, and eventually became a member.

After serving as a full-time preacher, Adams was invited in late 1944 to serve at the world headquarters of Jehovah's Witnesses in Brooklyn, New York, where he was secretary to Society president, Nathan H. Knorr. By the 1960s, Adams served directly under the Governing Body as a zone overseer, visiting various countries to audit branch offices and meet with Witness missionaries. Later, Adams directed world missionary activities, and served on the "Bethel Home Committee".

In 2000, the New York Daily News described Adams as "a longtime insider ... at the world headquarters in Brooklyn Heights." The Washington Post described Adams as "a 50-year veteran of the organization," which has been restated in subsequent publications. Adams also served on the Publishing Committee.

== Watch Tower Society presidency ==
Adams, a Governing Body "helper", became president of the Watch Tower Society after Governing Body member Milton G. Henschel stepped down from the position in 2000. In that year, members of the Governing Body resigned from their executive positions of the corporations of Jehovah's Witnesses, although the periodical Christianity Today reported that the Governing Body of Jehovah's Witnesses would continue its "oversight" role.

Adams was the first president of the Watch Tower Society who was not also a member of the Governing Body. In 2000, the Governing Body was formally separated from the Board of Directors. Adams' presidency was administrative, and he is not considered to have impacted the organization's ministry as have past Watch Tower Society presidents. Adams' brother, Joel Adams, was a vice-president of the Christian Congregation of Jehovah's Witnesses, Inc., a related corporation.

In 2014, Adams was replaced as president of the Watch Tower Society by Robert Ciranko. Adams died in December 2019, at the age of 94.

Preceded by Milton G. Henschel	President of Watch Tower Bible and Tract Society of Pennsylvania; October 7, 2000 – 2014	Succeeded by Robert Ciranko
