= Milton George Henschel =

American Jehovah's Witness (1920–2003)

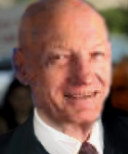
- Born: August 9, 1920; Pomona, New Jersey, U.S.
- Died: 22 March 2003 (aged 82); Brooklyn, New York, U.S.
- Occupation: President of the Watch Tower Bible and Tract Society of Pennsylvania
- Movement: Jehovah's Witnesses
- Spouse: Lucille Bennett (m. 1956)

Milton George Henschel (August 9, 1920 – March 22, 2003) was a member of the Governing Body of Jehovah's Witnesses from 1971 until his death in 2003. He succeeded Frederick W. Franz as president of the Watch Tower Society, serving from 1992 until 2000.

== Personal life ==
Milton Henschel was born in Pomona, New Jersey. His father, Herman George Henschel assisted in the establishment of the Watch Tower Society's farm on Staten Island, working with and mentoring the staff about once each week during the 1920s. The family relocated to Brooklyn, New York, in 1934 to enable Herman to work on construction projects in the printeries and residences for Jehovah's Witnesses' headquarters there.

Milton was baptized as a Jehovah's Witness minister in 1934, and joined the full-time Watch Tower staff in 1939. His older brother, Warren, was a full-time minister assigned to Oregon until he was invited to serve at the Brooklyn facility around 1940. In 1956, Henschel married Lucille Bennett, a graduate of the 14th class of the Watchtower Bible School of Gilead and a former missionary in Venezuela. Henschel died on March 22, 2003, at age 82, survived by his wife Lucille and brother Warren.

== Professional life ==
In 1939, Henschel was appointed secretary to Nathan H. Knorr, who was overseeing work at the Watch Tower printery. After Knorr became president of the Watch Tower Society in 1942, Henschel continued as his assistant. Henschel was often with Knorr in his travels, visiting at least 150 countries during this time. By 1945, Henschel was a featured speaker at international events though only 25 years old.

By 1947, Henschel had claimed to be "anointed"—not unusual among Jehovah's Witnesses at the time—which was a criterion at the time for appointment as a director of the Watch Tower Society. Henschel was elected to the board of directors in 1947, after the death of W. E. Van Amburgh (since 1903 Secretary-Treasurer of the Watch Tower Bible and Tract Society), who died on February 7 of that year.

By 1960, Henschel was a zone overseer, supervising and auditing the administrative and ministry activities of about 10% of the Watch Tower Society's branch offices.

In March 1963, Henschel was among a large group of Jehovah's Witnesses who were detained and assaulted during a religious conference in Liberia. He returned a few months later to meet with Liberia's president to discuss freedom of worship for Jehovah's Witnesses. In June, 1963, Henschel was a guest on a talk show hosted by Larry King.

In a July 1968 interview with the Detroit Free Press, Henschel was asked about the Watch Tower Society's recently stated opposition to organ transplants, to which he responded that "transplanting organs is really cannibalism", a position that was abandoned in 1980. In the same interview, Henschel described the Watch Tower view of the immediate future, making reference to the impending battle of Armageddon. He conceded that there was no specific date for the outbreak of Armageddon, but stated, "1975 is a year to watch," alluding to Jehovah's Witnesses' belief that 6000 years of mankind's existence would be reached that year, an apparent precursor to Christ's millennial reign.

By 1973, Henschel was "branch overseer for the United States". Henschel contributed to the book Religions of America (1975), edited by Leo Rosten, with the chapter "Who are Jehovah's Witnesses?". In 1984, Henschel was the chairman for the centennial commemoration of the incorporation of the Watch Tower Society.

In February 1990, Henschel met with the chairman of the Committee of Religious Affairs in Moscow, along with eleven Russian elders representing local Jehovah's Witnesses, which led to the official recognition of Jehovah's Witnesses in Russia by March 1991.

Henschel became president of the Watch Tower Society December 30, 1992, and remained in that position until 2000. Major organizational changes took place in 2000, as the Governing Body of Jehovah's Witnesses was separated from the Society's board of directors. As a result, members of the Governing Body stepped aside from their capacities in the Watch Tower Society, and Don A. Adams was appointed president. Henschel remained a member of the Governing Body until his death in 2003.

== Sources ==
- Chryssides, George D. (2019). Historical Dictionary of Jehovah's Witnesses. Historical Dictionaries of Religions, Philosophies, and Movements Series (2 ed.). Rowman & Littlefield Publishing Group. ISBN 9781538119525.
- Rhodes, Ron (2005). "Chapter 2. Jehovah's Witnesses § Milton Henschel (1920 – 2003)". In Enroth, Ronald M. (ed.). A Guide to New Religious Movements. InterVarsity Press. pp. 30–31. ISBN 9780830823819.

Preceded by Frederick W. Franz	President of Watch Tower Bible and Tract Society of Pennsylvania; December 30, 1992 – October 7, 2000	Succeeded by Don A. Adams
