= Watch Tower Bible and Tract Society of Pennsylvania =

Non-profit organization of Jehovah's Witnesses

- Logo
- Formation: February 16, 1881; 145 years ago; (incorporated December 15, 1884; 141 years ago)
- Founder: Charles Taze Russell
- Founded at: Pittsburgh, Pennsylvania, U.S.
- Tax ID no.: 11-1857820
- Legal status: 501(c)(3) church
- Headquarters: Warwick, New York, U.S.
- President: Robert Ciranko
- Subsidiaries: Various
- Website: jw.org
- Formerly called: Zion's Watch Tower Tract Society (1881–1896); Watch Tower Bible and Tract Society (1896–1955)

The Watch Tower Bible and Tract Society of Pennsylvania is a non-stock, not-for-profit organization headquartered in Warwick, New York. It is the main legal entity used worldwide by Jehovah's Witnesses to direct, administer, and disseminate doctrines for the group. It is the parent organization of a number of Watch Tower subsidiaries, including the Watchtower Society of New York and the International Bible Students Association. The number of voting shareholders of the corporation is limited to between 300 and 500 "mature, active and faithful" male Jehovah's Witnesses. About 5,800 Jehovah's Witnesses provide voluntary unpaid labor, as members of a religious order, in three large Watch Tower Society facilities in New York. Nearly 15,000 other members of the order work at the Watch Tower Society's other facilities worldwide.

The organization was formed in 1881 as Zion's Watch Tower Tract Society for the purpose of distributing religious tracts. The society was incorporated in Pittsburgh, Pennsylvania, on December 15, 1884. In 1896, the society was renamed Watch Tower Bible and Tract Society. Following a leadership dispute in the Bible Student movement, the society remained associated with the branch of the movement that became known as Jehovah's Witnesses. In 1955, the corporation was renamed Watch Tower Bible and Tract Society of Pennsylvania. In 1976, all activities of the Watch Tower Society were brought under the supervision of the Governing Body of Jehovah's Witnesses.

== History ==
On February 16, 1881, Zion's Watch Tower Tract Society was formed in Pittsburgh, Pennsylvania, United States, for the purpose of organizing the printing and distribution of religious tracts. William Henry Conley, a Pittsburgh industrialist and philanthropist, served as president, with Charles Taze Russell serving as secretary-treasurer. The society's primary journal was Zion's Watch Tower and Herald of Christ's Presence, first published in 1879 by Russell, founder of the Bible Student movement. Other early writers for the Watch Tower Society included J. H. Paton and W. I. Mann. The formation of the Watch Tower Society was announced in the April 1881 issue of Zion's Watch Tower. That year, the society received donations of $35,391.18.

=== Incorporation ===
On December 15, 1884, the society was incorporated as Zion's Watch Tower Tract Society in Pennsylvania as a non-profit, non-stock corporation with Russell as president. The corporation was located in Allegheny, Pennsylvania. In its charter, written by Russell, the society's purpose was stated as "the mental, moral and religious improvement of men and women, by teaching the Bible by means of the publication and distribution of Bibles, books, papers, pamphlets, and other Bible literature, and by providing oral lectures free for the people". The charter provided for a board of seven directors, three of whom served as officers—a president, vice-president (initially William I. Mann), and secretary-treasurer (initially Maria Russell).

The charter stipulated that the officers be chosen from the directors and be elected annually by ballot. Board members would hold office for life unless removed by a two-thirds vote by shareholders. Vacancies on the board resulting from death, resignation, or removal would be filled by a majority vote of the remaining board members within 20 days; if such vacancies were not filled within 30 days an appointment could be made by the president, with the appointments lasting only until the next annual corporation meeting, when vacancies would be filled by election.

Anyone subscribing to $10 or more of the Watch Tower Society's Old Testament Tracts or donating $10 or more to the society was deemed a voting member and entitled to one vote per $10 donated. Russell indicated that despite having a board and shareholders, the society would be directed by only two people—him and his wife Maria. Russell said that as of December 1893, he and his wife owned 3705, or 58 percent, of the 6383 voting shares, "and thus control the Society; and this was fully understood by the directors from the first. Their usefulness, it was understood, would come to the front in the event of our death... For this reason, also, formal elections were not held; because it would be a mere farce, a deception, to call together voting shareholders from all over the world, at great expense, to find upon arrival that their coming was useless, Sister Russell and myself having more than a majority over all that could gather. However, no one was hindered from attending such elections."

The influx of donations gradually diluted the proportion of the Russells' shares and in 1908 their voting shares constituted less than half the total. Russell emphasized the limitations of the corporation, explaining: "Zion's Watch Tower Tract Society is not a 'religious society' in the ordinary meaning of this term" He also stated, "This is a business association merely... It has no creed or confession. It is merely a business convenience in disseminating the truth." Incorporation of the society meant that it would outlive Russell, so individuals who wished to bequeath their money or property to him would not have to alter their will if he died before they did. On September 19, 1896, the name of the corporation was changed to Watch Tower Bible and Tract Society.

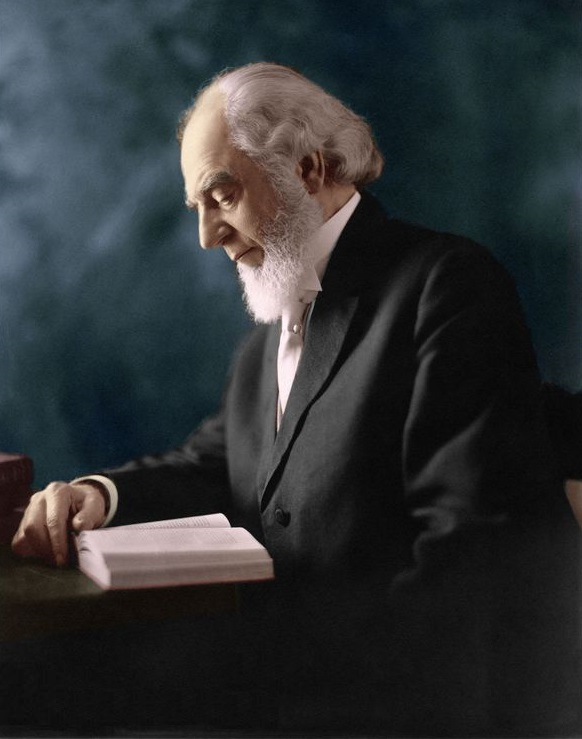
Charles Taze Russell, president (1884–1916) of the Watch Tower Society and founder of the Bible Student movement; colorized

From 1908, Russell required the directors to write out resignations when they were appointed so Russell could dismiss them by simply filling in the date. In 1909, Russell instructed legal counsel Joseph Franklin Rutherford to determine whether the Watch Tower Society's headquarters could be moved to Brooklyn, New York. Rutherford reported that because it had been established under Pennsylvania law, the corporation could not be registered in New York state, but suggested that a new corporation be registered there to do the society's work. Rutherford subsequently organized the formation of the People's Pulpit Association, which was incorporated on February 23, 1909, and wrote the charter which gave the president—to be elected for life at the first meeting—"absolute power and control" of its activities in New York. The society sold its buildings in Pittsburgh and moved staff to its new base in Brooklyn. Although all New York property was bought in the name of the New York corporation and all legal affairs of the society done in its name, Russell insisted on the continued use of the Watch Tower Bible and Tract Society name on all correspondence and publications.

The move from Pennsylvania to New York occurred during court proceedings over the breakdown of Russell's marriage. His wife Maria had been granted a "limited divorce" on March 4, 1908, but in 1909 returned to court in Pittsburgh to request an increase in alimony, which her former husband refused. Authors Barbara Grizzuti Harrison and Edmond C. Gruss have claimed Russell's move to Brooklyn was motivated by his desire to transfer from the jurisdiction of the Pennsylvania courts. They claim he transferred all his assets to the Watch Tower Society so he could declare himself bankrupt and avoid being jailed for failure to pay alimony.

In 1914, the International Bible Students Association was incorporated in Britain to administer affairs in that country. Like the People's Pulpit Association, it was a subsidiary of the Pennsylvania parent organization, and all work done through both subsidiaries was described as the work of the Watch Tower Society. The Watchtower noted: "The editor of The Watchtower is the President of all three of these Societies. All financial responsibility connected with the work proceeds from [the Pennsylvania corporation]. From it the other Societies and all the branches of the work receive their financial support... we use sometimes the one name and sometimes the other in various parts of our work—yet they all in the end mean the Watch Tower Bible and Tract Society, to which all donations should be made."

=== Leadership dispute ===
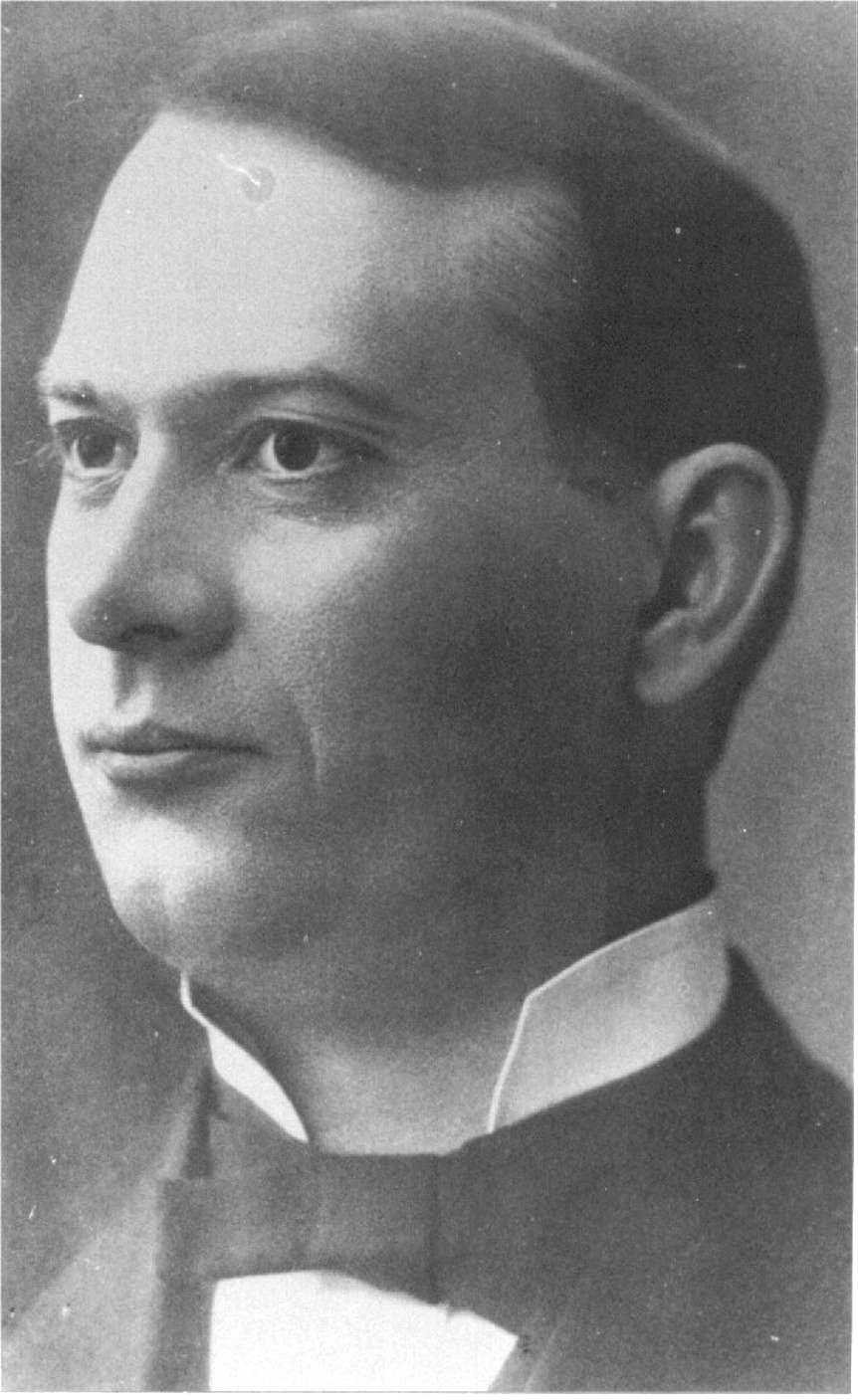
Joseph Franklin Rutherford, president of the Watch Tower Society (1917–1942)

Russell died on October 31, 1916, in Pampa, Texas, during a cross-country preaching trip. On January 6, 1917, board member and Watch Tower Society legal counsel Joseph Franklin Rutherford, aged 47, was elected president of the society, unopposed, at the Pittsburgh convention. Under his presidency, the role of the Watch Tower Society underwent a major change. By-laws passed by both the Pittsburgh convention and the board of directors stated that the president would be the executive officer and general manager of the society, giving him full charge of its affairs worldwide.

By June 1917, four of the seven Watch Tower Society directors, Robert H. Hirsh, Alfred I. Ritchie, Isaac F. Hoskins and James D. Wright, had decided they had erred in endorsing Rutherford's expanded powers of management, claiming Rutherford had become autocratic. Hirsh attempted to rescind the new by-laws and reclaim the powers of management from the president, but Rutherford later claimed he had by then detected a conspiracy among the directors to seize control of the society. In July, Rutherford gained a legal opinion from a Philadelphia corporation lawyer that none of his opposers were legally directors of the society.

On July 12, 1917, Rutherford filled what he claimed were four vacancies on the board, appointing A. H. Macmillan and Pennsylvania Bible Students W. E. Spill, J. A. Bohnet, and George H. Fisher as directors. Between August and November, the Watch Tower Society and the four ousted directors published a series of pamphlets, with each side accusing the other of ambitious and reckless behavior. The former directors also claimed Rutherford had required all headquarters workers to sign a petition supporting him and threatened dismissal for any who refused to sign. The former directors left the Brooklyn headquarters on August 8, 1917. On January 5, 1918, Rutherford was returned to office.

In May 1918, Rutherford and seven other Watch Tower Society directors and officers were arrested on charges of sedition under the federal Espionage Act. On June 21, 1918, they were sentenced to 20 years' imprisonment. Rutherford feared his opponents would gain control of the society in his absence, but on January 2, 1919, he learned he had been re-elected president at the Pittsburgh convention the day before. However, by mid-1919 about one in seven Bible Students had chosen to leave rather than accept Rutherford's leadership, forming groups such as The Stand Fast Movement, Paul Johnson Movement, Dawn Bible Students Association, Pastoral Bible Institute of Brooklyn, Elijah Voice Movement, and Eagle Society.

Although formed as a "business convenience" with the purpose of publishing and distributing Bible-based literature and managing the funds necessary for that task, the corporation from the 1920s began its transformation into the "religious society" Russell had insisted it was not, introducing centralized control and regulation of Bible Student congregations worldwide. In 1938, Rutherford introduced the term "theocracy" to describe the hierarchical leadership of Jehovah's Witnesses, with Consolation explaining: "The Theocracy is at present administered by the Watch Tower Bible and Tract Society, of which Judge Rutherford is the president and general manager." The society appointed "zone servants" to supervise congregations and in a Watchtower article, Rutherford declared the need for congregations to "get in line" with the changed structure.

=== Amendments to charter ===
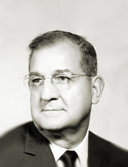
Nathan Homer Knorr, president (1942–1977) of the Watch Tower Society

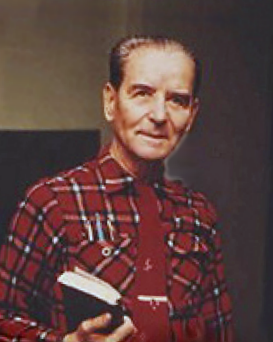
Frederick William Franz, president (1977–1992) of the Watch Tower Society

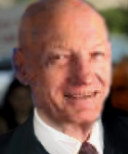
Milton George Henschel, president (1992–2000) of the Watch Tower Society

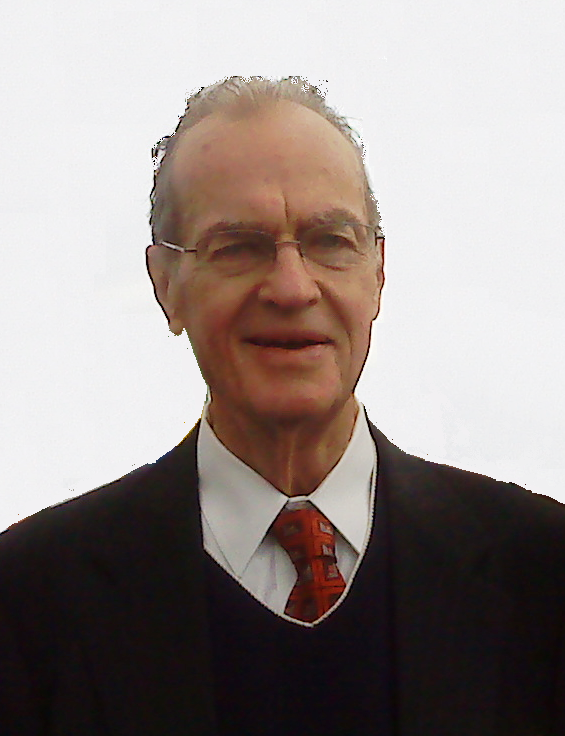
Don Alden Adams, president of the Watch Tower Society (2000–2014)

Following Rutherford's death in 1942, Nathan H. Knorr became president of the Watch Tower Society and subsequently introduced further changes to the role of the society. At a series of talks given in Pittsburgh on September 30, 1944, coinciding with the society's annual meeting, it was announced that changes would be made to the 1884 charter to bring it into "closer harmony with theocratic principles". The amendments, most of which were passed unanimously, significantly altered the terms of membership and stated for the first time that the society's purposes included preaching about God's kingdom, acting as a servant and governing agency of Jehovah's Witnesses, and sending missionaries and teachers for the public worship of God and Jesus Christ. The new charter, which took effect from January 1, 1945, included the following changes:

- An altered and expanded explanation of article II, detailing the purpose of the Watch Tower Society. This included the preaching of the gospel of God's kingdom to all nations; to print and distribute Bibles and disseminate Bible truths with literature explaining Bible truths and prophecy concerning the establishment of God's kingdom; to authorise and appoint agents, servants, employees, teachers evangelists, missionaries, ministers and others "to go all the world publicly and from house to house to preach Bible truths to persons willing to listen by leaving with such persons said literature and by conducting Bible studies thereon"; to improve people mentally and morally by instruction "on the Bible and incidental scientific, historical and literary subjects"; to establish and maintain Bible schools and classes; to "teach, train, prepare and equip men and women as ministers, missionaries, evangelists, preachers, teachers and instructors in the Bible and Bible literature, and for public Christian worship of Almighty God and Jesus Christ" and "to arrange for and hold local and worldwide assemblies for such worship".
- An amendment to article V, detailing the qualifications for membership of the Watch Tower Society. Each donation of $10 to the society funds had formerly entitled the contributor to one voting share; the amendment limited membership to "only men who are mature, active and faithful witnesses of Jehovah devoting full time to performance of one or more of its chartered purposes... or such men who are devoting part time as active presiding ministers or servants of congregations of Jehovah's witnesses". The amended article stipulated that "a man who is found to be in harmony with the purposes of the Society and who possesses the above qualifications may be elected as a member upon being nominated by a member, director or officer, or upon written application to the president or secretary. Such members shall be elected upon a finding by the Board of Directors that he possesses the necessary qualifications and by receiving a majority vote of the members." The amendment limited membership at any one time to between 300 and 500, including approximately seven residents of each of the 48 states of the US. It also introduced a clause providing for the suspension or expulsion of a member for wilfully violating the society's rules, or "becoming out of harmony with any of the Society's purposes or any of its work or for wilful conduct prejudicial to the best interests of the Society and contrary to his duties as a member, or upon ceasing to be a full-time servant of the Society or a part-time servant of a congregation of Jehovah's witnesses".
- An amendment to Article VII, dealing with the governance of the Watch Tower Society by its board of directors. The amendment deleted reference to adherence to the constitution and laws of Pennsylvania of the US. It also specified the powers of the board, including matters of finance and property.
- An amendment to article VIII, detailing the office holders of the Watch Tower Society and the terms of office and method of appointment of officers and directors. A clause stating that board members would hold office for life was deleted. The new clause provided for board membership for a maximum of three years, with directors qualifying for re-election at the expiration of their term.

=== Governing Body ===
In 1976, the direction of the Watch Tower Society and of the congregations of Jehovah's Witnesses worldwide came under the control of the Governing Body, reducing the power of the society's president. The society has described the change as "one of the most significant organizational readjustments in the modern-day history of Jehovah's Witnesses." Since 2000, the role of president of the Watch Tower Society has been held by individuals who are considered "helpers" to the Governing Body.

=== Presidents ===
Name	Date of birth	Date of death	Started	Ended
William Henry Conley	June 11, 1840	July 25, 1897	February 16, 1881	December 15, 1884
Incorporated
Charles Taze Russell	February 16, 1852	October 31, 1916	December 15, 1884	October 31, 1916
Joseph Franklin Rutherford	November 8, 1869	January 8, 1942	January 6, 1917	January 8, 1942
Nathan Homer Knorr	April 23, 1905	June 8, 1977	January 13, 1942	June 8, 1977
Frederick William Franz	September 12, 1893	December 22, 1992	June 22, 1977	December 22, 1992
Milton George Henschel	August 9, 1920	March 22, 2003	December 30, 1992	October 7, 2000
Don Alden Adams	January 16, 1925	December 30, 2019	October 7, 2000	2014
Robert Ciranko	March 9, 1947	–	2014	incumbent

== Operations ==
The corporation is a major publisher of religious publications, including books, tracts, magazines, and Bibles. By 1979, the Watch Tower Society had 39 printing branches worldwide. In 1990, it was reported that in one year the society printed 696 million copies of its magazines, The Watchtower and Awake! as well as another 35,811,000 pieces of literature worldwide, which are offered door-to-door by Jehovah's Witnesses. As of 2013, the society prints more than 43 million of its public issues of these magazines each month, totaling over 1 billion annually.

The Watch Tower Society describes its headquarters and branch office staff as volunteers rather than employees, and identifies them as members of the Worldwide Order of Special Full-Time Servants of Jehovah's Witnesses. Workers receive a small monthly stipend with meals and accommodation provided by the society. The "Bethel family" in the Brooklyn headquarters includes hairdressers, dentists, doctors, housekeepers, and carpenters, as well as shops for repairing personal appliances, watches, shoes, and clothing without charge for labor.

The Watch Tower Society does not file any publicly accessible financial figures, but reported in 2011 that it had spent more than $173 million that year "in caring for special pioneers, missionaries and traveling overseers in their field service assignments". Donations obtained from the distribution of literature are a major source of income, most of which is used to promote its evangelical activities.

Author James Beckford has claimed the status of voting members of the Watch Tower Society is purely symbolic. He said they cannot be considered to be representatives of the mass of Jehovah's Witnesses and are in no position to challenge the actions or authority of the society's directors.

== Property ownership ==
=== United States ===
The corporation was first located at 44 Federal Street, Allegheny, Pennsylvania (the city was annexed by Pittsburgh in 1907), but in 1889 moved to "Bible House", newly built premises at 56–60 Arch Street, Allegheny, owned by Russell's privately owned Tower Publishing Company. The new building contained an assembly hall seating about 200, as well as editorial, printing, and shipping facilities and living quarters for some staff. The title for the building was transferred in April 1898 to the Watch Tower Bible and Tract Society.

In 1909, the Watch Tower Society moved its base to Brooklyn. A four-story brownstone parsonage formerly owned by Congregationalist clergyman and social reformer Henry Ward Beecher at 124 Columbia Heights was converted to a residence for a headquarters staff of 30, as well as an office for Russell. A former Plymouth church building at 13–17 Hicks Street was purchased and converted into the Watch Tower headquarters, with room for 350 staff. It contained an 800-seat assembly hall, shipping department, and printing facilities.

The Watch Tower announced: "The new home we shall call 'Bethel,' and the new office and auditorium, 'The Brooklyn Tabernacle'; these names will supplant the term 'Bible House.'" In October 1909, an adjoining building at 122 Columbia Heights was bought. In 1911, a new nine-story residential block was built at the rear of the headquarters, fronting on Furman Street and overlooking the Brooklyn waterfront. The Brooklyn Tabernacle was sold in 1918 or 1919.

Printing facilities were established in Myrtle Street, Brooklyn in 1920. The February 1, 1920, issue of The Watch Tower was printed by the Watch Tower Society at the plant. Two months later the plant began printing The Golden Age. In 1922, the printing factory was moved to a six-story building at 18 Concord Street, Brooklyn. In 1926 it moved to larger premises, a new eight-story building at 117 Adams Street, Brooklyn, at which time the society's headquarters was rebuilt and enlarged. In December 1926, a building at 126 Columbia Heights was bought. A month later the three buildings from 122–126 Columbia Heights were demolished and rebuilt for accommodation and executive offices, using the official address of 124 Columbia Heights.

In 1946, the property surrounding the Adams Street factory was bought to expand printing operations. When completed in 1949, the factory occupied an entire block, bounded by Adams, Sands Pearl, and Prospect Streets. Five more properties adjoining 124 Columbia Heights were purchased for a 10-story building. In the late 1950s a property at 107 Columbia Heights, across the road from 124 Columbia Heights, was bought. In 1960 a residential building for staff was constructed there. More residences were built at 119 Columbia Heights in 1969.

The Watchtower detailed further expansion in the 1950s and 1960s: "In 1956, a 13-story building was constructed at 77 Sands Street. Then just across the street, another (10-story building) was purchased in 1958. In 1968, an adjoining 11-story new printing factory was completed. Along with the factory at 117 Adams Street, these fill out four city blocks of factories that are all tied together by overhead bridges. Then in November 1969, the Squibb complex located a few blocks away was purchased."

The Watch Tower Society bought the Towers Hotel at 79–99 Willow Street in 1974 for accommodation, which is connected to the society's other Columbia Heights properties via tunnels. In 1978, a property at 25 Columbia Heights underwent renovation for use as offices. In the early 1980s properties were bought at 175 Pearl Street and 360 Furman Street for factory and office use. A building at 360 Furman Street was bought in March 1983 and renovated, providing almost 9 hectares of floor space for shipping, carpentry, and construction. The Bossert Hotel at 98 Montague Street was bought in 1983 as a residence building.

97 Columbia Heights, the former site of the Margaret Hotel, was purchased in 1986. It was ideally located next to the WTBTS residences at 107 and 124 Columbia Heights and it could easily tie in with the main complex on the other side of the street by means of an under-street tunnel. An 11-story residential building was erected on the site to house 250 workers. A property at 90 Sands Street was bought in December 1986. A 30-story residential building for 1,000 workers was completed on the site in 1995. A 1996 publication listed other Watch Tower residential buildings in Brooklyn, including the 12-story Bossert Hotel, at 34 Orange Street (1945), the Standish Arms Hotel at 169 Columbia Heights (1981), 67 Livingston Street (1989), and 108 Joralemon Street (1988).

Two properties known as Watchtower Farms, at Wallkill, 160 kilometres (99 mi) north of Brooklyn and totaling 1,200 hectares (3,000 acres), were bought in 1963 and 1967. Factories were erected in 1973 and 1975. In 2012–2014 the Watch Tower Society added an office building, residence building, and garage. In 1984, the society paid $2.1 million for a 270-hectare farm at Patterson, New York for a development that included 624 apartments, garages for 800 cars, and a 149-room hotel. Other rural purchases included a 220 hectares (540 acres) farm near South Lansing, New York, and a 60 hectares (150 acres) farm near Port Murray, New Jersey.

In February 2009, the Watch Tower Society paid $11.5 million for 100 hectares of land in Ramapo, New York, for an administration and residential complex. The site was reported to be planned as a base for about 850 Watch Tower workers, creating a compound combining residential and publishing facilities currently located in Brooklyn. A Witness spokesman said the land was currently zoned for residential uses, but an application would be made to rezone it, adding that "Construction is several years in the future."

A year later, the Watch Tower Society announced it planned to move its world headquarters from Brooklyn to a proposed eight-building complex, replacing the pre-existing four-building complex on a 100-hectare Watch Tower property in Warwick, New York, 1.5 km from its Ramapo site. A Watch Tower presentation to Warwick planning authorities said the complex would house up to 850 people. In July 2012, the Warwick Planning Commission approved the environmental impact statement for building the Warwick site. In July 2013, Warwick approved building plans for the multiple-building complex of the new headquarters, including four residence buildings of 588 rooms for about 1,000 people.

In August 2011, a 50-acre property was bought in Tuxedo, New York, with 184,000 square foot building, for $3.2 million, six miles from the Warwick site to facilitate the staging of machinery and building materials. The Watch Tower Society bought a 48-unit apartment building in Suffern, New York, near Warwick, New York, for housing temporary construction workers in June 2013. In December 2014, the society bought the 250-unit Rivercrest Luxury Apartments in Fishkill, Dutchess County, New York. The sale price was not released, though taxes on the sale indicated a transaction of $57 million. The current leases will not be renewed.

==== Brooklyn property sales ====
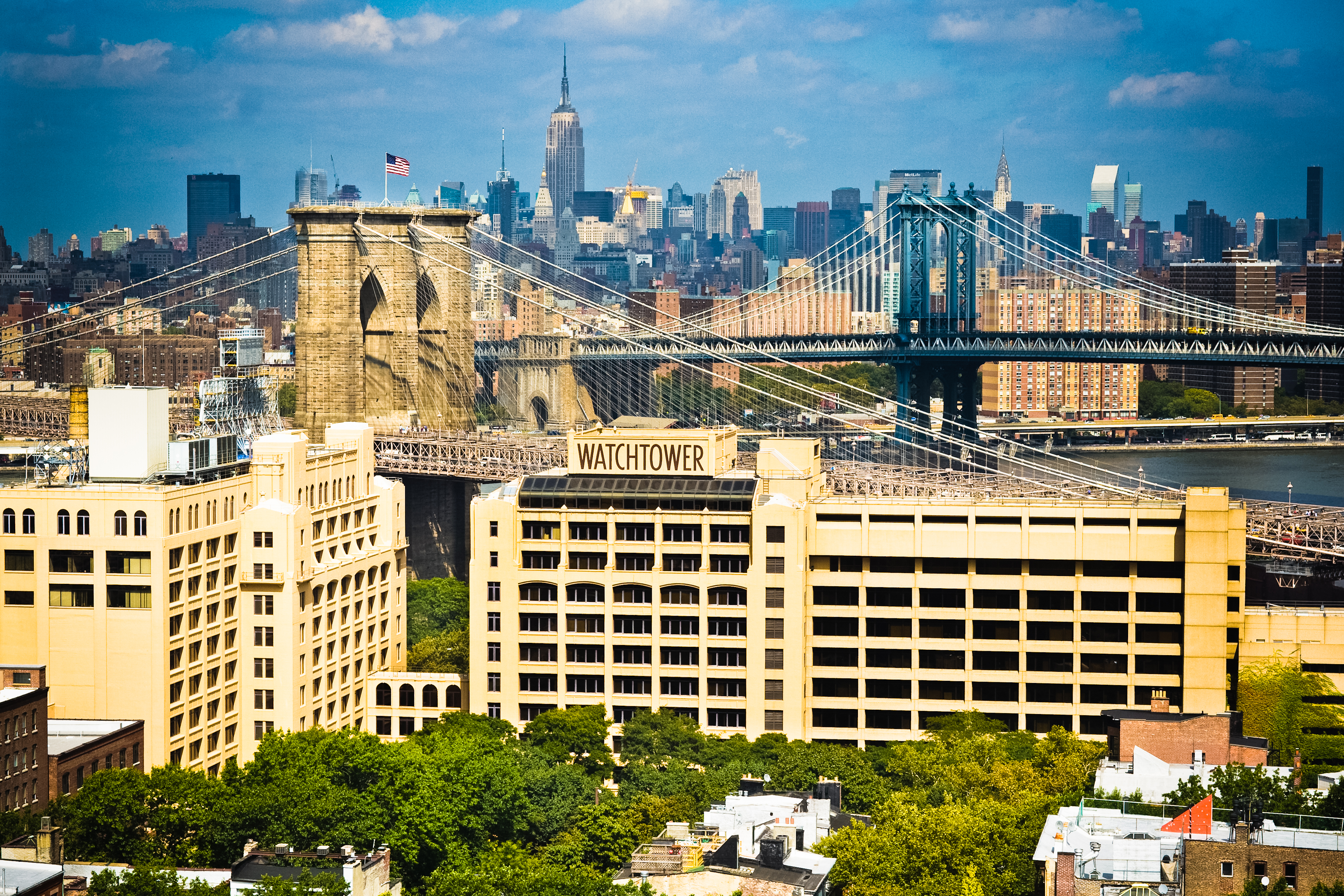
The former Watch Tower Society headquarters in Columbia Heights, Brooklyn.

In 2004, the Watch Tower Society began transferring its printing operations to its Wallkill factory complex. The move triggered the sale of a number of Brooklyn factory and residential properties, including:

- 360 Furman Street, sold in 2004 for $205 million;
- 67 Livingston Street, (nicknamed the Sliver) sold in 2006 for $18.6 million.
- 89 Hicks Street, sold in 2006 for $14 million.
- Standish Arms Hotel, 169 Columbia Heights, sold in 2007 for $50 million.
- 183 Columbia Heights, bought in 1986, offered for sale in 2007, and sold in April 2012 for $6.6 million.
- 161 Columbia Heights, bought in 1988, offered for sale in 2007 and sold in March 2012 for $3 million.
- 165 Columbia Heights, offered for sale in 2007 and sold in January 2012 for $4.1 million.
- 105 Willow Street, offered for sale in 2007 and sold in April 2012 for $3.3 million.
- 34 Orange Street, offered for sale in 2007 and sold in November 2012 for $2,825,000.
- Bossert Hotel, 98 Montague Street, bought in 1983, offered for sale in 2008. sold in 2012 to a hotel developer, Rosewood Realty Group, for $81 million.
- 50 Orange Street, bought in 1988, renovated to sell in 2006 and sold in December 2011 for $7.1 million.
- 67 Remsen Street, offered for sale in July 2012, and sold the same year for $3.25 million.
- Three adjoining properties (173 Front Street, 177 Front Street, and 200 Water Street) sold together for 30.6 million in April 2013 to Urban Realty Partners.
- 55 Furman Street, 400,000 sq. ft., is for sale as of June 2013.
- Five adjoining properties (175 Pearl Street, 55 Prospect Street, 81 Prospect Street, 117 Adams Street, and 77 Sands Street totaling 700,000 sq. ft.), offered for sale in September 2011, under contract as of July 2013 to a three company buy-out. A sixth building (90 Sands Street, about 500,000 sq. ft., a 505-room, 30-story building) in this sale will be released in 2017, after the scheduled completion of the Jehovah's Witnesses' new headquarters in Warwick, New York. The properties are under contract for $375 million at the completion of the sale.
- Two private parking lots are for sale as of June 2013.
- 124 Columbia Heights, bought in 1909, was sold in May 2016 to Florida Panthers' Vincent Viola for $105 million.
- In 2016, three more properties valued at an estimated $850 million to $1 billion—including the headquarters building—were put up for sale. The Watch Tower Society sold the 25/30 Columbia Heights complex along with adjoining 50 and 58 Columbia Heights and 55 Furman Street sites on August 3, 2016, for $340 million.

In 2011, the Watch Tower Society was reported to still own 34 properties in Brooklyn; a 2009 report calculated "a dozen or more" properties in the Brooklyn area. In a 2010 news report, the society said it was "not actively promoting" the sale of eight Brooklyn properties still on the market. The society's remaining nine unsold Brooklyn properties are 97, 107, and 119 Columbia Heights; 80 and 86 Willow Street; 21 Clark Street (Towers Hotel); parking lots at 67 Furman Street, 1 York Street and 85 Jay Street; and 90 Sands Street already arranged to sell in 2017. Many sold buildings are to be emptied by 2017. The Furman Street properties and parking lots are for sale currently as stated above.

=== Other countries ===
In 1900, the Watch Tower Society opened its first overseas branch office in Britain. Germany followed in 1903 and Australia in 1904. By 1979 the society had 39 printing branches throughout the world, with facilities transferred to farming properties in many countries, including Brazil, Sweden, Denmark, Canada, and Australia. In 2011, the society had 98 branch offices worldwide reporting to New York directly; other nations' offices report to large branches nearby.

== Directors ==
=== Since 1916 ===
Name	Tenure began	Tenure ended	Length of tenure	Source(s)
Charles Taze Russell (Note: Secretary-Treasurer 1881–1884, President 1884–1916)	February 16, 1881	October 31, 1916	35 years, 8 months and 15 days	
William Edwin Van Amburgh (Note: Secretary-Treasurer 1903–1947)	August 1901	February 7, 1947	45 years and 5 or 6 months	
J. D. Wright	1904	July 12, 1917 (de facto)	12 or 13 years (de facto)	
I. F. Hoskins	1908	July 12, 1917 (de facto)	8 or 9 years (de facto)	
A. I. Ritchie (Note: Vice-President ?–1917)	1911	July 12, 1917 (de facto)	5 or 6 years (de facto)	
Henry Clay Rockwell	October 31, 1916 (fl.)	February 8, 1917		
Joseph Franklin Rutherford (Note: President 1917–1942)	October 31, 1916 (fl.)	January 8, 1942		
Andrew N. Pierson (Note: Vice-President 1917–1918)	November 2, 1916	January 5, 1918	1 year, 2 months and 3 days	
R. H. Hirsh	March 29, 1917 (de facto)	July 12, 1917 (de facto)	3 months and 13 days (de facto)	
John A. Bohnet	July 12, 1917 (de facto)	January 4, 1919	1 year, 5 months and 23 days (de facto)	
W. E. Spill	July 12, 1917 (de facto)	January 3, 1920	2 years, 5 months and 22 days (de facto)	
George H. Fisher	July 12, 1917 (de facto)	January 4, 1919	1 year, 5 months and 23 days (first term; de facto)	
George H. Fisher	January 3, 1920	October 1, 1923	3 years, 8 months and 28 days (second term)	
Alexander Hugh Macmillan	July 12, 1917 (de facto)	January 4, 1919	1 year, 5 months and 23 days (first term; de facto)	
Alexander Hugh Macmillan	January 3, 1920	October 1, 1938	18 years, 8 months and 28 days (second term)	
Charles H. Anderson (Note: Vice-President 1918–1919 (Acting President))	January 5, 1918	November 1, 1926 (de jure)	8 years, 9 months and 27 days (de jure)	
Richard Harvey Barber	January 4, 1919	January 3, 1920	11 months and 30 days	
W. F. Hudgings	January 4, 1919	October 1, 1923	4 years, 8 months and 27 days	
Charles A. Wise (Note: Vice-President 1919–1940/1941 (Acting President 1919))	January 4, 1919	June 10, 1940	21 years, 5 months and 6 days	
John Adam Baeuerlein	October 1, 1923	October 31, 1929	6 years and 30 days	
Hugo Henry Riemer	October 1, 1923	March 31, 1965	41 years, 5 months and 30 days	
Arthur R. Goux	1924/1925 (fl., de facto)	1924/1925 (fl., de facto)		
Robert J. Martin	November 1, 1926	September 23, 1932	5 years, 10 months and 22 days	
Edward J. Lueck	October 31, 1929	October 31, 1935	6 years	
Thomas James Sullivan	October 31, 1932	September 5, 1973	40 years, 10 months and 5 days	
Gilbert Yarwood McCormick	October 31, 1935	October 1, 1938	2 years, 11 months and 1 day	
William Pratt Heath, Jr.	October 1, 1938	October 2, 1944	6 years and 1 day	
Grant Suiter (Note: Secretary-Treasurer 1947–1983)	October 1, 1938	November 22, 1983	45 years, 1 month and 21 days	
Nathan Homer Knorr (Note: Vice-President 1940/1941–1942, President 1942–1977)	June 10, 1940	June 8, 1977	36 years, 11 months and 29 days	
Hayden Cooper Covington (Note: Vice-President 1942–1945)	January 13, 1942	September 24, 1945	3 years, 8 months and 11 days	
Frederick William Franz (Note: Vice-President 1945–1977, President 1977–1992)	October 2, 1944	December 22, 1992	48 years, 2 months and 20 days	
Lyman Alexander Swingle (Note: Secretary-Treasurer 1983/1984–2000)	October 1, 1945	September 8, 1985 (fl.)		
Milton George Henschel (Note: Vice-President ?–1992, President 1992–2000)	October 1, 1947	October 7, 2000	53 years and 6 days	
John Otto Groh	April 5, 1965	October 2, 1973 (fl.)		
William Kirk Jackson	October 2, 1973	?		
Don Alden Adams (Note: President 2000–2014)	October 7, 2000	2014	13 or 14 years	
Danny L. Bland (Note: Secretary-Treasurer since at least 2007)	August 10, 2007 (fl.)	Incumbent		
John Nelson Wischuk	2014 (fl.)	2015 (fl.)		
Philip D. Wilcox	2014 (fl.)	2018 (fl.)		
William F. Malenfant (Note: Vice-President fl. 2014–fl. 2017)	2014 (fl.)	2018 (fl.)		
David G. Sinclair	2014 (fl.)	2018 (fl.)		
David W. Schafer (Note: Vice-President since 2014)	2014 (fl.)	Incumbent		
Robert Louis Ciranko (Note: President since 2014)	2014 (fl.)	Incumbent		
Richard E. Devine (Note: Vice-President since 2017)	2016 (fl.)	Incumbent		
Enrique R. Ford	2019 (fl.)	Incumbent		
Mark J. Noumair	2019 (fl.)	Incumbent		
Robert V. Luccioni	2019 (fl.)	Incumbent		

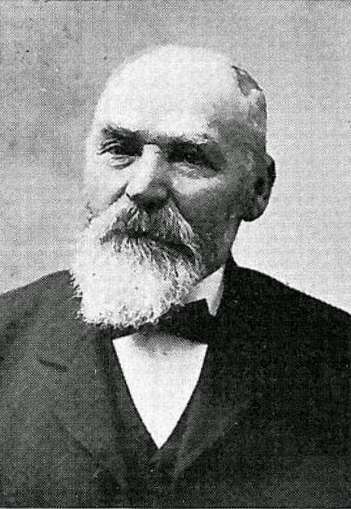
Henry Weber, vice-president of the Watch Tower Society (fl. 1894–1904)

=== Before 1916 ===
- J. H. Giesey (director ?–?, vice-president ?–1908)
- William M. Wright (?–1906)
- Henry Weber (director fl. 1894–1904, vice-president fl. 1894–1904)
- Rose J. Ball (director fl. 1894)
- Simon O. Blunden (director 1884–1908)
- Maria Frances Russell (née Ackley) (director 1884–1900, secretary-treasurer 1884–fl. 1894, then-wife of Charles Taze Russell)
- W. C. M(a)cMillan (director 1884–1898)
- J. B. Adamson (director 1884–1895)
- W. I. Mann (director 1884–1892, vice-president fl. 1884)
- J. F. Smith (director 1884–1892)

== Criticism ==
Critics, including Raymond Franz, Edmond C. Gruss, and James Penton, have accused the Watch Tower Society of being authoritarian, controlling, and coercive in its dealings with Witnesses. Franz, a former Governing Body member, has claimed the society's emphasis on the term "theocratic organization" to describe the authority structure of Jehovah's Witnesses, which places God at the apex of its organization, is designed to exercise control over every aspect of the lives of Jehovah's Witnesses and condition them to think it is wrong for them to question anything the society publishes as truth.

The Watch Tower Society has been accused of employing techniques of mind control on Witnesses, including the direction to avoid reading criticism of the organization, frequent and tightly controlled "indoctrination" meetings, regimentation, social alienation, and elaborate promises of future rewards. Aside from life stories, all Watch Tower Society magazine articles and other publications are written anonymously and correspondence from the society does not typically indicate a specific author or personal signature.

== See also ==
- Criticism of Jehovah's Witnesses
- History of Jehovah's Witnesses
- Organizational structure of Jehovah's Witnesses

== Bibliography ==
- Penton, M. James (1997). Apocalypse Delayed: The Story of Jehovah's Witnesses (2nd ed.). University of Toronto Press. ISBN 0-8020-7973-3.
- Rogerson, Alan (1969). Millions Now Living Will Never Die. Constable, London.
- Wills, Tony (2006). A People For His Name. Lulu Enterprises. ISBN 978-1-4303-0100-4.
- Watch Tower Bible & Tract Society (1975). 1975 Yearbook of Jehovah's Witnesses. Watch Tower Bible & Tract Society.
- Watch Tower Bible & Tract Society (1959). Jehovah's Witnesses in the Divine Purpose. Watch Tower Bible & Tract Society.
- Watch Tower Bible & Tract Society (1993). Jehovah's Witnesses—Proclaimers of God's Kingdom. Watch Tower Bible & Tract Society.
- Macmillan, A. H. (1957). Faith on the March. Prentice-Hall. Archived from the original on September 7, 2009.
- Rutherford, J. F. (August 1, 1917a). "Harvest Siftings" (PDF). Watch Tower Bible & Tract Society. Archived from the original (PDF) on July 15, 2011.
- Rutherford, J. F. (October 1, 1917b). "Harvest Siftings, Part II" (PDF). Watch Tower Bible & Tract Society. Archived from the original (PDF) on July 15, 2011.
- Pierson, A. N.; et al. (September 1, 1917). "Light After Darkness" (PDF). Archived from the original (PDF) on July 15, 2011.
- Johnson, Paul S. L. (November 1, 1917). "Harvest Siftings Reviewed" (PDF). Archived from the original (PDF) on July 15, 2011.
- Grizzuti Harrison, Barbara (1978). Visions of Glory – A History and a Memory of Jehovah's Witnesses. Simon & Schuster. ISBN 978-0-7091-8013-5.
- Gruss, Edmond C. (2003). The Four Presidents of the Watch Tower Society. Xulon Press. ISBN 1-59467-131-1.
- Holden, Andrew (2002). Jehovah's Witnesses: Portrait of a Contemporary Religious Movement. Routledge. ISBN 0-415-26609-2.
- Franz, Raymond (2007). Crisis of Conscience. Commentary Press. ISBN 978-0-914675-23-5.
- Botting, Heather; Gary Botting (1984). The Orwellian World of Jehovah's Witnesses. University of Toronto Press. ISBN 0-8020-6545-7.
