= Frederick Franz =

American Jehovah's Witness (1893–1992)

Frederick William Franz
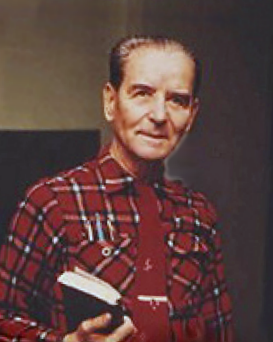
- Born: September 12, 1893; Covington, Kentucky, U.S.
- Died: December 22, 1992 (aged 99); Brooklyn, New York, U.S.
- Occupation: President of the Watch Tower Bible and Tract Society of Pennsylvania
- Movement: Jehovah's Witnesses
- Relatives: Raymond Franz (nephew)

Frederick William Franz (September 12, 1893 – December 22, 1992) was a president of the Watch Tower Bible and Tract Society of Pennsylvania, the legal entity used to administer the work of Jehovah's Witnesses, and he also was a member of the Governing Body of Jehovah's Witnesses. He had previously served as vice-president of the same corporation from 1945 until 1977 when he replaced Nathan H. Knorr as president. His position was administrative, as the Governing Body assumed control of all Jehovah's Witness corporations in 1976. He remained president until his death in 1992.

== Early life and education ==
Franz was born on September 12, 1893, in Covington, Kentucky. He was baptized in the Lutheran Church, but attended Catholic services as a child as a matter of convenience, before later attending the Presbyterian Church.

He graduated from Woodward High School in Cincinnati, Ohio, in 1911 and attended the University of Cincinnati, where he studied liberal arts, modern Greek and biblical Greek, with the intention of becoming a Presbyterian preacher. He knew German and could read Latin, Greek and in later years self-taught Spanish, Portuguese, French and Hebrew.

== Career ==
Franz' association with the Bible Students began after he read the booklet Where are the Dead? by John Edgar. After studying the literature of Charles Taze Russell, he was baptized as a Bible Student. In a 1987 article, Franz gave the date of his baptism as April 5, 1914, though the actual date was November 30, 1913.

In 1920, he joined the Watch Tower headquarters staff in Brooklyn, New York, and in 1926 became a member of the editorial staff as a Bible researcher and writer for the society's publications. Upon the death of Watch Tower president Joseph Rutherford, Franz became head of the editorial department, and in 1945 he replaced Hayden C. Covington as vice-president of the Watch Tower Society. Franz was the society's leading theologian. He is cited as a leading figure in the preparation of the Witnesses' first editions of the New World Translation of the Bible. Franz' nephew and fellow Governing Body member Raymond Franz resigned from the Governing Body and was subsequently disfellowshipped in 1981 during his presidency.

Franz continued to contribute to Watch Tower Society literature until his death in 1992 at the age of 99. He was succeeded as president of the Watch Tower Society by Milton G. Henschel.

== Role in eschatology ==
In 2010, the Watch Tower Society asserted that the "generation" of 1914—regarded by Jehovah's Witnesses as the last generation before the battle of Armageddon—includes persons whose lives "overlap" with "the anointed who were on hand when the sign began to become evident in 1914." In 2015, Franz was cited as an example of one of the last members of the "anointed" alive in 1914, suggesting that the "generation" would include any individuals "anointed" up until his death in 1992 at the earliest.

Preceded by Nathan H. Knorr	President of Watch Tower Bible and Tract Society of Pennsylvania; June 22, 1977 – December 22, 1992	Succeeded by Milton G. Henschel
