= Nathan Knorr =

Third president of the incorporated Watch Tower Bible and Tract Society (1905–1977)

Nathan Homer Knorr
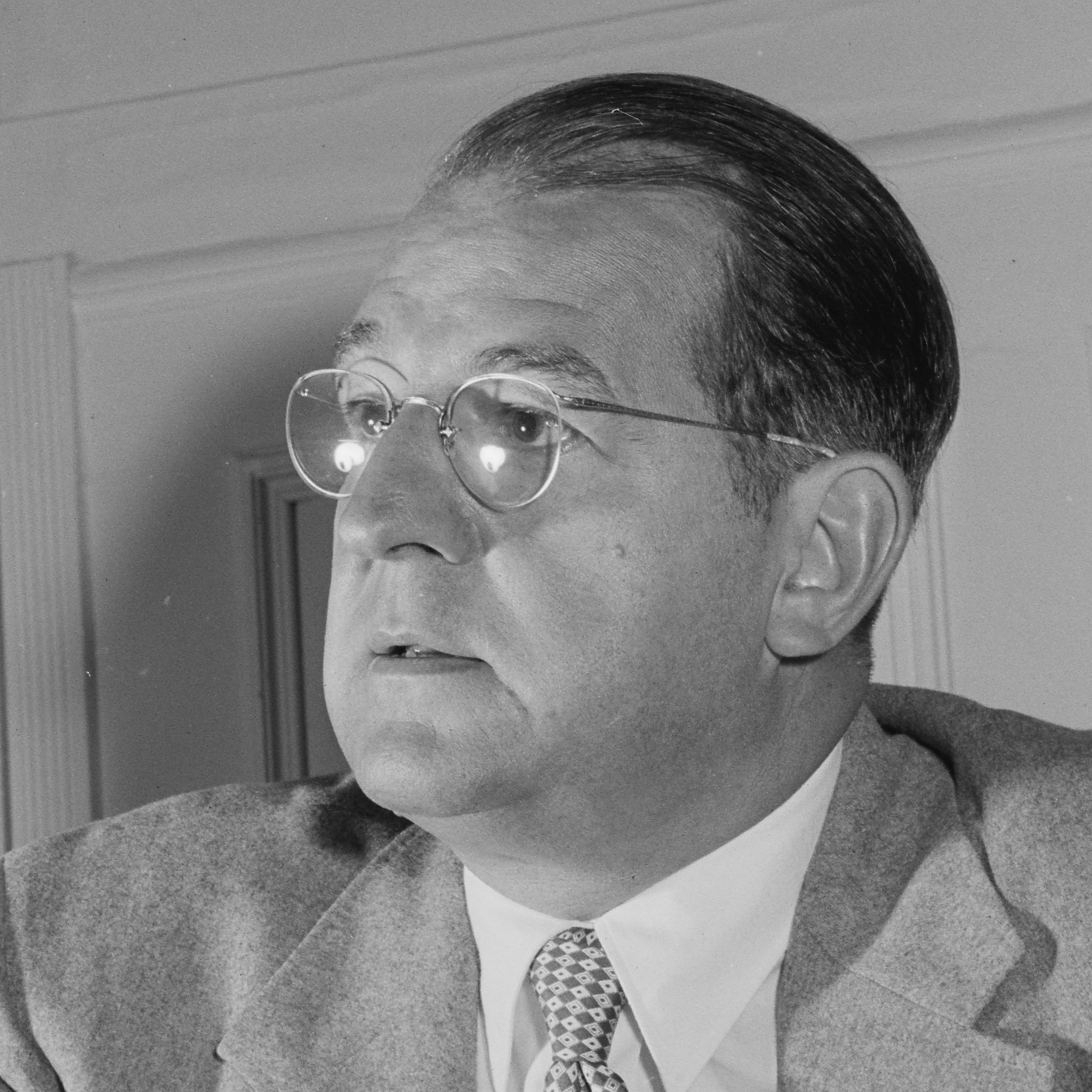
- Knorr in September 1955
- Born: April 23, 1905; Bethlehem, Pennsylvania, U.S.
- Died: June 8, 1977 (aged 72); Wallkill, New York, U.S.
- Occupation: President of the Watch Tower Bible and Tract Society
- Movement: Jehovah's Witnesses
- Spouse: Audrey Mock (m. 1953)

Nathan Homer Knorr (April 23, 1905 – June 8, 1977) was a Christian minister and the third president of the incorporated Watch Tower Bible and Tract Society (called Watch Tower Bible and Tract Society of Pennsylvania since 1955). He was appointed president in January 1942, replacing Joseph Franklin Rutherford, who had served in the position since 1917. Knorr was also a member of the Governing Body of Jehovah's Witnesses since 1971.

== Early life and education ==
Nathan Knorr was born in Bethlehem, Pennsylvania. At age 16, he began to show interest in the International Bible Students. He left the Reformed Church in 1922. He was baptized on July 4, 1923, as a Bible Student following a baptism talk by Frederick W. Franz, with whom Knorr became close friends.

In 1923, at the age of eighteen, coinciding with his graduation from Allentown High School in Pennsylvania, Knorr assumed the role of a full-time minister and received an invitation to join the staff at the international headquarters and printing facility of the Jehovah's Witnesses in Brooklyn.

== Career ==
Knorr became a volunteer at the Watch Tower headquarters in Brooklyn on September 6, 1923. He became its factory manager in September 1932.

In January 1934, at age 28, Knorr was elected director of the Peoples Pulpit Association, now the Watchtower Bible and Tract Society of New York, Inc. He was made its vice president in 1935.

In January 1942, Knorr became president of the International Bible Students Association and the corporations now known as the Watch Tower Bible and Tract Society of Pennsylvania, and Watchtower Bible and Tract Society of New York. Knorr married Audrey Mock in 1953.

=== Jehovah's Witnesses ===
Knorr contributed significantly to Jehovah's Witnesses, with an intense focus on education. Within a month of his taking office, arrangements were made for an Advanced Course in Theocratic Ministry, a school that featured Bible research and public speaking. In September 1942, Knorr suggested that the Society establish another school to train missionaries for service in foreign countries. The suggestion was unanimously approved by the board of directors. The first class of the Gilead School, the name given to this missionary school, commenced February 1, 1943.

Knorr arranged for the creation of new branch offices in many countries. In 1942, when he became president, there were 25 branch offices worldwide. By 1946, despite World War II, the number of branch offices increased to 57. Over the next 30 years, the number of branch offices increased to 97.

Knorr began a campaign of real estate acquisition in Brooklyn to expand the organisation's world headquarters, expanded printing production throughout the world, and organized a series of international assemblies that dwarfed those of Rutherford in the 1920s. In 1958, more than 253,000 Witnesses gathered at two New York City venues, Yankee Stadium, and the Polo Grounds, for an eight-day convention where 7,136 were baptised. Other large conventions were held in the U.S., Canada, and Germany.

The doctrine of not accepting blood transfusions was also introduced during Knorr's leadership.

==== Organizational adjustments ====
From October 1, 1972, there were adjustments in the oversight of the congregations of Jehovah's Witnesses. The writing of Aid to Bible Understanding led to a new understanding of the Bible's references to elders and "older men" and seems to have been the catalyst for the denomination to adjust its organizational structure. A revision to the Watch Tower Society's organizational manual in 1972 explained, "it is noteworthy that the Bible does not say that there was only one 'older man', one overseer, in each congregation. Rather, it indicates that there were a number of such."

There would no longer be one congregation servant, or overseer, but a body of elders and ministerial servants. One elder would be designated chairman, but all the elders would have equal authority and share the responsibility for making decisions.

By 1975, the denomination had more than two million members. The chairmanship of the Governing Body was also impacted. In December 1975, authority over Jehovah's Witnesses passed from the president of the Watch Tower Society to the Governing Body of Jehovah's Witnesses. Beginning January 1976, the Governing Body formed several committees to oversee publishing, writing, teaching, service and personnel. Knorr worked with the new arrangement, until illness shortly before his death forced his move from the world headquarters in Brooklyn, New York. Following Knorr's death in June 1977, Frederick William Franz succeeded him as corporation president.

== Death ==
Knorr died on June 8, 1977, from a cerebral tumor while under hospice care at Watchtower Farms in Wallkill, New York.

== Publications ==
Publications used by Jehovah's Witnesses that were released during Knorr's tenure include:

- "All Scripture Is Inspired Of God And Beneficial"
- Awake! magazine, which replaced Consolation
- "Equipped For Every Good Work"
- From Paradise Lost to Paradise Regained
- "Let God Be True"
- "Make Sure Of All Things"
- New World Translation of the Holy Scriptures.

== See also ==
- Jehovah's Witnesses publications
- Organizational structure of Jehovah's Witnesses

Preceded by Joseph F. Rutherford	President of Watch Tower Bible and Tract Society of Pennsylvania; January 13, 1942 – June 8, 1977	Succeeded by Frederick W. Franz
