= Public university =

University funded by public means

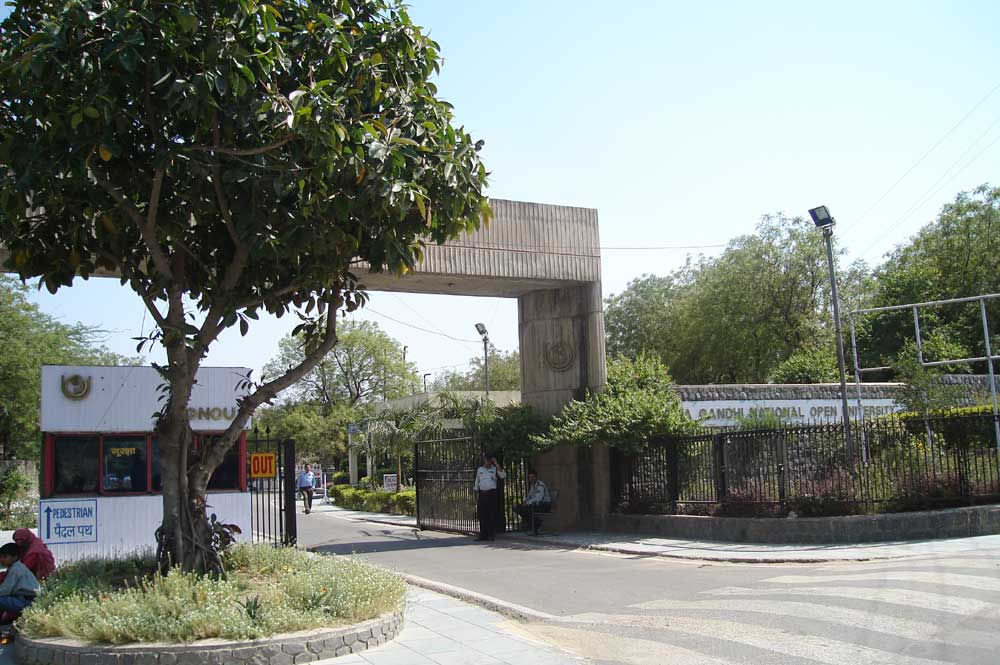
With over three million students, Indira Gandhi National Open University in Delhi, India, is one of the largest public universities in the world.

A public university, state university, or public college is a university or college that is owned by the state or that receives significant funding from a government. Whether a national university is considered "public" varies from one country (or region) to another, largely depending on the specific education landscape. In contrast a private university is usually owned and operated by a private corporation (not-for-profit or for profit). Both types are often regulated, but to varying degrees, by the government.

== International definitions ==
The Organisation for Economic Co-operation and Development (OECD) defines universities as public or private based on control. A university is considered private "if its overall control and management rest with a non-governmental organisation (e.g. a church, trade union, business enterprise or foreign or international agency) and if most of the members of its governing board are not selected by a public agency", otherwise it is considered public. Private institutions are further subdivided into "government-dependent" (a university that either "receives 50% or more of its core funding from government agencies" or where "teaching personnel are paid by a government agency or by the government directly", and "independent" (one that "receives less than 50% of its core funding from government agencies and whose teaching personnel are not paid by a government agency").

== Africa ==
=== Algeria ===
In Algeria, public universities are a key part of the education system, and education is considered a right for all citizens. Access to these universities requires passing the Baccalaureate (Bac) exam, with each institution setting its own grade requirements (out of 20) for different majors and programs. Notable public universities include the University of Algiers, University of Oran, and University of Mentouri Constantine.

=== Egypt ===
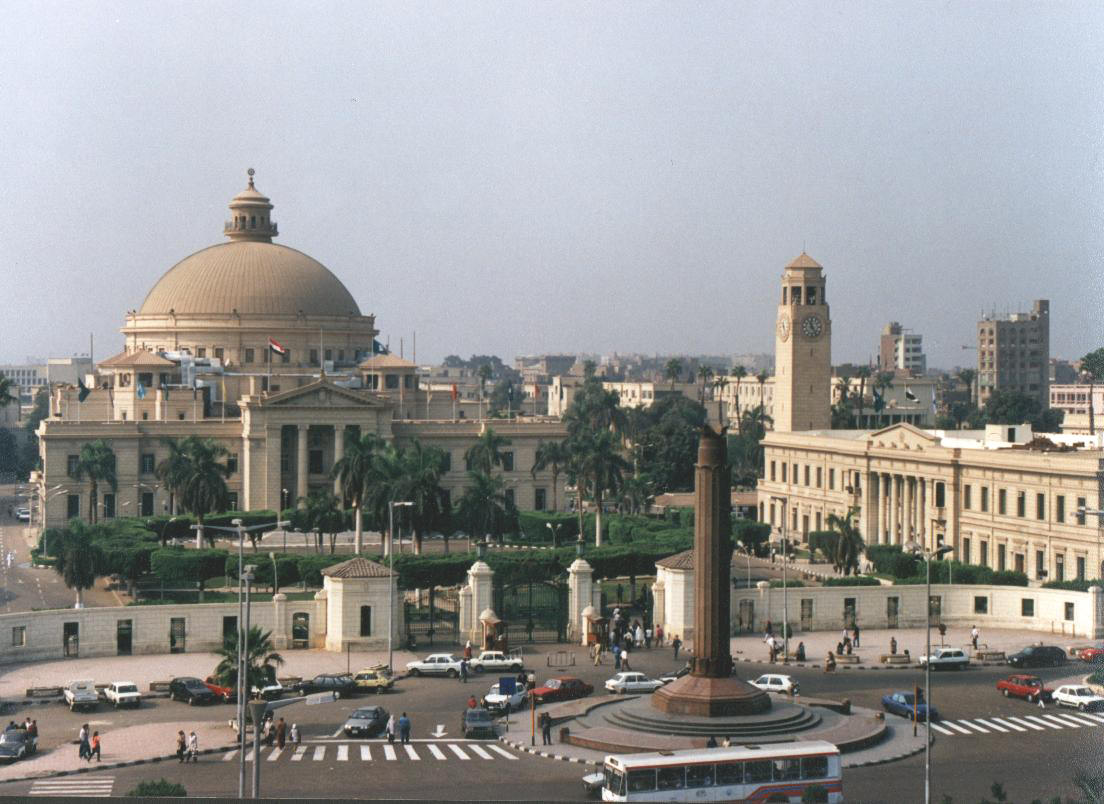
Cairo University in Giza, Egypt

In Egypt, Al-Azhar University was founded in 970 AD as a madrasa; it formally became a public university in 1961 and is one of the oldest institutions of higher education in the world. In the 20th century, Egypt opened many other public universities with government-subsidized tuition fees, including Cairo University in 1908, Alexandria University in 1912, Assiut University in 1928, Ain Shams University in 1957, Helwan University in 1959, Beni-Suef University in 1963, Zagazig University in 1974, Benha University in 1976, and Suez Canal University in 1989.

=== Kenya ===
In Kenya, the Ministry of Education controls all public universities. Students enroll after completing an 8–4–4 educational program system and attaining a mark of C+ or above. Students who meet the criteria set annually by the Kenya Universities and Colleges Central Placement Service receive government sponsorship, with the government providing part of their university or college fees. Students are also eligible for a low-interest loan from the Higher Education Loan Board; students must pay back the loan after completing their higher education.

=== Nigeria ===
In Nigeria, both the federal and state governments may establish public universities.

=== South Africa ===
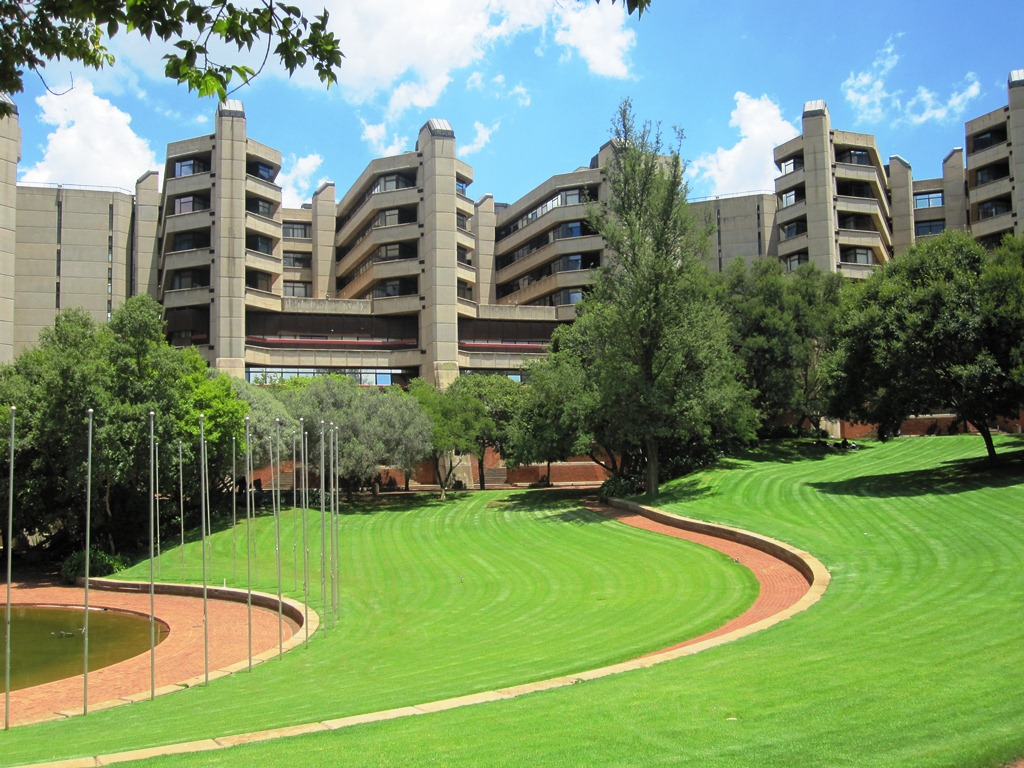
University of Johannesburg in Johannesburg, South Africa

South Africa has 26 public universities which are members of universities in South Africa. These are categorized as traditional or comprehensive universities.

=== Tunisia ===
In Tunisia, the Ministry of Higher Education and Scientific Research controls public universities and guarantees admission to students who earn a Tunisian Baccalaureate. Using a state website, the students make a wish list of the universities they want to attend, with the highest-ranking students getting priority choices. Universities rank students according to the results of their baccalaureate.

== Asia ==
=== Bangladesh ===
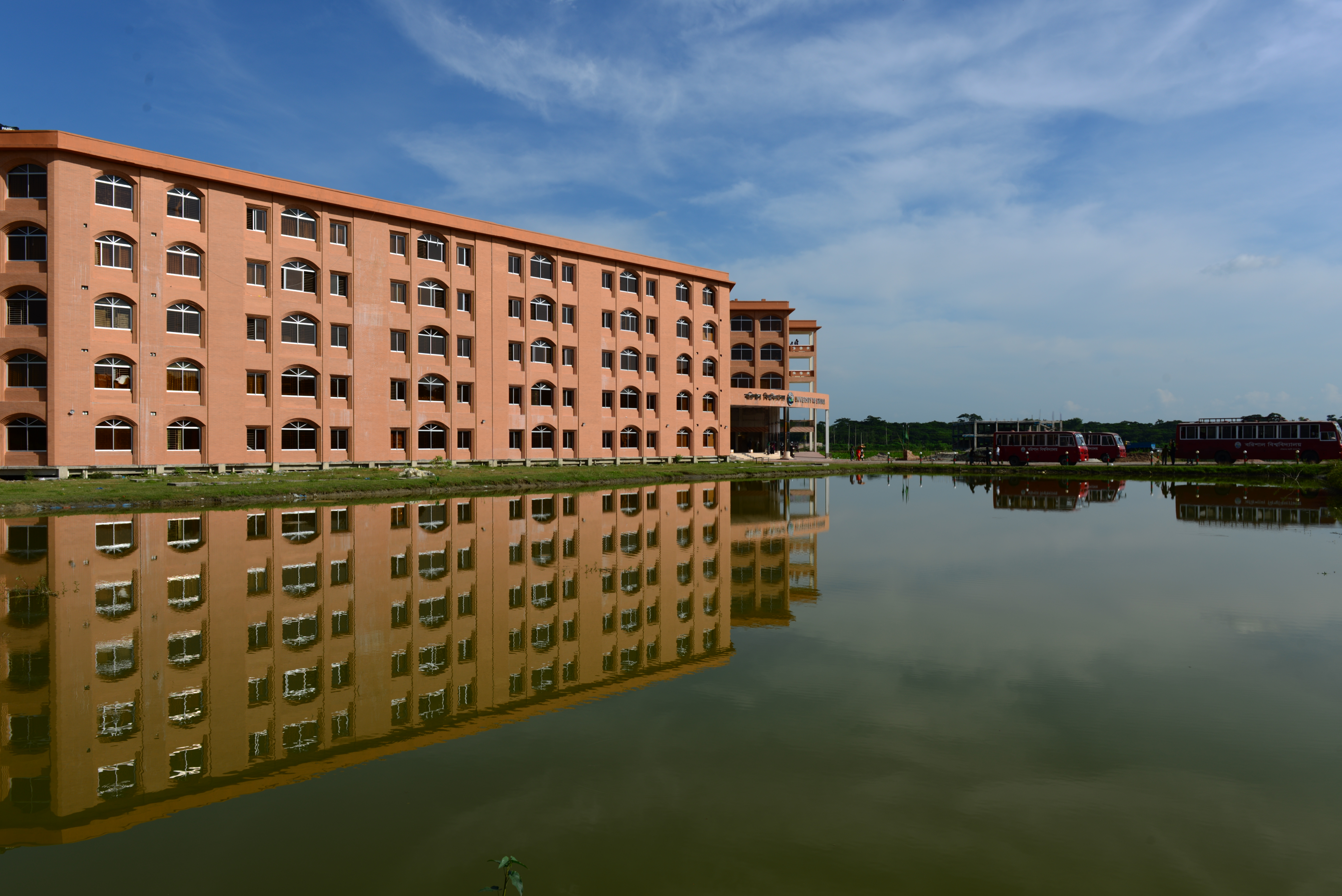
University of Barishal in Barishal, Bangladesh

There are 56 public universities in Bangladesh as of September 2025. They are overseen by the University Grants Commission which was created by the government in 1973.

=== Brunei ===
Most universities in Brunei are public.

=== China ===
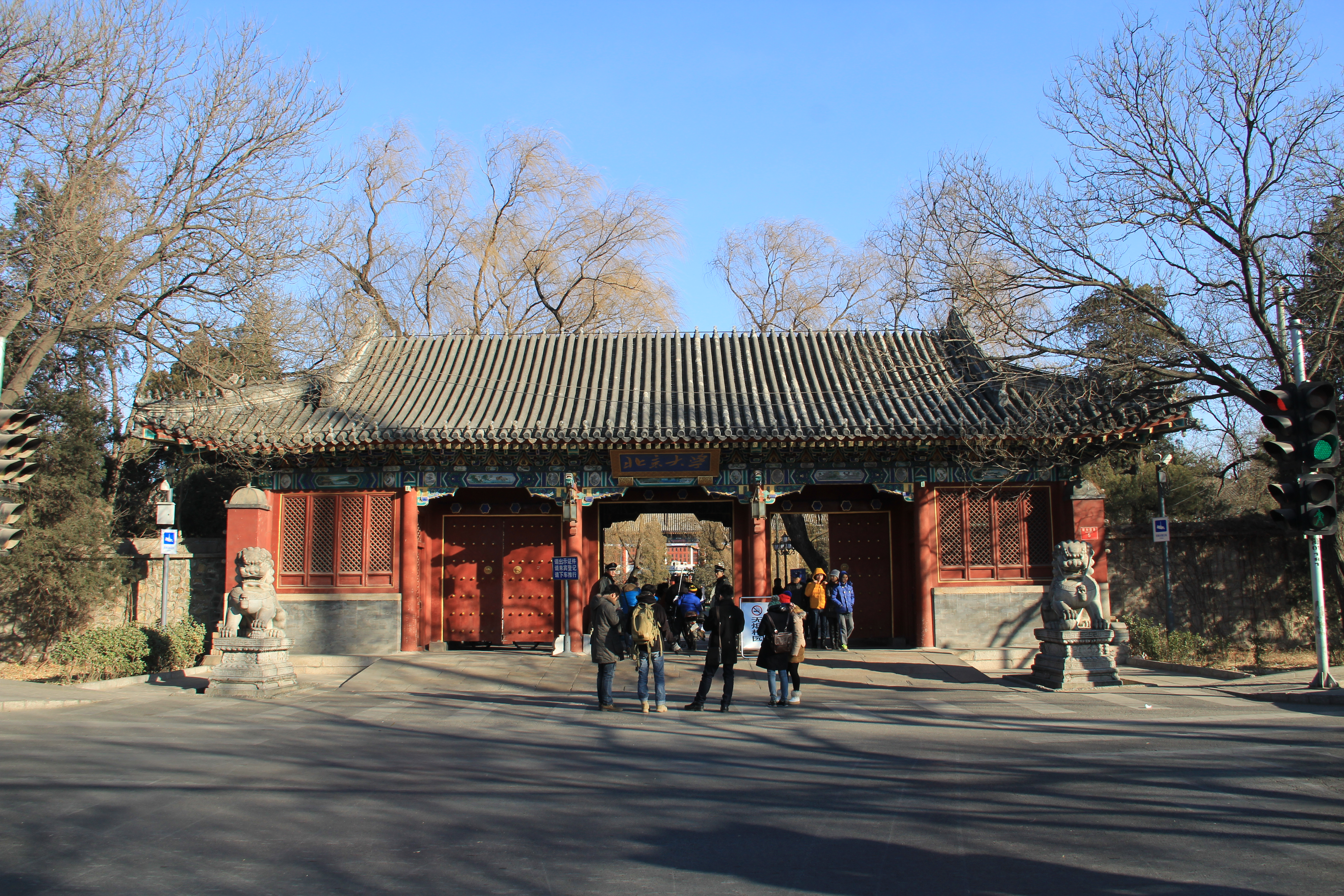
Peking University in Beijing, China

In China nearly all universities and research institutions are public. Typically, provincial governments run public universities. However, some are administered by municipal governments or are national, which the central government directly administers. Private undergraduate colleges exist but are primarily vocational colleges sponsored by private entities. Private universities can award bachelor's degrees. Public universities tend to enjoy a higher reputation domestically and globally.

=== Hong Kong ===
The University Grants Committee funds eight public universities in Hong Kong. The Hong Kong Academy for Performing Arts also receives funding from the government. There are four self-financing universities, namely Hong Kong Metropolitan University, Hong Kong Shue Yan University, Hang Seng University of Hong Kong, and Saint Francis University.

=== India ===
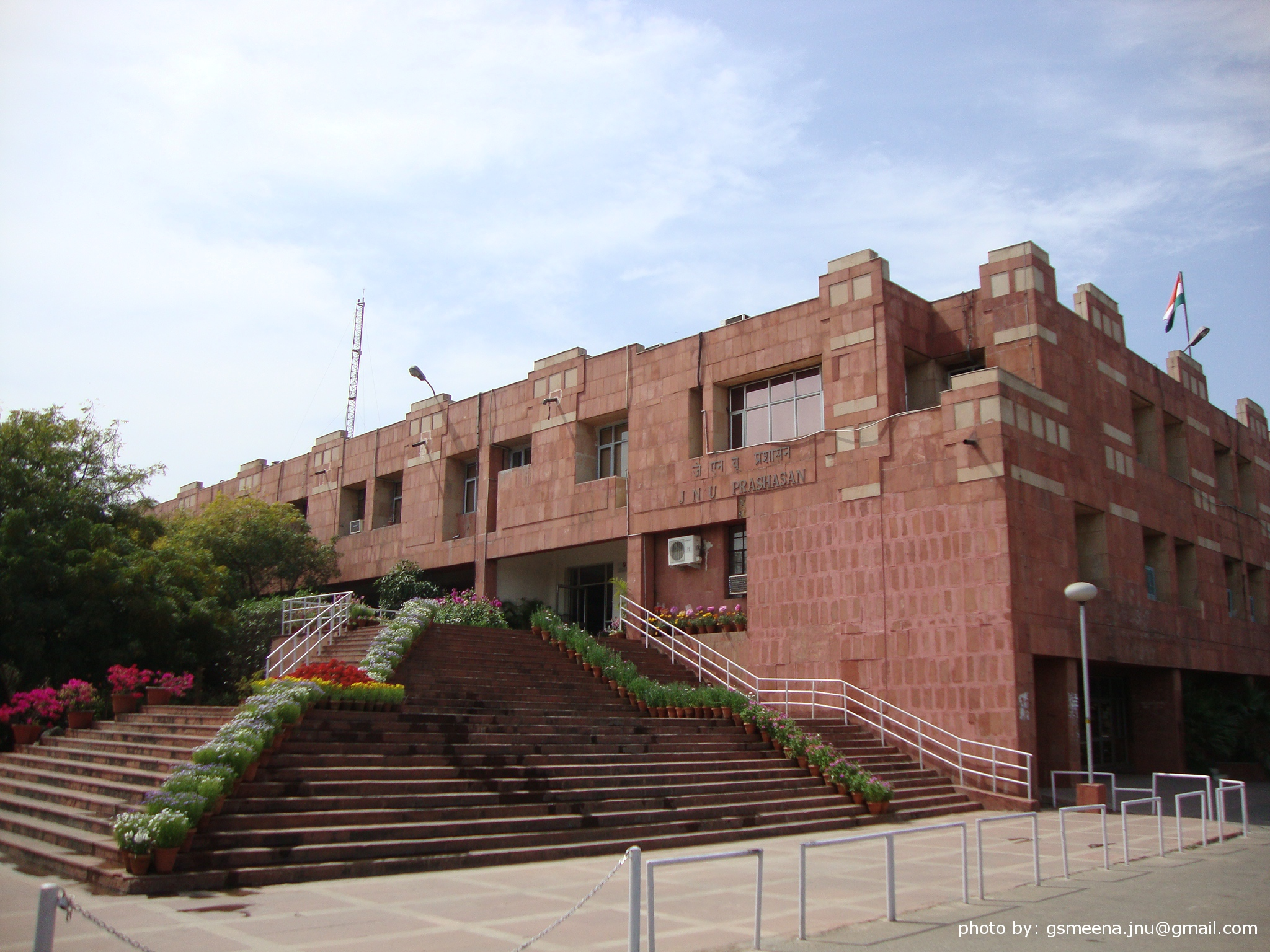
Jawaharlal Nehru University in Delhi, India

In India, most universities and nearly all research institutions are public. Some private undergraduate colleges exist but most are engineering schools that are affiliated with public universities. Private schools can be partially aided by the national or state governments. India also has an "open" public university, the Indira Gandhi National Open University which offers distance education. In terms of the number of enrolled students, it is now the largest university in the world with over four million students.

=== Indonesia ===
Sebelas Maret University in Surakarta, Indonesia

In Indonesia, the government supports public universities in each province. Funding comes through the Ministry of Education, Culture, Research, and Technology and the provincial and municipal governments.

=== Iran ===
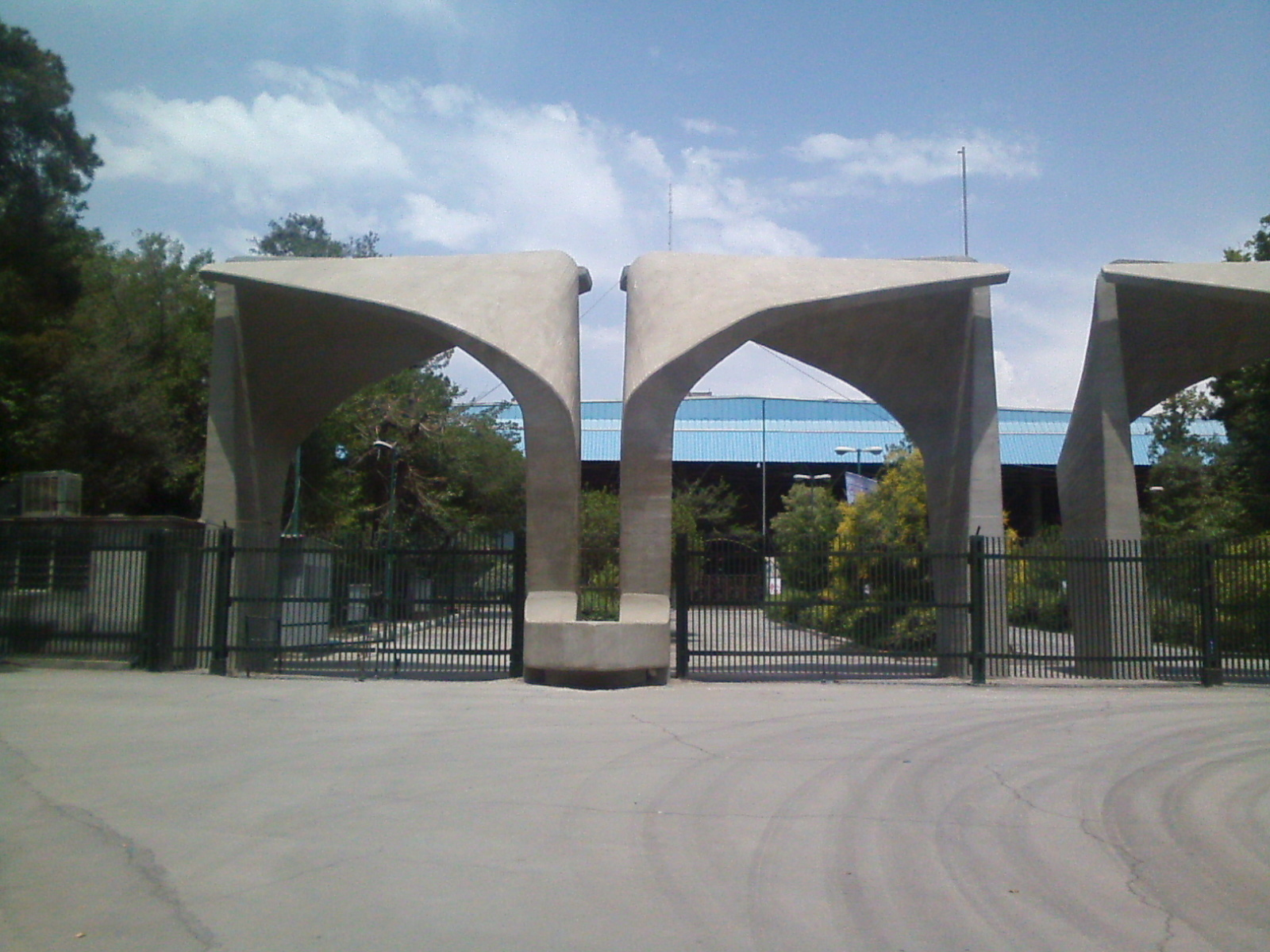
University of Tehran in Tehran, Iran

Some of the public universities in Iran offer tuition-free and tuition-based programs. State-run universities are highly selective and competitive.

=== Israel ===
There are ten official universities in Israel, of which nine are public, a few dozen colleges, and about a dozen foreign university extensions. The Council for Higher Education in Israel supervises all of these institutions academically. Only a university, not a college, can issue doctoral degrees in Israel.

=== Japan ===
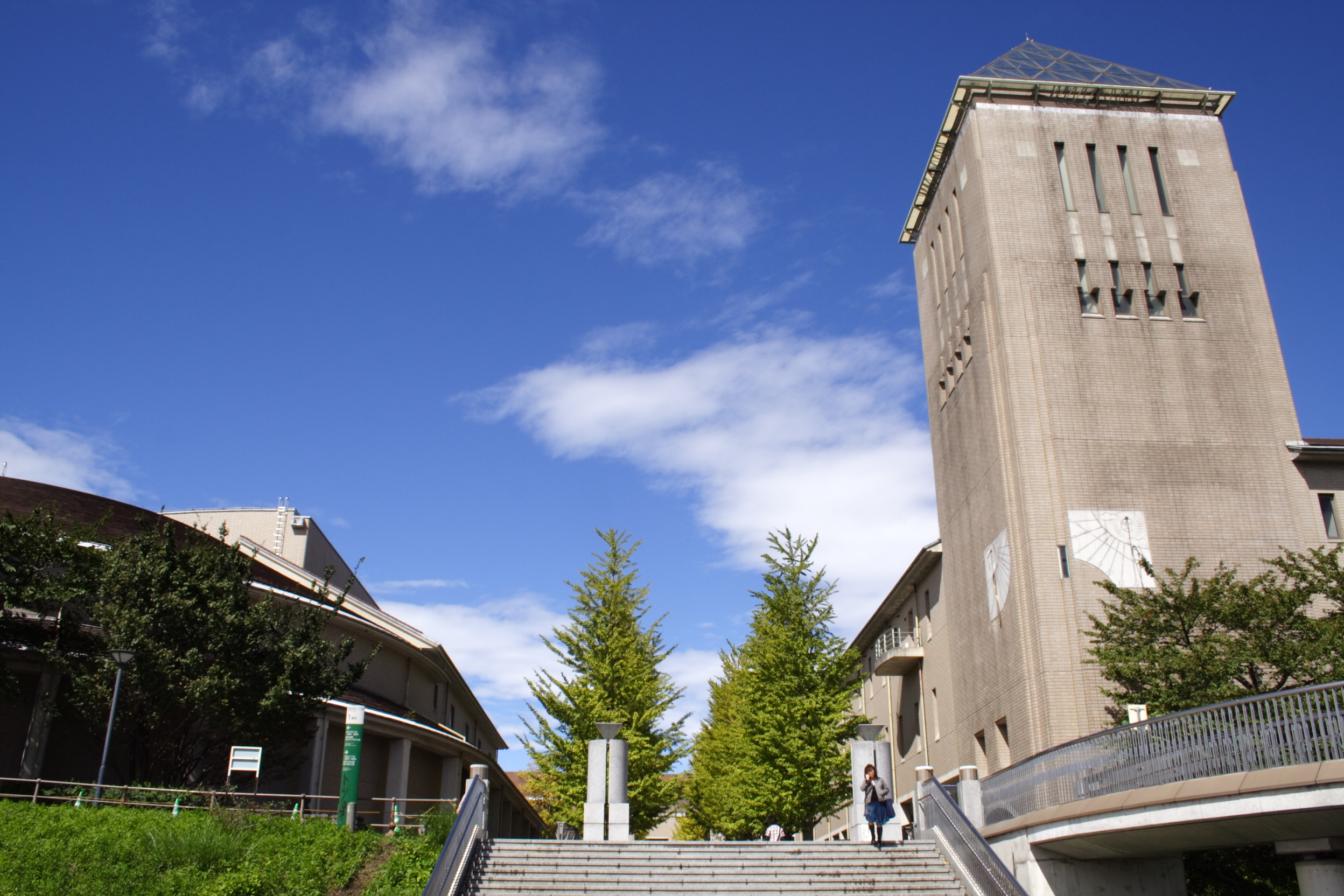
Tokyo Metropolitan University in Tokyo, Japan

In Japan, public universities are run by local governments, either prefectural or municipal. According to the Ministry of Education, public universities have "provided an opportunity for higher education in a region and served the central role of intellectual and cultural base for the local community in the region" and are "expected to contribute to social, economical and cultural development in the region". This contrasts with the research-oriented aspects of national universities.

In 2010, 127,872 students were attending 95 public universities, compared to 86 national universities and 597 private universities in Japan. Many public universities are relatively new; in 1980, there were only 34 public universities in Japan. Since July 2003, public universities may incorporate under the Local Independent Administrative Institutions Law.

=== South Korea ===
In South Korea, most public universities are national. There are 29 national universities, eighteen special universities, and ten educational universities. In addition, there are two national colleges and the Korea National Open University which offers distance learning. The University of Seoul is a public municipal university.

=== Kyrgyzstan ===
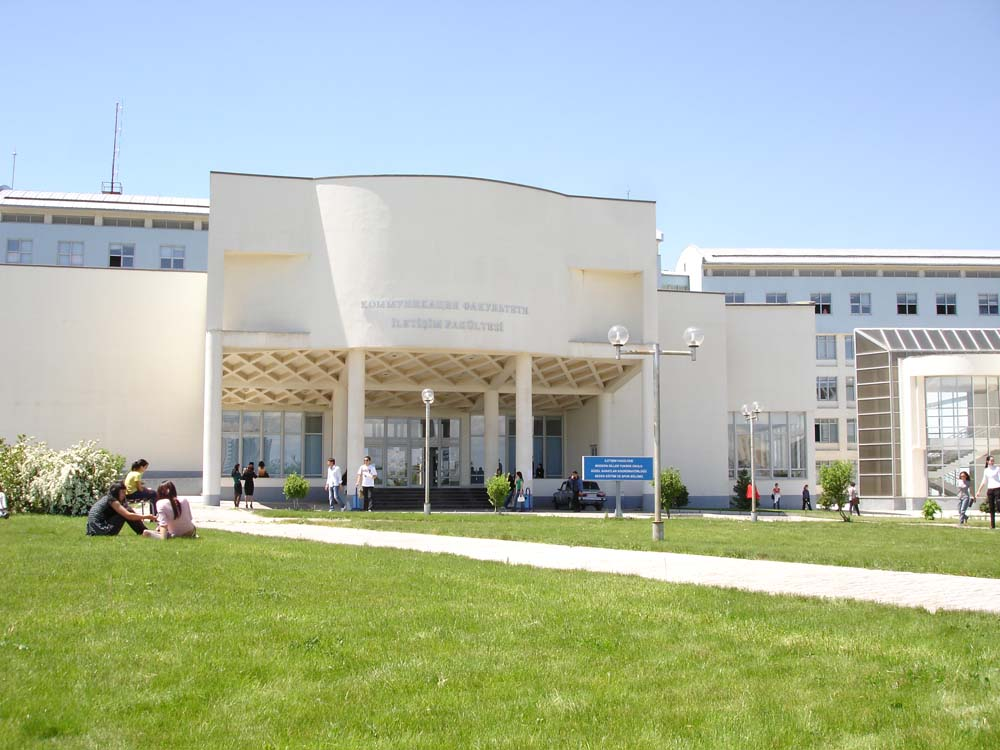
Manas University in Bishkek, Kyrgyzstan

Manas University in Kyrgyzstan is a public higher education institution that offers associate degrees, undergraduate degrees, and graduate and postgraduate degrees.

=== Macau ===
The University of Macau, Macao Polytechnic University, and Macao University of Tourism are the public universities in Macau.

=== Malaysia ===
There are twenty public universities in Malaysia, funded by the government but governed as self-managed institutions.

=== Nepal ===
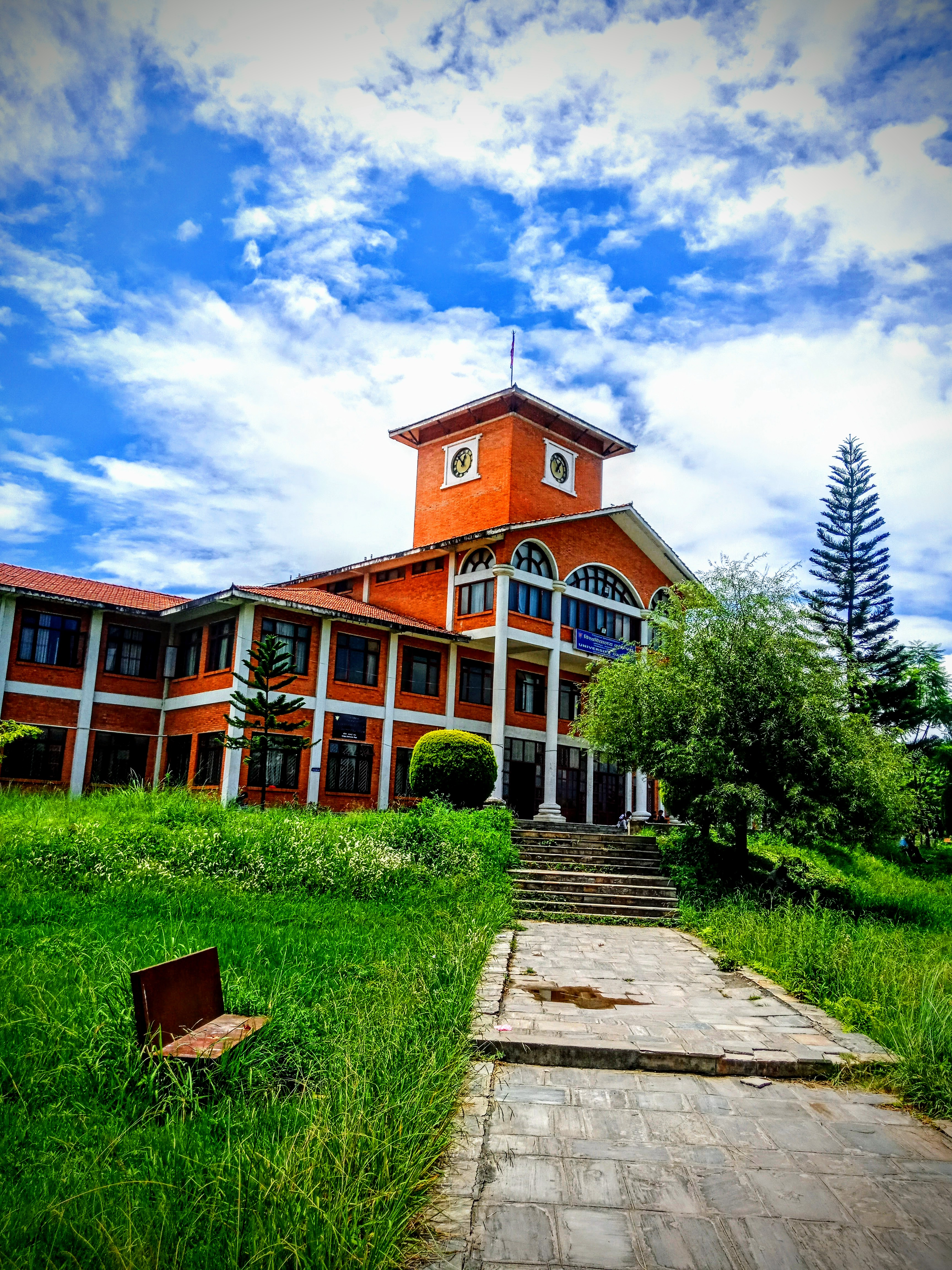
Tribhuwan University in Kirtipur, Kathmandu, Nepal

Tribhuvan University was the first public university in Nepal. It operates through six different institutes and is affiliated with various colleges. There are government-funded Purbanchal University and Pokhara University.

=== Pakistan ===
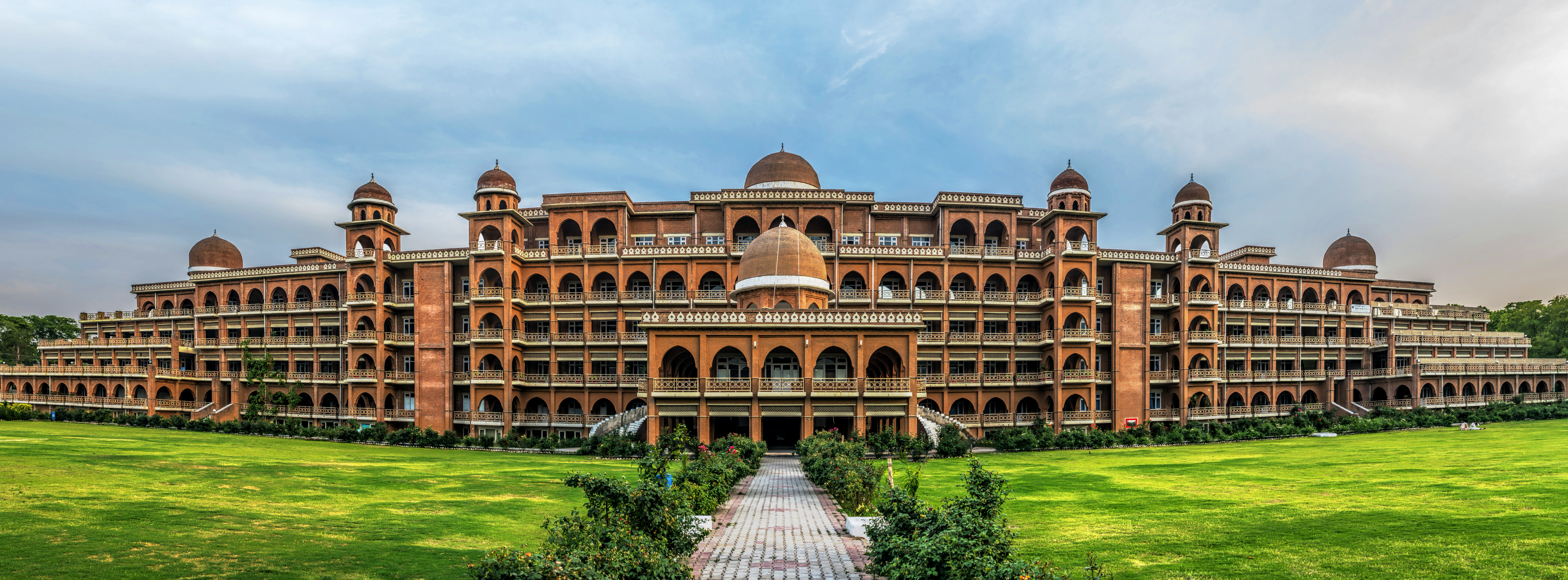
University of Peshawar in Peshawar, Pakistan

There are 107 public universities in Pakistan, compared to 76 private universities. University of the Punjab is the biggest public university, followed by University of Karachi. The public universities receive guidance and recognition from the Higher Education Commission.

=== Philippines ===
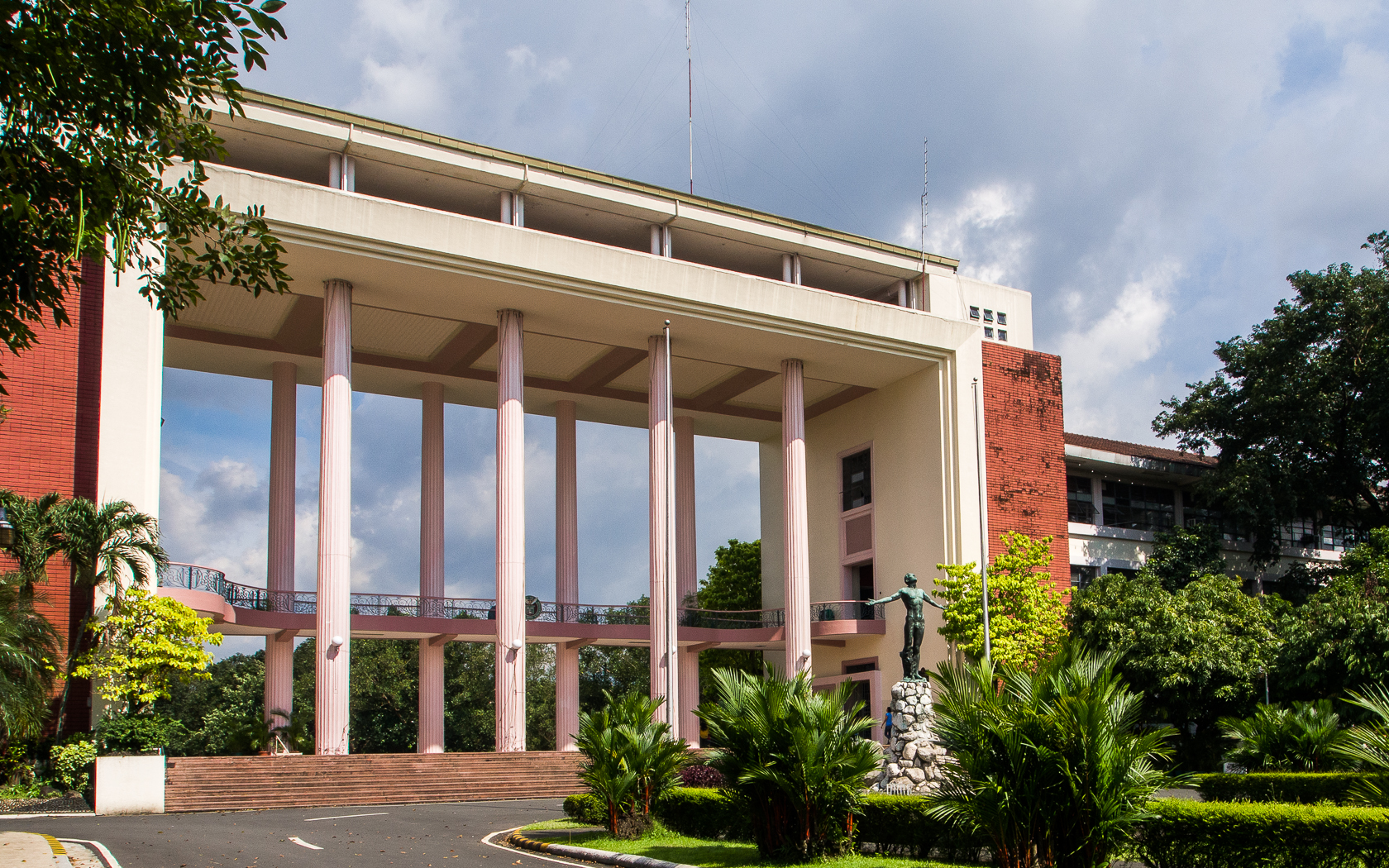
University of the Philippines Diliman in Quezon City, Philippines

There are more than 500 public higher education institutions in the Philippines that are controlled and managed by the Commission on Higher Education. Of the 500, 436 are state colleges and universities, 31 local colleges and universities, and a handful of community colleges. In 2008, the Philippine Congress passed Republic Act 9500, declaring the University of the Philippines as the national university to distinguish it from all other state universities and colleges. Other notable public colleges and universities include the Polytechnic University of the Philippines, Technological University of the Philippines, Philippine Normal University, Batangas State University, and Mindanao State University.

=== Singapore ===
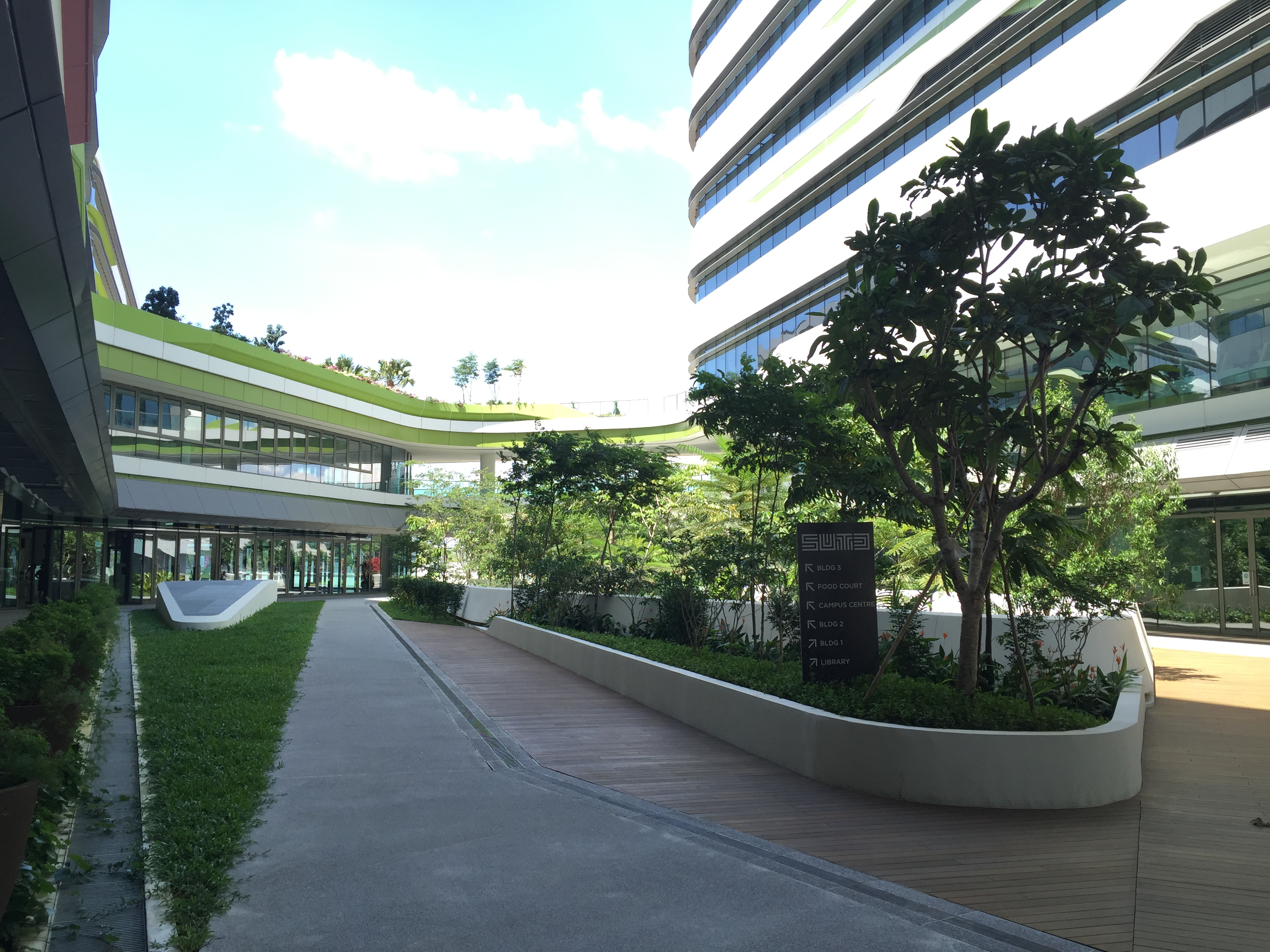
Singapore University of Technology and Design in Singapore

There are six autonomous public universities in Singapore, including National University of Singapore founded in 1905, Nanyang Technological University founded 1981, Singapore Management University founded in 2000, Singapore University of Technology and Design and Singapore Institute of Technology founded in 2009, and Singapore University of Social Sciences founded in 2017.

=== Sri Lanka ===
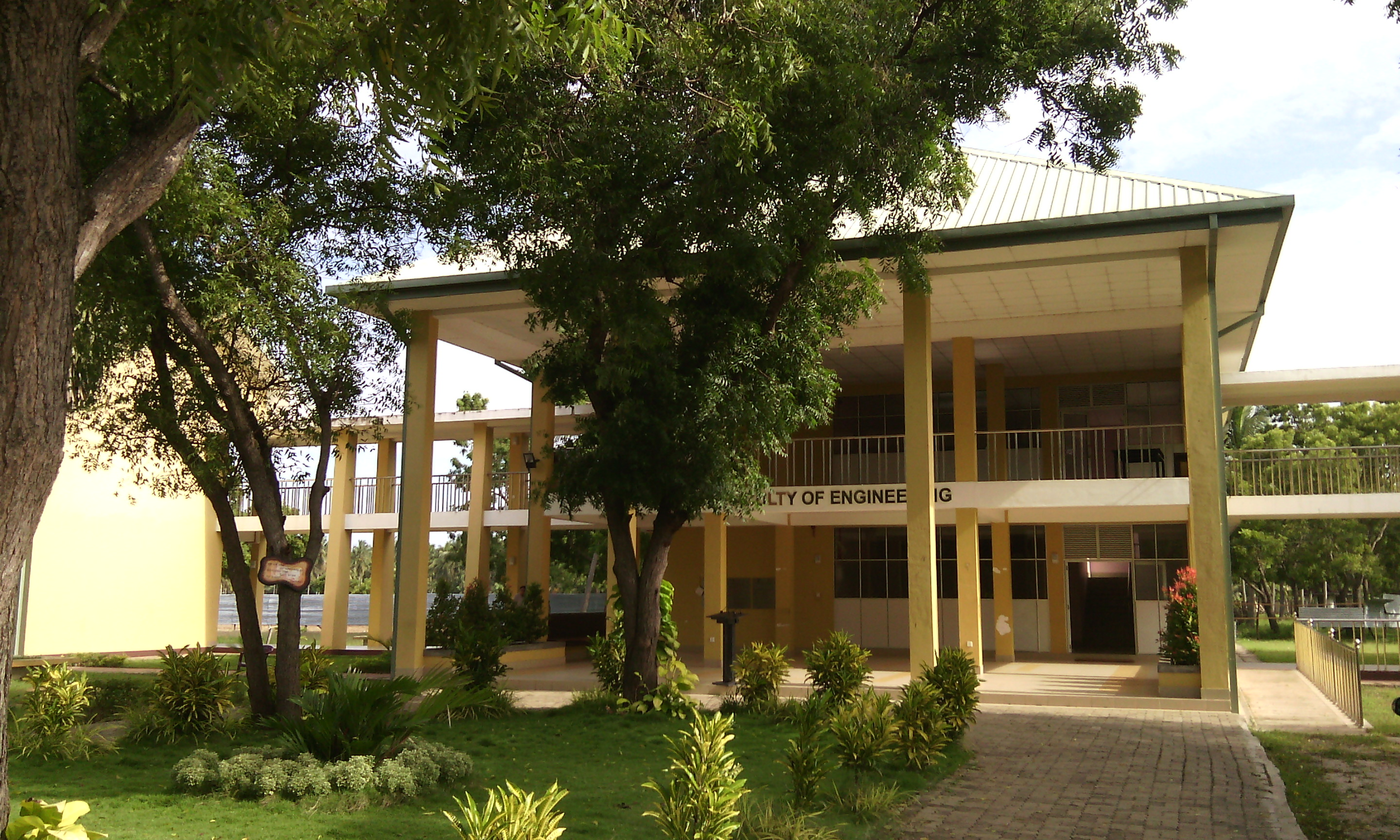
South Eastern University in Oluvil, Sri Lanka

In Sri Lanka, there are seventeen public universities. Most public universities are funded by the government through the University Grants Commission, which handles undergraduate placements and staff appointments. The top institutions include the University of Peradeniya founded in 1942 and the University of Colombo founded in 1921. Sri Lanka also has a joint service military university, the General Sir John Kotelawala Defence University, which is operated by the Ministry of Defence.

=== Taiwan ===
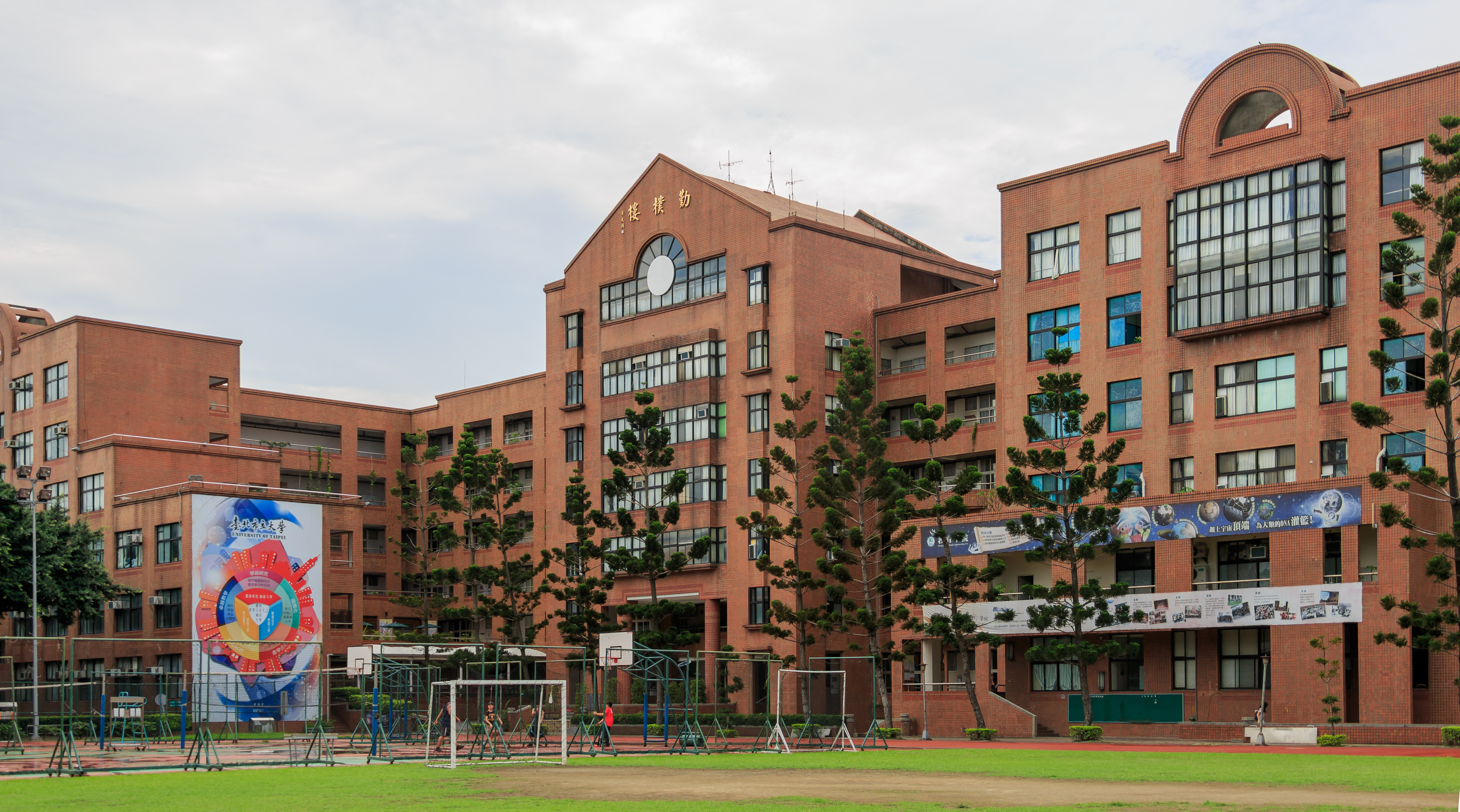
University of Taipei in Taipei, Taiwan

One-third of the 150 universities in Taiwan are public. Because the Taiwanese government provides funding to public universities, their students pay less than half the tuition fees of those at private universities. Ten public universities were established before the 1980s and are the most prestigious in Taiwan. As a result, most students choose public universities for their tertiary education.

=== Thailand ===
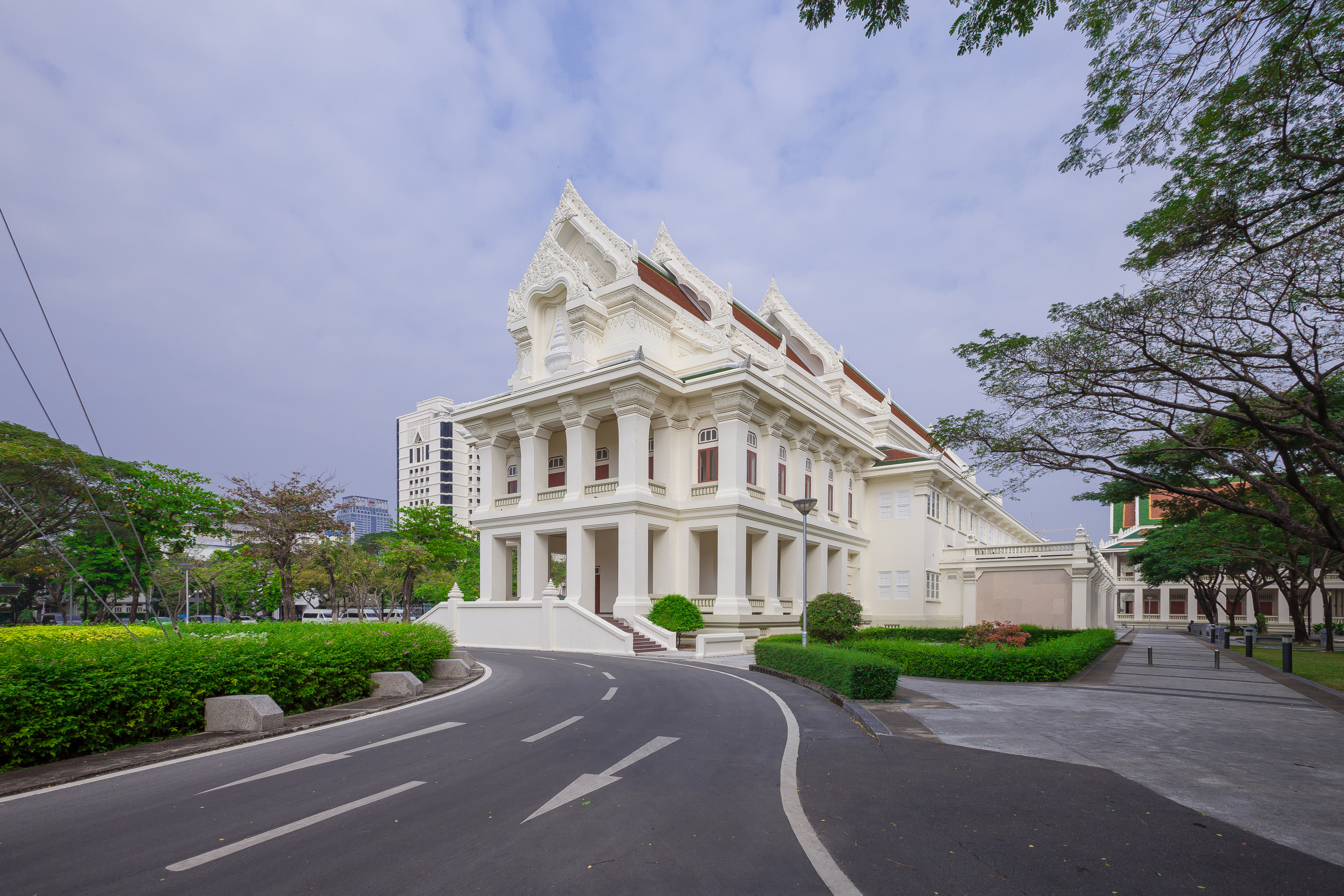
Chulalongkorn University in Bangkok, Thailand

In the late 19th century Thailand, there was a high demand for professional talent by the central government. In 1899, the King founded the School for Training of Civil Officials near the northern gate of the royal palace. Graduates from the school became royal pages, a traditional entrance into the Mahattai Ministry or other government ministries. As of 2019, Thailand has nineteen public universities.

== Europe ==
=== Austria ===
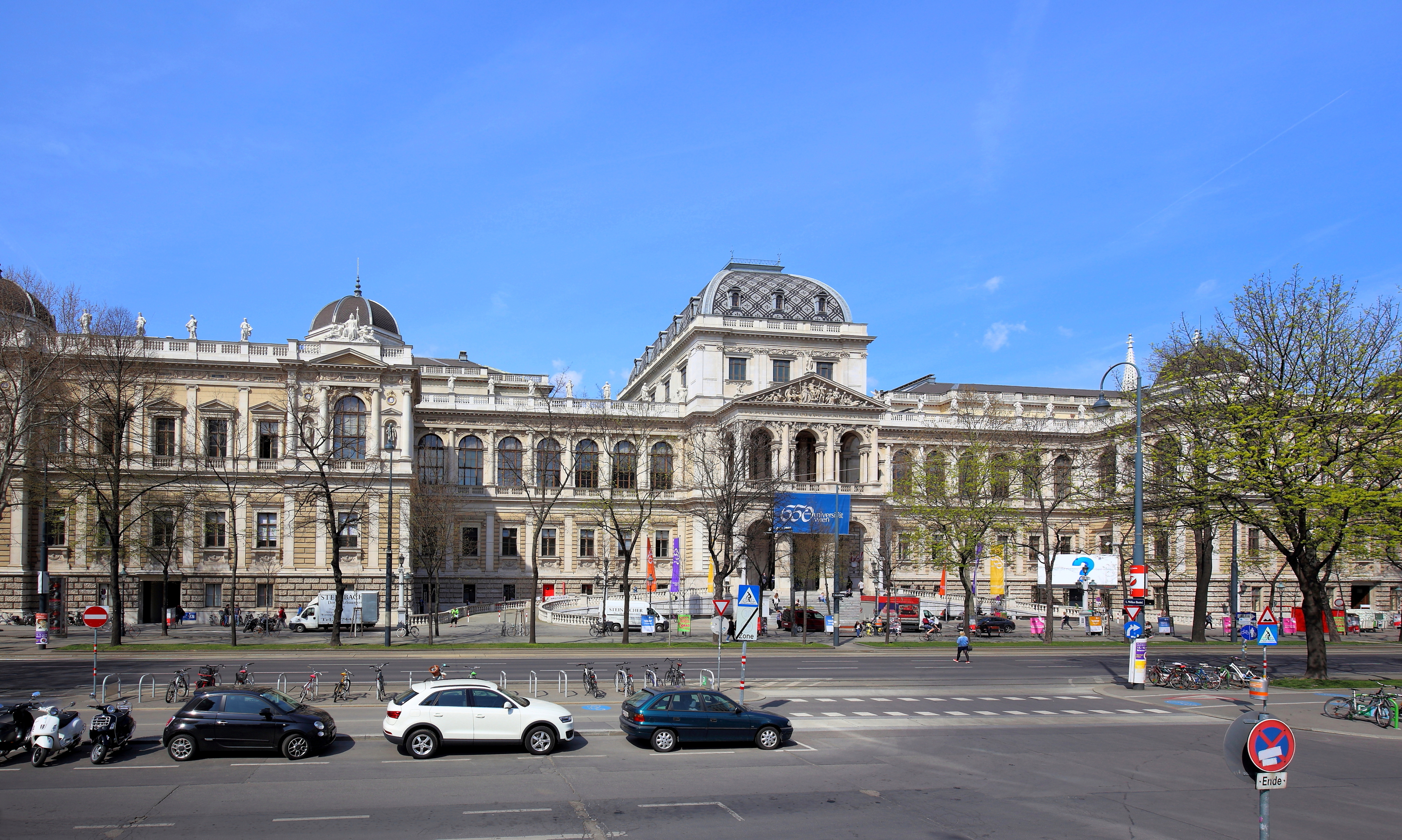
University of Vienna in Vienna, Austria

In Austria, most universities are public. The state regulates tuition fees, making costs the same for all public universities. Except for some fields of study, notably medicine, all Austrians who pass the Matura exam have the right to attend any public university. Overenrolled degree programs have introduced additional entrance exams that students must pass in the first year or before starting the degree, especially with scientific subjects such as biology, chemistry, and physics. Private universities have existed since 1999 but are considered easier than public universities and thus hold less esteem.

=== Belgium ===
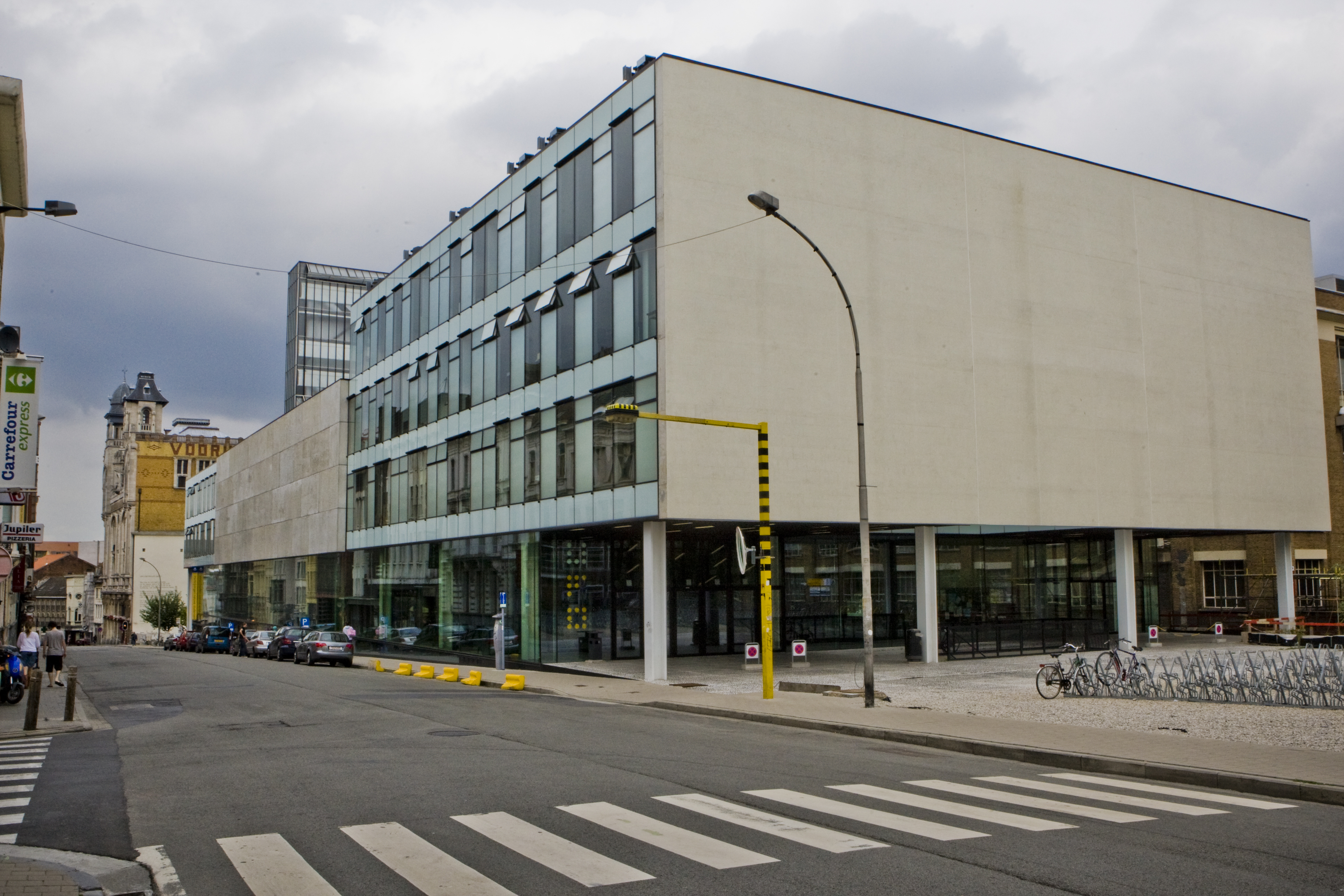
Ghent University in Ghent, Belgium

All public universities in Belgium were operated under the legislation of the national government until higher education was moved to the control of the three communities in 1990. Consequently, the Flemish, the French, and the German communities determine which institutes of higher education organize and issue diplomas.

Until the 1970s, Belgium had two state universities: the University of Liège (ULiège) and the Ghent University (UGent), both founded in 1817. These are often referred to as the two historic state universities. In 1965, small specialized single-faculty public institutions were recognized as universities, including the Faculty of Veterinary Medicine and the Gembloux Agro-Bio Tech; both are now part of the University of Liège.

The Belgian state created smaller public universities that have since merged with larger institutions, including the public university at Mons in 1965 which became part of the University of Mons in 2009. The state-created university founded in Antwerp in 1971 is now part of University of Antwerp. Hasselt University started as a state-created public institution managed by the Province of Limburg. Similarly, the Province of Luxembourg managed the state-created public university in Arlon which became part of ULiège in 2004.

Since 1891, private universities have gradually become state-recognized and funded. Some private, mostly Catholic, organizations are called free institutions, as in administratively free from the state despite being state-funded. As of 2022, the communities fund all recognized universities, public and private, which follow the same rules and laws.

=== Croatia ===
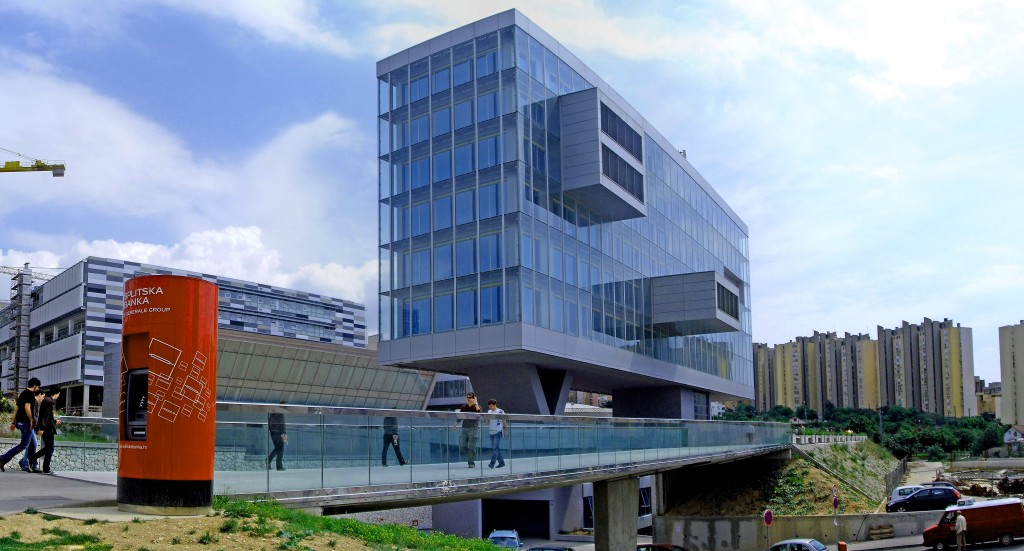
University of Split in Spilt, Croatia

The state runs most public universities in Croatia. Students who perform well academically pay only administrative fees which are less than €100 per year. Students who fail multiple classes in a year must retake the courses and pay a partial or full tuition fee.

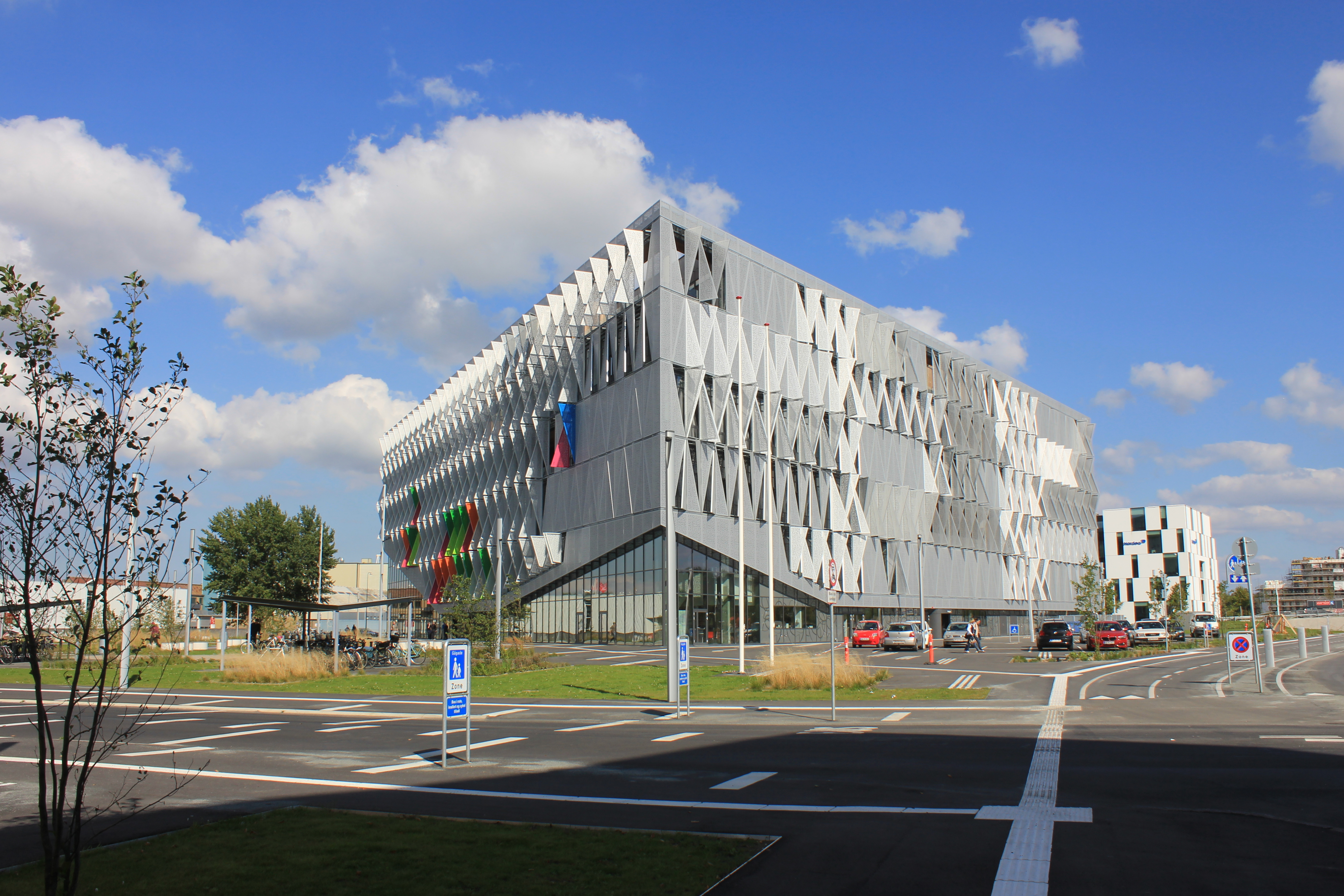
University of Southern Denmark in Kolding, Denmark

=== Denmark ===
Almost all universities in Denmark are public and are held in higher esteem than their private counterparts. Danish students attend university for free.

=== Finland ===
All universities in Finland are public and free of charge.

=== France ===
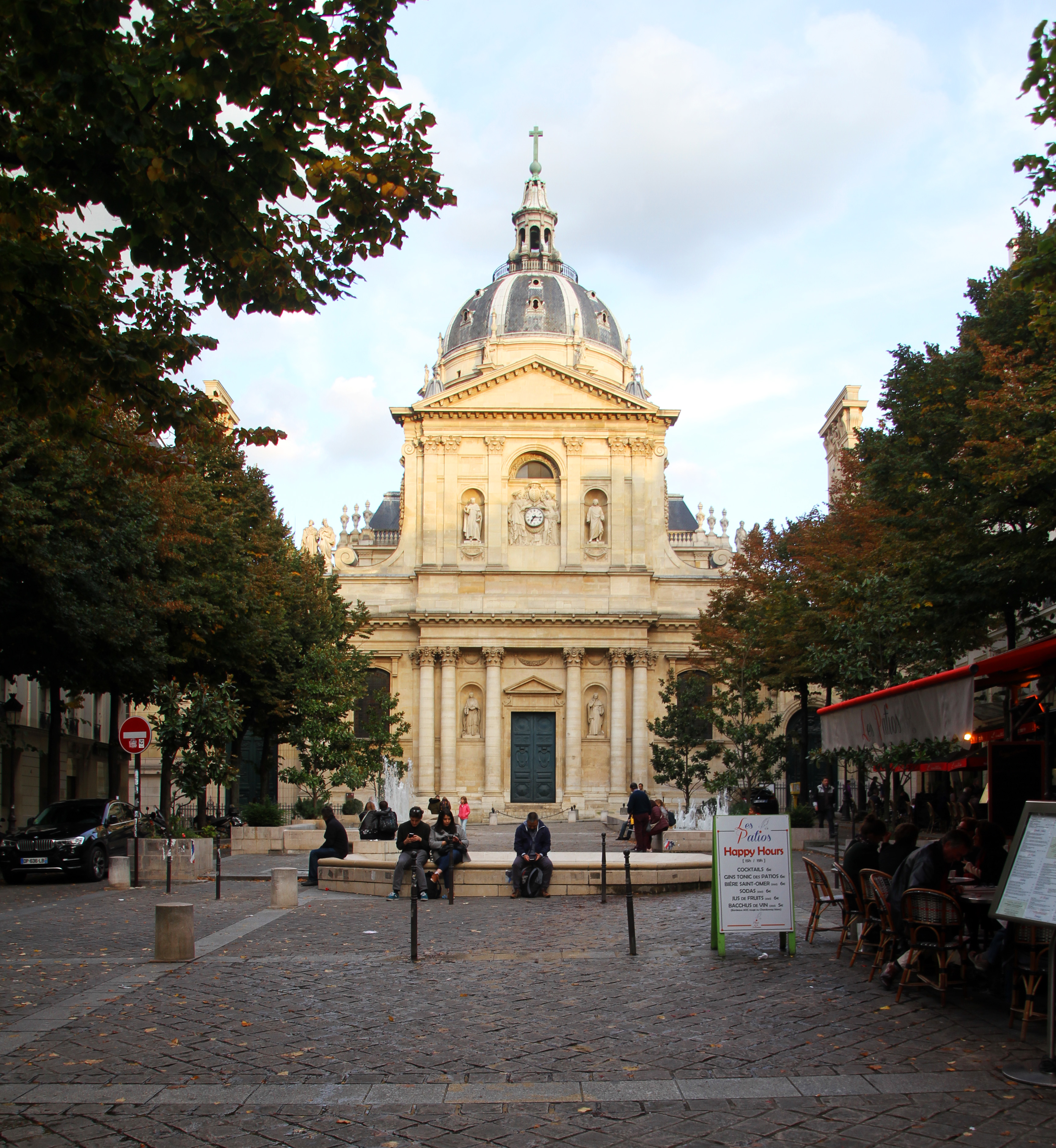
Sorbonne University in Paris, France

Most universities and grandes écoles in France are public and charge very low tuition fees—less than €1000 per year. Major exceptions are semi-private grandes écoles such as HEC, EMLyon or INSEAD.

Article L731-14 of the Code de l'éducation states that "private higher education establishments can in no case take the title of university." Nevertheless, many private institutions, such as the Catholic University of Lille or the Catholic University of Lyon, use the university as their marketing name.

=== Germany ===
Most higher education institutions in Germany are public and operated by the states. All professors are public servants. Public universities are generally held in higher esteem than their private counterparts. From 1972 through 1998, public universities were tuition-free; however, some states have since adopted low tuition fees.

=== Greece ===
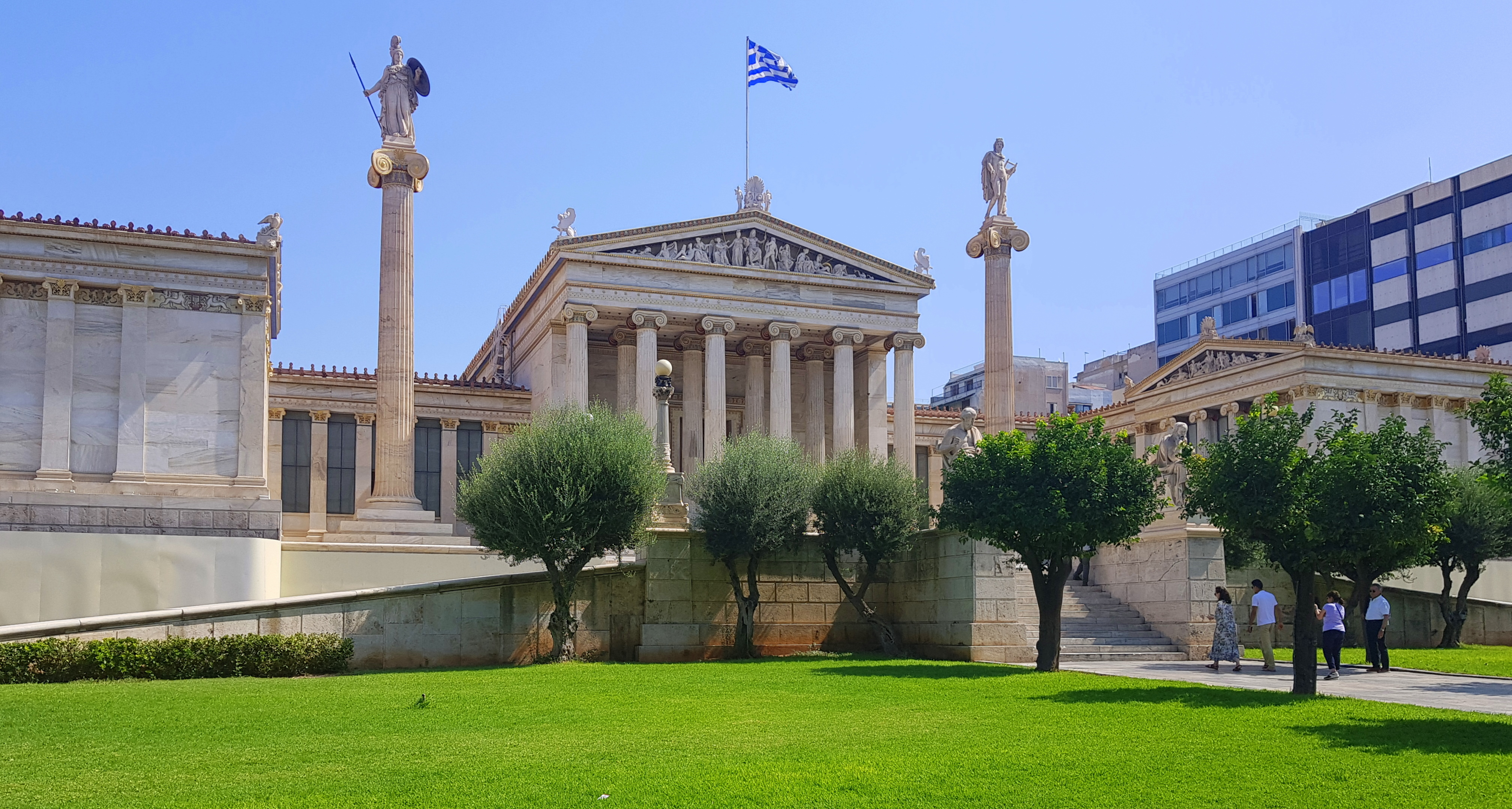
Academy of Athens in Athens, Greece

According to the constitution of Greece, higher education institutions (HEI) include universities, technical universities, and specialist institutions. HEI undergraduate programs are government-funded and do not charge tuition. A quarter of HEI postgraduate programs are tuition-free. After individual assessments, thirty percent of Greek students are entitled to attend any of the statutory postgraduate programs without tuition fees. Founded as a national institution in 1926, the Academy of Athens is the highest research establishment in Greece.

Private higher education institutions could not operate in Greece and were not recognized as degree-awarding bodies by the Greek government until the law 5094/2024 was passed in 2024, permitting the establishment and operation of private Higher Education Institutions (HEIs). Such HEIs are yet to be accredited and established.

=== Ireland ===
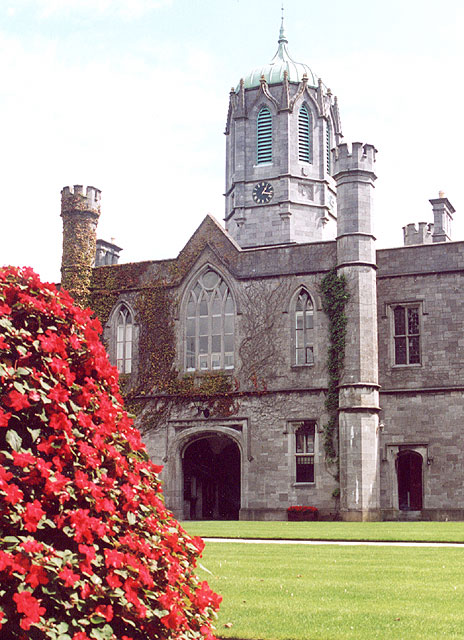
University of Galway in Galway, Ireland

In Ireland, most universities and technological universities are publicly funded but institutionally autonomous rather than directly state-owned. Higher education is provided by universities, technological universities, institutes of technology, colleges of education and specialist institutions. The Higher Education Authority is the statutory agency responsible for allocating exchequer funding to universities, institutes of technology and other higher education institutions.

Under the Free Fees Initiative, the state pays undergraduate tuition fees for eligible students, while students are required to pay a student contribution charge. For the 2025/26 academic year, the student contribution charge is €2,500 per year.

Independent and private higher education institutions also operate in Ireland. The Royal College of Surgeons in Ireland was authorised to use the title "university" in Ireland in 2019, becoming RCSI University of Medicine and Health Sciences; it describes itself as an independent, not-for-profit university.

=== Italy ===
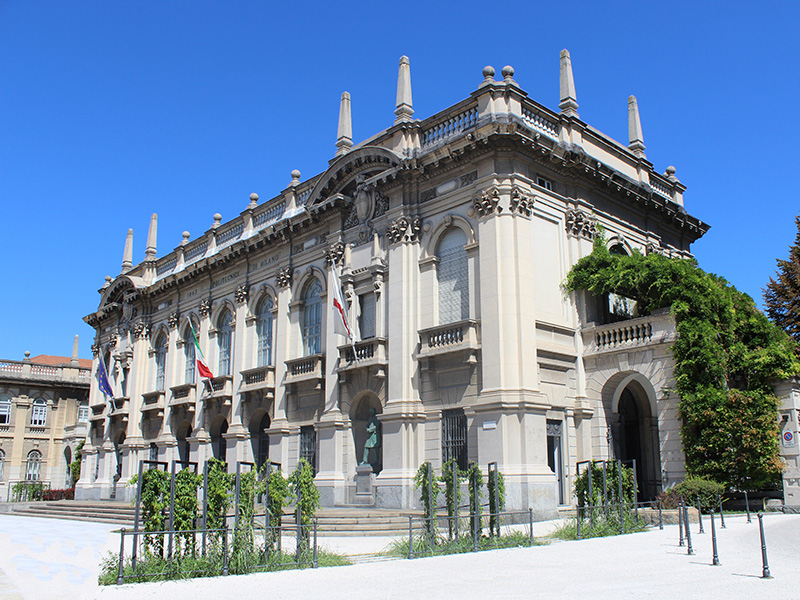
Polytechnic University of Milan in Milan, Italy

Almost all universities in Italy are public but have institutional autonomy by law. The Italian state provides the majority of university funding. Therefore, students pay relatively low tuition fees, set by each university according to the student's family wealth, the course of study, and exam performance. A few scholarships are available for the best low-income students at the undergraduate and postgraduate levels. However, for research, private funding ranges from low to non-existent, compared to most European countries.

=== Netherlands ===
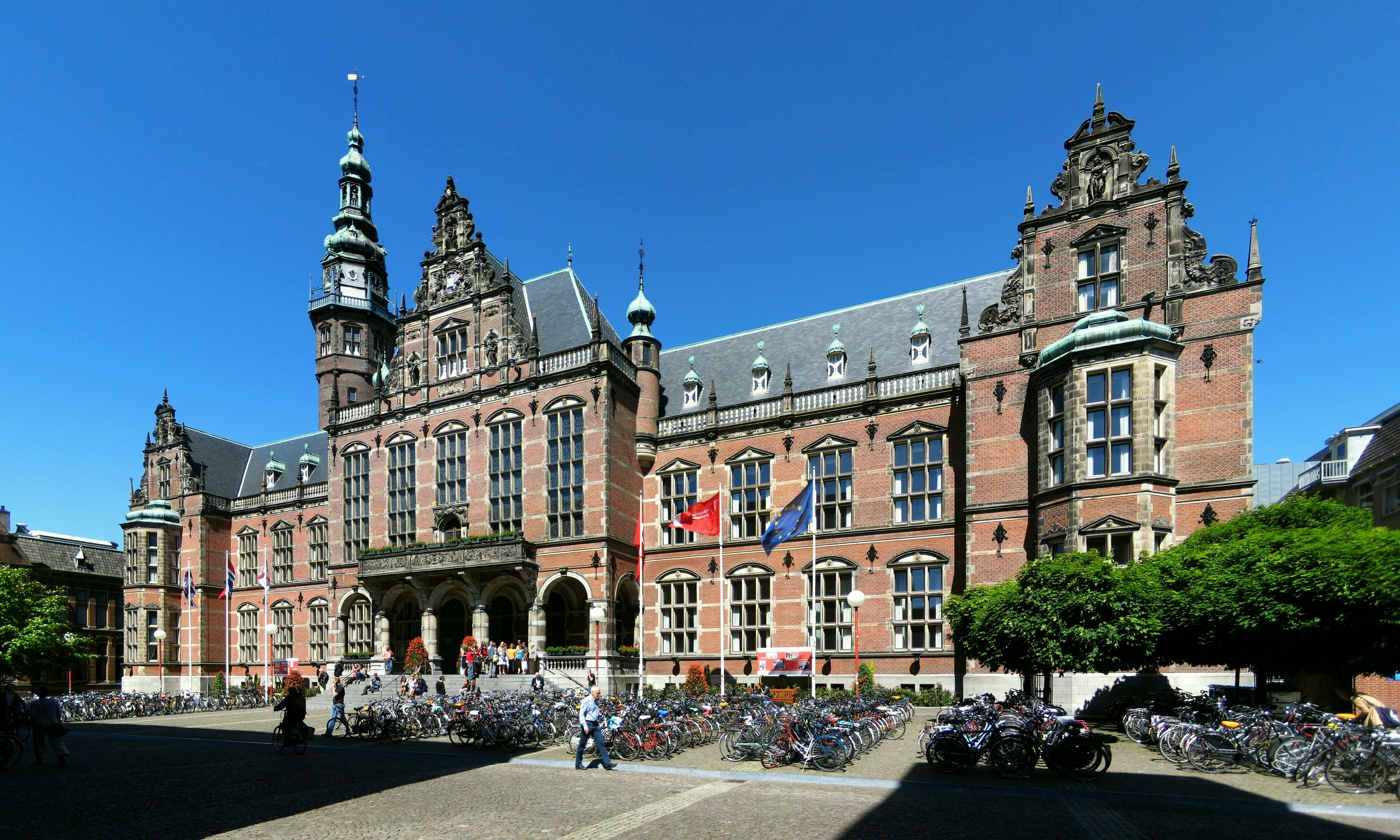
University of Groningen in Groningen, Netherlands

The Netherlands Ministry of Education funds most public universities. Dutch citizens and those from European Union countries pay an annual tuition fee for their first bachelor's or master's degree; the fee was €1,951 in 2015. Non-European Union students and students who want to complete a second bachelor's or master's degree pay a legal school fee. Annually, these legal school fees range between €7,000 for bachelor programs and €30,000 for master's programs in medicine. The Ministry of Education supervises all universities, including private institutions.

=== Norway ===
Most of the universities in Norway are public and state-funded.

=== Poland ===
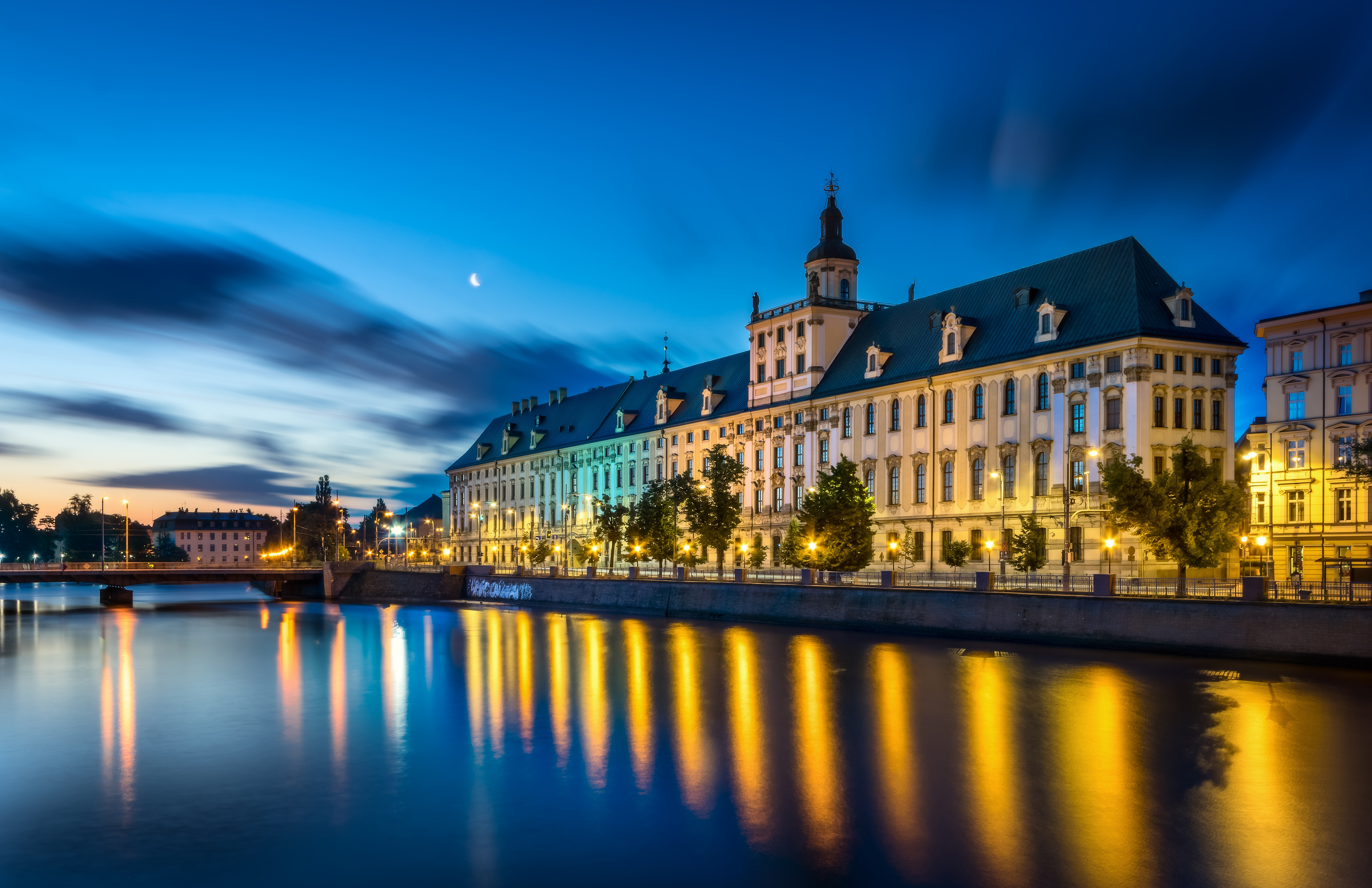
University of Wrocław in Wrocław, Poland

In Poland, public universities are established by Acts of Parliament. The government pays all tuition fees and other costs of public university students. In contrast, private citizens, societies, or companies operate private universities that charge tuition fees directly to students. These institutions are generally held in lower regard than public universities. A small number of private universities do not charge fees, such as John Paul II Catholic University of Lublin.

=== Portugal ===
University of Coimbra in Coimbra, Portugal

There are thirteen public universities, a university institute, and a distance university in Portugal. Higher education in Portugal provided by state-run institutions is not free; students must pay a tuition fee. However, the tuition fee is lower than that of private universities. The highest tuition fee allowed by law in public universities is €697 per year as of 2022. Public universities include some of the most selective and demanding higher learning institutions in Portugal.

=== Russia ===
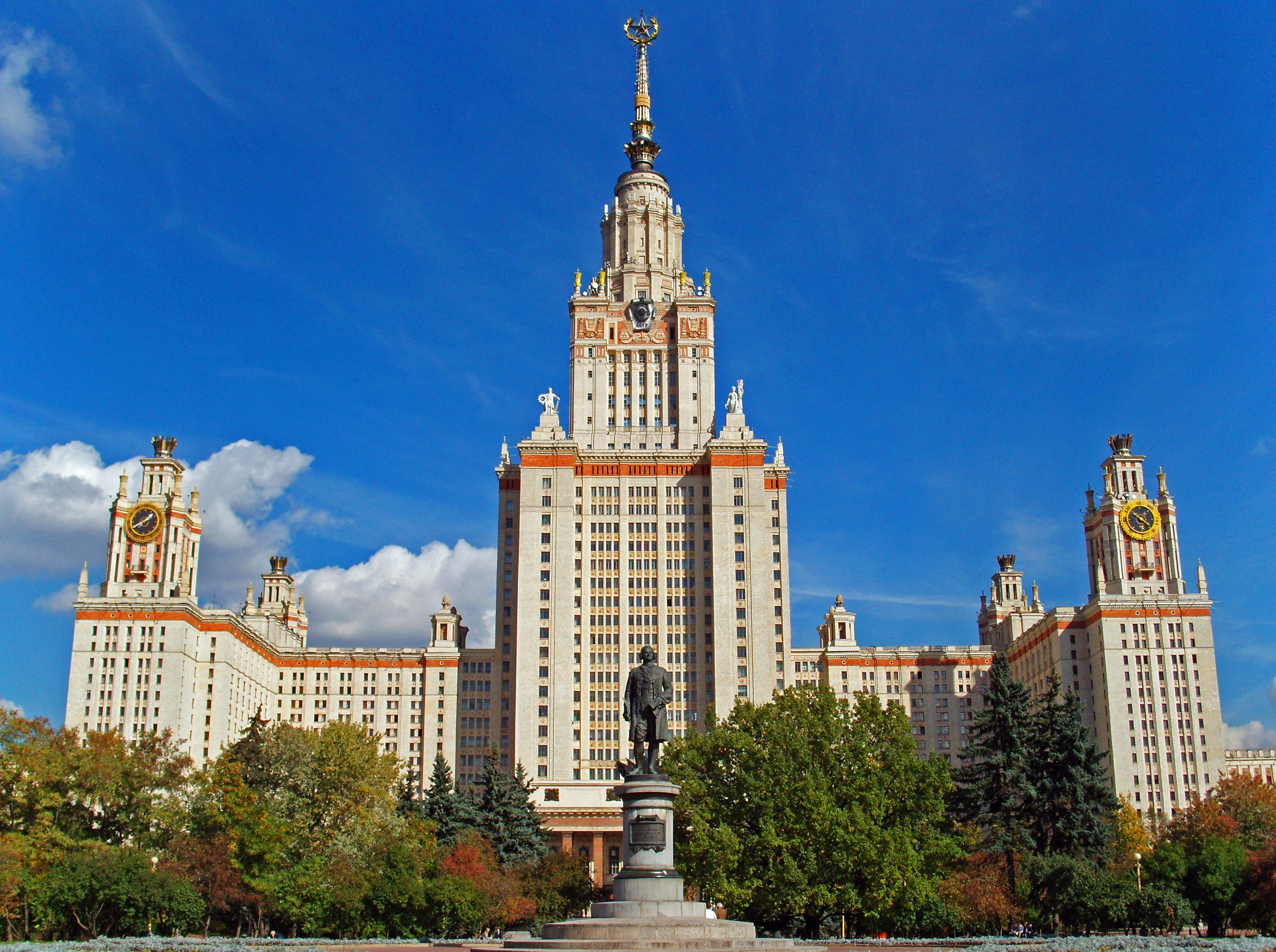
Moscow State University in Moscow, Russia

In Russia, about 7.5 million students study in thousands of universities. Founded in 1755, Moscow State University is a public research university and the most prestigious university in Russia. Saint Petersburg State University is a state-owned university that was founded in 1724; it is managed by the government of the Russian Federation.

=== Serbia ===
In Serbia, over 85% of college students study at state-operated public universities. Academically well-performing students pay only administrative fees of less than €100 per year. Students who fail multiple classes in a year and have to retake them, pay a partial or full tuition fee, ranging from €500 to €2000 per year. Private universities have existed in Serbia since 1989 but are held in less esteem because they are generally less academically rigorous than the public universities.

=== Spain ===
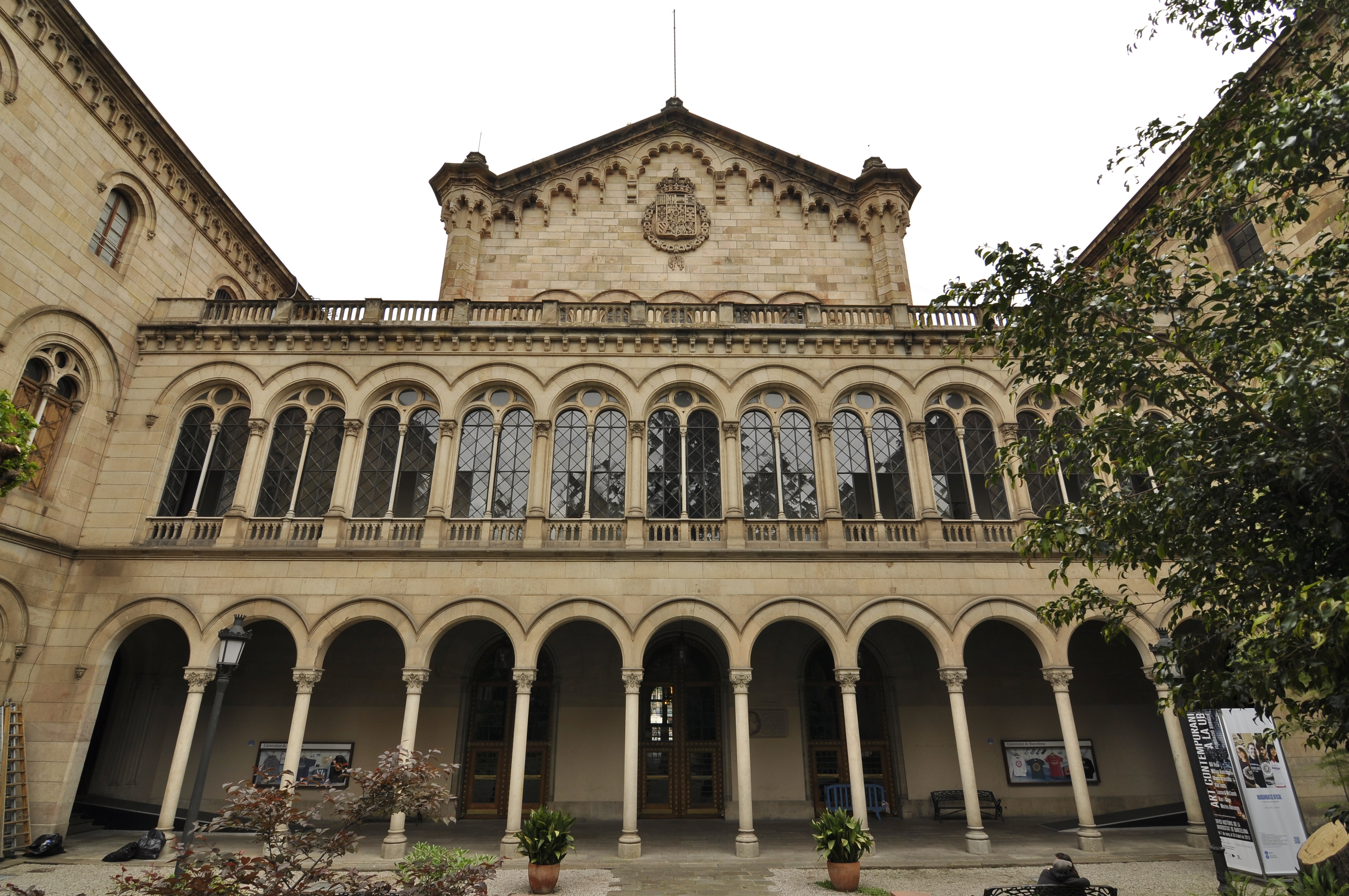
University of Barcelona in Barcelona, Spain

Of the 74 universities in Spain, 54 are public and funded by the autonomous community in which they are based. University funding differs by region. However, the central government establishes homogeneous tuition fees for all public universities which are much lower than those of their private counterparts. The highest tuition fee allowed by law was, as of 2010, €14.97 per academic credit, amounting to roughly €900 a year for an average 60-credit full-time course. Tuition fees at private universities might reach €18,000 a year.

Public universities are state-owned but are granted considerable independence and self-governance. However, public universities do not have free use of their assets and are subject to Spanish administrative law. Public university administrators, lecturers, and professors are granted civil servant status rather than tenure. A Spanish civil servant can only be fired under exceptional and well-justified circumstances. Research funding is allocated by the autonomous community or the central government; in the former, funding amount and conditions vary significantly from one independent community to another.

=== Sweden ===
Most universities in Sweden are public. Education in Sweden is free, so students do not pay tuition at any Swedish university.

=== Turkey ===
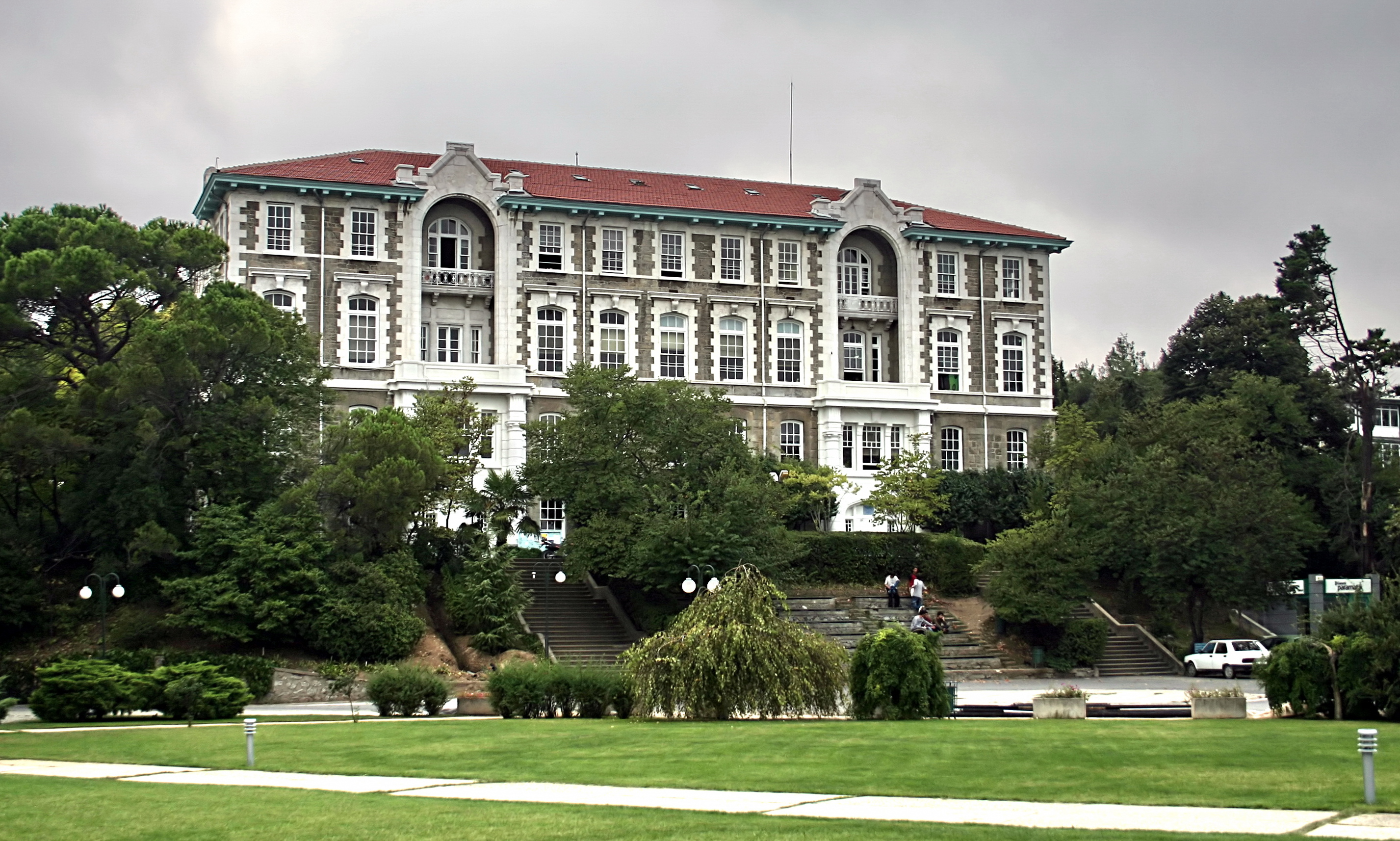
Boğaziçi University in Istanbul, Turkey

Turkey has 208 higher education institutions. These include 129 public universities, 11 technical universities, one institute of technology, and two fine arts universities. In addition, there are 75 private foundation universities and four private institutions that offer only two-year degrees. Specialized institutions include the National Defence University and the Police Academy. The higher education system is regulated by the Council of Higher Education.

=== Ukraine ===
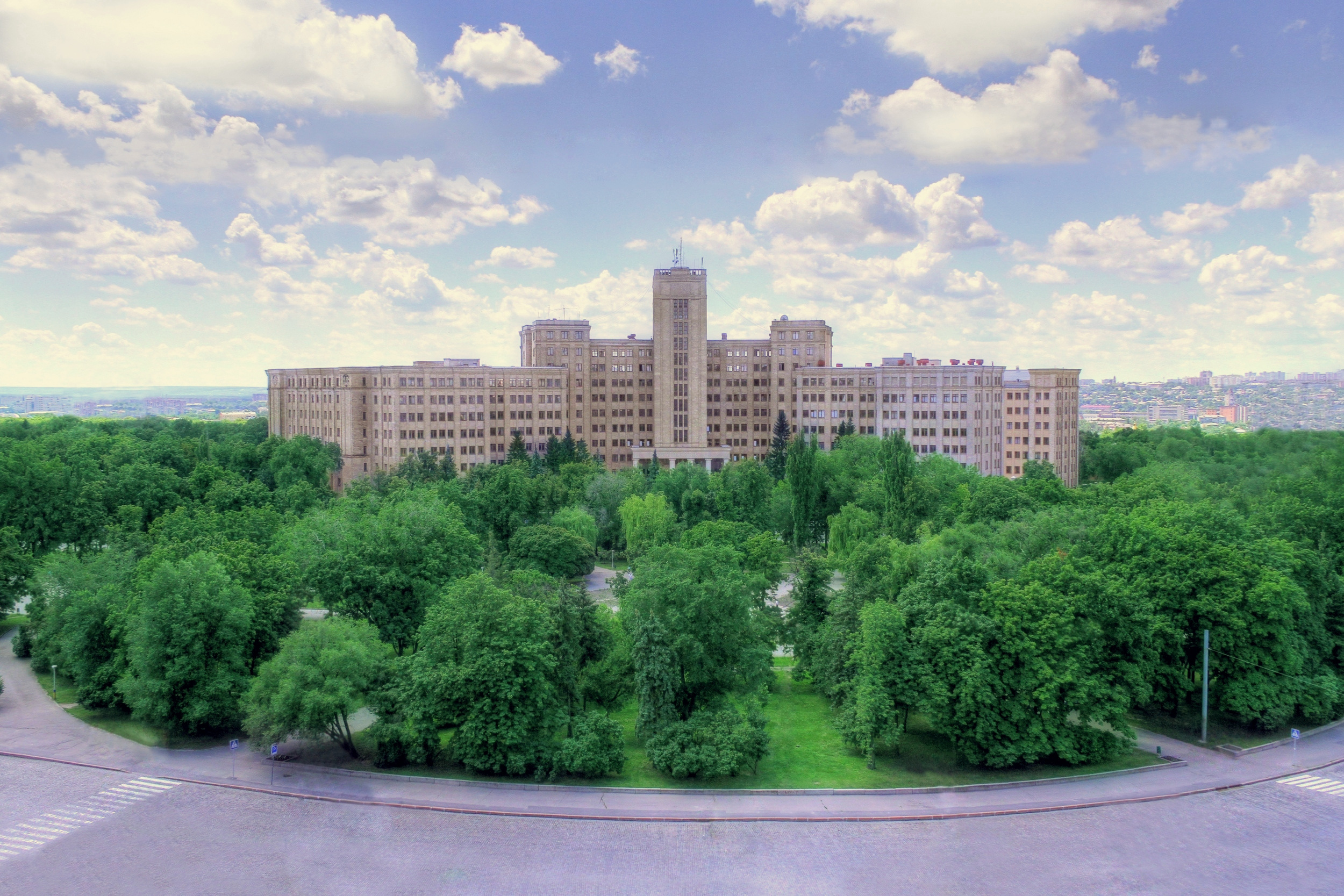
Constructivist House of Projects, National University of Kharkiv

After the collapse of the Soviet Union, there were 910 higher educational institutions on the territory of Ukraine, and over the years there has been a tendency to reduce their number. Despite the decline of universities, the number of university students increased from 881,000 in 1990/1991 to 2.4 million in 2007/2008. Taras Shevchenko National University of Kyiv, founded in 1834 and located in Kyiv, is one of the most prestigious universities in Ukraine. National University of Kharkiv was founded in 1804 in Kharkiv and since then has become one of the largest universities in Eastern Europe.

=== United Kingdom ===
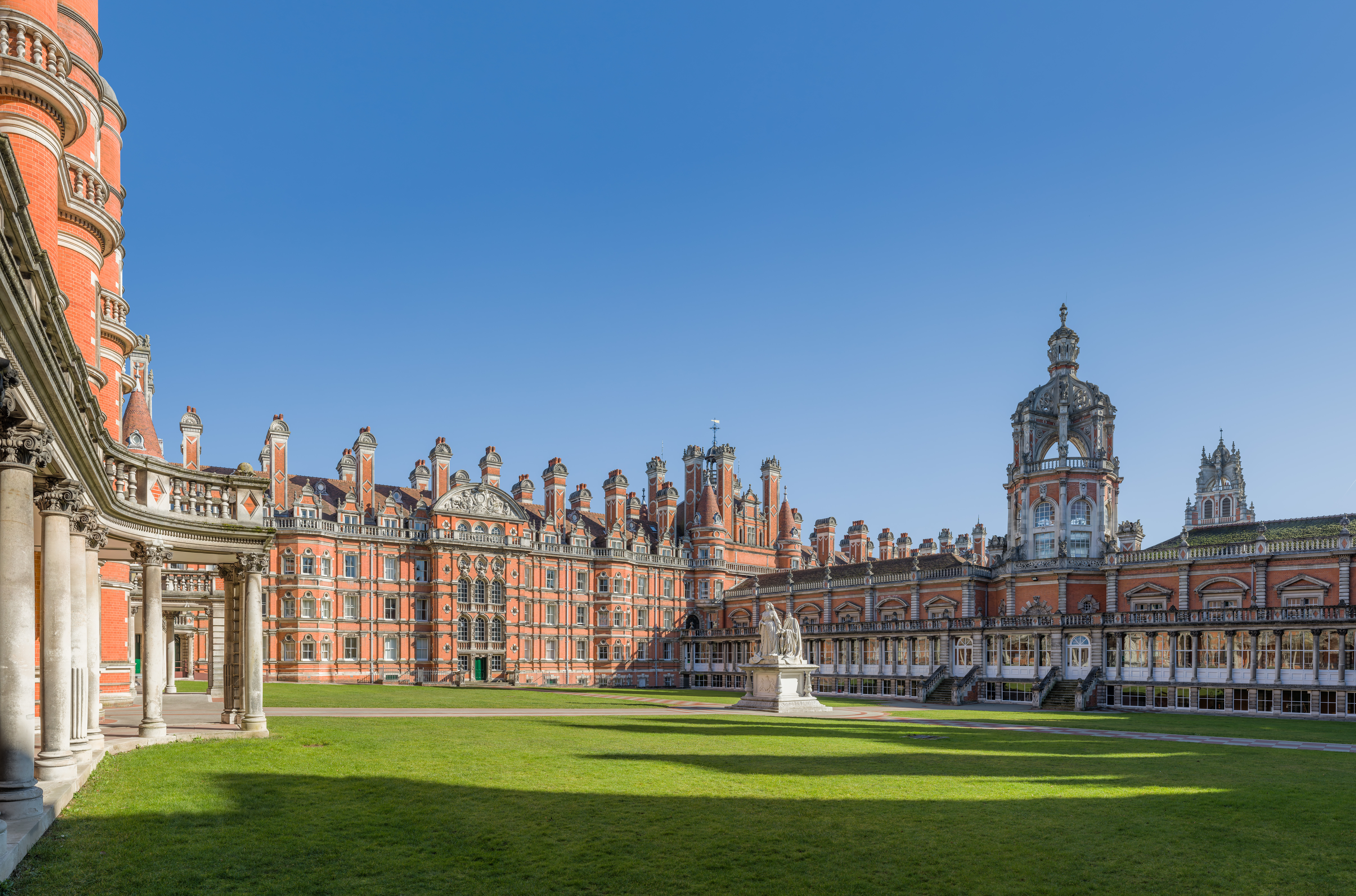
Royal Holloway, University of London in Surrey, England

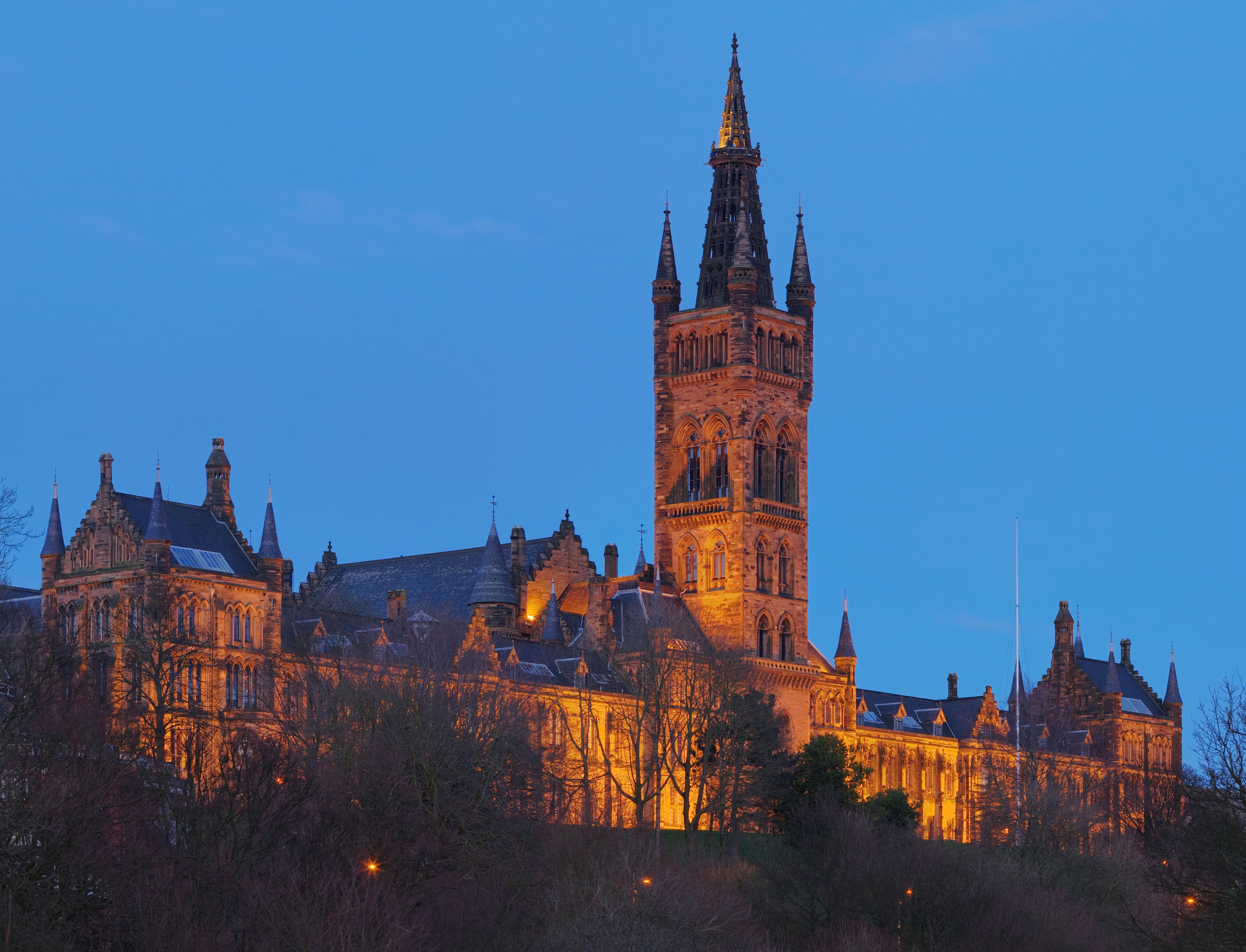
The University of Glasgow founded in 1451 (Glasgow, Scotland)

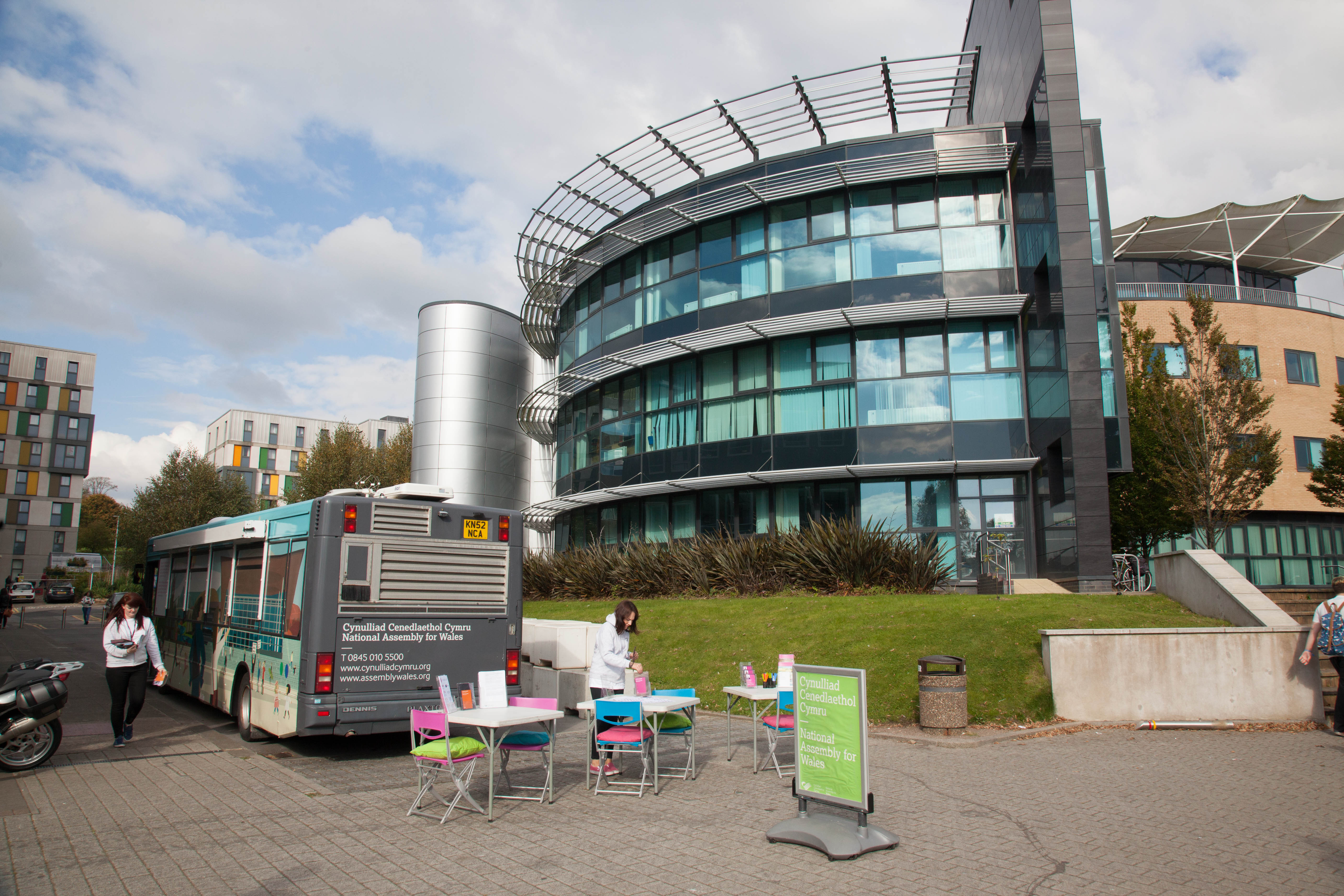
Swansea University in Swansea, Wales

In the United Kingdom, the government does not own universities and they are not considered part of the public sector for accounting purposes. However, universities are considered public bodies if they receive funding for teaching or research from one of the funding councils.

The right to award degrees and use the title university or university college is granted by the Privy Council for institutions in Scotland, Wales, and Northern Ireland and by the Office for Students for institutions in England. All universities are autonomous and legally independent of the state, but are still regulated by the government. The degree of regulation varies between the countries and depends on the university's constitutional form and whether it receives public funding. Most universities in the United Kingdom receive public funding through block grants from the Office for Students (England), the Higher Education Funding Council for Wales, the Department for the Economy (Northern Ireland), or the Scottish Funding Council. There are only six fully-fledged private universities in the United Kingdom that do not receive block grants, all in England.

Universities and other higher education providers that receive block grants are treated as public authorities under the Equality Act 2010 and the Freedom of Information Act 2000 (the Freedom of Information (Scotland) Act 2002 for institutions in Scotland). They are also likely to be considered a public authority under the Human Rights Act 1998. Universities incorporated as higher education corporations are regarded as public authorities for some purposes, even if they do not receive public funding.

If a university in England receives public funding, the government regulates the tuition fees the university can charge. (Note: In principle, any university can leave the regulated fees system at any time by not accepting public funding; for most universities (those not incorporated as higher education corporations), this would also remove their status as public authorities. In "OFFA and £6000–9000 tuition fees", OxCHEPS Occasional Paper No. 39 (February 21, 2011), Farrington Dennis and David Palfreyman write, "...any university which does not want funding from HEFCE can, as a private corporation, charge whatever tuition fees it likes (exactly as does, say, the University of Buckingham or BPP University College). Under existing legislation and outside of the influence of the HEFCE-funding mechanism upon universities, the Government can no more control university tuition fees than it can dictate the price of socks in Marks & Spencer. Universities are not part of the State. They are not part of the public sector; Government has no reserve powers of intervention even in a failing institution.) In addition, registration as a higher education provider is obligatory for English universities, whether or not they are publicly funded, and requires adherence to public interest governance principles. All registered providers in England must also be members of the Office of the Independent Adjudicator.

However, direct government funding for universities has declined since 2012. Between 2014 and 2018, funding council grants dropped from 18% to 15% for University College London (a large research university), 17% to 11% for Durham University (a small research university), and 15% to 8% for the University of Hertfordshire (a teaching-focused university).

Each of the four nations within the United Kingdom is responsible for higher education as a devolved matter and have adopted different methods of support for resident students. Scotland offers free tuition for residents for their first undergraduate degree in Scotland. (Note: Scotland may also pay for a fifth year of undergraduate study if a student needs to repeat a year or decides to change their course of study. This is known as false-start funding.) The Welsh Government provides means-tests grants and loans to students, based on family income; the funding follows Welsh students, even if they choose to study outside of Wales. England and Northern Ireland expect students to take out student loans to cover the cost of tuition.

The University of London was government controlled from its establishment as an examining board in 1836 to its reconstitution as a more traditional teaching university in 1900. It has been described as "what today would be called a quango", operating out of government premises, staffed by civil servants, and directly accountable to the Treasury for its expenditure.

Until 2019, the governing documents of publicly funded universities could only be modified with permission from the Privy Council. For the majority of publicly funded universities in England, the Higher Education and Research Act 2017 replaced Privy Council oversight with public interest governance regulations from the Office for Students. (Note: these are applicable, in slightly different forms, to both public and private institutions) However, Privy Council oversight continues for almost all English institutions that were in the university sector before 1992, and would continue even if they were to cease to be publicly funded, due to their constitutional form as civil corporations, (Note: the University of Oxford and the University of Cambridge) statutory corporations, (Note: Durham University, the University of London, Newcastle University, and Royal Holloway) or as chartered corporations. (Note: All other institutions in the university sector before 1992, except for the London School of Economics, which is constituted as a company limited by guarantee)

== North America ==
=== Canada ===
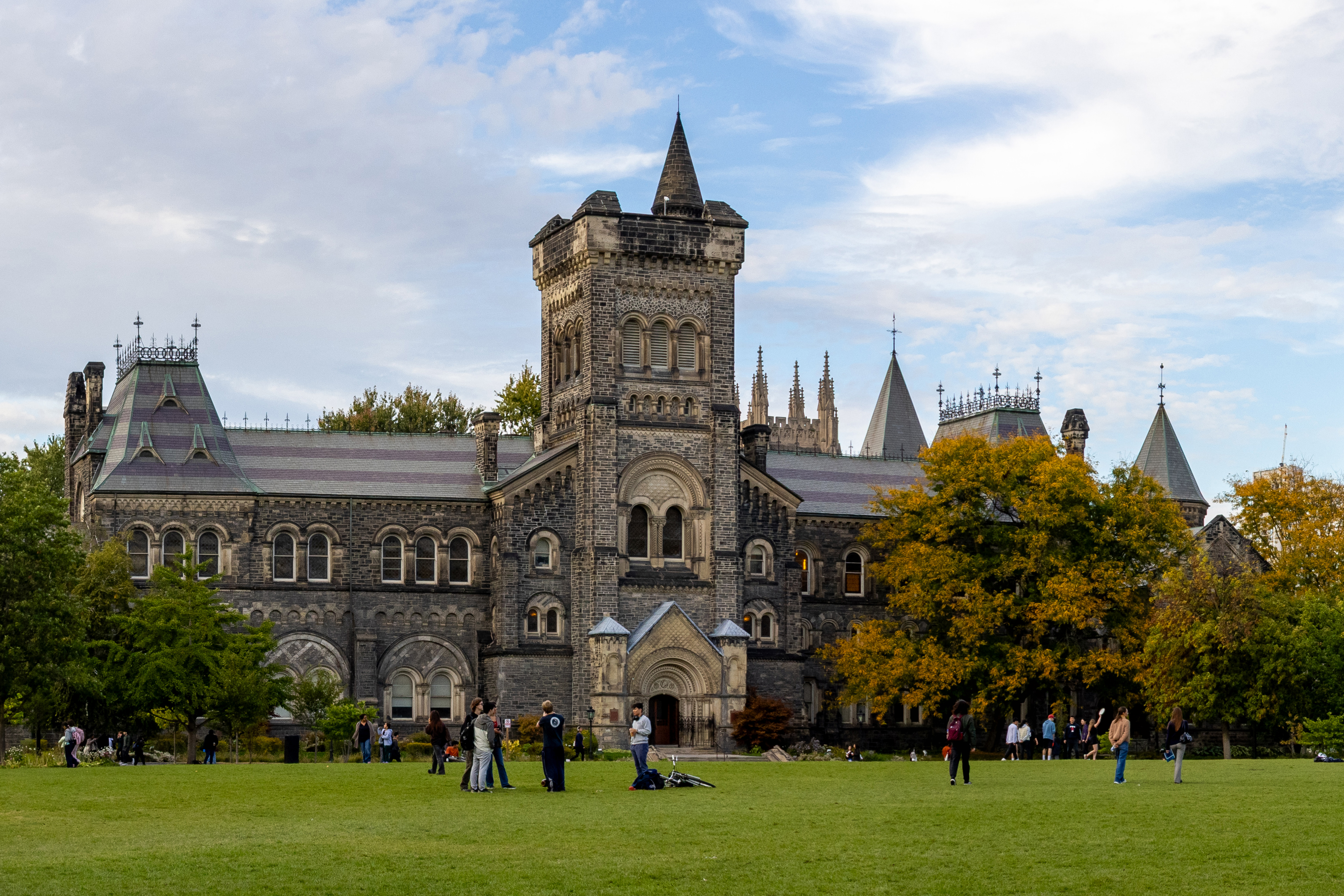
The University of Toronto in Ontario, Canada

In Canada, education is a constitutional responsibility of the individual provinces. Provincial governments established the University of Toronto on the Oxbridge model and the University of Alberta and University of Manitoba in the pattern of American state universities.

Many older universities in Canada were privately endowed such as McGill University or founded by church denominations, such as Mount Allison University (United Church), Université Laval (Catholic), St Mary's University (Catholic), Queen's University at Kingston (Presbyterian), Dalhousie University (Nonsectarian), St. Francis Xavier University (Catholic), McMaster University (Baptist), and the University of Ottawa (Catholic); these became publicly funded and secular in the 20th century. All major Canadian universities are now publicly funded but maintain institutional autonomy, with the ability to decide admission, tuition, and governance.

=== Costa Rica ===
In Costa Rica, public universities include the University of Costa Rica, the National University, the Distance State University, National Technical University and the Costa Rica Institute of Technology.

=== Mexico ===
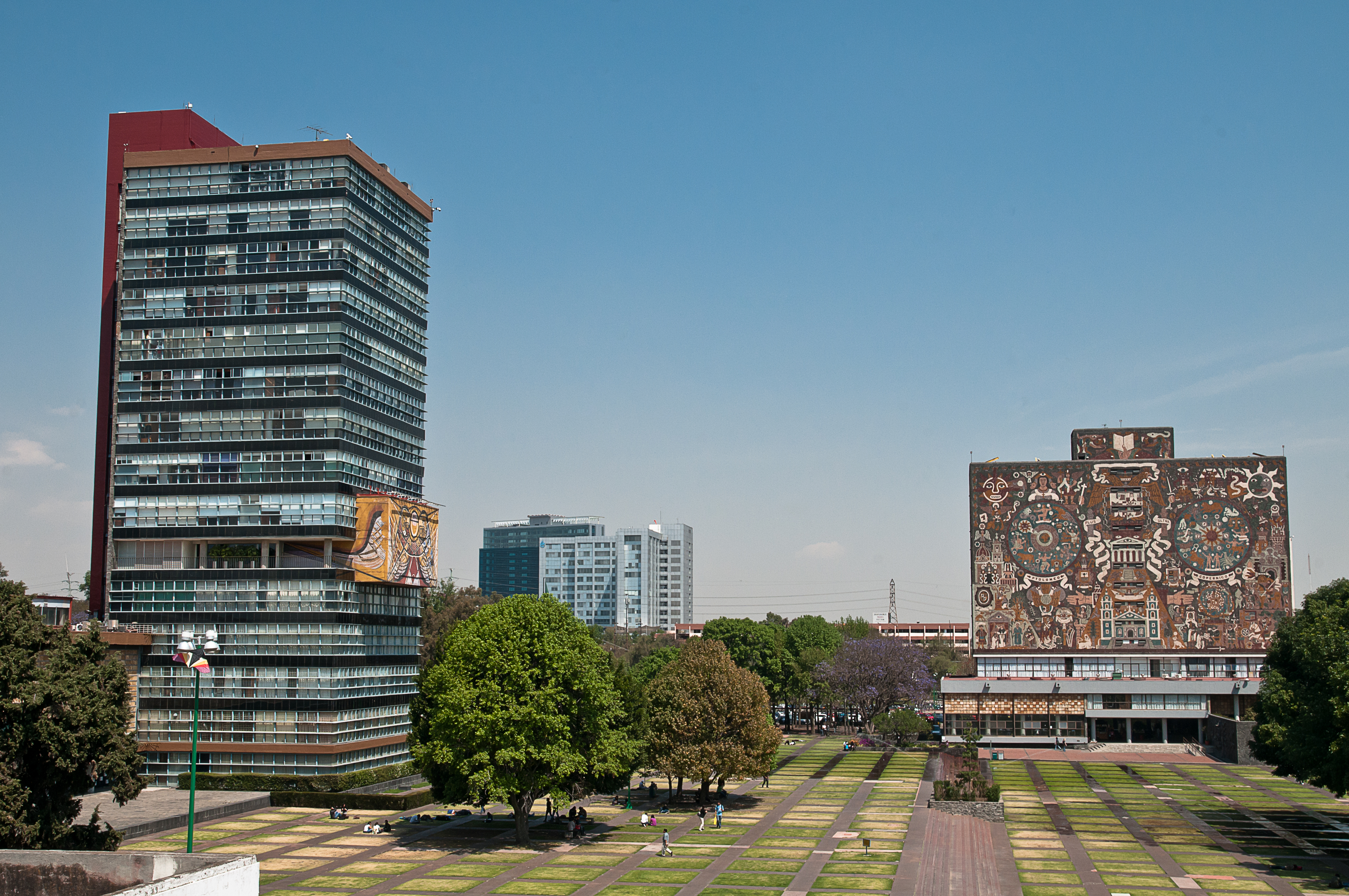
National Autonomous University of Mexico in Mexico City, Mexico

Mexico has both public and private universities, with wide variation in terms of cost, academic performance, and organization. The most reputable and largest university, the National Autonomous University of Mexico (UNAM), is publicly funded and virtually free, while also independent from the government. Instituto Politécnico Nacional is a federally-administered public university. Several public state universities follow an autonomous model similar to UNAM, including Universidad de Guadalajara and Universidad Autónoma de Nuevo León. However, these state universities do not receive as much public funding, which means higher tuition fees.

=== Panama ===
In Panama, there are five public universities, including the University of Panama and the Technological University of Panama. Public universities are state-funded with no cost or minimal tuition, around US$1,500 over four years. Public universities operate autonomously, without intervention from the state. Public universities are prestigious due to their free or low-cost nature, which removes financial incentives to pass and retain students.

=== United States ===
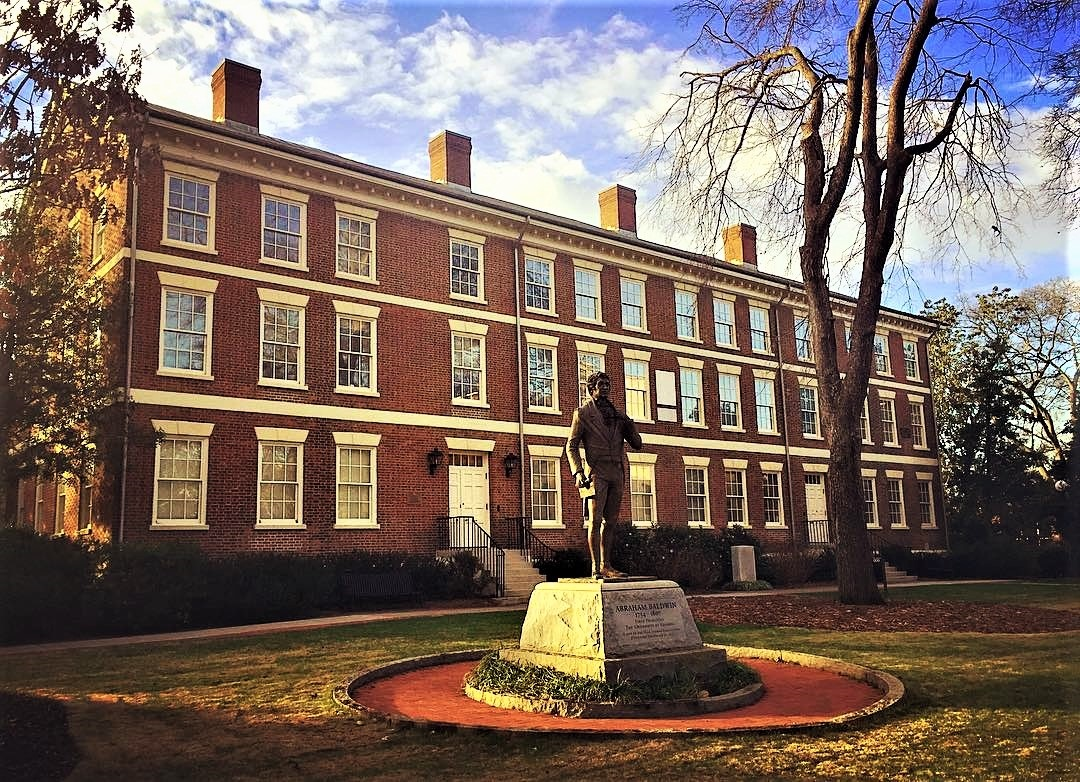
Old College at the University of Georgia in Athens, Georgia, United States

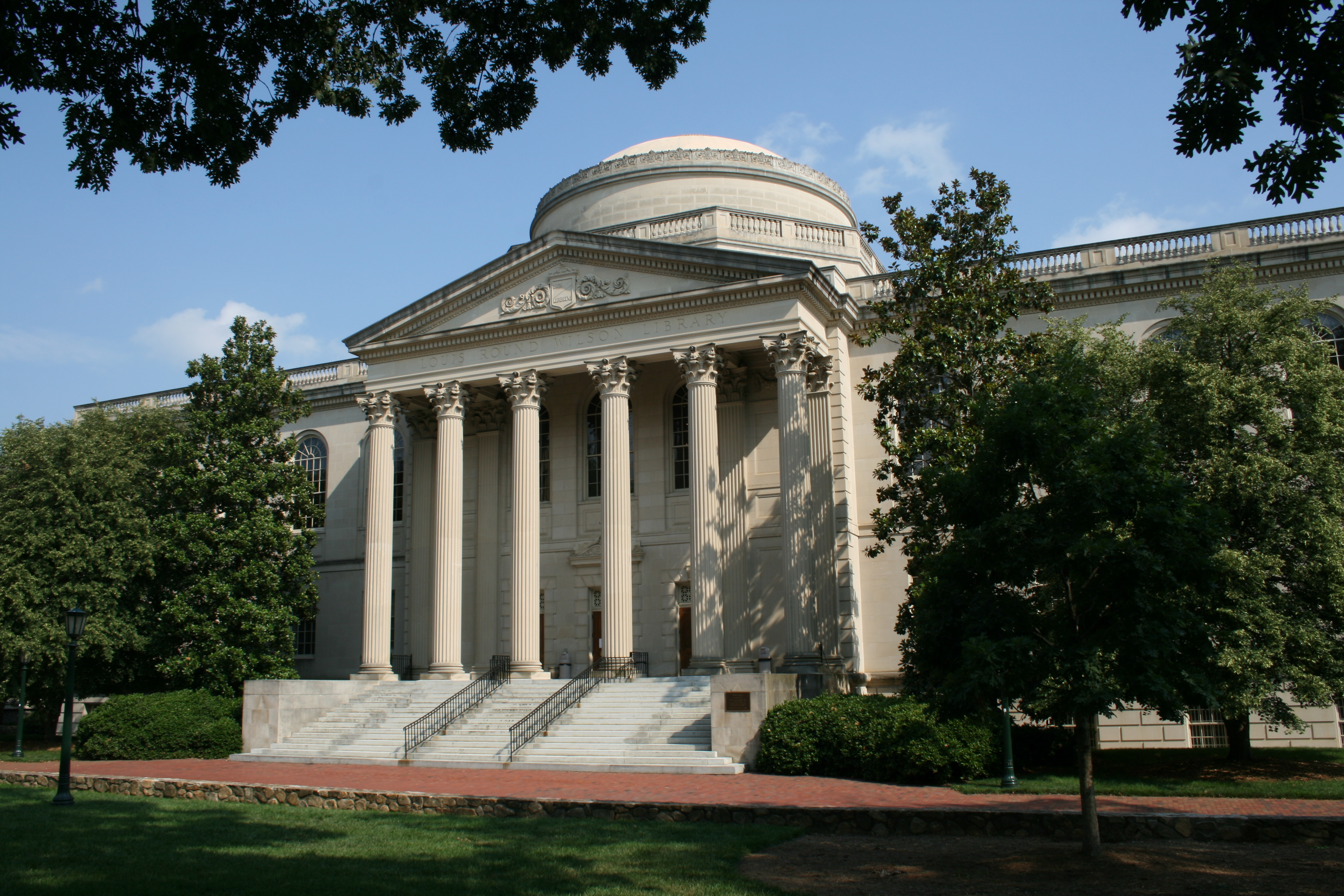
University of North Carolina in Chapel Hill, North Carolina, United States

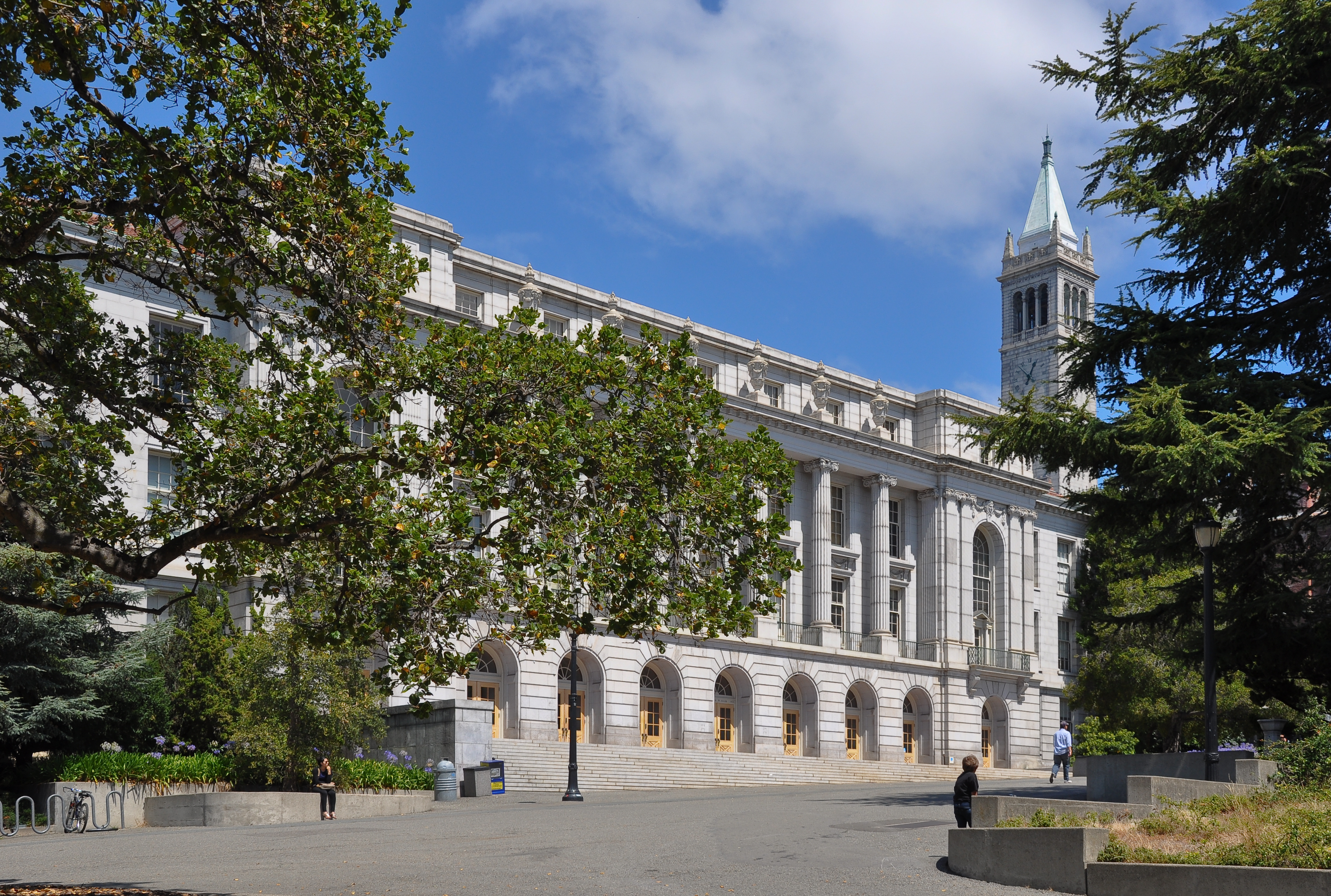
University of California, Berkeley in Berkeley, California, United States

In the United States, almost all public universities were founded, and are operated by state governments and rely on subsidies from their respective states. They often have large enrollments, extensive facilities, and large budgets. However, support for public universities has declined in recent decades, forcing many public universities to seek private donations or raise tuition and fees. The percentage of state appropriations at public universities has fallen from 78% in 1974 to 43% in 2000. States generally charge higher tuition to out-of-state students because in-state students or their parents have previously subsidized the university by paying state taxes.

The oldest public universities in the United States are the University of Georgia, founded in 1785, and the University of North Carolina at Chapel Hill, founded in 1789. (Note: Other universities also claim to be the oldest in the United States. The University of South Carolina, founded in 1801, is the longest continuously supported public university. Ohio University, founded in 1804, is the oldest public university in continuous operation. Vincennes University was founded in 1801 and has continuously operated. However, it did not become a public institution until 1806 and has been primarily a two-year institution since 1889. The University of Tennessee was chartered in 1794 but did not receive state funds until 1807 and closed from 1809 to 1820. William & Mary, North Carolina, Georgia, and South Carolina closed during the Civil War.) The College of William & Mary, founded in 1693, and Rutgers University, founded in 1766, were two of the nine colonial colleges. Both were private universities until the 20th century, with William & Mary becoming public in 1908 and Rutgers in 1945.

Every state has at least one public university and the largest states have more than thirty. This is partly a result of 1862 Morrill Land-Grant Acts, which gave eligible states 30,000 acres (12,141 ha) of federal land to sell to finance public universities that emphasized studies in agriculture and mechanical arts. (Note: Much of this land came from Native American tribal land.) The University of Wisconsin, Iowa State University, Rutgers, the State University of New Jersey, and the University of Missouri were early land-grant colleges. Targeted at the Southern states, the Agricultural College Act of 1890 required states to establish land-grant universities for African Americans if they were excluded from the state's existing land-grant institutions. The Civil Rights Act of 1964, the Higher Education Act of 1965, and the Education Amendments of 1972, made public universities even more accessible for women, minorities, and lower-income applicants.

A number of U.S. public universities began as teacher training institutions, often named normal schools or teachers colleges, and eventually expanded into comprehensive universities. Examples include the University of California, Los Angeles; Arizona State University; the University of Wisconsin–Milwaukee; and Missouri State University. There are also public tribal colleges and universities operated by Native Americans, and some colleges where a municipal government is an owner or part of governance such as the City University of New York and Quincy College. Federally chartered public universities include the United States service academies that are administered by the United States Department of Defense and the Haskell Indian Nations University, which the Bureau of Indian Affairs governs. The University of the District of Columbia is the public university in Washington, D.C., overseen by the Government of the District of Columbia under authority devolved from Congress under District of Columbia home rule. Private universities in the District of Columbia also hold federal charters but are not public.

Historically, several prestigious universities in the United States are private, most notably the Ivy League. Nonetheless, a number of public universities are highly prestigious and selective. One purpose of such public schools is to provide equivalent education to a much larger and wider number of students than private schools did. Many public universities are elected members of the Association of American Universities or may be informally referred to as a Public Ivies. For example, the University of California, Berkeley is often ranked as a top-ten university in the world and the top public university in the United States. There are a number of public liberal arts colleges, including the members of the Council of Public Liberal Arts Colleges.

Community colleges in the United States are generally public colleges. They typically offer associate's degrees for two academic years of post-secondary school. In contrast, bachelor's degrees from universities represent four academic years of post-secondary school. In the 21st century, some community colleges have added bachelor's degree programs, particularly in applied career-focused subjects.

== Oceania ==
=== Australia ===
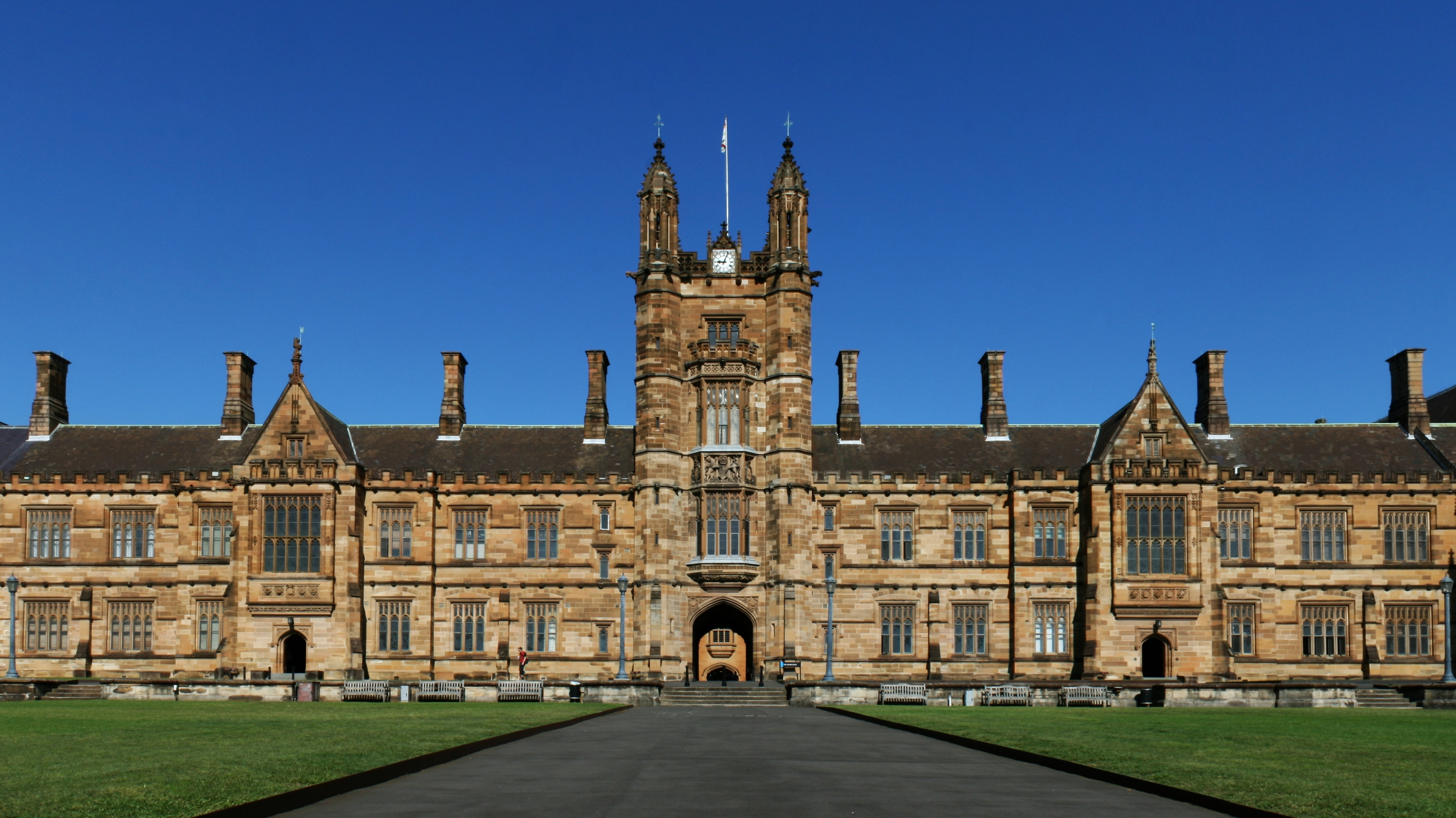
University of Sydney in Sydney

Australia has 43 universities, with 37 being public universities. The Group of Eight includes some of the oldest public universities in Australia, including the University of Queensland, University of Sydney, University of Melbourne, University of New South Wales, University of Adelaide, University of Western Australia, Australian National University, and Monash University.

The Australian Technology Network of public universities grew from the former Institutes of Technology and include RMIT University, Queensland University of Technology, Curtin University, the University of Technology Sydney, and the University of South Australia. These former technology institutes gained university status in the late 1980s through the early 1990s due to the reforms made by John Dawkins, then Minister for Employment, Education, and Training. Innovative Research Universities represents several public research-intensive institutions, with most members being established in the 1960s and 1970s. The group includes Charles Darwin University, James Cook University, Griffith University, La Trobe University, Flinders University, Murdoch University, and Western Sydney University.

The Regional Universities Network includes seven regional Australian public universities, including Central Queensland University, Southern Cross University, Federation University, the University of Southern Queensland, the University of the Sunshine Coast, University of New England (Australia), and Charles Sturt University. The NUW Alliance consists of three public universities in New South Wales: University of Newcastle, University of New South Wales, and University of Wollongong.

=== New Zealand ===
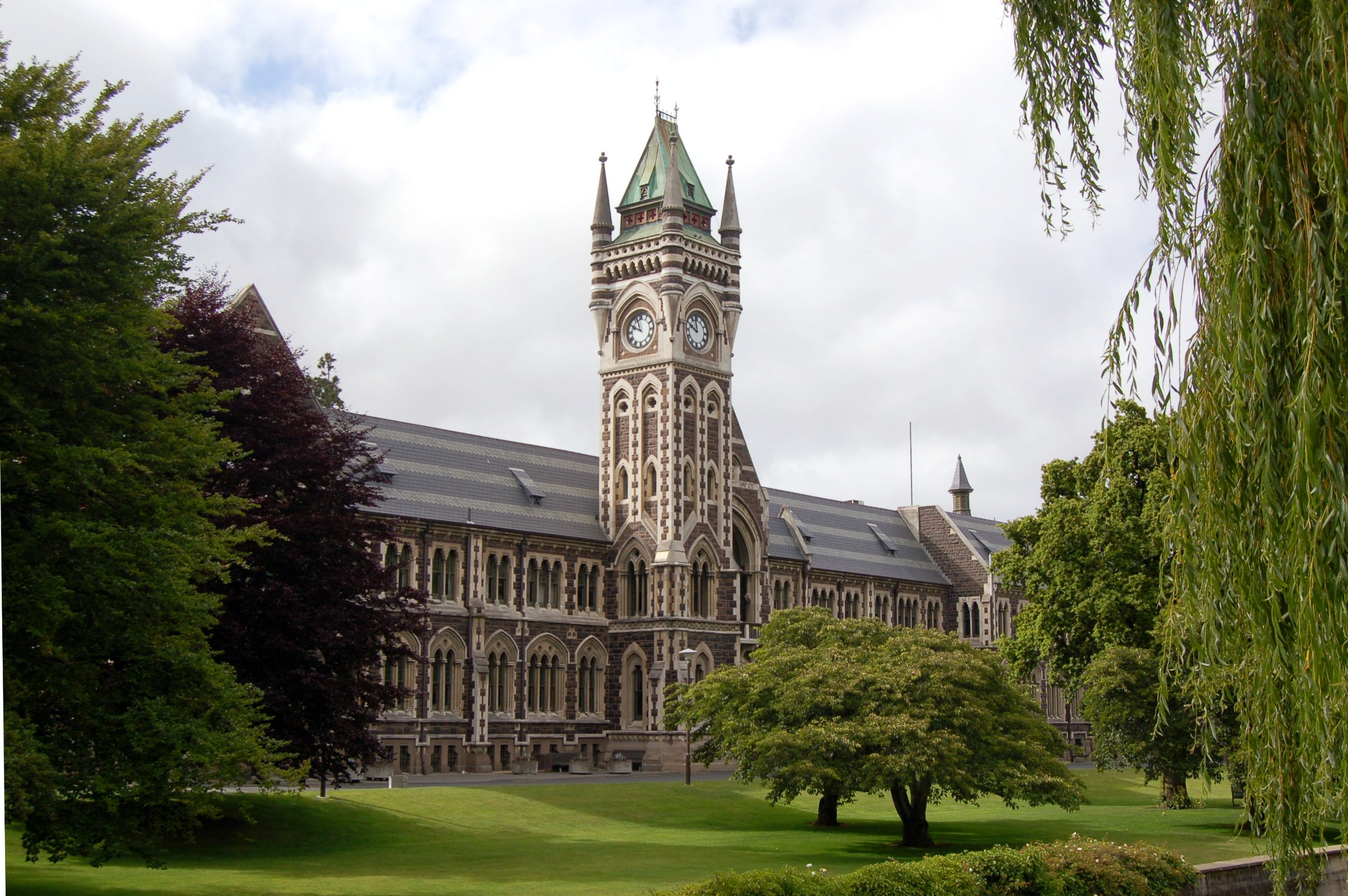
University of Otago in Dunedin, New Zealand

In New Zealand, all eight universities are public. The University of Otago is the oldest and was established in 1869 by Provincial Ordinance. From 1870 to 1961, the University of New Zealand was effectively a single university structure with constituent colleges located in Auckland, Wellington, Christchurch, and Dunedin. In 1961, the New Zealand Parliament dissolved the constituent colleges to form four independent universities: University of Auckland, Victoria University of Wellington, University of Canterbury, and University of Otago. This change also established a new university in Hamilton, the University of Waikato.

Two former agricultural colleges, Massey University and Lincoln University, became universities in 1963 and 1990, respectively. Auckland University of Technology was established in 2000 by an Order in Council under the Education Act 1989.

== South America ==
=== Argentina ===
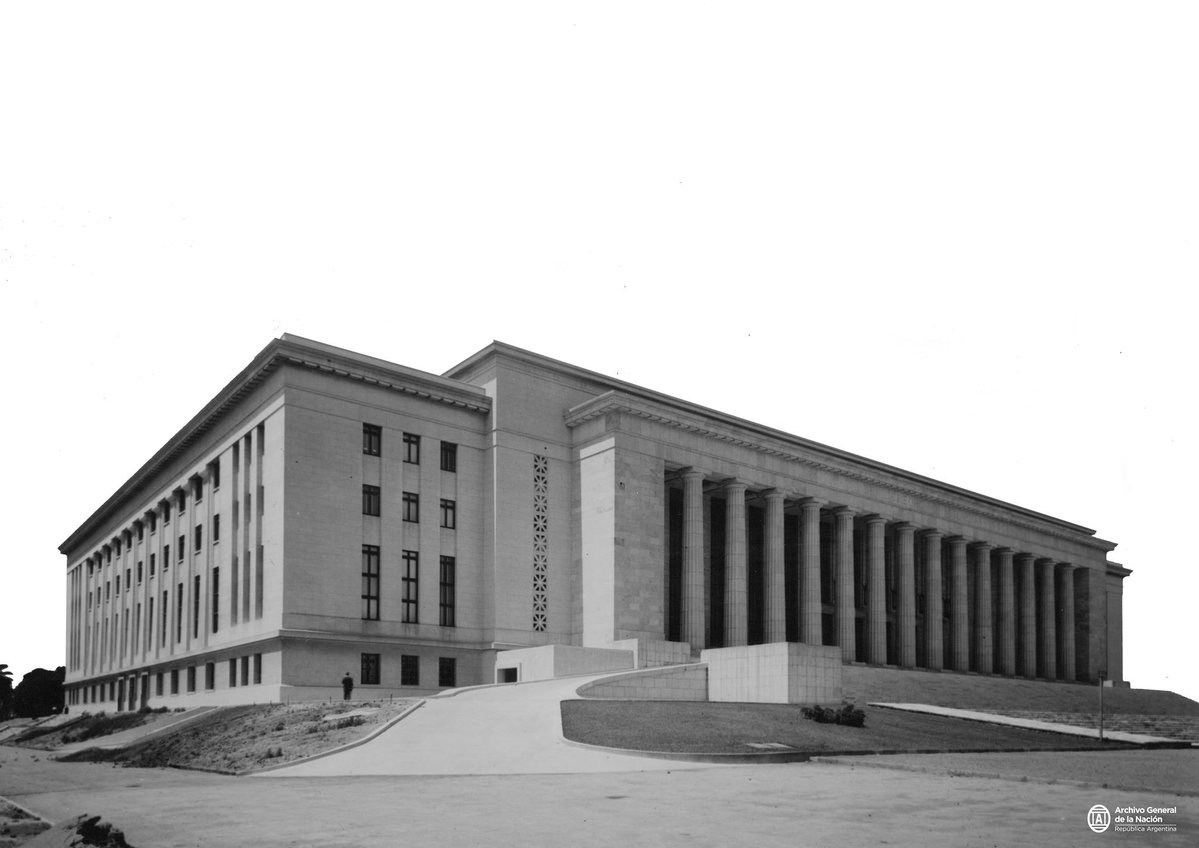
School of Law of the University of Buenos Aires in Buenos Aires, Argentina

In Argentina, the national universities, also called public or state-run universities, were created by a National Congress Act. The exception is universities that predate the state, such as the National University of Córdoba and the University of Buenos Aires that are public law legal entities. The Argentinian government sets funding for public universities through the annual national budget act.

National universities are located in all provinces and serve over eighty percent of the country's undergraduate population. These universities are tuition-free for students, as is access to books in the universities' libraries. Students typically purchase course books and studying materials; scholarships are available for low-income students.

Argentina's national universities account for over fifty percent of the country's scientific research and provide technical assistance to the public and private sectors.

=== Brazil ===
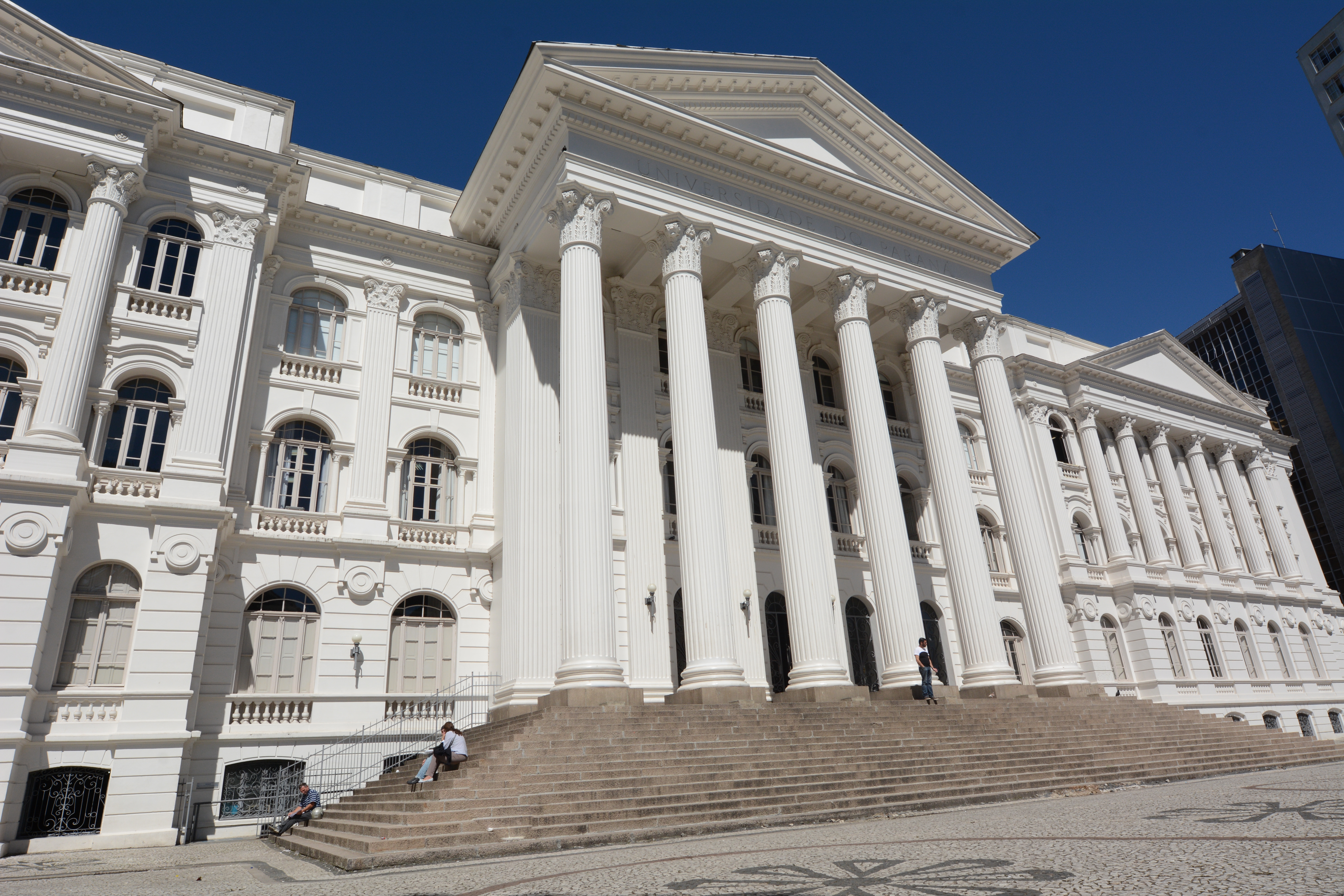
Federal University of Paraná, in Curitiba, Brazil

In Brazil, the federal or state governments fund a few hundred public universities, including the University of São Paulo, the University of Campinas, the Federal University of Rio Grande do Sul, the Federal University of Rio de Janeiro, the Federal University of Minas Gerais, the Federal University of Bahia, and the Federal Institutes.

The Brazilian Federal Constitution establishes the right to attend public universities free of tuition or entrance fees. Because public universities have thousands of applicants annually, only the best students can pass the entrance examinations. The examinations are either vestibular (specific to the university) or the country-wide ENEM. Since 2005, the Brazilian government has offered some tuition grants to enable students experiencing poverty to attend private universities.

At many public universities, there are quotas of around fifty percent for students whose secondary (high school) education was entirely in a public-funded school. Public universities also have racial quotas, usually restricted to students from public high schools. Some universities give extra points on their admission tests instead of using a quota system. For example, at the Federal University of Minas Gerais, public high school students are granted a 10% bonus over their test grade, and public school students who declare themselves black or pardo (mixed-race) receive a 15% bonus.

Public universities are responsible for granting nearly all the graduate degrees in Brazil, including doctorates and masters which are called doutorado and mestrado, respectively. Professors at public universities are public servants, tenured and hired through public application, with international research publications being a significant criterion. A public university professor's teaching load is usually modest and leaves time for research. As a result, public university graduate programs are the primary source of Brazilian academic research.

In contrast, most private institutions are for-profit enterprises that hire teachers on an hourly basis and conduct comparatively little research; notable exceptions are a few private but non-profit universities affiliated with religious organizations, such as the Mackenzie Presbyterian University of São Paulo and the Pontifical Catholic University of Rio de Janeiro.

=== Chile ===
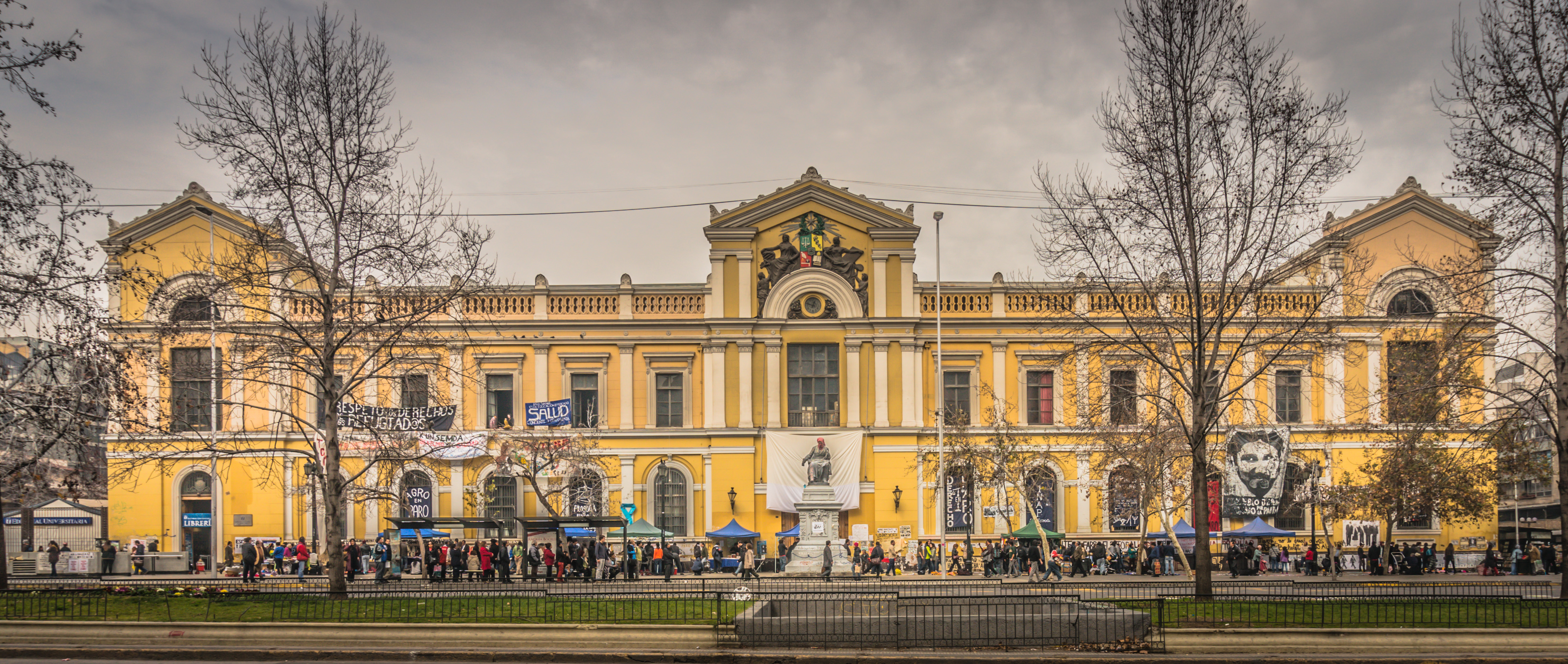
Universidad de Chile in Santiago, Chile

In Chile, state-run universities are less expensive than private ones but are not tuition-free. Chile spends only four percent of its GDP on education, compared to the 7% recommended by the United Nations for developed nations. As a result, students and their families must cover 75 percent of tuition costs for attending both public and private universities.

The most prestigious universities are the state-run Universidad de Chile and the private with state funding Pontificia Universidad Católica de Chile, Universidad de Concepción, and Universidad Técnica Federico Santa María. The Universidad de Chile is the country's leading research institution.

=== Peru ===
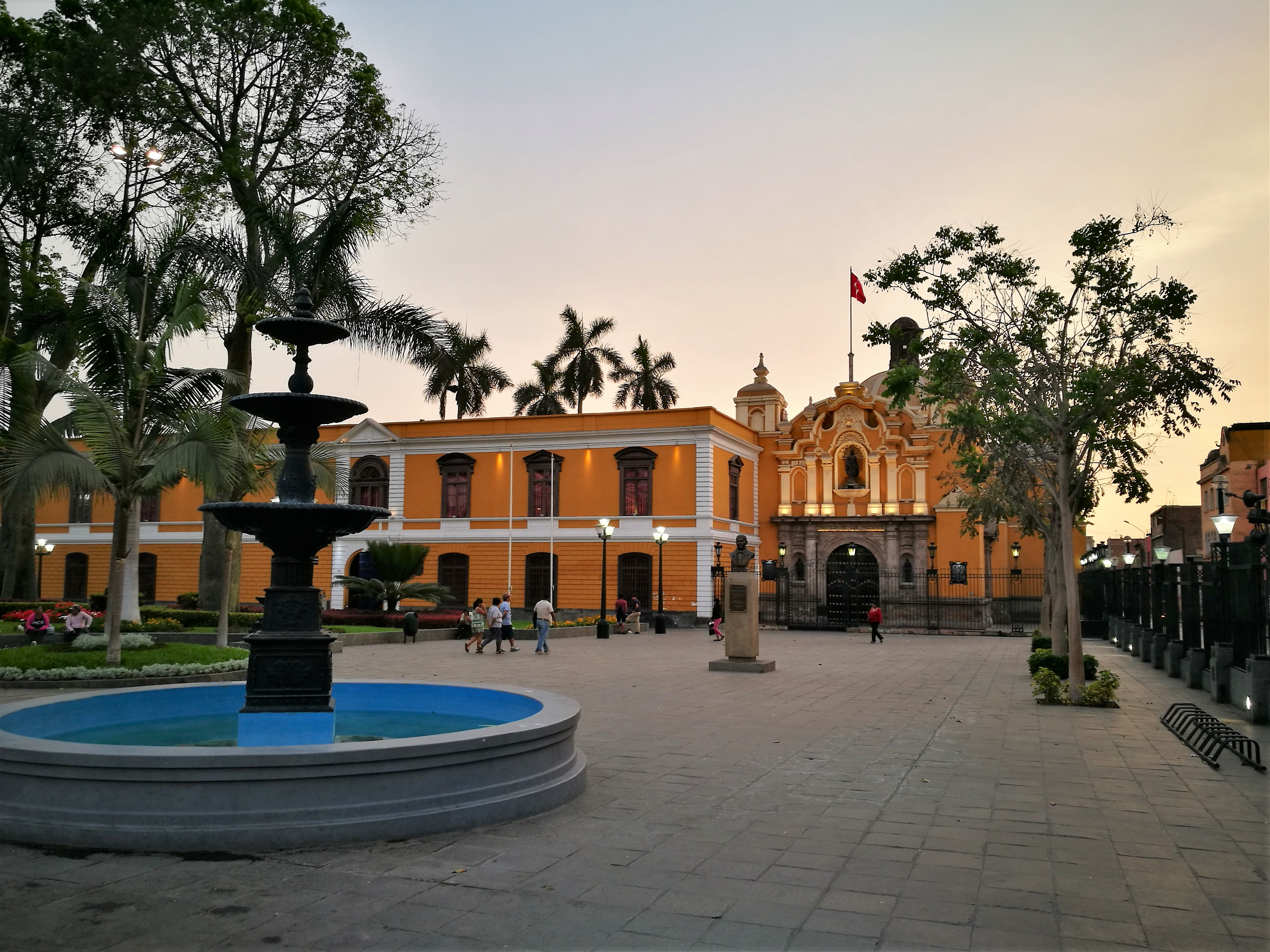
National University of San Marcos in Lima, Peru

Historically, many of the prestigious universities in Peru have been public, including the National University of San Marcos. Founded in May 1551, it is the top university in Peru and the oldest university in the Americas. To be admitted into one of the national public universities, students must have a high score on the admission test.

In 2002, the most prestigious public universities joined and created the Strategic Alliance of Peruvian Universities, including National University of San Marcos, La Molina – National Agrarian University, National University of Engineering, Federico Villarreal University, and the National University of Callao. Other public and private universities joined as an associate or advisory members.

== See also ==
- Private university
- State university system
- National university
