= New World Translation =

Jehovah's Witnesses Bible translation

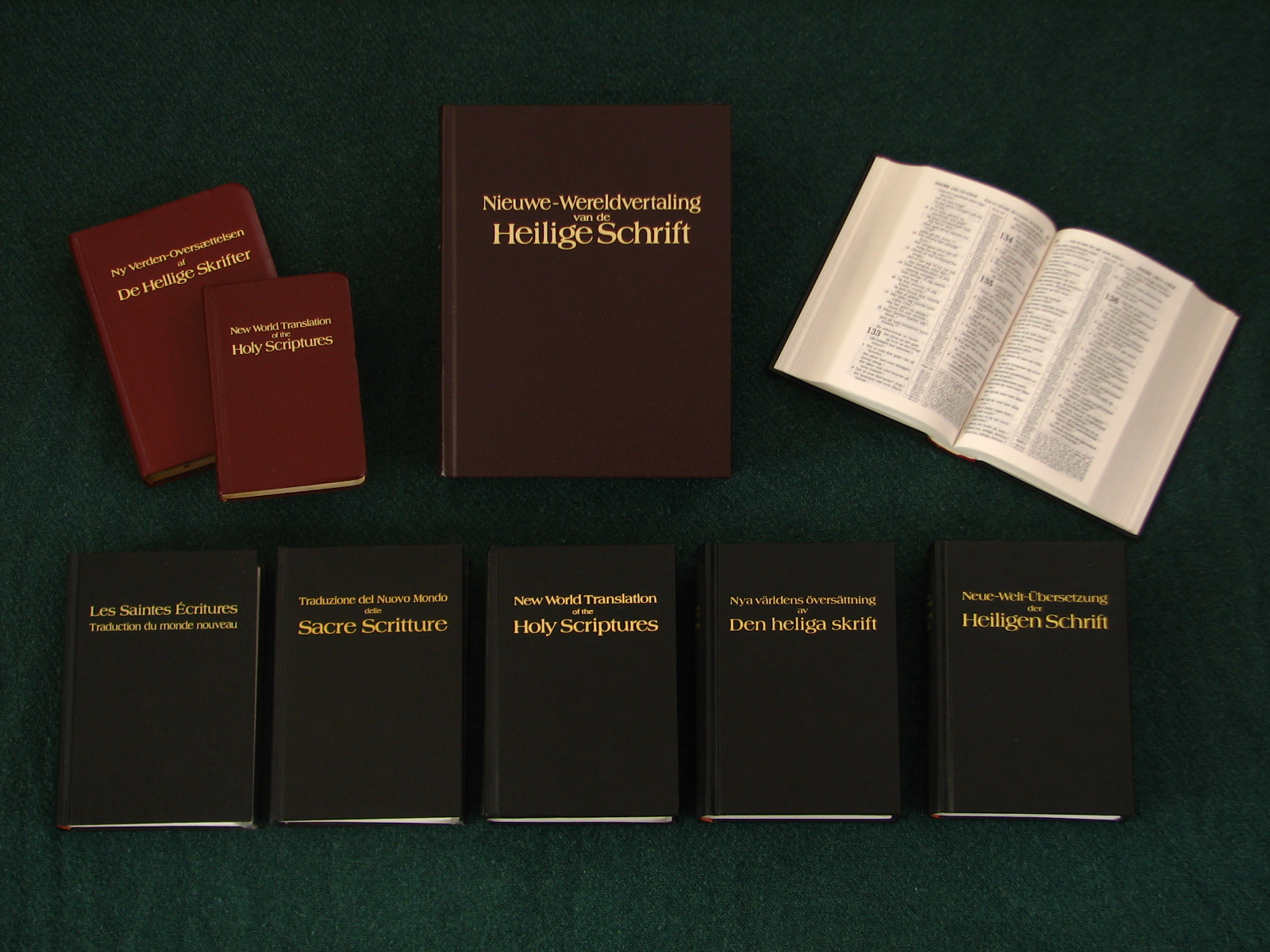
- Full name: New World Translation of the Holy Scriptures
- Abbreviation: NWT (Note: It can also be found abbreviated as the NW.)
- Language: 350 languages
- NT published: 1950
- Complete Bible published: 1960
- Authorship: New World Bible Translation Committee
- Textual basis: OT: Biblia Hebraica; NT: Westcott & Hort
- Translation type: Formal Equivalence and Dynamic Equivalence
- Revision: 1961, 1970, 1971, 1981, 1984, 2013
- Copies printed: More than 256 million
- Religious affiliation: Jehovah's Witnesses
- Webpage: www.jw.org/en/library/bible/
- Genesis 1:1–3 In the beginning God created the heavens and the earth. Now the earth was formless and desolate, and there was darkness upon the surface of the watery deep, and God's active force was moving about over the surface of the waters. And God said: "Let there be light." Then there was light. John 3:16 For God loved the world so much that he gave his only-begotten Son, so that everyone exercising faith in him might not be destroyed but have everlasting life.

The New World Translation of the Holy Scriptures (NWT, also simply NW) is a translation of the Bible published by the Watch Tower Bible and Tract Society; it is used and distributed by Jehovah's Witnesses. The New Testament portion was released in 1950 as the New World Translation of the Christian Greek Scriptures, with the first revised edition of the complete New World Translation of the Holy Scriptures released in 1961.

It is not the first Bible to be published by the Watch Tower Society, but it is its first translation into English. Commentators have noted that scholarly effort went into producing the translation, but many have described it as biased.

== History ==
Until the release of the New World Translation, Jehovah's Witnesses in English-speaking countries primarily used the King James Version. According to the publishers, one of the main reasons for producing a new translation was that most Bible versions in common use, including the Authorized Version (King James), employed archaic language. The stated intention was to produce a fresh translation, free of archaisms. Additionally, over the centuries since the King James Version was produced, more copies of earlier manuscripts of the original texts in the Hebrew and Greek languages had become available. According to the publishers, better manuscript evidence had made it possible to determine with greater accuracy what the original writers intended, particularly in more obscure passages, allowing linguists to better understand certain aspects of the original languages.

A fresh translation of the New Testament, which Jehovah's Witnesses usually refer to as the Christian Greek Scriptures, was proposed in October 1946 by the president of the Watch Tower Society, Nathan H. Knorr. Work began on December 2, 1947, when the "New World Bible Translation Committee" was formed, composed of Jehovah's Witnesses who professed to be anointed. The Watch Tower Society is said to have "become aware" of the committee's existence a year later. The committee agreed to turn over its translation to the Society for publication and on September 3, 1949, Knorr convened a joint meeting of the board of directors of both the Watch Tower Society's New York and Pennsylvania corporations where he again announced to the directors the existence of the committee and that it was now able to print its new modern English translation of the Christian Greek Scriptures. Several chapters of the translation were read to the directors, who then voted to accept it as a gift. The New World Translation of the Christian Greek Scriptures was released at a Jehovah's Witness convention at Yankee Stadium, New York, on August 2, 1950; a revised edition was released on May 1, 1951

The translation of the Old Testament, which Jehovah's Witnesses refer to as the Hebrew Scriptures, was released in five volumes in 1953, 1955, 1957, 1958, and 1960. The first revision of the complete New World Translation of the Holy Scriptures was released as a single volume in 1961, and has since undergone various revisions. Cross references that had appeared in the six separate volumes were updated and included in the complete volume in the 1984 revision.

In 1961, the Watch Tower Society began to translate the New World Translation into Dutch, French, German, Italian, Portuguese, and Spanish; the New Testament in these languages was released simultaneously in July 1963 in Milwaukee, Wisconsin. By 1989, the New World Translation was translated into eleven languages, with more than 56,000,000 copies printed.

For many years, the New World Translation was thought to be the Watch Tower Society's first original translation of ancient Biblical Hebrew, Koine Greek, and Old Aramaic biblical texts, until the re-discovery of the German Magdeburger Bibel ("Magdeburg Bible"), formally called Die heiligen Schriften ("The Holy Scriptures").

=== Translators ===
The New World Translation was produced by the New World Bible Translation Committee, formed in 1947. This committee is said to have comprised unnamed members of multinational backgrounds. The committee requested that the Watch Tower Society not publish the names of its members, stating that they did not want to "advertise themselves but let all the glory go to the Author of the Scriptures, God," adding that the translation, "should direct the reader, not to the translators, but to the Bible’s Author, Jehovah God". The publishers stated that "the particulars of [the New World Bible Translation Committee's members] university or other educational training are not the important thing" and that "the translation testifies to their qualification".

In 1964, Bruce M. Metzger wrote: "on the whole, one gains a tolerably good impression of the scholarly equipment of the translators (their names are not divulged) [...] Frequently an intelligent use of a critical information is apparent".

In 1974, William I. and Joan Cetnar, who had worked at the Watchtower Society's headquarters, stated that Nathan H. Knorr, Fredrick W. Franz, Albert D. Schroeder, George D. Gangas and Milton G. Henschel used to meet with the translation committee. The Cetnars said that only Franz had the necessary qualifications to act as critical biblical translators. Raymond Franz, a former member of the Governing Body and of the denomination until 1981, identified four members of the translation team. In 1983, in his book Crisis of Conscience, he listed Knorr, Franz, Schroeder and Gangas as members of the translation team, adding that only Frederick Franz had sufficient knowledge in biblical languages. In 1998, Greg G. Stafford said that the composition of the translation committee cannot be established with certainty, and that even if Franz were a member without knowledge of Hebrew, this would not preclude his knowledge of Koine Greek or diminish the qualifications of other members.

In 2003, Jason BeDuhn noted, "the members of the translation team remain anonymous, just as they do for the NKJB and the Lockman Foundation's NASB". In 2003, William E. Paul said that "although not openly so advertised, it appears Franz was the leading translator of the Jehovah's Witnesses' Bible translation". In 2008, George D. Chryssides opines that George D. Gangas "was proficient in Greek, and it is speculated that he was a member of the New World Translation Committee". In 2016, Chryssides observes that, the translation committee apparently did not possess formal academic qualifications in Hebrew or Greek—credentials typically regarded as necessary for undertaking a task of such complexity—they nevertheless produced an independent translation of the Bible; he notes this outcome as significant, as it appears to challenge the assumption that such work can only be effectively completed by individuals with specialist academic expertise.

=== Revisions ===
In 1970, the translation was revised, with the publisher citing changes in modern English usage and a better understanding of the Hebraic and Greek languages. In 1971, footnotes were added. In 1981, another revision was released, which included a concordance and appendix. A large-print edition was released in 1984.

At the Watch Tower Society's annual meeting on October 5, 2013, a significantly revised translation was released. Referring to the new revision, the publishers stated, "There are now about 10 percent fewer English words in the translation. Some key Biblical terms were revised. Certain chapters were changed to poetic format, and clarifying footnotes were added to the regular edition." The Pericope Adulterae (John 7:53 – 8:11) and the Short and Long Conclusions of Mark 16 (Mark 16:8–20)—offset from the main text in earlier editions—were removed. The new revision was also released as part of an app called JW Library. The 2013 edition of the New World Translation has been translated, in whole or in part, into more than 326 languages.

== Translation ==
According to the Watch Tower Society, the New World Translation attempts to convey the intended sense of original-language words according to the context. The original New World Translation employs nearly 16,000 English expressions to translate about 5,500 biblical Greek terms, and over 27,000 English expressions to translate about 8,500 Hebrew terms. The translators state that, where possible in the target language, the New World Translation prefers literal renderings and does not paraphrase the original text.

=== Textual basis ===
The master text used for translating the Old Testament into English was Kittel's Biblia Hebraica. The Hebrew texts, Biblia Hebraica Stuttgartensia and Biblia Hebraica Quinta were used for preparing the latest version of this translation. Other works consulted in preparing the translation include Aramaic Targums, the Dead Sea Scrolls, the Samaritan Torah, the Greek Septuagint, the Latin Vulgate, the Masoretic Text, the Cairo Codex, the Aleppo Codex, Christian David Ginsburg's Hebrew Text, and the Leningrad Codex.

Diagrammatic representation of textual basis

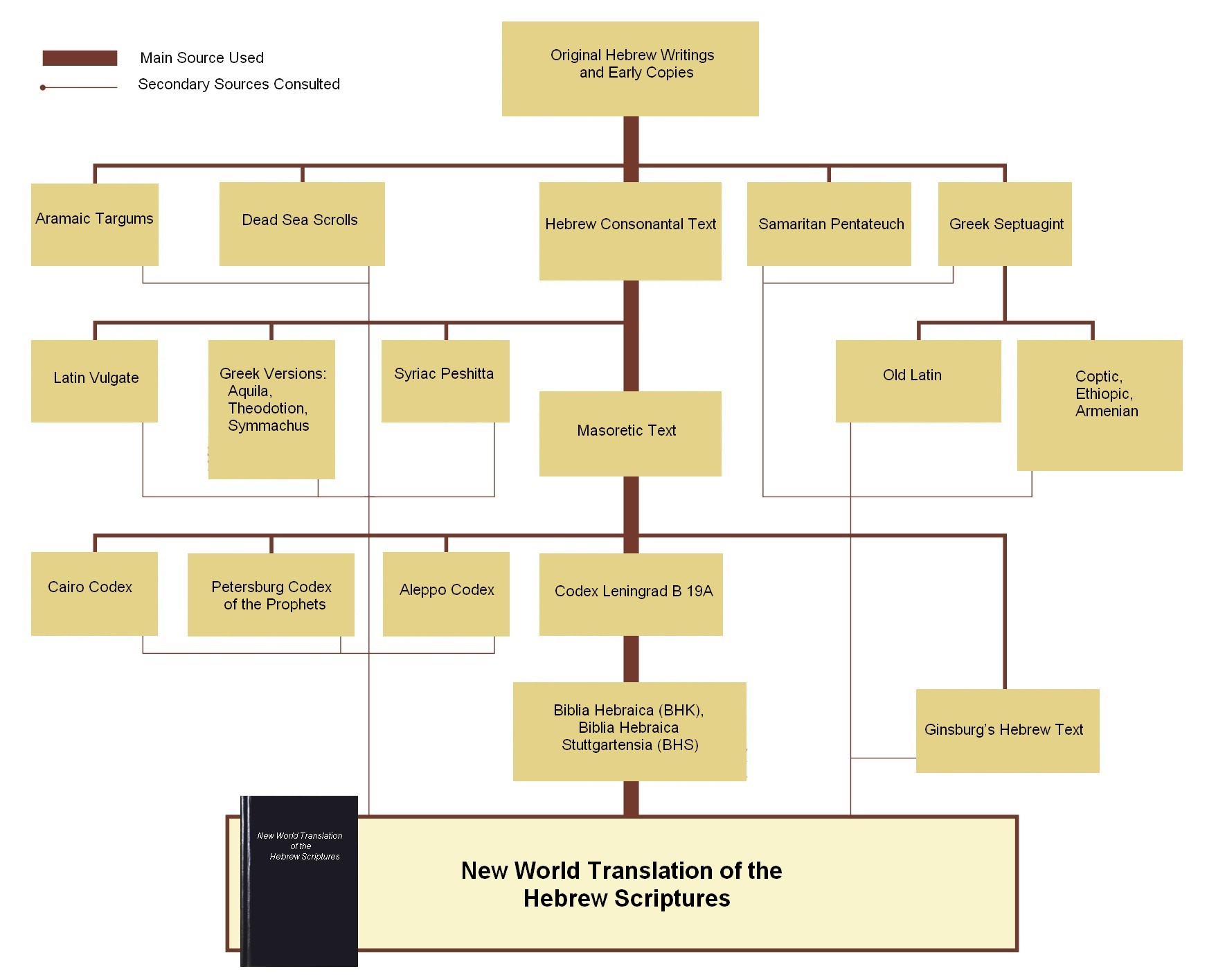
Hebrew

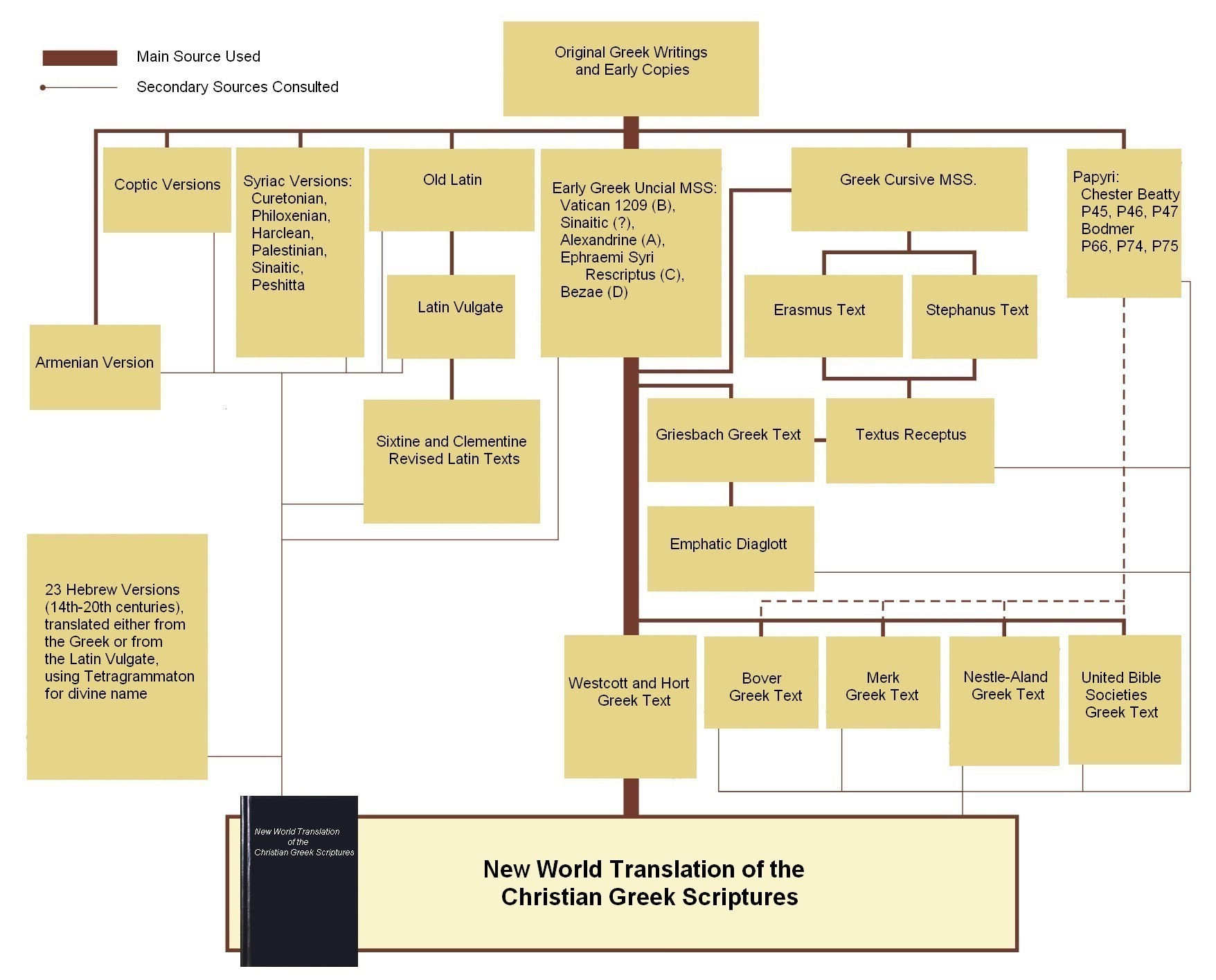
Greek

The Greek master text by the Cambridge University scholars B. F. Westcott and F. J. A. Hort (1881) was used as the basis for translating the New Testament into English. The committee also referred to the Novum Testamentum Graece (18th edition, 1948) and to works by Jesuit scholars José M. Bover (1943), and Augustinus Merk (1948). The United Bible Societies' text (1975) and the Nestle-Aland text (1979) were used to update the footnotes in the 1984 version. Additional works consulted in preparing the New World Translation include the Armenian Version, Coptic Versions, the Latin Vulgate, Sistine and Clementine Revised Latin Texts, Textus Receptus, the Johann Jakob Griesbach's Greek text, the Emphatic Diaglott, and various papyri.

=== Other languages ===
Translation into other languages is based on the English text, supplemented by comparison with the Hebrew and Greek text. The complete New World Translation has been published in more than one hundred languages or scripts, with the New Testament available in more than fifty additional languages.

When the Writing Committee approves the translation of the Bible into a new language, it appoints a group of baptized Jehovah's Witnesses to serve as a translation team. Translators are given a list of words and expressions commonly used in the English New World Translation with related English words grouped together (e.g. atone, atonement, or propitiation). A list of vernacular equivalents is then composed. A database of Greek and Hebrew terms is available where a translator has difficulty rendering a verse. The vernacular terms are then applied to the text in the target language. Further editing and translation are then performed to produce a final version.

In 1989, a Translation Services Department was established at the world headquarters of Jehovah's Witnesses, overseen by the Writing Committee of the Governing Body. The goal of the Translation Services Department was to accelerate Bible translation with the aid of computer technology. Previously, some Bible translation projects lasted twenty years or more. Under the direction of the Translation Services Department, translation of the Old Testament in a particular language may be completed in as little as two years. During the period from 1963 to 1989, the New World Translation became available in ten additional languages. Since the formation of the Translation Services Department, there has been a significant increase in the number of languages in which the New World Translation has been made available.

== Features ==
The layout resembles the 1901 edition of the American Standard Version. The translators use the terms "Hebrew-Aramaic Scriptures" and "Christian Greek Scriptures" rather than "Old Testament" and "New Testament", stating that the use of "testament" was based on a misunderstanding of 2 Corinthians 3:14. Headings were included at the top of each page to assist in locating texts; these have been replaced in the 2013 revision by an "Outline of Contents" introducing each Bible book. There is also an index listing scriptures by subject.

Square brackets [ ] were added around words that were inserted editorially, but were removed as of the 2006 printing. Double brackets were used to indicate text considered doubtful. The pronoun "you" was printed in small capitals (i.e., YOU) to indicate plurality, as were some verbs when plurality may be unclear. These features were discontinued in the 2013 release. The New World Translation attempts to indicate progressive rather than completed actions, such as "proceeded to rest" in Genesis 2:2 instead of "rested". The 2013 release indicates progressive verbs only where considered contextually important.

=== Use of the name Jehovah ===
==== Old Testament ====
The name Jehovah is a translation of the Tetragrammaton (Hebrew: יהוה, transliterated as YHWH, though the original pronunciation is unknown). The New World Translation uses the name Jehovah 6,979 times in the Old Testament. According to the Watch Tower Society, the Tetragrammaton appears in "the oldest fragments of the Greek Septuagint". In reference to the Septuagint, biblical scholar Paul E. Kahle stated, "We now know that the Greek Bible text as far as it was written by Jews for Jews did not translate the Divine name by Kyrios, but the Tetragrammaton written with Hebrew or Greek letters was retained in such MSS (manuscripts). It was the Christians who replaced the Tetragrammaton by Kyrios when the divine name written in Hebrew letters was not understood any more." However, according to professor Albert Pietersma, since pre-Christian times Adonai and the Tetragrammaton were considered equivalent to the Greek term kyrios. Pietersma stated, "The translators felt no more bound to retain the tetragram in written form than they felt compelled to render distinctively Hebrew el, Elohim or Shaddai." He also considers that old manuscripts containing the tetragram, like the papyrus Fouad 266, "is evidence of a secondary stage."

==== New Testament ====
The New World Translation also uses the name Jehovah 237 times in the New Testament where the extant texts use only the Greek words kyrios (Lord) and theos (God). The use of Jehovah in the New Testament is very rare, but not unique to the New World Translation. Walter Martin, an evangelical minister, wrote, "It can be shown from literally thousands of copies of the Greek New Testament that not once does the tetragrammaton appear." However, the translators of the New World Translation believed that the name Jehovah was present in the original manuscripts of the New Testament when quoting from the Old Testament, but replaced with the other terms by later copyists. Based on this reasoning, the translators consider to have "restored the divine name", though it is not present in any extant manuscripts.

=== Editions ===
==== Student Edition ====
In 1963, a special student edition of the New World Translation (NWT) was published. Comparing to the first revision of the 1961 in one volume, that edition was containing in one volume, the unrevised version of the six volumes.

==== Reference Edition ====
In 1984, a Reference edition of the NWT was released in addition to a revision of the regular volume. The regular edition includes several appendices containing arguments for various translation decisions, maps, diagrams and other information; and over 125,000 cross references. The reference edition contains the cross references and adds footnotes about translation decisions and additional appendices that provide further detail relating to certain translation decisions and doctrinal views. The Reference edition is out of print as of the release of the 2013 revision of the New World Translation, but is available online.

==== Study Edition ====
The English study edition of the Gospel of Matthew was officially released in October 2015 (online and in the JW Library app); since then, additional content has been added as the study material for each book is completed, and the work is still ongoing. In 2017, a study edition of the NWT was printed. That edition is based upon the 2013 revision. It contains only the books of Matthew, Mark, Luke, John and Acts, with introduction to each books, a lot of colorful images and maps and footnotes and study notes.

==== Kingdom Interlinear Translation of the Greek Scriptures ====
The New World Bible Translation Committee included the English text from the New World Translation in its 1969 and 1985 editions of The Kingdom Interlinear Translation of the Greek Scriptures. It also incorporates the Greek text published by Westcott and Hort in The New Testament in the Original Greek and a literal word-for-word translation.

==== Braille Editions ====
In 1983, the English Braille edition of the New World Translation's New Testament was released; the complete English Braille edition was released by 1988. NWT editions have since become available in several additional Braille scripts.

==== Non-print editions ====
===== Audio Editions =====
In 1978, the Watch Tower Society began producing recordings of the New World Translation on audio cassette, with the New Testament released by 1981 and the Old Testament in three albums released by 1990. In 2004, the NWT was released on compact disc in MP3 format in major languages. Since 2008, audio downloads of the NWT have been made available in 18 languages in MP3 and AAC formats, including support for podcasts.

===== Sign Languages Editions =====
Production of the NWT in American Sign Language began in 2006; the New Testament was made available by 2010, and the complete ASL edition was released in February 2020.

===== Digital Editions =====
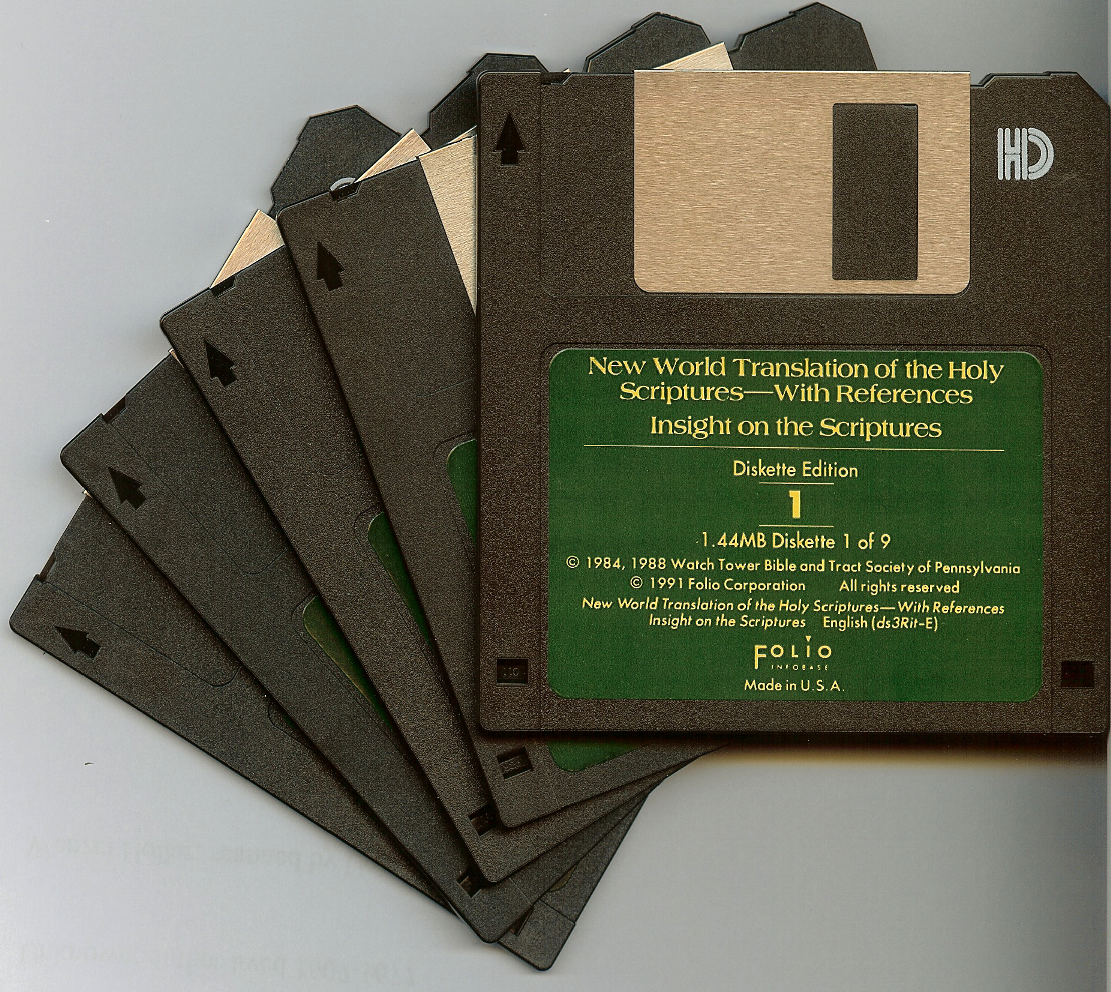
A diskette edition of the NWT released in 1993

In 1992, a digital edition of the New World Translation of the Holy Scriptures—With References was released on floppy disk.

Since 1994, the New World Translation of the Holy Scriptures—With References has been included in the Watchtower Library on CD-ROM. Both editions of the New World Translation are available online in various languages and digital formats.

Since 2015, a Study Edition of the New World Translation has been gradually released online starting with the books of the New Testament, based on the 2013 revision with additional reference material.

== Critical review ==
Biblical scholars have noted the New World Translation's attempts at accurate conservative translation, its critical apparatus, and its use of modern critical editions of the biblical manuscripts. Criticism of the New World Translation focuses mainly on Christological issues in its rendering of the New Testament: the translation of the word Kyrios (Greek: Κύριος) as "Jehovah" —usually translated as "Lord" by classical translators, its rendering of passages related to the doctrine of the Trinity and the divinity of Christ such as John 1:1, and for its difficult-to-understand formal equivalence. Critics of the movement claim that the NWT is scholastically dishonest.

=== Overall review ===
In 1954, Unitarian theologian Charles Francis Potter stated about the New World Translation of the Christian Greek Scriptures (1950) and the first volume of the New World Translation of the Hebrew Scriptures (1953): "Apart from a few semantic peculiarities like translating the Greek word stauros as 'stake' instead of 'cross', and the often startling use of the colloquial and the vernacular, the anonymous translators have certainly rendered the best manuscript texts, both Greek and Hebrew, with scholarly ability and acumen."

In 1961 F. F. Bruce stated: "some of its distinctive renderings reflect the biblical interpretations which we have come to associate with Jehovah's Witnesses (e. g. 'the Word was a god" in John 1:1)". He also stated that "some of the renderings which are free from a theological tendency strike one as quite good".

In 1982, Pentecostal theologian Gordon Fee and Douglas K. Stuart, in their How to Read the Bible for All Its Worth, called the New World Translation "an extremely literal translation filled with the heretical doctrines of this cult". In 1985, Alan Stewart Duthie responded to the assertion, saying that although "there are some heretical doctrines to be found ... [it] does not reach even 0.1% of the whole, which is very far from 'full'". Duthie adds "if your purpose is to study the Bible in detail [...] then you can be recommended to use NJB or NAB for their accessibility and commentary features, or study edition of other translations. If your study interest is more in the original wording, then you could use RSV or NWT or NASV".

In its review of Bible translations released from 1955 to 1985, The HarperCollins Bible Dictionary (1996) listed the New World Translation among the major modern translations.

In October 1996, James B. Parkinson compared various translations and gave scores for accuracy for 30 Old Testament translations and 51 New Testament translations. Parkinson gave a score of 76 to the NWT Old Testament (1960). For the New Testament he gave the NWT (1950) overall: 75, manuscripts: 99 and translation: 66.5. He scored the Kingdom Interlinear Translation (1985) overall: 80, manuscripts: 99 and translation: 73.5. Parkinson stated, "the Jehovah's Witnesses' New World Translation (NWT, 1950) offers a relatively accurate translation from a different theological perspective. Like Rotherham, though, it is often not smooth reading."

Jason BeDuhn stated in 2003 that the differences between Jehovah's Witnesses' theology and that of mainstream denominations, "creates a hostile atmosphere in which every representative of that mainstream theology charges that any variation in the NW from more familiar translation must serve the ulterior motives of distorting the 'truth'".

In 2004, Anthony Byatt and Hal Flemings published their anthology 'Your Word is Truth', Essays in Celebration of the 50th Anniversary of the New World Translation of the Holy Scriptures (1950, 1953). They included essays responding to criticism of the New World Translation from non-Witnesses, and a bibliography of reviews of the work.

George D. Chryssides stated in 2016 that much criticism lacks scholarly rigor, often stemming from inadequate knowledge of the original languages; more balanced analysis recognizes that all translation involves interpretive presuppositions, a dynamic described by the hermeneutical circle. He also states that the New World Translation aims at literal fidelity, even at the expense of style. Chryssides adds that while the use of "Jehovah" in the New Testament lacks manuscript evidence, its defenders argue that its connection to the Septuagint's rendering of the divine name provides a limited contextual justification. Chryssides stated in 2019 that the unfavourable criticisms by Harold Henry Rowley (1953), Julius R. Mantey (1974) and William Barclay (1953) "were extremely vague", but that Bruce M. Metzger (1953) "mentioned a few specific passages which he believed were wrongly translated." According to the Watch Tower Society, Chryssides said: "it is fair to say that the New World Translation has been criticized by mainstream scholars. Such criticisms, however, are on a limited number of doctrinal matters that turn on the translation of certain key texts".

=== Old Testament ===
Regarding the New World Translation's use of English in the first volume of the New World Translation of the Hebrew Scriptures (Genesis to Ruth, 1953), biblical scholar Harold Henry Rowley was critical of what he called "wooden literalism" and "harsh construction". He characterized these as "an insult to the Word of God", citing various verses of Genesis as examples. Rowley concluded, "From beginning to end this [first] volume is a shining example of how the Bible should not be translated." He added in a subsequent review that "the second volume shows the same faults as the first." While a member of the denomination, Rolf Furuli—a former professor in Semitic languages—said that a literal translation that follows the sentence structure of the source language rather than target language must be somewhat wooden and unidiomatic. Furuli added that Rowley's assessment based on his own preference for idiomatic translations ignores the NWT's stated objective of being as literal as possible.

Samuel Haas, in his 1955 review of the first volume of the NWT in the Journal of Biblical Literature, stated that he did not agree with the introduction of the name Jehovah: "that those responsible for this new translation fall under [...] condemnation, in spite of much scholarship and great industry, is evident in a number of ways. Religious bias is shown most clearly in the policy of translating the tetragrammaton as Jehovah". Haas adds that he disagrees with the substitution of "Jehovah" for "Adonai" in Genesis 18:3, because, according to him, it appears in the Massorah but not in the Hebrew text. He concluded, "this work indicates a great deal of effort and thought as well as considerable scholarship, it is to be regretted that religious bias was allowed to colour many passages." John Joseph Owens agrees with Haas, and wrote in 1956 the following regarding formal equivalence: "although the effort to make an accurate translation of the verbs is admirable and revealing, the literalness and stiff expressions add to the absence of clarity and specific meanings". Owens also stated that "there is no adequate reason to support the use of the word Jehovah for the covenant name of God", and it's "even worse" to include it in Genesis 18:3. Owens concludes: "I agree with another reviewer of this volume who indicated that this is not the way to translate the Old Testament".

In 1960, Frederick William Danker wrote, "not to be snubbed is the New World Translation of the Hebrew Scriptures, Rendered from the Original by the New World Translation Committee... 'the orthodox' do not possess all the truth, yet one does well to 'test the spirits'."

In 1981, biblical scholar Benjamin Kedar-Kopfstein stated that the Old Testament work is largely based on the formal structure of biblical Hebrew. In 1989, Kedar-Kopfstein said, "In my linguistic research in connection with the Hebrew Bible and translations, I often refer to the English edition of what is known as the 'New World Translation.' In so doing, I find my feeling repeatedly confirmed that this work reflects an honest endeavor to achieve an understanding of the text that is as accurate as possible. Giving evidence of a broad command of the original language, it renders the original words into a second language understandably without deviating unnecessarily from the specific structure of the Hebrew. ... Every statement of language allows for a certain latitude in interpreting or translating. So the linguistic solution in any given case may be open to debate. But I have never discovered in the 'New World Translation' any biased intent to read something into the text that it does not contain." In 1993 Kedar-Kopfstein said that the NWT is one of his occasionally quoted reference works.

=== New Testament ===
Edgar J. Goodspeed, translator of the New Testament in An American Translation, positively evaluated the New World translation. According to the October 15, 1999 issue of The Watchtower, Goodspeed wrote to the Watch Tower Society in 1950 stating, "I am interested in the mission work of your people, and its world wide scope, and much pleased with the free, frank and vigorous translation. It exhibits a vast array of sound serious learning, as I can testify."

Steven T. Byington said in 1950, "Jehovah's Witnesses have made their own translation of the book for which they consider 'New Testament' an illegitimate name. It is well supplied with faults and merits." Byington reports that he agrees with the translation of some words and not others. Regarding the introduction of the name Jehovah instead of lord, Byington says: "fifteen pages of the preface present the arguments to justify this. I think the justification insufficient; but the 'Jehovah' does not shock a reader". He also says that the arrangement of the verse numbers escapes confusion "by making its verse numbers much lighter" and adds that "the use of a cheap quality of paper enables the publishers to cut the price below the already low price of the" Revised Standard Version. Byington concludes: "the book does not give enjoyable continuous reading; but if you are digging for excellent or suggestive renderings, this is among the richer mines."

In 1952, religious writer Alexander Thomson wrote of the New World Translation: "The translation is evidently the work of skilled and clever scholars, who have sought to bring out as much of the true sense of the Greek text as the English language is capable of expressing. ... We heartily recommend the New World Translation of the Christian Greek Scriptures, published in 1950 by the Watch Tower Bible and Tract Society." In 1959, Thomson added that on the whole the version was quite a good one, even though it was padded with many English words which had no equivalent in the Greek or Hebrew.

Allen Wikgren (member of the New Revised Standard Version committee, as well as the committee which produced the USB Greek text) said in 1952, "independent readings of merit often occur in other modern speech versions, such as Verkyl's New Testament (1945) and the Jehovah's Witnesses' edition of the New Testament (1950)".

In 1953, former American Bible Society board member Bruce M. Metzger stated that the translation was written to support Jehovah's Witness doctrines, with "several quite erroneous renderings of the Greek", and cited 6 examples (John 1:1, Col. 1:15-17, Phil. 2:6, Titus 2:13, 2 Pet. 1:1, and Rev. 3:14). In 1964, Metzger again reviewed the NWT and concluded, "on the whole, one gains a tolerably good impression of the scholarly equipment of the translators (their names are not divulged). They refer not only to modern translations [...] but to ancient translations as well. Frequently an intelligent use of a critical information is apparent". Metzger noted that the consistency in the decision to translate "the same Greek word by the same word in English as a specious show of faithfulness to the original tends to produce a certain woodenness, resulting in the distortion of the effect of the original". Metzger considered the rendering of Κύριος as Jehovah in the New World Translation to be indefensible: "Some of the translations which are simply indefensible include the following. The introduction of the word 'Jehovah' into the New Testament text". He added, "it is entirely without critical significance to be told that modern translations of the New Testament" render 'Lord' by the Tetragrammaton. Metzger also criticized the NWT's renderings of three verses: John 1:1 and Colossians 1:16, as in 1953, and adds Jude 11–15.

J. Carter Swaim in 1953 wrote that "objection is sometimes made to new translations on the ground that to abolish archaic phrases tends to cheapen the Scripture". Referring to the New World Translation of the Christian Greek Scriptures he added: "it is a translation that has its own peculiarities, and its own excellences too. The Witnesses, who are enthusiastic in the spread of their tenets, regard this as one of their most effective devices".

Theologian William Barclay concluded in 1953, "the deliberate distortion of truth by this sect is seen in their New Testament translations. John 1:1 is translated: '...the Word was a god,' a translation which is grammatically impossible... It is abundantly clear that a sect which can translate the New Testament like that is intellectually dishonest".

Frederick E. Mayer wrote in 1954: "It is a version that lends support to denial of doctrines which the Christian churches consider basic, such as the co-equality of Jesus Christ with the Father, the personhood of the Holy Spirit, and the survival of the human person after physical death. It teaches the annihilation of the wicked, the non-existence of hell, and the purely animal nature of man's soul."

In his review in Andover Newton Quarterly Robert M. McCoy reported in 1963: "in not a few instances the New World Translation contains passages which must be considered as 'theological translations.' This fact is particularly evident in those passages which express or imply the deity of Jesus Christ." He concludes: "The translation of the New Testament is evidence of the presence in the movement of scholars qualified to deal intelligently with the many problems of Biblical translation. This translation, as J. Carter Swaim observes, has its peculiarities and its excellences. All in all, it would seem that a reconsideration of the challenge of this movement to the historic churches is in order."

In 1963, theologian Anthony A. Hoekema wrote, "Their New World Translation of the Bible is by no means an objective rendering of the sacred text into modern English, but is a biased translation in which many of the peculiar teachings of the Watchtower Society are smuggled into the text of the Bible itself."

Samuel MacLean Gilmour said in 1966: "in 1950 the Jehovah's Witnesses published their New World Translation of The New Testament, and the preparation of the New World Old Testament translation is now far advanced. The New Testament translation was made by a committee whose membership has never been revealed—a committee that possessed an unusual competence in Greek and that made the Westcott and Hort Greek text basic to their translation. It is clear that doctrinal considerations influenced many turns of phrase, but the work is no crack-pot or pseudo-historical fraud".

In 1967, Robert H. Countess wrote that the "NWT has certain praiseworthy features—for example, an apparatus criticus—everyone must admit", but described the NWT's rendering of "a god" at John 1:1 as "most unfortunate for several reasons". In 1982, in his critical analysis The Jehovah's Witness' New Testament he wrote that the NWT "must be viewed as a radically biased piece of work. At some points it is actually dishonest. At others it is neither modern nor scholarly." Rolf Furuli, while a member of the denomination, responded, "Countess ascribes to the NWT translators rules for translation which they have never expressed, and then he shows inconsistently the translators have followed these rules [...] His account of the NWT, therefore, is not a balanced, scholarly presentation; rather, it surrenders both to emotionally inspired caricature and a partisan spirit". Jason BeDuhn notes that Countess, in discussing Titus 2:13, argues the NWT adds the preposition ‘of’ before ‘our Savior’ and describes it as an addition to the text (Countess 1982, page 69). BeDuhn says that this interpretation may not fully reflect the linguistic details involved, and that the phrase ‘our Savior’ appears in the genitive form, for which ‘of’ can be understood as part of its meaning.

Julius R. Mantey, the co-author of A Manual Grammar of the Greek New Testament and A Hellenistic Greek Reader, said in 1980 that the NWT's rendering of John 1:1 is "a shocking mistranslation" and "Obsolete and incorrect".

In 2003, theologians John Weldon and John Ankerberg reviewed the New World Translation, stating: "it is our goal in this article to briefly critique the English translation of the Jehovah's Witnesses' Watchtower Bible and Tract Society's The New World Translation of the Holy Scriptures (NWT)". Weldon and Ankerberg accused the New World Translation's translators of renderings that conform "to their own preconceived and unbiblical theology", citing several examples that they considered to support theological views in favor of accurate translation.

The 2003 edition of the New Catholic Encyclopedia states, "[Jehovah's Witnesses] are allowed no other books than the Bible and the society's own publications, which includes its own translation of the Bible with an impressive critical apparatus. The work is excellent except when scientific knowledge comes into conflict with the accepted doctrines of the movement. In their so-called New World Translation, the term Kyrios is rendered Jehovah instead of Lord everywhere in the New Testament (237 times) except at Philippians 2.11, where St. Paul refers the word to Christ."

In 2003, historian Jason BeDuhn examined New Testament passages in which he believed "bias is most likely to interfere with translation" from nine of "the Bibles most widely in use in the English-speaking world". BeDuhn compared the King James, the (New) Revised Standard, the New International, the New American Bible, the New American Standard Bible, the Amplified Bible, the Living Bible, Today's English and the NWT versions in Matthew 28:9, Philippians 2:6, Colossians 1:15–20, Titus 2:13, Hebrews 1:8, John 8:58, John 1:1. For each passage, he compared the Greek text with the renderings of each English translation, and looked for biased attempts to change the meaning. BeDuhn said that the New World Translation was "not bias free", adding that whilst the general public and various biblical scholars might assume that the differences in the New World Translation are the result of religious bias, he considered it to be "the most accurate of the translations compared", and a "remarkably good translation". He added that "most of the differences are due to the greater accuracy of the NW as a literal, conservative translation". Despite his positive review, BeDuhn said the introduction of the name "Jehovah" into the New Testament 237 times was "not accurate translation by the most basic principle of accuracy", and that it "violate[s] accuracy in favor of denominationally preferred expressions for God". In rebuttal, Thomas Howe strongly criticized BeDuhn's positive review of the New World Translation, stating that BeDuhn's main goal is to deny the deity of Christ. According to Howe, "in this critical evaluation, BeDuhn's arguments are challenged and his conclusions called into question".

In 2008, Kenneth J. Baumgarten and Kevin Gary Smith published an article in the South African Theological Seminary's journal, Conspectus, entitled, "An Examination of the Consistency of the New World Translation with the Stated Philosophy of the Translators", in which they studied the use of "the Greek term θεός in reference to Jesus Christ" and concluded that "in seven of the nine sample texts, the NWT violates one or more of its stated translation values and principles. They said the most common violation is its pervasive tendency to subvert the most natural understanding of the Greek text in favour of a 'preferred religious view'."

George D. Chryssides noted in 2016 that the New World Translation's rendering of passages about Christ's role in the creation of the world—for example, Colossians 1:15-17—are phrased in such a way as to suggest that Christ was created and not, as the Nicene Creed states, "begotten of the Father before all worlds, God of God."

=== Commentary about non-English versions ===
Cees Houtman wrote of the Dutch translation in 1984: "respect and knowledge are the requirements that a translator must meet. It was noted above that in the past distrust was often expressed regarding the translation work of persons belonging to a different modality or denomination and there was a fear of the theological points of view being reflected in the translation. A purely objective evaluation of translations, however, must conclude that only in very exceptional cases can passages be pointed out in which the confessional (or political and social) point of view of the translators shines through. Even the New World Translation of the Jehovah's Witnesses can survive the scrutiny of the critics. In this context, one should also note, for example, that Remonstrants and Mennonites were able to use the SV [(Statenvertaling)]. Scripture and religious beliefs tend to come to light in notes and introductions to translations."

The Evangelical German Bible Society reviewed the German-language edition of 1986 and described the NWT as a "translation that is accurate in many respects, but tendentious in the sense of the special teachings of Jehovah's Witnesses".

In 2003, the New World Translation has been included in analyses of modern Polish Bible translations published after 1945. In some comparisons, it has been rated higher than certain other Polish translations, including the Millennium Bible.

In 2004, Xabier Pikaza wrote of the Spanish translation, "Traducción del Nuevo Mundo ... is the name given by Jehovah's Witnesses to their version of the Bible, which is based on the conviction that the other versions, in all languages, are somehow tainted by the presuppositions of the various churches and Christian confessions. Only this version would reflect the exact content of the Scriptures in the original languages, because 'The Bible is the Word of God as long as it is well translated'. It is not a direct translation from the original languages, but is made from the English text (published in 1960), although the editors claim to have faithfully consulted the original Hebrew and Greek texts. The edition, in two columns, is very well cared for; it includes a critical apparatus and numerous intertextual references. Many Catholic and Protestant scholars have accused this Bible of flaws and biased interpretations. But, on the whole, it offers a reliable vision of the Word of God, which can lead men to the New World, that is, to the Messianic Kingdom".

Sverre Bøe in 2011 said, "the Norwegian version of The New World Translation of the Holy Scriptures (NWT) by Jehovah's Witnesses intends to be 'accurate', literal and precise, and in many respects it really is. A number of dogmatic concerns, however, break with such principles, often based on an anti-trinitarian understanding".

The 2014 publication of the New World Translation of the Holy Scriptures in Estonian was described by Rein Veidemann as "a great achievement" and was nominated by Kristiina Ross for the Language Deed of the Year Award. It was noted for its clarity and accuracy and was mentioned by linguists in discussions about Estonian translation work.

=== Kingdom Interlinear Translation of the Greek Scriptures ===
Thomas Nelson Winter considered the Kingdom Interlinear Translation of the Greek Scriptures to be a "highly useful aid toward the mastery of koine (and classical) Greek," adding that the translation "is thoroughly up-to-date and consistently accurate."

Julius R. Mantey stated that the KIT "changed the readings in scores of passages to state what Jehovah's Witnesses believe and teach. That is a distortion not a translation."

According to the February 1, 1998 issue of The Watchtower, Jason BeDuhn ordered copies of the KIT for his students at Indiana University Bloomington, and wrote that "it is the best interlinear New Testament available".

=== Controversial passages ===
Much criticism of the New World Translation involves the rendering of certain texts in the New Testament considered to be biased in favor of specific Witness practices and doctrines. These include:

- the use of "torture stake" instead of "cross" as the instrument of Jesus' crucifixion;
- the use of the indefinite article ("a") in its rendering of John 1:1 to give "the Word was a god";
- the term "public declaration" at Romans 10:10, which may reinforce the imperative to engage in public preaching;
- the term "coming to know" rather than merely "know" at John 17:3 (in the 2013 revision), which means that salvation is dependent on ongoing learning;
- the placement of the comma in Luke 23:43, which affects the timing of the fulfillment of Jesus' promise to the thief at Calvary.

Comment	NWT edition							
Verse	1950	1953-1960	1961	1970	1971	1984	2013	2015 —
Genesis 2:4		Haas						
Genesis 18:3		Haas						
Genesis 19:2		Haas						
Genesis 33:9		Bruce						
Exodus 4:10		Bruce						
Exodus 7:18		Bruce						
Zechariah 12:10						Stafford		
Matthew 2:1-2, 8, 11						BeDuhn		
Matthew 14:33						BeDuhn		
Matthew 18:26						BeDuhn		
Matthew 28:1							Andrews,	
Matthew 28:9						BeDuhn		
Matthew 28:16-17						BeDuhn		
Mark 15:18-19						BeDuhn		
John 1:1	Barclay, Baumgarten & Smith, Bruce, Countess, Mantey, Metzger			Baumgarten & Smith,		BeDuhn, Ehrman, Stafford		
John 1:18	Baumgarten & Smith,			Baumgarten & Smith,				
John 8:58						BeDuhn,	Andrews,	
John 20:28	Baumgarten & Smith,			Baumgarten & Smith,				
Acts 20:28	Baumgarten & Smith,					Stafford		
Romans 9:5	Baumgarten & Smith,			Baumgarten & Smith,				
Philippians 2:5–11						BeDuhn		
Colossians 1:15–20	Chryssides, Metzger					BeDuhn, Byatt & Flemings, Stafford		
Colossians 2:9						Stafford		
1 Thessalonians 4:3-6						BeDuhn		
Titus 2:13	Baumgarten & Smith,			Baumgarten & Smith,		BeDuhn, Stafford		
Hebrews 1:8	Baumgarten & Smith,			Baumgarten & Smith,		BeDuhn, Stafford		
2 Peter 1:1-2	Baumgarten & Smith,			Baumgarten & Smith,		BeDuhn		
1 John 5:20	Baumgarten & Smith,							
Revelation 3:9						BeDuhn		

== Prohibitions ==
=== Russia ===
The New World Translation, along with the Jehovah's Witnesses organization, was banned in Russia in 2017, after the prosecution used quotes from Wikipedia to argue that the translation is extremist and not a true Bible. This decision was questioned by international observers, and even by Alexander Dvorkin, who had previously asked for the Jehovah's Witnesses' organization to be banned.

== See also ==
- Jehovah's Witnesses publications
- List of Bible translations by language
