= Martin Pötzinger =

- Born: Martin Pötzinger; July 25, 1904; Munich, German Empire
- Died: June 16, 1988 (aged 83); New York, United States of America
- Occupation: Jehovah's Witnesses governing body member
- Known for: Victim of religious persecution in Nazi Germany
- Spouse: Gertrud Mende (m. 1936)

Martin Pötzinger (July 25, 1904–June 16, 1988) was a German orthopaedic shoemaker, missionary and member of the Governing Body of Jehovah's Witnesses. He was persecuted for his beliefs in Nazi Germany.

== Life ==
On October 2, 1928, he became a Bible Student as Jehovah's Witnesses were then called. On October 1, 1930, he became a pioneer. He preached in Bavaria. In the fall of 1933, the Watch Tower Society entrusted him with oversight of Jehovah's Witnesses in Bulgaria. In 1934, he moved to Hungary. He then led a group of pioneers in Yugoslavia and Czechoslovakia.

After a long illness, he returned to Germany. In 1936, he married Gertrud Mende. That same year, for his membership in Jehovah's Witnesses and his refusal to renounce his faith, he was imprisoned in the Dachau concentration camp, and later in the Mauthausen-Gusen concentration camp. He served nine years in the concentration camps. His wife was caught delivering Bible literature to fellow believers and was sentenced to three and a half years in prison, which she served in Dresden. After serving her sentence, she refused to sign a declaration ceasing contact with Jehovah's Witnesses, and was sent to Ravensbrück concentration camp.

In 1945, after his release, he became a circuit overseer in Germany and, together with his wife, Gertrud (d. 2003), visited congregations. In 1958, he became a student in the 32nd class of the Watchtower Bible School of Gilead. His life story was published in The Watchtower in 1969. In 1977, he and his wife served at Bethel in Wiesbaden, Germany. In September 1977, he became a member of the Governing Body at the world headquarters of Jehovah's Witnesses in New York. Until his death, he served on the Service Committee.

In 1985, Pötzinger publicly testified to his experiences in a letter published by The New York Times, highlighting the persecution of Jehovah’s Witnesses under the Nazi regime and their refusal to compromise their religious conscience.

== See also ==
- Persecution of Jehovah's Witnesses in Nazi Germany
- Governing Body of Jehovah's Witnesses
- August Dickmann

== Bibliography ==
- Christoph Wilker: Pötzinger, Martin and Gertrud (published on January 16, 2025), in: nsdoku.lexikon , ed. by the NS Documentation Center Munich, URL: https://www.nsdoku.de/lexikon/artikel/poetzinger-martin-und-gertrud-656
- Hesse, Hans, ed. (2001). Persecution and Resistance of Jehovah's Witnesses During the Nazi-Regime. Berghahn Series (illustrated ed.). Berghahn Books. ISBN 9783861087502.
