= Rolf Furuli =

Norwegian linguist (born 1942)

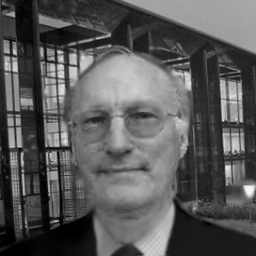
- Born: Rolf Johan Furuli; 19 December 1942 (age 83); Oslo, Norway
- Occupations: University teacher, translator, writer
- Title: Emeritus
- Spouse: Anne-Sissel (d. 2023)

Academic background
- Education: University of Oslo (MA, DA)
- Thesis: A New Understanding of the Verbal System of Classical Hebrew—An Attempt to Distinguish Between Pragmatic and Semantic Factors (2005)

Academic work
- Discipline: Linguism
- Sub-discipline: Semitic languages
- Institutions: University of Oslo, The Norwegian Institute of Paleography and Historical Philology
- Main interests: Vav-consecutive, Modern Hebrew verbs, Bible translations, New World Translation of the Holy Scriptures, Tetragrammaton

Signature
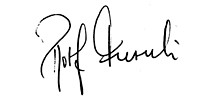

Rolf Johan Furuli (born 19 December 1942) is a Norwegian linguist who was a lecturer in Semitic languages at the University of Oslo; he retired in 2011. Furuli has taught courses of Akkadian, Aramaic, Ethiopic, Hebrew, Phoenician, Syriac, and Ugaritic at the University of Oslo and at The Norwegian Institute of Paleography and Historical Philology.

== Life ==
=== Education ===
Furuli started his studies of New Babylonian chronology in 1984. In 1995 he graduated from the University of Oslo with a Master of Arts degree, with a thesis on the system of verbs in classical Hebrew. In 2005 he received his Doctor of Arts with a thesis on definite and indefinite verbs in the Hebrew Bible. In 2005, Furuli defended his doctoral thesis suggesting a new understanding of verbal system of Classical Hebrew.

In a review of the thesis, professor Elisabeth R. Hayes of Wolfson College, Oxford, wrote: "While not all will agree with Furuli's conclusions regarding the status of the wayyiqtol as an imperfective form, his well-argued thesis contributes towards advancing methodology in Hebrew scholarship." Old Testament lecturer David Kummerow stated that Furuli's research "has gone astray in that his methodology has assumed too much", adding that "the value of Furuli's research is not to be found in his 'new understanding' but rather in the helpful extended cataloguing of non-prototypical and construction-dependent functions of the verbal conjugations of [biblical Hebrew]". Professor John A. Kaltner said:

Semantic considerations have long dominated in treatments of the Hebrew verbal system, and Furuli's call to take into account pragmatic factors is an important one that is worth considering. How his alternative model will be received remains to be seen, but at the very least his work might encourage some to think of more than just semantics when trying to understand the Hebrew verb.

=== Teaching ===
From 1999 Furuli held a position as assistant professor at the University of Oslo, before retiring in 2011.

=== Religious affiliation ===
Furuli was a Jehovah's Witness and served as an elder for 56 years, also holding positions as a circuit overseer and a district overseer.

==== Disfellowshipping ====
In 2020, Furuli published a book entitled My Beloved Religion—and the Governing Body in which he maintains that the denomination's core doctrines and interpretations of biblical chronology are correct, but challenges the authority of the Jehovah's Witnesses' leadership. Furuli argued that recent Watch Tower publications rely less on scholarly biblical analysis and more on subjective interpretation. He also criticized the organization's centralization of control over congregation real estate, construction, and financial management. Subsequently, on 17 June 2020 he was disfellowshipped from the denomination.

== Religious views ==
Furuli has defended the religious views of Jehovah's Witnesses, including their view that Jerusalem was destroyed by the Babylonians in 607 BC rather than the broadly recognised dating of its destruction in 587 BC. In response, in a 2004 issue of Journal for the Study of the Old Testament, Lester L. Grabbe, professor of Hebrew Bible and Early Judaism at the University of Hull, said of Furuli's study: "Once again we have an amateur who wants to rewrite scholarship. ... F. shows little evidence of having put his theories to the test with specialists in Mesopotamian astronomy and Persian history."

== Works ==
Furuli has written works about Bible translation and biblical issues. He has translated a number of documents from Semitic languages and Sumerian into Norwegian.

=== Theses ===
- Furuli, Rolf (1995). Imperfect Consecutive and the Verbal System of Biblical Hebrew (Master of Arts). University of Oslo. (362 pages).
- ——— (2006). A New Understanding of the Verbal System of Classical Hebrew—An Attempt to Distinguish Between Pragmatic and Semantic Factors. Oslo: Awatu Publishers. (Doctor of Arts). University of Oslo. ISBN 82-994633-4-3. OCLC 123503008. (504 pages).

=== Books ===
- Furuli, Rolf (1997). "The Problem of Induction and the Hebrew verb". In Wardini, Elie (ed.). Built on Solid Rock: Studies in Honour of Professor Ebbe Egede Knudsen on the Occasion of His 65th Birthday, April 11th 1997. Institutt for sammenliknende kulturforskning. Serie B. Oslo: Novus forlag. pp. 82–90. ISBN 82-7099-283-6. OCLC 469681495.
- ——— (1999). The Role of Theology and Bias in Bible Translation with a Special Look at the New World Translation of Jehovah's Witnesses. Elihu Books. ISBN 0-9659814-4-4. (334 pages).
- ——— (2002). Vitenskap og Bibeloversettelse – "Kristianisering" og "Mytologisering" av Bibelens hebraiske tekst [Science and Bible Translation – "Christianizing" and "Mythologizing" of the Hebrew Text of the Bible] (in Norwegian and Danish). R. Furuli. ISBN 82-994633-1-9. (201 pages).
- ——— (2003). Persian Chronology and the Length of the Babylonian Exile of the Jews. Assyrian, Babylonian, Egyptian, and Persian Chronology Compared with the Chronology of the Bible. Vol. 1. ISBN 82-994633-3-5. (251 pages)
- ——— (2004). "The NWT's translation of the Hebrew verbal system with particular stress on the waw consecutive". In Byatt, Anthony; Flemings, Hal (eds.). 'Your Word is Truth': Essays in Celebration of the 50th Anniversary of the New World Translation of the Holy Scriptures (1950, 1953). Golden Age Books. pp. 221–241. ISBN 0-9506212-6-9.
- ——— (2005). "The Verbal System of Classical Hebrew: An Attempt to Distinguish Between Semantic and Pragmatic Factors". In Edzard, Lutz; Retsø, Jan (eds.). Current Issues in the Analysis of Semitic Grammar and Lexicon I. Otto Harrassowitz Verlag. pp. 205–231. ISBN 3-447-05268-6.
- ——— (2007). "The Neo-Babylonian Chronology and the Cuneiform Tablet VAT 4956". Forschung – Bibel – Artefakte. Research – Bible – Artifacts. Gersam Verlag. pp. XIV–XVIII. ISBN 978-3-9811529-2-0.
- ——— (2007). Assyrian, Babylonian and Egyptian Chronology. Assyrian, Babylonian, Egyptian, and Persian Chronology Compared with the Chronology of the Bible. Vol. 2. ISBN 978-82-994633-6-2. (370 pages).
- ——— (2008). Persian Chronology and the Length of the Babylonian Exile of the Jews. Assyrian, Babylonian, Egyptian, and Persian Chronology Compared with the Chronology of the Bible. Vol. 1 (revised ed.). ISBN 978-82-994633-5-5. (376 pages).
- ——— (2009). "Hvordan tenker Jehovas vitner? Et vitne beskriver troen [How do Jehovah's Witnesses think? A Witness describes the faith]". In Ringnes, H. K.; Sødal, H. K. (eds.). Jehovas vitner: En Flerfaglig Studie [Jehovah's Witnesses: An Interdisciplinary Study] (in Norwegian). Universitetsforlaget. pp. 156–166. ISBN 978-82-15-01453-1.
- ——— (2011). The Role of Theology and Bias in Bible Translation with a Special Look at the New World Translation of Jehovah's Witnesses (Second ed.). Stavern, Norway: Awatu Publishers. ISBN 978-82-92978-02-3. (475 pages).
- ——— (2012). Persian Chronology and the Length of the Babylonian Exile of the Jews. Assyrian, Babylonian, Egyptian, and Persian Chronology Compared with the Chronology of the Bible. Vol. 1 (Second ed.). ISBN 978-82-92978-03-0. (413 pages).
- ——— (2013). Assyrian, Babylonian and Egyptian Chronology. Assyrian, Babylonian, Egyptian, and Persian Chronology Compared with the Chronology of the Bible. Vol. 2 (Second ed.). ISBN 978-82-92978-04-7. (502 pages).
- ——— (2017). When Was the Book of Daniel Written? A Philological, Linguistic, and Historical Approach. Awatu Publisher. ISBN 978-82-92978-06-1.
- ——— (2018). The Tetragram—Its History, Its Use in the New Testament, and Its Pronunciation. ISBN 978-82-92978-09-2. (250 pages).
- ——— (2019). Can We Trust the Bible? With Focus on the Creation Account, the Worldwide Flood, and the Prophecies (EPUB). ISBN 978-82-92978-07-8. (1550 pages).
- ——— (2020). The Fallacy of Prophetic Perfect – With Translation of Verses From the Prophets. ISBN 978-82-92978-10-8. (363 pages).
- ——— (2020). My Beloved Religion – and the Governing Body. ISBN 978-82-92978-12-2.

=== Articles ===
- Furuli, Rolf (2000). "Modern models and the study of dead languages". Motskrift (in Norwegian). Trondheim: Institutt for nordistikk og litteraturvitenskap, Norges teknisk-naturvitenskapelige universitet (NTNU): 83–86.
- ———; Groenewald, Leon; Nerdrum, Johan (2001). "The study of new religious movements with a stress on the mental health of Jehovah's Witnesses". Tidsskrift for Norsk Psykologforening (in Norwegian). 2: 123–128.

=== Translations ===
- Gilgamesh og Atrahasis: To babylonske helter [Gilgamesh and Atrahasis: Two Babylonian Heroes]. Translated by Furuli, Rolf; Bringsværd, Tor Åge; Braarvig, Jens. 2001. (translated from Akkadian into Norwegian).
- ——— (2003). Enoks Bok [The Book of Enoch] (in Norwegian). De Norske Bokklubbene. ISBN 82-525-5177-7. OCLC 66565269. (translated from Ge'ez into Norwegian)
- ——— (2004). Dødehavsrullene : i norsk oversettelse av Anders Aschim, Torleif Elgvin, Rolf Furuli, Gunnar Haaland, Årstein Justnes en Hans Kvalbein [The Dead Sea Scrolls: a translation by Anders Aschim, Torleif Elgvin, Rolf Furuli, Gunnar Haaland, Årstein Justnes and Hans Kvalbein]. Norske bokklubbene. ISBN 82-525-5199-8. OCLC 71725949. (translated from Hebrew and Aramaic into Norwegian)
- ——— (2006). Sumeriske Skrifter [Sumerian Writings]. Bokklubben. ISBN 82-525-6213-2. (translated from Sumerian into Norwegian)
- ——— (2008). Kebra Nagast. ISBN 978-82-525-6704-5. (translated from Ge'ez into Norwegian)
- ——— (2008). Baal Gudenes konge i Ugarit [Baal the King of the Gods in Ugarit]. ISBN 978-82-525-6590-4. (translated from Ugaritic, Phoenician, and Hebrew into Norwegian)

== See also ==
- Atra-Hasis
- Bible chronology
- Book of Enoch
- Dead Sea Scrolls
- Egyptian chronology
- Gilgamesh
- Hebrew verb conjugation
- New World Translation of the Holy Scriptures
- Waw-consecutive

== Sources ==
- "Rolf Furuli. University of Oslo, Department of Culture Studies and Oriental Languages, Emeritus". Academia.edu.
- Bøe, Sverre (2011). "The New World Bible Translation of Jehovah's Witnesses". Tidsskrift for Teologi og Kirke (in Norwegian). Oslo, Norway: 170.
- Chryssides, George D. (2016). Jehovah's Witnesses: Continuity and Change. Routledge New Religions. Routledge. p. 20. ISBN 9781351925426.
- Chryssides, George D. (2022). Jehovah's Witnesses: A New Introduction. Bloomsbury Publishing. ISBN 9781350190900.
- Edzard, Lutz; Retsö, Jan, eds. (2005). Current issues in the analysis of Semitic grammar and lexicon. Otto Harrassowitz Verlag. ISBN 9783447052689.
- Flemings, Hal (2008). Examining Criticisms of the Bible. AuthorHouse. p. 89. ISBN 978-1-4343-2803-8.
- Furuli, Rolf (2001). "Rapid Response: Bioethical aspects of the recent changes in the policy of refusal of blood by Jehovah's Witnesses". BMJ (Clinical Research Ed.). 322 (7277): 37–9. doi:10.1136/bmj.322.7277.37. PMC 1119307. PMID 11141155. "As a member of the hospital liaison committee in Oslo, Norway for the last ten years the question about medical ethics and the use of blood is very important for me."
- Grabbe, Lester L. (2004). "FURULI, ROLF, Persian Chronology and the Length of the Babylonian Exile of the Jews Assyrian, Babylonian, Egyptian and Persian Chronology Compared with the Chronology of the Bible, 1 (Oslo: R. Furuli A/S [furuli@online.no], 2003), pp. 251. n.p. ISBN 82-994633-3-5". Journal for the Study of the Old Testament. 28 (5): 42–43. ISSN 0309-0892.
- Eidsvåg, Gunnar Magnus (5 June 2012). "Rolf Furuli: The Role of Theology and Bias in Bible Translation: With a Special Look at the New World Translation of Jehovahs Witnesses". Teologisk Tidsskrift. 1 (1): 214–216. doi:10.18261/ISSN1893-0271-2012-02-09.
- Hayes, Elizabeth R. (2007). "A New Understanding of the Verbal System of Classical Hebrew: An Attempt to Distinguish between Semantic and Pragmatic Factors (review)". Hebrew Studies. 48. National Association of Professors of Hebrew (NAPH): 359–362. doi:10.1353/hbr.2007.0013. ISSN 2158-1681. S2CID 143302352.
- House, Mark A. (8 November 2016). "Review of Rolf J. Furuli, The Role of Theology and Bias in Bible Translation With a Special Look at the New World Translation of Jehovah's Witnesses". Christian Publishing House.
- Jonsson, Carl Olof (2004). The Gentile Times Reconsidered – Chronology and Christ's Return. Commentary Press, Atlanta.
- Kaltner, J. (2008). "A New Understanding of the Verbal System of Classical Hebrew: An Attempt to Distinguish between Semantic and Pragmatic Factors". Review of Biblical Literature. 10: 88. ISSN 1099-0046.
- Lang, Bernhard (2009). International Review of Biblical Studies, Volume 54 (2007-2008). BRILL. pp. 300–301. ISBN 9789047426011.
- Muramoto, Osamu (2001). "Rapid Response: Bioethical aspects of the recent changes in the policy of refusal of blood by Jehovah's Witnesses". BMJ (Clinical Research Ed.). 322 (7277): 37–9. doi:10.1136/bmj.322.7277.37. PMC 1119307. PMID 11141155.
- "Rolf Furuli". ResearchGate.
- UbO. "rolffu". Universitetsbiblioteket i Oslo. Archived from the original on 30 November 2011.
