= Faithful and discreet slave =

Terminology used by Jehovah's Witnesses

The "faithful and discreet slave" is a term used by Jehovah's Witnesses to describe those whom they believe have been appointed by Jesus Christ to provide spiritual instruction to his followers. The concept is based on their interpretation of the Parable of the Faithful Servant as recorded in Matthew 24:45–47, Mark 13:34–37, and Luke 12:35–48.

Since 2012, Jehovah's Witnesses have identified the "faithful and discreet slave" as the denomination's Governing Body, a small group of anointed men at their world headquarters who are said to act collectively under the direction of Jesus Christ. In this role, the Governing Body exercises teaching authority in all matters of doctrine and belief.

The "faithful and discreet slave" doctrine is a central element of Jehovah's Witnesses' belief system and has undergone several major reinterpretations since it was first introduced by Charles Taze Russell in 1881.

== Role ==
Watch Tower Society publications teach that Jesus uses the faithful and discreet slave "to publish information on the fulfillment of Bible prophecies and to give timely direction on the application of Bible principles in daily life" as the only means of communicating God's messages to humans. It is referred to as God's "prophet" and "channel", and claims to provide "divine" direction and guidance. Jehovah's Witnesses are taught that living in accordance with God's will and maintaining a close relationship with God involves listening carefully to the guidance given by the slave class.

Governing Body members are said to act in the role of the faithful and discreet slave class when arriving at decisions on doctrines, activities, and oversight of Jehovah's Witnesses worldwide, including making appointments to positions of responsibility.

== Doctrinal evolution ==
=== Early interpretations (1881–1916) ===
In 1881, an article in Zion's Watch Tower and Herald of Christ's Presence by the magazine's editor Charles Taze Russell identified the "faithful and wise servant" as "that 'little flock' of consecrated servants who are faithfully carrying out their consecration vows—the body of Christ ... the whole body individually and collectively, giving the meat in due season to the household of faith—the great company of believers."

In 1895, Russell's wife Maria claimed that Russell himself was the figure referred to in the parable at Matthew 24:45-47, though Russell initially declined to accept the personal application of the title, suggesting that it should apply to the Watch Tower rather than its editor. In 1897 Russell agreed that Christ would have made a "choice of one channel for dispensing the meat in due season [emphasis in the original]" and while he did not refer to that "one channel" as an individual, Russell did apply to it the personal pronoun "he" (for example: "if unfaithful he will be deposed entirely"), and noted "whoever the Lord will so use, as a truth-distributing agent, will be very humble and unassuming" and "he would not think of claiming authorship or ownership of the truth."

In 1909, in an unsigned article, the Watch Tower mentioned that the "application to us of Matthew 24:45" had come "some fourteen years ago", or about 1895. The article went on to say "the Society's literature was the channel through which the Lord sent them practically all that they know about the Bible and the Divine purposes."

The prevailing view among Bible Students that Russell was "the faithful and wise servant" of Jesus' parable, was reiterated in the Watch Tower a few weeks after Russell's death in 1916:

Thousands of the readers of Pastor Russell's writings believe that he filled the office of "that faithful and wise servant," and that his great work was giving to the Household of Faith meat in due season. His modesty and humility precluded him from openly claiming this title, but he admitted as much in private conversation.

The Watch Tower Society's official history of Jehovah's Witnesses states that Russell "did not personally promote the idea, but he did acknowledge the apparent reasonableness of the arguments of those who favored it."

=== Post-Russell shift (1917–1927) ===
In 1917, the publisher's preface to the book, The Finished Mystery, issued as a posthumous publication of Russell's writings, identified him as the "faithful and wise servant" appointed by Christ; as late as 1923, the Watch Tower repeated the same belief about his role, declaring: "We believe that all who are now rejoicing in present truth will concede that Brother Russell faithfully filled the office of special servant of the Lord; and that he was made ruler over all the Lord's goods ... Brother Russell occupied the office of that 'faithful and wise servant'."

In 1927, Watch Tower Society president Joseph Rutherford reverted to Russell's original viewpoint, announcing that the "servant" was not an individual, but was made up of the entire body of faithful spirit-anointed Christians.

=== Organizational clarifications (1927–1999) ===
A 1950 issue of The Watchtower appeared to assign to the "mother organization"—in reference to the Watch Tower Society—the task of feeding Christians "meat in due season"; in 1951 the magazine defined the "faithful and discreet slave" as a class of people whose teachings were imparted through a theocratic organization.

Watch Tower Society publications had taught that the "faithful and discreet slave" class had had a continuous uninterrupted existence since being appointed by Christ at the time of Pentecost AD 33, when the first 120 people upon whom Holy Spirit was poured out began "feeding" Jews with spiritual food. As new disciples came in, they filled the role of "domestics" and joined in feeding others. The Apostles and other early Christian disciples who wrote the books of the New Testament were also part of the "slave" class providing spiritual food to Christians.

The Watchtower claimed members of the "slave" class were a close-knit body of Christians rather than isolated, independent individuals, and that one generation of the "slave" class fed the succeeding generation to maintain the unbroken line for more than 1900 years, providing the same spiritual food to Christians worldwide. Watch Tower publications did not identify the groups filling the role of the "slave" class between the close of the Apostolic Age and the early 20th century, suggesting it disappeared from "clear view", but they implied they might have included the Lollards and the Waldensians (the latter movement described by The Watchtower as "faithful witnesses of Jehovah ... who sought to revive true worship of Christianity").

=== Modern redefinition (2000–present) ===
Beginning in the early 2000s, The Watchtower increasingly described the Governing Body as the representative and "spokesman" for the "faithful and discreet slave class"—a term that had long referred collectively to all anointed Jehovah's Witnesses. In fact, although thousands of Jehovah's Witnesses profess to be of the "anointed" class, the Governing Body has stated that it does not maintain a worldwide network of anointed ones nor consult them on doctrinal matters. While the Governing Body had long asserted its authority to formulate doctrine on behalf of the anointed, by 2009 The Watchtower clarified that "not all individuals of the slave class have the same responsibilities or work assignments," stating that only "a limited number" were involved in that work at the denomination's world headquarters.

This shift culminated at the denomination's Annual Meeting on October 6, 2012, when the Governing Body announced a redefinition of the "faithful and discreet slave." No longer understood to refer to all anointed Witnesses, the term was redefined to apply only to the Governing Body itself—specifically when acting collectively in their role of providing spiritual instruction. The announcement also revised the understanding of the parable's "domestics," previously believed to be limited to individual anointed Witnesses, to now include all Jehovah's Witnesses.

Additionally, the timing of the "slave's" appointment by Christ was clarified. Rather than being appointed during the first century, as earlier interpretations suggested, the appointment was now said to have occurred in 1919—following Jesus' invisible return, which Witnesses believe began in 1914.

Following the 2012 clarification, the terms "faithful and discreet slave" and "Governing Body" became functionally synonymous in Jehovah's Witnesses' teachings and publications. The responsibility for interpreting scripture and dispensing "spiritual food" rests solely with the Governing Body.

== Criticism ==
Following his expulsion from the organization in 1981, former Governing Body member Raymond Franz claimed the description of the slave in the parable as a "class" of Christians was unsupported by scripture and was used to emphasize the concept of the slave being connected to an organization, diminishing its application to individuals in encouraging the qualities of faith, discretion, watchfulness, and individual responsibility. He argued that if the application of figures in Jesus' corresponding parables as members of a class were consistent, there would also be a "ten-mina class" and "five-mina class" relating to Luke 19:12–27 and a "many strokes class" and "few strokes class" arising from Luke 12: 47–48.

Franz claimed the leadership employs its interpretation of the "faithful and discreet slave" parable primarily to support the concept of centralized administrative authority in order to exercise control over members of the group by demanding their loyalty and submission. He said the "anointed" remnant, which at that time was claimed to comprise the "slave" class, had negligible input into Watch Tower Society doctrine and direction, which were set by the Governing Body.

Franz also argued that the Watch Tower Society and its doctrines were built on the independent Bible study of its founder, Charles Taze Russell, who neither consulted any existing "faithful and discreet slave" class for enlightenment nor believed in the concept taught by the Society. He concluded: "In its efforts to deny that Jesus Christ is now dealing, or would ever deal, with individuals apart from an organization, a unique 'channel', the teaching produces an untenable position. It claims that Christ did precisely that in dealing with Russell as an individual apart from any organization." Franz also claimed that Jehovah's Witnesses' official history book, Jehovah's Witnesses—Proclaimers of God's Kingdom, misrepresented Russell's view of the "faithful steward" by emphasizing his initial 1881 view that it was the entire body of Christ, without mentioning that he altered his view 14 years later.

== See also ==
- Jehovah's Witnesses beliefs
- Eschatology of Jehovah's Witnesses
- Organizational structure of Jehovah's Witnesses
- New World Translation of the Holy Scriptures
- 144,000
