= Anthony Byatt =

English writer (1928–2014)

- Born: 23 February 1928; London, UK
- Died: 17 September 2014 (aged 86)
- Occupations: Bible collector; postcard publisher; photographer; antiquarian; publisher; editor; writer
- Organizations: Golden Age Books; International Society of Bible Collectors (ISBC)
- Movement: Jehovah's Witnesses
- Spouse: Sue
- Children: 2
- Website: goldenagebooks.org

Anthony "Tony" Byatt (23 February 1928 – 17 September 2014) was an English postcard publisher, photographer and writer. Byatt's works cover a broad range of subjects: reproduction of historical photographs and picture postcards, Bible translation, New Testament metaphors, water systems and population of Jerusalem, human body and clothing.

== Life ==
=== Private life ===
Byatt and his wife had two daughters.

=== Religious activity ===
Byatt joined Jehovah's Witnesses in c. 1939, and he was appointed to special service within the denomination by 1956. Apart from preaching, his activity included collecting books for the library of the Watchtower Bible School of Gilead with future Governing Body member Albert Schroeder.

=== Golden Age Books ===
Byatt directed the publishing company Golden Age Books, which was based at his residency in Malvern. Byatt had been an antiquarian bookseller since 1981 and Golden Age Books also dealt in second-hand literature.

== Writings ==
He published a book on the interpretation of New Testament metaphors in 1995.

In 2004, Byatt and other Jehovah's Witness writers published the anthology 'Your Word is Truth', Essays in Celebration of the 50th Anniversary of the New World Translation of the Holy Scriptures (1950, 1953), which included essays defending the New World Translation against criticism from non-Witnesses and a bibliography of works on the translation. While most doctrines defended by Byatt continue to be accepted by Jehovah's Witnesses, some of the views have been retracted by the organization in the course of more scholarship.

As a member of the International Society of Bible Collectors (ISBC), Byatt was an Associate Editor of The Bible Collector, changed to Bible Collectors' World in 1985.

== Bibliography ==
=== Books ===
- Byatt, Anthony (1974). Picture Postcards and Their Publishers: An Illustrated Account Identifying Britain's Major Postcard Publishers 1894 to 1939 and the Great Variety of Cards They Issued. London: Golden Age Postcard Books. ISBN 978-0-9506212-0-3. OCLC 641778625.
- ———— (1982). Collecting Picture Postcards: An Introduction. Malvern, Worcestershire: Golden Age Postcard Books. ISBN 978-0-9506212-1-0.
- ———— (1995). New Testament Metaphors: Illustrations in Word and Phrase. The Pentland Press. ISBN 978-1-85821-239-5.
- ———— (1997). Building a Theocratic Library. Malvern, Worcestershire: Golden Age Books. ISBN 978-0-95062-123-4.
- ————; Flemings, Hal, eds. (2004). 'Your Word Is Truth', Essays in Celebration of the 50th Anniversary of the New World Translation of the Holy Scriptures (1950, 1953). Malvern, Worcestershire: Golden Age Books. ISBN 978-0-95062-126-5.
- ———— (2012). Reminiscences Towards a History of Jehovah's Witness in London–1881 to 1977. Exeter: Golden Age Books. ISBN 978-0-95577-504-8.

=== Articles ===
- Byatt, Anthony (1973). "Josephus and Population Numbers in First Century Palestine". Palestine Exploration Quarterly. 105 (1): 51–60. doi:10.1179/peq.1973.105.1.51.
- ———— (1984). "Daniel Mace's New Testament". The Bible Collector. 20 (78).
- ———— (1987). "Handling The Tetragrammaton In English Translations". Bible Collectors' World. 3 (4): 3–8. ISSN 0883-9204.
- ———— (1989). "The Holy Spirit - A Further Examination". The Expository Times. 100 (6): 215–216. doi:10.1177/001452468910000605. eISSN 1745-5308. ISSN 0014-5246.
- ———— (2005-09-17). "Response to Lynn Lundquist's Criticisms". OnlyTrueGod.org.
