= The Kingdom Interlinear Translation of the Greek Scriptures =

1969 edition of the Bible

The Kingdom Interlinear Translation
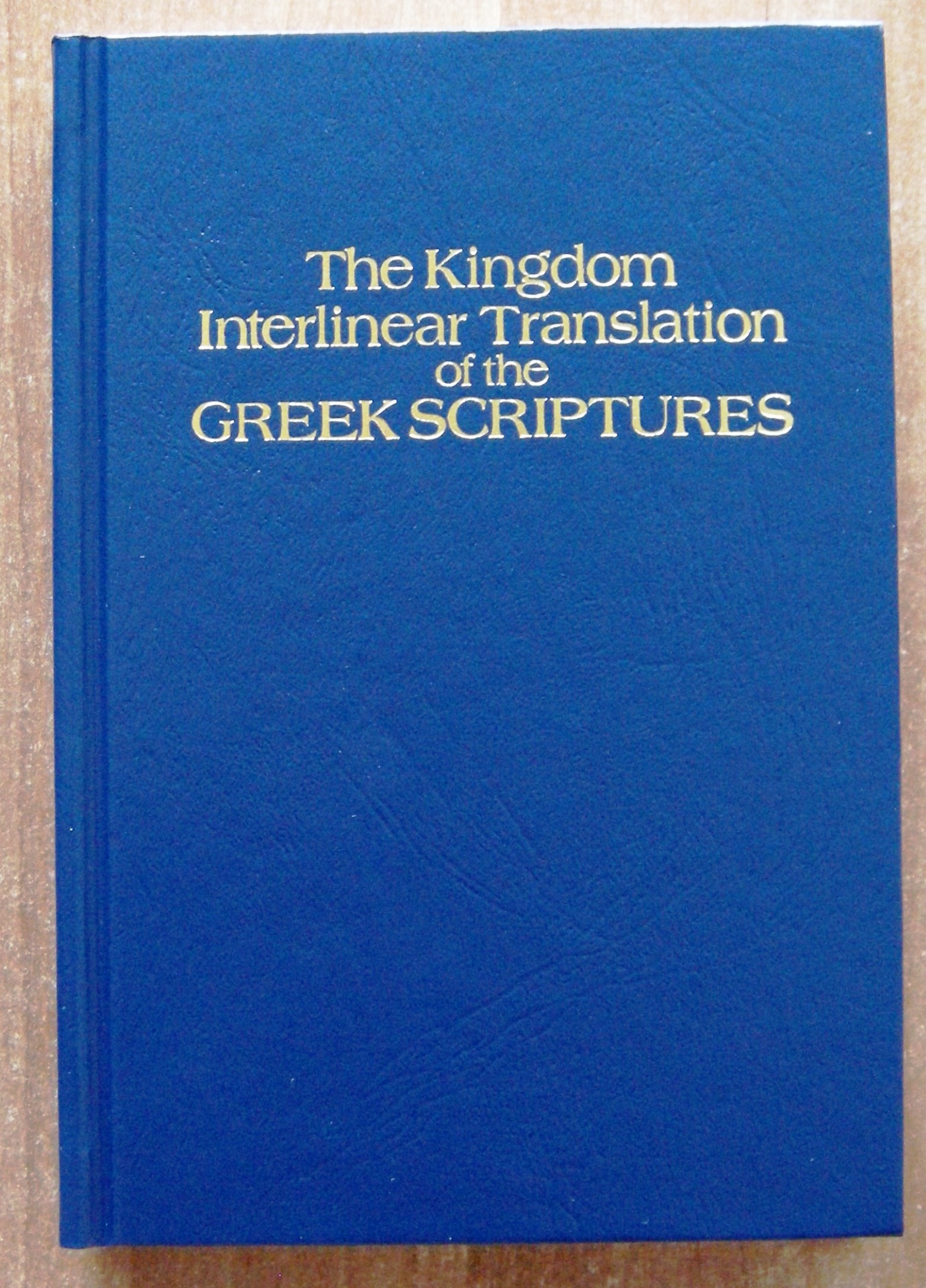
- The Kingdom Interlinear Translation
- Full name: The Kingdom Interlinear Translation of the Greek Scriptures
- Abbreviation: KIT
- Language: English, Koine Greek
- NT published: 1969, 1985
- Authorship: B. F. Westcott; F. J. A. Hort; New World Bible Translation Committee (Anonymous)
- Derived from: The New Testament in the Original Greek, as compiled by B. F. Westcott and F. J. A. Hort. 1881
- Translation type: Interlinear, Formal Equivalence and Dynamic.
- Revision: 1985
- Publisher: Watchtower Bible and Tract Society of New York, Inc.
- Copies printed: ca. 800.000
- Website: The Kingdom Interlinear Translation of the Greek Scriptures on jw.org

The Kingdom Interlinear Translation of the Greek Scriptures is an interlinear translation of the New Testament, published by the Watchtower Bible and Tract Society of New York, Inc. and translated by the New World Bible Translation Committee. The first edition was released at an international convention of Jehovah's Witnesses in 1969. As of the 1985 revision, 800,000 copies were produced.

== Contents ==
The interlinear provides Brooke Foss Westcott and Fenton John Anthony Hort's The New Testament in the Original Greek, published in 1881, with a Watchtower-supplied literal translation under each Greek word. An adjacent column provides the text of the Watch Tower Society's New World Translation of the Holy Scriptures.

Marginal notes refer to various biblical manuscripts and Bible translations. Various appendices provide information about the Greek alphabet and prepositions, maps of Palestine in the first century, and information about editorial decisions relating to the text of the New World Translation. A characteristic of this translation is that the name Jehovah was inserted in the citations to the Hebrew scriptures in which the tetragrammaton is found.

== Reception ==
Thomas Nelson Winter, an instructor of Greek at the University of Nebraska–Lincoln and former president of the Unitarian Church of Lincoln, considered The Kingdom Interlinear Translation of the Greek Scriptures to be a "highly useful aid toward the mastery of koine (and classical) Greek"

Julius R. Mantey stated that the KIT "changed the readings in scores of passages to state what Jehovah's Witnesses believe and teach. That is a distortion not a translation."

According to the February 1, 1998 issue of The Watchtower, Jason BeDuhn ordered copies of the KIT for his students at Indiana University Bloomington, and wrote that "it is the best interlinear New Testament available".
