= George D. Gangas =

George Demetrius Gangas
- Member of the Governing Body of Jehovah's Witnesses
- Church: Jehovah's Witnesses
- Installed: 15 October 1971
- Term ended: 28 July 1994

Personal details
- Born: 17 February 1896 Kuşadası, Ottoman Empire
- Died: 28 July 1994 (aged 98) Brooklyn, New York, United States
- Buried: Watchtower Farms Cemetery

George Demetrius Gangas (17 February 1896 – 28 July 1994) was a Greek American member of the Governing Body of Jehovah's Witnesses, responsible for central work of said denomination from 1971 until his death in 1994.

== Early life ==
According to his own life report, Gangas was born in Kuşadası (Koushadasi; also called New Ephesus), at that time a town in the Ottoman Empire, and now a part of Turkey. His father died when he was young; he was raised by his mother, a devout follower of the Eastern Orthodox Church, who lacked access to the Bible.

After the outbreak of World War I, at the age of eighteen, he moved to Athens, where he went hungry due to the blockade imposed on Greece. He then left for Paris and, after the war, moved to Marseille. From there, he sailed to the United States, arriving in 1920.

== Religious life ==
=== First steps ===
Gangas went to work behind the counter at a store in Marietta, Ohio, where he first heard the teachings of the Bible Students movement (as Jehovah's Witnesses were then called) from a man who spoke to those present in the store. He became deeply involved in Bible study and was baptized on 15 July 1921.

=== Service and ministry ===
In March 1928 Gangas started his full-time preaching as a pioneer.

Gangas joined the headquarters of Jehovah's Witnesses in Brooklyn on 31 October 1928 to serve as a Greek translator. In the 1940s, he translated the publications of the Jehovah's Witnesses into Greek. He spent decades in full-time ministry, teaching, attending meetings, and serving in his religious community. He also learned Spanish to expand his ministry.

George D. Gangas served as a member of the Governing Body from 15 October 1971. He died on July 28, 1994, at the age of 98, after 66 years in full-time service.
