= Organizational structure of Jehovah's Witnesses =

Hierarchical structure of Christian denomination

Jehovah's Witnesses are organized hierarchically, and are led by the Governing Body of Jehovah's Witnesses from the Watch Tower Society's headquarters in Warwick, New York. The Governing Body, along with other "helpers", is organized into six committees responsible for various administrative functions within the global Witness community, including publication, assembly programs, and evangelizing activity.

The Governing Body and its committees supervise the operations of nearly one hundred branch offices worldwide. Each branch office oversees the activities of Jehovah's Witnesses in a particular country or region and may include facilities for the publication and distribution of Watch Tower Society literature. Directly appointed by the Governing Body, branch committees supervise administrative functions for congregations in their jurisdiction. Congregations are further organized into circuits of about twenty congregations each. The Governing Body directly appoints circuit overseers as its representatives to supervise activities within circuits. Headquarters representatives visit groups of branch offices to provide instruction and report the branch's activities to the Governing Body.

Each congregation is served by a group of locally recommended male elders and ministerial servants, appointed by the circuit overseer. Elders take responsibility for congregational governance, pastoral work, setting meeting times, selecting speakers, conducting meetings, directing the public preaching work, and forming committees to investigate and decide disciplinary action in cases where members are believed to have committed serious sins. Ministerial servants fulfill clerical and attendant duties, but may also teach and conduct meetings.

== Governing Body ==
The organization is directed by the Governing Body—an all-male group that varies in size, but since October 2024 has had eleven members,—based in the Watchtower Society's Warwick, New York headquarters. Each of the Governing Body members claims to be of the "anointed class" with a hope of heavenly life (whereas most Jehovah's Witnesses hope to be resurrected in an earthly paradise). There are no elections for membership; new members are selected by the existing body. Each of its members serves as chairman, with the position rotating among members alphabetically each year.

Until late 2012, the Governing Body described itself as the representative and "spokesman" of God's "faithful and discreet slave class" (approximately 11,000 Jehovah's Witnesses who in 2010 professed to be "anointed"), providing "spiritual food" for Witnesses worldwide on behalf of the "faithful and discreet slave class". In practice, it sought neither advice nor approval from other "anointed" Witnesses when formulating policies and doctrines, or when producing material for publications and conventions. At the 2012 Annual Meeting of the Watch Tower Society, the "faithful and discreet slave" was re-defined as referring to the Governing Body only.

From 1944, Watch Tower publications had made occasional references to a governing body, identifying it with the board of directors of the Watch Tower Bible and Tract Society of Pennsylvania. In October 1971, four additional men joined the seven members of the society's board of directors on what became known as a separate, expanded Governing Body. The Governing Body was then for the first time formally defined, indicating that it provided Jehovah's Witnesses with direction, guidance, and regulation. All doctrinal and publishing decisions continued to be made by or were subject to, the approval of the society's president. Organizational changes at the highest levels of the Watchtower Society in 1976 significantly increased the powers and authority of the Governing Body and reduced those of the Watch Tower Society president.

The Governing Body directs six committees comprising its members along with its "helpers". The six committees are responsible for various administrative functions including personnel, publishing, evangelizing activity, school, and assembly programs, writing, and coordination. The Governing Body directly appoints all headquarters representatives, and circuit overseers, collectively referred to as "traveling overseers", and also appoints branch office committee members. Only branch committee members and traveling overseers are referred to as "representatives of the Governing Body".

In the last decade, the Governing Body has reiterated its overall oversight role but has delegated other Witnesses, typically branch committee members, to serve as corporate executives and directors of Watch Tower and other incorporated entities.

== Branch offices ==
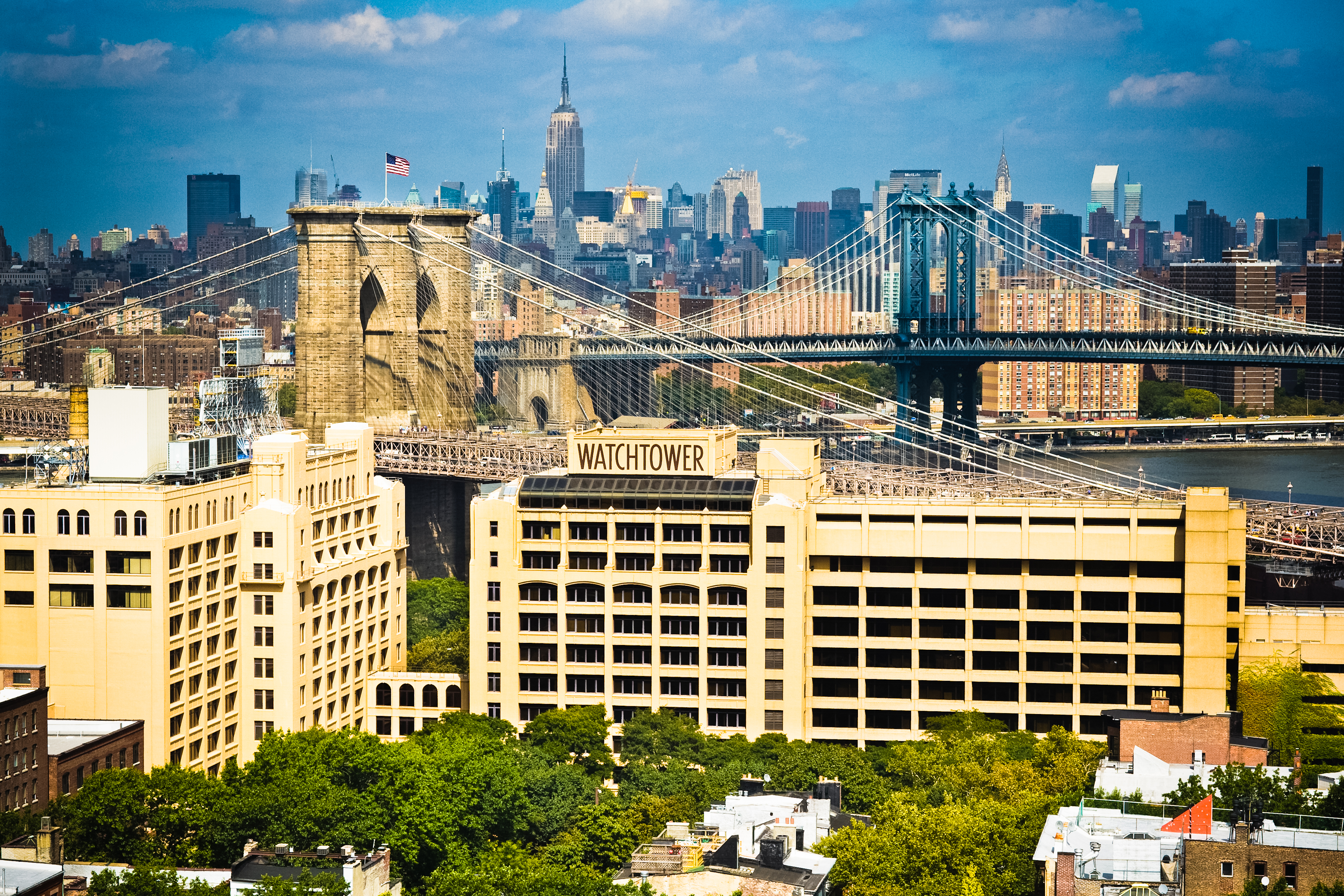
Former headquarters of the Watch Tower Bible and Tract Society in Brooklyn, New York

Jehovah's Witnesses operate 87 branch offices worldwide, under the oversight of headquarters representatives who visit each of their assigned branches every few years, auditing operations, counseling branch committee members, department heads, and missionaries, and reporting back to the Governing Body. Each branch office is referred to as Bethel. The United States branch office, spread across three New York State locations with a staff of more than 5000, also serves as the international headquarters.

Branch offices, operated by Witness volunteers known as Bethel families, produce and distribute Bible-based literature and communicate with congregations within their jurisdiction. Full-time staff at branch offices take a vow of poverty and are members of a religious order. Each branch is overseen by a committee of three or more elders, which is appointed by the Governing Body. A Service Department in each branch corresponds with congregations and supervises the work of traveling overseers. Branch offices may also have departments responsible for printing, translation, and legal representation.

Each branch office appoints various committees in its jurisdiction's communities, with local elders as members. Committees may include:

- Hospital Liaison Committee
- Patient Visitation Group
- Regional Building Committee
- Assembly Hall Committee
- District Convention Committee
- Disaster Relief Committee

== Traveling overseers ==
Jehovah's Witnesses use the term traveling overseer to refer to headquarters representatives and circuit overseers, all of whom are elders. All traveling overseers are directly appointed by the Governing Body. A branch may appoint qualified local elders as "substitute" circuit overseers. Additional training is provided at their School for Traveling Overseers, and ongoing pastoral care and instruction are provided to them by senior branch office representatives. In 1995, Witnesses reported that 4374 traveling overseers cared for 78,620 congregations, an average of about 18 congregations each.

The majority of traveling overseers are circuit overseers; they oversee circuits of about twenty congregations, performing twice-yearly week-long visits with each. During his visit, the circuit overseer delivers talks to the congregation and meets with the elders, ministerial servants, and pioneers. He is responsible for appointing new elders and ministerial servants, based on recommendations by elders. He typically works with various members of the congregation in the house-to-house preaching work, and may also conduct personal Bible studies and pastoral calls.

Jehovah's Witnesses are instructed to "participate in a joyful interchange of encouragement" with traveling overseers, and to render them "double honor", a biblical term they believe includes cooperation and hospitality. Traveling overseers are generally members of a religious order who have taken a vow of poverty; they are provided with vehicles, healthcare, and lodging, and their basic expenses are reimbursed by the congregations they visit.

== Congregations ==
Congregations are usually based on geographical area or language spoken and may have as few as ten or as many as two hundred members. Congregations meet for religious services at Kingdom Halls, which may be shared by two or more congregations. If a small group of Witnesses is isolated by geography or language, it may have some or all of its meetings at a different time and place to the rest of the congregation, under the supervision of that congregation's body of elders. If a group intends to become a new congregation, the area's circuit overseer submits an application to the branch office.

Each congregation is assigned a territory; members are requested to attend the congregation of the territory in which they reside. Members also meet in smaller "field service groups", often at private homes, prior to engaging in organized door-to-door preaching. Each field service group has an appointed "group overseer" (an elder) or "group servant" (a ministerial servant). Witnesses are instructed to devote as much time as possible to preaching activities ("witnessing" or "field service") and to provide a monthly report to their congregation confirming their preaching activity. For many years, these reports included the number of hours spent preaching, along with the amount of literature placed and the number of Bible studies conducted. As of November 2023, most members are only required to report that they engaged in any preaching activity during the month as well as the number of Bible studies conducted; members who have agreed to a specific hour requirement—for example, pioneers—still report the number of hours. Jehovah's Witnesses consider all baptized Witnesses to be ministers. Participants in organized preaching activities are referred to as publishers. Only individuals who are approved and active as publishers are officially counted as members.

Congregations are governed by local elders, who are assisted by ministerial servants. Elders and ministerial servants are appointed in each congregation to handle various religious and administrative duties. Only male members may serve in the capacity of elder or ministerial servant. In smaller congregations, one man may handle multiple positions until another qualified candidate is available. Baptized female members may perform some of their duties only if a baptized male is unavailable; female Witnesses leading in prayer or teaching are required to wear a head covering.

=== Elders ===
Each congregation has a body of elders, who are responsible for congregational governance, pastoral work, selecting speakers and conducting meetings, directing the public preaching work, and creating committees to investigate and decide disciplinary action for cases that are seen to breach scriptural laws.

There are no secular educational requirements for elders; however, training programs are offered for elders within the organization. Elders are considered "overseers" based on the biblical Greek term, ἐπίσκοπος (episkopos, typically translated "bishop"). Prospective elders are recommended from among ministerial servants and former elders by the local elder body for appointment by the circuit overseer.

Particular roles within the body of elders include:

- Congregation Secretary: maintains congregation records, reports congregation activity to the branch office, advises the congregation about conventions and assemblies, and oversees those handling accounts.
- Coordinator of the Body of Elders: chairs elders' meetings, assigns duties and speakers for most congregation meetings, and cares for certain financial matters.
- Group Overseers: oversees groups for public preaching and pastoral care.
- Life and Ministry Meeting Overseer: ensures that the Life and Ministry Meeting is handled according to the instructions set by the Watch Tower Society and schedules student assignments.
- Watchtower Study Conductor: leads the weekly study of The Watchtower.
- Operating Committee Members: responsible for the care of the building and property of Kingdom Halls that are shared by two or more congregations.
- Public Talk Coordinator: schedules speakers and talks for public meetings and coordinates traveling speakers from his congregation.
- Service Overseer: organizes matters related to public preaching, and oversees those handling Witness literature and territories.
- Auxilary Counselor: Gives private counsel (if needed) to elders and ministerial servants on any part they may give on stage. His goal is help them improve as teachers.

=== Ministerial servants ===
Ministerial servants, equivalent to deacons, are appointed to assist the elders with routine work, including the supply of literature to the congregation, and accounts, maintaining the Kingdom Hall, and operating audiovisual equipment. They also present various parts at the meetings. Ministerial servants are appointed in a similar manner to elders.

The following roles are normally filled by ministerial servants:

- Accounts Servant: collects donations from contribution boxes after each meeting, deposits money, and pays bills.
- Audio/Video Support Coordinator: coordinates and schedules others to run microphones, handle the stage and podium, and operate audio/video equipment. Also ensures that the meeting is broadcast via Zoom or other service for the benefit of any who cannot attend in person.
- Literature Servant: distributes literature, and handles requests for special items, or yearly items for use by congregation members. May place special request orders for publishers in their own Kingdom Hall.
- Cleaning Coordinator: Oversees and schedules regular cleaning of the Kingdom Hall.
- Territory Servant: distributes territory maps for preaching and keeps records of all territories within the congregation's area.
- Attendant/Security Servant: greets visitors, seats latecomers, takes a count of attendance, and is responsible for climate control of the Kingdom Hall and parking lot security.
- Christian Life and Ministry Assistant: in larger congregation, appointed to help the Christian Life and Ministry Overseer. His duties can include sending out reminders for those who have parts, finding replacements for parts, handing out assignment slips. May also help with scheduling and as a Secondary School Counselor for student parts.
- Group Servant: assumes the role of Group Overseer when a sufficient number of elders is not available, under the supervision of the body of elders.

=== Baptized publishers ===
Baptized publishers are members who have been publicly baptized following conversion to the faith. Jehovah's Witnesses do not practice infant baptism, and previous baptisms performed by other denominations are not considered valid. Prior to baptism, they are required to respond to a series of questions to assess their suitability and to make a personal dedication to serve God. Baptisms are typically performed at assemblies and conventions. From the moment of baptism, the organization officially considers the person to be a member of Jehovah's Witnesses, and an ordained minister.

Regular publishers do not have a specific quota of hours for preaching each month, but publishers are requested to "set goals such as reaching [the] national average of hours for publishers". Publishers are typically required to report at least one hour per month to be counted as a 'regular publisher'. Generally, only whole hours are reported and partial hours are carried over to the next month, though publishers limited by advanced age or serious health conditions may be allowed to report fifteen-minute increments.

Publishers who fail to report for one month are termed "irregular" and those who do not report for six consecutive months are called "inactive". The terms irregular and inactive are used to identify members in need of 'spiritual assistance' from congregation elders; those who are habitually 'irregular' or 'inactive' are usually restricted from serving in any special capacity. Yearly reports of congregation activity are compiled and published by the Watch Tower Society.

Baptized publishers considered to be exemplary may serve in various special preaching capacities:

- Auxiliary Pioneers: make a commitment of 15 or 30 hours of preaching activities for a given month. This can be performed on a per-month or ongoing basis.
- Regular Pioneers: make a commitment of 50 hours of preaching activity each month, totaling 600 hours for the year. For congregation elders to recommend the appointment of a regular pioneer, a publisher must be baptized for at least six months and be considered an exemplary member of the congregation. Members who have been reproved or reinstated in the last year may not serve as regular pioneers.
- Special Pioneers: assigned by a branch to perform a special activity, such as preaching in remote areas, which may require at least 130 hours per month. Special pioneers receive a stipend for basic living expenses.
- Missionaries: sent to foreign countries to preach. They spend at least 130 hours per month in preaching. Before assignment to a location, missionaries may receive training at Gilead School. Missionaries receive a stipend for basic living expenses.

==== Children ====
When accompanied by adults, children of baptized Witnesses may participate in organized preaching without formally qualifying. However, only those recognized as publishers are counted in the denomination's official membership statistics. Children of Witness parents may be asked to participate in demonstrations at congregation meetings and assemblies or as models and actors in materials published by the Watch Tower Society.

=== Unbaptized publishers ===
Unbaptized publishers are persons who are not yet baptized, but who have requested and been granted approval to join in the congregation's formal ministry. They must demonstrate a basic knowledge of Jehovah's Witnesses' doctrines to the elders, state their desire to be a Jehovah's Witness and conform to the organization's moral standards. To qualify as an unbaptized publisher, an individual must already be "an active associate of Jehovah's Witnesses", regularly attending congregation meetings.

Prior to 1988, unbaptized publishers were referred to as "approved associates", "unbaptized associates" or "regularly associating". The terms were discontinued on the basis that meeting attendance on its own does not constitute approval of or commitment to the faith.

=== Students ===
The term Bible student, sometimes informally referred to as a "Bible study", is generally used by Witnesses to refer to an individual who takes part in their religious study program. The purpose of the Bible study program is for the student to become baptized as a Jehovah's Witness.

Students usually have their study with the same Witness for the duration of the study program, often being the member who first encounters them while preaching. Interested individuals initially contacted by a member of the opposite sex are typically assigned a study conductor of their own gender. A student typically meets with his or her study conductor once each week at the student's home or other suitable location, or via videoconferencing. The study program involves consideration of a Bible-based publication that addresses Jehovah's Witnesses' core beliefs.

Each paragraph is read aloud by the conductor or student, and the student answers pre-printed questions from the material in the paragraph. Students are encouraged to look up cited scriptures in the Bible and include them in their responses. Each Bible study is typically conducted with an individual or family, though in some cases many people may take part. Students are invited to attend and even comment at congregation meetings. Students may also attend reading-improvement or literacy classes in congregations where these additional courses are held.

=== Associates ===
Individuals who attend meetings of Jehovah's Witnesses but are not involved in preaching are occasionally referred to in Watch Tower Society publications as "associates" or as being "associated with the congregation". Attendance figures for Witness events include "Jehovah's Witnesses and associates"; such statistics may be cited for comparison of Witness numbers with membership figures of other denominations, but only those sharing in their ministry are counted by Jehovah's Witnesses when reporting their official statistics.

Unbaptized individuals who attend meetings of Jehovah's Witnesses are not subject to congregation discipline, though elders may privately warn members of the congregation about individuals considered to constitute "an unusual threat to the flock."

== See also ==
- Jehovah's Witnesses beliefs
- Jehovah's Witnesses practices
