= J. Carter Swaim =

American professor

- Born: January 23, 1904; Selma
- Died: August 7, 1997 (aged 93); Washington
- Education: Doctor of Philosophy, Doctor of Divinity
- Alma mater: University of Edinburgh
- Occupation: Theologian, writer
- Position held: professor emeritus

Joseph Carter Swaim (January 23, 1904 – August 7, 1997) was an American professor emeritus of New Testament literature and exegesis at Western Theological Seminary and the head of the Bible department of the National Council of Churches in New York. He also served in pastorates at Presbyterian churches in Staten Island and St. Louis, the Church of the Covenant on Manhattan's East Side and the United Nations.

== Life ==
Swaim was born in Selma, Alabama and he died at the Presbyterian Medical Center in Washington.

Swaim studied at Washington and Jefferson College and Western Theological Seminary (now Pittsburgh Theological). He gained in 1927 his M.Div. at Western Theological Seminary. He earned a PhD with the thesis The historical character of the Fourth Gospel at the School of Theology of the University of Edinburgh.

He was professor of New Testament at the faculty of Western Theological Seminary in Pittsburgh. In 1954 Swaim joined the National Council of Churches to head its Bible department.

== Works ==
=== Thesis ===
- Swaim, J. C. (1931). The historical character of the Fourth Gospel (Phd diss. School of Theology, Edinburgh University). OCLC 780554233.

=== Books ===
- Swaim, J. Carter (1953). Right and Wrong Ways to Use the Bible. Philadelphia: Westminster Press. OCLC 747567.

== Sources ==
- "Paid Notice: Deaths SWAIM, J. CARTER, PH.D." The New York Times: 9. August 12, 1997.
- The New York Times Staff (August 24, 1997). "J. Carter Swaim, 93, a Theology Professor". The New York Times. 146 (50894): 34.
- "Inventory to Joseph Carter SWAIM". Pittsburgh Theological Seminary. Pittsburgh, Pennsylvania.
- "Miranda C. Herbert, Gale Research Company". Biography and Genealogy Master Index. Gale biographical index series. Vol. 1. Gale Research Company. 1997.
