= Xabier Pikaza =

Spanish theologian and professor

- Born: Antonio Xabier Pikaza Ibarrondo; 12 June 1941; Orozko
- Education: Doctor of Philosophy, Doctor of Theology
- Alma mater: Pontifical University of Salamanca; Pontifical University of Saint Thomas Aquinas
- Occupation: University teacher
- Employer: Pontifical University of Salamanca (1973–2003)

Antonio Xabier Pikaza Ibarrondo (born 12 June 1941, in Orozko, Spain) is a Spanish theologian of Liberation Theology and professor at the Pontifical University of Salamanca. He is one of the most renowned Spanish theologians of his time.

== Life ==
He entered the Order of Mercy, within which he was ordained a presbyter of the Catholic Church.

=== Education ===
He studied theology at the Pontifical University of Salamanca and received a Doctor of Theology in 1965. He later in 1972 received a Doctor of Philosophy from the Pontifical University of Saint Thomas Aquinas in Rome and specialized in biblical philology at the Pontifical Biblical Institute. Pikaza also furthered his studies at the universities of Bonn and Hamburg, Germany.

=== Teaching career ===
In 1972, he began teaching at the Faculty of Theology at the Pontifical University of Salamanca, where he became a professor in 1975. From 1975 to 1984 Pikaza was a full professor at the Pontifical University of Salamanca. Between 1985 and 1989 he researched at the Pontifical Biblical Institute in Rome and at other universities, preparing several publications.

In 1985, the Vatican Congregation for Seminars and University and the Congregation for the Doctrine of the Faith denied him the nihil obstat for his ideas on themes of dogmatic theology; therefore he cannot teach in universities of the Catholic Church. In 1989, he was granted the nihil obstat again but to teach phenomenology and History of Religions, not dogmatic theology. From 1989 to 2003, he was full professor of Dogmatic Theology at the Pontifical University of Salamanca, and was in charge of teaching the Phenomenology of Religion. He resumed his work as a professor at UPSA until he was dismissed again for doctrinal problems in 2003. During this time he abandoned the mercedarian order and the priesthood, marrying María Isabel Pérez Chaves.

=== Retirement ===
He also resigned from religious life as a member of the Order of La Merced and priest of the Catholic Church due to tensions with the hierarchy of the Catholic Church and the alleged persecution carried out by the hierarchy against his work and teaching. He married María Isabel Pérez Chaves and since then, he has continued his work as a researcher and writer, and has published more than thirty works in the fields of Theology, Ethics and History of Religion.

=== Writings ===
He has developed an enormous activity, from talks to dozens of books and articles published in magazines and encyclopedias. He was one of the nine experts who were neither politicians, victims, witnesses, or state officials, which the Commission of Investigation of the attacks of March 11 in Madrid called to give his opinion and contribute his knowledge of the implications of this subject, and will evaluate it from your area of knowledge about religions. Some of the main religious publishers include him in their list of authors. He has given numerous seminars and lectures on religious topics in Spain and America.

== Works ==
- Pikaza Ibarrondo, Xabier (1990). Trinidad y comunidad cristiana: el principio social del cristianismo. Koinonia (Secretariado Trinitario (Firm) (in Spanish). Vol. 30. Secretariado Trinitario. ISBN 848537682X.
- Pikaza Ibarrondo, Xabier (1992). Diccionario teológico: El Dios cristiano (in Spanish). Salamanca Secretariado Trinitario. ISBN 848537696X.
- Pikaza Ibarrondo, Xabier (2015). Gran diccionario de la Biblia (in Spanish). Verbo Divino. ISBN 8490731640.

== Sources ==
- "Xabier Pikaza". La Vanguardia.
- "Pikaza Ibarrondo, Xabier". Auñamendi Eusko Entziklopedia-Fondo Bernardo Estornés Lasa.
