= Pioneer (Jehovah's Witnesses) =

A pioneer is a baptized member of the Jehovah's Witnesses who voluntarily commits to spending a set number of hours per month or year on evangelizing work.

Pioneers (regular and auxiliary) do not receive compensation for their participation in preaching work. Nor are they employed by the congregation or by any legal entity associated with Jehovah's Witnesses. Most pioneers earn their living by working at a secular job. The term "pioneer" is not used as a title or honorary designation.

== History ==
The first pioneers were called colporteurs (at that time still by the Bible Students movement). The April 1881 issue of The Zion's Watch Tower featured an article titled "A Need for 1,000 Preachers", which encouraged those without dependents to devote as much time as they could to preaching work. In 1885, the number of colporteurs stood at 300. Initially, colporteurs were given complete freedom in choosing where to preach. In 1909, there were 625 pioneers. The number of 1,000 colporteurs was not exceeded until 1914.

After 1931, distributors began to be called pioneers. The Watchtower Society began sending out its first special pioneers in 1937. Their task was to play Bible talks from phonograph records at people's doorsteps and to revisit them to conduct Bible discussions. At first, special pioneers focused on large cities where congregations of Jehovah's Witnesses already existed. A few years later, pioneers began to be sent to areas where Jehovah's Witnesses were not yet engaged in preaching work. In 1939, three hundred special pioneers played a 4.5-minute Bible talk over half a million times, reaching more than a million people. This encouraged other publishers to use gramophones, and as a result, 92 different Bible talks were played on over 47,000 devices. In 2015, a song was added to the Jehovah's Witnesses songbook whose lyrics refer to the activities of the pioneers. The song is titled The Life of a Pioneer.

== Types of Pioneer Service ==
- Auxiliary pioneer—a preacher—may take up this type of service immediately after baptism, for one or several months, and sometimes even until further notice. By filling out a special application, he commits to devoting at least 30 hours a month to preaching. After reviewing whether a given preacher meets the requirements, the elders of the local congregation may approve his application for auxiliary pioneer service. Such a pioneer preaches within the territory of his congregation. Worldwide—across 241 countries—there were an average of 864,870 auxiliary pioneers in 2025. Auxiliary pioneers were first appointed in 1917. They were known as special distributors. At that time, there were about 100 of them in some congregations.
- Regular pioneer is a preacher who is able to spend at least 600 hours a year in preaching work (an average of at least 50 hours a month), and has been baptized for at least six months. After the congregation elders approve his application, they appoint him as a pioneer. He may carry out evangelistic work as a regular pioneer within his congregation or in the territory to which he is assigned as needed. At the end of their first year of service, regular pioneers are invited to attend a special six-day training program—the Pioneer Service School. Experienced pioneers between the ages of 21 and 65, who have completed two years of pioneer service and are ready to work in their assigned territories, may enroll in the two-month School for Kingdom Evangelizers. A pioneer participates in meetings for pioneers during the circuit overseer's visit, the annual congregation meeting, and a special meeting held in connection with the circuit assembly (in exceptional circumstances, this was conducted via the JW Stream–Studio online platform). In 2025, there were an average of 1,743,567 permanent pioneers worldwide. In April 1881, when there were about 100 Bible Students, Charles T. Russell published an appeal in The Zion's Watch Tower titled "The Need for 1,000 Preachers". In 1885, about 300 distributors were engaged in preaching work. Of this group, 50 were doing so full-time in 1888.
- Special Pioneer – a preacher who devotes 100 hours a month to preaching. Each person is appointed as a special pioneer by the Branch Office of Jehovah's Witnesses that coordinates activities in the country where they live. Usually, experienced regular pioneers are invited to undertake this type of pioneering service, as they are able to preach wherever the Branch Office directs them. They are often sent to an area where they can establish a new congregation, either in their own country or in a neighbouring one. As they devote most of their time to evangelising, they are unable to earn a living. Therefore, they receive a grant from the Watchtower Society to cover their essential expenses. In 1992, there were over 14,500 special pioneers worldwide; in 2015, there were over 55,000; and in 2023, there were over 27,000. Due to the nature of their special assignment, special pioneers belong to the Worldwide Body of Special Full-Time Servants of Jehovah's Witnesses. From among the temporary special pioneers, appointed from the graduates of the School for Kingdom Evangelizers, following an annual review of their work by the Branch Office Service Committee, they are invited to serve as field missionaries.

== Table showing the number of pioneers ==
| Year | The average number of pioneers (part-time and full-time) in the world |
|---|---|
| 1914 | 1000 |
| 1930 | 2897 |
| 1940 | 5251 |
| 1950 | 14 093 |
| 1960 | 30 584 |
| 1970 | 88 871 |
| 1980 | 137 861 |
| 1990 | 536 508 |
| 2000 | 805 205 |
| 2010 | 1 132 861 |
| 2015 | 1 578 714 |
| 2020 | 1 638 187 |
| 2021 | 1 748 642 |
| 2022 | 1 846 512 |
| 2023 | 2 284 589 |
| 2024 | 2 519 200 |
| 2025 | 2 578 437 |

== Pioneer Service School ==
Pioneer Service School – a six-day training course for pioneers – held at the end of the first year of service – launched in December 1977 in the United States. It consists of 40 hours of lessons, comprising discussions, demonstrations and workshops, designed to better equip participants for pioneer service. Currently, alongside new participants, graduates who have not attended the course during the last five years of their pioneer service are also gradually being invited to take part in this training. They learn how to talk to people they meet, discuss the Bible and organisational matters, and how to apply the principles found in the Scriptures to their daily lives, as well as how to cultivate and demonstrate Christian qualities such as humility and love. It is designed to help the pioneer strengthen his bond with Jehovah God, encourage him to continue in faithful service, and improve his skills in all areas of that service. The source materials for this school are the Bible and the handbook Fully Accomplish Your Ministry—(2 Timothy 4:5).

Due to the COVID-19 pandemic, the course was held via videoconference for the first time the Jehovah's Witnesses' history in 2021 (it was also held in this format in 2022).
