= Watchtower Bible School of Gilead =

Coordinates: 41.4960°N 73.5750°W

Watch Tower Bible School of Gilead
- Patterson, New York; United States

Information
- Type: Religious
- Established: February 1, 1943; 83 years ago
- Enrollment: 154 (2023)
- Affiliation: Jehovah's Witnesses

Watchtower Bible School of Gilead is the formal name of the missionary school of Jehovah's Witnesses, typically referred to simply as Gilead or Gilead School. Gilead is the flagship school at the Watchtower Educational Center at Patterson, New York, United States.

== History ==
In 1942, Nathan H. Knorr, then president of the Watchtower Society, proposed the Watchtower Bible College of Gilead as an opportunity to expand their global preaching efforts. The name was later changed to Watchtower Bible School of Gilead. Originally intended as a temporary program, the first class began on February 1, 1943. No tuition was to be charged. Five months later, graduating students began to move out to their assignments in nine Latin-American countries, including Cuba. As early as 1956, graduates were serving "in about a hundred different lands".

Gilead School has held classes at several of the facilities operated by the Watchtower Society:

- Kingdom Farm in South Lansing, New York from 1943 to 1960
- Watch Tower Society headquarters in Brooklyn, New York from 1961 to 1988
- Watchtower Farms in Wallkill, New York from 1988 to 1995; and
- Watchtower Educational Center in Patterson, New York since 1995.

As of 2020, Gilead has trained 148 classes. In 2008, Gilead School surpassed 8000 students. Encyclopædia Britannica notes that Gilead was intended to train "missionaries and leaders"; two current members of the Governing Body of Jehovah's Witnesses are Gilead graduates, as were four deceased members.

In 1987, an ancillary 8½ week Bible School for Single Brothers was introduced for single elders and ministerial servants (their term for deacons). A similar Bible School for Christian Couples was introduced in 2010 for wives to attend with their husbands.

== Curriculum and goals ==
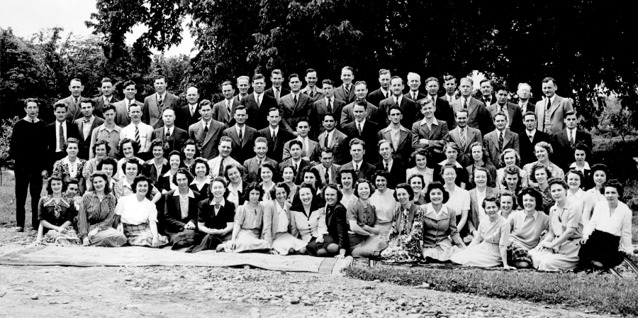
First class of Watchtower Bible School of Gilead in 1943.

Theology lecturer George D. Chryssides writes that the initial Gilead syllabus was "described as the Advanced Course in Theocratic Ministry"; within months the program led to "similar training" in congregations as the Theocratic Ministry School. Female Witnesses could enroll in Gilead school and present talks since its inception in 1943, but could not enroll in congregation schools until 1959.

The school is held twice each year and lasts about five months. Students are selected by invitation, and are usually married couples in their thirties who have been involved in missionary work in their home countries for a number of years. After graduation, they are assigned mainly to Africa, South America, Asia and islands in the Pacific Ocean.

Gilead School's main textbook is the Bible. Lectures and student presentations focus on a verse-by-verse study of each book of the Bible, alternating between the Old and New Testaments, which they refer to as the Hebrew and Greek Scriptures. The curriculum is based on Jehovah's Witnesses' New World Translation of the Holy Scriptures, although other reference material, including other Bible translations, is used. Students are also taught about changes in culture and language as well as techniques for conducting meetings and Bible classes. Some students receive additional practical training for translation and literature production.
