= Thomas Nelson Winter =

- Born: 27 January 1944 (age 82); Lansing, Michigan, US

Academic background
- Education: Michigan State University; Northwestern University
- Thesis: Apology as prosecution: the trial of Apuleius

Academic work
- Discipline: classics
- Institutions: University of Nebraska–Lincoln

Thomas Nelson Winter (born in 1944) was an American associate professor of Greek in Classics and Religious Studies at University of Nebraska–Lincoln and former president of the Unitarian Church of Lincoln.

== Life ==
=== Education ===
In 1964 Winter earned a B.A. at the Michigan State University. In 1965 he also earned a M.A. the Northwestern University in Chicago. From 1968, Winter holds his PhD in Classics at the Northwestern University, with the thesis Apology as prosecution: the trial of Apuleius.

=== Teaching ===
In 1970 Winter joined the faculty of the University of Nebraska–Lincoln as a professor of classical and religious studies, and his retirement was effective May 10, 2013.

== Works ==
=== Thesis ===
- Thomas Nelson Winter (1968). Apology as prosecution: the trial of Apuleius (Ph. D. (Classics)--Northwestern University). OCLC 71836876.

=== Books ===
- Thomas Nelson Winter (2007). An analytical directory of the Latin endings. [Lincoln, Neb.]: University of Nebraska-Lincoln. OCLC 191549816.

=== Articles ===
- Thomas Nelson Winter (1969). "The Publication of Apuleius' Apology". Transactions and Proceedings of the American Philological Association. 100. The Johns Hopkins University Press: 607–612. doi:10.2307/2935932. JSTOR 2935932.
- Thomas Nelson Winter (1973). "Catullus Purified: A Brief History of Carmen 16". Arethusa. 6 (2). The Johns Hopkins University Press: 257–265. JSTOR 26307434.
- Thomas Nelson Winter (January 1999). "Roberto Busa, S.J., and the invention of the machine-generated concordance". Classics and Religious Studies. Raccolta delle opere di Roberto Busa, 23, 358. 75 (1). University of Nebraska–Lincoln: Faculty Publications, Classics and Religious Studies Department. OCLC 879836018.
- Aristotle; Thomas Nelson Winter (2007). "The Mechanical problems in the corpus of Aristotle". Faculty Publications, Classics and Religious Studies Department. [Lincoln, Neb.]: University of Nebraska-Lincoln: Faculty Publications, Classics and Religious Studies Department. OCLC 191570064.

== Sources ==
- Gaichas, Lawrence E., ed. (1992). Directory of College and University Classicists in the United States and Canada. Classical world. Vol. 85 (3 ed.). Classical Association of the Atlantic States.
- Westra, Maren (2012-10-21). "Skateboarding professor Thomas Winter announces retirement". The Daily Nebraskan.
