= Governing Body of Jehovah's Witnesses =

Ruling council of Jehovah's Witnesses

The Governing Body of Jehovah's Witnesses is the ruling council of Jehovah's Witnesses, based in the denomination's Warwick, New York, headquarters. The body formulates doctrines, oversees the production of written material for publications and conventions, and administers the denomination's worldwide operations. Official publications refer to members of the Governing Body as followers of Christ rather than religious leaders.

Its size has varied, from seven (2010–2012, 2014–2018) to eighteen (1974–1975, 1977–1979) members, all of them men. New members of the Governing Body are selected by existing members.

== History ==
Since its incorporation in 1884, the Watch Tower Bible and Tract Society of Pennsylvania has been directed by a president and board of directors. Until January 1976, the president exercised complete control of doctrines, publications and activities of the Watch Tower Society and the religious denominations with which it was connected—the Bible Students and Jehovah's Witnesses. When the Society's second president, J. F. Rutherford, encountered opposition from directors in 1917, he dismissed them. In 1925, he overruled the Watch Tower Society's editorial committee when it opposed publication of an article about disputed doctrines regarding the year 1914. In 1931, the editorial committee was dissolved.

In 1943, The Watchtower described the Watch Tower Bible and Tract Society as the "legal governing body" of anointed Jehovah's Witnesses. A year later, in an article opposing the democratic election of congregation elders, the magazine said the appointment of such ones was the duty of "a visible governing body under Jehovah God and his Christ". For several years, the role and specific identity of the governing body remained otherwise undefined. A 1955 organizational handbook stated that "the visible governing body has been closely identified with the board of directors of this corporation."

Referring to events related to their 1957 convention, a 1959 publication said "the spiritual governing body of Jehovah's witnesses watched the developments [then] the president of the Watch Tower Bible & Tract Society [acted]." The 1970 Yearbook of Jehovah's Witnesses noted that the Watch Tower Bible and Tract Society of Pennsylvania was the organization used to plan the activity of Jehovah's Witnesses and provide them with "spiritual food", then declared: "So really the governing body of Jehovah's Witnesses is the board of directors of the Watch Tower Bible and Tract Society of Pennsylvania."

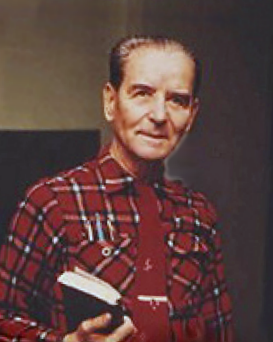
Frederick Franz at Watch Tower Society headquarters in Brooklyn

On October 1, 1971, Watch Tower Society vice-president Frederick Franz addressed the annual meeting of the Pennsylvania corporation in Buckingham, Pennsylvania, stating that the legal corporation of the Watch Tower Society was an "agency" or "temporary instrument" used by the Governing Body on behalf of the "faithful and discreet slave". Three weeks later, on October 20, four additional men joined the seven members of the Society's board of directors on what became known as a separate, expanded Governing Body.

The board of directors had until then met only sporadically, usually to discuss the purchase of property or new equipment, leaving decisions about Watch Tower Society literature to the president and vice-president, Nathan Knorr and Fred Franz. The Watchtower of December 15, 1971, was the first to unambiguously capitalize the term "Governing Body of Jehovah's witnesses" as the defined group leading the denomination, with a series of articles explaining its role and its relationship with the Watch Tower Society.

The focus on the new concept of "theocratic" leadership was accompanied by statements that the structure was not actually new: The Watch Tower declared that "a governing body made its appearance" some time after the formation of Zion's Watch Tower Society in 1884, though it had not been referred to as such at the time. The article stated that Watch Tower Society president Charles Taze Russell had been a member of the governing body.

The 1972 Yearbook of Jehovah's Witnesses stated that following Rutherford's death in 1942 "one of the first things that the governing body decided upon was the inauguration of the Theocratic Ministry School" and added that the "governing body" had published millions of books and Bibles in the previous thirty years. However, Raymond Franz, former member of the Governing Body, stated in his 1983 expose Crisis of Conscience that the actions of presidents Russell, Rutherford and Knorr in overriding and failing to consult with directors proved the Bible Students and Jehovah's Witnesses had been under a monarchical rule until 1976, leaving no decisions to any "governing body".

In 1972, a "Question From Readers" article in The Watchtower further reinforced the concept of the "Governing Body"; the magazine said the term referred to an agency that administers policy and provides organizational direction, guidance and regulation and was therefore "appropriate, fitting and Scriptural". Organizational changes at the highest levels of the Watch Tower Society in 1976 significantly increased the powers and authority of the Governing Body. The body has never had a legal corporate existence and operates through the Watch Tower Society and its board of directors.

=== Reorganization ===
After its formal establishment in 1971, the Governing Body met regularly but, according to Raymond Franz, only briefly. Franz claims meetings were sometimes as short as seven minutes, to make decisions about branch appointments and conduct that should be considered disfellowshipping offenses. Franz claims that in 1971 and again in 1975, the Governing Body debated the extent of the authority it should be given.

The Governing Body voted in December 1975 to establish six operating committees to oversee the various administrative requirements of the organization's worldwide activities that formerly had been under the direction of the president. Each branch overseer was replaced by a branch committee of at least three members. The change, which took effect on January 1, 1976, was described in the Watch Tower Society's 1993 history book, Jehovah's Witnesses—Proclaimers of God's Kingdom, as "one of the most significant organizational readjustments in the modern-day history of Jehovah's Witnesses".

=== Headquarters purge ===
In 1980, dissent arose among members of the Governing Body regarding the significance of 1914 in Jehovah's Witnesses' doctrines. According to former Witnesses James Penton and Heather and Gary Botting, internal dissatisfaction with official doctrines continued to grow, leading to a series of secret investigations and judicial hearings. Consequently, dissenting members were expelled from the Brooklyn headquarters staff in the same year. Raymond Franz claimed he was forced to resign from the Governing Body, and he was later disfellowshipped from the group.

The Watch Tower Society responded to the dissent with a more severe attitude regarding the treatment of expelled Witnesses. In his 1997 study of the denomination, Penton concluded that since Raymond Franz's expulsion in 1980, the Governing Body displayed an increased level of conservatism, sturdy resistance to changes of policy and doctrines, and an increased tendency to isolate dissidents within the organization by means of disfellowshipping.

=== Helpers ===
The April 15, 1992, issue of The Watchtower carried an article entitled Jehovah's Provision, the "Given Ones" which drew a parallel between ancient non-Israelites who had been assigned temple duties (the "Nethinim" and "sons of the servants of Solomon") and Witness elders in positions of responsibility immediately under the oversight of the Governing Body who did not profess to be "anointed".

Both that issue of The Watchtower and the 1993 Yearbook of Jehovah's Witnesses carried the same announcement:

In view of the tremendous increase worldwide, it seems appropriate at this time to provide the Governing Body with some additional assistance. Therefore it has been decided to invite several helpers, mainly from among the great crowd, to share in the meetings of each of the Governing Body Committees, that is, the Personnel, Publishing, Service, Teaching, and Writing Committees. Thus, the number attending the meetings of each of these committees will be increased to seven or eight. Under the direction of the Governing Body committee members, these assistants will take part in discussions and will carry out various assignments given them by the committee. This new arrangement goes into effect May 1, 1992. For many years now, the number of the remnant of anointed Witnesses has been decreasing, while the number of the great crowd has increased beyond our grandest expectations.

Each of the current Governing Body members served as a committee "helper" before being appointed to the Governing Body itself. The appointment of helpers to the Governing Body committees was described in 2006 as "still another refinement".

=== 2000 and beyond ===
Until 2000, the directors and officers of the Watch Tower Society were members of the Governing Body. Since then, members of the ecclesiastical Governing Body have not served as directors of any of the various corporations used by Jehovah's Witnesses, and the Governing Body has delegated such administrative responsibilities to other members of the group.

== Committees ==
The Governing Body functions by means of its six committees, which carry out various administrative functions. Each committee is assisted by "helpers", who do not necessarily profess to be "anointed". Governing Body meetings are held weekly in closed session. According to Raymond Franz, decisions of the body were required to be unanimous until 1975, after which a two-thirds majority of the full body was required, regardless of the number present.

- The Personnel Committee arranges for volunteers to serve in the organization's headquarters and worldwide branch offices, which are each referred to as Bethel (from a Hebrew term meaning house of God). It oversees arrangements for the personal and spiritual assistance of Bethel staff, as well as the selection and invitation of new Bethel members.
- The Publishing Committee supervises the printing, publishing and shipping of literature, as well as legal matters involved in printing, such as obtaining property for printing facilities. It is responsible for overseeing factories, properties, and financial operations of corporations used by Jehovah's Witnesses.
- The Service Committee supervises the evangelical activity of Jehovah's Witnesses, which includes traveling overseers, pioneers, and the activities of congregation publishers. It oversees communication between the international headquarters, branch offices, and the congregations. It examines annual reports of preaching activity from the branches. It is responsible for inviting members to attend the Gilead school, the Bible School for Single Brothers, and the Traveling Overseers' School, and for assigning graduates of these schools to their places of service.
- The Teaching Committee arranges congregation meetings, circuit assemblies, and regional and international conventions as well as various schools for elders, ministerial servants, pioneers and missionaries, such as Gilead school. It supervises preparation of material to be used in teaching, and oversees the development of new audio and video programs.
- The Writing Committee supervises the writing and translation of all material published by the Watch Tower Bible and Tract Society, including scripts for dramas and talk outlines. It responds to questions about scriptural, doctrinal, and moral issues, specific problems in the congregations, and the standing of members in congregations.
- The Coordinator's Committee deals with emergencies, disaster relief and other matters, such as investigations. It comprises the coordinators, or a representative, from each of the other Governing Body committees and a secretary who is also a member of the Governing Body. It is responsible for the efficient operation of the other committees.

== Representatives ==
Initially, the Governing Body directly appointed all congregation elders. By 1975, the appointment of elders and ministerial servants was said to be "made directly by a governing body of spirit-anointed elders or by them through other elders representing this body." In 2001, The Watchtower, stated that recommendations for such appointments were submitted to branch offices. As of September 2014, circuit overseers appoint elders and ministerial servants after discussion with congregation elders, without consulting with the branch office.

The Governing Body continues to directly appoint branch office committee members and traveling overseers, and only such direct appointees are described as "representatives of the Governing Body".

== Relationship with "faithful and discreet slave" ==
The Governing Body is said to provide "spiritual food" for Jehovah's Witnesses worldwide. Until late 2012, the Governing Body described itself as the representative and "spokesman" for God's "faithful and discreet slave class" (Jehovah's Witnesses who profess to be anointed) who are collectively said to be God's "prophet" and "channel for new spiritual light". The Governing Body does not consult with the other anointed Witnesses whom it was said to represent when formulating policy and doctrines or approving material for publications and conventions; the authority of the Governing Body was presumed to be analogous to that of the older men of Jerusalem in cases such as the first-century circumcision issue.

The majority of Witnesses who profess to be anointed have no authority to contribute to the development or change of doctrines. Anointed Witnesses are instructed to remain modest and avoid "wildly speculating about things that are still unclear", instead waiting for God to reveal his purposes in The Watchtower.

In 2009, The Watchtower indicated that the dissemination of "new spiritual light" is the responsibility of only "a limited number" of the "slave class", asking: "Are all these anointed ones throughout the earth part of a global network that is somehow involved in revealing new spiritual truths? No." In 2010 the society said that "deep truths" were discerned by "responsible representatives" of the "faithful and discreet slave class" at the group's headquarters, and then considered by the entire Governing Body before making doctrinal decisions.

In August 2011, the Governing Body stated that "we have no way of knowing the exact number of anointed ones on earth; nor do we need to know", and that it "does not maintain a global network of anointed ones". At the 2012 Annual Meeting of the Watch Tower Society, the "faithful and discreet slave" was redefined as referring to the Governing Body only and the terms are now synonymous.

== Governing Body members ==
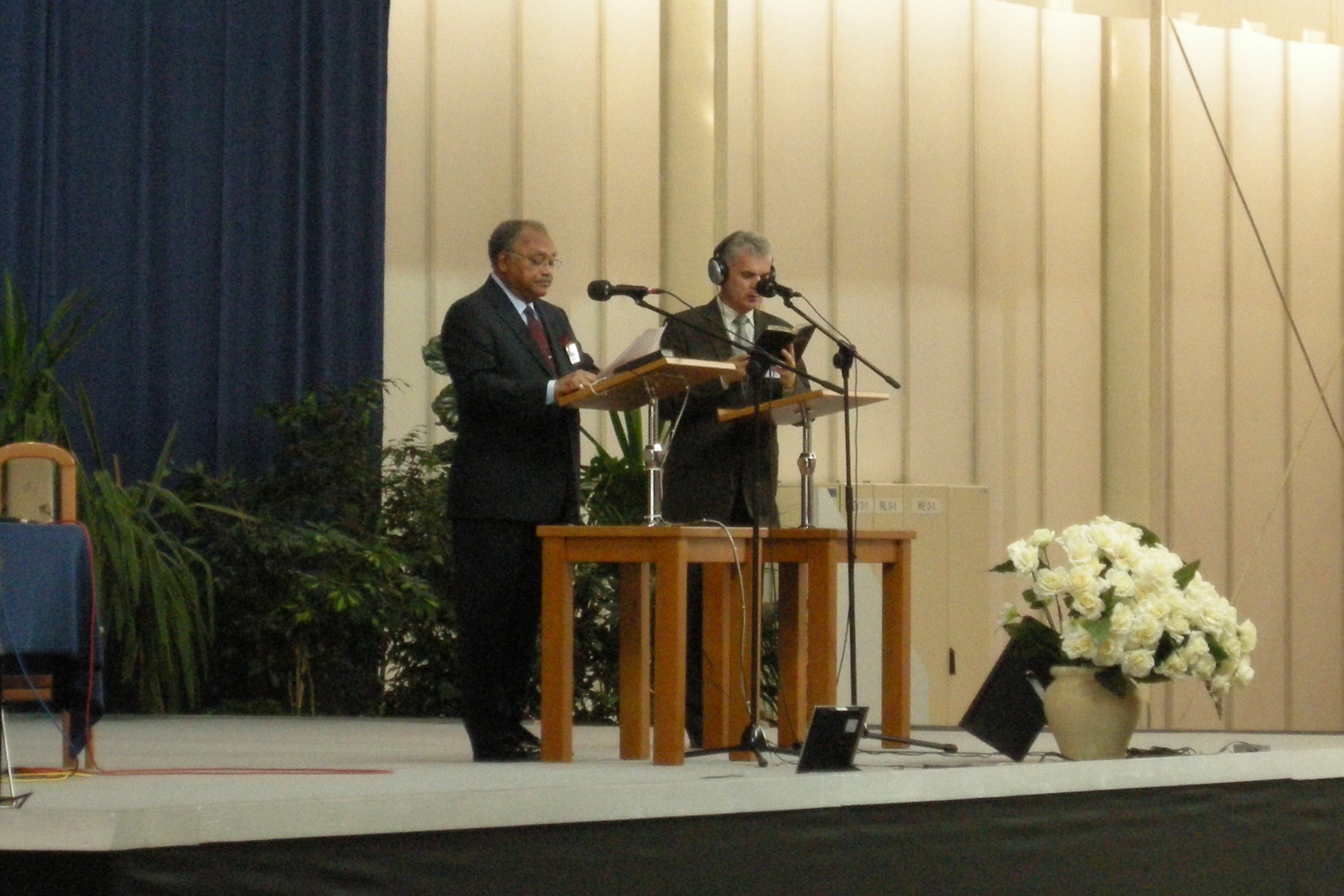
Samuel Herd (to the left)

=== Current ===
The following people are members of the Governing Body of Jehovah's Witnesses (year of appointment in parentheses):

- Kenneth Eugene Cook, Jr. (2018)
- Gage Fleegle (2023)
- Samuel Frederick Herd (1999)
- Geoffrey William Jackson (2005)
- Jody Jedele (2024)
- Mark Stephen Lett (1999)
- Gerrit Lösch (1994)
- Jacob Rumph (2024)
- Douglas Mark Sanderson (2012)
- David Howard Splane (1999)
- Jeffrey Winder (2023)

=== List of members ===
Prior to 1971, various Watch Tower Society directors were informally identified as members of the "governing body". Watch Tower publications began capitalizing Governing Body as a proper noun in 1971; The Watchtower announced that the "present Governing Body comprises eleven anointed witnesses of Jehovah" the same year. All members served until their deaths unless specified.

Name (year of death)	Tenure began	Tenure ended	Length of tenure	Source(s)
Thomas James Sullivan (Note: Director 1932–1973.) (1974)	1 October 1971	30 July 1974	2 years, 302 days	
John Otto Groh (Note: Director 1965–fl. 1973.) (1975)	1 October 1971	23 January 1975	3 years, 114 days	
Nathan Homer Knorr (Note: Director 1940–1977, vice-president 1940/1941–1942, president 1942–1977.) (1977)	1 October 1971	8 June 1977	5 years, 250 days	
Grant Suiter (Note: Director 1938–1983, secretary–treasurer 1947–1983.) (1983)	1 October 1971	22 November 1983	12 years, 52 days	
Frederick William Franz (Note: Director 1944–1992, vice-president 1945–1977, president 1977–1992.) (1992)	1 October 1971	22 December 1992	21 years, 82 days	
Lyman Alexander Swingle (Note: Director 1945–2000, secretary-treasurer 1983/1984–2000.) (2001)	1 October 1971	14 March 2001	29 years, 164 days	
Milton George Henschel (Note: Director 1947–2000, vice-president ?–1992, president 1992–2000.) (2003)	1 October 1971	22 March 2003	31 years, 172 days	
William Kirk Jackson (Note: Director 1973–?.) (1981)	15 October 1971	13 December 1981	10 years, 59 days	
George Demetrius Gangas (1994)	15 October 1971	28 July 1994	22 years, 286 days	
Raymond Victor Franz (2010)	20 October 1971	22 May 1980 (Note: Resigned, disfellowshipped in 1981.)	8 years, 215 days	
Leo Kincaid Greenlees (?)	October 1971	1984–1985 (Note: Resigned.)	c. 13–14 years	
Charles John Fekel (1977)	c. 28 November 1974 (Note: Announced 28 November 1974.)	24 April 1977	c. 2 years, 147 days	
Ewart Charles Chitty (?)	c. 28 November 1974	1979 (Note: Resigned.)	c. 4–5 years	?
John Charles Booth (1996)	c. 28 November 1974	8 January 1996	c. 21 years, 41 days	
William Lloyd Barry (1999)	c. 28 November 1974	2 July 1999	c. 24 years, 216 days	
Karl Frederick Klein (2001)	c. 28 November 1974	3 January 2001	c. 26 years, 36 days	
Albert Darger Schroeder (2006)	c. 28 November 1974	8 March 2006	c. 31 years, 100 days	
Daniel Sydlik (2006)	c. 28 November 1974	18 April 2006	c. 31 years, 141 days	
Theodore Jaracz (2010)	c. 28 November 1974	9 June 2010	c. 35 years, 193 days	
Martin Pötzinger (1988)	c. 7 September 1977 (Note: Announced 7 September 1977. Appointed to succeed Fekel, Knorr and Groh.)	16 June 1988	c. 10 years, 283 days	
Carey Walter Barber (2007)	c. 7 September 1977	8 April 2007	c. 29 years, 213 days	
John Edwin Barr (Note: Director fl. 1982.) (2010)	c. 7 September 1977	4 December 2010	c. 33 years, 88 days	
Gerrit Lösch	1 July 1994	Incumbent	31 years, 322 days	
Guy Hollis Pierce (2014)	c. 2 October 1999 (Note: Announced 2 October 1999.)	18 March 2014	c. 14 years, 167 days	
David Howard Splane	c. 2 October 1999	Incumbent	c. 26 years, 229 days	
Mark Stephen Lett	c. 2 October 1999	Incumbent	c. 26 years, 229 days	
Samuel Frederick Herd	c. 2 October 1999	Incumbent	c. 26 years, 229 days	
Anthony Morris III	1 September 2005	c. 22 February 2023 (Note: Announced 22 February 2023. Left the Governing Body in unclear circumstances.)	c. 17 years, 174 days	
Geoffrey William Jackson	1 September 2005	Incumbent	20 years, 260 days	
Douglas Mark Sanderson	1 September 2012	Incumbent	13 years, 260 days	
Kenneth Eugene Cook, Jr.	c. 24 January 2018 (Note: Announced 24 January 2018.)	Incumbent	c. 8 years, 115 days	
Gage Fleegle	c. 18 January 2023 (Note: Announced 18 January 2023.)	Incumbent	c. 3 years, 116 days	
Jeffrey Winder	c. 18 January 2023	Incumbent	c. 3 years, 116 days	
Jody Jedele	c. 5 October 2024 (Note: Announced 5 October 2024.)	Incumbent	c. 1 year, 226 days	
Jacob Rumph	c. 5 October 2024	Incumbent	c. 1 year, 226 days	

=== Timeline ===
Timeline of Governing Body members since the Body's establishment in October 1971. Resignation dates for Greenlees and Chitty are approximate with high uncertainty. References are in the table above.
Died in office
Tenure ended while still alive
Incumbent

== See also ==
- Organizational structure of Jehovah's Witnesses
