= Macau Baptist Church =

Coordinates: 22°11′42″N 113°32′35″E

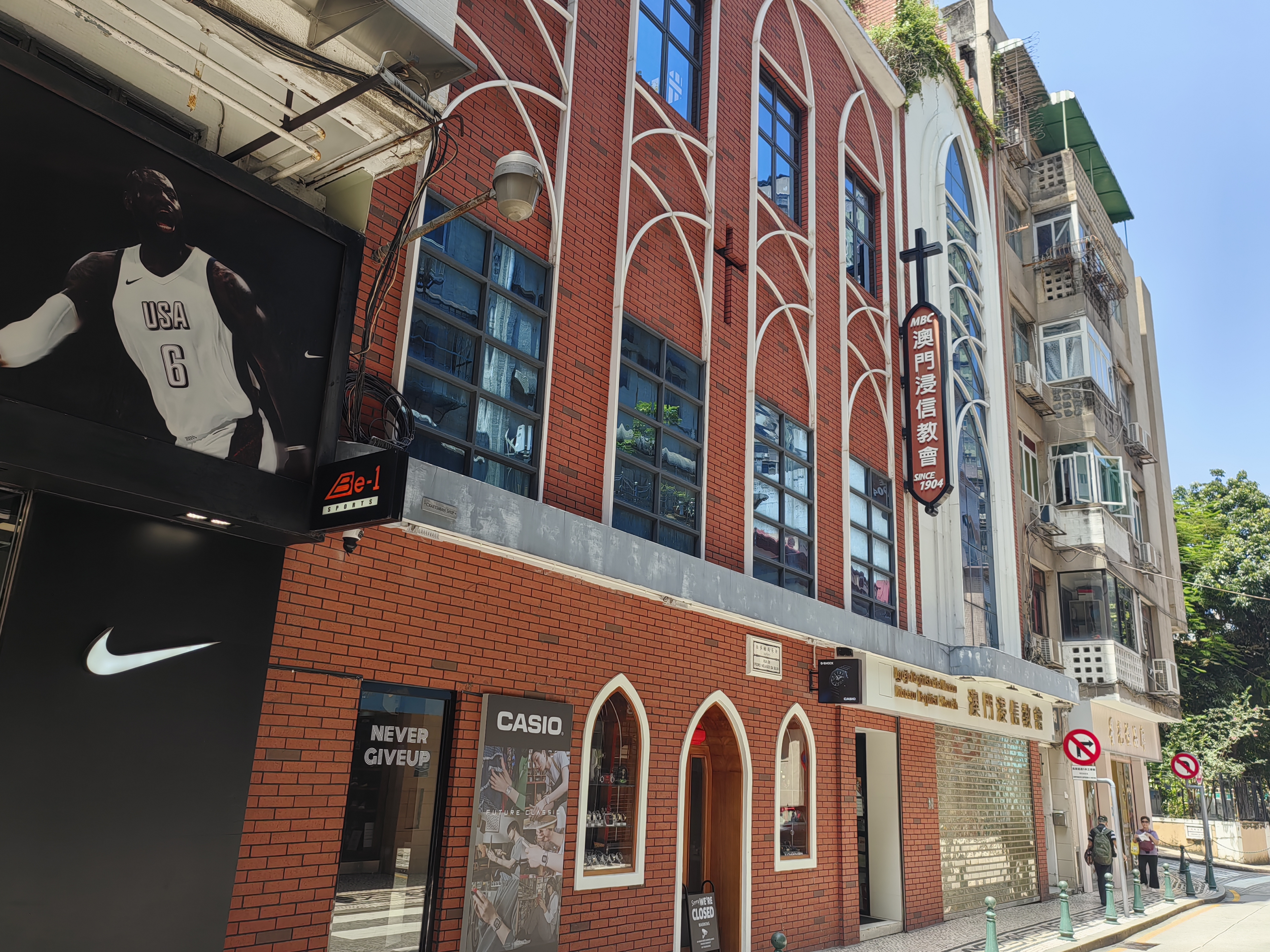
Front facade of Macau Baptist Church, July 2026

Macau Baptist Church (Chinese: 澳門浸信教會), also known as the Macau First Baptist Church, is the oldest Chinese Baptist church in Macau, with a history of over one century. It is located at Rua de Pedro Nolasco da Silva, No. 41, Macau; and serves as the headquarters of the Macau Baptist Convention.

== History ==
In December 1903, Rev. Charlton Todd and his wife were sent to Macau by the Southern Baptist Convention in the United States for missionary work. Five people were baptized in 1904, and by 1905, the membership had grown to twenty-five. The church was formally established in 1905 as the "Faith and Blessing Church", the predecessor of the present-day Macau Baptist Church. Initially, they rented a three-story house on Rua do Campo for meetings and missionary work.

In 1908, Rev. Charlton Todd died of illness while back to the United States for a missionary report. In the same year, the American church sent Reverend John Galloway to take over, who, together with Lilian Lamont Reeves Todd Galloway, the widow of Rev. Charlton Todd, developed missionary work in Macau. They married more than a decade later.

The Macau Baptist Church successively established "Pui Chi Primary School," "Pui Ching Branch School" (1908–24), and "Spiritual Guidance Girls' School" (1913-31). They also purchased boats to help fishermen's children learn to read, and to transport food and supplies to leprosy hospitals in inland areas.

In 1927, using a gift from Reverend Rev. Charlton Todd's mother, the church purchased the site of the present-day Baimahang, naming it "Todd Memorial Hall". It was an old mansion at No. 9 White Horse Lane (the then address). The main hall had two hundred seats, as well as rooms and a vacant lot behind it. The site is the current location of the Macau Baptist Church.

During the War of Resistance against Japan, many people migrated to Macau, leading to a flourishing church. In 1945, as many as 600 people attended Sunday worship services. Reverend Galloway served the church for 42 years, retiring in 1949 but remaining in Macau until his death in 1968 at the age of 91.

In 1951, the church demolished its original building at Rua do Campo, and a new church was completed in 1953; the same year, the Lower Rua site was opened. In the autumn of 1955, a Baptist secondary school was established.

In 1964, an average of about 150 people attended Sunday worship services each week. On May 17, 1965, the "Macau Baptist Convention" was officially established.

In 1970, Macau Baptist Church had three schools, located in Rua do Campo and Lower Rua do Campo.

From 1992 to 1995, the church collaborated with the Western Mission and the Mong Kok Baptist Church in Hong Kong to conduct evangelistic ministry in the San Po area.

In 1994, the church celebrated its 90th anniversary, and Reverend Wong Chung was invited back from the United States to Macau to plan the construction and expansion of the church. In 1995, "Macau Baptist Secondary School" joined the free education network.

In 2002, the new campus of "Macau Baptist Secondary School" in Rua do Campo was completed, and the opening ceremony was held on November 22.

In 2008, there were several hundred church members residing in Macau, and about two hundred people attended Sunday worship services regularly.

== Affiliated institutions ==
The church's affiliated institutions include a secondary school (the Macau Baptist College) and the Macau Bible Institute, as well as a Baptist bookstore, a kindergarten and a primary school.

== See also ==
- Macau Baptist Convention
- Christianity in Macau
- Macau Bible Institute
