= Union of Christian Evangelical Churches in Macau =

The Union of Christian Evangelical Churches in Macau (Chinese: 澳門基督教聯會，Portuguese: União das Igrejas Cristãs Evangélicas de Macau), or Macau Christian Union, is a Protestant cross-denominational organization in Macau. It was founded in 1990 with local Christian churches and organizations as its membership base. Currently, there are over sixty member churches and organizations.

== History ==
The Union of Christian Evangelical Churches in Macau was founded in 1990 with local Christian churches and organizations as its membership base. Church leaders from Hong Kong were specially invited to witness this historic moment.

On November 12, 1991, the Union was officially gazetted by the Macau Government. The Union headquarters was located in the territory of Macau, at Rua de Ferreira do Amaral, number fifteen, ground floor.

In 2004, the Union's address was Unit B, 2nd Floor, Murray House, No. 23 Rua Nova da Guia, Macau.

In 2017, the Union was located at G/F, Zhi'an Building, 2A Rua do Campo, Macau. There were more than 30 churches and more than 30 organizations under the Union's umbrella.

In 2020, the Union held its 30th anniversary Thanksgiving Worship Ceremony.

== Purpose and ministry ==
The purpose of the Union of Christian Evangelical Churches in Macau is to promote unity among Christians and to connect Christian churches and organizations within and outside Macau, and to promote evangelistic ministry.

The ministry activities include preaching, publishing, medical care, education, charity, student Gospel fellowship, community and elderly services, etc. And there is close relationship with Christian organizations in Hong Kong and Guangdong Province.

== Outline of faith ==
According to the constitution of the Union of Christian Evangelical Churches in Macau, its belief framework is as follows:

1. We believe in the one and only God, the Triune Father, Son, and Holy Spirit, who are eternally one in glory, body, and power. The Father is the Creator, maintainer, and ruler of all things, visible and invisible, in the entire universe.

2. We believe in the Son, Jesus Christ. The Son, born of the Virgin Mary, moved by the Holy Spirit, became human, died on the cross to atone for the sins of mankind, rose again on the third day, ascended to heaven, and sits at the right hand of the Father. He will return in glory to judge the living and the dead.

3. We believe in the Holy Spirit. The Holy Spirit enables people to recognize their sins, repent, be born again, believe in God, know the truth, and dwell in the hearts of believers, empowering them to live a life that glorifies God and benefits others.

4. We believe that man was created in God's image. From the first sin, we became sinners, unable to save ourselves. Salvation is attained through faith in the redemption of the precious blood of Jesus Christ on the cross.

5. We believe that the sixty-six books of the Old and New Testaments were inspired by the Holy Spirit, encompassing all the essential means of salvation and serving as the highest standard for the moral life and conduct of believers.

6. We believe that the holy and catholic Church, established by Jesus Christ, is composed of those who believe in Jesus as Savior. Christ is the head of the Church, and believers are united in the Lord through worship, fellowship, preaching, communion, and witnessing.

== Organization ==
The highest decision-making body of the Union is the General Assembly of Members, which convenes at least once a year. Under the General Assembly are the Executive Committee and the Supervisory Committee. The Executive Committee generally meets monthly.

Any Christian church or organization in Macau that is a legally registered association with the Macau government and is willing to abide by the constitution of this Union may apply to join in. By the year of 2017, Macau had about 80 churches with a little over 8,000 believers. The Union of Christian Evangelical Churches in Macau was composed of more than 60 churches and evangelical organizations.

== See also ==
- Religion in Macau
- Hong Kong Chinese Christian Churches Union
- Macau Bible Institute
