= Nanchang Zhidao Church =

Church in Nanchang, Jiangxi, China

- 南昌志道堂
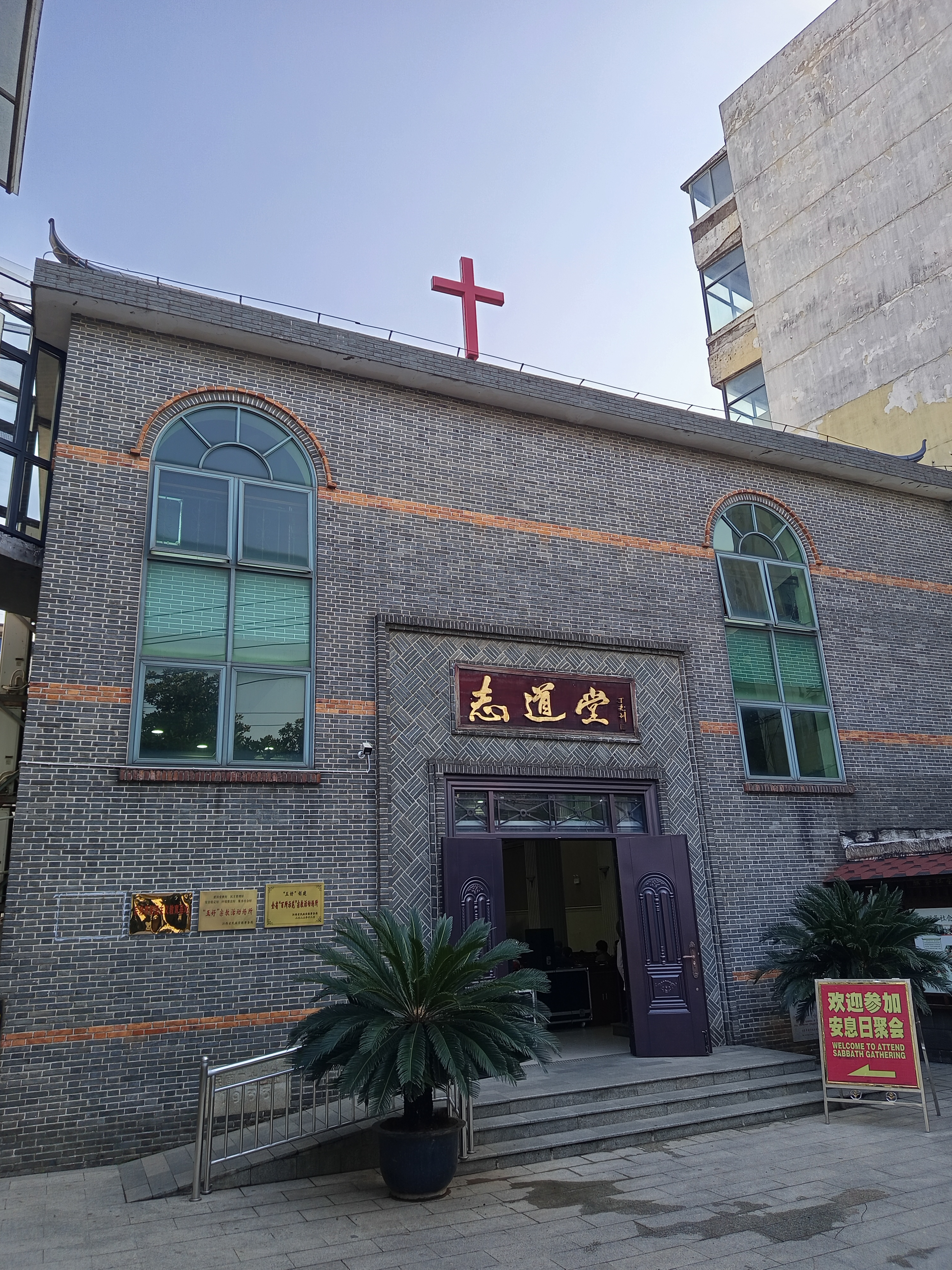
- Nanchang Zhidao Church (2025)

Religion
- Affiliation: Protestantism

Location
- Location: Nanchang, Jiangxi
- Country: People's Republic of China
- Interactive map of Nanchang Zhidao Church

Architecture
- Established: 1897
- Completed: 1933

Nanchang Zhidao Church (Chinese: 南昌志道堂; pinyin: Nánchāng Zhìdàotáng; lit. 'Nanchang determine (to follow the God's) Words'), shortly Zhidao Church or Zhidao Tang, is one of the main Christian churches in Nanchang City, and the mother church of the Jiangxi Provincial Bible School. It is located at No. 112 Minde Road.

== History ==
In 1897, Christian Gospel was introduced to Nanchang, the provincial capital city of Jiangxi.

In 1933, Zhidao Church was built in Nanchang by the missionaries from the Wesleyan Methodist Church. It was in a Western architectural style, facing lakes in the front and back, and a park in the east.

In 1958, all Christians in Nanchang started joint worship services at Bu'en Church at Yingtian Temple. And Zhidao Church was occupied by a factory.

During the Cultural Revolution (1966-1976), all the churches in Nanchang were closed. After that, the government implemented freer religion policies and returned the properties to Zhidao Church together with a donation of 15,000 RMB. The members of the church also actively donated for renovation of the buildings.

On the Christmas Day of 1982, Zhidao Church held a reopening ceremony and became the first Christian church to resume worship in Nanchang. At that time, the church only had dozens of believers.

In 2006, the church started another major renovation in the original architectural style. The project was completed in the following year and an inauguration ceremony was held on November 28, 2007.

By 2015, the number of believers had developed to over 50,000. And the church held three worship services every Sunday.

== Architecture ==
Zhidao Church is surrounded by lakes in front and back and a park on the right. It covers a land area of 1,500 square meters with a building area of nearly 1,000 square meters, allowing more than 1,000 people to worship at the same time.

The architecture is in a combination of western and Chinese palace style, with flying eaves, arched corners, and red tiled roofs.

== Bible school ==
In the early days, from 1992 to 1996, Jiangxi Holy Bible School borrowed a small attic in Nanchang Zhidao Church as a classroom. The Sunday offerings of the church on the last week of each month were the source of funds for the school. Now, the school has grown into a theological college with its own campus at Grace Hill, Xinjian County, Nanchang City.

== Chi Tao Church ==
There are some other churches sharing the Chinese name of Zhidao Church, including the Ji Dou Church (志道堂) in Macau and the Chi Tao Church in Hong Kong, both are under the Church of Christ in China (中華基督教會).
