= Macau Baptist Convention =

Chinese name
- Traditional Chinese: 澳門浸信會聯會
Transcriptions
Standard Mandarin
- Hanyu Pinyin: ào mén jìn xìn huì lián huì
Yue: Cantonese
- Jyutping: ou3 mun4 zam3 seon3 wui6 lyun4 wui6

Portuguese name
- Portuguese: Convenção Baptista de Macau

The Macau Baptist Convention (Abbr: MBC) is a Baptist Christian denomination in the Macau Special Administrative Region of the People's Republic of China. It is a member of the Baptist World Alliance.

== History ==
It can trace its origins to the work established by the Triennial Convention missionaries, John and Henrietta Shuck, in 1835. The first Baptist church was, however, only set up in 1905 when the Macau Baptist Church was planted by Charlton Todd. A building was purchased in 1927 at the Rua Pedro Nolasco da Silva to house its congregation and is today also the headquarters of the MBC.

In 1952, the Macau Baptist Mission was founded.

According to a census published by the association in 2023, it claimed 6 churches and 750 members.

== See also ==
- Christianity in China
- Christianity in Macau
- Asia Pacific Baptist Federation
- Baptist World Alliance
