= IIUM =

IIUM may refer to:

- International Islamic University Malaysia (IIUM)
- Macau Inter-University Institute (IIUM), already renamed as University of Saint Joseph since 2009.

For Isles Internationale Universite in Malaysia, also called Isles International University in Malaysia, see Isles International University.
