= USJ =

USJ can mean:

- Universal Studios Japan
- UEP Subang Jaya
- Université Saint-Joseph, a Lebanese private university founded in 1875
- University of Saint Joseph, a university in Macau
- United States of Japan, a fictional revolutionary Japan from the anime series Code Geass: Lelouch of the Rebellion
- Unforeseen Simulation Joint, a fictional arena used to train heroes for rescuing people in natural disasters "My Hero Academia"
- Urban Studies (journal)
