= Islam in Macau =

Islam is a minority religion in Macau. According to the Islamic Union of Hong Kong, together with all of the foreign Muslim workers combined (such as from Bangladesh, India, Indonesia and Pakistan), there are around 10,000 Muslims in Macau. Only around 400 are local Macanese people, and they are collective known as The Macau Islamic Society.

== History ==
=== Yuan Dynasty ===
Islam has been present in Macau since the Yuan Dynasty. It is generally accepted that Islam was brought to Macau by traders from the Middle East and Persia during that time until the Qing Dynasty era. Some of this evidence can be found at the Muslim Cemetery nearby Macau Mosque where some of the tombs date back to hundreds of years ago.

=== Portuguese Macau ===
During the Portuguese rule of Macau, many Muslims came from South Asia with the Portuguese Army. In the 1880s, they founded a Mosque for their prayer place.

During World War II, many Hui people escaped to then-Portuguese Macau from the Republic of China to avoid the devastation from the war. Many of them are from Zhaoqing in Guangdong province. However, many of them moved to Hong Kong after the end of the war. Some Muslims also came to Macau from Northwest China after the end of Chinese Civil War in 1949.

Before the Macau handover from Portugal to China in 1999, the Islamic Union of Hong Kong used to provide about HK$150,000 to support the Muslim community in Macau.

=== Macau SAR ===
Over the past ten years, the Muslim community in Macau has grown to more than 10,000 with the arrival of Muslim workers from South and South East Asia, working at various sectors in Macau.

== Mosque ==
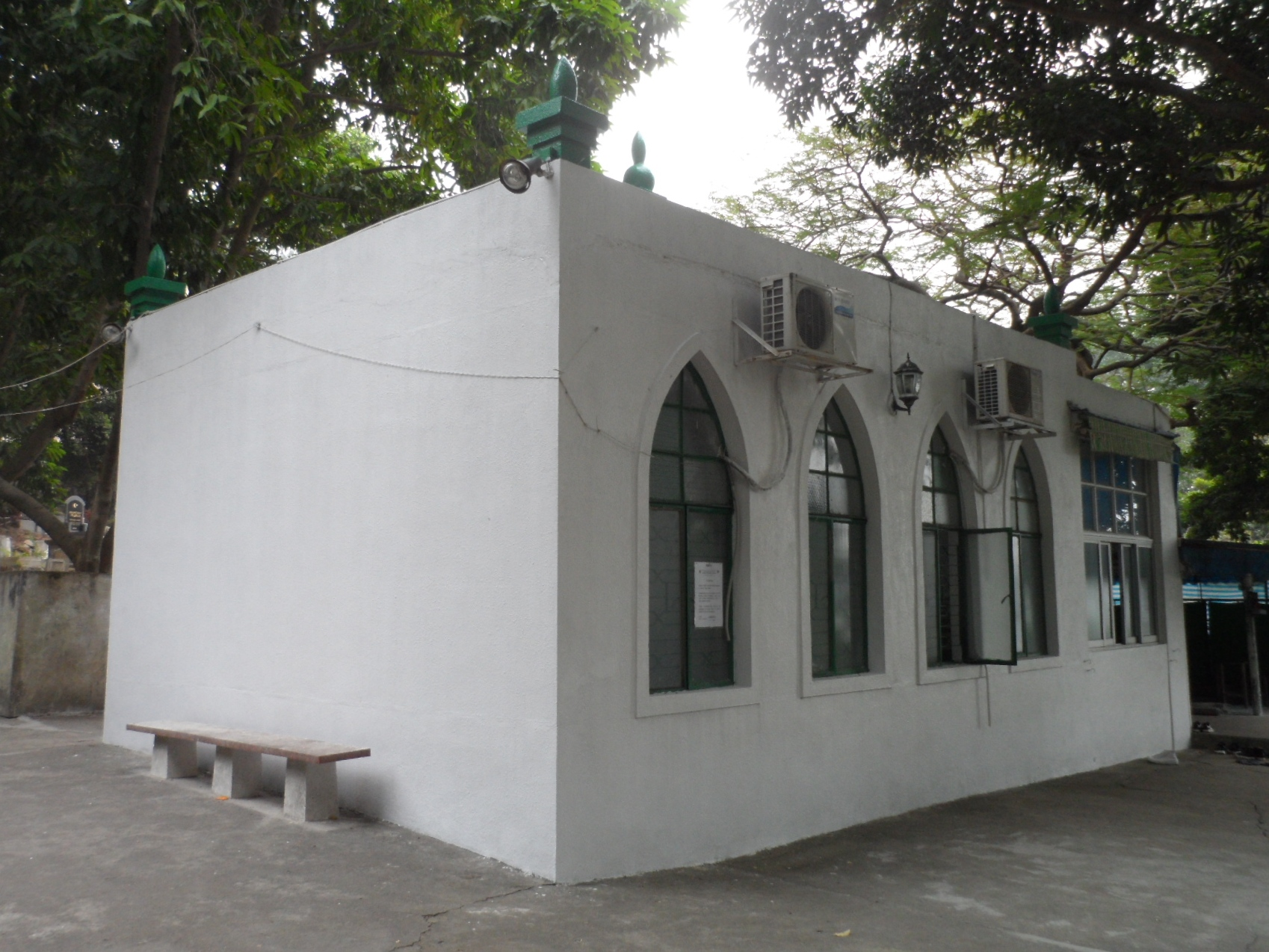
Macau Mosque

Macau currently has one mosque, which is the Macau Mosque, located at 4 Ramal Dos Moros in Our Lady of Fatima Parish. The mosque was built in the 1980s by the Muslim people from the second wave of immigrants during the Portuguese rule of Macau. This mosque is especially crowded during Sunday where most of the employees have their work break days.

In 2024, numerous news articles reported that new Mosque will be built soon.

== Festivities ==
Every year during Eid al-Adha, Muslims in Macau gather at Macau Mosque to celebrate the Muslim festivity by performing prayer and animal slaughtering for the needy and poor. The same thing also happen during the annual Eid al-Fitr celebration which is held at the mosque.

== Cemetery ==
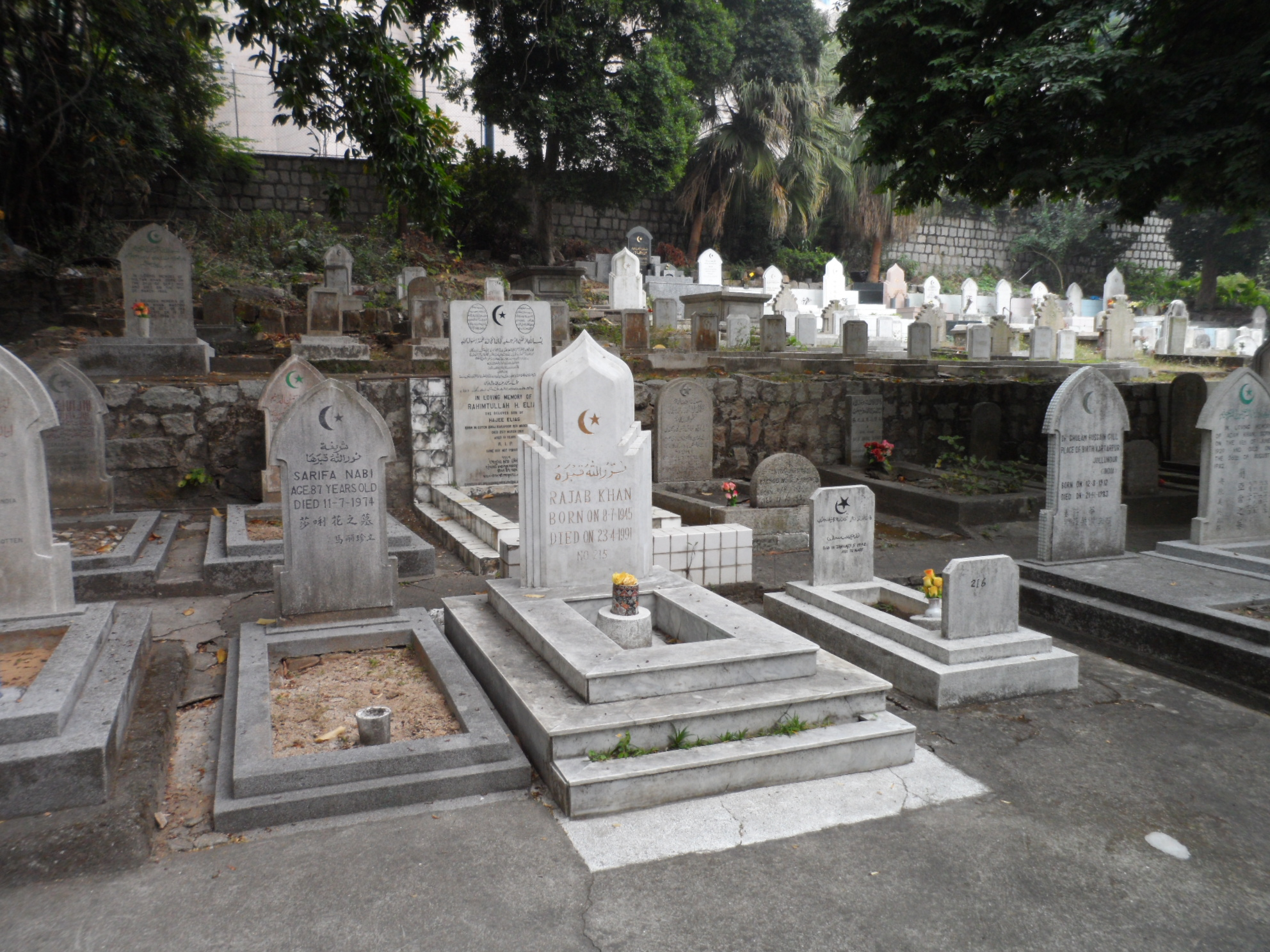
Macau Muslim Cemetery

Macau has one Muslim cemetery. Built in 1854, it is located within the same area as Macau Mosque. Some of the tombstones' styles are of Persian origin with writing in Farsi, Arabic, Chinese, English and Portuguese. Some of the tombs date back to hundreds of years ago. The cemetery consists of around 120 graves.

== Cuisine ==
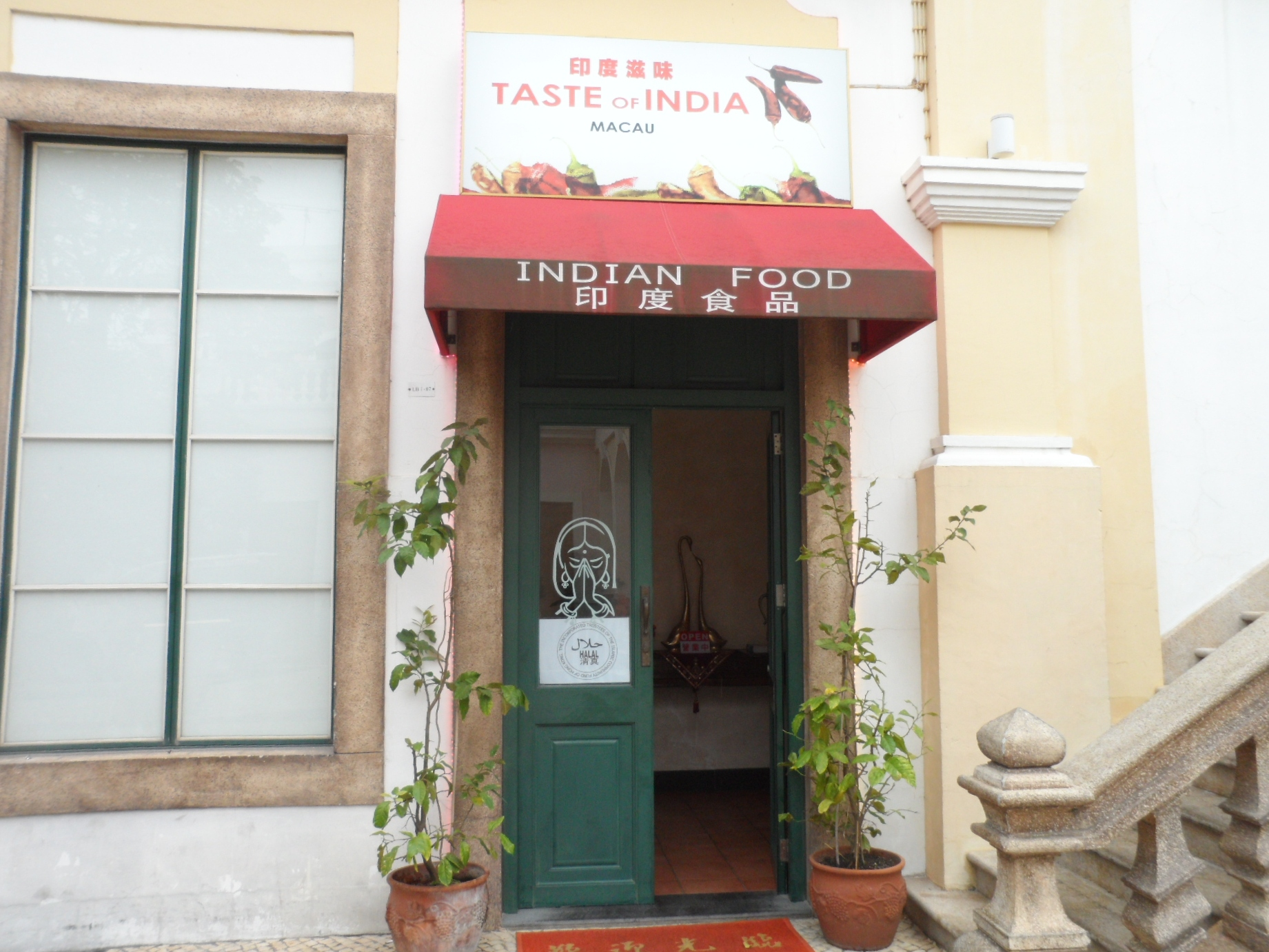
Macau first Halal restaurant

As of January 2015, there are five Halal restaurants and shops selling Halal food in Macau, both on the Macau Peninsula and Taipa. Macau's first Halal restaurant was launched in 2012, called the Taste of India at Macau Fisherman's Wharf, serving Halal Indian and Portuguese cuisines. It took them three years to obtain the Halal certification.

== Muslim/ Islamic organizations ==
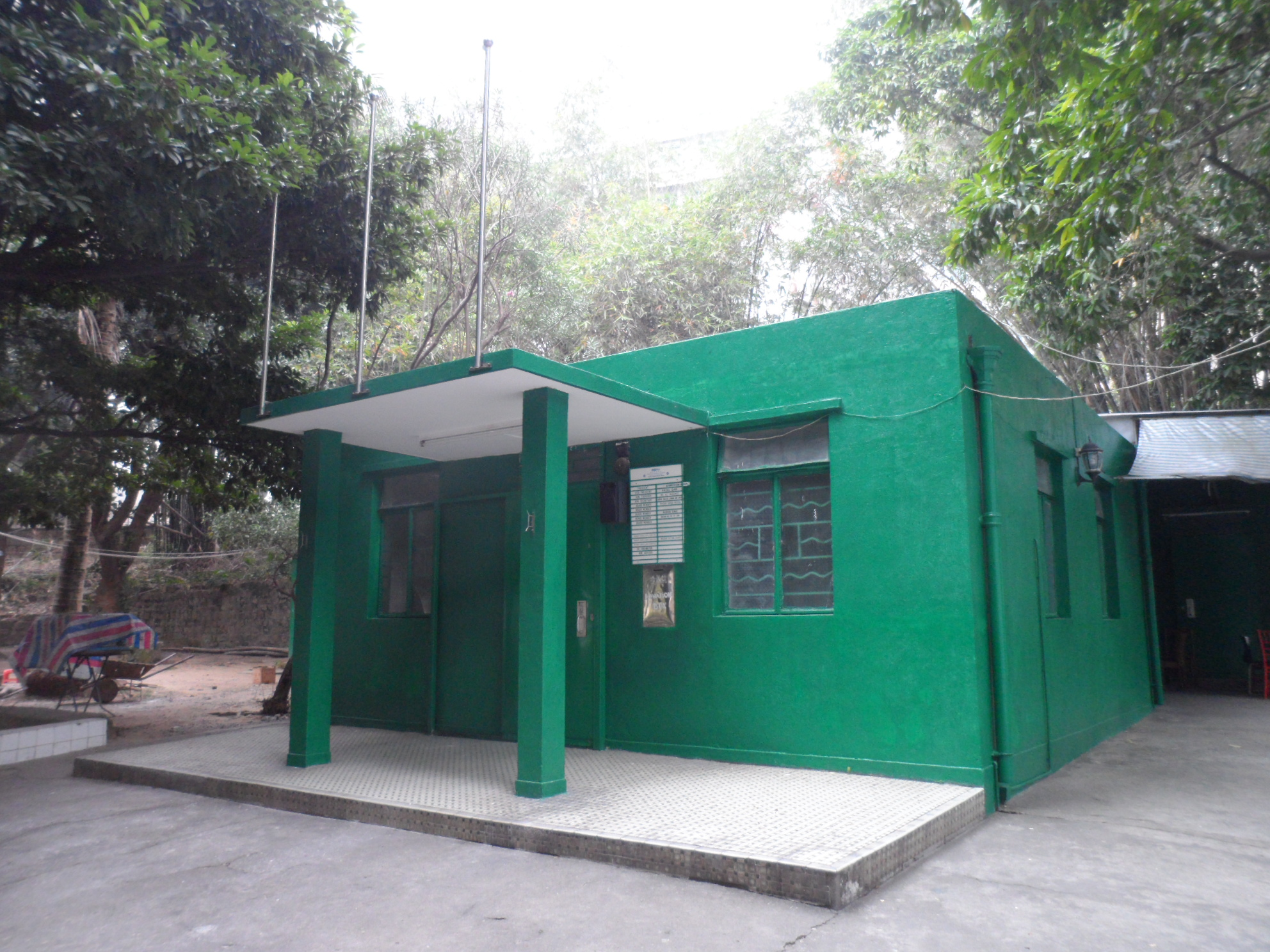
Islamic Association of Macau headquarters

=== Islamic Association of Macau ===
The Islamic Association of Macau (IAM; Chinese: 澳門伊斯蘭會; Portuguese: Associação Islâmica de Macau) is an Islamic organization in Macau founded in 1935. The headquarters of the organization is at the Macau Mosque. The Islamic Union of Hong Kong in Hong Kong provides annual budget and subsidy to the IAM so that the association support Muslims in Macau and to propagate Islam in the region. The current President of IAM is Ahmed Din Khan and the Vice President is Fazal Dad.

=== Peduli Indonesian Migrant Workers Concern Group ===
The Peduli Indonesian Migrant Workers Concern Group was established in 2009 in Macau. The group assists the Indonesian workers in Macau, such as explaining about Macau immigration law, employment documents translation etc. The group currently has around 350 members. It offers English classes, computer courses and holds many activities, such as visits to elderly homes, AIDS campaigns, hip-hop competitions, etc.

== Tourism ==
To attract more Muslim tourists from Southeast Asia, the Macau Government Tourism Office has been engaging in several efforts to give a new perception that Macau is not only a gaming region. Over the past two years, the government has been engaging in seminars on Muslim practices during travel, encouraging more restaurants to get halal certification from Hong Kong and requesting hotels to reconstructing their lobby so that visitors do not have to go through casinos when going to restaurants or their rooms.

== Contemporary issues ==
Muslims in Macau are often faced with time availability to pray, because most of them time they have only one break during their working period, which is not enough to hold two daily prayers. Some Muslim women workers also sometimes face difficulties to keep wearing their veil during working time, although this has never been a major issues in Macau.

== See also ==
- Islam in Hong Kong
- Islam in Sichuan
- Islam in Taiwan
- Religion in Macau
