= Fanny Vong =

Macanese scholar and educator

Fanny Vong Chuk Kwan
- Born: Macau
- Occupations: President, Institute for Tourism Studies

Academic background
- Education: University of Macau

Academic work
- Discipline: Business administration
- Sub-discipline: Tourism and gambling

Fanny Vong Chuk Kwan is a Macau teacher and scholar, specializing in studying the tourism and gambling industry in Macau. She has been the president of the Institute for Tourism Studies in Macau since 2001. Vong occupies several significant government offices in relation to Macau's tourism industry, including sitting on the Tourism Development Committee, the Cultural Industry Committee, the Talent Development Committee, and the Guangdong-Macau Development Strategies Group. In 2020, Macau Business listed her as one of the 20 most influential women in Macau. She has published widely on tourism development and management, focusing especially on the impact of tourism for gambling in Macau.

== Biography ==
Vong was born in Macau, and completed her bachelor's and master's degree in business administration from the University of Macau. She completed her doctorate in business organisation and management from the Instituto Superior de Ciências do Trabalho e da Empresa in Portugal, and also conducted research at Stockholm University while she was there. She speaks Cantonese, Mandarin and English.

== Career ==
Vong was a lecturer at the University of Macau, and joined the Institute for Tourism Studies in Macau in 1999, becoming the president of the institute in 2001. During her time there, she has established the institute's post-doctoral program, including master's, doctoral, and post-graduate diploma programs.

Vong also plays a significant role in developing Macau's tourism industry. She is part of the Macau government's Tourism Development Committee, the Cultural Industry Committee, the Talent Development Committee, and the Guangdong-Macau Development Strategies Group. She is also a member of the management board of the Pacific Asia Travel Association.

She has published widely on the development of tourism as an industry, and her research has studied, among other things, the impact of the gambling industry on Macau residents, the psychology of gambling tourists in China, and the impact of regulation on the gambling industry in Macau.

In 2020, Macau Business listed her as one of the 20 most influential women in Macau.
