= List of universities and colleges in Macau =

Macau is a city of tourism with a multicultural blend which provides a broad sense and international perspective for its college students. The academic atmosphere and its foundation in culture have also created favorable conditions for higher education. Most of the curricula, teachers and the general quality of teaching have reached an internationally accepted level.

Mainly English or Chinese (or both) are the languages of instruction in universities; some courses or programs are conducted in Portuguese.

The following is a list of universities, polytechnics and other advanced level (higher) education and research institutions in Macau.

Name	Portuguese	Chinese	Type
University of Macau	Universidade de Macau	澳門大學	Public
Macao Polytechnic University	Universidade Politécnica de Macau	澳門理工大學	Public
Macao University of Tourism	Universidade de Turismo de Macau	澳門旅遊大學	Public
Academy of Public Security Forces	Escola Superior das Forças de Segurança de Macau	澳門保安部隊高等學校	Public
Macau University of Science and Technology	Universidade de Ciência e Tecnologia de Macau	澳門科技大學	Private
City University of Macau	Universidade da Cidade de Macau	澳門城市大學	Private
University of Saint Joseph	Universidade de São José	聖若瑟大學	Private
Kiang Wu Nursing College of Macau	Instituto de Enfermagem Kiang Wu de Macau	澳門鏡湖護理學院	Private
Macau Institute of Management	Instituto de Gestão de Macau	澳門管理學院	Private
Macau Millennium College	Instituto Milénio de Macau	中西創新學院	Private
Institute of European Studies of Macau	Instituto de Estudos Europeus de Macau	澳門歐洲研究學會	Private organization
United Nations University Institute in Macao	Instituto de Macau da Universidade das Nações Unidas	聯合國大學國際軟件技術研究所	United Nations University
Macau Bible Institute	Instituto Bíblico de Macau	澳門聖經學院	Private

== See also ==
- Education in Macau
- List of higher education institutions in Hong Kong
- Lists of universities and colleges by country
- Lists of universities and colleges
