= Macau Bible Institute =

- (Chinese: 澳門聖經學院)
- Motto: 2 Timothy 2: 15 - "Do your best to present yourself to God as one approved, a worker who does not need to be ashamed and who correctly handles the word of truth."
- Type: Seminary
- Established: 1982
- President: Yang Huaien (Chinese: 楊懷恩)
- Location: 6 Rua de Abreu Nunes, Edf. Iao Luen, M2, Macau
- Website: https://www.macaubible.org/eng/

Macau Bible Institute (MBI; Chinese: 澳門聖經學院; Portuguese: Instituto Bíblico de Macau), also called "Sino-Macau Bible College", is a Protestant non-denominational seminary in Macau, China. It was founded in 1982 as the first evangelical seminary in the region. MBI's mission was to provide theological education and pastoral training to support the growth of churches in China mainland, later adjusted to focused on missionary training in Macau. The school is an accredited member of the Asia Theological Association, offering programs at Bachelor, Master and Diploma levels. Graduates of MBI are serving in churches throughout Macau, as well as in Hong Kong, mainland China, and other places.

== History ==
In 1982, shortly after China’s Reform and opening-up started, Macau Bible Institute was founded on leased premises on Rua de Loi Sen in Macau. It was the first non-denominational Protestant seminary in the region. Rev. Paul Chi was appointed the first present. In its inaugural year, MBI enrolled 16 students, half of whom were new immigrants from China mainland.

In 1987, the Bachelor of Theology program was launched. During the 1980s, the seminary operated with a strong emphasis on training lay leaders and evangelists for both local and cross-border ministry.

In the 1992, the Master of Arts in Urban Missions and Pastoral Ministry Program was launched.

In 1999, Macau's sovereignty was returned to China. In addition to continuing its mission of training preachers for Macau, the institute launched Christian teacher training, pastoral partnership, and evangelistic training ministries.

In 2004, the school became a member of the Asia Theological Association.

In 2009, the school transformed from a traditional seminary into a missionary institution, focusing on training Chinese mission workers. And student numbers increased from under 40 to over 80.

In 2015, the Macao Theological Education Center was established, a three-year Master of Divinity program was officially launched.

By the year 2019, the school had nurtured almost 200 graduates, who work in the churches and ministries of Macau and Hong Kong.

In 2020, the school moved to its present address at 6 Rua de Abreu Nunes, Edf. Iao Luen, Macau.

In 2024, Pastor Yang Huaien (Chinese: 楊懷恩) became the acting president.

== Academic Programs ==
Macau Bible Institute offers a range of theological and ministry training programs, including

- Bachelor of Theology
- Master of Arts in Christian Study
- Graduate Diploma
- Christian Ministry Diploma,

all accredited by the Asia Theological Association.

== Mission and Impact ==
When founded, Macau Bible Institute's mission was mainly to equip believers for effective ministry in the China mainland. The focus has then moved to Macau. As of the late 2010s, Macau had around 10,000 Protestant Christians, with approximately 5,000 attending churches on Sundays. MBI-trained leaders serve across various denominations, including the Christian Missionary Alliance, Baptists, Anglicans, and the Church of Christ in China.

At present, alumni of the institute are found in churches of all sizes throughout Macau. They also serve in Hong Kong, mainland China, and other missionary fields.

== Library ==
The school library has a collection of 19,000 Chinese and English volumes. In addition, there are periodicals, magazines, audio tapes and DVDs, etc. Macau Bible Institute Library is the only theological library open to believers and missionaries in Macau.

== Other information ==
- Macau Bible Institute is a member of the Asia Theological Association.
- Campus address: 6 Rua de Abreu Nunes, Edf. Iao Luen, M2, Macau. Library: 23 Rua Nova a Guia, Merry Court, 2/H, Macau.
- Macau Bible Institute regularly publishes its school newsletters.

== See also ==
- List of universities and colleges in Macau
- List of evangelical seminaries and theological colleges
- St. Joseph's Seminary and Church
- Religion in Macau
- Union of Christian Evangelical Churches in Macau
