= Macao University of Tourism =

Public university in Macau

- 澳門旅遊大學; Universidade de Turismo de Macau
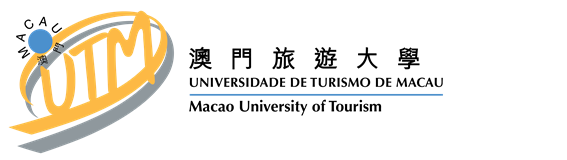
- Former names: Macao Institute for Tourism Studies (–2024)
- Type: Public
- Established: 1995; 31 years ago
- Affiliations: GHMUA
- President: Fanny Vong, Ph.D
- Location: Macau
- Website: www.utm.edu.mo

Chinese name
- Traditional Chinese: 澳門旅遊大學
- Simplified Chinese: 澳门旅游大学
Transcriptions
Standard Mandarin
- Hanyu Pinyin: Àomén Lǚyóu Dàxué
Yue: Cantonese
- Yale Romanization: Oumún Léuihyàuh Daaihhohk

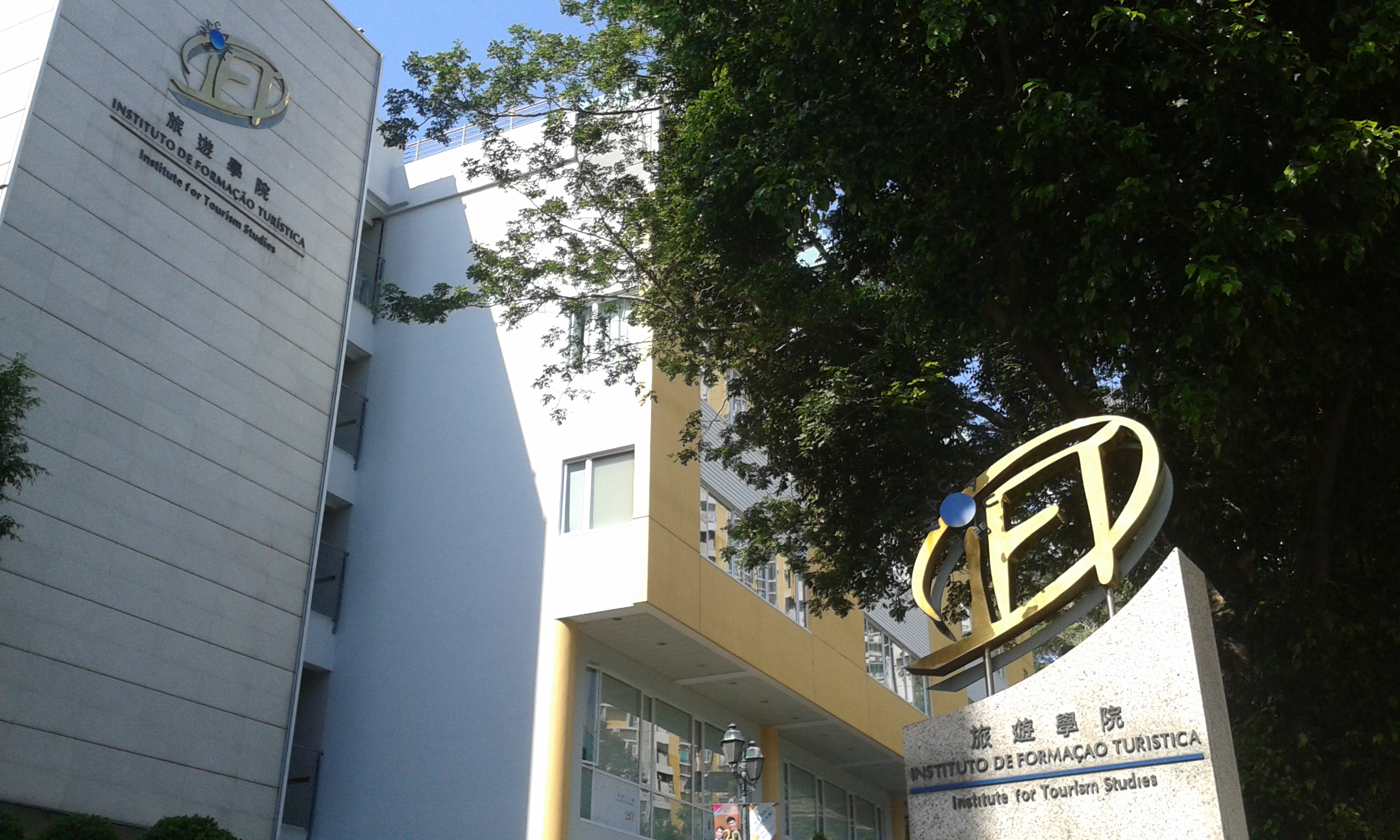
Entrance of the Macao University of Tourism

The Macao University of Tourism (UTM), formerly the Macao Institute for Tourism Studies (IFTM), is a public university in Macau with campuses in Mong-Há and Taipa. The university offers degrees in tourism, heritage and hospitality

== History ==
The institution was in 1995 as the Institute for Tourism Studies (Chinese: 旅遊學院; Portuguese: Instituto de Formação Turística). Fanny Vong has been the Rector of the institution since 2001.

The institution adopted its current designation of Macao University of Tourism on 1 April 2024.

== Former Academic Units ==
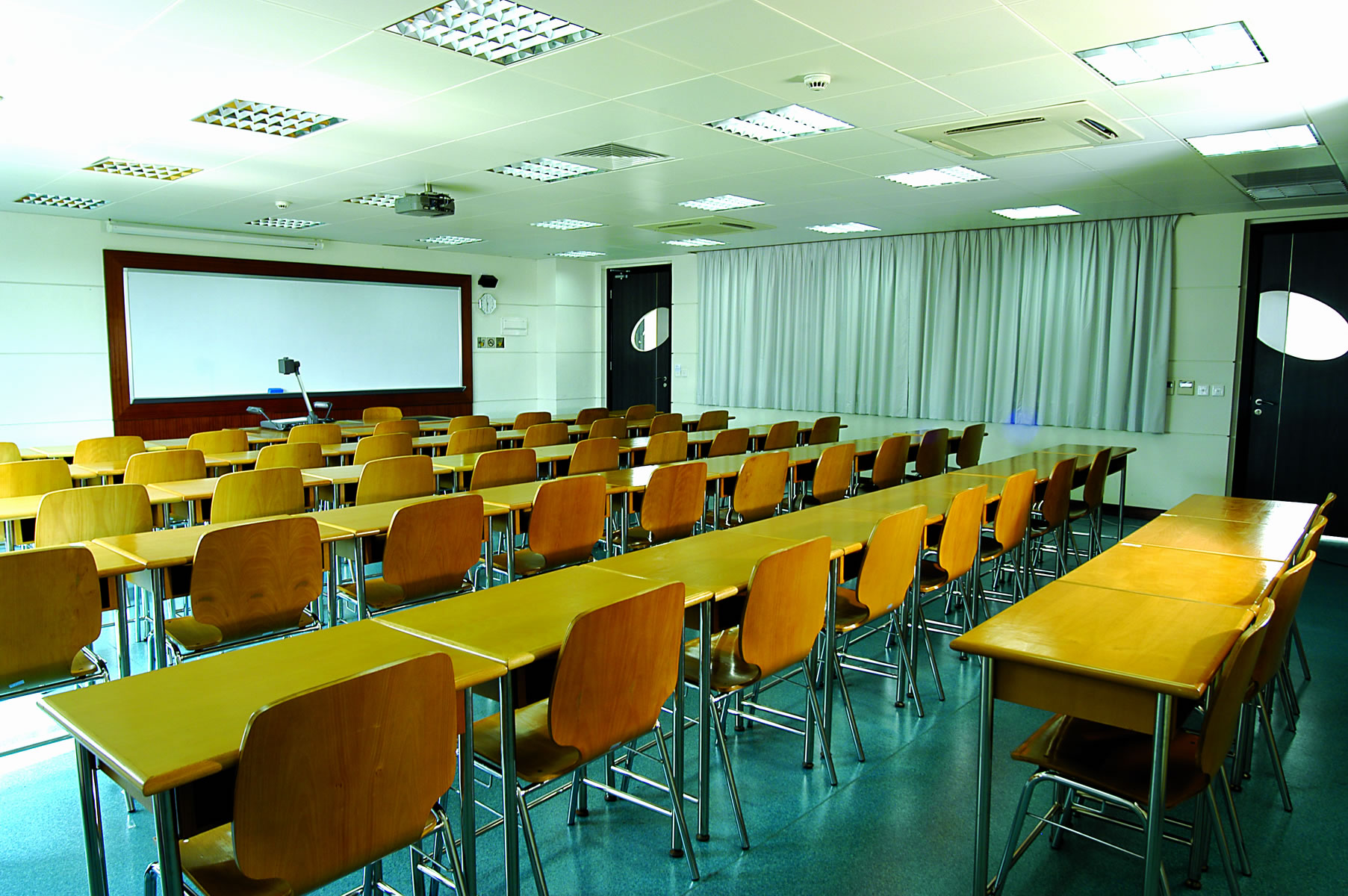
One of the classrooms in Inspiration Building

=== EST (Tourism College) ===
The Tourism College, one of the schools of the Institute for Tourism Studies, offers the following four-year bachelor's degree Programmes:

1. Bachelor of Arts in Culinary Arts Management,
2. Bachelor of Science in Tourism Business Management,
3. Bachelor of Science in Heritage Management,
4. Bachelor of Science in Hotel Management,
5. Bachelor of Science in Tourism Event Management,
6. Bachelor of Science in Tourism Retail and Marketing Management.

Besides accepting local and international students, it also receives exchange students for a one-semester study.

=== ETIH (Tourism and Hotel School) ===
Tourism and Hotel School was initially established in 1982 and reported to the Macao Government Tourist Office. The school started with a small teaching body of 7 and offered 2 courses, namely, Reception and Housekeeping, at its temporary premises located next to the Pousada de Mong-Há. In the following years, more courses were added to the list such as culinary, languages and tour guiding.

In 1993, as a strategy to support tourism development, Macao government decided to create a higher education institute which would focus only on tourism education and training. A committee was established to carry out its preparation works, and 2 years later, in 1995, the Institute for Tourism Studies was born. At the same time, Tourism and Hotel School was integrated to the institute.

== Campus ==
The Campus of UTM can be divided into the Mong-Há campus and the Taipa campus.

=== Mong-Há Campus ===
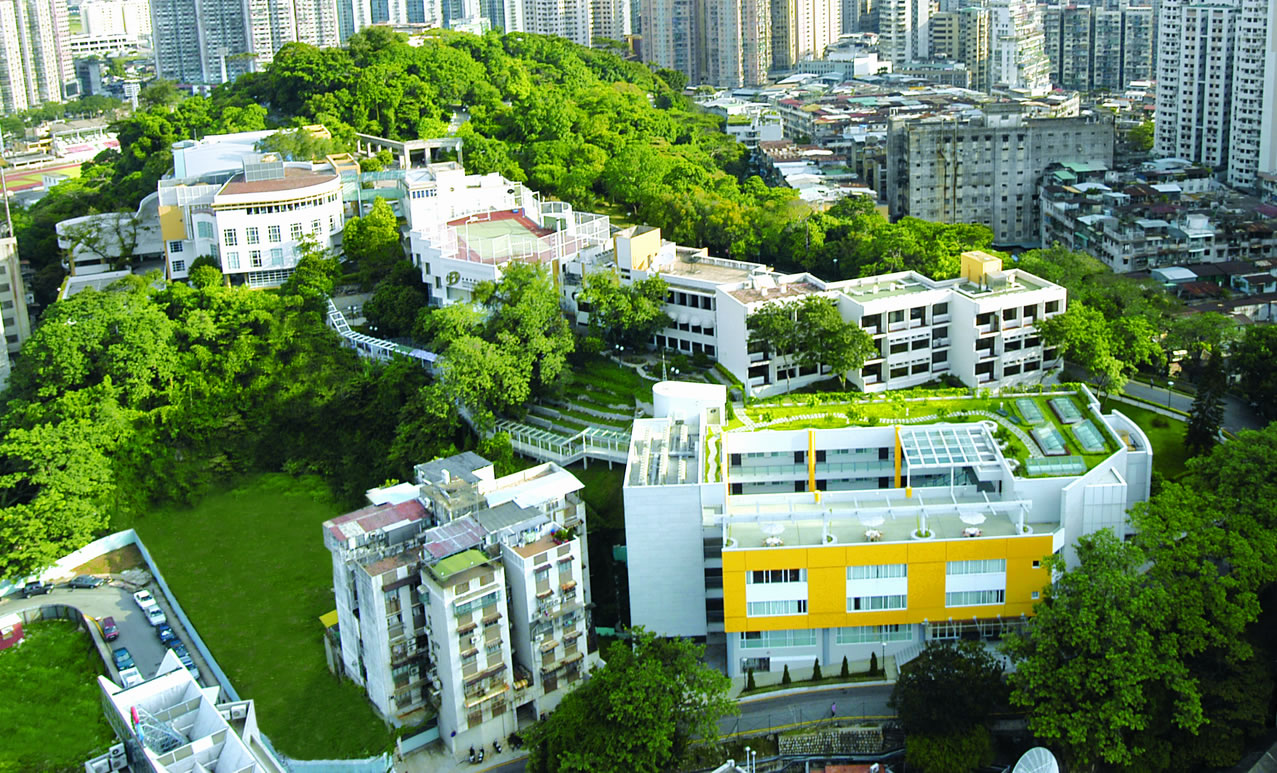
The main campus of IFT

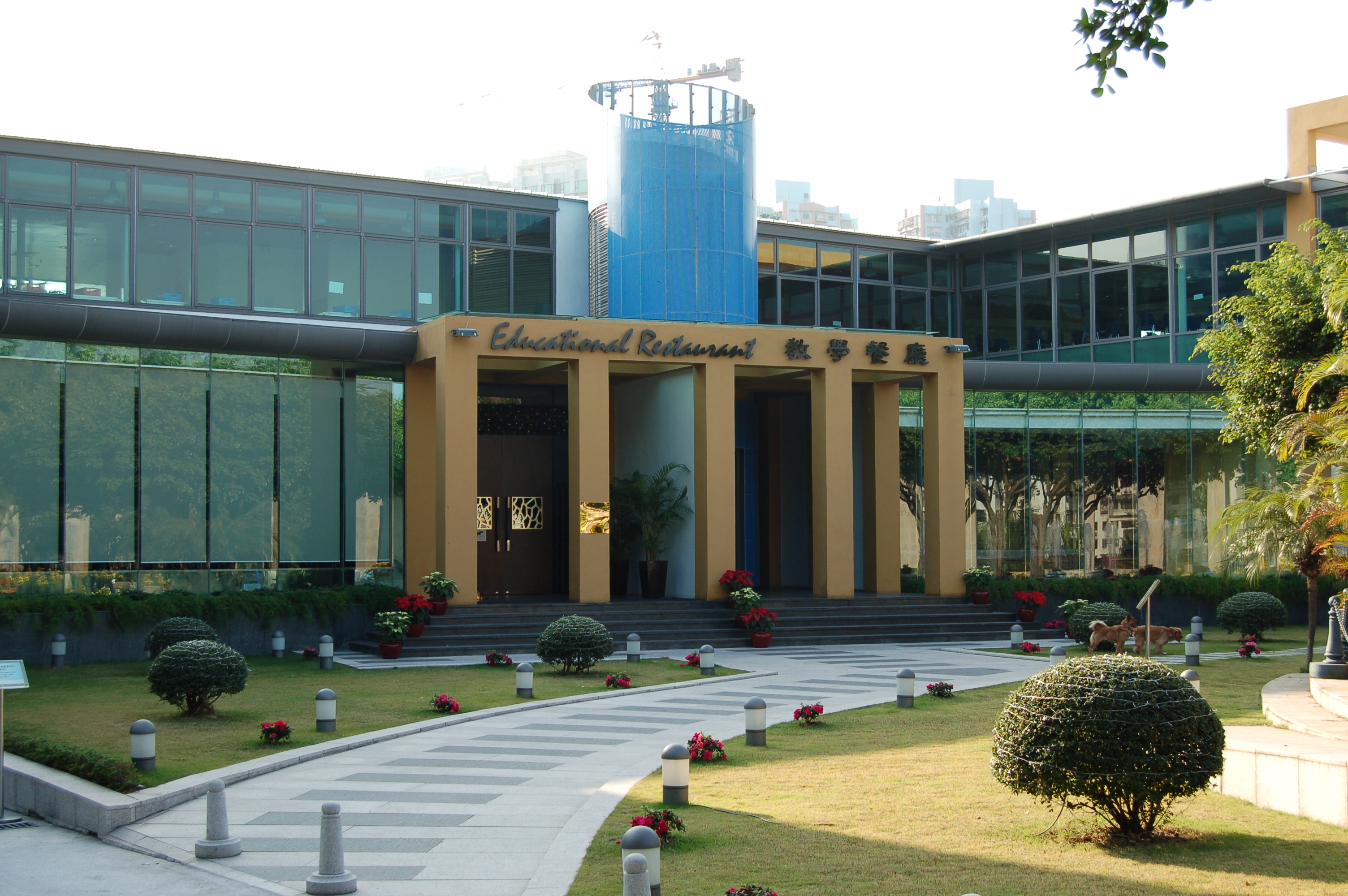
Building of Educational Restaurant

- Inspiration Building (啟思樓)
- Pousada de Mong-Há (望廈賓館)
- Team Building (協力樓)
- Educational Restaurant (教學餐廳)

=== Taipa Campus ===
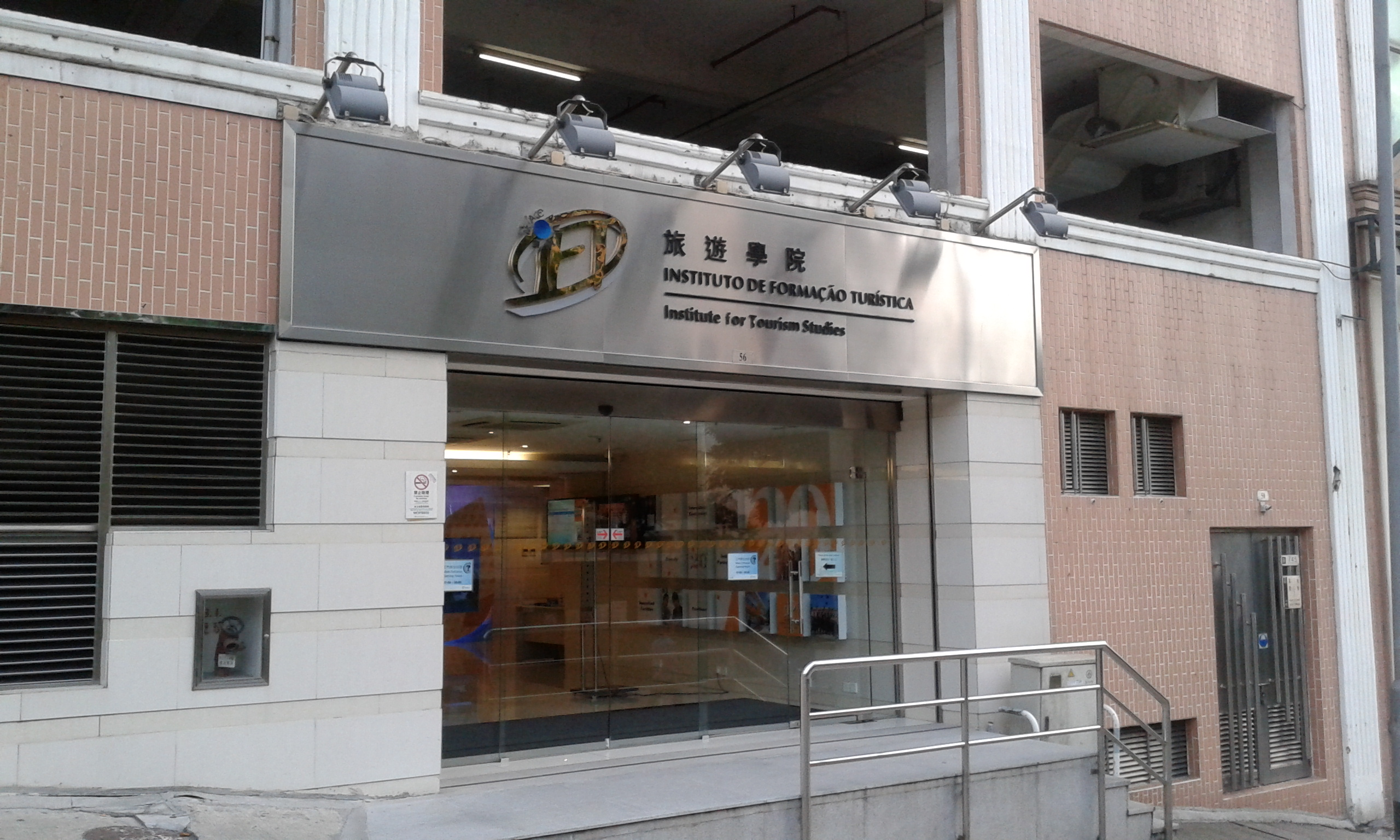
Old IFT Taipa Campus

- Forward Building (展望樓)
- East Asia Hall (東亞樓)
  - It is a student dormitory
- Yiu Tung Building (耀東樓)
- Educational Residence (住宿教學樓)

== See also ==
- List of universities and colleges in Macau
