= Macau Mosque and Cemetery =

Mosque and cemetery in Nossa Senhora de Fátima, Macau, China

- 澳門伊斯蘭清真寺及墳場 (Chinese); Mesquita e Cemitério de Macau (Portuguese)
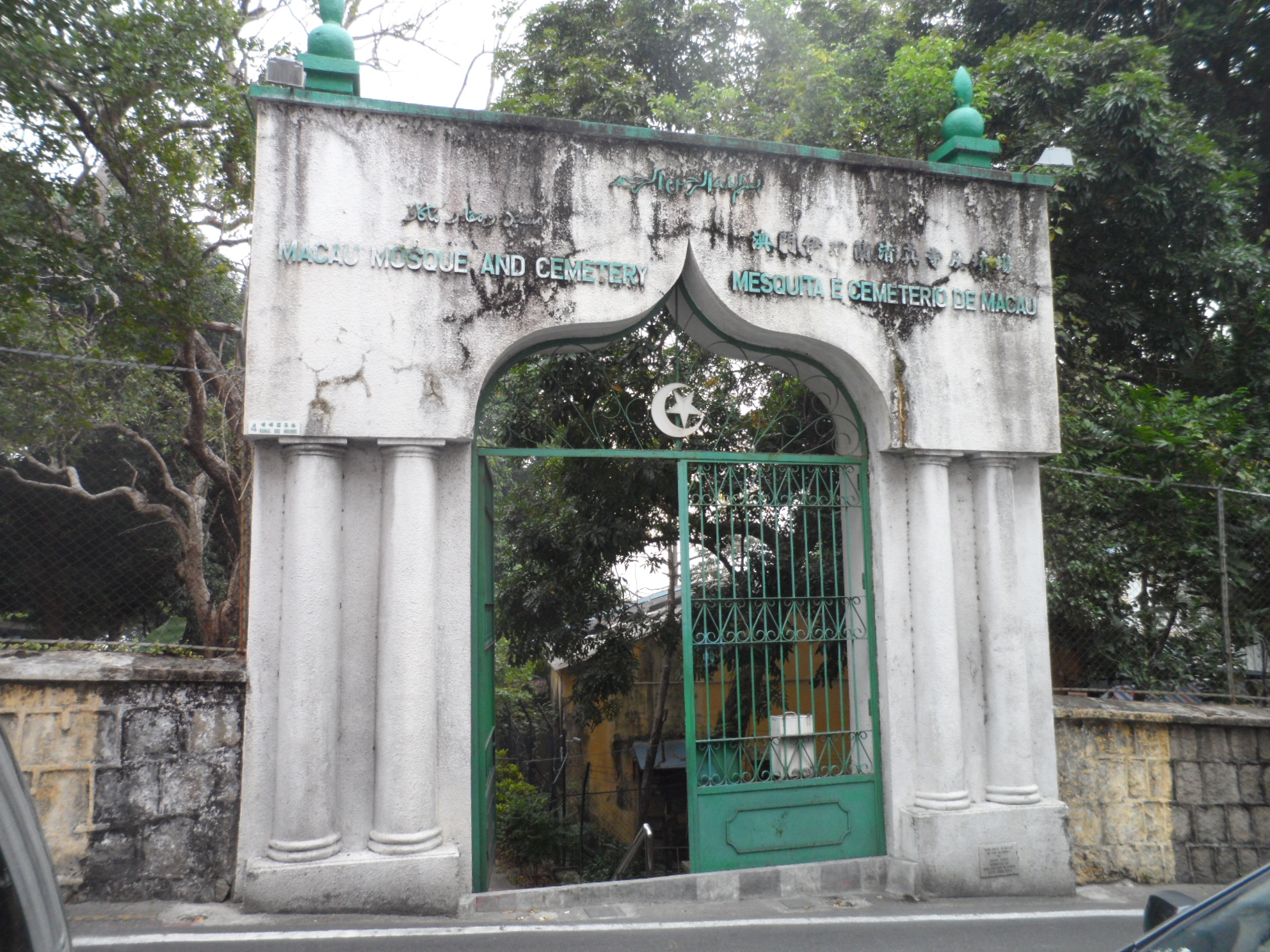
- The entrance gate, or iwan

- Location of the mosque in Macau

Religion
- Affiliation: Sunni Islam
- Ecclesiastical or organisational status: Mosque; cemetery
- Status: Active

Location
- Location: 4 Ramal Dos Moros, Nossa Senhora de Fátima, Macau
- Country: China
- Interactive map of Macau Mosque and Cemetery
- Coordinates: 22°12′10″N 113°33′16″E

Architecture
- Type: Mosque
- Completed: 1980s

Specifications
- Capacity: 100 worshipers
- Length: 6.5 m (21 ft)
- Width: 12 m (39 ft)

Macau Mosque and Cemetery

Chinese name
- Traditional Chinese: 澳門伊斯蘭清真寺及墳場
- Simplified Chinese: 澳门伊斯兰清真寺及坟场
Transcriptions
Standard Mandarin
- Hanyu Pinyin: Àomén Yīsīlán Qīngzhēnsì jí Fénchǎng
Yue: Cantonese
- Jyutping: ou3 mun4*2 ji1 si1 laan4 cing1 zan1 zi6*2 kap6 fan4 coeng4

Portuguese name
- Portuguese: Mesquita e Cemitério de Macau

The Macau Mosque and Cemetery (Chinese: 澳門伊斯蘭清真寺及墳場; Portuguese: Mesquita e Cemitério de Macau) is the only mosque and Muslim cemetery in Macau, China, located in the parish of Nossa Senhora de Fátima.

== History ==
It is believed that Macau Mosque was built by Muslims who arrived with the Portuguese army. Originally, these Muslims were recruited from South Asia by the army. Within the complex area, there are also Muslim cemetery with some of the tombs dated back for hundreds of years, indicating that Islam had arrived in Macau since hundreds of years ago.

In 1996, the IAM submitted a redevelopment plan of the mosque to Portuguese Macau government but was not approved. To accommodate the increasing number of Muslims in Macau, in 2006 the IAM applied for government permission to build a new larger mosque in area adjacent to the current mosque building. In the late months of 2007, Macau Mosque underwent renovation.

During the COVID-19 pandemic, the Government of Macau ordered the mosque to be closed for one month.

== Architecture ==
The Macau Mosque and Cemetery area consists of the mosque, a sahn, the cemetery, headquarters of the Islamic Association of Macau, wadu, badminton court and playground. The mosque is approximately 6.5 by 12 metres (21 by 39 ft), and can accommodate around 100 worshipers. The Macau Mosque and Cemetery entrance gate was donated by Halima binti Sheik on 27 June 1973 in the memory of Adam Sheik.

== Activities ==
The Macau Mosque houses the headquarters of the Islamic Association of Macau (IAM; Chinese: 澳門伊斯蘭會; Portuguese: Associação Islâmica de Macau), which manages the daily operation of the mosque. The association was founded in 1935 in Portuguese Macau. The association is financially assisted by the Islamic Union of Hong Kong in Hong Kong.

More people visit the mosque on Sunday during their off days due to their tight working schedule in the weekdays or for wedding and during big Islamic festivities, such as Eid al-Adha. Most of them do the Quran reading or Islamic studies activities. During Eid al-Adha, the Muslims sacrifice cows and slaughter them at the Macau Slaughter House.

== Future ==
In the future, the new mosque is planned to be double in size to be a more modern mosque for Macau with a total area of 1,881 square metres (20,250 sq ft), 50 metres (160 ft) high and can accommodate up to 600 worshipers. An Islamic center, cheap Halal restaurant, 30-room hostel and classroom and 127-metre-high (417 ft) 38-story residential building will also be constructed.

The Macau Mosque and Cemetery transportation links will be served from Zona do Nordeste Station of the Macau LRT. However, the LRT Macau Line project has been put on hold.

== Gallery ==
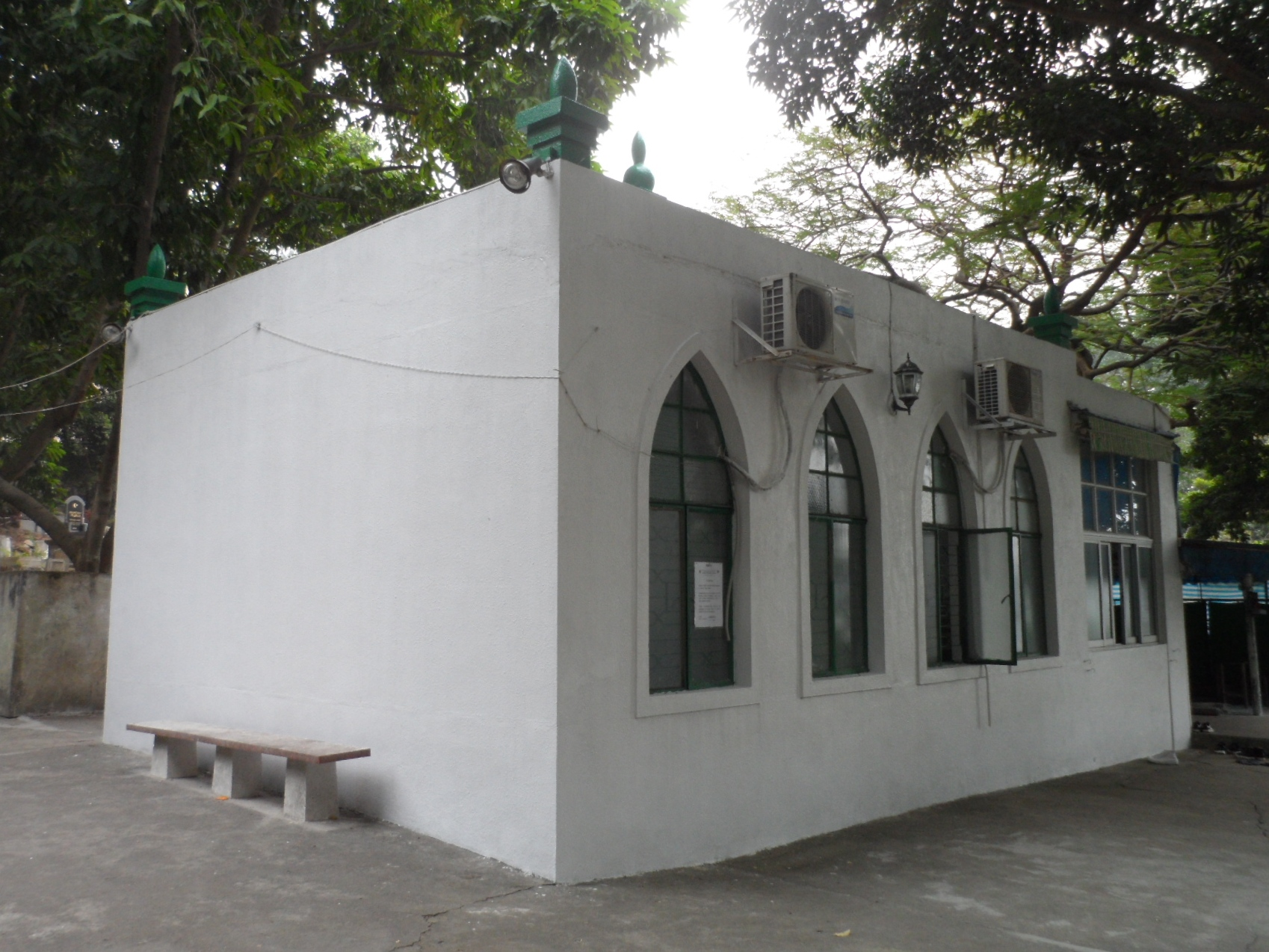
Macau Mosque

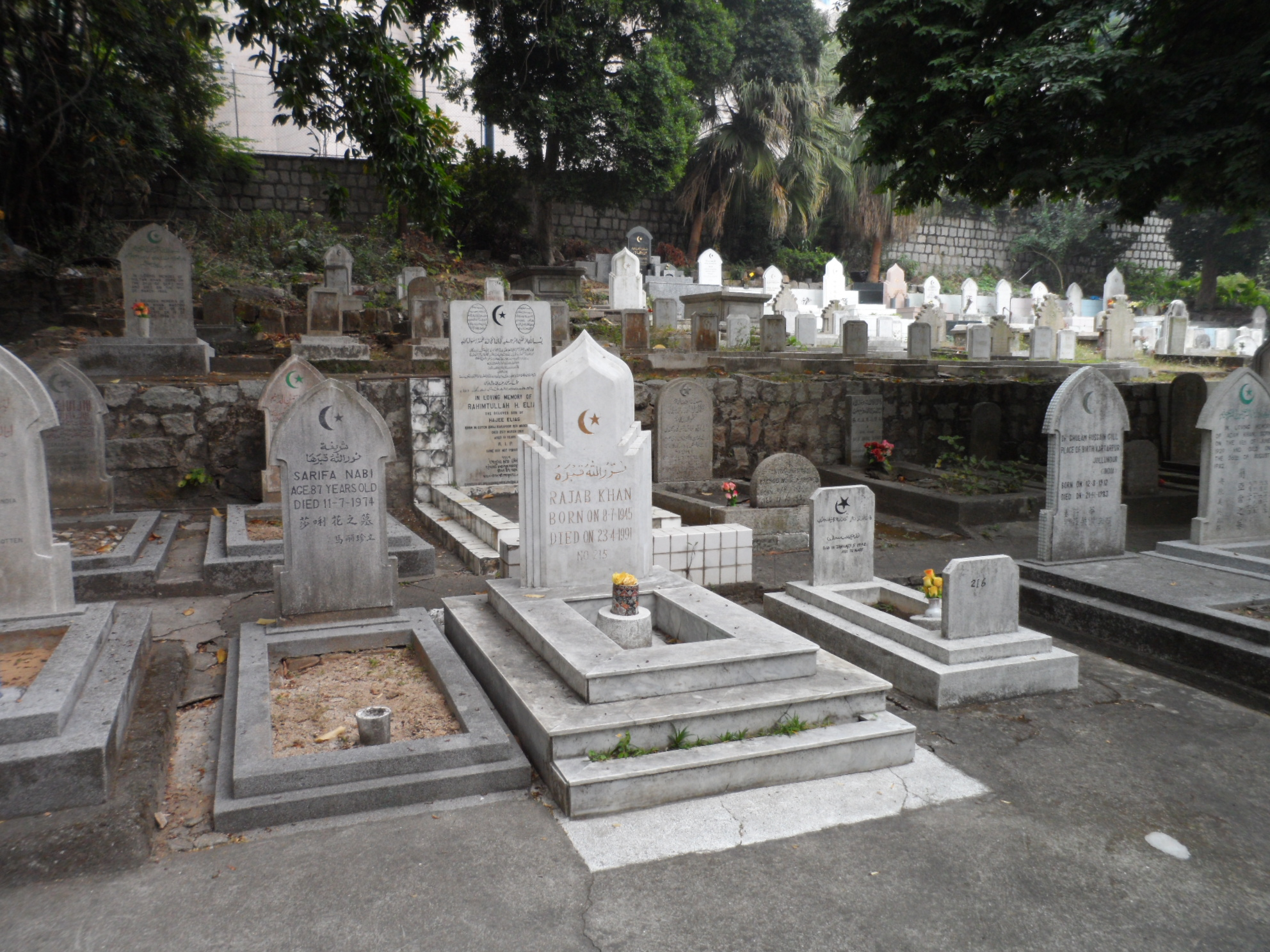
Macau Muslim Cemetery

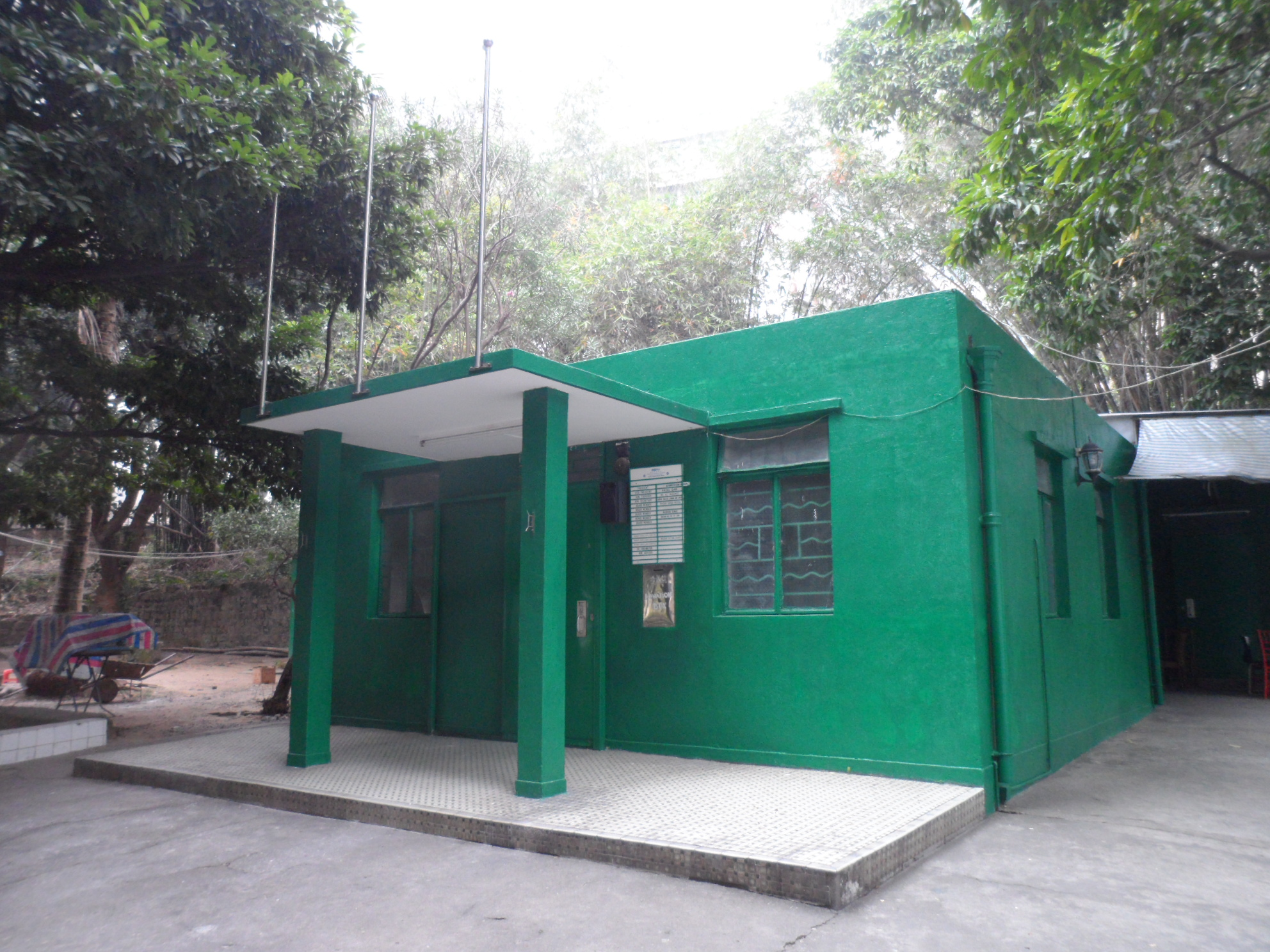
Islamic Association of Macau headquarters

== See also ==
- Islam in Macau
- Islam in China
- List of mosques in China
