= Ji Dou Church =

The Ji Dou Church (Chinese: 志(Zhì)道(Dào)堂(Táng)), also known locally as Chi Tao Tong, is the oldest Chinese Protestant church in Macau. The church is now situated at 5 Rua De Henrique De Macedo (馬大臣街 Minister Macedo Street) (Map) in Bird Garden District (雀仔園), Macau. The congregation usually has an attendance of between 60 and 70 members - in Macau standards this is considered to be a medium-sized church. According to the Macau Christian Association data, Macau only has 4,000 registered members of the Christian faith - however there are over 70 churches so each local congregation would be averaging between 40 and 50 members.

== The early church ==
"Chi Tao Tong" (originally known as "Chi Tao Hall") was founded in Macau during 1906. Before its establishment, Macau had garnered many religious believers and faithful followers, but no brick-and-mortar meeting places. Before the creation of the Ji Dou Church, Christians met as small congregations in the homes of their members. Early congregations began around 1898 with the arrival of London Missionary Society pastor Pei Yao. Priests of these early Christian communities included Wang Yu, Fung Fu, and Heqin Po District elders.

=== Community expansion ===
Over the years, land and funds were donated to the growing congregation, climaxing in 1906 with the construction of a cottage-style structure to house the activities of the church. Accommodating approximately 300 seats, Chi Tao Hall commenced operation around 1906.

However, when black suburbs is part of the evening quiet of Chi Tao Tong greatly hinder the work himself. Fellow member-deliberation, and then sets in, the Minister Ma Street, the acquisition of housing to build new churches. Completion of the new hall in 1918. Church growth because local inadequate, then in 1932 and 1964 successively converted into four future Hall School shared building. (Google Translation—Work In Progress)

=== Educational outreach ===
In moving into Central, the Chi Tao Church is committed to run education. Founded in 1919 "Chi Tao kindergarten," the Macao education campaign. Then run "Cai high School," in 1949 to develop high school. And the establishment of "China's education services", the woman of love learning, free woman evening, and Chi Tao homes. Society, since 1905 to recruit followers Li Shu Road Dhi Hall for being your teacher, of the increase. 1909, the opening gathering in the city center locations, called "really Road Institute", and the establishment of the furnace Wu sermon, and in sub-Tong Chen Yue. In the 1930s to the early 1960s, as the enthusiastic sermon, schools have to be on track, as well as in Hong Kong after the fall of Hong Kong to Macau believers, the Church has surfaced. 1926 Chi Tao Tong joined the CCC "Guangdong Association," 1948 will be joining the 10th District, 1966 to the "Hong Kong will," that is, until now. (Google Translation—Work In Progress)

== Postwar decline ==
After victory in the Sino-Japanese War in 1945, large numbers of refugees emigrated, contributing to an intellectual decline and lack of available resources.

Even in 1967, set up years Cai high schools will also change in the Anglican processing. This is because when Macao 133 incidents, many Christian schools are forced to become leftists secondary schools Chi Road Christian Church in order to maintain education will be delivered Anglican school for processing. This is because the Anglican British embassy protection, no one can force him to the school to leftist schools. After 10 years, missionaries flows continuously understaffed, let alone carry out such work. By the 1980s, beginning with his return to the home court to livestock, was determined to resume running schools. 1988 opened "Morrison Building Memorial School," the first-kindergarten, kindergarten has become attached to the six-year primary school. (Google Translation—Work In Progress)

== The church today ==
Over the years, further difficulties arose surrounding a decline in attendance of the schools and services supported by the Ji Dou Church. Other nearby institutions began transferring the Ji Dou students to their ranks, and in the first years of the twenty-first century church finally ceased its educational endeavors, with its last class of sixth grade students at Morrison Building School graduating in 2004. By the time the church shut down its school, students had begun to move to other areas, and the congregation had begun to wane.

Today, Chi Tao Tong is a fellowship aimed at a younger audience, primarily comprising primary, secondary, and collegiate students, offering outreach to these groups, in addition to supporting femo-centric services.

== See also ==
- Religion in Macau
