= Religion in Macau =

Religion in Macau (Pew Research Center 2020)
1. Unaffiliated (67.6%)
2. Buddhism (19.6%)
3. Christianity (10.1%)
4. Other religions (2.70%)

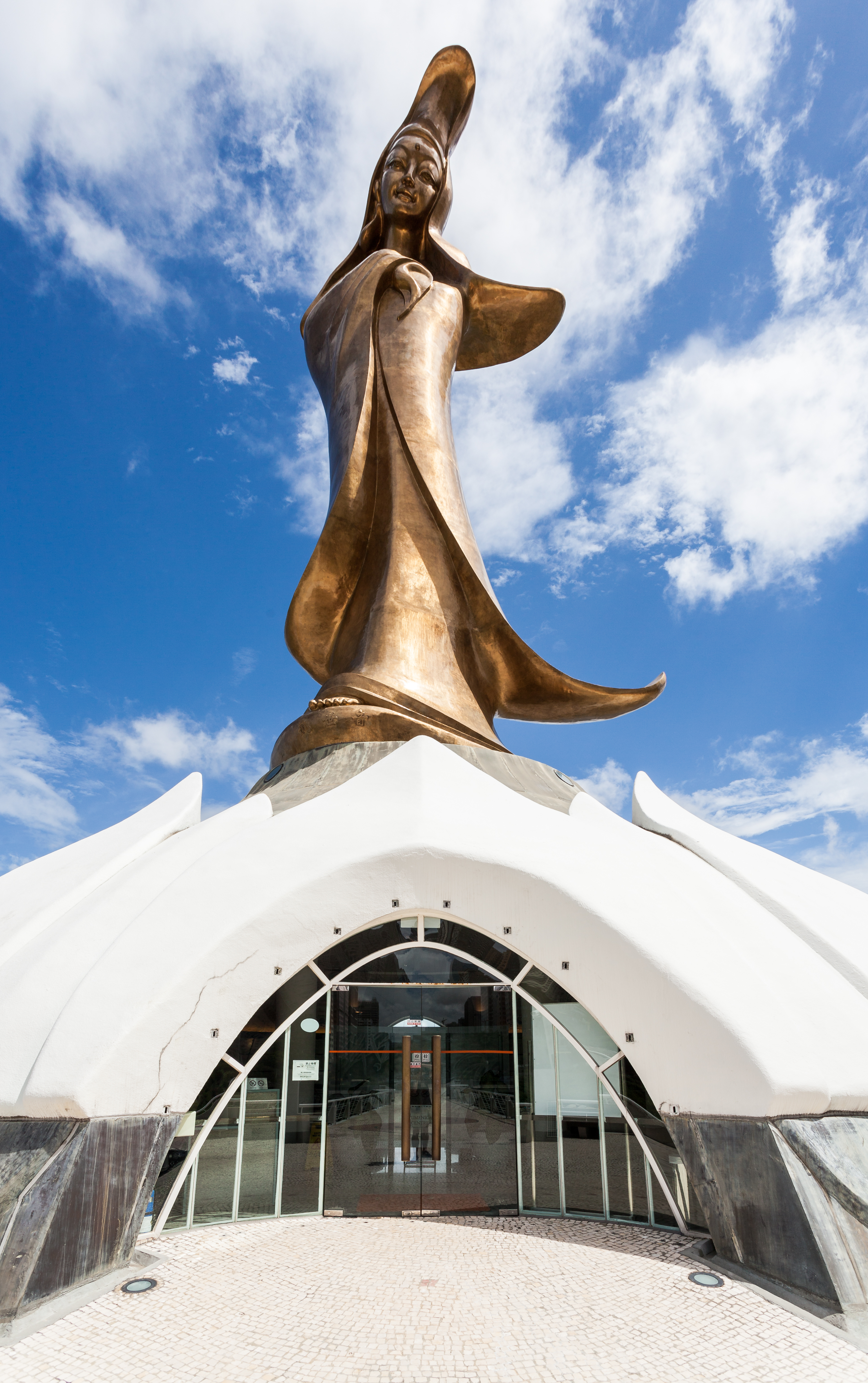
Statue of Guan Yin, the goddess of mercy, in Macau.

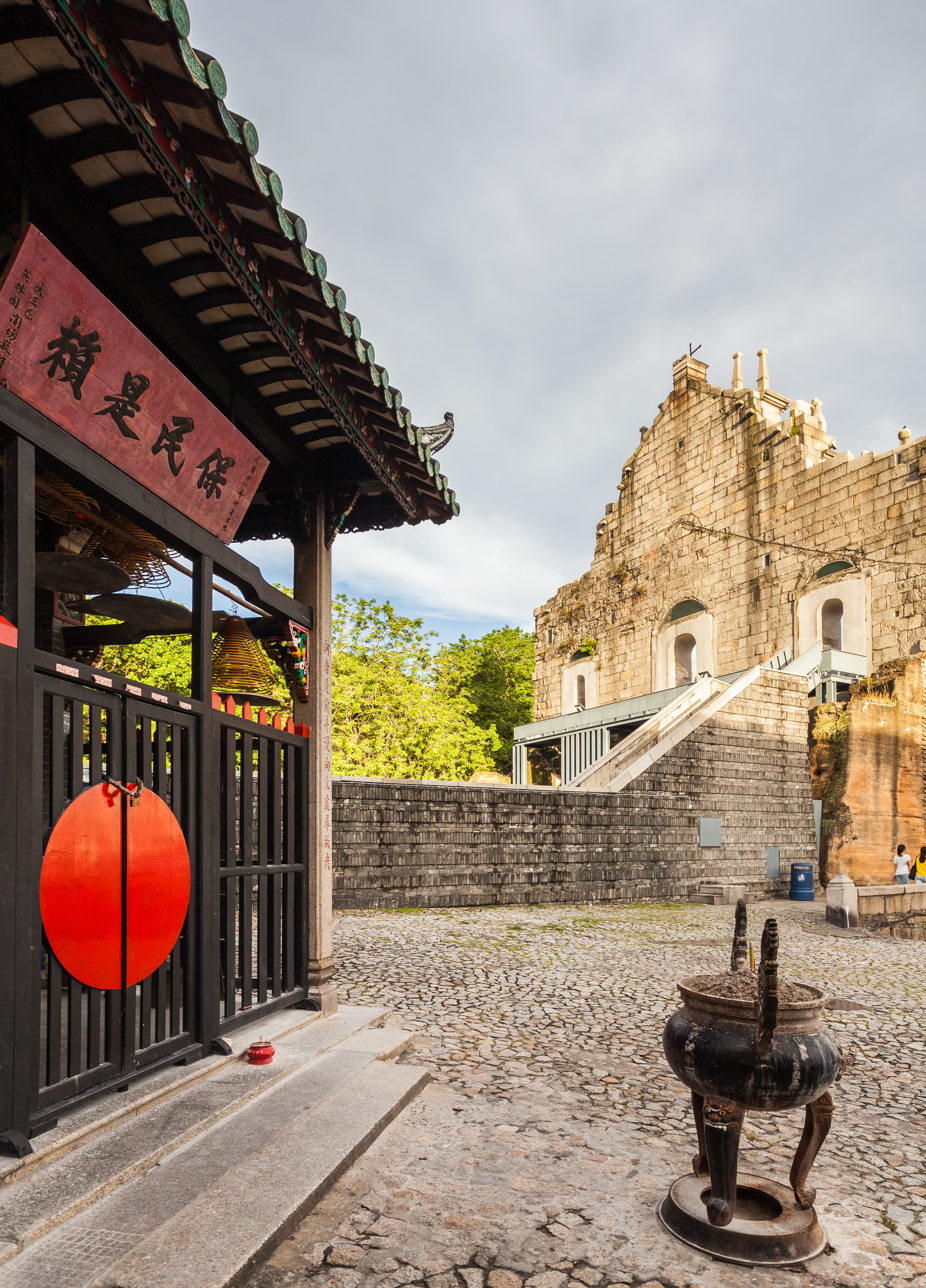
The Na Tcha Temple of the Centre of Macau, behind the Ruins of St. Paul's. It is dedicated to the deity Nezha.

Religion in Macau is represented predominantly by Buddhism and Chinese folk religions. During the period in which the city was under Portuguese rule (1557–1999) the Catholic Church became one of the dominant faiths, but nowadays it has greatly declined.

Macau Basic Law guarantees freedom of religion and the residents of Macau have the right to practice a religion of their choice. Based on Article 3:34, "the people in Macau are free to participate in religious activities and to preach as they wish". In Article 3:120, "the Macau Special Administrative Region embraces the principle of freedom of religion and belief; the government will not interfere in the internal workings of a religious body or organization and the believers are free to maintain ties and to develop relationships with overseas religious organizations outside Macau".

Religious organizations can found in religious colleges or other schools, hospitals and welfare organizations in accordance with the law. Schools operated by religious institutions can teach their religion. Religious organizations have the right to use, handle, inherit and obtain financial contributions in accordance with the law. Their right to wealth is protected by the law.

== Chinese folk religion ==
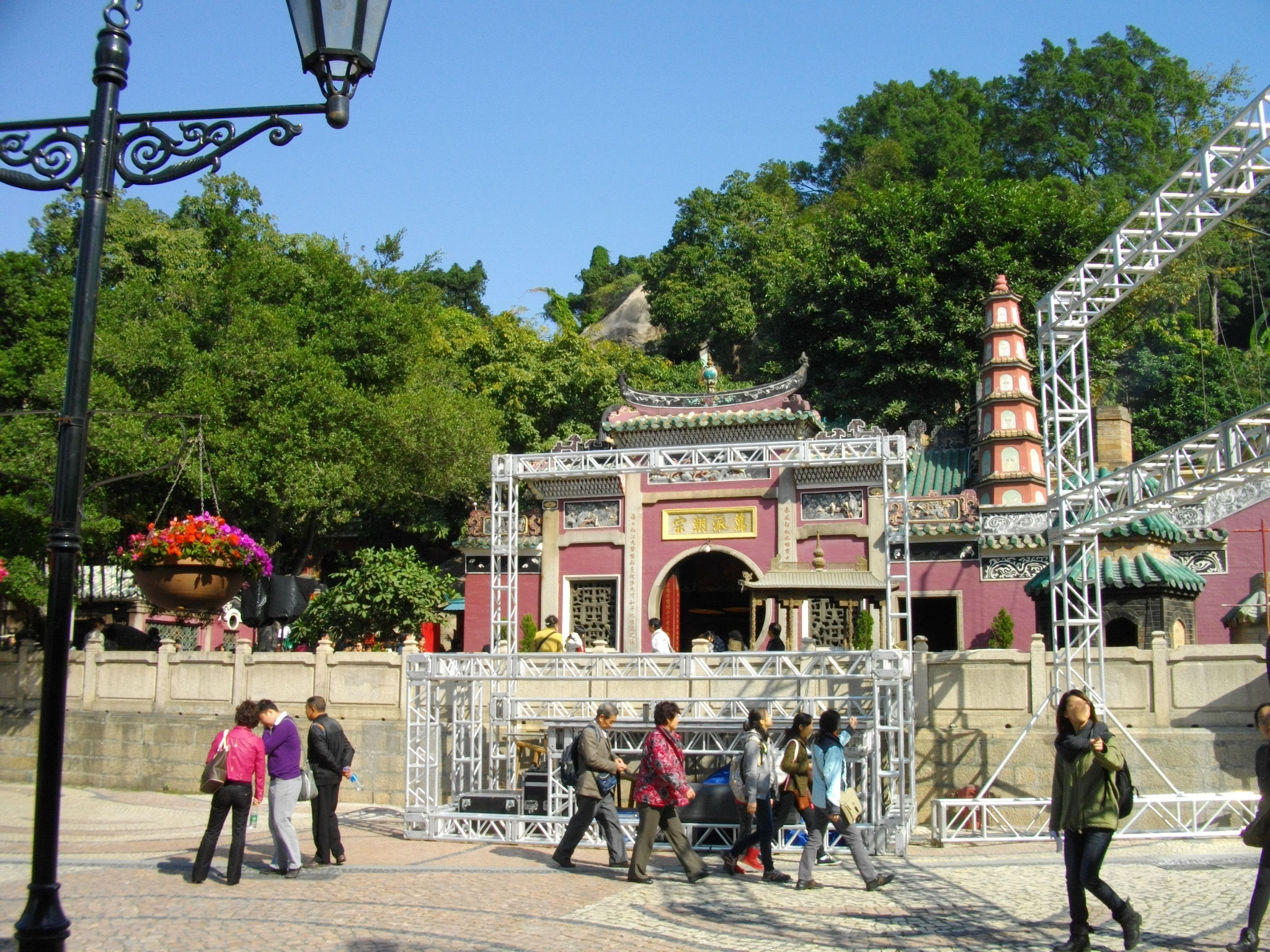
The A-Ma Temple.

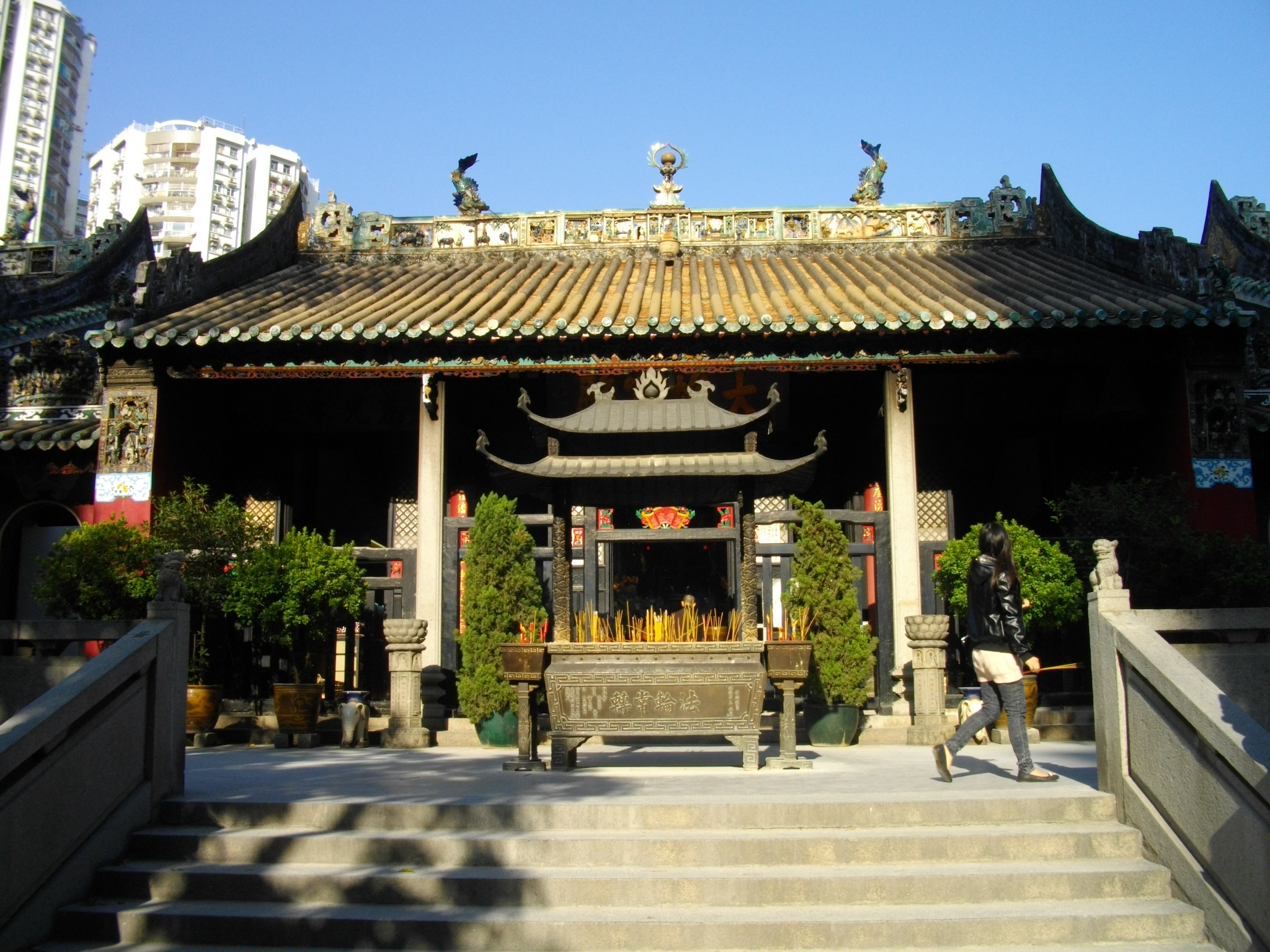
Kun Iam Temple.

The Chinese folk religion is the indigenous religion of the Han Chinese. Its focus is the worship of the Shen (神 "expressions", "Gods"), that are the generative powers of nature, also including, in the human sphere, ancestors and progenitors of families or lineages, and divine heroes that made a significant imprinting in the history of the Chinese civilisation.

In Macau, one of the most popular deities is Mazu. The name "Macau" itself derives from a Portuguese version of the local name of a prominent Mazu temple (A-Ma Temple), Maa Gok 媽閣 (Jyutping: Maa1 Gok3, pinyin: Māgé).

=== Confucianism ===
The culture of Macau is influenced by Confucian values and morality. In 1909, the Macau Confucian Association was created. The organization was at first an offshoot of the Beijing Confucian Association, but later gained independence. The purpose of the Macau Confucian Association is to "respect the principles of Confucianism, to spread the holy virtue, provide education for those with aptitude and promote the culture". To this end, in 1913 the organization started a small school in Macau. In 1960, the organization printed a selection of the sayings of Confucius for use in secondary schools. It has collected about 74 sayings from the Analects of Confucius, Mencius (Book) and other Confucian classics, in order to help students to memorize and recite them.

On the birthday of Confucius, which is celebrated on 27 August of the lunar calendar, the organization holds a ceremony of commemoration and sacrifice at which school students are invited to take part.

=== Taoism ===
Taoism was first introduced to Macau in the third century. Elements of it have since largely been practiced alongside Buddhism.

== Minor religions ==
=== Christianity ===
==== Catholicism ====
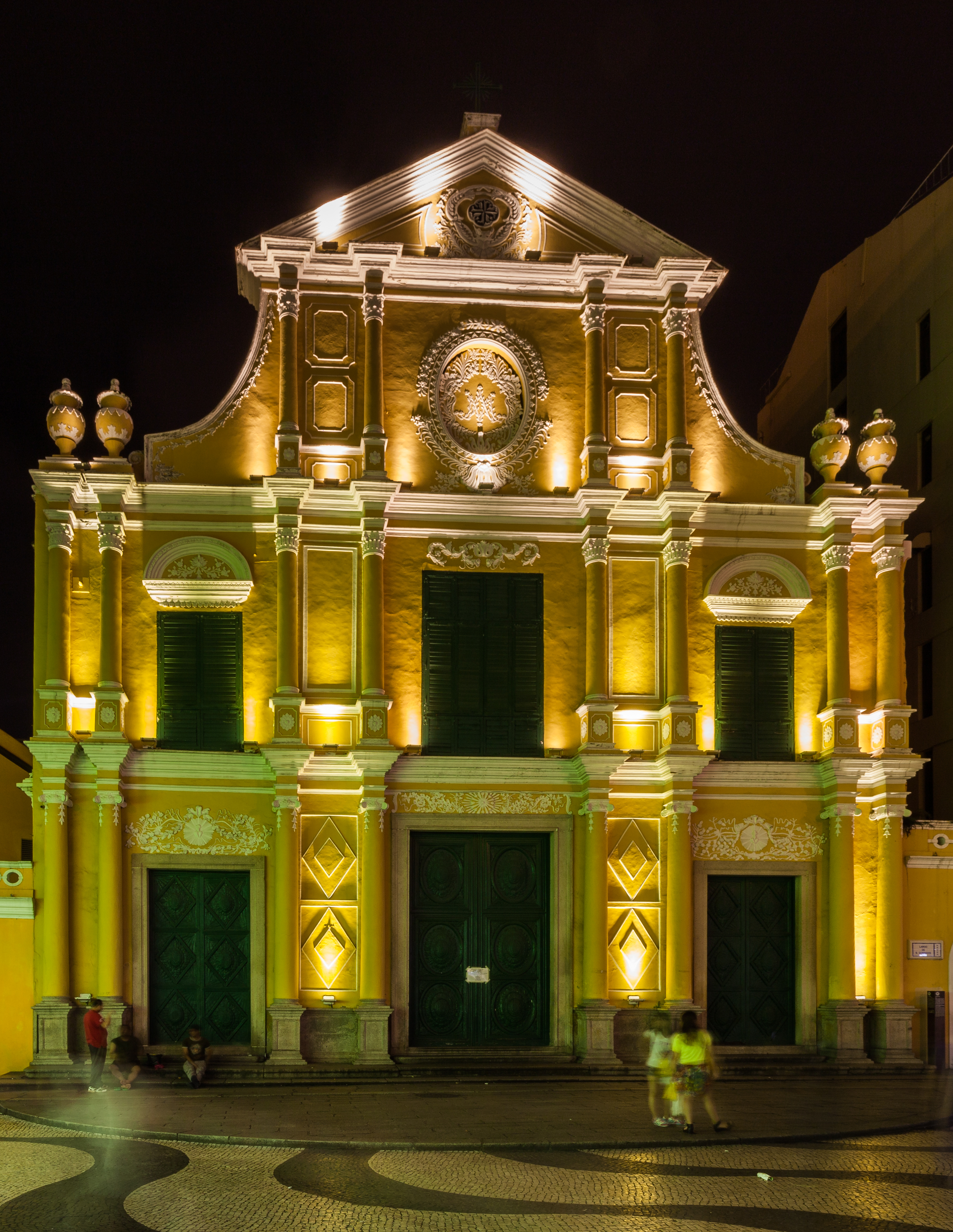
St. Dominic's Church.

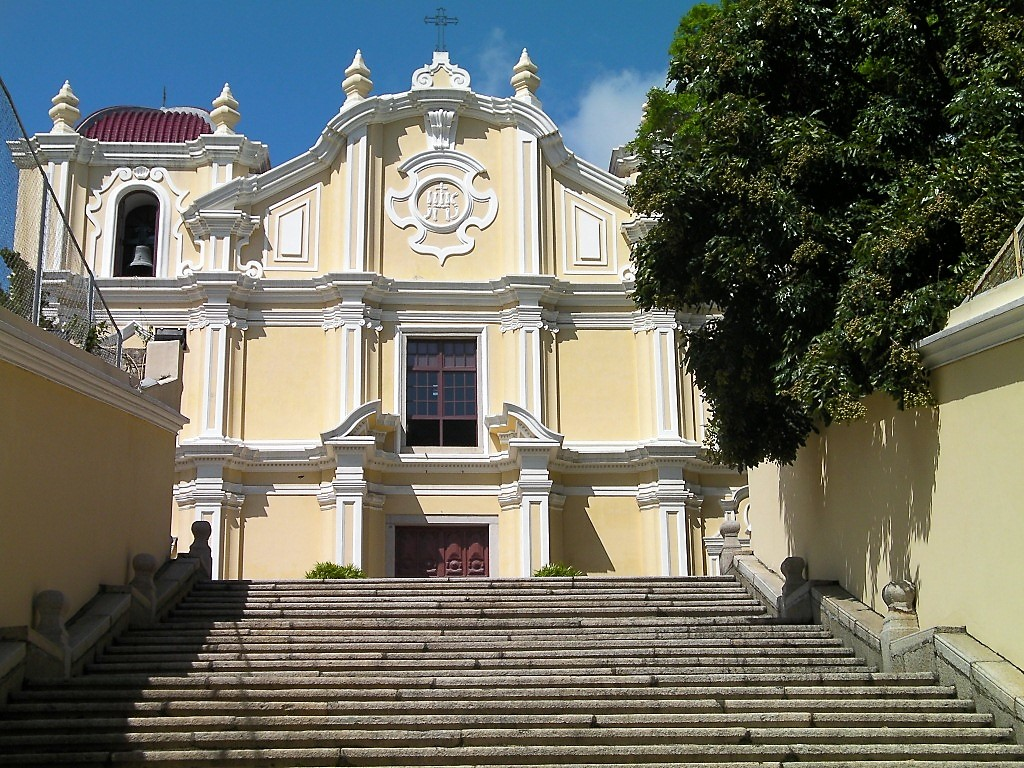
St. Joseph's Church

Catholicism is a lasting legacy of the Portuguese colonial control of Macau.

The Catholic Church in Macau is organized through the Diocese of Macau of the Latin Church. This diocese was established on 23 January 1576 by Pope Gregory XIII, and is currently limited in extent to the territory of the Special Administrative Region (MSAR) of the People's Republic of China. Since 2016, Bishop Stephen Lee Bun-sang has been at the head of this diocese.

Macau became a diocese of the Catholic Church in the sixteenth century, after the arrival of the Portuguese. At its foundation, the Diocese of Macau was given a wide jurisdiction over various ecclesiastical territories in the Far East, such as China, Japan, Vietnam and Malaysia (but not the Philippines). It became a major training and departure point for Catholic missionaries to different countries in Asia. To further strengthen this role, a college was founded in São Paulo in the sixteenth century, the first Western college in Asia for the training of missionaries. In the eighteenth century, the Seminary of St. Joseph was also established to train missionaries and priests.

According to the Pontifical Yearbook 2004, there were about 18,000 practicing Catholics in Macau in that year (representing about 4% of the total population), 24 secular priests, 52 religious priests (members of religious orders), 62 brothers and 183 sisters in the territory.

According to government statistics, Catholics in Macau, in 2005, numbered about 27,000 (about 5.6% of the total population) and most of them were members of the Chinese community, with some Portuguese, people of the Eurasian community with Portuguese descent and thousands of other foreigners, including many Filipinos. There has been a progressive decline in the use of the Portuguese language in the liturgy and increasingly, Mass and other sacraments are celebrated in other languages. For example, as of 2019, Mass is celebrated 30 times every Sunday in Macau: 16 times in Cantonese, 7 times in English, 4 times in Portuguese, 2 times in Mandarin and 1 time in Vietnamese. Recent government surveys have indicated that Catholicism is declining among Macau's population.

Although the Catholic Church is not the predominant religion in Macau, it continues to influence and engage in areas such as social work and education. The Diocese of Macau has six parishes and 24 social institutions, made up of eight daycare centres, six nursing homes for the elderly, five rehabilitation centres for the mentally and physically disabled and five children's homes. In the field of education, in the 2004/2005 school year, the Catholic Church taught in 31 schools, to over 36,000 students and over the years, a large number of influential non-Christians have received a Christian education. In addition, there is a Portuguese Catholic university, an educational institution of higher education known as the Inter-University Institute of Macau.

Among the important annual events are Procession of the Bom Jesus dos Passos in Macau, the Good Friday procession and the Feast of Our Lady of Fatima procession.

==== Protestantism ====
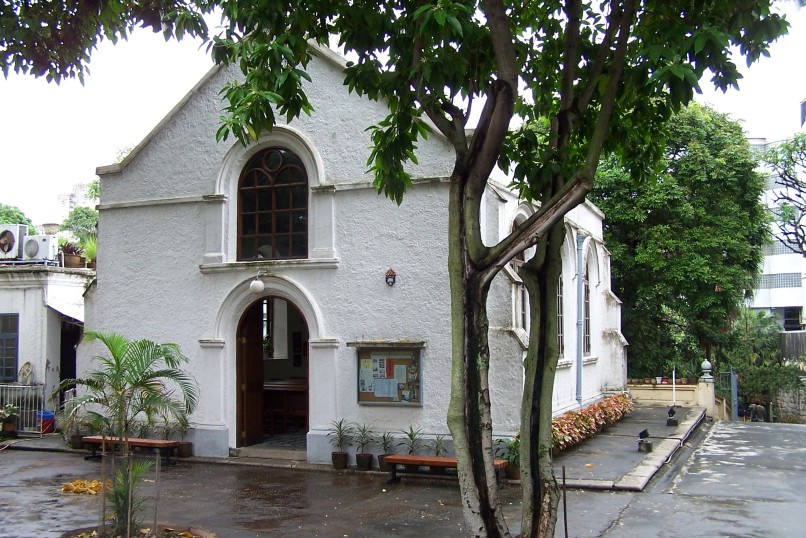
Macau Protestant Chapel, an Anglican parish church.

In 1807, Robert Morrison, the first Protestant missionary to China, landed at Macau. Morrison's main objective was to reach the Chinese living in Guangzhou and he started his missionary work there straight away. It was only later that he founded a Chinese Protestant church in Macau itself. Following the Opium War of 1842, the Qing dynasty gave Hong Kong to the United Kingdom and most Protestant missionaries and British subjects who lived in Macau moved to Hong Kong. As most of the British were Protestants, the Macau Protestant population was reduced to only a handful for a long time. By the 20th century, some Chinese Protestants were meeting in people's homes. The most famous Chinese Christians to open their homes for meetings were Lui De Shan and Yu Mei De. With the support of churches in Hong Kong, Ji Dou Church was founded. This was the first Chinese Protestant church in Macau (its original name was Ji Dou Hall). It was registered with the Portuguese colonial government in 1905 and the church building was constructed at Hei Sha Huan. The Macau Baptist Church, the second Chinese Protestant church in Macau, was built soon after and following this, a number of Chinese Protestant churches were founded.

When the Victoria Diocese of the Anglican Communion was established in 1849, it included Macau as well as Hong Kong. When the Province of Chung Hua Sheng Kung Hui was established in 1912, Macau was included with Hong Kong and Guangdong. In 1951, following the communist take over in mainland China, Hong Kong and Macau left the Diocese and established the Sheng Kung Hui Diocese of Hong Kong and Macau. Following the end of the British administration of Hong Kong in 1997, in 1998 the Diocese was succeeded by the Province of Hong Kong Sheng Kung Hui (commonly called the Hong Kong Anglican Church).

Today there are about 4,000 practicing Protestants in Macau with an average of just 50 people participating and worshipping in services at each church. Many churches in Macau were founded by different communities from Hong Kong and other countries, representing the Anglican Church, the Baptist Church and the Lutheran Church, but historically there was little cooperation between them. When the Union of Christian Evangelical Churches in Macau was founded in 1990, a new era of cooperation began. In 2006, the 7th Chinese Congress on World Evangelization was held in Macau, further inspiring the Protestant churches in Macau to unite.

Due to pressure in the past from the Portuguese colonial government and the Roman Catholic Church, Protestant churches were allowed to do only limited social, pastoral and educational work. They were also limited by poor funding and many Protestant schools were closed after the 12-3 incident, which reduced even further the role of the Protestant churches in education in Macau. There are only seven remaining Protestant primary and secondary schools in Macau. There are, however, some rehabilitation programmes run by Protestant organisations that receive government support. A Protestant counselling service was started by the Macau Chinese Christian Mission in 2005. Missionaries are free to conduct missionary activities and are active in Macau.

==== Jehovah's Witnesses ====
The first Jehovah's Witnesses activities in the territory where in the 1960s when foreign witnesses from Portugal and Hong Kong arrived to the island.

Because the work of Jehovah’s Witnesses was banned in Portugal at that time, the Macao police arrested and deported some of the foreign Jehovah's Witnesses during the '60s.

In 2020, the number of Jehovah's Witnesses was 394 active publishers, united in 5 congregations; 845 people attended annual celebration of Lord's Evening Meal in 2020. Jehovah's Witnesses meetings in Macau are held in Mandarin Chinese, English and Vietnamese.

=== Islam ===
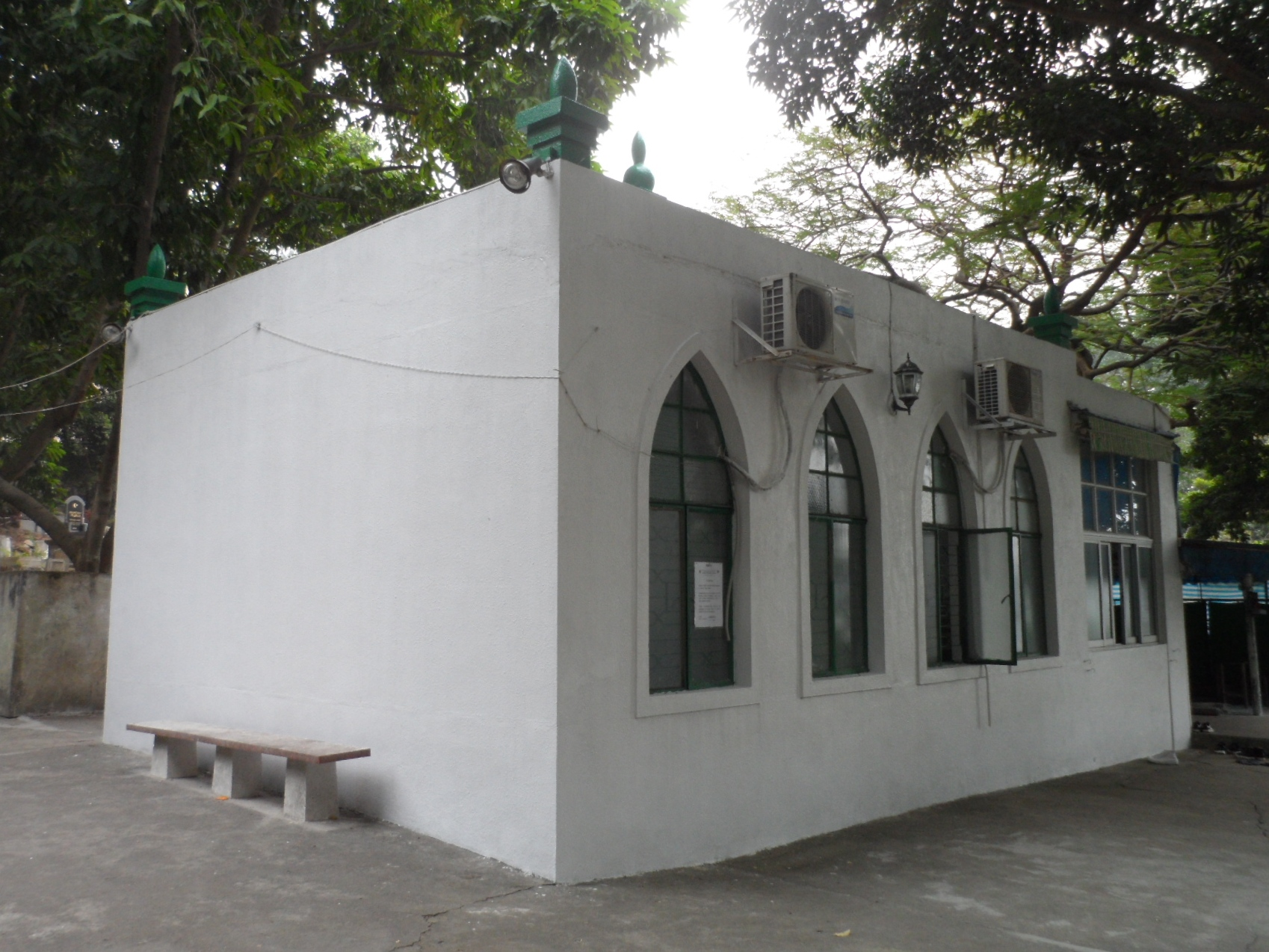
Macau Mosque

Islam has been present in Macau since before the Ming dynasty. Although the exact period and manner of its introduction is disputed, it is traditionally held that it was brought to the area by Arab and Persian traders. During World War II, a large number of ethnic Hui Muslims fled to Macau to escape the devastation in the rest of the country.

In 2007, Macau had one mosque and Muslim cemetery, the Macau Mosque and Cemetery, to serve the city's more than four hundred Muslims that associate under the name of "The Macau Islamic Society". This mosque was under renovation in the late months of 2007 and planned to double in size in order to provide a more modern mosque in the heart of Macau. Both Muslims and Roman Catholics sometimes choose to name one of their children Fatima, Omar or Soraya.

=== Baháʼí ===
Macau was one of the areas chosen for the Baháʼí Faith expansion plan known as the Ten Year Crusade. In 1953, Frances Heller, of California, USA, became the first Baháʼí in Macau. In 1954, Yan Peifeng became the first Macau resident to convert to the Baháʼí religion. In March 1964, Macau's Baháʼí population consisted of 30 people. On April 21, 1959, the first Local Spiritual Assembly was elected and by 1962 the religion had spread to the islands of Taipa and Coloane. In 1989, Macau formed its first National Spiritual Assembly. At the moment there are four Local Spiritual Assemblies with four hundred members in total, and are collectively known as the Macau Baháʼí Community.

=== Falun Gong ===
Falun Gong practitioners exist in public.

== See also ==
- Kau chim & Jiaobei
- Heterodox teachings (Chinese law)
- Religion in China
- Religion in Hong Kong
- Religion in Taiwan
- Religion in Tibet
