= University of Saint Joseph =

Catholic university in Macau, China

- 聖若瑟大學; Universidade de São José
- Motto: Tradition, Innovation and Vision
- Type: Private
- Established: 1996; 30 years ago
- Affiliations: GHMUA
- Rector: Stephen Morgan
- Students: 1,800
- Location: Main: Estrada Marginal da Ilha Verde, 14-17, Macau; NAPE1: Rua de Londres 16, Sé, Macau; Saint Joseph Seminary: 5 Largo de Sto. Agostinho, Macau; 22.2113°N 113.5390°E
- Colours
- Website: usj.edu.mo

University of Saint Joseph

Chinese name
- Traditional Chinese: 聖若瑟大學
- Simplified Chinese: 圣若瑟大学
Transcriptions
Standard Mandarin
- Hanyu Pinyin: Shèng Ruòsè Dàxué
Yue: Cantonese
- Jyutping: sing3 joek6 sat1 daai6 hok6

Macau Inter-University Institute
- Traditional Chinese: 澳門高等校際學院
- Simplified Chinese: 澳门高等校际学院
Transcriptions
Standard Mandarin
- Hanyu Pinyin: Àomén Gāoděng Xiàojì Xuéyuàn
Yue: Cantonese
- Jyutping: ou3 mun4*2 gou1 dang2 hok6 zai3 hok6 jyun6*2

Portuguese name
- Portuguese: Universidade de São José (old name: Instituto Inter-Universitário de Macau)

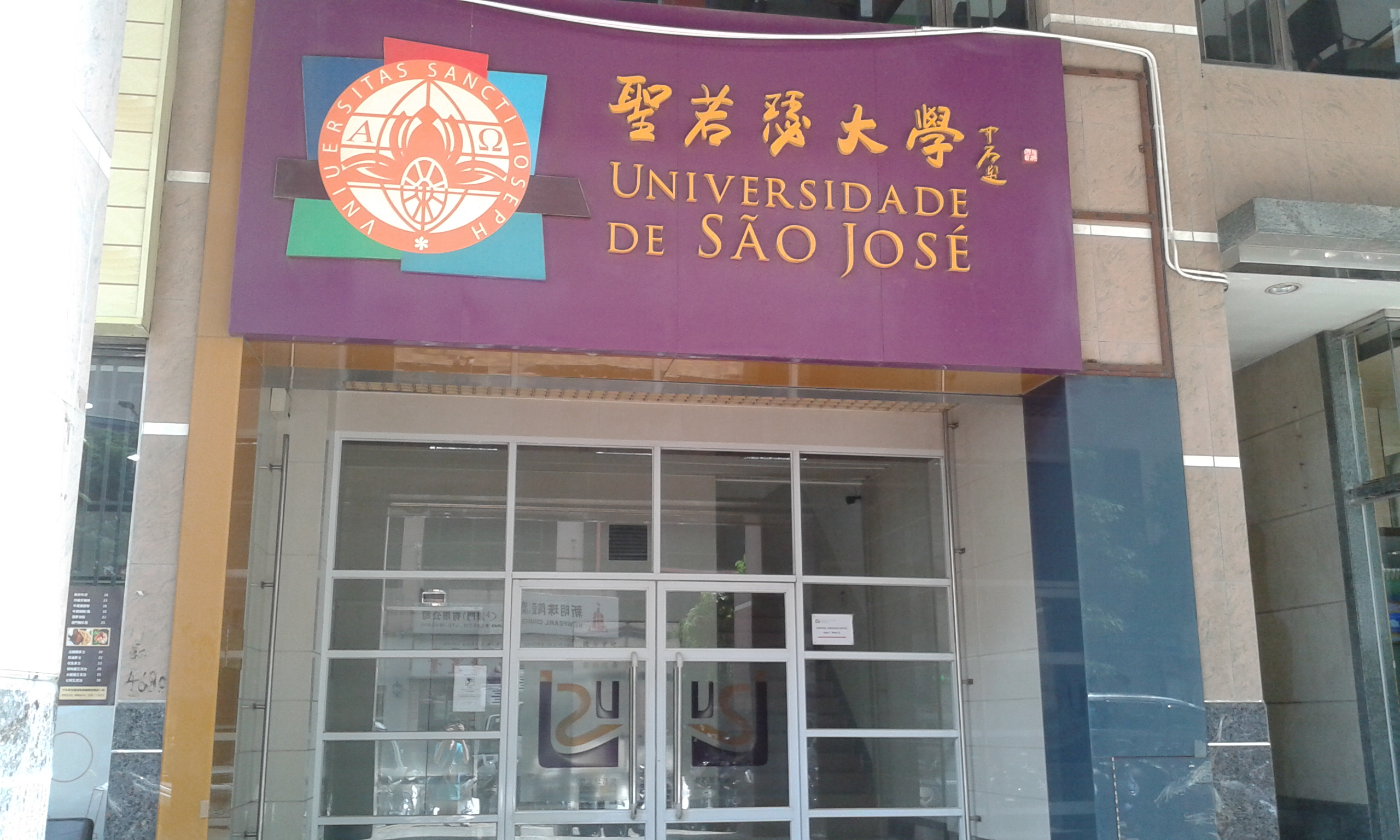
University of Saint Joseph's NAPE1 campus

The University of Saint Joseph (USJ) is a private Catholic university in Macau, China.

The university was founded in 1996, previously known as Macau Inter-University Institute (Chinese: 澳門高等校際學院; Portuguese: Instituto Inter-Universitário de Macau; IIUM). It was jointly organized by the Catholic University of Portugal and the Diocese of Macau. It is also connected by structural, academic, and social bonds to the special administrative region of Macau, to Portugal, and to mainland China.

USJ expresses its mission as being a private Catholic university in, of, and for Macao, in, of, and for China, concentrating on post-graduate teaching and research, together with professional training in the liberal arts and social sciences.

USJ offers a wide range of courses ranging from the humanities to the social and technological sciences. New courses are regularly being added in order to keep pace with the most recent academic and scientific advances in the modern world.

There are programs for certificates, diplomas, licentiate (undergraduate/bachelor's), master's, and doctoral degrees, and also language programs including the teaching of Putonghua (Mandarin), Portuguese, Japanese, French, and English.

== History ==
Catholic higher education in Asia began with the founding, in 1594, of the Colégio de Macau by Fr Alessandro Valignano SJ. Frs Michele Ruggieri, Matteo Ricci and Johann Adam Schall von Bell SJs studied in Macao, as did St Andrew Kim, the first Korean Martyr. Part of its teaching was transferred to the Seminário de São Jose in 1728 where the teaching of theology, philosophy and religious studies continues to this day (after a 28 year break between 1968 & 1996) as part on USJ's Faculty of Religious Studies and Philosophy.

The University of Saint Joseph was founded in 1996.

In September 2017, the university moved its main campus building to Ilha Verde but retaining the NAPE campus (hosting the Institute of Science and Environment), and the Seminary campus (hosting the Faculty of Religious Studies and Philosophy).

The university's fourth rector, the Rev'd Prof Stephen Morgan DPhil(Oxon) was elected on 9 March 2020 and installed on 23 May 2020. He is a theologian and ecclesiastical historian who had previously been the university's Dean of the Faculty of Religious Studies.

In September 2021, the University announced that it had been given permission to recruit students from Mainland China for the first time.

== Campuses ==
The university has three campuses: The main campus in Ilha Verde, Nossa Senhora de Fátima (Our Lady of Fátima Parish); its original campus (NAPE) in Sé (Cathedral Parish); and the Saint Joseph Seminary in São Lourenço (Saint Lawrence).

== University Organisation ==
The university is currently split into several units:

- Faculty of Arts and Humanities
- Faculty of Business and Law
- Faculty of Health Sciences
- Faculty of Religious Studies and Philosophy
- Doctoral School
- School of Education
- Institute for Data Engineering and Sciences (IDEAS)
- Institute of Science and Environment (ISE)

== Courses offered ==
The University of Saint Joseph offers a board range of academic programmes at the Pre-University, Undergraduate and Post-Graduate level, as well as non-degree programs, offered through the Lifelong Learning Office.

=== Undergraduate Degree Programmes ===
List of Bachelor Degree Programmes:

- Biology and Biotechnology
- Architectural Studies
- Business Administration
- Christian Studies
- Communication and Media
- Design
- Digital Cinema
- Education
- Environmental Science
- Fashion Design
- Philosophy
- Portuguese-Chinese Studies (Language and Culture)
- Portuguese-Chinese Translation Studies
- Psychology
- Social Work

List of Pre-University:

- Foundation Year in Philosophy
- Pre-University

List of Associate Diploma Programs:

- Media Production
- Portuguese-Chinese Translation
- Product Design

=== Graduate Degree Programmes ===
List of Master Degree Programmes:

- Architecture
- Business Administration
- Catholic Studies 天主教研究
- Christian Studies
- Communication and Media
- Community Development
- Counselling and Psychotherapy
- Design (Specialisation in Interactive Design)
- Education
- Environmental Sciences and Management
- Government Studies
- History and Heritage Studies
- Lusophone and International Public Law
- Lusophone Studies in Linguistics and Literature
- Mestrado de Estudos Lusófonos em Linguística e Literatura
- Neuroscience and Behaviour
- Organisational Psychology
- Philosophy
- 教育碩士學位課程

List of Doctoral Degree Programmes:

- Business Administration
- Education
- Global Studies
- Government Studies
- History
- Information Systems
- Psychology
- Religious Studies
- Science

List of Post-Graduate Diploma programmes:

- Diploma de Pós-Graduação em Ciências Legislativas
- Diploma de Pós-Graduação em Educação
- Post-Graduate Diploma in Education
- Post-Graduate Diploma in Legislative Sciences
- 學位後教育文憑課程

== See also ==
- List of universities and colleges in Macau
