= Memorial (Jehovah's Witnesses) =

Annual religious event for Jehovah's Witnesses

Memorial of Jesus' Death
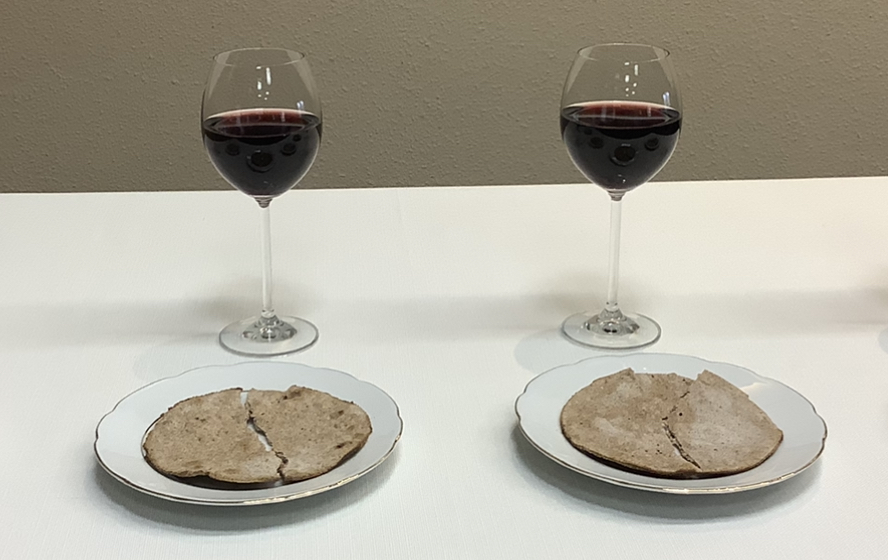
- The emblems of the Lord's Evening Meal, namely unleavened bread and unfortified red wine, are passed among congregants at the Memorial.
- Official name: Lord's Evening Meal
- Observed by: Jehovah's Witnesses
- Significance: Celebration of Jesus' sacrifice and memorialization of his death
- Observances: Worship services, communion
- Date: Nisan 14 (Note: The date is determined by identifying the new moon closest to the spring equinox as observed from Jerusalem, and counting 14 days from that new moon. See Quartodecimanism for further details.)
- 2025 date: Saturday 12 April
- 2026 date: Thursday 2 April
- 2027 date: Monday 22 March
- Frequency: Annual

The Lord's Evening Meal, also known as the Memorial of Jesus' Death, is an annual commemoration of the death of Jesus by Jehovah's Witnesses. Witnesses consider it the only religious event that Christians are commanded to observe by the Bible, as well as the most important day of the year. During the Memorial, unleavened bread and unfortified red wine symbolizing Jesus' body and blood respectively are passed among congregants, although only those who identify themselves as being part of the 144,000 "anointed" set to inherit Christ's heavenly kingdom may partake of the bread and wine.

== History ==
The first celebration of the Lord's Evening Meal by members of the Pittsburgh-based Bible Student movement took place in 1876. Attendance grew steadily over the years, with at least 90,434 Bible Students observing the Memorial in 1925. However, following Joseph Franklin Rutherford's failed prediction that the ancient patriarchs and prophets would be physically resurrected in the same year, Memorial attendance rapidly declined. The Memorial in 1928 had only 17,380 attendees, which prompted The Watchtower to temporarily cease reporting such yearly figures.

In 1935, as more non-committal individuals began to attend the Watch Tower Society's meetings, a distinction was made for the first time between those who believed that they were destined to rule in heaven with Jesus ("the anointed") and those who had an "earthly calling" to "live in an everlasting paradise on earth" ("the great crowd"). Until 1938, members of the "great crowd" were not permitted to join the Memorial.

During the COVID-19 pandemic, in-person Memorial services were suspended. In 2020, more than seventeen million people attended the Memorial virtually. On May 31, 2022, the Governing Body of Jehovah's Witnesses announced the resumption of in-person events, including the Memorial of Jesus' Death.

== Celebration ==
Although Jehovah's Witnesses typically eschew celebrating holidays, they regard the Memorial of Jesus' Death as the most important day of the year, as well as the one event that all Christians are commanded to commemorate in the Bible as found in 1 Corinthians 11:24. (Note: The New World Translation of the Holy Scriptures renders Jesus' command as "[...] Keep doing this in remembrance of me", thus emphasizing that the Memorial is "to be celebrated in perpetuity".) It is observed annually on the date on the Gregorian calendar that corresponds with the fourteenth day of the month Nisan, the eve of Passover, in the Hebrew lunisolar calendar, based on the calculations of the Governing Body of Jehovah's Witnesses.

For the weeks leading up to the Memorial, Witnesses listen to sermons about the subject and are assigned Bible readings from the chapters leading up to Jesus' death. Witnesses are especially encouraged to invite friends, family, and other members of the public to the Memorial. As a result, attendance at the Memorial is often much greater than that of other events organized by Jehovah's Witnesses.

During the Memorial, which is always held after sunset and lasts approximately one hour, two congregational hymns known as Kingdom songs are sung, one at the beginning and one at the end. A prayer is offered by an elder, and a talk is given on the fall of Adam and Eve, the importance of Jesus' death, and the distinction between the 144,000 "anointed" and the "great crowd".

At the end of the service, Witnesses observe the Lord's Evening Meal, a commemoration of the final meal that Jesus shared with his disciples in Jerusalem. The emblems of unleavened bread and unfortified red wine, representing Jesus' body and blood respectively, are passed among congregants. Jehovah's Witnesses do not permit substituting the wine with grape juice. The emblems are strictly regarded as symbols of Jesus' sacrifice and Jehovah's Witnesses reject concepts such as transubstantiation or consubstantiation.

The vast majority of Witnesses do not partake of the bread and wine, as they believe that only the 144,000 anointed individuals who will inherit the "spiritual Israel" in heaven are eligible to do so. For instance, the Memorial of Jesus' Death in 1993 was attended by some 11.4 million people, but there were only 8,693 partakers of the bread and wine. Given that there is no formal initiation process for the anointed, who are identified according to their "inner convictions", the Watch Tower Society has admitted that partakers of the bread and wine may not necessarily be genuine anointed Witnesses.

== Location ==
The Memorial is usually held at Kingdom Halls, Jehovah's Witnesses' designated places of worship. In areas where a larger attendance is expected, event venues may be rented. In any case, Jehovah's Witnesses avoid locations that they deem to be extravagant, given that the final meal that Jesus himself shared with his disciples took place in a simple dining room. While there is no official dress code, attendees are typically expected to dress "modestly and respectfully".

== See also ==
- Jehovah's Witnesses beliefs
- Jehovah's Witnesses practices
