= Jehovah's Witnesses practices =

Jehovah's Witnesses' practices are based on the biblical interpretations of Charles Taze Russell (1852–1916), founder (c. 1881) of the Bible Student movement, and of successive presidents of the Watch Tower Society, Joseph Franklin Rutherford (from 1917 to 1942) and Nathan Homer Knorr (from 1942 to 1977). Since 1976, practices have also been based on decisions made at closed meetings of the denomination's Governing Body. The denomination disseminates instructions regarding activities and acceptable behavior through The Watchtower magazine and other official publications, and at congregation meetings and conventions.

Jehovah's Witnesses believe that human society is under the control of Satan. They endeavor to "remain 'without spot from the world'", which they regard as "society alienated from God", avoiding that which they think may "offend Jehovah". Witnesses refuse to participate in any political and military activity and are told to limit social contact with non-Witnesses. The denomination requires adherence to a strict moral code, which forbids premarital sex, homosexuality, gender transitioning, adultery, smoking, drunkenness and drug abuse, and blood transfusions.

Elder committees maintain discipline within congregations, exercising the power to expel members who breach the denomination's rules and to demand their shunning by other Witnesses. The threat of shunning also serves to deter members from dissident behavior.

Members are expected to participate regularly in evangelizing work and to attend congregation meetings and conventions that present material based on Watch Tower Society publications.

== Worship ==
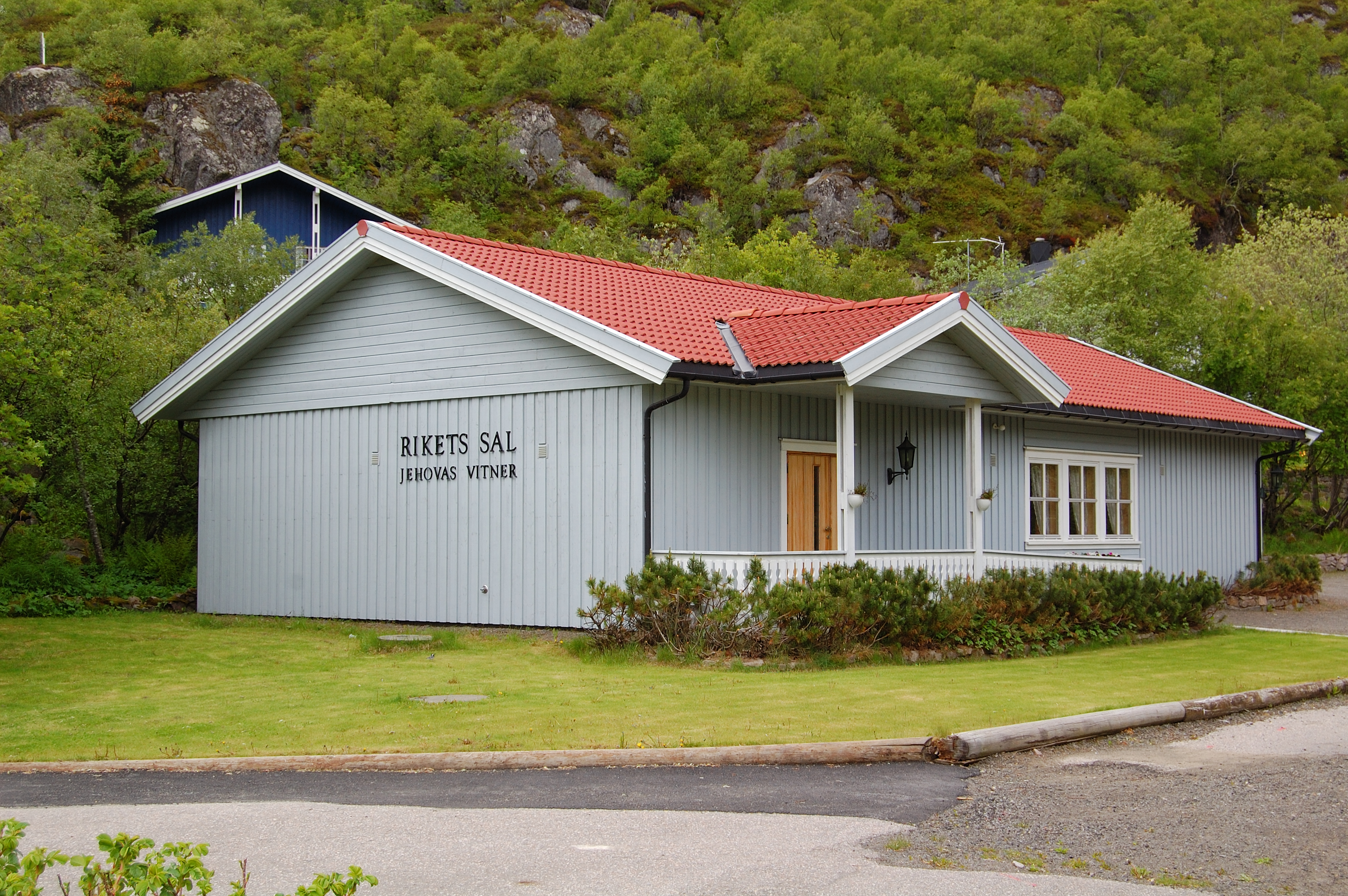
A Kingdom Hall of Jehovah's Witnesses in Lofoten, Norway

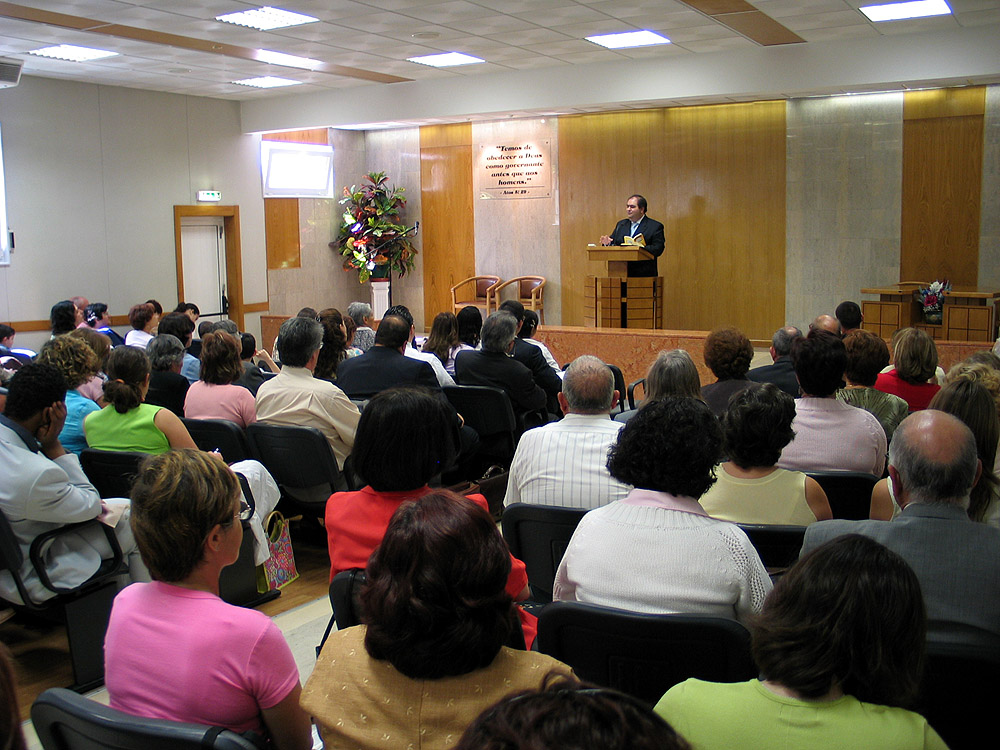
Worship at a Kingdom Hall in Portugal

Meetings for worship and study are held at Kingdom Halls, and are open to the public. Witnesses are assigned to a congregation in which "territory" they reside. They are expected to attend weekly meetings as scheduled by the Watch Tower Society and congregation elders. The meetings are largely devoted to study of the Bible and Witness doctrines. During meetings and in other formal circumstances, Witnesses refer to one another as "Brother" and "Sister".

Sociologist Andrew Holden claims meetings create an atmosphere of uniformity for Witnesses, intensify their sense of belonging to a religious community, and reinforce the plausibility of the organization's belief system. He states that they are also important in helping new converts adopt a different way of life. According to The Watchtower, one role of the frequency of meetings is to protect Witnesses from becoming "involved in the affairs of the world". Witnesses are told they "should never miss a meeting unless there is a serious reason".

The form and content of the meetings is established by the denomination's New York headquarters, generally involving a consideration of the same subject matter worldwide each week. Two meetings each week are divided into five distinct sections, lasting a total of three and one half hours. Meetings are opened and closed with hymns, which they refer to as Kingdom songs, and brief prayers delivered from the platform. Witnesses are urged to prepare for all meetings by studying Watch Tower Society literature from which the content is drawn and looking up the scriptures cited in the articles.

Kingdom Halls are typically functional in character, and do not contain religious symbols. Each year, Witnesses from several congregations, which form a "circuit", gather for two one-day assemblies. Several circuits meet once a year for a three-day "regional convention". Every few years the Governing Body of Jehovah's Witnesses hold "international conventions" in selected cities around the world. These larger gatherings are usually held at rented stadiums or auditoriums. Their most important and solemn event is the celebration of the "Lord's Evening Meal", or "Memorial of Christ's Death".

During the COVID-19 pandemic, Jehovah's Witnesses' meetings and conventions in many areas were held virtually, using videoconferencing software and video presentations.

=== Weekend meeting ===
The weekend meeting comprises a 30-minute public talk by a congregation elder or ministerial servant and a one-hour question-and-answer session of a Bible-based article from The Watchtower magazine, with questions prepared by the Watch Tower Society and the answers provided in the magazine. Members may use their own words to express the ideas in the printed material, though personal ideas derived from independent study are discouraged.

=== Midweek meeting ===
The midweek meeting, typically held in the evening, includes a question-and-answer session based on Watch Tower Society publications, Bible reading, sample presentations about how to use Watch Tower Society literature for Bible studies and public preaching, and a "Congregation Bible Study" in the format of a question-and-answer session based on a Watch Tower Society publication.

=== Family Worship evening ===
In addition to the two weekly scheduled meetings, the Watch Tower Society recommends that Witnesses maintain a weekly "Family Worship evening"—using the time previously allocated for a third weekly meeting—for family and personal study. No specific format for the Family Worship evening is provided, but the Society recommends that members consider Watch Tower Society publications during this time.

=== Memorial of Christ's death ===
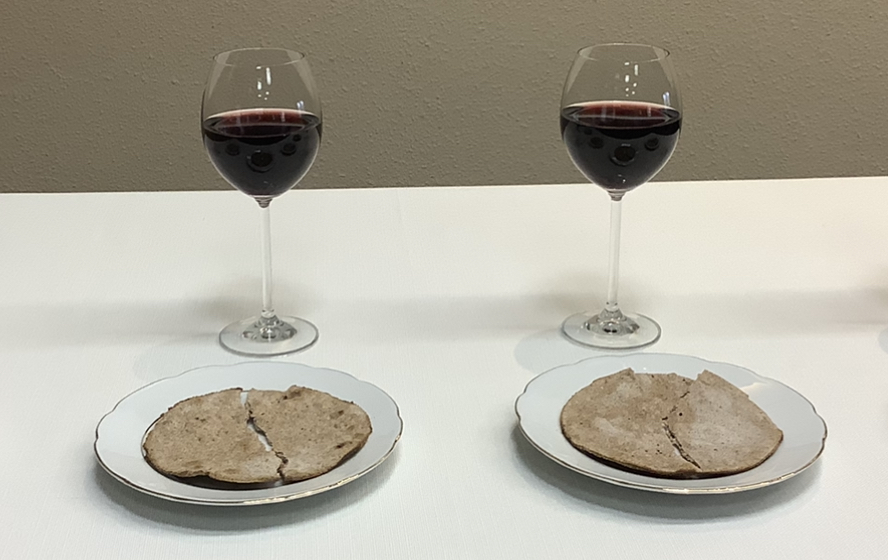
The bread and wine which is passed among congregants during the Memorial

Jehovah's Witnesses commemorate Christ's death as a ransom or "propitiatory sacrifice" by observing the Lord's Evening Meal, or Memorial. They celebrate it once per year, noting that it was instituted on the Passover, an annual festival. They observe it on Nisan 14 according to the ancient Jewish calendar that is lunisolar. They are taught that this is the only celebration the Bible commands Christians to observe. In the days leading up to the Memorial, Bible reading is assigned from chapters about the days leading up to Jesus' death.

Of those who attend the Memorial, a small minority worldwide partake of the unleavened bread and wine. This is because Jehovah's Witnesses believe that the majority of the faithful have an earthly hope. Only those who believe they have a heavenly hope, the "remnant" (those still living) of the 144,000 "anointed", partake of the bread and wine. In 2025, approximately 20.5 million people attended, and about 24,600 members partook.

The Memorial, held after sunset, includes a talk on the meaning of the celebration and the circulation among the audience of unadulterated red wine and unleavened bread. Jehovah's Witnesses believe the bread symbolizes Jesus' body which he gave on behalf of mankind, and that the wine symbolizes his blood which redeems from sin. They do not believe in transubstantiation or consubstantiation. Because many congregations have no members who claim to be anointed, it is common for no one to partake of the bread and wine.

=== Assemblies and conventions ===
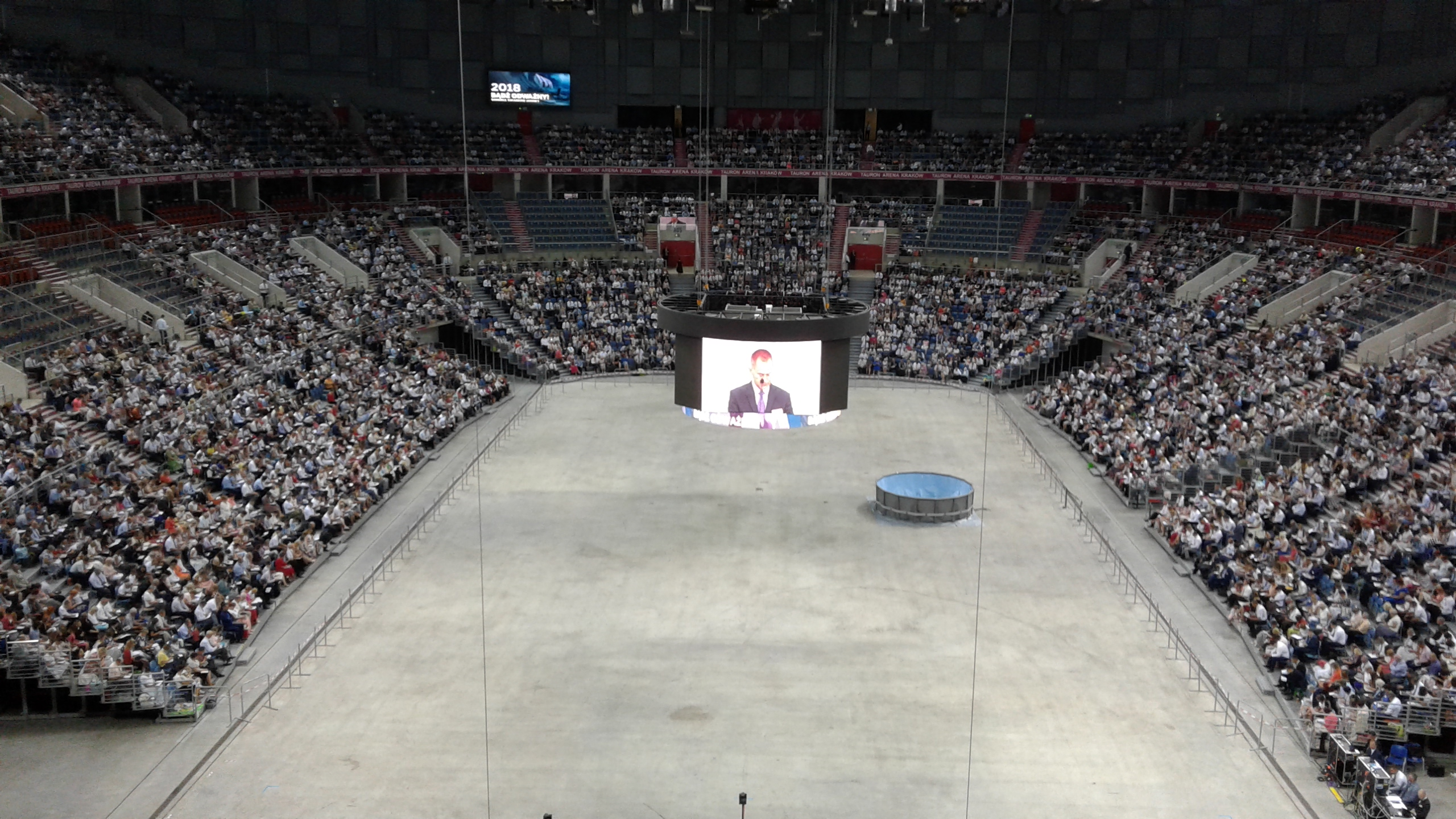
A Jehovah's Witnesses Convention in Kraków, Poland

Each year, Jehovah's Witnesses hold two one-day "Circuit Assemblies", held in each circuit worldwide. Each circuit comprises several congregations in a geographical area. These are held either in Assembly Halls owned by Jehovah's Witnesses, or in rented facilities, such as public auditoriums. Once a year, Jehovah's Witnesses gather at larger assemblies called "Regional Conventions" which are usually three days long, Friday to Sunday. These conventions consist primarily of Bible-based talks, dramatizations, and videos, including demonstrations and experiences of their preaching work.

Conventions feature a baptism talk followed by the baptism of new members. Every few years, "International Conventions" are held in selected cities, with visiting delegates from other countries. Attendance at some of these international conventions has exceeded one hundred thousand. The 1958 international convention in New York at Yankee Stadium and the Polo Grounds had a peak attendance exceeding 253,000.

== Evangelism ==
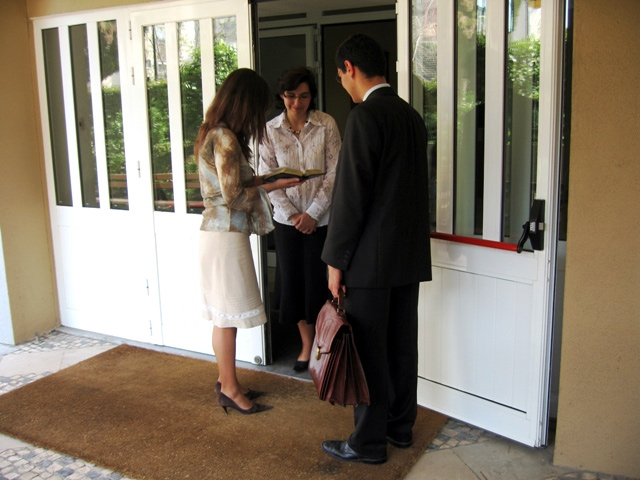
Jehovah's Witnesses preaching in Lisbon, Portugal

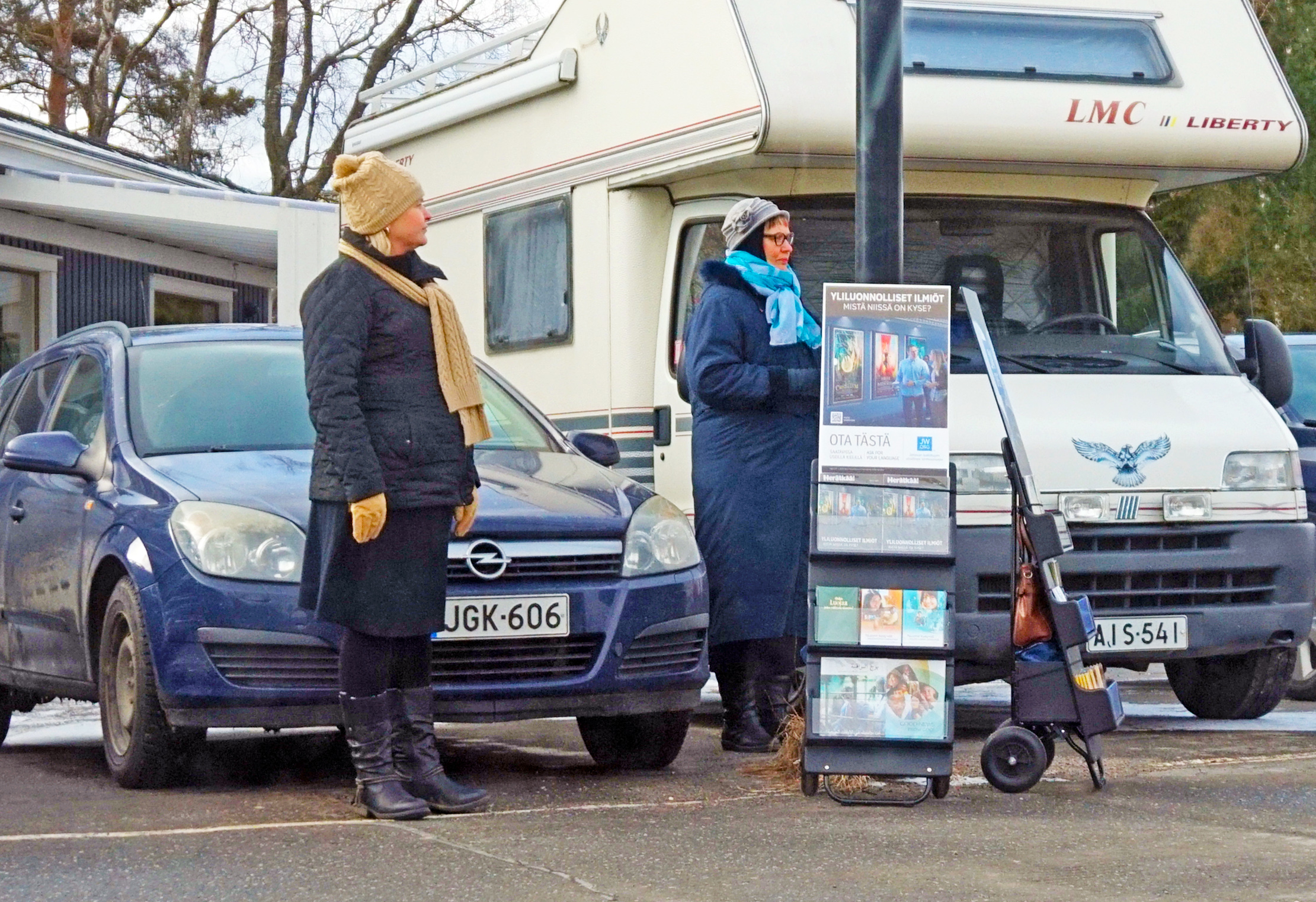
Jehovah's Witnesses cart witnessing in Tuuri, Finland

Jehovah's Witnesses believe they are under obligation to God to "give witness" by participating in organized and spontaneous evangelizing and proselytizing work. Prospective members are told they have a moral obligation to serve as "publishers" by "regular and zealous" participation in the Witnesses' organised preaching work, disseminating Watch Tower doctrines as evangelists of "the Truth". Qualifying as an "unbaptized publisher" is a requirement for baptism, and baptism is regarded as an automatic ordination as a minister.

Watch Tower publications describe house-to-house visitations as the primary work of Jehovah's Witnesses in obedience to a "divine command" to preach "the Kingdom good news in all the earth and (make) disciples of people of all the nations". Children usually accompany their parents and participate in the public ministry. In addition to taking part in organized door-to-door preaching, Witnesses are taught that they should seek opportunities to "witness informally" by starting conversations with people they meet during routine activities such as shopping or on public transport, and directing the conversation towards their beliefs.

Witnesses are told that they should put the interests of "God's Kingdom" first in their lives and that other secular and recreational pursuits should remain secondary to spiritual matters. Witnesses are frequently instructed through Watch Tower Society publications, and at meetings and conventions, to increase the quality and quantity of their preaching efforts. Watch Tower Society publications suggest that endurance in public preaching is a requirement for Witnesses to attain salvation.

Members who commit themselves to evangelize for 600 hours per year, an average of 50 hours per month, are called regular pioneers. Those who commit themselves to evangelize for 30 hours for one month are called auxiliary pioneers, which they may do for consecutive months. Some Witnesses volunteer for missionary service, and may be invited to receive specialized training at the Watchtower Bible School of Gilead. These individuals dedicate, on average, more than 120 hours per month to their work. Members who are not able to 'pioneer' are told they may maintain the "pioneer spirit", by "encouraging those who can pioneer, by instilling in their children the desire to pursue a career in full-time service, and by sharing diligently in preaching according to their circumstances".

Specialized "territory" maps of residential and commercial areas are prepared within the boundaries of each congregation's territory and distributed to publishers who are responsible for preaching within that area. Witnesses are instructed to fill out monthly report slips about their preaching activity. For many years, these reports included the number of hours spent preaching, along with the amount of literature placed and the number of Bible studies conducted. As of November 2023, most members are only required to report that they engaged in any preaching activity for the month as well as the number of Bible studies conducted; members who have agreed to a specific hour requirement—for example, pioneers—still report the number of hours. The reports are used to help measure the spirituality of individuals. and to establish the eligibility of men as congregation elders and ministerial servants. A Witness who fails to report for a month is termed an "irregular publisher". One who has not turned in a field service report for six months consecutively is termed an "inactive publisher".

Witnesses have, in the past, used a wide variety of methods to spread their faith, including information marches, where members wore sandwich boards and handed out leaflets, to sound cars (car-mounted phonographs), and syndicated newspaper columns and radio segments devoted to sermons. Between 1924 and 1957, the organization operated a radio station, WBBR, from New York. Since 2011, the Witnesses have engaged in "public witnessing" in metropolitan districts and fairs using tables, carts, and literature displays. The Watch Tower Society operates a website, JW.org, which provides access to Watch Tower Society literature and video streaming.

During the COVID-19 pandemic, Jehovah's Witnesses focused on alternative methods of evangelism such as online web applications, telephone, email, SMS texting, and postal mail.

== Watch Tower Society literature ==
Jehovah's Witnesses make extensive use of Watch Tower Society literature, including books, magazines, booklets and handbills, to spread their beliefs and to use as textbooks at their religious meetings. The publications are produced in many languages, with a small selection available in 500 languages. Their magazines, The Watchtower and Awake!, are published in hundreds of languages and in various electronic formats. Issues of both magazines are compiled annually into bound volumes.

New books, brochures, and other items are released at their annual conventions. Various audio cassettes, videocassettes, and DVDs have been produced explaining the group's beliefs, practices, organization and history. Since 1942 all Watch Tower literature has been published anonymously. Many Watch Tower Society publications from 1950 onward are available on the Watchtower Library DVD and online.

Publications were sold to the public until the early 1990s, from which time they were offered free of charge, with a request for donations. The change in policy was first announced in the United States in February 1990, following the loss of a case before the US Supreme Court by Jimmy Swaggart Ministries on the issue of sales tax exemption for religious groups. The Watch Tower Society had joined the case as an Amicus curiae, or "friend of the court". The court ruling would have resulted in the Watch Tower Society having to pay millions of dollars in sales tax if sales of their literature had continued.

Witnesses are urged to prepare for congregation meetings by studying the assigned Watch Tower literature, One analysis noted that each year Witnesses are expected to read more than 3,000 pages of the Society's publications, according to its suggested program for personal study. Much of the literature is illustrated extensively, with sociologist Andrew Holden observing utopian, post-Armageddon images of happy Witnesses in bright sunshine and pristine environments, often playing with formerly wild animals such as lions and tigers, in contrast to dark-colored images of unfavorable activities such as murders, burglaries and promiscuity that highlight the moral dangers outside the organization.

== Conversion ==
Individuals seeking to be baptised as Jehovah's Witnesses are required to follow a systematic, catechistical Bible study course, usually in their home, for several months. They will be expected to attend meetings at the Kingdom Hall and must demonstrate a willingness to carry out the doorstep ministry. Before baptism they will have discussions with the elders based on questions provided by the Watch Tower Society to determine that they understand and accept the beliefs of the Witnesses, and that they accept Jesus' ransom sacrifice and repent of sins and have made a personal dedication to God.

Baptisms are normally performed in pools at assemblies and conventions. At these baptisms, candidates make "public declaration" of their prior dedication to God. The speaker asks the candidates the following two questions:

1. "Have you repented of your sins, dedicated yourself to Jehovah, and accepted his way of salvation through Jesus Christ?"
2. "Do you understand that your baptism identifies you as one of Jehovah's Witnesses in association with Jehovah's organization?"

After candidates agree to both questions, they line up to undergo water immersion, usually in quick succession, often with hundreds baptised at large conventions.

Sociologist James A. Beckford reported two significant distinguishing features of the conversion process when related by Jehovah's Witnesses. He said they typically spoke of their conversion experience as a steady progression of mental states in which Witnesses "'work for' their conversion by a methodical confrontation with intellectual obstacles, and by a deliberate programme of self-reform. Conversion is not represented as something which happened to them; it is framed as something that they achieved." Beckford noted that those he interviewed regarded sudden, emotional upheavals in religious consciousness as suspect: "Experiences which smack of sudden or idiosyncratic illumination/revelation cannot be reconcilable with either the tenor of God's historical practice or the nature of his special covenant with the Watchtower Society."

He also found a striking contrast with other churches in the common attribution of responsibility for conversion to "a spiritual guide [...] the person who acted as the intermediary with the Watchtower movement and who supervised the initial process of learning and reforming". Beckford cited an interview "representative of many" in which a convert recalled initially resisting the Watch Tower Society's teachings until he was "talked into making a serious study of the scriptures [...] I had plenty of objections and was sure the Witnesses were wrong, but (the Witness leading the personal Bible study sessions) showed me how the facts of the Bible could not be faulted".

== Ministers and ordination ==
Jehovah's Witnesses consider as "ministers" all adherents who have been approved to engage in formal evangelizing. Witnesses consider their baptisms to be ordinations; unbaptized publishers are considered "regular ministers" whereas baptized publishers are considered "ordained ministers". Witnesses recognize that many government and administrative precedents for ministers are not intended to include all active adherents. For example, only elders assert ecclesiastical privilege and confessional privilege.

Only males may be appointed as elders and ministerial servants (their term for deacons). Only baptized males may officiate at weddings, funerals, and baptisms. A female Witness minister may only lead congregational prayer and teaching in unusual circumstances, and must wear a head covering while doing so. Outside the congregation, a female minister wears a head covering when she leads spiritual teaching in the presence of her husband, according to the Christian complementarian view. Female headcovering is not required for other forms of teaching, or when participating in congregation meetings being led by another. According to the Watch Tower Society, some courts in the United States have recognized that full-time Jehovah's Witness appointees, such as "pioneers" and those in the faith's religious order, qualify for ministerial exemptions regardless of gender.

== Discipline ==
Formal discipline is administered by congregation elders. In the event that an accusation of serious sin is made concerning a baptized member, the elders will talk to the accused individual. If it is determined that a serious sin has been committed, a tribunal of usually three elders is formed to determine guilt, administer help and possibly apply sanctions.

Shunning is the most severe form of discipline administered; for many years, the procedure was referred to as disfellowshipping; however, the term was discontinued in 2024, and is instead referred to as removal from the congregation. Before taking this step, a committee of elders decides whether the individual has committed a "serious sin" and that there is no evidence of true repentance. To judge that repentance is genuine, members of the committee ask questions and review the actions of the accused member. Baptized members who spread teachings contrary to the doctrines of Jehovah's Witnesses can be expelled for apostasy. A 1981 letter to overseers—reproduced in a book by former Governing Body member Raymond Franz—directed that a member who rejects Jehovah's Witnesses' teachings and "persists in believing other doctrine", even without promoting such beliefs, may be subject to disfellowshipping,

Once the decision of expulsion has been made, a person has seven days to appeal, after which, if the person has not appealed, an announcement is made to the congregation that the individual is "no longer one of Jehovah's Witnesses". Members of the congregation are then expected to shun the individual. Exceptions include necessary commercial dealings or a shunned person living with baptized family members. In such a case, the Witness is not permitted to speak about religious matters with that person, except in the case of parents conducting a Bible study with a minor. The extent to which shunned relatives living in the same household are included in family life is left to the discretion of the Witness family members. Relatives of shunned individuals who are not in the same household have minimal contact. As of March 2024, members are permitted to invite shunned individuals to congregation meetings or offer brief greetings at meetings, unless the individual is deemed to be an apostate.

Reproof involves sins that could lead to shunning, but for which the individual is deemed repentant. Reproof is given "before all onlookers", based on their interpretation of 1 Timothy 5:20. If the sin is private in nature, the reproof would involve just the individual(s) involved. If the sin is known generally by the entire congregation or the community, an announcement is made informing the congregation that the person has been reproved. Later, without disclosing names or private details, one of the elders gives a separate talk ensuring that the congregation understands the sin, its dangers, and how to avoid it.

Reproved individuals have some congregation privileges restricted, until the elders decide that the member has regained "spiritual strength." Restrictions may include not sharing in meeting parts, not commenting at meeting parts, and not praying for a group. The duration of restrictions depends on the elders. One cannot "pioneer" or "auxiliary pioneer" for at least one year after reproof is given.

Marking is practiced if a member's course of action is regarded as a violation of Bible principles, reflecting badly on the congregation, but is not considered a serious sin for which the individual may be formally shunned. Congregation members who become aware of another member's errant behaviour may 'mark' the individual, and are advised to limit social contact with that person. "Marked" individuals are not shunned completely, but social contact is minimized.

== Family life ==
The family structure is patriarchal. The husband is considered the final authority of family decisions, as the head of his family. Marriages must be monogamous. Wives should be submissive to their husbands and husbands are to have deep respect and love for their wives, and are instructed to listen to them on all matters.

Husbands are instructed to treat their wives as Jesus treated his followers. He should not hurt or mistreat his family in any way. The father should be hard-working in providing necessities to his family. He must provide for them in a spiritual capacity. This includes religious instruction for the family, and taking the lead in preaching activities. Parental discipline for children should not be in a harsh, cruel way. Children are instructed to obey their parents.

Married couples are encouraged to speak with local elders if they are having problems. Married couples can separate in the case of physical abuse and neglect, or if one partner attempts to hinder the other from being a Jehovah's Witness. Remarriage after divorce is permissible only on the grounds of adultery, based on their understanding of Matthew 5:32 and Matthew 19:9.

== Morality ==
Jehovah's Witnesses demand high standards of morality within their ranks. Their view of sexual behavior reflects conservative Christian views. Abortion is considered murder. Homosexuality, premarital sex, and extramarital sex are considered "serious sins". Gender transitioning is considered "contrary to nature" and sex reassignment surgery is considered a form of "mutilation". If a transgender person "who has already undergone a mutilating operation of this sort" wishes to become a member of the denomination, the person is expected to live according to their biological sex, and to leave their spouse if biologically the same sex.

Smoking, including electronic cigarettes, abuse of drugs, and drunkenness are prohibited. Alcohol is permitted in moderation. Modesty in dress and grooming is frequently stressed. Entertainment promoting immoral, "demonic", or violent themes is considered inappropriate. Members are warned that personal grooming such as long hair or earrings for men, or other styles of dress or grooming might "stumble" the consciences of others. In 2024, the dressing standards were relaxed for congregation-sponsored events; men were allowed to have beards and attend meetings without a suit or tie, and women were allowed to wear slacks.

Gambling by making money through the losses of others is viewed as a "form of greed", and is prohibited. The trading of stocks, shares and bonds is viewed as acceptable.

== Blood ==
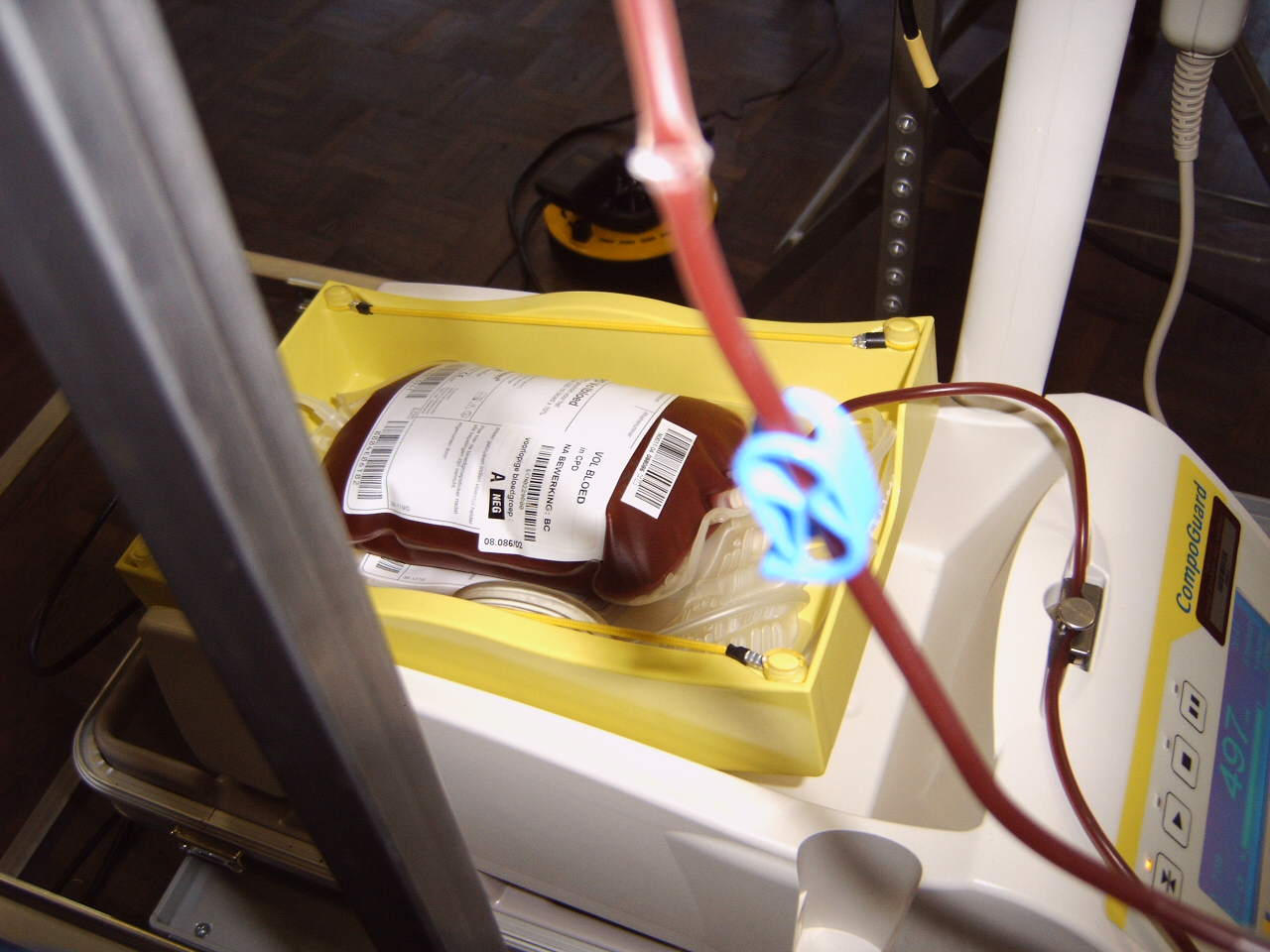
Jehovah's Witnesses officially reject transfusions of whole allogeneic blood and some of its fractionated components.

Jehovah's Witnesses are taught that the Bible prohibits the consumption, storage and transfusion of blood, based on their understanding of scriptures such as Leviticus 17:10, 11: "I will certainly set my face against the one who is eating the blood" and Acts 15:29: "abstain from … blood." This standpoint is applied even in emergencies. The Watchtower introduced this view in 1945, and it has developed since then. Accordingly, the organization has established Hospital Information Services (HIS), which provides education and facilitation of bloodless surgery. This service also maintains Hospital Liaison Committees, which support adherents facing surgery and provide information to the medical community on bloodless surgery techniques and alternatives to blood.

Though accepted by most members, some within the Jehovah's Witness community do not endorse the doctrine.

Dutch anthropologist Richard Singelenberg has suggested the Watch Tower Society's prohibition on blood transfusions—as well as its edict against fellowship with outsiders—are rooted in the religious desire to maintain a communal state of purity worthy of divine favor. He noted: "Rules of pollution and purity are instrumental in creating structural boundaries around group members. And the more distinctive when formulated into divine precepts, the clearer the dividing lines between the faithful and those excluded."

== Spiritual warfare ==
Watch Tower Society publications teach that Witnesses are engaged in a "spiritual, theocratic warfare" against false teachings and wicked spirit forces they say try to impede them in their preaching work. Based on their interpretation of Ephesians 6:10–20, they believe their "spiritual war" is fought with truth, righteousness, the "good news of peace", faith, the hope of salvation, God's word and prayer. They have advocated the use of "theocratic war strategy" to protect the interests of God's cause, which would include hiding the truth from God's "enemies" by being evasive or withholding truthful or incriminating information from those not entitled to know.

The Watchtower told Witnesses: "It is proper to cover over our arrangements for the work that God commands us to do. If the wolfish foes draw wrong conclusions from our maneuvers to outwit them, no harm has been done to them by the harmless sheep, innocent in their motives as doves."

== Separateness ==
Jehovah's Witnesses are told they should remain "separate from the world" in harmony with Jesus' description of his followers at John 17:14–16. Watch Tower publications define the "world" as "the mass of mankind apart from Jehovah’s approved servants" and teach that it is ruled by Satan and a place of danger and moral contamination. Witnesses manifest their world-renouncing beliefs in many ways. They avoid involvement in social controversies, remain politically neutral, and do not seek public office. The Watch Tower Society has stated that voting in political elections is a personal conscience decision, though a Witness who takes any action considered to be a "violation of Christian neutrality" may face religious sanctions.

They refuse participation in ecumenical and interfaith activities. They abstain from celebrating religious holidays, and reject many customs they claim have pagan origins. They do not work in industries associated with the military, nor serve in the armed services. They refuse national military service, which in some countries may result in their arrest and imprisonment. They do not salute or pledge allegiance to national flags or sing national anthems or other patriotic songs.

Witnesses are urged to minimize their social contact with non-members, even if they possess "decent qualities", because of perceived dangers of worldly association. Sociologist Andrew Holden indicated they are highly selective in choosing with whom they spend leisure time, generally choosing the company of other Witnesses. Many Witnesses whom he interviewed reported tensions and ostracism at work because of their religious beliefs. He reported that many Jehovah's Witness converts required some social adjustment as they gradually reduced contact with non-Witness friends.

Association with those outside the organization, commonly termed by Witnesses as "worldly" and "not in the Truth", is acceptable only when it is viewed as an opportunity to preach. Witnesses are under considerable pressure from the Society to show outsiders they are people of high moral fiber. Holden claims that as a result, Witnesses working with "worldly" colleagues tend to closely adhere to Watch Tower teachings.

Sociologist Ronald Lawson has suggested that it is the group's intellectual and organizational isolation—coupled with the intense indoctrination of adherents, rigid internal discipline and considerable persecution—that has contributed to the consistency of its sense of urgency in its apocalyptic message.

== Celebrations ==
Weddings, anniversaries, and funerals are observed, though they avoid incorporating traditions they see to have pagan origins. The Watchtower has stated that the use of wedding rings by Witnesses is acceptable, even though wedding rings may have first been used by pagans, based on its conclusion that there is no definite evidence wedding rings were used "as part of false religious practices" (emphasis from original). Witnesses typically observe wedding anniversaries, with the Watch Tower Society noting that wedding anniversaries apparently do not stem from pagan origins.

Other common celebrations and religious or national holidays such as birthdays, Halloween, Easter and Christmas are not celebrated because they believe that these "continue to involve false religious beliefs or activities that violate Bible principles." Watch Tower Society publications rule out the celebration of Mother's Day because of a claimed link with pagan gods and concerns that giving "special honor and worship" to mothers is a form of "creature worship" that could turn people away from God. The Society also tells Witnesses that May Day, New Year's Day and Valentine's Day celebrations have pagan origins and should be avoided.

Watch Tower Society publications note that the only birthday celebrations explicitly mentioned in the Bible are those of an unnamed Pharaoh and Herod Antipas, that both were associated with executions, and that neither celebrant was a servant of God. Though some churches interpret Job 1:4 to indicate birthday feasts of Job's sons, Jehovah's Witnesses interpret them as a circuit of feasts from one house to the next. The Bible does not show Jesus or his apostles celebrating birthdays and The Watchtower claims the absence of any record of the date of the birth of Jesus or his apostles indicates that "God does not want us to celebrate any of these birthdays".

== Construction ==
International and regional building teams frequently undertake constructions of Kingdom Halls over the course of one or two weekends, termed "quick-builds". Larger construction projects, including building regional Assembly Halls and Bethel offices, factories, residences, warehouses, and farm facilities, are also performed almost entirely by volunteer members.

== Humanitarian efforts ==
Jehovah's Witnesses provide relief assistance in disaster-stricken areas for their members and others in the vicinity. Medicine and clothing were provided to both Hutu and Tutsi Witnesses during the 1994 Rwandan genocide. Following Hurricane Katrina, they helped rebuild houses of Witnesses and others. The Governing Body of Jehovah's Witnesses uses "Regional Building Committees" to oversee relief efforts worldwide.

== Funding of activities ==
Jehovah's Witnesses fund their activities, such as publishing, constructing and operating facilities, evangelism, and disaster relief via donations. There is no tithing or collection, but members are reminded to donate to the organization; Witnesses may provide an opportunity for members of the public to make donations as they encounter them in their preaching work. Donation boxes labeled for several purposes are located in Kingdom Halls and other meeting facilities. Generally there are contribution boxes for local operating expenses, a Kingdom Hall fund for helping Witnesses around the world to build Kingdom Halls, and a general fund for the "Worldwide Work", which includes the printing of literature, organization of conventions, supporting missionaries and disaster relief, and other operating expenses of the organization.

The accounts (including donations) and the financial operation of the local congregation are reviewed monthly and posted on a congregation notice board. Donations are also accepted via mail, and the Watch Tower Bible and Tract Society can be named as a beneficiary to an estate, and also accepts donations in the form of life insurance policies, pension plans, bank accounts, certificates of deposit, retirement accounts, stocks and bonds, real estate, annuities and trusts.

== Bibliography ==
- Chryssides, George D. (2008). Historical Dictionary of Jehovah's Witnesses. Scarecrow Press, Rowman & Littlefield. ISBN 978-0-8108-6074-2.
- Franz, Raymond (2002). Crisis of Conscience (4th ed.). Commentary Press. ISBN 0-914675-24-9.
- Franz, Raymond (2007). In Search of Christian Freedom (2nd ed.). Commentary Press. ISBN 978-0-914675-17-4.
- Holden, Andrew (2002). Jehovah's Witnesses: Portrait of a Contemporary Religious Movement. Routledge. ISBN 0-415-26610-6.
- Penton, James M. (1997). Apocalypse Delayed: The Story of Jehovah's Witnesses (2nd ed.). University of Toronto Press. ISBN 0-8020-7973-3.
