= Kingdom song =

Hymns sung by Jehovah's Witnesses

Kingdom songs are the hymns sung by Jehovah's Witnesses at their religious meetings. The current hymnal used by the organization is "Sing Out Joyfully" to Jehovah. In addition to the current and previous hymnals containing sheet music and lyrics, releases in various audio formats have included vocals in several languages, piano instrumentals, and orchestral arrangements. The name "Kingdom songs" is in reference to God's Kingdom.

== Use in worship ==
Typically, Jehovah's Witnesses sing three songs at their meetings for worship. The entire congregation sings, accompanied by an orchestral recording. Meetings open and close with a song and prayer, along with a song during an interlude between the two or three sections of the meeting. Songs are selected to match the theme of the meeting program. The song used to introduce the public talk is normally chosen by the speaker. Songs are used at assemblies and conventions, and sometimes at different events at Watch Tower Society branch offices. Jehovah's Witnesses' publications suggest that Witnesses listen to this music in their personal time.

== History ==
In the late 19th century, the Bible Students (from which Jehovah's Witnesses arose) used many well-known songs and melodies. They also used well-known melodies with their own lyrics. The prefaces of Songs of the Bride and Poems and Hymns of Dawn indicate that these hymnals include hymns adapted from other Protestant hymnals such as Hymns of the Morning, Gospel Hymns, Jubilee Harp, Winnowed Hymns, Epworth Hymnal and Songs of Pilgrimage. These melodies were often works of famous composers, including Ludwig van Beethoven and Joseph Haydn. Lyrics were often adapted from works of famous hymnal writers including Philip P. Bliss, Horatius Bonar, Fanny Crosby, Philip Doddridge, Thomas Hastings, John Newton, Isaac Watts, and Charles Wesley.

In 1877, Charles Taze Russell and Nelson H. Barbour announced Songs of the Morning in their book Three Worlds. Songs of the Bride, a collection of 144 songs, was published in 1879. In 1890, Poems and Hymns of the Millennial Dawn—with 151 poems and 333 songs, most of which were well-known compositions—was released and became the group's official hymnal until 1928. This was followed by lyrics for 11 songs appearing in the February 1, 1896 issue of The Watchtower, under the title Zion's Glad Songs of the Morning, written by members of the denomination. A supplement of 81 songs was released in 1900, many written by a single individual, under the title Zion's Glad Songs.

Two revised editions of this hymnal were released between 1902 and 1908. In 1905, the 333 songs published in 1890 along with musical notation were released under the title, Hymns of the Millennial Dawn. This book was released in a number of other languages, mainly in a shortened form. In 1925, Kingdom Hymns was published, with 80 songs intended for children and youths. In 1928 Songs of Praise to Jehovah was released, which included 337 songs.

Following the adoption of the name “Jehovah's witnesses” in 1931, the Kingdom Service Song Book was released in 1944 (and revised in 1948), which included 62 songs. This was followed by the release of Songs to Jehovah's Praise in 1950, with 91 songs. Some of the music was from hymn tunes of other churches or based on themes from classical music;(for example, Beethoven's Piano Sonata No. 23 in F minor, op. 57 ("Appassionata"). Others used relatively new music, some of which is still used.

With the 1966 release of Singing and Accompanying Yourselves with Music in Your Hearts, a policy was introduced to use only songs written by Witnesses. Subsequent collections were released in 1984 and in 2009, each retaining, retiring or revising previous songs and introducing new songs. By 2019, the hymnal "Sing Out Joyfully" to Jehovah was available in over 200 languages, including several sign languages. This is the current hymnal used by the organization.

== Collections ==
=== Singing and Accompanying ===
Singing and Accompanying Yourselves with Music in Your Hearts was released in 1966, with 119 songs. Melodies identified as not having been written by Jehovah's Witnesses were not retained. For the first time, a policy was adopted of including only material written and composed by Jehovah's Witnesses, though some songs composed by non-Witnesses were unintentionally included.

=== Kingdom Melodies ===
A series of light orchestral arrangements of Kingdom songs entitled Kingdom Melodies was first released in 1980. The earlier recordings in the series were from the 1966 hymnal Singing and Accompanying Yourselves With Music in Your Hearts and the later ones from Sing Praises to Jehovah.

Installments of Kingdom Melodies were issued in cassette and phonograph formats annually during the 1980s. From 1996 to 2000, the series was re-issued as nine volumes on CD. In 2006, the series was released on CD in MP3 format. Since September 2008, the songs have also been made available for download.

=== Sing Praises to Jehovah ===
In 1984, Sing Praises to Jehovah was released, with 225 songs. It was subsequently introduced in many other languages. Many songs in Sing Praises to Jehovah were present in the previous two books; some that were found not to have been written by members of Jehovah's Witnesses were excluded.

=== Sing to Jehovah ===
In 2009, the release of a new hymnal, Sing to Jehovah, was announced. It contains 135 songs, including 42 new songs, and alterations to the melodies and lyrics of others. Reduced editions comprising 55 songs are available in less common languages. Six volumes of orchestral and vocal arrangements based on 114 songs from Sing to Jehovah have also been released. On October 4, 2014, a revised edition of the songbook was announced, with a number of new songs. On February 5, 2016, an additional 5 songs were released.

=== "Sing Out Joyfully" to Jehovah ===
A new songbook entitled "Sing Out Joyfully" to Jehovah containing 151 songs, including 19 new songs and excluding 3 songs of the previous hymnal, was released at the annual meeting of the Watch Tower Bible and Tract Society of Pennsylvania on October 1, 2016. One objective of the revision was to update phrasing to be consistent with renderings in the 2013 revision of the New World Translation of the Holy Scriptures. This is the current hymnal in use by Jehovah's Witnesses for their meetings. An additional 13 songs have been added since its original publication.

== See also ==
- Jehovah's Witnesses practices
- Kingdom Hall
