= Creature worship =

Veneration of that which is created

In contrast with worship of a creator deity, the theological term creature worship is veneration of that which is created. In the biblical worldview, creature worship is seen as analogous to a reversal of the relationship between God and creature or the reversal of mindedness, which places power in the handiwork.

Creature worship may include: Animal worship, Animism, Cult of personality, Household deity, Idolatry, Nature worship, and/or Pantheism.

In some Christian denominations and even in the early development of the Christian church, the veneration of saints is considered creature worship. It is based on the view that Christians worship the deity of God instead of his humanity and that all creature worship, including the bowing and reverence for any creature such as the veneration of Mary and the saints are forbidden.

In Buddhism, Buddha was said to have forbidden his disciples from worshiping his images. To get around this, some Buddhists worship objects that serve as his symbols such as the pipal tree, images of Buddha's footsteps, and the wheel of law, among others.

Creature worship is part of the Hindu faith and this is based on the theory of karma and the principle of rebirth. With the goal to achieve nirvana, the soul experiences rebirth in the form of different creatures. It is, thus, accepted to worship nature in all of its elements because it signifies respect for the environment as well as the worship for one's ancestors.
