= Kingdom Hall =

Place of worship of Jehovah's Witnesses

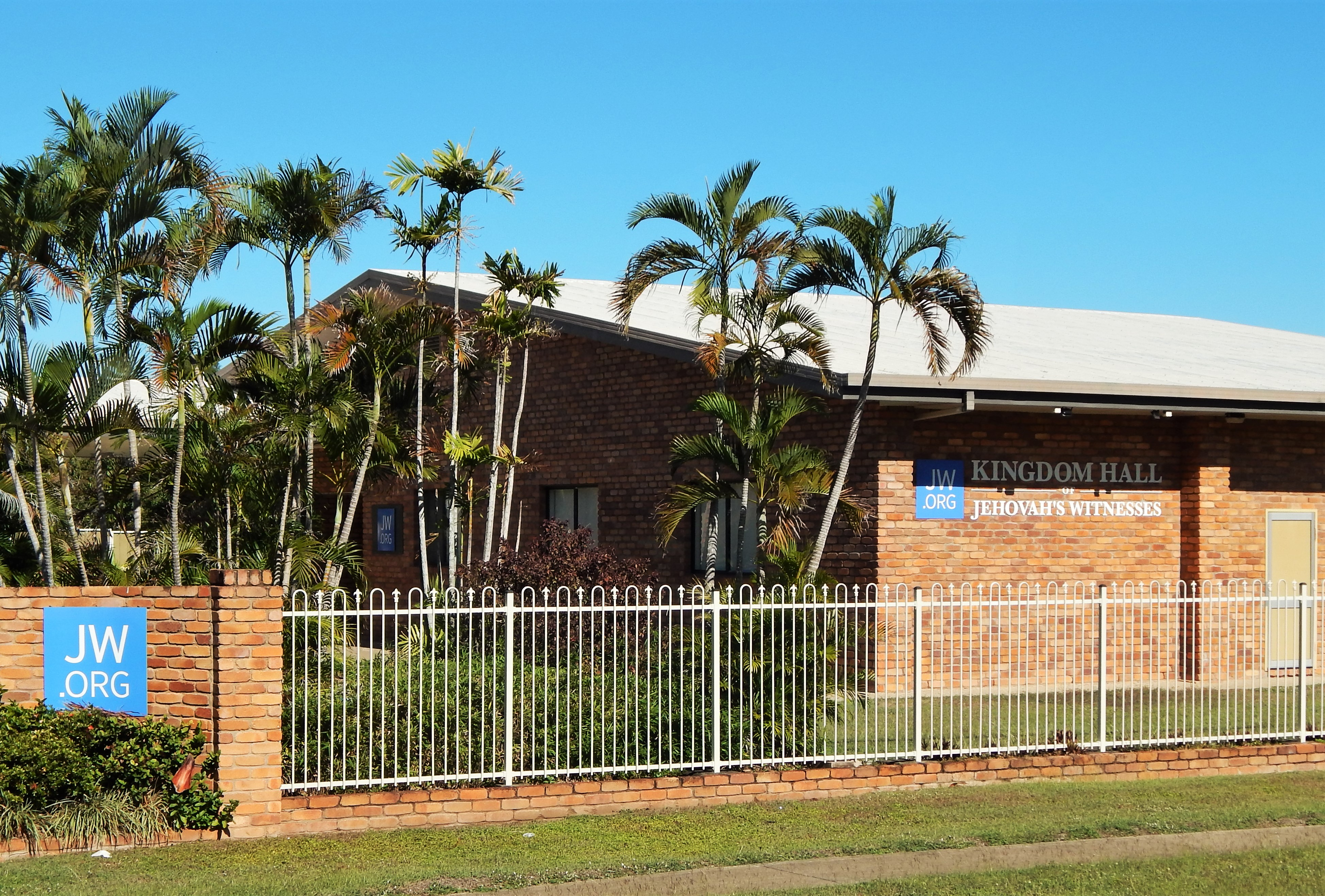
A Kingdom Hall in Rockhampton, Queensland, Australia

A Kingdom Hall is a place of worship used by Jehovah's Witnesses. The term was first suggested in 1935 by Joseph Franklin Rutherford, then president of the Watch Tower Society, for a building in Hawaii. Rutherford's reasoning was that these buildings would be used for "preaching the good news of the Kingdom".

Jehovah's Witnesses use Kingdom Halls for the majority of their worship and Bible instruction. Witnesses prefer the term "Kingdom Hall" over "church", noting that the term often translated "church" in the Bible refers to the congregation of people rather than a structure.

== Location and presentation ==
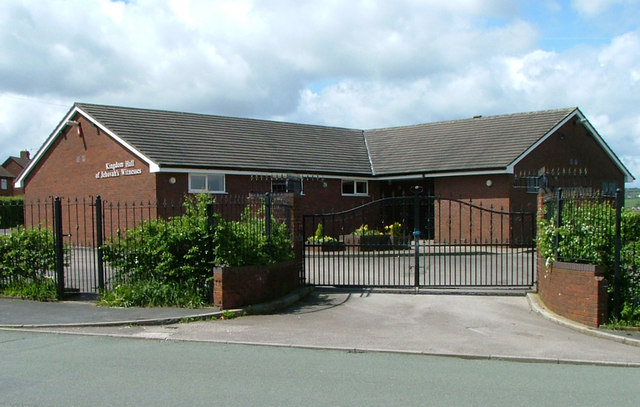
A Kingdom Hall in Biddulph, Stoke on Trent, United Kingdom

Kingdom Halls are typically modest, functional structures with practicality in mind. As Witnesses do not use religious symbols, such are not displayed on or in Kingdom Halls. An annual yeartext, or "theme scripture", which is the same for all congregations of Jehovah's Witnesses worldwide, is prominently displayed inside each Kingdom Hall. This text can be displayed in several languages if the Hall is used by foreign-language congregations. A Kingdom Hall typically has a library, contribution boxes, and a literature counter, where publications are displayed, stored and dispensed.

Some Kingdom Halls have multiple auditoriums to allow more than one congregation to conduct meetings simultaneously. Where there is more than one auditorium, each auditorium or the entire structure may be referred to as "a Kingdom Hall". Larger Assembly Halls or Convention Centers of Jehovah's Witnesses, or any rented arena or stadium used for larger gatherings of Jehovah's Witnesses are regarded 'as a large Kingdom Hall'. Undignified behavior is considered inappropriate during their religious events, even if the facility is an entertainment venue.

== Uses ==
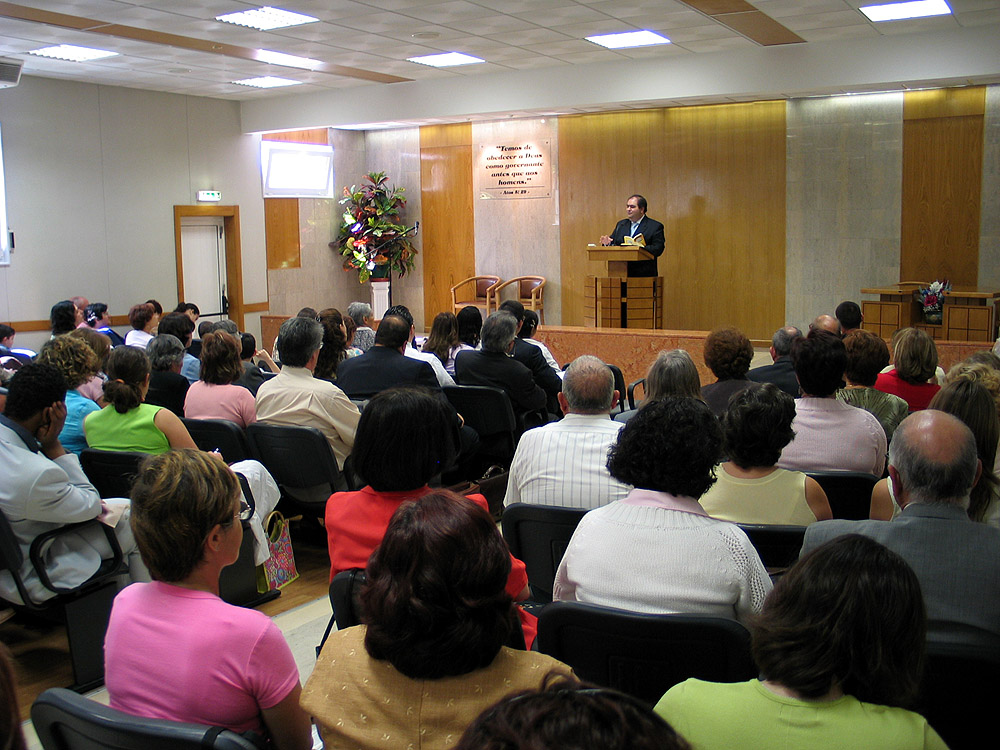
Worship at a Kingdom Hall in Portugal

=== Meetings for worship ===
Congregations typically meet in their Kingdom Halls two days each week for worship. Meetings usually open and close with song and prayer. Meetings held in the Kingdom Hall include Bible readings and public talks on matters such as the Bible, family life, Christian qualities and prophecy. There are discussions of specially prepared study articles in The Watchtower magazine and other publications of Jehovah's Witnesses. Witnesses usually meet in Kingdom Halls for preparation and prayer before engaging in their door-to-door ministry.

=== Classes ===
Kingdom Halls may also be used to teach sign language or other language classes. Kingdom Halls are also used for sessions especially developed for particular areas of service, such as the Pioneer Service School for full-time preachers, and the Kingdom Ministry School for elders and ministerial servants. In areas where the literacy rate is low, congregations may arrange to use Kingdom Halls to conduct literacy classes, which non-Witnesses may also attend.

=== Weddings ===
Kingdom Halls may be used for wedding ceremonies of Witness-baptized couples. A couple sends a request in writing to the congregation's "service committee", which assesses whether the couple is "in good standing, living in harmony with Bible principles and Jehovah’s righteous standards" and that they approve of the members of the couple's wedding party, the groomsmen and bridesmaids.

Jehovah's Witnesses attach no special significance to a Kingdom Hall wedding over a secular service. Witness couples may choose to be married elsewhere for personal or practical reasons. Kingdom Halls are not used for wedding receptions or other social events.

=== Funerals ===
Funeral services may be held in a Kingdom Hall if the body of elders considers that "the deceased had a clean reputation and was a member of the congregation or the minor child of a member". The family of the deceased may ask any respected male member of the congregation to conduct the service, which involves a simple Bible-based discourse. Depending on family preference and local custom, a Kingdom Hall funeral may or may not have the casketed deceased present.

=== Disaster relief ===
Disaster relief efforts of Jehovah's Witnesses are typically channeled through permanent local Disaster Relief Committees under the various branch offices, and are staged at Kingdom Halls and Assembly Halls as close as practical to the disaster area.

== Construction ==
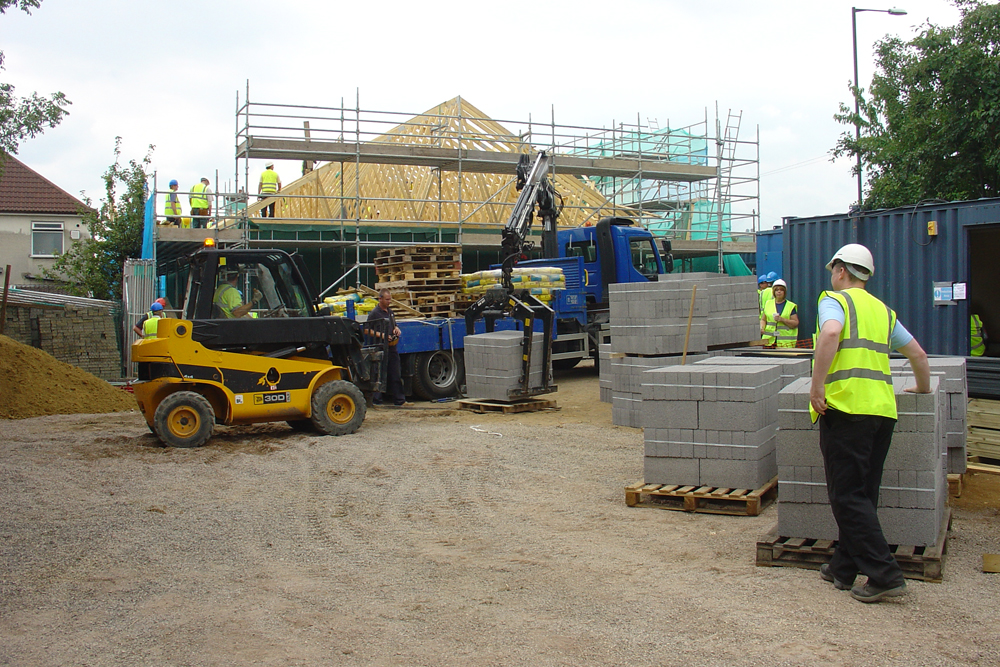
A Kingdom Hall under construction in Bishopsworth, Bristol, United Kingdom

The construction crews of Kingdom Halls and larger Assembly Halls consist of volunteering Jehovah's Witnesses, sometimes from other countries, who have been pre-approved for work on construction sites.

Witnesses in many countries use a number of standard designs for construction that can be built in just a few days. The act of constructing a Kingdom Hall in this manner after the initial foundations are laid is called a quick-build.

A Kingdom Hall or Assembly Hall may originate from the renovation of an existing structure, such as a theater or non-Witness house of worship. In areas of repeated or reputed vandalism, particularly in cities, some Kingdom Halls are built without windows to reduce the risk of property damage.

In 2015, it was announced to elders in the United States that new Kingdom Halls worldwide would use standardized designs and materials, suited to local circumstances.

=== Regional Building Committees ===
Jehovah's Witnesses' branch offices formerly appointed local Regional Building Committees (RBC) to oversee the construction and maintenance of their places of worship. Such committees - which usually consisted of five to seven persons, often with experience in construction trades - aimed to coordinate the efforts of those involved so as to provide attractive and functional facilities that are financially viable.

RBCs cooperated with local congregations of Jehovah's Witnesses seeking to build or renovate a place of worship, under the direction of the local branch office. Committees helped in assessing the suitability of a possible construction-site, purchasing the land and materials and coordinating the efforts of volunteers from the wider area. Members of a Regional Building Committee worked voluntarily and received no remuneration for their work.

On Saturday, January 31, 2015, in a special meeting with all elders in the United States via live video-feed, it was announced that Regional Building Committees would be replaced by Local Design/Construction Department of the branch office, but with a more defined organizational structure.

=== Funding ===
In 1983, an arrangement was instituted whereby loans from the Watch Tower Society financed Kingdom Halls. In addition to contribution boxes for local congregation expenses and "the worldwide work", each congregation had a contribution box specifically for voluntary donations toward Kingdom-Hall construction. The Watch Tower Society pooled these donations into the Society Kingdom Hall Fund for financing the construction of Kingdom Halls worldwide, particularly in developing nations.

When a congregation received local approval to build a new Kingdom Hall, that congregation could apply for a loan from the Society Kingdom Hall Fund. The congregation repaid the loan to the Watch Tower Society, in addition to its continued contributions to the Kingdom Hall Fund. Interest was charged on the loans until September 2008.

The way Kingdom Halls are funded changed significantly in 2014. The provision of Kingdom Hall loans from the Society ceased, as did the separate Society Kingdom Hall Fund. Instead, all congregations were directed to contribute an ongoing amount to the branch office each month, in addition to donations for other purposes, into a single World Wide Work fund, and the branch office finances new Kingdom Halls. The stated purpose was so that funding from more affluent areas could supplement funding from areas without the resources for a new hall. The monthly amount was initially based on "a confidential survey of all publishers" indicating how much they could commit each month, with a recommendation that the amount be "at least the same amount as the current monthly loan repayment". As of 2020, the amount is "based on a monthly per-publisher amount suggested by the branch office" and reviewed by local congregation elders.

== Maintenance ==
Routine maintenance of Kingdom Halls is performed by the members of the congregations that use them, typically according to a scheduled checklist. The "Kingdom Hall operating committee" oversees maintenance of the building. At least one elder or ministerial servant from each congregation is selected to be part of the operating committee. Kingdom Hall maintenance costs are covered by donations to a local fund.

== Gallery ==
Kingdom Halls at various locations

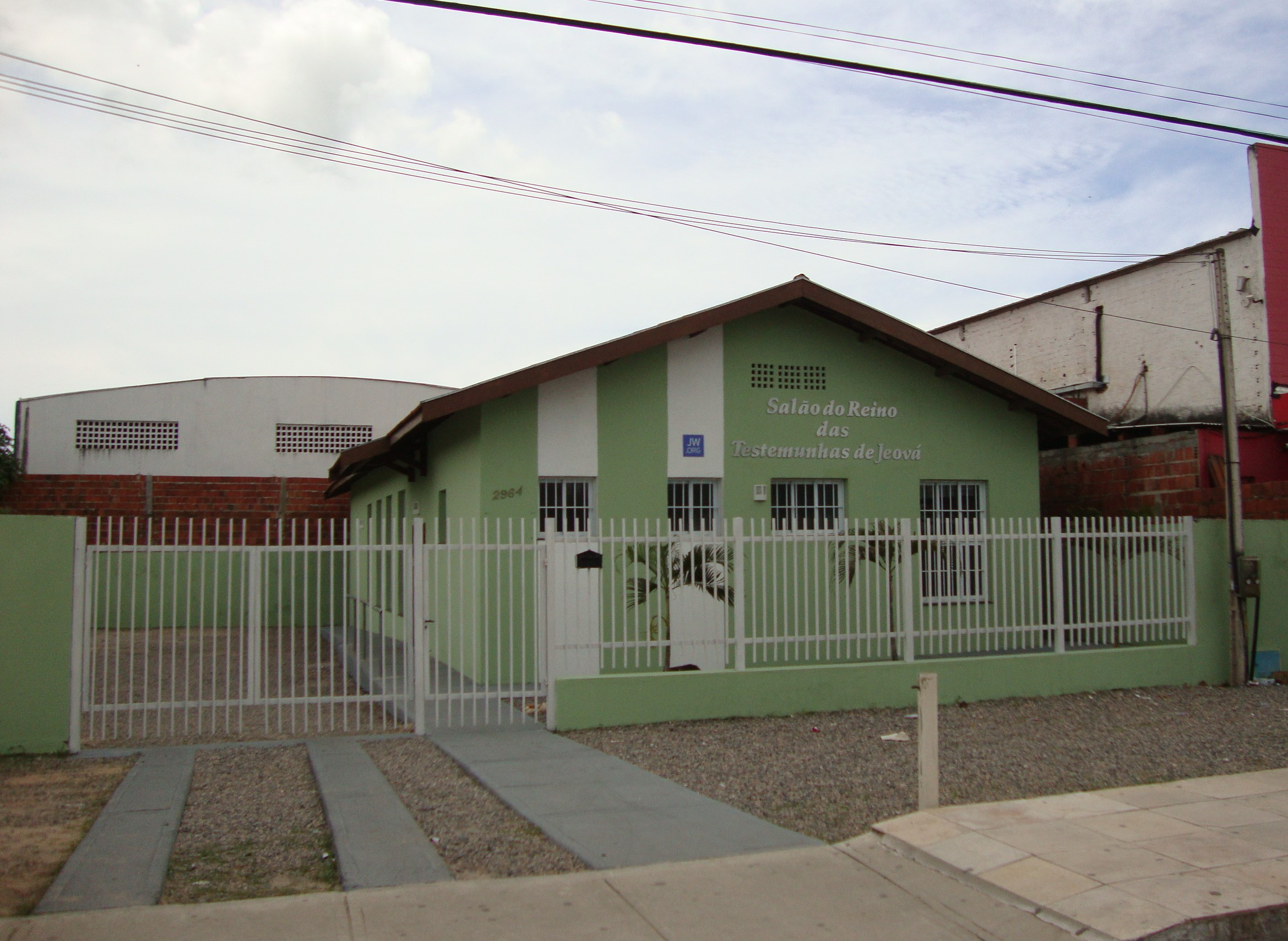
Cascavel, Brazil

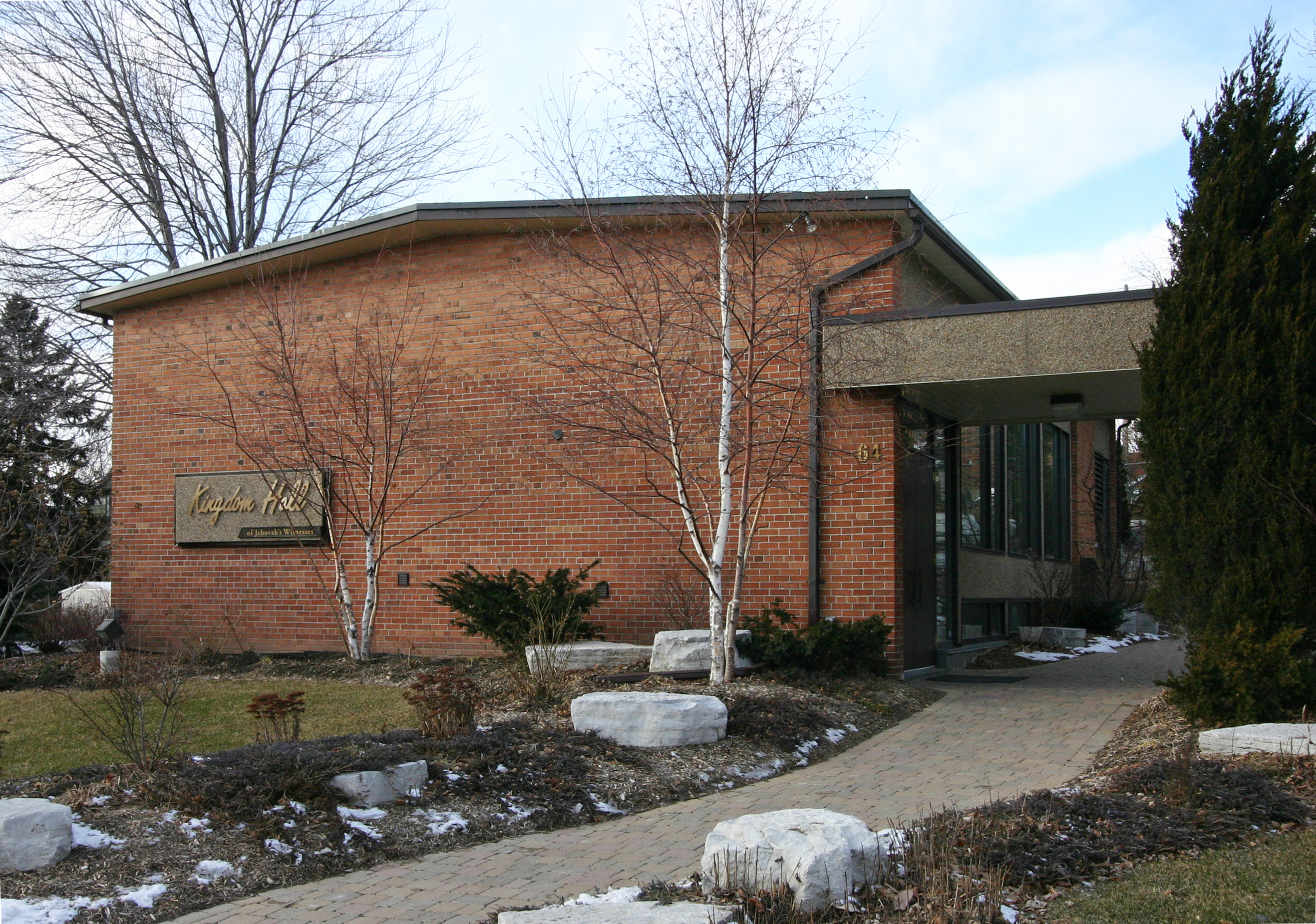
Toronto, Canada

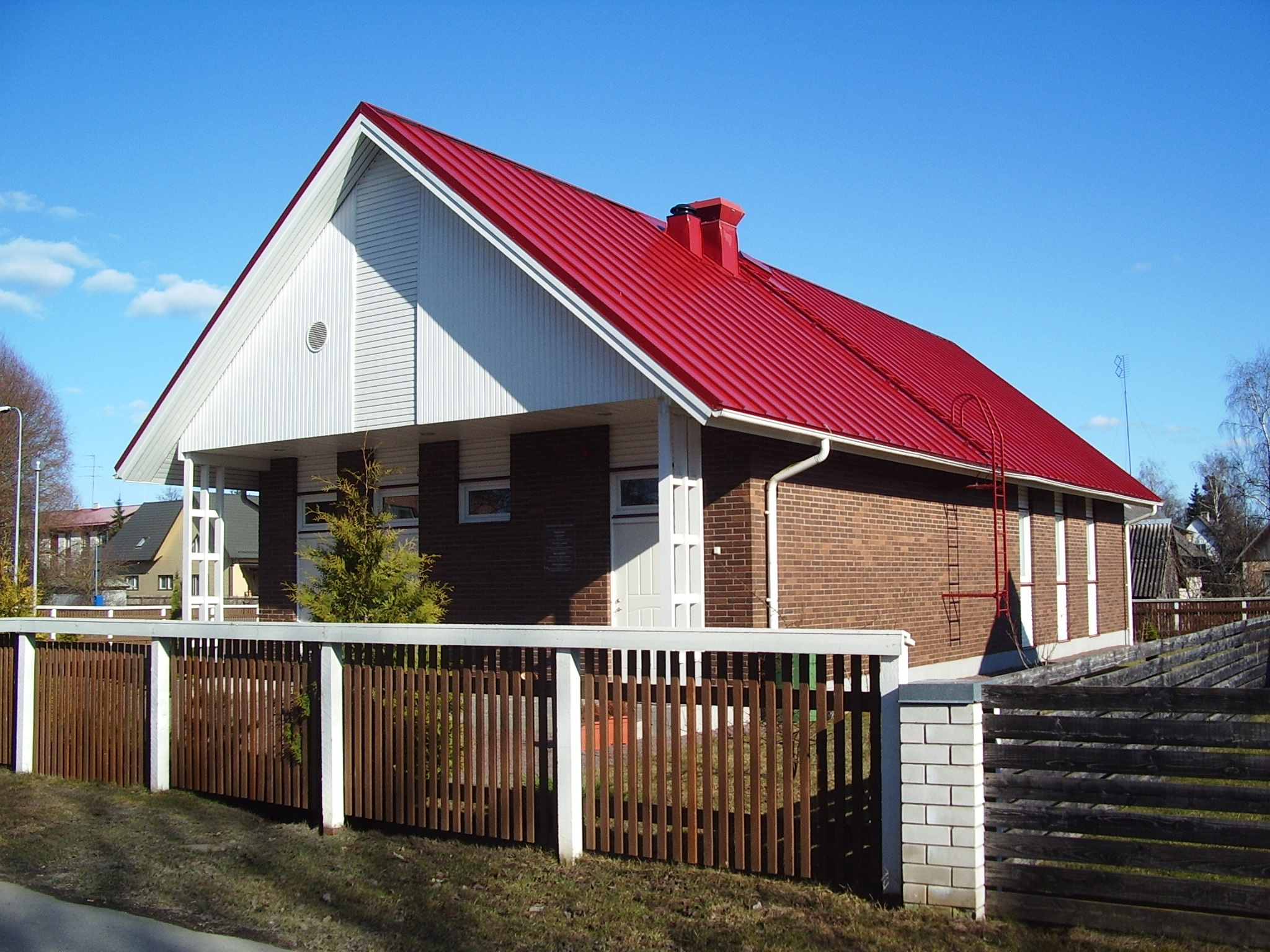
Rapla, Estonia

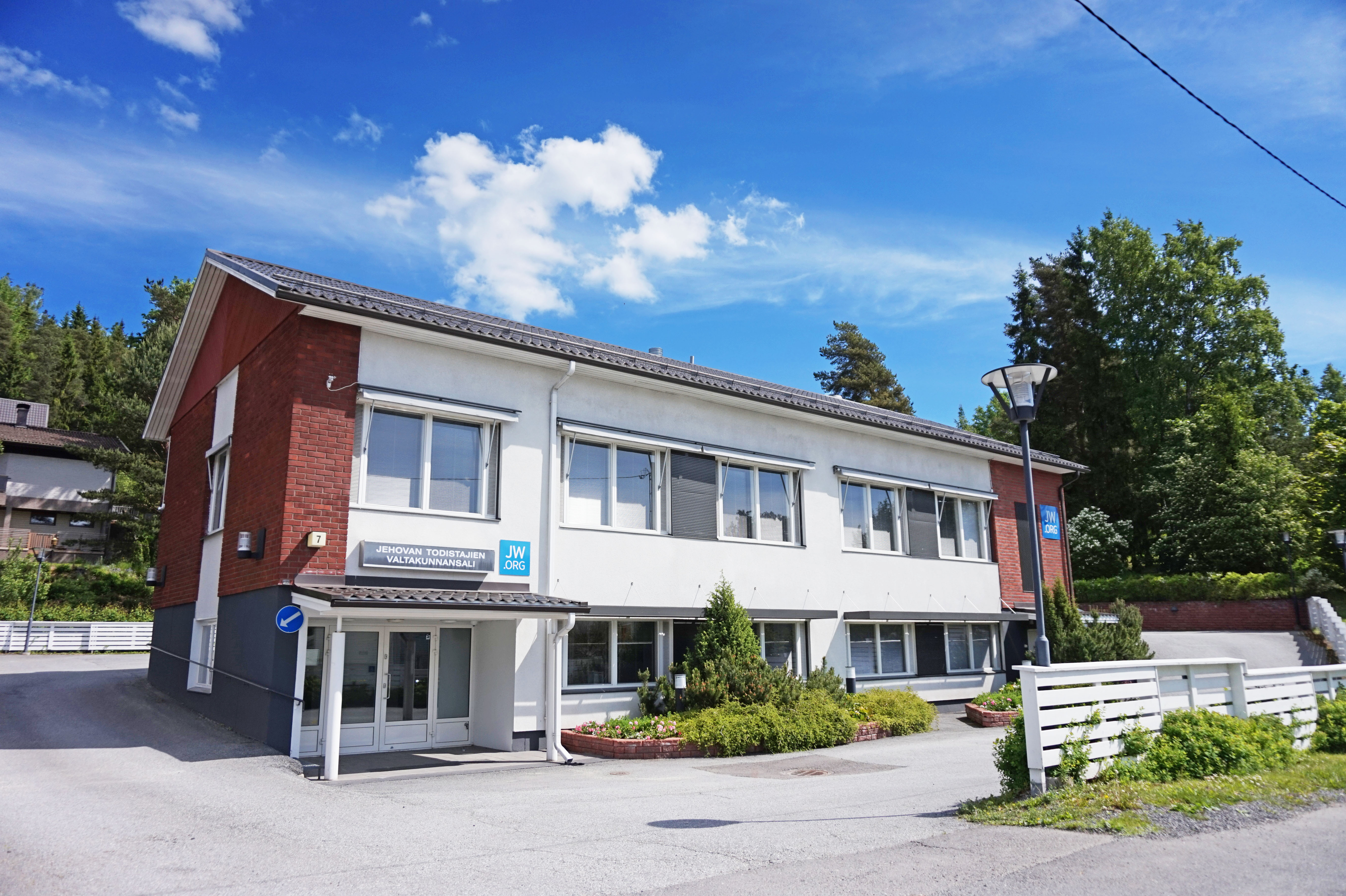
Tampere, Finland

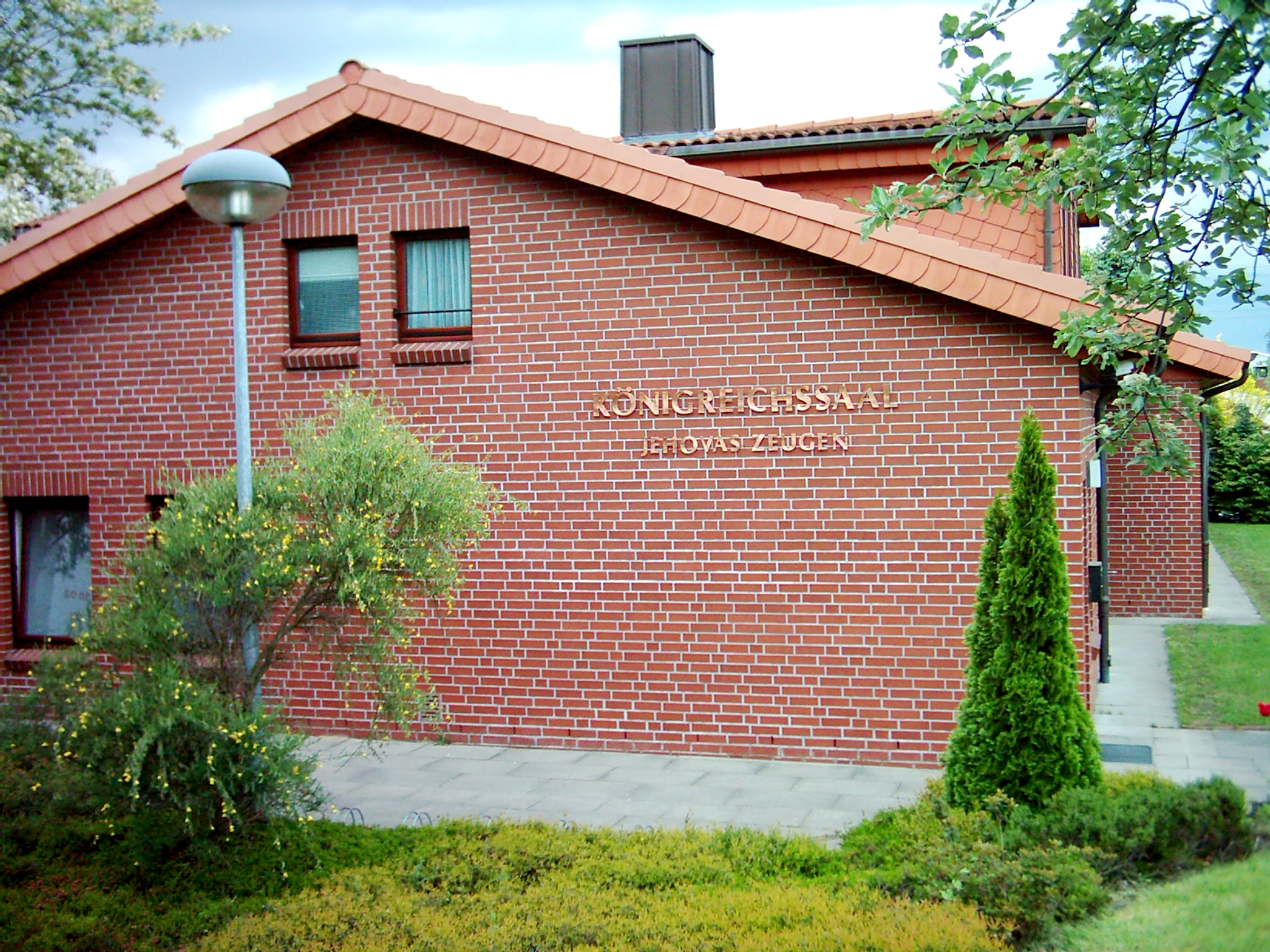
Hamburg, Germany

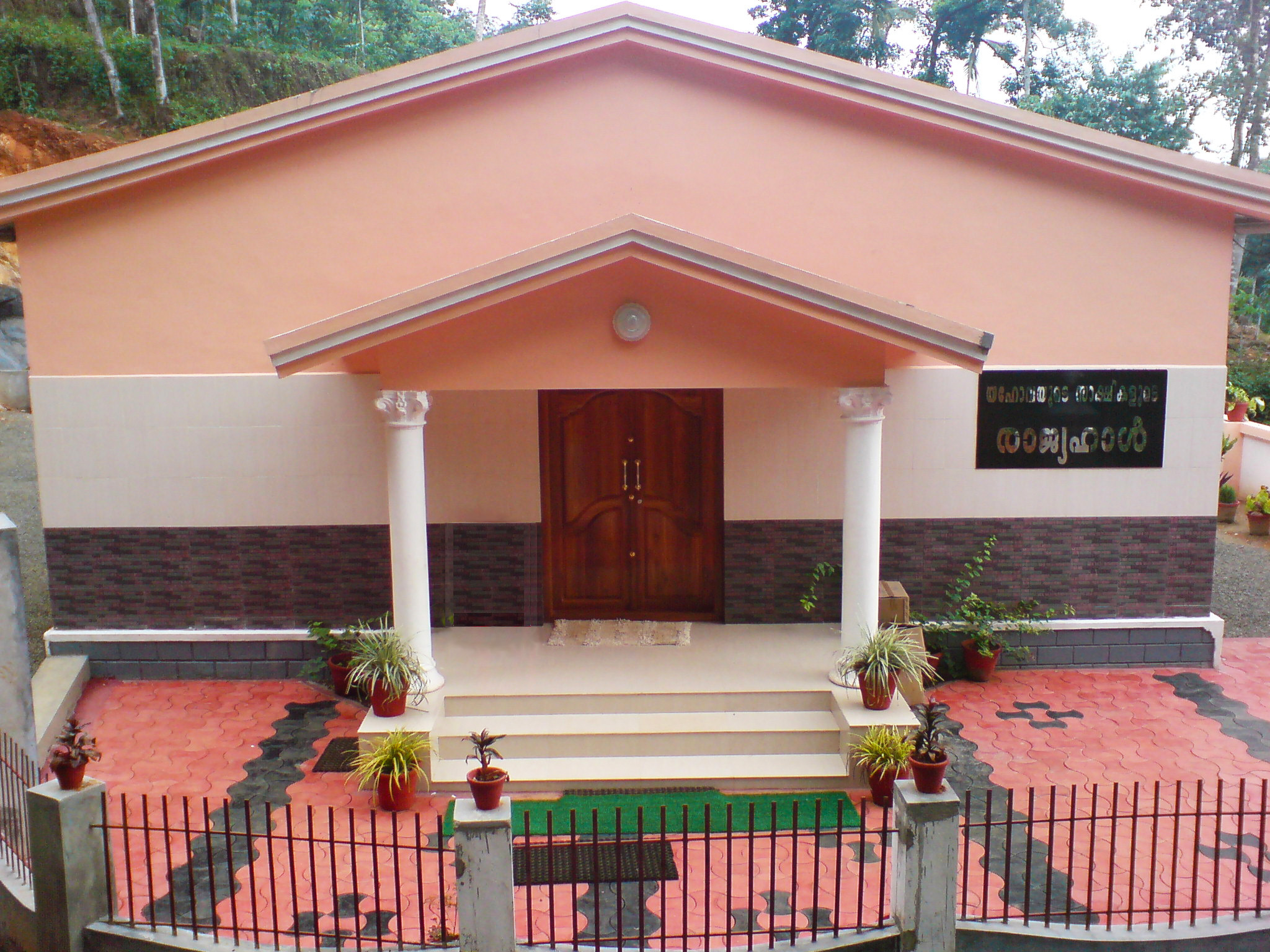
Kerala, India

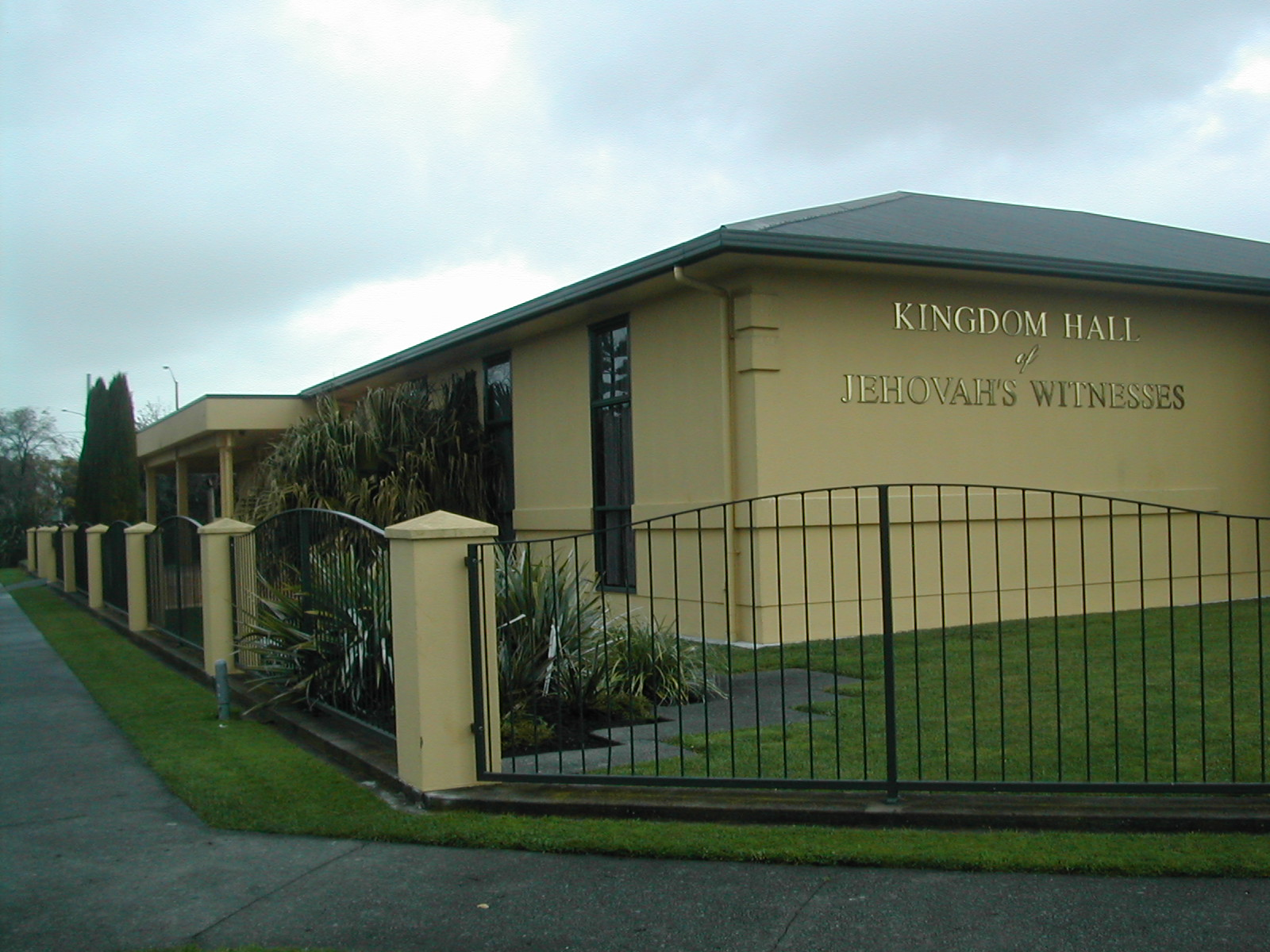
Napier, New Zealand

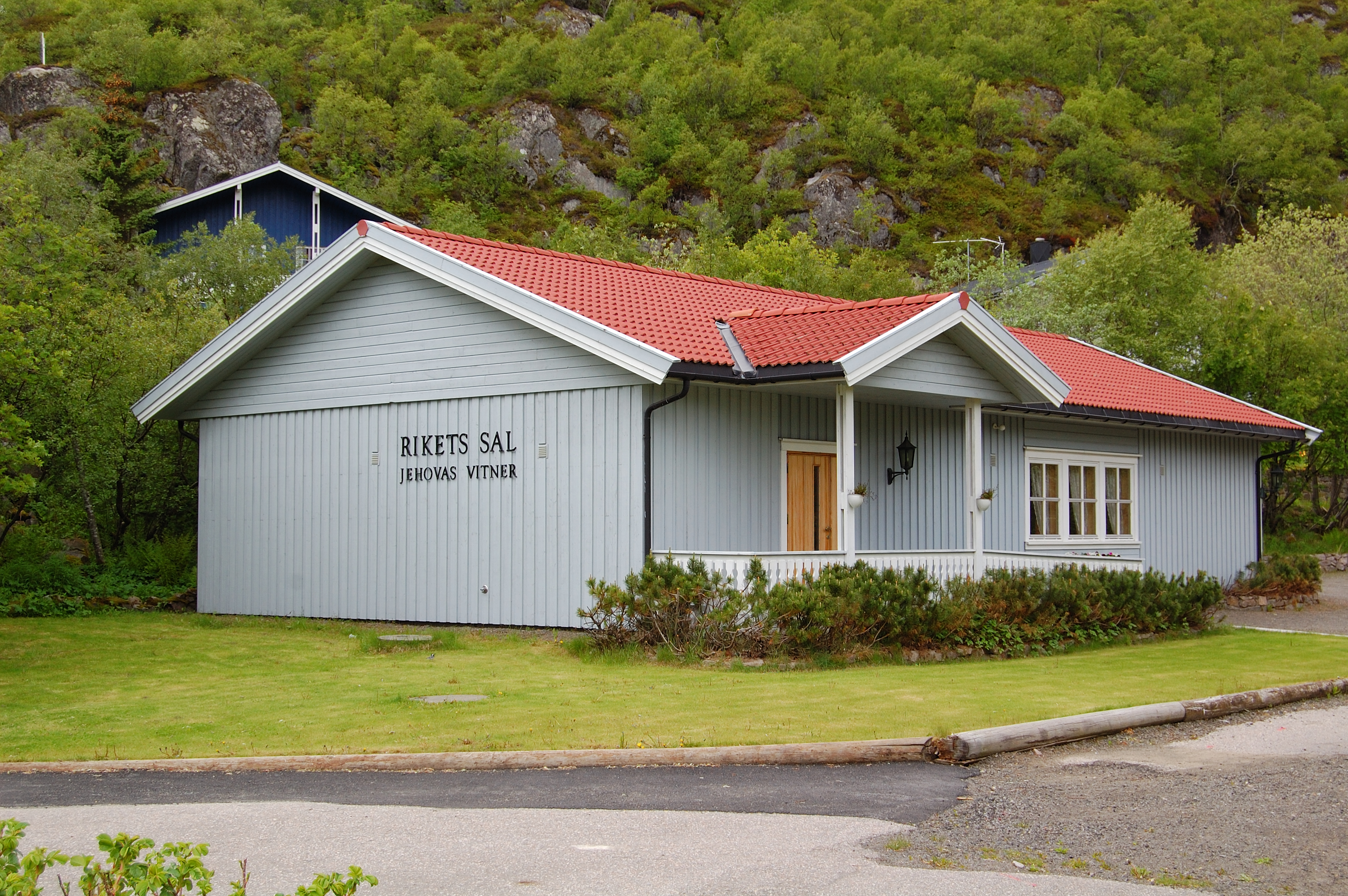
Lofoten, Norway

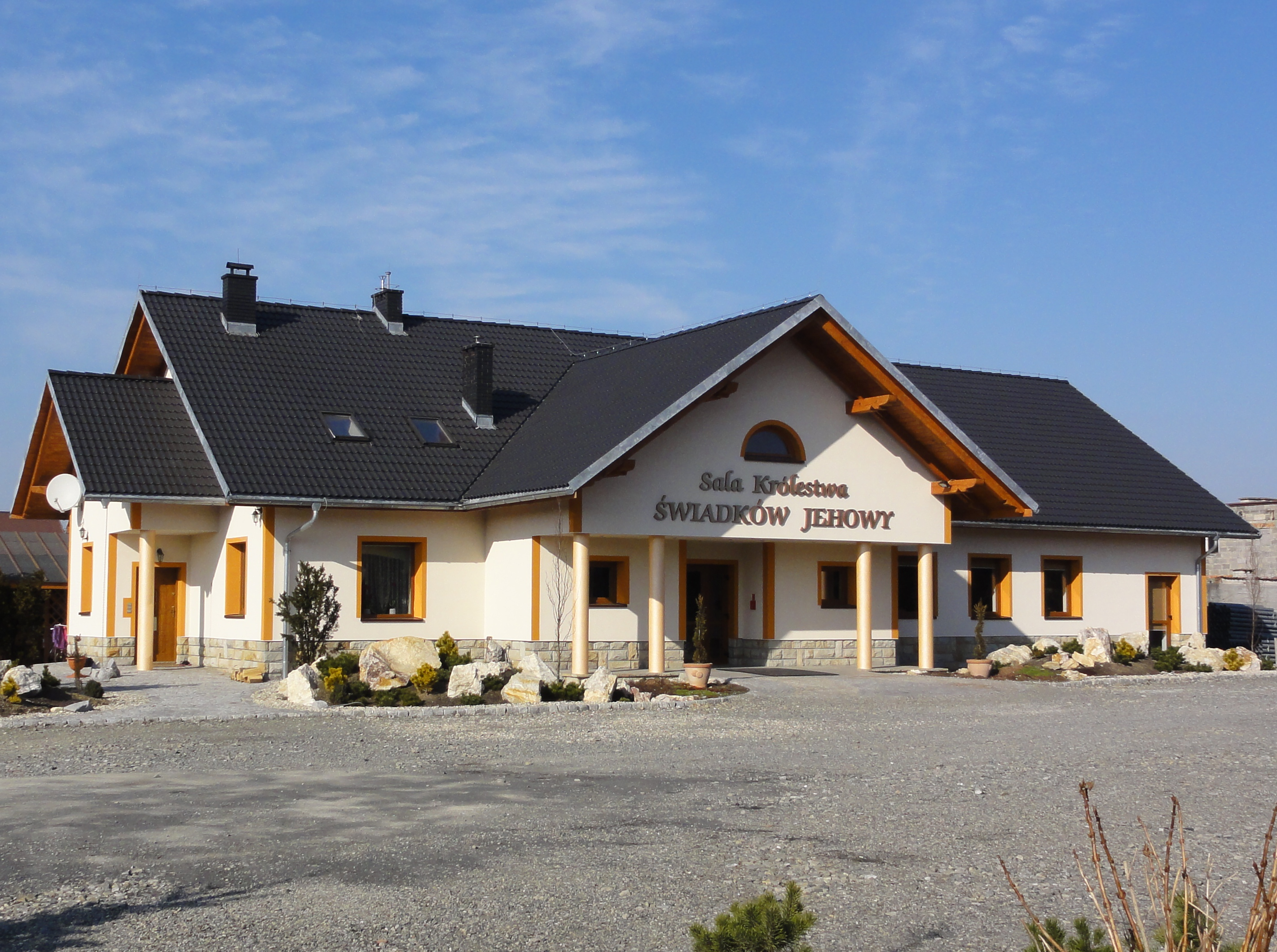
Harbutowice, Poland

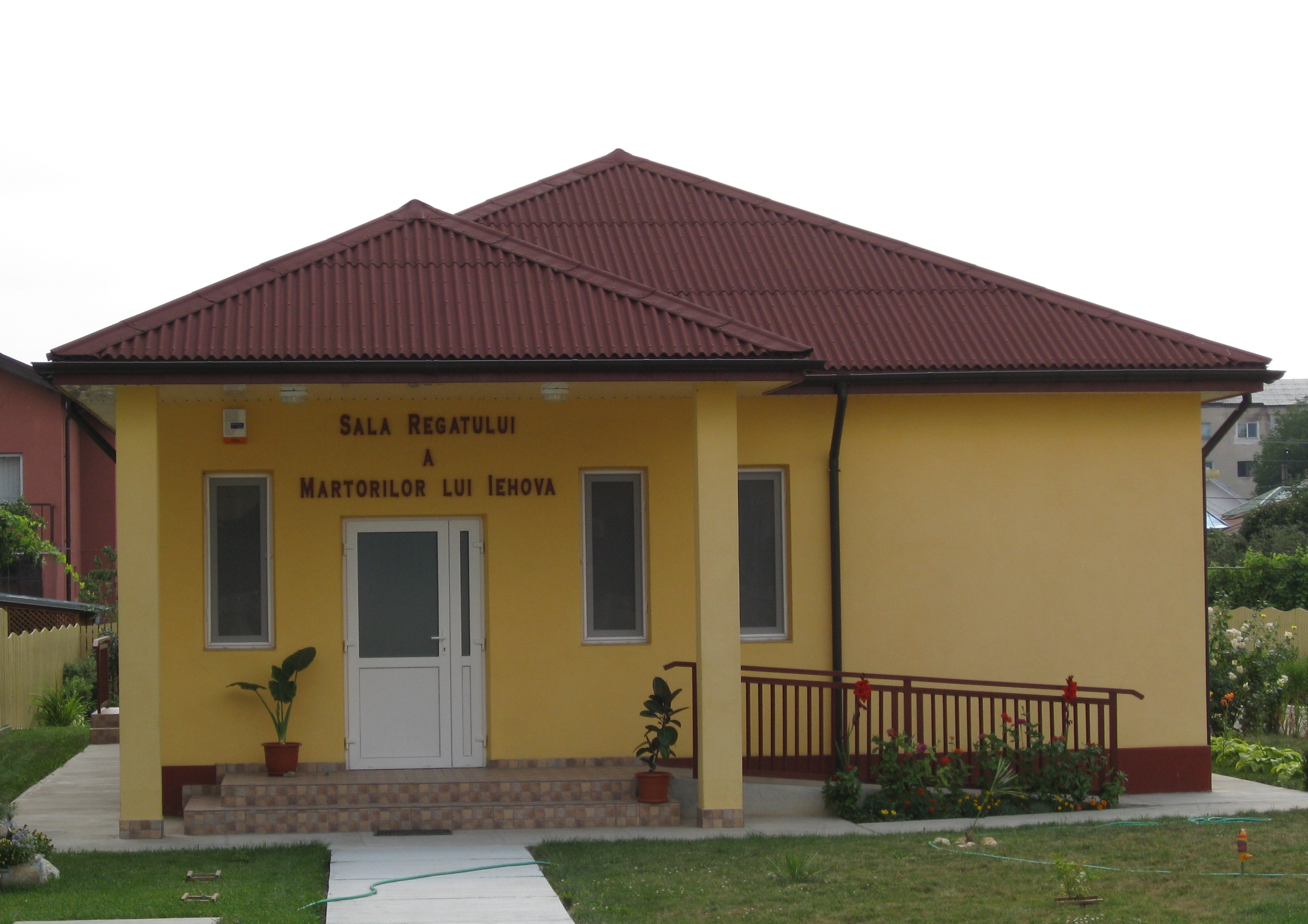
Târgovişte, Romania

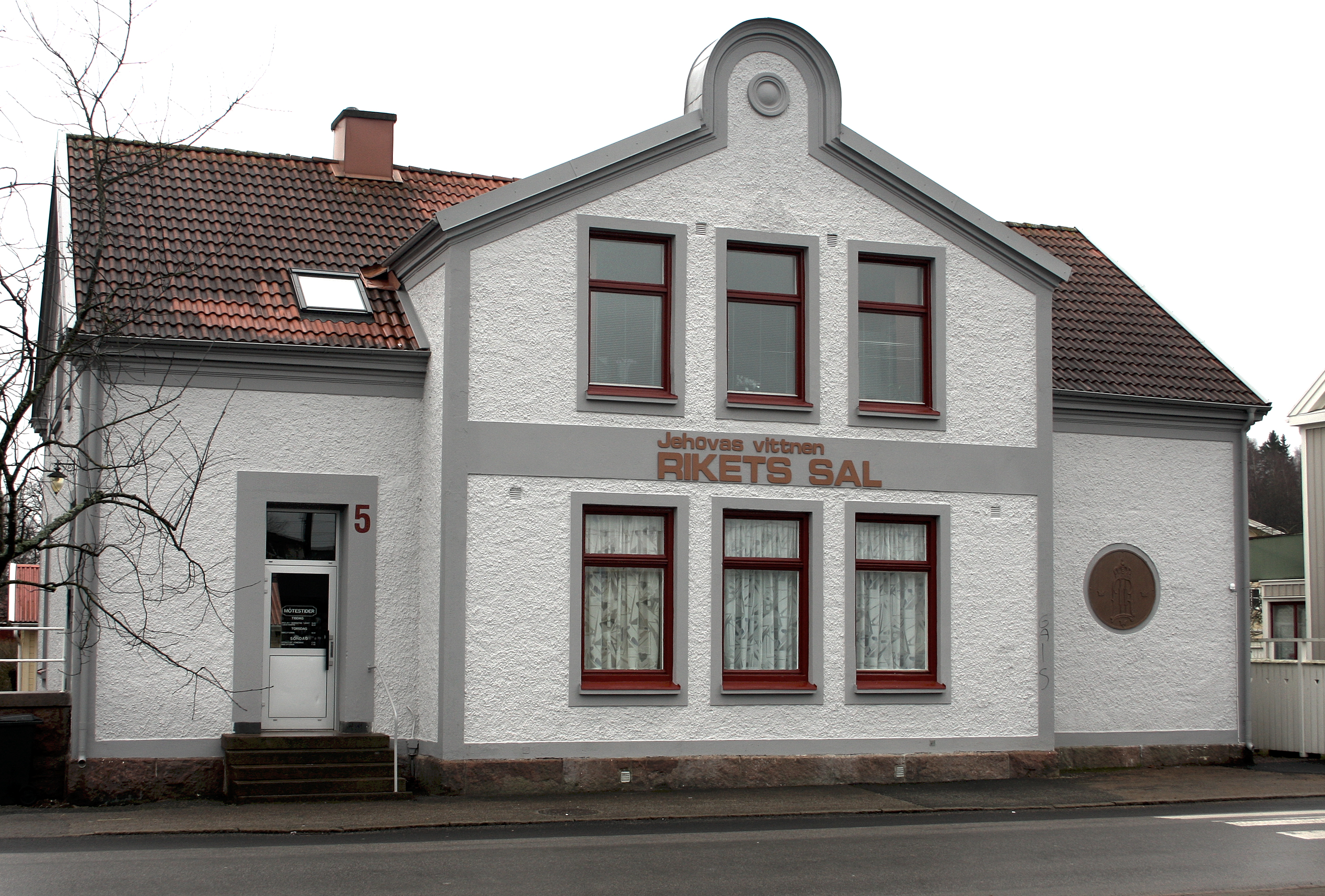
Vårgårda, Sweden

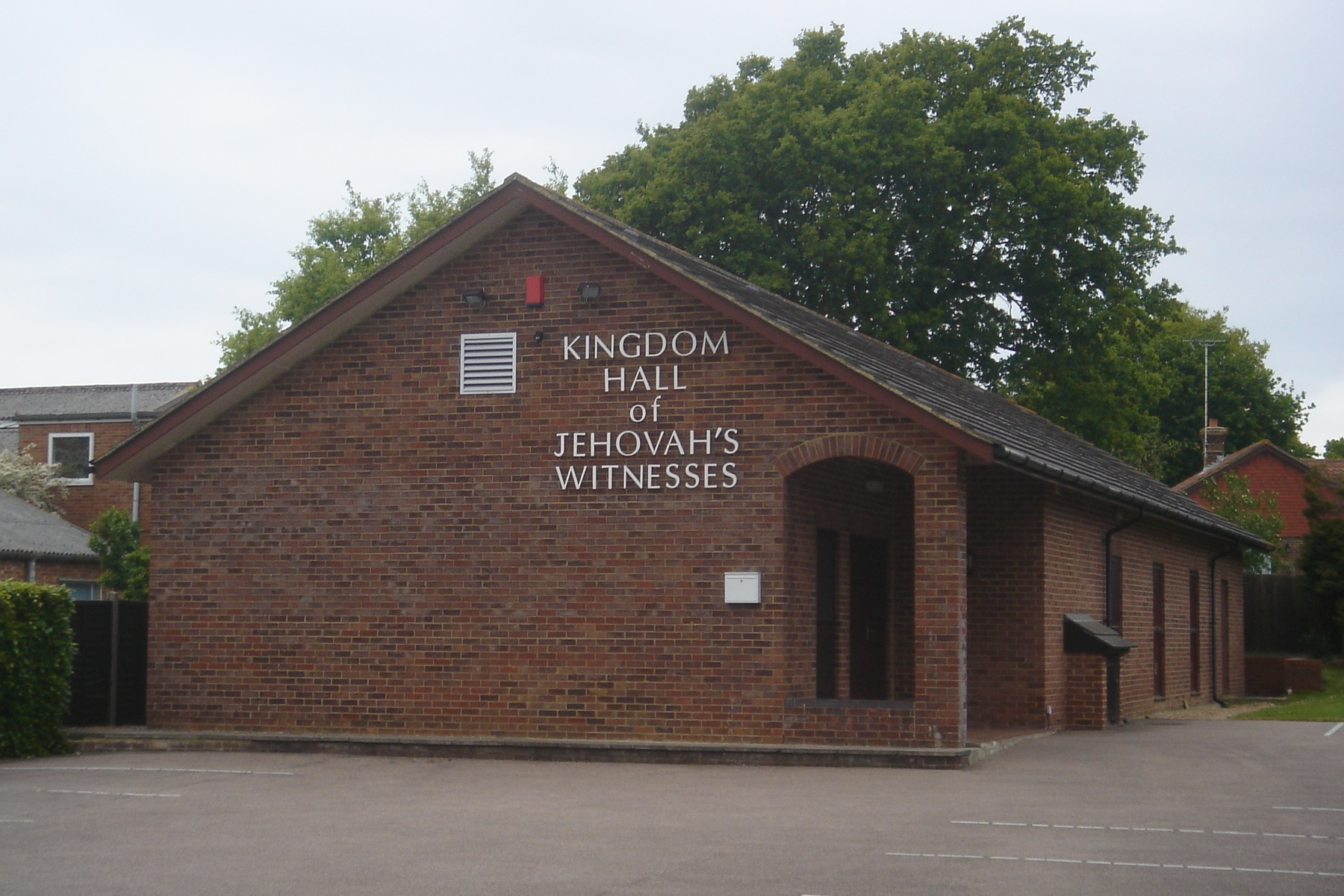
West Sussex, United Kingdom

== Sources ==
- Chryssides, George D. (2022). Jehovah's Witnesses: A New Introduction. Bloomsbury Academic. ISBN 978-1-3501-9089-4.
