= Christian pacifism =

Theological and ethical position

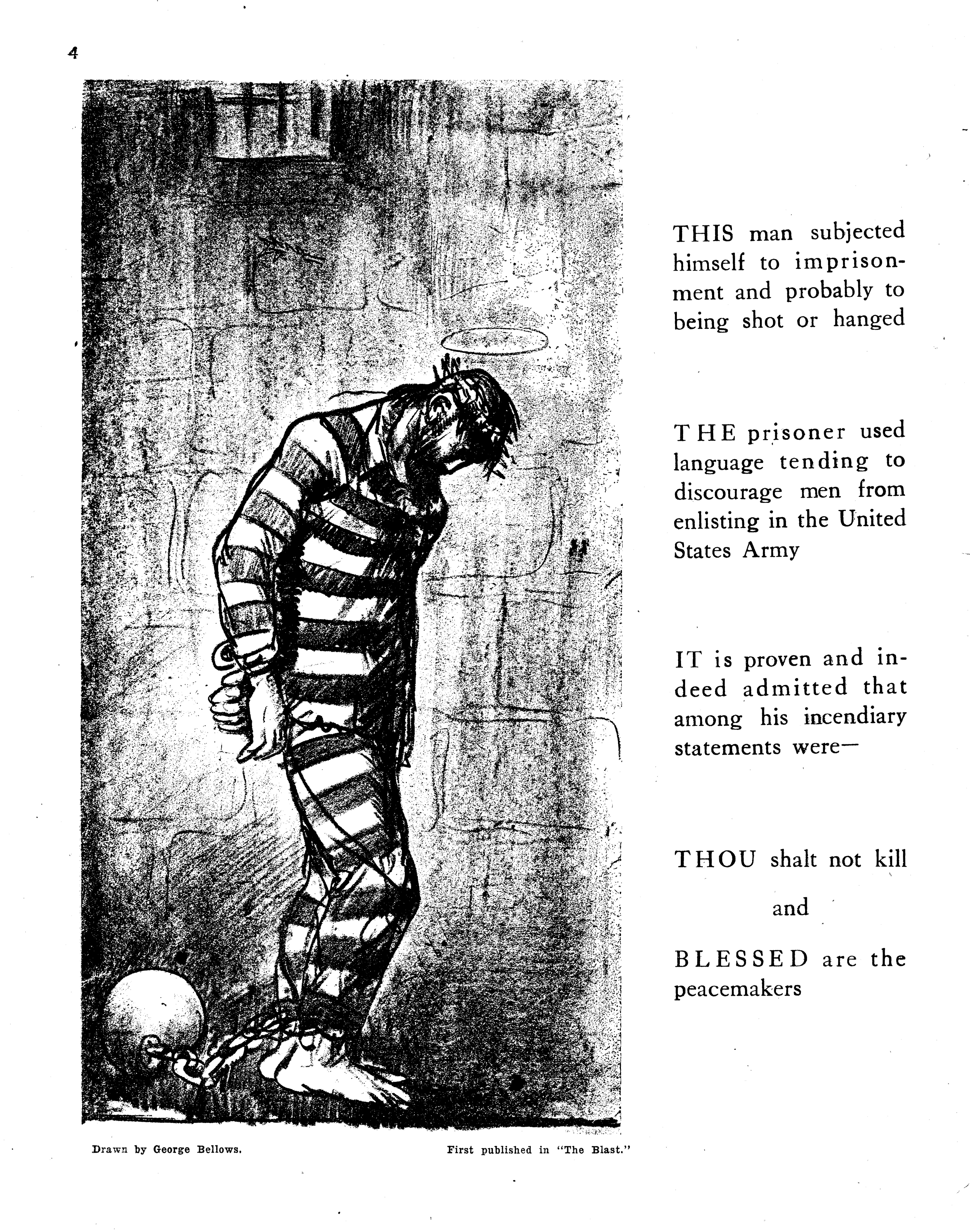
Blessed are the Peacemakers (1917) by George Bellows

Christian pacifism is the theological and the ethical position according to which pacifism and non-violence have a scriptural and a rational basis for Christians, and it is based on the affirmation that any form of violence is incompatible with the Christian faith. Christian pacifists state that Jesus himself was a pacifist who taught and practiced pacifism and that his followers must do likewise. Notable Christian pacifists include Martin Luther King Jr., Leo Tolstoy, Adin Ballou, Dorothy Day, Ammon Hennacy, and brothers Daniel and Philip Berrigan.

Christian anarchists, such as Ballou and Hennacy, believe that adherence to Christianity requires not just pacifism but, because governments inevitably threatened or used force to resolve conflicts, anarchism. Most Christian pacifists, including the peace churches, Christian Peacemaker Teams, and individuals like John Howard Yoder, make no claim to be anarchists.

== Origins ==
=== Old Testament ===
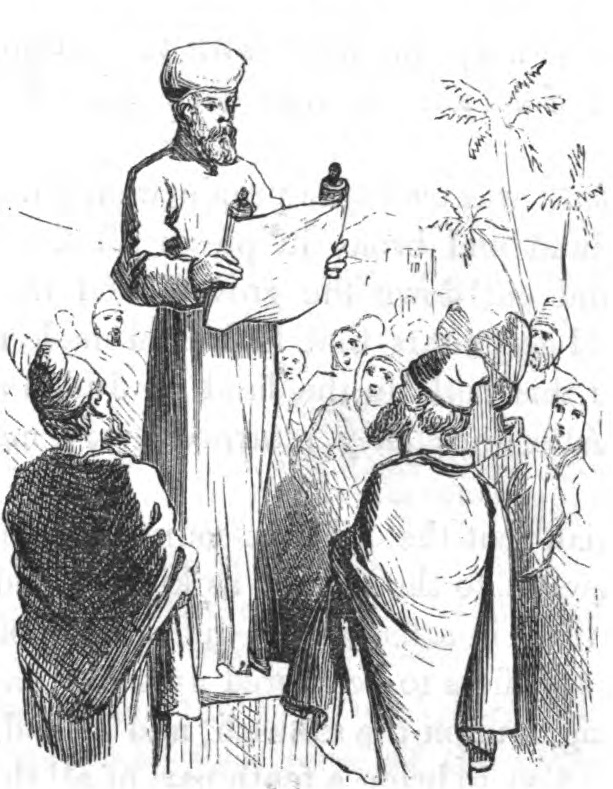
A Levite reading the Law to the Israelites. The Rambam famously rules that members of the tribe of Levi do not fight in the army.

Roots of Christian pacifism can be found in the scriptures of the Old Testament according to Baylor University professor of religion, John A. Wood. Millard C. Lind explains the theology of warfare in ancient Israel as God directing the people of Israel to trust in him, not in the warring way of the nations, and to seek peace, not coercive power. Stephen B. Chapman expresses the Old Testament describes God's divine intervention, not human power politics, or the warring king, as key to the preservation of Israel. Lind asserts the Old Testament reflects that God occasionally sanctions, even commands wars to the point of God actually fighting utilizing the forces of nature, miraculous acts or other nations. Lind further argues God fights so that Israel does not have to fight wars like other nations because God delivers them. God promised to fight for Israel, to be an enemy to their enemies and oppose all that oppose them (Exodus 23:22). Pacifist God, John Howard Yoder explains, sustained and directed his community not by power politics but by the creative power of God's word, of speaking through the law and the prophets. The scriptures in the Old Testament provide background of God's great victory over evil, sin and death. Stephen Vantassel contends the Old Testament exists to put the issue of war and killing in historical and situational context.

The role of war is developed and changes throughout the Old Testament. Chapman asserts God used war to conquer and provide the Promised Land to Israel, and then to defend that land. The Old Testament explains that Israel does not have to fight wars like other nations because God delivers them. Starting with the Exodus out of Egypt, God fights for Israel as a warrior rescuing his people from the oppressive Egyptians (Exodus 15:3). In Exodus 14:13, Moses instructs the Israelites, "The Lord will fight for you; you need only to be still." The miraculous parting of the Red Sea is God being a warrior for Israel through acts of nature and not human armies. God's promise to fight on behalf of his chosen people is affirmed in the scriptures of the Old Testament (Deuteronomy 1:30).

According to Old Testament scholar Peter C. Craige, during the military conquests of the Promised Land, the Israelites fought in real wars against real human enemies; however, it was God who granted them victory in their battles. Craige further contends God determined the outcome of human events with his participation through those humans and their activity; essentially, that God fought through the fighting of his people. Once the Promised Land was secured, and the nation of Israel progressed, God used war to protect or punish the nation of Israel with his sovereign control of the nations to achieve his purposes (2 Kings 18:9–12, Jeremiah 25:8–9, Habakkuk 1:5–11). Yoder affirms as long as Israel trusted and followed God, God would work his power through Israel to drive occupants from lands God willed them to occupy (Exodus 23:27–33). The future of Israel was dependent solely on its faith and obedience to God as mediated through the Law and prophets, and not on military strength.

Jacob Enz explains God made a covenant with his people of Israel, placing conditions on them that they were to worship only him, and be obedient to the laws of life in the Ten Commandments. When Israel trusted and obeyed God, the nation prospered; when they rebelled, God spoke through prophets such as Ezekiel and Isaiah, telling Israel that God would wage war against Israel to punish her (Isaiah 59:15–19). War was used in God's ultimate purpose of restoring peace and harmony for the whole earth with the intention towards salvation of all the nations with the coming of the Messiah and a new covenant. Jacob Enz describes God's plan was to use the nation of Israel for a higher purpose, and that purpose was to be the mediator between all the peoples and God. The Old Testament reflects how God helped his people of Israel, even after Israel's repeated lapses of faith, demonstrating God's grace, not violence.

The Old Testament explains God is the only giver of life and God is sovereign over human life. Man's role is to be a steward who should take care of all of God's creation, and that includes protecting human life. Craige explains God's self-revelation through his participating in human history is referred to as "Salvation History." The main objective of God's participation is man's salvation. God participates in human history by acting through people and in the world that is both in need of salvation, and is thus imperfect. God participates in the human activity of war through sinful human beings for his purpose of bringing salvation to the world.

Studies conducted by scholars Friedrich Schwally, Johannes Pedersen, Patrick D. Miller, Rudolf Smend and Gerhard von Rad maintain the wars of Israel in the Old Testament were by God's divine command. This divine activity took place in a world of sinful men and activities, such as war. God's participation through evil human activity such as war was for the sole purposes of both redemption and judgment. God's presence in these Old Testament wars does not justify or deem them holy, and instead is interpreted as serving to provide hope in a situation of hopelessness. The sixth commandment, "Thou shalt not kill" (Exodus 20:13) and the fundamental principle it holds true is that reverence for human life must be given the highest importance. The Old Testament points to a time when weapons of war shall be transformed into the instruments of peace, and the hope for the consummation of the Kingdom of God when there will be no more war. Wood points to the scriptures of Isaiah and Micah (Isaiah 2:2–4; 9:5; 11:1–9; and Micah 4:1–7) that express the pacifist view of God's plan to bring peace without violence.

=== Ministry of Jesus ===
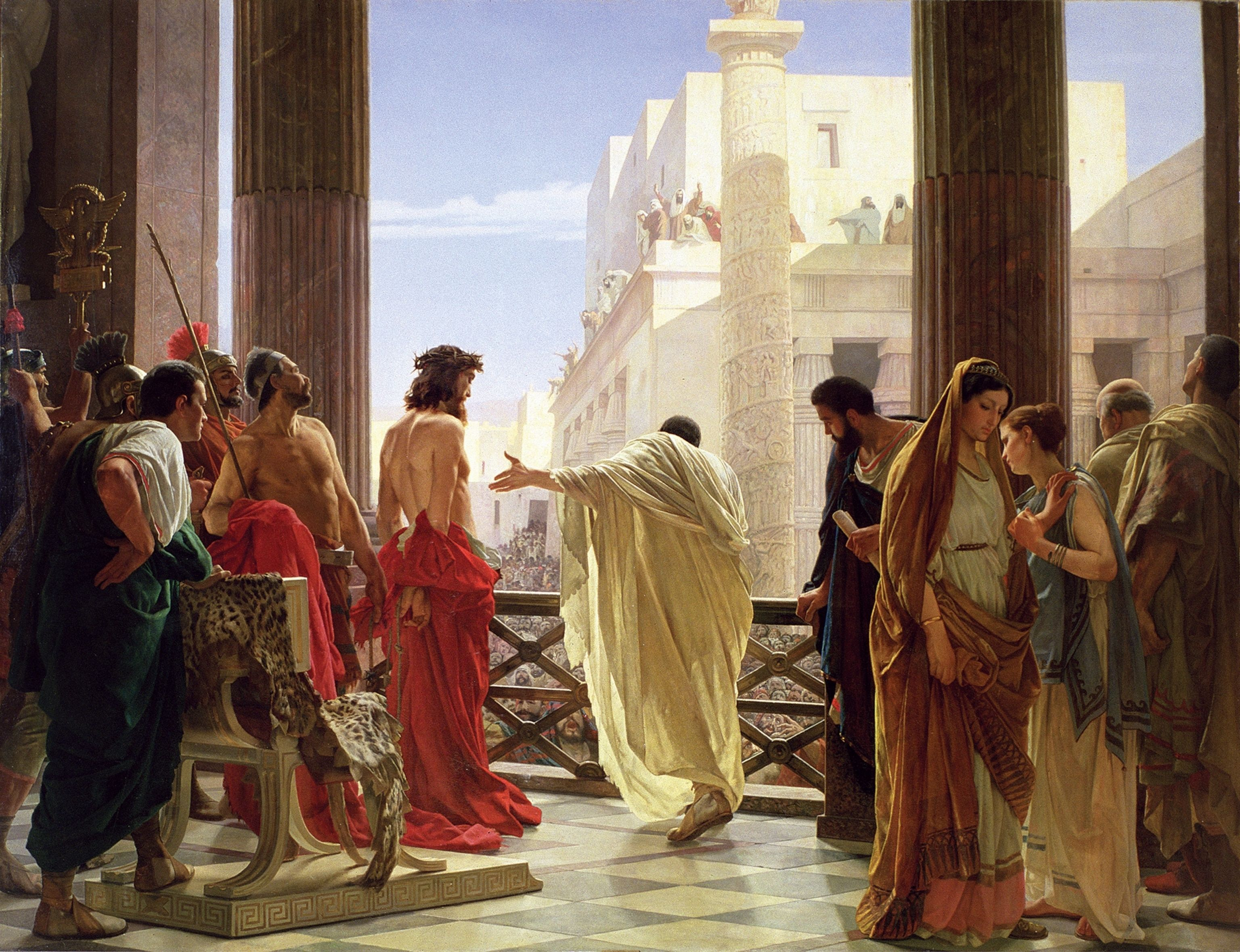
Ecce Homo (c. 1880) by Antonio Ciseri

Jesus appeared to teach pacifism during his ministry when he told his disciples:

You have heard that it was said, 'An eye for an eye, and a tooth for a tooth.' But I tell you, do not resist an evil person. If someone strikes you on the right cheek, turn to him the other also.

— Matthew 5:38–39

Love your enemies, do good to those who hate you, bless those who curse you, pray for those who mistreat you.

— Matthew 5:43–48, Luke 6:27–28

Put your sword back in its place… for all who draw the sword will die by the sword.

— Matthew 26:52

Blessed are the peacemakers, for they shall be called sons of God.

— Matthew 5:9

=== Early Church ===
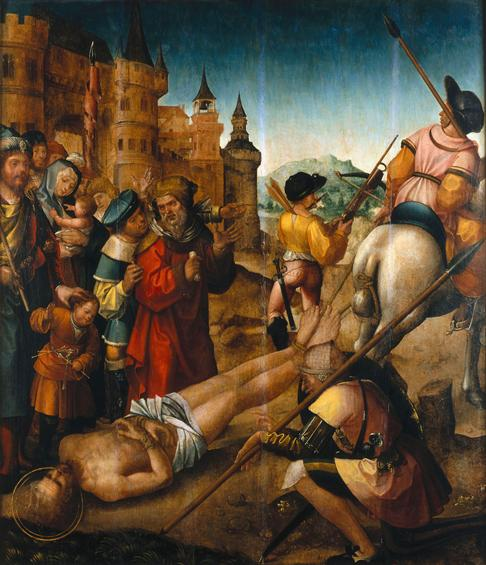
Martírio de Santo Hipólito (Martyrdom of Saint Hippolytus) by Cristóvão de Figueiredo

Several Church Fathers interpreted Jesus' teachings as advocating nonviolence. For example, Justin Martyr writes, "we who formerly used to murder one another do not only now refrain from making war upon our enemies, but also, that we may not lie nor deceive our examiners, willingly die confessing Christ," and, "we who were filled with war, and mutual slaughter, and every wickedness, have each through the whole earth changed our warlike weapons,—our swords into ploughshares, and our spears into implements of tillage,—and we cultivate piety...". Tatian writes that, "I am not anxious to be rich; I decline military command [...] Die to the world, repudiating the madness that is in it"; and Aristides writes that "Through love towards their oppressors, they persuade them to become Christians." Hippolytus of Rome went so far as to deny soldiers baptism: "A soldier of the civil authority must be taught not to kill men and to refuse to do so if he is commanded, and to refuse to take an oath. If he is unwilling to comply, he must be rejected for baptism." Tertullian formed an early argument against statolatry, "There is no agreement between the divine and the human sacrament, the standard of Christ and the standard of the devil, the camp of light and the camp of darkness. One soul cannot be due to two masters—God and Cæsar," also writing, "the People warred: if it pleases you to sport with the subject. But how will a Christian man war, nay, how will he serve even in peace, without a sword, which the Lord has taken away?" Origen, whose father Leonidus was martyred during the persecution of the Roman emperor Septimius Severus in the year AD 202, writes, "Jews [...] were permitted to take up arms in defence of the members of their families, and to slay their enemies, the Christian Lawgiver [has] altogether forbidden the putting of men to death [...] He nowhere teaches that it is right for His own disciples to offer violence to any one, however wicked." Further examples include Arnobius, "evil ought not to be requited with evil, that it is better to suffer wrong than to inflict it, that we should rather shed our own blood than stain our hands and our conscience with that of another, an ungrateful world is now for a long period enjoying a benefit from Christ"; Archelaus, "many [soldiers] were added to the faith of our Lord Jesus Christ and threw off the belt of military service"; Cyprian of Carthage, "The whole world is wet with mutual blood; and murder, which in the case of an individual is admitted to be a crime, is called a virtue when it is committed wholesale"; and Lactantius, "For when God forbids us to kill, He not only prohibits us from open violence, which is not even allowed by the public laws, but He warns us against the commission of those things which are esteemed lawful among men. Thus it will be neither lawful for a just man to engage in warfare"; while Gregory of Nyssa conveys the spirit of anarchism, "How can a man be master of another's life, if he is not even master of his own? Hence he ought to be poor in spirit, and look at Him who for our sake became poor of His own will; let him consider that we are all equal by nature, and not exalt himself impertinently against his own race."

Saint Maximilian of Tebessa was executed by the order of the proconsul Dion for his refusal to serve in the Roman army as he thought killing was evil; he became recognized as a Christian martyr. However, many early Christians also served in the army, with multiple military saints before the time of Constantine, and the presence of large numbers of Christians in his army may have been a factor in the conversion of Constantine to Christianity. Marcus Aurelius allegedly reported to the Roman Senate that his Christian soldiers fought with prayers instead of conventional weapons, which resulted in the Rain Miracle of the Marcomannic Wars.

=== Conversion of the Roman Empire ===
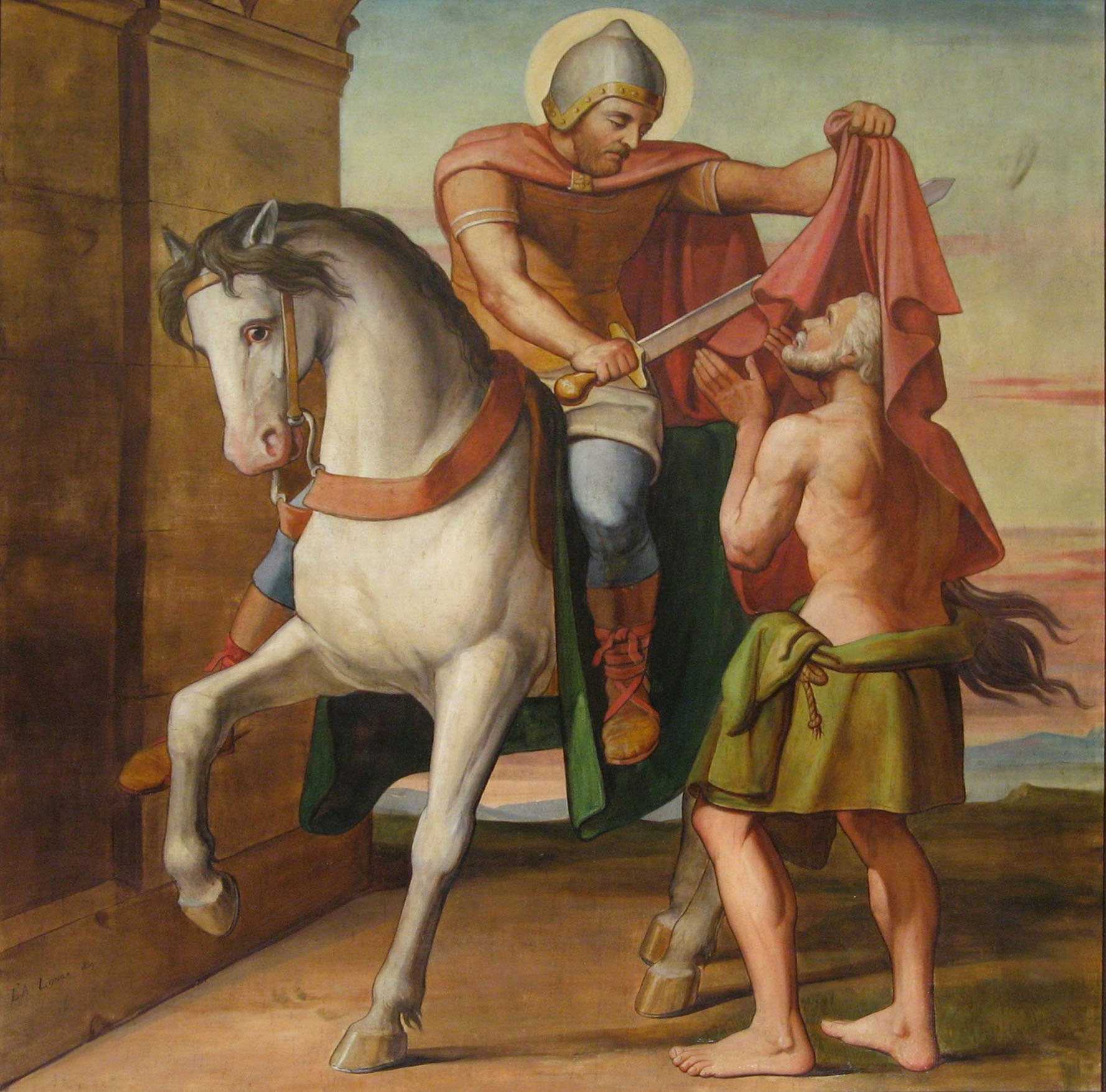
La Charité de Saint-Martin (The Charity of Saint Martin) by Louis-Anselme Longa

After the Roman Emperor Constantine converted in AD 312 and began to conquer "in Christ's name", Christianity became entangled with the state, and warfare and violence were increasingly justified by influential Christians. For example, St. Augustine of Hippo advocated for state persecution of Donatists, while, according to Athanasius, "it is not right to kill, yet in war it is lawful and praiseworthy to destroy the enemy; accordingly not only are they who have distinguished themselves in the field held worthy of great honours, but monuments are put up proclaiming their achievements." Some scholars believe that "the accession of Constantine terminated the pacifist period in church history." Nevertheless, the tradition of Christian pacifism was carried on by a few dedicated Christians throughout the ages, such as Martin of Tours, who converted during the early days of Christianity in Europe. Martin, who was then a young soldier, declared in AD 336, "I am a soldier of Christ. I cannot fight." He was jailed for this action, but later released, eventually becoming just the third Bishop of Tours. Jerome also writes, "To die is the lot of all, to commit homicide only of the weak man."

=== Middle Ages ===
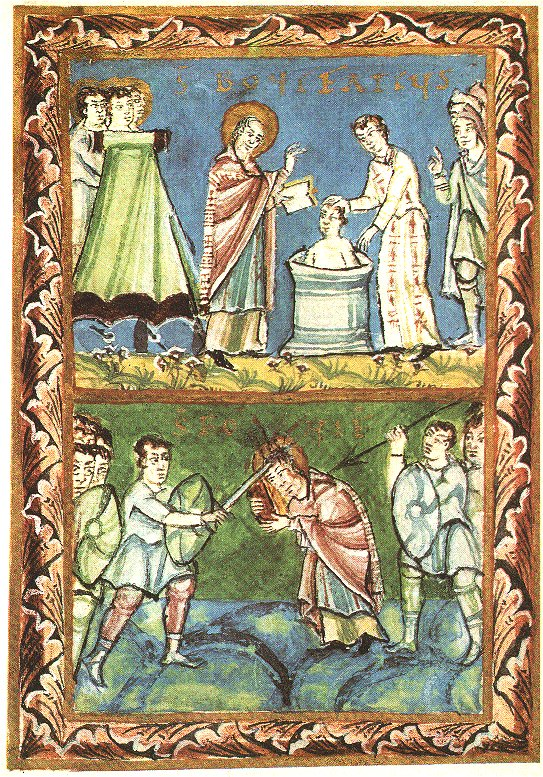
Fulda Sacramentary, Saint Boniface baptizing (top) and being martyred (bottom)

According to the Bonifacian hagiography, Boniface, in 754, set out with a retinue for Frisia, with the hope of converting the Frisians. He baptized a great number and summoned a general meeting for confirmation at a place not far from Dokkum, between Franeker and Groningen. Instead of his converts, however, a group of armed robbers appeared who slew the aged archbishop. The hagiography mention that Boniface persuaded his (armed) comrades to lay down their arms: "Cease fighting. Lay down your arms, for we are told in scripture not to render evil for evil but to overcome evil by good."

Having killed Boniface and his company, the Frisian bandits ransacked their possessions but found that the company's luggage did not contain the riches they had hoped for: "they broke open the chests containing the books and found, to their dismay, that they held manuscripts instead of gold vessels, pages of sacred texts instead of silver plates."

The Peace and Truce of God was a movement in the Middle Ages led by the Catholic Church and the first mass peace movement in history. The goal of both the Pax Dei and the Treuga Dei was to limit the violence of feuding endemic to the western half of the former Carolingian Empire – following its collapse in the middle of the 9th century – using the threat of spiritual sanctions. The eastern half of the former Carolingian Empire did not experience the same collapse of central authority, and neither did England.

The Peace of God was first proclaimed in 989, at the Council of Charroux held at Charroux, Vienne. It sought to protect ecclesiastical property, agricultural resources and unarmed clerics. The Truce of God, first proclaimed in 1027 at the Council of Toulouges, attempted to limit the days of the week and times of year that the nobility engaged in violence.

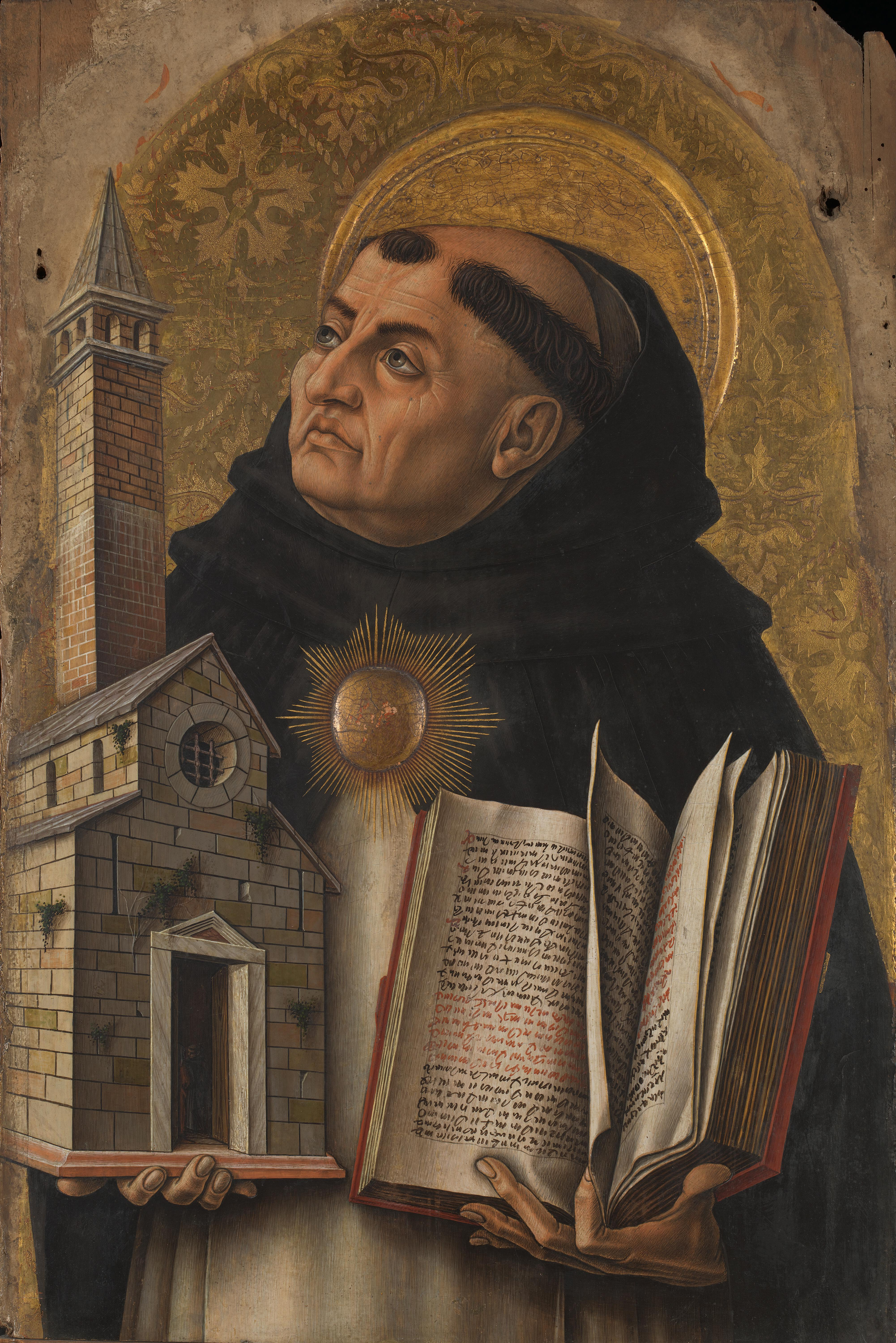
An altarpiece of Thomas Aquinas in Ascoli Piceno, Italy, by Carlo Crivelli (15th century)

By the 13th century, Thomas Aquinas was bold enough to declare, concerning animals, "I answer that [...] it is lawful to kill dumb animals, in so far as they are naturally directed to man's use, as the imperfect is directed to the perfect."

After becoming disillusioned with his own military service in the army of Walter III, Count of Brienne, Saint Francis of Assisi advanced an even more inclusive vision of Christian pacifism in his denunciation of the warfare which accompanied the Fifth Crusade. In addition to reminding his followers that "Your God is of your flesh, He lives in your nearest neighbor, in every man", Francis outlined a pacifistic vision in the Canticle of the Sun which calls for a universal reverence of all living creatures in the natural world.

=== Cathars ===
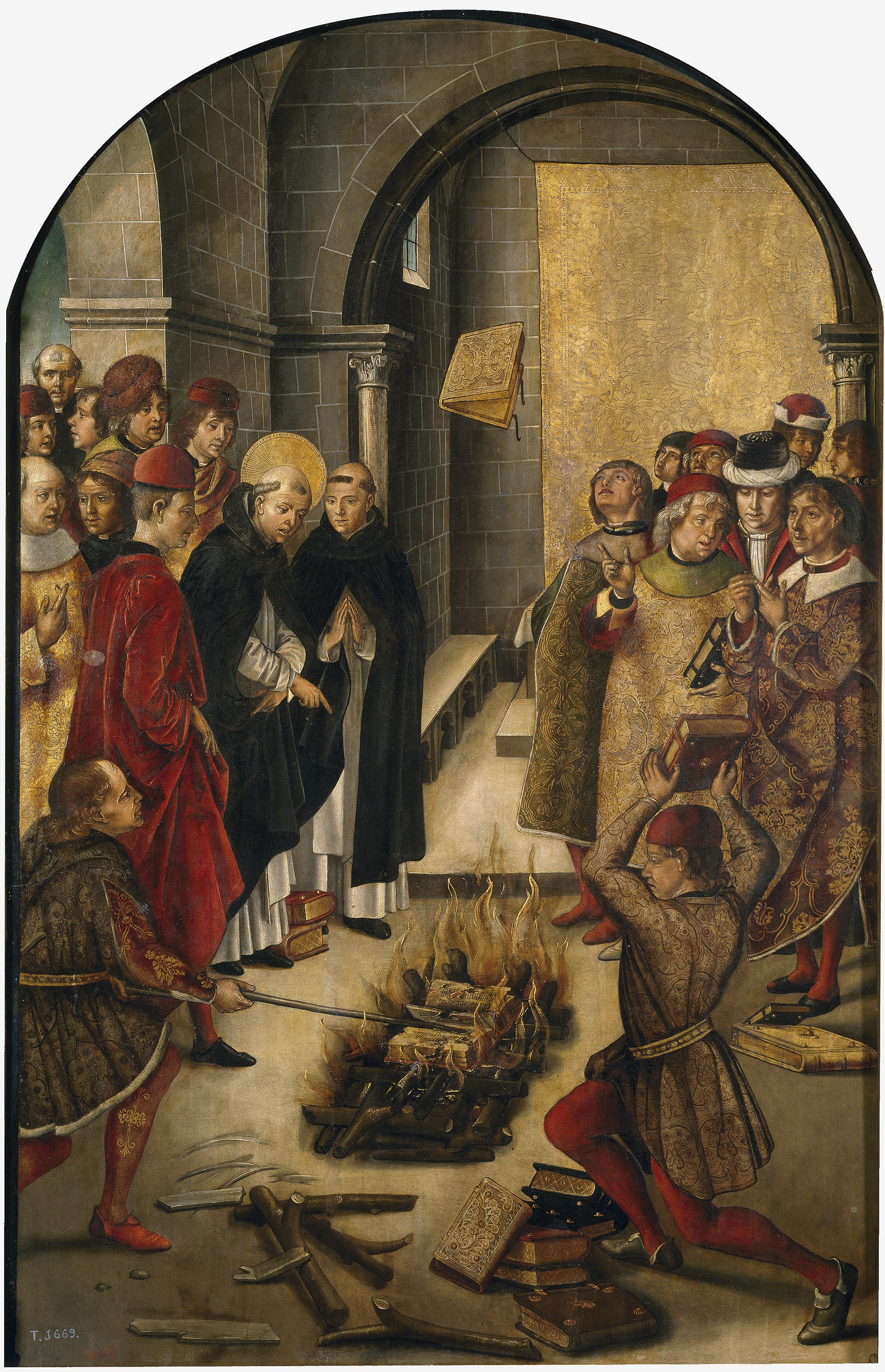
Painting by Pedro Berruguete portraying the story of a disputation between Saint Dominic and the Cathars (Albigensians), in which the books of both were thrown on a fire and Dominic's books were miraculously preserved from the flames

Catharism was a Christian dualist or Gnostic movement between the 12th and 14th centuries which thrived in Southern Europe, particularly in northern Italy and southern France. Followers were described as Cathars and referred to themselves as Good Christians, and are now mainly remembered for a prolonged period of persecution by the Catholic Church, which did not recognize their unorthodox Christianity. Catharism arrived in Western Europe in the Languedoc region of France in the 11th century. While most information concerning Cathar belief was written by their accusers, and therefore may be inaccurate, purportedly they were strict pacifists and rigorous ascetics, abjuring war, killing, lying, swearing, and carnal relations in accordance with their understanding of the Gospel. Allegedly rejecting the Old Testament, Cathars despised dogmatic elements of Christianity, while their Priests (Perfects) subsisted on a diet of little more than vegetables cooked in oil, or fish not a product of sexual union. "Caedite eos. Novit enim Dominus qui sunt eius." is a phrase reportedly spoken by the commander of the Albigensian Crusade, prior to the massacre at Béziers on 22 July 1209. A direct translation of the Medieval Latin phrase is "Kill them. The Lord knows those that are his own."

=== Lollardy ===
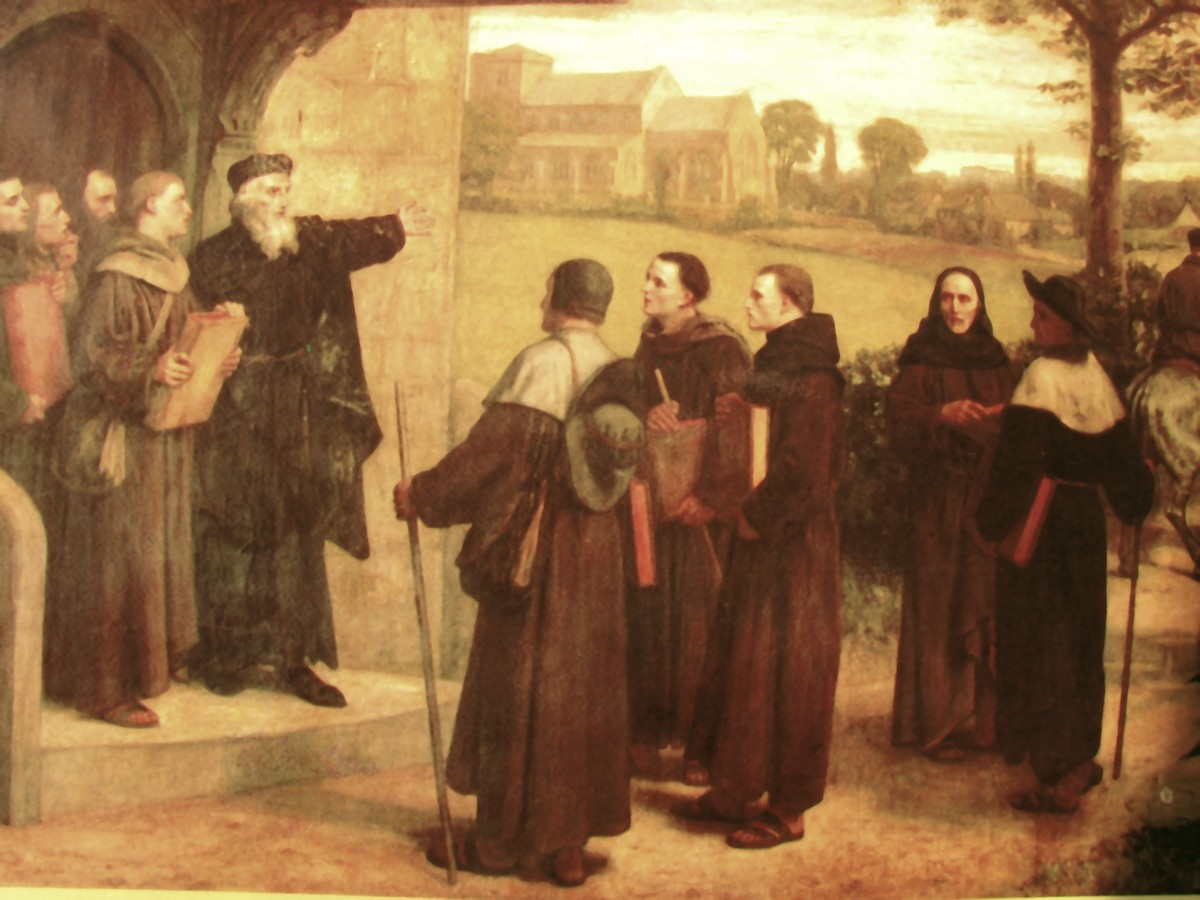
In this 19th-century illustration, John Wycliffe is shown giving the Bible translation that bore his name to his Lollard followers.

The Twelve Conclusions of the Lollards, a 1395 document of Lollardy, asserts that Christians should refrain from warfare, and in particular that wars given religious justifications, such as crusades, are blasphemous because Christ taught men to love and forgive their enemies.

=== Post-Reformation ===
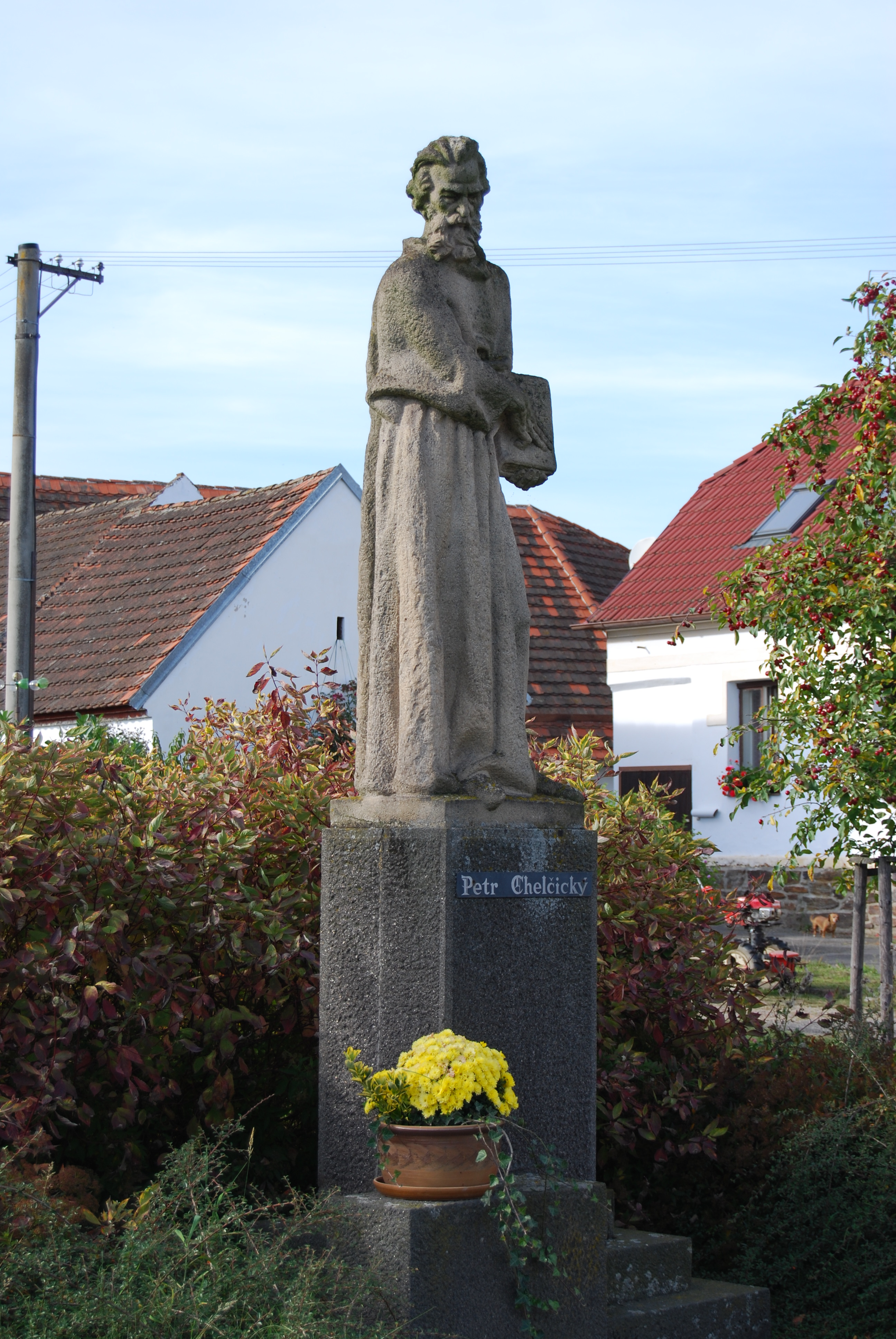
Petr Chelčický's statue in Chelčice

As early as 1420, Petr Chelčický taught that Christians must never use violence or killing. Chelčický used the parable of the wheat and the tares (Matthew 13:24–30) to show that both the sinners and the saints should be allowed to live together until the harvest. He thought that it is wrong to kill even the sinful and that Christians should refuse military service. He argued that if the poor refused, the lords would have no one to go to war for them.

Nearly a century later, the Catholic humanist Erasmus adopted a similar pacifistic view against indiscriminate warfare in his The Complaint of Peace (1517) by asserting that the only sufficient legitimate condition for waging war is whether it is first supported by a vote of all the people. Soon thereafter, the German theologian and mystic Sebastian Franck argued in his War Book of Peace (1539) that a "Just War" is as rare as "storkes in winter". Since then, many other Christians have made similar stands for pacifism as the following quotes show:

The Scriptures teach that there are two opposing princes and two opposing kingdoms: the one is the Prince of peace; the other the prince of strife. Each of these princes has his particular kingdom and as the prince is so is also the kingdom. The Prince of peace is Christ Jesus; His kingdom is the kingdom of peace, which is His church; His messengers are the messengers of peace; His Word is the word of peace; His body is the body of peace; His children are the seed of peace.

— Menno Simons (1494–1561), Reply to False Accusations, III

To our most bitter opponents we say: 'We shall match your capacity to inflict suffering by our capacity to endure suffering. We shall meet your physical force with soul force. Do to us what you will, and we shall continue to love you.'

— Martin Luther King Jr. (1929–1968), "Loving your Enemies" in Strength to Love

Love without courage and wisdom is sentimentality, as with the ordinary church member. Courage without love and wisdom is foolhardiness, as with the ordinary soldier. Wisdom without love and courage is cowardice, as with the ordinary intellectual. Therefore one who has love, courage, and wisdom is the one in a million who moves the world, as with Jesus, Buddha, and Gandhi.

— Ammon Hennacy (1893–1970)

"What do you mean by anarchist-pacifist?" First, I would say that the two words should go together, especially [...] when more and more people, even priests, are turning to violence, and are finding their heroes in Camillo Torres among the priests, and Che Guevara among laymen. The attraction is strong, because both men literally laid down their lives for their brothers. "Greater love hath no man than this." "Let me say, at the risk of seeming ridiculous, that the true revolutionary is guided by great feelings of love." Che Guevara wrote this, and he is quoted by Chicano youth in El Grito Del Norte.

— Dorothy Day (1897–1980), "On Pilgrimage — Our Spring Appeal", Catholic Worker

Charles Spurgeon did not explicitly identify as a pacifist but expressed very strongly worded anti-war sentiment. Leo Tolstoy wrote extensively on Christian pacifism, while Mohandas K. Gandhi considered Tolstoy's The Kingdom of God is Within You as the text to have the most influence in his life.

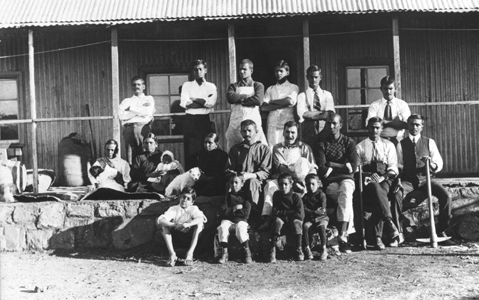
Some members of Tolstoy Farm in 1910. Gandhi is in the middle, second row fifth from the right.

== Christian pacifist denominations ==
The first conscientious objector in the modern sense was a Quaker in 1815. Some Quakers had originally served in Cromwell's New Model Army before the peace testimony of Friends was issued after the restoration of the British monarchy in 1660. A number of Christian denominations have taken pacifist positions institutionally, including the Quakers and Mennonites.

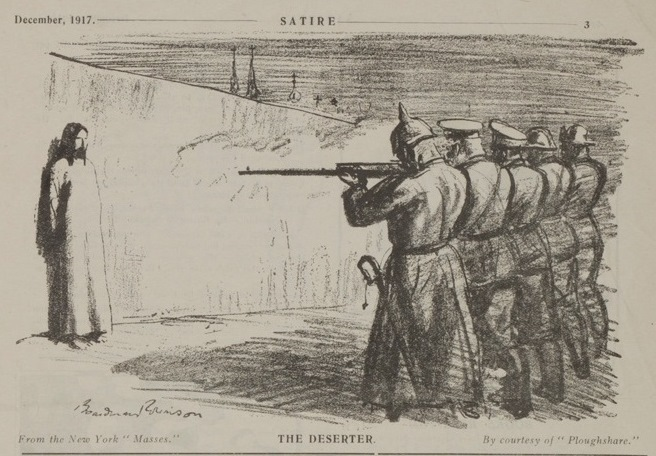
The Deserter (1916) by Boardman Robinson

The term "historical peace churches" refers to three churches—the Church of the Brethren, the Mennonites and the Quakers—who took part in the first peace church conference, in Kansas in 1935, and who have worked together to represent the view of Christian pacifism. Of these, both Mennonites and the Schwarzenau Brethren are Anabaptist Churches.

=== Anabaptist churches ===
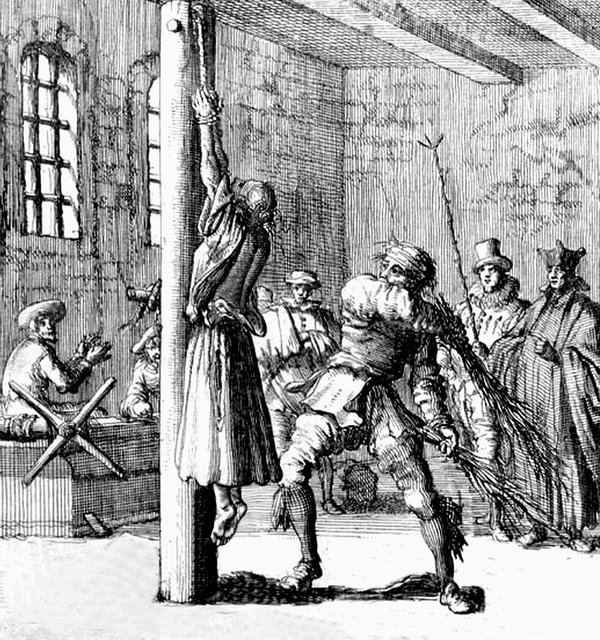
Birching of Anabaptist martyr Ursula, Maastricht, 1570; engraving by Jan Luyken from Martyrs Mirror

Traditionally, Anabaptists hold firmly to their beliefs in nonviolence. Many of these churches continue to advocate nonviolence, including the Anabaptist traditions of the Mennonites, the Amish, the Hutterites, the Schwarzenau Brethren, the River Brethren (such as the Old Order River Brethren and Brethren in Christ), the Apostolic Christian Church, and the Bruderhof Communities.

=== Christadelphians ===
Although the group had already separated from the Campbellites, a part of the Restoration Movement, after 1848 for theological reasons as the "Royal Assembly of Believers", among other names, the "Christadelphians" formed as a church formally in 1863 in response to conscription in the American Civil War. They are one of the few churches to have been legally formed over the issue of Christian pacifism. The British and Canadian arms of the group adopted the name "Christadelphian" in the following year, 1864, and also maintained objection to military service during the First and Second World Wars. Unlike Quakers, Christadelphians generally refused all forms of military service, including stretcher bearers and medics, preferring non-uniformed civil hospital service.

=== Churches of God (7th day) ===
The different groups evolving under the name Church of God (7th day) stand opposed to carnal warfare, based on Matthew 26:52; Revelation 13:10; Romans 12:19–21. They believe the weapons of their warfare to not be carnal but spiritual (II Corinthians 10:3–5; Ephesians 6:11–18).

=== Doukhobors ===
The Doukhobors are a Spiritual Christian denomination that advocate pacifism. On June 29, 1895, the Doukhobors, in what is known as the "Burning of the Arms", "piled up their swords, guns, and other weapons and burned them in large bonfires while they sang psalms".

=== Holiness pacifists ===
The Wesleyan Methodist Church, one of the first Methodist denominations of the holiness movement, opposed war as documented in their 1844 Book of Discipline, that noted that the Gospel is in "every way opposed to the practice of War in all its forms; and those customs which tend to foster and perpetuate war spirit, [are] inconsistent with the benevolent designs of the Christian religion."

The Reformed Free Methodist Church, Emmanuel Association, Immanuel Missionary Church, Church of God (Guthrie, Oklahoma), First Bible Holiness Church, and Christ's Sanctified Holy Church are denominations in the holiness movement known for their opposition to war today; they are known as "holiness pacifists". The Emmanuel Association teaches:

We feel bound explicitly to avow our unshaken persuasion that War is utterly incompatible with the plain precepts of our divine Lord and Law-giver, and with the whole spirit of the Gospel; and that no plea of necessity or policy, however urgent or peculiar, can avail to release either individuals or nations for the paramount allegiance which they owe to Him who hath said, "Love your enemies." Therefore, we cannot participate in war (Rom. 12:19), war activities, or compulsory training.

=== Jehovah's Witnesses ===
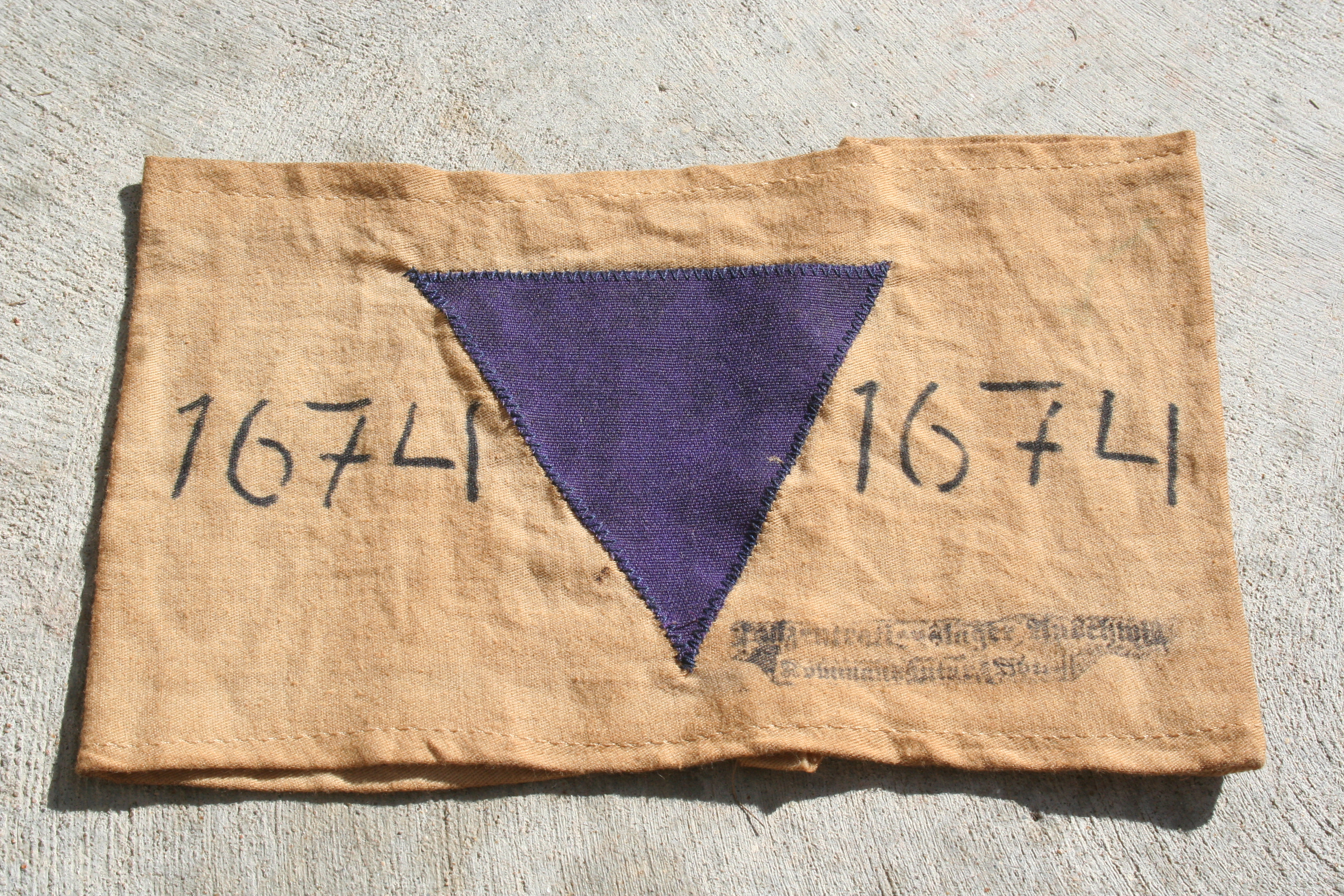
The purple triangle was a concentration camp badge used by the Nazis to identify Jehovah's Witnesses in Nazi Germany.

The beliefs and practices of Jehovah's Witnesses have engendered controversy throughout their history. Consequently, the denomination has been opposed by local governments, communities, and religious groups. Many Christian denominations consider the interpretations and doctrines of Jehovah's Witnesses heretical, and some professors of religion have classified the denomination as a cult.

According to law professor Archibald Cox, Jehovah's Witnesses in the United States were "the principal victims of religious persecution ... they began to attract attention and provoke repression in the 1930s, when their proselytizing and numbers rapidly increased." At times, political and religious animosity against Jehovah's Witnesses has led to mob action and governmental repression in various countries including the United States, Canada and Nazi Germany.

During World War II, Jehovah's Witnesses were targeted in the United States, Canada, and many other countries because they refused to serve in the military or contribute to the war effort due to their doctrine of political neutrality. In Canada, Jehovah's Witnesses were interned in camps along with political dissidents and people of Japanese and Chinese descent.

=== Molokans ===
The Molokans are a Spiritual Christian denomination that advocate pacifism. They have historically been persecuted for failing to bear arms.

=== Moravian Church ===
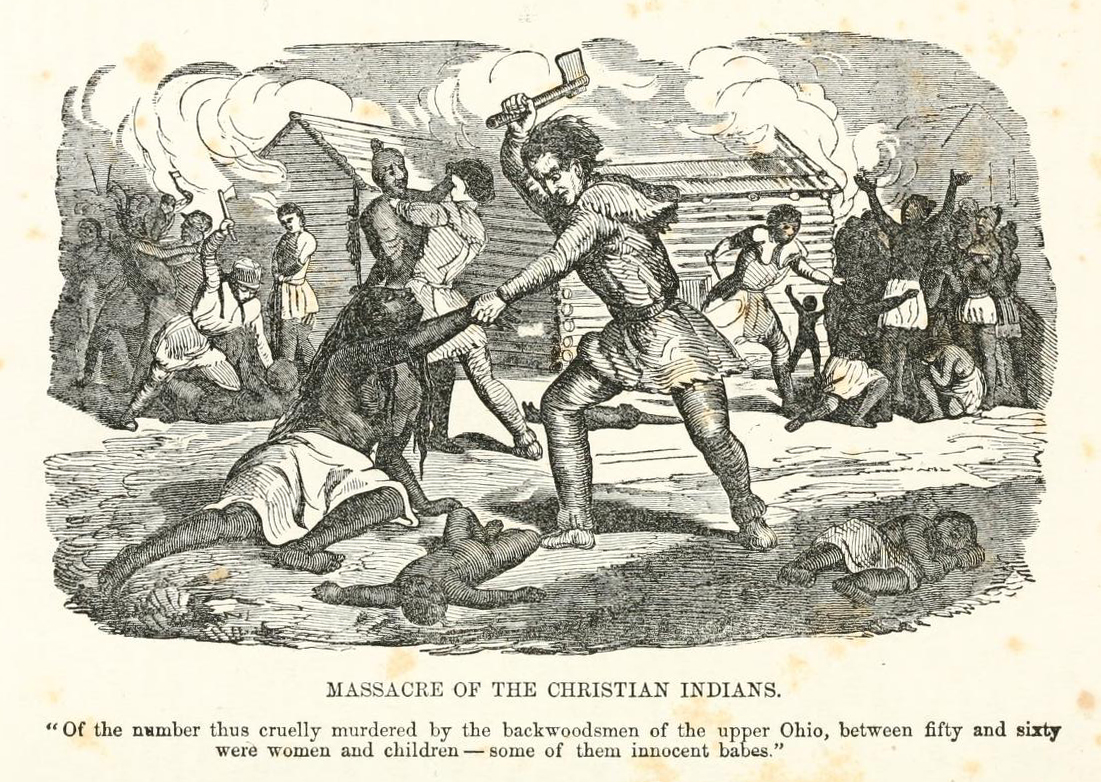
Engraving of the Gnadenhutten massacre from 1852

The Moravian Church historically adheres to the position of Christian pacifism, evidenced in atrocities such as the Gnadenhutten massacre, where the Lenape Moravian martyrs practiced nonresistance with their murderers, singing hymns until their execution by American revolutionaries.

=== Quakers ===
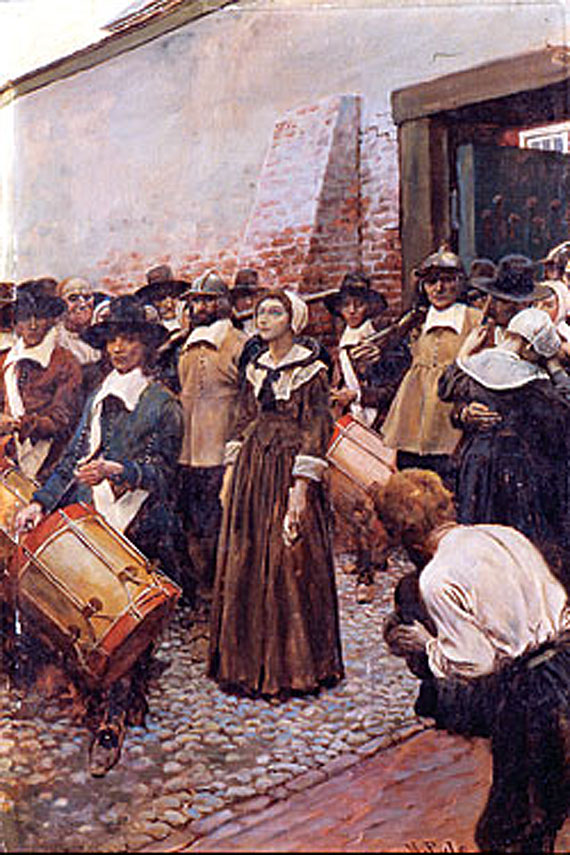
Mary Dyer being led to the gallows in Boston in 1660, painted c. 1905 (Painting by Howard Pyle)

Most Quakers, also known as Friends (members of the Religious Society of Friends), hold peace as a core value, including the refusal to participate in war going as far as forming the Friends' Ambulance Unit with the aim of "co-operating with others to build up a new world rather than fighting to destroy the old", and the American Friends Service Committee during the two World Wars and subsequent conflicts.

=== Shakers ===
Shakers, who emerged in part from Quakerism in 1747, do not believe that it is acceptable to kill or harm others, even in times of war.

=== Seventh-day Adventists ===
During the American Civil War in 1864, shortly after the formation of the Seventh-day Adventist Church, the Seventh-day Adventists declared, "The denomination of Christians calling themselves Seventh-day Adventists, taking the Bible as their rule of faith and practice, are unanimous in their views that its teaching are contrary to the spirit and practice of war; hence, they have ever been conscientiously opposed to bearing arms."

The general Adventist movement from 1867 followed a policy of conscientious objection. This was confirmed by the Seventh-day Adventist Church in 1914. The official policy allows for military service in non-combative roles such as medical corps; much like Seventh-day Adventist Desmond Doss, who was the first conscientious objector to receive the Medal of Honor and one of only three so honored; and other supportive roles which do not require to kill or carry a weapon. In practice today, as a pastor from the Seventh-day Adventist church comments in an online magazine runs by members of the Seventh-day Adventist church: "Today in a volunteer army a lot of Adventist young men and women join the military in combat positions, and there are many Adventist pastors electing for military chaplaincy positions, supporting combatants and non-combatants alike. On Veteran's Day, American churches across the country take time to give honor and respect to those who 'served their country,' without any attempt to differentiate how they served, whether as bomber pilots, Navy Seals, or Operation Whitecoat guinea pigs. I have yet to see a service honoring those who ran away to Canada to avoid participation in the senseless carnage of Vietnam in their Biblical pacifism."

=== Evangelical Russian Church ===
The Eastern Protestant Evangelical Russian Church advocates for peace between Ukraine and Russia, and between Israel and Palestine.

== Other denominations ==
=== Anglicanism ===
Lambeth Conference 1930 Resolution 25 declares that, "The Conference affirms that war as a method of settling international disputes is incompatible with the teaching and example of our Lord Jesus Christ." The 1948, 1958 and 1968 conferences re-ratified this position.

The Anglican Pacifist Fellowship lobbies the various dioceses of the church to uphold this resolution and work constructively for peace.

=== Baptist ===
Some 400 Baptists refused combatant duty during World War II.

Martin Luther King Jr. was an American Baptist minister and activist who became the most visible spokesman and leader in the civil rights movement from 1955 until his assassination in 1968. An African American church leader and the son of early civil rights activist and minister Martin Luther King Sr., King advanced civil rights for people of color in the United States through nonviolence and civil disobedience, inspired by his Christian beliefs and the nonviolent activism of Mahatma Gandhi.

Many modern Calvinists, such as André Trocmé, have been pacifists.

=== Lutheranism ===
The Lutheran Church of Australia recognises conscientious objection to war as Biblically legitimate.

Since the Second World War, many notable Lutherans have been pacifists.

== Secular interpretations ==
According to the acclaimed 20th century socialist writer Upton Sinclair,

…the subtle worm assumed the guise of no less a person than the Emperor himself, suggesting that he should become a convert to the new faith, so that the Church and he might work together for the greater glory of God. The bishops and fathers of the Church, ambitious for their organization, fell for this scheme, and Satan went off laughing to himself. He had got everything he had asked from Jesus three hundred years before; he had got the world's greatest religion.

Social critic Noam Chomsky writes,

The Gospels are radical pacifist material, if you take a look at them. When the Roman emperor Constantine adopted Christianity he shifted it from a radical pacifist religion to the religion of the Roman Empire. So the cross, which was symbol of the suffering of the poor, was put on the shield of Roman soldiers. Since that time the Church has been pretty much the church of the rich and the powerful—the opposite of the message of the Gospels. Liberation theology, in Brazil particularly, brought the actual Gospels to peasants.

== Christian pacifism in action ==
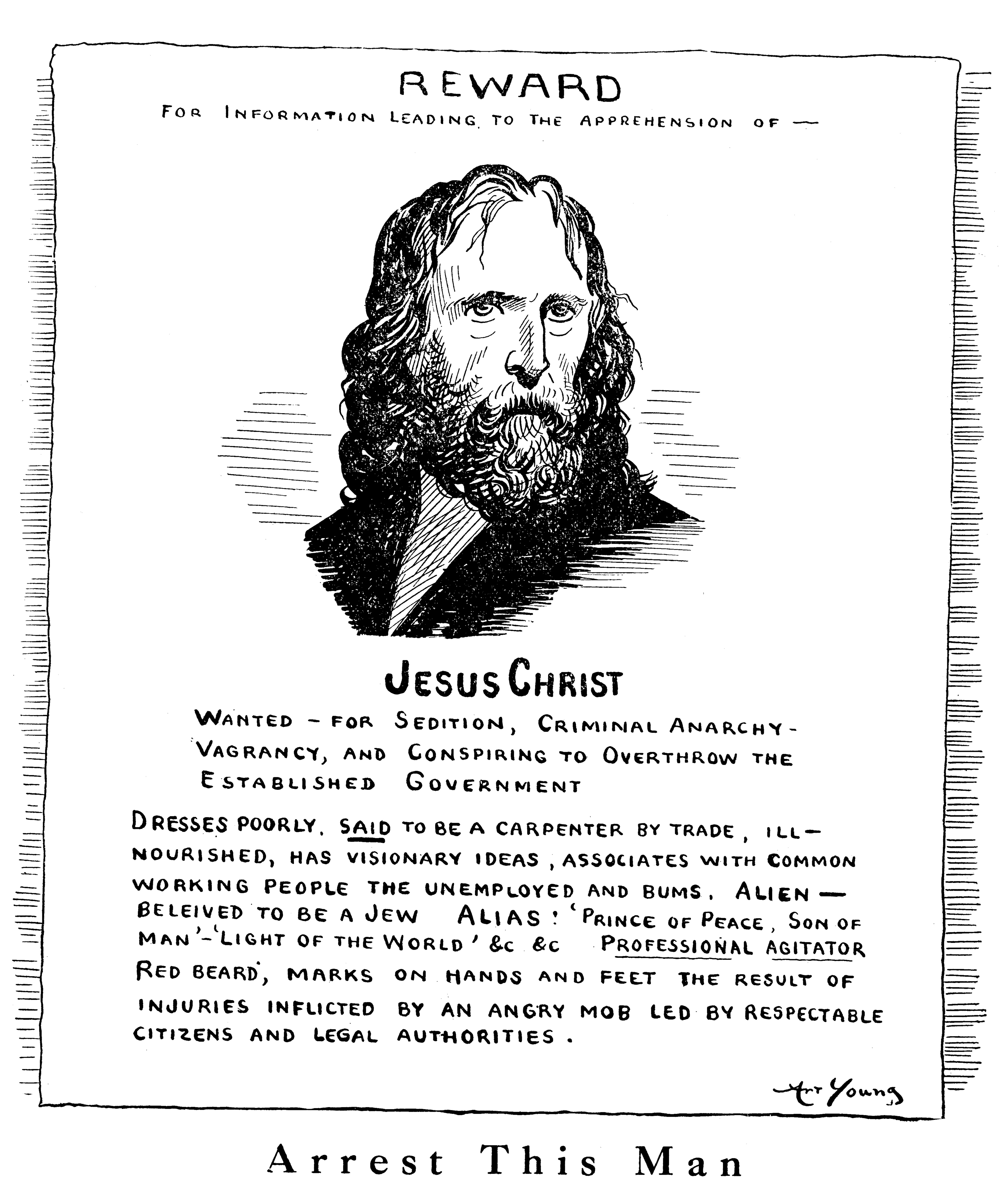
Arrest This Man (c. 1921) by Art Young

19th-century Christian abolitionists and anarchists Adin Ballou and William Lloyd Garrison were critical of the violent and coercive nature of all human governments. Ballou and Garrison advocated for nonresistance against the institution of slavery and imperialism, as they saw the Bible as the embodiment of “passive nonresistance” and the only way to achieve the new millennium on Earth. Instead of violence, they advocated for moral suasion or consistent rebukes against the institution of slavery so to persuade racist southerns and indifferent northerners to the abolitionist's cause. Garrison and Ballou, along with Amos Bronson Alcott, Maria Weston Chapman, Stephen Symonds Foster, Abby Kelley, Samuel May, and Henry C. Wright, founded the New England Non-Resistance Society in 1838 in Boston. The society condemned the use of force in resisting evil, in war, for the death penalty, or in self-defense, renounced allegiance to human government, and called for the immediate abolition of slavery without compensation. Garrison's weekly abolitionist newspaper The Liberator (1831–1865) and Ballou's Christian utopian commune the Hopedale Community (established in 1843 in Milford, Massachusetts) were also some of their key efforts in propagating Christian pacifism in the United States. Their writings on Christian nonresistance also influenced Leo Tolstoy's theo-political ideology and his non-fiction texts like The Kingdom of God is Within You.

Before Tolstoy, and similar to Northern Abolitionists (though from a Southern anti-slavery viewpoint), David Lipscomb argued in 1866–1867 that Christians could not support warfare and should not vote, because human governments throughout history waged wars. His book, Civil Government: Its Origin, Mission, and Destiny, and The Christian's Relation To It, maintained a Christian pacifist and proto-anarchist position in the wake of the American Civil War.

From the beginning of the First World War, Christian pacifist organizations emerged to support Christians in denominations other than the historic peace churches. The first was the interdenominational Fellowship of Reconciliation ("FoR"), founded in Britain in 1915 but soon joined by sister organizations in the U.S. and other countries. Today pacifist organizations serving specific denominations are more or less closely allied with the FoR: they include the Methodist Peace Fellowship (established in 1933), the Anglican Pacifist Fellowship (established in 1937), Pax Christi (Roman Catholic, established in 1945), and so forth. The Network of Christian Peace Organisations (NCPO) is a UK-based ecumenical peace network of 28 organizations. Some of these organizations do not take strictly pacifist positions, describing themselves instead as advocating nonviolence, and some either have members who would not consider themselves Christians or are explicitly interfaith. However, they share historical and philosophical roots in Christian pacifism.

In some cases Christian churches, even if not necessarily committed to Christian pacifism, have supported particular campaigns of nonviolent resistance, also often called civil resistance. Examples include the Southern Christian Leadership Conference (a grouping of churches in the southern United States) in supporting the Civil Rights Movement; the Chilean Catholic Church's support for the civic action against authoritarian rule in Pinochet's Chile in the 1980s; and the Polish Catholic Church's support for the Solidarity movement in Poland in the 1980s.

Walter Wink writes that "There are three general responses to evil: (1) passivity, (2) violent opposition, and (3) the third way of militant nonviolence articulated by Jesus. Human evolution has conditioned us for only the first two of these responses: fight or flight." This understanding typifies Walter Wink's book, Jesus and Nonviolence: A Third Way.

=== First World War ===
Ben Salmon was an American Catholic pacifist and outspoken critic of just war theory, as he believed all war to be unjust. During the First World War, Salmon was arrested for refusing to complete a Selective Service and report for induction. He was court-martialed at Camp Dodge, Iowa on July 24, 1918, and sentenced to death. This was later revised to 25 years hard labor. Salmon's steadfast pacifism has since been cited as an inspiration for other Catholics, such as Fathers Daniel Berrigan and John Dear.

The Episcopal bishop Paul Jones, who had associated himself with the Fellowship of Reconciliation and had been quite outspoken in his opposition to the war, was forced to resign his Utah see in April 1918.

In 1918, four Hutterite brothers from South Dakota, Jacob Wipf and David, Joseph and Michael Hofer were imprisoned at Alcatraz for refusing to fight in military or put on a military uniform; Joseph and Michael Hofer died in late 1918 at Fort Leavenworth, Kansas, due to the harsh conditions of the imprisonment. In the Remembering Muted Voices symposium in October 2017, the lives and witness of World War I peace activists, including the four Hutterite brothers, were remembered. The symposium was sponsored by the American Civil Liberties Union, Peace History Society, Plough Publishing House, and the Vaughan Williams Charitable Trust.

=== Second World War ===
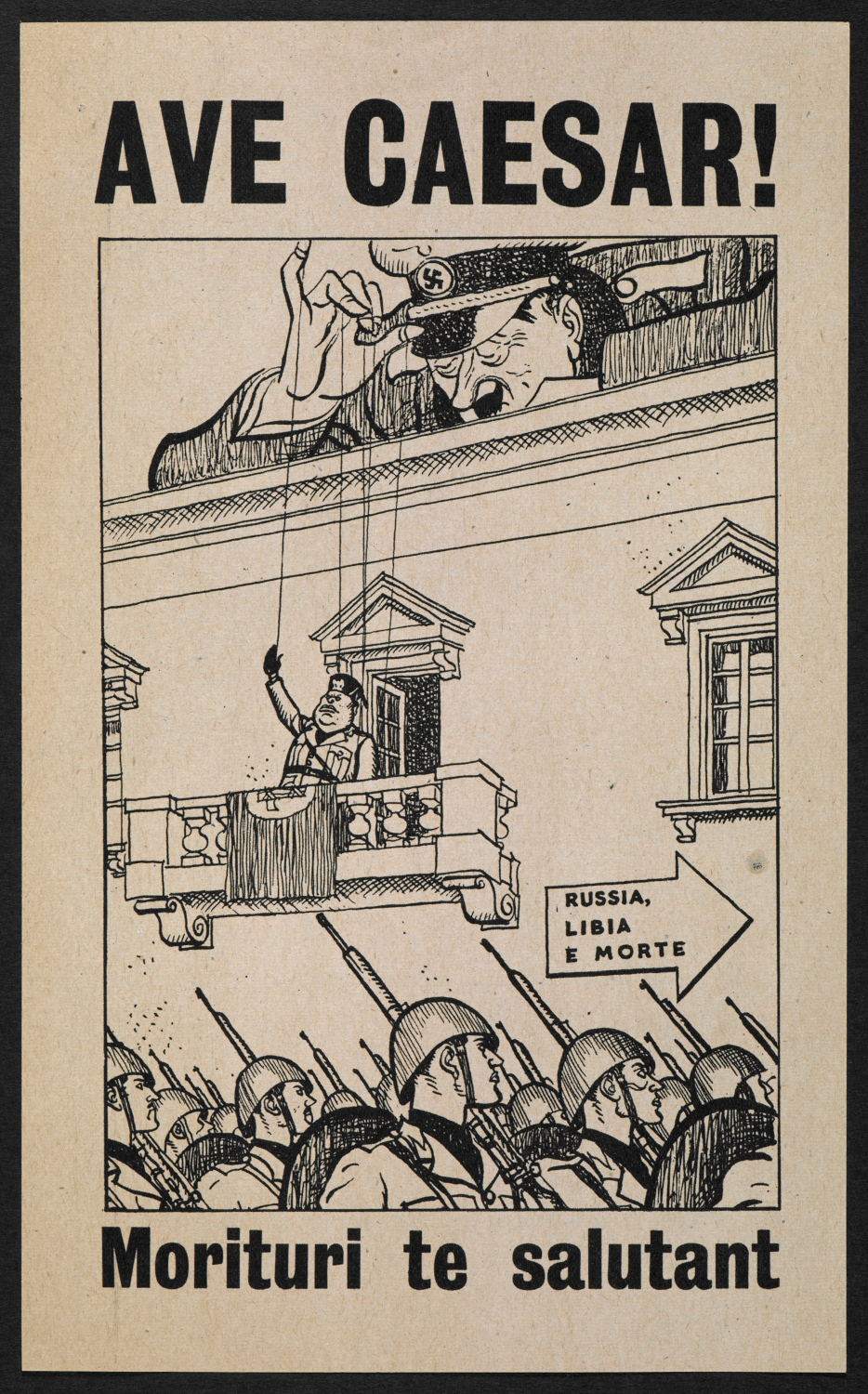
Ave Caesar! Morituri te salutant (Hail Caesar! Those about to die salute you) (1941)

In the winter of 1935–36, before the onset of World War II, Jehovah's Witnesses have been reported to have made up 20–40% of the prisoners in concentration camps. Although Jehovah's Witnesses made up the vast majority of those wearing the purple triangle, a concentration camp badge used by the Nazis to identify Jehovah's Witnesses in Nazi Germany, a few members of other small pacifist religious groups were also included.

The French Christian pacifists André and Magda Trocmé helped conceal hundreds of Jews fleeing the Nazis in the village of Le Chambon-sur-Lignon. After the war, the Trocmés were declared Righteous Among the Nations.

The radical Christian pacifist John Middleton Murry changed his opinions on Christian pacifism in light of the Holocaust. In his early years as a writer of The Necessity of Pacifism (1937) and as editor of the weekly London newspaper, Peace News, he argued that Nazi Germany should be allowed retain control of mainland Europe, arguing Nazism was a lesser evil compared to the horrors of a total war. Later, he recanted his pacifism in 1948 and promoted a preventative war against the Soviet Union.

During the Holocaust in Bulgaria, protests by Bulgarian public figures, among them Bulgarian Orthodox Church bishops Stefan of Sofia and Kiril of Plovdiv, leaders of professional organisations, and others – persuaded the Tsar first to stop the deportation of Jews temporarily in March 1943, and two months later to postpone it indefinitely. The Jews whose deportation from Bulgaria was halted, including all Sofia's 25,743 Jews, nonetheless had their property confiscated, were forcibly relocated within the country, and all Jewish males between the ages of 20 and 46 were conscripted into the Labour Corps until September 1944. The events that prevented the deportation to extermination camps of about 48,000 Jews in spring 1943 are termed the Rescue of the Bulgarian Jews. Although most Jews who were deported were murdered, the survival rate of the Jewish population in Bulgaria was one of the highest in Axis Europe.

Vera Brittain was another British Christian pacifist. She worked as a fire warden and by travelling around the country raising funds for the Peace Pledge Union's food relief campaign. She was vilified for speaking out against the saturation bombing of German cities through her 1944 booklet Massacre by Bombing. Her principled pacifist position was vindicated somewhat when, in 1945, the Nazi's Black Book of 2000 people to be immediately arrested in Britain after a German invasion was shown to include her name. After the war, Brittain worked for Peace News magazine, "writing articles against apartheid and colonialism and in favour of nuclear disarmament" from a Christian perspective.

=== Post-Second World War ===
Having been inspired by the Sermon on the Mount, Thomas launched the White House Peace Vigil in 1981; the longest running peace vigil in US history. Over the years, he was joined by numerous anti-war activists including those from the Catholic Worker Movement and Plowshares Movement.

Jehovah's Witness members have been imprisoned in many countries for their refusal of conscription or compulsory military service. Their religious activities are banned or restricted in some countries, including Singapore, China, Vietnam, Russia and many Muslim-majority countries.

In 2017, the Methodist minister Dan Woodhouse and the Quaker Sam Walton entered the British Aerospace Warton Aerodrome site to try to disarm Typhoon fighter jets bound for Saudi Arabia. They targeted these jets because they would be used in Saudi Arabia's bombing campaign of Yemen. They were arrested before they were able to do any damage. This was the same BAE systems site in which the Seeds of Hope group of the Plowshares movement damaged a Hawk fighter jet in 1996. They appeared in court facing charges of criminal damage in October 2017 and were both found not guilty.

=== War tax resistance ===
Demons are the magistrates of this world: they bear the fasces.

— Tertullian

Opposition to war has led some, like Ammon Hennacy, to a form of tax resistance in which they reduce their income below the tax threshold by taking up a simple living lifestyle. These individuals believe that their government is engaged in immoral, unethical or destructive activities such as war, and paying taxes inevitably funds these activities.

Another method of war tax resistance includes not paying a percentage of one's taxes, the percentage being the percent of the Federal Budget allotted to defense and other war-related spending. The National War Tax Resistance Coordinating Committee includes protest methods such as "Pay[ing] the tax with hundreds of small-denomination checks or coins." (See also: Conscientious objection to military taxation)

== See also ==
- Catholic peace traditions
- Religion and peacebuilding
- Turning the other cheek
