= Bethany Hughes =

Canadian cancer patient (1985–2002)

Bethany Hughes (1985–2002) was a 17-year-old Jehovah's Witness who died from leukemia. Hughes was forced to accept blood transfusions, which was a treatment that interfered with her beliefs. The case received significant media attention.

== Life ==
Bethany Hughes was born to Arliss and Lawrence Hughes. She had a sister. Hughes was diagnosed with leukemia in February 2002, when she was 16. The suggested course of treatment was chemotherapy and blood transfusions. Her father was a member of the faith before she became ill; he was disfellowshipped and shunned for changing his beliefs on blood. He expressed support for her receiving blood transfusions as treatment. Shortly after Hughes' diagnosis, the province of Alberta applied for child custody in order to ensure she received the blood transfusions, which was eventually granted. Hughes and her mother sought legal counsel to appeal the decision, but it was upheld by both the Alberta Court of Appeal and the Supreme Court of Canada. She received a total of 38 blood transfusions under sedation. Hughes was frustrated that she could not have bodily autonomy until she was 18. Custody went back to her mother in July 2002, when doctors determined that Hughes condition had worsened and that she should receive palliative care. Hughes then received an alternative medicine treatment involving arsenic. She died in September 2002.

== Legal cases ==
The legal case brought by the province of Alberta focused on the average survival rates for her prescribed treatment, and the obligation to preserve life. The estimated rate of survival for Hughes condition with blood transfusions was less than 50%. Hughes' mother believed that blood transfusions were an experimental treatment. The first hearing to grant child custody to the province was denied. The trial judge made her decision at the hospital where Hughes was admitted. Some doctors involved in Hughes' treatment considered her to be a mature minor and did not want to force her to have blood transfusions. The judge then granted the province's request for custody at the second hearing.

After Hughes' death, her father became the executor of her estate. He filed a wrongful death lawsuit against the Watchtower Bible and Tract Society for $975,000. He argued that his daughter was coerced into making decisions about her treatment. It was dismissed by an Alberta court for being about the group's religious beliefs. This decision was upheld after appeals.

== Legacy ==
In her interactions with the media, Hughes was often referred to as "Mia". She chose this name for herself as word play on leukemia. The Globe and Mail described Hughes as a "legal crusader for children's rights". Lori Beaman concluded that the court forcing blood transfusions as treatment preferred to think of Hughes as unduly influenced by others instead of thinking of her as a young woman firmly committed to her faith.

In a 2016 interview with the Canadian Broadcasting Corporation, Hughes' father mentioned that he did not believe his daughter was capable of informed consent. He stated that Jehovah's Witness publications promote misinformation about the effectiveness of blood transfusions, that members who willingly accept them are shunned, and that his daughter had received letters from hundreds of Jehovah's Witnesses urging her not to accept blood.

== See also ==
- Jehovah's Witnesses in Canada
- Jehovah's Witnesses and governments

== Sources ==
- Beaman, Lori (2008). Defining Harm: Religious Freedom and the Limits of the Law. UBC Press. ISBN 978-0-7748-1429-4.
