= Operation North =

Soviet deportation operation

Operation North (Russian: Операция "Север", romanized: Operatsiya "Sever") was the code name which was assigned by the USSR Ministry of State Security to the massive deportation of Jehovah's Witnesses and their families to Siberia in the Soviet Union on 1 and 8 April 1951.

== Background ==
There were almost no Jehovah's Witnesses in the Soviet Union until its annexation of the Baltic States, Western Belarus, Western Ukraine, Bessarabia, and Northern Bukovina; most of them were living in the Moldavian SSR and Ukrainian SSR. Jehovah's Witnesses came into the conflict with the Soviet government, primarily because they refused to join the military. Their teachings were soon regarded as anti-Soviet. Members of religious groups, including Jehovah's Witnesses, qualified as religious elements which were considered a potential source of danger by the communist regime. In November 1950, Viktor Abakumov gave Stalin a plan to deport them, and Stalin suggested that the deportation should occur in March–April 1951.

== Implementation ==
On February 19, 1951, Abakumov delivered a secret notice to Stalin, detailing plans for the deportations of Jehovah's Witnesses to Tomsk Oblast and Irkutsk Oblast. It said, in particular, that during 1947–1950, 1048 Jehovah's Witnesses leaders and activists had been arrested, 5 underground print houses had been uncovered, and large amounts of printed matter confiscated. The deportees were permitted to take a maximum of 150 kilograms of property, packed within two hours; the remaining property was to be confiscated "to cover the obligations of the deportees before the state". Abakumov's notice listed the following planned numbers of deportees:

- Total number: 8576 persons (3048 families), including:
  - Ukrainian SSR — 6140 persons (2020 families);
  - Byelorussian SSR — 394 persons (153 families);
  - Moldavian SSR — 1675 persons (670 families);
  - Latvian SSR — 52 persons (27 families);
  - Lithuanian SSR — 76 persons (48 families);
  - Estonian SSR — 250 persons (130 families).

On March 3, 1951, the USSR Council of Ministers issued the corresponding decree (no. 667-339ss), followed by an order of the Ministry of State Security (no. 00193) of March 5, 1951. On March 24, the Moldavian SSR Council of Ministers issued the decree on the confiscation and selling of the property of the deportees. Operation North started at 4 a.m. on April 1, 1951, and round-ups ended on April 2. The deportees were classified as "special settlers". From the Moldavian SSR, there were 2,617 persons (723 families) deported on the night of March 31 to April 1, 1951. In total, 9,973 persons were deported from the whole country.

== Amnesty and exculpation ==
On September 30, 1965, a decree (no. 4020-1U) of the Presidium of the USSR Council of Ministers cancelled the "special settlement" restriction for members of the four deported religious groups and their family members. However, this decree signed by Anastas Mikoyan stated that there would be no compensation for the confiscated property, and that return to their previous places of residence was subject to the approval of the local administrations. Though released, Jehovah's Witnesses remained the subject of legal persecution due to their ideology classified as anti-Soviet. The organization was legalized in the Soviet Union in 1991 and re-banned by Russia in 2017. The deported and convicted Jehovah's Witnesses (and other religion-related convicts) were rehabilitated as victims of Soviet political repressions by the ukase no. 378 of President of the Russian Federation of March 3, 1996, "On the Measures for Rehabilitation of the Priests and Believers who had become Victims of Unjustified Repressions" (О мерах по реабилитации священнослужителей и верующих, ставших жертвами необоснованных репрессий).

== Notable deportees ==
- Family of Zinaida Greceanîi, former prime Minister of Moldova

== See also ==
- Persecution of Christians in the Soviet Union
- Persecution of Jehovah's Witnesses
  - Persecution of Jehovah's Witnesses in Russia
