= Jehovah's Witnesses in the United States =

Jehovah's Witnesses originated as a branch of the Bible Student movement, which developed in the United States in the 1870s among followers of Christian restorationist minister Charles Taze Russell. The movement split into several rival organizations after Russell's death in 1916, with Joseph Franklin Rutherford retaining control of The Watch Tower and the Watch Tower Bible and Tract Society of Pennsylvania, this group became known as Jehovah's Witnesses. Members of the denomination experienced religious persecution throughout the 1930s and 1940s.

== Demographics ==
The 2008 US Pew Forum on Religion & Public Life survey found a low retention rate among members of the denomination: about 37% of people raised in the group continued to identify as Jehovah's Witnesses. The next lowest retention rates were for Buddhism at 50% and Catholicism at 68%. The study also found that 65% of adult US Jehovah's Witnesses are converts. In 2016, Jehovah's Witnesses had the lowest average household income among surveyed religious groups, with approximately half of Witness households in the United States earning less than $30,000 a year. As of 2016, Jehovah's Witnesses are the most racially diverse Christian denomination in the United States.

== History ==
In July 1917, Rutherford released The Finished Mystery as a seventh volume to the Studies in the Scriptures series. He claimed it to be Russell's posthumous work, but it was actually written by Clayton Woodworth, George Fisher, and Gertrude Seibert. It strongly criticized Catholic and Protestant clergy and Christian involvement in the Great War. As a result, Watch Tower Society directors were jailed for sedition under the Espionage Act in 1918 and members were subjected to mob violence; the directors were released in March 1919 and charges against them were dropped in 1920.

During the late 1930s and the 1940s, Jehovah's Witnesses attacked the Roman Catholic Church and other Christian denominations so vigorously that multiple states and municipalities passed laws against their inflammatory preaching. During World War II, Witnesses experienced mob violence in America because they were perceived as being against the war effort. Political and religious animosity against the Witnesses led to mob action and government oppression. According to former United States Solicitor General, Archibald Cox, Jehovah's Witnesses in the United States were "the principal victims of religious persecution ... in the twentieth century," and added that, "they began to attract attention and provoke repression in the 1930s, when their proselytizing and numbers rapidly increased." In his 1964 study of prejudice toward minorities, Seymour Martin Lipset found that the Jehovah's Witnesses were among the most disliked of all religious minorities he researched; 41% of respondents expressed open dislike of them. In 1984, authors Merlin Brinkerhoff and Marlene Mackie concluded that after the so-called new cults, Jehovah's Witnesses were among the least accepted religious groups in the United States.

Legal challenges by Jehovah's Witnesses prompted a series of state and federal court rulings that reinforced judicial protections for civil liberties. Among the rights strengthened by Witness court victories in the US are the protection of religious conduct from federal and state interference, the right to abstain from patriotic rituals and military service, the right of patients to refuse medical treatment, and the right to engage in public discourse. Authors including William Whalen, Shawn Francis Peters and former members Barbara Grizzuti Harrison, Alan Rogerson, and William Schnell have claimed the arrests and mob violence in the 1930s and 1940s were the consequence of what appeared to be a deliberate course of provocation of authorities and other religious groups by Jehovah's Witnesses. Harrison, Schnell, and Whalen have suggested Rutherford invited and cultivated opposition for publicity purposes in a bid to attract dispossessed members of society, and to convince members that persecution by the outside world was evidence of the truth of their struggle to serve God.

=== Pledge of Allegiance ===
In 1935, Rutherford proscribed flag salutes, stating them to be a form of idolatry "contrary to the Word of God." This stance drew mob violence against Witnesses and a number of children of Witnesses were expelled from public schools. The Witnesses' apparent lack of patriotism angered local authorities, the American Legion, and others, resulting in vigilante violence during World War II. Men, women and children were injured and in some cases killed in mob attacks.

In 1940, the case of Minersville School District v. Gobitis received publicity in a lower federal court. The US Supreme Court ruled in an 8–1 decision that a school district's interest in creating national unity was sufficient to allow them to require that students salute the flag. After the court's decision in the Gobitis case, a new wave of persecution of Witnesses began across the nation. Lillian Gobitas later characterized the violence as "open season on Jehovah's Witnesses." The American Civil Liberties Union recorded 1,488 attacks on Witnesses in over 300 communities between May and October 1940. Angry mobs assaulted Witnesses, destroyed their property, boycotted their businesses and vandalized their places of worship. Less than a week after the court decision, a Kingdom Hall in Kennebunk, Maine was burnt down.

American Legion posts harassed Witnesses nationwide. At Klamath Falls, Oregon, members of the American Legion harassed Witnesses assembled for worship with requests to salute the flag and buy war bonds. They then attacked the Witnesses and besieged the meeting place, breaking windows, throwing in stink bombs, ammonia and burning kerosene rags. The Witnesses' cars were disabled and a number of them were overturned. The governor was compelled to call the state militia to disperse the mob, which reached 1,000 at its peak. In Texas, Witness missionaries were chased and beaten by vigilantes, and their literature was confiscated or burned.

First Lady Eleanor Roosevelt appealed publicly for calm, and newspaper editorials and the American legal community condemned the Gobitis decision as a blow to liberty. Several justices signaled their belief that the case had been "wrongly decided." On June 16, 1940, in an effort to dispel the mob action, the United States Attorney General, Francis Biddle, stated on a nationwide radio broadcast:

Jehovah's witnesses have been repeatedly set upon and beaten. They had committed no crime; but the mob adjudged they had, and meted out mob punishment. The Attorney General has ordered an immediate investigation of these outrages. The people must be alert and watchful, and above all cool and sane. Since mob violence will make the government's task infinitely more difficult, it will not be tolerated. We shall not defeat the Nazi evil by emulating its methods.

In 1943, after a drawn-out litigation process by Watch Tower Society lawyers in state courts and lower federal courts, the Supreme Court reversed its previous decision, ruling that public school officials could not force Jehovah's Witnesses and other students to salute the flag and recite the Pledge of Allegiance.

== See also ==
- Jehovah's Witnesses in Canada
- Jehovah's Witnesses and governments
- United States Supreme Court cases involving Jehovah's Witnesses

== Sources ==
- Rogerson, Alan (1969). Millions Now Living Will Never Die. London: Constable & Co. ISBN 978-0094559400.
- Botting, Gary (1993). Fundamental Freedoms and Jehovah's Witnesses. University of Calgary Press. ISBN 978-1-895176-06-3.
- Chryssides, George D. (2022). Jehovah's Witnesses: A New Introduction. Bloomsbury Academic. ISBN 978-1-3501-9089-4.
