= Jehovah's Witnesses by country =

Countries where Jehovah's Witnesses' activities are banned

Jehovah's Witnesses is a Christian denomination that is an outgrowth of the Bible student movement founded by Charles Taze Russell in the nineteenth century. Evangelism is a significant part of their beliefs and the religious group has established itself in several countries.

== Background ==
Jehovah's Witnesses believe that God's kingdom is a literal government in heaven, ruled by Jesus Christ and 144,000 "spirit-anointed" Christians drawn from the earth, which they associate with Jesus' reference to a "new covenant". The kingdom is viewed as the means by which God will accomplish his original purpose for the earth, transforming it into a paradise without sickness or death. It is said to have been the focal point of Jesus' ministry on earth. They believe the kingdom was established in heaven in 1914, and that Jehovah's Witnesses serve as the kingdom's representatives on earth.

Due to their belief in God's kingdom as the only legitimate form of governance, Jehovah's Witnesses do not participate in political activities, such as voting in elections. They refrain from saluting the flag of any country or singing nationalistic songs, which they believe are forms of worship. They refuse to participate in military service—even when it is compulsory. Witnesses are taught that they should obey the laws of the governments where they live unless such laws conflict with their beliefs, such as operating covertly in countries where their activities are banned. Their policies for handling cases of child sexual abuse have been the subject of various formal inquiries.

== Persecution ==
The beliefs and practices of Jehovah's Witnesses have engendered controversy throughout their history. Consequently, the denomination has been opposed by local governments, communities, and religious groups. Many Christian denominations consider the interpretations and doctrines of Jehovah's Witnesses heretical, and some professors of religion have classified the denomination as a cult.

According to law professor Archibald Cox, Jehovah's Witnesses in the United States were "the principal victims of religious persecution … they began to attract attention and provoke repression in the 1930s, when their proselytizing and numbers rapidly increased." At times, political and religious animosity against Jehovah's Witnesses has led to mob action and governmental repression in various countries including the United States, Canada and Nazi Germany.

During World War II, Jehovah's Witnesses were targeted in the United States, Canada, and many other countries because they refused to serve in the military or contribute to the war effort due to their doctrine of political neutrality. In Canada, Jehovah's Witnesses were interned in camps along with political dissidents and people of Japanese descent.

Jehovah's Witness members have been imprisoned in many countries for their refusal of conscription or compulsory military service. Their religious activities are banned or restricted in some countries, including Singapore, North Korea, China, Vietnam, Russia, and many Middle Eastern and North African countries.

== North America ==
=== Canada ===
In the early 1900s, radio stations were operated by congregations in Saskatoon, Edmonton, Vancouver, and Toronto. In 1927, the federal government minister responsible for radio licensing, Arthur Cardin, revoked the licenses for these radio stations because they shared airspace with the Ku Klux Klan in Canada. According to Gary Botting, this "strange alliance" was formed due to a mutual opposition against the Roman Catholic church. In response, Rutherford bought airtime from other radio stations. When Hector Charlesworth, then the chair of the Canadian Radio Broadcasting Commission, banned this activity as well, he was "indirectly attacked" in an issue of the Golden Age and Jehovah's Witnesses launched a petition to regain their licenses that resulted in 406,270 signatures. Charlesworth's actions were debated by the House of Commons in 1933. While multiple members expressed concern that this prohibition was censorship of free speech, the ban was not lifted.

In 1940, a year after Canada entered World War II, the denomination itself was banned under the War Measures Act as a subversive organization. This ban continued until 1943. A separate ban on the Watchtower Bible and Tract Society was not lifted until 1945. More than 100,000 dollars in assets were seized by the Canadian government and tonnes of literature produced by the group were confiscated. Hundreds of adherents were prosecuted as members of an illegal organization. Jehovah's Witnesses were interned in camps along with political dissidents and people of Chinese and Japanese descent. During this period, many Jehovah's Witness children were expelled from school, while others were placed in foster homes or juvenile detention. After the ban was lifted, men who had been jailed tried to apply for the ordained minister exemption of the National Selective Service Mobilization Regulations without success. This led to a legal case being filed, R. v. Stewart, which ruled that Jehovah's Witnesses were participants in a "commercial undertaking" and did not qualify as ministers. A similar outcome was reached in Greenlees v. A.G. Canada, where the judge decided that Jehovah's Witnesses could not be ministers because they considered every member to be one and that they did not have an organizational structure independent of the Watchtower Bible and Tract Society.

Jehovah's Witnesses faced discrimination in Quebec until the Quiet Revolution, including bans on distributing literature or holding meetings. Roncarelli v Duplessis was a 1959 legal case heard by the Supreme Court of Canada. The court held that in 1946 Maurice Duplessis, Premier and Attorney General of Quebec, had overstepped his authority by ordering the manager of the Liquor Commission to revoke the liquor licence of Frank Roncarelli, a Montreal restaurant owner and Jehovah's Witness who was an outspoken critic of the Roman Catholic Church in Quebec. Roncarelli provided bail for Jehovah's Witnesses arrested for distributing pamphlets attacking the Roman Catholic Church. The Supreme Court found Duplessis liable for $33,000 in damages plus Roncarelli's court costs. Another legal case heard that year was Lamb v Benoit, where a Jehovah's Witness woman was arrested for distributing religious pamphlets.

In 1984, Canada released a number of previously classified documents which revealed that in the 1940s, "able bodied young Jehovah's Witnesses" were sent to "camps", and "entire families who practiced the religion were imprisoned". The 1984 report stated, "Recently declassified wartime documents suggest [World War II] was also a time of officially sanctioned religious bigotry, political intolerance and the suppression of ideas. The federal government described Jehovah's Witnesses as subversive and offensive 'religious zealots' … in secret reports given to special parliamentarian committees in 1942." It concluded that, "probably no other organization is so offensive in its methods, working as it does under the guise of Christianity. The documents prepared by the justice department were presented to a special House of Commons committee by the government of William Lyon Mackenzie King in an attempt to justify the outlawing of the organizations during the second world war."

=== United States ===
The persecution of Jehovah's Witnesses for their refusal to salute the flag became known as the "Flag-Salute Cases". Their refusal to salute the flag became considered as a test of the liberties for which the flag stands, namely the freedom to worship according to the dictates of one's own conscience. The Supreme Court found that the United States, by making the flag salute compulsory in Minersville School District v. Gobitis (1940), was impinging upon the individual's right to worship as one chooses—a violation of the First Amendment Free Exercise Clause in the constitution. However, Justice Frankfurter, speaking on behalf of the 8-to-1 majority view against the Witnesses, stated that the interests of "inculcating patriotism was of sufficient importance to justify a relatively minor infringement on religious belief". The ruling resulted in a wave of persecution. Lillian Gobitas, one of the schoolchildren involved in the decision, said, "It was like open season on Jehovah's Witnesses."

The American Civil Liberties Union reported that by the end of 1940, "more than 1,500 Witnesses in the United States had been victimized in 335 separate attacks". Such attacks included beatings, being tarred and feathered, hanged, shot, maimed, and even castrated. As reports of attacks against Jehovah's Witnesses continued, "several justices changed their minds, and in West Virginia State Board of Education v. Barnette (1943), the Court declared that the state could not impinge on the First Amendment by compelling the observance of rituals."

In 1943, after a drawn-out litigation process by the Watch Tower Society in state courts and lower federal courts, the Supreme Court ruled that public school officials could not force Jehovah's Witnesses and other students to salute the flag and recite the Pledge of Allegiance. In 1946 and 1953 Supreme Court decisions were handed down establishing their right to be exempted from military service.

Legal challenges by Jehovah's Witnesses prompted a series of state and federal court rulings that reinforced judicial protections for civil liberties. Among the rights strengthened by Witness court victories in the US are the protection of religious conduct from federal and state interference, the right to abstain from patriotic rituals and military service, the right of patients to refuse medical treatment, and the right to engage in public discourse.

Authors including William Whalen, Shawn Francis Peters and former members Barbara Grizzuti Harrison, Alan Rogerson, and William Schnell have claimed that a series of arrests of Witnesses and mob violence against them in the 1930s and 1940s were the consequence of what appeared to be a deliberate course of provocation of authorities and other religious groups by Witness leaders. Harrison, Schnell, and Whalen stated that Jehovah's Witness leader Joseph Franklin Rutherford invited and cultivated opposition for publicity purposes in a bid to attract dispossessed members of society, and to convince members that persecution by the outside world was evidence of the truth of their struggle to serve God.

In 1943, the Supreme Court ruled in West Virginia State Board of Education v. Barnette that requiring students to salute the flag was a violation of their First Amendment rights.

Many United States Supreme Court cases involving Jehovah's Witnesses have shaped First Amendment law. Significant cases affirmed rights such as these:

- Right to Refrain from Compulsory Flag Salute – West Virginia State Board of Education vs. Barnette
- Conscientious objection to military service
- Preaching in public

By 1988, the U.S. Supreme Court had reviewed 71 cases involving Jehovah's Witnesses as an organization, two-thirds of which were decided in their favor. In 2002, the Watchtower Bible and Tract Society disputed an ordinance in Stratton, Ohio that required a permit in order to preach from door to door. The Supreme Court decided in favor of the Witnesses.

=== Cuba ===
During the Cuban Revolution and its aftermath, Jehovah's Witnesses became one of the largest religious groups in Cuba. Despite initially cordial relations with the government, led by Fidel Castro, attempts made to suppress religious groups became apparent. In 1962, the Cuban Ministry of Communications imposed restrictions on the distribution of Jehovah's Witnesses' literature. According to the 1963 Witness Yearbook, arrests for preaching increased in 1962. The following year, foreign missionaries were exiled and hundreds of Jehovah's Witnesses were arrested for holding public and private gatherings without permission from local authorities. In 1965, the Cuban government banned the Cuban Watch Tower Society. This marked the beginning of heightened hostility towards Jehovah's Witnesses, who began to face legal repercussions for refusing to salute the flag or serve in the military when conscripted. Military Units to Aid Production were established by the government to isolate groups deemed to be "deviant" or "undesirable", including Jehovah's Witnesses. Those who refused military conscription were typically sentenced to one to six years in these camps. A 1966 report documented instances of torture and murder of Witnesses by the government agents who worked at these camps. The Cuban government officially banned the group on July 1, 1974. The 1976 Constitution reaffirmed the ruling.

Under Fidel Castro's communist regime, Jehovah's Witnesses were included among groups considered to be "social deviants" and were sent to forced labor concentration camps to be "reeducated". On July 1, 1974 the group was officially banned and their places of worship closed. Following the ban, members who refused military service were imprisoned for three years; it was reported that members were also imprisoned because of their children's refusal to salute the flag.

== Asia ==
=== China ===
Jehovah's Witnesses are banned in China. Former Canadian-American Jehovah's Witness missionary Amber Scorah and others were sent there to preach clandestinely. Scorah recounted the lengths to which she and her husband went to preach illegally in China in the early 2000s. She describes how local Jehovah's Witnesses met secretly in a different location every week, with invites by word-of-mouth only. She also describes how they would vet potential converts who might report them to authorities.

=== India ===
Jehovah's Witnesses' Office of Public Information has documented a number of mob attacks in India. It states that these instances of violence "reveal the country's hostility toward its own citizens who are Christians." There have been reports that police assist mob attacks on Jehovah's Witnesses or lay charges against the them while failing to charge other participants involved.

In Davangere on December 20, 2010 a mob confronted two female Witnesses. The mob broke into the home of one of the Witnesses where they had taken refuge. Property was damaged and one of the Witnesses was assaulted. When the police arrived, the Witnesses were arrested and charged with blasphemy. In another incident on December 6, 2011, three Witnesses were attacked by a mob in Madikeri. The male Witness "was kicked and pummeled by the mob" and then dragged towards a nearby temple; while making lewd remarks, the mob "tried to tear the clothes off of the female Witnesses". According to the Watch Tower Society, the police "took the three Witnesses to the police station and filed charges against them rather than the mob". During a July 2012 incident, a group of fifteen men assaulted four Witnesses in Madikeri. The group was taken to a police station and charged with "insulting the religion or religious beliefs of another class" before being released on bail.

In October 2023, a bomb blast at a Jehovah's Witnesses annual convention in Kerala killed 7 people and injured 50 others. The suspect claimed to be a disillusioned member of the Jehovah's Witnesses, and said he resented the Witnesses' anti-national doctrines.

=== Japan ===
In Japan, following the publication of Shūkyō nisei-related guidelines, a survey was conducted about child abuse within Jehovah's Witnesses, the results of which were forwarded to the government. Ninety-two percent of 583 respondents reported that they had experienced physical abuse as children. The lawyer's group conducting the survey believed this to be evidence of systemic religious abuse.

=== Kazakhstan ===
Jehovah's Witnesses' activities in Kazakhstan were banned until 1997. After the ban was lifted, members continued to experience police disruption and imprisonment. Their activities are currently registered only in some regions of Kazakhstan, and the Watch Tower Society reports that the use of their literature is restricted.

=== Philippines ===
In 1990, 68 Jehovah’s Witness elementary students were expelled for refusing to participate in daily flag-raising ceremonies. In Ebralinag, et al. vs. Division Superintendent of Schools of Cebu, the court ruled that Jehovah's Witnesses are permitted to refrain from saluting the Philippine flag and singing the national anthem. In 1993, the Supreme Court upheld the decision in favor of the denomination.

=== Singapore ===
During British colonial rule in 1941, Watch Tower Society literature was banned in Singapore due to Jehovah's Witnesses' continued refusal to enlist in the Allied Forces during World War II. The group was officially registered as a society in 1960 under the Societies Ordinance Act of 1890. While freedom of religion is constitutionally protected in post-independence Singapore, Jehovah's Witnesses continue to face restrictions, especially where conscription is concerned. In 1972, the group was deregistered for being "prejudicial to public welfare and order", with their refusal of mandatory military service cited as a key concern. Since then, male adherents who reject enlistment, typically about six individuals each year, are imprisoned under the Enlistment Act 1970 as conscientious objection is not recognized. However, they do not receive permanent criminal records, and are usually assigned tasks such as cooking, gardening and laundry in lieu of military activities for about two years.

In 1972, the Singapore government deregistered and banned the activities of Jehovah's Witnesses on the grounds that its members refuse to perform military service (which is obligatory for all male citizens), salute the flag, or swear oaths of allegiance to the state. Literature published by the denomination was also banned, and a person in possession of the banned literature may be fined up to S$2,000 (US$1,333) and jailed up to 12 months for a first conviction.

In 1994, the High Court of Singapore ruled on the case of Chan Hiang Leng Colin v Public Prosecutor, finding that banning the Jehovah's Witnesses did not violate the right to freedom of religion guaranteed by Article 15(1) of the Constitution of Singapore. According to the ruling by Chief Justice Yong Pung How, their refusal to perform military service was contrary to public peace, welfare and good order, and laws relating to public order are exceptions to freedom of religion set out in Article 15(4).

In February 1995, Singapore police raided private homes where members of the denomination were holding religious meetings, in an operation codenamed "Operation Hope". Officers seized Bibles, religious literature, documents and computers, and eventually brought charges against 69 Jehovah's Witnesses, many of whom went to jail. In March 1995, 74-year-old Yu Nguk Ding was arrested for carrying two "undesirable publications"—one of them a Bible printed by the Watch Tower Society.

In 1996, eighteen Jehovah's Witnesses were convicted for unlawfully meeting in a Singapore apartment and were given sentences from one to four weeks in jail. Canadian Queen's Counsel Glen How argued that the restrictions against the Jehovah's Witnesses violated their constitutional rights. Then-Chief Justice Yong Pung How questioned How's sanity, accused him of "living in a cartoon world" and referred to "funny, cranky religious groups" before denying the appeal. In 1998, two Jehovah's Witnesses were charged in a Singapore court for possessing and distributing banned religious publications.

In 1998, a Jehovah's Witness lost a lawsuit against a government school for wrongful dismissal for refusing to sing the national anthem or salute the flag. In March 1999, the Court of Appeals denied his appeal. In 2000, public secondary schools indefinitely suspended at least fifteen Jehovah's Witness students for refusing to sing the national anthem or participate in the flag ceremony. In April 2001, one public school teacher, also a member of Jehovah's Witnesses, resigned after being threatened with dismissal for refusing to participate in singing the national anthem.

Singapore authorities have seized Jehovah's Witnesses' literature on various occasions from individuals attempting to cross the Malaysia–Singapore border. In thirteen cases, authorities warned the Jehovah's Witnesses but did not press charges.

The initial sentence for failure to comply is 15 months' imprisonment, with an additional 24 months for a second refusal. Failure to perform annual military reserve duty, which is required of all those who have completed their initial two-year obligation, results in a 40-day sentence, with a 12-month sentence after four refusals.

=== South Korea ===
South Korea did not have a religious exemption for military service until 2018, which led to more than 19,000 Jehovah's Witnesses being imprisoned there.

=== Turkmenistan ===
The United Nations Human Rights Committee has indicated that Jehovah's Witnesses in Turkmenistan have been prosecuted and imprisoned for refusing to perform compulsory military service, despite Turkmenistan's constitution guaranteeing the right to "practice any religion alone or in association with others" and the right to "freedom of conviction and the free expression of those convictions". The UN committee noted, "The State party should take all necessary measures to review its legislation with a view to providing for alternative military service. The State party should also ensure that the law clearly stipulates that individuals have the right to conscientious objection to military service. Furthermore, the State party should halt all prosecutions of individuals who refuse to perform military service on grounds of conscience and release those individuals who are currently serving prison sentences." In May 2021, the Watch Tower Society reported that Turkmenistan has released all Jehovah's Witnesses who had been imprisoned for conscientious objection to military service.

According to the US Department of State, Turkmenistan's Ministry of Justice described Jehovah's Witnesses as foreign and dangerous. The US State Department also stated that the Turkmenistan government imposes restrictions on the freedom of Jehovah's Witness parents (and members of various other religious groups) to raise their children in accordance with their religious beliefs. In 2003, Jehovah's Witnesses' religious literature was confiscated, members of the denomination were denied exit visas, and others were stopped after crossing a border and forced to return. In 2004, five Jehovah's Witnesses were stopped and prevented from boarding a flight to another country because their names were included on a "black list" of citizens prohibited from leaving the country. In 2015, a Jehovah's Witness in Turkmenistan was sentenced to four years in prison for allegedly inciting hatred at a religious meeting held in a private home, and other attendees were fined.

== Europe ==
=== Austria ===
In the period between 1978 and 2004, Jehovah's Witnesses sought registration as a religious society under the 1874 law, which they were repeatedly prevented from doing by state institutions for various reasons. The ECHR ruled in 2008 that Austria had thus violated Articles 9, 14, 6 and 13 of the Convention on Human Rights.

=== Bulgaria ===
In Bulgaria, Jehovah's Witnesses have been targets of violence by right-wing nationalist groups such as the VMRO – Bulgarian National Movement. On April 17, 2011, a group of about sixty hooded men besieged a Kingdom Hall in Burgas, during the annual memorial of Christ's death. Attackers threw stones, damaged furniture, and injured at least five of the people gathered inside. The incident was recorded by a local television station. Jehovah's Witnesses in Bulgaria have been fined for proselytizing without proper government permits, and some municipalities have legislation prohibiting or restricting their rights to preach.

=== France ===
Prior to World War II, the French government banned the Association of Jehovah's Witnesses in France, and ordered that the French offices of the Watch Tower Bible and Tract Society be vacated. (Note: "The Organization is Banned In mid-October 1939, about six weeks after the beginning of the war, the organization of Jehovah's Witnesses was banned in France.")

Jehovah's Witnesses were officially registered as a religious group in France in 1947. In December 1952, France's Minister of the Interior banned The Watchtower magazine, citing its position on military service. The ban was lifted on November 26, 1974.

In the 1990s and 2000s, the French government included Jehovah's Witnesses on its list of "cults". Despite a century of activity in the country, France's Ministry of Finance opposed official recognition of the denomination; it was not until June 23, 2000 that France's highest administrative court, the Council of State, ruled that Jehovah's Witnesses qualify as a religion under French law. France's Ministry of the Interior sought to collect 60% of donations made to the denomination's entities; Witnesses called the taxation "confiscatory" and appealed to the European Court of Human Rights. (Note: "Jehovah's Witnesses awaited a ruling by the ECHR on the admissibility of a case contesting the government's assessment of their donations at a 60 percent tax rate. The government had imposed the high rate relative to other religious groups after ruling the group to be a harmful cult. If the assessed tax, which totaled more than 57 million euros (approximately $77.5 million) as of year's end, were to be paid, it would consume all of the group's buildings and assets in the country.") (Note: "France's highest court of appeal, the Cour de cassation, has handed down its decision in a case between the Association Les Témoins de Jéhovah, a not-for-profit religious association used by Jehovah's Witnesses in France, and the national tax department, the Direction des services fiscaux. Following a tax inspection lasting 18 months, the tax department established that Association Les Témoins de Jéhovah, whose sole revenue consists of religious donations by its adherents, was run in a completely benevolent fashion, and that its activities were not commercial or for profit. Nevertheless, the tax department levied a 60-percent tax on the religious donations made over a period of four years, between 1993 and 1996. … This is the first time in their 100-year existence in France that Jehovah's Witnesses have been taxed in this manner. … Furthermore, this tax has not been imposed on any other religious organization in France. The Association Les Témoins de Jéhovah has decided to institute proceedings against this confiscatory taxation before the European Court of Human Rights.") On June 30, 2011, the European Court of Human Rights ruled that France's actions violated the religious freedom of Jehovah's Witnesses.

In 1995, they were designated as a "dangerous sect" by French law. In 1999, the country demanded back taxes on donations to the religious group's organization from 1993 and 1996, which would have been €57.5 million. This tax ruling was overturned by the European Court of Human Rights on June 30, 2011.

In Association Les Témoins de Jéhovah v. Direction des Services Fiscaux challenged the denial of tax-exempt status for Association Les Témoins de Jéhovah, the not-for-profit corporation used by Jehovah's Witnesses in France. Religious associations (“associations cultuelles”, the legal status defined by the 1905 law on the Separation of the Churches and the State) in France can request exemption from certain taxes, including taxes on donations, if their purpose is solely to organize religious worship and they do not infringe on public order. According to the French tax administration, tax-exempt status was denied because:

The association of Jehovah's Witnesses forbids its members to defend the nation, to take part in public life, to give blood transfusions to their minor children and that the parliamentary commission on cults has listed them as a cult which can disturb public order.

On October 5, 2004, the Court of Cassation—the highest court in France for cases outside of administrative law—rejected the Witnesses' recourse against taxation at 60% of the value of some of their contributions, which the fiscal services assimilated to a legal category of donations close to that of inheritance and subject to the same taxes between non-parents. In the case of two local associations of Jehovah's Witnesses, the Council of State, the supreme court for administrative matters, ruled that denying the legal status of associations cultuelles on grounds of accusations of infringement of public order was illegal unless substantiated by actual proofs of that infringement.

On June 30, 2011, the European Court of Human Rights (ECHR) unanimously ruled that France's imposing a retroactive tax for the years 1993 and 1996 had violated Jehovah's Witnesses' right to freedom of religion under Article 9 of the European Convention on Human Rights. On July 5, 2012, the ECHR ordered the government of France to repay €4,590,295 in taxes, plus interest, and to reimburse legal costs of €55,000. On December 11, 2012, the government of France repaid €6,373,987.31 ($8,294,320).

Other court cases have concerned the rights for patients, or of minor patients' legal guardians, to refuse medical treatment even if there is a risk of death. For example, in a 2001 case, doctors at a French public hospital who gave blood products to a patient with an acute kidney injury were found not to have committed a mistake of a nature to involve the responsibility of the State. The Council stated that "there does not exist, for the doctor, an abstract and unalterable hierarchy between the obligation to treat the patient, and that to respect the will of the patient," concluding that faced with a decision to treat patients against their will, doctors do not have a legally predefined obligation to treat the patient, nor do they have a legally predefined obligation to abide by their wishes. One year later, after the adoption of the Kouchner Law on patients' rights and quality of the health system, the Council of State recalled that not respecting the patient's wishes violates his individual freedom, but the doctor did not commit a fault if under extreme conditions he performs an intervention "necessary and proportionate to its state" in order to try to save the patient's life.

In a child custody case following a divorce, a woman was denied custody of her children outside of holidays for various reasons, including her membership of Jehovah's Witnesses; the court of appeals of Nîmes considered that the educational rules applied by the Witnesses to their children were essentially inappropriate because of their hardness, their intolerance, and the obligation for children to practice proselytism. The case went before the ECHR, which ruled that the court should have based its decision on the mother's actual handling of her children and not on abstract, general notions pertaining to the mother's religious affiliation. Following a lengthy administrative procedure initiated by Jehovah's Witnesses, on October 16, 2013, the Council of State condemned the refusals of the French administration to accept their religious ministers as prison chaplains, explaining that the detainees "may exercise the religion of their choice, in accordance with the suitable conditions for organising the premises, within solely the limits imposed by security and good order in the institution". According to the French Ministry of Justice, Jehovah's Witnesses currently have 111 chaplains for their own service in prison.

Jehovah's Witnesses in France have reported hundreds of criminal attacks against their adherents and places of worship. (Note: "According to representatives for the Jehovah's Witnesses community, there were 65 acts of vandalism against the group in the country through December including Molotov cocktails aimed at Jehovah's Witnesses' property. … According to the leaders of the Jehovah's Witnesses community in the country, there were 98 acts against individuals for 2006 and 115 acts in 2007.")

==== French dependencies ====
During the ban of The Watchtower in France, publication of the magazine continued in various French territories. In French Polynesia, the magazine was covertly published under the name, La Sentinelle, though it was later learned that The Watchtower had not been banned locally. In Réunion, the magazine was published under the name, Bulletin intérieur.

=== Georgia ===
In 1996, a year after Georgia adopted its post-USSR Constitution, the country's Ministry of Internal Affairs began a campaign to confiscate religious literature belonging to Jehovah's Witnesses. Individual Witnesses fled Georgia seeking religious refugee status in other nations. Government officials refused permits for Jehovah's Witnesses to organize assemblies, and law enforcement officials dispersed legal assemblies. In September 2000, "Georgian police and security officials fired blank anti-tank shells and used force to disperse an outdoor gathering of some 700 Jehovah's Witnesses in the town of Natuliki in northwestern Georgia on 8 September, AP and Caucasus Press reported." In 2002, prosecution of a priest who instigated violence against Jehovah's Witness members was impeded by a lack of cooperation by government and law enforcement.

In 2004, Forum 18 referred to the period since 1999 as a "five-year reign of terror" against Jehovah's Witnesses and other religious minorities. Amnesty International noted: "Jehovah's Witnesses have frequently been a target for violence … in Georgia … In many of the incidents police are said to have failed to protect the believers, or even to have participated in physical and verbal abuse."

On May 3, 2007, the European Court of Human Rights ruled against the government of Georgia for its toleration of religious violence toward Jehovah's Witnesses and ordered the victims be compensated for moral damages and legal costs. On October 7, 2014, the European Court of Human Rights, giving its judgement concerning violence against Jehovah's Witnesses in Georgia in the years 2000–2001, unanimously held that Georgia's state officials, in violation of Articles 3, 9 & 14 of the European Convention on Human Rights, had either directly participated in those attacks or had tolerated violence by private individuals against members of the religious group.

==== South Ossetia ====
In July 2017, the Supreme Court of South Ossetia ruled that Jehovah's Witnesses were an extreme organization. The court declared a penalty of ten years' imprisonment for "any religious activities such as assembly and distributing literature".

=== Germany ===
During 1931 and 1932, more than 2000 legal actions were instigated against Jehovah's Witnesses in Germany and members of the group were dismissed from employment. Persecution intensified following Adolf Hitler's appointment as chancellor in 1933 and continued until 1945. A "Declaration of Facts" was issued at a Jehovah's Witness convention in Berlin on June 25, 1933, asserting the group's political neutrality and calling for an end to government opposition. More than 2.1 million copies of the statement were distributed throughout Germany, but its distribution prompted a new wave of persecution against members of the denomination in Germany, whose refusal to give the Nazi salute, join Nazi organizations or perform military service demonstrated their opposition to the totalitarian ideology of National Socialism.

On October 4, 1934, congregations of Jehovah's Witnesses in Germany sent telegrams of protest and warning to Hitler. The Watch Tower Society reported that according to Karl R. A. Wittig, a government officer in Germany at the time, Hitler was shown a number of telegrams protesting the Third Reich's persecution of the Bible Students. Wittig reported: "Hitler jumped to his feet and with clenched fists hysterically screamed: 'This brood will be exterminated in Germany!' Four years after this discussion I was able, by my own observations, to convince myself … that Hitler's outburst of anger was not just an idle threat. No other group of prisoners of the named concentration-camps was exposed to the sadism of the SS-soldiery in such a fashion as the Bible Students were. It was a sadism marked by an unending chain of physical and mental tortures, the likes of which no language in the world can express."

About 10,000 Witnesses were imprisoned, including 2000 sent to concentration camps, where they were identified by purple triangles; as many as 1200 died, including 250 who were executed. From 1935 Gestapo officers offered members a document to sign indicating renouncement of their faith, submission to state authority, and support of the German military. Historian Detlef Garbe says a "relatively high number" of people signed the statement before the war, but "extremely low numbers" of Bible Student prisoners did so in concentration camps in later years.

After a short, unstable period after WWII, the Witnesses continued to suffer severe persecution in the German Democratic Republic (GDR). The Potsdam Agreement of 1945 guaranteed religious freedom and respect for organizations, which also applied to East Germany. When the GDR was established in 1949, the Constitution of East Germany included similar guarantees for the practice of religion. However it became clear that these promises were symbolic and had little impact on the ruling authorities' policies. The government restricted the activities of the Protestant and Catholic Churches and banned several smaller religious groups. The Jehovah's Witnesses were subject to the harshest and most prolonged persecution. According to the official Jehovah's Witnesses webpage,

"Congregation meetings were again broken up by the police. Literature was confiscated. Roads were blockaded to prevent the Witnesses from attending a convention. Brothers were arrested. On August 31, 1950, an official ban was imposed. The Witnesses in East Germany were again forced underground, this time by a Communist regime, not to emerge until almost 40 years later."

According to Mike Dennis, the main agent of "control surveillance and persecution was the Ministry of State Security, popularly known as the Stasi." Its "mission was to serve as the shield and sword of the SED and to protect the socialist system and the East German state from internal and external threats, especially by uncovering and forestalling 'the hostile plans of the aggressive imperialists and their helpers." The Jehovah's Witness website says that in total almost 5,000 Witnesses were imprisoned in 231 places. Hans-Hermann Dirksen mentions that there were many reasons why this group was persecuted, but primarily because the German Democratic Republic saw their religious activities as "detrimental to their political activities." Because the group remained neutral, the SED saw the group as "dangerous and among the enemies of socialism." Trials were conducted against the Witnesses because their activities "were deemed as unconstitutional and their investigations proved they were disguised as espionage." The Stasi then proceeded to use new methods to create insecurity within the organization by infiltrating the group in the 1960s. Another reason they were persecuted was because the organization's headquarters were in the United States, an enemy of the GDR. The organization remained faithful and continued its service throughout the decades of persecution. It was their "solidarity as a community which enabled them to withstand, often with great stoicism, decomposition and liquidation measures."

In East Germany, from the 1950s to the 1980s, Jehovah's Witnesses were persecuted extensively by the Stasi, which frequently used decomposition methods against them. Jehovah's Witnesses were considered a threat because their beliefs did not conform to socialist standards and their members sometimes had contact with the West.

Despite more than a century of conspicuous activity in the country, Jehovah's Witnesses in Germany were not granted legal recognition until March 25, 2005, in Berlin; (Note: "A Berlin court ruled on Thursday that Jehovah's Witnesses are entitled to the same privileges enjoyed by Germany's major Catholic and Protestant churches, ending a 15-year legal fight about the group's status.") in 2006 Germany's Federal Administrative Court in Leipzig extended the local decision to apply nationwide.

=== Greece ===
Greece had a ban on public evangelism in the 1930s. Approximately 60 Jehovah's Witnesses were imprisoned for violating this law. The case was eventually appealed to the European Court of Human Rights, who ruled in favour of Jehovah's Witnesses in 1993. This decision also benefited other religious groups in the country.

=== Norway ===
Norway provides state subsidies to religious communities, with some restrictions, and Jehovah's Witnesses qualified for the subsidy for more than thirty years. In 2022, Valgerd Svarstad Haugland, the couny governor of Oslo and Viken revoked the registration of the group due to their practice of shunning. The decision was appealed and upheld by the Ministry of Children and Families. In 2023, Jehovah's Witnesses were deregistered as a religious community in Norway, resulting in the loss of annual subsidies of €1.3 million. The deregistration also meant that the denomination lost the right to perform civil marriages. The director of Human Rights Without Frontiers stated that by deregistering Jehovah's Witnesses, Norway was interfering with the group's religious freedom.

A series of appeals followed. On March 4, 2024, the Oslo District Court upheld the deregistration. On March 14, 2025, the Borgarting Court of Appeal reversed the decision, and the state appealed to the Supreme Court of Norway. On April 29, 2026, the Supreme Court ruled that the deregistration and suspension of state grants was unlawful. The court stated that shunning does not violate the human rights of adult or minor ex-members, citing a lack of evidence and the practice of shunning in other religions. The final ruling was announced on April 30.

=== Russia ===
In April 1951, about 9,300 Jehovah's Witnesses in the Soviet Union were deported to Siberia as part of Operation North.

In 2004, the Moscow City Court banned the activities of Jehovah's Witnesses in Moscow and their legal entity was liquidated. Russian anti-extremism laws were extended to non-violent groups in 2007 and Jehovah's Witnesses were banned in the port city of Taganrog in 2009 after a local court ruled that the organization was guilty of inciting religious hatred by "propagating the exclusivity and supremacy" of their religious beliefs. In December 2009, the Supreme Court of Russia upheld the ruling of the lower courts which pronounced 34 pieces of Jehovah's Witness literature extremist, such as their magazine The Watchtower. The ruling upheld the confiscation of property of Jehovah's Witnesses in Taganrog. In December 2015, a Rostov Regional Court convicted 16 Jehovah's Witnesses of practicing extremism in Taganrog, with five given 5 1/2-year suspended sentences and the remainder were issued fines they were not required to pay.

In July 2015, the Russian Federation Ministry of Justice added Jehovah's Witnesses' official website to the Federal List of Extremist Materials, making it a criminal offense to promote the website from within the country and requiring internet providers throughout Russia to block access to the site. In March 2017, the Russian News Agency TASS reported that Russia's Justice Ministry had suspended the activities of the Administrative Center of Jehovah's Witnesses in Russia due to extremist activities. In April 2017, UN Special Rapporteur on Freedom of Opinion and Expression David Kaye, UN Special Rapporteur on Freedoms of Peaceful Assembly and Association Maina Kiai, and UN Special Rapporteur on Freedom of Religion and Belief Ahmed Shaheed condemned Russia's desire to ban Jehovah's Witnesses.

On April 20, 2017, The Supreme Court of Russia issued a verdict upholding the claim from the country's Justice Ministry that Jehovah's Witnesses' activity violated laws on "extremism". The ruling liquidated the group's Russian headquarters in Saint Petersburg and all of its 395 local religious organizations, banning their activity and ordering their property to be seized by the state. According to the human rights organization Forum 18, this is the first time a court has ruled a registered national centralized religious organization as "extremist". Many countries and international organizations have spoken out against Russia's religious abuses of Jehovah's Witnesses. Leaders of various denominations have also spoken out against Russia's decision to ban the denomination. An article in Newsweek stated, "Russia's decision to ban Jehovah's Witnesses in the country shows the 'paranoia' of Vladimir Putin's government, according to the chair of the United States Commission on International Religious Freedom (USCIRF)." The United States Holocaust Memorial Museum also expressed deep concern over Russia's treatment of Jehovah's Witnesses.

In May 2017, armed Federal Security Services (FSB) officers arrested Dennis Christensen, a 46-year-old Danish citizen, at a hall in Oryol on charges related to extremism. On February 6, 2019, he was found guilty and sentenced to six years in prison.

A 2019 arrest in Surgut of a Jehovah's Witness has been alleged to involve torture.

In February 2021, a Russian court in the Republic of Khakassia sentenced 69-year-old Valentina Baranovskaya to two years in prison for taking part in religious activities that have been banned in Russia. She is the first female member of the denomination to be imprisoned in Russia since their activities were banned in 2017. Her 46-year-old son Roman Baranovsky was also sentenced to six years in prison. According to the Watch Tower Society, the Supreme Court denied their appeal on May 24, 2021, and added restrictions to be imposed on them after their release. Commenting on the sentence, the USCIRF tweeted that the sentencing of an elderly woman in poor health marks a "new low in Russia's brutal campaign against religious freedom."

In October 2022, three Jehovah's Witnesses were sentenced to six years in prison in Sevastopol after the Ukrainian city was annexed by Russia in 2014. Although the denomination's activities are legal in Ukraine, the decision was made by "a Moscow-imposed court" that found them guilty of organizing activities for Jehovah's Witnesses.

=== Soviet Union ===
Jehovah's Witnesses did not have a significant presence in the Soviet Union prior to 1939 when the Soviet Union incorporated eastern Romania, Moldavia, and Lithuania, each of which had a Jehovah's Witness movement. Although never large in number (estimated by the KGB to be 20,000 in 1968), the Jehovah's Witnesses became one of the most persecuted religious groups in the Soviet Union during the post-World War II era. Members were arrested or deported, and some were put in labor camps. Witnesses in Moldavian SSR were deported to Tomsk Oblast; members from other regions of the Soviet Union were deported to Irkutsk Oblast. KGB officials, who were tasked with dissolving the Jehovah's Witness movement, were disturbed to discover that the Witnesses continued to practice their faith even within the labor camps.

The Minister of Internal Affairs, Viktor Semyonovich Abakumov proposed the deportation of the Jehovah's Witnesses to Stalin in October 1950. A resolution was voted by the Council of Minister and an order was issued by the Ministry for State Security in March 1951. The Moldavian SSR passed a decree "on the confiscation and selling of the property of individuals banished from the territory of the Moldavian SSR", which included the Jehovah's Witnesses.

In April 1951, over 9,000 Jehovah's Witnesses were deported to Siberia under a plan called "Operation North". The Soviet government was so disturbed by the Jehovah's Witnesses who continued to receive religious literature smuggled from Brooklyn that the KGB was authorized to send agents to infiltrate the Brooklyn headquarters.

In September 1965, a decree of the Presidium of the USSR Council of Ministers canceled the "special settlement" restriction of Jehovah's Witnesses, though the decree, signed by Anastas Mikoyan, stated that there would be no compensation for confiscated property. However, Jehovah's Witnesses remained the subject of state persecution due to their ideology being classified as anti-Soviet.

=== Spain ===
In December 2023, a lawsuit filed by the Jehovah's Witnesses against the Spanish Association of Victims of Jehovah's Witnesses was dismissed. This lawsuit was filed because the religion considered that the association of victims included in its statutes "a series of offensive statements against the honor of Jehovah's Christian Witnesses and all its members". It also requested the elimination of the victims' association from the National Registry of Associations.

== Africa ==
=== Benin ===
During the first presidency of Mathieu Kérékou, activities of Jehovah's Witnesses were banned and members were forced to undergo "demystification training".

=== Eritrea ===
Religious groups must be registered in order to legally worship in Eritrea. Jehovah's Witnesses, as well as other Christian and Muslim groups, have been refused this legal recognition. Jehovah's Witnesses have been imprisoned for their refusal to perform military service and for attending religious services.

In Eritrea, the government stripped Jehovah's Witnesses of their civil and political rights in 1994 after their refusal to engage in voting and military service. Members of all ages have been arrested for participating in religious meetings. On 24 September 1994, three members were arrested and imprisoned without trial. International rights groups are aware of the situation of Jehovah's Witnesses in Eritrea and have repeatedly called for Eritrean authorities to end the persecution.

As of July 2016, 55 members were imprisoned. According to the Watch Tower Society, 28 members were released on December 4, 2020, and another four were released in early 2021.

=== Malawi ===
In 1967, thousands of Jehovah's Witnesses in Malawi were beaten and killed, houses and gathering places where burned along with their bibles and publications by police and citizens for refusing to purchase a card indicating endorsement of the Malawi Congress Party. While their political neutrality during the time of the old Colonial government was seen as an act of resistance, their continued non-involvement with the new independent government was viewed as treasonous. The organization was declared illegal and foreign members in the country were expelled. Persecution, both economic and physical, intensified after a September 1972 Malawi Congress Party meeting which stated that "all Witnesses should be dismissed from their employment; any firm that failed to comply would have its license cancelled". By November 1973, 21,000 Jehovah's Witnesses had fled to neighboring Zambia. In 1993, during the transition to a multiparty system and a change in leadership, the government's ban on the organization was lifted.

=== Rwanda ===
In 2005 the Presiding Judge of the Provincial Court in Ruhengeri, Rwanda ruled that Witnesses should not be imprisoned for refusing to bear arms in civil defense 'night patrols' since they were willing to participate and had participated in other forms of community service. 297 Witnesses had been imprisoned on such charges in an 8-month period in 2004. 143 of those imprisoned had been severely beaten.

=== South Africa ===
Beginning on June 7, 1967, the apartheid South African government passed the Defense Amendment Bill, making it compulsory for all white males of eligible age to participate in the armed forces. Conscription brought Jehovah's Witnesses into conflict with the government, and young men who refused military service were sentenced to no less than 12 months at a military detention barracks, with repeat convictions in some cases. According to the Survey of Race Relations in South Africa of 1974, during 1973, 158 Jehovah's Witnesses were sentenced "for refusing on religious grounds to render service or undergo training." In the first half of 1974, 120 Jehovah's Witnesses were sentenced. Conscription was officially ended in late August 1993. By this time, the Constitution of South Africa had been adjusted to allow for alternative civilian service instead of military service.

== Australia ==
In 1930, the Watch Tower Society had controlling interests in several radio stations in Australia, including 5KA, where presenters were told to preach and in 1931 began broadcasting sermons of Joseph Franklin Rutherford.

In 1931, the Australian government monitored radio broadcasts of Rutherford's sermons as they had received complaints about anti-Catholic rhetoric. In 1933, the Australian government banned Rutherford's sermons, which included diatribes against the Catholic Church and other Christian denominations, the British Empire, and the United States. The religious group became especially unpopular after 1940 due to their political neutrality in the second world war, prompting people to write to government officials about the names and addresses of known members.

In 1941, Jehovah's Witnesses became an illegal organization. Jehovah's Witnesses was declared an illegal organization on 17 January 1941, with World War II described as "an ideal opportunity to get rid of licensees long regarded as deviant". Various groups supported the ban, which caused political pressure to enforce it; Member of Parliament Maurice Blackburn opposed a ban, believing it to be caused by religious intolerance. Once the ban was enacted, the assets of the Watchtower Bible and Tract Society were seized by the government. Witness homes were raided to confiscate their religious literature. Despite these measures, Jehovah's Witnesses continued their activities. The ban was overturned in 1943 when the High Court concluded that these restrictions violated the constitution.

In 2015, the Royal Commission into Institutional Responses to Child Sexual Abuse examined the handling of child sexual abuse cases by Jehovah's Witnesses and other organizations in Australia. Their "case studies showed that it was a common practice of religious institutions to adopt 'in-house' responses when dealing with allegations of child sexual abuse." During the hearing, the Watch Tower Society had produced 5,000 documents relating to 1,006 case files of allegations of child sexual abuse reported to Jehovah's Witness elders in Australia since 1950—each file for a different alleged perpetrator of child sexual abuse, including 579 cases in which the perpetrator confessed. None of these allegations were reported to the secular authorities. Officers of the royal commission "referred information in relation to 514 alleged perpetrators to police", adding that "of the remaining 492 alleged perpetrators identified in the case files, officers at the Royal Commission determined that there was either insufficient evidence in the case files to warrant referring matters to police or that the matters had already come to the attention of police". The royal commission found that it "[did] not consider the Jehovah's Witness organisation to be an organisation which responds adequately to child sexual abuse. ... The organisation's retention and continued application of policies such as the two-witness rule in cases of child sexual abuse shows a serious lack of understanding of the nature of child sexual abuse." In its final report, the royal commission added, "As long as the Jehovah's Witness organisation continues to ... [rely on a literal interpretation of the Bible and 1st century principles to set practice, policy and procedure] ... in its response to allegations of child sexual abuse, it will remain an organisation that does not respond adequately to child sexual abuse and that fails to protect children."

== See also ==
- Christianity by country
- Jehovah's Witnesses' handling of child sexual abuse
