= Jehovah's Witnesses in Canada =

Jehovah's Witnesses are a religious group that is an outgrowth of the Bible student movement founded by Charles Taze Russell in the nineteenth century. The Christian denomination had an early presence in Canada, with many adherents experiencing religious persecution, particularly in Quebec. Jehovah's Witnesses were banned from 1940 to 1943 as a result of the War Measures Act. The passing of the Canadian Bill of Rights in 1960 and the Canadian Charter of Rights and Freedoms in 1982 established broader protections for Jehovah's Witnesses and their freedom to worship.

== Radio stations ==
In the early 1900s, radio stations were operated by individual congregations in Saskatoon, Edmonton, Vancouver, and Toronto. In 1927, the federal minister responsible for radio licensing, Arthur Cardin, revoked the licences for these radio stations because they shared airspace with the Ku Klux Klan in Canada. According to Gary Botting, this "strange alliance" was formed due to a mutual opposition against the Roman Catholic church. In response, Joseph Rutherford bought airtime from other radio stations. When Hector Charlesworth banned this activity as well, he was "indirectly attacked" in an issue of the Golden Age and Jehovah's Witnesses launched a petition to regain their licences that resulted in 406,270 signatures. Charlesworth's actions were debated by the House of Commons in 1933. While multiple members expressed concern that this prohibition was censorship of free speech, the ban was not lifted.

== World War II ==
During the late 1930s, Witnesses were tried for sedition because their literature attacked the clergy and political leaders of the country. In 1940, 115 Jehovah's Witnesses (mostly in Quebec) were charged with crimes related to libel and selling literature without a license.

The denomination itself was banned in 1940 under the War Measures Act as a subversive organization. This ban continued until 1943. Hundreds of adherents were prosecuted for being members of an illegal organization. Jehovah's Witnesses were interned in camps along with political dissidents and people of Chinese and Japanese descent. During this period, many Jehovah's Witness children were expelled from school, while others were placed in foster homes or juvenile detention. After the ban was lifted, men who had been jailed tried to apply for an ordained minister exemption without success. This led to a legal case being filed, R. v. Stewart, which ruled that Jehovah's Witnesses were participants in a "commercial undertaking" and did not qualify as ministers. A similar outcome was reached in Greenlees v. A.G. Canada, where the judge decided that Jehovah's Witnesses could not be ministers because they considered every member to be one and that they did not have an organizational structure independent of the Watchtower Bible and Tract Society.

A separate ban on the Watchtower Bible and Tract Society was not lifted until 1945. More than 100,000 dollars in assets were seized by the Canadian government and tonnes of literature produced by the group were confiscated. After these bans were lifted, men who had been jailed tried to apply for the ordained minister exemption of the National Selective Service Mobilization Regulations without success. This led to a legal case being filed, R. v. Stewart, which ruled that Jehovah's Witnesses were participants in a "commercial undertaking" and did not qualify as ministers. A similar outcome was reached in Greenlees v. A.G. Canada, where the judge decided that Jehovah's Witnesses could not be ministers because they considered every member to be one and that they did not have an organizational structure independent of the Watchtower Bible and Tract Society.

== Quebec ==
Jehovah's Witnesses faced discrimination in Quebec until the Quiet Revolution, including bans on distributing literature or holding meetings. During the 1920s and 1930s, many Jehovah's Witnesses were charged with violating municipal laws through selling books. Non-Catholic religious minorities were especially persecuted after World War II during the Duplessis era. Quebec's population at the time was 95% Roman Catholic. Jehovah's Witnesses preached frequently while denouncing Catholicism and their publications depicted the pope as a whore. The group was considered to be a "seditious" and "subversive" religion. Through the Padlock Act and other legal measures, the activities of Jehovah's Witnesses were legally restricted. In 1947, Jehovah's Witnesses launched a preaching campaign condemning these restrictions and advocating the rights of religious minorities. The Legislative Assembly of Quebec responded to this campaign with increasing severity through the control of "subversive" materials. Individual municipalities also passed legislature restricting religious activities. Rabbi Solomon Frank, a founding member of the Canadian Jewish Congress (CJC), advocated for the religious freedom of Jehovah's Witnesses, criticizing Quebec's government of being "anti-democratic." 800 charges were laid against the 300 adherents in the province by September 1946. In response, Jehovah's Witnesses published Quebec's Burning Hate for God and Christ and Freedom is the Shame of all of Canada, which Duplessis perceived as another subversive act and copies of the tract were seized by police. Shortly afterwards, adherents faced more than 1,000 charges.

=== Saumur v The City of Quebec ===
In 1953, the case of Saumur v Quebec (City of) (1953) 25 CR 299 (in which a Jehovah's Witness challenged a Quebec City bylaw prohibiting public distribution of literature without a permit) left the question of religious freedom undecided as: "both Parliament and the provinces could validly limit freedom of worship providing they did so in the course of legislating on some other subject which lay within their respective powers." It is considered to be a landmark case for religious freedom in Canada.

This decision was part of a series of cases the Supreme Court dealt with concerning the rights of Jehovah's Witnesses under the Duplessis government of Quebec. Previous to this there was the case of R. v. Boucher [1951] S.C.R. 265 that upheld the right to distribute pamphlets.

=== Roncarelli v Duplessis ===
Subsequent to Saumur was the case of Roncarelli v Duplessis [1959] S.C.R. 121. The court held that in 1946 Maurice Duplessis, both Premier and Attorney General of Quebec, had overstepped his authority by ordering the manager of the Liquor Commission to revoke the liquor licence of Frank Roncarelli, a Montreal restaurant owner and Jehovah's Witness who was an outspoken critic of the Roman Catholic Church in Quebec. Roncarelli provided bail for Jehovah's Witnesses arrested for distributing pamphlets attacking the Roman Catholic Church. The Supreme Court found Duplessis personally liable for $33,123.56 in damages plus Roncarelli's court costs.

=== Other cases ===
In several other cases, including Chaput v Romain (1955) and Lamb v Benoit (1959), Jehovah's Witnesses successfully sued the police for damages. In Chaput v. Romain, police had raided a home where a religious service by Jehovah's Witnesses was being conducted, seized bibles and other religious paraphernalia, and disrupted the service despite not having a warrant and no charges being laid. In Lamb v. Benoit, a Jehovah's Witness, was arrested for distributing religious pamphlets in Verdun, Quebec, in 1946, along with three other members of the religion. She was accused by the plaintiff of distributing copies of Quebec's Burning Hate, but the Supreme Court found no evidence of that specific pamphlet being distributed. Lamb was detained for a weekend without access to legal counsel. Local authorities offered to release Lamb if she would not hold them responsible for her detention, but she refused. She was then charged with conspiracy to publish sedition, but this was dismissed by a trial judge and that decision was upheld when appealed.

== Canadian Bill of Rights ==
In order to obtain religious freedom, Jehovah's Witnesses in Canada helped promote the creation of a national bill of rights. In 1946, a provincial bill had been enacted ensuring religious freedom through the Saskatchewan Bill of Rights. On June 9, 1947, Jehovah's Witnesses presented a petition to Canada's parliament for the enactment of a similar bill, followed by a similar petition in 1949. John Diefenbaker became an advocate of the bill.

== See also ==
- Jehovah's Witnesses and governments
- Jehovah's Witnesses in the United States
- Persecution of Jehovah's Witnesses in Nazi Germany
- Internment of Japanese Canadians
- Italian Canadian internment
- Ukrainian Canadian internment
- Bethany Hughes

== Sources ==
- Beaman, Lori (2008). Defining Harm: Religious Freedom and the Limits of the Law. UBC Press. ISBN 978-0-7748-1429-4.
- Botting, Gary (1993). Fundamental Freedoms and Jehovah's Witnesses. University of Calgary Press. ISBN 1-895176-06-9.
- Richardson, James T. (2015). "In Defense of Religious Rights: Jehovah's Witness Legal Cases around the World". In Hunt, Stephen J. (ed.). Handbook of Global Contemporary Christianity. Brill. pp. 285–307. ISBN 978-90-04-29102-7.
