= William J. Whalen =

American religious writer (1926–2008)

William Joseph Whalen (January 1, 1926 – March 25, 2008) was a nationally known US non-fiction writer and an expert on comparative religion.

== Biography ==
Whalen attended the University of Notre Dame and received degrees from Marquette and Northwestern. He was an information officer with the U. S. Navy during World War II and served on Saipan and Guam.

For over forty years Whalen worked at Purdue University as a professor of communication. From 1950 he also directed the publications program at that school and in 1960 helped found Purdue University Press.

Whalen, a Roman Catholic, authored or co-authored fifteen books and wrote over two hundred articles, pamphlets and encyclopedia articles. Much of his writing compares Catholicism with other beliefs.

He died in 2008 at the age of 82 in West Lafayette, Indiana. At his death, he was director emeritus of university publications and professor emeritus of communication.

== Partial list of writings ==
Books

- Separated Brethren: A Review of Protestant, Anglican, Eastern Orthodox & Other Religions..., Our Sunday Visitor (IN); Revised ed. (September 2002), 287pp., ISBN 1-931709-05-X
- Christianity and American Freemasonry, Ignatius Press (1998, 3rd ed.) 215pp., ISBN 0-89870-672-6
- Your Guide to Effective Publications: a handbook for campus publications professionals, with Kelvin J. Arden, CASE (1991), 167pp. ISBN 0-89964-282-9
- Strange Gods: Contemporary Religious Cults in America, Our Sunday Visitor Inc., Ex-library ed. (December 1981), 130pp. ISBN 0-87973-666-6
- Other Religions in a World of Change, with Carl J. Pfeifer S.J., Ave Maria Press (1975), 128pp. ISBN 0-87793-075-9
- Minority Religions in America, Alba House; Rev Sub ed. (1972), 226pp. ISBN 0-8189-0413-5
- Latter-day Saints in the Modern World: an Account of Contemporary Mormonism (Rev. ed.), University of Notre Dame Press, 1967 [1964], OCLC 313751
- Handbook of Secret Organizations, Bruce Publishing: Milwaukee (1966), 169pp. LCCN 66-026658
- Armageddon Around the Corner: a report on Jehovah's Witnesses, J. Day Co.: New York (1962), 249pp. OCLC Number: 1261733
- Christian Family Finance, Paulist Press (Revised ed. 1964), 160pp. (1960 ed., Bruce Publishing, ASIN: B0007DZQ6S)
- Faiths for the Few: A Study of Minority Religions (Bruce Publishing, 1963)

Pamphlets

- Reaching Out to the Lutherans with Heart and Mind, Liguori Publications (June 1984), 32pp. ISBN 0-89243-206-3
- Reaching Out to the Methodists with Heart and Mind, Liguori Publications (June 1984), 32pp. ISBN 0-89243-207-1
- Reaching Out to the Presbyterians and the Reformed with Heart and Mind, Liguori Publications (June 1984), 32pp. ISBN 0-89243-208-X
- Reaching Out to the Baptists with Heart and Mind, Liguori Publications (June 1984), 32pp. ISBN 0-89243-209-8
- Reaching Out to the Episcopalians with Heart and Mind, Liguori Publications (June 1984), 32pp. ISBN 0-89243-210-1
