= Persecution of Jehovah's Witnesses in Nazi Germany =

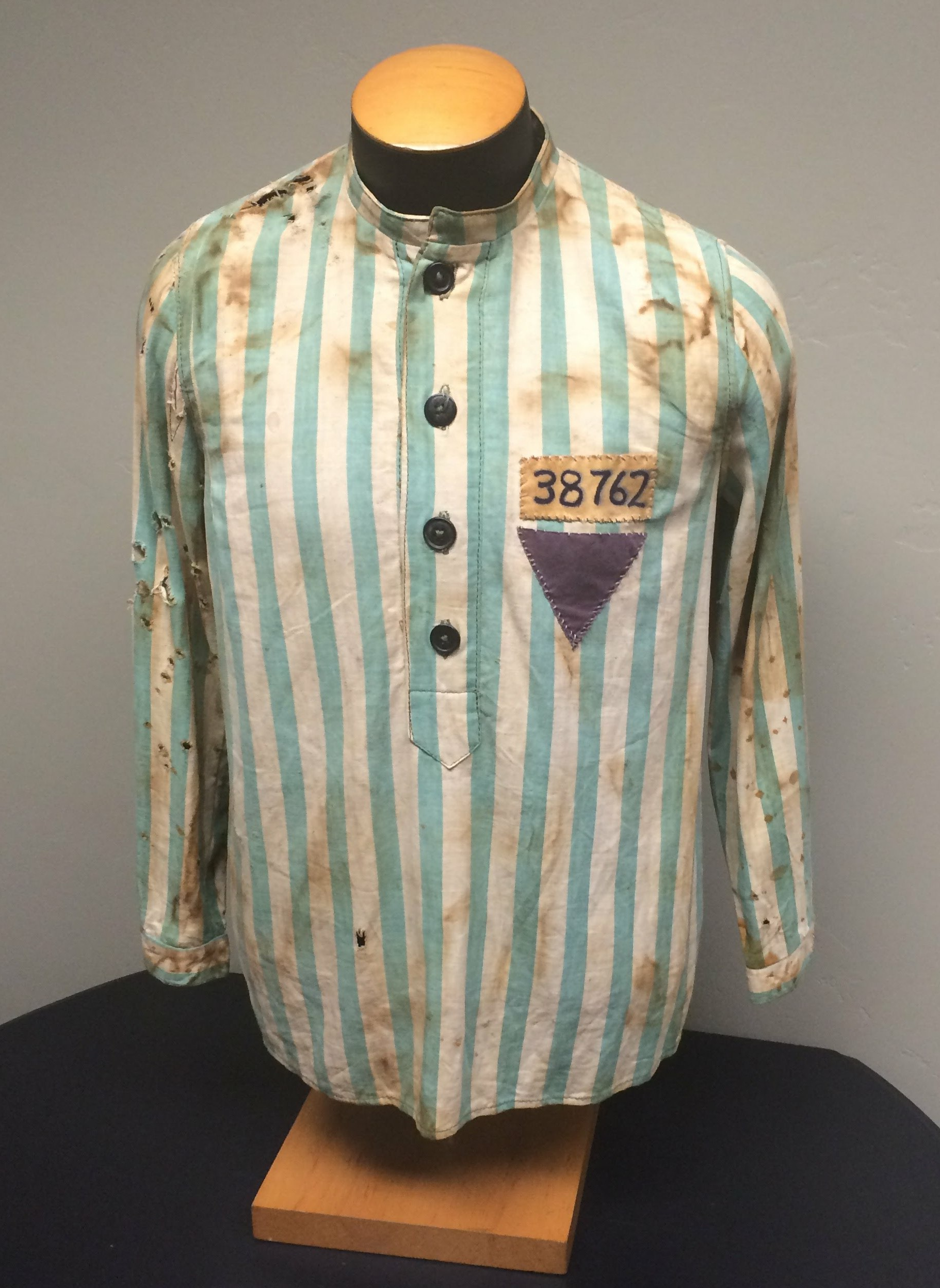
A prisoner uniform with purple triangle.

Jehovah's Witnesses suffered religious persecution in Nazi Germany between 1933 and 1945 after refusing to perform military service, join Nazi organizations, or give allegiance to the Hitler regime. An estimated 10,000 Witnesses were sent to Nazi concentration camps. It is estimated that between 2,000 and 5,000 died in custody, including 250 who were executed. They were the first Christian denomination banned by the Nazi government and the most extensively and intensively persecuted.

Unlike Jews and Romani, who were persecuted on the basis of their race, Jehovah's Witnesses could escape persecution and personal harm by renouncing their religious beliefs by signing a document indicating renunciation of their faith, submission to state authority, and support of the German military. Historian Sybil Milton concludes that "their courage and defiance in the face of torture and death punctures the myth of a monolithic Nazi state ruling over docile and submissive subjects."

Despite early attempts to demonstrate shared goals with the National Socialist regime, the group came under increasing public and governmental persecution from 1933, with many expelled from jobs and schools, deprived of income, and suffering beatings and imprisonment. Historians are divided over whether the Nazis intended to exterminate them, but several authors have claimed the Witnesses' outspoken condemnation of the Nazis contributed to their level of suffering.

== Pre-Nazi era ==
Jehovah's Witnesses were an outgrowth of the United States–based International Bible Students, who began missionary work in Europe in the 1890s. A German branch office of the Watch Tower Society opened in Elberfeld in 1902. By 1933, almost 20,000 Witnesses were counted as active door-to-door preachers, and their annual Memorial service was attracting almost 25,000 people. In Dresden, there were more Bible Students than in New York, where the Watch Tower Society was headquartered.

Members of the movement, who were known as Ernste Bibelforscher, or Earnest Bible Students, had attracted opposition since the end of World War I, with accusations that they were Bolsheviks, communists and covertly Jewish. From 1920, the German Evangelical Church called for a ban on Watch Tower Society publications, which were engaging in increasing amounts of antichurch polemic. Through the remainder of the 1920s, opposition mounted from a combination of church and Völkisch movement agitation and pamphlet campaigns. Nazis began to harass Bible Students, with SA members also disrupting meetings.

In 1922, German Bible Students were arrested on charges of illegal peddling as they publicly distributed Watch Tower Society literature. Between 1927 and 1930, almost 5,000 charges were brought against members of the movement and although most ended in acquittals some severe sentences were also handed down.

In 1930, calls for state intervention against the Bible Students increased, and on 28 March 1931, Reich President Paul von Hindenburg issued the Decree for the Resistance of Political Acts of Violence, which provided for action to be taken in cases in which religious organizations, institutions or customs were "abused or maliciously disparaged". Bavaria became the first German state where the decree was used against the Bible Students, with a police order issued on November 18 to prohibit and confiscate all Bible Student publications throughout the state. A second decree in 1932 widened the ban in other German states. By the end of 1932, more than 2,300 charges against Bible Students were pending.

== Legislative developments ==
Adolf Hitler was appointed chancellor of Germany on 30 January 1933, and from that point forward, persecution of Jehovah's Witnesses intensified. Witnesses, being politically neutral, refused to swear loyalty to the Nazi regime. Initially, Witness indifference to the Nazi state manifested itself in the refusal to raise their arms in the Nazi salute, join the German Labor Front (DAF), participate in Nazi welfare collections, perform air raid duties, or participate in Nazi rallies and parades. Nazi Party SA stormtroopers raided the homes of Witnesses who failed to vote in a November 1933 plebiscite over German withdrawal from the League of Nations and marched them to the polling booths. Some were beaten or forced to walk holding placards declaring their "betrayal" of the fatherland; in one town, a billboard was displayed in the marketplace listing Bible Student "traitors" who had not voted, and mobs also gathered outside Witnesses' homes to throw stones or chant. Similar action was taken at subsequent elections in the one-party state.

Nazi authorities denounced Jehovah's Witnesses for their ties to the United States and derided the apparent revolutionary millennialism of their preaching that a battle of Armageddon would precede the rule of Christ on earth. They linked Jehovah's Witnesses to "international Jewry" by pointing to Witness reliance on certain Old Testament texts. The Nazis had grievances with many of the smaller Protestant groups on these issues, but only Jehovah's Witnesses and the Christadelphian Church refused to bear arms or swear loyalty to the state.

Activities of the Bible Students Association were banned in the states of Mecklenburg-Schwerin and Bavaria on 10 April 1933 and 13 April 1933, respectively. When Witnesses responded with a nationwide house-to-house booklet distribution campaign, many were arrested, and within a week bans were extended to the states of Saxony and Hessen. Publications were also confiscated in some states. On 24 April, police seized the Bible Student headquarters at Magdeburg, withdrawing five days later after US diplomatic efforts. From mid-May, other states issued decrees outlawing the Bible Students, and by the middle of June they were banned in almost every state. In one state's decree, the rationale for the ban was said to be that Bible Students were "imposing" Watch Tower Society journals on householders, "which contain malicious attacks on the major Christian churches and their institutions".

Prussia, Germany's biggest state, imposed a ban on 24 June, explaining that the Bible Students were attracting and harboring subversive former members of the Communist and Marxist parties. Its decree added that the Bible Students:

...are obviously involved in agitation against political and religious institutions in word and written form. By declaring both institutions as agencies of Satan, they undermine the very foundation of life in the people's community. In their numerous publications ... they deliberately and maliciously misrepresent Bible accounts for the purpose of ridiculing State and church institutions. One of the characteristics of their struggle is a fanatical manipulation of their followers ... It is therefore obvious that the above-mentioned association tends to be in complete opposition to the present state and its cultural and moral structures.

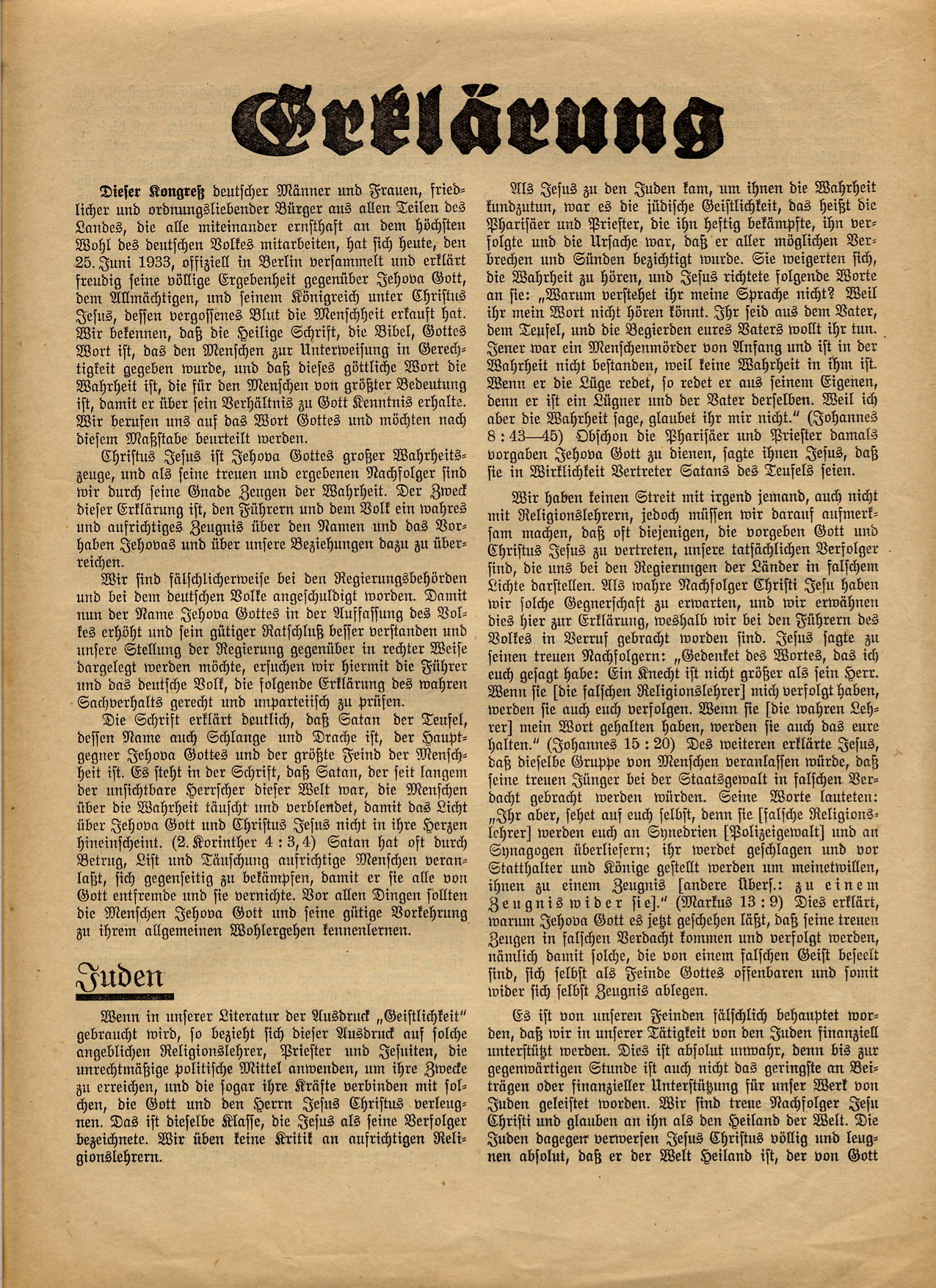
Wilmersdorfer Erklaerung 1933-06-25 (page 1)

On 25 June 1933, about 7000 Witnesses assembled at the Wilmersdorfer Tennishallen in Berlin, where a 3800-word "Declaration of Facts" was issued. The document, written by Watch Tower Society president Joseph Franklin Rutherford, asserted the group's political neutrality, appealed for the right to publicly preach, and claimed it was the victim of a misinformation campaign by other churches. The Declaration also stated, "A careful examination of our books and literature will disclose the fact that the very high ideals held and promulgated by the present national government are set forth in and endorsed and strongly emphasized in our publications, and show that Jehovah God will see to it that these high ideals in due time will be attained by all persons who love righteousness." Some 2.1 million copies of the declaration, reproduced as a four-page pamphlet, were distributed publicly throughout Germany, with a copy also sent to Hitler, accompanied by a seven-page cover letter assuring the Chancellor that the International Bible Students Association (IBSA) "was not in opposition to the national government of the German Reich", but that, to the contrary, "the entirely religious, nonpolitical objectives and efforts of the Bible Students" were "completely in agreement with the corresponding goals of the national government". German historian Detlef Garbe described the declaration as part of the group's efforts to adapt at a time of increasing persecution, while Canadian historian Professor James Penton, a former Jehovah's Witness and critic of the denomination, claimed the declaration was a compromising document that proves "that Watch Tower leaders were attempting to pander to the Nazis"—an allegation the Watch Tower Society rejected in a 1998 magazine article.

The distribution of the declaration prompted a new wave of persecution against German Witnesses. On 28 June, thirty stormtroopers occupied the branch office for a second time, closing the factory, sealing the printing presses, and hoisting a swastika over the building. In late August, authorities used 25 trucks to transport about 70 tonnes of Watch Tower literature and Bibles to the city's outskirts and publicly burned them. Preaching activities and meetings in private homes continued, though the threat of Gestapo raids caused many believers to withdraw association and activity in some places ceased. When authorities discovered banned literature was being smuggled into Germany from abroad, Bavarian police ordered the confiscation of mail of all known Bible Students and expressed irritation that their activity was increasing rather than ceasing.

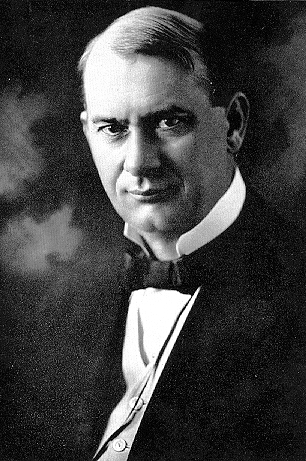
Watch Tower Society president Joseph Rutherford.

By early 1934, Rutherford had concluded that an improvement in conditions within Germany was unlikely. On 9 February 1934, the Watch Tower Society president sent a strongly worded letter to Hitler, asking the chancellor to allow the Witnesses to assemble and worship without hindrance, warning that if he failed to do so by 24 March, the organization would publicise their "unjust treatment" throughout the world. He threatened that Jehovah God would also punish Hitler and destroy him at Armageddon. The society's German branch president Paul Balzereit directed members that they should continue to distribute The Watchtower, but that meetings be kept to about three to five people in size and public preaching be discontinued. But in September 1934, at an international convention of 3,500 Witnesses in Basel, Switzerland, under the theme "Fear Them Not", Rutherford reversed the instruction. He urged the 1,000 German Witnesses present to resume completely their preaching activity, starting with a collective witnessing effort on 7 October. The convention also passed a resolution of protest, a copy of which was sent to Hitler with the warning: "Refrain from further persecution of Jehovah's Witnesses; otherwise God will destroy you and your national party."

On 8 October, an international campaign was launched to flood the Reich chancellory with telegrams and letters of protest. Five hundred protest telegrams were sent to the chancellory that day. During the next two days, large numbers arrived from around the world, most of them from the United States, Britain, France, Switzerland and the Netherlands. Foreign post offices were told to stop transmitting the telegrams because the recipient refused to accept them, and on 10 October, the Berlin main telegraph office arranged with several overseas telegraph offices to destroy all telegrams that had not yet been transmitted. More than 1,000 letters—almost all of them with the same wording and signed "Jehovah's Witnesses"—were also received at the presidential office, and in November, those letters were transferred to the Secret State Police "for further investigation".

In late 1934, all state bans against the Witnesses were replaced with a prohibition at the Reich level. State governments were instructed in July 1935 to confiscate all Watch Tower Society publications, including Bibles, and in December, nine Watch Tower leaders were sentenced to up to 2½ years in jail for defying bans. Yet throughout 1933 and 1934 some courts continued to acquit Witnesses after legal and constitutional challenges.

When Germany reintroduced universal military service in 1935, Jehovah's Witnesses generally refused to enroll. As conscientious objectors, they refused to bear arms for any political power. The Nazis prosecuted Jehovah's Witnesses for failing to report for conscription and arrested those who did missionary work for undermining the morale of the nation. John Conway, a British historian, stated that they were "against any form of collaboration with the Nazis and against service in the army."

Children of Jehovah's Witnesses also suffered under the Nazi regime. In classrooms, teachers ridiculed children who refused to give the Heil Hitler salute or sing patriotic songs. Principals found reasons to expel them from school. Following the lead of adults, classmates shunned or beat the children of Witnesses. Approximately 800 children of Jehovah's Witnesses were taken away from their families. Witness children typically expressed defiance to the Nazi regime's attempts to make them go against their beliefs. They were often expelled from public schools due to their refusal to say "Heil Hitler". Some children were sent to reeducation centers, while others were adopted by families in good standing with the Nazi regime.

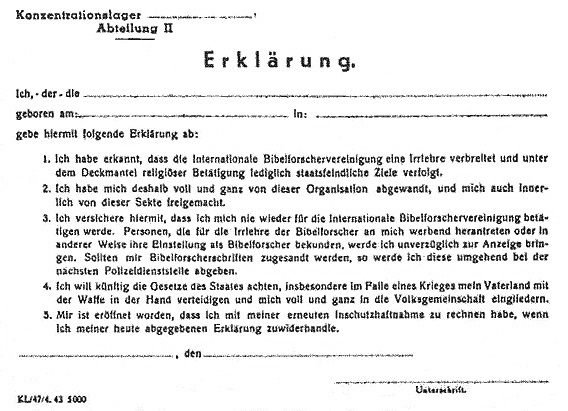
Nazi renunciation document

Jehovah's Witnesses could, however, escape persecution and personal harm by renouncing their religious beliefs. From 1935, Gestapo officers offered members a document to sign indicating renunciation of their faith, submission to state authority, and support of the German military. By signing the document, individuals vowed to refrain from any association with members of the IBSA for the purposes of studying the Bible, The Watchtower or other Bible Student publications, refrain from participating in any Bible Student activities and also to report to authorities any observations that members were continuing the organizational structure of Jehovah's Witnesses. Garbe says a "relatively high number" of people signed the statement before the war, but "extremely low numbers" of Bible Student prisoners did so in concentration camps in later years.

== Punishment ==
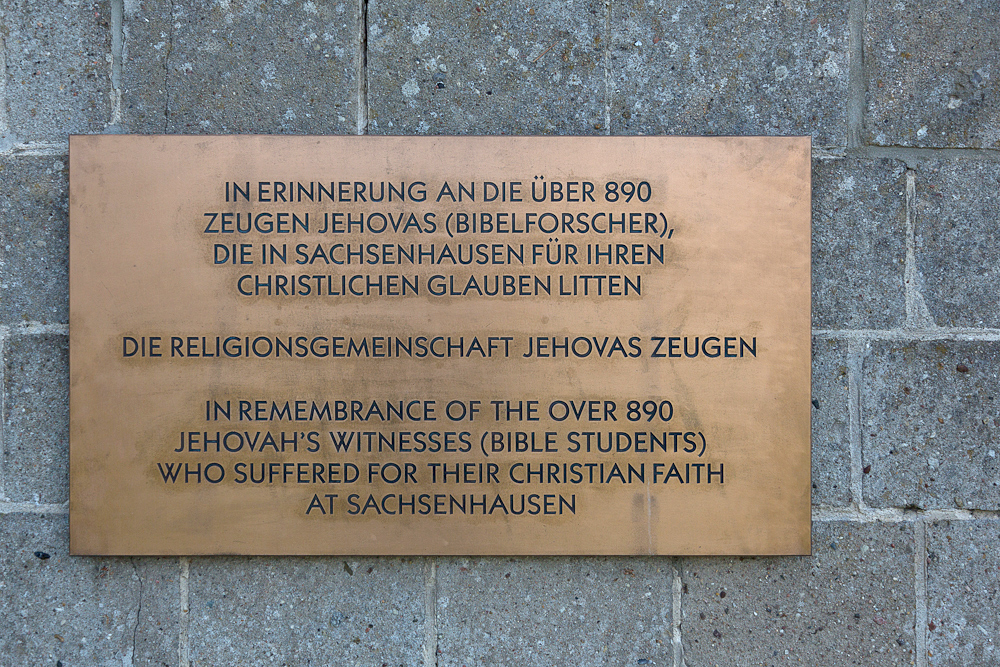
Memorial plaque at Sachsenhausen concentration camp

From 1933, Witnesses working in post offices, railway stations or other civil service jobs began to be dismissed for refusing to give the compulsory Hitler salute. From August 1934, they could also lose their jobs for refusing to take an official oath swearing loyalty and obedience to Hitler. Teachers were required to sign a statement confirming they were not members of the International Bible Students Association and were fired if they refused. Jehovah's Witnesses were dismissed in the private sector as well, often at the insistence of the German Labor Front or Nazi Party members. In 1936, the Nazi press urged that Bible Students be removed from all German companies, while self-employed members of the group were denied professional or business licences to carry out their work on the basis that their refusal to join Nazi organizations marked them as "politically unreliable".

The state confiscated motor vehicles and bicycles used by Witnesses in their businesses, withdrew driver's licences, withdrew pensions, and evicted Witnesses from their homes. Schoolchildren were required to sing the Horst Wessel song and Deutschlandlied at a flag salute roll call, give the Hitler salute, and take part in ceremonies honoring Hitler; those who refused were beaten by teachers, and sometimes by classmates, while many were also expelled. From March 1936, authorities began removing Witness children from their parents, forcing some of them to undergo "corrective training".

From early 1935, Gestapo officers began widening their use of "protective detention", usually when judges failed to convict Witnesses on charges of defying the Bible Student ban. Bible Students deemed to "present an imminent danger to the National Socialist state because of their activities" were from that point not handed to courts for punishment but sent directly to concentration camps for incarceration for several months. However, even those who completed their prison terms were routinely arrested by the Gestapo upon release and taken into protective custody.

More brutal methods of punishment began to be applied from 1936, including horsewhipping, prolonged daily beatings, the torture of family members and the threat of shooting. Some Witnesses were placed in mental institutions and subjected to psychiatric treatment; sterilization was ordered for some deemed to be "stubborn" in their refusal to denounce their faith.

Following an assembly in Lucerne, Switzerland, in early September 1936, up to 3000 copies of a resolution of protest were sent to government, public and clerical leaders, stepping up the Watch Tower Society's anti-Catholic polemic. Several German Witnesses who attended the convention were arrested by waiting police as they returned to their homes, and between August and September the Gestapo arrested more than 1000 members. The society responded with a pamphlet campaign on 12 December, dropping up to 200,000 copies of the Lucerne resolution in mailboxes and also leaving them at phone booths, park benches and parked cars. Those arrested in subsequent police raids were sentenced to up to two years in prison. The number of arrests increased; in Dresden alone, as many as 1500 Witnesses had been arrested by mid-1937. Another letterbox campaign was carried out in June 1937, a year in which the Watch Tower Society announced German Witnesses had distributed more than 450,000 books and booklets in 12 months.

Compulsory military service for all men between 18 and 45 years of age was introduced by Hitler in March 1935. No exemptions were provided for religious or conscientious reasons, and Witnesses who refused to serve or take the oath of allegiance to Hitler were sent to prison or concentration camp, generally for terms of one or two years. At the outbreak of war in August 1939, more serious punishments were applied. A decree was enacted that greatly increased penal regulations during periods of war and states of emergency and included in the decree was an offense of "demoralization of the armed forces"; any refusal to perform military service or public inducement to this effect would be punishable by death. Between August 1939 and September 1940, 152 Bible Students appeared before the highest military court of the Wehrmacht, charged with demoralization of the armed forces, and 112 were executed, usually by beheading. Garbe estimates about 250 German and Austrian Jehovah's Witnesses were executed during World War II as a result of military court decisions. In November 1939, another regulation was issued providing for the jailing of anyone who supported or belonged to an "anti-military association" or displayed an "anti-military attitude", which allowed authorities to impose prison sentences on the charge of IBSA membership. Death penalties were applied frequently after 1943.

== Concentration camps ==
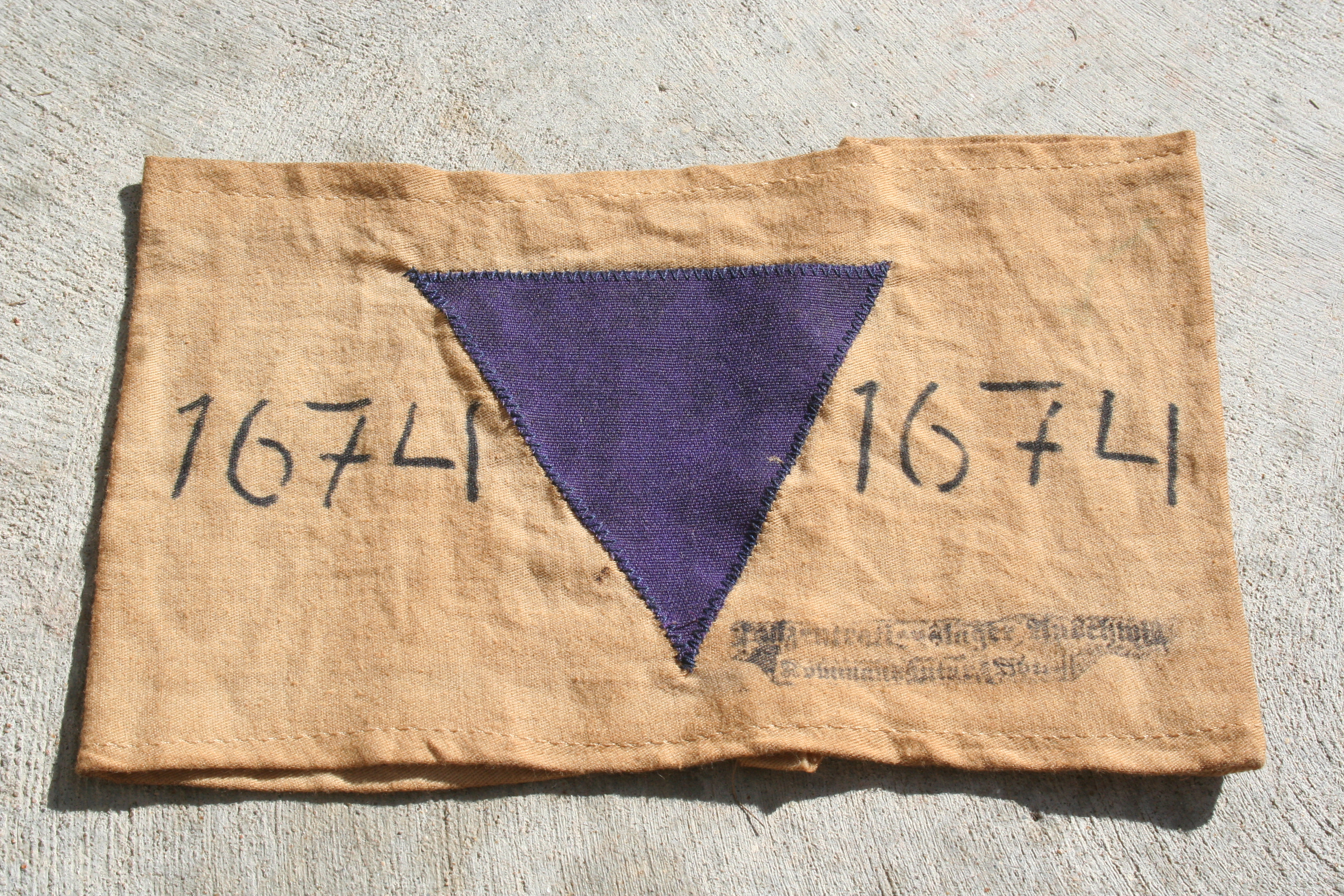
An example of a purple triangle used to identify Jehovah's Witnesses

From 1935, the authorities began sending hundreds of Jehovah's Witnesses to concentration camps, where they were imprisoned with Communists, Socialists, other political prisoners and union members. In May 1938, they accounted for 12 percent of all prisoners at Buchenwald concentration camp near Weimar; by May 1939, they represented 40 percent of all prisoners at Schloss Lichentenburg, the central concentration camp for women, though as the total number of prisoners increased rapidly, the proportion of Witnesses generally fell to about 3 percent. About 2000 Witnesses were eventually sent to Nazi concentration camps, where they were identified by purple triangles; as many as 1200 died in custody, including 250 who were executed. Garbe claims members of the group were special objects of hatred by the SS, receiving beatings, whippings and public humiliation and given the dirtiest and most laborious work details for refusing to salute, stand at attention or sing Nazi songs. They were subjected to high-pressure jets of ice-cold water from fire hydrants and subjected to arbitrary acts of torture, including pushing a fully laden wheelbarrow with their necks while crawling on hands and knees. Others were forced to stand still for an entire day in the heat or cold, or were confined in groups in small closets in an attempt to suffocate them. From March to December 1938, Jehovah's Witnesses in Buchenwald were not allowed to send or receive letters or to purchase food. Many approached starvation and were forced to eat leaves from trees and bushes. Many were forced to engage in a "drill" that included rolling, creeping, hopping, and running for 75 minutes while camp guards kicked and beat them, while others, forced to work in stone quarries, were refused medical attention when sick. Jehovah's Witnesses would preach inside the concentration camps, hold meetings, and smuggle in their religious literature.

Conditions for Witnesses improved in 1942, when they were increasingly given work details that required little supervision, such as farming, gardening, transportation and unloading goods, while others worked in civilian clothing in a health resort, as housekeepers for Nazi officials, or were given construction and craft tasks at military buildings.

In July 1944, Himmler ordered Ernst Kaltenbrunner, the head of the Reich Security Main Office (RSHA), to begin sending Jehovah's Witnesses to the occupied east. Himmler viewed the Jehovah's Witnesses as frugal, hard-working, honest and fanatic in their pacifism, and that these traits were extremely desirable for the suppressed nations in the east.

Some Jehovah's Witnesses refused to do any work related to the German war effort, leading to the execution of several members.

== Causes of persecution and Nazi motives ==
Jehovah's Witnesses were one of a range of religious denominations against whom authorities took action from 1933, declaring that they "contributed to the ideological fragmentation of the German people", preventing the forming of a united German community. Historians, including Canadian Michael H. Kater, Christine Elizabeth King from England and Austrian Wolfgang Neugebauer, have suggested the extraordinary animosity between National Socialism and Bible Student teachings was rooted in the similarity in structure of both ideologies, which were based on authoritarianism and totalitarianism and which each believed had a monopoly on the "truth". Kater wrote:

Just as the National Socialist ideology, so were also the teachings of Jehovah's Witnesses dominated not by a democratic but an authoritarian policy. Both systems were totalitarian in that they strictly integrated national comrades as well as fellow believers into the respective authoritarian structure and requested them to give up their own personal identity for the objectives of the system. While the National Socialists accepted the "Führer State", the "Earnest Bible Students" submitted to the "Theocracy", in which not the Führer, but Jehovah, was the dictatorial ruler. Since both groups claimed exclusiveness, this inevitably had to result in conflict. A Bible Student who had devoted himself to Jehovah was in no way able to carry out the duties that the National Socialist State demanded of him as a national comrade.

Garbe accepts that both ideologies claimed to represent the "epitome of truth", demanded the person as a whole, tolerated no questioning of ideology and also held a common belief in salvation utopias for certain parts of humankind and the vision of a Thousand-Year Reign. He adds that, pitted against a considerably more powerful organization, the group's efforts were doomed to fail.

German writer Falk Pingel argued that the source of controversy between the Bible Students and the Nazi party was their determination to continue their religious activities despite restrictions and Garbe, noting that the increasing repression by authorities simply provoked the group's determination to go underground and maintain their activity, concludes that "the extraordinary severity with which Jehovah's Witnesses were persecuted resulted from a conflict that gradually escalated in an interaction of action and reaction ... the authorities responsible for the persecution always responded with increasing severity to the continuous stubbornness of the IBSA members". He said that the Nazis were baffled by an opponent that, convinced it was being directed by God's channel, did not back down under intensified persecution, as expected. He wrote:

These factors could have contributed to the fact that ... efforts to break their resolve were intensified and even more brutal. From this point of view, the IBSA members contributed to a certain extent to the severity of the NS actions, but this certainly does not mean that they intentionally provoked these measures.

Penton noted that in August 1933, then branch overseer Martin Harbeck directed members that they should cease distributing literature and holding meetings without police permission. (At the beginning of 1934, the branch chief he had temporarily replaced, Paul Balzereit, had issued a similar instruction.) He said the organization's later decision to abandon caution and direct members to intensify their preaching efforts was a "reckless" behavior that caused Witnesses and their families more suffering than was necessary. Hitler, Penton argued, had become highly popular with the German populace by 1936, yet Witnesses persisted in distributing a Rutherford booklet that described the chancellor as "of unsound mind, cruel, malicious and ruthless". He said the international campaign to swamp Hitler with telegrams of protest in October 1934 infuriated the chancellor and was a major factor in bringing greater governmental persecution on them. Citing Dietrich Hellmund's description of their "incredible public militancy", he wrote: "Jehovah's Witnesses were the most stridently outspoken conscientious objectors in the country, and the Nazis had no intention of putting up with them ... No movement can constantly heap insults on all other religions, the business community and national governments in the way that the Bible Student-Jehovah's Witnesses did from 1918 onward without provoking a reaction."

Scholars are divided over the ultimate intention of the Nazi regime towards Jehovah's Witnesses. Garbe believes the Gestapo considered members of the denomination to be "incorrigible" elements who had to be ruthlessly eliminated. The 1934 telegram protest had prompted an "hysterical" Hitler to vow that "this brood will be exterminated in Germany", and he repeated the threat in August 1942. Watch Tower Society writer Wolfram Slupina claims the Nazis "attempted to consign the Witnesses to oblivion by systematically exterminating them". But Penton has argued there is abundant evidence that the Nazis had no intention to eradicate Witnesses. Since they were viewed as ordinary German citizens, the Nazis hoped to break their resistance and compel them to renounce their faith and declare loyalty to the Third Reich. Quoting Jehovah's Witness Jolene Chu, Penton wrote:

Capitulation, not annihilation seems to have been the Nazi goal for the Witnesses, despite the fact that Hitler had declared about them in 1934, "This brood will be exterminated!" The Gestapo and SS applied the usual torture methods, and in the process hundreds of Witnesses died. But a clue as to the Nazi aim of breaking the Witness resolve is found in a remarkable document offered repeatedly to Witness prisoners—a renunciation of their faith and a pledge of loyalty to the fatherland.

According to Penton, further evidence that the Nazis did not consider Witnesses inherently candidates for destruction in the same way as Jews, Romanis, and homosexuals, is that almost no Jehovah's Witnesses were gassed, and they were often employed domestically by the SS and in other jobs with significantly better conditions, improving their chances of survival.

== Kusserow family ==
The Kusserow family is among the most extensively documented cases of persecution of Jehovah's Witnesses under the Nazi regime. Franz and Hilda Kusserow, residents of Bad Lippspringe in North Rhine-Westphalia, had eleven children and were active Jehovah's Witnesses who maintained their religious practice even after Adolf Hitler's rise to power in 1933 and the states increased repression of the religious group. Two of their sons Wilhelm and Wolfgang Kusserow, were executed for refusing to perform military service and several other family members were imprisoned in concentration camps. The family's case is often mentioned in studies of religious persecution and conscientious objection during the Third Reich.

Annemarie Kusserow compiled an archive documenting the family's experiences. the archive include more than 1,000 photographs, letters, court records, Gestapo documents and farewell letters written by family members before their execution. The archive has been used by historians and institutions such as the United States Holocaust Memorial Museum, to document the persecution of Jehovah's Witnesses in Nazi Germany and has served as the basis for exhibitions and educational programs. Following Annemarie's death in 2005, ownership of the archive became a subject of an ongoing legal dispute between the German state and the Jehovah's Witnesses. The family's story has also been featured in the documentary Purple Triangles: The True Story of a German Family (1991) and it is frequently referenced in academic literature on the Nazi persecution of Jehovah's Witnesses.

== Aftermath and legacy ==
In socialist East Germany, from the 1950s to the 1980s, Jehovah's Witnesses were persecuted extensively by the State Security Service (the Stasi), who frequently used decomposition methods against them. Jehovah's Witnesses were considered to be a threat because their belief system did not conform to socialist standards, and their members sometimes had contact with the West.

In June 2026, a memorial commemorating Jehovah's Witnesses who were persecuted and murdered by the Nazis was inaugurated in Berlin's Tiergarten. The bronze sculpture was designed by Matthias Leeck and is located near the Goldfischteich, the site of a 1936 mass arrest carried out by the Gestapo. In July 2026, Germany's Federal Court of Justice ruled in favour of the Jehovah's Witnesses in a case concerning a unique archive. The archive contains documents, photographs, letters, Gestapo reports, arrest warrants and death sentences. According to the court ruling the archive which belonged to Annemarie Kusserow, was sold illegally by her brothers after her death to the Bundeswehr Military History Museum in Dresden.

== See also ==
- Persecution of Jehovah's Witnesses
- Persecution of Jehovah's Witnesses in Canada
- Jehovah's Witnesses and governments
- Declaration of Facts
- Max Liebster
- Simone Arnold Liebster
- Hermine Liska
- Wolfgang Kusserow
