= Château de Stoerenbourg =

Ruined castle in Alsace, France

- Haut-Rhin, France
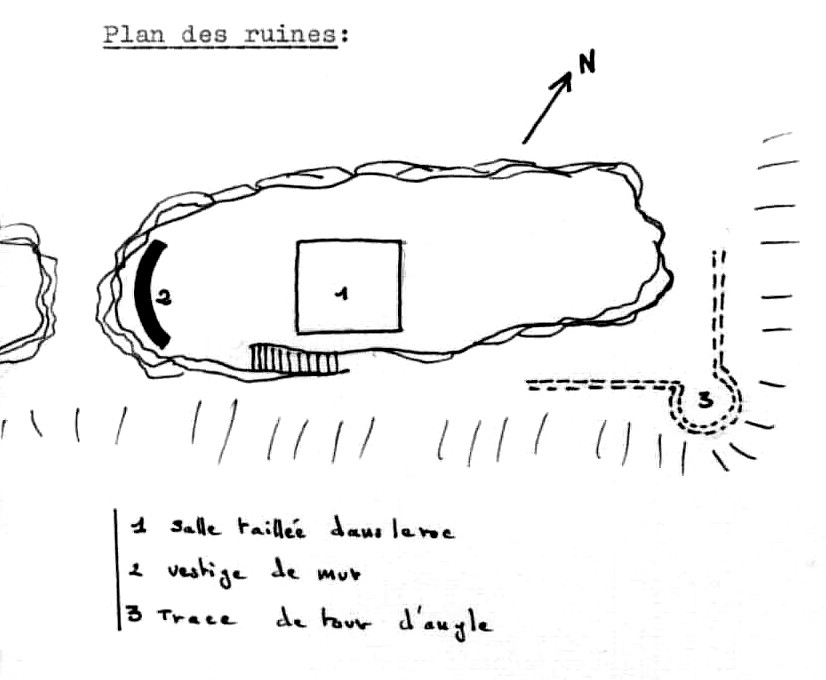
- Sitemap of Stoerenbourg

Site information
- Type: Medieval castle

Location
- Coordinates: 47.878°N 7.003°E

Site history
- Built: 13th century
- Built by: Murbach Abbey, Regent

Château de Stoerenbourg is a ruined castle in the commune of Husseren-Wesserling, close to the village Mitzach, in the department of Haut-Rhin, Alsace, France. The castle was destroyed in 1637, and very little remains of it.

== Toponymy ==
The Stoerenbourg takes its name from that of the family who lived there: the Stoer of Stoerenbourg.

== History ==
Castle was built in 1395. It was built by the Abbey of Murbach to supervise the passage of the pass of Bussang. Until 1576, the castle was called "Waldstein".It then takes the name of a family dedicated to the abbey, Stoer Stoerenbourg. These will become one of the most powerful families in Upper Alsace. The castle then passes into the hands of the Freundstein Waldner. It was razed in 1637 during the Thirty Years' War.

== Location ==
The castle is located in a forest area on a hill west of the village of Mitzach, although dependent on the territory of Husseren-Wesserling. Access to Stoerenbourg is on foot using a path from the current Domaine de Stoerenbourg. It is a private property.

== Architecture ==
There are very few remains of the implanted castle: a low wall at the end of the five-meter deep fault dug by hands to separate the rock, in two parts, as well as scree covered by vegetation.

Ruins of Château de Stoerenbourg
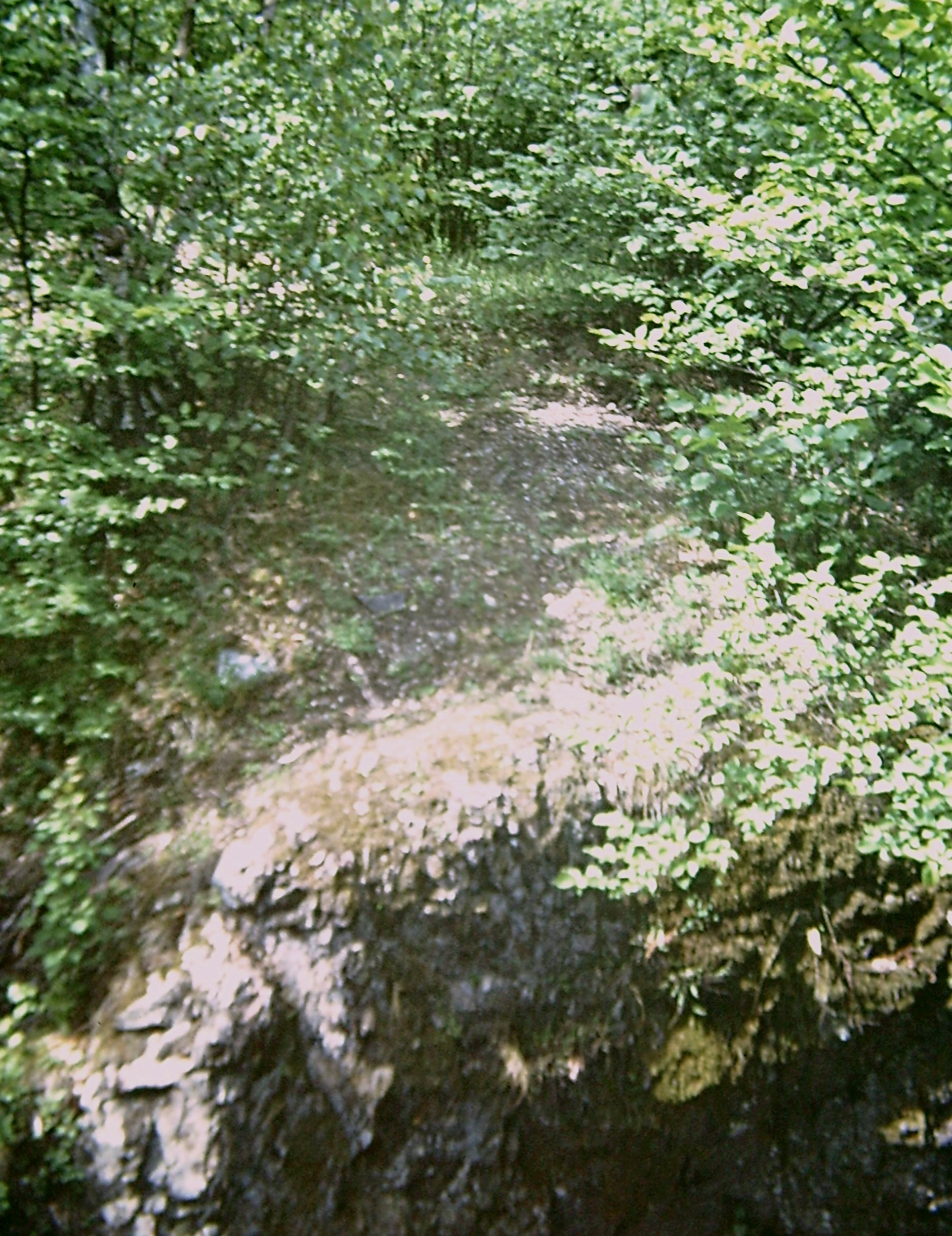
Stoerenbourg ditch

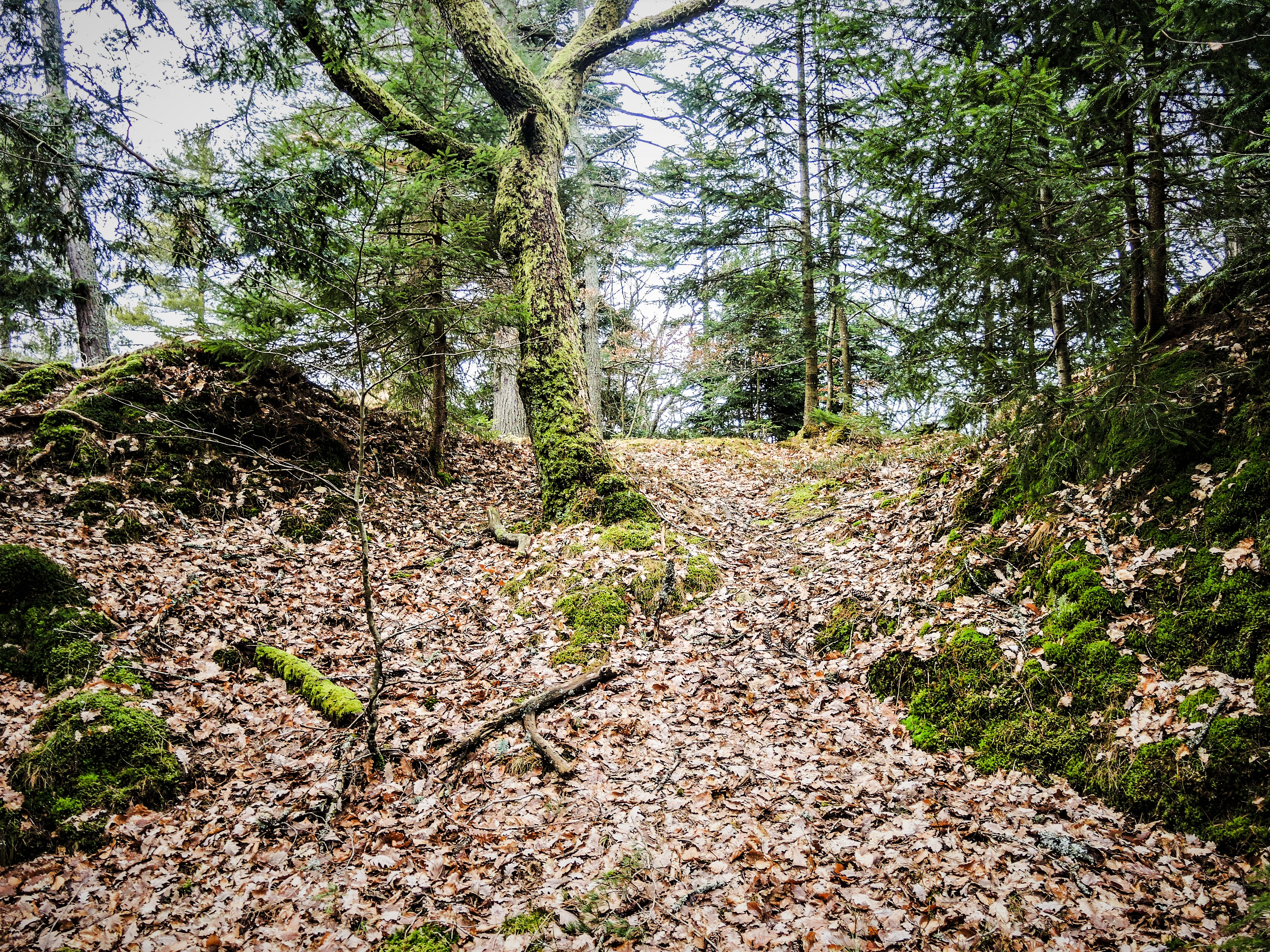
Threshold for access to the summit of the former Stoerenburg Castle

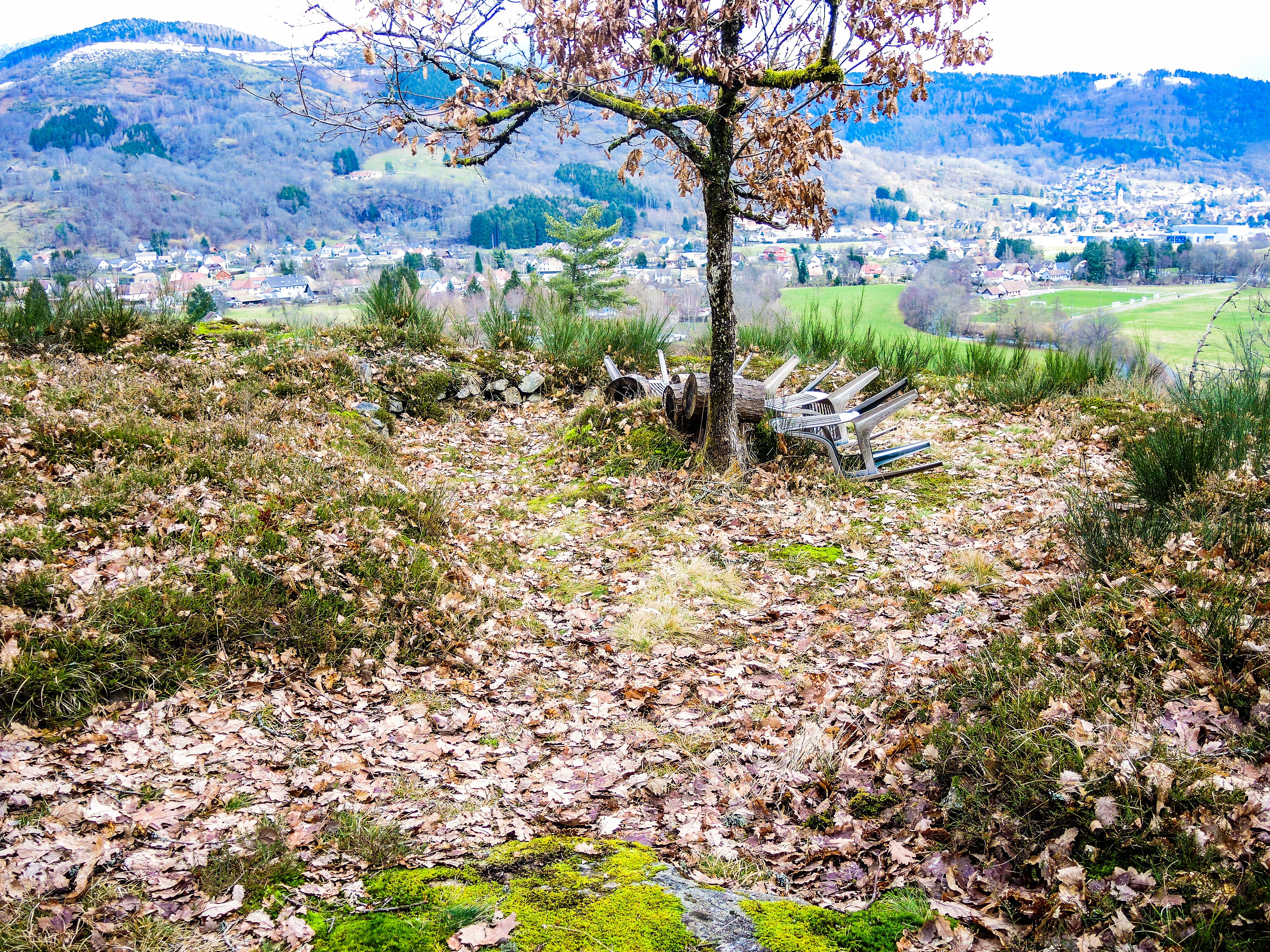
Location of the south tower of the old castle of Stoerenburg

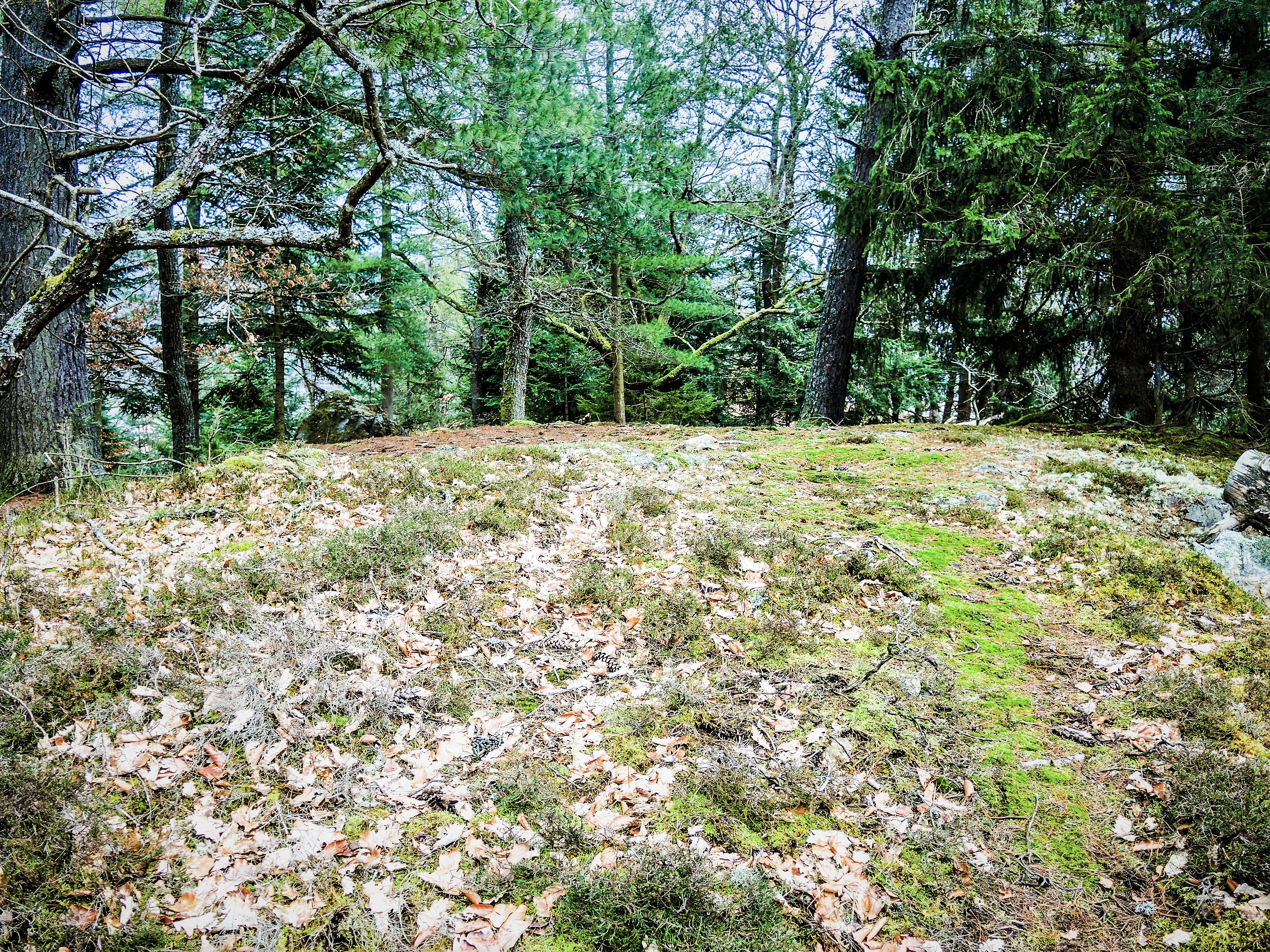
Upper part of the old Stoerenburg Castle
