= Marcel Simon (historian) =

- Born: 10 April 1907; Husseren-Wesserling, France
- Died: 26 October 1986 (aged 79); Strasbourg, France
- Occupation: historian
- Known for: history of religions
- Notable work: Verus Israel

Marcel Simon (10 April 1907 in Husseren-Wesserling – 26 October 1986 in Strasbourg) was a French specialist in the history of religions, particularly relations between Christianity and Judaism in antiquity. Simon received an honorary doctorate by the Faculty of Theology at Uppsala University in 1980.

His major work, Verus Israel, was published in 1948; it has been described as 'seminal'.

He was closely associated with Henri Marrou, appreciating his layman's approach to Vatican II.
