= Simone Arnold Liebster =

French victim of Nazi persecution (born 1930)

- Born: 17 August 1930; Husseren-Wesserling
- Occupation: Writer
- Notable work: Facing the Lion: Memoirs of a Young Girl in Nazi Europe
- Awards: Order of Merit of the Federal Republic of Germany
- Website: www.alst.org

Simone Maria (Arnold) Liebster (born 17 August 1930) is a French woman who was a victim of Nazi persecution during World War II as a member of Jehovah's Witnesses. Simone was also notable as the author of a book called Facing the lion—memoirs of a young girl In Nazi Europe in which she wrote about her experiences at the hands of the Nazis.

== Family ==
Liebster was born to Adolphe Arnold and Emma Borot in Husseren-Wesserling, Haut-Rhin. In 1933, the family moved to Mulhouse. She was baptized as a Jehovah's Witness in 1941.

In 1951, she travelled to New York to study at the Watchtower Bible School of Gilead, to become a missionary. She married Max Liebster, another survivor of Nazi persecution in 1956 and "together they have devoted their lives to their ministry and to peace education."

== Religious persecution ==
In July 1943, Liebster received a letter, from the German government, ordering her to report to the train station. She "was arrested by juvenile authorities, taken to Konstanz, Germany, and put in a Nazi penitentiary home. For nearly two years, Simone was forbidden to talk and was forced to do hard labor. Both her parents by this time had been imprisoned in Nazi camps, and none expected to live to see the family reunited. The end of the war arrived, though, and the Arnolds all returned home and rebuilt their lives."

== Award ==
- On December 15, 2023, Simone Arnold-Liebster was awarded the Order of Merit of the Federal Republic of Germany.

== Works ==
=== Filmography ===
- Jehovah's Witnesses Stand Firm Against Nazi Assault (1996)
- Taking the Stand: We Have More to Say (2016)
- The Schoolgirl The Nazis and The Purple Triangles (2018)

=== Books ===
- Arnold-Liebster, Simone (1999). Allein vor dem Löwen: Ein kleines Mädchen widersteht dem NS-Regime (in German). Edition Schortgen. ISBN 9782879539881.
  - ————————— (2000). Facing the Lion. Memoirs of a Young Girl in Nazi Europe. New Orleans: Grammaton Press. ISBN 9780967936659.
  - ————————— (2002). I løvens gab. en ung piges erindringer fra nazitiden (in Danish). Gramma. ISBN 9788798875413.
  - ————————— (2003). Sola di fronte al leone. una ragazzina resiste al regime nazista (in Italian). Edition Schortgen. ISBN 9782879539119.
  - ————————— (2003). Seule face au lion. une petite alsacienne résiste au régime nazi (in French). Edition Schortgen. ISBN 9782879534558.
  - ————————— (2004). Sola ante el león. Memorias de una niña en la Europa nazi (in Spanish). Edition Schortgen. ISBN 9782879539768.
  - ————————— (2007). Ensam mot lejonet. en berättelse av en ung flicka i det nazistiska Europa (in Swedish). Gramma. ISBN 9788791953026.
  - ————————— (2007). W paszczy lwa. mała dziewczynka stawia czoło reżimowi hitlerowskiemu (in Polish). Translated by Boczek, Aleksandra. Wydawnictwo A Propos, Ewa Głogowska. ISBN 9788392569503.
  - ————————— (2009). Silmätysten leijonan kanssa. nuoren tytön vaiheita natsi-Saksassa (in Finnish). Gramma. ISBN 9788791953118.
  - ————————— (2017-01-25). Enfrentando o leão: Memórias de uma Menina na Europa Nazi (in Portuguese). Edition Schortgen. ISBN 9782879530833.
  - ————————— (2019). 直面 “狮口”. 纳粹强权下的少女时代(缩写本) (in Simplified Chinese). Libreka GmbH. ISBN 9789995936839.
- Arnold-Liebster, Simone (2000). Study Guide for the Book Facing the Lion. Memoirs of a Young Girl in Nazi Europe. New Orleans: Grammaton Press.

=== Reception ===
Reviewing Liebster's book, Allein vor dem Löwen, philosopher and religious scientist Volker Zotz wrote: "The book as a historical document is significant in at least two ways. Once it provides an insight into the way in which the Nazi system tried to reeducate children. Then it provides a new source to a group of previously rather neglected Nazi victims, the Jehovah's Witnesses. But regardless of what gaps this book of historical research may conclude, it is of the highest interest as a personal testimony. How a child, under cruel conditions, preserves her inner dignity and her belief in God and the people, even though she knows her father in the concentration camp and her mother, even though she knows that close friends must die as conscientious objectors, is one in many ways challenging reading. The child can withstand the lion, as it feels the cruel Nazi machinery, because religious and ethical values give it an unconditional support."

Book reviews

- Zotz, Volker (October 2003). "Rezension zu Simone Arnold Liebster: Allein vor dem Löwen". Forum für Politik, Gesellschaft und Kultur (230): 45–46. ISSN 1680-2322.
- McCann, Gillian (2001). "Simone Arnold Liebster. Facing the Lion: Memoirs of a Young Girl in Nazi Europe. New Orleans: Grammaton Press, 2000. x + 369 pp. $29.95 (cloth), ISBN 978-0-9679366-5-9". H-Holocaust, H-Net Reviews. H-Net. Humanities & Social Sciences Online.

== Awards ==
- 2023, Order of Merit of the Federal Republic of Germany.
