= Hermine Liska =

- Born: Hermine Obweger; April 12, 1930; Carinthia, Austro-Hungarian Empire
- Died: July 1, 2024 (aged 94); Lieboch, Austria
- Known for: Jehovah's Witness victim of Nazi Germany

Hermine Liska (née Obweger; 12 April 1930 – 1 July 2024) was an Austrian woman who was persecuted as a child for her religious beliefs as a Jehovah's Witness. She was the last surviving Austrian witness of the persecution of Jehovah's Witnesses in Nazi Germany.

== As a child under the Nazi regime ==
Liska was born in St. Walburgen in Carinthia to a family of farmers. She had four older brothers.

Her father Johann Obweger (born 1886), had studied the Bible intensively while a Russian prisoner of war during the First World War and was convinced that this was how he had discovered differences between the teachings of the Bible and the teachings of the Catholic Church, to which he belonged. He had been missing for a long time due to the turmoil of the Russian Civil War, and did not return home until 1921. In 1922 he left the Catholic Church. Soon after, he came into contact with the Bible Student movement (later Jehovah's Witnesses) and joined this movement. As he and his family were therefore subjected to hostility in their Upper Carinthian home of Kleblach-Lind, he purchased the Lassnighof in St. Walburgen in 1928. Johann Obweger and his wife Elisabeth (born 1888) tried to raise their children in the teachings of Jehovah's Witnesses. Hermine later said: “They raised me from an early age in Christian teachings and instilled in me a love for God and his creation".

Hermine's eldest brother Johann Obweger Jr. (born 1914) refused military service due to his religious beliefs as a Jehovah's Witness after conscription was introduced in Austria in the mid-1930s. He was therefore sentenced to one year in prison in 1937.

As early as 1935, the activities of Jehovah's Witnesses had been banned in clerical fascist Austria. In 1938, after Austria's annexation to the German Reich, the situation for Jehovah's Witnesses became critical as they rejected the state's claim to absolute power and felt primarily obliged to obey God. At 8 years old she refused to give the Nazi salute and was therefore demoted in elementary school and received the worst grade for behaviour.

There were repeated house searches at the family home as the authorities suspected that there was banned literature from Jehovah's Witnesses at the farm and that religious meetings had been taking place there.

As his daughter continued to refuse to give the salute in elementary school, her father Johann Obweger was asked before the court in St. Veit an der Glan to confirm that he would raise Hermine in the spirit of the National Socialist movement. He refused to do so, whereupon the parents' custody of Hermine was withdrawn. In February 1941, when she was almost 11 years old, Hermine was taken to a Nazi re-education home in Waiern near Feldkirchen in Kärnten. There, too, she refused to give the Hitler salute or wear the jacket of the League of German Girls. As a result, she was not allowed to move on to secondary school, despite her good academic performance. Because Hermine's persistent refusal to conform to the Nazi regime led to it being assumed that she was still secretly in contact with her parents, she was transferred to the Adelgundenheim in Munich in September 1942. In April 1944, Hermine was released home. In May 1944, she was baptized as a Jehovah's Witness on her parents' farm. Jehovah's Witnesses practice believer's baptism by complete immersion. A few days later, she had to leave her parents again because, contrary to usual practice, she was not allowed to do the so-called compulsory year on her parents' farm, but had to work in Köttmannsdorf. In May 1945, Hermine was finally allowed to return to her parents in St. Walburgen.

== Persecution of Jehovah's Witnesses ==
Hermine's brother Hans Obweger Jr. (born 1914), who had already refused military service, was forced to do mining from 1941, first in Eisenerz, and from March 1942 in Sittenberg. At the end of 1944 he was called up to the Volkssturm, but refused to comply for reasons of conscience. On 2 January 1945 he was arrested and taken to the Dachau concentration camp on 26 January 1945. He had to work in a penal company in the Kottern-Weidach subcamp and contracted typhus. Having lost weight from 80 to 47 kg, he experienced the liberation of the Dachau concentration camp at the end of April and returned home at the end of June 1945.

Hermine's other brother Franz Obweger (born 1926) refused to join the Reich Labour Service and therefore served a year in the Vienna-Kaiserebersdorf youth prison. He was released from prison at the beginning of April 1945; in the following weeks until the end of the war he hid at the Lassnighof together with the Judenburg Jehovah's Witness Hans König in order to avoid being drafted into the Wehrmacht.

Hermine's father Hans Obweger was drafted into the Volkssturm at the end of 1944. Because he refused to comply with the call-up for reasons of conscience, he was arrested on 2 January 1945 and transferred to Klagenfurt. Although he was threatened with being sent to a concentration camp, he continued to refuse military service. After three weeks he was released as unfit for prison.

The Obweger family had taken in other Jehovah's Witnesses at the Lassnighof who had encountered difficulties with the Nazi state because of their faith, including Richard Heide Jr. (born 1902) from Klagenfurt and his son Gerhard (born 1932). Richard Heide had been dismissed from the postal service because of his membership of Jehovah's Witnesses and had lost his official residence. At the beginning of 1942, Richard Heide received a draft order for the Wehrmacht; he was sentenced to 18 months in prison for refusing to perform military service. He was deprived of custody of his son Gerhard: "It is dangerous to leave him ( Gerhard) in the care of his father, since he forbids his son from giving the Hitler salute and singing the songs of the nation." Gerhard was initially placed in the care of National Socialist-minded relatives, then in a children's home in Nikolsdorf near Lienz until the end of the war.

The Jehovah's Witness Anton Dorner Jr. (born 1923 in Himmelberg) worked for a time at the Lassnighof with the Obweger family during the time of National Socialist rule. In March 1942 he was drafted into the Wehrmacht. He declared that he could not perform military service due to his religious beliefs, whereupon he was sentenced to death in Berlin for undermining the Wehrmacht . The sentence was carried out on 27 January 1943 in the Brandenburg-Görden Prison.

The Jehovah's Witness Leonhard Rutter (born 1899 in Glantschach) worked as a farm labourer for the Obweger family. Because he did not comply with the draft order to join the Wehrmacht because of his religious beliefs, he was arrested at the Lassnighof in 1944 and transferred to the Dachau concentration camp on 11 October 1944, where he died on 21 February 1945.

== After the war ==
From 1947 to 1949, Hermine attended the women's vocational school in Klagenfurt, but later dropped out to help on her parents' farm because her mother was ill.

In 1950, she met Erich Liska, a man from Vienna who was then working as a traveling preacher for Jehovah's Witnesses. In 1952, Erich and Hermine were married. Hermine accompanied her husband for several months on his visits from congregation to congregation of Jehovah's Witnesses. The couple then had three children. As a housewife she continued to be active as a Jehovah's Witness.

== Activities as a contemporary witness ==
From 1998, Hermine Liska campaigned for the remembrance of Nazi atrocities. From 2002, as a contemporary witness recognized by the Ministry of Education, she visited schools throughout Austria and told her story to more than 180,000 students over the years. The Ministry of Education wrote to Hermine Liska in 2006: "Your personal work has contributed immensely to a climate of tolerance and acceptance and to an approach to the terrible history of National Socialism and the Holocaust that is accessible to young people. You have made a particularly valuable contribution to the debate. On behalf of the Department of Political Education, we would like to invite you to continue to make your experiences available to schools and students".

In 2009, in cooperation with the Ministry of Education, a film documentary of her life story was produced, the use of which was recommended by the Ministry of Education for history lessons.

In 2011, the magazine Awake! printed her life story, which was published in 83 languages in a circulation of about 39,000,000 copies. In 2015, she was one of nine interviewees for Bernhard Rammerstorfer's book and DVD Taking the Stand: We have More to Say. In the fall of 2015, Hermine Liska toured the United States and told her life story at American universities such as Stanford University, Harvard University and Boston College.

In 2016, she was awarded the Golden Decoration of Medal of Honor of the State of Styria and the Golden Decoration of Merit of the Republic of Austria for her work as a contemporary witness.

In a radio interview, Hermine Liska answered the question whether she had a message for today's youth as follows: "For me, faith was a great help in standing together as a family. Today, I observe with great concern that families are breaking up more and more because the unifying bond of the Christian faith is missing. My message to today's youth would be: don't believe everything and everyone. Question things and follow your conscience. Don't throw the morals and principles of Christian thought overboard just because something else is fashionable. Remember one thing: those who shout loudly usually have nothing to say".

== Literature ==
- Ich ließ mich nicht umerziehen. Erzählt von Hermine Liska, in Erwachet! 8/2011, S. 18–20.
- Liska Hermine. Zeugin Jehovas, Predigerin und Gegnerin des NS-Regimes. in: Elise Erika Korotin: BiografiA. Lexikon österreichischer Frauen, Böhlau 2016. S. 2002.
- Gerti Malle: „Für alles bin ich stark durch den, der mir Kraft verleiht“ Widerstand und Verfolgung der Zeugen Jehovas in der Zeit des Nationalsozialismus in Kärnten. Kitab, Klagenfurt und Wien 2011. S. 75–84, 122f, 154.
- Bernhard Rammerstorfer: Im Zeugenstand. Was wir noch sagen sollten. Herzogsdorf 2012. S. 291–332.
- Gerti Malle: Jehovas Zeugen in Österreich. Die Verfolgungsgeschichte einer religiösen Minderheit. in: Gerhard Besier, Katarzyna Stokłosa: Jehovas Zeugen in Europa – Geschichte und Gegenwart. Band 3 (= Studien zur Kirchlichen Zeitgeschichte, Band 7). Lit, Berlin 2018. S. 417ff.

== Film ==
- Lila Winkel Association and Federal Ministry of Education and the Arts: Hermine Liska - Educational problems of a dictator. 2009.
