= Declaration of Facts =

Controversial public document issued by Jehovah's Witnesses

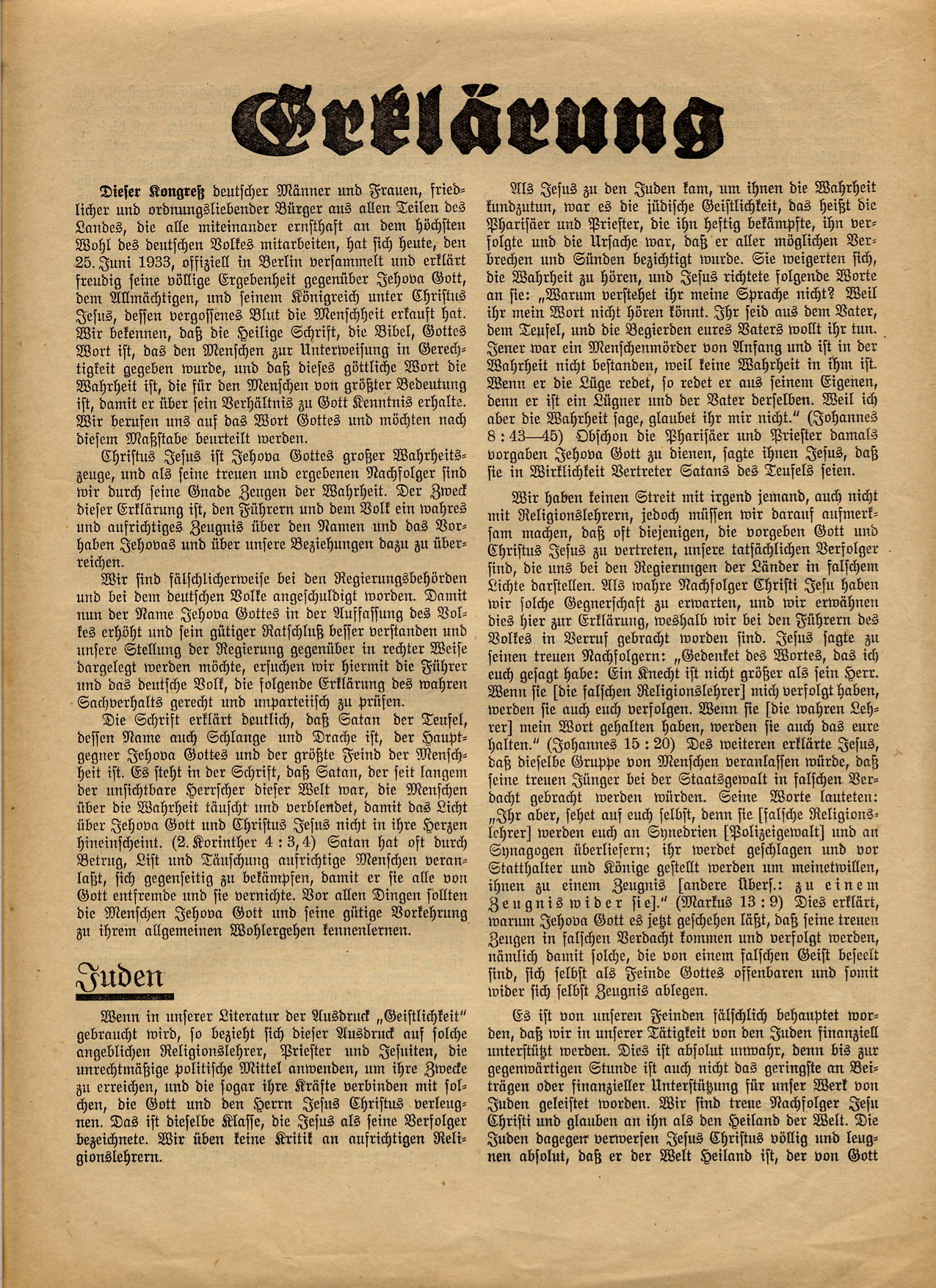
Wilmersdorfer Erklärung of 25 June 1933 (page 1)

The Declaration of Facts was a widely distributed public statement issued by Jehovah's Witnesses during the period of persecution of the group in Nazi Germany. The document asserted the denomination's political neutrality, appealed for the right to publicly preach, and claimed the Witnesses were the victims of a misinformation campaign by other churches. It was prepared by Watch Tower Society president Joseph F. Rutherford and released at a convention in Berlin on June 25, 1933. More than 2.1 million copies of the statement were distributed throughout Germany, with copies also mailed to senior government officials including German Chancellor Adolf Hitler. Its distribution prompted a new wave of persecution against German Witnesses.

The declaration is controversial among Jehovah's Witnesses and historians. It stated that Jehovah's Witnesses shared the same ethical goals as the Nazi party, and it attacked Hitler's enemies: Jews, Catholics, the United States, Britain and France. The declaration was first read at the 1933 District Convention of Jehovah's Witnesses in Berlin and was later distributed to the public as a pamphlet. Historian Detlef Garbe, however, stated that this claim is incorrect because it is based on a misunderstanding.

== Background ==
From 1922, German Bible Students (Ernste Bibelforscher) were arrested on charges of illegal peddling as they publicly distributed Watch Tower Society literature. Between 1927 and 1930, almost 5,000 charges were laid against members of the group, and although most ended in acquittals some "severe sentences" were also handed down. In November 1931 Bavarian authorities used new emergency ordinances relating to political disturbances to confiscate and ban Watch Tower Society literature. By the end of 1932 more than 2,300 charges against Bible Students were pending.

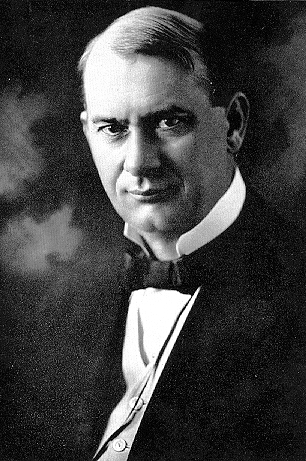
Watch Tower Society president J. F. Rutherford

Restrictions tightened with the appointment of Adolf Hitler as Germany's new Chancellor on January 30, 1933. On February 4 he issued a decree permitting the police to confiscate literature "endangering public order and security" and also restrict freedoms of assembly. By mid-1933 the work of the group–by then known as Jehovah's witnesses–had been banned in most German states, with members accused of being Communists and associating with the Jews in subversive political movements. Members' homes were frequently searched by police for incriminating literature and on April 24 the International Bible Students Association (IBSA) headquarters in Magdeburg was briefly occupied by police.

Authorities objected to the influence of religious minorities such as Jehovah's Witnesses because they "contributed to the ideological fragmentation of the German people", but they also viewed the group as a threat to the mainstream Christian denominations. A Ministry of the Interior decree stated:

Particularly on Sundays and Christian holidays, people sent by the "Earnest Bible Students" go from house to house and bother people by imposing upon them the journals of the Magdeburg Watch Tower Bible and Tract Society, which contain malicious attacks on the major Christian churches and their institutions ... This demoralizing activity, which represents a misuse of the right to freedom of expression, causes dissension not only in individual families but also in entire communities. It is incompatible with the idea of a Christian people's community in Germany and can therefore no longer be permitted.

In June Watch Tower Society president Joseph Rutherford and Nathan Knorr traveled to Berlin to attempt to negotiate the possibilities of continuing preaching activity in Germany. While there, they organized a public convention to be held in Berlin on June 25, 1933 to release a Declaration of Facts, which had been written by Rutherford. They hoped the document would convince Hitler, government officials and the public that Jehovah's Witnesses posed no threat to the German people and the state.

Both Rutherford and Knorr left Germany before the convention, held at the Wilmersdorfer Tennishallen, began. Though organizers expected an attendance of 5,000, a crowd of 7,000 arrived. To the surprise of those attending, the convention opened with a song, Zion's Glorious Hope, which was by then rarely sung at Witness meetings. Set to music composed by Joseph Haydn in 1797, it had been in the Bible Students' songbook since 1905, but avoided since 1922, when the same music was used with new lyrics for the German national anthem. During the convention, the 3,800-word Declaration of Facts was presented to the crowd.

Some 2.5 million copies of The Declaration, reproduced as a four-page pamphlet, were distributed publicly and a day after the convention, the declaration was sent to Hitler with a seven-page cover letter written by Balzereit in which he assured the Chancellor that the IBSA "was not in opposition to the national government of the German Reich". The letter added that, to the contrary, "the entirely religious, nonpolitical objectives and efforts of the Bible Students" were "completely in agreement with the corresponding goals of the national government". Historian Detlef Garbe concluded that by using subtle wording, Balzereit intended that the letter, while representing the Bible Students' teachings, could also be misinterpreted by the group's opponents.

== Aftermath ==
Within days of sending the Declaration to Hitler, Balzereit left Germany and emigrated to Prague. On June 28, 30 Nazi Party storm troopers raided the Magdeburg offices for a second time, hoisting the swastika above the building, closing the factory, sealing the presses and locking the premises. The Ministry of the Interior said the action was designed to prohibit any future activities of the Watch Tower Society in Germany. In late August, authorities transported about 70 tonnes of Watch Tower literature and Bibles in 25 trucks to the city's outskirts and publicly burned them. In some areas the Witnesses defied the ban on their preaching activity, but throughout Germany many believers withdrew from the association and ceased all activity. When copies of the Watchtower and Golden Age began to arrive in Germany by mail from abroad, police ordered the confiscation of mail of known Jehovah's Witnesses.

In September 1934 a thousand German Jehovah's Witnesses joined a crowd of 3,500 at an international convention in Basel, Switzerland, organized under the theme "Fear Them Not". Rutherford urged the German Jehovah's Witnesses to resume their preaching activity and the attendees responded by declaring in a resolution that they would do so on October 7, 1934, regardless of the ban. The resolution also contained a message of protest against their treatment in Germany. The resolution was given to the Swiss press and a copy sent to Hitler, along with a message that read: "Your ill-treatment of Jehovah's Witnesses shocks all people on earth and dishonors God's name. Refrain from further persecution of Jehovah's Witnesses; otherwise God will destroy you and your national party." Thousands of telegrams containing the same warning were sent to the Reich government in Berlin from Witnesses in Europe, the United States and Britain on October 8 and 9 until foreign post offices were told to stop sending them because the recipient refused to accept them.

Balzereit later returned to Germany to resume his position as branch leader, but attracted criticism from some members over his reluctance to defy bans on public preaching. In May 1935 he—along with eight other officers—was arrested; at a trial in December that year he denied he had defied official decrees, but was sentenced to 2½ years imprisonment. The following year he was expelled from the Watch Tower Society, with Rutherford explaining in a letter to German Witnesses that he was surprised "not one of those on trial at that time gave a faithful and true testimony to the name of Jehovah". Rutherford said Balzereit had said nothing to show "his complete reliance on Jehovah" and the Society therefore "will henceforth have nothing to do with him". The Society would also "put forth no effort in seeking to release them from prison even if it had the power to do anything".

== Historical analysis ==
German historian Detlef Garbe believes that the Declaration of Facts was part of the group's efforts to adapt at a time of increasing persecution. He said the use of the Zion's Glorious Hope hymn at the opening of the Berlin convention was intended to leave a good impression to outsiders by sharing the same melody as the German national anthem. He also noted that the wording of the document presented the denomination as an organization with a positive attitude towards the German state that held common interests with it. Garbe said that in repudiating accusations that the Witnesses had received financial support from the Jews, the group "clearly distanced itself from another group under persecution". He noted the use of "anti-Jewish slogans" in the document, which was written less than three months after the boycott of Jewish stores in Germany, but did not consider the Witnesses to be antisemitic. Garbe said later publications of the Watch Tower Society had misrepresented the Declaration of Facts as a "resolution of protest" and had also falsely claimed that Balzereit had "watered down" its publications in his translation of Rutherford's original document. He said the criticism of Balzereit in the Witnesses' 1974 Yearbook was an attempt to place responsibility on the German branch leader for the religion's attempts to adapt. Garbe said the Declaration's description of the Anglo-American empire as "the most oppressive empire on earth" also undermines the group's claims to political neutrality.

Canadian historian James Penton believes that the Declaration of Facts reinforces antisemitic tropes, in particular with its focus on denouncing Jews for controlling the economy and their role in Jesus' death. He also notes that statements about Jews mirrors those made in Hitler's Mein Kampf, Joseph Goebbels' 1927 essay Wir fordern, and others published by Julius Streicher. Penton's book, Jehovah's Witnesses and the Third Reich, was criticized by Garbe, who argued that his interpretation reflected an aversion against his former religion and that his writing lacked objectivity. Scholar Kevin Spicer identified some issues with the book in his analysis but also stated that "Penton has alerted the reader to the reality that the Jehovah's Witnesses, like most Christians, embraced some form of nationalism and anti-Semitism, especially in the early years of Hitler's reign."

Religious scholar Gabriele Yonan does not consider the Declaration of Facts to be an attempt to curry favour with Hitler, noting that it did not address Hitler as "Fuhrer" and did not conclude with the words "Heil Hitler", in contrast to other official church documents addressed to state authorities. Yonan did not consider the work to be antisemitic as it lacked references to terminology common in antisemitic works of that era such as "Zion". Penton considers her book, Jehovah's Witnesses – Victims under Two German Dictatorships, to be apologetic in nature and says that her arguments are "virtually identical" to the official stance of the Watch Tower Bible and Tract Society.

== See also ==
- Bibliography of works on Jehovah's Witnesses
