= Purple triangle =

Badge used in Nazi concentration camps to identify Jehovah's Witnesses

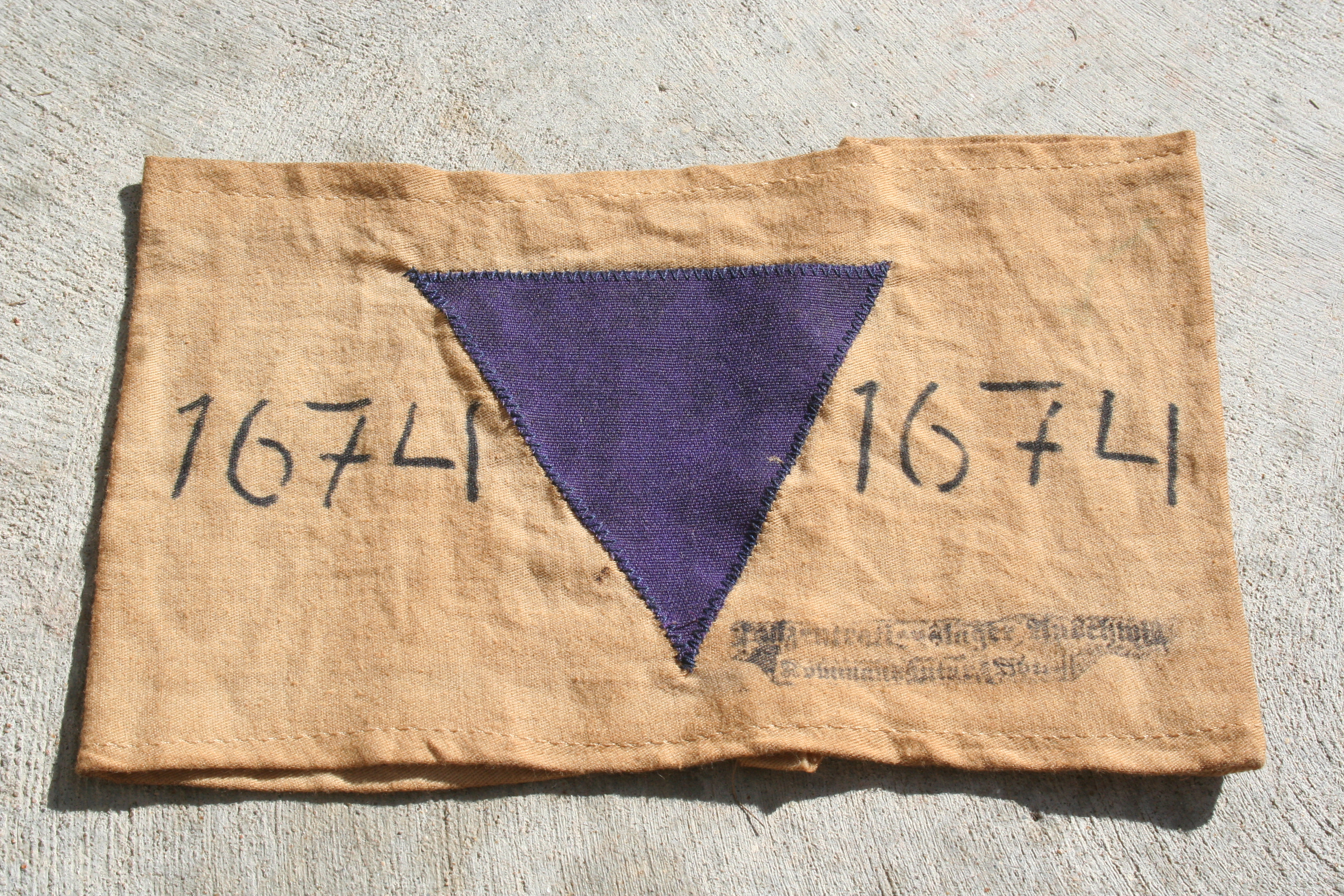
Purple triangle

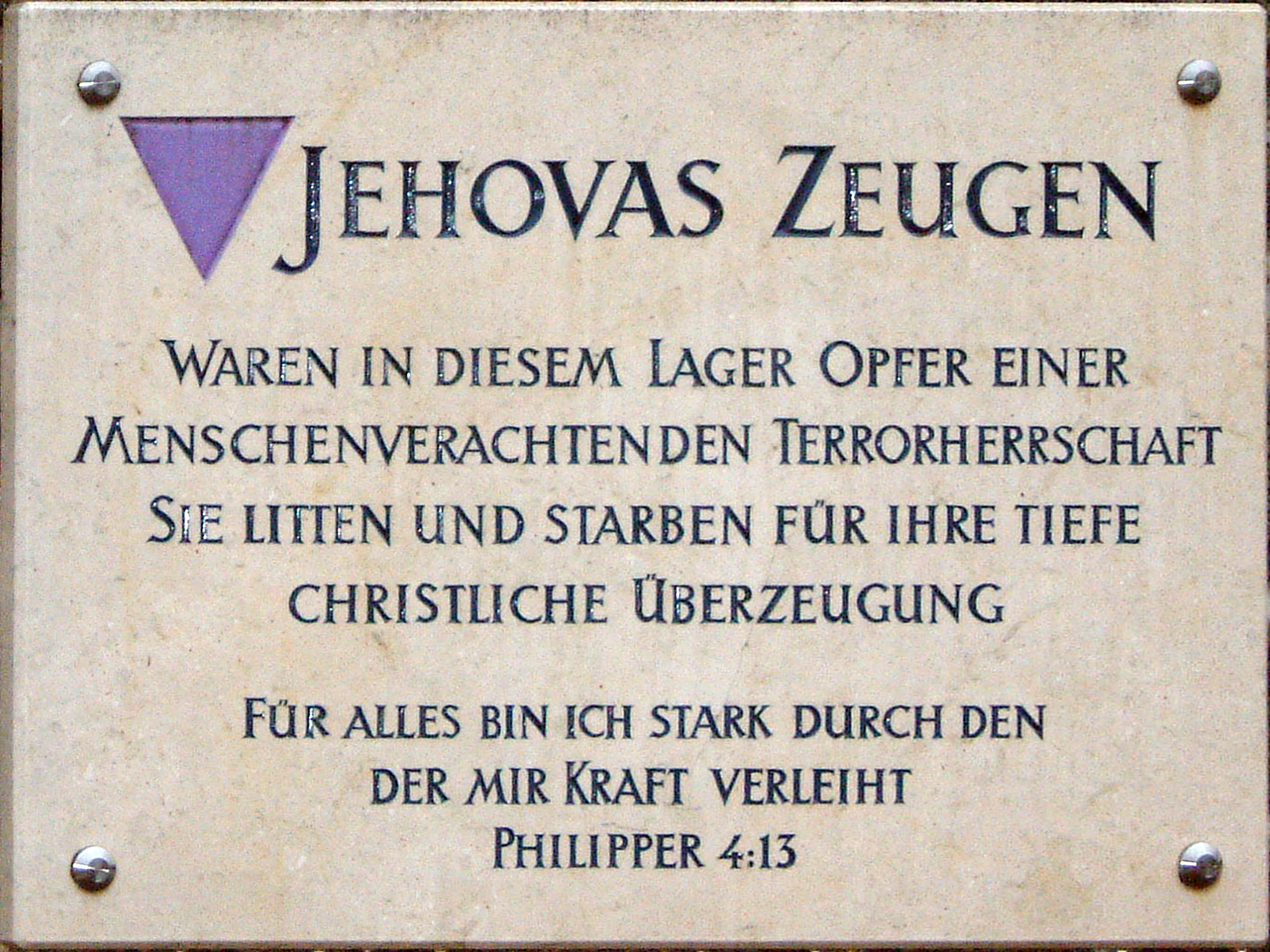
Commemorative plaque at Mauthausen camp recalling the persecution of Jehovah's Witnesses ("Zeugen Jehovas" in German)

The purple triangle was a concentration camp badge used by the Nazis to identify Bibelforscher (that is Bible Student movement and Jehovah's Witnesses) in Nazi Germany. The purple triangle was introduced in July 1936 with other concentration camps such as those of Dachau and Buchenwald following in 1937 and 1938. In the winter of 1935–36, before the onset of the war, Jehovah's Witnesses have been reported to make up 20–40% of the prisoners in concentration camps, or about 600 to 1000 total. Although Jehovah's Witnesses made up the vast majority of those wearing the purple triangle (over 99%), a few members of other small pacifist religious groups were also included.

== Background ==
Jehovah's Witnesses came into conflict with the Nazi regime because they refused to use the Hitler salute, which conflicted with their beliefs. Because refusing to use the Hitler salute was considered a crime, they were arrested, and their children attending school were expelled, detained and separated from their families. When Germany made military enlistment mandatory, they were persecuted because they refused to bear arms. Being politically neutral, they also refused to vote in the elections.

Based on the Nuremberg Laws, those who were also classified as ethnic Jews wore a badge comprising a purple triangle superimposed on a yellow triangle.

== See also ==
- Nazi concentration camp badges
  - Black triangle (badge)
  - Brown triangle
  - P (Nazi symbol)
  - Pink triangle
  - Red triangle (badge)
  - Yellow badge
- Persecution of Jehovah's Witnesses in Nazi Germany
- Religion in Nazi Germany
- Identification in Nazi camps
