= Parc de Wesserling =

Town private garden

Coordinates: 47°53′04.55″N 6°59′57.14″E

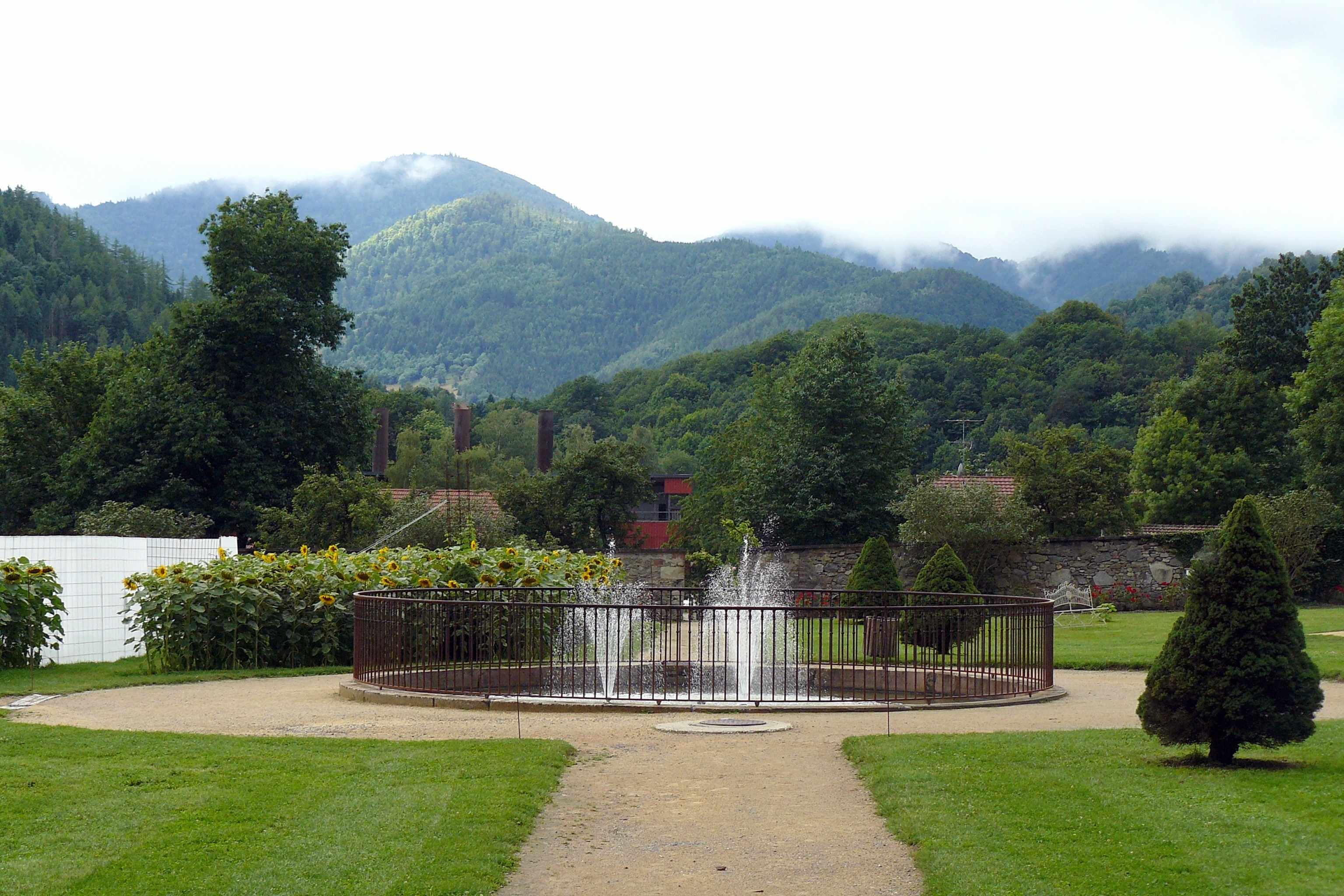
Gardens at the Wesserling Park

The Parc de Wesserling is a private garden located in the town of Husseren-Wesserling, in the department of Haut-Rhin, in the Alsace Region of France. It is classified by the French Ministry of Culture as one of the Notable Gardens of France.

The park is located at the site of the hunting lodge of the prince-abbey of Murbach (1699), and is composed of formal French gardens, an English park, a kitchen garden, a field garden, and a contemporary statuary garden. Trees include a giant sequoia, Virginia tulip, red oak, cypress, linden and maple, plus acacia and many kinds of seasonal flowers.
