= Max Liebster =

Holocaust survivor, author

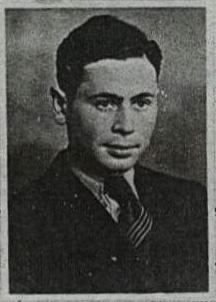
- Photo of Max Liebster included in Nazi files
- Born: 15 February 1915; Reichenbach
- Died: 28 May 2008; Aix-les-Bains
- Spouse: Simone Arnold Liebster

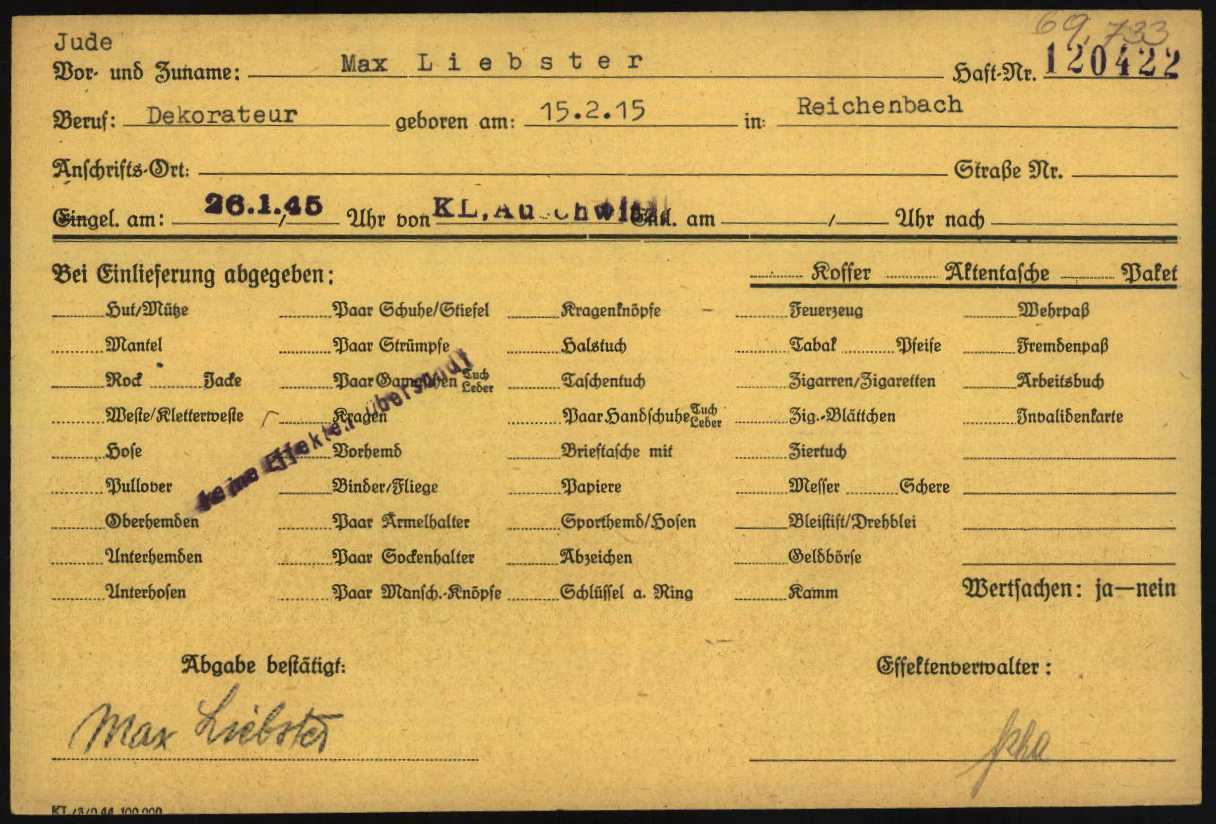
List of personal effects of Max Liebster as a prisoner at Buchenwald Nazi Concentration Camp, after his transfer from Auschwitz

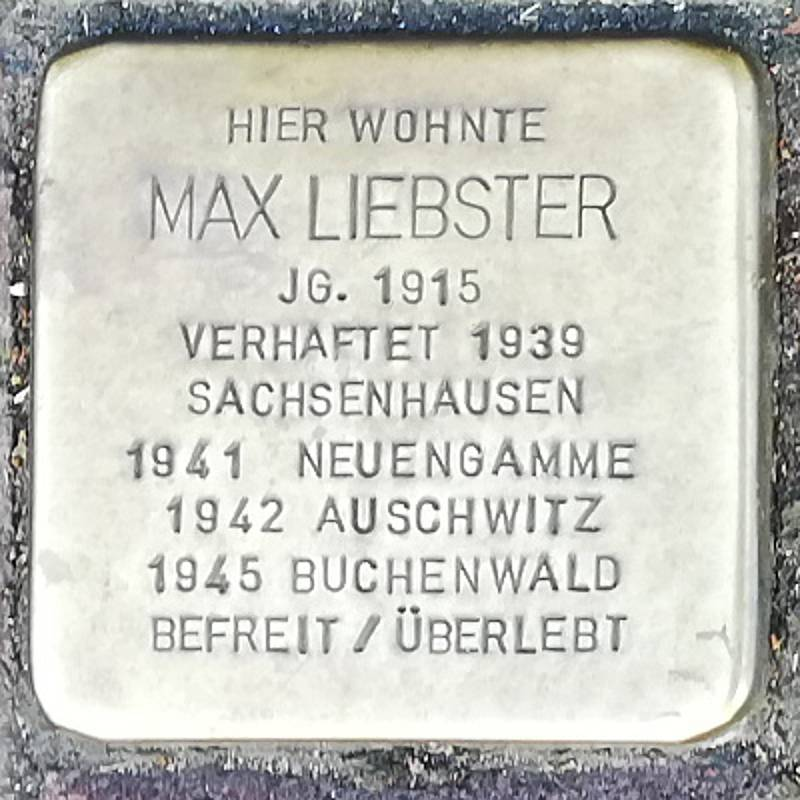
Stolpersteine

Max Liebster (15 February 1915 – 28 May 2008) was a German-born victim of Nazi persecution during World War II due to his Jewish race and religion. During his imprisonment in four concentration camps (Sachsenhausen, Neuengamme, Auschwitz, Buchenwald) he studied the Bible with fellow inmates that were Jehovah’s Witnesses and converted to their religion, baptized in a bathtub at Buchenwald. Liebster is also notable as the author of the book Crucible of Terror: A Story of Survival Through the Nazi Storm.

== Family ==
Liebster was born to Beirech "Bernhard" Liebster and Bertha Oppenheimer in Reichenbach, a part of Lautertal (Odenwald). In 1947, Liebster emigrated to America and petitioned to become an American Citizen in 1953. In 1956, he married Simone Arnold, another survivor of Nazi persecution.

== Works ==
- Liebster, Max (1992). L'espérance a raison du désespoir. France: M. Liebster. OCLC 37334062.
- Liebster, Max (2003). Hoffnungsstrahl im Nazisturm. Geschichte eines Holocaustüberlebenden. Schortgen. ISBN 9782879539904.
- Liebster, Max (2003). Crucible of Terror: A Story of Survival Through the Nazi Storm. Grammaton Press. ISBN 9780967936628.
- Liebster, Max (2006). Nyt livsmod under nazismens raedsler. Gramma. ISBN 9788799012589.
- Liebster, Max (2007). В горниле ужаса. рассказ человека, прошедшего через фашистский террор : [пер. с англ.] Особая кн. ISBN 9785979700038.
- Liebster, Max (2007). Un Crisol de Terror. La Historia de Un Superviviente Durante la Barbarie Nazi. Reliures Schortgen. ISBN 9782879530437.
- Liebster, Max (2007). En tillflykt i stormen. en berättelse om hopp och mod under nazistisk terror. Gramma. ISBN 9788791953033.
- Liebster, Max (2010). Turvapaikka keskellä myrskyä. Gramma. ISBN 9788791953163.
- Liebster, Max (2018). Lueur dans la tourmente. récit d'un survivant de l'holocauste. Editions Schortgen SARL. ISBN 9789995936600.
