= Husseren-Wesserling =

Commune in Grand Est, France

- Commune
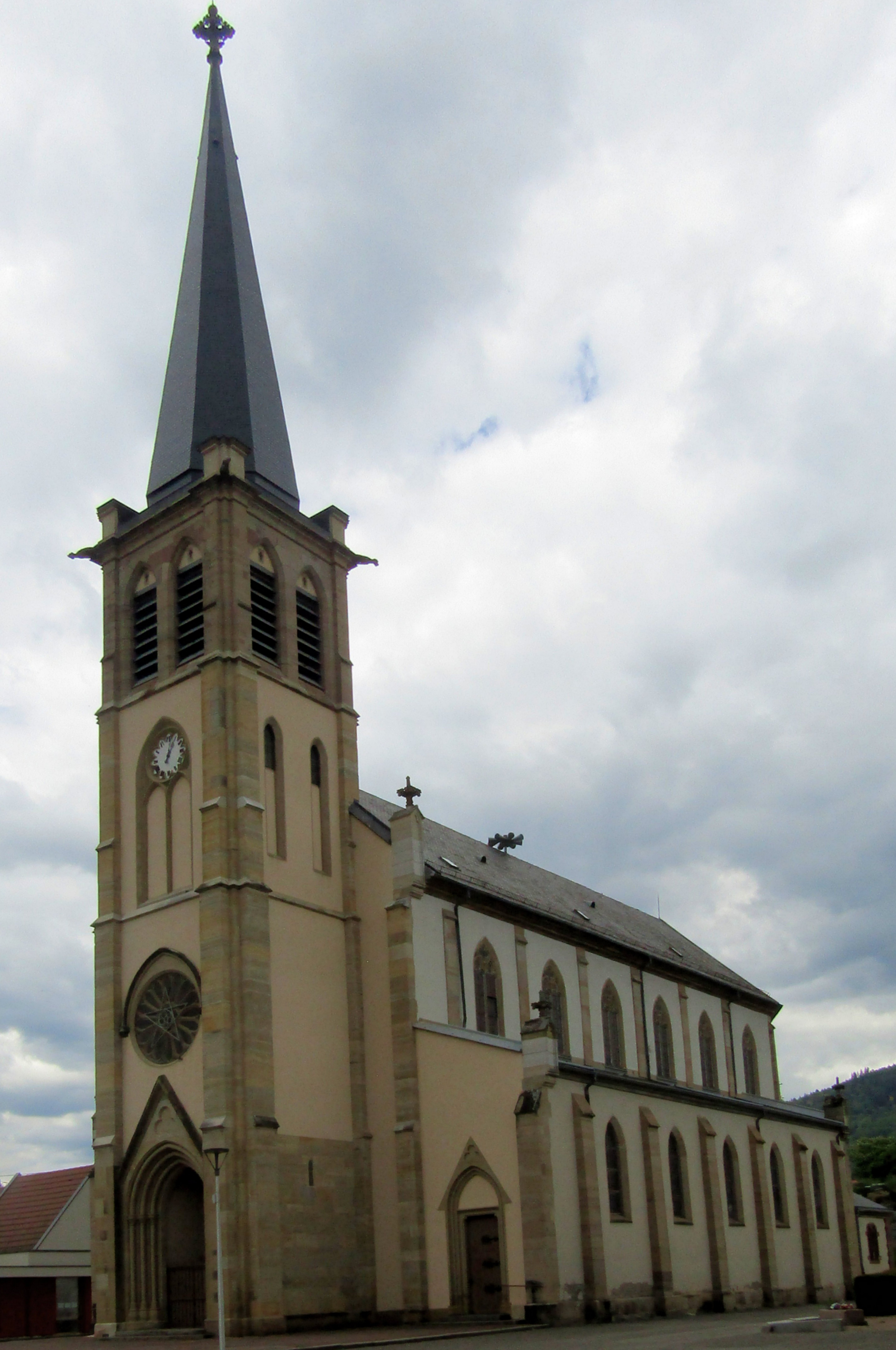
- The church in Husseren-Wesserling

- Coat of arms
- Location of Husseren-Wesserling
- Location within France Location within Grand Est
- Coordinates: 47°52′53″N 6°59′09″E
- Country: France
- Region: Grand Est
- Department: Haut-Rhin
- Arrondissement: Thann-Guebwiller
- Canton: Cernay
- Intercommunality: Vallée de Saint-Amarin

Government
  - Mayor (2020–2026): Romain Nuccelli
- Area^{1}: 5.09 km^{2} (1.97 sq mi)
- Elevation: 440 m (1,440 ft)
- Highest elevation: 840 m (2,760 ft)
- Lowest elevation: 415 m (1,362 ft)
- Population (2023): 1,022
  - Density: 201/km^{2} (520/sq mi)
- Time zone: UTC+01:00 (CET)
  - Summer (DST): UTC+02:00 (CEST)
- INSEE/Postal code: 68151 /68470
- ^{1} French Land Register data, which excludes lakes, ponds, glaciers > 1 km^{2} (0.386 sq mi or 247 acres) and river estuaries.

Husseren-Wesserling (German: Hüsseren-Wesserling) is a commune in the Haut-Rhin department in Grand Est in north-eastern France.

== Points of interest ==
- Parc de Wesserling

== See also ==
- Communes of the Haut-Rhin département
