= Piotr Szarek =

Polish clergyman

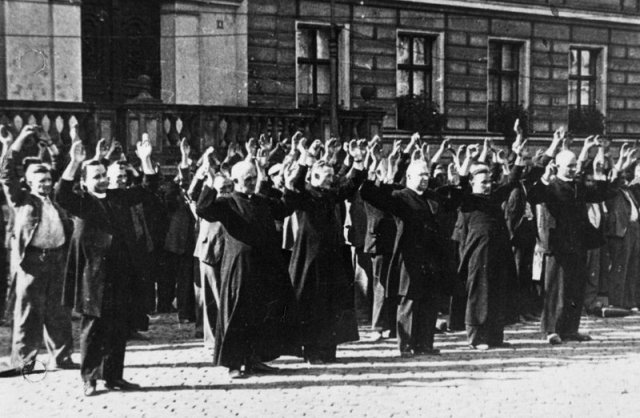
Public execution by the Nazis of Polish hostages in Bydgoszcz's Old Market Square, 9 September 1939

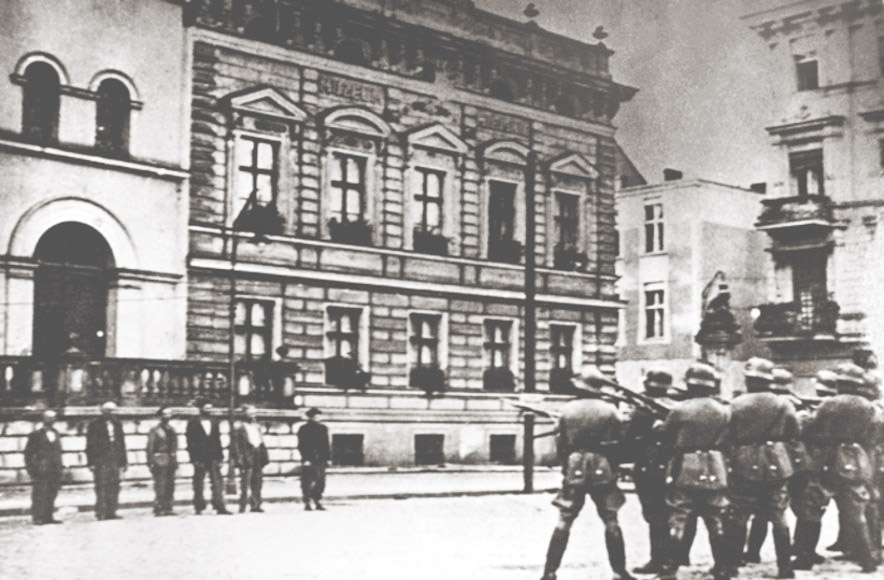
The moment of death; Bydgoszcz's Old Market Square, 9 September 1939

Piotr Szarek (7 May 1908 – 9 September 1939) was a Polish Catholic clergyman, and a member of the Congregation of the Missionwho was publicly murdered by the Nazis on the ninth day of the Second World War.

He has in recent years been accorded the title of Servant of God and is in the process of being beatified by the Catholic Church.

== Life and death ==
Szarek was born on 7 May 1908 (not 5 May as sometimes indicated) at the village of Złotniki in Congress Poland (Kielce Governorate) when the area was under Russian occupation. He joined the Lazarists on 14 October 1926, at the age of 18, already in independent Poland, and received holy orders on 3 June 1934. He then went to Bydgoszcz, a major centre of the Lazarists in Poland, to pursue his ministry. One of his functions included directing the church choir Vincentinum in Bydgoszcz.

Szarek left the premises of his religious institute in Bydgoszcz on Saturday, 9 September 1939, in company with another priest, Stanisław Wiórek (1912–1939) who had just returned from Rome, in order to complete the required formalities of registration with the authorities imposed on the population by the Nazis after the invasion of Poland. While in a street outside, they were both caught in a łapanka, a random rounding-up of Polish hostages in reprisal for what the Nazi propaganda portrayed as anti-German events of the so-called Bloody Sunday of 3 September 1939, six days earlier. The randomly detained passers-by were brought to Bydgoszcz's historic Old Market Square (the Stary Rynek), a prominent central place where they were displayed and harassed before twenty-five of them were summarily executed by a firing squad in public, in front of the Municipal Museum (the building in the background of the photographs to the right), at about 12 noon. Szarek was killed together with his younger companion Stanisław Wiórek, who had just obtained a doctorate in Rome. Szarek was 31-years' old.

The highest German official appointed by the Nazis over the city of Bydgoszcz was on 9 September 1939 generalmajor and SS-brigadeführer Walter Braemer, who bears the ultimate responsibility for all actions of the German military in the area at the time, but the research conducted by the German historian Jochen Böhler has recently established that the execution was actually carried out by the Einsatzkommando 1/IV commanded by the SS-sturmbannführer Helmut Bischoff, who was supported in his operation on that day by Arthur Mülverstedt, an SS leader.

According to several published accounts, Szarek had shown signs of life after the salvo of shots rang out, and was individually murdered afterwards. The bodies were displayed in the Old Market Square for six hours, from about 12 noon to 6 p.m., as an intimidating measure to terrorize the town's population.

Cardinal August Józef Hlond, the wartime primate of Poland, notified Pope Pius XII of the Nazi war crime (in a personal meeting held at the Vatican on 20 September 1939), highlighting in particular the tortures meted out to Szarek:

[His] eye-glasses had first been knocked into his face by the Germans and his nose broken by blows from the butts of their guns; his jaw was broken, his eyes knocked out, his collar-bone broken, and at last he was killed.

Independently, the Government of the Republic of Poland in Exile presented the details of the crime to the international community in the so-called The Black Book of Poland where it is noted that Szarek in particular had "suffered cruelly" ("His nasal bone was fractured, his spectacles broken and his eyes put out, as it seems; his jawbone broken and hanging, and one arm broken"). The year after his murder, the details of Szarek's death appeared in a book written by the British author Gertrude M. Godden and prefaced by Cardinal Arthur Hinsley, the Archbishop of Westminster, who opined that

the death of Father Szarek, news of which came during the third week in January [sc. 1940], should be made known in all civilised countries as (...) [an example] of Nazi rule.

The news of Szarek's murder was released by the Vatican and publicized around the world, from The New York Times – which on 25 January 1940 carried the article of Herbert Matthews in Rome entitled "Vatican Continues Atrocity Charges: Report on Poland Gives Names of Priests who Have Been Murdered", which article was sourced to "authorized Vatican circles close to the Secretariat of State" – to a provincial monthly The DeAndrein of Perryville, Missouri, which in its March 1940 edition carried the article "Hell on Earth" on the first page. On 30 January 1940 The New York Times published the entire text of Cardinal Hlond's original report to the Pope on Nazi persecutions in Poland, which discusses Szarek's case. However, in a series of reports issued in 1942 by the Inter-Allied Information Committee, Szarek was reported to have been buried while still alive. (Indeed, according to a deposition given after the War by the Sikorski family who performed the functions of caretakers of the Bydgoszcz cemetery while secretly recording all deaths due to Nazi repressions, among the bodies of the victims of the 9 September 1939 massacre dumped at the cemetery by the Nazis off a platform truck, two showed signs of life.)

Szarek's and Wiórek's murders were reported in the Polish underground press as early as June 1940, when a notice appeared in a special edition of the underground weekly newspaper Pobudka ("The Reveille"; see Pobudka). In a post-War newspaper article published in April 1945 in a Kraków daily, the Dziennik Polski, the details of the execution and of Szarek's death were characterized as "too gruesome to be enumerated in print" (tak potworne, iż trudno je wyliczać).

There is also the eyewitness account of Szarek's maryrdom given by Helena Kozłowska, a pharmacist who was working at the time in the Stary Rynek (Old Market Square). Szarek's body, together with that of Wiórek, is buried in the Cemetery of the Heroes of Bydgoszcz (Cmentarz Bohaterów Bydgoszczy) in Bydgoszcz.

Piotr Szarek is currently one of the 122 Polish martyrs of the Second World War who are included in the beatification process initiated in 1994, whose first beatification session was held in Warsaw in 2003 (see Słudzy Boży).

Szarek's likeness is depicted pictorially in the stained-glass windows of the Church of Saint Mary Immaculate Revealing the Miraculous Medal located in the Olcza district of the city of Zakopane (the Parafia Najświętszej Maryi Panny Niepokalanej Objawiającej Cudowny Medalik).

== See also ==
- Bloody Sunday (1939)
- Intelligenzaktion Pommern
- Valley of Death (Bydgoszcz)
- 108 Martyrs of World War II
- List of Servants of God

== Notes and references ==
- Picture of Piotr Szarek with a complete list of Polish Martyrs
- A brief biography of Szarek by the Polish Vincentians

== Bibliography ==
- G. M. Godden, Poland: Yesterday, To-day, To-morrow... With a Foreword by His Eminence Cardinal Hinsley, Archbishop of Westminster..., London, Burns & Oates, 1940, pages ix–x. Google Books
- August Hlond, The Persecution of the Catholic Church in German-occupied Poland: Reports presented by H. E. Cardinal Hlond, Primate of Poland, to Pope Pius XII, Vatican Broadcasts, and Other Reliable Evidence, New York, Longmans, Green & Co., 1941, pages 27, 107.
- Poland, Ministry of Information, The Black Book of Poland, New York, G.P. Putnam’s Sons, 1942, pages 24–25, 340, 342. Google Books
- Poland, Ministry of Information, The German New Order in Poland, London, Published for the Polish Ministry of Information by Hutchinson & Co., 1942, pages 24, 331–335. Google Books
- United Nations Information Office (London, England), The Axis System of Hostages (Conditions in Occupied Territories series, No. 1), London, His Majesty's Stationery Office, 1942, page xxv. Google Books
- Poland, Ministry of Information, The Nazi Kultur in Poland. By several authors of necessity temporarily anonymous..., London, Published for the Polish Ministry of Information by His Majesty's Stationery Office, 1945, page 9. Google Books
- Jan C. [sic; article described by the newspaper as "from our own correspondent"], "Bestialstwa niemieckie w Bydgoszczy" (The German Atrocities in Bydgoszcz), Dziennik Polski (Kraków), vol. 1, No. 76, 23 April 1945, page 4. (The names of Szarek and Stanisław Wiórek are specifically mentioned; includes further particulars (gruesome) about the execution as a whole and about other victims.)
- Józef Kołodziejczyk, Prawda o "Krwawej Niedzieli Bydgoskiej": faktomontaż, (Materiały do Badań Zbrodni Hitlerowskich na Pomorzu series, No. 1), Bydgoszcz, Polski Związek Zachodni (Koło Śródmieście), 1945, page 43. Google Books (The title translates as "The Truth about the "Bloody Sunday" in Bydgoszcz: A Timeline". The series' title is: "Materials for the Investigation of Nazi Crimes in Pomerania".)
- Kazimierz Borucki, Tablice pamiątkowe Bydgoszczy, Bydgoszcz, Państwowe Wydawnictwo Naukowe (Bydgoskie Towarzystwo Naukowe), 1963, page 45. Google Books
- Janusz Gumkowski & Rajmund Kuczma, Zbrodnie hitlerowskie: Bydgoszcz 1939, Warsaw, Polonia, 1967. Google Books
- Edward Wichura-Zajdel, Z dziejów duchowieństwa śląskiego w czasie wojny 1939–1945, Warsaw, PAX, 1968, page 28. Google Books
- Prace Komisji Historii — Seria C, ed. Z. Grot, Poznań, Państwowe Wydawnictwo Naukowe, 1969, pages 148 & 150. Google Books
- Włodzimierz Jastrzębski, Terror i zbrodnia: eksterminacja ludności polskiej i żydowskiej w rejencji bydgoskiej w latach 1939–1945, Warsaw, Polska Agencja Interpress, 1974, page 41. Google Books (An important primary source for the massacre of 9 September 1939.)
- Wiktor Jacewicz & Jan Woś, Martyrologium polskiego duchowieństwa rzymskokatolickiego pod okupacją hitlerowską w latach 1939–1945, fasc. 3 (Wykaz duchownych zmarłych, zamordowanych lub represjonowanych przez okupanta w archidiecezjach gnieźnieńskiej, krakowskiej i lwowskiej oraz diecezjach katowickiej, kieleckiej, lubelskiej i w obozie koncentrcyjnym w Oświęcimiu), Warsaw, Akademia Teologii Katolickiej, 1978, page 9. Google Books
- "Symbol przetrwania: legenda krwawej ręki" (A Symbol of Endurance: The Legend of a Bloody Handprint); in: Rajmund Kuczma & Jerzy Derenda, Legendy i przypowieści (Biblioteka Bydgoska series), Bydgoszcz, Towarzystwo Miłośników miasta Bydgoszczy, 1992, pages 67–68.
- Janusz Kutta, "Rola Kościoła katolickiego w dziejach Bydgoszczy" (The Role of the Catholic Church in the History of Bydgoszcz), Kronika Bydgoska, vol. 19, ed. W. Jastrzębski, et al., Bydgoszcz, Towarzystwo Miłośników miasta Bydgoszczy, 1998, page 14. ISSN 0454-5451.
- Bogdan Chrzanowski, Andrzej Gąsiorowski, and Krzysztof Steyer, Polska podziemna na Pomorzu w latach 1939–1945, Gdańsk, Polnord — Wydawnictwo Oskar, 2005, page 495. ISBN 838992305X, ISBN 9788389923059. Google Books
- Klaus-Michael Mallmann, Jochen Böhler, Jürgen Matthäus, eds., Einsatzgruppen in Polen: Darstellung und Dokumentation, (Veröffentlichungen der Forschungsstelle Ludwigsburg der Universität Stuttgart series, vol. 12), Darmstadt, Wissenschaftliche Buchgesellschaft (WBG), 2008. ISBN 9783534213535, ISBN 353421353X.
- Krzysztof Błażejewski, "Oto są oprawcy Bydgoszczy: Pierwszy raz pokazujemy twarze Niemców odpowiedzialnych za egzekucje 9 i 10 września 1939 roku", Express Bydgoski (Bydgoszcz), 9 September 2010. ISSN 1230-9192. (Article published in a local daily on the 71st anniversary of the massacre in which Szarek was killed.)
