= Walter Braemer =

Nazi criminal, SS-Gruppenführer

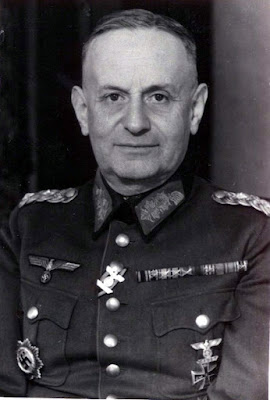
- Born: 7 January 1883; German Empire
- Died: 13 June 1955 (aged 72); West Germany
- Military career
- Allegiance: German Empire; Weimar Republic; Nazi Germany
- Branch: Schutzstaffel
- Rank: SS-Gruppenführer and General der Kavallerie

Walter Braemer (7 January 1883 – 13 June 1955) was a general in the Reichswehr and the Wehrmacht and a high-ranking SS commander during the Nazi era. He was a Nazi criminal responsible for mass murders of the civilian population of Bromberg (Bydgoszcz) in Poland at the outset of the Second World War, and later for crimes against humanity in the Holocaust in the Soviet Union. He escaped prosecution and punishment after the war despite having been held for 2 1/2 years as a prisoner of war by the British.

== Early career ==
Braemer was born at Königsberg, then an East Prussian port city on the Baltic Sea, on 7 January 1883. His military career under the German Empire and the Weimar Republic bears the unmistakable hallmarks of patronage commonly accorded at the time to people of high birth.

On 2 March 1901, at the age of 18, he enlisted as a Fähnrich (officer candidate or ensign) in the 2nd Hanoverian Dragoon Regiment No. 16 (2. Hannoversches Dragoner-Regiment Nr. 16), a unit of the 20th Division of the Prussian Army stationed in the northern garrison town of Lüneburg in the Prussian Province of Hanover. Less than eleven months later, on 27 January 1902, he was promoted, without much education, military or otherwise, to the commissioned rank of Leutnant — his commission as an officer (the so-called Offizierspatent) having been issued on 22 June 1900, that is, actually prior to his enlistment in the army, at a time when he was a civilian minor of 17 years of age.

Only subsequently, for two years between 1906 and 1908, did he study at the Military School of Equitation (Militärreitschule — see Militärreitinstitut) in Hanover. This course was followed by 2 years 9 months and 3 weeks he spent at a military academy (sources speak of a Kriegsakademie: unclear whether the Prussian War Academy is meant, three other options being possible) where he was enrolled until 21 July 1911.

In April 1912, was detached to the central military command known as the "Great General Staff", the governing body of the army. While there, he was given the higher rank of Rittmeister ("captain of the cavalry") on 17 February 1914, and five days later formally inducted into the Great General Staff at the age of 31.

When the First World War broke out, Braemer was transferred on 2 August 1914 to the headquarters of the 9th Cavalry Division, a formation newly raised specifically for the war effort, where he served as a third-in-command (Zweiter Generalstabsoffizier or so-called "Ib") under the fellow-Prussian commander Eberhard Graf von Schmettow and the latter's right hand or "Ia" (Erster Generalstabsoffizier or second-in-command), Major Herwarth von Bittenfeld.

Braemer married Erika Freiin von der Goltz on 27 December 1915; they had three children (b. 1916, 1921, and 1923). Between 9 September 1916 and 18 April 1917 he circulated between the General Staffs (divisional commands) of such formations as the 75th Reserve Division, and the 6th and 7th Cavalry Divisions, before being appointed to the General Staff of the XII (1st Royal Saxon) Corps at Dresden. On 17 January 1917 he was decorated with the Royal Prussian Hohenzollern House Order (Knight's Cross with Swords) for military exploits that remain a complete mystery. He then served for a few months between November 1917 and March 1918 under the Oberquartiermeister (quartermaster-general) within the command known as the 10th Army in Cologne, before being posted very briefly on 28 March 1918 to the General Staff of the 234th Infantry Division (234. Division (Deutsches Kaiserreich)), and the next month again to that of the XXVI Reserve Corps.

After the War he served in the 20th Reichswehr Brigade based at Allenstein (now Olsztyn) in Ermland, 126 km south of his native Königsberg in East Prussia (1 May 1919–13 December 1919), before being delegated to a desk job at the Bendlerblock in Berlin — the Ministry of the Reichswehr — for a period of 2 years and 3 1/2 months between 13 December 1919 and 1 April 1922. While there he was again promoted to the rank of Major (roughly equivalent to major in Anglo-American taxonomies) on 1 January 1922. For 18 months between April 1922 to October 1923 he was squadron leader (Eskadronchef) in the 2nd (Prussian) Cavalry Regiment (2. (Preußisches) Reiter-Regiment (Reichswehr)) that garrisoned both Allenstein and Osterode (now Ostróda) in Ermland, then within the Province of East Prussia. Next, over the period of 3 years and 4 months from October 1923 to February 1927, Braemer served on the General Staff of the 6th Division at Münster in Westphalia: here he saw another advancement in rank to Oberstleutnant (lieutenant colonel) on 1 April 1926. From 1 February 1927 to 1 January 1931 he held the command of the 6th (Prussian) Cavalry Regiment (6. (Preußisches) Reiter-Regiment) headquartered in the northern town of Pasewalk, about 40 km west of Stettin (now Szczecin) in Western Pomerania — a post in which he spent 3 years and 11 months (his longest tour of duty ever). A promotion to the rank of Oberst (or colonel) was accorded him there on 1 October 1929. Lastly, Braemer held the military command of the city of Insterburg in East Prussia (now Chernyakhovsk in Russia), some 100 km east of his native Königsberg, during the nearly 22-month period from 1 January 1931 to 30 November 1932. He was promoted to Generalmajor (a rank corresponding to that of brigadier general) on 1 October 1932, and two months later retired from the Reichswehr at the age of 49.

== Nazi period ==
=== The beginning ===
Two years and eight months after Hitler's rise to power and nearly three years after his leave-taking of the army, on 1 October 1935, Braemer — then aged 52 — joined the SS with the rank of Standartenführer (regiment leader), and in this rank was posted as a "training consultant" to the General Staff of the SS circuit or Oberabschnitt known as command Nord (not an army post), where he stayed until 15 April 1936, to be transferred to the Oberabschnitt Nordwest for one month, before being moved again to the Oberabschnitt Nordsee, where he stayed until 1 July 1938. All three SS districts in question were at the time headquartered at Altona in Hamburg. In the course of his SS service Braemer gained two promotions, ultimately to Brigadeführer, the fourth-highest rank in the SS, a remarkably quick climb accomplished in less than 2 years and 9 months since joining the ranks. The latter rank of Brigadeführer was conferred on him only after he had become member of the Nazi party sometime in 1937 (the exact date of his joining the NSDAP has not been established) with the membership number 4012329. At this time Braemer involved himself with Himmler's Lebensborn Society, an organization whose purpose was to devise ways and means of engineering the genetic makeup of the German nation by promoting Nazi eugenics and "breeding" pure "Aryans". On 1 July 1938 Braemer was appointed to the rank of Generalmajor of the Wehrmacht, the same rank he last held in the Reichswehr, and was placed by the SS once again at the disposal of the army. At the time of mobilization mounted in preparation for the Nazi attack on Poland Braemer was appointed as the Commander of the 580th Army Rear Area, a position abbreviated to "Korück 580". He received that command on 26 August 1939, six days before the invasion of Poland. Four days after becoming Korück 580, on 30 August 1939, Braemer gave the order for the formation of the concentration camp at Liepe, 8 kilometres west of the current German-Polish border, which camp was established on 1 September 1939, the first day of the Second World War. As Korück 580 Braemer was also responsible for the creation of the camps located at Łopienek (Ruhental) and other localities.

=== Criminal activities ===
==== Poland ====
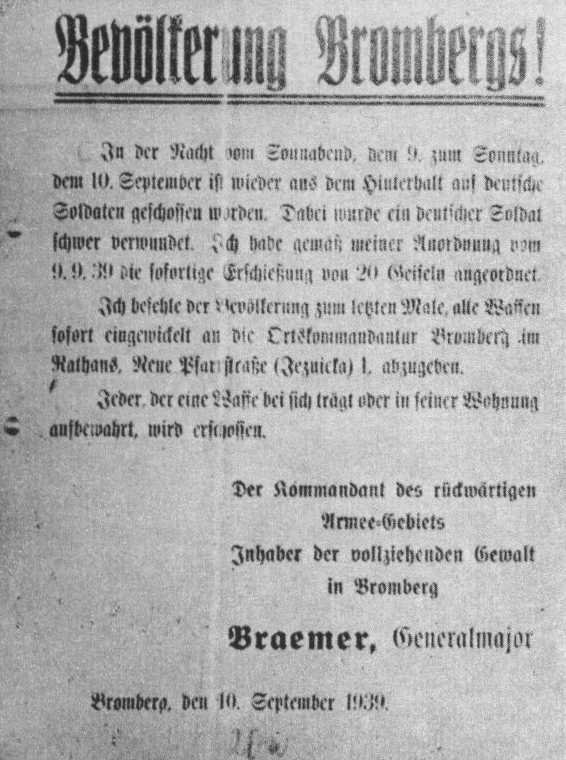
Announcement signed by Braemer informing about the public execution of 20 of Polish hostages at Old Market in Bydgoszcz on 9 September 1939

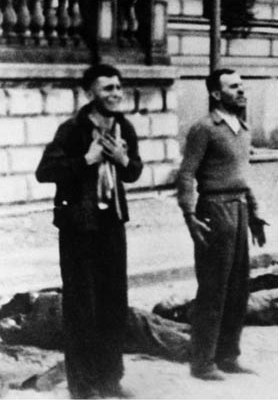
Public execution in Bydgoszcz's Old Market Square of civilians randomly caught in a street roundup (łapanka in Polish) on 9 September 1939 (historical photo from Jastrzębski 1974).

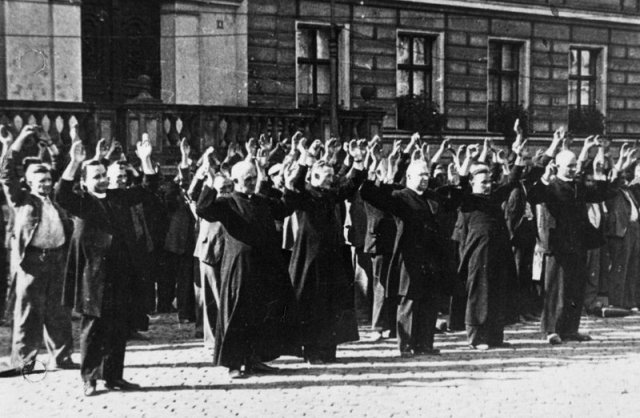
Public execution in Bydgoszcz's Old Market Square of civilians randomly caught in a street roundup on 9 September 1939, which was part of Bloody Sunday (historical photo from Jastrzębski & Sziling 1979).

Shortly after the strike on Poland Braemer found himself with the Nazi invasion force in the Polish region of Cuyavia, where according to latest scholarship he was appointed by the 4th German Army — in his capacity as Korück 580 — the commandant of the northern Polish city of Bydgoszcz, a position in which he formally styled himself in his written proclamations as the "chief in executive authority" (Inhaber der vollziehenden Gewalt in Bromberg). His short stint as the supremo of Bydgoszcz lasted with effect from 5 September 1939 — some earlier published sources cite the date of 8 September 1939 for his assumption of this post. The dates are significant, as his appearance on the Bydgoszcz stage is said in some sources to have lasted for a total of only six days (although the far limit of his "tour of duty" is in fact uncertain). Within just four days of Braemer's beginning to exercise his "executive authority" he became personally responsible for the murder of 370 Polish civilians in Bydgoszcz in the large-scale pacification operations he ordered (the so-called säuberungsaktionen or "cleanup operations"). These included the public execution by a firing squad in the city's historic Old Market Square on 9 September 1939 of a large group of civilians randomly rounded up in the streets a short while earlier in the day (see the historical photographs to the right), a crime which provoked in the ensuing months a protest from the Vatican (as the victims included Catholic priests: see Piotr Szarek). By 8 September 1939 the total number of civilian victims of Bydgoszcz executions grew to 200–400 by various estimates; on 9 September 1939 another 120 were shot. The next day, 10 September 1939, in a Braemer-ordered raid on the working-class Bydgoszcz neighbourhood of "Swedish Heights" (Szwederowo) between 120 and 200 civilians were killed, while another public execution staged on that day in the centrally located Old Market Square claimed 20 victims. It is said that the mass murders of civilians in Bydgoszcz went on at such a pace that Braemer, although a "competent commandant", eventually lost all count of how many had been killed — and he allowed the slaughter to continue. Apparently the level of atrocities was such that on occasion it produced qualms of conscience in his own executioners, but never in Braemer himself (as evidenced by his entries in the personal diary he kept). While carrying out his actions against the townsfolk of Bydgoszcz, in reprisal for the stiff resistance that the civilian population put up against the German invaders after the Polish armed forces withdrew from the city on 4 September 1939, Braemer instituted at the same time ethnic cleansing policies against the Jewish minority of the town (which numbered about 2,000 before the War), being able as a result to report on 14 November 1939, in the 11th week of the war, that "the Jewish question does not arise in Bydgoszcz... because during the säuberungsaktionen all the Jews who did not deem it advisable to flee from the city beforehand were eliminated". The Bydgoszcz massacres are the primary reason for which some German historians have considered Braemer an "extremist" among the Nazi Wehrmacht's corps of generals. Others have described him as a "fanatical Nazi" who resorted to (by then, i.e. in September 1939) "unheard-of brutality". Little is known of Braemer's activities immediately following his disappearance from the Bydgoszcz scene, a community on which he left an indelible mark, and there is no clear record of his departure as such. Historians (such as Stanisław Nawrocki) have merely noted that he did not play any role in the occupation of the historical region of Greater Poland (Wielkopolska), i.e. of the lands to the west of Cuyavia where Bydgoszcz is located, thereby suggesting that his activities were of interest to researchers in other areas. It is on record, however, that Braemer continued as Korück 580 (a position which put him in charge of "law and order" in areas under Nazi occupation) for a total of nearly 21 months — until 19 May 1941.

After his appointment as Korück 580 came to an end on 19 May 1941, Braemer spent 35 days, until 24 June 1941, officially mothballed in the führerreserve or officers' reserve pool within the German Army High Command (Oberkommando des Heeres) as his new assignment was being prepared for him.

==== The Baltic and Byelorussia ====
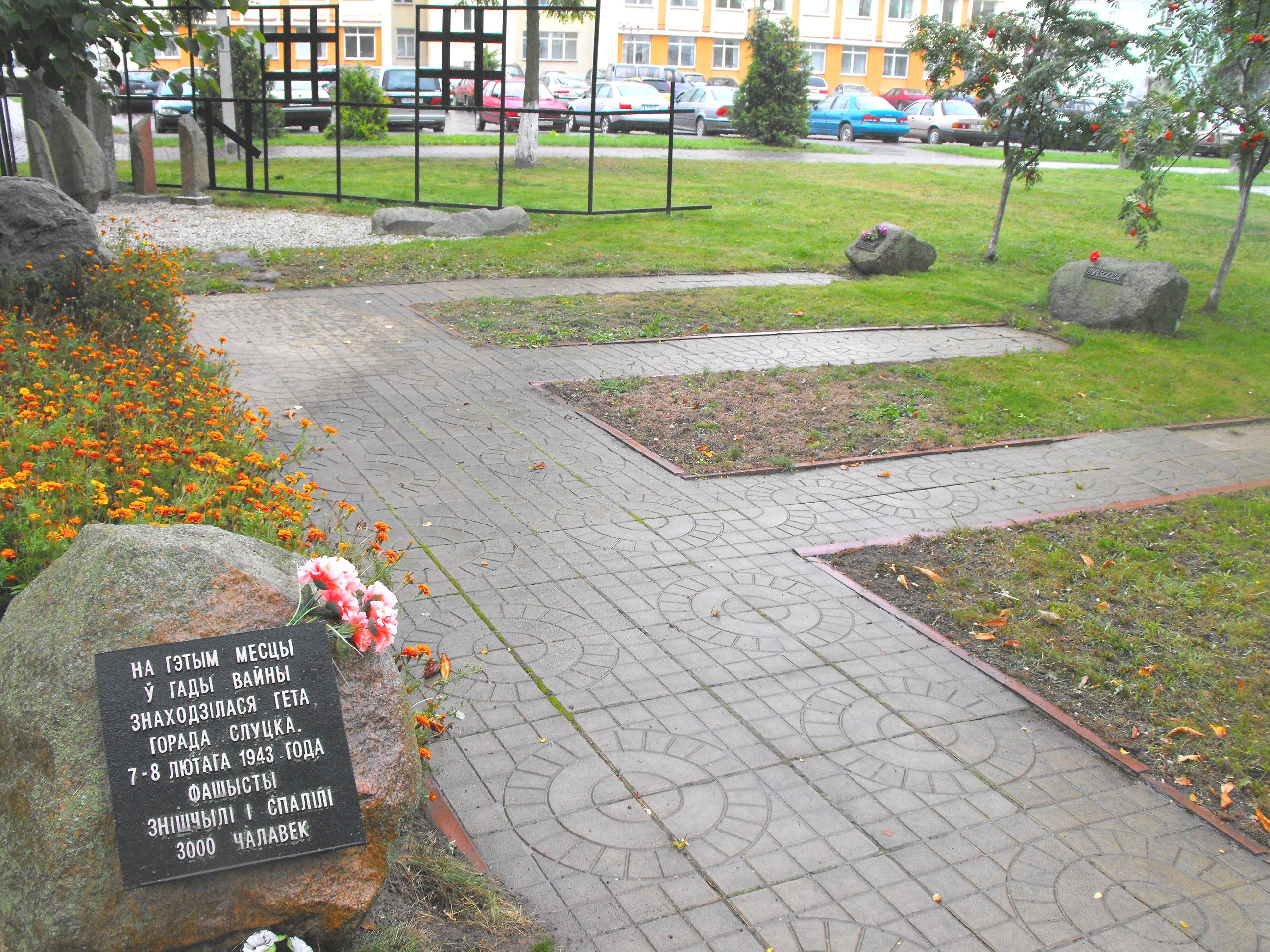
Memorial stone on the site of the Slutsk ghetto — the inscription reads, in part: ON THIS SPOT, ON 7 AND 8 FEBRUARY 1943, THE NAZIS KILLED AND BURNED 3,000 PEOPLE (photo September 2012)

Two days after the commencement of the Operation Barbarossa (the German attack on the Soviet Union), Braemer was appointed the Wehrmachtbefehlshaber or supreme military commander of the so-called Reichskommissariat Ostland, a Nazi régime established in the combined occupied territory of the Baltic states, parts of northeastern Poland and western Byelorussia, headquartered in Riga, the capital of Latvia (again in the general region of his birth, 380 km to the north-east of his native Königsberg). He was to hold this office during the period of about 2 years and 10 months between 24 June 1941 and 20 April 1944. In some reports his appointment to this post was already finalized in the planning stages on 27 May 1941. In this capacity Braemer was heavily implicated in the mass murder of the Jewish population in the territories under his command. He was responsible for, among other things, promulgating legislation that laid the legal and operational groundwork on the basis of which whole Jewish communities numbering thousands of people were exterminated in the Holocaust. Thus for example, on 25 September 1941 Braemer issued his "Guidelines for Military Security and Maintenance of Quiet and Order" which specifically stipulated the "imperative elimination" of, among others, "Jews and philosemitic elements (judenfreundliche Kreise)". The pivotal role that Braemer played in the Holocaust of the Jewish populations in Byelorussia has been described by the German historian Hannes Heer. Braemer has been shown to possess the notorious distinction of having originated the first annihilation operations against the Jewish ghettos in ByeloRussia: the Smilavichy ghetto, whose 1,338 inhabitants were murdered on 14 October 1941; the Koidanovo ghetto, with its 1,000 victims on 21 October 1941; followed by the murder of 5,900 people in the predominantly Jewish town of Slutsk on 27 and 28 October 1941 in a massacre sometimes euphemistically referred to as the "Slutsk Affair" — and that just to begin with. Braemer's service in the Ostland was considered so meritorious by both the Wehrmacht and the SS that he was rewarded with two military promotions, viz., to Generalleutnant (a rank roughly corresponding to major-general) on 1 July 1941, just a week after arrival, and later, 14 months into his tour of duty, on 1 September 1942, as a reward for a job well done, to General der Kavallerie z.v. ("general of the cavalry", the second-highest general officer rank roughly equivalent to lieutenant general, a "prestigious" cachet within the echelons of the German military); and then again on the last day of his assignment with an SS promotion to the rank of Gruppenführer, the third-highest SS rank overall. Goebbels went so far as to discuss Braemer's "political ideas" in his diaries (entry for 24 November 1941).

=== Conflict with Lohse ===
Nazi approval of Braemer was not universal, however. During his tenure as the Wehrmachtbefehlshaber or territorial military commander of the Reichskommissariat Ostland, Braemer had (presumably) an immediate superior in the person of Reichskommissar (and Gauleiter) Hinrich Lohse, the overall governor of the Ostland who was likewise headquartered in Riga, Latvia. While Lohse's slapping of Braemer on the face — in public — at the Riga Opera House during the banquet celebrating Hitler's birthday on 20 April 1944 probably should not be made too much of, it is indicative nonetheless of the tensions simmering within the Nazi leadership in the Ostland and points at least to the possibility that even to high-ranking (but non-Wehrmacht and non-SS) Nazis like Lohse the methods used by Braemer in the implementation of the Holocaust might have seemed objectionable (if only on economic grounds, by depriving his administration of needed workforce), even if the event has also been put down to the incipient panic in the face of looming defeat or to personal rivalries between two Nazi apparatchiks vying for a position of pre-eminence within the Ostland bureaucracy. In some reports the punch from Lohse (meted out in response to Braemer's applying to Lohse the unparliamentary epithet of dummes Luder — "silly rotter") is said literally to have knocked Braemer to the ground. But the knockout blow appears to have been invested with figurative significance as well, as the incident marks Braemer's exit from the scene in Riga (on orders from the Wehrmacht which removed him that very day not only from the commandership of the Ostland but from active duty altogether) and, conversely, his promotion by the SS to the aforementioned higher rank of gruppenführer on the same day. Braemer was 61-years' old at the time.

=== The end game ===
After his retirement on 20 April 1944 from the position of Wehrmachtbefehlshaber in the Ostland — an office to which Braemer was first appointed on 24 June 1941 but which from 30 January 1942 onwards he had been holding concurrently with his (second) SS posting on the command of Oberabschnitt Nordsee, an SS beat headquartered at Altona near Hamburg — he continued on active duty in the latter (non-army) post for 6 months and 3 weeks longer, until 9 November 1944, even while being rusticated by the army to the Führerreserve or officers' reserve pool within the German Army High Command (Oberkommando des Heeres) with effect from 20 April 1944.

After nearly nine months in reserve, on 17 January 1945 Braemer was suddenly recalled by the Wehrmacht to active duty as a so-called "general on special assignment" (General zur besonderen Verwendung) and in that capacity posted to the Military District Command I at Königsberg, his native place (Wehrkreis I (Königsberg); 17–22 January 1945), only to shift after just five days — doubtless in connection with the tightening vice grip by the Soviet forces investing the city — to the Military District Command II at Stettin in Western Pomerania (Wehrkreis II (Stettin)), some 480 kilometres (overland) away from Königsberg and its Eastern front, where he spent the following 19 days in a similar capacity (as a "general on special assignment") between 22 January and 10 February 1945. Finally, during the ensuing 22 days between 10 February and 4 March 1945 Braemer exercised (ersatz) "military authority" as a Korück (for definition, see above) or rear-army-area commander for the Wehrmacht's 11th Army — a largely fictitious formation contrived on paper by Himmler for the sake of providing employment to the rapidly increasing cadre of unemployed SS functionaries (see 11th SS Panzer Army) — before being relegated once more and for the last time to the Führerreserve of the German Army High Command on 4 March 1945, two months before the end of the War.

== Aftermath ==
Braemer surrendered to the British Second Army in the port city of Lübeck in Germany on 2 May 1945 and detained as a prisoner of war. Eight months later, on 9 January 1946 he was transferred to the prisoner-of-war camp in South Wales, the so-called Special Camp 11 (Island Farm), where high-value Nazi captives awaiting extradition to Nuremberg were imprisoned. Braemer was interned at Island Farm for 21 months as prisoner No. A451665. On 6 October 1947, Braemer was transferred from Island Farm — via Camp 43 — to the Civil Internment Camp No. 6 at Neuengamme near Hamburg, a post-Nazi concentration-camp facility used after the War specifically for detention of suspected German war criminals. There he was apparently set free sometime later that October without extenuating circumstances (like ill health: the precise circumstances and date of release are not known), having spent less than 2 1/2 years in prisoner-of-war camps but without having been brought to trial for war crimes. This outcome was apparently brought about by the deliberate shielding of Braemer by British authorities wilfully refusing to take cognizance of his past as a war criminal.

On 30 August 1948, ten months after his release from British custody, the government of Poland requested the extradition of Braemer on the charge of murder of twenty hostages and hundreds of civilians in Poland in 1939. By the admission of British Foreign Office personnel, the facts of the case were never in dispute, "not even by Braemer himself". Nevertheless, after legal manoeuvrings and much prevarication intended to shield Braemer from responsibility for his crimes, the extradition request was refused in September 1950 by the Government of the United Kingdom. According to some sources, the Polish request for Braemer's extradition was initially presented to (and denied by) the British authorities as early as 1945. In a ruling by the British Extradition Court in Hamburg that has only recently — half a century after the fact — been called into question by some British historians such as Donald Bloxham, Braemer was in effect declared innocent of war crimes on the grounds that the execution ordered by him of the hostages in question "had been so ordered in accordance with the law of nations".

Although Telford Taylor, the legendary American prosecutor at the Nuremberg Trials, takes note of Braemer in several of his books (for example, in The March of Conquest, 1958; see Bibliography), there is no record of Braemer's having ever been called to answer for his role in the Holocaust on the territory of the (former) Soviet Union.

Braemer died of natural causes in Hamburg on 13 June 1955, at the age of 72, a free man who has never been convicted of or charged in open court with any crime.

Braemer's personal papers and personnel files ("Personalakte Walter Braemer"; including pages from his war diary which provide direct evidence of some of his crimes) are preserved at the German Federal Archives-Military Archives (BA-MA; see Bundesarchiv-Militärarchiv) located at Wiesentalstraße 10 in the city of Freiburg im Breisgau (shelf mark Pers. 6/2102), and at the Bundesarchiv Berlin (BAB).

== Awards and decorations ==
- Iron Cross of 1914, 1st and 2nd class [8]
- Knight's Cross of the Royal House Order of Hohenzollern with Swords [8]
- Military Merit Order, 4th class with Swords (Bavaria) [8]
- Knight's Cross Second Class of the Friedrich Order with Swords [8]
- Knight's Cross, First Class of the Order of the Zähringer Lion with Swords [8]
- Friedrich August Cross, 1st class [8]
- Order of the Iron Crown, 3rd class with war decoration (Austria) [8]
- Military Merit Cross with war decoration (Austria-Hungary) [8]
- Iron Cross of 1939, 1st and 2nd class
- Sword of honour of the Reichsführer-SS
- SS Honour Ring

== See also ==
- Register of SS leaders in general's rank
- Niemieckie represje wobec ludności Bydgoszczy (1939) ("German repressions against the population of Bydgoszcz in 1939" — on Polish Wikipedia)
- Pacification operations in German-occupied Poland
- Operation Tannenberg
- Intelligenzaktion Pommern
- Valley of Death (Bydgoszcz)
- World War II crimes in Poland
- Bloody Sunday (1939)
- Piotr Szarek
- Stanisław Wiórek
- Hinrich Lohse (on German Wikipedia)
- Reichskommissariat Ostland
- The Holocaust in Belarus
- Slutsk Affair
- Glossary of Nazi Germany

== Bibliography ==
=== Career history ===
- The Lexikon der Wehrmacht (See online.) (Braemer's military-career timeline in the present article, including dates of appointments and promotions (but excluding military decorations, which have been for the most part omitted altogether as substantively irrelevant), is based primarily on this source, with the sources listed below serving a supplementary role.)
- Prisoner information on inmate No. A451665 from the British prisoner-of-war camp — Island Farm — where Braemer was held between 9 January 1946 and 6 October 1947 (See online.) (In addition to a detailed career timeline, includes dates and places of detention as a POW, and a prison mugshot of Braemer.)
- Reichswehrministerium (Heeres-Personalamt) [institutional author], Rangliste des deutschen Reichsheeres: Nach dem Stande vom 1. Mai 1927, Berlin, Verlag von E. S. Mittler & Sohn, 1927, page 56. Google Books
- SS-Personalhauptamt [institutional author], Dienstaltersliste der Schutzstaffel der NSDAP... Stand vom 1. Dezember 1938..., ed. B. Meyer, Berlin, [Gedruckt in der Reichsdruckerei], 1938, page 14. Google Books
- SS-Personalhauptamt [institutional author], Dienstaltersliste der Schutzstaffel der NSDAP... Stand vom 20. April 1942..., Berlin, [Gedruckt in der Reichsdruckerei], 1942, page 142. Google Books
- Wolf Keilig, Das deutsche Heer, 1939–1945, vol. 3 (Gliederung; Einsatz, Stellenbesetzung), Bad Nauheim, Verlag Hans-Henning Podzun, 1956, page 43. Google Books
- Telford Taylor, The March of Conquest: The German Victories in Western Europe, 1940, New York, Simon & Schuster, 1958, page 411. Google Books
- German Order of Battle, 1944: The Regiments, Formations and Units of the German Ground Forces, London, Arms & Armour Press, 1975, pages B-40 & K-9. ISBN 0882543555.
- Alexander Dallin, German Rule in Russia, 1941–1945: A Study of Occupation Policies, 2nd ed., rev., Boulder (Colorado), Westview Press, 1981, page 196. ISBN 0865311021. (1st ed., 1957. For Braemer's spat with Hinrich Lohse. Dallin refers to Braemer as "Friedrich Braemer", with doubtful accuracy, a practice which is repeated in the works of others. However, Walter Braemer is also called "Friedrich Braemer" in: NS-Gewaltherrschaft: Beiträge zur historischen Forschung und juristischen Aufarbeitung, ed. A. Gottwaldt, (Haus der Wannsee-Konferenz: Publikationen der Gedenk- und Bildungsstätte Haus der Wannsee-Konferenz series, vol. 11), Berlin, Edition Hentrich, 2005, p. 226. ISBN 3894682787.)
- Otto Bräutigam, "Aus dem Kriegstagebuch des Diplomaten Otto Bräutigam", ed. H. D. Heilmann; in: Götz Aly, Biedermann und Schreibtischtäter: Materialien zur deutschen Täter-Biographie, (Beiträge zur nationalsozialistischen Gesundheits- und Sozialpolitik series, vol. 4), Berlin, Rotbuch-Verlag, 1987, page 148. ISBN 3880229538, ISBN 9783880229532. (For Braemer's spat with Hinrich Lohse.)
- Hans-Heinrich Wilhelm, "Motivation und 'Kriegsbild' deutscher Generale und Offiziere im Krieg gegen die Sowjetunion"; in: Erobern und Vernichten: der Krieg gegen die Sowjetunion 1941–1945, ed. P Jahn, et al., Berlin, Argon Verlag, 1991, pages 173 & 181. ISBN 3870241896. Google Books
- Stellenbesetzung der deutschen Heere, 1815–1939, vol. 3 (Die Stellenbesetzung der aktiven Regimenter, Bataillone und Abteilungen von der Stiftung bzw. Aufstellung bis zum 26. August 1939...), Osnabrück, Biblio-Verlag, 1993, page 477. ISBN 3764824131. Google Books
- "Führer-Erlasse" 1939–1945: Edition sämtlicher überlieferter, nicht im Reichsgesetzblatt abgedruckter, von Hitler während des Zweiten Weltkrieges schriftlich erteilter Direktiven aus den Bereichen Staat, Partei, Wirtschaft, Besatzungspolitik und Militärverwaltung, ed. M. Moll, et al., Stuttgart, Franz Steiner Verlag, 1997, pages 191–192, 196–197, 204–205 & 314–315. ISBN 3515068732. (Supplementary information for the dates of Braemer's appointments in the Ostland.)
- Werner Haupt, Army Group North: The Wehrmacht in Russia, 1941–1945, tr. J. G. Welsh, Atglen (Pennsylvania), Schiffer Publishing, 1997, pages 188, 306, 386. ISBN 0764301829. (Originally published as Heeresgruppe Nord, 1941–1945, Bad Nauheim, Verlag Hans-Henning Podzun, 1966.)
- Die geheimen Tagesberichte der Deutschen Wehrmachtführung im Zweiten Weltkrieg: 1939–1945, ed. K. Mehner, vol. 8 (1. September 1943–30. November 1943), Osnabrück, Biblio-Verlag, 1998, page 554. ISBN 3764817356.
- Umbreit, Hans (2003). "German Rule in the Occupied Territories, 1942-1945". In Kroener, Bernhard R.; Müller, Rolf-Dieter; Umbreit, Hans (eds.). Germany and the Second World War. Vol. 5/2 (Organization and Mobilization of the German Sphere of Power: Wartime Administration, Economy, and Manpower Resources, 1942-1944/45). Tr. D. Cook-Radmore. Oxford University Press. ISBN 0198208731. (For Braemer's spat with Hinrich Lohse).

=== Braemer's war crimes ===
- Die Verfolgung und Ermordung der europäischen Juden durch das nationalsozialistische Deutschland, 1933–1945, vol. 7 (Sowjetunion mit annektierten Gebieten; pt. 1, Besetzte sowjetische Gebiete unter deutscher Militärverwaltung, Baltikum und Transnistrien), ed. B. Hoppe, Munich, Oldenbourg Wissenschaftsverlag, 2011, pages 552, 567–570, 583, 668 n. 13. ISBN 9783486589115.
- "Recenzje i omówienia", Wojskowy Przegląd Historyczny (Warsaw), vol. 7, No. 3, July–September 1962, pages 376–377, note 78. Google Books
- Angrick, Andrej; Klein, Peter (2009). The "Final Solution" in Riga: Exploitation and Annihilation, 1941-1944. tr. R. Brandon. New York City: Berghahn Books. ISBN 978-184545608-5. (First published as Die "Endlösung" in Riga: Ausbeutung und Vernichtung, 1941-1944. Darmstadt: Wissenschaftliche Buchgesellschaft. 2006. ISBN 978-353419149-9).
- B. Asmuss ed.,Deutsche und Polen, 1.9.39: Abgründe und Hoffnungen, et al., Dresden, Sandstein, 2009. ISBN 9783940319661.
- Franciszek Bernaś and Julitta Mikulska-Bernaś, Najazd, Warsaw, Ludowa Spółdzielnia Wydawnicza, 1964. Google Books (The title translates as "The Invasion".)
- Franciszek Bernaś and Julitta Mikulska-Bernaś, Bydgoski wrzesień, Warsaw, Książka i Wiedza (Rada Ochrony Pomników Walki i Męczeństwa), 1968. Google Books ((in English) "The Bydgoszcz September".)
- Zygmunt Bielecki and Ryszard Dębowski, In Defence of Independence — Poland, September 1939, tr. S. Tarnowski, Warsaw, Interpress Publishers (Council for the Protection of Struggle and Martyrdom Sites), 1972, page 123. Google Books
- Marian Biskup, ed., Historia Bydgoszczy, vol. 2, pt. 2 (1939–1945), Bydgoszcz, Bydgoskie Towarzystwo Naukowe, 2004. ISBN 8392145402.
- Krzysztof Błażejewski, "Oto są oprawcy Bydgoszczy: Pierwszy raz pokazujemy twarze Niemców odpowiedzialnych za egzekucje 9 i 10 września 1939 roku", Express Bydgoski, 9 September 2010. (Article published in a local daily on the 71st anniversary of two of the Bydgoszcz massacres mentioned above.)
- Donald Bloxham, Genocide on Trial: War Crimes Trials and the Formation of Holocaust History and Memory, Oxford, Oxford University Press, 2001, pages 199–201. ISBN 0198208723. Google Books
- Jochen Böhler, "'Tragische Verstrickung' oder Auftakt zum Vernichtungskrieg? Die Wehrmacht in Polen, 1939"; in: Genesis des Genozids: Polen, 1939–1941, ed. K.-M. Mallmann & B. Musial, (Forschungsstelle Ludwigsburg: Veröffentlichungen der Forschungsstelle Ludwigsburg der Universität Stuttgart series, vol. 3), Darmstadt, WBG: Wissenschaftliche Buchgesellschaft (Auftr. des Deutschen Historischen Instituts Warschau), 2004, pages 36–56. ISBN 3534180968, ISBN 9783534180967.
- Jochen Böhler, Auftakt zum Vernichtungskrieg: Die Wehrmacht in Polen, 1939, Frankfurt am Main, Fischer-Taschenbuch-Verlag, 2006, pages 206–208. ISBN 3596163072, ISBN 9783596163076.
- Jochen Böhler, Der Überfall: Deutschlands Krieg gegen Polen, Frankfurt am Main, Eichborn, 2009. ISBN 9783821857060.
- Christopher R. Browning (with contributions by Jürgen Matthäus), The Origins of the Final Solution: The Evolution of Nazi Jewish Policy, September 1939–March 1942, Lincoln (Nebraska), University of Nebraska Press; Jerusalem, Yad Vashem, 2004, pages 29, 288–290, 303–306, 333. ISBN 0803259794, ISBN 9780803259799.
- Martin Cüppers, Wegbereiter der Shoah: Die Waffen-SS, der Kommandostab Reichsführer-SS und die Judenvernichtung, 1939–1945, Darmstadt, WBG: Wissenschaftliche Buchgesellschaft, 2005, page 405. ISBN 3534160223.
- Wolfgang Curilla, Der Judenmord in Polen und die deutsche Ordnungspolizei, 1939–1945, Paderborn, Verlag Ferdinand Schöningh, 2011. ISBN 3506770438, ISBN 9783506770431.
- Esman, T.; Jastrzębski, W., eds. (1967). Pierwsze miesiące okupacji hitlerowskiej w Bydgoszczy w świetle źródełniemieckich [The First Months of the Nazi Occupation of Bydgoszcz as reflected in German Sources]. includes transcripts of original documents in German relating to Braemer's actions in Bydgoszcz. Bydgoskie Towarzystwo Naukowe / Państwowe Wydawnictwo Naukowe. pp. ix–xii, 7–13, 102, 123–9, 139, 151–5, 222, 237, 240–9.
- Jürgen Förster, "The Relation between Operation Barbarossa as an Ideological War of Extermination and the Final Solution"; in: The Final Solution: Origins and Implementation, ed. D. Cesarani, London, Routledge, 1994. ISBN 0415099544.
- Jürgen Förster, "Wehrmacht, Krieg und Holocaust"; in: Die Wehrmacht: Mythos und Realität, ed. R.-D. Müller & H.-E. Volkmann, Munich, R. Oldenbourg Verlag, 1999, page 959. ISBN 3486563831.
- Hans Frank, Okupacja i ruch oporu w Dzienniku Hansa Franka 1939–1945, vol. 1 (1939–1942), ed. S. Płoski, et al., tr. D. Dąbrowska, et al., Warsaw, Książka i Wiedza, 1970, pages 102–103. Google Books ((in English) "The [Nazi] Occupation and the Resistance Movement as reflected in the Diary of Hans Frank".)
- Ryszard Frelek and Włodzimierz T. Kowalski, Polska: czas burzy i przełomu, 1939–1945, vol. 1, Warsaw, Wydawnictwa Radia i Telewizji, 1980, page 343. ISBN 8321201164. Google Books ((in English) "Poland in Time of Storm and Transition, 1939–1945".)
- Saul S. Friedman, A History of the Holocaust, London, Vallentine Mitchell, 2004, page 183. ISBN 0853034354; ISBN 0853034273.
- Christian Gerlach, Kalkulierte Morde: Die deutsche Wirtschafts- und Vernichtungspolitik in Weißrußland 1941 bis 1944, Hamburg, Hamburger Edition: Hamburger Institut für Sozialforschung (HIS), 1999, pages 173–174, 183, 611–614, 619–620, 733, 752, 1000, 1014. ISBN 3930908549.
- Janusz Gumkowski and Rajmund Kuczma, Zbrodnie hitlerowskie: Bydgoszcz, 1939, Warsaw, Polonia, 1967. Google Books ((in English) "The Nazi Crimes: Bydgoszcz, 1939".)
- Hartmann, Christian (2010). Wehrmacht im Ostkrieg: Front und militärisches Hinterland, 1941/42. Quellen und Darstellungen zur Zeitgeschichte series. Vol. 75 (2nd ed.). Munich: Oldenbourg Wissenschaftsverlag. ISBN 978-348670225-5.
- Hannes Heer, "Nicht Planer, aber Vollstrecker: Die Mitwirkung der Wehrmacht beim Holocaust"; in: Genozid in der modernen Geschichte, ed. S. Förster, et al., Münster, Lit, 1999, passim. ISBN 3825840182.
- Hannes Heer, Tote Zonen: Die deutsche Wehrmacht an der Ostfront, Hamburg, Hamburger Edition: Hamburger Institut für Sozialforschung (HIS), 1999. ISBN 3930908514.
- Hannes Heer, "Killing Fields: The Wehrmacht and the Holocaust in Belorussia, 1941-42", tr. C. Scherer; in: War of Extermination: the German Military in World War II, 1941-1944, ed. H. Heer & K. Naumann, New York, Berghahn Books, 2000, pp. 55–79. ISBN 1571812326, ISBN 1571814930. (First published as "Killing Fields: Die Wehrmacht und der Holocaust"; in: Vernichtungskrieg: Verbrechen der Wehrmacht 1941 bis 1944, ed. H. Heer & K. Naumann, Hamburg, Hamburger Edition: Hamburger Institut für Sozialforschung (HIS), 1995. ISBN 3930908042.)
- Hannes Heer, "Killing Fields: The Wehrmacht and the Holocaust in Belorussia, 1941–1942"; in: Holocaust: Critical Concepts in Historical Studies, ed. D. Cesarani, vol. 3 (The "Final Solution"), London, Routledge, 2004, pages 183–205. ISBN 0415275121. Google Books
- Raul Hilberg, Perpetrators, Victims, Bystanders: The Jewish Catastrophe, 1933–1945, New York, Aaron Asher Books, 1992, page 62. ISBN 0060190353.
- Jastrzębski, Włodzimierz (1974). Terror i zbrodnia: eksterminacja ludności polskiej i żydowskiej w rejencji bydgoskiej w latach 1939-1945 [The Terror and the Crime: The Extermination of the Polish and Jewish Populations in the Bromberg administrative district during the years 1939-1945]. Warsaw: Polska Agencja Interpress. Google Books.
- Jastrzębski, Włodzimierz (1977). Polityka narodowściowa w okręgu Rzeszy Gdańsk-Prusy Zachodnie (1939-1945) [Ethnic Policies in the Third Reich's Region of Danzig-West Prussia, 1939-1945]. Bydgoszcz: Wyższa Szkoła Pedagogiczna. Google Books.
- Jastrzębski, Włodzimierz; Sziling, Jan (1979). Okupacja hitlerowska na Pomorzu Gdańskim w latach 1939-1945 [The Nazi Occupation of Pomerelia, 1939-1945]. Gdańsk: Wydawnictwo Morskie. pp. 78, 88. ISBN 8321571840. Google Books.
- Tadeusz Jaszowski, Hitlerowskie prawo karne na Pomorzu: 1939–1945, Warsaw, Central Commission for the Investigation of Nazi Crimes in Poland — Instytut Pamięci Narodowej, 1989, pages 40, 47, 95, and passim. Google Books ((in English) "The Nazi Criminal-Code Legislation in Pomerania, 1939–1945".)
- Ryszard Kabaciński, Wojciech Kotowski, Jerzy Wojciak, Bydgoszcz: zarys dziejów, ed. R. Kabaciński, Bydgoszcz, Bydgoskie Towarzystwo Naukowe (Regionalna Pracownia Naukowo-Badawcza), 1980, pages 206ff. Google Books ((in English) "Bydgoszcz in a Historical Outline".)
- Kārlis Kangeris, "Latviešu policijas bataljonu izveidošanas otrā fāze — "lielvervēšanas" akcija. 1942.gada februāris–septembris"; in: Okupācijas režīmi Latvijā 1940.–1959. gadā: Latvijas Vēsturnieku komisijas 2002.gada pētījumi — Occupation Regimes in Latvia in 1940–1959: Research of the Commission of the Historians of Latvia (2002), ed. A. Caune, Riga, Latvijas vēstures institūta apgāds, 2004. ISBN 9984601196.
- Bastian Keller, Der Ostfeldzug: Die Wehrmacht im Vernichtungskrieg: Planung, Kooperation, Verantwortung, Hamburg, Diplomica-Verlag, 2012, page 83. ISBN 9783842882676.
- Krausnick, Helmut (1985). Hitlers Einsatzgruppen: Die Truppe des Weltanschauungskrieges, 1938-1942 (in German). Frankfurt am Main: Fischer Taschenbuch. ISBN 978-359624344-0.
- Czesław Madajczyk, Die Okkupationspolitik Nazideutschlands in Polen, 1939–1945, ed. B. Puchert, Berlin, Akademie-Verlag, 1987. ISBN 3050003022. (An author-abbreviated edition of the book originally published in two volumes as Polityka III Rzeszy w okupowanej Polsce, Warsaw, Państwowe Wydawnictwo Naukowe, 1970. Braemer's name is here rendered "Walther Brämer", a common misspelling.)
- Klaus-Michael Mallmann, "'... Mißgeburten, die nicht auf diese Welt gehören': Die deutsche Ordnungspolizei in Polen, 1939–1941"; in: Genesis des Genozids: Polen, 1939-1941, ed. K.-M. Mallmann & B. Musial, (Forschungsstelle Ludwigsburg: Veröffentlichungen der Forschungsstelle Ludwigsburg der Universität Stuttgart series, vol. 3), Darmstadt, WBG: Wissenschaftliche Buchgesellschaft (Auftr. des Deutschen Historischen Instituts Warschau), 2004, pp. 71–89. ISBN 3534180968, ISBN 9783534180967.
- Klaus-Michael Mallmann, Jochen Böhler and Jürgen Matthäus, Einsatzgruppen in Polen: Darstellung und Dokumentation, Darmstadt, WBG: Wissenschaftliche Buchgesellschaft, 2008. ISBN 9783534213535. Google Books
- Michael Müller, Canaris: The Life and Death of Hitler's Spymaster, tr. G. Brooks, London, Chatham Publishing, 2007, pages 162–163. ISBN 9781861763075, ISBN 1861763077, ISBN 9781591141013. (First published as Canaris: Hitlers Abwehrchef, Berlin, Propyläen, 2006. ISBN 9783549072028.)
- Norbert Müller, Wehrmacht und Okkupation, 1941–1944: Zur Rolle der Wehrmacht und ihrer Führungsorgane im Okkupationsregime des faschistischen deutschen Imperialismus auf sowjetischem Territorium, Berlin, Deutscher Militärverlag, 1971. Google Books
- Norbert Müller, et al. ed., Die faschistische Okkupationspolitik in den zeitweilig besetzten Gebieten der Sowjetunion: 1941–1944, (Europa unterm Hakenkreuz series, vol. 5), Berlin, Deutscher Verlag der Wissenschaften, 1991. ISBN 3326003005. Google Books (On Braemer's crimes in the Holocaust in the Ostland.)
- Dieter Pohl, Die Herrschaft der Wehrmacht: Deutsche Militärbesatzung und einheimische Bevölkerung in der Sowjetunion, 1941–1944, Munich, Oldenbourg Wissenschaftsverlag, 2009, pages 39 & 54. ISBN 9783486591743.
- Kim C. Priemel, "Sommer 1941: Die Wehrmacht in Litauen"; in: Holocaust in Litauen: Krieg, Judenmorde und Kollaboration im Jahre 1941, ed. V. Bartusevičius, et al., Cologne, Böhlau Verlag, 2003, pp. 34–35. ISBN 3412139025.
- Edmund Pyszczyński, "'Akcja Tannenberg' w Bydgoszczy w okresie od 5 IX do 20 XI 1939 r."; in: Z okupacyjnych dziejów Bydgoszczy, ed. J. Wiśniowski & J. Sziling, (Bydgoskie Towarzystwo Naukowe: Prace Wydziału Nauk Humanistycznych series E, No. 10), Warsaw, Państwowe Wydawnictwo Naukowe, 1977, pages 51–80. Google Books (Essay title (in English) "Operation Tannenberg in Bydgoszcz between 5 September and 20 November 1939"; book title (in English) "From the History of the City of Bydgoszcz under Nazi Occupation".)
- Gerald Reitlinger, The House Built on Sand: The Conflicts of German Policy in Russia, 1939–1945, London, Weidenfeld and Nicolson, 1960, pages 150–151, 433. (Reitlinger refers to Braemer as "Friedrich Braemer", apparently following Dallin, German Rule in Russia, 1941–1945, see above. Dates for Braemer's service in the Ostland given on p. 433 are incorrect.)
- Timm C. Richter, "Herrenmensch" und "Bandit": Deutsche Kriegsführung und Besatzungspolitik als Kontext des sowjetischen Partisanenkrieges, 1941–44, Münster, Lit, 1998, pages 44–45. ISBN 3825836800.
- Timm C. Richter, "Die Wehrmacht und der Partisanenkrieg in den besetzten Gebieten der Sowjetunion"; in: Die Wehrmacht: Mythos und Realität, ed. R.-D. Müller & H.-E. Volkmann, Munich, R. Oldenbourg Verlag, 1999, pages 847–848. ISBN 3486563831.
- W. Röhr, et al. ed.,Die faschistische Okkupationspolitik in Polen: 1939–1945, (Nacht über Europa: Die Okkupationspolitik des deutschen Faschismus, 1938–1945 series, vol. 2), Cologne, Pahl-Rugenstein Verlag, 1989, pages 95, 113–114. ISBN 3760912605, ISBN 9783760912608.
- Alexander B. Rossino, Hitler Strikes Poland: Blitzkrieg, Ideology, and Atrocity, Lawrence (Kansas), University Press of Kansas, 2003. ISBN 0700612343.
- Günter Schubert, Das Unternehmen "Bromberger Blutsonntag": Tod einer Legende, Cologne, Bund-Verlag, 1989, page 76. ISBN 3766321013.
- Andreas Schulz, Günter Wegmann, Die Generale der Waffen-SS und der Polizei, vol. 3 (Lammerding–Plesch), Bissendorf, Biblio-Verlag, 2008, page 282. ISBN 3764823755, ISBN 9783764823757. Google Books (On the Braemer-ordered massacre of "Swedish Heights".)
- Edward Serwański, Dywersja niemiecka i zbrodnie hitlerowskie w Bydgoszczy na tle wydarzeń w dniu 3 IX 1939, 2nd ed., corr. & enl., Poznań, Wydawnictwo Poznańskie, 1984. ISBN 8321004601. Google Books ((in English) "The German Subversives and the Nazi War Crimes in Bydgoszcz in the light of the Events of 3 September 1939".)
- Jan Sziling ed.,Jesień 1939: dokumentacja pierwszych miesięcy okupacji niemieckiej na Pomorzu Gdańskim, Toruń, Toruńskie Towarzystwo Kultury, 1989, pages 71–72. Google Books ((in English) "The Autumn of 1939: Documents Relating to the First Months of the Nazi Occupation of Pomerelia".)
- Umbreit, Hans (1977). Deutsche Militärverwaltungen, 1938/39: Die militärische Besetzung der Tschechoslowakei und Polens. Beiträge zur Militär- und Kriegsgeschichte (in German). Vol. 18. Stuttgart: Deutsche Verlags-Anstalt. pp. 70, 143. ISBN 3421017948.
- Michael Wildt, An Uncompromising Generation: The Nazi Leadership of the Reich Security Main Office, tr. T. Lampert, Madison (Wisconsin), University of Wisconsin Press, 2009. ISBN 9780299234645. (First published as Generation des Unbedingten: Das Führungskorps des Reichssicherheitshauptamtes, Hamburg, Hamburger Edition, 2002.)
- Hans-Heinrich Wilhelm, "Personelle Kontinuitäten in baltischen Angelegenheiten auf deutscher Seite von 1917/19 bis zum Zweiten Weltkrieg"; in: The Baltic in International Relations between the Two World Wars: Symposium organized by the Centre for Baltic Studies, November 11–13, 1986, University of Stockholm, Frescati, ed. J. Hiden & A. Loit, Stockholm, Centre for Baltic Studies, University of Stockholm, 1988, pages 157–170. ISBN 9122011943. Google Books
- Edmund Żurek, Przywróceni życiu, Warsaw, Wydawnictwo MON, 1976. Google Books ((in English) "Those Brought Back to Life".)
