= Boryszew massacre =

Nazi massacre of Poles in 1939

- Part of the Invasion of Poland (1939)
- Boryszew massacre (Poland)
- Location: 52°12′49″N 20°13′34″E; Boryszew, Poland
- Date: September 22, 1939
- Attack type: Mass murder
- Deaths: 50
- Perpetrator: Wehrmacht

The Boryszew massacre, which took place on September 22, 1939, in the village of Boryszew (now a district of Sochaczew), was a war crime committed by the Wehrmacht during its invasion of Poland. On that day, 50 Polish prisoners of war from the "Bydgoszcz" Battalion of National Defense were executed following a kangaroo court trial. The massacre was carried out in retaliation for the battalion’s participation in the events of the so-called "Bloody Sunday" in Bydgoszcz.

== Prelude ==
The "Bydgoszcz" Battalion was part of the Polish territorial military formation known as the National Defense (Obrona Narodowa). During the September Campaign of 1939, it was incorporated into the 15th Infantry Division and followed almost the entire combat trail of the Pomeranian Army. According to the division’s official history, on September 3, 1939, the battalion engaged German irregular forces in Bydgoszcz. During this time, the violent events known as "Bloody Sunday" took place in Bydgoszcz, later portrayed by Nazi propaganda as a mass scale pogrom against local Volksdeutsche.

In the following days, the battalion participated in the Battle of Bzura, suffering heavy losses. It was ultimately defeated near Iłów, where around 200 soldiers were taken prisoner by the Germans. On September 17, these prisoners were transferred to Żyrardów, where nearly 30,000 captured Polish Army soldiers were already being held in a makeshift POW camp set up on the grounds of the city stadium.

Shortly thereafter, the Germans systematically identified and isolated almost all of the soldiers from the "Bydgoszcz" Battalion from the mass of prisoners. To achieve this, they spread a false rumor in the camp, claiming that prisoners from Pomerelia would be the first to be released. On September 21, 179 soldiers from the "Bydgoszcz" Battalion, along with a dozen or so prisoners from other units who falsely claimed to belong to the battalion in hopes of early release, were transported to Sochaczew under heavy guard.

The reason for this selection process was a report submitted by a man named Lorentz, a Polish Army cadet of German nationality, (Note: Lorentz was a soldier of the 59th Infantry Regiment and a native of Inowrocław.) who alleged that soldiers from the battalion had murdered members of the German minority during "Bloody Sunday" in Bydgoszcz.

== Kangaroo court trial and massacre ==
On September 22, 1939, the Germans convened a session of the so-called "Divisional Court Martial" (Note: To this day, the exact German division to which the soldiers responsible for the Boryszew massacre belonged has not been determined. It is only known that the division was part of the 8th Army, commanded by General Johannes Blaskowitz.) in the village of Boryszew (now a district of Sochaczew), presided over by an unidentified major. At the start of the proceedings, Lorentz addressed the soldiers of the Bydgoszcz Battalion, declaring:

These are the greatest butchers and bloodsuckers, because only such people served in this battalion.

The German judges interrogated all officers and non-commissioned officers, as well as one soldier from each company, in the building of what is today the Cultural Center. They then ordered all Volksdeutsche to step forward. Two men—Antoni Uibel and Walter Rogowski—complied. Others who were called forward included spouses from mixed Polish-German marriages, graduates of German schools, medics, fathers of large families, and World War I veterans who had served in the Imperial German Army. Additionally, all prisoners who did not belong to the "Bydgoszcz" Battalion were separated from the group. From among the remaining prisoners, the German major selected all officers and—at random—some soldiers, forming a group of 50 prisoners.

These prisoners were then informed that they had been sentenced to death. The verdict was read in German and Polish by a Captain Schopelius. It stated:

Despite the fact that all Polish witnesses testified that the battalion did not take part in 'Bloody Sunday' and was not even in Bydgoszcz at that time, it was determined—based solely on the testimony of a German, a Polish Army cadet—that the battalion participated in the murder of German civilians. In retaliation for the murder of 5,000 Germans in Bydgoszcz, 50 soldiers of this battalion will be shot.

The battalion's acting commander, Captain Roman Kłoskowski, demanded the right to a final statement, but the Germans refused, brutally shoving him back into line.

The 50 condemned prisoners were then led to a nearby brickyard. At 7:00 p.m., they were executed by machine gun fire over a previously dug grave. The wounded were finished off with pistol shots. The execution was clearly heard by the remaining soldiers of the battalion.

Allegedly, before his death, one of the battalion's soldiers shouted:

We fought for Poland! We die for Poland!

== Aftermath ==
On November 8, 1940, thanks to the efforts of the Polish Red Cross, the remains of the victims of the Boryszew massacre were exhumed. At that time, 20 bodies were identified. All the remains were then transferred to the cemetery in Kozłów Biskupi, where they were buried in a mass grave.

It was not until 1959 that a concrete grave border was constructed, and a granite cross along with a plaque bearing an inscription was placed:

September 22, 1939
We fought for Poland!
We die for Poland!
Hail to the Heroes!

In 1981, a monument was unveiled at the grave of the victims, along with a plaque listing the names of all 50 victims of the massacre. These names had been established in 1976 by the historian Rajmund Kuczma from Bydgoszcz.

== Bibliography ==
- Bartnicki, Jerzy (1985). Bydgoszcz w roku 1939 [Bydgoszcz in 1939] (in Polish). Bydgoszcz: Kujawsko-Pomorskie Towarzystwo Kulturalne.
- Datner, Szymon (1961). Zbrodnie Wehrmachtu na jeńcach wojennych armii regularnych w II wojnie światowej [Wehrmacht crimes against prisoners of war in World War II] (in Polish). Wydawnictwo MON.
- Dymek, Przemysław (2013). 15. Dywizja Piechoty w wojnie 1939 roku [15th Infantry Division in the war of 1939] (in Polish). Warszawa: Oficyna Wydawnicza Ajaks, Taktyka i Strategia. ISBN 978-8362046-49-2.
- Jastrzębski, Włodzimierz (1974). Terror i zbrodnia. Eksterminacja ludności polskiej i żydowskiej w rejencji bydgoskiej w latach 1939–1945 [Terror and Crime. Extermination of the Polish and Jewish Population in the Bydgoszcz Regierungsbezirk in 1939–1945] (in Polish). Warszawa: Interpress.
- Kuczma, Rajmund (2000). "W obronie ojczyzny". Bydgoski Batalion Obrony Narodowej ["In defense of the homeland". Bydgoszcz Battalion of the National Defense] (in Polish). Bydgoszcz: Miejski Komitet Ochrony Pamięci Walk i Męczeństwa w Bydgoszczy. ISBN 83-912574-9-5.
