= Bloody Sunday (1939) =

Massacre in Poland during the 1939 invasion by Nazi Germany

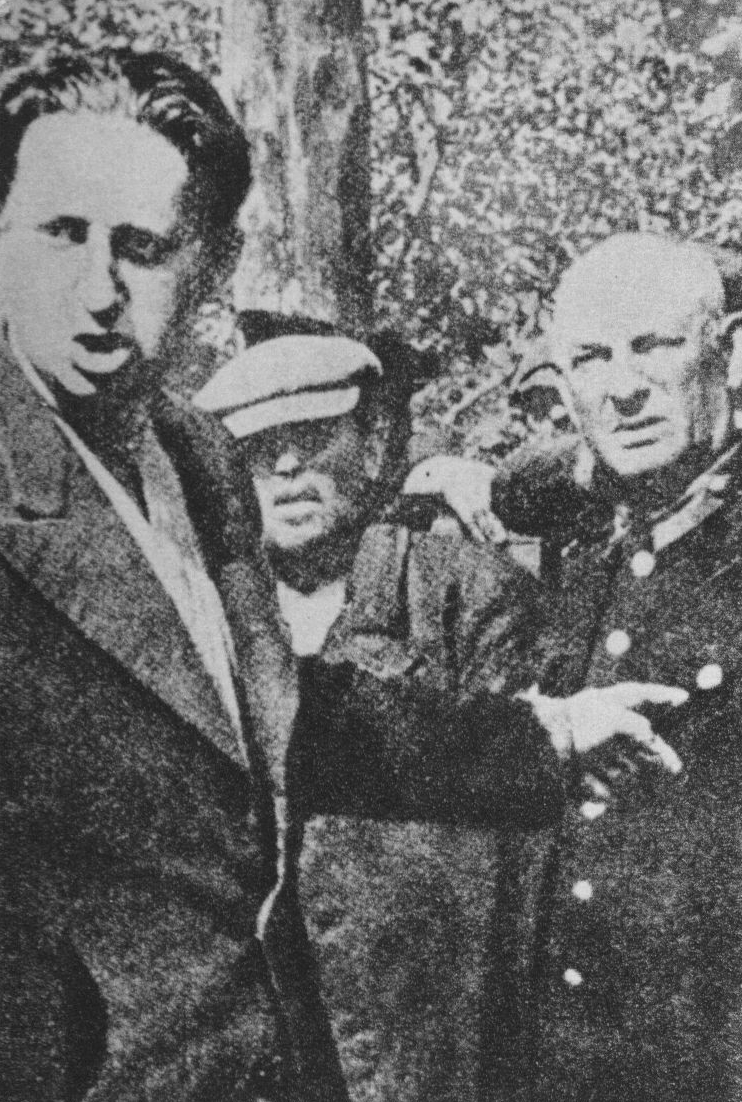
An ethnic German identifying a Pole as an alleged participant in anti-German violence in Bydgoszcz during "Bloody Sunday". Poles denounced in this way were usually shot on the spot.

Bloody Sunday (German: Bromberger Blutsonntag; Polish: Krwawa niedziela) was a sequence of violent events that took place in Bydgoszcz (German: Bromberg), a Polish city with a sizable German minority, between 3 and 4 September 1939, during the German invasion of Poland.

Standing in the path of the German army's advance during the early days of the invasion, tensions quickly escalated in Bydgoszcz between the city's sizable German-speaking minority and its Polish majority. On 3 September, as the Wehrmacht was preparing to assault the city, members of the German minority working in conjunction with the German intelligence agency (Abwehr) attacked the Polish garrison. Polish soldiers and civilians reacted with violent reprisals against ethnic Germans, who in turn reacted with more violence. A Polish investigation concluded in 2004 that approximately 40–50 Poles and between 100 and 300 Germans were killed.

The term "Bloody Sunday" was applied to the events by Nazi propaganda officials, who highlighted and exaggerated German casualties. An instruction issued to the press said, "... must show news on the barbarism of Poles against Germans in Bromberg. The expression 'Bloody Sunday' must enter as a permanent term in the dictionary and circumnavigate the globe. For that reason, this term must be continuously underlined."

Approximately 200–400 Polish hostages were shot in a mass execution in the aftermath of the fall of the city on 5 September. Additionally, fifty Polish prisoners of war from Bydgoszcz were accused by Nazi summary courts of taking part in "Bloody Sunday" and shot. The reprisals compounded violence stemming from the German attempts to pacify the city, and the premeditated murder of notable Poles as part of Operation Tannenberg. As part of the latter, the Germans murdered 1,200–3,000 Polish civilians in Bydgoszcz, in a part of the city that became known as the Valley of Death.

== Background ==
Bydgoszcz (Bromberg) was part of the Polish–Lithuanian Commonwealth until 1772, when it was annexed by the Kingdom of Prussia during the First Partition of Poland. As a part of Prussia, the city was affected by the unification of Germany in 1871 and became part of the German Empire. It would remain a part of the German Empire until the end of World War I. In February 1920, the Treaty of Versailles awarded the city and the surrounding region to the Second Polish Republic (the administrative region of Pomeranian Voivodeship). This resulted in a number of ethnic Germans leaving the region for Germany. Over the interwar period, the German population decreased even further.

The emergence of the Nazi Party in Germany had an important impact on the city. Adolf Hitler revitalized the Völkisch movement, making an appeal to the German minority living outside of Germany's post-World War I borders and recruiting its members for Nazi intelligence. It was Hitler's explicit goal to create a Greater German State by annexing territories of other countries inhabited by German minorities. By March 1939, these ambitions, charges of atrocities on both sides of the German-Polish border, distrust, and rising nationalist sentiment in Nazi Germany led to the complete deterioration of Polish-German relations. Hitler's demands for the Polish inhabited Polish Corridor and Polish resistance to Nazi annexation fueled ethnic tensions. For months prior to the 1939 German invasion of Poland, German newspapers and politicians like Adolf Hitler had carried out a national and international propaganda campaign accusing Polish authorities of organizing or tolerating violent ethnic cleansing of ethnic Germans living in Poland.

After Germany invaded Poland on 1 September 1939, ethnic Germans living in Poland were in many places subjected to attacks, and the Polish government arrested ten to fifteen thousand on suspicion of being loyal to Germany, marching them toward the east of the country. Eventually, around 2000 ethnic Germans died in such actions. Nazi propagandists used these incidents to claim that the invasion was justified, and the events in Bydgoszcz became emblematic of this.

== The incident ==
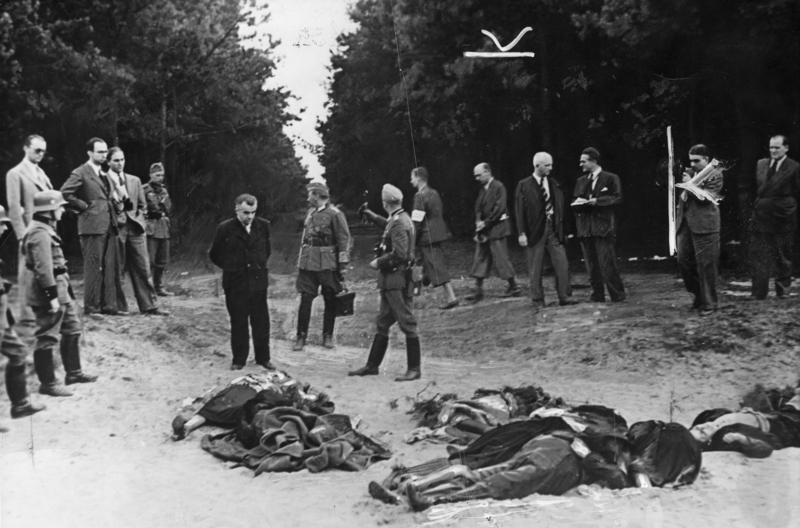
Wehrmacht soldiers and journalists with German victims of Bloody Sunday. The photo was used by the Nazi press and bears the editor's cropping marks, showing the portion of the image that was intended to be used for publication.

Beginning with the Nazi invasion of Poland on 1 September, fighting broke out in Bydgoszcz between Polish troops and ethnic Germans in the city, many of whom were later revealed to belong to clandestine groups organized by the Nazi party. As the Wehrmacht's Fourth Army prepared to storm the city of Bydgoszcz on 3 September, the violence intensified, resulting in the deaths of up to 300 ethnic Germans and 40 to 50 Poles. Sources differ on the circumstances of the killings, but it is apparent that at least some were killed in an anti-German pogrom.

The killings were incited by fifth column attacks by ethnic German partisans against the Polish garrison. According to historian Jochen Böhler, recently unearthed German documents confirm that the violence was sparked when Polish soldiers were attacked by agents of the Nazi intelligence organization Abwehr recruited from among the city's German minority.

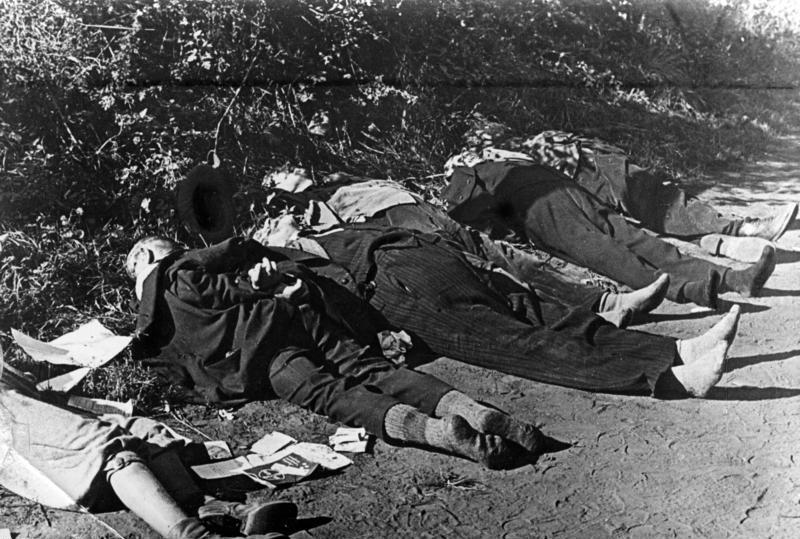
Corpses of ethnic Germans at Bydgoszcz

Beginning in early September, the Abwehr reported in documents prepared by general Erwin von Lahousen that German armed saboteurs conducting operations behind the front line in Bydgoszcz suffered heavy losses. Their operations coordinated by Abwehr residents in Bydgoszcz-Grischner are documented in operational reports and plans in Abwehr archives. Among the tasks allocated to armed saboteur groups documented in German archives were: blowing up the main office of the German organization Deutsche Vereinigung, the passport office Deutsche Paßstelle, the German private school, and setting fire to the German theater and offices of the Jungdeutsche Partei. These operations are documented as coordinated and organized by Schutzstaffel SS. Additionally a special Abwehr sabotage group was located in Bydgoszcz according to German records from Abwehr Breslau department, called Sabotage-Organisationen Gruppe 12 whose task was to disable a local power-plant and cut phone communications between Inowrocław and Toruń.

Besides these sabotage groups in Bydgoszcz, the Abwehr also recorded in its documents paramilitary groups that were formed in the city. According to German records stored in Bundesarchiv-Militärarchiv in Freiburg they counted 150 members in Kampf-Organisation under leadership of a local German named Kleiss and were part of a larger military formation coordinated from Poznan which altogether had 2,077 members. In addition to this group a 10-member combat unit under command of a German named Otto Meister was also formed in Bydgoszcz and received orders from Wrocław local office of Abwehr. By the end of August just before the invasion took place Polish police conducted several arrests during which they found explosives, armbands and guns.

During the night between 2 and 3 September a number of German saboteurs dressed up in Polish uniforms woke up inhabitants of two districts in Bydgoszcz telling them to run as Poland has been defeated, and as a result a significant number of civilians panicked and started fleeing the city. The chaotic flight disrupted and restricted movements of the Polish military on the roads.

By the morning of 3 September a certain few Germans who were in good relationship with their Polish neighbors started warning them to hide as "something bad will happen in the city", offering them shelter under the condition that they must hide by 10 AM, but stated they could not disclose details on what would take place.

As a contingent of the Polish Army (Army Pomorze's 9th, 15th, and 27th Infantry Division) was withdrawing through Bydgoszcz it was attacked by German irregulars from within the city. According to a British witness, a retreating Polish artillery unit was shot at by Germans from within a house; the Poles returned fire and were subsequently shot at from a Jesuit church. In the ensuing fight both sides suffered some casualties; captured German nonuniformed armed insurgents were executed on the spot and some mob lynching was also reported. A Polish investigation concluded in 2004 that Polish troops had been shot at by members of the German minority and German military intelligence (Abwehr) agents; around 40–50 Poles and between 100 and 300 Germans were killed.

The German forces which entered the city also encountered resistance from members of the paramilitary Citizen Watch (Straż Obywatelska), particularly in the Szwederowo neighborhood, which was predominantly inhabited by working-class individuals. The Citizen Watch in Bydgoszcz relinquished its weapons after receiving assurances from General Eccard von Gablenz, commander of the Kampgruppe "Netze", that its members would be treated in accordance with international law as POWs.

== German propaganda ==
Goebbels' Propaganda Ministry heavily exploited the events to try to gain support in Germany for the invasion. As British historian Ian Kershaw wrote:

For German propaganda, the attacks on ethnic Germans were exploited as an apparent justification for a policy of 'ethnic cleansing' that had surpassed in its first days anything that could be regarded as retaliation. The Germans claimed in November 1939 5,400 had been killed in the 'September Murders' (including what they dubbed the 'Bromberg Bloody Sunday'). Then, in February 1940, on Hitler's own instructions (it was later claimed) this was simply multiplied by around ten-fold and a figure of 58,000 German dead invented. The most reliable estimates put the total number of ethnic Germans killed in outrages, forced marches, bombing and shelling at around 4,000. Terrible though these atrocities were, they were more or less spontaneous outbursts of hatred that took place in the context of panic and fear following the German invasion. They did not remotely compare with, let alone provide any justification for, the calculated savagery of the treatment meted out by the German masters, directed at wiping out anything other than a slave existence for the Polish people.

Hitler's secret decree of 4 October 1939 stated that all crimes committed by the Germans between 1 September 1939 and 4 October 1939 were not to be prosecuted.

The Wehrmacht War Crimes Bureau investigation in 1939–1940 claimed that the events were a result of panic and confusion among the Polish troops. The Wehrmacht investigation included the interrogation of captive Polish soldiers, ethnic Germans from Bydgoszcz and surrounding villages, and Polish civilians. The bodies of the victims were exhumed and the cause of death and the possible involvement of military rifles was assessed.

== German reprisals and atrocities ==
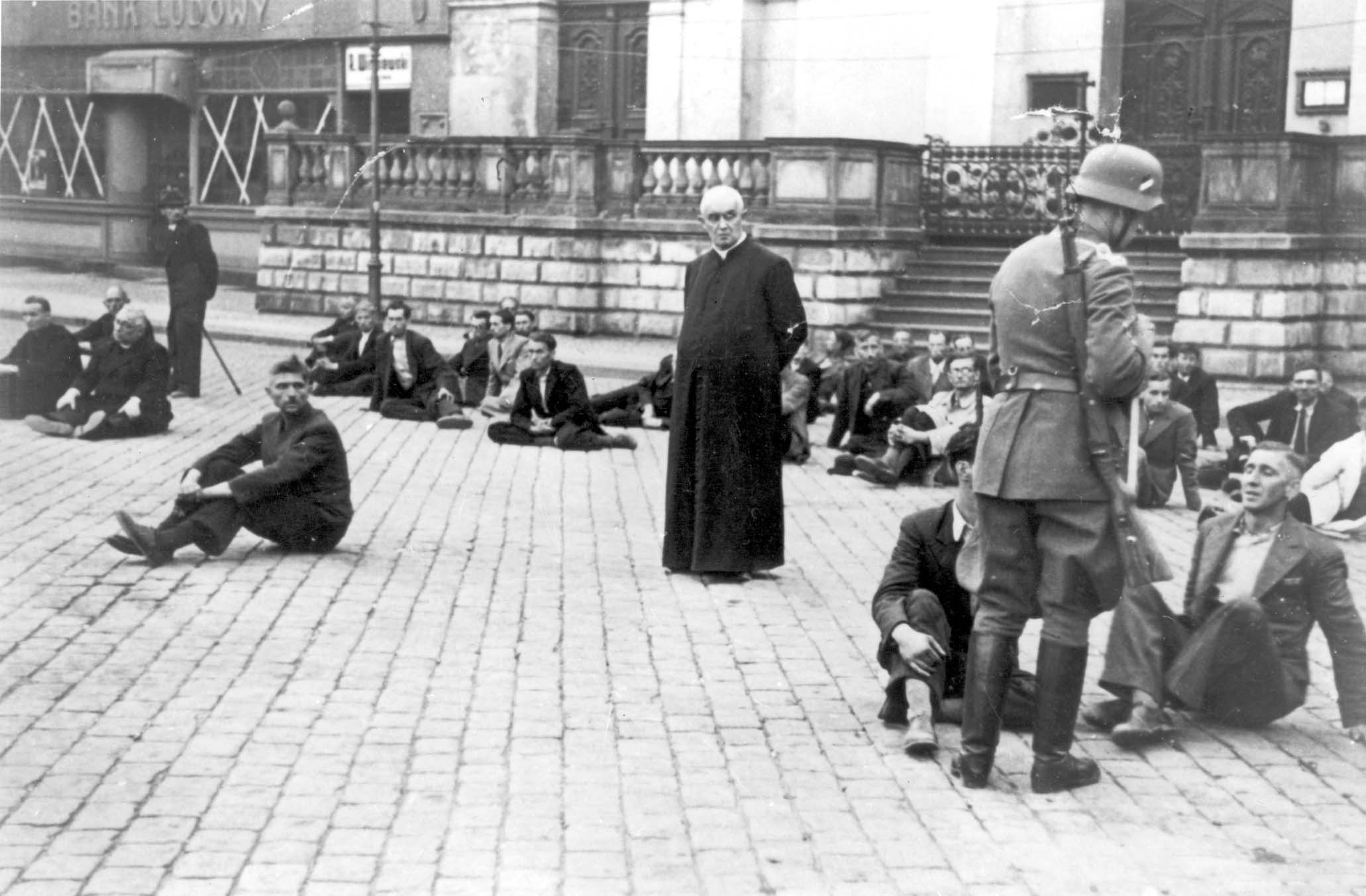
Polish hostages in Bydgoszcz. September 1939

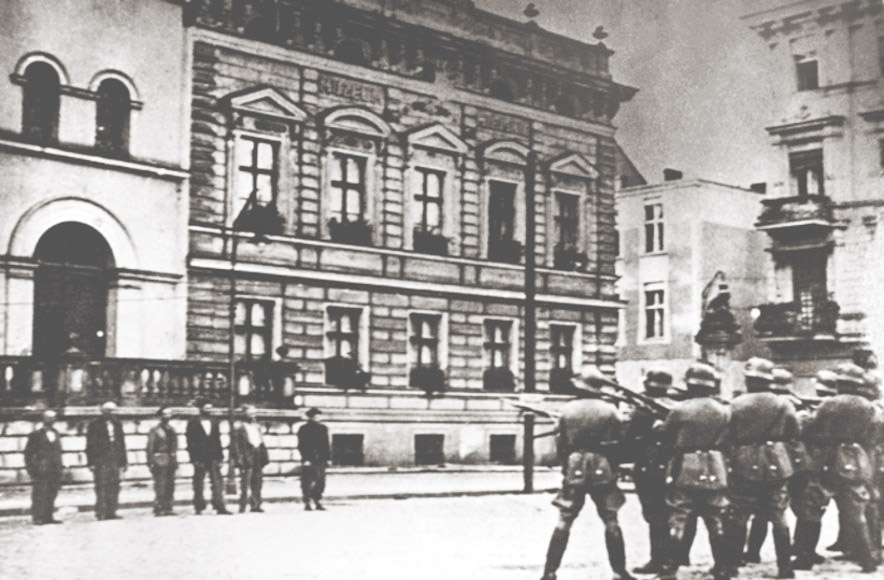
Poles shot by Germans in Bydgoszcz, 9 September 1939

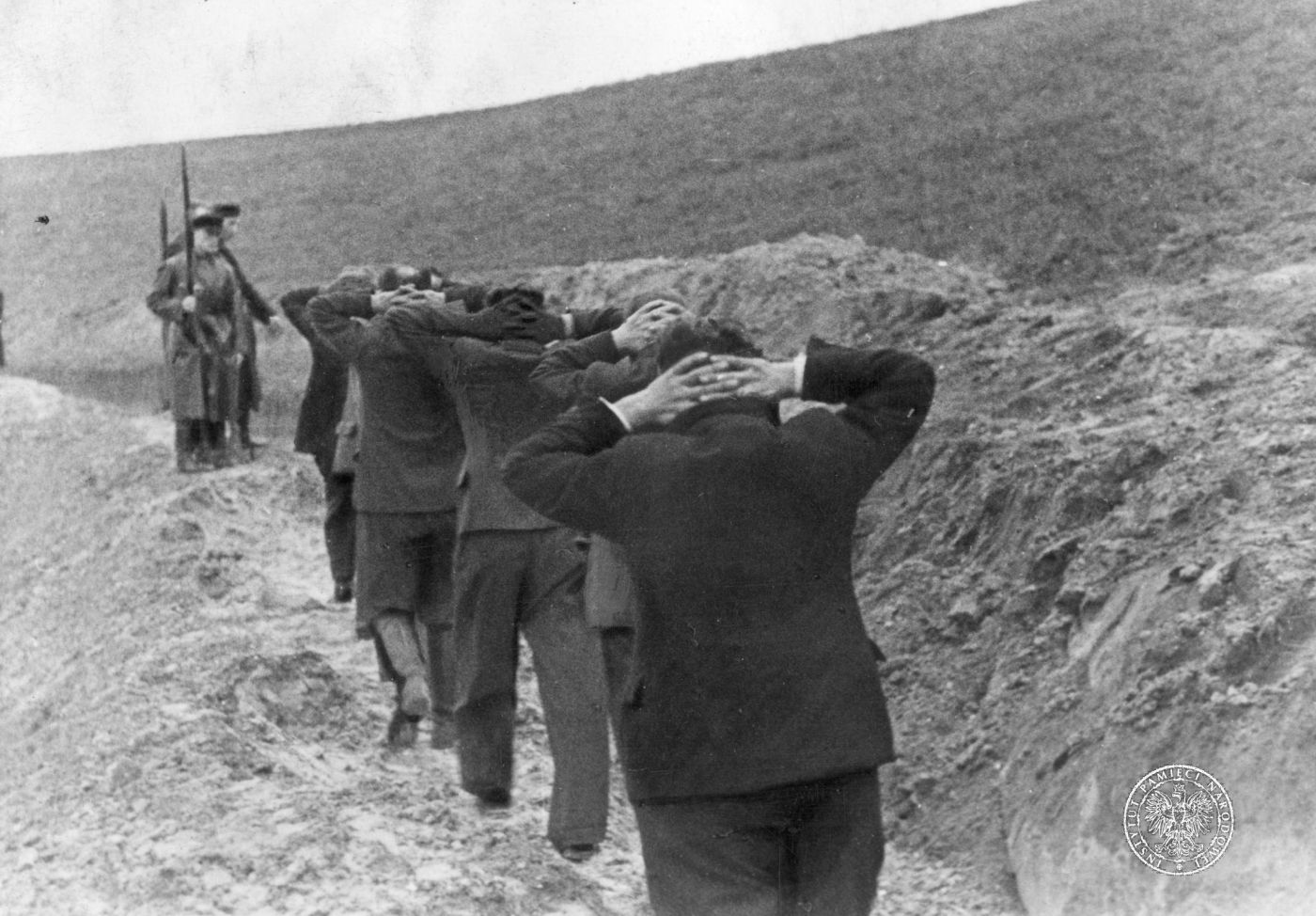
Polish teachers from Bydgoszcz are led for execution in Death Valley, November 1, 1939

The events were followed by German reprisals and mass executions of Polish civilians. In an act of retaliation for Bloody Sunday, a number of Polish civilians were executed by German military units of the Einsatzgruppen, Waffen SS, and Wehrmacht. According to German historian Christian Raitz von Frentz, 876 Poles were tried by German tribunal for involvement in the events of Bloody Sunday before the end of 1939. 87 men and 13 women were sentenced without the right to appeal. Polish historian Czesław Madajczyk notes 120 executions in relation to Bloody Sunday, and the execution of 20 hostages after a German soldier was allegedly attacked by a Polish sniper.

The assurances issued to the Citizen Watch which surrendered after being promised that they were to be treated in accordance with international law as POWs were not upheld by the Germans. The captured Citizen Watch members were handed over by the Wehrmacht to members of Einsatzgruppe IV. Approximately 40 prisoners were subjected to fatal beatings by SS men using metal rods. The remaining POWs, which included the leaders of the Citizen Watch, Konrad Fiedler and Marian Maczuga, were executed by gunfire in the Bielawki neighborhood of Bydgoszcz.

Additionally, in the Boryszew massacre fifty Polish prisoners of war from Bydgoszcz were accused by Nazi summary courts for taking part in "Bloody Sunday" and shot.

According to a German version, Polish snipers attacked German troops in Bydgoszcz for several days (Polish sources and witnesses do not confirm this). The German governor, General Walter Braemer, (the commander of the rear army area), ordered the execution of 80 Polish hostages over the next few days. By September 8, between 200 and 400 Polish civilians had been killed. According to Richard Rhodes, a number of Boy Scouts were set up in the marketplace against a wall and shot; a devoted priest who rushed to administer the last sacrament was shot too, receiving five wounds. Murders continued all week; 34 of the leading tradespeople and merchants of the town were shot, as well as many other leading citizens.

Many Poles, particularly members of the intelligentsia and the Jews, were singled out for deportation, or killed outright. By December 1939 the Germans killed 5,000 Polish civilians from the Bydgoszcz County (about a third from Bydgoszcz itself). These victims included the mayor of Bydgoszcz, Leon Barciszewski Many of those killings took place in a part of the city that became known as the Valley of Death. More broadly, they were also related to the wider Operation Tannenberg, a large scale anti-Polish extermination actions. More than 20,000 Polish citizens of Bydgoszcz (14% of the population) were either shot or died in concentration camps during the occupation.

== The debate in scholarship ==
The exact number of victims of Bloody Sunday is disputed. Peter Aurich (a pseudonym of the German journalist Peter Nasarski) put the number of German civilian deaths in Bydgoszcz at 366, while Hugo Rasmus estimates it as at least 415. Two Polish historians, Włodzimierz Jastrzębski and Czesław Madajczyk, estimate ethnic German deaths at 103 (Jastrzębski), and about 300 (150 on September 3, the rest in the days after). The Polish historians point out that since these losses occurred during actual combat, most of the civilian losses should be attributed to accidents common in urban combat conditions; they argue that civilian losses might have occurred when the town was attacked by the German air force (Luftwaffe). Strafing of civilians in the town by the Luftwaffe is confirmed by German witnesses. Nazi propaganda reinforced Polish perceptions of the German minority as hostile, and during the invasion reported that the German minority was aiding the forces. This contributed to Polish misconceptions, as the Poles were expecting the German minority to be actively hostile.

An even bigger debate in the scholarship concerned the question whether—as the Polish historiography suggests—there were indeed any members of a German fifth column in the city who opened fire on the Polish troops (and if so, whether they were composed of members of the Bydgoszcz German minority or not), or whether—as critics among the German historiography argue—Polish troops (or panicking civilians) overreacted in the confusion and targeted innocent German civilians. This debate has been resolved by investigation of German archives, which confirmed existence of several diversion and saboteur groups in Bydgoszcz overseen by intelligence organizations by Nazi Germany. Among the Germans killed in the fighting historians identified Otto Niefeldt who was an Abwehr agent from Szczecin. The account of Peter Nasarski alias Aurich has been called by Harry Gordon one of the most thorough German accounts; his work is however generally rejected in Poland, perhaps because he indiscriminately used witness statements collected by Nazi officials. According to Nasarski, after police forces retreated from Bydgoszcz, agitated Polish civilians accused many Germans of assaulting Polish soldiers and executed them and any Poles who stood up in their defence. Rasmus attributes the situation to confusion and the disorganised state of the Polish forces in the city.

Von Frentz wrote that "In Bydgoszcz, the event was probably caused by confusion among the rapidly retreating soldiers, a general breakdown in public order and panic among the Polish majority after two German air raids and the discovery of a small reconnaissance group of the German Army on the previous day." He quotes Nazi German reports about the civilian victims and atrocities, later corroborated by a Red Cross commission that the Nazis invited to the scene. Von Frentz also noted that eyewitness accounts of atrocities committed against the German population are as unreliable as Polish accounts of the fifth columnists. While authors like Blanke write that no ethnic Germans are known to have spoken of participation in that event, by 2007 Nazi documents were uncovered confirming that assistance, supplies and aid were given to both German saboteurs and their families. In the post-war collaboration trials, no ethnic German was charged in relation to Bloody Sunday. Another counterargument that was made to the fifth column theory is that Polish troops were being targeted by advance units of the German regular army (Heer), or that the shots were fired by Polish soldiers in the confusion of the mass withdrawal. Von Frentz claims that Polish troops and civilians massacred German civilians due to confusion.

Polish historians, such as Madajczyk, Jastrzębski, Karol Marian Pospieszalski and Ryszard Wojan claim that the killings were triggered when the ethnic Germans, dressed as civilians, opened fire on the Polish troops (Jastrzebski later changed his views after starting to work with German expellee organizations). The Poles retaliated, killing many and executing prisoners afterwards. Polish historians Pospieszalski and Janusz Kutta point to a Nazi top secret false flag Operation Himmler (which took place on August 31 – September 1) and was designed to create an illusion of Polish aggression against Germany. Thus it is argued that actions like the Gleiwitz incident and events in Bydgoszcz were all part of a larger Nazi plan to discredit the Poles. Pospieszalski and Wojan argue that the German fifth column agents (or their higher-ups) might have been deliberately aiming to produce a situation likely to result in German civilian casualties as a way to fuel Nazi propaganda. This argument has been criticized: Harry Gordon questions whether the Germans were willing to sacrifice their citizens for propaganda gains.

== Recent discussion ==
The modern consensus among Polish historians is that the events constituted an attack on the Polish population and military by German militia.

In 2004, historian Tomasz Chinciński in a publication of Institute of National Remembrance (IPN) summarized recent research related to Bloody Sunday, confirming that the majority of historians agree that an "insurrection" by agents who had arrived from the Third Reich as well as some German inhabitants of Bydgoszcz took place. He has published a work detailing new evidence of German diversionary activity in September 1939 in Poland. There are numerous Polish eyewitness accounts of action of a German fifth column which included members of local minority; Pospieszalski cited multiple witnesses for at least 46 cases of German civilians opening fire on Polish troops. There are numerous Polish Army reports and German documents confirming the saboteur actions of armed German Poles in other cities. According to German historians, any members of the fifth column, if present in the city, were infiltrators from Germany, not natives of Bydgoszcz. Eyewitness accounts have been criticised by Richard Blanke. In 2004, Chinciński discussed previously unpublished reports of Polish Army Pomorze, which reported "a large scale diversion" in Bydgoszcz on September 3 and numerous smaller incidents in surrounding area around that time.

A number of Polish and German historians discussed the problem on September 4, 2006, at the German Historical Institute in Warsaw. Chinciński discussed newly discovered documents of the Abwehr that show that there were indeed plans for fifth column and diversion activities in Bydgoszcz; several paramilitary groups were organized by Germany in the city, he discussed the bias of the Polish communist era historiography, which minimized cases of Polish mob lynching of ethnic Germans, which did occur in Bydgoszcz. German historian Hans-Erich Volkmann noted problems with German historiography, outlining some of the unreliability inherent in early post-war studies, which were still significantly affected by the Nazi era, and that the Bydgoszcz events were and still are used for political purposes. By 2007 after several years of studying German archives, documents were uncovered in which General Erwin Lahousen praised action of German saboteurs in Bydgoszcz and organized delivery of supplies and medical help to them. German historian Jochen Böhler, in his publication about the invasion of Poland, published in 2006, wrote that new documents uncovered from the German archives proved that Polish soldiers were attacked by Abwehr agents and members of the German minority.

== See also ==
- Valley of Death
- Stanisław Wiórek
- Tongzhou mutiny

== Literature ==
- MacAlister Brown, 'The Third Reich's Mobilization of the German Fifth Column in Eastern Europe', The Journal for Central European Affairs 19/2 (Jul. 1959)
- Wojan, Ryszard (1959). Bydgoszcz Niedziela 3 września 1939 (in Polish). Poznań: Wydawnictwo Poznańskie.
- Jastrzębski, Włodzimierz (1988). Dywersja czy masakra. Cywilna obrona Bydgoszczy we wrześniu 1939 r. (in Polish). Gdańsk: KAW. ISBN 83-03-02193-1.
- Schubert, Günter (1989). Das Unternehmen "Bromberger Blutsonntag" (in German). Köln: Bund-Vlg.
- (in Polish) T. Esman, W. Jastrzębski, Pierwsze miesiące okupacji hitlerowskiej w Bydgoszczy w źródeł dokumentów niemieckich, Bydgoszcz, 1967
- (in Polish) Włodzimierz Jastrzębski, Tzw. Bydgoska Krwawa Niedziela w Świetle Zachodnioniemieckiej Literatury Historycznej, 1983
- (in Polish) Szymon Datner, Z dziejow dywersji niemieckiej w czasie kampanii wrześniowej, Wojskowy Przeglad Historyczny 4/1959
- (in Polish) Marian Wojciechowski, Geneza dywersji hitlerowskiej w Bydgoszczy w świetle historiografii i publicystyki polskiej,, Bygdoskie Towarzystwo Naukowe, Prace Komisji Historii, 1967
- (in French) Edmund Zarzycki, La Diversion Allemande le 3 Septembre 1939 a Bydgoszcz à la Lumiere des Actes du Tribunal Special Hitlerien de la Ville, 279–94 in Polish Western Affairs/La Pologne et les Affaires Occidentales 22/2(1981)
- (in French) Tadeusz Jasowski, 'La Diversion Hitlerienne le 3 Septembre 1939 a Bydgoszcz,' 295–308, in Polish Western Affairs/La Pologne et les Affaires Occidentales 22/2(1981)
- Chinciński, Tomasz; Machcewicz, Paweł, eds. (2008). Bydgoszcz 3–4 września 1939 (in Polish). Warszawa: IPN. ISBN 978-83-60464-76-2.
- Böhler, Jochen (2006). Auftakt zum Vernichtungskrieg. Die Wehrmacht in Polen 1939 (in German). Frankfurt: Fischer Taschenbuch Verlag. ISBN 3-596-16307-2.
- Chinciński, Tomasz; Machcewicz, Paweł, eds. (2008). Bydgoszcz 3–4 września 1939 (in Polish). Warszawa: Instytut Pamięci Narodowej. ISBN 978-83-60464-76-2.
