= Stanisław Wiórek =

Polish clergyman

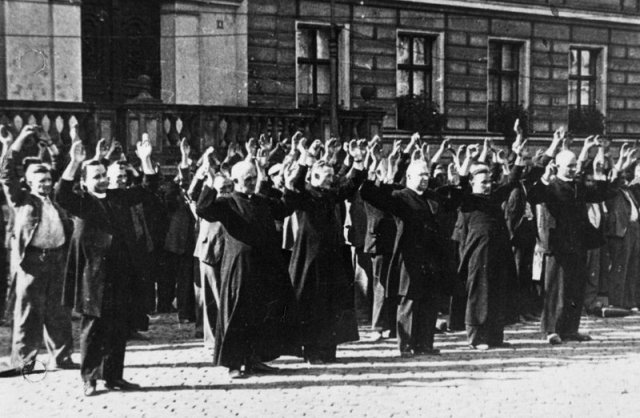
Public execution by the Nazis of Polish hostages in Bydgoszcz's Old Market Square 9 September 1939

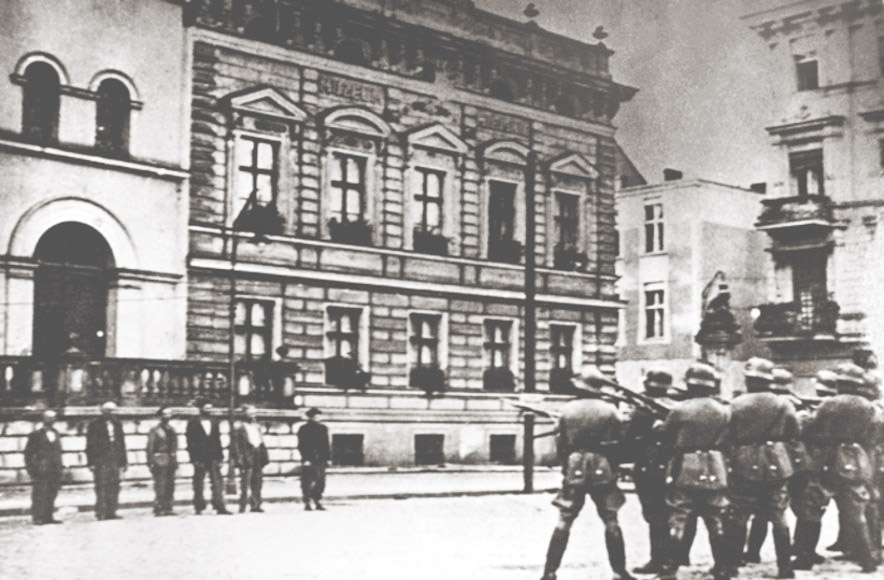
The moment of death Bydgoszcz's Old Market Square 9 September 1939

Stanisław Wiórek or alternatively Stanisław Wiorek (12 December 1912 – 9 September 1939) was a Polish theologian and Catholic clergyman, member of the Congregation of the Mission, publicly murdered by the Nazis on the ninth day of the Second World War.

He has in recent years been accorded the title of Servant of God and is in the process of being beatified by the Catholic Church.

== Life and death ==
Wiórek was born on 12 December 1912 in Bottrop in the extreme south-west corner of the then Province of Westphalia on 12 December 1912, and joined the Lazarists at Kraków in Poland in 1930. He studied theology at Kraków and subsequently at the Angelicum in Rome, where he took holy orders in 1938, the year before his death. According to some sources, he was ordained at Kraków in 1938, during the period of his studies in Italy, which were briefly interrupted for the purpose.

He returned from Rome to Poland in 1939, going directly to Bydgoszcz where he was supposed to take up ministry in the local church, in the Bielawki area of the city (see Bielawy). As after the Nazi invasion of Poland the Germans issued an ordinance requiring the registration of the population, Wiórek left the premises of his religious institute on Saturday, 9 September 1939, in company with another priest, Piotr Szarek (1908–1939), in order to complete the required formalities. While in a street outside, he was caught in a łapanka, a random rounding-up of Polish hostages in reprisal for what the Nazi propaganda portrayed as anti-German events of the so-called Bloody Sunday of 3 September 1939, six days earlier. The randomly detained passers-by were brought to Bydgoszcz's historic Old Market Square (the Stary Rynek), a prominent central place where they were displayed and harassed before twenty-five of them were summarily executed in public by a firing squad at about 12 noon. Wiórek was killed together with his companion, Piotr Szarek who, having shown signs of life after the salvo of shots rang out, was dealt an individual coup de grâce. Their bodies were displayed in the Old Market Square for six hours, from about 12 noon to 6 p.m. Stanisław Wiórek was twenty six years' old.

There is an eyewitness account of Wiórek's martyrdom given by Helena Kozłowska, a pharmacist who was working at the time in the Stary Rynek (Old Market Square). Wiórek's body, together with that of Szarek, is buried in the Cemetery of the Heroes of Bydgoszcz (Cmentarz Bohaterów Bydgoszczy) in Bydgoszcz.

Stanisław Wiórek is currently one of the 122 Polish martyrs of the Second World War who are included in the beatification process initiated in 1994, whose first beatification session was held in Warsaw in 2003 (see Słudzy Boży). A person nominated for beatification receives within the Roman Catholic Church the title of "Servant of God"; once he is actually beatified he is accorded the title of "Venerable" and "Blessed", which are a prerequisite for sainthood conferred in a process known as canonization.

Wiórek's likeness is depicted pictorially in the stained-glass windows of the Church of Our Lady Revealing the Miraculous Medal located in the Olcza district of the city of Zakopane (the Parafia Najświętszej Maryi Panny Niepokalanej Objawiającej Cudowny Medalik).

== Bibliography ==
- August Hlond, The Persecution of the Catholic Church in German-occupied Poland: Reports presented by H. E. Cardinal Hlond, Primate of Poland, to Pope Pius XII, Vatican Broadcasts, and Other Reliable Evidence, New York, Longmans, Green & Co., 1941, pages 4, 27, 107.
- Poland, Ministry of Information, The Black Book of Poland, New York, G.P. Putnam’s Sons, 1942, pages 24–25, 340, 342. Google Books
- Poland, Ministry of Information, The Nazi Kultur in Poland. By several authors of necessity temporarily anonymous..., London, Published for the Polish Ministry of Information by His Majesty's Stationery Office, 1945, page 9. Google Books
- Ryszard Wojan, Bydgoszcz: niedziela 3 września 1939 r., Poznań, Wydawnictwo Poznańskie (Towarzystwo Rozwoju Ziem Zachodnich. Rada Okręgu Bydgoskiego w Toruniu), 1959, page 68. Google Books
- Kazimierz Borucki, Tablice pamiątkowe Bydgoszczy, Bydgoszcz, Państwowe Wydawnictwo Naukowe (Bydgoskie Towarzystwo Naukowe), 1963, page 45. Google Books
- Janusz Gumkowski & Rajmund Kuczma, Zbrodnie hitlerowskie: Bydgoszcz 1939, Warsaw, Polonia, 1967, page 18. Google Books
- Prace Komisji Historii — Seria C, ed. Z. Grot, Poznań, Państwowe Wydawnictwo Naukowe, 1969, pages 148 & 150. Google Books
- Z okupacyjnych dziejów Bydgoszczy, Warsaw, Państwowe Wydawnictwo Naukowe, 1977, page 64. Google Books
- Przewodnik po upamiętnionych miejscach walk i męczeństwa: lata wojny 1939–1945, 4th ed., augm. & enl., ed. Cz. Czubryt-Borkowski, et al., Warsaw, Sport i Turystyka (Rada Ochrony Pomników Walki i Męczeństwa), 1988, page 101. ISBN 8321727093. Google Books
- Włodzimierz Jastrzębski, Dywersja czy masakra? : cywilna obrona Bydgoszczy we wrześniu 1939 r., Gdańsk, Krajowa Agencja Wydawnicza, 1988, page 132. ISBN 8303021931. Google Books
- "Symbol przetrwania: legenda krwawej ręki" (A Symbol of Endurance: The Legend of a Bloody Handprint); in: Rajmund Kuczma & Jerzy Derenda, Legendy i przypowieści (Biblioteka Bydgoska series), Bydgoszcz, Towarzystwo Miłośników miasta Bydgoszczy, 1992, pages 67–68.
- Janusz Kutta, "Rola Kościoła katolickiego w dziejach Bydgoszczy" (The Role of the Catholic Church in the History of Bydgoszcz), Kronika Bydgoska, vol. 19, ed. W. Jastrzębski, et al., Bydgoszcz, Towarzystwo Miłośników miasta Bydgoszczy, 1998, page 14. ISSN 0454-5451.
- Jerzy Ślaski, Polska walcząca, vol. 2, 3rd ed., augm., Warsaw, Oficyna Wydawnicza Rytm, 1999, page 554. ISBN 8387893315. Google Books
- Wiesław Trzeciakowski, Ślad dłoni na murze: cud na Starym Rynku w Bydgoszczy 9 września 1939 roku, Bydgoszcz, Wiesław Trzeciakowski, 2007. ISBN 978-83-925622-0-7. Google Books

== See also ==
- Intelligenzaktion Pommern
- Valley of Death (Bydgoszcz)
- 108 Martyrs of World War II
- List of Servants of God
