= Karol Marian Pospieszalski =

Polish lawyer and historian

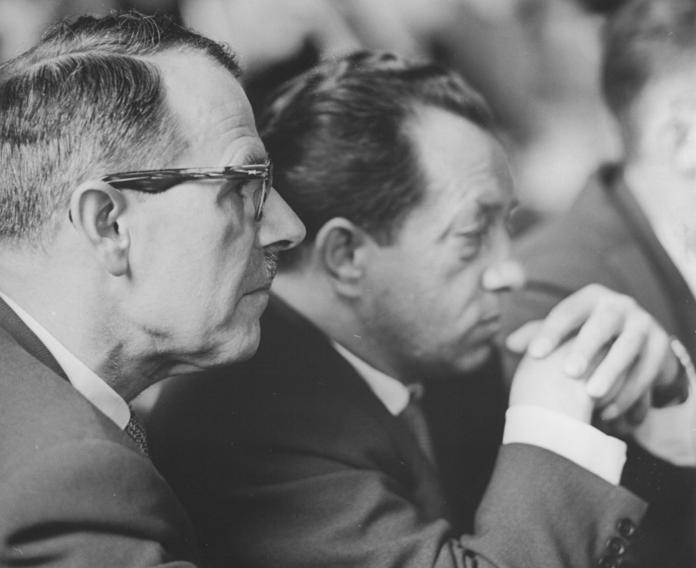
Karol Marian Pospieszalski (1963)

Karol Marian Pospieszalski (11 September 1909 – 19 February 2007) was a Polish lawyer and historian.

Member of the Polish resistance during World War II, he published his first scholarly student underground in occupied Poland in 1943 (about legal status of Poles on occupied territories). During the late 1940s and 1950s in stalinist People's Republic of Poland he was persecuted by the authorities (he was arrested and interrogated by Urząd Bezpieczeństwa). His career and promotions were delayed due to the government seeing him as a member of the opposition. He was a lecturer at the Adam Mickiewicz University in Poznań, where he would become a professor. He retired in 1979.

Honorary citizen of the city of Poznań since 2005.

His area of specialty included Polish-German relations, particularly during the World War II.
