= Gertrude M. Godden =

- Born: 17 July 1867
- Died: 15 February 1947 (aged 79)

Gertrude Mary Godden (17 July 1867– 15 February 1947) was an author of works on anthropology and folklore. Most of her work was written from England and she did not travel.

Gertrude Godden was born in Surbiton, Surrey. Born in a Catholic family, she took a special interest in the rise of Soviet Russia. One of her correspondents was a Father Ledit.

Godden was a fellow of the Anthropological Institute. Amongst her works are papers in the journal Folk-Lore, a manuscript on the Naga and other peoples of Northeast India, and a memoir of Henry Fielding. She also wrote a book on Mussolini.

A namesake, Gertrude M. Godden O.B.E., was president (1956–58) of the Royal College of Nursing in London.
