= Jochen Böhler =

German historian

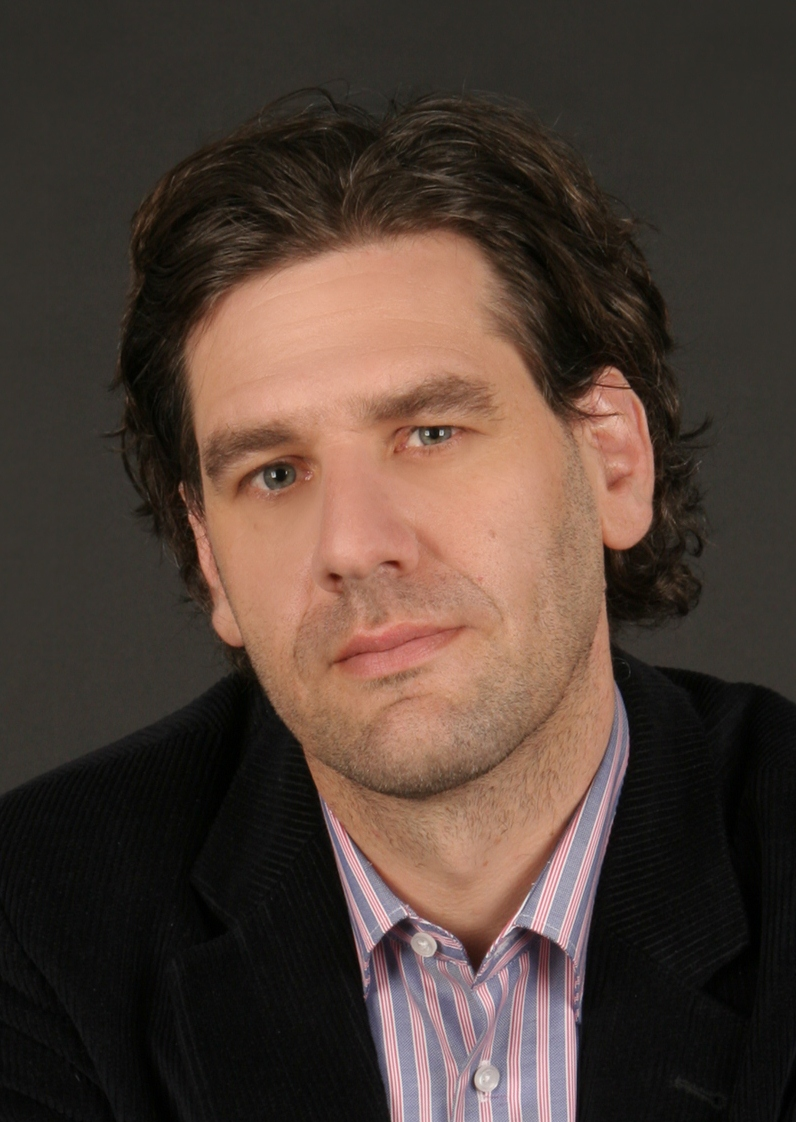
- Böhler, 2009
- Born: 1969 (age 56–57); Rheinfelden (Baden)
- Education: University of Cologne (PhD)
- Occupation: Historian
- Known for: World War II research

Jochen Böhler (born 1969 in Rheinfelden) is a German historian, specializing in the history of Eastern Europe in the 19th and 20th century, especially the World Wars, the Holocaust, nationality and borderland studies. He is the recipient of several international awards. and known to a larger audience due to frequent appearances in TV productions and articles in national newspapers such as, for example, Frankfurter Allgemeine Zeitung or DIE ZEIT. His main thesis on the beginning of WWII and the end of WWI in Eastern Europe has been discussed vividly in German, English, and Polish academic circles.

== Childhood ==
Böhler grew up in Switzerland, the Ruhr, Ghana, the Black Forest, and Trier at the trijunction of France, Luxembourg, and Germany.

== Professional career ==
Böhler obtained a Magister's degree at University of Cologne in 1999, where he specialized in modern and medieval history, as well as ethnology and political economy. His Magisterial thesis, Wehrmacht war crimes in Poland, won a departmental award. His PhD was finished at the same university in 2004. It was published simultaneously as paperback by the S. Fischer Verlag in its relevant 'black series' on the history of the Third Reich and by the state funded Federal Agency for Civic Education for educational purposes.

He is a member of the German Committee for the History of the Second World War and of the Working Group on Military History. From 2000 to 2010 he has worked in the German Historical Institute in Warsaw. Between 2003 and 2004 he was a Fellow in Residence at the United States Holocaust Memorial Museum in Washington. In 2017/2008, Böhler served as the Baron Friedrich Carl von Oppenheim Fellow at the International Institute for Holocaust Research at Yad Vashem.

Böhler also worked from 2006 to 2009 as a historical expert for the State Social Court of North Rhine-Westphalia on cases concerning the Ghetto Pension Act and was a co-signatory of the Historians' Appeal, which warned of "worrying misguided developments" with regard to the interpretation of the law by German pension funds. In 2008/2009 he was a consulting historian for the ARD production Der Überfall and in 2009/2010 he was a research assistant at the Independent Commission of Historians for the Investigation of the History of the Foreign Office during the National Socialist Era and in the Federal Republic of Germany as well as co-author of the corresponding research volume Das Amt und die Vergangenheit.

As research associate at the Imre Kertész Kolleg, Jochen Böhler headed (since 2010) the research area “War, Violence and Oppression”, and co-headed (with Robert Gerwarth, University College Dublin) the research project “The Waffen-SS: A European History”, which focused on the non-German ‘volunteers’ this paramilitary ‘Nazi elite formation’ recruited – often by force – in whole Europe from Spain to the Soviet Union and from Norway to Italy. An expert in Shoah and perpetrator studies, from 2010 onwards he extended his expertise to the First World War and its violent aftermath in Central and Eastern Europe. In Winter 2017/18, he taught these combined fields of knowledge as Invited Professor at the Chaire d’excellence, LabEx EHNE (“Writing a New History of Europe”), Research strand 5: The Europe of Wars and the Traces of War, at Sorbonne University, Paris. Several of his books have been translated into English and Polish, thus popularizing the violent history of Central Europe in the 20th century for a broader Western and Eastern European audience. From 2019 to 2022, Jochen Böhler was acting chair (chair holder: Prof. Joachim von Puttkamer) for Eastern European History at the Friedrich Schiller University Jena. From October 2022 o September 2023, he directed the Vienna Wiesenthal Institute for Holocaust Studies. Since May 2026, Böhler heads the Public History Department at the Museum of Military History in Vienna.

== Books and publications ==
- Böhler, Jochen (2020), (ed. with Ota Konrád and Rudolf Kučera) In the Shadow of the Great War. Physical Violence in East-Central Europe, 1917–1923. New York: Berghahn, ISBN 978-1-78920-939-6.
- Böhler, Jochen (2020), (ed. with Vivian Hux Reed) An American in Europe at War and Peace. Hugh S. Gibson’s Chronicles 1918–1919. Berlin, Boston: DeGruyter, ISBN 978-3-11-067213-8.
- Böhler, Jochen (2020), (ed. with Włodzimierz Borodziej and Joachim von Puttkamer) Dimensionen der Gewalt. Ostmitteleuropa zwischen Weltkrieg und Bürgerkrieg, 1918–1921. Berlin: Metropol, ISBN 978-3-86331-523-8.
- Böhler, Jochen (2018), Civil War in Central Europe: The Reconstruction of Poland, 1918-1921. Oxford: Oxford University Press, ISBN 978-0-19-879448-6.
- Böhler, Jochen (2018), (ed. with Vivian Hux Reed, M.B.B. Biskupski and Jan Roman Potocki) An American in Warsaw. Selected Writings of Hugh S. Gibson, U.S. Minister to Poland 1919-1924. Rochester, NY: University of Rochester Press, ISBN 9781580469296.
- Böhler, Jochen (2017), (ed. with Robert Gerwarth) The Waffen-SS. A European History Oxford, : Oxford University Press, ISBN 9781580469296.
- Böhler, Jochen (2013), (ed. with Stephan Lehnstaedt) Die Berichte der Einsatzgruppen aus Polen 1939: Vollständige Edition. Berlin: Metropol, ISBN 978-3863311384.
- Böhler, Jochen (2012), (ed. with Stephan Lehnstaedt) Gewalt und Alltag im besetzten Polen 1939–1945, Publications of the German Historical Institute Warsaw; 26. Osnabrück: Fibre, ISBN 978-3-938400-70-8.
- Böhler, Jochen (2010), (ed. with Jacek Andrzej Młynarczyk) Der Judenmord in den eingegliederten polnischen Gebieten 1939–1945, Osnabrück: Fibre, ISBN 978-3-938400-51-7.
- Böhler, Jochen (2009), Der Überfall. Deutschlands Krieg gegen Polen. Frankfurt: Eichborn, ISBN 3-821-85706-4.
- Böhler, Jochen (2008), (with Klaus-Michael Mallmann and Jürgen Matthäus) Einsatzgruppen in Polen. Darstellung und Dokumentation, Wissenschaftliche Buchgesellschaft, Darmstadt, ISBN 978-3-534-21353-5.
- Böhler, Jochen (2006), Auftakt zum Vernichtungskrieg. Die Wehrmacht in Polen 1939, Schriftenreihe der Bundeszentrale für politische Bildung, Bd. 550, Bonn, ISBN 3-89331-679-5 & Fischer TB, Frankfurt 2006, ISBN 3-596-16307-2.
- Böhler, Jochen (2005), "Größte Härte…" Verbrechen der Wehrmacht in Polen September–Oktober 1939. Ausstellungskatalog, Hamburg: Fibre, ISBN 3-938400-07-2.
