= Jürgen Matthäus =

German historian and writer (born 1959)

- Born: 1959 (age 66–67); Dortmund, West Germany
- Occupations: Historian, author, editor

Academic background
- Education: University of Bochum

Academic work
- Era: 20th century
- Institutions: United States Holocaust Memorial Museum
- Main interests: Modern European history, including the history of the Holocaust

Jürgen Matthäus (Note: German pronunciation: [ˈjʏʁɡən maˈtɛːʊs].) (born 1959) is a German historian and head of the research department of the United States Holocaust Memorial Museum. He is an author and editor of multiple works on the history of World War II and the Holocaust. Matthäus was a contributor to Christopher Browning's 2004 work The Origins of the Final Solution.

== Education and career ==
Matthäus studied history and philosophy at the University of Bochum where he earned his PhD in 1992. His first book on nation building in Australia before the First World War came out in 1993. Afterwards, he was senior historian at the Department of Justice and Regulation in Sydney, Australia. Since 1994, he has worked at the United States Holocaust Memorial Museum in Washington, D.C., where he currently serves as director of the research department at the Jack, Joseph and Morton Mandel Center for Advanced Holocaust Studies. He has held several guest professorships in the USA, Australia and Germany. He is a member of the international advisory board of the Topography of Terror Foundation (Berlin).

=== The Last Jew in Vinnytsia ===
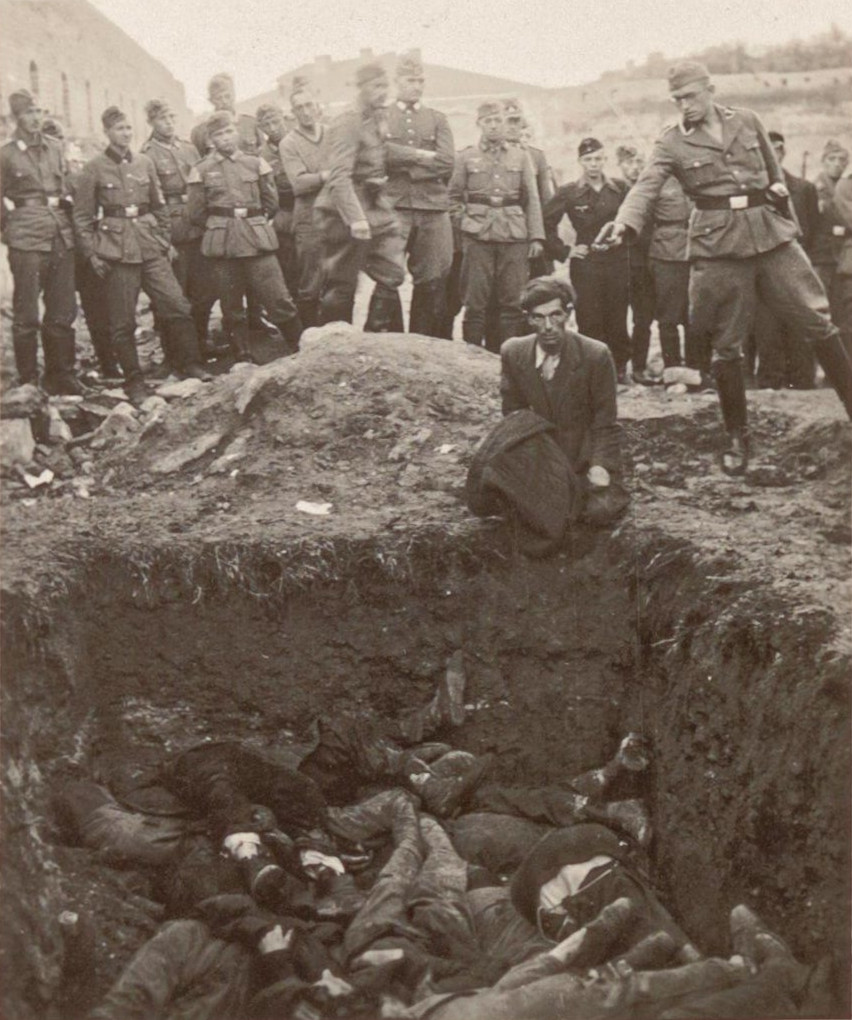
Alternate print of The Last Jew in Vinnytsia

Matthäus conducted an extended investigation into the Holocaust photograph long known as The Last Jew in Vinnitsa. In findings published in Zeitschrift für Geschichtswissenschaft, he established that the massacre was carried out by the SS on 28 July 1941 in the citadel of Berdychiv, and not in Vinnytsia. His research identified the shooter as Jakobus Onnen of Einsatzgruppe C, using archival material, contributions from Bellingcat volunteers, and AI-based image analysis of family photographs of Onnen. Matthäus described the match as unusually high and supported by extensive circumstantial evidence. He noted that the photograph was likely taken by a fellow soldier and that such images were kept as "trophies." In collaboration with the Ukrainian scholar Andrii Mahaletskyi, he was working to identify the victim in the image using Soviet-era community records.

== Selected works ==
=== In English ===
- "'The last Jew in Vinnitsa': Reframing an Iconic Holocaust Photograph". Holocaust and Genocide Studies. 37 (3): 349–359. December 22, 2023. doi:10.1093/hgs/dcad053.
- Christopher Browning, with contribution by Jürgen Matthäus: The Origins of the Final Solution: The Evolution of Nazi Jewish Policy, September 1939 – March 1942 Lincoln: University of Nebraska Press, 2004. ISBN 0-803-25979-4.
- Patricia Heberer; Jürgen Matthäus, eds. (2008). Atrocities on Trial: Historical Perspectives on the Politics of Prosecuting War Crimes. University of Nebraska Press. ISBN 978-0-8032-1084-4.
- Approaching an Auschwitz Survivor: Holocaust Testimony and its Transformations, Oxford University Press, Oxford; New York, NY 2009 (as editor of The Oxford Oral History series).
- Contemporary Responses to the Holocaust, Praeger/Greenwood, 2004, ISBN 0-275-97466-9. With Konrad Kwiet.
- Bajohr, Frank; Matthäus, Jürgen (2015). The political diary of Alfred Rosenberg and the onset of the Holocaust. Lanham, Maryland: Rowman & Littlefield. ISBN 9781442251687. OCLC 920465814.

=== In German ===
- Totenkopf und Zebrakleid: ein Berliner Jude in Auschwitz / Erwin R. Tichauer. Bearb. und mit einem Nachw. vers. von Jürgen Matthäus, Metropol, Berlin 2000 (gehört zu: Bibliothek der Erinnerung; Bd. 5)
- Ausbildungsziel Judenmord? : "Weltanschauliche Erziehung" von SS, Polizei und Waffen-SS im Rahmen der "Endlösung", Fischer-Taschenbuch-Verl., Frankfurt am Main 2003
- Deutsche, Juden, Völkermord: der Holocaust als Geschichte und Gegenwart, WBG, Darmstadt 2006 (Editor with Klaus-Michael Mallmann)
- Einsatzgruppen in Polen: Darstellung und Dokumentation, Wissenschaftliche Buchgesellschaft, Stuttgart 2008, ISBN 978-3-534-21353-5 (with Klaus-Michael Mallmann und Jochen Böhler)
- Die "Ereignismeldungen UdSSR" 1941. Dokumente der Einsatzgruppen in der Sowjetunion, Edited by Klaus-Michael Mallmann, Andrej Angrick, Jürgen Matthäus und Martin Cüppers. Wissenschaftliche Buchgesellschaft, Darmstadt 2011, ISBN 978-3-534-24468-3
- Naziverbrechen. Täter, Taten, Bewältigungsversuche, WBG Wissenschaftliche Buchgesellschaft, Darmstadt 2013 (Editor with Martin Cüppers und Andrej Angrick)
- Bajohr, Frank; Matthäus, Jürgen (2015). Alfred Rosenberg. Die Tagebücher von 1934 bis 1944. Frankfurt am Main: S. Fischer. ISBN 9783100023872. OCLC 908802181.
