= Stephan Lehnstaedt =

German historian

Stephan Lehnstaedt (1980, Munich) is a German historian of the Holocaust and professor at Touro University Berlin. Lehnstaedt received his doctoral title in 2008 from Ludwig-Maximilians-Universität München (LMU) and in 2016 a habilitation from Technical University Chemnitz. Before joining Touro, he lectured at LMU Munich, the Humboldt University of Berlin, and the London School of Economics.

He works on imperialism, the history of the two world wars, the Holocaust and its reparations, with a special focus on German-Polish issues. He has published eight monographs and more than 50 peer-reviewed articles in seven languages. The German Bundestag heard him several times as an expert on memorial culture and the Holocaust, and he is also an advisor to the government. In 2025, he was elected as member of the commission against antisemitism of the state parliament of Berlin. As a consequence, he is a frequent interview partner in German and Polish media. For his research on Polish history and his efforts on compensation for Holocaust victims, he received several awards in Poland.

In 2019, he has been working with the Berlin Wannsee Conference Memorial and the Wiener Holocaust Library London to curate the exhibition "Crimes Uncovered. The First Generation of Holocaust Researchers." It has been shown by the United Nations in New York, UNESCO headquarters in Paris, the UN's Palais des Nations in Geneva, the Haus der Geschichte in Vienna, and the German Foreign Office in Berlin, among others. His most recent exhibition was in 2022 with the German Military History Museum Berlin-Gatow, "The German Luftwaffe in the Third Reich. Crimes, Forced Labor, Resistance".

== Monographs ==
- Der vergessene Widerstand. Jüdinnen und Juden im Kampf gegen den Holocaust. C.H. Beck, München 2025, ISBN 978-3-406-83030-3.
- Der Warschauer Aufstand 1944. Reclam, Ditzingen 2024, ISBN 978-3150114834.
- Der Große Nordische Krieg 1700–1721. Reclam, Leipzig 2021, ISBN 978-3-15-011345-5.
- Der vergessene Sieg. Der Polnisch-Sowjetische Krieg 1919-1921 und die Entstehung des modernen Osteuropa. C.H. Beck, München 2019, ISBN 978-3-406-74022-0.
- Imperiale Polenpolitik in den Weltkriegen. Eine vergleichende Studie zu den Mittelmächten und zu NS-Deutschland. Fibre-Verlag, Osnabrück 2017, ISBN 978-3-944870-57-1.
- Der Kern des Holocaust. Bełżec, Sobibór, Treblinka und die Aktion Reinhardt. C.H. Beck, München 2017. 207 S. ISBN 978-3-406-70702-5.
  - Czas Zabijania. Bełżec, Sobibór, Treblinka i Akcja Reinhardt, Warszawa: Prószyński i S-ka 2018.
  - Le Cœur de la Shoah. Bełżec, Sobibór, Treblinka et l‘ Aktion Reinhardt, Bruxelles: ASBL Mémoire d‘ Auschwitz 2020.
  - De kern van de Holocaust. Belzec, Sobibor, Treblinka en Aktion Reinhardt, Hilversum: Uitgeverij Verbum 2021.
- Geschichte und Gesetzesauslegung. Zu Kontinuität und Wandel des bundesdeutschen Wiedergutmachungsdiskurses am Beispiel der Ghettorenten. fibre-Verlag, Osnabrück 2011, ISBN 978-3-938400-69-2.
- Okkupation im Osten. Besatzeralltag in Warschau und Minsk 1939-1944. Oldenbourg-Verlag, München 2010.
  - Occupation in the East. The daily lives of German occupiers in Warsaw and Minsk, 1939–1944. Berghahn Books, New York/Oxford 2016.
