= Włodzimierz Jastrzębski =

Polish historian (1939–2024)

- Born: September 3, 1939
- Died: January 26, 2024

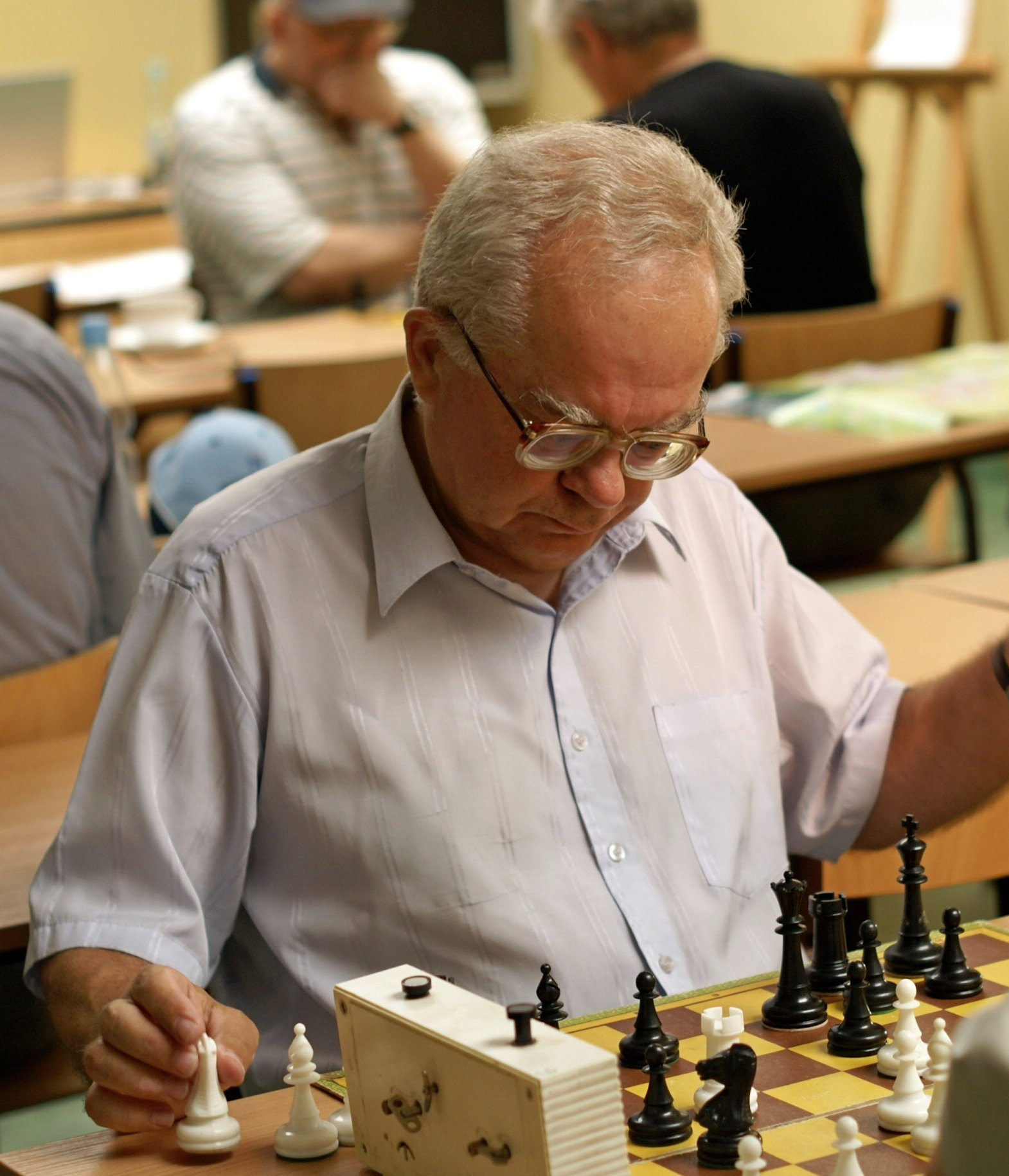
Jastrzębski in 2010

Włodzimierz Jastrzębski (3 September 1939 – 26 January 2024) was a Polish historian and a professor of Kazimierz Wielki University in Bydgoszcz, born in Siedlce. He specialized in Polish history during World War II. He studied Bloody Sunday, a sequence of events that took place in Bydgoszcz (German: Bromberg), a Polish city with a sizable German minority, between 3 and 4 September 1939, immediately after the German invasion of Poland, supporting the "traditional Polish POV" until later, when he cancelled his results.

Jastrzębski supervised seven doctoral students.

Jastrzębski died in Bydgoszcz on 26 January 2024, at the age of 84.
