= Klaus-Michael Mallmann =

German historian

Klaus-Michael Mallmann (born 3 November 1948, in Kaiserslautern) is a German historian at the University of Stuttgart.

== Scientific career ==
Mallmann studied history, Sociology, Politics and German studies at the Saarland University. In 1979 he was awarded the Kurt Magnus Prize after working as a television journalist for Saarländischer Rundfunk from 1976 to 1987. He obtained his doctorate in 1980, with a study of the "beginnings of the mine workers' movement on the Saar (1848 - 1904)". He was an academic assistant at the Saarland university from 1988 to 1992, in a research project titled "Resistance and refusal in Saarland 1935 - 1945". Afterwards he worked at the Free University of Berlin on the research project "The Gestapo 1933 - 1945" under Professor Dr. Peter Steinbach. He qualified as a university lecturer in 1995 at the University of Essen with the study "Milieu and Avant-garde. On the social history of German communism 1918 - 1933". He taught in Essen as lecturer for modern history. He transferred to the university of Stuttgart in 2001. Other research projects focused on the time of National Socialism, including "Order police, the War in the East and the murder of the Jews" as a postdoctoral researcher at the cultural studies institute of the academic centre in North Rhine-Westphalia, and a project at the University of Flensburg, "The perpetrators of the Shoah. Norms and behaviour in the process of the extermination of the Jews".

== Publications ==
=== Monographs ===
1. Kommunisten in der Weimarer Republik. Sozialgeschichte einer revolutionären Bewegung. Darmstadt 1996 (Wissenschaftliche Buchgesellschaft)

=== Editions ===
1. (with Gerhard Paul) Die Gestapo im Zweiten Weltkrieg. `Heimatfront` and besetztes Europa, Darmstadt 2000 (Wissenschaftliche Buchgesellschaft, 674 S.)
2. (with Volker Rieß and Wolfram Pyta) Deutscher Osten 1939-194# Der Weltschauungskrieg in Photos and Texten, Darmstadt 2003 (Wissenschaftliche Buchgesellschaft, 205 S.) (publication of the research unit Ludwigsburg of the Stuttgart University, Band 1)
3. (with Gerhard Paul) Karrieren der Gewalt. Nationalsozialistische Täterbiographien, Darmstadt 2004 (Wissenschaftliche Buchgesellschaft, 282 S.) (publication of the research unit Ludwigsburg of the Stuttgart University, Band 2)
4. (with Bogdan Musial) Genesis des Genozids. Polen 1939-194# Hrsg. im Auftrag des Deutschen Historischen Instituts Warschau and der research unit Ludwigsburg of the Stuttgart University, Darmstadt 2004 (Wissenschaftliche Buchgesellschaft, 240 S.) (publication of the research unit Ludwigsburg of the Stuttgart University, Band 3)
5. (with Martin Cüppers) Halbmond und Hakenkreuz. Das Dritte Reich, die Araber und Palästina, Darmstadt, 3rd edition 2011 (1st edition 2006), (Wissenschaftliche Buchgesellschaft, 288 S.)
6. Die Gestapo nach 1945: Karrieren, Konflikte, Konstruktionen; Darmstadt 2009 (Wissenschaftliche Buchgesellschaft)

=== Articles ===
1. Social Penetration and Police Action: Collaboration Structures in the Repertory of Gestapo Activities, in: International Review of Social History 42 (1997), p. 25-43
2. Frankreichs fremde Patrioten. Deutsche in der Résistance in: Jahrbuch Exilforschung 15 (1997) p. 33-65
3. Konsistenz oder Zusammenbruch? Profile des kommunistischen Widerstandes 1933 - 1945, in: Detlef Schmiechen-Ackermann (Hrsg.): Anpassung - Verweigerung - Widerstand. Soziale Milieus, politische Kultur and der Widerstand gegen den Nationalsozialismus in Deutschland im regionalen Vergleich, Berlin 1997, p. 221 - 237
4. Vom Fußvolk der "Endlösung". Ordnungspolizei, Ostkrieg and Judenmord, in: Tel Aviver Jahrbuch für deutsche Geschichte 26 (1997) p. 355 - 391
5. Denunziation, Kollaboration, Terror. Deutsche Gesellschaft and Geheime Staatspolizei im Nationalsozialismus, in: Sozialwissenschaftliche Informationen 27 (1998), p. 132 - 13# "Kommunisten" and "Deutschsprachige Emigranten im Spanischen Bürgerkrieg", in: Claus-Dieter Krohn/Patrik von zur Mühlen/Gerhard Paul/Lutz Winckler (Hrsg.): Handbuch der deutschsprachigen Emigration 1933 - 1945, Darmstadt 1989, Sp. 493 - 506, 608 - 621
6. Gehorsame Parteisoldaten oder eigensinnige Akteure? Die Weimarer Kommunisten in der Kontroverse - Eine Erwiderung, in: Vierteljahrshefte für Zeitgeschichte 47 (1999), p. 401 - 415
7. Der Einstieg in den Genozid. Das Lübecker Polizeibataillon 307 and das Massaker in Brest-Litowsk Anfang Juli 1941, in: Archiv für Polizeigeschichte 10 (1999), p. 82 - 88
8. Brüderlein & Co. Die Gestapo and der kommunistische Widerstand in der Kriegsendphase, in: Gerhard Paul/Klaus-Michael Mallmann (Hrsg.): Die Gestapo im Zweiten Weltkrieg. `Heimatfront` and besetztes Europa, Darmstadt 2000, p. 270 - 287
9. Menschenjagd and Massenmord. Das neue Instrument der Einsatzgruppen and - kommandos 1938–1945, ibid, p. 291-316
10. Die Türöffner der "Endlösung". Zur Genesis des Genozids, ibid, p. 437-463
11. "Aufgeräumt and abgebrannt". Sicherheitspolizei and `Bandenkampf` in der besetzten Sowjetunion, ibid, p. 503-520
12. Die Gestapo. Weltanschauungsexekutive mit gesellschaftlichem Rückhalt, ibid, p. 599-650 (gemeinsam mit Gerhard Paul)
13. Die unübersichtliche Konfrontation. Geheime Staatspolizei, Sicherheitsdienst and christliche Kirchen 1934-1939/40, in: Gerhard Besier (Hrsg.): Zwischen "nationaler Revolution" and militärischer Aggression. Transformationen in Kirche and Gesellschaft während der konsolidierten NS-Gewaltherrschaft 1934–1939, München 2001, p. 121-136
14. Der qualitative Sprung im Vernichtungsprozeß. Das Massaker von Kamenez-Podolsk Ende August 1941, in: Jahrbuch für Antisemitismusforschung 10 (2001), p. 239-264
15. Les Interbrigadistes allemands: un contingent national de volontaires pendant la guerre d´Espagne, in : Jean Batou/Ami-Jacques Rapin/Stéfanie Prezioso (Hrsg.) : Volontaires internationaux contre Franco. Engagés volontaires de cinq continents et politique de l`Union soviétique, Lausanne 2000 (Verlag Antipodes)
16. "Mensch, ich feiere heut´ meinen tausendsten Genickschuß". Die Sicherheitpolizei and die Shoah in Westgalizien, in: Gerhard Paul (Hrsg.): Die Täter der Shoah, Göttingen 2002
17. Der Krieg im Dunkeln. Das Unternehmen "Zeppelin" 1942–1945, in: Michael Wildt (Hrsg.): Die Rolle des SD im NS-Regime, Hamburg 2002 (Hamburger Edition)
18. (with Gerhard Paul) Sozialisation, Milieu and Gewalt. Fortschritte and Probleme der neueren Täterforschung, in: Klaus-Michael Mallmann/Gerhard Paul (Hrsg.): Karrieren der Gewalt. Nationalsozialistische Täterbiographien, Darmstadt 2004, p. 1-32
19. Heinrich Hamann - Leiter des Grenzpolizeikommissariats Neu-Sandez, in: ibid, p. 104-114
20. "... Mißgeburten, die nicht auf diese Welt gehören" Die deutsche Ordnungspolizei in Polen 1939–1941, in: Michael Mallmann/ Bogdan Musial (Hrsg.): Genesis des Genozidp. Polen 1939-194# Hrsg. im Auftrag des Deutschen Historischen Instituts Warschau and der research unit Ludwigsburg of the Stuttgart University, Darmstadt 2004, p. 71-89
21. "Mensch, ich feiere heut' den tausendsten Genickschuß". Die Sicherheitspolizei and die Shoah in Westgalizien, in: Bogdan Musial (Hrsg.): "Aktion Reinhardt". Der Völkermord an den Juden im Generalgouvernement 1941–1944, Osnabrück 2004, p. 353-379
