= Prisoners of war in World War II =

Prisoners of war during World War II faced vastly different fates due to the POW conventions adhered to or ignored, depending on the theater of conflict, and the behaviour of their captors. During the war approximately 35 million soldiers surrendered, with many held in the prisoner-of-war camps. Most of the POWs were taken in the European theatre of the war. Approximately 14%, or 5 million, died in captivity; out of these, 3 million fatalities were Soviets POWs, and one million, German POWs.

Early in World War II, Nazi Germany, overwhelmed by the number of POWs, released many, though some became used as forced labor. As the war progressed, POWs became strategic assets, increasingly used as forced labor, or considered an important leverage for reciprocal treatment. Within a few years of the war ending, most of POWs were repatriated, though notable exceptions persisted, with Axis POWs in Chinese and Soviet camps held into the 1950s.

The mortality rate was disproportionately high in the Eastern and Pacific theaters, where atrocities, forced labor, and starvation were common, especially for Soviet and Chinese captives under Axis powers and German POWs in Soviet hands. Axis POWs were treated very well by the Western Allies and very harshly by the USSR. Western Allied POWs generally experienced better conditions than most other belligerents, although their treatment by the Japanese was harsh.

Post-war trials, including the Nuremberg Trials, prosecuted violations of POW treatment, though public awareness of such crimes emerged much later, particularly in Germany, while in Japan and the USSR the issue is still mostly ignored. POWs of World War II were selectively depicted in popular culture, often romanticized in Western media through escape narratives like The Great Escape, while harsher realities, such as Soviet treatment of captives, or Axis treatment of non-Western captives, remain underrepresented.

== History ==
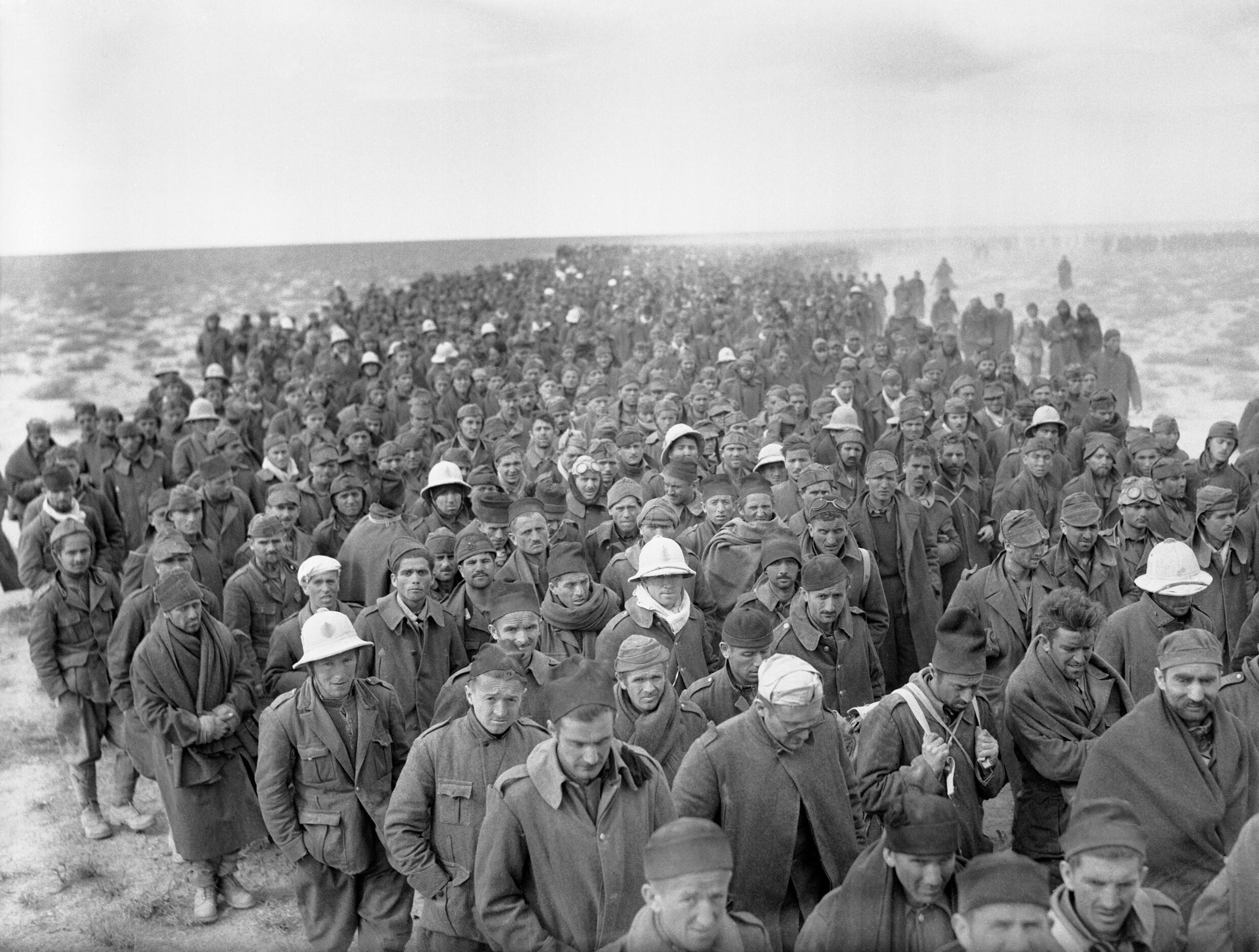
Italian soldiers taken prisoner by the Allies during Operation Compass (1941)

Most prisoners, after being captured, spent the war in the prisoner of war camps. In the early phases of the war, following German occupation of much of Europe, Germany also found itself unprepared for the number of POWs it held. As a result of that, as well as for political reasons, it released many (particularly enlisted personnel) on parole (as a result, it released all the Dutch, the Danes, all Flemish Belgian, all Greeks, nine-tenths of the Poles, and nearly a third of the French captives; some, however, like Poles, were almost immediately forcibly conscripted as laborers). Later prisoners became valuable and were kept as guarantee of good treatment of the prisoners' kept by the other side, or directly used for hard (forced) labor. A small number were exchanged in prisoner exchanges, primarily between Italy and Germany and the Western Allies (approximately 6,000 Italian, 14,000 German, and 12,400 Allied POWs were exchanged in such a fashion).

The majority of POWs were released by the late 1940s. In most places they were warmly received by the populace, major exceptions included France, where society "preferred to forget about them", and the USSR, where they suffered from much discrimination. The last POWs of World War II were Germans and Japanese released from the USSR camps in 1956; some Japanese were held in China until 1964. A few exceptions include stories such as András Toma, considered the last POW of World War II released from captivity, who was discovered living in a Russian psychiatric hospital in 2000 and was returned to Hungary some fifty-six years after his capture.

== Number of POWs ==
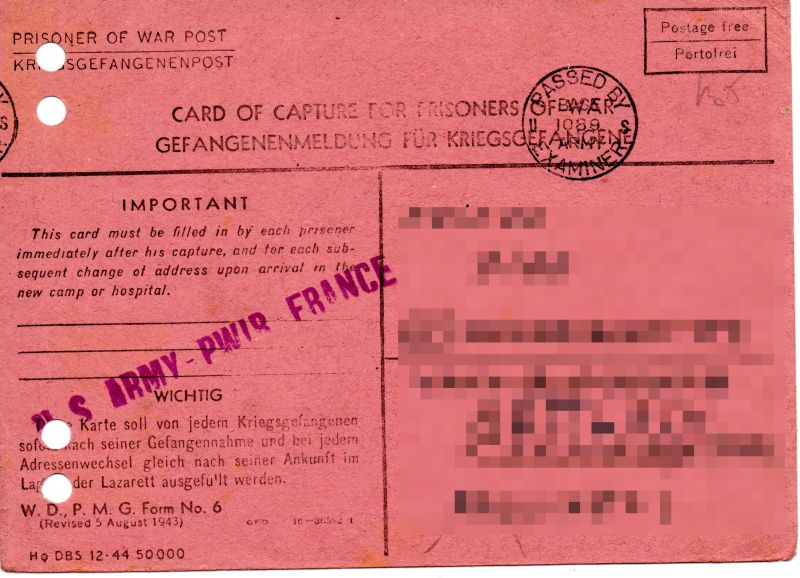
"Card of Capture for Prisoners of War", an American POW-related document

In mid-90s Simon MacKenzie observed that "Obtaining an exact figure for the number of POWs [in WWII] is made virtually impossible by the inexactness or unavailability of the records kept by many of the belligerents". In some cases, where entire countries surrendered (for example, Belgians), most if not all soldiers who were not killed in action were captured at some point during the fighting, but many were quickly released unofficially; while others were imprisoned for years. Different estimates may or may not count all such groups as POWs. Likewise, German and Japanese soldiers held after their countries surrendered at the end of the war often were not categorized as prisoners of war (see Japanese Surrendered Personnel, Disarmed Enemy Forces and Surrendered Enemy Personnel.).

MacKenzie cites the figure of 35 million following the 1960s estimate by German historian Kurt W. Böhme. That estimate, considered conservative by MacKenzie, has been repeated in more recent works (such as by Christian Gerlach in the mid-2010s). Bob Moore, who in his monograph focused on the European theater, gave an estimate of "more than 20 million", which he considered inflated with the number of Axis troops that surrendered after the war.

Consequently, the estimates of the number of prisoners by country or origin or capture can vary as well. With regards to nationality, some estimates include:

By country of origin:

- American POWs taken in all theaters: 103,918 (2% of total). Out of that, 95,532 were held by Germans and 21,580-26,943 by Japanese.
- British and the British Commonwealth POWs taken in all theatres: 353,941 (9% of total); including at least 15,000 Indian soldiers from the British Indian Army in German and Italian hands. Out of that total number, 142,319-169,000 were captured by Germany and Italy. In mid-1943 Italians held 70,000 British troops (about 40,000 British and the rest from the Commonwealth territories). Japanese held 21,000- 21,726 Australian, 50,016 British, 1,691 Canadian, at least 60,000 Indian and 121 New Zealand prisoners.
- Belgians: the majority of the Belgian army, numbering between 600,000-650,000, was captured by the Germans; 225,000 were sent to POW camps while the rest were released. Within a year, 108,000 Flemish Belgians were released as well.^{a}
- Chinese POWs: Tens of thousands of Chinese soldiers were captured by the Japanese every year of the Second Sino-Japanese War (1937–1945); total estimates of POWs vary but a range of at least 750,000 to over a million has been suggested by scholars.
- Danish POWs: while the Germans quickly captured the Danish army following the German invasion of Denmark, the Danes were quickly released^{a}. In 1943 about 10,000 Danish soldiers were arrested again and imprisoned in Germany, but most were again released quickly.
- Dutch POWs: while the Germans quickly captured the Dutch army (c. 300,000 soldiers) following the German invasion of the Netherlands, the Danes were quickly released^{a}. However, over 10,000 were taken into custody later in several German actions. A small number of soldiers from Free Dutch Forces were also subject to becoming POWs in Germany upon capture at various stages of the war. 37,000 from the forces of the Dutch colonial empire were held by Japanese.
- Filipino POWs: held by Japanese: at least 62,000
- Finnish POWs: held by the USSR: 900 during the Winter War; 2,377-3,500 during the Continuation War
- French POWs: held by Germany: estimates vary from 1,500,000, 1,800,000 to 1,900,000 following the fall of France, including about 100,000 colonial auxiliaries. 15,000 (12,000 French and 3,000 colonial auxiliaries) were briefly held by the Japanese following the Japanese coup d'état in French Indochina in March 1945.
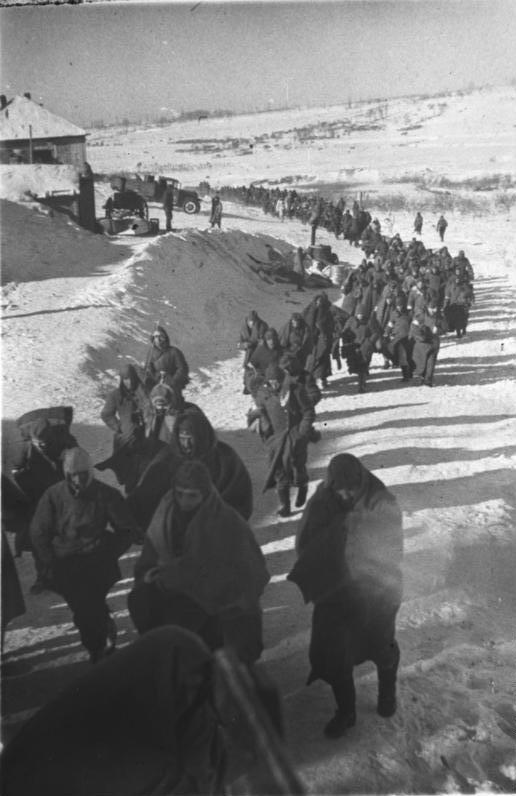
  German prisoners of war after the Battle of Stalingrad (February 1943)
- German POWs: held by the USA: 11,000,000 total (with 1,600,000 captured by the Americans, and 2,400,000 by the British). 425,000 in the USA territory; more than 400,000 in British and Commonwealth territory; 2.8 million held by Western custody by April 30, 1945 (and close to 7 million in the months after the war); approximately 3,000,000 held by the USSR. Small numbers were briefly held in France until the fall of France. 5,000 were transferred to the custody of Free French in 1943, effectively as hostages to prevent Axis executions of Free French and French Resistance members; that number grew significantly to over 200,000 in as the war progressed.
- Greek POWs: Following the capitulation of Greece, the whole Greek Army, numbering around 430,000 men, was declared to be prisoners of war, however almost all were almost immediately released. Some Greeks joined the Allies-affiliated Greek Armed Forces in the Middle East; an estimated 2,000 were subsequently captured and treated as British auxiliaries.
- Hungarian POWs: around 500,000 were held by the USSR
- Italian POWs: estimate of Italian POWs before the Italian surrender: 700,000. Out of these: held by USSR: 65,000. 154,000 were held in Britain and 400,000 were held by Britain in various locations by the time war ended. A small number initially, then over 50,000 later, were sent to the United States; others in various parts of the Commonwealth (such as India, Australia, South Africa and Kenya). Close to 20,000 if not more were captured by Greeks during the Greek-Italian War in 1940. 15,000 were transferred to the custody of Free French in 1943; that number later increased to over 35,000. An estimate for the number of new Italian POWs following the surrender was at 1,300,000; most - approximately one million - were interned by the Germans following Italian surrender; They were not recognized as POWs by the Germans. A small number were interned by the Japanese. An estimate of one million Italian POWs still held by various captors by the time war ended in 1945 has also been given. Early in the war British also captured "many thousands" of Italian colonial troops; who were quickly released after being assessed as having little military value.
- Japanese POWs: 35,000-50,000 held by the Western Allies; 900,000 were captured by the Soviets. 560,000 to 760,000 were held by the USSR after Japan surrendered.
- Norwegian POWs: while the Germans quickly captured the Norwegian army following the German invasion of Norway, the Norwegians were quickly released.^{a} About 1,500 were arrested in 1943; about 1,000 were held until the end of the war. Small number of Norwegians fighting for the Allies in exile were occasionally captured as well throughout the war.
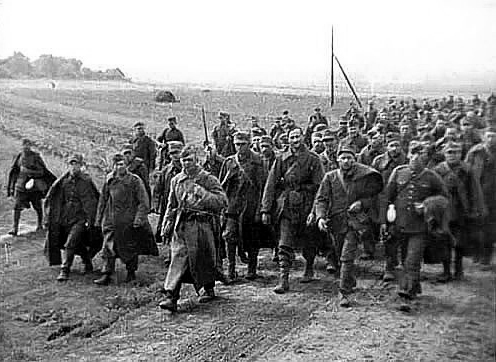
  Polish prisoners of war captured by the Red Army after the Soviet invasion of Poland (1939)
- Polish POWs: all POWs after invasion of Poland: estimates range 650,000-1,039,800 with the lower estimates based on number of soldiers held at POW camps and the higher, for all soldiers as well as similar groups (ex. policeman) taken into custody (many were quickly released). Out of these: 420,000-694,000 held by Germany (many were quickly released then forced to become forced laborers), and 125,000, 190,000 or 452 500 held by the USSR following the Soviet invasion of Poland. More Polish soldiers would be captured later in the war as Poland created several armies in exile; for example, 60,000 were captured after fall of France. 15,000 Polish partisans taken into custody after the Warsaw Uprising were recognized as prisoners of war and deported to POW camps.
- Romanian POWs held by USSR: between 100,000 to 250,000
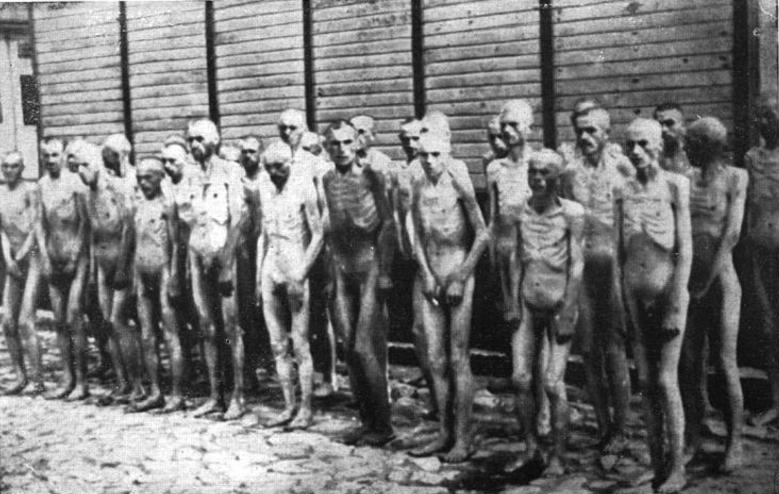
  Starving, emaciated Soviet prisoners of war in front of a barrack in the Mauthausen concentration camp in Austria
- Soviet POWs: held by Finland: 64,000; held by Germany: 5,700,000-6,200,000; held by Romania: 91,000 A small number (few dozens) were held by the Japanese following the 1939 border clashes Khalkhin Gol (at that point, however, USSR was not a participant of World War II).
- Yugoslav POWs: approximately half of the Yugoslav Army was captured by the Germans, resulting in about 350,000 Yugoslav POWs shortly after the German invasion of Yugoslavia; however about half of them were nearly instantly released (however, most were forced to become laborers shortly afterward). Shortly afterward, Germans released more prisoners, retaining only the Serbs (about 130,000). Due to the infighting in Yugoslavia, over 100,000 partisans opposed to the victorious, communist aligned groups were taken into custody by their opponents near the end of the war.

By country of capture:

- number of POWs held by the British and Commonwealth: 400,000 Germans (mostly in Canada until the Normandy landings; that number was also given for the number of Germans "held in Britain; some of these POWs were also transferred to the American custody). Over 200,000 Germans were held in the UK by the time the war ended in May 1945; a year later that number peaked at 400,000. Another estimate for the German POWs immediately after the war ended was 2,400,000 Germans in British custody. 400,000 Italians (at least 154,000 held in Britain or Commonwealth territories such as India, Australia, South Africa and Kenya), as well as small number of Japanese troops (35,000-50,000 held by the Western Allies). The Germans in British hands included 1,200 soldiers captured by the Dutch in 1940 and evacuated to Britain before the Germans overrun the Dutch.
- number of POWs held by Germans: 11,000,000 (out of that, roughly 6,000,000 Soviet and 5,000,000 were non-Soviet)
- by mid-1943 Italians held 80,000 Allied troops (about 42,000 British and 26,000 from the British Commonwealth)
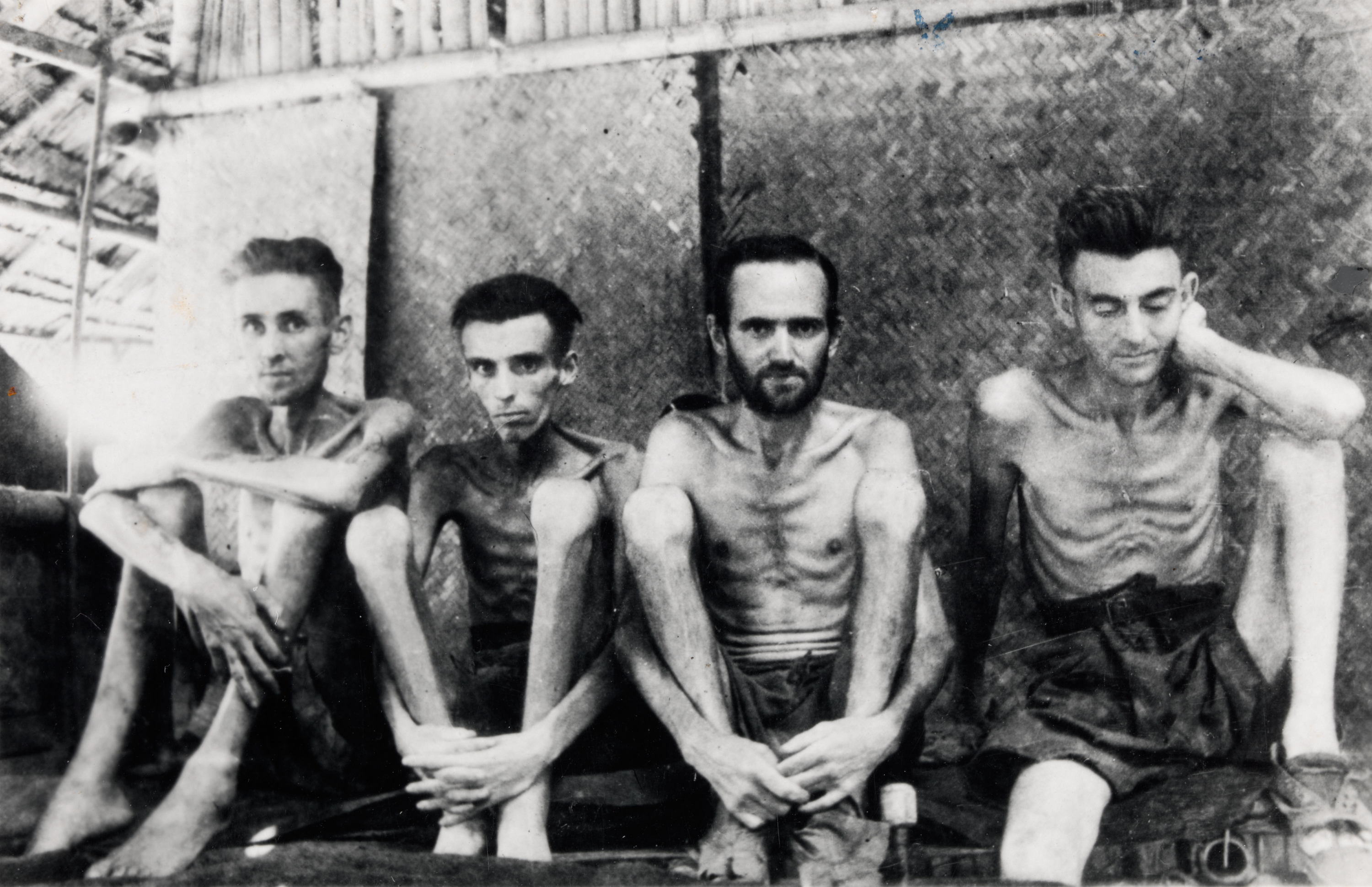
  Australian and Dutch soldiers in Japanese captivity (Tarsau, Thailand 1943)
- number of POWs held by Japanese: 320,000 to 350,000. Approximately 132,000 of them came from the Western Allied nations (British Commonwealth, Netherlands and the USA).
- number of POWs held by the United States: 425,000 Germans (in the US territory), and by the time the war ended, 1,600,000 as well as small number of Italian and Japanese troops (35,000-50,000 held by the Western Allies)
- number of POWs held by the USSR: approximately 3,000,000 Germans, 65,000 Italians, 100,000-250,000 Romanians as well as 560,000 to 760,000 Japanese (taken into custody after Japan surrendered)

== Laws of war ==
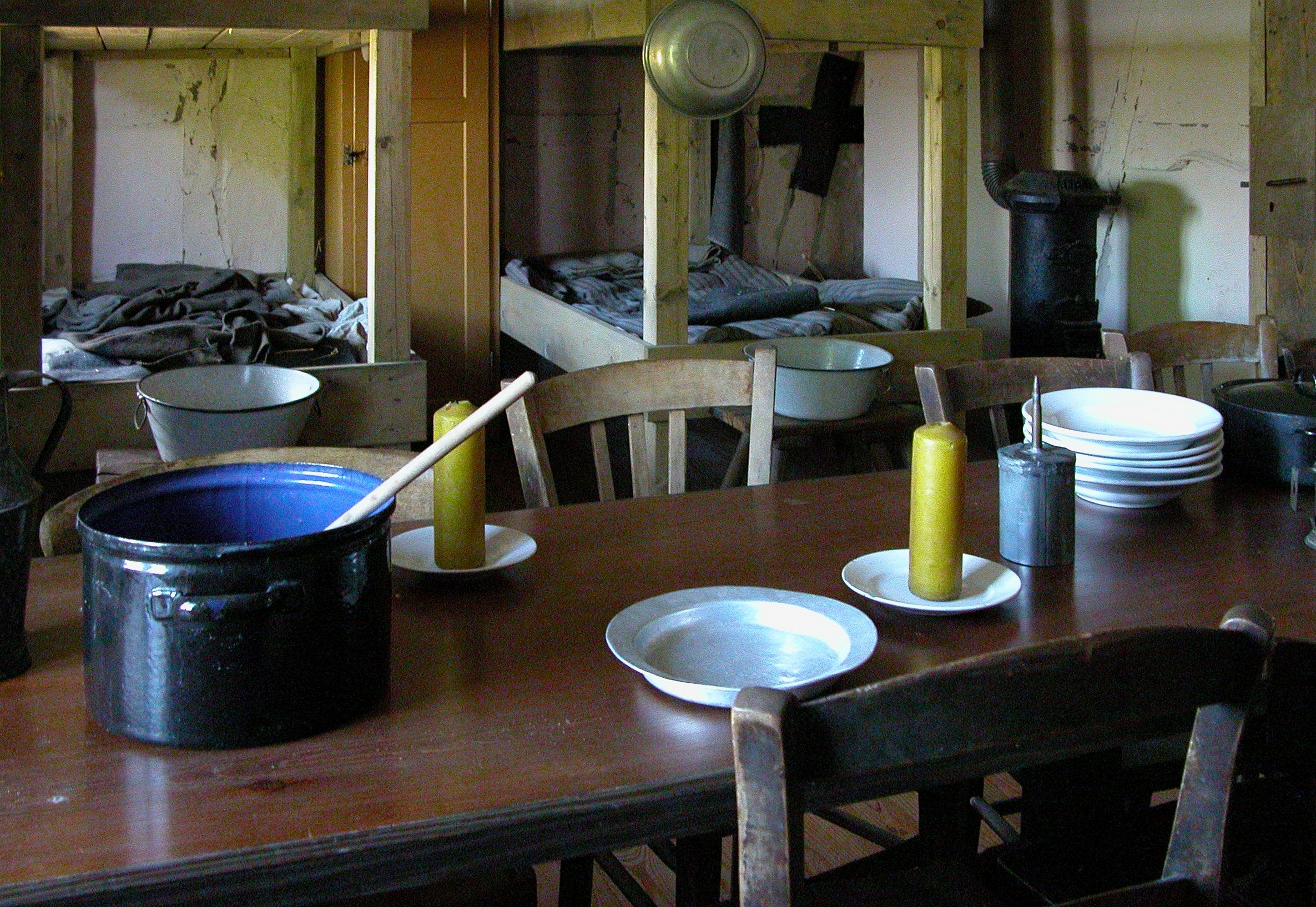
Dormitory for French prisoners of war, reconstruction in a German museum (Freilichtmuseum Roscheider Hof)

While most major combatants signed the 1907 Hague Convention and the 1929 Geneva Convention on Prisoners of War, the Axis powers, as well as the USSR, ignored their provisions to a greater or lesser degree. (The USSR did not sign the Geneva Convention while Japan signed, but did not ratify it).

== Treatment ==
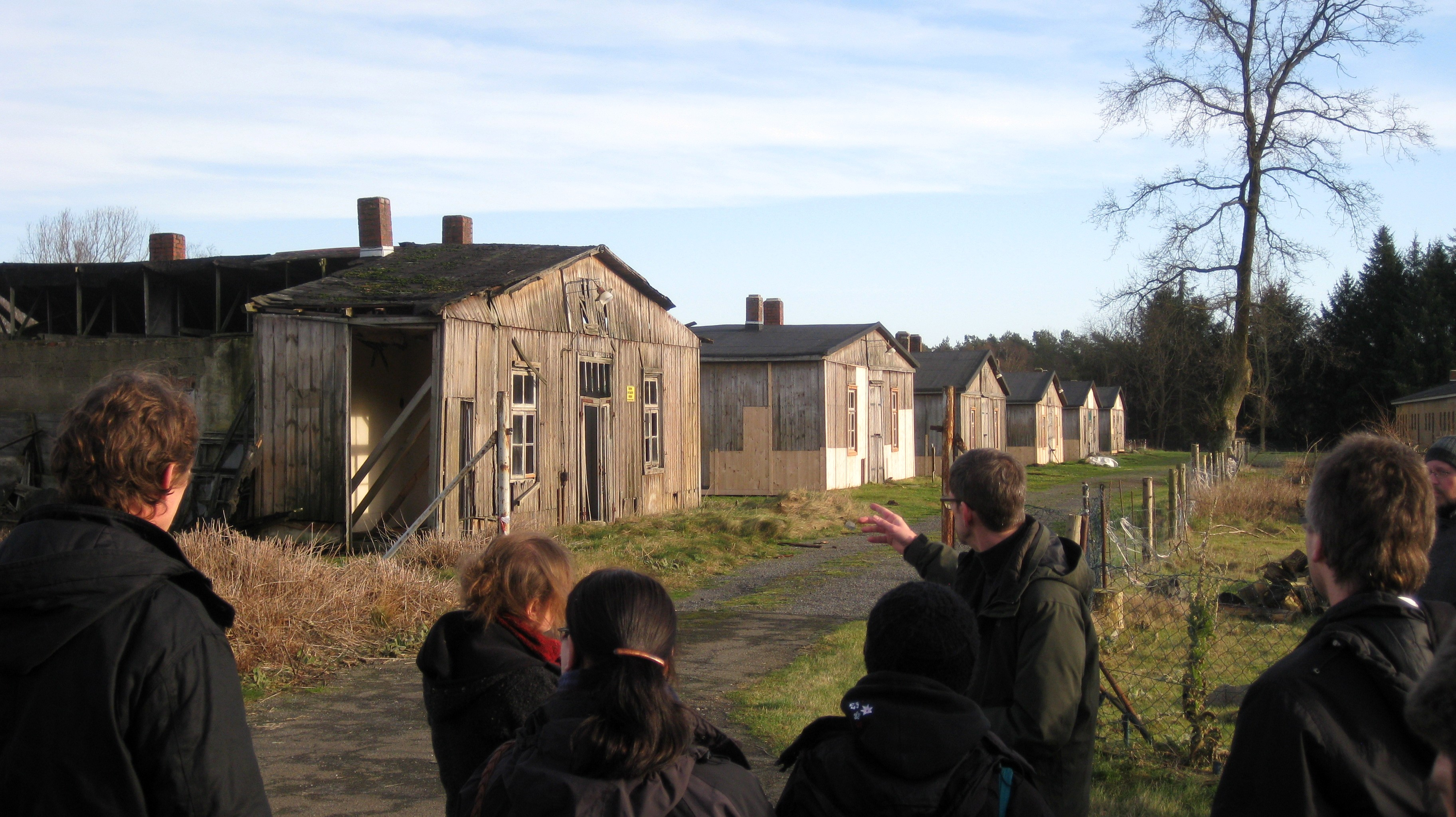
Barracks of the former Stalag X-B

Treatment of POWs varied significantly based on time and place. Some were released - or killed - almost immediately after capture. Many ended up in prisoner-of-war camps. POWs on both sides were subject to significant propaganda; including attempts to enlist some POWs into fighting for the other side.

Support from Red Cross was important in improving camp conditions and supplementing often inadequate rations and other necessities for the prisoners, particularly in the camps run by the Axis.

Treatment of a wounded British prisoner of war in an Italian field hospital during the spring of 1942

Mistreatment of POWs is considered one the most infamous war crimes of the Second World War".

== Mortality rate and atrocities ==
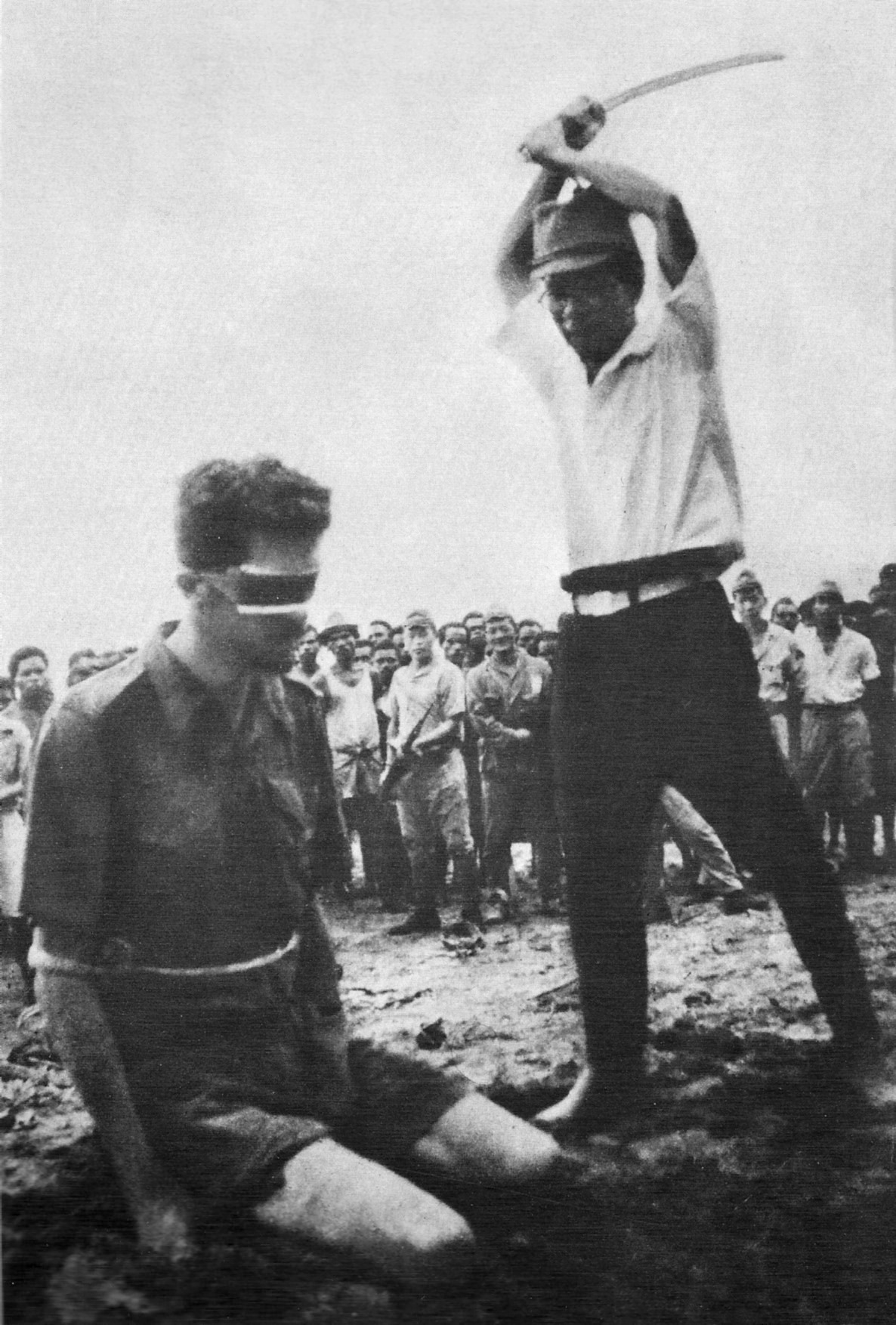
Australian Leonard Siffleet, captured by Japanese in New Guinea, is photographed seconds before his execution by beheading (24 October 1943).

The death rate of prisoners of war in World War II was higher than that of prisoners of war in World War I. Christian Gerlach explained this due to "much higher prisoner numbers, more supply problems, politically motivated denial of food, hard labor and direct violence", including racism.

The situation of POWs was easiest in the Western Front, and much worse on the Eastern Front and in the Asian and Pacific theater. On the Western Front, both sides (in particular, major belligerents – Germany, Italy and the Western Allies) generally treated one another according to the Geneva Convention, while the Convention was mostly ignored in the Eastern Front. In the Asian and Pacific theater, the Allies respected the Convention and treated Japanese prisoners humanely, which was not reciprocated by the Japanese.

Approximately 14% (~5 million, not counting Chinese POWs) died in captivity. Soviet POWs in Germany (approximately 3 million fatalities) and Axis and German POWs in the Soviet Union (non-Soviet estimates^b suggest a million to 1.2 million fatalities, or one and a half million total if accounting for all Axis POWs in the USSR) were among the most numerous victims. Mortality rate among Italian POWs in the USSR was even higher than that of the German. There were also instances of mistreatment by Western Allies, although on a much smaller scale. Among the Allies, after the USSR, the French had the worst record of treating the POWs. Germany treated Western Allied POWs much better than those from the Eastern Front (in particular, Soviets). The Asian and Pacific Fronts saw difficult POW situations as well, as Japan's treatment of POWs – Western, Chinese, Indian, Filipino and others – was very harsh. Non-Western POWs in Japanese captivity had higher fatalities rates; in particular, fatality rate for Chinese POWs is estimated at at least 40% and likely much higher. Canadian POW camps have been recognized as among the most comfortable in the entire war.

The situation of Jews, who served in various armies, was particularly difficult because of The Holocaust. However, while Jews were mistreated by the Germans more than non-Jews, their fates were generally tied to the nations and armies they belonged to. Non-officer Jews released into general populace often perished together with the civilians; however most Jews who served in the armies of the Western Allies, as well as the Jewish officers in the Polish Army, suffered only minor discrimination.

Comparative POW Mortality Rates
Rank	Mortality rate (highest estimate)	Prisoner group and captor(s)	Mortality range rates, context and sources
1	80%	Chinese POWs under Japan	R. J. Rummel noted that the literature on the subject estimates the number of Chinese POWs at half a million, and their fatalities as ranging from 267,000 to as many as a million; proposing a middle-range estimate of 400,000 dead (with, therefore, the lowest possible estimatef or the death rate of POWs being at ~80% for the half a million prisoners, substantially less if the number of prisoners is revised upward). The estimates for Chinese fatalities are very wide. Gruhl provided an estimate of 267,000 slain out of 750,000 captured (35.6%).
2	79%	Italian POWs under the Soviet Union	79% is a 2009 estimate by Thomas Schlemmer. A few years later, Maria Teresa Giusti provided numbers of 38,000 fatalities out of 64,500 for Italian soldiers, from capture until 1956, which would suggest a lower estimate of 59%. The official Soviet estimate was slightly lower at 56.5%.
3	57%	Soviet POWs under Nazi Germany	Death rate for 3.3–3.7 million out of 5.7 million Red Army prisoners; policies often amounted to extermination.
4	54.7%	Romanian POWs under the Soviet Union	Rummel provides an estimate of 230,000 dead out of 420,000 total (which translates to 54.7% mortality rate). Moore provides a much lower estimate of 29%.
5	43.3%	Filipino POWs under Japan	The number of Filipino POWs in Japanese custody has been estimated as at least 60,000. According to John C. McManus, as many as 26,000 died in the Camp O'Donnell, a Japanese POW camp in the Philippines.
6	40%	American POWs under Japan	Estimate provided by the U.S. Department of Veterans Affairs. This is a higher-end estimate; a more conservative estimate used by the Tokyo Tribunal has been suggested at 33% (approximately 7,000 out of 21,000).
7	40%	Polish POWs under Soviet Union	Polish soldiers were taken prisoners by the Soviet Union following its co-invasion of Poland in 1939 alongside Germany (see Soviet invasion of Poland). Tuszynski and Delda provide an estimate of 20-40% (approximately 82,000 fatalities).
8	37.5%	German POWs under the Soviet Union	Calculated rate: 1,185,000 deaths out of 3,155,000 POWs. A slightly lower estimate of 35.8% was proposed by Niall Ferguson. A much lower estimate has been suggested by Edele (15%). Soviet sources list the deaths of 381,000 of the 3,350,000 German Armed Forces taken prisoner in the war (11.3%)
9	36%	Australian POWs under Japan	Australian figures: 8,031 dead out of 22,376. Tokyo Tribunal provided a slightly lower estimate at 34.1%.
10	33%	Japanese POWs under the Soviet Union	Estimates vary: 200,000-300,000 out of 900,000 (22%-33.3%)or 90,000 deaths out of 650,000 (13.8%)
11	30%	Soviet POWs under Finland	22,000 deaths out of 67,000
12	29%	Western Allied POWs under Japan (aggregate)	Aggregate mortality: 41,600 deaths out of 145,200 (≈27–29%).
13	25%	New Zealand POWs under Japan	Tokyo Tribunal figure: 30 dead out of 120
14	24.8%	British POWs under Japan	Tokyo Tribunal figure: 12,433 dead out of 50,016.
15	22.9%	Netherlands POWs under Japan	Tokyo Tribunal figure: approximately 8,500 out of 37,000
16	16.1%	Canadian POWs under Japan	Tokyo Tribunal figure. approximately 270 out of 1,700
17	10.6%	Hungarian POWs under the Soviet Union	Moore provides an estimate of 10.6% as well as of c. 500,000 total Hungarian POWs in the Soviet Unioin, which suggests a number of fatalities in the range of 55,000.
18	8.3%	Indian POWs under Japan	Out of 60,000 Indian POWs captured early in the war, 5,000 died due to poor conditions in Japanese camps.
19	7.5%	Italian soldiers under German captivity (aggregate)	Estimate of 7.5% is based on numbers provided by Niven and Paver (45,000 deaths out of 600,000 captured Italian soldiers taken prisoner by the German army after Italy’s unconditional surrender on 8 September 1943_. Gerlach estimated a range of 6%-7%
20	5.5%	British Army POWs under Germany	This estimate is for the Army only and includes those killed while attempting escape; other branches had mortality rate at 2% or less. Lower estimate for all British POWs has been presented by Gerlach, at 1%.
21	5%	American POWs under Germany	General mortality rate. A lower estimate has been presented by Gerlach, at 1%.
22	4%	Western Allied POWs under Germany and Italy (aggregate)	Overall death rate for POWs from the U.S., U.K., Netherlands, Australia, Canada and New Zealand.
23	3.5%	British/Commonwealth POWs under Germany	General mortality rate.
24	6%	Yugoslav POWs under Germany	Gerlach estimated a range of 3%-6%
25	4%	Polish POWs under Germany	Gerlach estimated a range of 2%-4%
26	3%	Dutch POWs under Germany	Gerlach estimated a range of 2%-3%
27	2.8%	French POWs under Germany	Gerlach estimated a range of 1%-2.8%
28	2.5%	Belgian POWs under Germany	Gerlach estimated a range of 2%-2.5%

== Aftermath ==
Experience of mass captivity is one of central narratives of World War II, as it was a major formative, psychological experience for millions of soldiers affected by it, as well as their relatives. After the war, majority of POWs were repatriated, received starkly different treatment in various countries. In some, they were celebrated as returning heroes or honored as victims; in others, they were ignored or subject to discrimination.

=== Trials ===
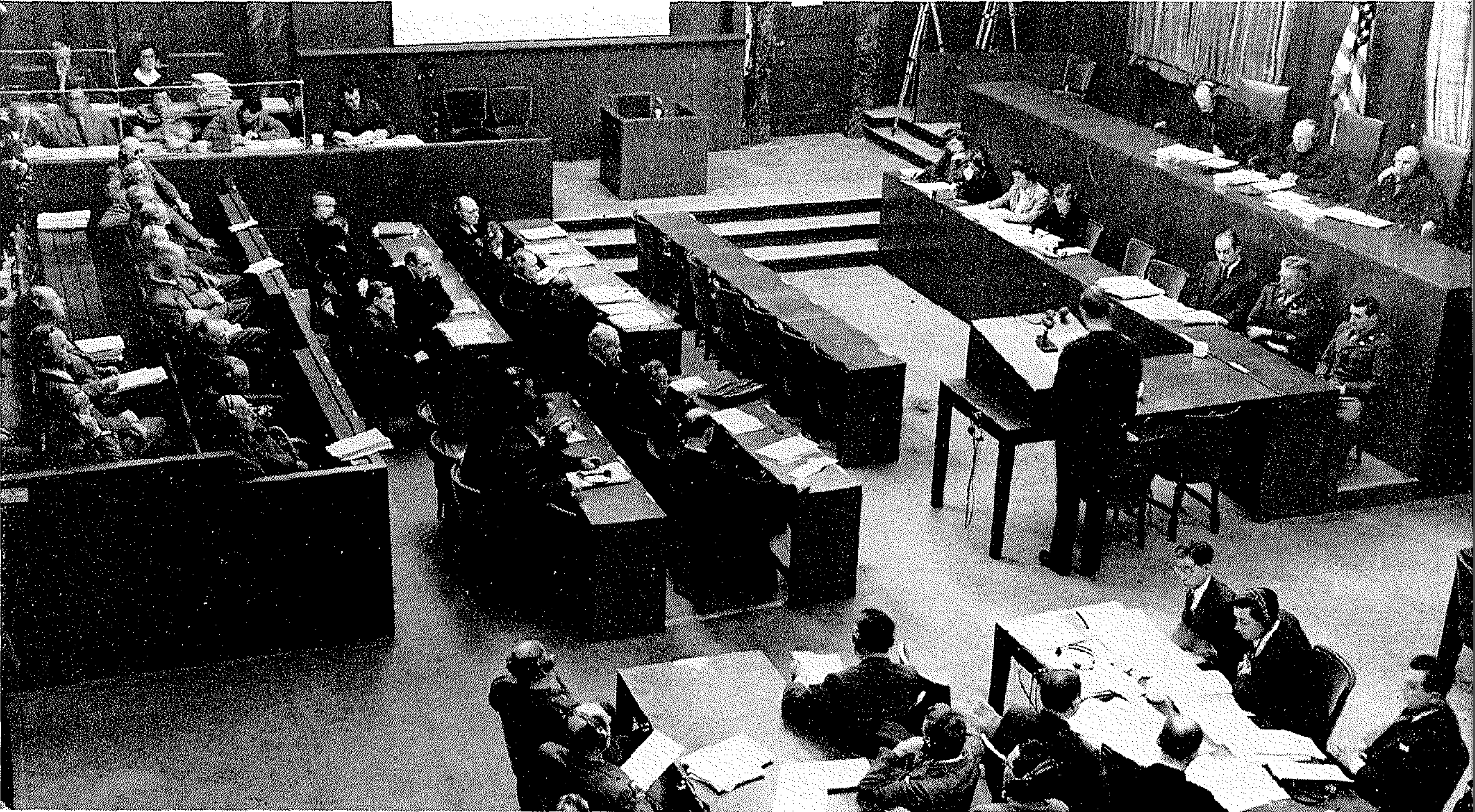
High Command Trial courtroom

First trials of Germans accused of crimes against prisoners of war took place in the Soviet Union while the war was ongoing. Shortly after World War II, at the Nuremberg trials (in particular, during the High Command Trial), numerous German crimes against prisoners of war were found to be a direct breach of the laws of war (in particular, Geneva and Hague conventions). Almost all of the German high commanders tried during that trial were found to be guilty of crimes against POWs.

Despite the trial, German public's awareness of the war crimes committed by its regular army (Wehrmacht), did not arise until the late 90s (see myth of the clean Wehrmacht). Japanese soldiers guilty of crimes against POWs were also tried (for example, in the International Military Tribunal for the Far East and Yokohama War Crimes Trials). The awareness of Japanese crimes against POWs is still poor in Japan; the topic mostly ignored or glossed over in that country.

=== Compensation ===
In the war aftermath, war reparations in form of compensation (indemnities) for Allied POWs were stipulated in peace agreements and paid out by the Axis countries. This was done in the context of Axis states illegal (from the international law perspective) use of POWs as forced laborers. However, the payments were delayed for years or even decades due to issues related to drawing up the lists of claimants and the collection of the funds; some claims of insufficient compensation were discussed in courts as late as in the 1990s, particularly in relation to POWs in custody of Japan. Soviet POWs and these from countries under Soviet sphere of influence were also denied much compensation, partially due to failures of negotiations in the Cold War context.

=== In popular culture ===
Images of WWII POWs in popular culture remain highly selective, obscured by the story of victory for the Allies (in which those taken prisoner played little role or were even considered traitors, like in the USSR), and driven by Cold War narratives.

Stories of WWII POWs were popularized by media such as films The Wooden Horse (1950), Albert RN (1953), The Colditz Story (1955), Reach for the Sky (1956) and "perhaps most famously" (according to Moore) The Great Escape (1963). Those movies also popularized the concept of prisoner-of-war escapes, creating a misleading impression that this was a relatively common occurrence.

The harsh treatment of Allied POWs by Japan became infamous in the West and remains widely known; it is however still mostly ignored or glossed over in Japan. Similarly, as noted by Mark Edele, in the Soviet Union, "Any claim that the glorious Red Army might have committed war crimes was dismissed as slanderous enemy propaganda". Denial that such crimes occurred is still not uncommon in modern Russia, where the issue has remained politically controversial, and research on this topic in Russia is difficult.

== Historiography ==
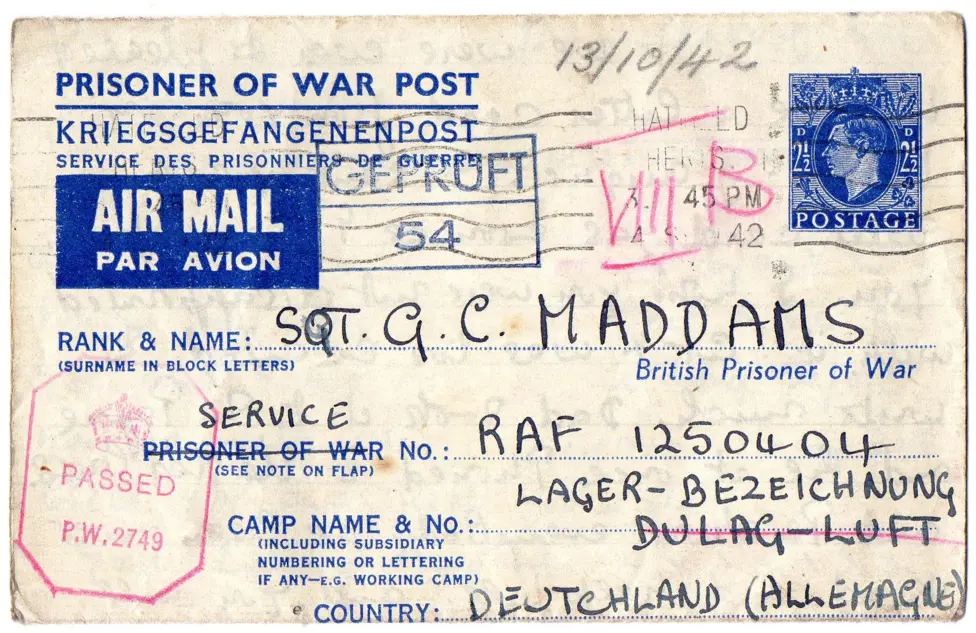
Air mail letter cover provided in the United Kingdom for families of PoWs held in Germany to write to them

As of 2007, the topic was described as under researched in modern historiography, although there are exceptions. For example, in West Germany, the government established The Scientific Commission for the History of German Prisoners of War (often referred to as the Maschke Commission, after its chairman, Erich Maschke), which produced a large body of research on this topic, by 1972 collected in 22 volumes.

== By country and region ==
=== All regions ===
- American prisoners of war in World War II
- British and British Commonwealth prisoners of war in World War II
  - British prisoners of war in World War II
- German prisoners of war in World War II
  - Heimkehrer

=== Western Front ===
- Belgian prisoners of war in World War II
- Danish prisoners of war in World War II
- Dutch prisoners of war in World War II
- German prisoners of war in the United Kingdom
- German prisoners of war in the United States
- German prisoners of war in northwest Europe
- French prisoners of war in World War II
- Italian prisoners of war in World War II
  - Italian prisoners of war in Germany
  - Italian prisoners of war in Australia
- Norwegian prisoners of war in World War II

=== Eastern Front ===
- German atrocities committed against Soviet prisoners of war
- Finnish prisoners of war in the Soviet Union
- German prisoners of war in the Soviet Union
- Italian prisoners of war in the Soviet Union
- Polish prisoners of war in World War II
- Romanian prisoners of war in the Soviet Union
- Soviet prisoners of war in Finland

=== Asian and Pacific Front ===
- Allied prisoners of war in Japan
- Far East prisoners of war
- Hell ship
- Japanese prisoners of war in World War II
  - Japanese prisoners of war in the Soviet Union

== See also ==
- Prisoners of war in World War I

== Notes ==
^a The comparatively lenient treatment by Germans of POWs from Scandinavia and Low Countries (most of whom were quickly released) was related to Nazi ideological and racial views.
^b Soviet estimates give the number as about 381,000.
