= Tadeusz Wojciechowski (economist) =

Polish economist and Warsaw Uprising fighter (1925–2026)

- Born: 25 July 1925; Warsaw, Poland
- Died: 18 November 2026 (aged 101); Marki, Masovian Voivodeship, Poland
- Other names: Olek, Globus (wartime codenames)
- Education: Doctor of Economics
- Occupations: Economist; Activist
- Known for: Fighting in and surviving the Warsaw Uprising
- Parents: Aleksander Wojciechowski (father); Irena Spalińska (mother)

Tadeusz Wojciechowski (25 July 1925 – 18 November 2026) was a Polish economist, manager and state official. He held a postdoctoral degree (doktor habilitowany) in economic sciences and was a full professor, specializing in marketing and business economics. Wojciechowski was a participant in the Warsaw Uprising and the Second World War, served as Undersecretary of State at the Office for Material Economy (1976–1982), and was the rector of the Helena Chodkowska University of Management and Law.

== Early life and career ==
Wojciechowski was born in Warsaw, Poland, on 25 July 1925, the only child born to Aleksander and Irena (née Spalińska), who was an actress by training. Wojciechowski's father, a banker, an officer in the 2nd Brigade of the Polish Legions, and an activist in the Polish Socialist Party, was killed during the Warsaw Uprising, in which he had fought under the nom de guerre "Macedończyk." He came from a well-to-do family, but lost his home in a bombing in 1939. Between 1938 and 1944, he served as a troop leader and inspector within the Polish Scouting Association (Związek Harcerstwa Polskiego). Before the war, he attended the Ludwik Lorentz Gymnasium; during the war, he continued his education at a commercial gymnasium through clandestine classes (tajne komplety). About New Year's 1942, he joined the Szare Szeregi (Grey Ranks), the underground Polish Scouting movement, where he was affiliated with the "Assault Groups" (Grupy Szturmowe), which undertook minor acts of sabotage and scouted routes for couriers. He operated in the underground under the pseudonyms "Olek" and "Globus." During the Warsaw Ghetto Uprising, he delivered food to the Jewish side. He fought in the Warsaw Uprising as a rifleman in the Home Army (Armia Krajowa), serving initially as a courier for the "Jan Kiliński" Battalion, and from mid-August, as part of the Scout Field Post (Harcerska Poczta Polowa). He took part in providing cover for the capture of the PASTA building. After the collapse of the Uprising, he was held in German captivity, at first in Stalag XI-B (Bad Fallingbostel), and thereafter in Stalag VI-J (Dorsten). Wojciechowski's duties included, among other things, clearing the city's rubble. In January 1945, he was wounded during a bombing raid on the stalag (in which he suffered cerebral hypoxia); he later escaped, but was briefly detained again after surrendering. Along with other prisoners of war, he was marched toward a camp in Paderborn, where he was liberated by Canadian forces in April 1945. During April and May 1945, he served alongside these troops in the last phase of World War II, tasked with guarding an aerodrome that had been set up near Celle. From July 1945, he worked as a guard at various camps within the British occupation zone in Germany.

He returned to Poland in late October or early November 1945. He was active in the Union of Independent Socialist Youth (1946–1948) and the Polish Youth Union (1948–1956, serving, among other roles, as the chairman of a local branch), as well as the Union of Participants in the Armed Struggle (from 1946; this organization later joined the Society of Fighters for Freedom and Democracy). In 1962, he joined the Polish United Workers' Party. After 1945, he worked at the Iron and Steel Central Office in Katowice and the Central Office for Material Supply to the Metal Industry (1950–1958). Subsequently, he served as deputy director for economic and commercial affairs at a lighting equipment manufacturing plant and worked at the "Zelmot" automotive electrotechnical plant. From 1962, he acted as secretary of the Council for Packaging Economy at the Central Packaging Institute, and later served as deputy director of the Pomeranian Foundry and Enamelling Plant in Grudziądz (1963–1964). Later, he was employed by the Planning Commission at the Council of Ministers, where, from 1964 to 1971, he headed the Material Management Team. From 1971 to 1972, he served as the Director General of the Central Office for Material Supply for the Construction Industry. In April 1972, he became the Deputy Chairman of the State Council for Material Management; after the council's reorganization, he served as Undersecretary of State at the Office for Material Management from April 1976 to May 1982. He also chaired the Interdepartmental Commission for Warehousing and Cargo Units (1976–1979).

Wojciechowski passed his matriculation examination as an external student in Katowice, though he initially faced obstacles in gaining admission to higher education. In 1948, he began his university studies in Katowice, completing them in Warsaw. He defended his doctoral thesis in 1972 and subsequently earned his habilitation degree. On 19 June 1989, he was awarded the title of professor in the field of economic sciences. He held the position of full professor at several institutions, including the Private School of Business and Administration (within its Faculty of Economic Administration and Computer Science, and the Institute of Management and Marketing), the Helena Chodkowska University of Management and Law (within the Department of Management and Marketing), ALMAMER University in Warsaw, and the School of Management and Marketing in Sochaczew. During the era of the Polish People's Republic, he also lectured at the Central School of Planning and Statistics in Warsaw, the Plekhanov Institute of National Economy in Moscow, and the University of Economics in Prague.

He served as dean of the Faculty of Economic Administration and Computer Science at the Private School of Business and Administration, as well as the Faculty of Management and Marketing at the School of Management in Warsaw; he also held the position of rector at the Helena Chodkowska School of Management and Law.

== Death ==
Wojciechowski died in Marki, Masovian Voivodeship, on 18 November 2026, at the age of 101.

== Awards ==
- Commander's Cross of the Order of Polonia Restituta
- Officer's Cross of the Order of Polonia Restituta
- Warsaw Uprising Cross
- Medal of the 30th Anniversary of People's Poland
- Medal of Victory and Freedom 1945
- Silver Medal "Medal of Merit for National Defence"
- Medal of the Commission of National Education
- Cross "For Service to the ZHP" with Swords
- Gold Honorary Badge "For Merits to Warsaw"
- Decoration of the 2nd Canadian Army

In 1944, he was recommended for the Cross of Valour (it is not certain whether he was actually awarded it).
