= Bob Moore =

Bob Moore may refer to:

- Bob Moore (musician) (1932–2021), American session musician
- Bob Moore (executive) (1929–2024), co-founder of Bob's Red Mill
- Bob Moore (American football) (born 1949), American football tight end
- Bob Moore (Australian footballer) (1872–1938), Australian footballer for Melbourne
- Bob Moore (Irish footballer), 1887 Irish international footballer
- Bob Moore (gambler) (c. 1953–1997), New Zealand horse bettor
- Bob Moore (politician) (1923–2011), member of the Queensland Legislative Assembly
- Bob Moore, Canadian film producer, head of business and legal affairs at EyeSteelFilm
- R. I. Moore (1941–2025), British historian from the Newcastle University
- Bob Moore (historian), British historian from the University of Sheffield

== See also ==
- Robert Moore (disambiguation)
- Bobby Moore (disambiguation)
