= Bobby Moore (disambiguation) =

Bobby Moore (1941–1993) was an English footballer.

Bobby Moore may also refer to:

== Sports ==
- Bobby Moore (pitcher) (1958–2015), former Major League Baseball pitcher for the San Francisco Giants
- Bobby Moore (outfielder) (born 1965), former Major League Baseball outfielder for the Kansas City Royals
- Bobby Moore (motorcyclist), former world champion motocross racer
- Bobby Moore or Ahmad Rashad (born 1949), American former football player

== Others ==
- Bobby Moore & the Rhythm Aces (1930–2006), 1960s R&B group
- Statue of Bobby Moore, Wembley, a 2007 statue of the footballer outside Wembley Stadium, London
- Bobby James Moore: American murderer and the subject of Moore v. Texas (2017), to determine if he had a mental disability that would disqualify him from receiving the death penalty

== See also ==
- Robert Moore (disambiguation)
- Bob Moore (disambiguation)
