= It's Cool in the Furnace =

Children's Christian musical by Buryl Red and Grace Hawthorne

It’s Cool in the Furnace
- Music: Buryl Red
- Lyrics: Grace Hawthorne
- Book: Grace Hawthorne
- Basis: Chapters 1–3 of the Book of Daniel

It's Cool in the Furnace is a children's Christian musical composed by Buryl Red, with book and lyrics by Grace Hawthorne. Based on the opening three chapters of the biblical Book of Daniel, it dramatizes the experiences of Daniel, King Nebuchadnezzar, and Shadrach, Meshach, and Abednego. A cast recording was issued by Word Records in 1972, and the publisher dates the release of the stage musical to October 15, 1973.

Written primarily for church and school children's choirs, the approximately 40-minute work is scored for unison voices with optional two-part singing. The published score also includes parts for Orff instruments, melodic instruments, small percussion instruments, and short instrumental obbligatos. The musical can be staged with two principal actors or presented in narrated concert form.

== Development ==
‘‘It’s Cool in the Furnace’’ was the second musical created by Red and Hawthorne as a writing team, following ‘‘Lightshine’’. According to Hawthorne, record producer Billy Ray Hearn approached Red about developing a musical specifically for young performers and requested that Red and Hawthorne work together again. Hawthorne sought a biblical narrative involving young people, a clear plot, and distinctive characters, eventually selecting the story of the fiery furnace.

Hawthorne recalled that the recording sessions took place in Nashville and New York, with instrumental sessions at Woodland Studios in Nashville. She deliberately avoided then-current children’s slang, believing that fashionable expressions would quickly date the work. Red and Hawthorne instead used the word “cool” in the title and refrain because of its already long-established colloquial meaning.

The original recording was arranged and produced by Red. Its musicians included bassist Bob Moore, drummer Buddy Harman, guitarist Harold Bradley, multi-instrumentalist Charlie McCoy, keyboardist Bill Pursell, harpist Mary Alice Hoepfinger, and organist Sharron Lyon.

== Synopsis ==
The musical begins with Daniel and his companions being taken from Jerusalem to Babylon, where they enter the court of King Nebuchadnezzar. The king is troubled by a dream that his advisers cannot satisfactorily reveal or interpret. Daniel, relying upon God rather than the practices of the Babylonian wise men, is able to tell the king about the dream.

Nebuchadnezzar later commands his subjects to worship a great golden image. Daniel's companions Shadrach, Meshach, and Abednego refuse, maintaining that they must remain faithful to God. Their refusal is emphasized in the song “Know When to Say No.”

The three are condemned and thrown into a fiery furnace. When Nebuchadnezzar looks into the fire, however, he sees four figures walking unharmed. Shadrach, Meshach, and Abednego emerge without injury, leading the king and assembled people to acknowledge and praise their God. The title song treats the furnace episode with humor while retaining the story's themes of courage, fidelity, and divine protection.

== Musical numbers ==
The principal songs on the original cast recording are:

“Shadrach”

“Jerusalem Town”

“It Pays to Remember”

“Tra-La”

“Show Us the Dream”

“The King’s Decree”

“Know When to Say No”

“It’s Cool in the Furnace”

“Let the People Praise”

The work incorporates spoken dialogue and narration between the musical numbers. Its musical language draws upon popular, jazz-influenced, and church-choral idioms. Kazoos are used in connection with Nebuchadnezzar's court; Red described their nasal sound as suggesting an ancient instrument while also providing a humorous sound that performers of different ages and musical abilities could produce together.

== Publication and performance history ==
Word Records released the original LP in 1972 under catalog number WST-8580. The stage edition followed in 1973 and appeared in the publisher's Winter 1974 choral catalog.

The musical was widely adopted by children's church choirs. A 1975 notice in the ‘’Music Educators Journal’’ described ‘‘It’s Cool in the Furnace’’ as a popular work by Red and Hawthorne. Contemporary newspaper records include a 1976 performance by a junior choir in Springfield, Virginia.

Word Music issued a 35th-anniversary edition in 2008, accompanied by a new recording and educational resources. In a retrospective published for the musical’s 40th year in print, Red and Hawthorne discussed its continued use across three generations of young performers. Documented later presentations include a 2018 children’s choir production at First Baptist Church in Midland, Michigan, and a 2025 music and arts camp production at the Basilica of Saint Mary in Minneapolis.

In 1975, music educator Linda Mankin described It's Cool in the Furnace as a “popular” work by Red and Hawthorne. Contemporary newspapers documented performances by children's choirs soon after the musical's publication. In March 1975, the Saline Reporter announced that the Junior Choir of First Presbyterian Church in Saline, Michigan, would present the work, describing it as a “modern musical play.”

== Themes and style ==
The musical emphasizes faithfulness under pressure, the courage to refuse an immoral command, and confidence in divine protection. “Know When to Say No” presents the three young men’s refusal to worship the image as a lesson in moral decision-making, while “Let the People Praise” functions as the concluding affirmation of God’s faithfulness.

Although the work treats its biblical subject humorously, its creators described the central purpose as communicating lessons of faith, courage, commitment, and the distinction between right and wrong to children through contemporary musical and dramatic language.

== See also ==
• Book of Daniel
• Daniel 3
• Shadrach, Meshach, and Abednego
• Christian musical
