= Italian prisoners of war in the Soviet Union =

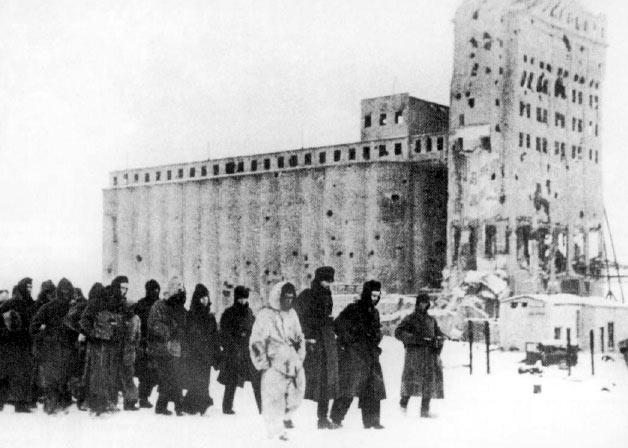
Axis POWs in Stalingrad

Italian prisoners of war in the Soviet Union is the narrative of POWs from the Italian Army in Russia (the ARMIR and CSIR) and of their fate in Stalin's Soviet Union during and after World War II.

== Characteristics ==
Over 60,000 Italian prisoners of war (POWs) were taken captive by the Red Army in the Second World War. Almost all of them were captured during the decisive Soviet "Operation Little Saturn" offensive in December 1942 which annihilated the Italian Army in Russia (Armata Italiana in Russia (ARMIR)).

At its height, the ARMIR was about 235,000 strong, and operated between December 1942 and February 1943 in support of the German forces engaged in and around Stalingrad. In this period the total figure of missing Italian soldiers amounted to 84,830 (Italian Ministry of Defence, 1977a 1977b). According to the Soviet archives, 54,400 Italian prisoners of war reached the Soviet prisoner camps alive; 44,315 prisoners (over 81%) died in captivity inside the camps, most of them in the winter of 1943. Another estimate for the death rate in the Soviet camp was 56.5%.

A 79% estimate of death rate has been suggested for the Italian soldiers held by the Soviet Union: (estimate by Thomas Schlemmer). According to Schlemmer, only 10,032 POWs were eventually repatriated out of approximately 48,000 that arrived in the POW camps. Another 22,000 died during the marches to the camps. Another estimate for the number of repatriated soldiers is 19,000-21,000 but it includes Italians captured by the USSR in later stages of the war.

A list of the soldiers' names, in Cyrillic, including date and place of death, was yielded by the Russian authorities after 1989 (Italian Ministry of Defence, 1996). 10,085 prisoners were repatriated between 1945 and 1954. The individual fate of 30,430 soldiers, who died during the fighting and the withdrawal or after capture, is less well known. It is estimated that about 20,000 men lost their lives due to the fighting and 10,000 men died between the time they became prisoners to the time they registered inside the camps.

Russian sources list the deaths of 28,000 of a total (according to them) of 49,000 Italian POWs in the Soviet Union from 1942 to 1954.

== The way to the POW camps ==
Travel to the destination camps in captivity covered hundreds of kilometres and was done mainly on foot. They were reported by survivors as the "davai" marches. "Davai!" is a Russian expression of urging, in this context meaning "keep moving!" The prisoners were escorted by the Red Army and often partisans without mercy for those who fell down frozen or exhausted (Revelli, 1966). The transfer was completed by using freight trains, where many prisoners died of the extremely cold temperatures and lack of food.

== Camps, treatment and causes of death ==
Suzdal 160, Tambov, Oranki, Krinovoje, Michurinsk, sited in Eastern European Russia, were the camps where most Italian POWs were detained in dismal conditions. Others were known just by their reference numbers, as Lager 58/c and Lager 171 (Italian Ministry of Defence, 1996). Typhus and starvation related diseases were the major causes of mortality inside the camps (Giusti, 2003). Brutality from the Soviet troops and partisans to unarmed prisoners was reported, but survivors testified also to episodes of comradeship among soldiers of the two opposing nations, especially on the front line (Rigoni Stern, 1965) and, compassion from the Russian civilians (Vio, 2004).

The Italian prisoners of war in the Soviet Union were subject to plenty of propaganda. The propaganda was delivered by Italian Communist cadres who had fled fascism in Italy to the Soviet Union, known in Italy as fuoriusciti (expatriates) (Zilli, 1950). Despite allurements and threats most of the prisoners, particularly if not previously compromised by fascism, resisted the propaganda (Giusti, 2000). Prisoners' conditions improved greatly with the spring of 1943 because of Soviet Government concern and better camp administration, sharply increasing the food supply and the numbers of soldiers surviving.

== Reasons for forgotten tragedy ==
The issue of Italian prisoners of war in the Soviet Union remained a hot political topic in post-war Italy. It was never seriously investigated because of the Soviet authorities' unwillingness to yield information about the destiny of the tens of thousands of missing soldiers. Their case was used in an instrumental way by the centre-right parties which accused the Soviet Union of not returning its prisoners of war (Democrazia Cristiana manifesto, 1948), and denied as anti-communist propaganda by the left (Robotti) during the first democratic elections in Italy (1948). Unbiased information underpinning the size of the tragedy and an objective historical reconstruction came only after the fall of the Soviet Union (Giusti, 2003) when most public interest in Italy had already faded away.

== See also ==
- Italian prisoners of war in Nazi Germany

== See also ==
- Italian prisoners of war in Australia
- Italian participation in the Eastern Front
- Military history of Italy during World War II
- Prisoners of war in World War II
- World War II casualties
- World War II casualties of the Soviet Union
