= Prisoners of war in World War I =

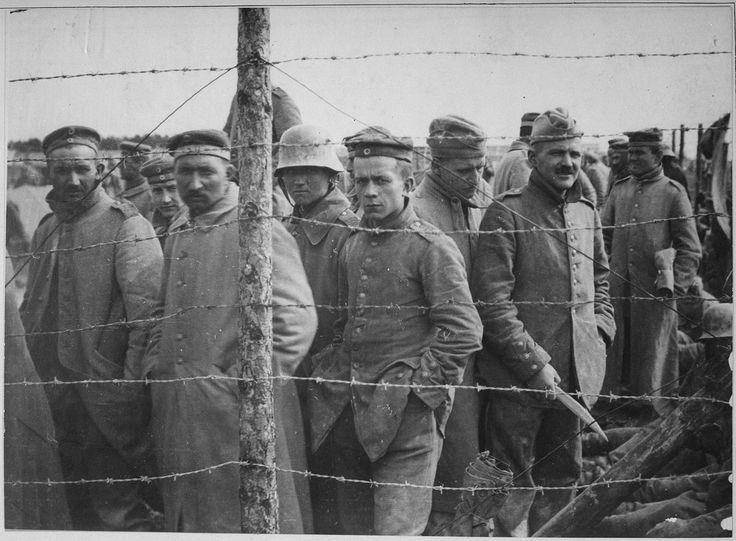
German prisoners in a French prison camp during the later part of the war

During World War I between 7–9 million soldiers surrendered and were held in prisoner-of-war camps. Approximately 10% (~750,000) died in captivity.

While the Allied prisoners of the Central Powers were quickly sent home at the end of active hostilities, the same treatment was not granted to Central Power prisoners of the Allies, many of whom served as forced labour, e.g., in France until 1920.

== Key statistics ==
Between 6.6–9 million soldiers surrendered and were held in prisoner-of-war camps during World War I.

25–31% of Russian losses (as a proportion of those captured, wounded, or killed) were to prisoner status, for Austria-Hungary 32%, for Italy 26%, for France 12%, for Germany 9%; for Britain 7%. Prisoners from the Allied armies totaled about 1.4 million (not including Russia, which lost 2.5–3.5 million soldiers as prisoners). From the Central Powers about 3.3 million soldiers became prisoners; most of them surrendered to Russians.

All nations pledged to follow the Hague Conventions on fair treatment of prisoners of war, and the survival rate for POWs was generally, though not always, much higher than that of combatants at the front. Starvation was common for prisoners and civilians alike. Soldiers that surrendered were not always taken as POWs, as they were sometimes gunned down by the prevailing army instead. Conditions were worst along the Austrian-Italian front, as well as in Bulgaria, Russia, Romania, and the Ottoman Empire.

=== Mortality rate ===
Estimates of the total mortality rate (the number of prisoners who died during the war) are usually given at the range of 750,000-751,000, which in turn is reported as between 8.7% to 10% of the total (depending on the estimates of the total number of POWs taken in this conflict).

In total numbers, the deaths included 478,000 Austro-Hungarian prisoners, 122,000 Germans, 38,963 French in Germany. 411,000 prisoners died in Russia (the majority of them Austro-Hungarian), and more than 100,000 Italian prisoners out of 350,000 in Austria-Hungary.

About 8% of Russians imprisoned by the Central Powers died. Estimates of mortality rate of prisoners held in Germany have been given at between 3.5% to 5%. In Austria, it was higher, at 7%.

Mortality rate of German prisoners held by the Allies has been estimated at 12.4%. Mortality rate of all prisoners held in France has been estimated at between 5.3% (for all POWs) to 9.4% (for the Germans). The overall mortality rate among captives in Russia has been estimated at 15–20%; more specific estimates have been given at 17.6% and 37% of the Germans. The mortality rate for German POWs held by other allies also varied significantly, and have been reported as varying from 1.92% in the United States, 3.03% in the United Kingdom, 9.4% in France, 37% in Russia and 39% in Romania.

The mortality rate was higher in states with less developed state structure, food shortages, and history of enmity between combatants. These differences are mainly due to differences in material conditions but also in the average duration of captivity, short in the United States, longer in France where the last prisoners were released at the beginning of 1920, in Russia where repatriations hampered by the civil war were continued until 1922. The high mortality rate in Russia is mainly due to climatic conditions, the unpreparedness of the authorities in the face of an unforeseen influx (lack of accommodation at the start of the war), not to a desire for persecution, that of Italian prisoners due to malnutrition in Austria affected by an extreme food shortage due to the refusal of the Italian government to send relief.

== Living conditions ==
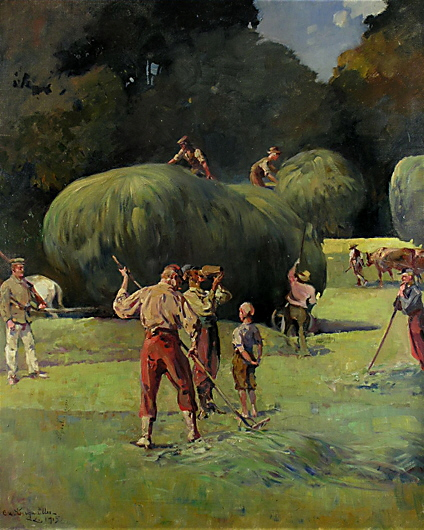
1915 painting depicting prisoners of war in Germany harvesting hay

The conditions of the POW camps were, in general, satisfactory (and much better than in World War II), thanks in part to the efforts of the International Red Cross and inspections by neutral nations.

The conditions at the camps were variable. While those put to work in agriculture fared well, other forms of work were dangerous to POWs, such as the digging of the Rove tunnel near the Étang de Berre in France, the demining of battlefields in France in 1919, comparable to those of the Russian gulag on the construction site of the railway line from Petrograd to Murmansk. This extreme situation was, however, not motivated by a punitive desire, but rather by the inorganization and negligence of the authorities. Article 7 of the Hague Convention provides for "treatment of prisoners in terms of food, clothing and bedding equivalent to that of the troops of the government which captured them". In fact, the prisoners' rations were conditioned by the supplies of each country. The prisoners of the Central Powers affected by the Allied blockade (Germany and Austria-Hungary) suffered from hunger like the rest of the population. French prisoners benefited from packages from their families which alleviated the deficiencies. Starting in July 1916, through the Red Cross, the French government provided collective packages of 2kg of bread per week to French prisoners. Russian prisoners, deprived of this assistance particularly suffered. In France and the United Kingdom, countries little affected by shortages, prisoners' rations remained more satisfactory though prisoners were struck by epidemics, typhus and cholera, especially at the start of the war, a period of unpreparedness for the unexpected influx into Russia and Germany. Subsequently, sanitary conditions improved.

== POWs by camp location ==
=== POWs in Canada ===
Twenty-four known prisoner-of-war camps existed across Canada during the First World War. The ethnic groups arrested and detained in internment camps were Austro-Hungarians (mostly Ukrainians) and Germans. Austro-Hungarian Prisoners were mainly residents of Canada from Ukraine, part of Serbia, the Czech Republic, Slovakia. Since Ukraine, part of Serbia, the Czech Republic and Slovakia were then provinces of the empire of Austria-Hungary, many still had Austro-Hungarian citizenship and were considered to be resident enemy aliens. William Dostock, for example, who immigrated to Canada in 1910 from Austria-Hungary and was not yet naturalized was interned from 1915–1920 as an enemy alien.

=== POWs in the German Empire ===
From the beginning of the war, the German authorities found themselves confronted with an unexpected influx of prisoners. In September 1914, 125,050 French soldiers and 94,000 Russian soldiers were held captive. Before 1915, conditions of detention in Germany were very harsh and marked by temporary lodging and the absence of infrastructure. The prisoners slept in hangars or tents, where they dug holes to keep warm. The humid forts requisitioned to serve as places of detention led to numerous cases of pulmonary illness. The German authorities also commandeered schools, barns and various other types of shelters. Camps were established in the countryside as well as near the towns, which had consequences when epidemics of cholera or typhus threatened to spread to the civilian population.

Not all the camps were situated on German territory; a certain number were built in occupied territories, notably in northern and eastern France. They began to be developed starting in 1915 when the number of prisoners being held captive in Germany reached 652,000. According to official directives, each prisoner had to have use of 2.5 m^{2}. The camps mixed a large number of nationalities sharing the same quarters: French, Russian, British, American, Canadian, Belgian, Italian, Romanian, Serbian, Montenegrin, Portuguese and Japanese prisoners were found there, as well as Greeks and Brazilians. Equally, soldiers of various social origins rubbed elbows: workers, peasants, bureaucrats and intellectuals were among those held. The number of prisoners rose very quickly. From February to August 1915, it went from 652,000 to 1,045,232. In August 1916, it reached 1,625,000, jumping to 2,415,000 by October 1918.

=== POWs in the Ottoman Empire ===
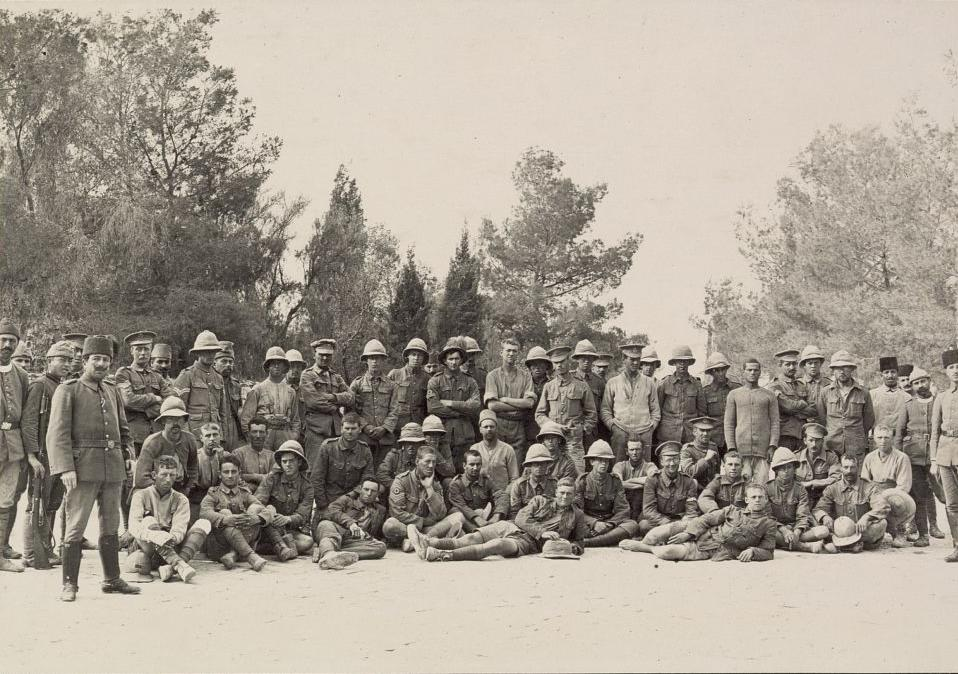
British prisoners guarded by Ottoman forces after the First Battle of Gaza in 1917

The Ottoman Empire often treated POWs poorly. Some 11,800 British Empire soldiers, most of them Indians, became prisoners after the siege of Kut in Mesopotamia in April 1916; 4,250 died in captivity. Although many were in a poor condition when captured, Ottoman officers forced them to march 1,100 kilometres (684 mi) to Anatolia. A survivor said: "We were driven along like beasts; to drop out was to die."

==== Ottoman POWs during the Capture of Damascus ====
At Kaukab 10,000 prisoners in a compound were joined by 7,000 more moved from a compound at El Mezze, "in deplorable condition." They died at first at 70 per day which slowed to fifteen a day, under the command of Lieutenant Colonel T. J. Todd, 10th Light Horse Regiment which took over guard on 7 October from two squadrons of 4th Light Horse Regiment and one squadron of 11th Light Horse Regiment commanded by Major Bailey. Todd found "[r]ations poor and no provision made for cooking. No drugs, or bandages for sick and wounded of whom about 3000 urgently required medical attention."

Todd had the weakest men transferred to houses in the village, supplied blankets and Syrian doctors to treat the sick, organised the prisoners into companies under their own officers, and sanitary arrangements were developed. Four doctors among the officer prisoners began working in the compound but none spoke English. On the first day 69 dead were buried; the next day 170. On 8 October five Ottoman mobile cookers were received and soup cooked for the sick. Four water troughs and four pumps were erected along the stream for the prisoners of war. Daily reports sent in urgently called for blankets, drugs and disinfectant. On 9 October 762 Ottoman officers and 598 other ranks were sent to the compound while there were no evacuations to the Jordan. Two interpreters arrived on 10 October and Lieutenant Colonel Todd appointed Commandant of Prisoners of War Damascus area. By the next day rations had become fairly satisfactory but drugs, blankets and disinfectant were urgently needed. By 18 October the first batch of 1000 prisoners were evacuated by road organised into groups of 100 with their own NCOs, others followed. On 30 October Jacob's Horse reported to relieve 10th Light Horse Regiment which marched out at 15:30 for Homs.

=== POWs in Russia ===
The Prisoners of war of the First World War in Russia included a majority of Austro-Hungarians (over 2,000,000), 167,000 Germans, and 50,000 Ottomans. Along with Germany, Russia held the largest number of prisoners during this conflict.

=== POWs in Switzerland ===
During World War I Switzerland accepted 68,000 British, French and German wounded prisoners of war (POW) for recovery in mountain resorts. To be transferred the wounded had to have a disability that would negate their further military service or interned over 18 months and deteriorating mental health. The wounded were transferred from prisoner of war camps unable to cope with the number of wounded and sat out the war in Switzerland. The transfer was agreed between the warring powers and organised by the Red Cross. In all, 219,000 prisoners were exchanged.

== Italian POWs ==
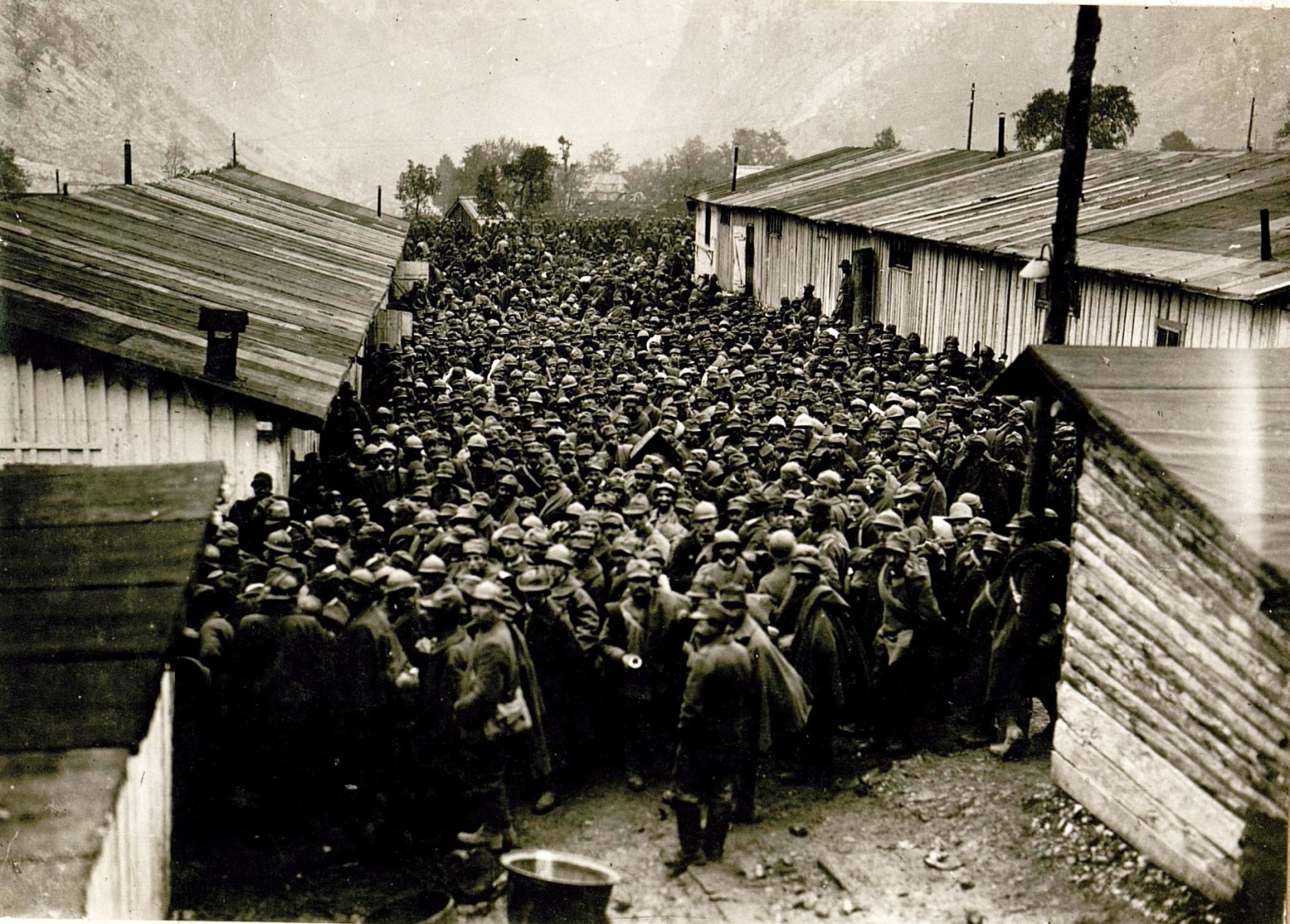
Italian prisoners after the Battle of Caporetto

Around 600,000 Italian soldiers were taken prisoner during the First World War, about half in the aftermath of Caporetto. Roughly one Italian soldier in seven was captured, a significantly higher number than in other armies on the Western Front. About 100,000 Italian prisoners of war never returned home, having succumbed to hardship, hunger, cold and disease (mainly tuberculosis). Uniquely among the Allied powers, Italy refused to assist its prisoners, and even hindered efforts by soldiers’ families to send them food. As a result, the death rate for Italian prisoners was nine times worse than that of Austro-Hungarian prisoners in Italy.

== Return of the prisoners ==
The November 1918 armistice provided for the repatriation of Allied prisoners without reciprocity. This lack of reciprocity is a violation of Article 20 of the Hague Convention of 1899, which reads: "After the conclusion of peace, the repatriation of prisoners of war shall be carried out as quickly as possible". The English prisoners were repatriated in November, and the return of the French prisoners ended in mid-January 1919. German prisoners were held in France until the beginning of 1920. They were released only after many approaches by the Red Cross to the Supreme War Council. The release of Austro-Hungarian and German prisoners in Russia, as well as Russian prisoners in Austria-Hungary and Germany, was provided for by the Treaty of Brest-Litovsk. This return was quite slow (500,000 Austro-Hungarians out of 2,000,000) and the Russian Civil War delayed the repatriation of some of the prisoners from Russia until 1922. The October Revolution and the Civil War also delayed the return of Russian prisoners from Germany. German prisoners were still being held in Russia as late as 1924.

== See also ==
- Joint War Organisation
- Lists of World War II prisoner-of-war camps
- Medal for civilian prisoners, deportees and hostages of the 1914-1918 Great War
- War crimes in World War I
- Japanese prisoners of war in Germany
- American prisoners of war in the First World War
- Brazilian prisoners of war in the First World War
- Newfoundland prisoners of war in the First World War
- Australian prisoners of war in the Ottoman Empire
- Russian prisoners of war in the Ottoman Empire (World War I)
- Russian prisoners of war in Bulgaria
- Bulgarian prisoners of war in Russia
- Austro-Hungarian prisoners of war in Montenegro
- Austro-Hungarian prisoners of war in Japan
- Prisoners of war in World War II
