= Robert More =

Robert More may refer to:

- Robert More (MP, born 1581) (1581–1626), English politician, MP for Guildford, and for Surrey
- Robert More (botanist) (1703–1780), British botanist, mayor of Shrewsbury, 1727 and MP for Bishops Castle, 1727–41 and Shrewsbury, 1754–61
- Robert More (MP for Dorset) (c. 1377–1422), MP for Dorset 1417
- Robert More (MP, died 1407), MP for Hampshire 1397
- Robert More (Wisconsin politician), 19th-century member of the Wisconsin State Assembly
- Robert More (MP for Dartmouth), MP for Dartmouth 1386
- Jasper More (Liberal politician) (Robert Jasper More, 1836–1903)

== See also ==
- Robert Moore (disambiguation)
