= Italian prisoners of war in Australia =

Italian POWs taken to Australia during World War II

Italian Prisoners of War in Australia
Total population
- 400,000 (1940 - 1946)

Languages
- Italian and other languages of Italy

Religion
- Christianity

Related ethnic groups
- Italian internees in Australia

Italian prisoners of war in Australia were Italian soldiers captured by the British and Allied Forces in World War II and taken to Australia.

On 10 June 1940, Italy entered the Second World War on the side of Germany. During the course of the war, Great Britain and their allies captured in Ethiopia and North Africa approximately 400,000 Italian troops, who were sent to POW camps all over the world, including Australia.

Between 1941 and 1945, Australia received custody of 18,420 Italian POWs. The bulk came from British camps in India. During this time prisoners wore burgundy/maroon clothing. Then, after Italy signed an armistice with the Allies in September 1943, the Australian authorities took between 13,000 and 15,000 Italian prisoners out of the POW camps and put them to work.

Over the period, several POWs escaped internment camps, at least one was shot for allegedly trying to escape from a camp, one committed suicide in a camp, fights between fascist versus anti-fascist supporting prisoners, and others was charged with criminal offences. At least one was named as a party to divorce proceedings.

Research undertaken of POWs in northern New South Wales indicated newspapers carried much anti-Italian sentiment: Unionists held concerns unpaid Italian POW labour would displace existing Australian labour; Inequality of Italian POWs had greater freedoms and better food than Australian POWs in overseas camps; and POWs should not be allowed to return to Australia post-war. On an individual level, rapport occurred between landowners and their POW labourers.

The Italian National Ossario at Murchison, Victoria holds the remains of 130 Italian soldiers and civilians who died while interned in Australia.

The Australian Federal Government is still yet, to apologise for interning Australian citizens because of where they were born, like what was done overseas with apologies given in such countries as the United States and Canada. A formal apology has been given by the state of South Australia and a motion passed in Western Australia, however to date no official apology has been given at the federal level for the injustices, but on March the 19th 2012, the house in the Federation Chamber during a private members session agreed to the acknowledgement of the injustice.

== Detainees during WWII in Australia ==
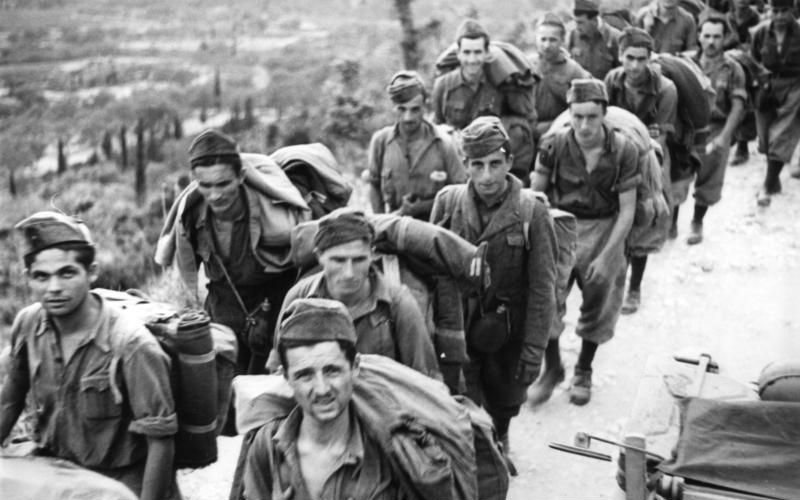
Italian POW in Australia

When Italy entered World War II aligning itself with Germany on 10 June 1940, the Australian government labeled citizens of Australia from Italian descent as a threat to the nation. Laws were enacted against these Italian descendants who were often seized and imprisoned by the Australian government. By the late 1940s, internment camps in Australia housed twenty percent of the Italian population in Australia along with other “enemy aliens” who were residents of Australia. The internment camps in Australia housed different types of groups consisting of “enemy aliens”, foreign internees, German and Italian prisoners of war, and politically affiliated foreign enemy nationals. There were also three hundred Aboriginal residents of the Cape York mission, a missionary community run by a German pastor, who were imprisoned. Thirty nationalities detained in the Australian internment camps during World War II, with the majority of prisoners being Italians, Germans, and Japanese. While some women and children held as prisoners, overall, the majority of detainees were men.

There were many internment camps built in every state which detained fifteen thousand internees and at least twenty-five thousand prisoners of war. The Australian government used eighteen larger internment camps as the main facility to detain majority of the “enemy aliens”, prisoners of war, and internees until the end of WWII. The numerous smaller internment camps which were built in each state were used as a temporary holding facilities. As many of the internment camps throughout Australia grew in size, a variety of communities within the camps were established by the ethnically and politically diverse detainees. The internment camps became the epicenter of diverse culture, ethnicity, and social status often leading to disputes breaking out between the communities, like fights between Italian Royalists and fascists. This pushed some Australian internment camps to adapt to the growing conflicts between the diverse communities by creating four separate compounds for the detainees within the camps.

== Locations of Italian internment camps in Australia ==
The internment camps built by the Australian government used borrowed lands from local farmers which were returned to land owners after World War II ended. There were numerous internment camps built in Australia during World War II to house Italian POWs. Evidence remaining of these camps only exists in few locations. The remains of some internment camps represent the ethno-cultural backgrounds of the detainees who were imprisoned during WWII. Through the monuments and facilities built by the internees and POWs, their cultural identity developed culture was on display for the Australian guards to observe.

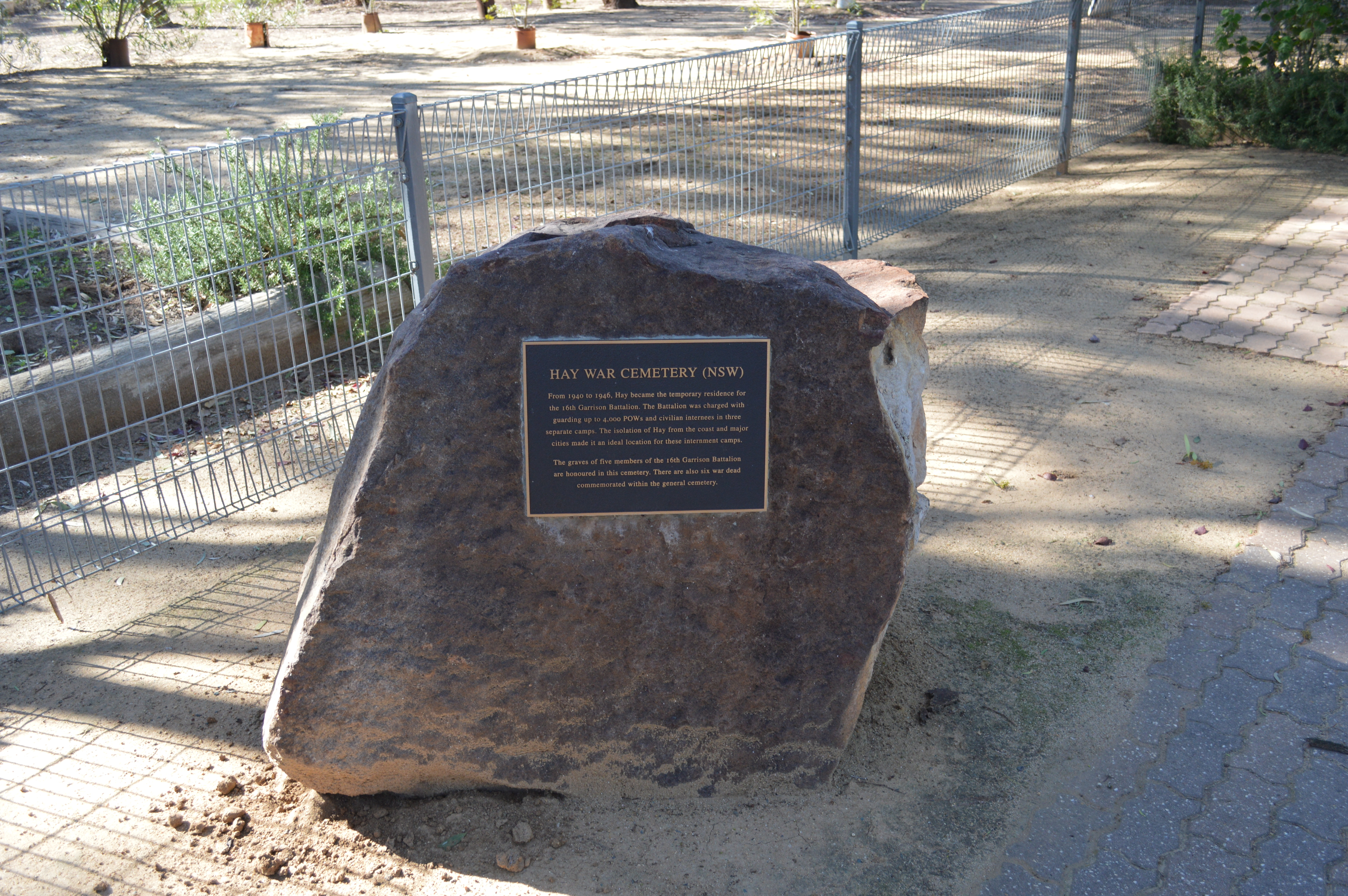
A cemetery monument in the Hay Camp

=== Hay Camp, New South Wales ===
Through funds from the British, the Australian government built Hay Camp in New South Wales from 1941 to 1942, which consisted of three camps. It housed a thousand inmates in each of the three camps during its operation which ended in 1946. There was a total of sixty-six thousand Italian and Japanese POWs, and German, Austrian, Italian, and Japanese “enemy aliens” housed in the Hay camp. The influence of the Italians within the camp is represented by the miniature model of the Colosseum which was built by the Italian POWs during their agricultural labor to present themselves to the Australian guards as “urban” and “civilized”.

=== Cowra Camp, New South Wales ===
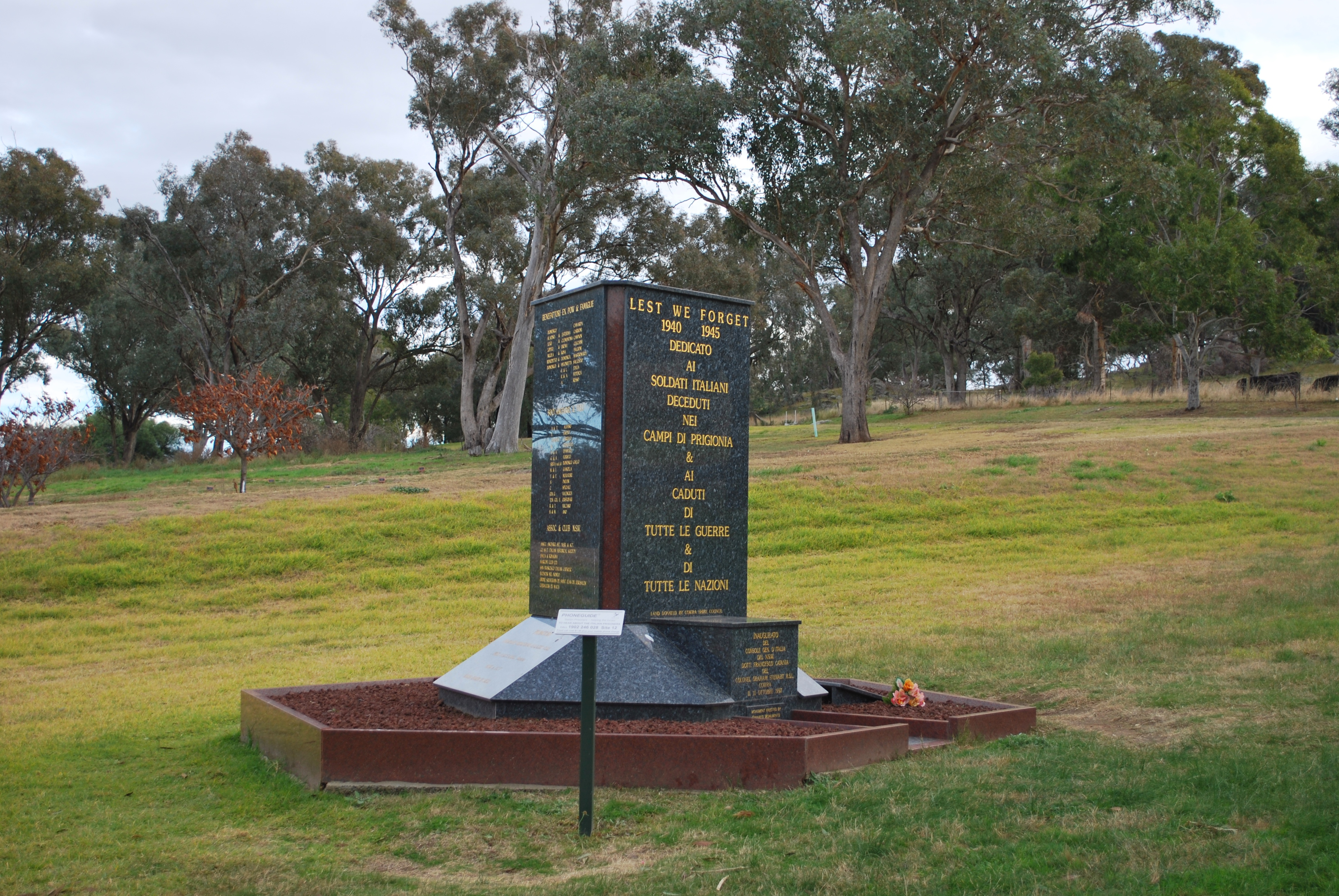
An Italian monument in the Cowra POW Camp

The Cowra Camp was built in NSW during 1941 to 1942, to house captured POWs sent by the British. It had four compounds—A, B, C, and D. Two of these compounds were used as temporary holding facilities of detainees while two were for more permanent housing. From 1943 to the end of World War II in 1945, there were estimated to be fourteen thousand Italian POWs sent by the British. These Italian POWs were divided into the two compounds, A and C, which held approximately a thousand POWs in each. Besides the Italian POWs, there were Indonesians and Japanese POWs who were detained in the same two compounds. The remains of the Cowra Camp still exist in a rundown condition of ingrown trees with bits of bricks, stones, and other pieces of the infrastructure.

=== Loveday Camp, South Australia ===
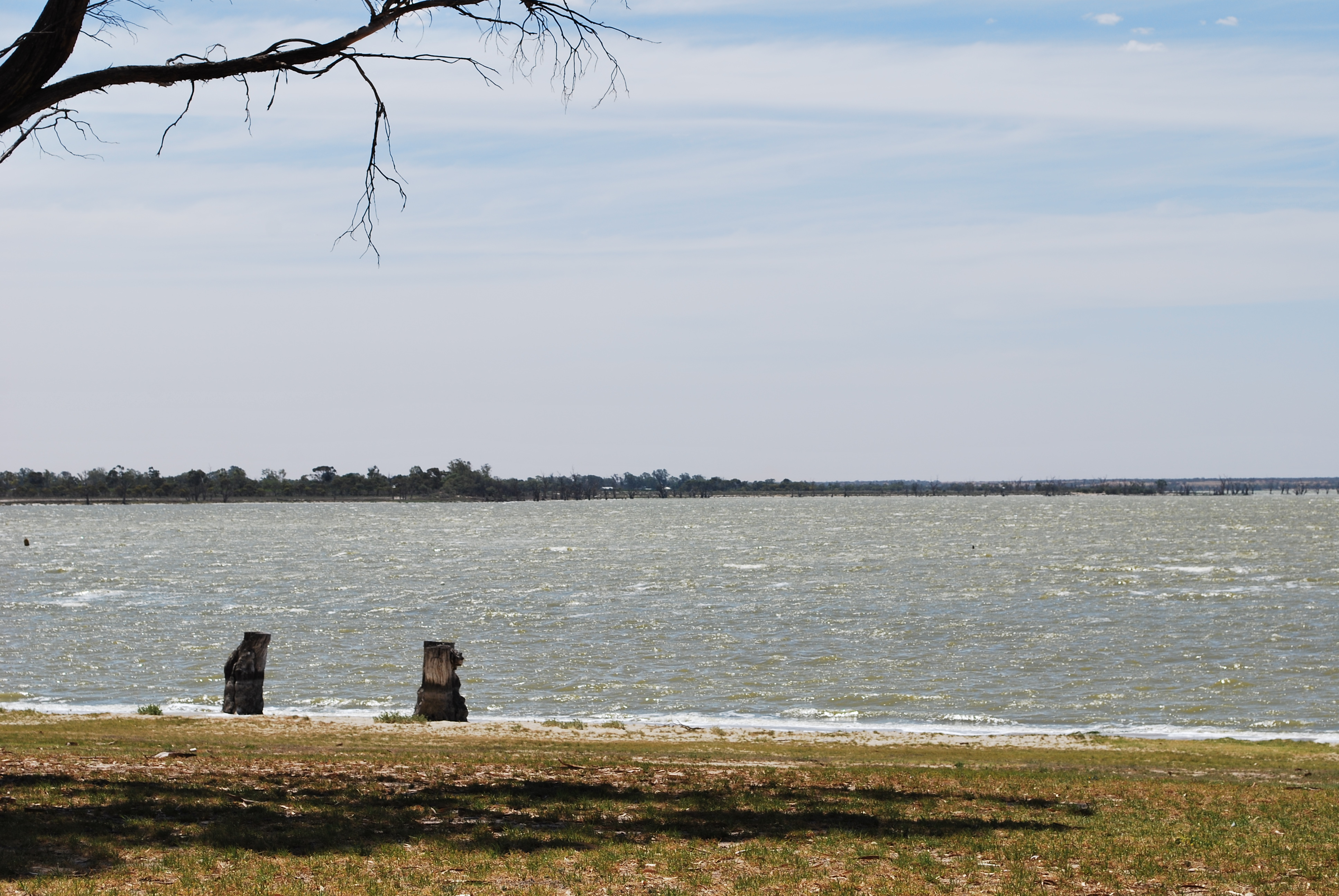
The Lake Bonney in Barmera where the Loveday Camp was located

The Loveday Camp was located near Barmera, where the freshwater Lake Bonney is situated, which had six separate compounds to accommodate Italian, German, and Japanese internees. The internees that were sent to the Loveday camp during WWII by the Australian government worked as paid labors to harvest wood and work on railway roads. At its height, the internee population reached three thousand nine hundred fifty-one during its operation. While there were POWs from the Dutch East Indies (also known as Indonesia), the Pacific Islands, New Zealand, England and the Middle East, there were no records of Italian POWs housed in the Loveday Camp. There was a total of one hundred thirty-four internees and one POW recorded deaths in the camp due to illnesses.

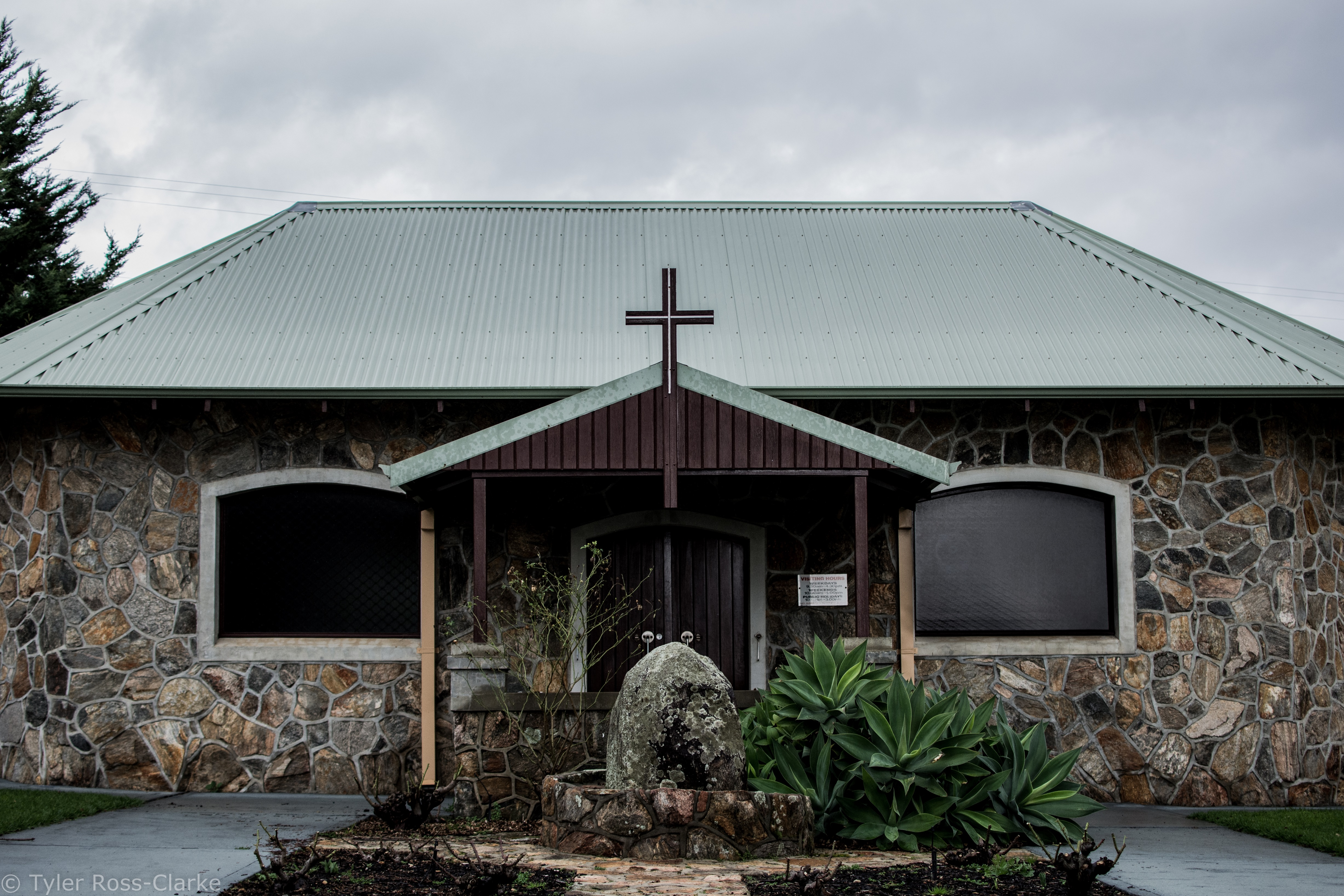
A memorial monument in the Harvey Internment Camp

=== Harvey No. 11 Camp, Western Australia ===
The Harvey camp, specifically the Camp eleven in the facility, housed Italian “enemy aliens” and a few Italian POWs from September 1940 to April 1942. The Harvey Number eleven camp was built mainly as a temporary holding facility due to its small holding capacity in housing “enemy aliens” and POWs. The Australian government transferred many of the Italian “enemy aliens” from this camp to the Loveday camp in South Australia later in WWII as it was a bigger facility.

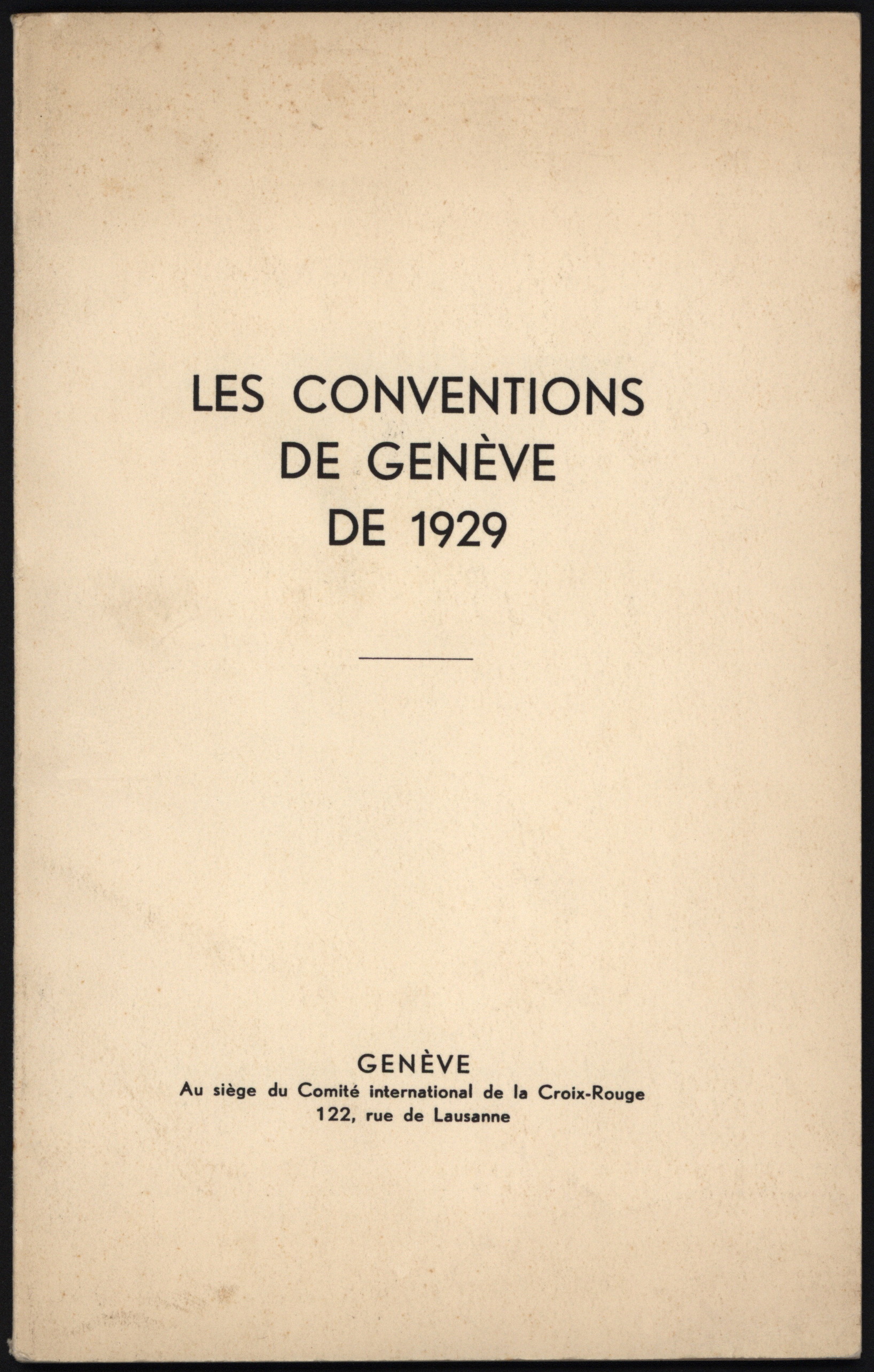
The 1929 Geneva Convention followed by the Australian internment camps

== Inside the internment camps ==
The majority of captured WWII Italian POWs were treated well and respected fairly across Australia by the Australian guards of the internment camps and the local community. Since the 1929 Geneva Convention was implemented prior to the creation of the WWII internment camps in Australia, there were not many significant incidents of mistreatment by the Australian guards. Although the Australian guards respected the prisoners, there were still some violence within the camps due to ideological divides between the prisoners. As the population of the Italian POWs in the Australian internment camps increased in 1941, it made the job of the Australian intelligence agencies in controlling the conflicts between the fascists and the anti-fascists harder. This separation of the Italian fascists and the anti-fascists groups, also known as the Royalists, shaped social dynamics inside the camp which was influenced the policy structure of the internment camps of Australia. The policy created from the 1929 Geneva Convention was followed closely by the Australian guards, but there was still some discrimination faced by the Italian POWs. The Italian POWs were labeled by the Australian guards as weaker and lacking in the skills of warfare compared to the Japanese POWs and the German POWs.

Since the Australian internment camps housed both the Italian internees and the Italian POWs within the same internment camps, they shared the same facilities. The labor work found inside the internment camps and on farms were shared as well among the Italian internees and the Italian POWs with slight differences in the enforcement of the labor work. The Italian POWs were forced to work on projects inside the internment camps and farms without any pay, whilst the Italian internees were given some minimum pay for their hourly work.

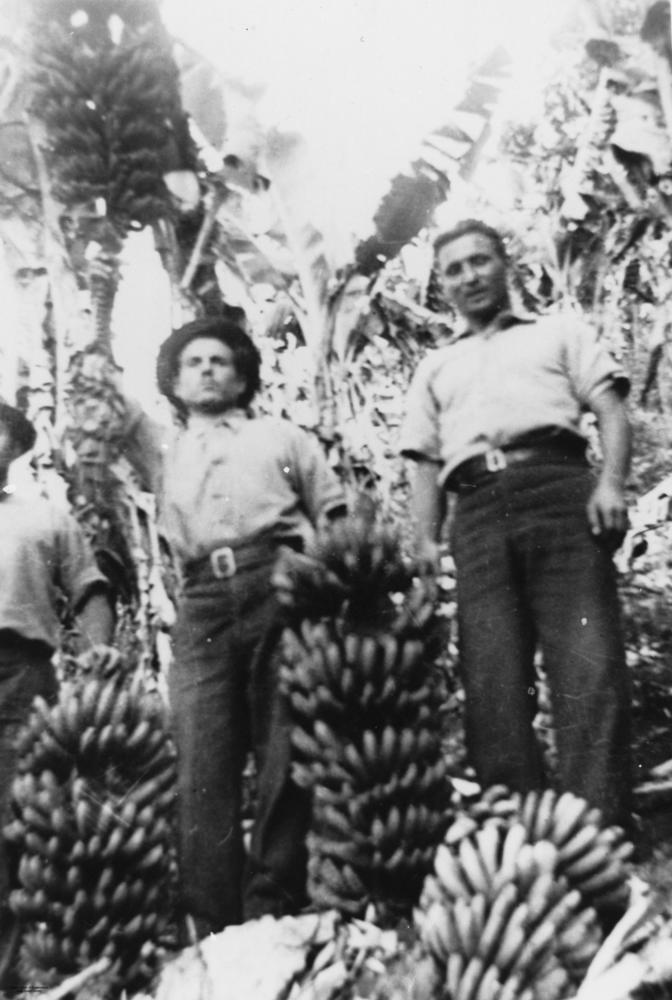
Italian POW working on the Beattie's farm

== The influence of the Italian POW in Australian farms ==
While there were many foreign POWs who were captured and sent to one of the Australian internment camps during the WWII, there were fifteen thousand Italian POWs, out of the thirty-five thousand Italian POWs captured in Northern Africa, who were sent directly to farms such as in Queensland. These Italian POWs who were sent to farms for agricultural work greatly impacted the labor market of Australia in the 1940s which had shortages of labor. This plan to allow Italian POWs to work on local farms without any guards was issued by the Australian government. During this process of the enforcement, there was some opposition against the labor practices from the Australian Worker’s Union and some Australian Labor Party officials.

While there were these opposition groups and language barriers between the farmers and the Italian POWs, this labor policy played a significant role in the lives of the Australian farmers who found Italian POWs to be hard workers and great helpers to the local community. The majority of the Italian POWs who worked on farms created strong relationships with the farmers and the local community, which consequently allowed many of them to work on farms far away from their internment camps. By the end of WWII, the Italian POWs were allowed to be sent back home to Italy. However, due to the lack of transportation, all of the Italian POWs in Australia remained in the country up until 1947 when they were sent back to Italy. The Italian POWs who built strong relationships when they took part in the farm labor programs in Australia returned back to Australia after WWII ended resettling there to build families. There were some others who returned and married Australians whom they had met during the farm labor.

== Legacy ==
The history of Italian prisoners of war in Queensland is being researched by State Library of Queensland's 2020 John Oxley Library Award winner Joanne Tapiolas.

One brand of red wine currently produced in Australia is called "Rabbit & Spaghetti", this being the customary diet of Italian POWs in Australia.

== See also ==
- List of POW camps in Australia
- Italian Australians
- Italian prisoners of war in the Soviet Union
