= Bob Moore (historian) =

Bob Moore is a British historian who is professor emeritus of History at University of Sheffield. He specializes in European history.

== Selected works ==
- Prisoners of War: Europe: 1939-1956 (Oxford University Press, 2022) ISBN 978-0-19-187597-7
- Survivors: Jewish self-help and rescue in Nazi-occupied Western Europe (Oxford University Press, Oxford, 2010) ISBN 9780199208234
- Resistance in Western Europe (Berg, 2000) ISBN 9781859732748
- Victims and Survivors: The Nazi Persecution of the Jews in the Netherlands, 1940-1945 (Arnold, 1997) ISBN 9780340495636
- Refugees from Nazi Germany in the Netherlands, 1933-1940 (Martinus Nijhoff, 1986) ISBN 9789024732760
