= Robert Moore =

Robert Moore may refer to:

== Filmmakers ==
- Robert Moore (director) (1927–1984), American stage, film and television actor
- Rob Moore (executive) (born 1963), American producer at Walt Disney and Paramount
- Bob Moore, Canadian film producer since 2008, head of business and legal affairs at EyeSteelFilm

== Food executives ==
- Bob Moore (executive) (1929–2024), American co-founder of Bob's Red Mill
- Robert Moore, American chef, founder of 2010–2020 Moore's Delicatessen

== Military men ==
- Robert Scurlark Moore (1895–1978), U.S. Army major general and congressional liaison
- Robert H. Moore (1924–1978), American flying ace in Korean War

== Musicians ==
- Bobby Moore & the Rhythm Aces (1930–2006), American tenor saxophonist and bandleader with his soul group
- Bob Moore (musician) (1932–2021), American orchestra leader and double bassist
- R. Stevie Moore (born 1952), American multi-instrumentalist, singer and songwriter

== Politicians ==
- Robert Moore (Pennsylvania politician) (1778–1831), American congressman
- Robert Moore (Oregon pioneer) (1781–1857), American founder of Linn City
- Robert M. Moore (1816–1880), American mayor of Cincinnati
- Robert J. Moore (1844–after 1889), American legislator in Texas
- Robert E. Moore (1849–1921), American lieutenant governor of Nebraska, 1895–97
- R. Lee Moore (1867–1940), American politician and lawyer from Georgia
- Robert L. Moore (Arizona politician) (1874–1942), American state senator
- Robert Moore (Northern Ireland politician) (1886–1960), theologian and member of Stormont
- Bob Moore (politician) (1923–2011), Australian member of Queensland Legislative Assembly
- Robert S. Moore Jr. (born 1945), American member of Arkansas House of Representatives
- Rob Moore (politician) (born 1974), Canadian regional minister for New Brunswick and Newfoundland and Labrador
- Robbie Moore (politician) (born 1984), British Conservative MP for Keighley
- Robert Moore (Irish politician) (1688–1728), Anglo-Irish politician

== Sportsmen ==
=== American football players ===
- Bob Moore (American football) (born 1949), tight end in NFL
- Bobby Moore (American football) (born 1949), wide receiver and later sportscaster, a/k/a Ahmad Rashad
- Robert Moore (American football) (born 1964), safety and later coach
- Rob Moore (American football) (born 1968), wide receiver and later coach

=== Baseball players ===
- Bobby Moore (pitcher) (1958–2015), American minor leaguer with San Francisco Giants
- Bobby Moore (outfielder) (born 1965), American with Kansas City Royals, later coach
- Robert Moore (baseball) (born 2002), American second baseman

=== Cricketers ===
- Robert Moore (English cricketer) (1812–1857), first-class player at Oxford, later Anglican vicar
- Robert Moore (Irish cricketer) (1905–1945), American-born Irish slow left-arm orthodox bowler

=== Footballers ===
- Bob Moore (Irish footballer) (before 1870–after 1887), half back for Ulster in 1887
- Bob Moore (Australian footballer) (1872–1938), VFL player for Melbourne
- Bobby Moore (1941–1993), English footballer
  - Statue of Bobby Moore, unveiled in 2007

=== Hockey players ===
- Robbie Moore (ice hockey) (1954–2022), Canadian ice hockey goaltender
- Rob Moore (field hockey) (born 1981), English medalist and 2012 Olympian

=== Racers ===
- Bobby Moore (motorcyclist), American motocross racer

== Writers ==
=== Fiction ===
- Robert Moore Williams (1907–1977), American science fiction writer, a/k/a Robert Moore
- Robert Moore (poet), Canadian poet, actor, director, playwright and professor since 1980s

=== Nonfiction ===
- Robert Ross Rowan Moore (1811–1864), Irish political economist
- Robert Moore (1838–1922), president of American Society of Civil Engineers (ASCE)
- Robert Thomas Moore (1882–1958), American businessman, philanthropist and author of ornithology papers
- Robert Lee Moore (1882–1974), American mathematician and author of topology papers
- Robert Y. Moore (born 1931), American neurologist and chronobiologist
- R. I. Moore (Robert Ian Moore, 1941–2025), British historian and medievalist, a/k/a
- Robert L. Moore (psychologist) (1942–2016), American Jungian psychoanalyst, consultant and academic
- Bob Moore (born 1954), British historian of Holocaust (Danish resistance movement)

== Others ==
- Robert Waters Moore (1819–1884), Irish-born surgeon and physician in colonial South Australia
- Robert Moore (priest) (1872–1964), Australian Anglican archdeacon of Northam and dean of Perth
- Robert de Grimston Moore (born 1935), British occultist, founder of Process Church of the Final Judgment, a/k/a Robert Moor
- Robert Moore (gambler) (c.1953–1997), New Zealand horse bettor
- Bobby James Moore, American murderer in 1980, subject of Supreme Court death penalty case in 2017

== See also ==
- Robert Moor (1889–1972), French actor
- Robert More (disambiguation)
