= German atrocities committed against Polish prisoners of war =

German war crimes against Polish POWs during World War 2

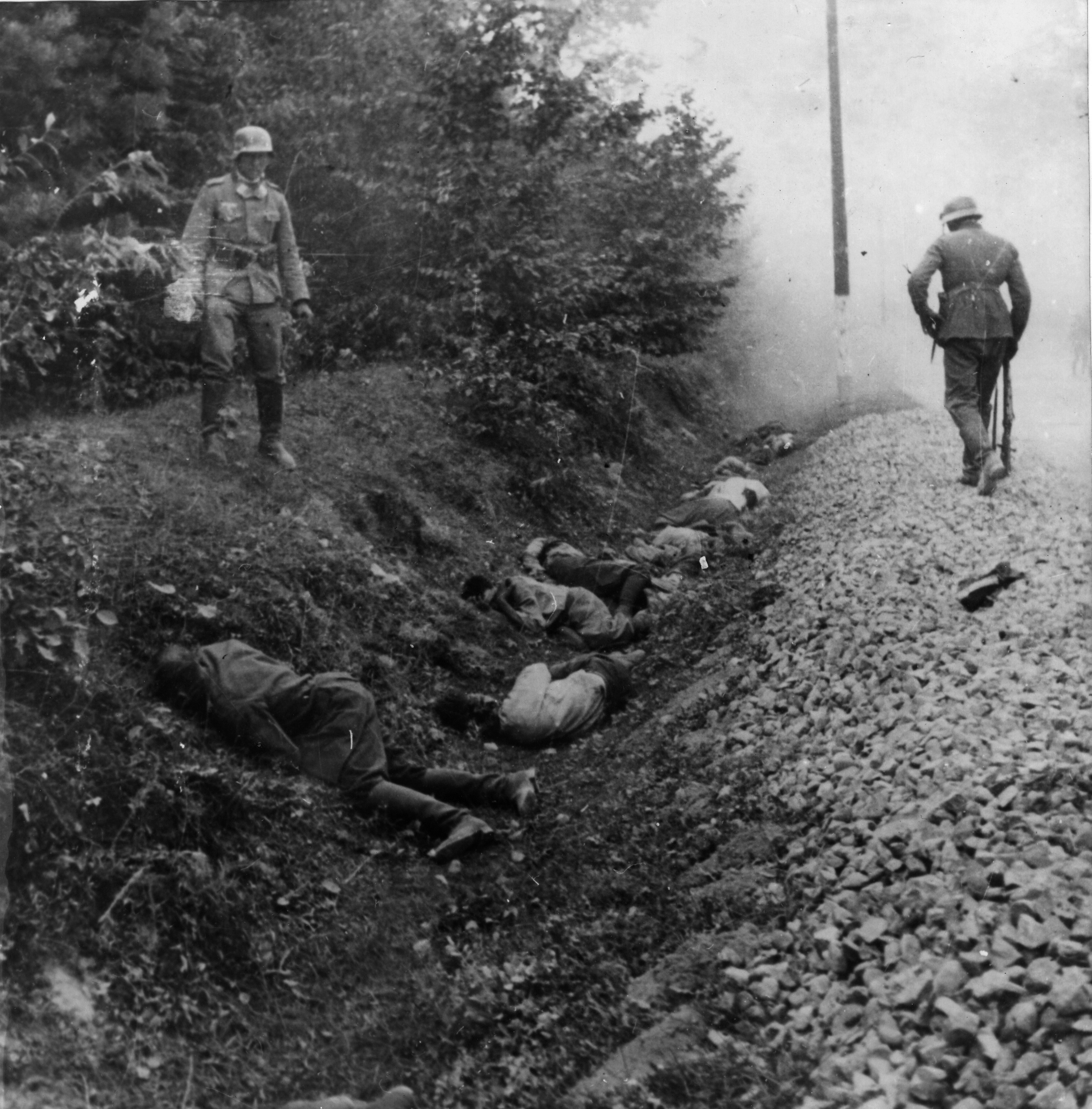
About 300 Polish POWs were executed by soldiers of the German 15th Motorized Infantry Regiment in Ciepielów on 9 September 1939.

During the German invasion of Poland, which started World War II, Nazi Germany carried out a number of atrocities involving Polish prisoners of war (POWs). During that period, the Wehrmacht is estimated to have mass-murdered at least 3,000 Polish POWs, with the largest atrocities being the Ciepielów massacre of 8 September 1939 (~300 victims) and the Zambrów massacre of 13–14 September (~200 victims). Most of those atrocities are classified as war crimes of the Wehrmacht. Jewish soldiers with the Polish Army were also more likely than others to be victims of various atrocities.

A number of other atrocities against Polish POWs occurred later in the war, particularly on the Eastern Front, with the largest atrocities in 1945 committed at Podgaje (~200 victims) and Horka (~300 victims).

== Background ==
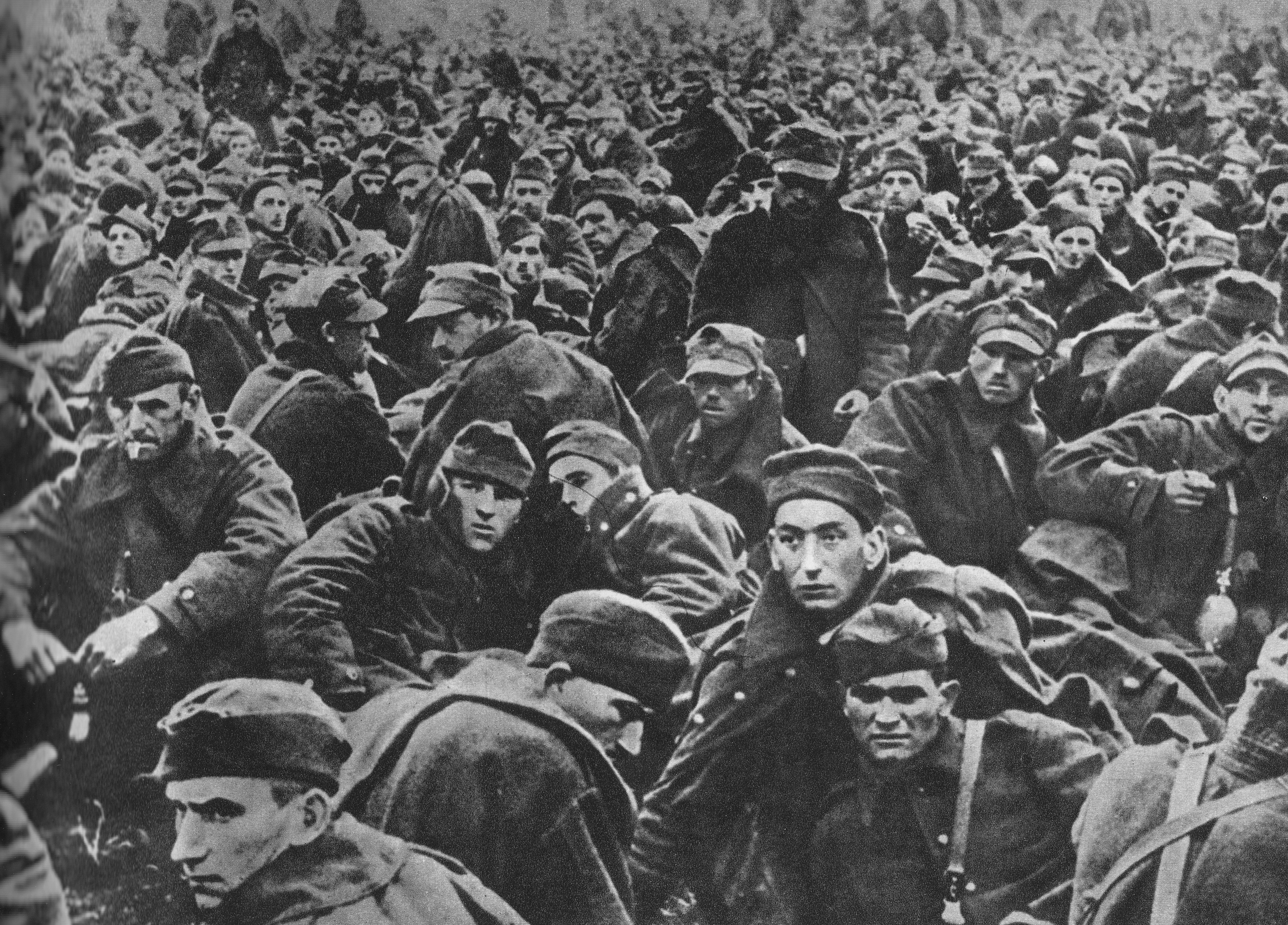
Soldiers of the Polish Army taken prisoner by German troops in September 1939

Before the war began, the Wehrmacht high command issued many radical and racist communiqués to its soldiers. In them, it warned soldiers against the alleged "fanatic" hatred of Poles towards the Germans and warned them to expect guerrilla warfare, sabotage and diversion, likely to be organized by Polish soldiers dressed in civilian clothes. This mentality likely increased the number of atrocities committed by the Germans on both Polish prisoners of war and civilians. According to Geoffrey P. Megargee, such war crimes were the result of contempt for Poles and Polish soldiers, encouraged by Nazi propaganda, which described them as German-hating Untermenschen; and lack of preparation, resources, and will to secure surrendered Polish soldiers. In addition, plans formulated by the German General Staff, prior to the invasion, authorized the SS to carry out security tasks on behalf of the army that included the imprisonment or execution of Polish citizens, whether Jewish or gentile.

Further, German officers often treated Polish soldiers of disorganized units captured behind German lines as partisans, not as regular soldiers, and felt justified in ordering their summary executions. On 4 September 1939, the Einsatzgruppen operating in Poland received an instruction to immediately court-martial and execute all alleged Polish partisans (Freischärler). In fact, this instruction led to mass executions of members belonging to Polish paramilitary formations and ad-hoc citizens watches (Straże Obywatelskie). These individuals were routinely labeled as "partisans" and summarily executed, even though they openly carried weapons and wore identifying marks or armbands as required by the Hague Convention.

== Invasion of Poland ==
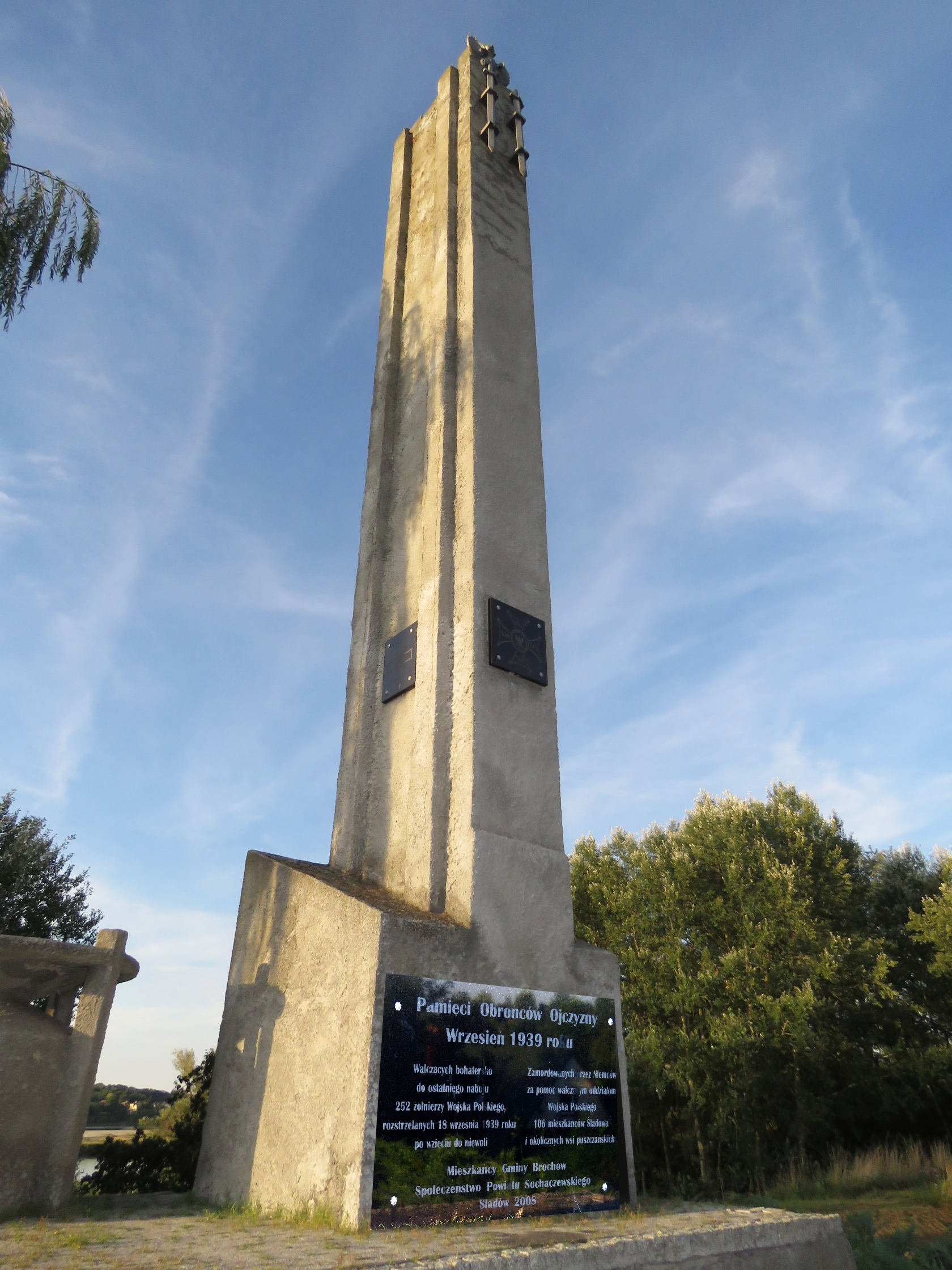
Śladów massacre memorial

Numerous examples exist in which Polish soldiers were killed after capture. Polish historian Szymon Datner listed 64 "instances of Polish prisoners being shot in captivity", and a number of other executions "where there had been some supposed provocation". Timothy Snyder, an American historian wrote that over 3,000 Polish POWs were killed in at least 63 separate shooting actions in which they were often forced to take their uniforms off. German historian Jochen Böhler also provided the same estimate, writing that the Wehrmacht mass murdered at least 3,000 Polish POWs during the campaign. Polish-American historian Tadeusz Piotrowski estimated the victims to be 1,000 POWs executed by the German army in September 1939, several hundred more executed by Gestapo, and about 1,200 members of the National Defense, as well as other volunteers like the post office workers involved in the Defence of the Polish Post Office in Danzig. Bob Moore suggested an even higher estimate, writing that "some 10,000 Polish servicemen who should have been considered as prisoners of war died at the hands of their captors during and immediately after the five weeks of war."

Already on the first day of invasion (1 September 1939), Polish POWs were murdered by the Wehrmacht at: Pilchowice, Czuchów, Gierałtowice, Bojków, Lubliniec, Kochcice, Zawiść, Ornontowice and Wyry.

Polish historian Tomasz Sudoł notes that several dozen of larger incidents can be documented, and that the number of smaller incidents – such as executions of individual soldiers – is "significant", but hard to estimate. With regards to the larger incidents, he mentions, chronologically, the massacres at:

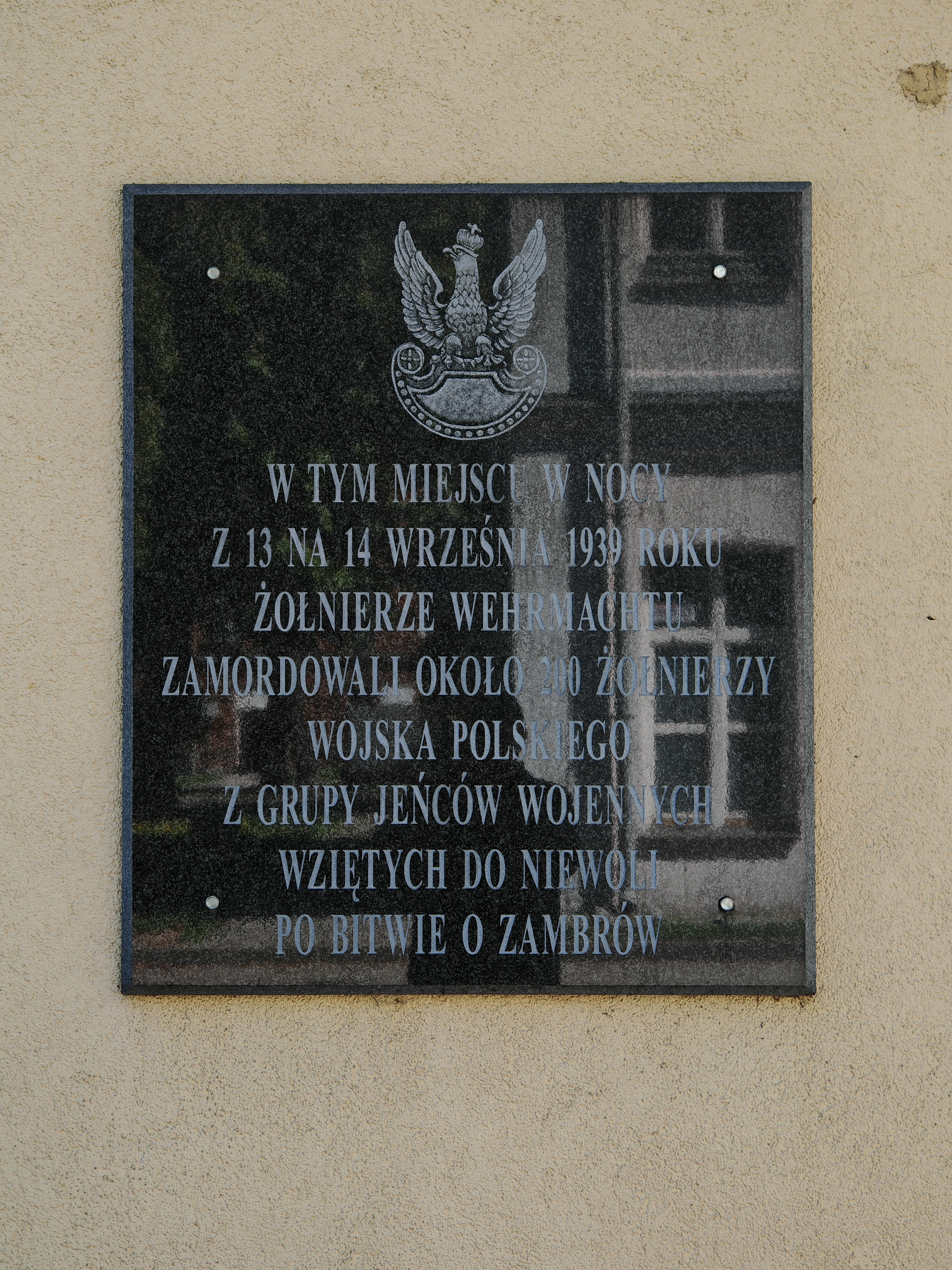
Memorial plaque at the place of the Zambrów massacre

- Bydgoszcz, where over 40 members of the local Citizens Watch, despite being guaranteed security by the Wehrmacht upon the capitulation, were handed over to the Einsatzgruppen and executed on 5 September. Some of them were beaten to death.
- Serock, where over 80 Polish prisoners of war were killed by the German troops (the Serock massacre of 5 September 1939);
- Moryca, where 19 Polish officers, prisoners of war, were executed on 6 September; several additional soldiers were executed around the same time in the nearby village of Longinówka;
- Mszczonów, where 11 Polish prisoners were executed by the 4th Panzer Division on 8 September;
- Piaseczno, where 21 Polish prisoners were executed, also on 8 September;
- Ciepielów, where about 300 POWs were killed (the Ciepielów massacre of 8 September 1939, carried out by the 29th Motorized Infantry Division);
- Stare Kozłowice, where 5 POWs were executed by the 2nd Light Division on 12 September;
- Szczucin, where about 40 POWs and 30 civilians were killed, also on 12 September (the Szczucin massacre);
- Zambrów, where a further 200 POWs were killed (the Zambrów massacre on the night of 13–14 September 1939);
- Śladów, where 252 POWs, or according to other sources – about 150 POWs and 150 civilians, were shot or drowned, probably by the 4th Panzer Division (the Śladów massacre of 18 September);
- Majdan Wielki, where 42 POWs were killed (the Majdan Wielki massacre of 20 September)
- Urych (formerly Urycz), where about 70–100 POWs were herded into a barn and burned alive (the Urycz massacre of 22 September)
- Sochaczew's district of Boryszew, where 50 POWs were killed (the Boryszew massacre of 22 September, sometimes called the Sochaczew massacre), and
- Zakroczym, where several hundred POWs were killed (the Zakroczym massacre of 28 September).

There were also incidents such as the Katowice massacre on 4 September, where among the 80 or so victims of local militia, it is estimated that there were some Polish soldiers who failed to evacuate with the larger formations.

In addition to massacres of POWs, there have been instances of refusal to provide medical aid to wounded soldiers, torture and other abuse of prisoners and repression against families and other relatives of the soldiers.

The prisoners in the temporary POW camp in Żyrardów, captured after the Battle of the Bzura, were denied any food and starved for ten days. In some cases Polish POWs were burned alive. Units of the Polish 7th Infantry Division were massacred after being captured in several individual acts of revenge for their resistance in combat. On 11 September, Wehrmacht soldiers threw hand grenades into a school building where they kept Polish POWs. In one documented incident, German tanks shelled a clearly marked Polish field hospital. On 14 September 1939, troops of the 206th Infantry Division perpetrated a massacre of 30 Polish POWs and 23 civilians in Olszewo, in revenge for the losses suffered in the battle against the Suwalska Cavalry Brigade.

Most of those atrocities are classified as war crimes of the Wehrmacht, as they occurred during the period of military occupation of Poland (untll 25 September).

German atrocities against Polish POWs have been discussed in the context of German later and even more extreme atrocities against Soviet POWs, as setting the stage for them. They have also led a number of historians to conclude that Germany violated the Geneva convection from early days of the war.

== Fate of Jewish POWs ==
As a prelude to The Holocaust, Polish POWs of Jewish origin were routinely selected and shot on the spot.

In transit camps for the Polish prisoners of war (German transit camps for prisoners of war, Durchgangslagers or Dulags) as well as in Stalags where privates and non-commissioned officers were held, the German military authorities established "inner ghettos" where Jewish POWs, were segregated from non-Jewish soldiers of the Polish Armed Forces. The treatment of Jewish POWs was harsher, and they were often assigned the most strenuous and degrading labor tasks. The Germans had plans to establish "inner ghettos" in Oflags as well, but in many cases they encountered opposition from Polish officers. Ultimately, for reasons unknown, "inner ghettos" for Jewish officers were only created in certain Oflags.

In December 1939 the German military authorities initiated the process of releasing the Jewish privates and NCOs from Stalags. In most cases, these soldiers were transferred to the labor camp at Lipowa Street in Lublin, which at that time also served as a transit camp for Jewish POWs. Due to the harsh conditions during transportation, many of them perished from freezing temperatures or died of starvation in the freight cars. The fate of approximately 500 Jewish POWs, who before the war had resided in Polish territories now annexed by Nazi Germany, was particularly tragic. In February 1940, as the Judenrat in Lublin refused to accommodate them, the Germans forced the POWs to undertake a march on foot, enduring freezing temperatures, to the city of Biała Podlaska, located 130 kilometers away. During this "death march", several hundred POWs were murdered. The remaining POWs were transferred from Lipowa Street camp to ghettos in the General Government before the end of May 1940. When Operation Reinhard commenced, they shared the same fate as other Jews.

Between December 1940 and February 1941, a minimum of 2,120 Jewish POWs, who had previously lived in Polish territories that were annexed by the Soviet Union, were permanently imprisoned at the Lipowa Street camp. The majority of them were murdered during the operation Harvest Festival in November 1943.

The fate of the Jewish officers was different. They remained in Oflags and majority of them survived the war.

== Conditions in POW camps ==
Polish POWs were held in German camps (Oflags for officers and Stalags for soldiers of lower ranks). Polish POWs at POW camps, temporary or long-term, have been poorly treated; Bob Moore noted that "some of the [poor] conditions could be ascribed to the speed of the German victory and the lack of adequate preparation, [but] there is no doubt that ill-treatment was also deliberately inflicted." Conditions of Polish POWs have been described as "much worse" than those of Western Allies with numerous infractions of the conditions stipulated by the Geneva convection. Some prisoners died due to malnutrition and environmental conditions; for example in January 1940 a group of 2,000 sick POWs were decreed to be released and transported from Germany to Poland; however, a tenth of them have frozen to death during the transport. Some POWs were used as forced laborers. Within several months, almost all non-officer prisoners of war (estimates range at 300,000-480,000) were stripped of their POW status and forced to work in Nazi Germany. Few dozens Polish officers were executed after having been recaptured during the failed escape attempt in 1943 from the Oflag VI-B.

== Treatment of deserters ==
Germany conscripted some Poles into its army; subsequently, some switched sides and joined the Allies side. Germans treated those who have been captured not as POWs but as deserters, to be put on trial.

== Warsaw Uprising ==
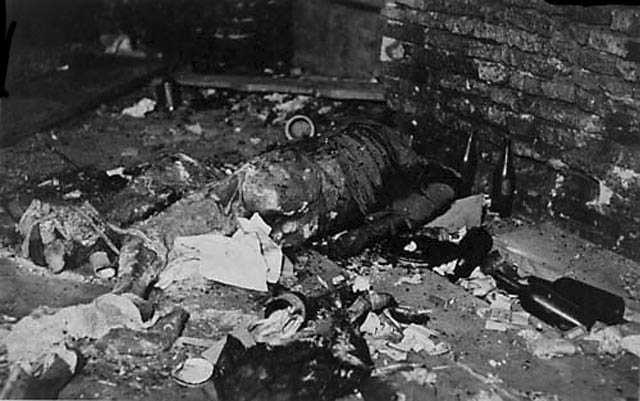
Remains of wounded Warsaw Uprising insurgents murdered by SS troops on 2 September 1944 at the military hospital at 7 Długa Street in Warsaw's Old Town

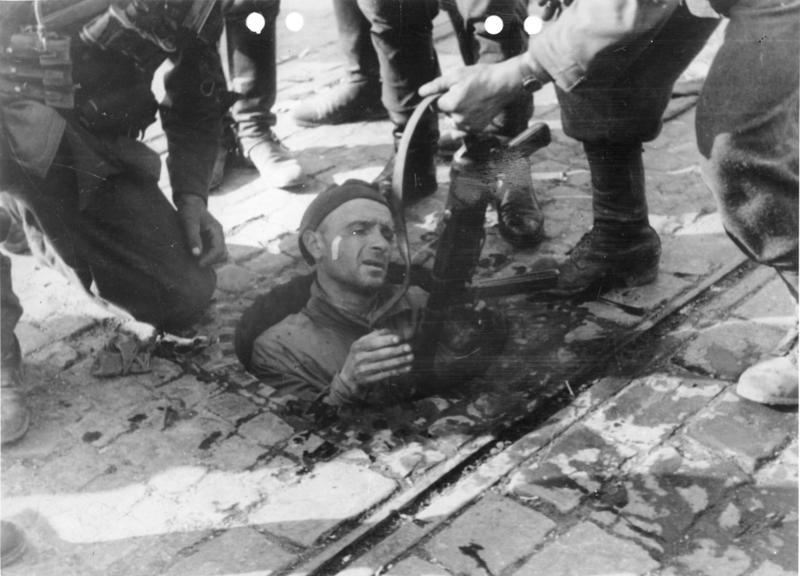
Warsaw, 27 September 1944: A Home Army soldier being dragged by Germans from the sewers. He was likely one of the 140 victims of the massacre that occurred that day at Dworkowa Street.

On 1 August 1944, the Polish Home Army (Armia Krajowa, AK) initiated an uprising against the Nazis in Warsaw. In accordance with the Hague Convention, the insurgents openly carried weapons and wore identifying white and red Home Army armbands. On 30 August 1944, the governments of the United States and United Kingdom officially recognized the Home Army as an integral part of the Polish Armed Forces in the West. They also issued a warning that any reprisals against its soldiers would be punished after the war. Additionally, on 3 September 1944, the Deutsches Nachrichtenbüro issued a communique acknowledging the combatant status of Home Army members. However, despite these declarations, the German forces continued to execute captured insurgents, including the wounded, until the final days of the uprising.

On 2 September 1944, following the capture of Warsaw's Old Town, German forces and their collaborators massacred at least 1,000 Polish POWs. Among the victims were predominantly severely wounded soldiers who had been left behind after the evacuation of Home Army forces through the city's sewers to Śródmieście. The methods of execution included shooting and burning individuals alive. In some instances, Polish nurses who had stayed with the wounded soldiers were raped and subsequently executed.

Executions of POWs and massacres in military hospitals also took place during the battles in other districts of Warsaw, including Wola, Ochota, Mokotów, Powiśle, Solec. In the case of the latter, after the district was ultimately captured by German forces on 23 September 1944, some victims, including five nurses and military chaplain Fr Józef Stanek, were hanged by SS members. On 27 September 1944, following the fall of Mokotów, approximately 140 AK soldiers who had become disoriented in the sewers and mistakenly surfaced near the German barracks were executed by members of the Ordnungspolizei at Dworkowa Street.

Captured insurgents were routinely executed by German forces until the end of September 1944. However, when the negotiations on the capitulation of Warsaw started, a different approach was adopted. According to the capitulation treaty, which was signed on October 3, 1944, the German side agreed to respect the combatant status of AK soldiers. Consequently, after the capitulation of the Polish forces in Warsaw, approximately 15,000 insurgents, including around 900 officers, were taken captive and sent to POW camps in Germany.

== Atrocities during final stage of the war ==
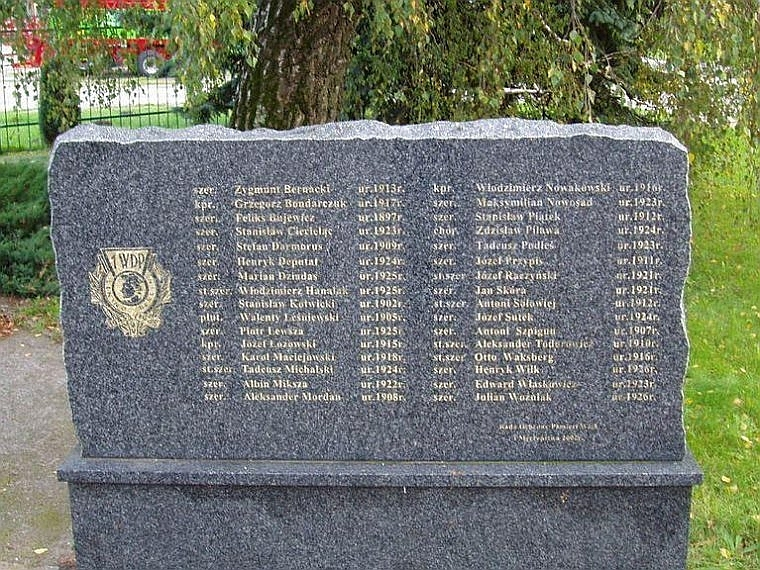
Podgaje massacre memorial

Polish prisoners of war were also executed later in the war. Piotrowski writes that "some Polish officers captured in 1944 in Hungary and several hundred POWs from the Polish People's Army captured in 1944–45 were also killed." In February 1945, during the breakthrough of the Pomeranian Wall, approximately 150–200 POWs were executed by the Germans in Podgaje, an event known as the Podgaje massacre of 2 February 1945.

Some Polish POWs were executed after being captured trying to escape from German internment camps, including 37 officers captured during the escape from German prisoner-of-war camp Oflag VI-B in Dössel in 1943, and six Polish airman among the few dozen of Allied victims of the Great Escape in 1944 from the camp Stalag Luft III in Żagań (the Stalag Luft III murders).

Memorial in Żagań to victims of the Stalag Luft III murders

During the Battle of Bautzen in April 1945, Wehrmacht and Waffen-SS units committed numerous war crimes against POWs and wounded soldiers from the Polish Second Army. One of the most notorious crimes occurred on 26 April 1945, near the village of Horka, close to Crostwitz. In that location, Wehrmacht soldiers massacred the hospital column of the Polish 15th Sanitary Battalion, resulting in the deaths of around 300 POWs, including wounded soldiers and members of the medical personnel (the Horka massacre).

== Aftermath ==
German atrocities committed against Polish prisoners of war have been poorly documented until recently. Much of the wartime documentation written by the Polish Red Cross was lost during the war, and the prisoner-of-war massacres from 1939 were often overshadowed by the subsequent crimes committed on civilian population.

Even after the war ended, as late as mid-1970s, some German courts dismissed accusations that German troops committed war crimes, claimed that the executed individuals were not wearing military uniforms, or that the evidence of atrocities is lacking or poorly documented.

Much of the pioneering research on this topic was done in the mid-20th century by Polish historian Szymon Datner. More recent research into this has been carried out by German historian Jochen Böhler. Tomasz Sudoł, writing in 2011, noted that the topic of German atrocities committed against Polish prisoners of war is still an understudied field with a number of questions waiting to be properly researched.

== See also ==
- Soviet atrocities committed against prisoners of war during World War II
  - German atrocities committed against Soviet prisoners of war
- The Holocaust in the Soviet Union
- Katyn massacre
- Myth of the clean Wehrmacht
- Nazi crimes against the Polish nation
- Prisoners of war in World War II
- War crimes in occupied Poland during World War II
- German crimes during the September Campaign
