= Ciepielów massacre =

War crime in Poland, 8 September 1939

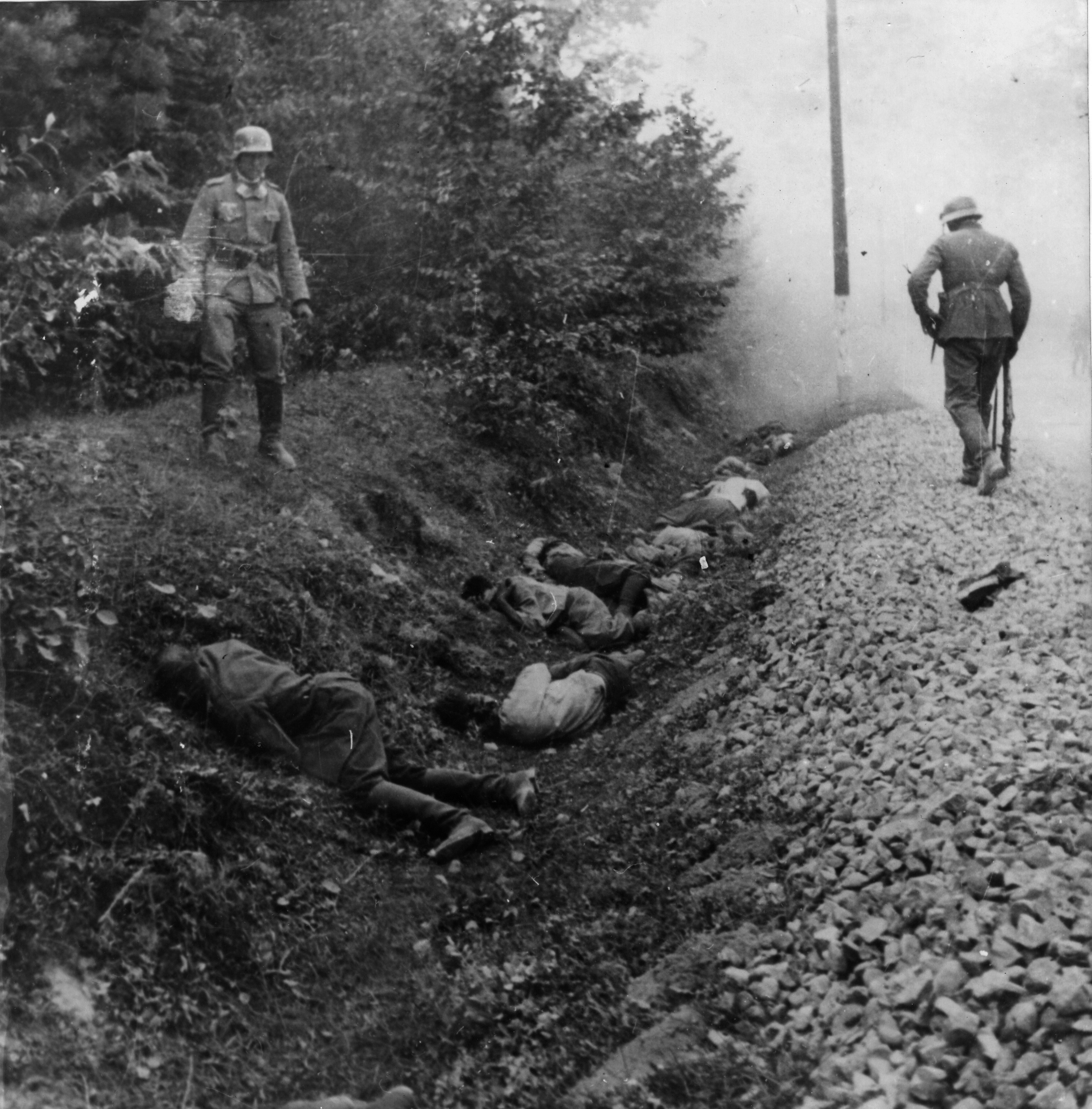
- Polish POWs murdered by the Wehrmacht

- Location within Poland
- Location: Dąbrowa near Ciepielów, Poland; 51°13′21″N 21°35′45″E
- Date: September 9, 1939
- Incident type: Mass murder
- Perpetrators: German Army (Wehrmacht); 29th Motorized Infantry Division: Walter Wessel
- Victims: Approximately 300 Polish prisoners of war from the Polish Upper Silesian 74th Infantry Regiment
- Documentation: Photos and memoirs of anonymous German soldier
- Memorials: Commemoration event in Cieielów on anniversary Recorded on Tomb of the Unknown Soldier in Warsaw

The Ciepielów massacre [t͡ɕɛˈpjɛluf] that took place on 8 September 1939 was one of the largest and most documented war crimes of the German Wehrmacht during its invasion of Poland. On that day, the forest near Ciepielów was the site of a mass murder of Polish prisoners of war from the Polish Upper Silesian 74th Infantry Regiment. The massacre was carried out by soldiers from the German Army's 15th Motorized Infantry Regiment, 29th Motorized Infantry Division, under the command of Colonel Walter Wessel.

This event has been described as the "most infamous" war crime committed by Germans during their invasion of Poland. The number of dead has commonly been estimated at 300, although more recent research suggests a revised number of "over 250" instead.

== Background ==
=== Tactical situation ===
Around 8 September, during the invasion of Poland that began on 1 September, the German 15th Motorized Infantry Regiment of the 29th Motorized Infantry Division, German 10th Army, engaged the remnants of the Polish Upper Silesian 74th Infantry Regiment of the Polish 7th Infantry Division, Kraków Army, and took a number of prisoners of war. At that time, the Polish forces in the region were already in retreat, with the 7th Division being effectively destroyed on 3–4 September around Częstochowa, with its commander, General Janusz Gąsiorowski, taken prisoner. The 74th Infantry Regiment was commanded by Colonel Wacław Wilniewczyc. The regiment is also considered to have suffered heavy losses during the Częstochowa battle, with some sources describing it as effectively destroyed.

=== Context of German war crimes ===
During the invasion of Poland, the Wehrmacht committed a number of war crimes, including several prisoner-of-war massacres, of which Ciepielów became the most widely known. Reasons suggested by some historians for the massacres include contempt for Poles and Polish soldiers, encouraged by Nazi propaganda, which described them as German-hating Untermenschen, and lack of preparation, resources, and will to secure surrendered Polish soldiers. However, many other western historians point to plans formulated by the German General Staff, prior to the invasion, which authorized the SS to carry out security tasks on behalf of the army that included the imprisonment or execution of Polish citizens, whether Jewish or gentile. On 19 September, shortly after the onset of hostilities, Franz Halder, Chief of the German General Staff, noted in his diary that he had received information from Reinhard Heydrich. The SS were beginning their campaign to "clean house" in Poland of Jews, intelligentsia, Catholic clergy, and the aristocracy. Halder was aware of the murders but did not object. He dismissed the crimes as aberrations and refused one general's request to pursue the SS and police perpetrators. Further, German officers often treated Polish soldiers of disorganized units captured behind German lines as partisans, not as regular soldiers, and felt justified in ordering their summary execution. This led to several dozen executions of groups of Polish soldiers, in addition to a hard-to-estimate number of murders of individual soldiers.

The largest massacres of prisoners of war by the Germans, (in addition to Ciepielów), took place in Katowice (the Katowice massacre; approximately 80 fatalities), Majdan Wielki (the Majdan Wielki massacre; approximately 42 fatalities), Serock (the Serock massacre; approximately 80 fatalities), Sochaczew (the Sochaczew massacre; approximately 50 fatalities), Szczucin (the Szczucin massacre; approximately 40 fatalities), Zakroczym (the Zakroczym massacre; approximately 60 fatalities), and Zambrów (the Zambrów massacre; approximately 200 fatalities).

== Massacre ==
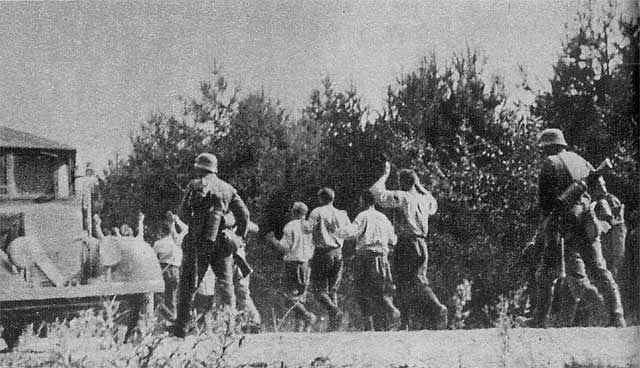
Polish POWs and German soldiers shortly before the massacre

The massacre was documented in photos and memoirs of an anonymous German soldier, who witnessed an engagement in which Polish soldiers ambushed and killed over a dozen German soldiers from the 11th Company of the 15th Regiment, including the company's commander, Captain Lewinsky. A number of Polish soldiers were then captured, and Oberst (Colonel) Walter Wessel, commander of the German 15th Motorized Infantry Regiment, 29th Motorized Infantry Division, ordered them stripped of their uniforms and declared partisans and had them taken to a secluded location near the village of Dąbrowa (itself near a larger village of Ciepielów), where they were shot. The anonymous author of the memoirs arrived at that location after hearing gunfire, and counted approximately 300 bodies in a roadside ditch. Those documents were received by the Polish Military Mission in Germany in West Berlin in 1950.

== Number of victims ==
In 1970 the Main Commission for Investigation of German Crimes in Poland (Główna Komisja Badania Zbrodni Niemieckich w Polsce) asked the German Central Office of the State Justice Administrations for the Investigation of National Socialist Crimes (Zentrale Stelle der Landesjustizverwaltungen zur Aufklärung nationalsozialistischer Verbrechen) to investigate the case further. The German Office stated that Colonel Wessel had died in Italy in 1943, that interviews of other surviving soldiers were inconclusive, and concluded with a statement that the battle of Ciepielów resulted in 13 German and 250 Polish casualties.

Some other German accounts have given estimates of the prisoners killed in this massacre as 250 or 150, the second account also suggests that an unknown number of further executions took place on 9 September.

As of 2019, the Polish Commission successor, Institute of National Remembrance – Commission for the Prosecution of Crimes against the Polish Nation (Instytut Pamięci Narodowej – Komisja Ścigania Zbrodni przeciwko Narodowi Polskiemu) states that the number of victims of the massacre is "at least 250". It also states that German soldiers from the 29th Division murdered dozens of other individuals, including prisoners of war, as well as Polish and Polish Jewish civilians, in Ciepielów and its vicinity on 8 September and subsequent days.

While the majority of Polish sources set the number of the prisoner of war killed in this event at 300 (for example, this is the description given by 2019 Internet edition of the Polish PWN Encyklopedia), Polish historian Tomasz Sudoł has said that number, while commonly accepted and repeated in Polish historiography, is likely exaggerated as the account of the anonymous German diarist and the bodies he observed did not necessarily all come from the execution of prisoners of war; some might have fallen during the battle itself. Germans also carried out a number of other prisoner of war executions at that time and in the vicinity of Ciepielów, such as the murder of prisoners at Cukrówka, and the victims of executions at multiple sites might have been buried in the same place, and the matter is further confused by the fact that post-war exhumations and reburial were done in haste and without sufficient diligence. Finally, Sudoł mentions that some of the photographs associated with the event may in fact come from those similar events that happened in nearby locales and were just grouped in the same category.

== Commemoration ==
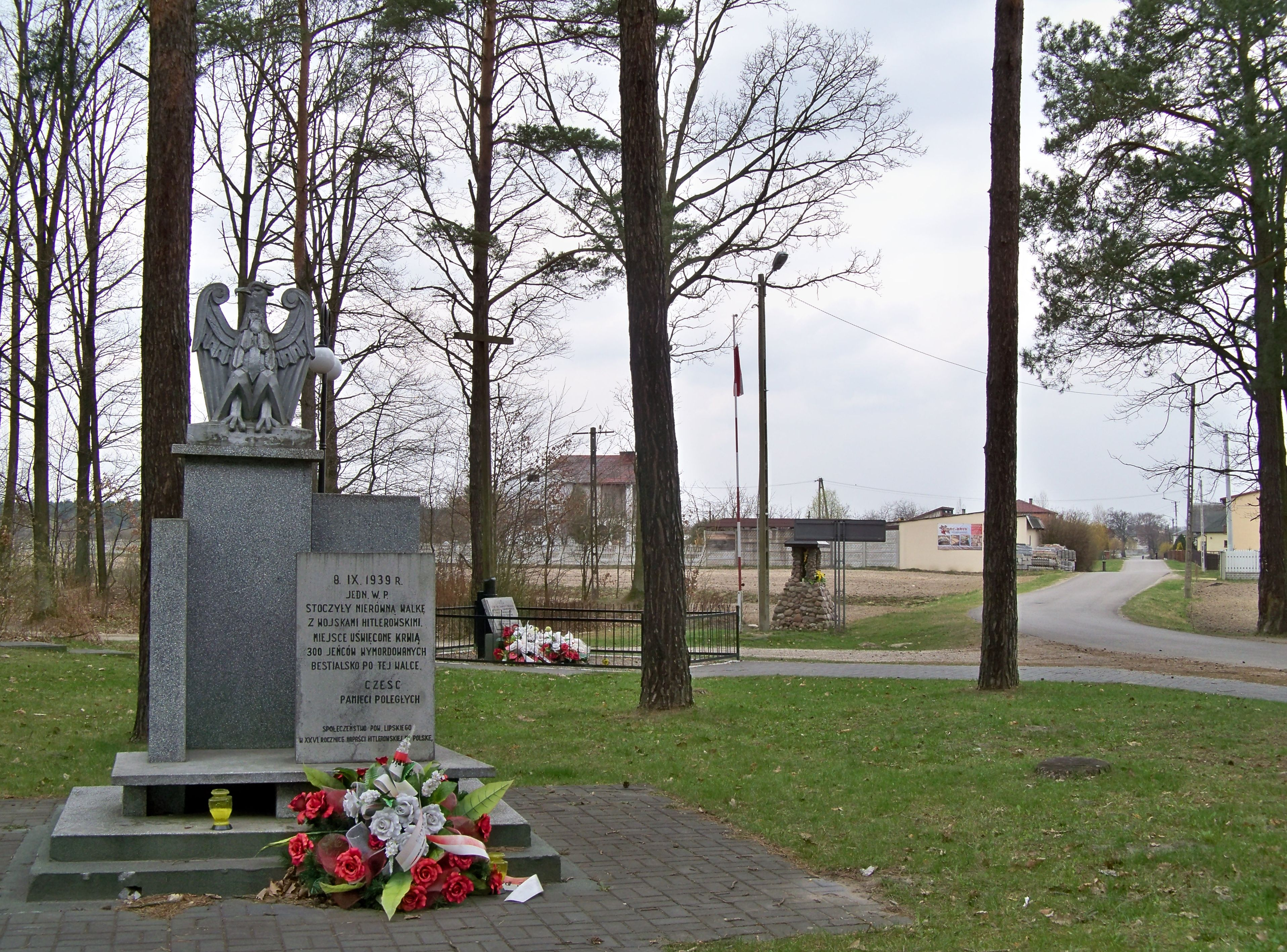
Memorial in Dąbrowa

This event became known as the most infamous war crime committed by Germans during their invasion of Poland, or the most infamous war crime committed by Germans whose victims were regular Polish soldiers.

For many years, on the anniversary of the massacre, the village of Ciepielów has organised a commemoration event, centered on the monument to the victims. The commemoration activities include concerts of patriotic songs including the anthem of Poland, a religious field mass, flower bouquet offering and a speech by the wójt of the Gmina Ciepielów, award ceremony for individuals promoting local history, and the public distribution of the traditional military pea soup.

The massacre is also recorded on the Tomb of the Unknown Soldier in Warsaw, dedicated to the unknown soldiers who have given their lives for Poland. It is one of many such national tombs of unknowns that were erected after World War I, and the most important such monument in Poland.

== See also ==
- Częstochowa massacre
- Stary Ciepielów and Rekówka massacre
- Katyn massacre (by the Soviets)
- List of massacres in Poland
- Nazi crimes against the Polish nation
