= Zambrów massacre =

Crime of the German occupiers

Coordinates: 52°59′12″N 22°14′53″E

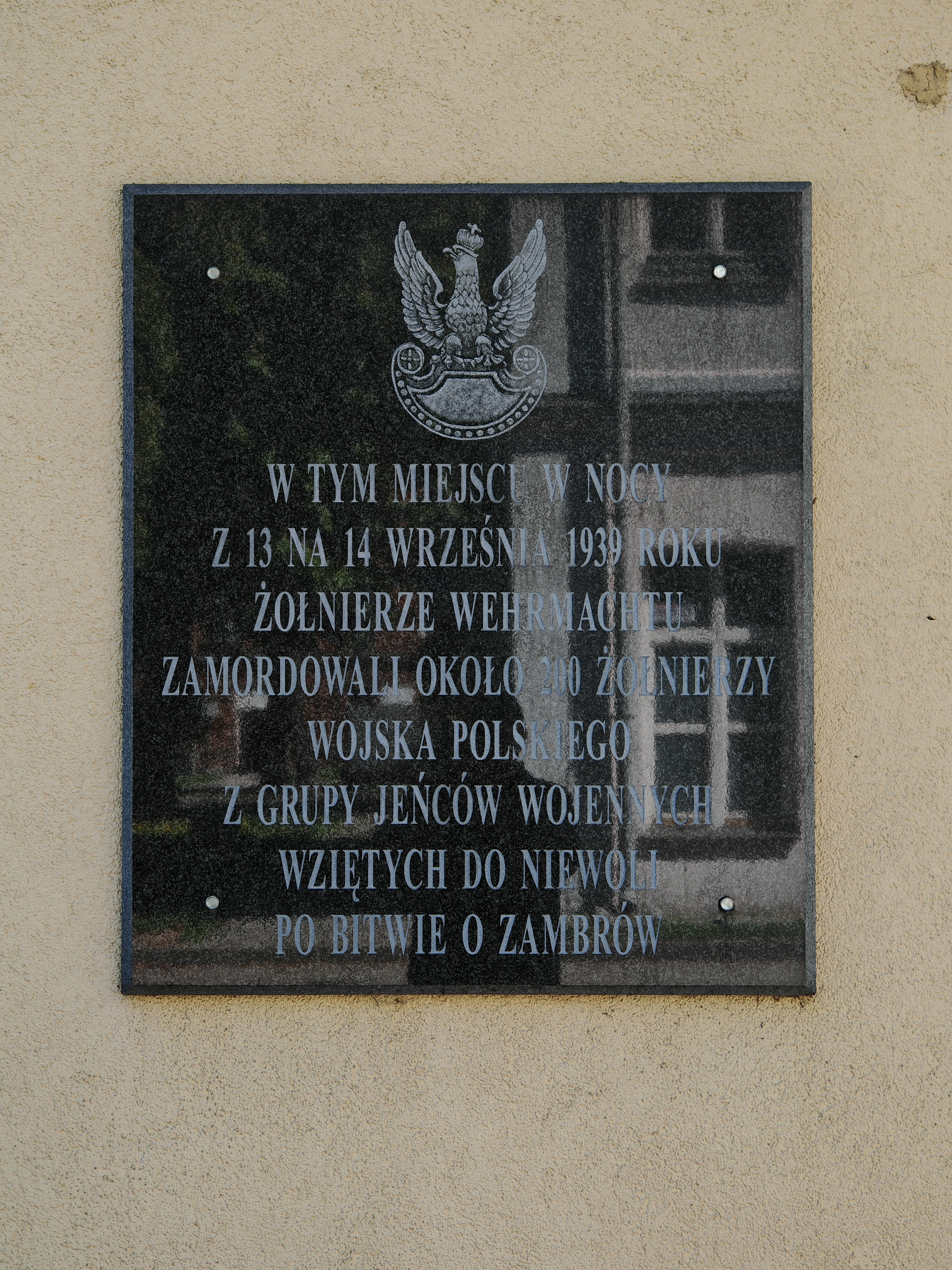
Memorial plaque at the place of the massacre

The Zambrów massacre was a war crime that took place on the night of 13–14 September 1939. It was one of the major war crimes of the Wehrmacht during the invasion of Poland. During that night, the makeshift prisoner-of-war camp in Zambrów was disturbed by a number of panicked horses, and more than 200 Polish soldiers, trying to move out of their way, were gunned down by German sentries. Some witnesses later said the horses had been purposely released into the camp by the German sentries, who used the incident as a pretext to massacre the prisoners.

== Background ==
=== Tactical situation ===
The Battle of Zambrów, lasting from 11 to 13 September 1939, involved units of Polish General Czesław Młot-Fijałkowski's Special Operation Group "Narew", particularly the Polish 18th Infantry Division under command of Colonel Stefan Kossecki, facing an offensive by the German XIX Army Corps under General Heinz Guderian and the XXI Army Corps under General Nikolaus von Falkenhorst. The Polish forces were pushed back, and in the process the 18th Infantry Division sustained heavy losses and was effectively destroyed, with several thousands soldiers being taken prisoner-of-war.

=== Context of German war crimes ===
During the 1939 invasion of Poland, Germany's Wehrmacht committed a number of war crimes, including several prisoner-of-war massacres. Reasons for the prisoner-of-war massacres, suggested by historians, include contempt for Poles and Polish soldiers, encouraged by Nazi propaganda, which described them as German-hating Untermenschen; and lack of preparation, resources, and will to secure surrendered Polish soldiers. However, many other western historians point to plans formulated by the German General Staff, prior to the invasion, which authorized the SS to carry out security tasks on behalf of the army that included the imprisonment or execution of Polish citizens, whether Jewish or gentile. On 19 September, shortly after the onset of hostilities, Franz Halder, Chief of the German General Staff, noted in his diary that he had received information from Reinhard Heydrich. The SS were beginning their campaign to "clean house" in Poland of Jews, intelligentsia, Catholic clergy, and the aristocracy. Halder was aware of the murders but did not object. He dismissed the crimes as aberrations and refused one general's request to pursue the SS and police perpetrators. Further, German officers often treated Polish soldiers of disorganized units captured behind German lines as partisans, not as regular soldiers, and felt justified in ordering their summary execution. This led to several dozen executions of groups of Polish soldiers, in addition to a hard-to-estimate number of murders of individual soldiers.

In addition to the Zambrów event, there were other instances when German military units killed Polish prisoners of war. They include those at Ciepielów (the Ciepielów massacre, estimated at 250 or more fatalities), Katowice (the Katowice massacre, some 80 fatalities), Majdan Wielki (the Majdan Wielki massacre, some 42 fatalities), Serock (the Serock massacre, some 80 fatalities), Sochaczew (the Sochaczew massacre, some 50 fatalities), Szczucin (the Szczucin massacre, some 40 fatalities), and Zakroczym (the Massacre in Zakroczym, some 60 fatalities).

The Soviets, who also occupied portions of Poland during this period, undertook the systematic mass executions of Polish military officers and intelligentsia. Of the estimated 22,000 prisoners murdered in the Katyn forest in Russia, about 8,000 were Polish military officers imprisoned during the 1939 Soviet invasion of Poland, another 6,000 were police officers, and the rest were Polish intelligentsia.

== The massacre ==
By 13 September 1939, the makeshift prisoner-of-war camp in Zambrów, at the garrison buildings of the Polish 71st Infantry Regiment, held 4,000 to 5,000 Polish prisoners of war. Kept next to the camp were some horses. The German guard detail had been reinforced with a number of cars mounted with machine guns. On the night of 13–14 September 1939 the German sentries issued an extra warning, stating that any prisoners who moved during the night would be shot.

Later that night, some panicked horses made their way into the camp; and when Polish soldiers tried to move out of their way to avoid being trampled, German sentries opened fire. The camp was sprayed with machine-gun and small-arms fire for about 10 minutes, until some German soldiers were struck by friendly fire. The Polish soldiers were still not allowed to move; even requests of help for the wounded were denied.

At daybreak, the count showed some 200 Polish fatalities and 100 wounded (another estimate gave the number of fatalities as 250). Many witnesses among the prisoners of war believed the incident had been created on purpose by the German sentries, the horses panicking on being blinded by the sentries' searchlights.

The Zambrów massacre was allegedly one of the worst German war crimes of this type during the September 1939 invasion of Poland.
