= Katowice massacre =

War crime involving execution of 80 Polish defenders by German soldiers

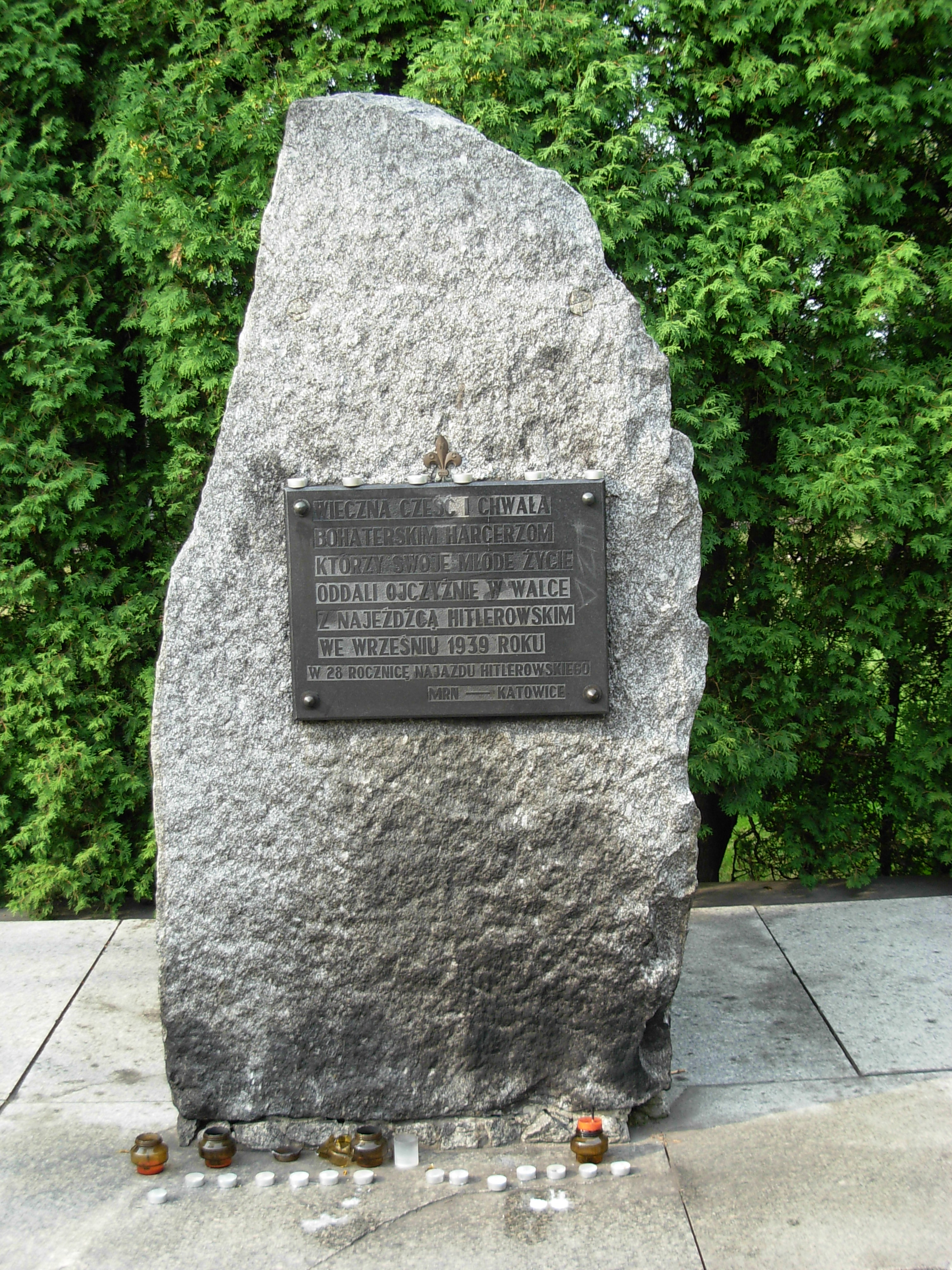
A memorial for the Polish Boy Scouts who died defending Katowice in September 1939. A number of fallen scouts were victims of the executions of 4 September 1939.

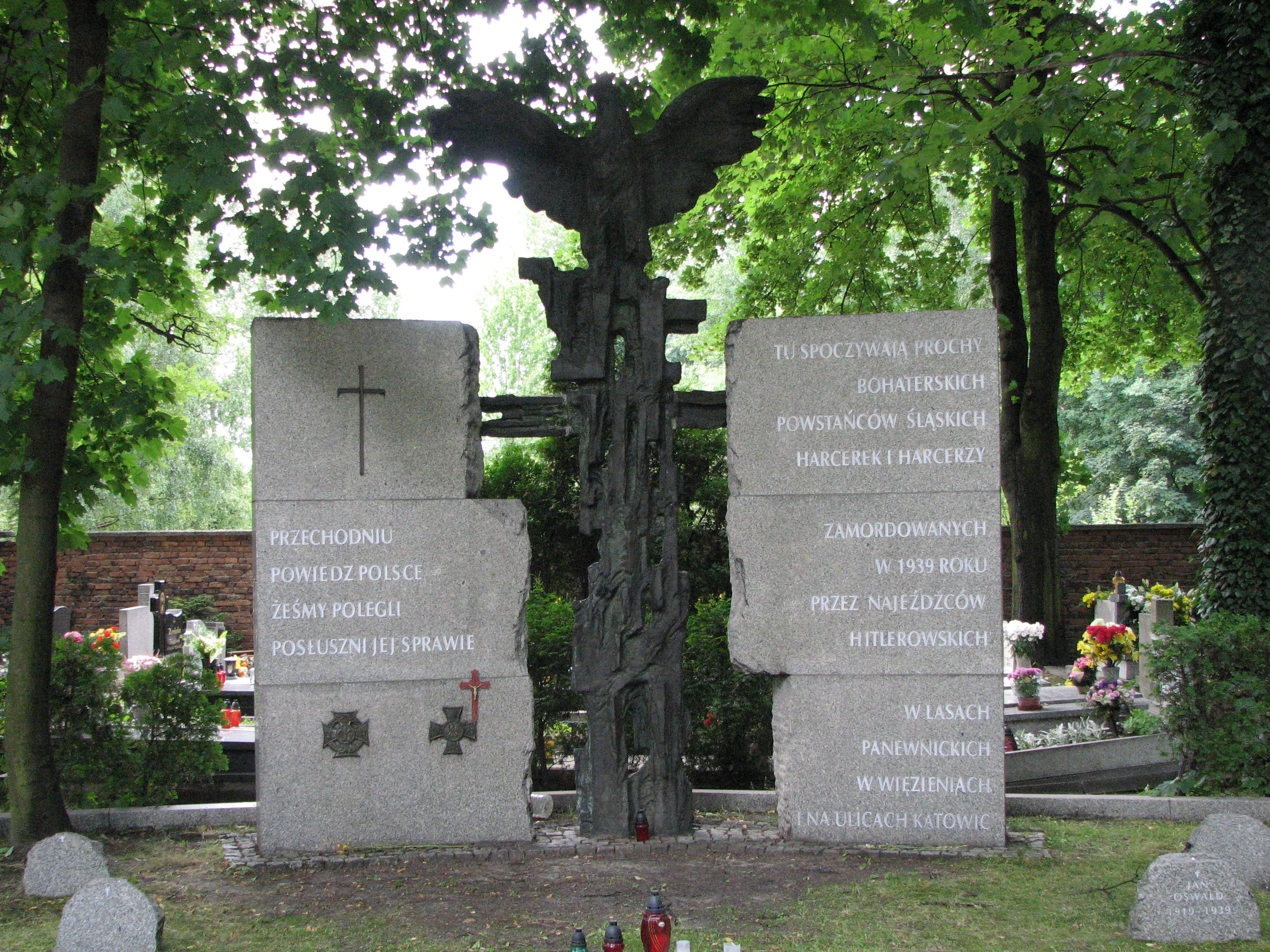
Monument to the Defenders of Katowice, described on the inscription as "Silesian insurgents, Boy and Girl scouts, murdered in 1939 by the Hitlerite invaders, in forests, streets and prisons of Katowice"

The Katowice massacre or the Bloody Monday in Katowice that took place on 4 September 1939 was one of the largest war crimes of the Wehrmacht during its invasion of Poland. On that day, German Wehrmacht soldiers aided by the Freikorps militia executed about 80 of the Polish defenders of the city. Those defenders were self-defense militia volunteers, including former Silesian Insurgents, Polish Boy and Girl Scouts, and possibly a number of Polish soldier stragglers from retreating Polish regular forces who joined the militia.

== Defense of Katowice ==
The town of Katowice, close to the Polish-German border, was not defended by the Polish Army during the battle of the border, with regular army and some support formation abandoning it by 2 September. The German forces which took it on 4 September had only to deal with some remaining irregular Polish self-defense militia units that either refused to evacuate or were unaware of the orders from the Polish army command. Germans reported being shot at in a number of incidents, suffering about 15 total fatalities in the process of securing the city. The most notable incidents involved the defense of the Silesian Insurgent House as well as a group of Polish Boy and Girl Scouts shooting Germans from the vantage point of the Parachute Tower Katowice. The defense of the Tower became a remembered incident of the defense of Katowice.

== The massacre ==
A number of Polish individuals were arrested following the German capture of the city. While some were reported to have been released, others were taken to the German consulate and executed shortly afterward by a firing squad. Those executed included the approximately 30 surviving defenders of the Silesian Insurgent House. Some estimates suggested that the number of fatalities in Katowice might have been as high as 750. However, the Polish Institute of National Remembrance (IPN) which investigated this incident noted that about 150 Poles were killed in Katowice on that day in fighting and subsequent executions, and that it is impossible to precisely determine the total number of fatalities, nor to separate exactly the number of fatalities that occurred as a result of fighting and those that died in later executions. The number of individuals executed by the firing squad is estimated at 80 fatalities.

The victims of the execution consisted not only of those who were arrested for actively fighting German soldiers and surrendered, but also of individuals simply wearing scouting or militia uniform, people in possession of firearms or ammunition, or civilians selected by German sympathizers as persons of special interest. Only individuals who had documents identifying them as soldiers in the Polish Army were spared and treated according to the prisoners of war conventions. The victims of the executions included at least one woman and fourteen boy scouts aged approximately 14 years old. Among the victims was a former insurgent and later councilman of the Katowice city council, and one of the militia leaders Nikodem Renc . An uncertain number of people, at least a dozen, were executed in Katowice in the following days in various incidents.

Polish historian Tomasz Sudoł noted that the executions were carried out by soldiers from the 8th Panzer Division, though the IPN findings suggest that most executions were carried out or at least aided by members of the German irregular volunteer militia Freikorps (Freikorps Ebbinghaus) and notes that the regular German units in that city came not only from the 8th Panzer Division, but also from the 239 Infantry Division and the 28th Jäger Division. The Einsatzgruppen units which arrived at that time or within a few days were also active in Katowice and Silesia and one of their standing orders was to summarily execute all identified former Polish insurgents. The Polish Institute of National Remembrance concluded that while it is no longer possible to identify most victims and perpetrators, the main responsibility for the massacre rests in the hands of high ranking German officials like Heinrich Himmler and Udo von Woyrsch.

The largest massacres of Polish prisoners of war by the Germans (in addition to Katowice) took place in Ciepielów (the Ciepielów massacre, estimated at 250 or more fatalities), Majdan Wielki (the Majdan Wielki massacre; approximately 42 fatalities), Serock (the Serock massacre; approximately 80 fatalities), Sochaczew (the Sochaczew massacre; approximately 50 fatalities), Szczucin (the Szczucin massacre; approximately 40 fatalities), Zakroczym (the Massacre in Zakroczym; approximately 60 fatalities), and Zambrów (the Zambrów massacre; approximately 200 fatalities).

== Remembrance ==
In 1961 the Defenders of Katowice Monument was unveiled. On 4 September 1983 a September Scouts Monument in Katowice was unveiled in Katowice, commemorating the Polish Boy Scouts fallen during the defense of Katowice. There are also several memorial plaques as well as graves, including mass graves, dedicated to the victims of the defense of Katowice including those killed in the executions. During anniversaries of World War II a number of those monuments are visited by government officials and activists.

== See also ==
- Częstochowa massacre – another large massacre in Silesia carried out by Germans between September 4 and 6
- Great Synagogue in Katowice – major landmark in Katowice, burned by the Germans either on September 4 or 8 (sources vary)
