= Jewish Cemetery, Katowice =

Jewish cemetery in Katowice, Poland

Jewish Cemetery in Katowice
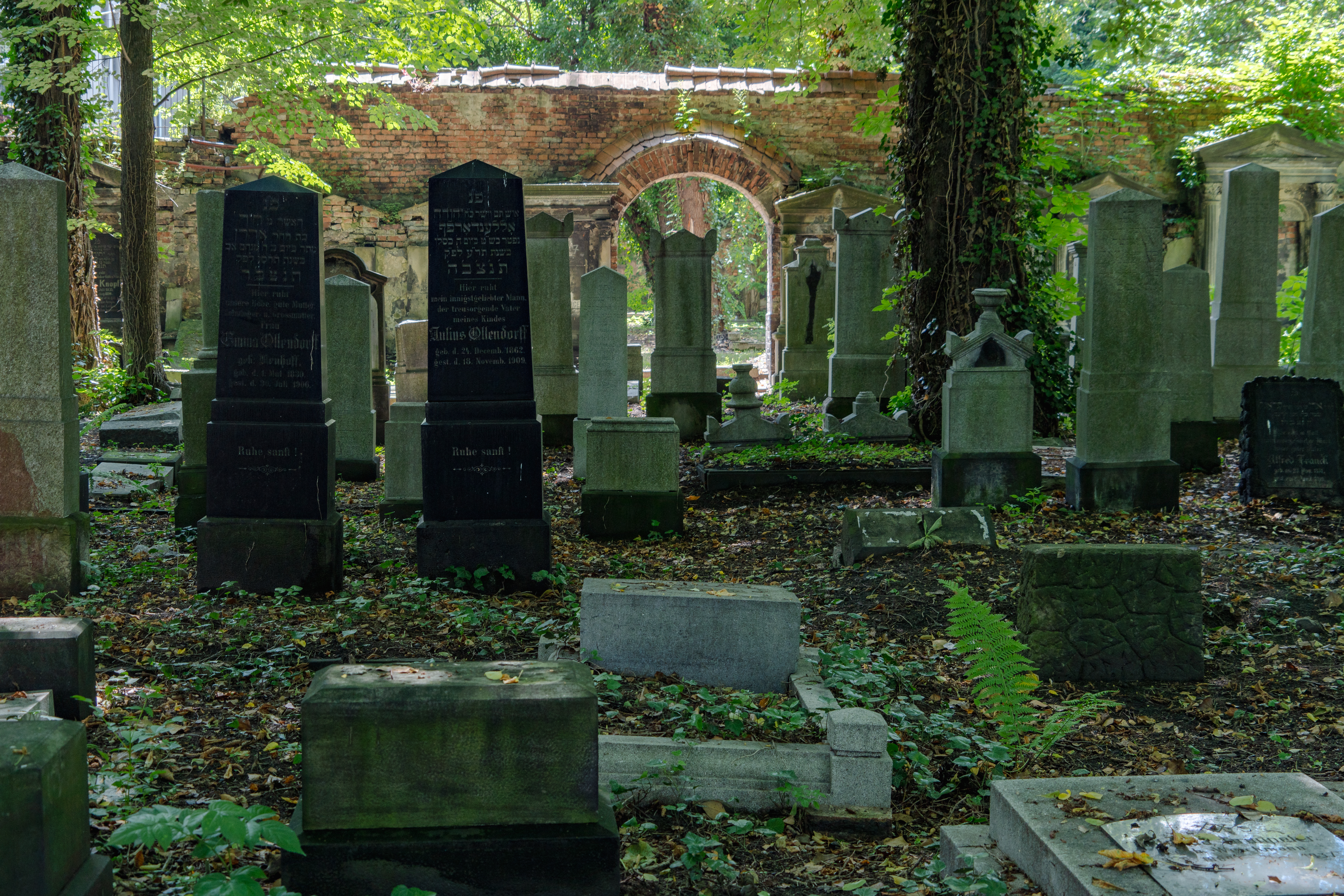
- Jewish cemetery in Katowice
- Interactive map of Jewish Cemetery in Katowice

Details
- Established: 1869
- Location: 16 Kozielska Street, Śródmieście, Katowice
- Country: Poland
- Coordinates: 50°15′21″N 19°0′29″E
- Type: Religious cemetery
- Owned by: Jewish Community of Katowice
- Size: 1.1 ha
- No. of graves: 949–1400

Jewish Cemetery in Katowice is an active Jewish cemetery located at 16 Kozielska Street in the Śródmieście district of Katowice, Poland.

== History ==
In 1868, the Jewish community of Katowice purchased land from Josef Ludnowski for 480 thalers for the establishment of a new cemetery. The property comprised three morgs of land. The cemetery was officially opened in 1869. Its area was expanded in 1927.

During World War II, German forces devastated the cemetery and brought the bodies of murdered defenders of Katowice to be buried there. After the war, the cemetery grounds were further enlarged in 1945.

The cemetery is surrounded by a brick wall. On its 1.1-hectare site, approximately 1,400 tombstones have been preserved, although some sources report that only 949 survive.

The first person buried in the cemetery was four-year-old Carl Munzer. Members of prominent local Jewish families, including the Goldstein, Glaser and Schalscha families, are interred there. In 1890 the funeral house was rebuilt, and a building for the Burial Society (Chevra Kadisha), including accommodation for the caretaker, was constructed nearby.

A monument commemorating the victims of the Holocaust stands within the cemetery grounds. It takes the form of a broad altar. Polish and Hebrew inscriptions are placed on stelae crowning the mensa. On the mensa are plaques commemorating six families murdered by the Germans during World War II. Two standing memorial lamps are also located on the structure.

== Gallery ==
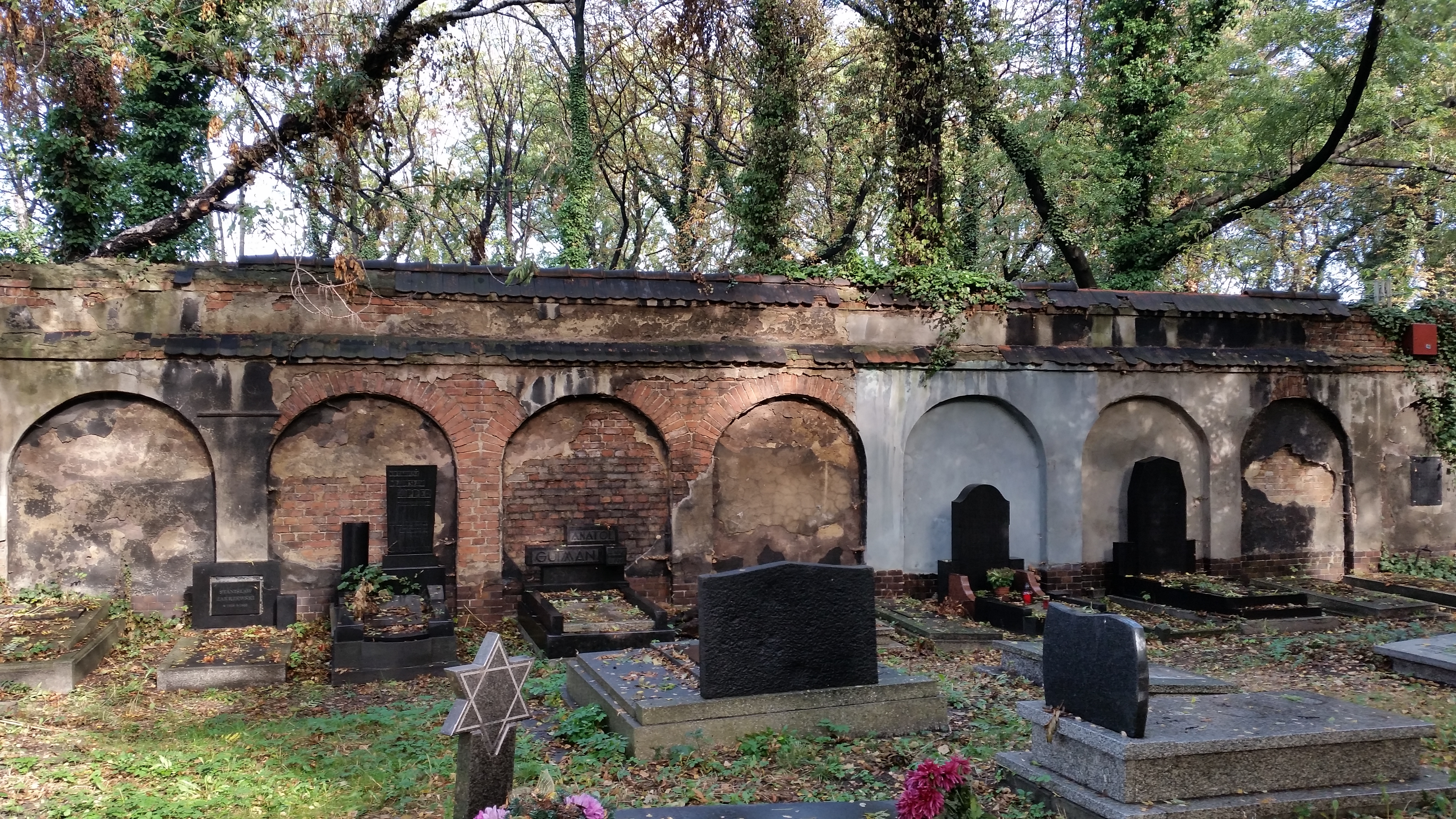
Brick enclosure (2015)

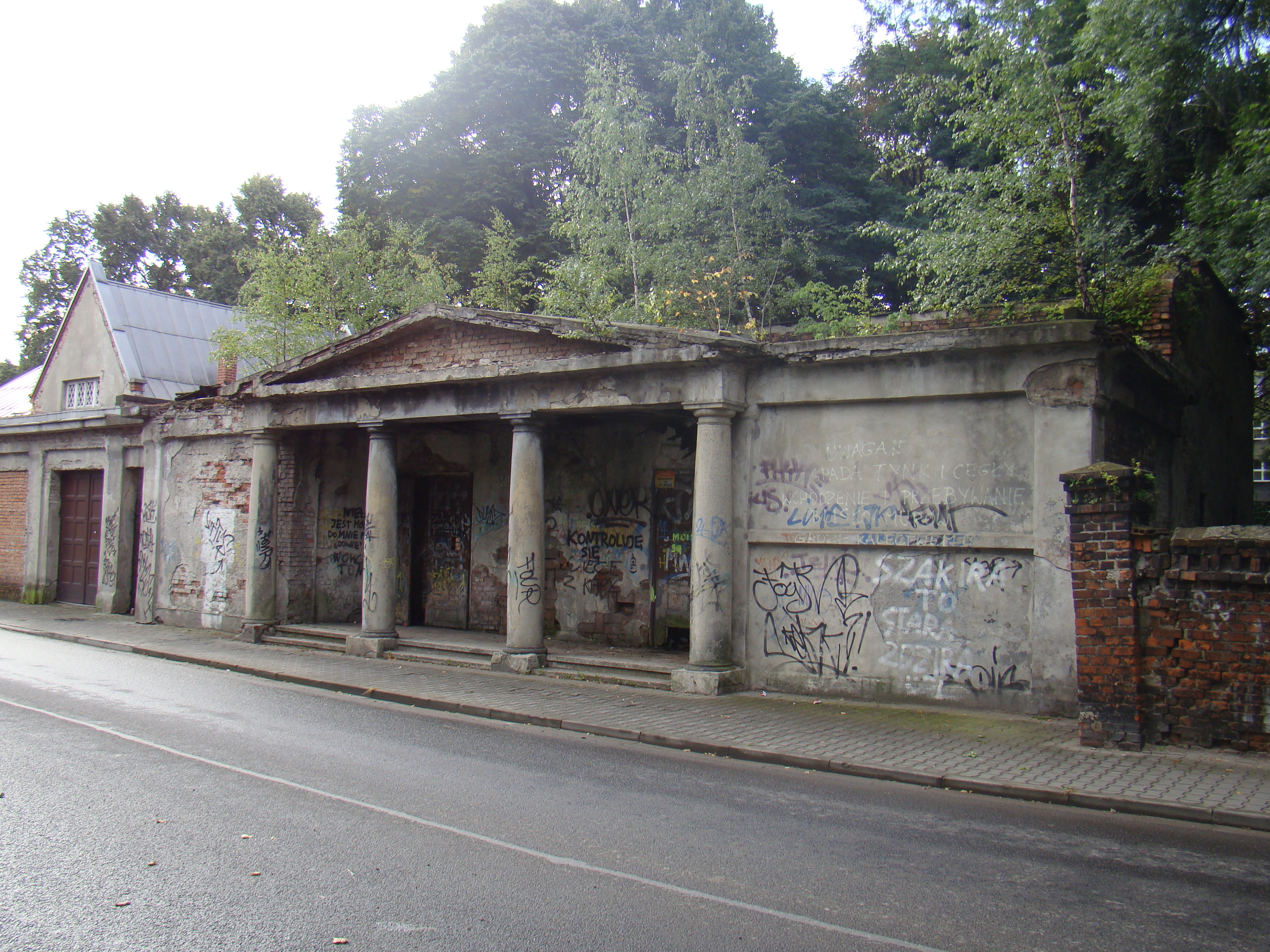
Funeral house (2014)

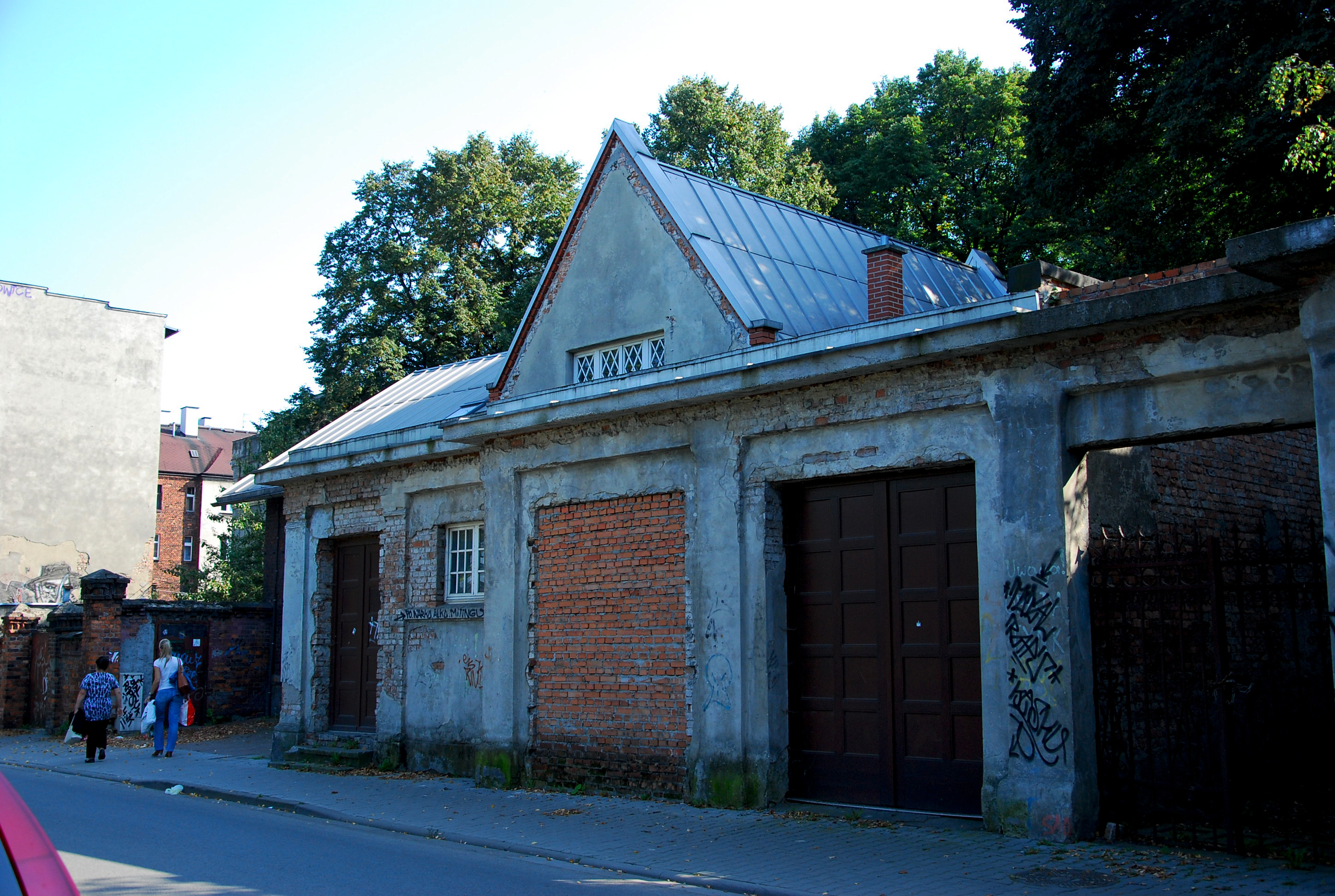
Burial Society building (2014)

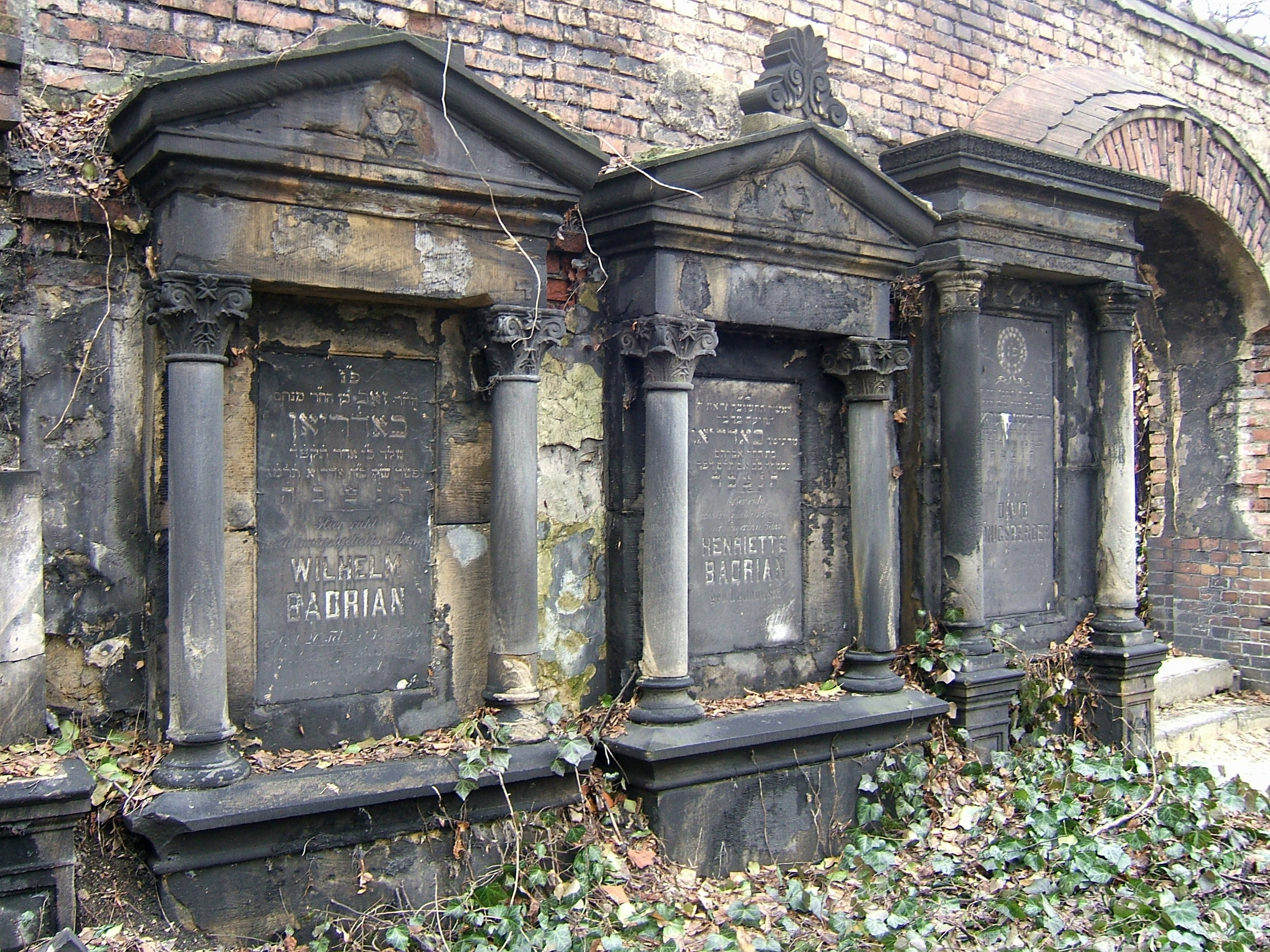
Tombstones along the wall

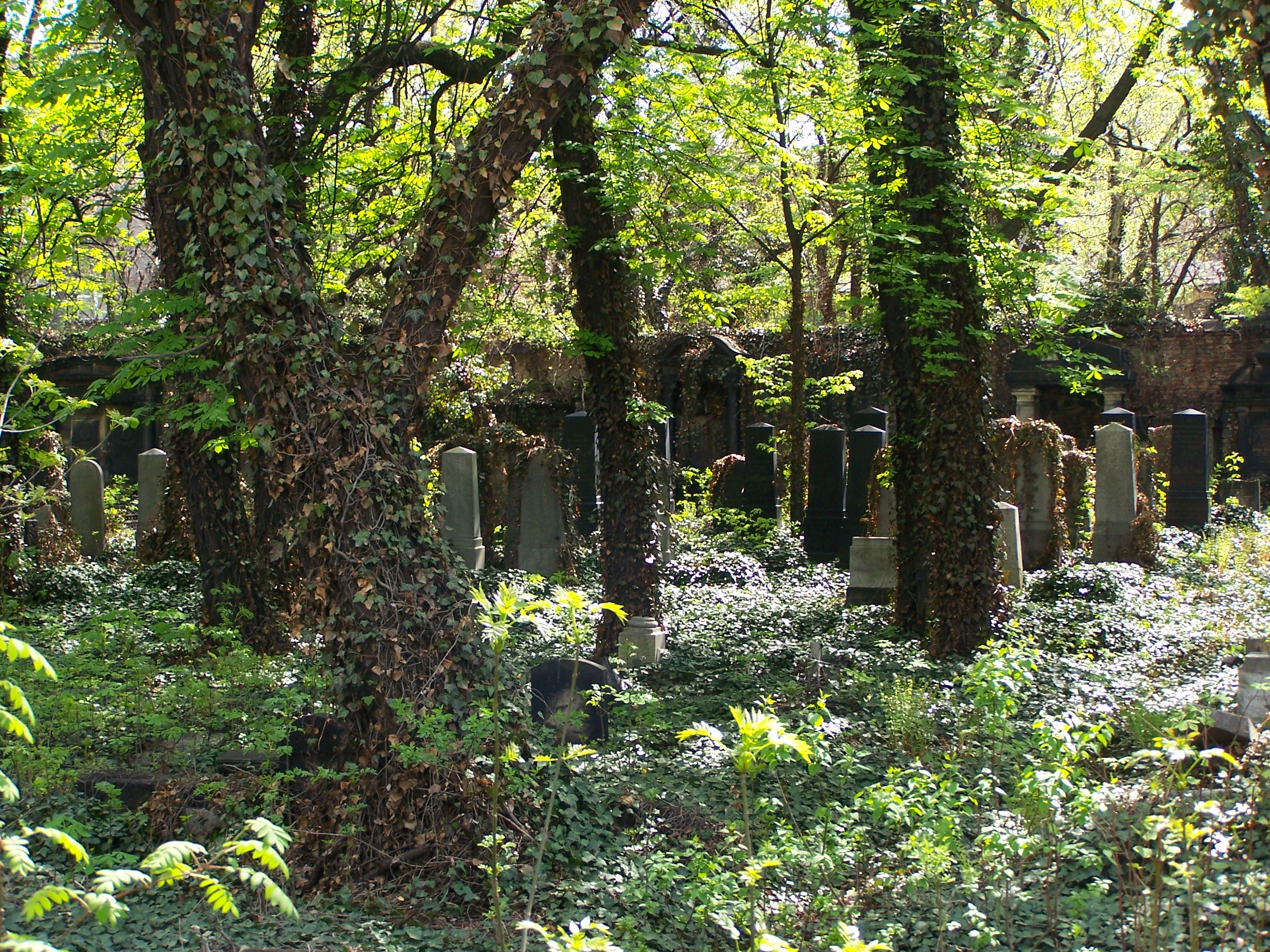
Cemetery grounds (2006)

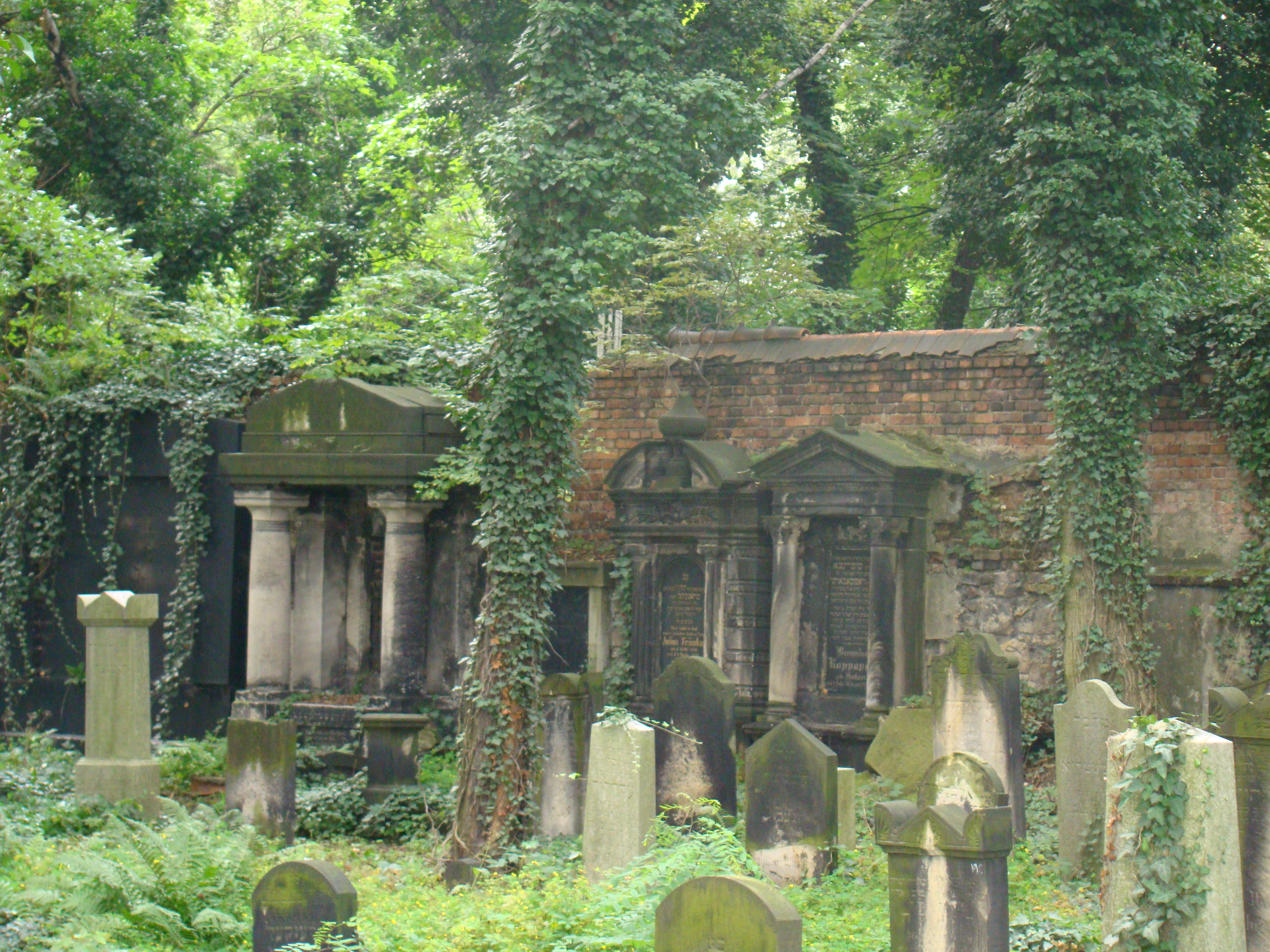
Cemetery grounds (2014)

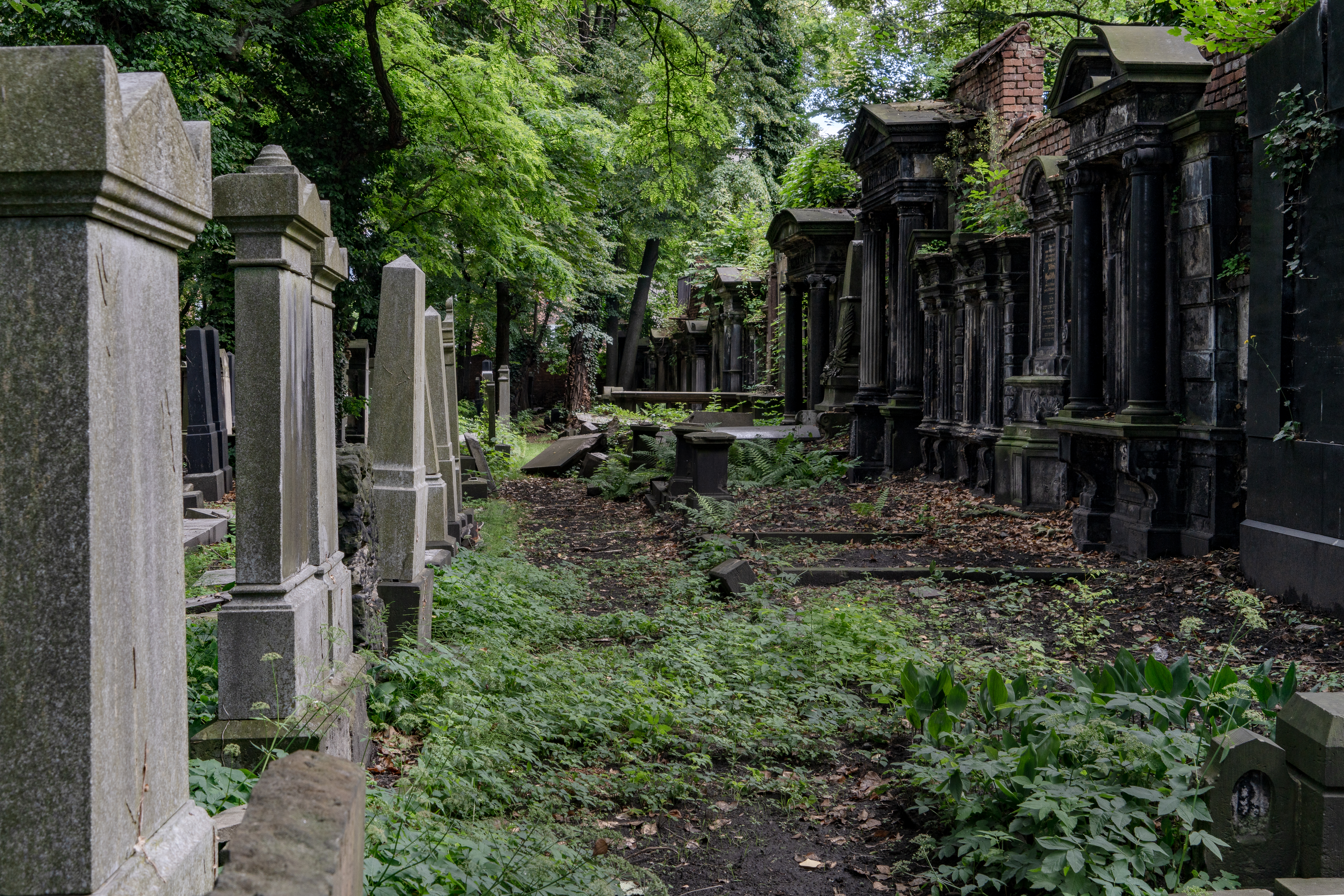
Cemetery grounds (2023)

== Heritage status ==
The cemetery is listed in the register of historic monuments of the Silesian Voivodeship as:

- No. A/1414/90 of 29 October 1990 — Jewish Cemetery at 16 Kozielska Street, Katowice.

The protected area includes the cemetery grounds, tombstones, the funeral house, the Burial Society building, and the brick enclosure with its wrought-iron gate.
