= Dąbrowa, Lipsko County =

Dąbrowa
- Village
- Location within Poland
- Coordinates: 51°13′24″N 21°35′00″E
- Country: Poland
- Voivodeship: Masovian
- County: Lipsko
- Gmina: Ciepielów

Dąbrowa [dɔmˈbrɔva] is a village in the administrative district of Gmina Ciepielów, within Lipsko County, Masovian Voivodeship, in east-central Poland.
