= Podgaje massacre =

1945 massacre of Polish POWs

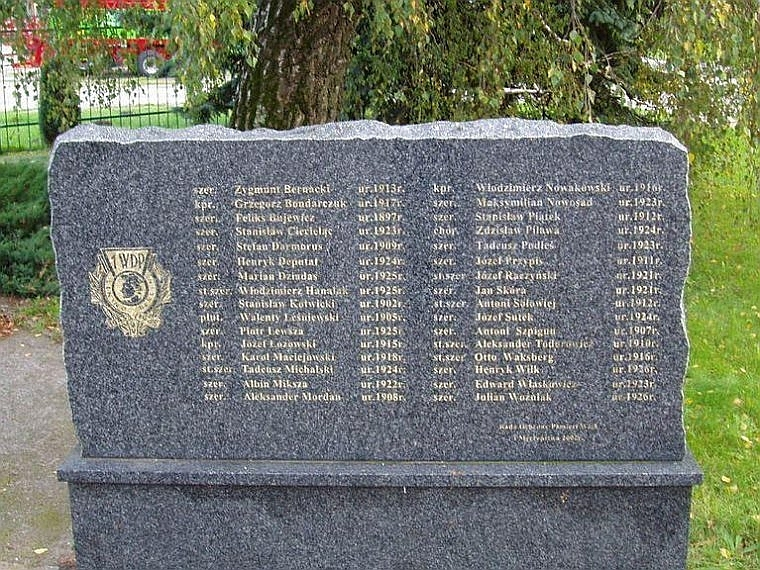
Podgaje memorial

The Podgaje massacre refers to the mass murder of Polish People's Armies POWs, who were captured in January 1945 by the Waffen SS. The massacre took place in the village of Podgaje during the night of 31 January, during which approximately 160–210 POWs of the 4th Company, 3rd Infantry Regiment, of the 1st Tadeusz Kościuszko Infantry Division were executed. The murders were most likely committed by the 48th Dutch SS Grenadier regiment and/or the Latvian 15th Waffen Grenadier Division of the SS.

While some older sources claimed that 32 of the victims were burned alive, newer research does not support that conclusion.

The Polish soldiers were captured during the First Polish Army's attempt of breaking through the German defensive fortifications, known as the Pomeranian Wall.

The Podgaje massacre is commemorated on the Tomb of the Unknown Soldier, Warsaw, with the inscription "PODGAJE 31 I 1945".

The event was fictionalized in the Polish 1979 movie Elegia.
