= Podgaje, Greater Poland Voivodeship =

Podgaje
- Village
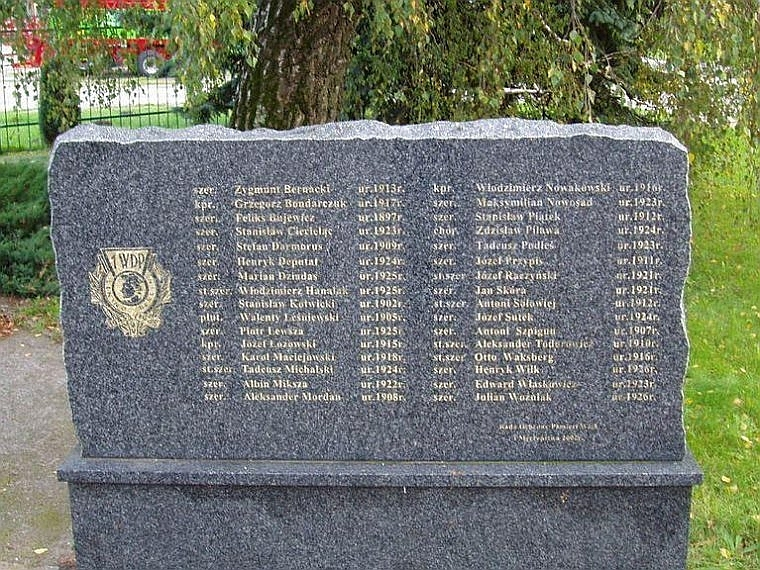
- Memorial to Polish POWs, victims of the German-perpetrated Podgaje massacre

- Location within Poland
- Coordinates: 53°28′N 16°53′E
- Country: Poland
- Voivodeship: Greater Poland
- County: Złotów
- Gmina: Okonek
- Population: 370
- Time zone: UTC+1 (CET)
  - Summer (DST): UTC+2 (CEST)
- Vehicle registration: PZL

Podgaje [pɔdˈɡajɛ] is a village in the administrative district of Gmina Okonek, within Złotów County, Greater Poland Voivodeship, in north-central Poland.

== History ==
The territory became a part of the emerging Polish state under its first historic ruler Mieszko I in the 10th century. Following the fragmentation of Poland into smaller duchies, it formed part of the Duchy of Pomerania until 1648, when it fell to Prussia, and from 1871 to 1945 it also formed part of Germany.

The village was a scene of Massacre in Podgaje in January 1945, when Waffen-SS troops murdered 160–210 of Polish Army prisoners-of-war.
