= 74th Infantry Regiment (Poland) =

Polish military unit (1919–1944)

The 74 Upper Silesian Infantry Regiment (Polish 74 Górnośląski Pułk Piechoty) was a Polish military unit. Created during the Greater Poland Uprising, it entered the Polish Army and fought in the Polish-Soviet War and Invasion of Poland. During Operation Tempest of 1944 it was re-created by the Home Army.

== History ==
=== Creation and Polish-Bolshevik War ===
The unit was created under the name of III Regiment of Land Defence (III pułk obrony krajowej) in 1919, as a merger of several battalions of infantry of Greater Poland. Among them were the II battalion of western Poznań, III battalion of Krotoszyn and IV battalion of eastern Poznań. On October 2, 1919, captain Kazimierz Zenkteler was assigned to the unit as the first commanding officer and the unit was renamed to IV Regiment of Land Defence. After Zenkteller was replaced by Lt. Antoni Nieborak, the unit's number was changed to I.

After the end of the Greater Poland Uprising the regiment was reformed, reinforced with HMGs and partially demobilized. It took part in taking over the town of Wieleń from the German administration on January 17, 1920. Again renamed, this time to 1st Reserve Regiment, it was included in the Polish Army and sent to the front of the Polish-Bolshevik War. Almost annihilated during the Battle of Grodno, it was reinforced by Lt. Lisewski it again entered combat during the Battle of the Niemen River, after which it was withdrawn to the training ground in Biedrusko. After the cease-fire and signing of the Riga peace treaty, the regiment was moved to Lubliniec on June 26, 1922.

=== Interwar period ===
During the interbellum, it was one of the Silesian units, with the majority of recruits coming from that region of Poland. After the secret mobilization of March 15, 1939, the regiment - until then held en cadre - was reinforced to 75% of strength and attached to Częstochowa-based Polish 7th Infantry Division. Its task in case of a possible war with Germany was to defend the town of Lubliniec, the westernmost town of Poland, which was surrounded by German territory on three sides. To do that, a line of fortifications and anti-tank obstacles was built around the town and the regiment also manned MG nests along the Polish-German border. On August 24, 1939, another 222 soldiers arrived and the unit was fully reinforced.

=== Second World War ===
After the outbreak of the Invasion of Poland at four o'clock in the morning on September 1, the German 46th Infantry Division crossed the border and headed towards the town. However, the German infantry and tanks were repelled and withdrew, while the task of destroying the fortified city was left to the Luftwaffe. The town was destroyed at 11 am, yet the German tank assault could not follow as the tank barrier surrounded the city. This allowed the cut-off 74th regiment to withdraw to a second line of defence in the village of Kochanowice. Heavy fighting for the town began, with the Polish MGs successfully preventing the German infantry from entering the town. The Germans suffered heavy losses, but their numerical superiority was evident and by 12.30 the Poles were pushed out of the town, with a loss of 177 men (both killed and wounded). It is estimated that the German losses were twice as high, mostly due to minefields and machinegun fire.

During the Operation Tempest of 1944, the unit was recreated by the Radom-Kielce Armia Krajowa Area and assigned to a recreated 7th Infantry Division Orzeł.
