= Szymon Datner =

Polish historian

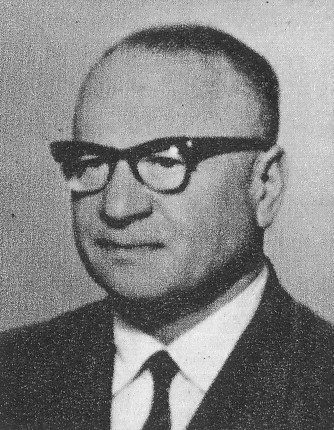
Szymon Datner in 1960s

Szymon Datner (2 February 1902 – 8 December 1989) was a Polish historian, Holocaust survivor and underground operative from Białystok, who was born in Kraków and died in Warsaw. He is best known for his studies of the Nazi war crimes and events of The Holocaust in the Białystok region. His 1946 Walka i zagłada białostockiego ghetta was one of the first studies of the Białystok Ghetto.

== Life to 1945 ==
In 1928 Datner settled in Białystok. Before the outbreak of World War II, he worked as a physical-education teacher at a Jewish secondary school in Białystok. He lived in that city with his wife and two daughters through the Soviet occupation of eastern Poland. After the German attack on the Soviet Union, he was forced with his family into the Białystok Ghetto. On 24 May 1943 he helped smuggle several persons out of the Ghetto. However, his wife and daughters did not survive its liquidation.

== Postwar career ==
After the war, Datner served for two years as head of the Białystok branch of the Central Committee of Jews in Poland (CŻKH). "A survivor himself, he deposited his own testimony at the Jewish Historical Commission in Białystok on 28 September 1946."

The same year, the CŻKH published his Walka i zagłada Białostockiego Ghetta (The Struggle and Destruction of the Białystok Ghetto). In the late 1940s Datner moved to Warsaw. He became a prominent specialist on World War II crimes and the Holocaust. Of Jewish extraction, he was dismissed from his post during the 1968 Polish political crisis but was rehabilitated soon after.

In 1969–70 he presided over Warsaw's Jewish Historical Institute, and he was one of the historians at the Main Commission to Investigate Hitlerite Crimes. According to Bernd Wegner, Datner drew up the most comprehensive documentation of Nazi Germany's war crimes and atrocities in eastern Poland. In 1966 he published an article on "The Extermination of the Jewish Population in the District of Bialystok". Andrzej Żbikowski states that Datner wrote in similar vain to authors engaging in "heroic-martyrological discourse". Alexander B. Rossino names Datner as the eminent historian of Wehrmacht war crimes in Poland.

== Family ==
His daughter is Helena Datner, Polish historian and sociologist specialising in the social history of Polish Jews and the anti-semitism in Poland.

== Death ==
Datner died in 1989 in Warsaw and was interred at the Okopowa Street Jewish Cemetery.

== Publications ==
- Walka i Zagłada białostockiego getta (Łódź, 1946)
- Zbrodnie Wehrmachtu na jeńcach wojennych w II wojnie światowej (Warsaw, 1961)
- Zbrodnie okupanta w czasie powstania warszawskiego w 1944 roku (w dokumentach) (Warsaw, 1962)
- Wilhelm Koppe - nieukarany zbrodniarz hitlerowski (Warsaw-Poznań, 1963)
- Ucieczki z niewoli niemieckiej 1939-1945 (Warsaw, 1966)
- Eksterminacja ludności żydowskiej w Okręgu Białostockim (Bulletin of the Jewish Historical Institute, Warsaw, October–December 1966, no. 60: pp. 3–29)
- Niemiecki okupacyjny aparat bezpieczeństwa w okręgu białostockim (1941–1944) w świetle materiałów niemieckich (opracowania Waldemara Macholla), Biuletyn GKBZH (Warsaw, 1965)
- 55 dni Wehrmachtu w Polsce (Warsaw, 1967)
- Las sprawiedliwych. Karta z dziejów ratownictwa Żydow w okupowanej Polsce ( Warsaw, 1968)
- Tragedia w Doessel - (ucieczki z niewoli niemieckiej 1939-1945 ciąg dalszy) (Warsaw, 1970)
- Z mądrości Talmudu (Warsaw, 1988)
