= Majdan Wielki massacre =

- Part of the Invasion of Poland (1939)
- Majdan Wielki massacre (Poland)
- Location: 50°32′37″N 23°16′24″E; Majdan Wielki, Poland
- Date: September 20, 1939
- Attack type: Mass murder
- Deaths: 42 Polish POWs
- Perpetrator: Wehrmacht

The Majdan Wielki massacre, which occurred on September 20, 1939, near the village of Majdan Wielki, was a war crime committed by the Wehrmacht during its invasion of Poland. On that day, 42 Polish prisoners of war were executed by German soldiers due to false reports alleging that Poles had mutilated a dead German soldier.

== Prelude ==
During the Nazi invasion of Poland on September 19, 1939, a skirmish occurred near the village of Majdan Wielki, close to the city of Tomaszów Lubelski. One Wehrmacht soldier was killed, sustaining a fatal head wound that caused his eyes to fall from their orbits. Following the skirmish, other German soldiers discovered the body of their fallen comrade. Observing his injuries, they concluded that he had been intentionally mutilated by the enemy. Enraged by the alleged 'Polish bestiality' and incited by their officers, they sought revenge on the prisoners of war.

== The massacre ==
The next day, a group of 45 Polish POWs was brought to the battlefield. Approximately twenty German guards began beating them with belts and rifle butts. According to reports, one of the Germans addressed the prisoners, stating, "We are taking you prisoners and sending you home while you are murdering German soldiers."

Then, the beating halted with an order from a Wehrmacht officer, informing the POWs that they would be executed in retaliation for the murder and mutilation of a German soldier. The guards stepped back and opened fire. As the POWs lay on the ground, the Germans methodically targeted the wounded. After the perpetrators departed, three surviving soldiers – Tadeusz Nowak, (Note: He was a soldier of 20th Land of Kraków Infantry Regiment.) Józef Koszyk, and Józef Nycz – emerged from beneath the pile of corpses and sought refuge in a nearby barn. Several hours later, the Germans brought a second group of Polish POWs to the scene and ordered them to bury the bodies of their comrades.

This massacre of the POWs occurred without trial or any prior investigation. In addition to executing the prisoners, the Germans took thirteen civilian hostages from Majdan Wielki. However, they were released when a Wehrmacht medical commission determined that the fallen soldier's eye injuries were solely caused by the gunshot.

== Aftermath ==
On April 22, 1940, in the presence of representatives from the Polish Red Cross and the German occupying authorities, the bodies of the victims were exhumed. Among them, twenty-six POWs were identified, and subsequently, all 42 bodies were interred in a common grave at the war cemetery in Majdan Wielki.
