= Szczucin massacre =

1939 Nazi German war crime in Poland

- Part of the Invasion of Poland (1939)
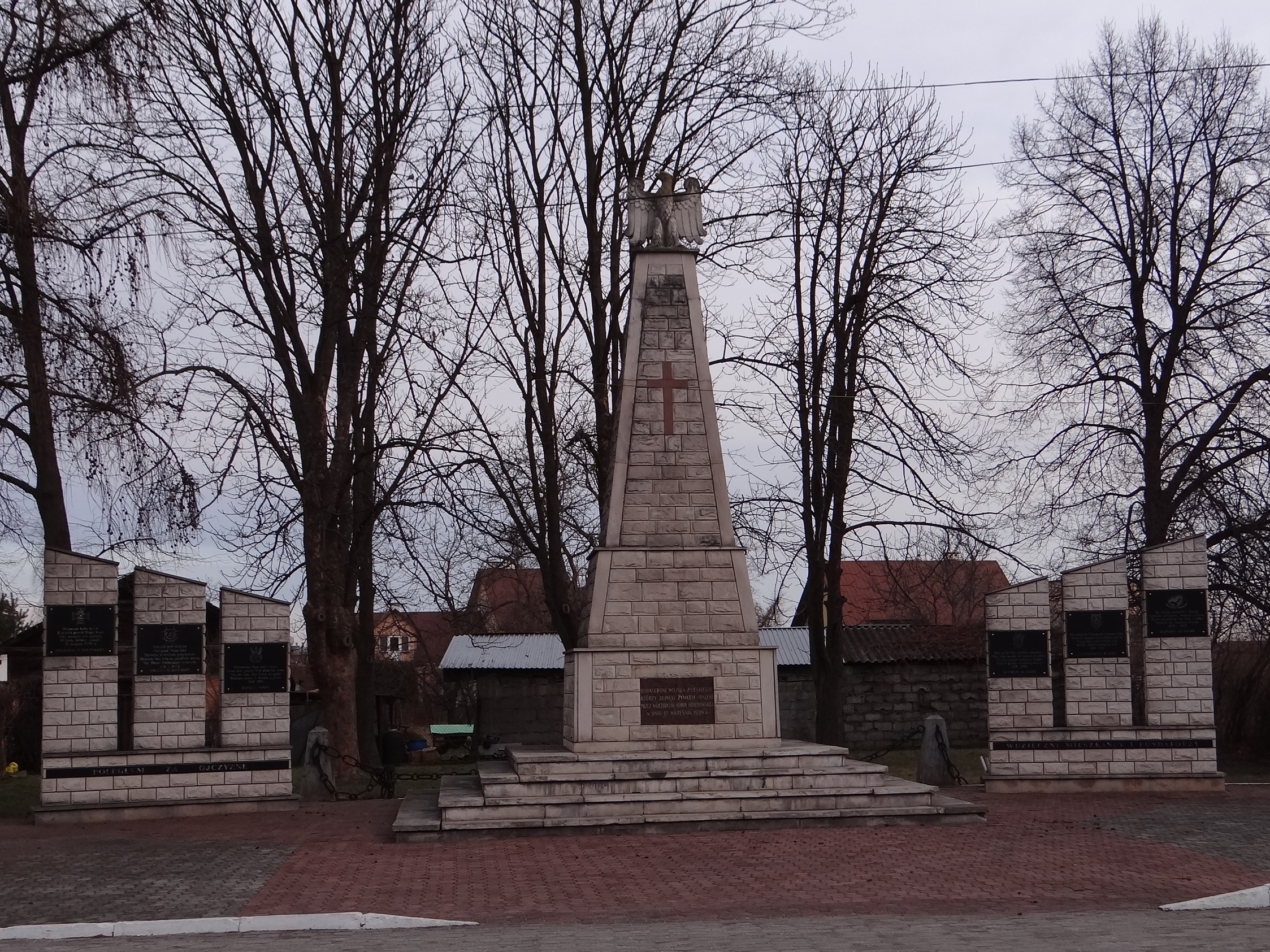
- Monument to the victims of the massacre

- Szczucin massacre (Poland)
- Location: 50°18′32″N 21°04′29″E; Szczucin, Poland
- Date: September 12, 1939
- Attack type: Mass murder
- Deaths: around 95, including 40 Polish POWs, 30 Polish civilians and 25 Jewish civilians
- Perpetrator: 8th Infantry Division of the Wehrmacht

The Szczucin massacre, which occurred on September 12, 1939, in the village of Szczucin, was a war crime committed by the Wehrmacht during its invasion of Poland. On that day, at least 40 Polish prisoners of war and around 30 civilian refugees were either shot or burned alive in the local school building. Later, 25 Jews who were brought there to bury the bodies of the earlier massacre victims were also executed by Wehrmacht soldiers.

== Prelude ==
During the Nazi invasion of Poland in September 1939, a gathering point for Polish prisoners of war was set up by the Wehrmacht in the building of a seven-grade primary school in the village of Szczucin in southern Poland. Both healthy and slightly injured POWs were confined there. Additionally, civilian refugees attempting to return to their homes in areas already under German occupation were detained there. On September 12, 1939, a violent incident occurred at the school. Polish officer Lt. Bronisław Romaniec, taking advantage of the guards’ inattention, grabbed the gun lying on the table and shot a German sergeant named Golla (a Hauptfeldwebel), who was conducting his interrogation. The Polish officer then committed suicide.

The lieutenant's desperate act served as a pretext for the Germans to murder the Poles detained in the building. After the war, a German veteran stationed in Szczucin at the time (part of a Luftwaffe depot) described the preparations for the massacre. According to this witness, in the evening, a non-commissioned officer named Kern (from Bavaria) reported to his unit's headquarters. He informed the soldiers that he was seeking volunteers to suppress the alleged revolt of Polish POWs. Volunteers were promised the Iron Cross.

== The massacre ==
On the same day, German soldiers surrounded the school and commenced shooting while throwing hand grenades through the open windows. After a while, the building burst into flames. Some Poles, seeking to avoid being burned alive, attempted to escape through windows or the roof but were shot. Approximately 40 prisoners of war and nearly 30 civilian refugees perished in the flames or by gunfire. No one managed to escape alive. However, the fate of a group of around 20-25 heavily injured POWs kept in a neighboring Catholic parish house remained unexplained. It is possible that they, too, were murdered that day.

Later, the Germans brought a group of Jews from Szczucin to the massacre site and compelled them to dig two ditches, subsequently burying the bodies of the murdered Poles in one of them. After completing their work, the Jews were abused, then shot and thrown into a second grave. The aforementioned Kern participated in the murders again. (Note: Kern allegedly beat one of the Jews to death with a rifle butt. See: Böhler (2009), p. 187.) The group of murdered Jews numbered 25 people.

According to the findings of Jochen Böhler, the massacre in Szczucin was perpetrated by soldiers of the 8th Infantry Division from the VIII Army Corps, which was part of the 14th Army commanded by General Wilhelm List. (Note: Szymon Datner stated, however incorrectly, that massacre was perpetrated by the soldiers of the X Army Corps commanded by General Wilhelm Ulex. See: Datner (1961), p. 52.) On September 13, 1939, the division headquarters received a telegram reporting: "all prisoners, including the lieutenant, were shot. POW camp was set on fire.”

== Aftermath ==
On January 25, 1940, with the consent of the Nazi occupation authorities, the bodies of the victims were exhumed. Their remains were then buried in Catholic and Jewish cemeteries. Only three victims of the massacre were identified.
