= Serock massacre =

- Part of the Invasion of Poland (1939)
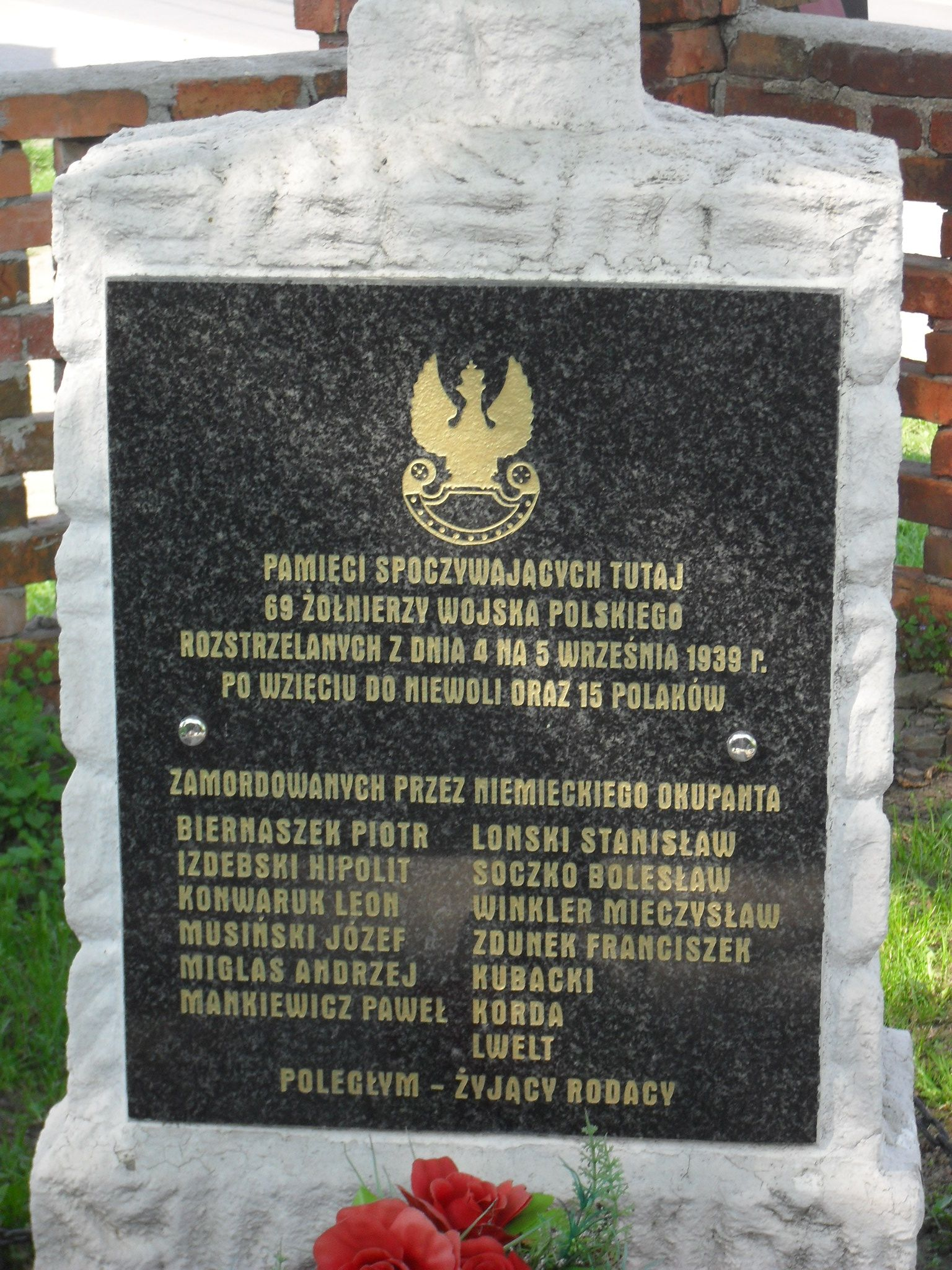
- Part of the monument to the victims of the massacre

- Serock massacre (Poland)
- Location: 53°21′24″N 18°4′57″E; Serock, Poland
- Date: September 5, 1939
- Attack type: Mass murder
- Deaths: 66–84
- Perpetrator: Wehrmacht

The Serock massacre, which took place during the night of September 4–5, 1939, in the village of Serock in northern Poland, was a war crime committed by the Wehrmacht during its invasion of Poland. On that night, between 66 and 84 Poles, mostly prisoners of war, were shot by German guards.

== The massacre ==
On September 4, 1939, at about 7:30 p.m., Wehrmacht soldiers brought a large group of approximately 3,500 Polish prisoners to a field near Serock. The majority of them were soldiers from defeated units of the Pomeranian Army, but the group also included a number of interned civilians. The prisoners were ordered to settle down for the night in the open air.

Around midnight, between 12:00 and 1:00 a.m., the guards suddenly illuminated the field with car headlights and began chaotic shooting. The terrified prisoners tried to hide in haystacks. The Poles were reportedly fired upon with rifles as well as anti-tank guns. The shooting only stopped when there was a risk of German soldiers being hit. As a result, several dozen prisoners were killed.

Szymon Datner reported that 66 Polish soldiers were murdered that night. Barbara Bojarska estimated the number of victims at 69 (over 60 POWs and several civilians), while Wehrmacht documents stated 84 victims.

The massacre was carried out by soldiers of the 604th Road Construction Battalion. According to the war diary of the German II Army Corps:

A violent shooting began, which was only stopped by the energetic intervention of officers. The soldiers of the 604th Road Construction Battalion shot 84 prisoners out of excessive nervousness.

During witness interrogations conducted in the late 1960s, it was not possible to determine whether the Polish prisoners had actually attempted to escape, as claimed by the German guards.

Datner argued that the massacre was the result of a provocation. He claimed that, after the prisoners had settled down to sleep, the German guards suddenly shouted that a tank was approaching and instructed the prisoners to hide. Some complied by hiding in haystacks, and then a single shot was fired, which served as the signal to start the massacre.

The following day, the victims’ comrades (according to other sources, local villagers) buried the murdered in a mass grave at the site of the tragedy. The victims were exhumed in October 1947. It was possible to identify several of the murdered, including one civilian: railway worker Stanisław Łoński.
