= Szczucin =

- Town
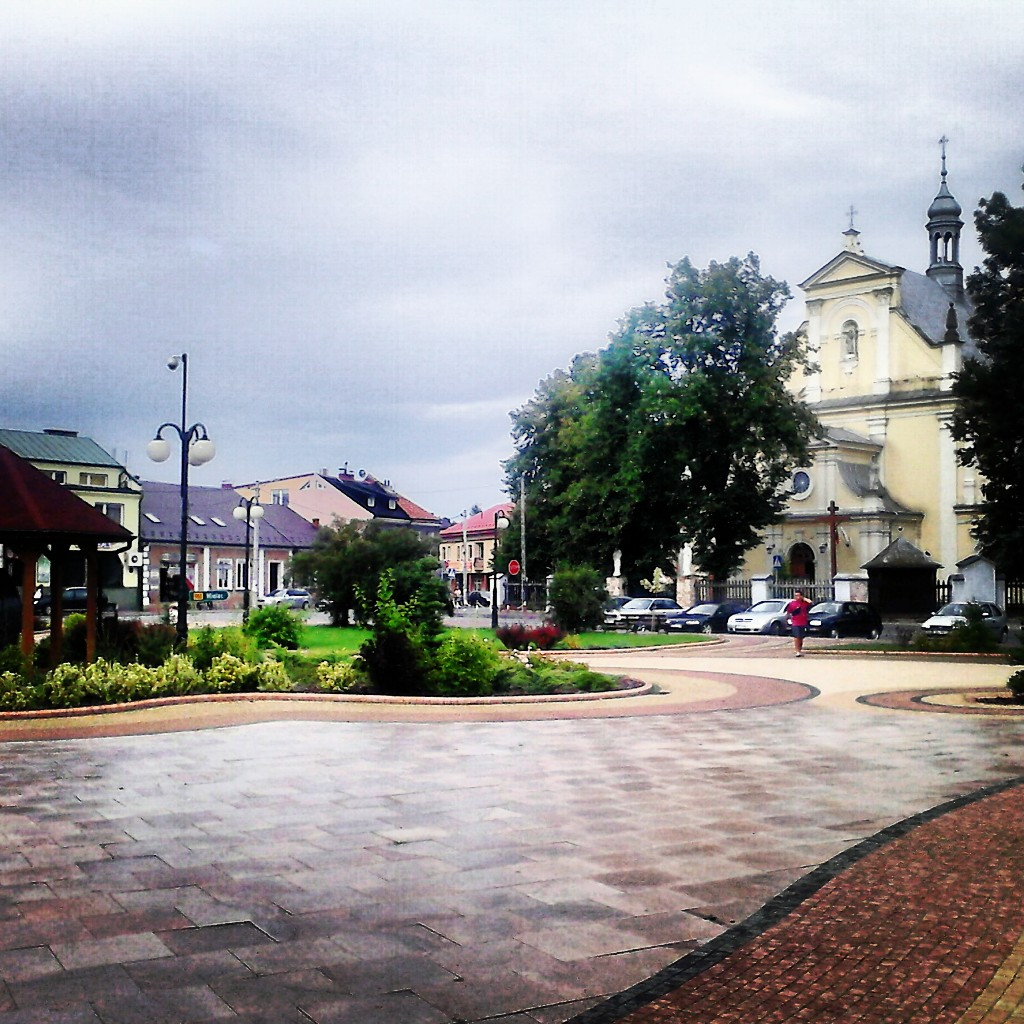
- Main square with the Baroque Saint Mary Magdalene church on the right

- Coat of arms

- Location within Poland
- Coordinates: 50°18′N 21°4′E
- Country: Poland
- Voivodeship: Lesser Poland
- County: Dąbrowa
- Gmina: Szczucin
- First mentioned: 1326
- Town rights: 1780
- Population: 4,069
- Time zone: UTC+1 (CET)
  - Summer (DST): UTC+2 (CEST)
- Vehicle registration: KDA
- Website: https://www.szczucin.pl

Szczucin [ˈʂt͡ʂut͡ɕin] is a town in Dąbrowa County, Lesser Poland Voivodeship, in southern Poland. It is the seat of the gmina (administrative district) called Gmina Szczucin. The town has a population of 4,069. It is located on the Vistula river.

== History ==
First mention of Szczucin (then known as Sucin, later Sczucin) comes from 1326, and it refers to a local parish church, which means that it must have been built earlier. The name of the town probably comes from a 14th-century owner of the location, a man named Szczuka. Due to town's location on the Vistula, a river port was established here. Timber from the Sandomierz Forest was brought here, loaded on ships and hauled to Gdańsk, the biggest port of the Kingdom of Poland. Furthermore, Szczucin was a crossing point of the Vistula, along a north–south merchant trail. Administratively, Szczucin was located in the Sandomierz Voivodeship in the Lesser Poland Province. In 1780 the village obtained town rights, but in 1934 it lost them, as its population fell below the then required 3,000. Szczucin regained its town rights on 1 January 2009.

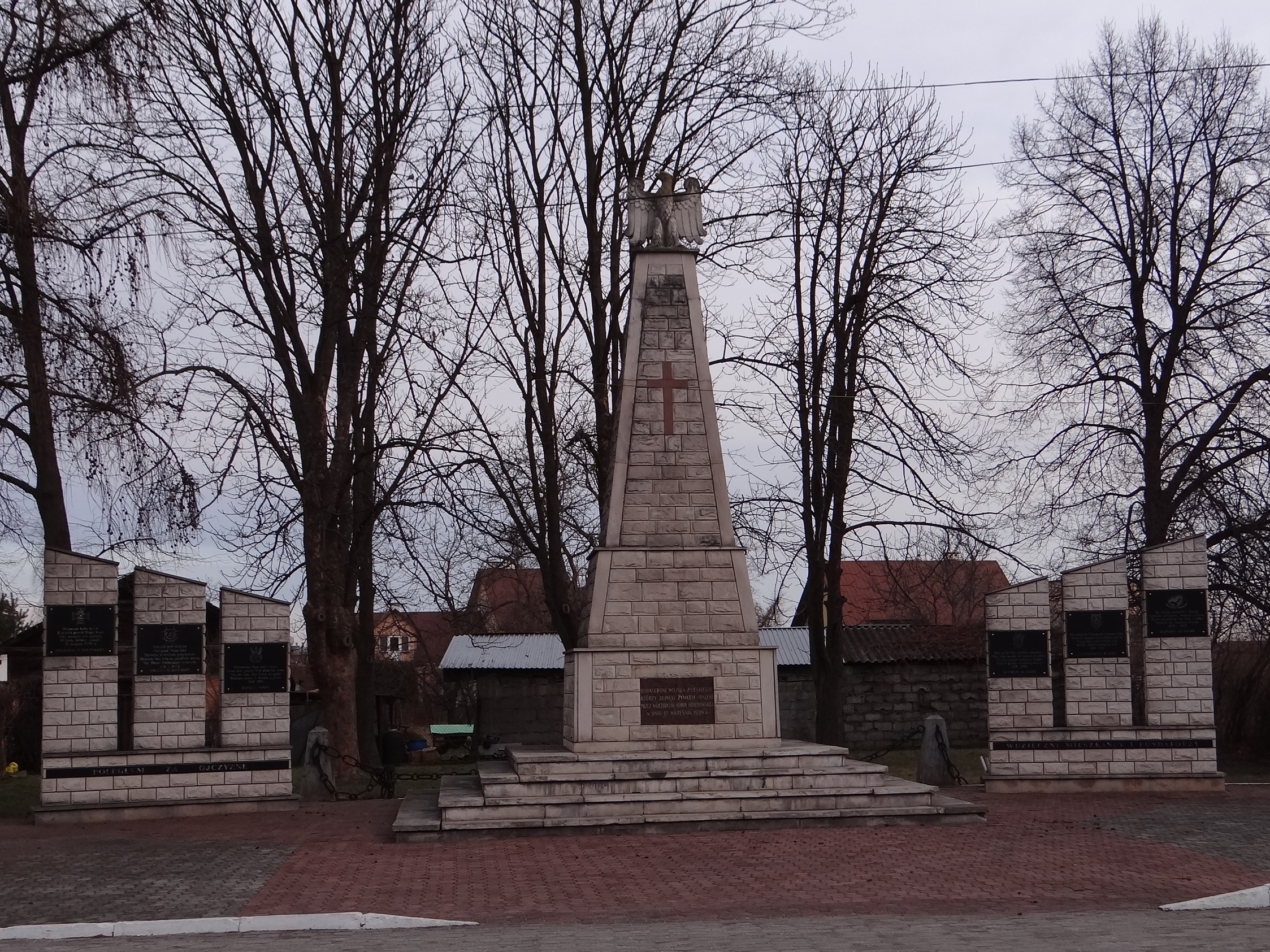
Memorial to Poles massacred by the invading Germans on September 12, 1939

After the Partitions of Poland, Szczucin found itself in the Austrian Partition of Poland, since 1815 located on the Austrian-Russian border, and the town stagnated. In the autumn of 1914, during World War I, Szczucin was captured by the Russians, who remained here until 1915 (see Gorlice–Tarnów Offensive). In 1918, Poland regained independence and control of the town.

During the German invasion of Poland, which started World War II in September 1939, Szczucin was the area of several skirmishes between retreating units of the Kraków Army, and the advancing Wehrmacht. On September 12, 1939, German soldiers carried out a massacre of around 40 Polish prisoners of war and around 30 Polish civilian refugees (see also Nazi crimes against the Polish nation). Altogether, 70 Poles were murdered, and this tragedy is commemorated by a monument. During the German occupation, Szczucin was a center of the Polish resistance movement. In 1943, soldiers of the Jędrusie resistance organization executed here an officer of the Blue Police. In late 1944, Germans ordered evacuation of all Szczucin's inhabitants, because they prepared defensive positions along the Vistula.

Before Polish administrative reorganization (1999) Szczucin was part of Tarnów Voivodeship (1975–1998).

== Transport ==
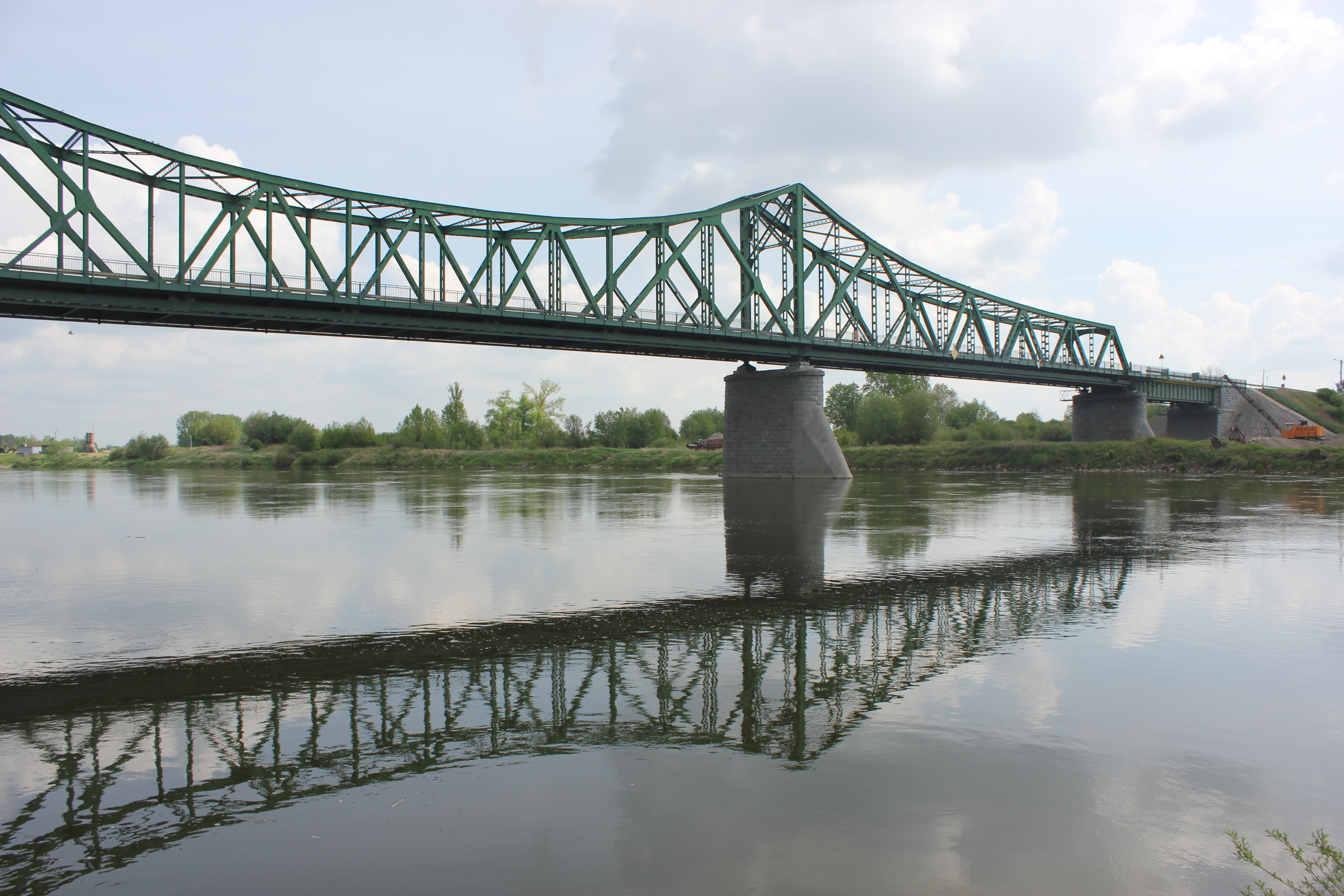
Bridge over the Vistula River

The town is placed along National Road No. 73 (Warsaw – Kielce – Tarnów – Jasło), and here regional road No. 982 stems eastwards, to Mielec, making Szczucin a local transportation hub.

Szczucin is the ending station of a secondary-importance, one track rail line Tarnów – Dąbrowa Tarnowska – Szczucin, built by the Austrian government in 1906. There were several plans to extend the line northwards, to Busko Zdroj and Kielce, but so far, they have not been carried out. Current shape of the line is the result of Szczucin's having been located until 1918 on northern border of Austria-Hungary. The Vistula marked the border, beyond which stretched the Russian Empire, and the governments of both countries were not interested in completion of the line, which would otherwise have connected Austrian-controlled Tarnów with Russian-controlled Kielce.

== Culture ==
One of the main historic heritage sights of Szczucin is the Baroque Saint Mary Magdalene church, located at the Market Square in the town center.

Szczucin is home to Poland's only road museum (Muzeum Drogownictwa), which has the area of two hectares, displaying ancient road building machines, as well as road signs, road posts, documents and other items.
