= Serock, Kuyavian-Pomeranian Voivodeship =

Serock
- Village
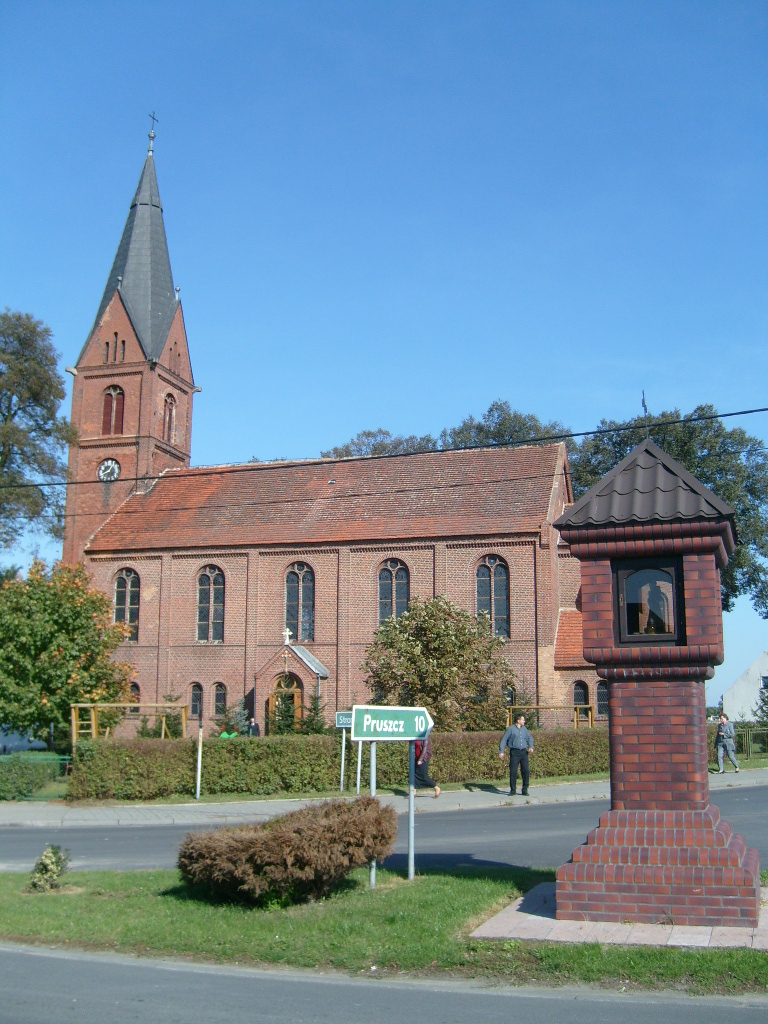
- Church of Our Lady of the Rosary

- Location within Poland
- Coordinates: 53°21′24″N 18°4′57″E
- Country: Poland
- Voivodeship: Kuyavian-Pomeranian
- County: Świecie
- Gmina: Pruszcz
- Elevation: 100 m (330 ft)

Population
  - Total: 2,000
- Time zone: UTC+1 (CET)
  - Summer (DST): UTC+2 (CEST)
- Postal code: 86-120
- Vehicle registration: CSW

Serock [ˈsɛrɔt͡sk] is a village in the administrative district of Gmina Pruszcz, within Świecie County, Kuyavian-Pomeranian Voivodeship, in north-central Poland.

== History ==
Before the Holocaust, the village had a Jewish community.

In September 1939, during the German invasion of Poland, the village was a site of massacre of several dozens of Polish prisoners of war by the German troops (the Serock massacre).
