= Majdan Wielki, Zamość County =

Majdan Wielki
- Village
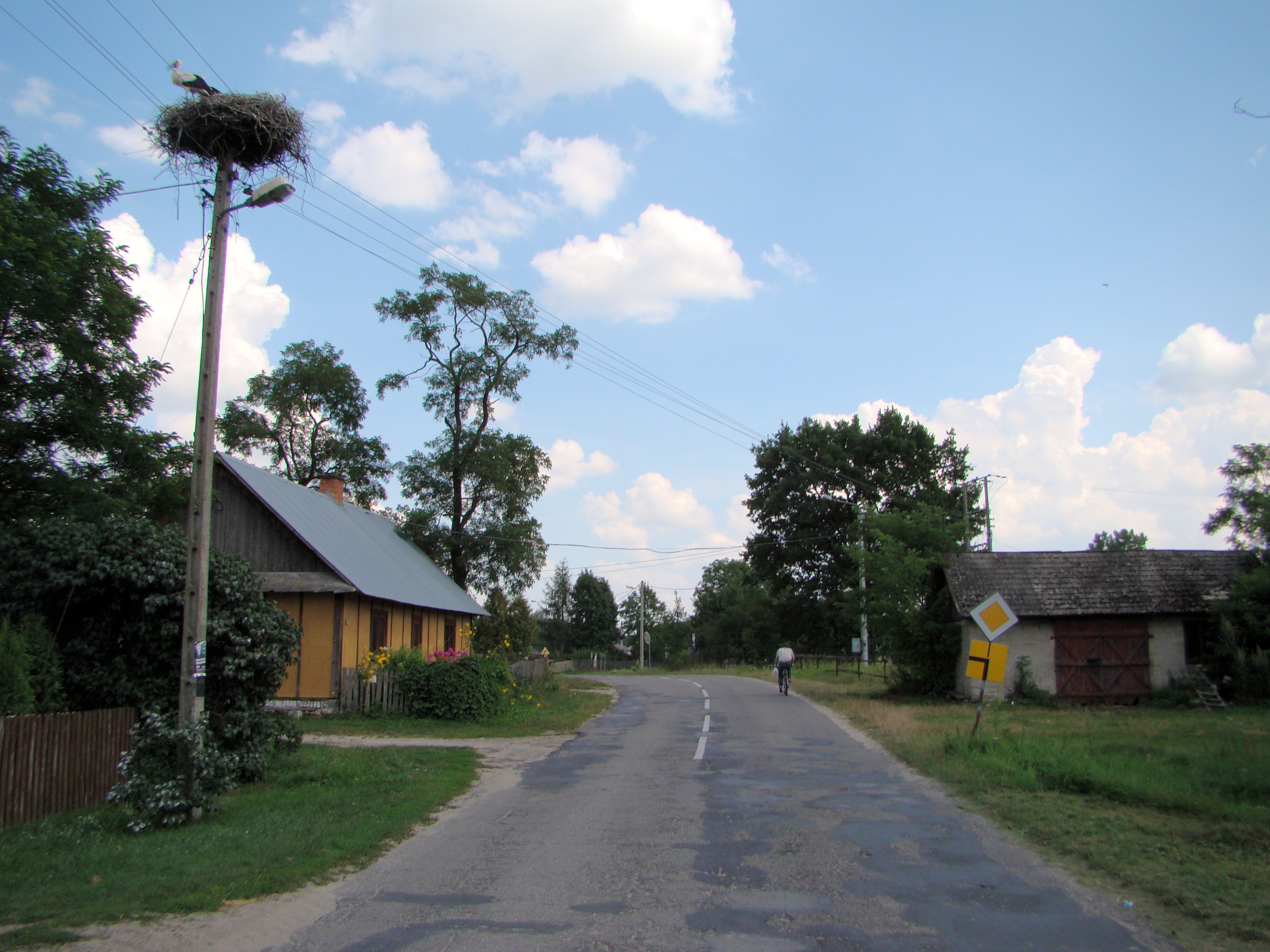
- Road through the village

- Location within Poland
- Coordinates: 50°33′N 23°17′E
- Country: Poland
- Voivodeship: Lublin
- County: Zamość
- Gmina: Krasnobród

Population
  - Total: 916
- Time zone: UTC+1 (CET)
  - Summer (DST): UTC+2 (CEST)
- Vehicle registration: LZA

Majdan Wielki (Polish pronunciation: [ˈmajdan ˈvjɛlkʲi]) is a village in the administrative district of Gmina Krasnobród, within Zamość County, Lublin Voivodeship, in southeastern Poland.

== History ==
On 20 September 1939, during the invasion of Poland, German troops carried out a massacre of 42 Polish prisoners of war near the village (see also Nazi crimes against the Polish nation). At least one Polish soldier survived the massacre.
