= German war crimes =

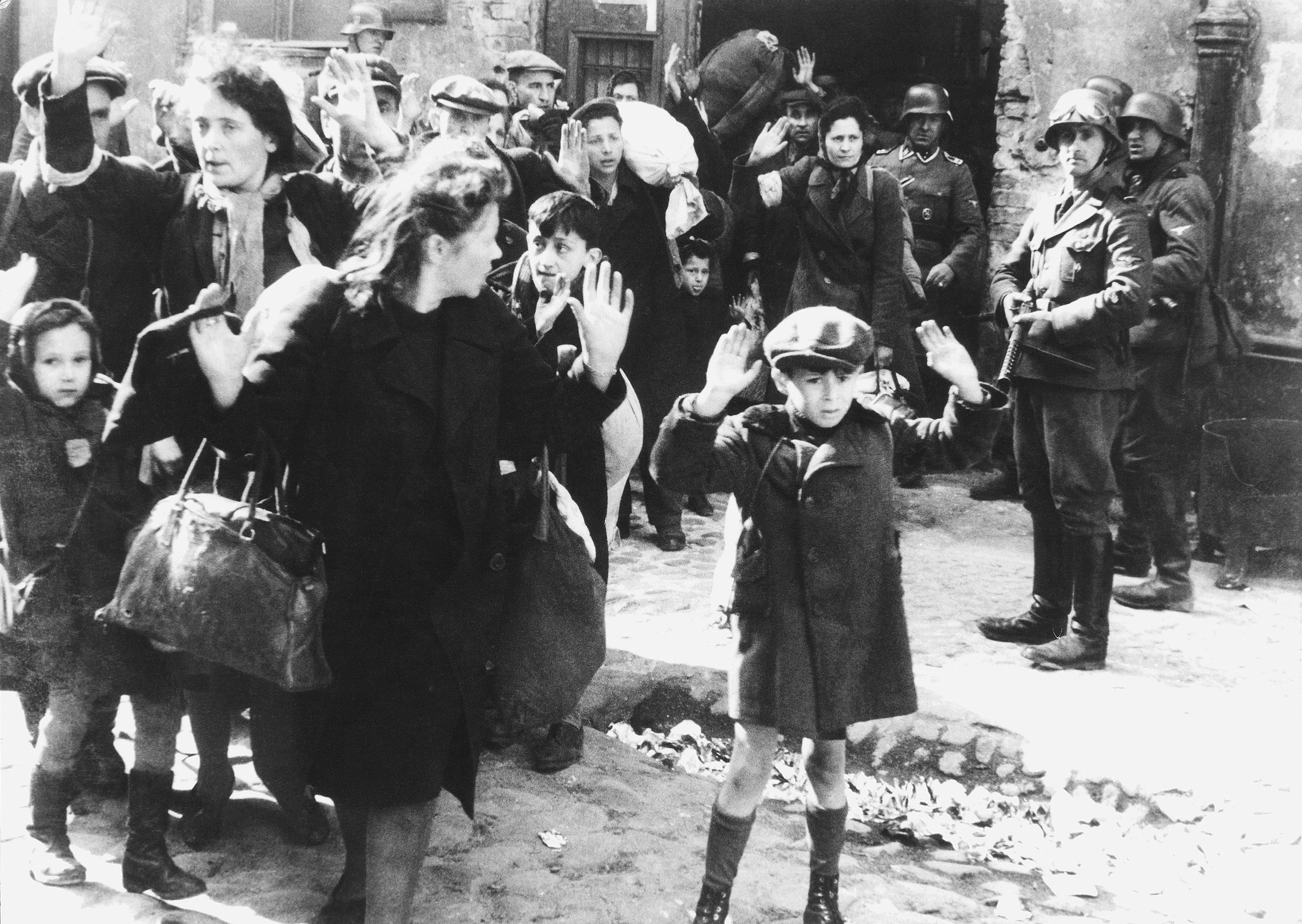
- Jewish women and children removed from a bunker by Schutzstaffel (SS) units during the Warsaw Ghetto Uprising for deportations to Majdanek or Treblinka extermination camps (1943)
- Location: Africa and Europe
- Date: 1904–1918 (first phase); 1933–1945 (second phase)
- Target: Until 1918: Herero and Nama people; Belgian and French civilians; Prisoners of war; From 1933: Jews; Slavs; Romani people; Prisoners of war (Note: Especially Soviet, Italian and Polish POWs.); Disabled people; Political dissidents; Freemasons; Homosexuals; Others
- Attack type: Genocide, mass murder, ethnic cleansing, state terrorism, deportation, starvation, forced labour, mass rape (genocidal rape), mass looting, abduction, human experimentation, compulsory sterilization, forced assimilation
- Deaths: 18.926.700 (Note: 11.000.000 Slavs; 6,000,000 Jews; 1,500,000 Romanis; 270,000 Disabled people; 80,000 Freemasons; 15,000 Homosexuals)
- Perpetrators: German Empire (1904–1918); Nazi Germany (1933–1945)
- Motive: Expansionism; Imperialism; Colonialism; Irredentism; Nationalism; Pan-Germanism; Germanisation; Racism; From 1933; Nazism; Nordicism; Antisemitism; Antiziganism; Slavophobia; Xenophobia; Homophobia; Ableism

The governments of the German Empire and Nazi Germany (under Adolf Hitler) ordered, organized, and condoned a substantial number of war crimes, first in the Namibian genocide and then in the First and Second World Wars. The most notable of these is the Holocaust, in which millions of European Jews, Romanis and Slavs were systematically abused, deported, and murdered. Millions of civilians and prisoners of war also died as a result of German abuses, mistreatment, and deliberate starvation policies in those two conflicts. Much of the evidence was deliberately destroyed by the perpetrators, such as in Sonderaktion 1005, in an attempt to conceal these crimes.

== Herero Wars ==
Considered to have been the first genocide of the 20th century, the Herero and Nama genocide was perpetrated by the German Empire between 1904 and 1907 in German South West Africa (modern-day Namibia), during the Scramble for Africa. On January 12, 1904, the Herero people, led by Samuel Maharero, rebelled against German colonialism. In August, General Lothar von Trotha of the Imperial German Army defeated the Herero in the Battle of Waterberg and drove them into the desert of Omaheke, where most of them died of thirst. In October, the Nama people also rebelled against the Germans only to suffer a similar fate.

In total, from 24,000 up to 100,000 Herero and 10,000 Nama died. The genocide was characterized by widespread death by starvation and thirst because the Herero who fled the violence were prevented from returning from the Namib Desert. Some sources also claim that the German colonial army systematically poisoned wells in the desert.

== World War I ==
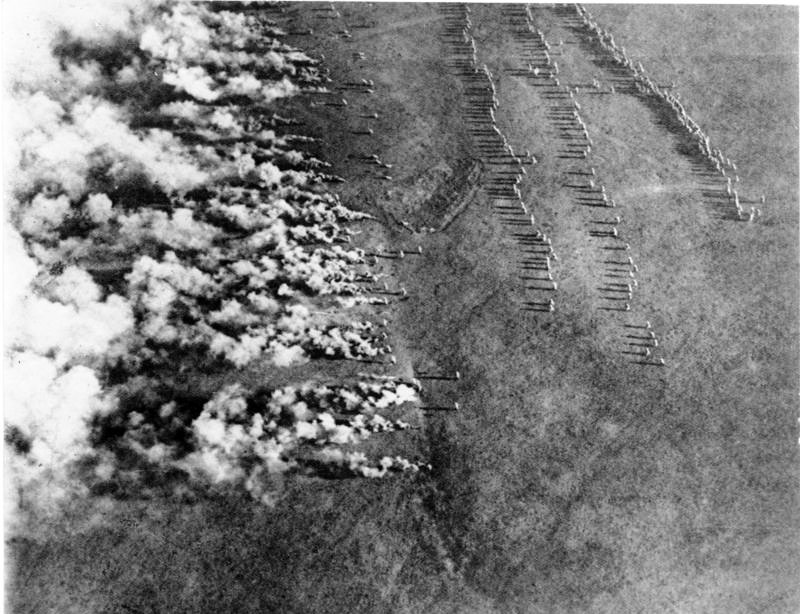
Aerial photograph of a German gas attack on the Eastern Front of World War I. Lethal poison gas was first introduced by Germany and subsequently utilized by the other major belligerents in violation of the Hague Convention IV of 1907.

Documentation regarding German war crimes in World War I was seized and destroyed by Nazi Germany during World War II, after occupying France, along with monuments commemorating their victims.

=== Chemical weapons in warfare ===
Poison gas was first introduced as a weapon by Imperial Germany, and subsequently used by all major belligerents, in violation of the 1899 Hague Declaration Concerning Asphyxiating Gases and the 1907 Hague Convention on Land Warfare, which explicitly forbade the use of "poison or poisoned weapons" in warfare.

=== Belgium ===
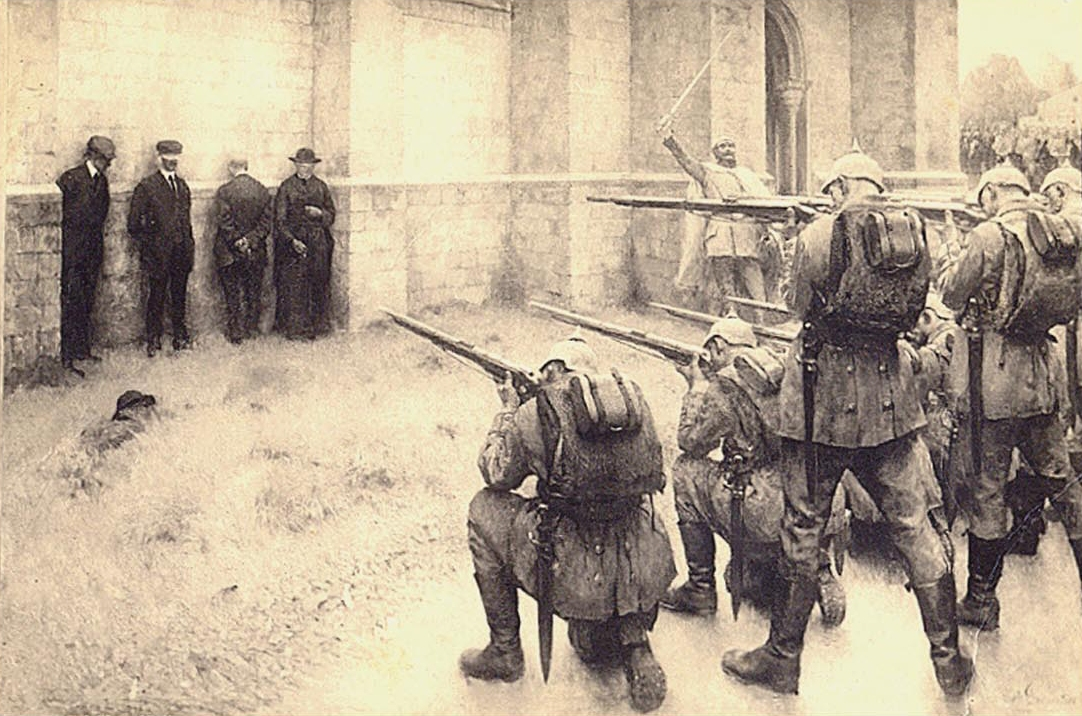
Depiction of the execution of civilians in Blégny by Évariste Carpentier

In August 1914, as part of the Schlieffen Plan, the German Army invaded and occupied the neutral nation of Belgium without explicit warning, which violated a treaty of 1839 that the German chancellor dismissed as a "scrap of paper" and the 1907 Hague Convention on Opening of Hostilities. Within the first two months of the war, the German occupiers terrorized the Belgians, killing thousands of civilians and looting and burning scores of towns, including Leuven, which housed the country's preeminent university, mainly in retaliation for Belgian guerrilla warfare, (see francs-tireurs). This action was in violation of the 1907 Hague Convention on Land Warfare provisions that prohibited collective punishment of civilians and looting and destruction of civilian property in occupied territories.

=== Bombardment of English coastal towns ===
The raid on Scarborough, Hartlepool and Whitby, which took place on December 16, 1914, was an attack by the Imperial German Navy on the British seaport towns of Scarborough, Hartlepool, West Hartlepool, and Whitby. The attack resulted in 137 fatalities and 592 casualties. The raid was in violation of the ninth section of the 1907 Hague Convention which prohibited naval bombardments of undefended towns without warning, because only Hartlepool was protected by shore batteries. Germany was a signatory of the 1907 Hague Convention. Another attack followed on 26 April 1916 on the coastal towns of Yarmouth and Lowestoft but both were important naval bases and defended by shore batteries.

=== Unrestricted submarine warfare ===
Unrestricted submarine warfare was instituted in 1915 in response to the British naval blockade of Germany. Prize rules, which were codified under the 1907 Hague Convention—such as those that required commerce raiders to warn their targets and allow time for the crew to board lifeboats—were disregarded and commercial vessels were sunk regardless of nationality, cargo, or destination. Following the sinking of the RMS Lusitania on 7 May 1915 and subsequent public outcry in various neutral countries, including the United States, the practice was withdrawn. However, Germany resumed the practice on 1 February 1917 and declared that all merchant ships regardless of nationalities would be sunk without warning. This outraged the U.S. public, prompting the U.S. to break diplomatic relations with Germany two days later, and, along with the Zimmermann Telegram, led the U.S. entry into the war two months later on the side of the Allied Powers.

== World War II ==
Chronologically, the first German World War II era war crime, and the very first major act of the war, was the bombing of Wieluń, a town where no targets of military value were present.

More significantly, the Holocaust of the European Jews, the extermination of millions of Poles, the Action T4 killing of the disabled, and the Porajmos of the Romani are the most notable war crimes committed by Nazi Germany during World War II. Not all of the crimes committed during the Holocaust and similar mass atrocities were war crimes. Telford Taylor (The U.S. prosecutor in the German High Command case at the Nuremberg Trials and Chief Counsel for the twelve trials before the U.S. Nuremberg Military Tribunals) explained in 1982:

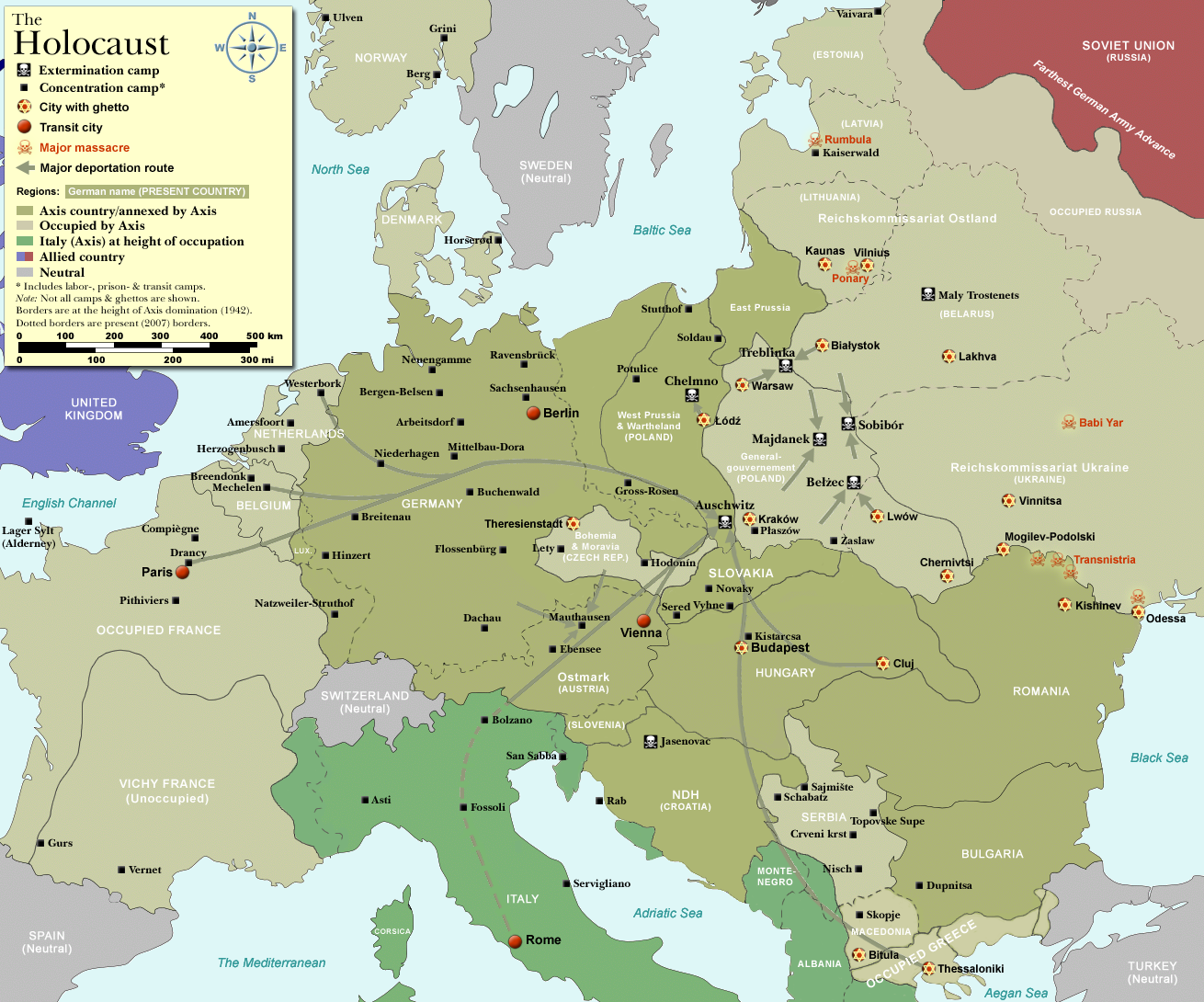
The Holocaust: ghettos, concentration camps, and extermination camps during World War II across German-occupied Europe

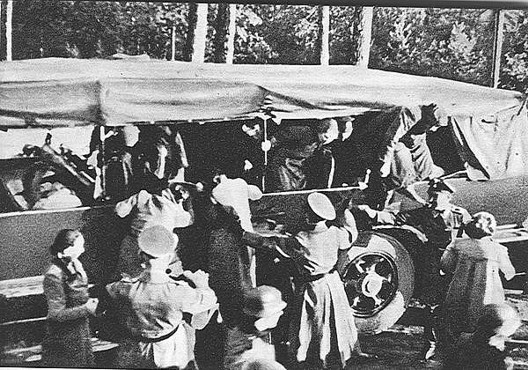
Polish hostages preparing for mass execution by Nazi Germans, 1940

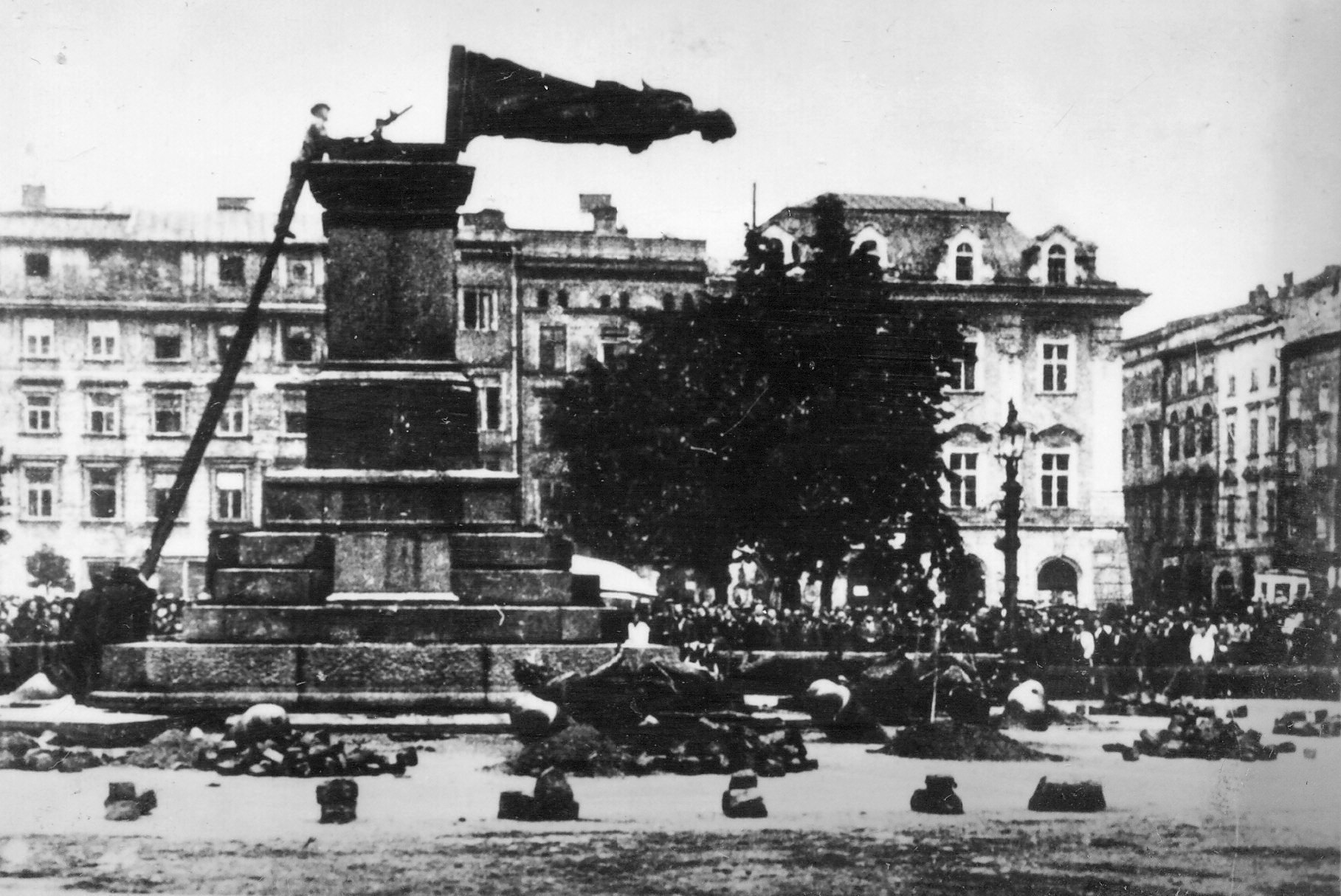
Destruction of Adam Mickiewicz Monument in Kraków, Poland, by Nazi German forces on August 17, 1940

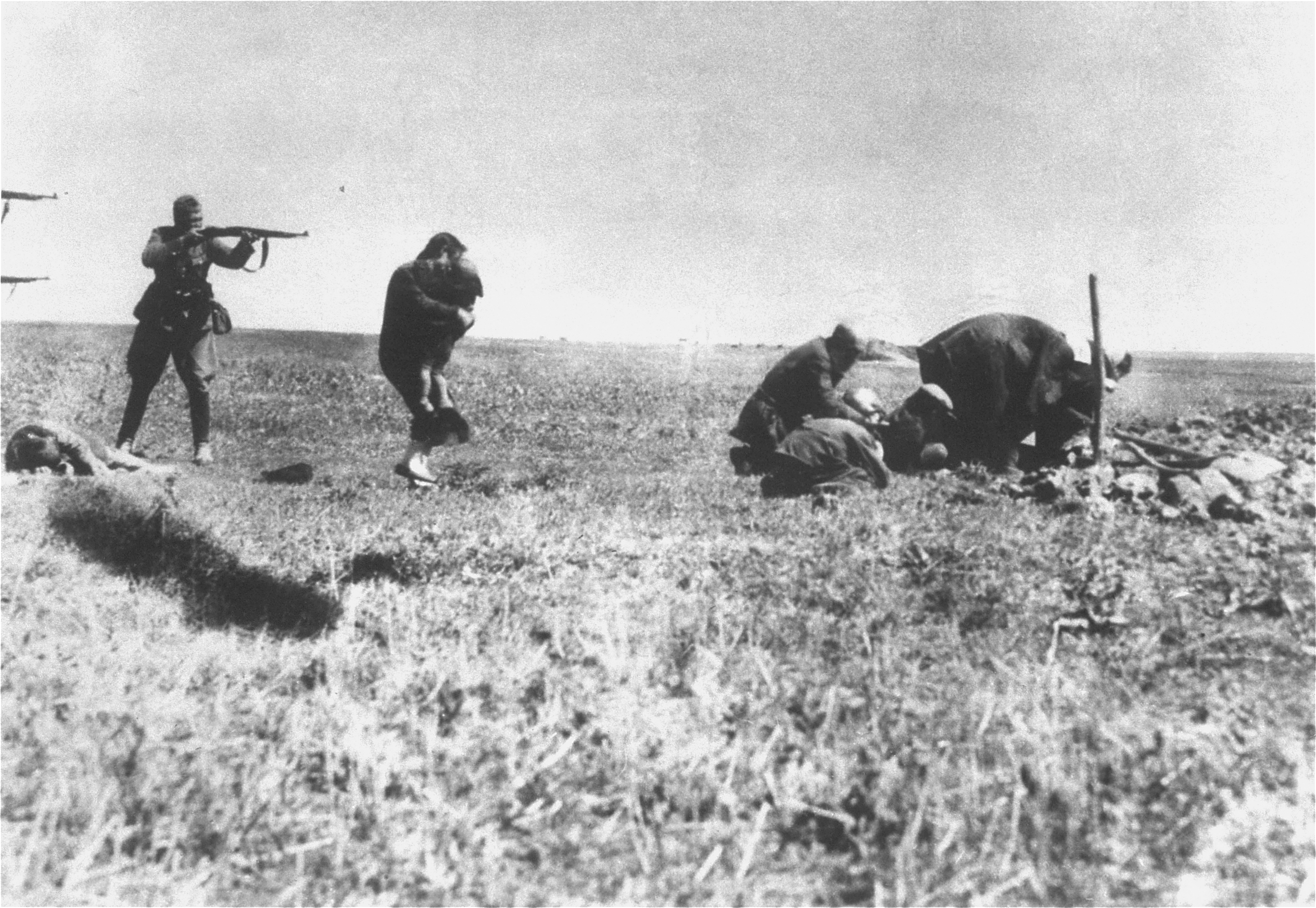
Ivanhorod Einsatzgruppen photograph: murdering of Jewish civilians by Nazi German army mobile killing units (Einsatzgruppen) near Ivanhorod, Ukraine, 1942.

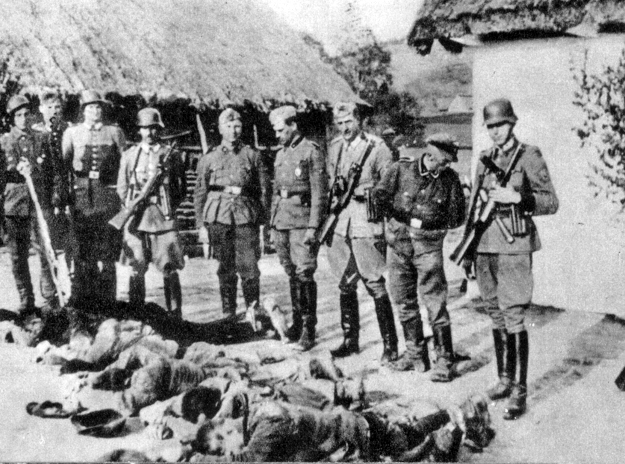
Polish farmers killed by Nazi German forces, German-occupied Poland, 1943

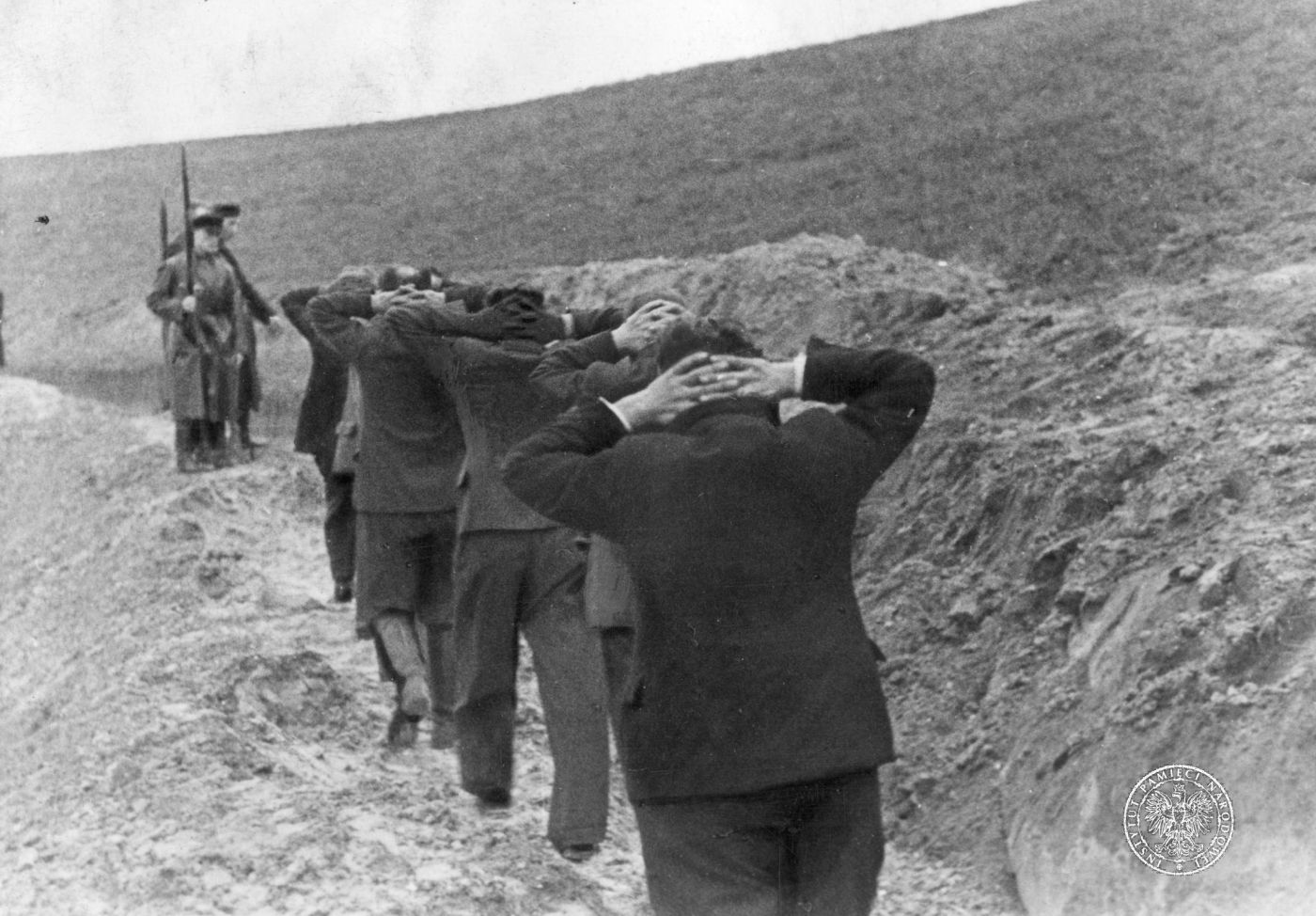
Polish teachers from Bydgoszcz guarded by members of Volksdeutscher Selbstschutz before execution, 1 November 1939

as far as wartime actions against enemy nationals are concerned, the [1948] Genocide Convention added virtually nothing to what was already covered (and had been since the Hague Convention of 1899) by the internationally accepted laws of land warfare, which require an occupying power to respect "family honors and rights, individual lives and private property, as well as religious convictions and liberty" of the enemy nationals. But the laws of war do not cover, in time of either war or peace, a government's actions against its own nationals (such as Nazi Germany's persecution of German Jews). And at the Nuremberg war crimes trials, the tribunals rebuffed several efforts by the prosecution to bring such "domestic" atrocities within the scope of international law as "crimes against humanity."

— Telford Taylor

- German mistreatment of Soviet prisoners of war – at least 3.3 million Soviet POWs died in German custody, out of 5.7 million captured; this figure represents 57% POW casualty rate.
- Le Paradis massacre, May 1940, British soldiers of the Royal Norfolk Regiment, were captured by the SS and subsequently murdered. Fritz Knoechlein was tried, found guilty and hanged.
- Wormhoudt massacre, May 1940, British and French soldiers captured by the SS and subsequently murdered. No one was found guilty of the crime.
- Lidice massacre after assassination of Reinhard Heydrich in 1942, when the Czech village was utterly destroyed, and inhabitants murdered.
- Normandy Massacres, a series of killings in which up to 156 Canadian prisoners of war were murdered by soldiers of the 12th SS Panzer Division (Hitler Youth) during the Battle of Normandy
  - Ardenne Abbey massacre, one of the Normandy massacres; June 1944 Canadian soldiers captured by the SS and murdered by 12th SS Panzer Division Hitlerjugend. SS General Kurt Meyer (Panzermeyer) sentenced to be shot 1946; sentence commuted; released 1954
- Graignes massacre, 11 June 1944, United States POWs that had surrendered were executed by 17th SS Panzergrenadier Division Götz von Berlichingen by shooting and stabbing.
- Malmedy massacre, December 1944, United States POWs captured by Kampfgruppe Peiper were murdered outside of Malmedy, Belgium.
- Wereth massacre. 17 December 1944, soldiers from 3./SS-PzAA1 LSSAH captured eleven African-American soldiers from 333rd Artillery Battalion in the hamlet of Wereth, Belgium. Subsequently, the prisoners were tortured, shot, and had their fingers cut off, legs broken, eyes gouged out, jaw broken and at least one was shot while trying to bandage a comrade's wounds.
- Wahlhausen massacre, January 1945, United States POWs from the 28th Infantry Division captured by German troops were summarily executed.
- Gardelegen massacre of April 1945 when Nazi concentration camp prisoners were herded into a barn, which was then set alight, killing all inside
- Oradour-sur-Glane massacre
- Massacre of Kalavryta
- Unrestricted submarine warfare against merchant shipping.
- The intentional destruction of major medieval churches of Novgorod, of monasteries in the Moscow region (e.g., of New Jerusalem Monastery) and of the imperial palaces around St. Petersburg.
- The campaign of extermination of Slavic population in the occupied territories. Several thousand villages were burned with their entire population (e.g., Khatyn massacre in Belarus). A quarter of the inhabitants of Belarus did not survive the German occupation.
- Soap made from human corpses produced on a small-scale by German scientist Rudolf Spanner.
- Commando Order, the secret order issued by Hitler in October 1942 stating that Allied combatants encountered during commando operations were to be executed immediately without trial, even if they were properly uniformed, unarmed, or intending to surrender.
- Commissar Order, the order from Hitler to Wehrmacht troops before the invasion of the Soviet Union in 1941 to shoot Commissars immediately on capture.
- Nacht und Nebel decree of 1941 for disappearance of prisoners.

=== War criminals ===
- List of Axis personnel indicted for war crimes
- List of Nazi doctors
- Adolf Eichmann
- Heinrich Gross
- Hans Heinze
- Rudolf Hoess
- Karl Linnas
- Josef Mengele
- Otmar Freiherr von Verschuer
- Alfred Trzebinski

=== Massacres and war crimes of World War II by location ===
==== Austria ====
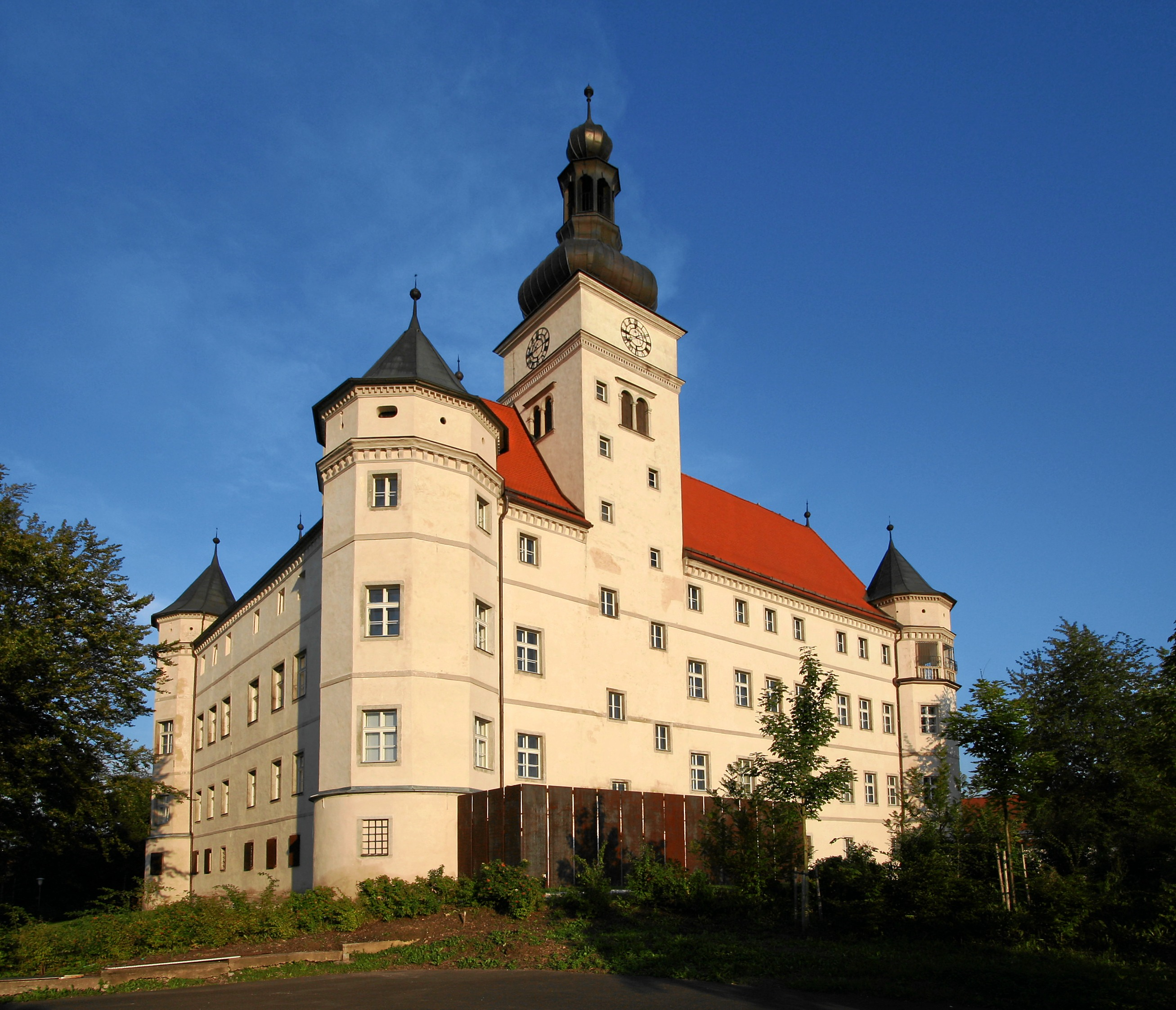
Hartheim Euthanasia Centre, where over 18,000 people were killed in Aktion T4

- Murders of disabled children by Heinrich Gross
- Recommendation of disabled children for euthanasia by Hans Asperger

==== Belarus ====
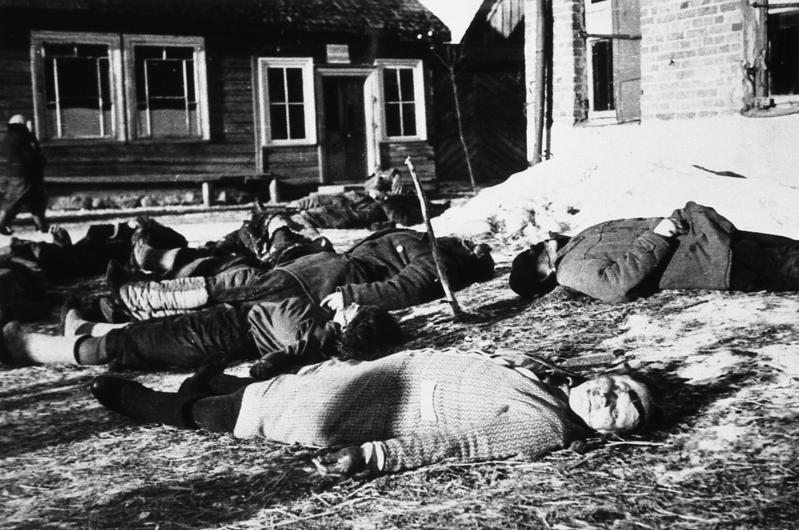
Mass murder of Soviet civilians near Minsk, 1943

- The Holocaust in Belarus
- Anti-partisan operations in Belarus
- Operation Bamberg
- Operation Cottbus

1941

- 27 October, Slutsk, Slutsk Affair (4,000 people, including women and children)
- 28 September – 17 October, Pleszczenice-Bischolin-Szack (Šacak)-Bobr-Uzda (White Ruthenia) massacre (1,126 children)

1942

- 26 March – 6 April, Operation Bamberg (Hłusk, Bobrujsk; 4,396 people, including children)
- April 29 and August 10, 1942, Dzyatlava massacre, Diatłowo (Dzyatlava); 3,000- 5,000 people, including women and children
- 9 – 12 May, Kliczów-Bobrujsk massacre (520 people, including children)
- Beginning of June, Słowodka-Bobrujsk massacre (1,000 people, including children)
- 15 June Borki (powiat białostocki) massacre (1,741 people, including children)
- 21 June Zbyszin massacre (1,076 people, including children)
- 25 June Timkowiczi massacre (900 people, including children)
- 26 June Studenka massacre (836 people, including children)
- 18 July, Jelsk massacre (1,000 people, including children)
- 15 July – 7 August, Operation Adler (Bobrujsk, Mohylew, Berezyna; 1,381 people, including children)
- 14 – 20 August, Operation Greif (Orsza, Witebsk; 796 people, including children)
- 22 August – 21 September, Operation Sumpffieber (White Ruthenia; 10,063 people, including children)
- August, Bereźne massacre
- 22 September – 26 September (Małoryta massacre; 4,038 people, including children)
- 23 September – 3 October, Operation Blitz (Połock, Witebsk; 567 people, including children)
- 11 – 23 October, Operation Karlsbad (Orsza, Witebsk; 1,051 people, including children)
- 23 – 29 November, Operation Nürnberg (Dubrowka; 2,974 people, including children)
- December, Mirnaya massacre, Mirnaya (Мірная), Belarus (be); 147 including women and children
- 10 – 21 December, Operation Hamburg (Niemen River-Szczara River; 6,172 people, including children)
- 22 – 29 December, Operation Altona (Słonim; 1,032 people, including children)

1943

- 6 – 14 January, Operation Franz (Grodsjanka; 2,025 people, including children)
- 10 – 11 January, Operation Peter (Kliczów, Kolbcza; 1,400 people, including children)
- 18 – 23 January, Słuck-Mińsk-Czerwień massacre (825 people, including children)
- 28 January – 15 February, Operation Schneehase (Połock, Rossony, Krasnopole; 2,283 people, including children); 54; 37
- Until 28 January, Operation Erntefest I (Czerwień, Osipowicze; 1,228 people, including children)
- Jaanuar, Operation Eisbär (between Briańsk and Dmitriev-Lgowski)
- Until 1 February, Operation Waldwinter (Sirotino-Trudy; 1,627 people, including children)
- 8 – 26 February, Operation Hornung (Lenin, Hancewicze; 12,897 people, including children)
- Until 9 February, Operation Erntefest II (Słuck, Kopyl; 2,325 people, including children)
- 15 February – end of March, Operation Winterzauber (Oświeja, Latvian border; 3,904 people, including children)
- 22 February – 8 March, Operation Kugelblitz (Połock, Oświeja, Dryssa, Rossony; 3,780 people, including children)
- Until 19 March, Operation Nixe (Ptycz, Mikaszewicze, Pińsk; 400 people, including children)
- Until 21 March, Operation Föhn (Pińsk; 543 people, including children)
- 21 March – 2 April, Operation Donnerkeil (Połock, Witebsk; 542 people, including children)
- March 22, Khatyn massacre, Khatyn; 149 people including women and children
- 1 – 9 May, Operation Draufgänger II (Rudnja and Manyly forest; 680 people, including children)
- 17 – 21 May, Operation Maigewitter (Witebsk, Suraż, Gorodok; 2,441 people, including children)
- 20 May – 23 June, Operation Cottbus (Lepel, Begomel, Uszacz; 11,796 people, including children)
- 27 May – 10 June, Operation Weichsel (Dniepr-Prypeć triangle, South-West of Homel; 4,018 people, including children)
- 13 – 16 June, Operation Ziethen (Rzeczyca; 160 people, including children)
- 25 June – 27 July, Operation Seydlitz (Owrucz-Mozyrz; 5,106 people, including children)
- 30 July, Mozyrz massacre (501 people, including children)
- Until 14 July, Operation Günther (Woloszyn, Lagoisk; 3,993 people, including children)
- 13 July – 11 August, Operation Hermann (Iwie, Nowogródek, Woloszyn, Stołpce; 4,280 people, including children)
- 24 September – 10 October, Operation Fritz (Głębokie; 509 people, including children)
- 9 October – 22 October, Stary Bychów massacre (1,769 people, including children)
- 1 November – 18 November, Operation Heinrich (Rossony, Połock, Idrica; 5,452 people, including children)
- December, Spasskoje massacre (628 people, including children)
- December, Biały massacre (1,453 people, including children)
- 20 December – 1 January 1944, Operation Otto (Oświeja; 1,920 people, including children)

1944

- 14 January, Oła massacre (1,758 people, including children)
- 22 January, Baiki massacre (987 people, including children)
- 3 – 15 February, Operation Wolfsjagd (Hłusk, Bobrujsk; 467 people, including children)
- 5 – 6 February, Barysz (near Buczacz) massacre (126 people, including children; see pl:Zbrodnie w Baryszu)
- Until 19 February, Operation Sumpfhahn (Hłusk, Bobrujsk; 538 people, including children)
- Beginning of March, Berezyna-Bielnicz massacre (686 people, including children)
- 7 – 17 April, Operation Auerhahn (Bobrujsk; c. 1,000 people, including children)
- 17 April – 12 May, Operation Frühlingsfest (Połock, Uszacz; 7,011 people, including children)
- 25 May – 17 June, Operation Kormoran; (Wilejka, Borysów, Minsk; 7,697 people, including children)
- 2 June – 13 June, Operation Pfingsrose (Talka; 499 people, including children)
- June, Operation Pfingstausnlug (Sienno; 653 people, including children)
- June, Operation Windwirbel (Chidra; 560 people, including children)

==== Belgium ====
1940

- May 25, Vinkt Massacre (Vinkt, East Flanders; 86-140 people, including children)

1944

- August 18, Courcelles Massacre (Courcelles, Hainaut Province; 20 People, including children)
- December, Malmedy massacres (Malmedy and surrounding region; at least 373 American POWS)
- Dec 17, Baugnez crossroads massacre (Baugnez (near Malmedy), Liège Province; 81 American POWS)
- Dec 17, Wereth massacre (Wereth, Liège Province; 11 American POWS)
- Dec 24, Bande Massacre (Bande, Luxembourg Province; 34 People aged between 17 and 32 years old)

==== Croatia ====
1943

- 30 November 1943, Ivanci massacre (73 killed)

1944

- 26-30 March 1944, Massacre of villages under Kamešnica (1,525 killed, including children)
- 30 April 1944, Lipa massacre (269 killed, including 96 children)

==== Czechoslovakia ====
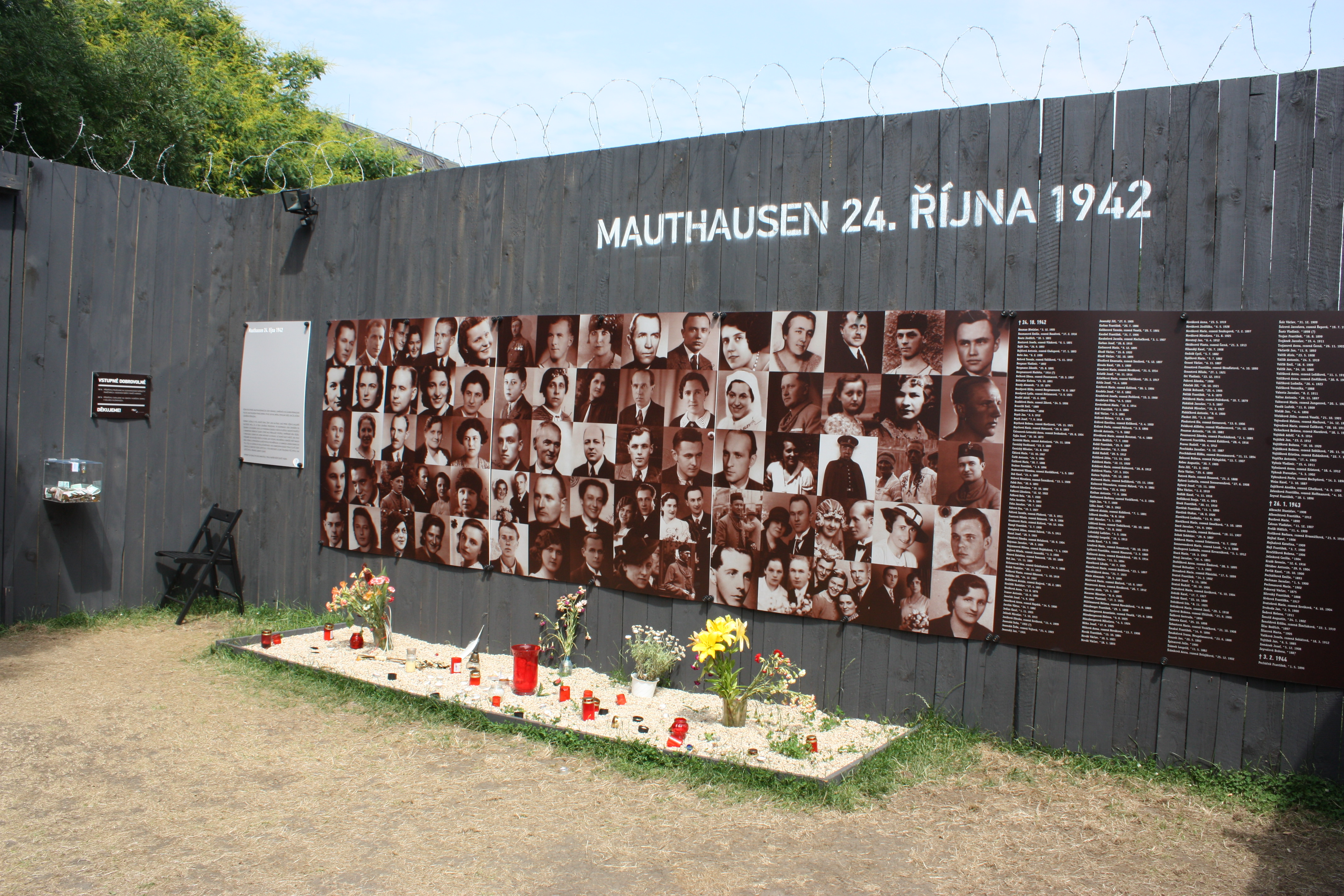
The relatives and helpers of Czech resistance fighters Jan Kubiš and Josef Valčík executed en masse on October 24, 1942

- 17 November Raid against universities and colleges
- First Martial Law (First Heydrichiada in Prague)
- First Martial Law (First Heydrichiada in Brno)
- Lidice massacre
- Ležáky massacre
- Liquidation of the Theresienstadt concentration camp
- "Transport of Death" in Brandýs nad Orlicí
- "Transport of Death" in Stod (Czech Republic)
- Jablunkov Massacre
- "Transport of Death" in Nýřany
- Killing in the Mikulov clay pit
- Murder in Gästehaus
- Ploština Massacre
- Zákřov Massacre
- Court-martial in Medlánky
- Prlov Massacre
- Salaš Massacre
- Suchý Massacre
- Letovice Massacre
- Last execution in Theresienstadt
- Execution in Lazce
- Execution in Fort XIII
- "Transport of Death" in Olbramovice
- Podbořany-Kaštice Death march
- Javoříčko Massacre
- Brandýs Tragedy
- Volary Death march
- Velké Meziříčí Massacre
- Leskovice Massacre
- Úsobská street Massacre
- Psáry Massacre
- Lednice Massacre
- Kolín massacre
- Třešť massacre
- Velké Popovice massacre
- Lahovice massacre
- Masarykovo nádraží massacre
- Massacre in Trhová Kamenice
- Malín tragedy
- Kobylisy Shooting Range, a site of execution for primarily political prisoners
- Životice massacre
- War crimes during the Prague uprising included using civilians as human shields, summary executions and massacres
- Massacre in Trhová Kamenice

==== Estonia ====
- The Holocaust in Estonia
- Murders of children by Karl Linnas

1941

- 2 November, Mass murder of children in Pärnu synagogue (34 children)

1942

- 27 March Murder of Pliner children (Holocaust in Estonia; 3 children)

==== France ====
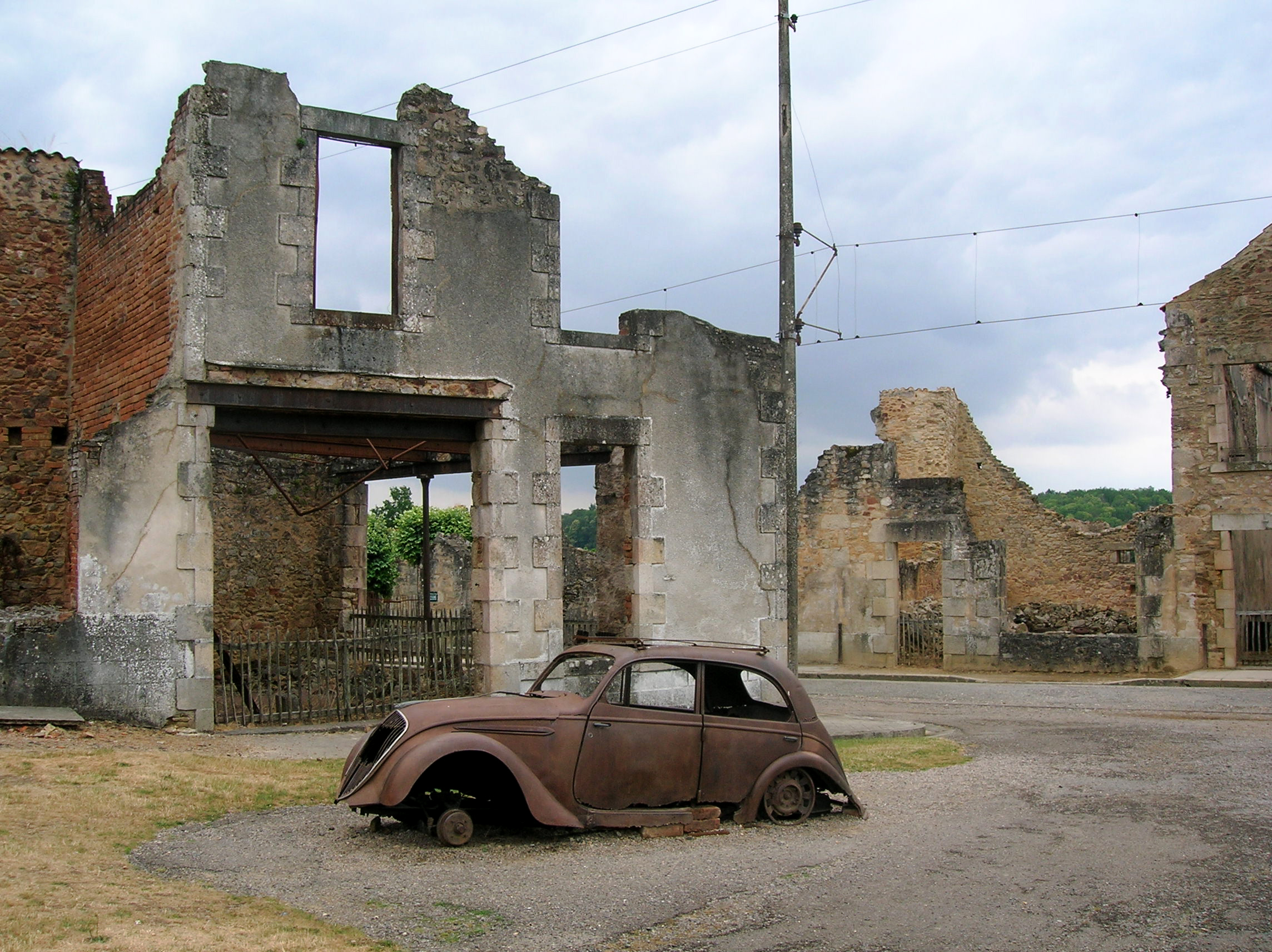
Burned out cars and buildings still litter the remains of the original village in Oradour-sur-Glane, as left by Das Reich SS division.

- Affair of 27 martyrs 25 August 1945
- Ascq massacre April 1944
- Ardenne Abbey massacre of British and Canadian troops by Waffen-SS
- Drancy internment camp murders
- Dortan Massacre
- Dun-les-Places massacre
- First Saint-Julien massacre
- Graignes massacre (Graignes, 17 American prisoners were massacred.)
- Izieu orphanage deportations to Auschwitz, 6 April 1944
- Karl Hotz reprisals
- Le Paradis massacre
- Massacre of the Bois d'Eraine
- Maillé massacre
- Penguerec massacre
- Massacre de la vallée de la Saulx
- Saint-Genis-Laval massacre
- Second Saint-Julien massacre
- Tragedy of the Guerry's wells
- Tulle massacre, 9 June 1944
- Oradour-sur-Glane massacre (642 men, women and children) 10 June 1944
- Wormhoudt massacre

==== Germany ====
- Action T4
- Murders of children in the Hadamar Clinic (NS-Tötungsanstalt Hadamar) mostly by Irmgard Huber
- Murders of children by Hans Heinze
- Otmar Freiherr von Verschuer#Involvement in Nazi human experimentation

1945

- 20–23 March - Arnsberg Forest massacre
- 8 April - Celle massacre
- 11 April - Lüneburg massacre (60–80 forced laborers)
- 13 April - Gardelegen Massacre
- 20 April - Murder of 20 children by Alfred Trzebinski
- 23 April - Treuenbrietzen massacre (127 Italian POWs)
- 26 April - Horka massacre (around 300 Polish POWs)

==== Greece ====
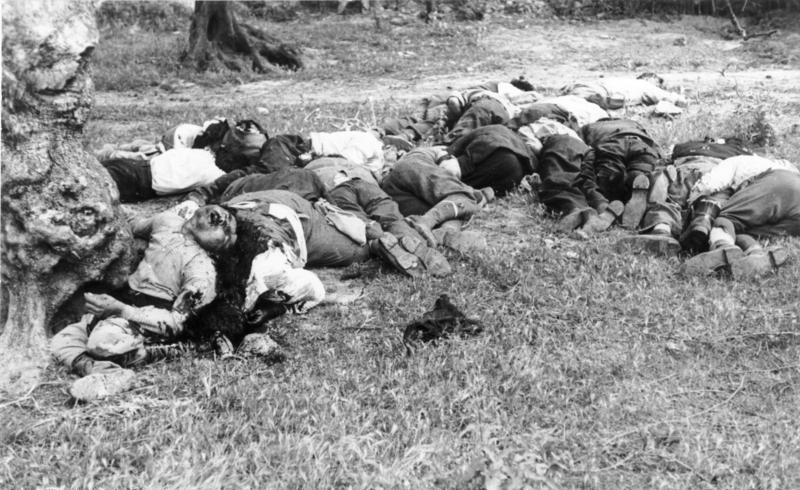
Massacre of Kondomari in Greece, June 1941

- Massacre of Kleisoura (Macedonia, 270 women and children)
- Massacre of Kondomari (Crete, 60 men, mainly elder)
- Massacre of Pikermi (Pikermi, 54, including women and children)
- Pyrgoi (former Katranitsa) massacre (Pyrgoi, 346, including women and children)
- Razing of Kandanos (Crete, 180, including women and children)
- Holocaust of Viannos (Crete, 500+, including women and children)
- Distomo massacre (Central Greece, 218, including women and children)
- Drakeia massacre (Thessaly, 118 men)
- Holocaust of Kedros (Crete, 164, including women and children)
- Massacre of Kommeno (Epirus, 317, including women and children)
- Massacre of Kalavryta (Peloponnese, 1,200+, including women and children)
- Burnings of Kali Sykia (Crete, 13, women)
- Lyngiades massacre (Epirus), 92, mostly infants, children, women and elderly
- Massacre of the Acqui Division (Kefalonia, 5,000, Italian anti-fascist troops)
- Mesovouno massacre (Macedonia, 268, including women and children)
- Paramythia executions (Epirus, 201, including women and children)
- The Massacre of Chortiatis (Macedonia, 146, including women and children)
- Executions of Kaisariani (Athens, 200+, all civilians)
- Massacre of Mousiotitsa (Epirus, 153, including women and children)
- Malathyros executions (Malathyros, 61, including women and children)
- Executions of Kokkinia (Athens, 300+, all civilians, assisted by Security Battalions)
- Kallikratis executions (Crete, 30, including women and children)
- Alikianos executions (Crete, 118, all civilians)
- Razing of Anogeia (Crete, unknown, including women and children)
- Skourvoula (Crete, at least 36, all civilians)

In addition, more than 90 villages and towns are recorded from the Hellenic network of martyr cities. During the triple German, Italian and Bulgarian, occupation about 800,000 people lost their lives in Greece (see World War II casualties).

==== Italy ====
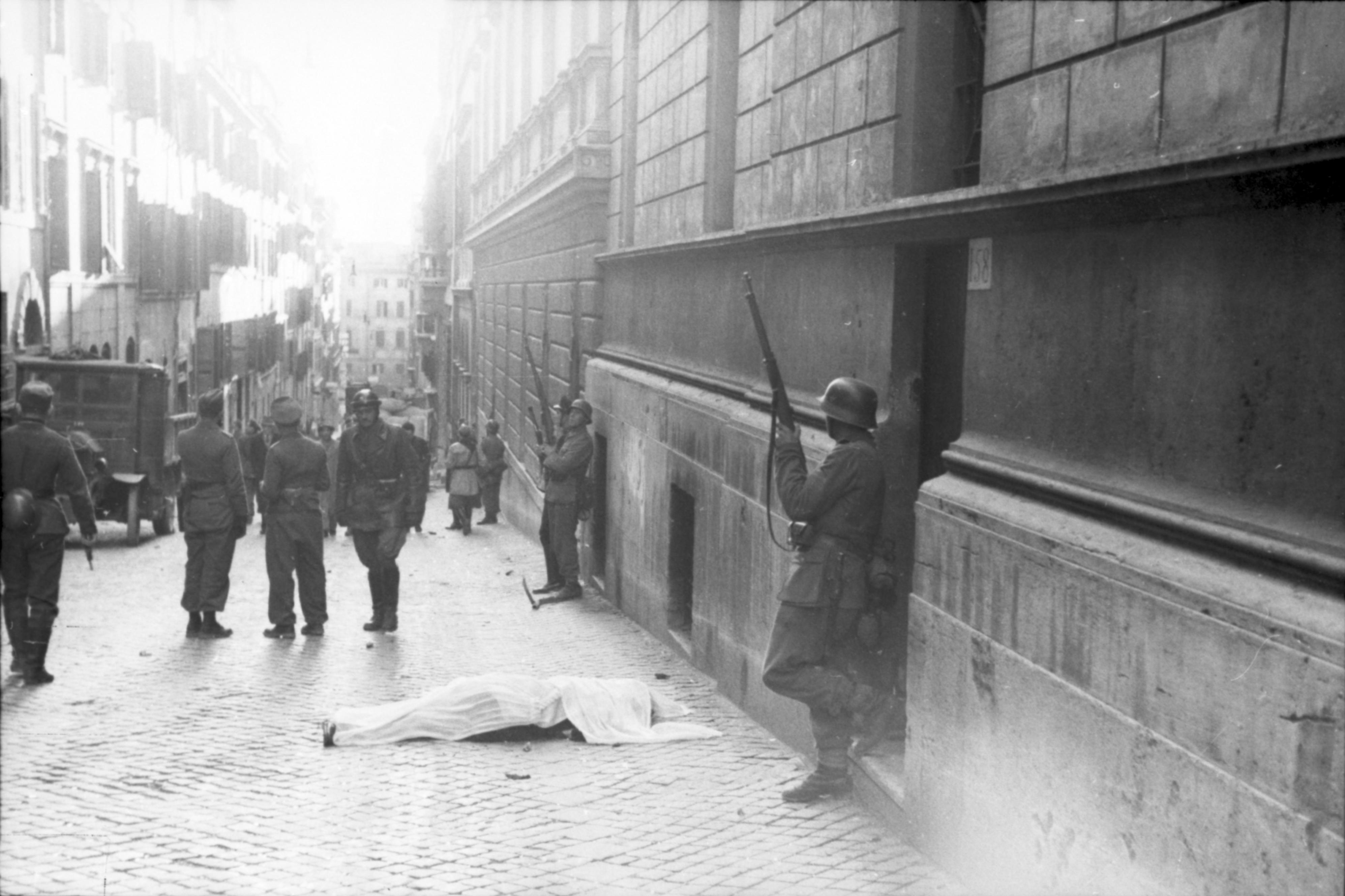
A body lies in the via Rasella, Rome, during the round up of civilians by Italian collaborationist soldiers and German troops after the partisan bombing on 13 March 1944.

- Castiglione massacre, 12–14 August 1943, Castiglione di Sicilia, 1st Fallschirm-Panzer Division Hermann Göring massacres 16 civilians and wounds 20.
- Boves massacre, 8 September 1943, Boves, Mass killing of 23 citizens (with another 22 wounded) by German 1st SS Panzer Division Leibstandarte SS Adolf Hitler occupation troops under Joachim Peiper
- Lake Maggiore massacres, September–October 1943, Lake Maggiore, Murder of 56 predominantly Italian Jews by the 1st SS Panzer Division despite strict German orders not to carry out any violence against civilians
- Caiazzo massacre, 13 October 1943, Caiazzo, Mass killing of 22 civilians by the German 29th Panzergrenadier Regiment occupation troops under Lt. Richard Heinz Wolfgang Lehnigk-Emden
- Ardeatine massacre (Rome, Lazio; 335 prisoners executed)
- Guardistallo massacre (Guardistallo, Tuscany; 46 civilians killed on 29 June 1944)
- Piazza Tasso massacre, 17 July 1944, Florence, 5 Italian civilians killed in massacre by Fascists and German Army
- 12 August 1944, Sant'Anna di Stazzema massacre (Sant'Anna di Stazzema, Tuscany; 560 people, including children)
- San Terenzo Monti massacre (Fivizzano, Tuscany; 110 civilians and 52 political prisoners killed on 21 August 1944)
- Padule di Fucecchio massacre (Fucecchio, Tuscany; 176 civilians killed on 23 August 1944)
- Vinca massacre (Fivizzano, Tuscany; between 160 and 178 civilians executed on 24 August 1944)
- Certosa di Farneta massacre (Lucca, Tuscany; 60 civilians killed between 2 and 10 September 1944)
- 29 September – 5 October 1944, Marzabotto massacre (Marzabotto, Emilia-Romagna; between 770 and 1,830 civilians killed)
- 29 June 1944, Civitella -Cornia-San Pancrazio massacre (Tuscany; 203 people, including children)
- Cuneo massacre (Cuneo, Piedmont; 189 civilians and partisans killed in two separate massacres)
- Cavriglia-Castelnuovo dei Sabbioni massacre (Tuscany; 173 civilians killed on 4 July 1944)
- Fosse del Frigido massacre (Massa, Tuscany; 146-149 prisoners murdered on 10 September 1944)
- Pietransieri massacre (Roccaraso, Abruzzo; 128 civilians killed on 21 November 1943)
- Stia massacre (Stia, Tuscany; 122 civilians killed between 12 and 15 April 1944)
- Valla massacre (Fivizzano, Tuscany; 103 civilians killed on 19 August 1944)
- Serra di Ronchidoso massacre (Gaggio Montano, Emilia-Romagna; over 100 civilians killed on 28–29 September 1944)
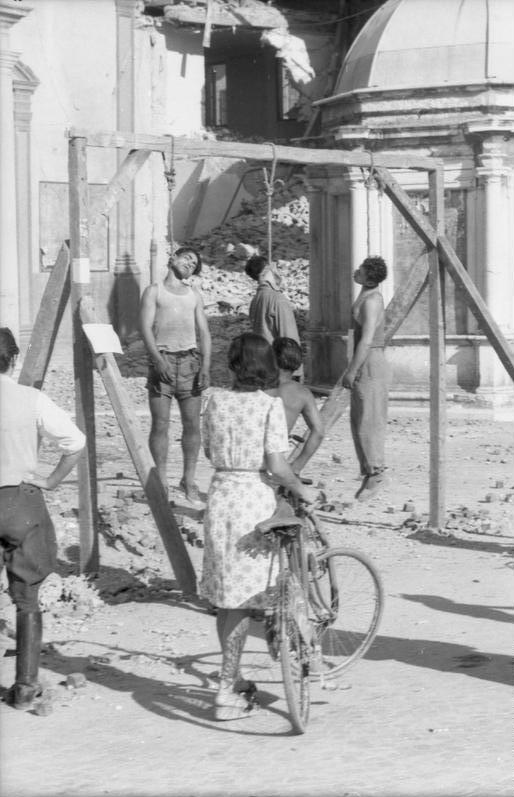
  Three men executed by public hanging in a street of Rimini, 1944
- Verghereto massacre (Verghereto, Emilia-Romagna; 96 civilians killed between 22 and 25 July 1944)
- Massacre of Monchio, Susano and Costrignano (Palagano, Emilia-Romagna; between 79 and 136 civilians killed on 18 March 1944)
- Leonessa and Cumulata massacre (Leonessa, Lazio; 51 civilians killed between 2 and 7 April 1944)
- Cumiana massacre (Cumiana, Piedmont; 51 civilians killed on 3 April 1944)
- Tavolicci massacre (Verghereto, Emilia-Romagna; 64 civilians killed on 22 July 1944)
- Forno massacre (Massa, Tuscany; 72 civilians killed on 13 June 1944)
- Gubbio massacre (Gubbio, Umbria; 40 civilians executed on 22 June 1944)
- Valdine massacre (Fivizzano, Tuscany; 52 hostages executed in August 1944)
- Casaglia massacre (Marzabotto, Emilia-Romagna; 42 civilians killed on 29 September 1944)
- Bergiola Foscalina massacre in Carrara (Carrara, Tuscany; 72 civilians killed on 16 September 1944)
- Madonna dell'Albero massacre (Ravenna, Emilia-Romagna; 56 civilians killed on 27 November 1944)
- "La Romagna" massacre (Molina di Quosa, San Giuliano Terme, Tuscany; 75 civilians killed on 11 August 1944)
- San Polo di Arezzo massacre (Arezzo, Tuscany; 65 civilians killed on 14 July 1944)
- Massaciuccoli-Massarosa massacre (Massaciuccoli, Massarosa, Tuscany; 41 civilians killed between 2 and 5 September 1944)
- Fossoli-Carpi massacre (Carpi, Emilia-Romagna; 67 civilians killed on 12 July 1944)
- Turchino Pass massacre (Fontanafredda, Liguria; 59 civilians executed on 19 May 1944)
- Pedescala massacre (Valdastico, Veneto; 82 civilians killed between 30 April and 2 May 1945)

==== Latvia ====
- The Holocaust in Latvia

1941

- 30 November and 8 December, Rumbula massacre (25,000 people, including children)

==== Lithuania ====
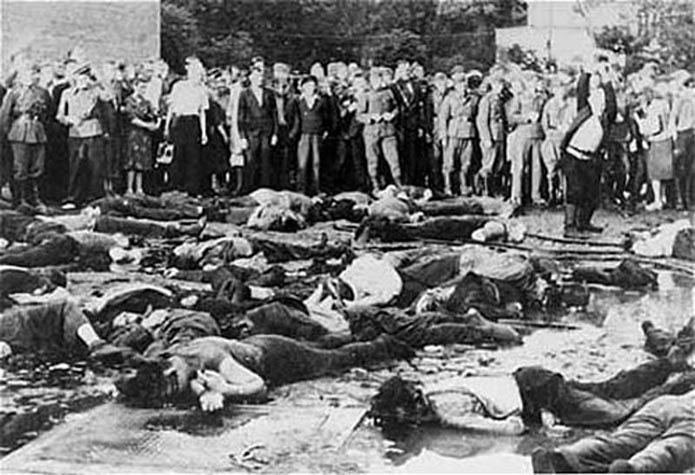
The anti-Jewish pogrom in Kaunas, in which thousands of Jews were killed in the last few days of June 1941

- The Holocaust in Lithuania

1941

- 13 July – 21 August Daugavpils massacre by Einsatzkommando 3 (9,585 people, including children)
- July–August 1944, Ponary massacre (c. 100,000 people, including children)
- 18 August – 22 August, Kreis Rasainiai massacre (1,020 children)
- 19 August, Ukmergė massacre (88 children)
- Summer-autumn-winter, Complete murder of native Jewish population in Estonia (900 individuals, including 101 children)
- 1 September, Marijampolė massacre (1,404 children)
- 2 September, Wilno massacre (817 children)
- 4 September, Čekiškė massacre (60 children)
- 4 September, Seredžius massacre (126 children)
- 4 September, Veliuona massacre (86 children)
- 4 September, Zapyškis massacre (13 children)
- 6 September – 8 September, Raseiniai massacre (415 children)
- 6 September – 8 September, Jurbork massacre (412 people, including children)
- 29 October, Kaunas massacre (4,273 children)
- 25 November, Kauen-F.IX massacre (175 children)

==== Netherlands ====
1940

- 14 May, Rotterdam bombing (nearly 1,000 people were killed and 85,000 made homeless.)

1944

- 1 October, Putten raid (552 deaths)
- 5 November, Heusden Town Hall Massacre (134 people, including 74 children)

==== Norway ====
- Attempted deportation of children of Jewish Children's Home in Oslo

==== Poland ====
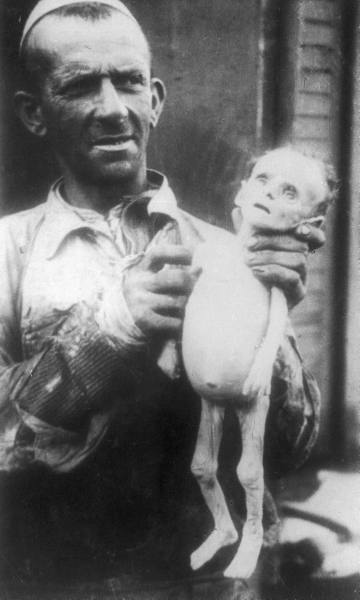
Man showing corpse of a starved infant in the Warsaw Ghetto, 1941

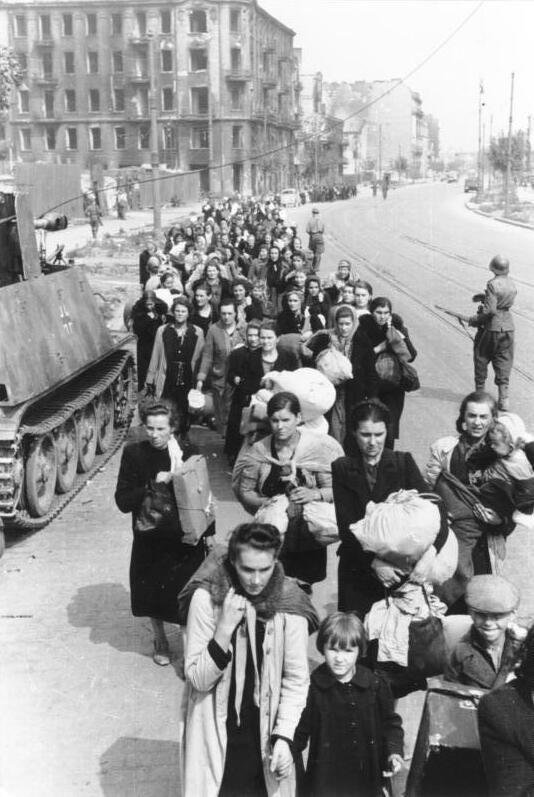
A column of Polish civilians being led by German troops through Wolska Street in early August 1944

- The Holocaust in Poland
- Expulsion of Poles by Nazi Germany
- German AB-Aktion in Poland
- German atrocities committed against Polish prisoners of war
- Gmina Aleksandrów, Lublin Voivodeship
- Gmina Besko
- Gmina Gidle
- Gmina Kłecko
- Gmina Ryczywół
- Gmina Siennica
- Intelligenzaktion, Intelligenzaktion Pommern
- Jeziorko woodland cemetery
- Kidnapping of Polish children by Nazi Germany
- Murders of children by Josef Mengele
- Pacification actions in German-occupied Poland
- Palmiry massacre
- Ponary massacre
- Operation Tannenberg
- Szczecyn massacre (71 children)
- Valley of Death (Bydgoszcz)

1939

- 1 September, Bombing of Wieluń
- 1–2 September, Torzeniec massacre (37 Poles)
- 2 September, Wyszanów massacre (24 Poles)
- 2 September, Zimnowoda and Parzymiechy massacre (113 Poles, including 30 children)
- 2–6 September, Łaziska massacre (69 Poles, including 30 children)
- 3 September, Albertów massacre (159 Poles)
- 3 September, Krzepice massacre (30 Poles)
- 3 September, Święta Anna massacre (29 Poles)
- 3 September, Świekatowo massacre (26 Poles)
- 3 September, Mysłów massacre (22 Poles, including 10 children)
- 3 September, Pińczyce massacre (20 Poles)
- 4 September, Katowice massacre (about 80 Poles)
- 4 September, Złoczew massacre (200 Poles and Jews)
- 4 September, Pasternik massacre (29 Poles)
- 4 September, Cielętniki massacre (28 Poles, including four children)
- 4 September, Kruszyna massacre (dozens of Poles, including 10 children)
- 4–6 September, Częstochowa massacre
- 5 September, Kajetanowice massacre (over 70 Poles, including ten children under the age of 16)
- 5 September, Serock massacre (over 80 Polish POWs)
- 5–6 September, Krasnosielc massacre (50 Jews)
- 6, 8 September, Uniejów massacre (50 people)
- 6, 9 September, Będzin massacres (20 Poles and 100 Jews)
- 7 September, Wylazłów massacre (24 Poles)
- 8 September, Ciepielów massacre (around 300 Polish POWs)
- 8 September, Tyszki massacre (33 Poles)
- 8 September, Chechło massacre, near Pabianice (30 Poles)
- 8 September, Dominikowice massacre (23 Poles)
- 8 September, Balin massacre (21 Poles)
- 8–9 September, Lipsko massacre (66 people)
- 8, 11 September, Mszczonów massacre (11 Polish POWs and 20 Polish civilians)
- 9 September, Sławków massacre (98 Jews)
- 9 September, Wyszków massacre (65+ Jews)
- 9–10 September, Łęczyca massacre (29 Poles)
- 10 September, Rawa Mazowiecka massacre (40 people)
- 10 September, Zdziechowa massacre (24 Poles)
- 10 September, Bądków massacre (22 Poles, including a 14-year-old boy)
- 10 September, Piaseczno massacre of 1939 (21 Polish POWs)
- 10 September, Stare Rogowo massacre (21 Poles)
- 10 September, Gniazdowo massacre (around 20 Poles)
- 10 September, Laski Szlacheckie massacre (20 Poles)
- 11 September, Karczew massacre (75 Poles)
- 11 September, Skierniewice massacre (60 people)
- 11 September, Obora massacre (22 Poles)
- 11 September, Niewolno massacre (18 Poles)
- 12 September, Szczucin massacre (around 40 Polish POWs and around 30 Polish civilians)
- 12 September, Parma massacre (32 Poles)
- 12 September, Koźmice Wielkie massacre (32 Jews)
- 13 September, Łowicz massacre (21 people)
- 13–14 September, Zambrów massacre (over 200 Polish POWs)
- 14 September, Olszewo massacre (30 Polish POWs and 23 civilians)
- 15 September, Sulejówek massacre (over 90 Poles)
- 16 September, Retki massacre (22 Poles)
- 17 September, Henryków massacre (76 Poles, including women and children)
- 17 September, Leszno massacre (around 50 Poles)
- 18 September, Śladów massacre (around 300 Poles, including POWs, refugees, women and children)
- 19–21 September, Gąbin massacre (20 Poles)
- 20 September, Majdan Wielki massacre (42 Polish POWs)
- 22 September, Boryszew massacre (50 Polish POWs)
- 28 September, Zakroczym massacre (around 600 Poles, mostly POWs)
- 1 October, Szczuczki massacre (64 Poles, including ten boys)
- 7 November, Dalki massacre (24 Poles)
- 11 November, Ostrów Mazowiecka massacre (up to 600 Jews)

1940

- 18 January, Piotrowice massacre (39 Poles)
- 3–4 April, Dąbrówka Mała massacre (40 Poles)
- 4 April, Celiny massacre (29 Poles)
- 11 April, Skłoby massacre (265 Poles, including women and children)

1941

- Nowosiółki massacre (several hundred)
- 1941 Białystok massacres (6,500 people)
- Lviv pogroms
- July, Massacre of Lwów professors (45 Polish professors)

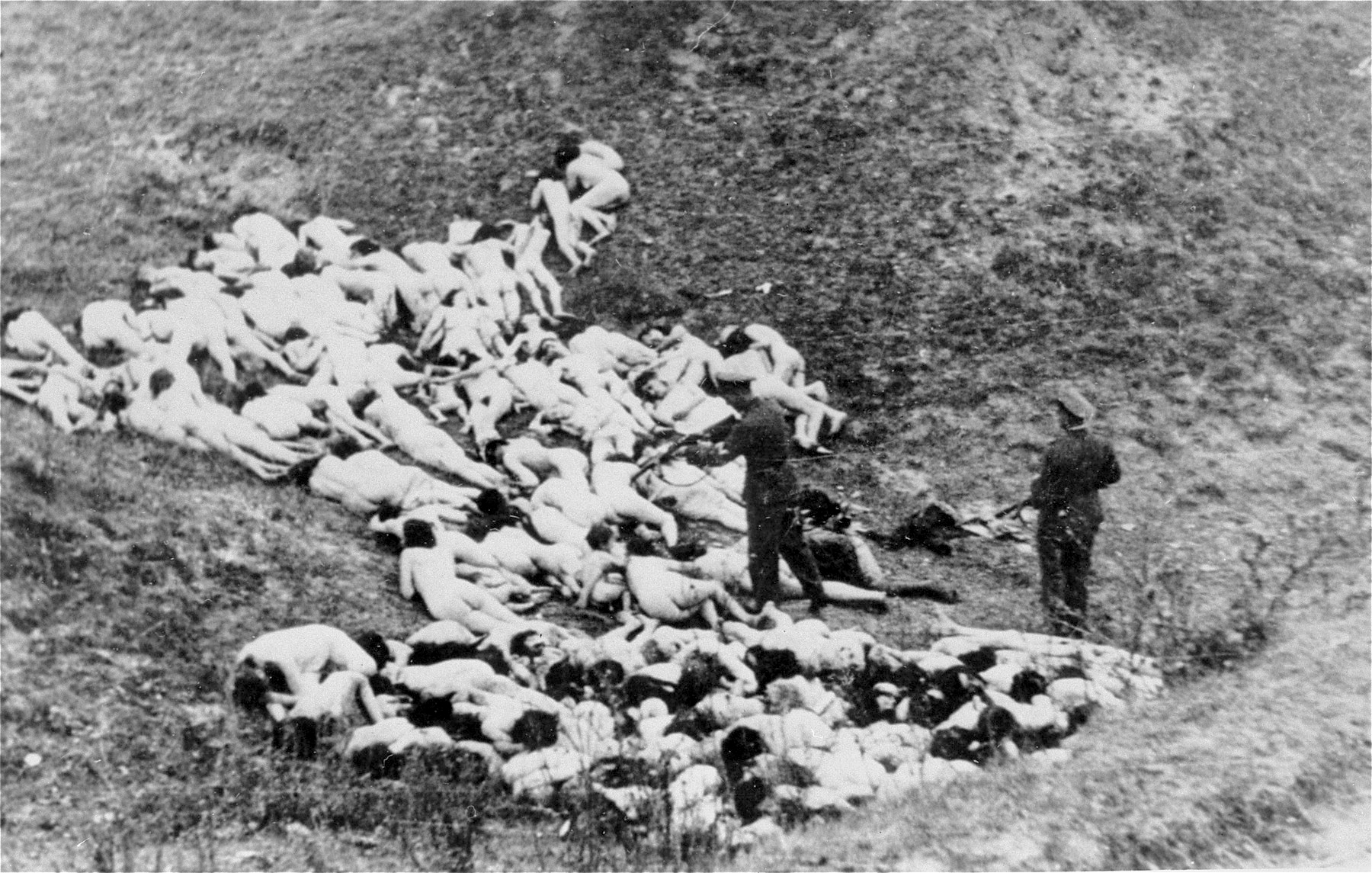
German police shooting women and children from the Mizocz Ghetto, 14 October 1942

1942

- ca. 15 June, Wodzisław massacre of 1942 (50 Jews)
- 2 July, murder of children of Lidice in the Kulmhof extermination camp (82 children)
- 16 July, Rajsk massacre (142 people)
- 6 October, Nowy Bidaczów massacre (22 Poles)
- 6 December, Stary Ciepielów and Rekówka massacre (31 Poles, including children, and two Jews)
- 11 December, Kitów massacre (164+ Poles, including women and children)

1943

- January, Samoklęski massacre (27 Jews and one Pole)
- 12 March, Murder of Czesława Kwoka in KZ Auschwitz-Birkenau (1 child)
- 18 May, Szarajówka massacre (58–67 Poles, including women and children)
- 23 May, Kielce cemetery massacre (45 children)
- 24 June, Majdan Nowy massacre (28–36 Poles)
- 28 June, Cegłów massacre (26 Poles and an unknown number of Jews; including women and children)
- 3 July, Majdan Stary massacre (75 Poles, including women and children)
- 4 July, Liszki massacre (30 Poles)
- 12–13 July, Michniów massacre (at least 204 killed, including 48 children)
- 13 July, Sikory-Tomkowięta massacre (49 Poles)
- 13 July, Łysa Góra massacre, near Zawady (58 Poles)
- 17 July, Krasowo-Częstki massacre (257 people, including 83 children)
- 21 July, Wnory-Wandy massacre (32 Poles)
- 21 July, Radwanowice massacre (30 Poles)
- 2 August, Jasionowo massacre (58 Poles, including 19 children)
- 3 August, Szczurowa massacre (93 people, including children)
- 29 September, Ostrówki massacre (246 children)
- 29 September, Wola Ostrowiecka massacre (220 children)
- September–October, Wodzisław massacre of 1943 (318 Jews)

1944

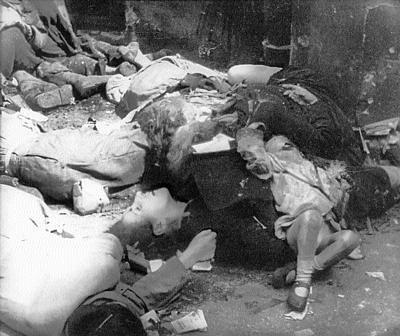
Film footage taken by the Polish Underground showing the bodies of women and children murdered by SS troops in Warsaw, August 1944

- 2 February, Borów massacre (including 103 children)
- 28 February, Huta Pieniacka massacre
- 28 February, Wanaty massacre (108 Poles, including 35 women and 47 children)
- 8 March, Jabłoń-Dobki massacre (91 Poles, including 31 women and 31 children)
- 8 March, Jamy massacre (152 Poles, including women and children)
- 1 June, Sochy massacre (181–200 Poles)
- 2 June, Murder of Yekusiel Yehudah Halberstam's children (9 children)
- 5 June, Olszanka massacre (around 100 people)
- 22 July, Lublin Castle massacre (over 300 Poles and Jews)
- 2 August, Mokotów Prison Massacre (c. 600 Poles)
- 4 August, Nur massacre (around 120 Poles)
- 4–25 August, Ochota massacre (c. 10,000 people, including children)
- 5–8 August, Wola massacre (40,000 up to 100,000 people, including children)
- 31 August, Małaszek massacre (over 30 Poles, including women and children)
- 2 September, Lipniak-Majorat massacre (around 450 Poles, including women and children)
- Planned destruction of Warsaw
- 23 December, Bloody Christmas Eve in Ochotnica Dolna (56 Poles, including 19 children and 21 women)
- 31 December, Nieławice massacre (56 Poles, including children)

1945

- 21–22 January, Marchwacz massacre (63 Polish civilians, 12 Soviet POWs)
- 31 January, Podgaje massacre (160–210 Polish POWs)
- 9 February, Leśno massacre (64 Jewish women)

==== Russia ====
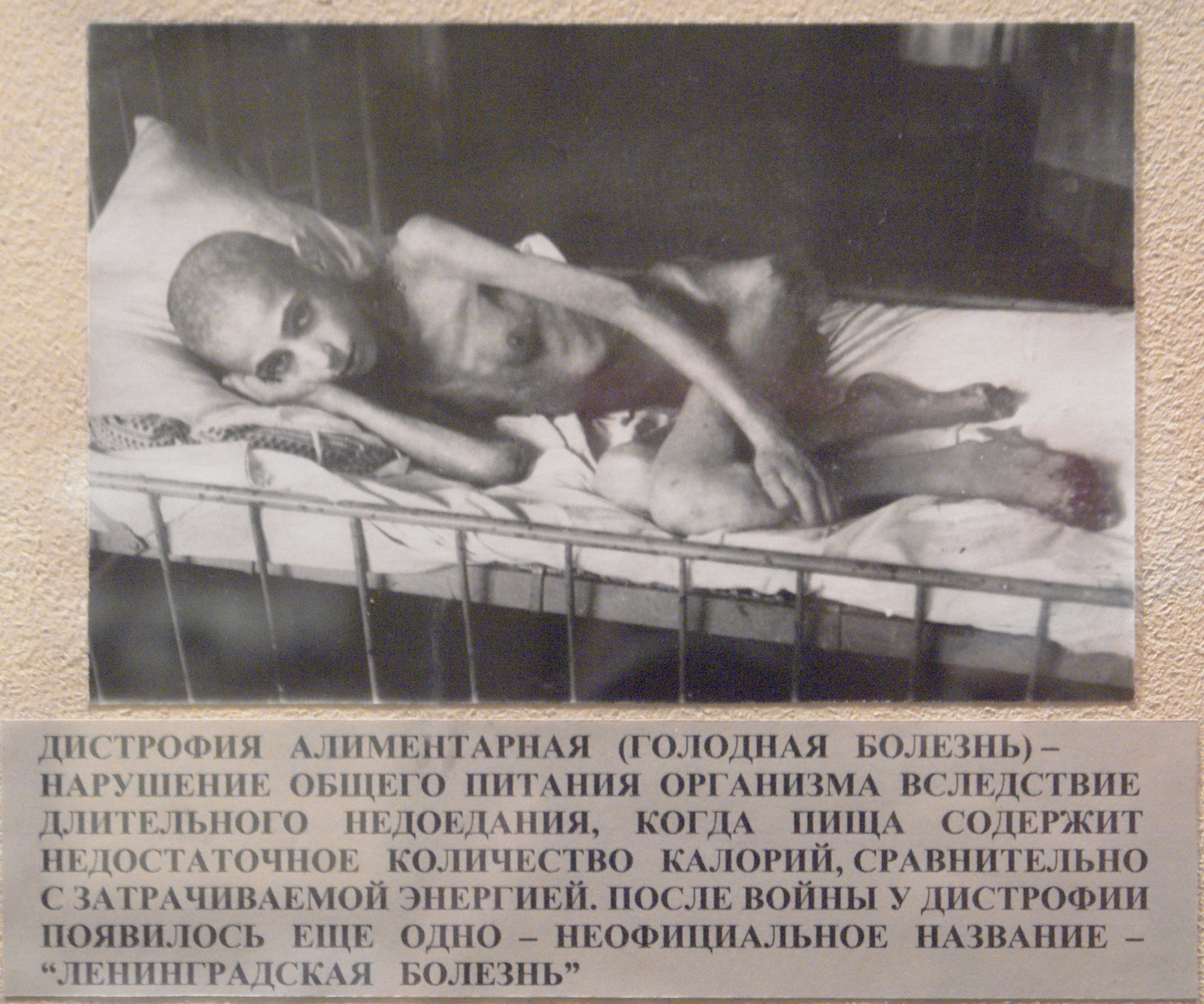
A victim of starvation in besieged Leningrad in 1941

- The Holocaust in Russia
- Commissar Order
- World War II German war crimes in the Soviet Union
- German war crimes during the Battle of Moscow

==== Serbia ====
1941

- 20–21 October Kragujevac massacre (2,778–2,794 civilians killed, including 217 children)
- 15-20 October Kraljevo massacre (2000 civilians killed)

==== Slovenia ====
1942

- 22 July Celje prison massacre (Celje, 100 civilians killed)
- 2 October Maribor prison massacre (Maribor, 143 civilians killed)

1945

- 12 February Frankolovo crime (Frankolovo, 100 civilians killed)

==== Ukraine ====
- The Holocaust in Ukraine
- Babi Yar
  - List of victims of the Babi Yar massacre
- Massacres of Poles in Volhynia

1941

- June, Czechow massacre (6 children)
- June–July, Lviv pogroms
- August 27–28, Kamianets-Podilskyi massacre; 23,600 people (including women and children)
- September 5, Pavoloch massacre; 1,500 people (including women and children)
- September 16–30, Mykolaiv massacre; 35,782 people (including women and children)
- 29–30 September, Babi Jar massacre (33,771 people, including children: List of victims of the Babi Yar massacre)
- October 5, Berdychiv massacre, 20,000–38,536 people (including women and children)
- October 22–24, 1941 Odesa massacre, 125,000-134,000 people (including women and children)
- December 15, Drobitsky Yar, 16,000 people (including women and children)

1943

- 11 January, Artemivsk massacre (1,317–3,000 Jews)
- 1–2 March, Koriukivka massacre
- 19 March, Ozerjany massacre (267 people).
- Second half of March, Kharkov massacre following the Third Battle of Kharkov (2500 people).
- 29 September, Wola Ostrowiecka massacre (220 children)
- 10 December, Tarassiwka massacre; 400 people (including women and children)

1944

- 28 February, Huta Pieniacka massacre
- 28–29 February, Korosciatyn Massacre (c. 150 people, including children)

== See also ==
- Anti-German sentiment
- German nationalism
- Pan-Germanism
- Military history of Germany
- Nazism
- Nazi Party
- Nazi Germany
- Nazi crime
- Nazi eugenics
- Nazi racial theories
- Racial policy of Nazi Germany
- Victims of Nazi Germany
- Consequences of Nazism
- Racism in Germany
- War crimes of the Wehrmacht
- Bombing of Guernica
- Chronicles of Terror
- Command responsibility
- Einsatzgruppen
- Gestapo
- Luftwaffe
- Generalplan Ost
- Hunger Plan
- Lebensraum
- New Order (Nazism)
- Nazi concentration camps
- Jewish ghettos established by Nazi Germany
- Italian war crimes
- Japanese war crimes
- Internment of German Americans
- Internment of Italian Americans
- Internment of Japanese Americans
- Internment of Japanese Canadians
- List of Axis personnel indicted for war crimes
- List of war crimes
- Nazi war crimes in occupied Poland during World War II
- Pacification actions in German-occupied Poland
- Schutzstaffel
- Nuremberg trials
- International Military Tribunal for the Far East
- War crimes in occupied Poland during World War II
- Allied war crimes during World War II
- T-4 euthanasia program
- Allied war crimes during World War II
- British war crimes
- Soviet war crimes
- United States war crimes
- German support for the Gaza genocide
- Josef Mengele
- Commissar Order
- Anti-Jewish legislation in pre-war Nazi Germany
- Nuremberg Laws
- Barbarossa Decree
- German atrocities committed against Polish prisoners of war
- Irma Grese
- Oignies and Courrières massacre
- Massacre of the Acqui Division
- Kraljevo massacre
- Kragujevac massacre
- Heinrich Himmler
- Joseph Goebbles
- Flight and expulsion of Germans (1944–1950)
- World War I casualties
- World War II casualties
