= Jeziorko woodland cemetery =

Cemetery in Jeziorko, Poland

Coordinates: 53°14′00″N 22°11′39″E

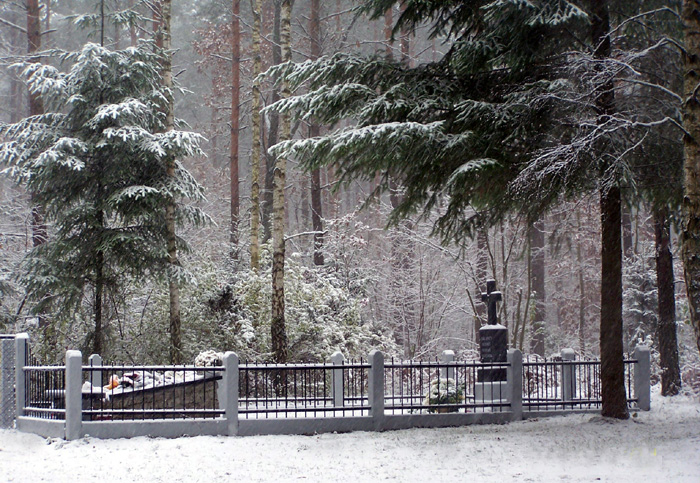
Woodland cemetery Jeziorko in Winter season

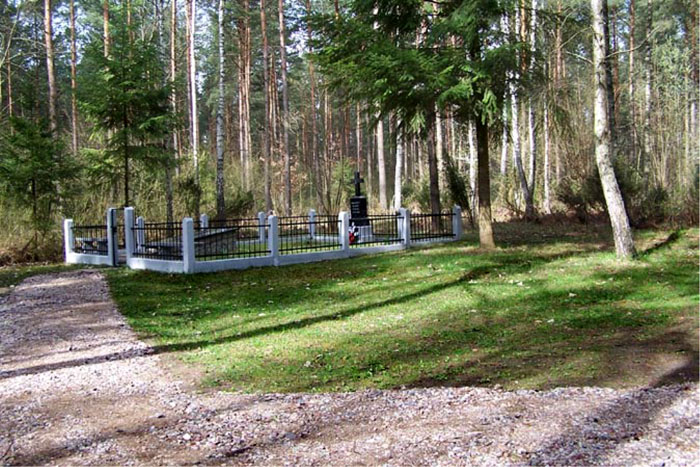
Woodland cemetery Jeziorko in Summer season

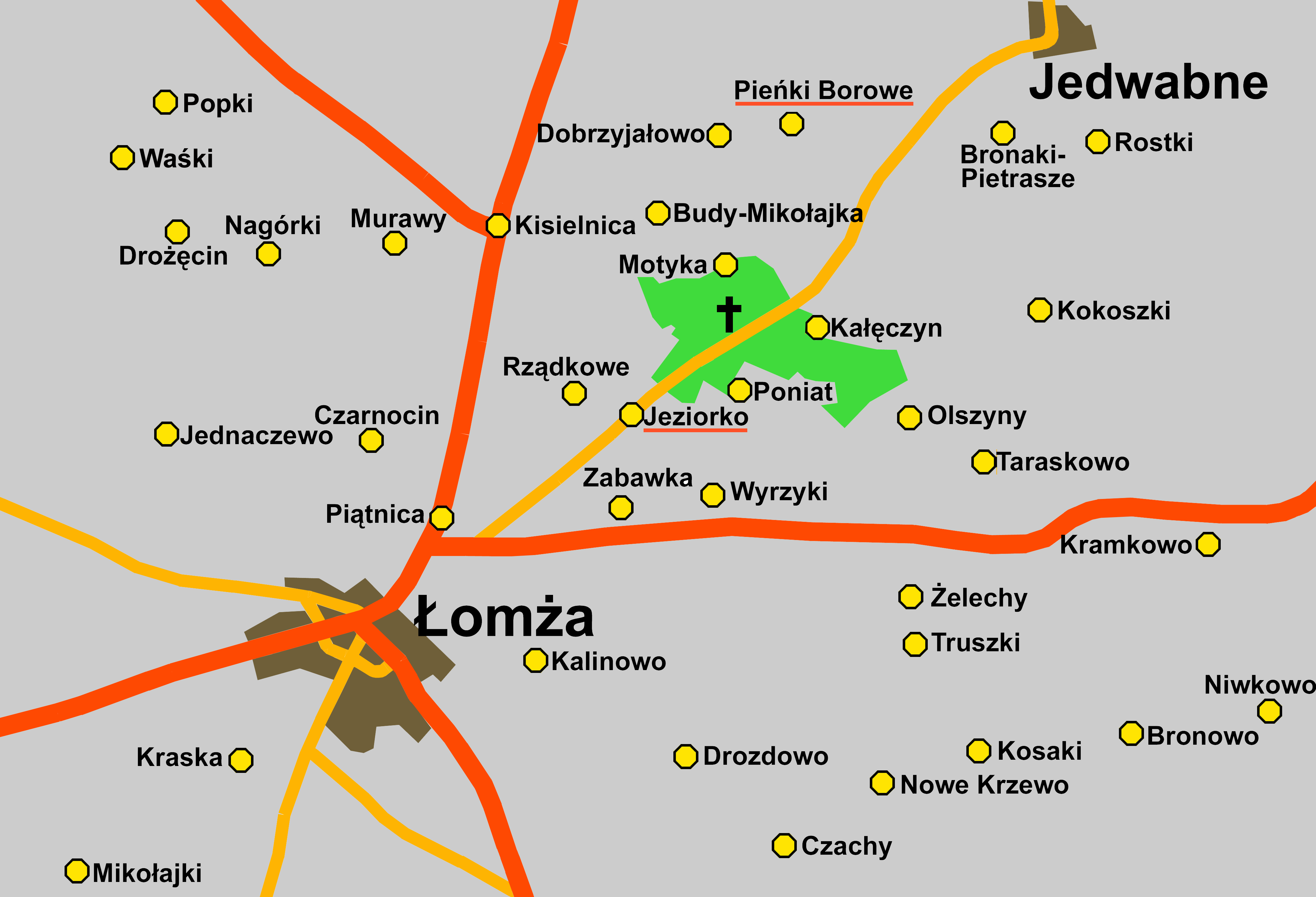
Site map of the Jeziorko war victims cemetery

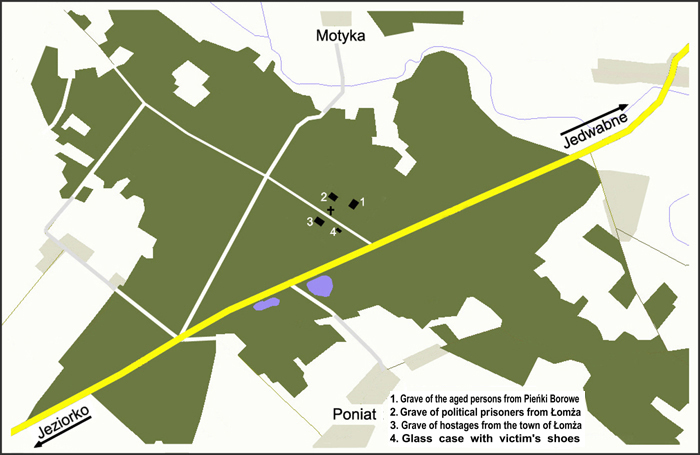
Site plan of the cemetery

Woodland cemetery in Jeziorko village in the Northeastern part of Poland is located approximately 7 kilometers (4.3 mi) from the town of Łomża along Route 668. The remains of victims murdered by the Nazi troops rest in the cemetery which is among very few with almost completely documented history of events that happened during the Nazi occupation.

Three mass graves are related to three executions that took place there. First, in June 1942 (the exact date is still unknown), approximately 60 elderly people from a nursing home of nearby Pieńki Borowe were murdered. The names of 13 victims were identified with the majority still remaining unknown. Second, on the night of June 29/30, 1943, the military police executed 62 political prisoners transported to the Jeziorko forest from the prison in Łomża. The third grave is a burial site of 52 victims, including children and elderly, members of more than a dozen of families arrested as hostages in their homes in Łomża at dawn on July 15, 1943. They were taken to the prison and then transported to the Jeziorko forest where they were executed. The execution was carried out by a special unit known as the Müller group (after the name of its commander) created by Erich Koch, the East Prussia Gauleiter, i.e., a district leader in Nazi Germany who served as a provincial governor.

In autumn of 1944, a German unit (Sonderkommando 1005) exhumed the corpses and burned them to obliterate the evidence of the murders.

In spring of 1945, after Nazi forces left the Łomża region, the cemetery in the Jeziorko forest with three mass graves was created by the efforts of inhabitants of Łomża. In 2005, the Council for the Protection of Struggle and Martyrdom Sites acknowledged the cemetery as the Site of National Remembrance.
