= Ostrówki massacre =

1943 mass murder of Poles

Coordinates: 51.261017°N 23.882174°E

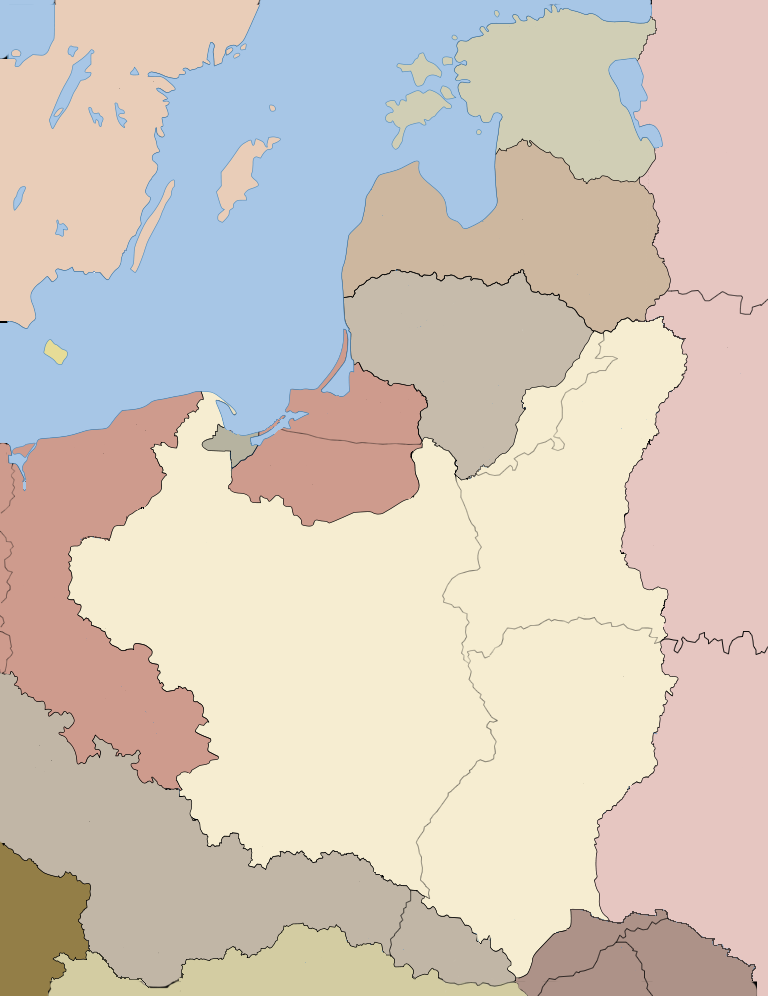
- Location of the Massacre (map of Second Polish Republic from before the German-Soviet invasion of 1939)
- Location: Ostrówki, Volhynian Voivodeship, occupied Poland
- Date: 30 August 1943
- Target: Poles
- Attack type: Shooting and stabbing
- Weapons: Axes, bludgeons
- Deaths: 438
- Perpetrator: Ukrainian Insurgent Army
- Motive: Anti-Catholicism, Anti-Polish sentiment, Greater Ukraine, Ukrainisation

The Ostrówki massacre was a 1943 mass murder of the Polish inhabitants of the Volhynian village of Ostrówki, located in the gmina Hushcha, Liuboml (Polish: Huszcza, Luboml), Volhynian Voivodeship in the Second Polish Republic (now known as Ostrowky, located in the Kamin-Kashyrskyi Raion of Volyn Oblast, Ukraine). On 30 August 1943, armed members of the Ukrainian Insurgent Army (UIA) murdered 438 Poles. Among the victims were 246 children under the age of 14.

On the same day, the nationalists of the Ukrainian Insurgent Army murdered 529 Poles in the neighboring village of Wola Ostrowiecka (see Massacre of Wola Ostrowiecka). After the massacre, Ostrówki was burned to the ground after its goods were looted. In September 1943, a commandant, surnamed Lysiy, of the local UIA, reported to the UIA's headquarters: "I have carried out the operation in the villages of Wola Ostrowiecka and Ostrovky (sic). I have liquidated all Poles, from the youngest to the oldest ones. I burnt all buildings, and appropriated all goods."

== The particulars ==
The massacres followed a scheme similar to other such events in the area. The village was surrounded by Ukrainians armed with firearms, knives, axes and pitchforks. All Poles were ordered to assemble at a local school, to discuss ways of fighting the Germans. Males were then murdered, followed by women, girls, and then small children. All bodies were then thrown into a pit. Those Poles who remained, were locked in the school, where they either burned alive, or were murdered with grenades.

At some point during the massacre, which began at 10 a.m., German soldiers came to investigate the village. Their arrival spurred the murderers to hurry, and a number of women and children were killed in a nearby field. After the Germans left, the Ukrainians began calling out in Polish that the area was clear. Those who responded to the subterfuge were murdered.

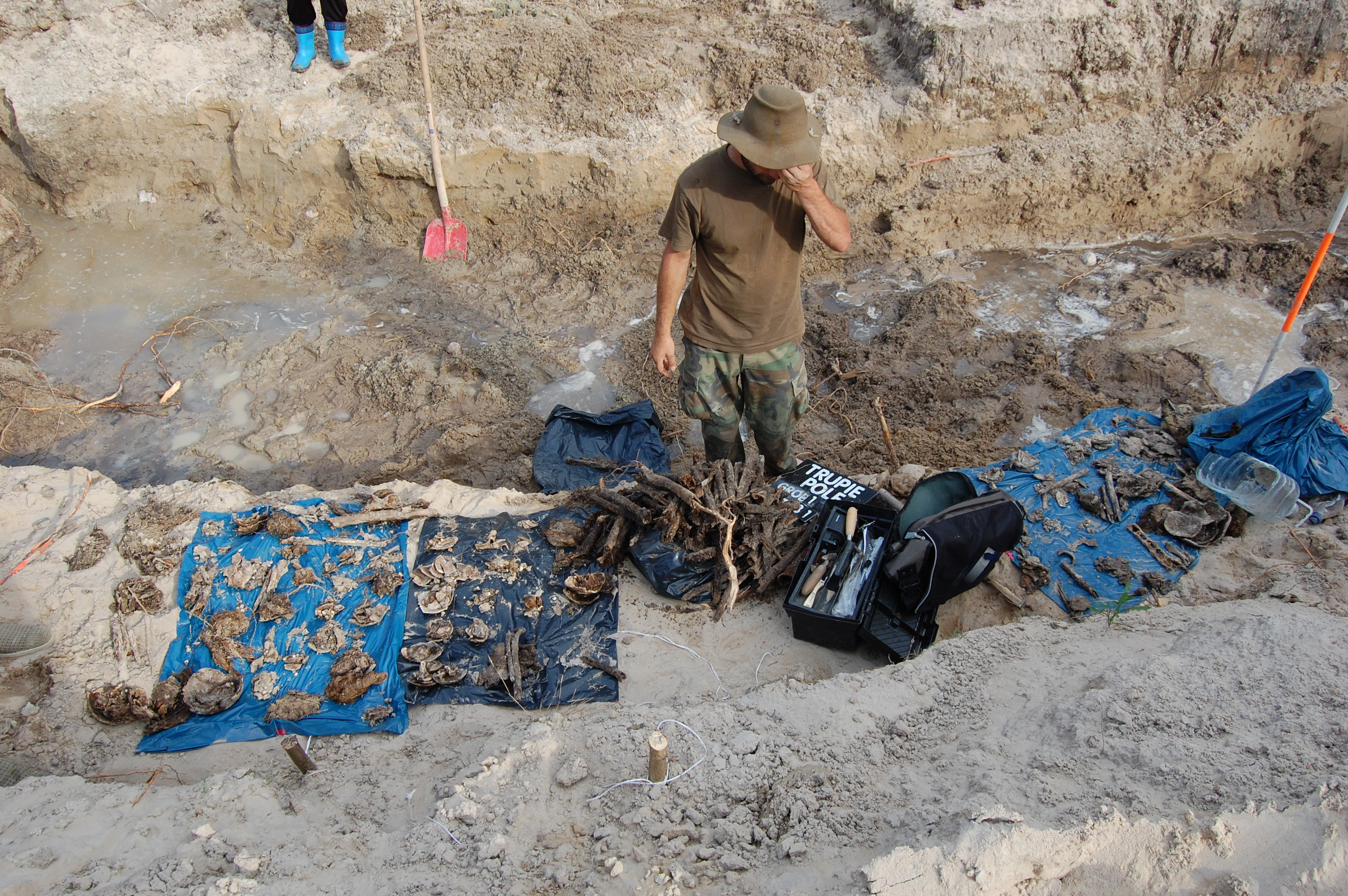
The second exhumation in Ostrówki (August 2011)

Polish survivors of the massacre and their families organized the first trip to Ostrówki/Ostrowky in 1990. They met with inhabitants of the neighboring Ukrainian village of Sokil, none of whom wished to talk about it. Tomasz Trisiuk, a Polish survivor of the massacre who was 13 at the time, remembered that most of the victims were murdered with hammers and axes. Another survivor, Helena Popek, who was then 20, stated that the UIA at first pretended to be friendly, giving out candy to children and telling the Poles to calm down.

On 17 August 1992, an exhumation took place; Polish scientists of the Medical Academy from Lublin found 330 bodies, which were reburied on 30 August 1992, the 49th anniversary of the massacre, in a local cemetery. In 2003, a metal cross with a small chapel dedicated to Virgin Mary were erected here.

== See also ==
- Historiography of the Massacre of Poles in Volhynia
- Massacres of Poles in Volhynia
