= Wola Ostrowiecka massacre =

1943 Ukrainian Insurgent Army killing of Poles

Massacre of Wola Ostrowiecka
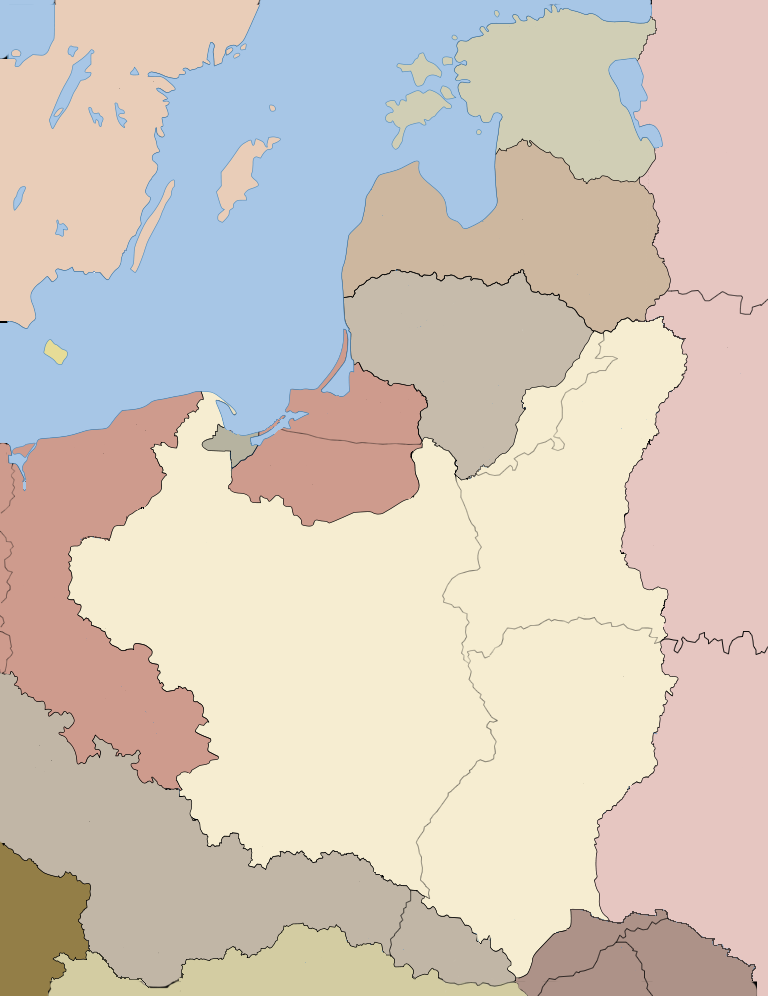
- Location of the Massacre (map of the Second Polish Republic from before the German-Soviet invasion of 1939)
- Location: 51°17′50″N 23°55′2″E; Wola Ostrowiecka, Volhynian Voivodeship, occupied Poland
- Date: 30 August 1943
- Target: Poles
- Attack type: Shooting and stabbing
- Weapons: Axes, bludgeons
- Deaths: 529
- Perpetrator: Ukrainian Insurgent Army
- Motive: Anti-Catholicism, Anti-Polish sentiment, Greater Ukraine, Ukrainisation

Massacre of Wola Ostrowiecka was a 1943 mass murder of Polish inhabitants of the village of Wola Ostrowiecka located in the prewar gmina Huszcza in Luboml County (powiat lubomelski) of the Volhynian Voivodeship, within the Second Polish Republic. Wola Ostrowiecka no longer exists. It was burned to the ground during the Massacres of Poles in Volhynia and Eastern Galicia.

The perpetrators were nationalists of the Ukrainian Insurgent Army's territorial command Piwnicz, aided by local Ukrainian peasants. On 30 August 1943, the Ukrainians surrounded the village, and began murdering the Polish inhabitants. Altogether, 79 families were murdered in their entirety, and in another 37 families, only one family member survived. Polish sociologist and researcher Tadeusz Piotrowski puts the number of murdered Poles at 529, out of total village's population of 870. On the same day, Ukrainian nationalists murdered 438 Poles in the neighboring village of Ostrowki (see Massacre of Ostrowki).

== Account of the massacre ==
According to the Polish survivors, the perpetrators had been preparing the attack for a few days in advance. The Poles noticed that their Ukrainian neighbors were drinking heavily, and chanting anti-Polish slogans. On the morning of 29 August, the Ukrainians surrounded the village. At first, they acted in a friendly way, talking to children, and asking men to gather in a square in front of the school. A Ukrainian Insurgent Army officer made a speech, in which he urged Poles to fight the Germans, alongside the Ukrainians. At the same time, on the outskirts of the village, pits for dead bodies had already been dug. After the speech, all Polish men were asked to come for “physical examination” in a barn, one by one; they were killed by blows to the head with a blunt object.

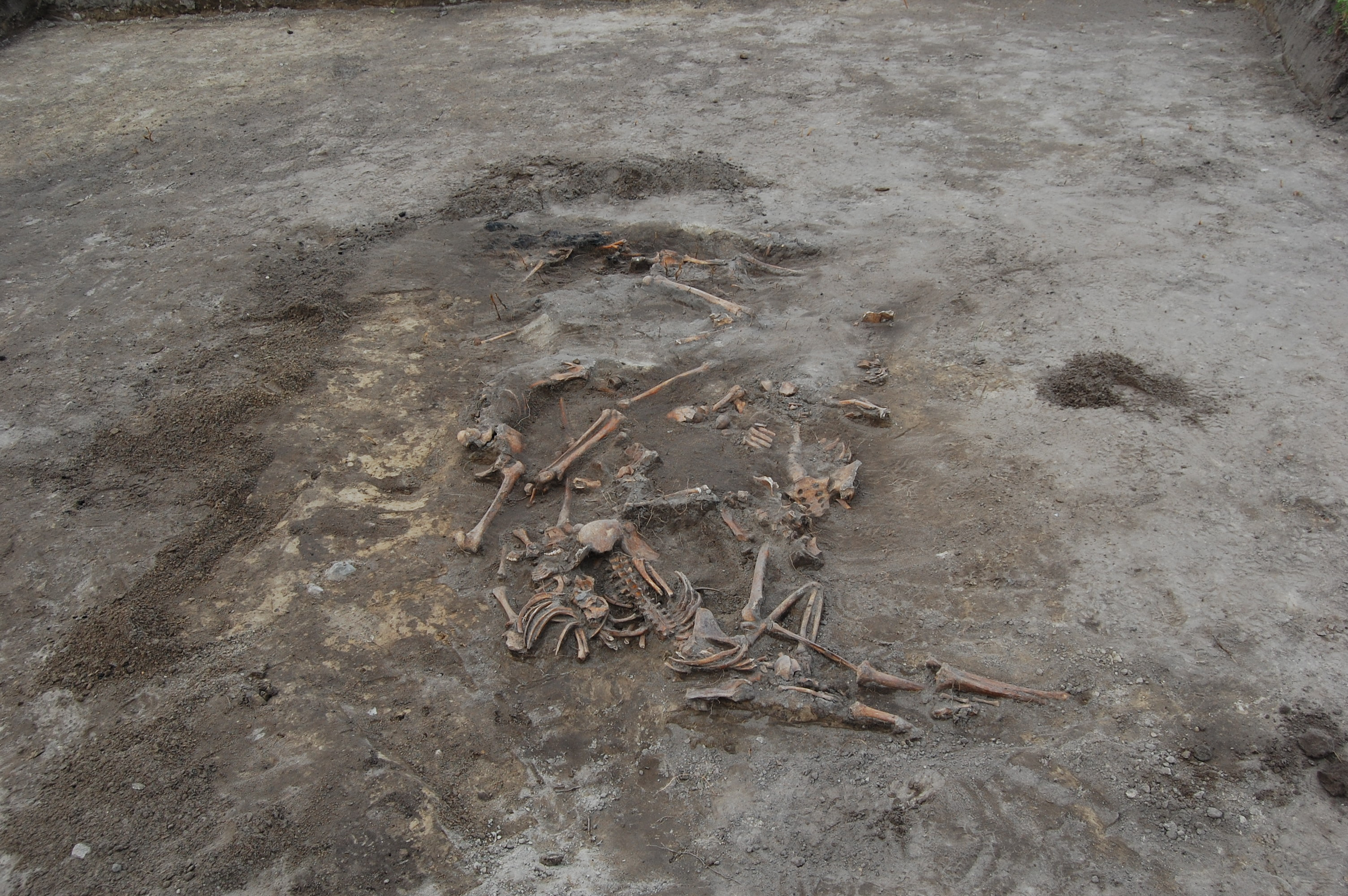
The mass grave discovered during the second exhumation in Wola Ostrowiecka (in August 2011 by Polish anthropologist Dr Leon Popek)

Once all the men had been killed, the women and children were locked in the school building. One of the survivors, a young girl named Marianna Soroka, later recounted that they began singing hymns, and their mother told them to prepare for death. Another survivor, Henryk Kloc, who was 13, stated that the Ukrainians set fire to the school, and then began firing at it and throwing grenades inside. Kloc, heavily wounded, lay among the dying in a school orchard, and watched the murderers kill the five-year-old son of Maria Jesionek. The boy's mother had already been killed, and her son was sitting next to her, asking her to go home. “Suddenly an armed Ukrainian came to him, and shot the boy in the head”. Kloc himself only survived because he played dead. As soon as the massacre ended, local Ukrainian peasants began looting the village. After the massacre, the commander of the Ukrainian Insurgent Army's unit reported: “On August 29, I carried out the action in villages of Wola Ostrowiecka and Ostrówki. I liquidated all Poles, from the youngest to the oldest ones. I burnt all buildings, and appropriated all goods.”

== Archaeological studies ==
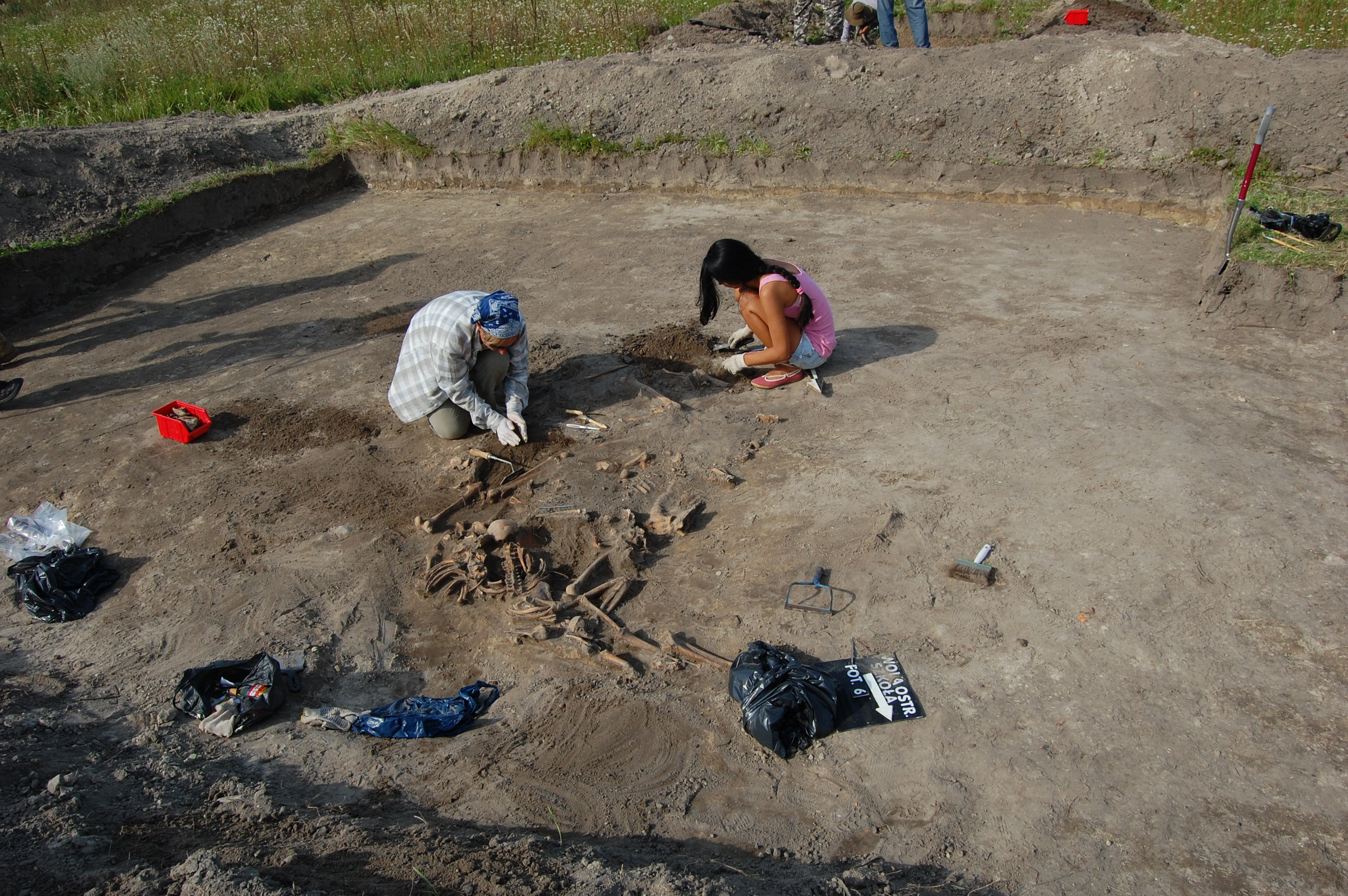
Exhumation in progress

Between 17 and 22 August 1992, Polish scientists carried out exhumation in the area where the village once stood. During the exhumation, it was established that in most cases, the murderers used of the head of an axe or a bludgeon. Wola Ostrowiecka no longer exists. Local Ukrainians call the village the Field of Dead Bodies. Every year, Polish survivors and their families organise a pilgrimage. In 2003, the village was going to be the center of commemorations of the 60th anniversary of the Massacres of Poles in Volhynia. However, at the last moment, plans were changed, and presidents Aleksander Kwasniewski, and Leonid Kuchma went to Poryck instead.
