= Pieńki Borowe =

- Village
- Location within Poland
- Coordinates: 53°17′N 22°14′E
- Country: Poland
- Voivodeship: Podlaskie
- County: Łomża
- Gmina: Jedwabne
- Time zone: UTC+1 (CET)
  - Summer (DST): UTC+2 (CEST)
- Vehicle registration: BLM

Pieńki Borowe [ˈpjɛɲki bɔˈrɔvɛ] is a village in the administrative district of Gmina Jedwabne, within Łomża County, Podlaskie Voivodeship, in north-eastern Poland.

== History ==
Pieńki Borowe was a private village of Polish nobility, administratively located in the Masovian Voivodeship in the Greater Poland Province of the Polish Crown.

After the joint German-Soviet invasion of Poland, which started World War II, the village was occupied by the Soviet Union from 1939 to 1941, and then by Nazi Germany from 1941 to 1944. In 1942, the Germans massacred 60 Poles from the local nursing home in nearby Jeziorko (see Nazi crimes against the Polish nation). Some of the victims have not been identified, because in 1944 the Germans burned the victims' bodies in attempt to cover up the crime.
