= Massacre in Trhová Kamenice =

Nazi massacre of Czech civilians

Coordinates: 49°47′19″N 15°49′1″E

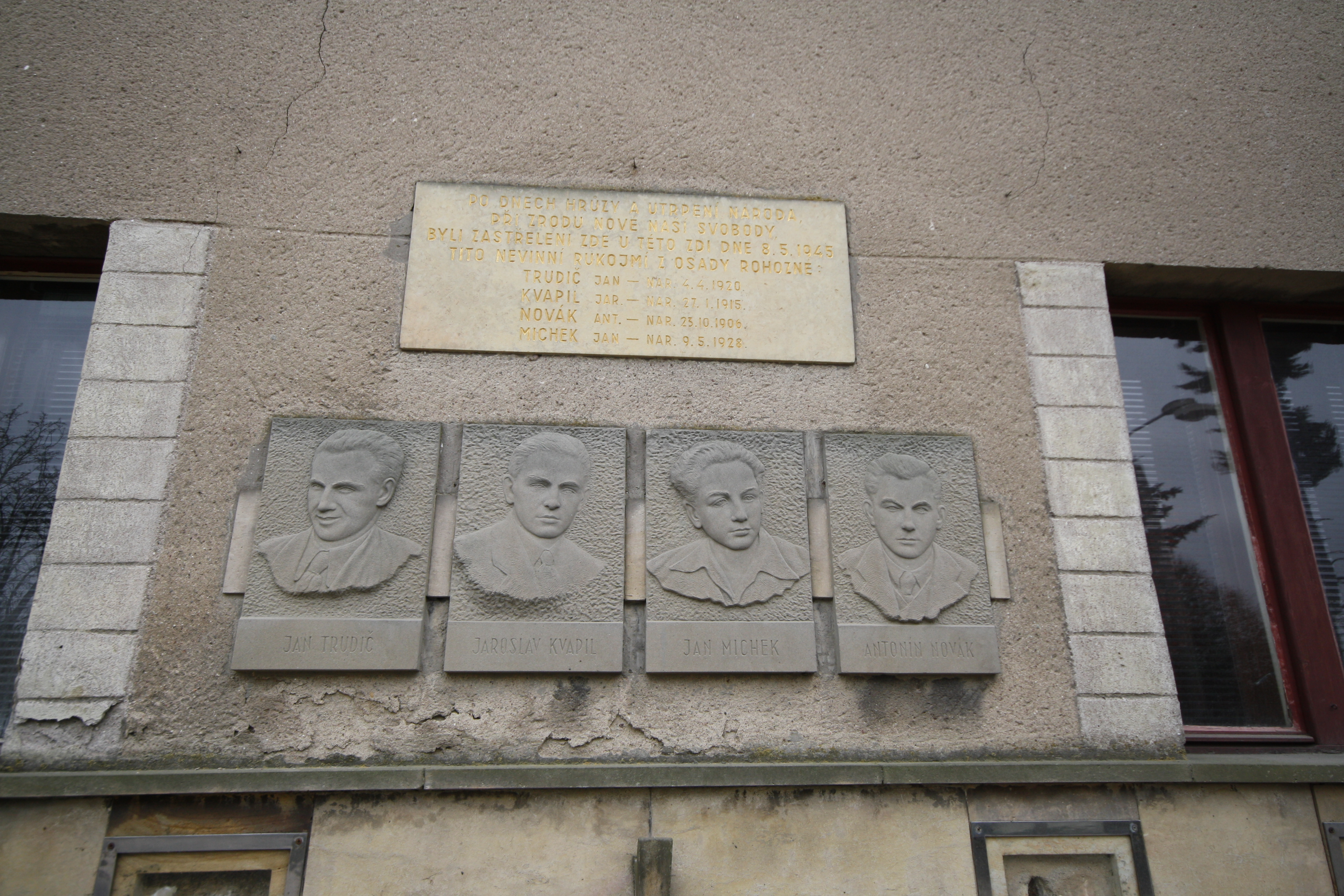
Memorial of World War II victims from Trhová Kamenice, Chrudim District

The Massacre in Trhová Kamenice occurred on 8 May 1945 in what is now the Czech Republic.

Prior to the massacre, in the midst of the Prague uprising, a similar uprising broke out in the town of Trhová Kamenice on 5 May; 30 German soldiers residing there were disarmed and interned in a local school building after the surrender of their commander. The partisans, less than 30 in number and armed with light weapons, hid on both sides of the road behind the village of Rohozná, about two kilometres (1.2 miles) north of Trhová Kamenice, and prepared barricades.

The first confrontation occurred on the afternoon of 5 May; a convoy of German vehicles going towards Chrudim from Ždírec (now Ždírec nad Doubravou) exchanged fire with the partisans, killing four Germans, two members of the Russian Liberation Army (ROA), and a partisan of squad Lev ('Lion'), Josef Kumpán of Dřevíkov. As the partisans were very badly outnumbered, they were routed by the Germans.

On 8 May, 140 German military vehicles arrived near the village; the partisans assumed that they were sent there in retaliation for the previous action against the soldiers. The Germans fired indiscriminately at the partisans to intimidate them, and the partisans decided to retreat and negotiate with the Germans via a local photographer, Viktor Mráz, who was fluent in German.

While the Germans were travelling through the village, they noticed the German and ROA soldiers interned in the school, and someone allegedly fired at the German column. The column stopped and freed the internees, and then attacked the town church, murdering the priests. The Germans began to fire into windows and the church tower, and killed Marie Pilařová, who was returning from a visit to her relatives. They went door-to-door and seized anyone who had mud on their shoes. They gathered four hostages captured near Rohozná – Jaroslav Kvapil, Jan Michek, Janko Trudič, and Antonín Novák – and gathered them in front of house number 6, where they were shot dead. Under the nearby hill, known as Třešňovka, the troops shot three more people – Antonín Alinč, Adolf Zábský and Emanuel Kacafírek – who were trying to escape into the woods.

There is now a monument in the village to remember the event. Those responsible were never brought to trial.
