= Cavriglia =

- Comune
- Comune di Cavriglia
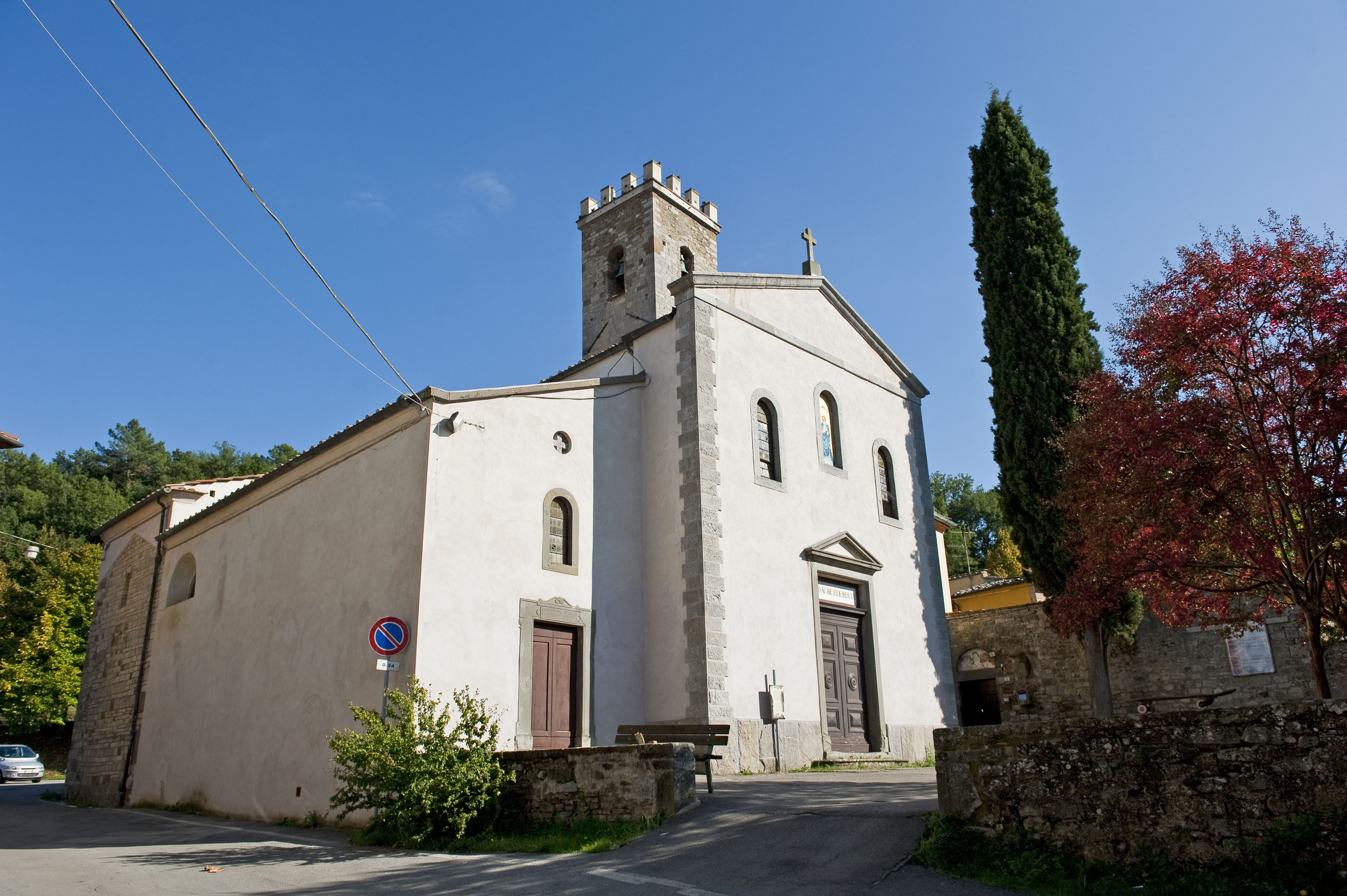
- Church of Santa Maria in Cavriglia

- Coat of arms

- Location within Italy Location within Tuscany
- Coordinates: 43°31′N 11°29′E
- Country: Italy
- Region: Tuscany
- Province: Arezzo (AR)
- Frazioni: Castelnuovo dei Sabbioni, Massa dei Sabbioni, Meleto Valdarno, Montegonzi, Neri, Santa Barbara, San Cipriano, Vacchereccia

Government
  - Mayor: Ivano Ferri

Area
  - Total: 60.86 km^{2} (23.50 sq mi)
- Elevation: 308 m (1,010 ft)

Population (31 December 2013)
  - Total: 9,633
  - Density: 158.3/km^{2} (409.9/sq mi)
- Demonym: Cavrigliesi
- Time zone: UTC+1 (CET)
  - Summer (DST): UTC+2 (CEST)
- Postal code: 52022
- Dialing code: 0575
- Website: Official website

Cavriglia is a comune (municipality) in the province of Arezzo in the Italian region Tuscany, located about 35 kilometres (22 mi) southeast of Florence and about 35 kilometres (22 mi) west of Arezzo.

Cavriglia borders the following municipalities: Figline Valdarno, Gaiole in Chianti, Greve in Chianti, Montevarchi, Radda in Chianti, San Giovanni Valdarno.

== Sister cities ==
Cavriglia is twinned with the following town:

- La Chapelle-Saint-Mesmin, France
- Mellieħa, Malta (since 2007)
- Mohyliv-Podilskyi, Ukraine
