= Jeziorko, Podlaskie Voivodeship =

Jeziorko
- Village
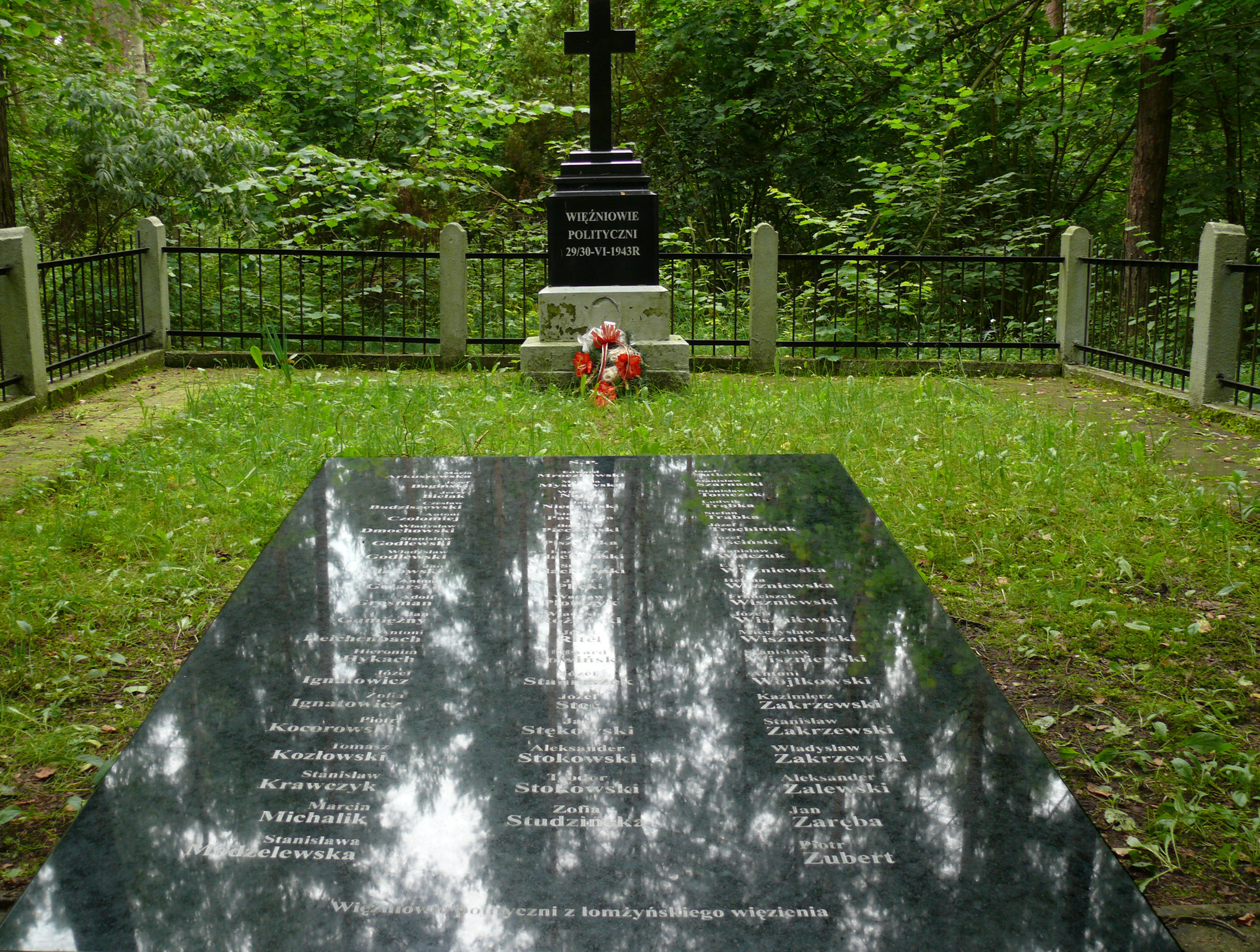
- Mass grave of Poles murdered by the Germans in June 1943

- Location within Poland
- Coordinates: 53°13′N 22°10′E
- Country: Poland
- Voivodeship: Podlaskie
- County: Łomża
- Gmina: Piątnica
- Established: 15th century
- Time zone: UTC+1 (CET)
  - Summer (DST): UTC+2 (CEST)
- Vehicle registration: BLM

Jeziorko [jɛˈʑɔrkɔ] is a village in the administrative district of Gmina Piątnica, within Łomża County, Podlaskie Voivodeship, in north-eastern Poland.

== History ==
Jeziorko was founded in the early 15th century, and was mentioned in a document from 1426. It was a private village of Polish nobility, administratively located in the Masovian Voivodeship in the Greater Poland Province of the Kingdom of Poland.

In the Third Partition of Poland (1795), it was annexed by Prussia. In 1807 it was regained by Poles and included within the newly established but short-lived Duchy of Warsaw, and in 1815 it passed to the Russian Partition of Poland. 19th-century owners from the Rzętkowski family took part in the Polish November and January Uprisings against Russia. The village suffered during both World War I, after which in 1918 Poland regained independence, and the Polish–Soviet War, during which it was a site of a battle. In interwar Poland a landscape park was founded around the local manor house of the Schirmer family.

After the joint German-Soviet invasion of Poland, which started World War II, the village was occupied by the Soviet Union from 1939 to 1941, and then by Nazi Germany from 1941 to 1944. Owner of the Jeziorko manor, Wacław Schirmer, was arrested and deported to forced labour by the Soviets in 1939, and probably later murdered in 1941, while his family managed to escape and hide in Warsaw in the German-occupied part of Poland. The manor was devastated. The Germans carried out three massacres of Poles in the Jeziorko forest (see Nazi crimes against the Polish nation). In 1942, they murdered 60 residents of a nursing home from Pieńki Borowe, in June 1943 they murdered 62 people who had previously been imprisoned in Łomża, and in July 1943 they murdered 52 members of Łomża's intelligentsia. Some of the victims have not been identified, because in 1944 the Germans burned the victims' bodies in attempt to cover up the crime. Despite such circumstances, the Polish resistance movement was active in Jeziorko, and even organized secret Polish education, established a secret printing house and issued underground Polish press. The Germans deported several Poles to Nazi concentration camps. In 1944 the village was restored to Poland, although with a Soviet-installed communist regime, which retained power until the 1989 Fall of Communism.

Stanisław Marchewka (1908–1957), notable member of the local Polish resistance movement in World War II, was born and lived in the village. He was killed in Jeziorko as one of the last partisans of the anti-communist resistance in Poland. A memorial to him was unveiled in Jeziorko 2007. In 2009, President of Poland Lech Kaczyński, posthumously awarded him with the Grand Cross of the Order of Polonia Restituta, one of Poland's highest state decorations.
