= Castelnuovo dei Sabbioni =

- Frazione
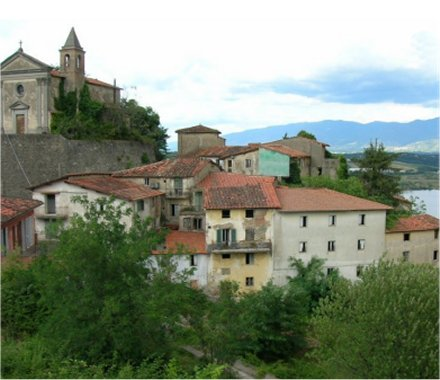
- The old town of Castelnuovo dei Sabbioni

- Location of Castelnuovo dei Sabbioni in Italy
- Coordinates: 43°32′27″N 11°27′8″E
- Country: Italy
- Region: Tuscany
- Province: Arezzo
- Comune: Cavriglia
- Elevation: 280 m (920 ft)

Population (2011)
  - Total: 1,242
- Time zone: UTC+1 (CET)
  - Summer (DST): UTC+2 (CEST)
- Postal code: 52020
- Dialing code: 055

Castelnuovo dei Sabbioni is a village (frazione) in the comune of Cavriglia in the province of Arezzo in Tuscany, Italy. As of 2011, it had a population of 1,242.

Starting from the mid-sixties, the town was gradually abandoned by the inhabitants due to excavation activity in favor of the nearby Camonti, a newly established hamlet.

The church in the village is devoted to Saint Donatus of Arezzo.

== History ==
Castelnuovo was one of the places in which the Cavriglia massacre took place. This massacre was carried out by units of the 1st Fallschirm-Panzer Division Hermann Göring on July 4, 1944, killing 173 people.

== Mining activity ==
Castelnuovo is located in an important mining basin for the extraction of lignite, which is currently exhausted.

Near this was the so-called "Dispensa", a group of blocks created at the time of the First World War as a dormitory for workers who came to work from afar. From the early twenties, those dormitories were transformed into apartments for the families of those who worked at the Valdarno Mining Company and therefore it became a real nucleus full of families.

Until the beginning of the sixties, the complex was still inhabited. Subsequently, it was gradually abandoned due to the dangers caused by excavation. In the mid-1960s it was partially destroyed. The evacuation of the inhabitants was completed in the mid-1980s.
