= Operation Eisbär =

1942 massacre

- Part of Eastern Front (World War II), World War II
- Location: Kursk Oblast, Russian Federation
- Date: October 1942
- Target: Soviet partisans, civilians
- Attack type: Massacre and Mass murder of civilians
- Victims: 44 civilians were shot, 150 civilians killed
- Perpetrators: Nazi Germany; • 2nd Panzer Army; Commanders: Adolf Heusinger; General von Stumpfeld; Sonderführer Paul Laue; Schiefer; Sprengel
- Motive: extermination of civilians who supported the guerrillas in populated areas

Operation "Polar Bear", German: Operation Eisbär (October 1942) - a punitive police and military anti-guerrilla operation of the German occupation troops in the Kursk Oblast of the Russian Federation, aimed at the destruction of civilians who supported the guerrillas in settlements adjacent to forest areas.

The plan for the operation was drawn up by Hitler's special commissioner, General Adolf Heusinger. The operation was conducted under the command of the command of the 2nd Panzer Army with the involvement of frontline army units.

== Some facts ==
In the settlement of Bolshoy Dub in Mikhailovsky (now Zheleznogorsky) Raion, Kursk Oblast, on the morning of 17 October 1942, 44 civilians were shot, including 26 children (five of them were under a year old). In the neighbouring villages of Zvezda and Kholstinka about 150 inhabitants were also killed.

The punitive expedition was sent to the Mikhailovsky Raion on the orders of the commandant of the city of Kursk, General von Stumpfeld. The detailed plan of the operation "White Bear" on the territory of Mikhailovsky Raion was drawn up on 14 October 1942 at a secret meeting in Mikhaylovka sloboda, where the chief of the Gestapo Sonderführer Paul Laue, the chiefs of the gendarmerie of Dmitriyev Schiefer and Mikhailovka sloboda Sprengel were present. The latter led the massacre in the village of Bolshoy Dub.

== See also ==
- Fascist state terror
- Bandenbekämpfung
