= Cross =

Geometrical figure

A Greek cross (all arms of equal length) above a saltire, a cross whose limbs are slanted

The cross is a geometrical figure consisting of two intersecting lines or bars, usually perpendicular to each other. The lines usually run vertically and horizontally. A cross of oblique lines, in the shape of the Latin letter X, is also termed a saltire in heraldic terminology. Throughout centuries the cross in its various shapes and forms was a symbol of various beliefs.

The cross has been widely taken as an official symbol of the Christian faith exclusively from an early period in that religion's history to present. In pre-Christian times, it was used as a religious or cultural symbol throughout Europe, in west and south Asia (the latter, in the form of the original swastika); and in Ancient Egypt, where the Ankh was a hieroglyph that represented "life" and was used in the worship of the god Aten. It often appeared in conjunction with the female-genital circle or oval to signify the sacred marriage, as in the Egyptian amulet Nefer, which features the male cross and female orb, considered an amulet of blessedness and a charm of sexual harmony.

== Name ==
The word cross is recorded in 11th-century Old English as cros, exclusively for the instrument of Christ's crucifixion, replacing the native Old English word rood. The word's history is complicated; it appears to have entered English from Old Irish, possibly via Old Norse, ultimately from the Latin crux (or its accusative crucem and its genitive crucis), "stake, cross". The English verb to cross arises from the noun c. 1200, first in the sense "to make the sign of the cross"; the generic meaning "to intersect" develops in the 15th century. The Latin word was influenced by popular etymology by a native Germanic word reconstructed as *krukjo (English crook, Old English crycce, Old Norse krokr, Old High German krucka). This word, by conflation with Latin crux, gave rise to Old French crocier (modern French crosse), the term for a shepherd's crook, adopted in English as crosier.

Latin crux referred to the gibbet where criminals were executed, a stake or pole, with or without transom, on which the condemned were impaled or hanged, but more particularly a cross or the pole of a carriage. The derived verb cruciāre means "to put to death on the cross" or, more frequently, "to put to the rack, to torture, torment", especially in reference to mental troubles. In the Roman world, furca replaced crux as the name of some cross-like instruments for lethal and temporary punishment, ranging from a forked cross to a gibbet or gallows.

The field of etymology is of no help in any effort to trace a supposed original meaning of crux. A crux can be of various shapes: from a single beam used for impaling or suspending (crux simplex) to the various composite kinds of cross (crux compacta) made from more beams than one. The latter shapes include not only the traditional †-shaped cross (the crux immissa), but also the T-shaped cross (the crux commissa or tau cross), which the descriptions in antiquity of the execution cross indicate as the normal form in use at that time, and the X-shaped cross (the crux decussata or saltire).

The Greek equivalent of Latin crux "stake, gibbet" is stauros, found in texts of four centuries or more before the gospels and always in the plural number to indicate a stake or pole. From the first century BC, it is used to indicate an instrument used in executions. The Greek word is used in descriptions in antiquity of the execution cross, which indicate that its normal shape was similar to the Greek letter tau (Τ).

== History ==
=== Pre-Christian ===
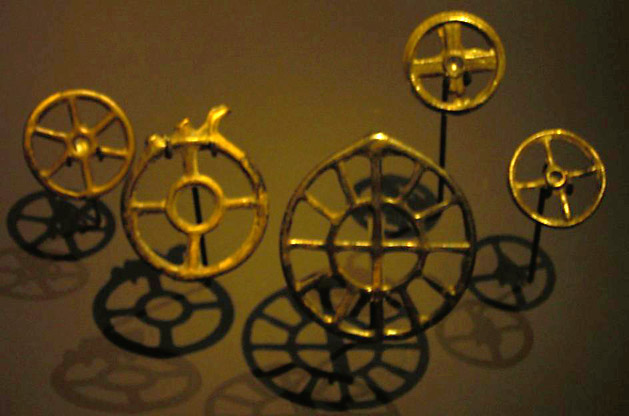
Bronze Age "wheel pendants" in the shape of the "sun cross" (Urnfield culture, 2nd millennium BC).

Due to the simplicity of the design (two intersecting lines), cross-shaped incisions make their appearance from deep prehistory; as petroglyphs in European cult caves, dating back to the beginning of the Upper Paleolithic, and throughout prehistory to the Iron Age. Also of prehistoric age are numerous variants of the simple cross mark, including the crux gammata with curving or angular lines, and the Egyptian crux ansata with a loop.

Speculation has associated the cross symbol – even in the prehistoric period – with astronomical or cosmological symbology involving "four elements" (Chevalier, 1997) or the cardinal points, or the unity of a vertical axis mundi or celestial pole with the horizontal world (Koch, 1955). Speculation of this kind became especially popular in the mid- to late-19th century in the context of comparative mythology seeking to tie Christian mythology to ancient cosmological myths. Influential works in this vein included G. de Mortillet (1866), L. Müller (1865), W. W. Blake (1888), Ansault (1891), etc.

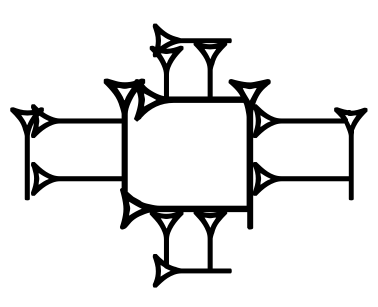
Archaic cuneiform character LAK-617 (𒔁): a cruciform arrangement of five boxes; scribes could use the central, larger box as container for other characters.

The cross sign occurs trivially in tally marks, and develops into a number symbol independently in the Roman numerals (X "ten"), the Chinese rod numerals (十 "ten") and the Brahmi numerals ("four", whence the numeral 4).

In the Phoenician alphabet and derived scripts, the cross symbol represented the phoneme /t/, i.e. the letter taw, which is the historical predecessor of Latin T. The letter name taw means "mark", presumably continuing the Egyptian hieroglyph "two crossed sticks" (Gardiner Z9).

=== Post-Christian ===
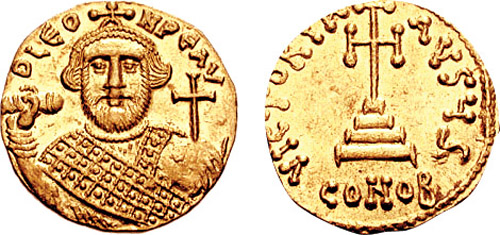
Early use of a globus cruciger on a solidus minted by Leontios (r. 695–698); on the obverse, a stepped cross in the shape of an Iota Eta monogram.

The shape of the cross (crux, stauros "stake, gibbet"), as represented by the Latin letter T, came to be used as a new symbol (seal) or emblem of Christianity since the 2nd century AD to succeeding Ichthys in aftermaths of that new religion's separation from Judaism. Clement of Alexandria in the early 3rd century calls it τὸ κυριακὸν σημεῖον ("the Lord's sign") he repeats the idea, current as early as the Epistle of Barnabas, that the number 318 (in Greek numerals, ΤΙΗ) in Genesis 14:14 was a foreshadowing (a "type") of the cross (the letter Tau) and of Jesus (the letters Iota Eta). Clement's contemporary Tertullian rejects the accusation that Christians are crucis religiosi (i.e. "adorers of the gibbet"), and returns the accusation by likening the worship of pagan idols to the worship of poles or stakes. In his book De Corona, written in 204, Tertullian tells how it was already a tradition for Christians to trace repeatedly on their foreheads the sign of the cross.

While early Christians used the T-shape to represent the cross in writing and gesture, the use of the Greek cross and Latin cross, i.e. crosses with intersecting beams, appears in Christian art towards the end of Late Antiquity. An early example of the cruciform halo, used to identify Christ in paintings, is found in the Miracles of the Loaves and Fishes mosaic of Sant'Apollinare Nuovo, Ravenna (6th century). The Patriarchal cross, a Latin cross with an additional horizontal bar, first appears in the 10th century. A wide variation of cross symbols is introduced for the purposes of heraldry beginning in the age of the Crusades.

== Marks and graphemes ==
The cross mark is used to mark a position, or as a check mark, but also to mark deletion. Derived from Greek Chi are the Latin letter X, Cyrillic Kha and possibly runic Gyfu.

Egyptian hieroglyphs involving cross shapes include ankh "life", ndj "protect" and nfr "good; pleasant, beautiful".

Sumerian cuneiform had a simple cross-shaped character, consisting of a horizontal and a vertical wedge (𒈦), read as maš "tax, yield, interest"; the superposition of two diagonal wedges results in a decussate cross (𒉽), read as pap "first, pre-eminent" (the superposition of these two types of crosses results in the eight-pointed star used as the sign for "sky" or "deity" (𒀭), DINGIR). The cuneiform script has other, more complex, cruciform characters, consisting of an arrangement of boxes or the fourfold arrangement of other characters, including the archaic cuneiform characters LAK-210, LAK-276, LAK-278, LAK-617 and the classical sign EZEN (𒂡).

Phoenician tāw is still cross-shaped in Paleo-Hebrew alphabet and in some Old Italic scripts (Raetic and Lepontic), and its descendant T becomes again cross-shaped in the Latin minuscule t. The plus sign (+) is derived from Latin t via a simplification of a ligature for et "and" (introduced by Johannes Widmann in the late 15th century).

The letter Aleph is cross-shaped in Aramaic and paleo-Hebrew.

Egyptian hieroglyphs with cross-shapes include Gardiner Z9 – Z11 ("crossed sticks", "crossed planks").

Other, unrelated cross-shaped letters include Brahmi ka (predecessor of the Devanagari letter क) and Old Turkic (Orkhon) d² and Old Hungarian b, and Katakana ナ na and メ me.

The multiplication sign (×), often attributed to William Oughtred (who first used it in an appendix to the 1618 edition of John Napier's Descriptio) apparently had been in occasional use since the mid 16th century.

Other typographical symbols resembling crosses include the dagger or obelus (†), the Chinese (十, Kangxi radical 24) and Roman (X ten).

Unicode has a variety of cross symbols in the "Dingbat" block (U+2700–U+27BF):

✕ ✖ ✗ ✘ ✙ ✚ ✛ ✜ ✝ ✞ ✟ ✠ ✢ ✣ ✤ ✥

The Miscellaneous Symbols block (U+2626 to U+262F) adds three specific Christian cross variants, viz. the Patriarchal cross (☦), Cross of Lorraine (☨) and Cross potent (☩, mistakenly labeled a "Cross of Jerusalem").

== Emblems ==
The following is a list of cross symbols, except for variants of the Christian cross and Heraldic crosses, for which see the dedicated lists at Christian cross variants and Crosses in heraldry, respectively.

Crosses as emblems and symbols
| Picture | Cross name | Description |
|---|---|---|
| | Ankh | The ankh or crux ansata, an Egyptian hieroglyph representing "life". |
| | Basque cross | The Basque cross or lauburu. |
| | the Sun cross | The "sun cross" or "wheel cross" appears with some regularity in prehistoric European artefacts, usually interpreted as a solar symbol, perhaps representing the spoked wheel of the Sun chariot. |
| | Swastika | The swastika or crux gammata (in heraldry fylfot), historically used as a symbol in Buddhism, Jainism and Hinduism, and widely popular in the early 20th century as a symbol of good luck or prosperity before adopted as a symbol of Nazism in the 1920s and 30s. |

As a design element

| Picture | Cross name | Description |
|---|---|---|
| | Crossed keys | Symbol of the Papacy used in various emblems representing the keys to heaven. |
| | Crossed swords | The crossed swords symbol (⚔ at Unicode U+2694) is used to represent battlegrounds on maps. It is also used to show that person died in battle or that a war machine was lost in action. Two crossed swords also look like a Christian cross and the mixed symbolism has been used in military decorations. It is also a popular way to display swords on a wall often with a shield in the center |
| | Four-leaf clover | Used as a symbol for luck as well as a stand in for a cross in various works. |
| | Skull and crossbones | Traditionally used to mark Spanish cemeteries; the symbol evolved to represent death/danger, poison, and pirates. |

== Physical gestures ==
Cross shapes are made by a variety of physical gestures. Crossing the fingers of one hand is a common invocation of the symbol. The sign of the cross associated with Christian genuflection is made with one hand: in Eastern Orthodox tradition the sequence is head-heart-right shoulder-left shoulder, while in Oriental Orthodox, Catholic and Anglican tradition the sequence is head-heart-left-right.

Crossing the index fingers of both hands represents and a charm against evil in European folklore. Other gestures involving more than one hand include the "cross my heart" movement associated with making a promise and the Tau shape of the referee's "time out" hand signal.

Crossed index fingers represent the number 10 (十) in Chinese number gestures.

== Unicode ==
Unicode provides various cross symbols:

| Symbol | Name | Code point |
|---|---|---|
| ✚ | Heavy Greek Cross | U+271A |
| ✠ | Maltese Cross | U+2720 |
| ♱ | East Syriac Cross | U+2671 |
| ♰ | West Syriac Cross | U+2670 |
| ☨ | Cross of Lorraine | U+2628 |
| ☩ | Cross of Jerusalem | U+2629 |
| ✟ | Latin Cross outline | U+271F |
| ✞ | Shadowed White Latin Cross | U+271E |
| ✝ | Latin Roman Cross | U+271D |
| † | Dagger | U+2020 |
| ✛ | Open Centre Cross | U+271B |
| ✙ | Outlined Greek Cross | U+2719 |
| ✘ | Heavy Ballot X | U+2718 |
| ✜ | Heavy Open Centre Cross | U+271C |
| ✖ | Heavy Multiplication X | U+2716 |
| ❌ | Cross Mark | U+274C |
| ✗ | Ballot X | U+2717 |
| ✢ | Four Teardrop-Spoked Asterisk | U+2722 |
| ✤ | Heavy Four Balloon-Spoked Asterisk | U+2724 |
