= Exousia =

Biblical term translated as "authority"

Exousia (Greek: ἐξουσία) is an Ancient Greek word used in the New Testament, the exact meaning of which is debated by scholars but is generally translated as "authority". Paul the Apostle wrote that a woman should have exousia "on [or perhaps 'over'] her head", but the meaning of the passage is not clear.

== Etymology ==
According to William Edwin Vine's Vine's Expository Dictionary, exousia means "authority". The word derives from the verb exesti for "it is lawful". It is used over 100 times in the New Testament in different contexts.

Used in different contexts in the Paul's Letter to the Romans and First Corinthians, it can mean the power or authority to occupy a position of superiority. In the Epistle to Philemon parrhesia is used in a similar context instead of exousia.

== In the Bible ==
The word is used for the authority of Jesus to forgive sins (Matthew 9:6), and Paul invokes it in 2 Corinthians for his own apostolic authority: "For though I should boast - somewhat more of our authority, which the Lord hath given us for edification, and not for your destruction." In other contexts it is used when Jesus claimed that "all power is given unto me in heaven and in earth" (Matthew 28:18), or similarly "power over all flesh" (John 17:2), and in The Book of Revelation in reference to the ten kings represented by the horns of the Beast that they "shall give their power and strength unto the beast".

Saint John, in his gospel, uses the term also in the context of Pilate's judicial power "I have the power to crucify thee, and have power to release thee", and also in Jesus' response "Thou couldest have no power at all against me, except it were given thee from above: therefore he that delivered me unto thee hath the greater sin" (John 19:10–11). It is similarly used in Luke: "And when they bring you unto the synagogues, and unto magistrates, and powers, take ye no thought how or what ye shall say: For the Holy Ghost shall teach you in the same hour what ye ought to say".

=== Book of Revelation ===
The transfer of exousia from the two witnesses to the two beasts is a major theme in Revelation 11–13. At first the authority of the witnesses to perform signs and wonders, and call down judgments, is absolute. The Beast and false prophet receive the authority to kill the two witnesses during the Tribulation and to draw the powers of the world to themselves.

== In angelology ==
In Christian angelology, the exusiai or exousiai are the "Authorities", the angels who supervise the movements of the heavenly bodies.
