= Instrument of Jesus's crucifixion =

Shape of the structure on which Jesus was crucified

The instrument of Jesus's crucifixion (known in Latin as crux, in Greek as stauros) is generally taken to have been composed of an upright wooden beam to which was added a transom, thus forming a "cruciform" or T-shaped structure.

Most Christian denominations present the Christian cross in this form, and the tradition of the T-shape can be traced to early Christianity and the Church Fathers. Nonetheless, some late-19th century scholars maintained that it was a simple stake (crux simplex). In 2011 Gunnar Samuelsson concluded that there is not enough evidence in pre-Christian ancient texts or in the New Testament writings themselves to resolve the ambiguity of the terms referring to the instrument on which Jesus was executed. On the other hand, David W. Chapman argues that to take one single Greek word and conclude that it has one universal and unchanging meaning like the word stauros "is a common word study fallacy in some populist literature. In fact, such terminology often referred in antiquity to cross-shaped crucifixion devices. For example, Lucian, in a brief dialogue that employs most Greek crucifixion vocabulary, refers to the "crucifixion" of Prometheus, whose arms are pinned while stretched from one rock to another. Such a cross-shaped crucifixion position in the Roman era may actually have been the norm."

== Presence or absence of crossbar ==
=== Ambiguity of terms used ===
The Koine Greek terms used in the New Testament of the structure on which Jesus died are stauros (σταυρός) and xylon (ξύλον). These words, which can refer to many different things, do not indicate the precise shape of the structure; scholars have long known that the Greek word stauros and the Latin word crux did not uniquely mean a cross, but could also be used to refer to one, and so do not considered necessarily incorrect the traditional picture of a cross with transom.

The ambiguity of the terms was noted by Justus Lipsius in his De Cruce (1594), Jacob Gretser in his De Cruce Christi (1598) and Thomas Godwyn in his Moses and Aaron (1662).

John Pearson, Bishop of Chester (c. 1660) wrote in his commentary on the Apostles' Creed that the Greek word stauros originally signified "a straight standing Stake, Pale, or Palisador", but that, "when other transverse or prominent parts were added in a perfect Cross, it retained still the Original Name", and he declared: "The Form then of the Cross on which our Saviour suffered was not a simple, but a compounded, Figure, according to the Custom of the Romans, by whose Procurator he was condemned to die. In which there was not only a straight and erected piece of Wood fixed in the Earth, but also a transverse Beam fastened unto that towards the top thereof".

Justus Lipsius invented a specific terminology to distinguish different forms of what could be called a cross or crux. His basic twofold distinction was between the crux simplex (a simple stake) and the crux compacta (a composite of two pieces of wood). The victim could be affixed to the crux simplex or could be impaled on it. Lipsius then subdivided the crux compacta into three types: the crux decussata (X-shaped), crux commissa (T-shaped) and crux immissa (resembling a traditional Christian cross).

Lipsius himself, as also Gretser and Godwyn, held that Jesus was nailed not to a crux simplex, but to a crux immissa. However, W. E. Vine and E. W. Bullinger, as well as Henry Dana Ward, considered that the "cross" (Greek stauros, in its original sense literally an upright pale or stake) had no crossbar, and that the traditional picture of Jesus on a cross with a crossbar was incorrect.

=== Stauros interpreted as simple stake only ===
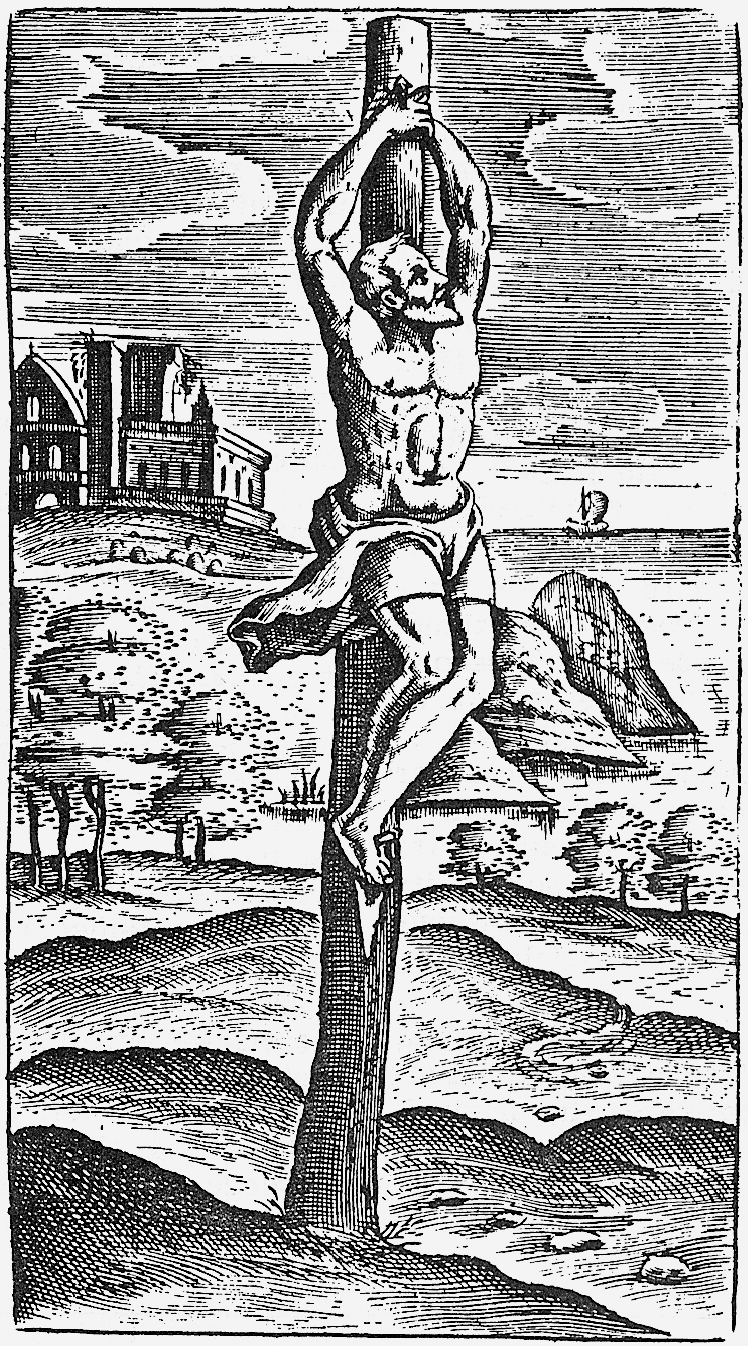
Crucifixion on a crux simplex ad affixionem: drawing in a 1629 reprint of De cruce of Justus Lipsius (1547–1606)

In his 1871 study of the history of the cross, Episcopal preacher Henry Dana Ward accepted as the only form of the gibbet on which Jesus died "a pale, a strong stake, a wooden post".

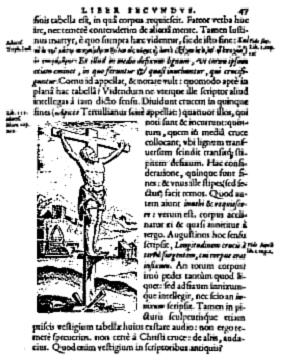
Crucifixion of Jesus, by Justus Lipsius: De cruce (1595), p. 47

Anglican theologian E. W. Bullinger, in The Companion Bible (which was completed and published in 1922, nine years after his 1913 death), was emphatic in his belief that stauros never meant two pieces of timber placed across one another at any angle, "but always of one piece alone [...] There is nothing [of the word stauros] in the Greek of the N.T. even to imply two pieces of timber." Bullinger wrote that in the catacombs of Rome Christ was never represented there as "hanging on a cross" and that the cross was a pagan symbol of life (the ankh) in Egyptian churches that was borrowed by the Christians. He cited a letter from English Dean John William Burgon, who questioned whether a cross occurred on any Christian monument of the first four centuries and wrote: "The 'invention' of it in pre-Christian times, and the 'invention' of its use in later times, are truths of which we need to be reminded in the present day. The evidence is thus complete, that the Lord was put to death upon an upright stake, and not on two pieces of timber placed in any manner."

With regard to the "primary" or "original" meaning of the Greek word σταυρός, William Edwy Vine (1873–1949) wrote in his Expository Dictionary of New Testament Words, published in 1940: "stauros denotes, primarily, 'an upright pale or stake'. On such malefactors were nailed for execution. Both the noun and the verb stauroo, 'to fasten to a stake or pale', are originally to be distinguished from the ecclesiastical form of a two beamed cross". He said the shape of the ecclesiastical form of a two-beamed cross "had its origin in ancient Chaldea, and was used as the symbol of the god Tammuz (being the shape of the mystic Tau, the initial of his name) in Chaldea and nearby lands, including Egypt". He added that third-century churches, which by then had departed from certain doctrines of the Christian faith, accepted pagans into the faith in order to increase their prestige and allowed them to retain their pagan signs and symbols. "Hence the Tau or T, in its most frequent form, with the cross-piece lowered, was adopted to stand for the 'cross' of Christ." This association of the cross symbol with Tammuz had already been made by Abram Herbert Lewis in his 1892 book Paganism Surviving in Christianity.

=== Stauros interpreted as patibulum ===
Andreas J. Köstenberger (2004) notes that traditional academic reconstruction of the cross has first Jesus, then Simon of Cyrene bear the stauros, i.e. only the horizontal crossbar, Latin patibulum. Yet when Simon carries the patibulum to Golgotha, the crossbar is then hoisted to the stake to make the traditional crucifix shape. Schröter (1997) notes that the lack of references in ancient sources, aside from Plautus (The Charcoal Woman 2 and The Braggart Warrior 2.4.6–7) and Plutarch (Moralia 554AB), to "bearing the cross" implies that a criminal carrying his own patibulum was not very common.

James B. Torrance in the article "Cross" in the New Bible Dictionary writes that the Greek word for "cross" (stauros; verb stauroō; Latin crux, crucifigo, 'I fasten to a cross') means primarily an upright stake or beam, but also allows the construction that Jesus and Simon of Cyrene carried a patibulum to Golgotha.

In applying the word stauros to the crossbeam, these writers indicate that the complete structure on which Jesus died was not a single upright post but formed what is normally called a cross.

Raymond Edward Brown remarks that in the canonical gospels "not a word is reported about the form of the cross, about how he was affixed, about the amount of the pain", but excludes the use for Jesus of a crux simplex, "since he carried a cross[beam] to the place of execution".

=== Stauros interpreted as ambiguous in meaning ===
The Greek-English Lexicon of Liddell and Scott reports that the meaning of the word "σταυρός" in the early Homeric form of Greek, possibly of the eighth to sixth century BC, and also in the writings of the fifth-century BC writers Herodotus and Thucydides and the early-4th century BC Xenophon, is "an upright pale or stake" used to build a palisade or "a pile driven in to serve as a foundation" It reports that in the writings of the first-century BC Diodorus Siculus, first-century AD Plutarch and early second-century Lucian—as well as in Matthew 27:40, Luke 9:23, 14:27—the word "σταυρός" is used to refer to a cross, either as the instrument of crucifixion or metaphorically of voluntary suffering; "its form was indicated by the Greek letter Τ". It also reports that Plutarch used the word with regard to a pale for impaling a corpse. Of the writers whom Liddell and Scott gives as using "σταυρός" to mean a cross, the New International Dictionary of New Testament Theology holds that in Diodorus Siculus the word probably means a stake for hanging. Plutarch (in An vitiositas ad infelicitatem sufficiat) distinguishes crucifixion on a stauros from impalement on a skolops.

Joel B. Green, in The Cambridge Companion to Jesus, says the evidence of the manner of Jesus's death is far more ambiguous than is generally realised. Literary sensibilities in Roman antiquity did not promote graphic descriptions of the act of crucifixion, and even the Gospels report simply, "They crucified him", adding no further detail. According to Green, the Romans were slaves to no standard technique of crucifixion: "In describing the siege of Jerusalem by the Roman army, for example, Josephus reports that 'the soldiers out of rage and hatred amused themselves by nailing their prisoners in different positions' (J.W. 5.449–51). Elsewhere we learn that victims of crucifixion might be fixed to the stake in order to die, or impaled after death as a public display. They might be fixed to the cross with nails or with ropes. That Jesus was nailed to the cross is intimated in several texts (John 20.25; Acts 2.23; Col 2.14; Gos. Pet. 6.21; Justin Dial. 97). Nor can we turn to archaeological evidence for assistance."

Professor Robin M. Jensen, in her book entitled The Cross: History, Art, and Controversy, says that "stauros (Latin = crux) did not necessarily imply [a cross]. Historically both Greek and Latin words simply referred to an upright stake to which those condemned to death might be bound or tied until they suffocated to death. The conventional picture of a Latin cross (crux immissa) has been challenged over the centuries as some scholars and even Christian communities have argued instead that Christ died on a T-shaped cross (crux comissa) or even upon a simple stake (crux simplex)."

=== "Stauros" interpreted as a cross in the case of Jesus ===
In his book Crucifixion in Antiquity, Gunnar Samuelsson declares that, while the New Testament terminology is in itself not conclusive one way or another for the meaning of the word, "[t]here is a good possibility that σταυρός, when used by the evangelists, already had been charged with a distinct denotation − from Calvary. When, e.g., Mark used the noun it could have meant 'cross' in the sense in which the Church later perceived it. [...] The Gospel accounts probably show that σταυρός could signify "cross" in the mentioned sense, but they do not show that it always did so." In his Q and A page he adds: "(The Gospels) do not describe the event in length [...] The non-detailed accounts of the Gospels do not, however, contradict the traditional understanding. So the traditional understanding of the death of Jesus is correct, but we could acknowledge that it is more based on the eyewitness accounts than the actual passion narratives."

The New International Dictionary of New Testament Theology, dealing specifically with the crucifixion of Jesus, says it is most likely that the stauros had a transverse in the form of a crossbeam. "Secular sources do not permit any conclusion to be drawn as to the precise form of the cross, as to whether it was the crux immissa (†) or crux commissa (T). As it was not very common to affix a titlos (superscription, loanword from the Lat. titulus), it does not necessarily follow that the cross had the form of a crux immissa."

The authors say there were two possible ways of erecting the stauros, which would probably have been not much higher than the height of a man. The condemned man could be fastened to the cross lying on the ground at the place of execution, then lifted up on it. Alternatively, it was probably usual to have the stake implanted in the ground before the execution. The victim was tied to the crosspiece and was hoisted up with the horizontal beam and made fast to the vertical stake. They say that as this was the simpler form of erection, and the carrying of the crossbeam (patibulum) was probably a form of punishment for slaves, the crux commissa may be taken as the normal practice.

1. stauros is an upright stake. ...
2. stauros is an instrument of torture for serious offences, Plut. Ser. Num. Vind. 9 (II, 554a); Artemid. Onirocr., II, 53 (p. 152, 4 ff.); Diod. S. 2, 18 (-» III, 411. n.4). In shape we find three basic forms. The cross was a vertical, pointed stake (skolops, 409, 4 ff.), or it consisted of an upright with a cross-beam above it (T, crux commissa), or it consisted of two intersecting beams of equal (†, crux immissa)

Other reference works contend that the cross was "a post with a cross-beam" (Theological Dictionary of the New Testament); "the form usually seen in pictures, the crux immissa (Latin cross †), ... in which the upright beam projects above the shorter crosspiece" (International Standard Bible Encyclopedia); and "most likely the crux immissa (the traditional † depiction) or the crux commissa (a T-shaped cross)" (John R. Donahue and Daniel J. Harrington, The Gospel of Mark). Donahue and Harrington suggest: "The victim was first affixed to the crossbeam (patibulum) with ropes and/or nails through the wrists or forearms. Then the crossbeam was fitted on the vertical beam and the victim was lifted up and set on a peg or "seat" on the vertical beam and perhaps also on a footrest. The idea was to prolong the agony, not to make the victim more comfortable."

== Other technical details ==
=== Foundation in the ground ===
The question of the nature of the foundation for the cross used to crucify Jesus, is related to whether Jesus carried only the patibulum or the full cross (patibulum and stipes) to Golgotha – as to whether the upright stipes was a permanent fixture on Golgotha, or whether there was a permanent, or specially prepared reinforced hole for the base of the stipes. This also relates to the height of the cross, where estimates vary from 8 feet (2.4 m) to 15 feet (4.6 m) in height.

=== Method of fastening victim ===
Some theories suggest 3 nails were used to fasten victims while others suggest 4 nails. Throughout history, larger numbers of nails have been hypothesized, at times as high as 14 nails. The placing of the nails in the hands, or the wrists is also uncertain. Another theory suggests that the Greek word for hand also includes the forearm and that the nails were placed near the radius and ulna of the forearm. Ropes may have also been used to fasten the hands in addition to the use of nails.

=== Footrest ===
Another issue has been the use of a hypopodium as a standing platform to support the feet, given that the hands may not have been able to support the weight. In the 20th century, forensic pathologist Frederick Zugibe performed a number of crucifixion experiments by using ropes to hang human subjects at various angles and hand positions.

== Terminology ==
=== Greek xylon ("timber, tree") ===
In the Hebrew Bible Deuteronomy 21:23 states that "cursed of God is everyone who hangs on a tree". In the Septuagint this became ἐπὶ ξύλου (epi xylou). The word ξύλον (xylon) can mean anything made of wood, even something as complex as the Trojan horse, and applies also to a tree, even a living one, such as that described in the Book of Revelation 22:2 as the tree of life bearing fruit every month and whose leaves serve for healing. This word is used in the New Testament to refer to that on which Jesus died: Peter's 3 uses of xylon in First Peter chapter two (in English Bibles "tree") compared to Paul who only uses xylon "piece of wood" once.

In Greek texts the word xylon could be used for any object made of wood, including in varying contexts, gallows, stocks, pales and stakes. Therefore, the traditional Christian cross with a horizontal crossbeam would also be called xylon. In Liddell and Scott, the meanings of the word "ξύλον" are classified under five headings:

- wood cut and ready for use, firewood, timber (in these senses the word is usually in the plural);
- piece of wood, log, beam, post or an object made of wood, such as a spoon, the Trojan horse, a cudgel or club, an instrument of punishment (a collar for someone's neck, stocks to confine his feet or to confine his neck, arms and legs, a gallows to hang him, or a stake to impale him), a table, a bench as in the theatre;
- a tree;
- a blockhead or a stubborn person;
- a measure of length.

=== English ===
In English also, the words "tree" and "timber" are applied to Christ's cross envisaged as with transom: a hymn sung at the Good Friday veneration of the cross has the refrain: "Faithful Cross the Saints rely on, Noble tree beyond compare! [...] Sweet the timber, sweet the iron, Sweet the burden that they bear!"

=== Terminology used by ancient writers ===
Apart from meaning a stake, the word stauros was also used by writers of the early Christian period to refer to a construction with transom.

Using the Greek word σταυρός in its verbal form, the Jewish historian Josephus too, writing of the siege of Jerusalem in AD 70, recounted that the Jews caught outside the city walls "were first whipped, and then tormented with all sorts of tortures, before they died, and were then crucified before the wall of the city ... the soldiers, out of the wrath and hatred they bore the Jews, nailed those they caught, one after one way, and another after another, to the crosses, by way of jest."

Dionysius of Halicarnassus, who lived at the time of the birth of Jesus, described how those condemned to crucifixion were led to the place of execution:

"A Roman citizen of no obscure station, having ordered one of his slaves to be put to death, delivered him to his fellow-slaves to be led away, and in order that his punishment might be witnessed by all, directed them to drag him through the Forum and every other conspicuous part of the city as they whipped him, and that he should go ahead of the procession which the Romans were at that time conducting in honour of the god. The men ordered to lead the slave to his punishment, having stretched out both his arms and fastened them to a piece of wood which extended across his breast and shoulders as far as his wrists, followed him, tearing his naked body with whips." Roman Antiquities, VII, 69:1-2

Dionysius here uses the Greek word xylon (ξύλον) for the horizontal crossbeam (the "patibulum") used in Roman crucifixions; he describes how the hands of the condemned man were tied to it (χεῖρας ἀποτείναντες ἀμφοτέρας [...] προσδήσαντες) for him to be whipped while being led to the place of execution.

The mid-2nd-century diviner Artemidorus spoke of crucifixion as something that occurred on a cross that had breadth as well as height: "Since he is a criminal, he will be crucified in his height and in the extension of his hands" (Oneirocritica 1:76).

Lucian of Samosata (121–180) describes the crucifixion of the mythical Prometheus by nailing him to a precipice on the Caucasus "with his hands outstretched (ἐκπετασθεὶς τὼ χεῖρε) from crag to crag."

== Christian depictions ==
=== Early Christian descriptions ===
Although there is discussion about the meaning or meanings that the words σταυρός and crux had at that time, and about the shape or shapes that such gibbets had, Christians of the first centuries are unanimous in describing the particular structure built by the Romans on which Jesus died as having a transom, not as a simple upright.

The pseudepigraphic Epistle of Barnabas, which scholars suggest may have been before the end of the 1st century, and certainly earlier than 135, whether the writer was an orthodox Christian or not, described the shape people at the time attributed to the device on which Jesus died: the comparisons it draws with Old Testament figures would have had no validity for its readers if they pictured Jesus as dying on a simple stake. Referring to what he saw as Old Testament intimations of Jesus and his cross, he likened the cross to the letter Τ (the Greek letter tau, which had the numeric value of 300), thus describing it as having a crossbeam. He also wrote, with regard to Exodus 17:11–12: "The Spirit saith to the heart of Moses, that he should make a type of the cross and of Him that was to suffer, that unless, saith He, they shall set their hope on Him, war shall be waged against them for ever. Moses therefore pileth arms one upon another in the midst of the encounter, and standing on higher ground than any he stretched out his hands, and so Israel was again victorious."

Celsus (as quoted by Origen Contra Celsum, II:36) and Origen himself uses the verb "ἀνασκολοπίζω", which originally meant "to impale", of the crucifixion of Jesus. It was considered synonymous with "σταυρῶ", which also seems to have originally meant "to impale", and was applied also to the gibbet of Jesus's execution; but the shape of the gibbet is compared by Origen to that of the letter Τ. The final words of the Trials in the Court of Vowels,Δίκη Φωνηέντων, 12.4–13 found among the works of Lucian, also identify the shape of the σταυρός with that of the letter Τ. And, as already mentioned, in Prometheus on Caucasus Lucian describes Prometheus as crucified "with his hands outstretched".

The 2nd-century Odes of Solomon, probably by a heterodox Christian, includes the following: "I extended my hands and hallowed my Lord, /For the expansion of my hands is His sign. /And my extension is the upright cross (σταυρός)."

Justin Martyr (100–165) explicitly says the cross of Christ was of two-beam shape: "That lamb which was commanded to be wholly roasted was a symbol of the suffering of the cross which Christ would undergo. For the lamb, which is roasted, is roasted and dressed up in the form of the cross. For one spit is transfixed right through from the lower parts up to the head, and one across the back, to which are attached the legs of the lamb."

Like the Epistle of Barnabas, Justin saw the stretched-out hands of Moses in the battle against Amalek as foreshadowing the cross of Jesus: "If he gave up any part of this sign, which was an imitation of the cross (σταυρός), the people were beaten, as is recorded in the writings of Moses; but if he remained in this form, Amalek was proportionally defeated, and he who prevailed prevailed by the cross (σταυρός). For it was not because Moses so prayed that the people were stronger, but because, while one who bore the name of Jesus (Joshua) was in the forefront of the battle, he himself made the sign of the cross (σταυρός)."

Drawing in Justus Lipsius, De cruce. Justin Martyr: "that trophy which is called a sail abide safe in the ship"

In his First Apology, 55 Justin refers to various objects as shaped like the cross of Christ: "The sea is not traversed except that trophy which is called a sail abide safe in the ship ... And the human form differs from that of the irrational animals in nothing else than in its being erect and having the hands extended, and having on the face extending from the forehead what is called the nose, through which there is respiration for the living creature; and this shows no other form than that of the cross (σταυρός)."

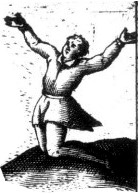
Drawing in Justus Lipsius, De cruce. Justin Martyr: "...being erect and having the hands extended...shows no other form than that of the cross"

The apocryphal Acts of Peter, of the second half of the 2nd century, attaches symbolic significance to the upright and the crossbeam of the cross of Jesus: "What else is Christ, but the word, the sound of God? So that the word is the upright beam (to orthon xulon) whereon I am crucified. And the sound is that which crosseth it (to plagion), the nature of man. And the nail which holdeth the cross-tree unto the upright in the midst thereof is the conversion and repentance of man."

Irenaeus, who died around the end of the 2nd century, speaks of the cross as having "five extremities, two in length, two in breadth, and one in the middle, on which [last] the person rests who is fixed by the nails."

Hippolytus of Rome (170 – 235 AD), writing about the blessing Jacob obtained from his father Isaac (Genesis 27:1–29), said: "The skins which were put upon his arms are the sins of both peoples, which Christ, when His hands were stretched forth on the cross, fastened to it along with Himself."

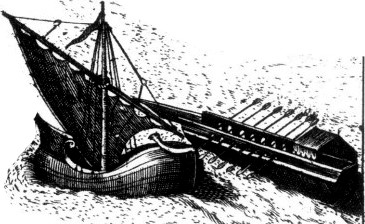
Justus Lipsius, De cruce. Minucius Felix: "ships...with swelling sails...with expanded oars"

Justus Lipsius, De cruce: military standard (cf. Minucius Felix)

In his Octavius, Marcus Minucius Felix (? — c. 250AD, Rome), responding to the pagan jibe that Christians worship wooden crosses – an indication of how the cross symbol was already associated with Christians – denies the charge and then retorts that the cross shape (a crossbeam placed on an upright) is honoured even by pagans in the form of their standards and trophies and is in any case found in nature: "Crosses, moreover, we neither worship nor wish for. You, indeed, who consecrate gods of wood, adore wooden crosses perhaps as parts of your gods. For your very standards, as well as your banners; and flags of your camp, what else are they but crosses gilded and adorned? Your victorious trophies not only imitate the appearance of a simple cross, but also that of a man affixed to it. We assuredly see the sign of a cross, naturally, in the ship when it is carried along with swelling sails, when it glides forward with expanded oars; and when the military yoke is lifted up, it is the sign of a cross; and when a man adores God with a pure mind, with hands outstretched. Thus the sign of the cross either is sustained by a natural reason, or your own religion is formed with respect to it."

In language very similar to that of Minucius Felix, Tertullian, too, who distinguished between stipes (stake) and crux (cross), noted that it was the cross that people associated with Christianity. And he indicated that the shape of the cross is that of the letter T: "The Greek letter Tau and our own letter T is the very form of the cross, which (God) predicted would be the sign on our foreheads", and compared it to the shape of a bird with outstretched wings.

The anti-Christian arguments thus cited in the Octavius of Minucius Felix, chapters IX and XXIX, and Tertullian's Apology, 16 show that the cross symbol was already associated with Christians in the 2nd century. Tertullian could designate the body of Christian believers as crucis religiosi, i.e. "devotees of the Cross". In his book De Corona, written in 204, Tertullian tells how it was already a tradition for Christians to trace repeatedly on their foreheads the sign of the cross.

So closely associated with Christ was the cross that Clement of Alexandria, who died between 211 and 216, could without fear of ambiguity use the phrase τὸ κυριακὸν σημεῖον (the Lord's sign) to mean the cross, when he repeated the idea, current as early as the Epistle of Barnabas, that the number 318 (in Greek numerals, ΤΙΗ) in Genesis 14:14 was a foreshadowing (a "type") of the cross (T, an upright with crossbar, standing for 300) and of Jesus (ΙΗ, the first two letter of his name ΙΗΣΟΥΣ, standing for 18).

For other 2nd-century instances of the use of the cross, in its familiar form, as a Christian symbol, see the references in the Jewish Encyclopedia article on the cross:

The cross as a Christian symbol or "seal" came into use at least as early as the 2nd century (see "Apost. Const." iii. 17; Epistle of Barnabas, xi.-xii.; Justin, "Apologia", i. 55–60; "Dial. cum Tryph." 85–97); and the marking of a cross upon the forehead and the chest was regarded as a talisman against the powers of demons (Tertullian, "De Corona", iii.; Cyprian, "Testimonies", xi. 21–22; Lactantius, "Divinæ Institutiones", iv. 27, and elsewhere). Accordingly, the Christian Fathers had to defend themselves, as early as the 2nd century, against the charge of being worshipers of the cross, as may be learned from Tertullian, "Apologia", xii., xvii., and Minucius Felix, "Octavius", xxix. Christians used to swear by the power of the cross (see Apocalypse of Mary, viii., in James, "Texts and Studies", iii. 118).

=== The cross in Christian art history ===
In Christian art Jesus is generally depicted as carrying a whole cross—patibulum and stipes.

=== Jehovah's Witnesses ===
Jehovah's Witnesses believe that Jesus was executed on a simple upright stake, asserting that the cross was promoted as a Christian symbol under the 4th-century emperor Constantine the Great. Their New World Translation of the Bible uses the phrase "torture stake" to translate the Greek word σταυρός (stauros) and the term "stake" to translate the Greek word ξύλον (xylon) at Matthew 27:40, Mark 15:30, Luke 23:26, and 1 Peter 2:24–25.

== Archaeology ==
The significance of the remains of Jehohanan, a man crucified in Judea in the 1st century, has been interpreted in different ways, and in any case does not prove that Jesus was executed in the same way.

The Alexamenos graffito, which was once thought to be the earliest surviving pictorial representation of a crucifixion and has been interpreted as mockery of a Christian, shows a cross as an instrument of execution. Its date is uncertain: some have posited for it a date as early as 85, but it may be as late as the 3rd century, and even thus prior to AD 300.

What now appears to be the most ancient surviving image of a Roman crucifixion is a graffito found in a taberna (an inn for wayfarers) in Puteoli, dating from the time of Trajan (98–117) or Hadrian (117–138). The cross has the T shape.
