= Descriptions in antiquity of the execution cross =

Descriptions of crucifixion methods

Descriptions in antiquity of the execution cross, whether by Christians or non-Christians, present the instrument ordinarily used in putting people to death by crucifixion as composed of two wooden pieces. Whether the two pieces of timber of the normal execution cross were permanently conjoined or were merely put together for the purpose of the execution is not stated.

Atypical executions on cross-like structures also took place, "especially when the executioners decide[d] to engage in cruel creativity", as indicated by Seneca the Younger.

== Terminology ==
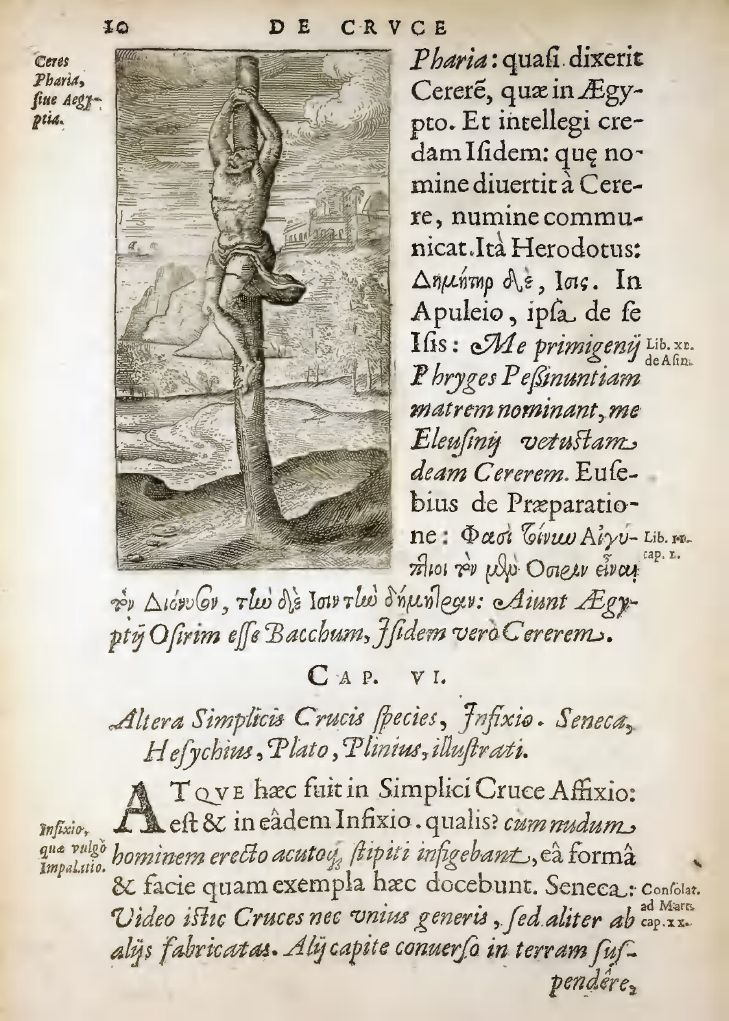
Justus Lipsius on this page distinguishes two types of crux simplex

A distinction is commonly made between a single-pole or single-stake crux simplex and a crux compacta composed of more than one piece of timber. This terminology was invented by Justus Lipsius (1547–1606) and so was not used by the Early Christians or their contemporaries.

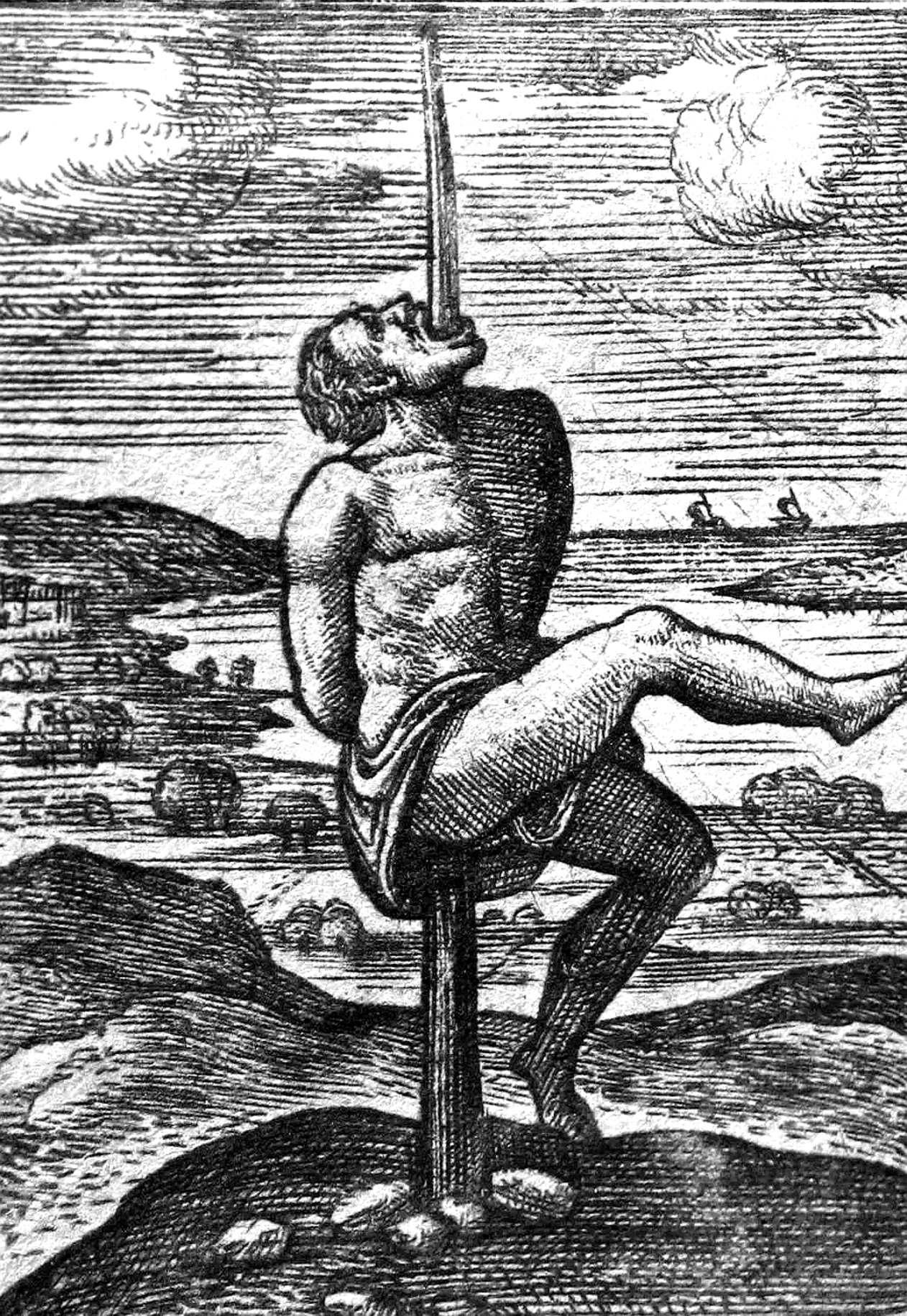
Justus Lipsius: Crux simplex ad infixionem

Lipsius distinguished two types of the transom-less crux simplex: the crux simplex ad affixionem to which the victim was attached and left to die, and the crux simplex ad infixionem with which to impale him. Similarly, he distinguished three types of crux compacta: crux decussata (X-shaped), crux commissa (T-shaped) and crux immissa (†-shaped).

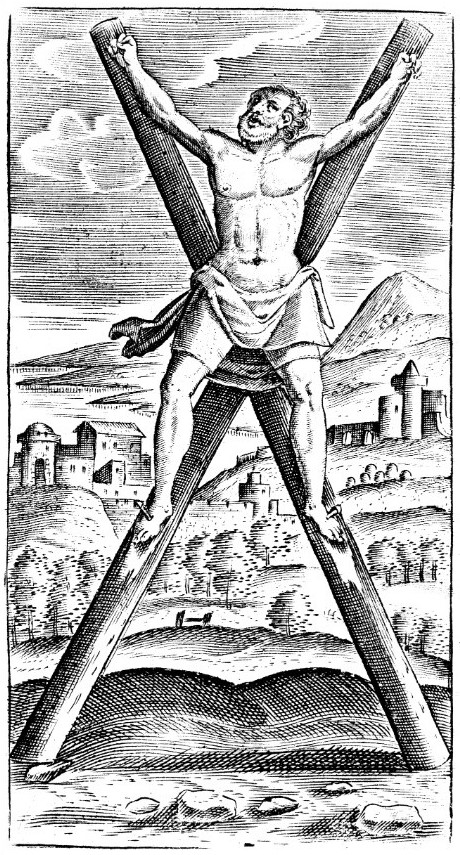
Justus Lipsius: Crux decussata, a form of cross for which there is no evidence of its use by ancient Romans: the earliest account of its supposed use for Andrew the Apostle is of the twelfth century.

Some scholars think the distinction between crux commissa and crux immissa within the crux compacta category is unnecessary. Hermann Fulda called it a meaningless distinction that Lipsius grabbed out of thin air. Others too, including Gerald G. O'Collins, do not accept all the proposed subcategories of crux compacta.

Seneca the Younger (c. 4 BC – AD 65) records the use in the first century AD of the crux compacta with transom (patibulum) and of the crux simplex ad infixionem (impalement), but does not mention the transom-less crux simplex ad affixionem; he seems to indicate that execution on a cross tended to follow a fairly common routine, while still being open to significant variations.

Departure from normal crucifixion routine is also mentioned by Josephus (37 – c. 100) in his The Jewish War: "The soldiers, out of the wrath and hatred they bore the Jews, nailed those they caught, one after one way, and another after another, to the crosses, by way of jest, when their multitude was so great, that room was wanting for the crosses, and crosses wanting for the bodies".

== Made of more than one piece ==
Irenaeus (early 2nd century – AD 202) remarks that "the very form of the cross, too, has five extremities, two in length, two in breadth, and one in the middle, on which [last] the person rests who is fixed by the nails".

The same remark is made by Justin Martyr (100–165) when commenting on the Book of Deuteronomy 33:17: "No one could say or prove that the horns of a unicorn represent any other fact or figure than the type which portrays the cross. For the one beam is placed upright, from which the highest extremity is raised up into a horn, when the other beam is fitted on to it, and the ends appear on both sides as horns joined on to the one horn. And the part which is fixed in the centre, on which are suspended those who are crucified, also stands out like a horn; and it also looks like a horn conjoined and fixed with the other horns".

To the pagan jibe about Christians being devotees of the cross, Tertullian (c. 155 – c. 240) responds by saying the pagans no less adored images of wood, with the difference that they worship what is only part of a cross, while the Christians are credited with "an entire cross complete with a transverse beam and a projecting seat". He then adds that "the very structure of our body suggests the essential and primal outline of a cross. The head ascends to the peak, the spine stands upright, the shoulders traverse the spine. If you position a man with his arms outstretched, you shall have created the image of a cross."

Justin Martyr also states: "That [passover] lamb which was commanded to be wholly roasted was a symbol of the suffering of the cross which Christ would undergo. For the lamb, which is roasted, is roasted and dressed up in the form of the cross. For one spit is transfixed right through from the lower parts up to the head, and one across the back, to which are attached the legs of the lamb."

The Acts of Peter, of the second half of the second century, expressly distinguishes between the upright beam of the cross and its crossbeam: in this early example of New Testament Apocrypha, Saint Peter, on being crucified, says: "It is right to mount upon the cross of Christ, who is the word stretched out, the one and only, of whom the spirit saith: For what else is Christ, but the word, the sound of God So that the word is the upright beam whereon I am crucified. And the sound is that which crosseth it, the nature of man. And the nail which holdeth the cross-tree unto the upright in the midst thereof is the conversion and repentance of man."

These statements by Early Christians echo those of contemporary non-Christians. Second-century Artemidorus indicated that the execution cross was made from more than one piece of wood, when he said it was good luck for someone about to undertake a sea voyage to dream of being crucified, because "a cross is made from posts and nails like a ship, and its mast is like a cross". Thus Artemidorus explicitly says that an execution cross is made from more than one wooden beam and from nails (ἐκ ξύλων καὶ ἥλων).

Dionysius of Halicarnassus (c. 60 BC – after 7 BC) mentions that, on a certain occasion, "a Roman citizen of no obscure station, having ordered one of his slaves to be put to death, delivered him to his fellow-slaves to be led away, and in order that his punishment might be witnessed by all, directed them to drag him through the Forum and every other conspicuous part of the city as they whipped him, and that he should go ahead of the procession which the Romans were at that time conducting in honour of the god. The men ordered to lead the slave to his punishment, having stretched out both his arms and fastened them to a piece of wood which extended across his breast and shoulders as far as his wrists, followed him, tearing his naked body with whips. The culprit, overcome by such cruelty, not only uttered ill-omened cries, forced from him by the pain, but also made indecent movements under the blows. This man, accordingly, they all thought to be the unacceptable dancer signified by the god." Dionysius does not specify the form of execution to which the slave was being led nor whether the piece of wood he carried on his shoulders was for the transom of an execution cross, but some scholars have interpreted it in that way.

== For outstretched arms of victim ==
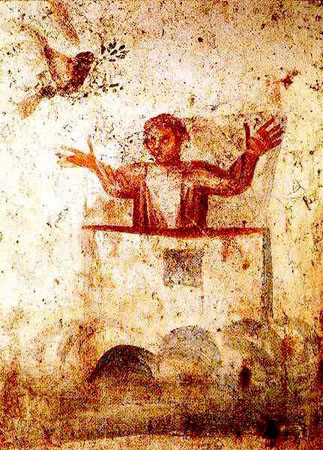
Noah in prayer posture, a fresco in the catacombs of Rome

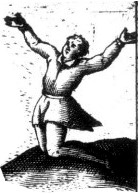
Justus Lipsius, Praying with outspread hands

The Early Christians interpreted their practice of praying with arms outstretched as a representation of the form of Christ's cross.

Tertullian saw this prayer posture reflected in nature: "The birds now arising are lifting themselves up to heaven and instead of hands are spreading out the cross of their wings, while saying something which may be supposed to be a prayer" (et aves nunc exsurgentes eriguntur ad caelum, et alarum crucem pro manibus expandunt et dicunt aliquid quod oratio videatur). Of the Christians he said that they not only lift up their hands in prayer, "but also spread them out, and, modulating them by the Lord's passion, in our prayers also express our faith in Christ" (nos vero non attollimus tantum sed etiam expandimus, et dominica passione modulantes, et orantes confitemur Christo).

According to Naphthali Wieder, it was because Christians interpreted prayer with outspread hands as referring to the crucifixion of their Messiah that Jews abandoned this prayer posture, which had previously been Jewish tradition.

Justin Martyr interpreted as foreshadowing the shape of the execution cross the episode in the Book of Exodus 17:8–13. The text says that Moses "raised" (ירים, ἐπῆρεν in the Greek Septuagint translation) his hands, without specifying in what way they were raised; but Justin uses a more specific expression to describe the posture of Moses, saying that he "spread out his hands on both sides" (τὰς χεῖρας ἑκατέρως ἐκπετάσας). He added that, when Moses relaxed some element of "this posture imitating the cross" (τοῦ σχήματος τούτου τοῦ τὸν σταυρὸν μιμουμένου), the people were defeated, but when Moses maintained it, the people prevailed "on account of the cross" (διὰ τοῦ σταυροῦ); he attributed this effect not to the prayer of Moses but to the fact that Moses "was forming the sign of the cross" (τὸ σημεῖον τοῦ σταυροῦ ἐποίει).

The same Old Testament event is interpreted in a similar way in the earlier Epistle of Barnabas, which saw as one of the prophetic signs of "the cross and him who was to be crucified on it" (περὶ τοῦ σταυροῦ καὶ τοῦ σταυροῦσθαι μέλλοντος) in what Moses did when he, "standing higher than all, stretched out his hands, and so again Israel conquered; then, when he let them down, they were again slaughtered". It says that in this Moses was inspired to "make the form of a cross, and of him who was about to suffer" (ἵνα ποιήσῃ τύπον σταυροῦ καὶ τοῦ μέλλοντος πάσχειν).

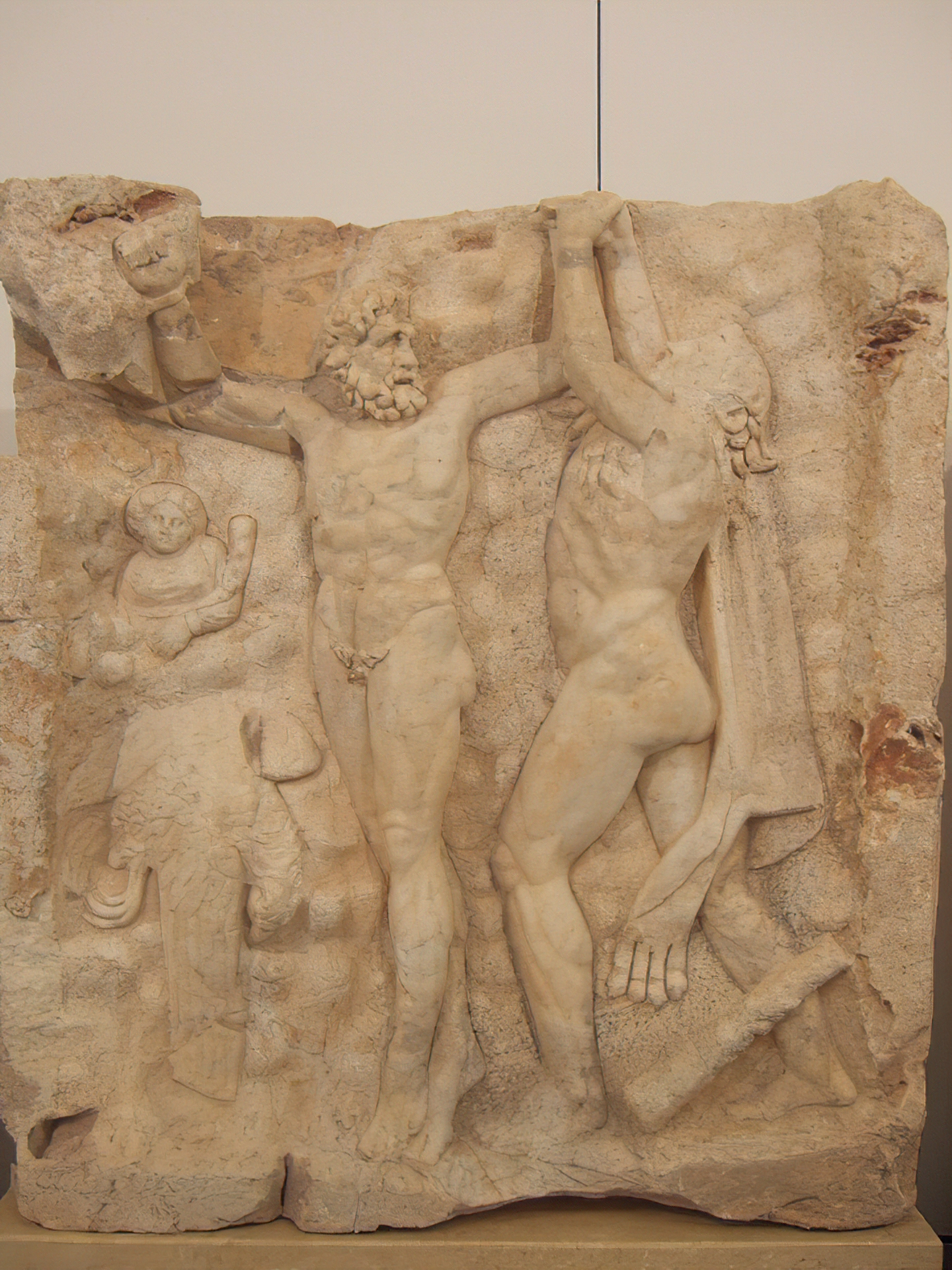
Hercules freeing Prometheus, relief from the Temple of Aphrodite at Aphrodisias, built and remodelled between 30 BC and AD 130

Justin Martyr said the cross's shape is found in things that have a transverse as well as an upright element: "The sea is not traversed except that trophy which is called a sail abide safe in the ship; and the earth is not ploughed without it: diggers and mechanics do not their work, except with tools which have this shape. And the human form differs from that of the irrational animals in nothing else than in its being erect and having the hands extended, and having on the face extending from the forehead what is called the nose, through which there is respiration for the living creature; and this shows no other form than that of the cross".

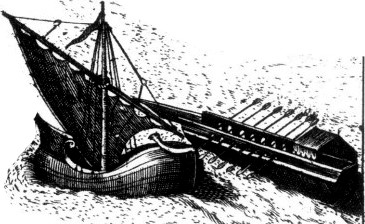
Drawing by Justus Lipsius illustrating Minucius Felix's words: "the ship when it is carried along with swelling sails, when it glides forward with expanded oars"

Later than Justin, Marcus Minucius Felix in his Octavius states: "We assuredly see the sign of a cross, naturally, in the ship when it is carried along with swelling sails, when it glides forward with expanded oars; and when the military yoke is lifted up, it is the sign of a cross; and when a man adores God with a pure mind, with hands outstretched.". Scholars dispute whether this work is earlier or later than Tertullian's Apologeticus, which is generally assigned to the year 197.

Lucian (125 – after 180) describes the situation of Prometheus chained to the Caucasus as a crucifixion with arms stretched out to right and left: "Let him hang over this precipice, with his arms stretched across from crag to crag [...] altogether a sweet spot for a crucifixion" (Fowler translation); in the original, ἀνεσταυρώσθω (let him be crucified) ἐκπετασθεὶς τὼ χεῖρε ἀπὸ τουτουὶ τοῦ κρημνοῦ πρὸς τὸν ἐναντίον [...] ἐπικαιρότατος ἂν ὁ σταυρὸς γένοιτο. and Artemidorus said it was an ill omen to dream of dancing on a height, because both the height and the stretching out of the hands presage his crucifixion as a criminal.

== Shaped like the letter T ==
The Epistle of Barnabas, written at a date estimated as between 80 and 120 or at latest 130, gives an allegorical interpretation of the number 318 (in Greek numerals τιη’) in the text of Book of Genesis 14:14 as intimating the crucifixion of Jesus by viewing the numerals ιη’ (18) as the initial letters of Ἰησοῦς, Iēsus, and the numeral τ’ (300) as a prefiguration of the cross: "What, then, was the knowledge given to him in this? Learn the eighteen first, and then the three hundred. The ten and the eight are thus denoted—Ten by Ι, and Eight by H. You have [the initials of the name of] Jesus. And because the cross was to express the grace [of our redemption] by the letter Τ, he says also, 'Three Hundred'. He signifies, therefore, Jesus by two letters, and the cross by one." (τίς οὖν ἡ δοθεῖσα αὐτῷ γνῶσις; μάθετε, ὅτι τοὺς δεκαοκτὼ πρώτους, καὶ διάστημα ποιήσας λέγει τριακοσίους. τὸ δεκαοκτὼ ι’ δέκα, η’ ὀκτώ· ἔχεις Ἰησοῦν. ὅτι δὲ ὁ σταυρὸς ἐν τῷ ταῦ ἤμελλεν ἔχειν τὴν χάριν, λέγει καὶ τοὺς τριακοσίους. δηλοῖ οὖν τὸν μὲν Ἰησοῦν ἐν τοῖς δυσὶν γράμμασιν, καὶ ἐν τῷ ἑνὶ τὸν σταυρόν). This allegorical interpretation, reading the writer's familiarity with the execution crosses and the numeral system of his time back into the situation of centuries earlier, evidently very different from modern Biblical criticism, is considered to be a classic example of midrashic interpretation of Scripture then in use among Jews and Early Christians.

Clement of Alexandria (c. 150 – c. 215) gives the same interpretation of the number τιη’ (318), referring to the cross of Christ with the expression "the Lord's sign": "They say, then, that the character representing 300 is, as to shape, the type of the Lord’s sign, and that the Iota and the Eta indicate the Saviour’s name" (φασὶν οὖν εἶναι τοῦ μὲν κυριακοῦ σημείου τύπον κατὰ τὸ σχῆμα τὸ τριακοσιοστὸν στοιχεῖον, τὸ δὲ ἰῶτα καὶ τὸ ἦτα τοὔνομα σημαίνειν τὸ σωτήριον). In the same chapter of his book, and again on the basis of the shape of the letter τ, Clement says the 300-cubit length of Noah's Ark was seen as a foreshadowing of the cross of Christ: "there are some who say that three hundred cubits are the symbol of the Lord’s sign" (εἰσὶ δ' οἳ τοὺς τριακοσίους πήχεις σύμβολον τοῦ κυριακοῦ σημείου λέγουσι).

William Barclay notes that, because the Greek letter Τ (tau) is shaped exactly like the crux commissa and represented the number 300, "wherever the fathers came across the number 300 in the Old Testament they took it to be a mystical prefiguring of the cross of Christ".

Tertullian (c. 155 – c. 240), writing in Latin, remarks that the Greek letter tau and the Latin letter T have the same shape as the execution cross: "Ipsa est enim littera Graecorum Tau, nostra autem T, species crucis".

Non-Christians too of the time when in the Roman Empire criminals were executed by crucifixion, considered identical the shape of the execution cross (σταυρός in Greek) and that of the letter tau. In the Trial of the Court of the Vowels of Lucian (125 – after 180), the Greek letter Sigma (Σ) accuses the letter Tau (Τ) of having provided tyrants with the model for the wooden instrument with which to crucify people and demands that Tau be executed on his own shape: "It was his body that tyrants took for a model, his shape that they imitated, when they set up the erections on which men are crucified. Σταυρός the vile engine is called, and it derives its vile name from him. Now, with all these crimes upon him, does he not deserve death, nay, many deaths? For my part I know none bad enough but that supplied by his own shape—that shape which he gave to the gibbet named σταυρός after him by men" (τῷ γάρ τούτου σώματί φασι τοὺς τυράννους ἀκολουθήσαντας καὶ μιμησαμένους αὐτοῦ τὸ πλάσμα ἔπειτα σχήματι τοιούτῳ ξύλα τεκτήναντας ἀνθρώπους ἀνασκολοπίζειν ἐπ᾽ αὐτά [...] ἐγὼ μὲν γὰρ οἶμαι δικαίως τοῦτο μόνον ἐς τὴν τοῦ Ταῦ τιμωρίαν ὑπολείπεσθαι, τὸ τῷ σχήματι τῷ αὑτοῦ τὴν δίκην ὑποσχεῖν).

Tertullian reports that by tradition Christians repeatedly traced on their foreheads the sign of the cross: "At every forward step and movement, at every going in and out, when we put on our clothes and shoes, when we bathe, when we sit at table, when we light the lamps, on couch, on seat, in all the ordinary actions of daily life, we trace upon the forehead the sign (Ad omnem progressum atque promotum, ad omnem aditum et exitum, ad uestitum, ad calciatum, ad lauacra, ad mensas, ad lumina, ad cubilia, ad sedilia, quacumque nos conuersatio exercet, frontem signaculo terimus). And in speaking elsewhere of the same tradition, he indicated that the sign on the forehead was that of the cross: "He signed them with that very seal of which Ezekiel spake: 'The Lord said unto me, Go through the gate, through the midst of Jerusalem, and set the mark Tau upon the foreheads of the men.' Now the Greek letter Tau and our own letter T is the very form of the cross, which He predicted would be the sign on our foreheads." (omnes fideles [...] signatos illa nota scilicet de qua Ezechiel: Dicit dominus ad me, Pertransi in medio portae in media Hierusalem, et da signum Tau in frontibus virorum. Ipsa est enim littera Graecorum Tau, nostra autem T, species crucis, quam portendebat futuram in frontibus nostris).

The universality of the Early Christian practice of tracing the sign of the cross on the forehead, not limited to the Roman province of Africa, where Tertullian lived, is shown by the fact that the Egyptian Origen, only some thirty years his junior, interprets similarly the passage of the Book of Ezekiel to which Tertullian referred, with the difference that Origen saw in the sign on the forehead of which Ezekiel spoke a reference not to the Greek letter tau, but to the letter taw of the Hebrew alphabet (ת), which earlier had the shape of a cross. Origen took this to be a prophecy of the Early Christian custom of making a cross on their foreheads when undertaking some activity, especially prayer and reading of the sacred texts.

== Visual depictions ==
=== Crucifixions ===
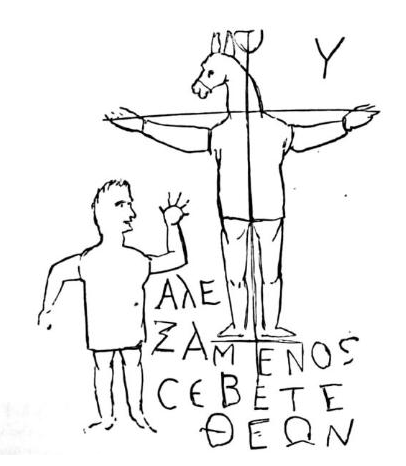
The Alexamenos graffito, probably of the third century

The oldest extant depiction of the execution of Jesus in any medium seems to be the second-century or early third-century relief on a jasper gemstone meant for use as an amulet, which is now in the British Museum in London. It portrays a naked bearded man whose arms are tied at the wrists by short strips to the transom of a T-shaped cross. An inscription in Greek on the obverse contains an invocation of the redeeming crucified Christ. On the reverse a later inscription by a different hand combines magical formulae with Christian terms. The catalogue of a 2007 exhibition says: "The appearance of the Crucifixion on a gem of such an early date suggests that pictures of the subject (now lost) may have been widespread even in the late second or early third century, most likely in conventional Christian contexts".

Better known is the Alexamenos graffito, discovered during excavation of the Paedagogium on Rome's Palatine Hill in 1857. Dated to the start of the third century, it portrays a humanoid with the head of a donkey (Christ or Anubis?) on a cross and includes an inscription in Greek.

Another graffito, known as the Pozzuoli graffito, discovered in 1959, and dated by some to the first century, by others to the beginning of the second. shows someone (scholars disagree on whether it is a man or a woman) crucified with, at least as interpreted by M. Zaninotto, the wrists nailed to the crossbar. None of these ancient depictions is sufficiently detailed to give precise information on the details of how a crucifixion was carried out, but they all show the use of a cross with transom.

=== Staurogram ===
Example of a staurogram in the Catacombs

The word σταυρός, which in the New Testament refers to the structure on which Jesus died, appears as early as AD 200 in two papyri, Papyrus 66 and Papyrus 75 in a form that includes the use of a cross-like combination of the letters tau and rho. This tau-rho symbol, the staurogram, appears also in Papyrus 45 (dated 250), again in relation to the crucifixion of Jesus. In 2006 Larry Hurtado noted that the Early Christians probably saw in the staurogram a depiction of Jesus on the cross, with the cross represented (as elsewhere) by the tau and the head by the loop of the rho, as had already been suggested by Robin Jensen, Kurt Aland and Erika Dinkler. In 2008 David L. Balch agreed, adding more papyri containing the staurogram (Papyrus 46, Papyrus 80 and Papyrus 91) and stating: "The staurogram constitutes a Christian artistic emphasis on the cross within the earliest textual tradition", and "in one of the earliest Christian artifacts we have, text and art are combined to emphasize 'Christus crucifixus'". In 2015, Dieter T. Roth found the staurogram in further papyri and in parts of the aforementioned papyri that had escaped the notice of earlier scholars.

== See also ==
- Outline of capital punishment
- Crucifix
- Early Christianity
- Instrument of Jesus' crucifixion
- Tau cross
