= Staurogram =

Combination of Greek letters tau and rho

The Staurogram, also called the Tau-Rho, and the Monogrammatic cross.

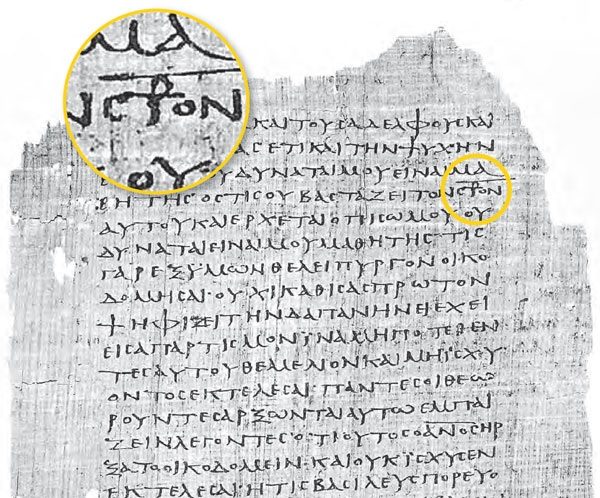
A staurogram used as τρ-ligature part of the spelling of the word σταυρον (as Ϲ̅⳨Ο̅Ν̅) in Luke 14:27 (Papyrus Bodmer XIV, 2nd century).

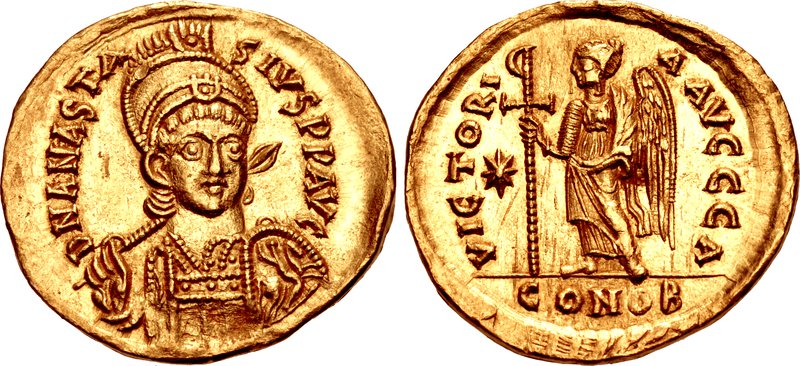
A solidus minted under Anastasius I Dicorus (struck in Constantinople between 507–518). On the obverse is Victory standing left, holding a staff surmounted by a staurogram.

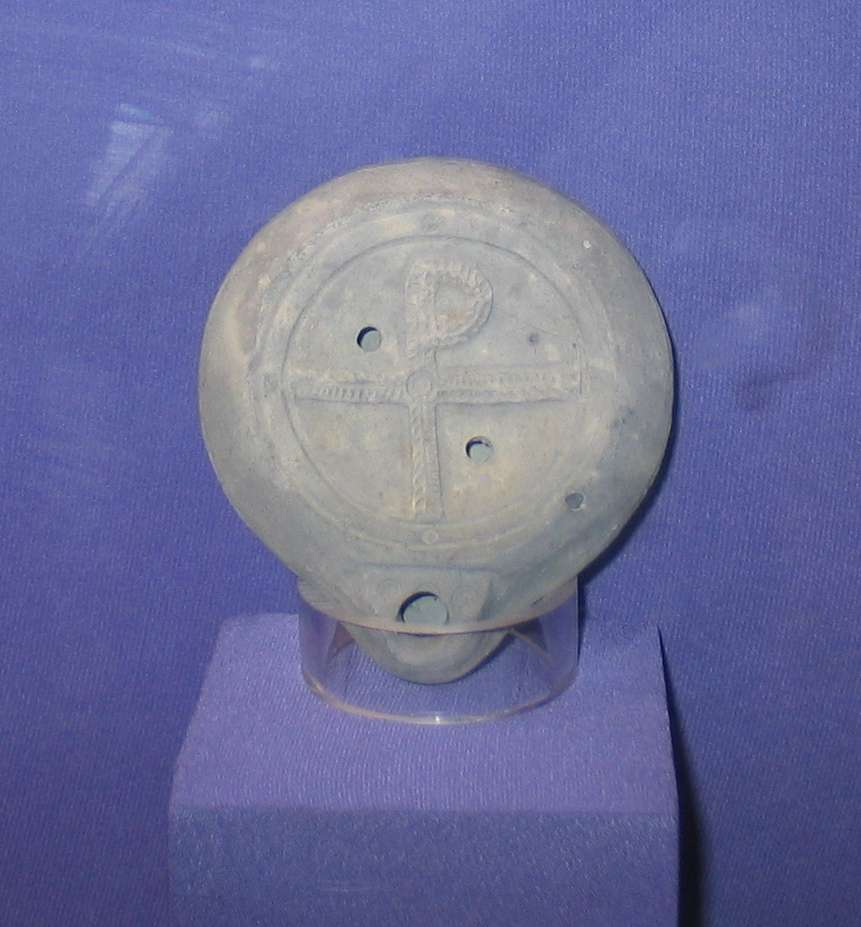
An oil lamp with staurogram from Caesarea Maritima. Glass Factory Museum, Nahsholim, Israel.

The staurogram (⳨), also monogrammatic cross or tau-rho, is a ligature composed of a superposition of the Greek letters tau (Τ) and rho (Ρ).

== Early occurrence and significance ==
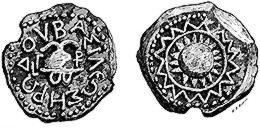
Obverse of a Herodian copper coin, bearing the legend ΒΑΣΙΛΕΩΣ ΗΡΩΔΟΥ Basileōs Hērōdou. Visible staurogram.

The symbol is of pre-Christian origin. It is found on copper coins minted by Herod I in 37 BC, interpreted as a tr ligature representing trikhalkon indicating the coin value.

=== Abbreviation for stauros ===
The staurogram was first used to abbreviate stauros (σταυρός), the Greek word for cross, in very early New Testament manuscripts such as 𝔓^{66}, 𝔓^{45} and 𝔓^{75}, almost like a nomen sacrum, and may visually have represented Jesus on the cross.

=== Monogram of Christ ===
The Tau-Rho as a Christian symbol outside its function as nomen sacrum in biblical manuscripts appears from c. the 4th century, used as a monogramma Christi alongside the Chi-Rho and other variants, spreading to Western Europe in the 5th and 6th centuries.

=== In combination with alpha and omega ===
Ephrem the Syrian (4th century) discusses a Christian symbol, apparently combining the Tau-Rho with Alpha and Omega placed under the left and right horizontal arms of the Tau. Ephrem says that the Tau represents the cross of Jesus (prefigured by the outstretched hands of Moses in Exodus 17:11), the Alpha and Omega signify that the crucified Christ is "the beginning and end", and the Rho, finally, signifies "Help" (βοήθια [sic]; classical spelling: βοήθεια), because of the numerological value of the Greek word being 100, represented by Rho as a Greek numeral.

=== Tau and rho separately ===
The two letters tau and rho can be found separately (not in ligature) as symbols already on early Christian ossuaries. Tertullian (Contra Marcionem 3.22) explains the Tau as a symbol of salvation by identification with the sign which in Ezekiel 9:4 was marked on the forehead of the saved ones. The rho by itself can refer to Christ as Messiah because Abraham, taken as a symbol of the Messiah, generated Isaac according to a promise made by God when he was one hundred years old, and 100 is the value of rho.

==== Coptic Unicode block ====
The staurogram is encoded by Unicode in the Coptic block, at U+2CE8 ⳨ COPTIC SYMBOL TAU RO, and as of Unicode 7.0 (2014) also in the Ancient Symbols block, at U+101A0 𐆠 GREEK SYMBOL TAU RHO. The Coptic block has a ligature of the full word σταυρός, where the τρ is represented by the staurogram, and two lunate sigmas are attached to either side of the tau's horizontal bar, at U+2CE7 ⳧ COPTIC SYMBOL STAUROS.

== See also ==
- Chi (letter)
- Christogram
- Descriptions in antiquity of the execution cross
- Early Christian symbols
- Greek ligatures
- Stauros
- Stigma (letter)
- Tau cross
