= Stauros =

Greek word for a stake or cross

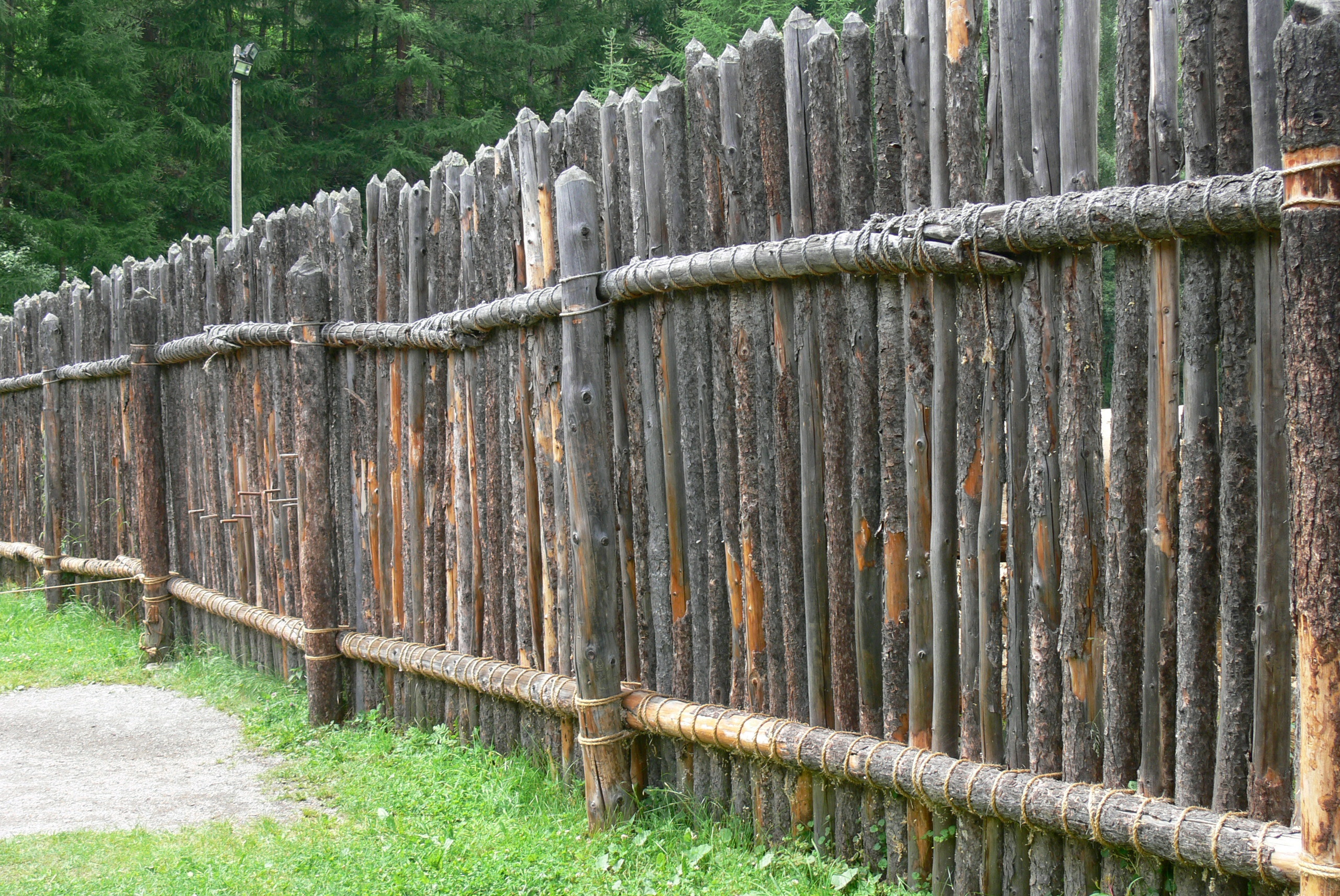
Palisade

Stauros (σταυρός) is a Greek word for a stake or an implement of capital punishment. The Greek New Testament uses the word stauros for the instrument of Jesus' crucifixion, and it is generally translated as "cross" in religious texts, while also being translated as pillar or tree in Christian contexts.

== Etymology ==
The word stauros comes from the verb ἵστημι (histēmi: "straighten up", "stand"), which in turn comes from the Proto-Indo-European root *steh_{2}-u- "pole", related to the root *steh_{2}- "to stand, to set"

== In Antiquity ==
In ancient Greek stauros meant either an "upright pale or stake," a "cross, as the instrument of crucifixion," or a "pale for impaling a corpse."

In older Greek texts, stauros means "pole" and in Homer's works is always used in the plural number, never in the singular. Instances are attested in which these pales or stakes were split and set to serve as a palisade pig sty by Eumaeus in the Odyssey or as piles for the foundation of a lake dwelling on the Prasiad Lake recounted by Herodotus.

From stauros was derived the verb σταυρόω, stauróō, 'I fence with pales' or 'I crucify'; this verb was used by Polybius to describe execution of prisoners by the general Hannibal at the siege of Tunis; Hannibal is then himself executed on the same stauros. Also from stauros was the verb for impalement: anastaurizo (Ancient Greek: ἀνασταυρίζω, romanized: anastaurízō, lit. 'I impale'). The fifth century BC writer Ctesias, in a fragment preserved by Photios I of Constantinople in his Bibliotheca, describes the impalement of Inaros II by Megabyzus in these terms. Thucydides, also in the fifth century, likewise described the execution of Inaros in this way. The practice was called anastaurosis (Ancient Greek: ἀνασταύρωσις, romanized: anastaúrōsis, lit. 'crucifixion' or 'impalement'). As described by Herodotus in the fifth century BC and by Xenophon of Ephesus in the second century AD, anastaurosis referred to impalement. Herodotus described the execution of Polycrates of Samos by the satrap of Lydia, Oroetus, as anastaurosis. According to the authoritative A Greek–English Lexicon, the verbs for "impale" and "crucify" (Ancient Greek: ἀνασταυρόω, romanized: anastauroó, lit. 'I affix to a cross' or 'I crucify', or: ἀνασκολοπίζω, anaskolopizō, 'fix on a pole or stake' or 'impale') are ambiguous. Plato refers to the punishment, in his dialogue Gorgias, using anastauroó. Plutarch, at the beginning of the second century AD, described the execution on three stakes of the eunuch Masabates as anastaurosis in his Life of Artaxerxes. Usually, Plutarch referred to stauroi in the context of pointed poles standing upright.

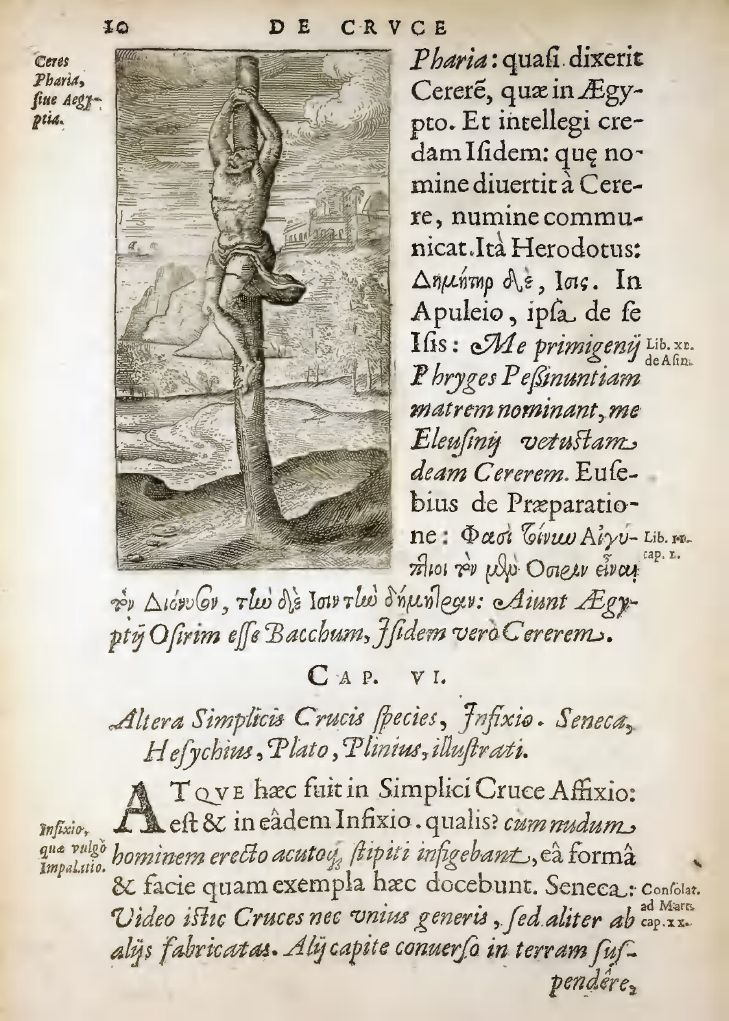
Image by Justus Lipsius of one of the two meanings that he attributed to the term crux simplex.

From the Hellenistic period, Anastaurosis was the Greek word for the Roman capital punishment crucifixion (Latin: damnatio in crucem, lit. 'sentencing to the crux'). Polybius reports the crucifixion of a Carthaginian general by his own soldiers using the verb ἀνασταυρόω, while Plutarch, using the same verb, describes Hannibal as having thus executed his local guides in his Life of Fabius Maximus, though it is unclear what kind of "suspension punishment" was involved. In the first century BC Diodorus Siculus describes the mythical queen Semiramis as threatened with 'crucifixion' (Ancient Greek: σταυρῷ προσηλώσειν, romanized: staurō prosēlōsein, lit. 'to nail up on a stauros'). Diodorus elsewhere referred to a bare bronze pole as a stauros and no further details are provided about the stauros involved in the threat to Semiramis. Lucian of Samosata instead uses the verb anaskolopizo to describe the crucifixion of Jesus. Elsewhere, in a text of questionable attribution, Lucian likens the shape of crucifixions to that of the letter T in the final words of The Consonants at Law - Sigma vs. Tau, in the Court of the Seven Vowels; the word stauros (σταυρός) is not mentioned.

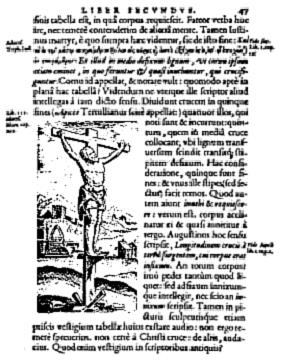
Justus Lipsius: De cruce, p. 47 Image by Justus Lipsius of the crucifixion of Jesus

== Interpretation ==
Nineteenth-century Anglican theologian E. W. Bullinger's Companion Bible glossed stauros as "an upright pale or stake", interpreting crucifixion as "hung upon a stake ... stauros was not two pieces of wood at any angle". In 1877 Bullinger wrote:

The σταυρός (stauros) was simply an upright pale or stake to which Romans nailed those who were thus said to be crucified, σταυρόω, merely means to drive stakes. It never means two pieces of wood joining at any angle. Even the Latin word crux means a mere stake. The initial letter Χ, (chi) of Χριστός, (Christ) was anciently used for His name, until it was displaced by the T, the initial letter of the pagan god Tammuz, about the end of cent. iv.

— A Critical Lexicon and Concordance to The English and Greek New Testament, 1877

Nineteenth-century Free Church of Scotland theologian Patrick Fairbairn's Imperial Bible Dictionary defined stauros thus:

The Greek word for cross σταυρός properly signified a stake, an upright pole, or piece of paling, on which anything might be hung, or which might be used in impaling a piece of ground. But a modification was introduced as the dominion and usages of Rome extended themselves through Greek-speaking countries. Even amongst the Romans the crux (from which our cross is derived) appears to have been originally an upright pole, and this always remained the more prominent part. But from the time that it began to be used as an instrument of punishment, a transverse piece of wood was commonly added: not, however, always even then. For it would seem that there were more kinds of death than one by the cross; this being sometimes accomplished by transfixing the criminal with a pole, which was run through his back and spine, and came out at his mouth (adactum per medium hominem, qui per os emergat, stipitem. Seneca, Ep. xiv.). In another place (Consul. ad Marciam, xx.) Seneca mentions three different forms: "I see", says he, "three crosses, not indeed of one sort, but fashioned in different ways; one sort suspending by the head persons bent toward the earth, others transfixing them through their secret parts, others extending their arms on a patibulum." There can be no doubt, however, that the latter sort was the more common, and that about the period of the gospel age crucifixion was usually accomplished by suspending the criminal on a cross piece of wood. But this does not of itself determine the precise form of the cross ...

— Patrick Fairbairn, Imperial Bible Dictionary, 1866

Henry Dana Ward, a Millerite Adventist, claimed that the Epistle of Barnabas, which may have been written in the first century and was certainly earlier than 135, said that the object on which Jesus died was cross-shaped, but claimed that the author of the Epistle invented this concept. He likewise defined a stauros as a plain stake.

Stauros means "an upright pale," a strong stake, such as farmers drive into the ground to make their fences or palisades — no more, no less. ... Zulon and stauros are alike the single stick, the pale, or the stake, neither more nor less, on which Jesus was impaled, or crucified. ... Neither stauros nor zulon ever mean two sticks joining each other at an angle, either in the New Testament or in any other book.

— Henry Dana Ward, History of the Cross: The Pagan Origin, and Idolatrous Adoption and Worship of the Image, 1871

A similar view was put forward by John Denham Parsons in 1896.

The stauros used as an instrument of execution was (1) a small pointed pole or stake used for thrusting through the body, so as to pin the latter to the earth, or otherwise render death inevitable; (2) a similar pole or stake fixed in the ground point upwards, upon which the condemned one was forced down till incapable of escaping; (3) a much longer and stouter pole or stake fixed point upwards, upon which the victim, with his hands tied behind him, was lodged in such a way that the point should enter his breast and the weight of the body cause every movement to hasten the end; and (4) a stout unpointed pole or stake set upright in the earth, from which the victim was suspended by a rope round his wrists, which were first tied behind him so that the position might become an agonising one; or to which the doomed one was bound, or, as in the case of Jesus, nailed. That this last named kind of stauros, which was admittedly that to which Jesus was affixed, had in every case a cross-bar attached, is untrue; that it had in most cases, is unlikely; that it had in the case of Jesus, is unproven.

Even as late as the Middle Ages, the word stauros seems to have primarily signified a straight piece of wood without a cross-bar. For the famous Greek lexicographer, Suidas, expressly states, "Stauroi; ortha xula perpegota," and both Eustathius and Hesychius affirm that it meant a straight stake or pole.

The side light thrown upon the question by Lucian is also worth noting. This writer, referring to Jesus, alludes to "That sophist of theirs who was fastened to a skolops"; which word signified a single piece of wood, and not two pieces joined together.

— John Denham Parsons, The Non-Christian Cross, 1896

In the 20th century, William Edwy Vine also reasoned that the stauros as an item for execution was different to the Christian cross. Vine's Expository Dictionary's definition states that stauros:

denotes, primarily, "an upright pale or stake." On such malefactors were nailed for execution. Both the noun and the verb stauroo, "to fasten to a stake or pale," are originally to be distinguished from the ecclesiastical form of a two beamed "cross." The shape of the latter had its origin in ancient Chaldea, and was used as the symbol of the god Tammuz (being in the shape of the mystic Tau, the initial of his name) in that country and in adjacent lands, including Egypt. By the middle of the 3rd cent. A.D. the churches had either departed from, or had travestied, certain doctrines of the Christian faith. In order to increase the prestige of the apostate ecclesiastical system pagans were received into the churches apart from regeneration by faith, and were permitted largely to retain their pagan signs and symbols. Hence the Tau or T, in its most frequent form, with the cross-piece lowered, was adopted to stand for the "cross" of Christ.

— William Edwy Vine, An Expository Dictionary of New Testament Words, 1940

In the 21st century, David W. Chapman counters that:

... the "fundamental" references to an upright pole in σταυρός [...] does not rightly imply that such terminology in antiquity, when applied to crucifixion, invariably applied to a single upright beam. This is a common word study fallacy in some populist literature. In fact, such terminology often referred in antiquity to cross-shaped crucifixion devices.

— David W. Chapman, Ancient Jewish and Christian Perceptions of Crucifixion, 2008

Chapman stresses the comparison with Prometheus chained to the Caucasus Mountains made by the second century AD writer Lucian. Chapman identifies that Lucian uses the verbs άνασκολοπίζω, άνασταυρόω, and σταυρόω interchangeably, and argues that by the time of the Roman expansion into Asia Minor, the shape of the stauros used by the Romans for executions was more complex than a simple stake, and that cross-shaped crucifixions may have been the norm in the Roman era. Presbyterian theologian John Granger Cook interprets writers living when executions by stauros were being carried out as indicating that from the first century AD there is evidence that the execution stauros was normally made of more than one piece of wood and resembled cross-shaped objects such as the letter T. Anglican theologian David Tombs suggests the stauros referred to the upright part of a two-beam cross, with patibulum as the cross-piece. Similar statements are made by Jack Finegan, Robin M. Jensen, Craig Evans, Linda Hogan and Dylan Lee Lehrke.

== See also ==
- Christian cross
- Descriptions in antiquity of the execution cross
- Instrument of Jesus' crucifixion
- Staurogram
- Staurology, or Theology of the Cross
- Stavros, the modern Greek name derived from stauros
