= William Edwy Vine =

British theologian (1873–1949)

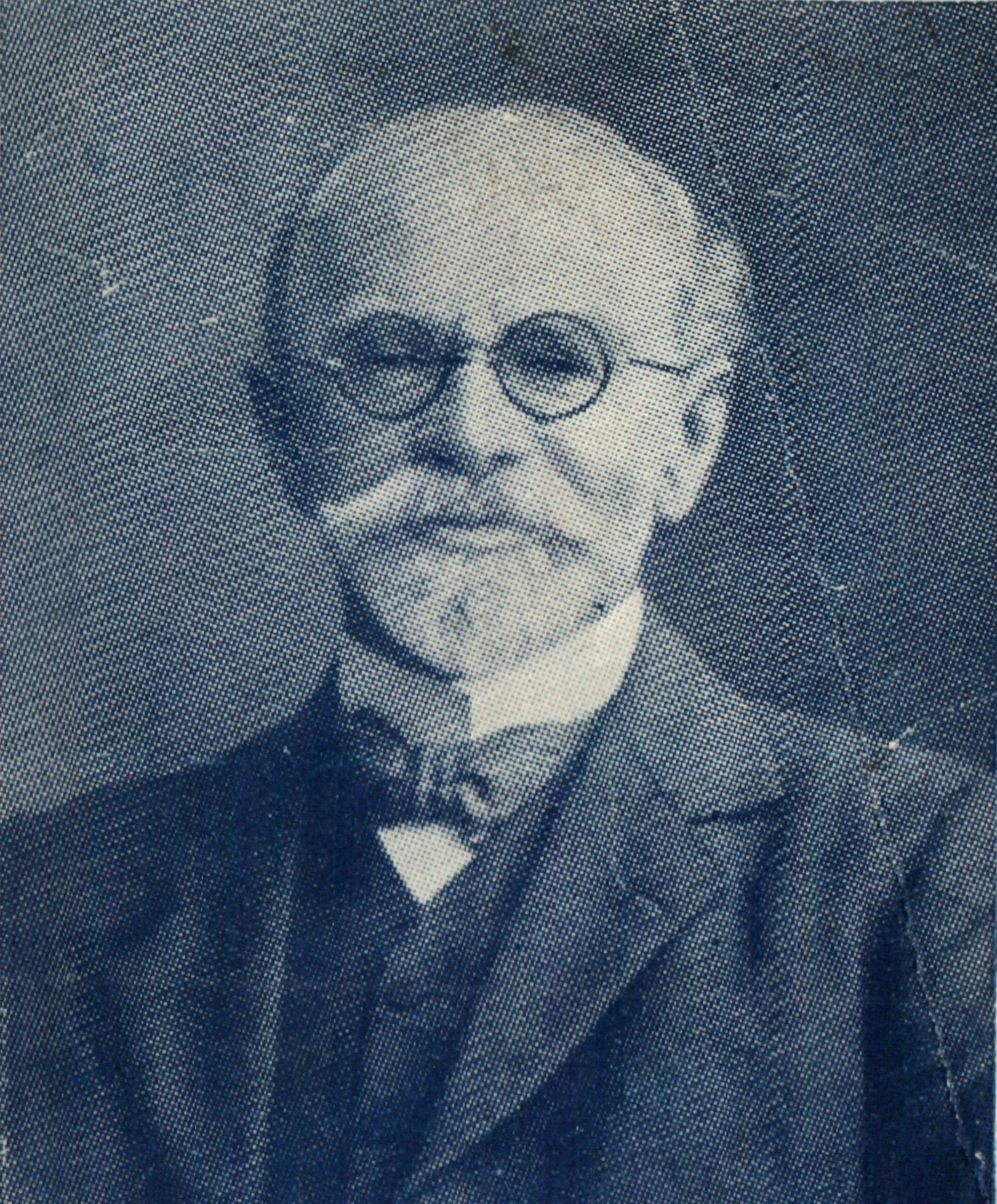

William Edwy Vine (1873–1949), commonly known as W. E. Vine, was an English Biblical scholar, theologian, and writer, most famous for Vine's Expository Dictionary of New Testament Words.

== Life ==
Vine was born in the second quarter of 1873, in Blandford Forum, Dorset. His father ran the Mount Radford School, which moved to Exeter in 1875, and it was in this location that Vine was raised. He became a Christian at an early age and was baptised in the Plymouth Brethren assembly in Fore Street, Exeter. At 17, Vine became a teacher at his father's school, before moving to Aberystwyth to study at the University College of Wales. He later completed his education at the University of London, receiving a BA and MA in Ancient Classics in 1906. Vine married Phoebe Baxendale in the 3rd quarter of 1899 in Lancashire, Phoebe's home county. In 1909, he accepted a job at the office of Echoes of Service, a missionary-support service and magazine based in Bath. In 1911, the service moved permanently to Widcombe Crescent, Bath. The 1911 census shows Vine as the Vice Principal of Mount Radford School in St Leonards, Exeter. Vine dedicated himself to his work with missionaries around the world and was firm in his doctrine and practice:

"In the mind of God the grand ultimate object of missionary activity is the planting of churches.. The Head of the church who gave His instructions to His Apostles.. .on record for us in the Scriptures, gave therein a body of truth and principles adapted to every age, generation and condition. The pattern is complete, and exhibits the divine wisdom in every part. Human tampering has only marred it in its working... It is incumbent upon all who profess the Christian faith to respect the plainly revealed intentions of the Head of the church, instead of burdening it with doctrines and regulations of human fabrication."

At this time, Vine was an Elder in the assembly at Manvers Hall, Bath, a position that he held for 40 years. He was diagnosed with heart disease in 1927, but lived until 1949.

== Writing ==
Vine began his writing career in 1905, when he conducted a correspondence course, along with C.F. Hogg, for 1 Thessalonians and Galatians. He is best known for his work Vine's Expository Dictionary of New Testament Words, first published in four parts in 1940. This lexicon traces the words of the King James Version of the Holy Bible back to their Ancient koine Greek root words and to the meanings of the words for that day. Vine also wrote a number of commentaries and books on biblical subjects.

=== List of Complete Works ===
- An Expository Dictionary of New Testament Words: A Comprehensive Dictionary of the Original Greek Words with their Precise Meanings for English Readers (1940)
- The Scriptures and How to Use Them (1910?)
- The Divine Inspiration of the Bible (1923)
- Isaiah: Prophecies, Promises, Warnings (1946)
- The Leading Themes of the Gospel of John (1924)
- John: His Record of Christ (1948)
- The Epistle to the Romans: Doctrine, Precept, Practice (1948)
- Commentary on 1 Corinthians
- Commentary on Galatians
- Commentary on Philippians
- Commentary on 1 & 2 Thessalonians
- Commentary on 1 & 2 Timothy
- Commentary on Titus
- Commentary on Hebrews
- Commentary on James
- Commentary on 1, 2, & 3 John
- Christ's Eternal Sonship
- The First and the Last
- The Coming Priest-King
- Christ the Firstborn
- The Atonement
- The Gospel of the Bible
- B.C. and A.D.
- The Gospel of the Glory
- The Twelve Mysteries of Scripture
- The Church and the Churches (nd)
- Divine Headships in the Bible: or, Whence this Authority? (1924)
- Baptism
- The Ministry of Women
- Leading in Prayer
- The Mistaken Term "The Brethren"
- The Origin and Rise of Ecclesiasticism and the Papal System
- The Divine Plan of Missions
- A Guide to Missionary Service
- Approved of God
- Service
- Touching the Coming of the Lord
- Witnesses to the Second Advent
- The Church and the Tribulation
- The Rapture and the Great Tribulation
- The Roman Empire in the Light of Prophecy
- The Four Women of the Apocalypse
- The Evolution Theory in the Light of Genesis
- Spiritism Unmasked
- New Testament Greek Grammar: A Course of Self Help for the Layman
