= Vine's Expository Dictionary =

Bible dictionary

An Expository Dictionary of New Testament Words is a cross-reference from key English words in the Authorized King James Version to the original words in the Greek texts of the New Testament. Written by William Edwy Vine (and often referred to as Vine's Expository Dictionary or simply Vine's), the dictionary was published as a four volume set in 1940. In his preface to the book, Vine wrote, "The present volumes are produced especially for the help of those who do not study Greek, though it is hoped that those who are familiar with the original will find them useful." It provides a concise meaning of the original Greek word, often providing Bible verse references as examples. If there are several Greek words that may translate to the same English word, Vine's distinguishes the shadings of meaning and connotation that may be lost in the English translation. For example, there are a number of Greek words that may be translated by the English word love.

Vine's also provides the definition of a word (as used in the King James Version) more accurately than an English dictionary, because it expands the Greek use of the word. For example, the word, "godliness" in 1 Tim. 2:2 is defined in the Merriam-Webster Collegiate Dictionary as "1: Divine 2: pious, devout -", but in Vines, it is defined as " 'to be devout,' denotes that piety which is characterized by a Godward attitude, does that which is well-pleasing to Him." So we have a fuller meaning of the word by seeing how the word is used in the NT.

Vine's can be used with Strong's Concordance. Every word is numbered with the equivalent Strong's number so you can use it more efficiently.

Vine did not write an equivalent work for Old Testament Hebrew words; however, Vine's work is sometimes combined with another author's Hebrew dictionary and marketed under Vine's name as a "complete" expository dictionary.
