= Vermehren =

Vermehren is a surname. Notable people with the surname include:

- Erich Vermehren (1919–2005), German anti-Nazi
- Isa Vermehren (1918–2009), German religious sister
- Frederik Vermehren (1823–1910), Danish painter
- Johann Bernhard Vermehren (1777–1803), German poet
- Knud Vermehren (1890–1985), Danish gymnast
- Ruth Vermehren (1894–1983), Danish Lutheran priest
