= Transport of concentration camp inmates to Tyrol =

WWII Nazi prisoner transfer

The transport of concentration camp inmates to Tyrol refers to a transfer of 139 high-profile prisoners (Prominente) of the Nazi regime in the final weeks of the Second World War in Europe from Dachau concentration camp in Bavaria to South Tyrol. 104 special prisoners and 37 family prisoners (German: 104 Sonder- und 37 Sippenhäftlinge) were liberated by the Wehrmacht on 30 April 1945.

The transport is notable for involving a confrontation between the escorting SS and SD detachments and a force of the German Army (Heer) in Niederdorf. Ultimately, the SS/SD were faced with overwhelming firepower and stood down, whereupon the army unit "adopted" the Prominente and escorted them to their final destination at the Hotel Pragser Wildsee some 12 km away. There, the prisoners were protected from both fanatical German forces and Italian partisans until relieved by a company of the U.S. 5th Army on May 4, 1945.

== Background ==
This movement was personally ordered by Adolf Hitler and implemented by Gestapo chief SS Gruppenführer Heinrich Müller. This group of Prominente comprised men, women and children from seventeen nations. Almost a third were relatives of Colonel Claus von Stauffenberg and other leaders of the attempted assassination of Adolf Hitler in July 1944. They had been imprisoned under the Sippenhaft (kin detention) law which punished relatives of those accused of crimes against the state. The remainder included renegade Soviet generals, former collaborators from a number of Axis countries, a couple of Mussolini's Police Chiefs, some senior Nazi politicians and German Army officers who had simply fallen out with Hitler. In addition, there were a number of saboteurs, spies, traitors, resistance fighters, church leaders and three survivors of the Great Escape. It also included many wives and children of key prisoners.

It was intended that these prisoners should be held as hostages in the hopes of trading their lives for some concession from the Allies as the war wore down, or after hostilities ended. The prisoners were gathered together and escorted by a detachment of SS-Totenkopfverbände and Sicherheitsdienst troopers.

== Timeline of events ==
=== Evacuation from Dachau to the South Tyrol ===
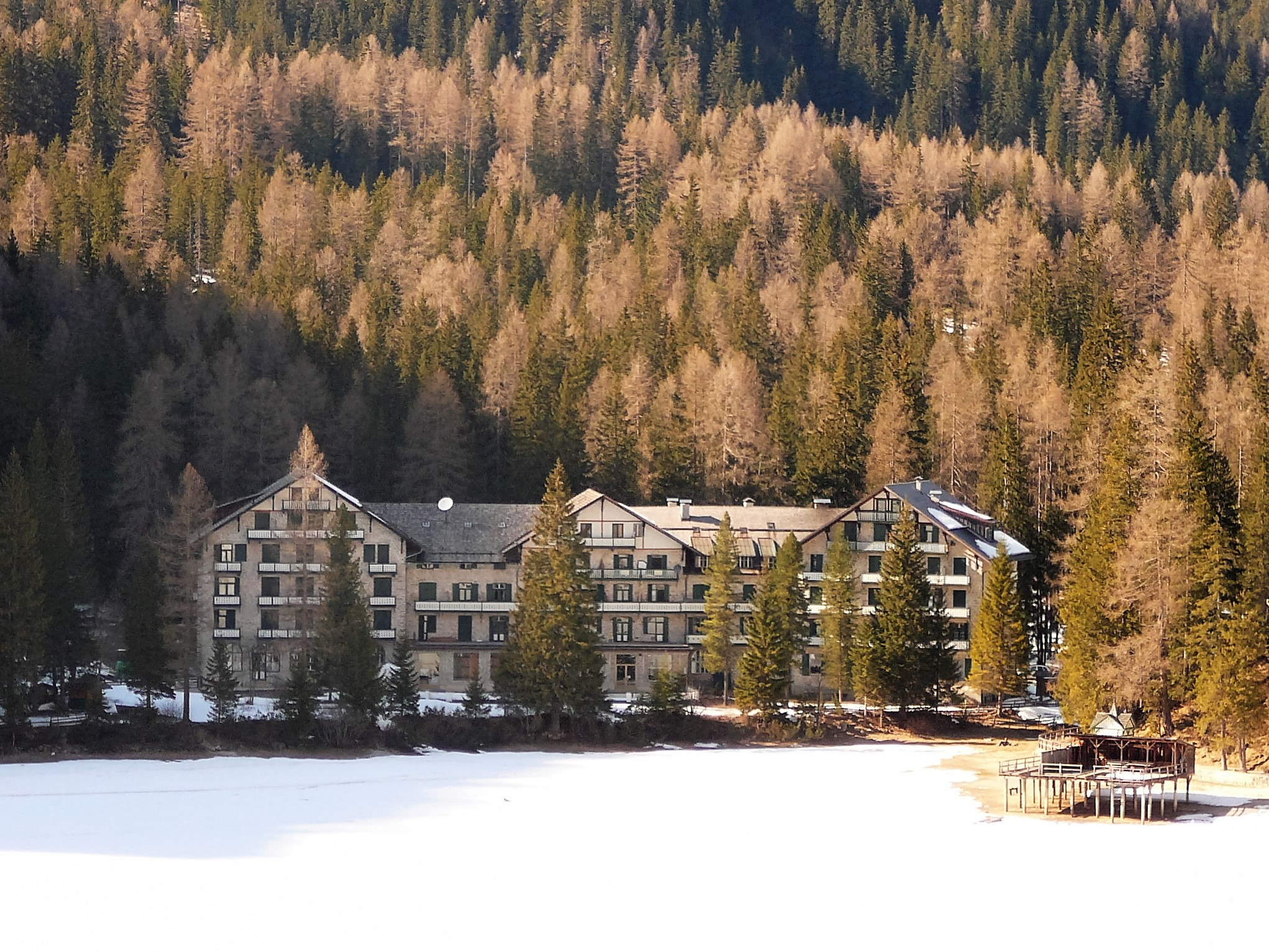
Hotel Pragser Wildsee

On 17, 24 and 26 April 1945 small convoys of buses and trucks began transporting the Prominente from Dachau toward the SS-Sonderlager Innsbruck. On 27 April the prisoners began the final leg of their journey to a large lake-side hotel at Pragser Wildsee in the Italian Tyrol 12.5 km south west of Niederdorf, then still occupied by three German Luftwaffe generals and their staff.

Making its way over the Brenner Pass the convoy entered the Italian Tyrol through the Puster Valley and eventually stopped the following morning, just outside the small village of Niederdorf (German) - Villabassa (Italian), South Tyrol, 70 km north-east of Bolzano.

=== Delay in Niederdorf ===
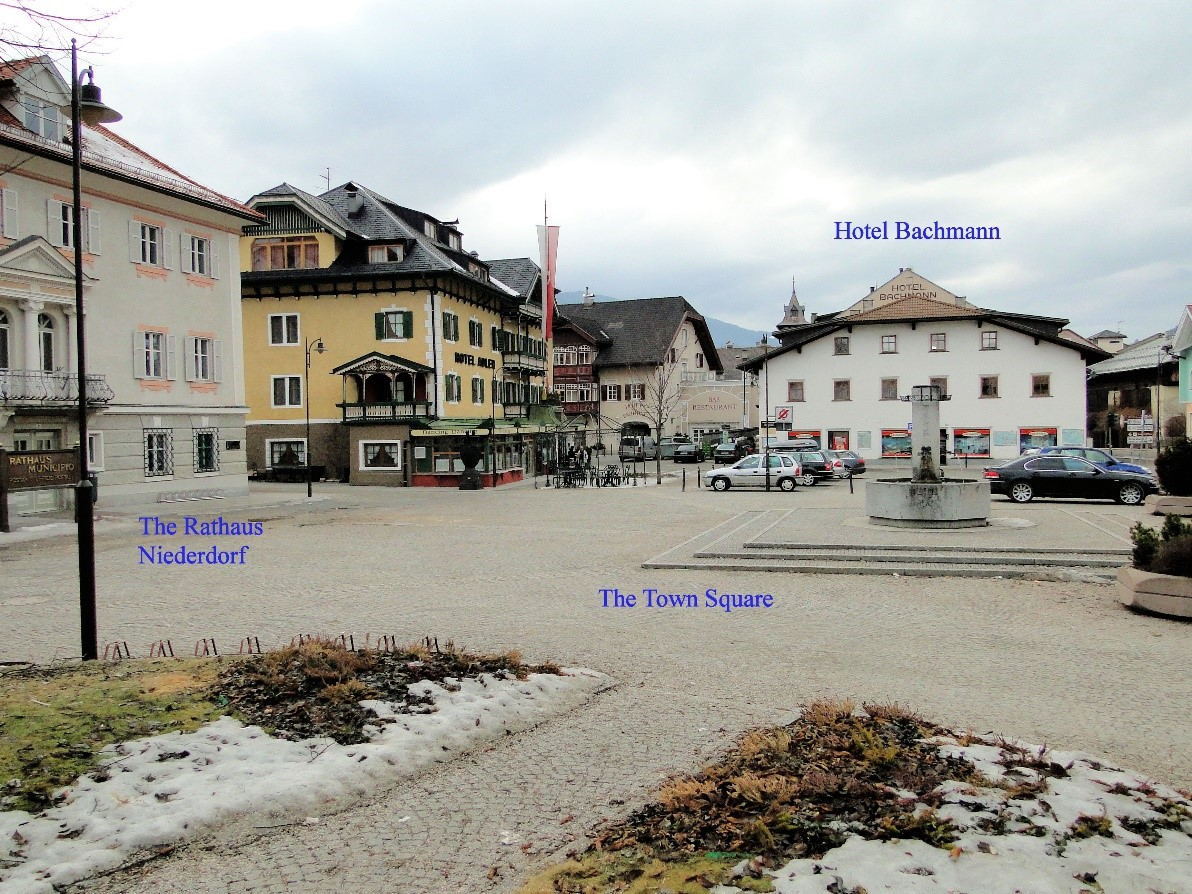
Niederdorf, South Tyrol, the scene of the denouement between the SS and the Wehrmacht on Monday 30 April 1945

In command of the SS-TV detachment was Obersturmführer Edgar Stiller, who was responsible for the transport, accommodation and general custody of the hostages. The commander of the SD detachment, Obersturmführer Ernst Bader, was also a Gestapo officer. His responsibility was to carry out whatever final orders were received from Berlin in connection with the hostages, or to execute them in the event of any resistance or rescue attempts.

As a result of the chaotic conditions in Berlin nearly all communication systems were down. Without specific orders Stiller was uncertain what to do and the situation became increasingly tense. Upon arrival at Niederdorf the prisoners took matters into their own hands by leaving the transports and walking into the village. A local official (also an Italian Resistance leader) arranged temporary accommodation for the hostages in village hotels and the Town Hall.

During the morning of 28 April one of the hostages searched the wallet of an SD man who had collapsed from drunkenness. A document in it called for the execution of 28 members of the Prominenten, including all the British officers and other military prisoners. Many of the SD and SS guards had been drinking and were becoming steadily more aggressive.

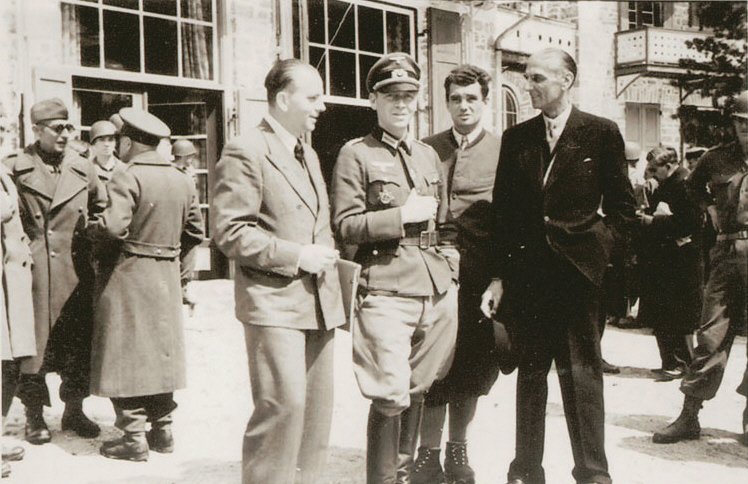
Colonel Bogislaw von Bonin (center) with fellow hostage Sigismund Payne Best (dark suit, right) shortly after the arrival of the Americans on 5 May 1945; “It was a liberation for everyone, and I believe that no one realized that for many this was to be the threshold of a new and painfully long imprisonment.” — Sigismund Payne Best

On Sunday 29 April, Colonel Bogislaw von Bonin, who had been imprisoned for disobeying Hitler by authorising Army Group A to retreat from Warsaw in January 1945, approached the local Wehrmacht liaison office in Niederdorf and asked them to contact his old friend, Colonel General Heinrich von Vietinghoff, the commander of Army Group C with headquarters in Bolzano, Italy, on the phone. He wasn't available but von Bonin was able to speak to another friend, General Hans Röttiger, Vietinghoff's Chief of Staff, and explain the highly dangerous situation and the need for assistance.

Von Vietinghoff rang back two hours later to say he would send a Wehrmacht officer and a company of infantry to provide safe custody for the hostages. In the meantime, contingency plans were being made by the prisoners to attack the SS and SD troopers who were becoming increasingly threatening. Tasked with the rescue of the Prominenten, Wehrmacht Captain Wichard von Alvensleben made a reconnaissance trip to Niederdorf later that evening. Almost immediately he bumped into Obersturmführer Stiller. Von Alvensleben, realising that this officer must have a connection with the hostages, engaged him in conversation without revealing his mission. Stiller explained that he had relinquished his authority over the prisoners to one of the British officers but expressed great concern over what might happen when his second in command, an unpredictable SD Obersturmführer, learned of his decision.

Von Alvensleben returned to his quarters at Sexten, some 17 km east of Niederdorf, to reflect on his next course of action. He had received neither permission nor an order to act against the SS; no superior in his chain of command had the authority to issue either, with the exception of his brother SS-Sturmbannfuehrer Ludolf Jakob von Alvensleben, who commanded all SS units in Adria West at the time.

At dawn on Monday 30 April, von Alvensleben returned to Niederdorf with two of his men. The party soon encountered a second SS Obersturmführer, the belligerent member of the SD he had been warned of by Stiller, Friedrich Bader. Von Alvensleben immediately engaged him, again without revealing his mission. Initially reluctant to discuss the hostages, Bader eventually stated that his orders would only be fulfilled when all the Prominenten were dead.

=== Standoff between the Wehrmacht and the SS/SD ===
At this point von Alvensleben explained that he was an emissary of the Commander-in-Chief of Army Group C and that Bader should consider his orders fulfilled and his mission over. In fact the Wehrmacht captain had no authority to negotiate or give orders to the SS. In any event Bader refused to accept his instructions. With only two men at his disposal, von Alvensleben was in an untenable position. He withdrew and quickly radioed his battalion headquarters at Sexten with a request for a battle group to be despatched to Niederdorf immediately.

Forty-five minutes later fifteen Wehrmacht NCOs armed with machine pistols arrived and positioned themselves in front of the Town Hall where the SS detachments were headquartered. Realising he needed further reinforcements, von Alvensleben summoned a larger force which was based just 4 km away at Dobbiaco.

Two hours later, 150 men from an infantry training battalion arrived and positioned two heavy machine guns in the square opposite the SS headquarters in the Town Hall. Von Alvensleben demanded Stiller and Bader remain inside with their men.

However, the young Wehrmacht captain realised he needed additional direction from his superiors at their Bolzano headquarters. By a stroke of luck SS-Obergruppenführer Karl Wolff, the Supreme Commander of all SS forces in Italy, was standing next to General Röttiger when von Alvensleben's call came through. Taking the phone from Röttiger, Wolff volunteered to von Alvensleben that the SS and SD detachments should stand down on his authority – no matter that he lacked it over either of their officers.

Throughout this Stiller and Bader, along with their men, were becoming dangerously belligerent. With the SS and SD corralled in the village square by the Wehrmacht force, it remained an extremely tense situation and a firefight between them was still a real possibility. When one of the British contingent among the prisoners drew the SD troopers’ attention to the firepower they were facing, they finally conceded and began laying down their weapons.

Eventually most of the SS and SD men were allowed to leave the village in a bus and a truck, and were last seen heading towards the Brenner Pass.

Contemporary rumours suggested that the SS and SD men were ambushed by partisans and subsequently captured and strung up from roadside telegraph poles. It has now been established that this was not true.

=== Wehrmacht surrender to US Army detachment ===
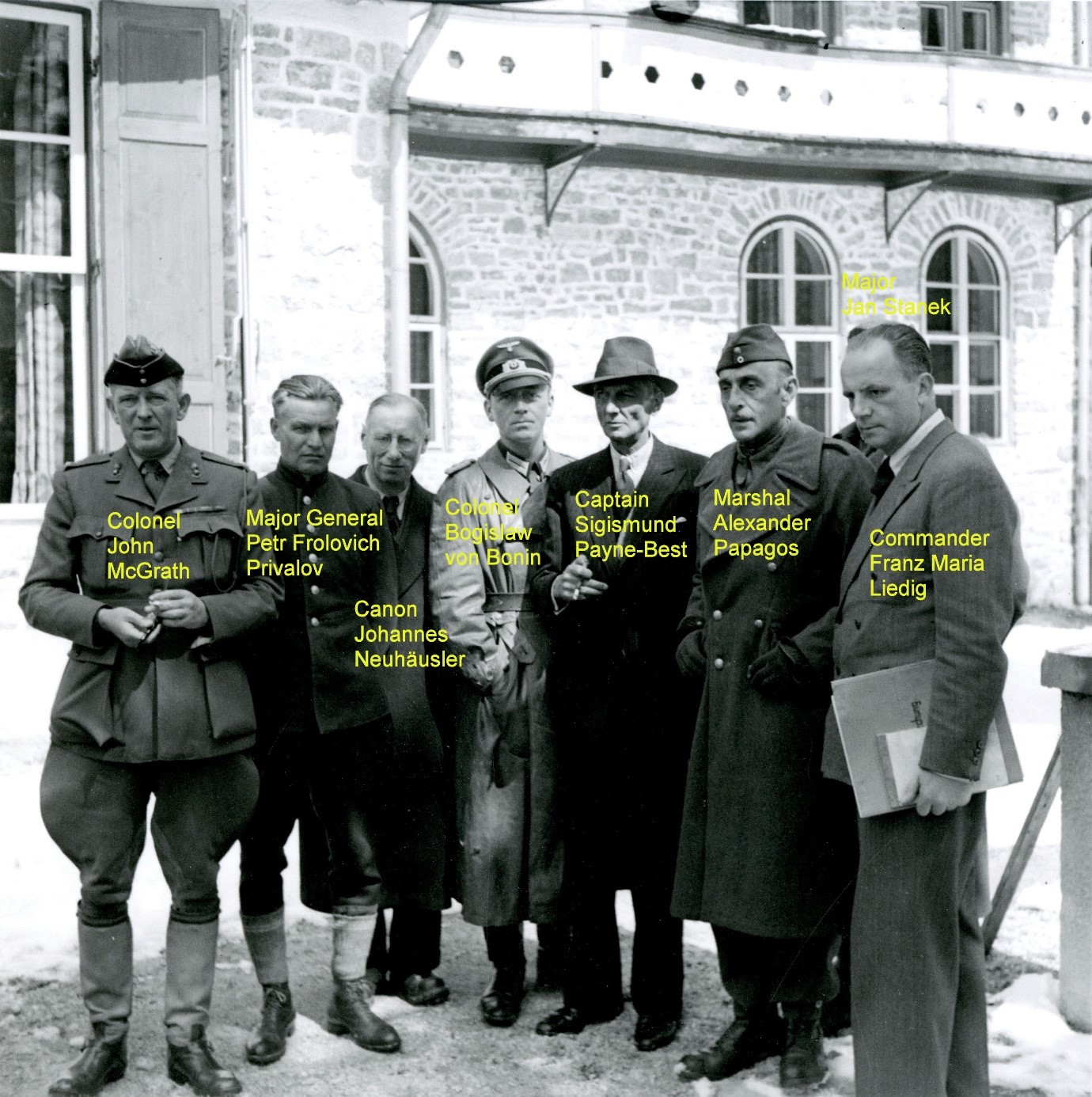
By the Wehrmacht on 30 April 1945 liberated "special prisoners" at the Pragser Wildsee Hotel, as of 4 May 1945 under American jurisdiction.

The liberated Prominenten were now free of the SS and SD, but not of danger. They were still at the mercy of German deserters, fanatical Nazis carrying on the fight, and marauding bands of Italian partisans with scores to settle.

As a courtesy, the Wehrmacht escorted the Prominenten to their original destination, the Hotel Pragser Wildsee. The Luftwaffe generals and their staffs had left; some of the hostages had also disappeared, but the majority elected to stay there under the protection of the Wehrmacht.

Great Escape Wing Commander Harry Day and the Italian resistance leader who had arranged the hostage accommodation at Niederdorf, left the hotel on 1 May to make their way to the US front line in order to persuade US forces to mount a final rescue mission.

Day and his companion finally crossed the US Fifth Army’s lines on 3 May. In the meantime, all German forces in Italy had surrendered with effect from 2 May. However, spasmodic and occasionally fierce fighting between German and US forces continued to take place. Day’s first contact was with elements of the US 88th Division, but they were in no position to mount a rescue bid as they were at least 125 miles from the Pragser Wildsee. On the other hand, the 85th Division’s 339th Infantry Regiment had reached their latest objective at San Candido half an hour after midnight on 4 May. Just 21 km from Pragser Wildsee, they received immediate orders to send a "strong combat patrol" to rescue the hostages.

G Company of the 339th was nominated for the task and arrived during the early hours of 4 May in a convoy of trucks, jeeps, and armoured carriers.

There was a tense silence as the Wehrmacht machine gunners and the American infantrymen saw each other in the gloom of the dawn, but when the Wehrmacht sentries realised that the soldiers were American and not German foes, they laid down their weapons and surrendered. The Prominenten were now officially liberated, and their Wehrmacht chaperones relieved of their duty.

== List of prisoners ==
(by country)

Austria (5)

- Konrad Praxmarer, author
- Richard Schmitz, former mayor of Vienna
- Kurt Schuschnigg, former Austrian chancellor
- Vera Schuschnigg, wife of Kurt Schuschnigg, and their daughter Maria Dolores Elisabeth Schuschnigg both joined the transport voluntarily and were not officially prisoners

Czechoslovakia (2)

- Josef Burda, Merchant
- Jan Rys-Rozsévač, Journalist

Denmark (6)

- Hans Frederik Hansen, Danish SOE-agent "Frederiksen"
- Adolf Theodor Larsen, Danish SOE-agent "Andy"
- Jørgen Lønborg Friis Mogensen, Vice Consul
- Hans Lunding, Capt., Chief of Danish Intelligence
- Max Mikkelsen, Merchant Marine Capt
- Knud Pedersen, Merchant Marine Capt.

France (6+1)

- Jeanne Blum, wife of Léon Blum
- Léon Blum, former Prime Minister of France
- Prince Xavier of Bourbon-Parma
- Armand Mottet
- Gabriel Piguet, Bishop of Clermont-Ferrand
- Raymond Van Wymeersch, Free French Air Force Capitain
- Joseph Joos, German journalist and politician (Zentrum)

Joseph Joos was released to France

Germany (29-1+37)

- Bogislaw von Bonin, Colonel, Wehrmacht officer
- Baron Fritz Cerrini, private secretary of Prince Friedrich Leopold of Prussia
- Friedrich Engelke, merchant
- Alexander von Falkenhausen, General, former military commander of Belgium and France
- Wilhelm von Flügge, Director of I. G. Farben
- Prince Friedrich Leopold, Prince of Prussia
- Franz Halder, General, former Chief of the General Staff
- Gertrud Halder, wife of Franz Halder
- Anton Hamm, Kaplan
- Erich Heberlein, diplomat
- Margot Heberlein, wife of Dr. Erich Heberlein
- Horst Hoepner, merchant, brother of General Erich Hoepner
- Karl Kunkel, Kaplan
- Franz Maria Liedig, Kriegsmarine officer (Abwehr)
- Josef Müller, officer (Abwehr)
- Johann Neuhäusler, Domkapitular
- Martin Niemöller, Pastor
- Heidel Nowakowski
- Horst von Petersdorff, Wehrmacht officer
- Prince Philipp of Hesse, diplomat
- Hermann Pünder, officer
- Hjalmar Schacht, former president of the Reichsbank and Economics Minister
- Fabian von Schlabrendorff, Ordnance Officer, adjutant of Major General Henning von Tresckow
- Georg Thomas, General
- Amélie Thyssen, wife of Fritz Thyssen
- Fritz Thyssen, businessman
- Wilhelm Visintainer, cook, inmate of the Dachau concentration camp
- Paul Wauer, barber, inmate of the Dachau concentration camp

Greece (7)

- Konstantinos Bakopoulos, Lt. General
- Panagiotis Dedes, Lt. General
- Vassilis Dimitrion, Soldier
- Nikolaos Grivas, Corporal
- Georgios Kosmas, Lt. General
- Alexandros Papagos, Lt. General, Commander in Chief of the Greek Army
- Ioannis Pitsikas, Lt. General

Hungary (10)

- Aleksander Ginzery, Col.
- Josef Hatz, Major
- Samuel Hatz, Teacher, father of Josef Hatz
- Andreas Hlatky, Hungarian Secretary of State
- Miklós Horthy, Jr., diplomat, son of Hungarian regent Miklós Horthy
- General Géza Igmándy-Hegyessy
- Miklós Kállay, former Prime Minister of Hungary
- Julius Király, Col.
- Desiderius Ónody, Secretary of Horthy Jr.
- Baron Péter Schell, Hungarian Minister of Interior

Italy (7)

- Amechi, Civil Servant –
- Eugenio Apollonio, Vice-Capo della Polizia (deputy Chief of the Police) of the Italian Social Republic
- Mario Badoglio, Son of Marshall Pietro Badoglio
- Burtoli, Civil Servant
- Davide Ferrero, Col.
- Sante Garibaldi, General
- Tullio Tamburini, Chief of the Police of the Italian Social Republic

Latvia (1)

- Gustavs Celmiņš, Army Reserve Capt.

Netherlands (1)

- Johannes J. C. van Dijk, Defence Minister

Norway (1)

- Arne Dæhli, Navy Capt.

Poland (3)

- Jan Izycki, British RAF Pilot Officer
- Stanislaw Jensen, British RAF Pilot Officer
- Count Aleksander Zamoyski, major

Slovakia (2)

- Imrich Karvaš, Governor of Slovak National Bank
- Ján Stanek, Major

Soviet Union (6)

- Ivan Georgievich Bessonov, General and commander of the GULAG Operation
- Victor Brodnikov, Lt. Colonel
- Fyodor Ceredilin, Soldier
- Vassily Vassilyevich Kokorin, Lt.
- Pyotr Privalov, Major General
- Nikolay Rutschenko, Lt.

Sweden (1)

- Carl Edquist, SS-Obersturmführer

Ireland (2)

- John McGrath, Lt. Colonel
- Patrick O'Brien, Soldier

United Kingdom (12)

- Sigismund Payne Best, Capt., Secret Intelligence Service
- Jack Churchill, Lt. Colonel, Commandos
- Peter Churchill, Captain, Special Operations Executive
- Thomas Cushing, Staff Sgt.
- Harry Day, RAF Wing Commander
- Sydney Dowse, RAF Flight Lt.
- Hugh Falconer, RAF Squadron Ldr. Special Operations Executive
- Wadim Greenewich, Foreign Office Passport Control Dept.
- Bertram James, RAF Flight Lt.
- John Spence, Farmer
- Richard Henry Stevens, Lt. Colonel
- Andrew Walsh, RAF Aircraft Fitter

Yugoslavia (3)

- Hinko Dragić-Hauer, Lt. Colonel
- Novak Popovic, Head of the post administration
- Dimitrije Tomalevsky, journalist

The kin prisoners (37)

- Fey von Hassell, daughter of Ulrich von Hassell
- Annelise Gisevius, sister of Hans-Bernd Gisevius
- Anneliese Goerdeler wife of Carl Goerdeler
- Benigna Goerdeler, daughter of Goerdeler
- Gustav Goerdeler, brother of Goerdeler
- Marianne Goerdeler, daughter of Anneliese and Carl Goerdeler
- Irma Goerdeler wife of Ulrich Goerdeler, daughter in law of Anneliese and Carl Goerdeler
- Jutta Goerdeler, cousin of Benigna Goerdeler
- Reinhard Goerdeler, son of Anneliese and Carl Goerdeler (not at the Pragser Wildsee Hotel)
- Ulrich Goerdeler, son of Anneliese and Carl Goerdeler
- Käte Gudzent
- Franz von Hammerstein, son of Maria and Kurt von Hammerstein-Equord; (not at the Pragser Wildsee Hotel)
- Hildur von Hammerstein, daughter of Maria and Kurt von Hammerstein-Equord
- Maria von Hammerstein-Equord, wife of Kurt von Hammerstein-Equord
- Anna-Luise von Hofacker, daughter of Cäsar von Hofacker
- Eberhard von Hofacker, son of Cäsar von Hofacker
- Ilse Lotte von Hofacker, wife of Cäsar von Hofacker
- Peter Jehle, (not at the Pragser Wildsee Hotel)
- Elisabeth Kaiser, daughter of Therese Kaiser
- Therese Kaiser
- Arthur Kuhn, lawyer
- Anni von Lerchenfeld, mother in law of Claus Schenk Graf von Stauffenberg; died in the SS camp in Matzkau
- Lini Lindemann, wife of General Fritz Lindemann
- Josef Mohr, brother of Therese Kaiser
- Käthe Mohr, wife of Josef Mohr
- Gisela Gräfin von Plettenberg-Lenhausen, daughter of Walther Graf von Plettenberg-Lenhausen
- Walther Graf von Plettenberg-Lenhausen, merchant
- Dietrich Schatz, major, (not at the Pragser Wildsee Hotel)
- Alexander Schenk Graf von Stauffenberg, brother of Claus Schenk Graf von Stauffenberg
- Alexandra Schenk Gräfin von Stauffenberg, daughter of Markwart Schenk Graf von Stauffenberg
- Clemens Schenk Graf von Stauffenberg, son of Markwart Schenk Graf von Stauffenberg
- Elisabeth Schenk Gräfin von Stauffenberg, wife of Clemens Schenk Graf von Stauffenberg
- Inèz Schenk Gräfin von Stauffenberg, daughter of Markwart Schenk Graf von Stauffenberg
- Maria Schenk Gräfin von Stauffenberg, wife of Berthold Schenk Graf von Stauffenberg
- Marie-Gabriele Schenk Gräfin von Stauffenberg, daughter of Elisabeth Schenk Gräfin von Stauffenberg and Clemens Schenk Graf von Stauffenberg
- Markwart Schenk Graf von Stauffenberg (senior), Colonel
- Markwart Schenk Graf von Stauffenberg Jr, son of Elisabeth Schenk Gräfin von Stauffenberg and Clemens sen. Schenk Graf von Stauffenberg, (not at the Pragser Wildsee Hotel)
- Otto Philipp Schenk Graf von Stauffenberg, son of Elisabeth Schenk Gräfin von Stauffenberg and Clemens sen. Schenk Graf von Stauffenberg
- Hans-Dietrich Schröder, son of Ingeborg Schröder.
- Harring Schröder, son of Ingeborg Schröder
- Ingeborg Schröder
- Sybille-Maria Schröder, daughter of Ingeborg Schröder
- Isa Vermehren, comedian, sister of Erich Vermehren

== Sources ==
- Sayer Ian & Dronfield Jeremy. Hitler's Last Plot – The 139 VIP hostages Selected for Death in the Final Days of World War II. ISBN 978-03-0692-155-1 New York: Da Capo Press, 2019
- Hans-Günter Richardi, SS-Geiseln in der Alpenfestung ISBN 978-88-7283-229-5 (in German)
- Pragser Wildsee.com (in German)
- Peter Koblank: Die Befreiung der Sonder- und Sippenhäftlinge in Südtirol, Online-Edition Mythos Elser 2006 (in German)
- ECHO Tirol 10 November 2005 (in German)
- Fey von Hassell, Hostage of the Third Reich: The Story of My Imprisonment and Rescue from the SS, ISBN 978-0-684-19080-8
- Endgame 1945 The Missing Final Chapter of World War II ISBN 978-0-316-10980-2
- Klaus-Dietmar Henke, Die amerikanische Besetzung Deutschlands, ISBN 3-486-56175-8 (in German)
- Kurt von Schuschnigg: Austrian Requiem, Victor Gollancz 1946, London.
