= Jack Churchill =

British Army officer (1906–1996)

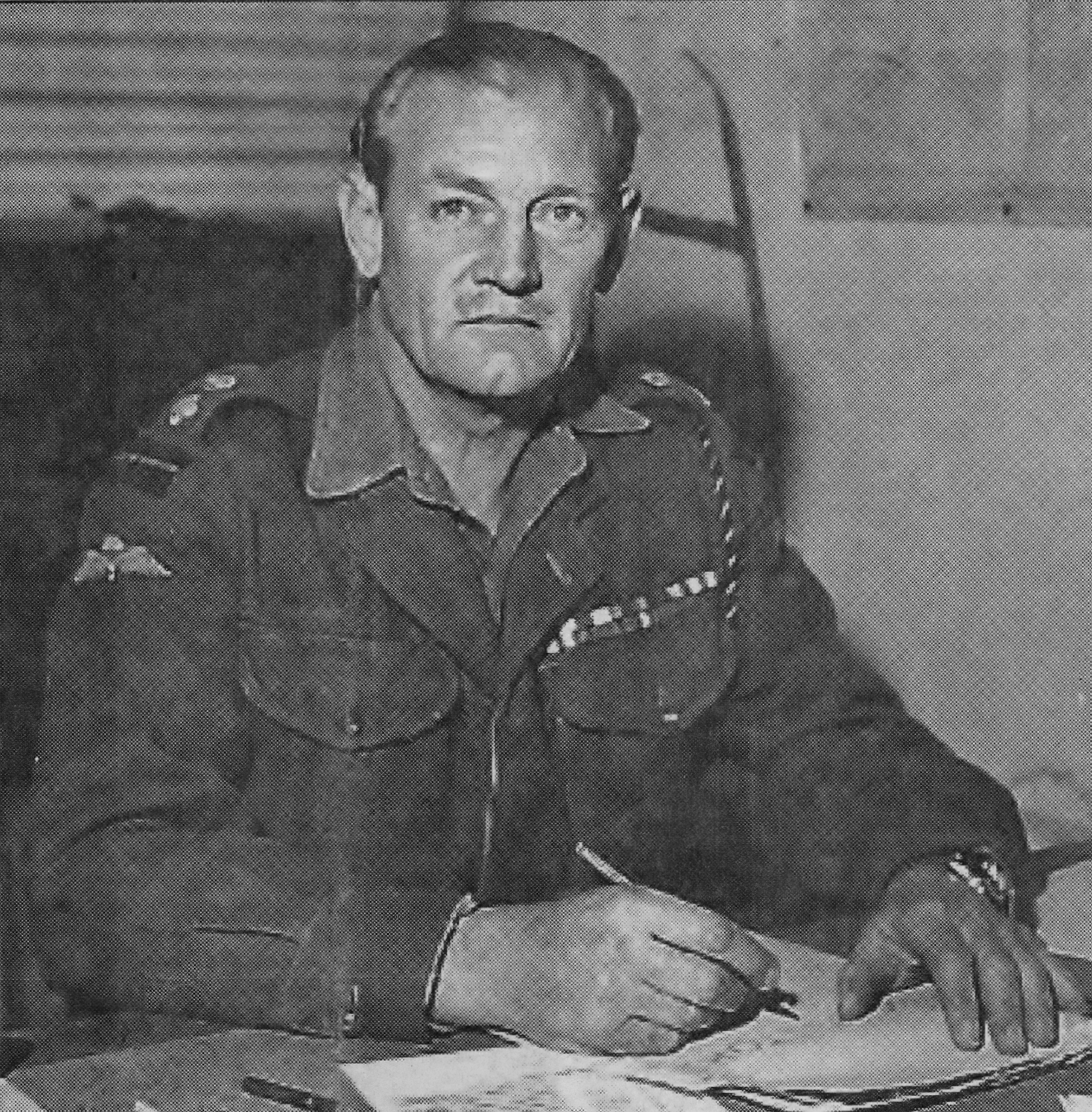
- "Mad Jack" Churchill
- Born: 16 September 1906; Colombo, British Ceylon
- Died: 8 March 1996 (aged 89); Chertsey, Surrey, England
- Military career
- Allegiance: United Kingdom
- Branch: British Army
- Service years: 1926–1936; 1939–1959
- Rank: Lieutenant Colonel
- Nicknames: Fighting Jack Churchill; Mad Jack
- Units: Manchester Regiment; 5th (Scottish) Parachute Battalion; Seaforth Highlanders; Highland Light Infantry
- Commands: No. 2 Commando
- Conflicts: Burma Rebellion 1930–32; Second World War; 1948 Palestine War
- Awards: Companion of the Distinguished Service Order & Bar; Military Cross & Bar

John Malcolm Thorpe Fleming Churchill, DSO & Bar, MC & Bar (16 September 1906 – 8 March 1996) was a British Army officer who served in the Second World War. Nicknamed "Fighting Jack Churchill" and "Mad Jack", became known for going into action with a broadsword, longbow, and a set of bagpipes. Born in Colombo, British Ceylon, Churchill graduated from the Royal Military College, Sandhurst in 1926 and served in Burma with the Manchester Regiment. He left the army in 1936 and worked as a newspaper editor in Nairobi and as a model, and represented Great Britain at the 1939 World Archery Championships. He returned to service in 1939, fought in France with the British Expeditionary Force, and after Dunkirk volunteered for the Commandos. Churchill was second in command of No. 3 Commando in Operation Archery, the December 1941 raid on Vågsøy, Norway. In 1943 he led No. 2 Commando in Sicily and at Salerno, where his captured of a German observation post earned him him the DSO. In 1944 he led Commandos on the island of Vis in support of Tito's Partisans. He was captured on Brač after being knocked unconscious by a grenade, was interrogated in Berlin and was held as a concentration camp prisoner until 1945. He served in Palestine in 1948 and remained in the army until 1959. Some popular accounts say he killed a German soldier with a longbow but Churchill himself said his bows had been crushed early in the campaign.

== Early life ==
Churchill was born in Colombo, British Ceylon, to Alec Fleming Churchill (1876–1961), later of Hove, East Sussex, and Elinor Elizabeth, daughter of John Alexander Bond Bell, of Kelnahard, County Cavan, Ireland, and of Dimbula, Ceylon. Alec, of a family long settled at Deddington, Oxfordshire, had been District Engineer in the Ceylon Civil Service, in which his father, John Fleming Churchill (1829–1894), had also served. Soon after Jack's birth, the family returned to Dormansland, Surrey, where his younger brother, Thomas Bell Lindsay Churchill (1907–1990), was born.

In 1910, the Churchills moved to British Hong Kong when Alec Churchill was appointed as Director of Public Works there; he also served as a member of the Executive Council. The Churchills' third and youngest son, Robert Alec Farquhar Churchill, later a lieutenant in the Royal Navy and Fleet Air Arm, was born in Hong Kong in 1911. The family returned to England in 1917.

Churchill was educated at King William's College on the Isle of Man. He graduated from the Royal Military College, Sandhurst, in 1926 and served in Burma with the Manchester Regiment. He enjoyed riding a motorbike in Burma.

Churchill left the army in 1936 and worked as a newspaper editor in Nairobi, Kenya, and as a model. He took second place in the 1938 military piping competition at the Aldershot Tattoo. He used his archery talent to play a small role in the 1940 film The Thief of Bagdad. In 1939 he represented Great Britain at the World Archery Championships in Oslo, where he got 26th place.

== Second World War ==
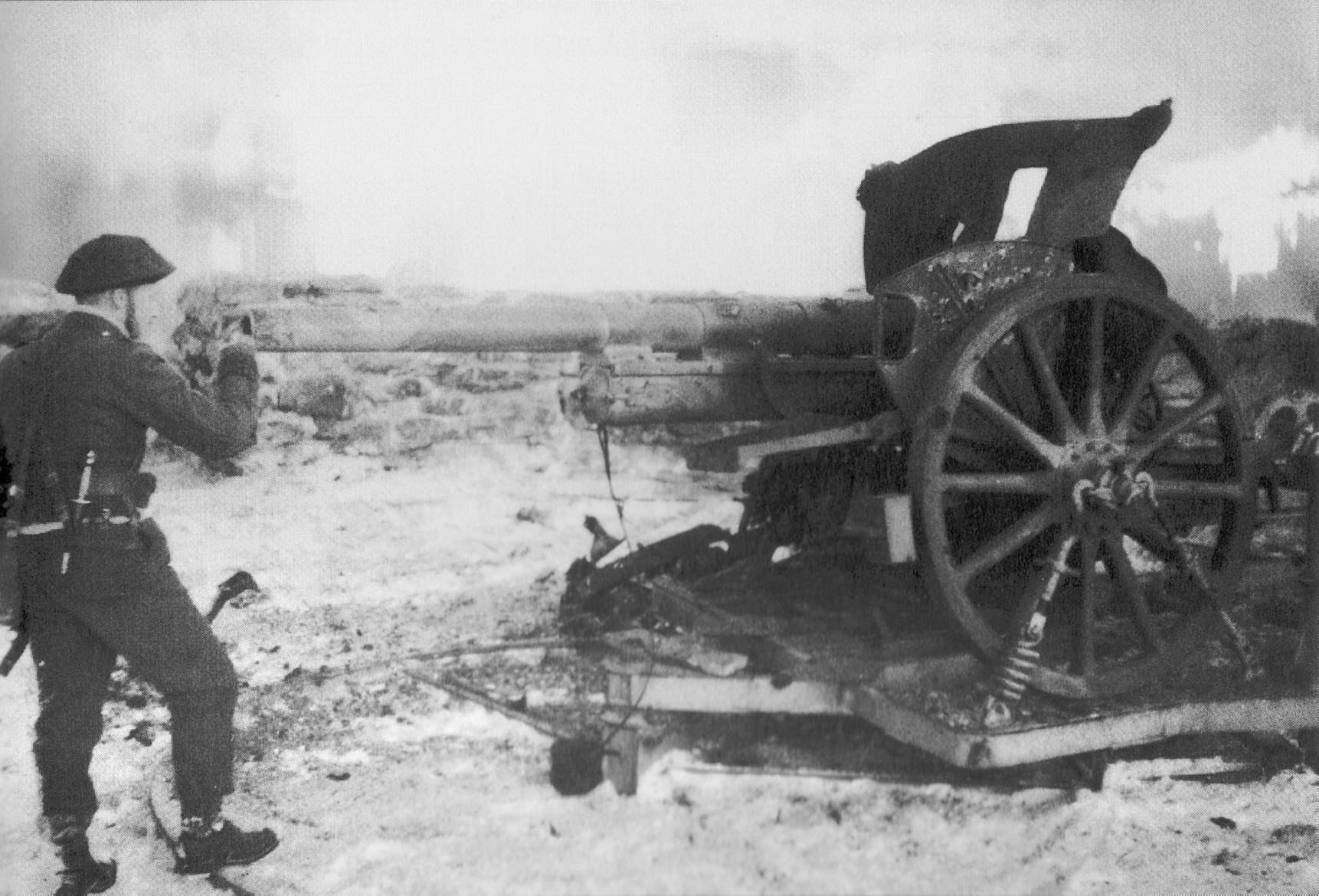
Churchill stares down the barrel of a captured Belgian 75 mm field gun.

=== France (1940) ===
Churchill resumed his commission after Nazi Germany invaded Poland in September 1939 and was assigned to the Manchester Regiment, which was sent to France in the British Expeditionary Force.

A common story is that Churchill killed a German with a longbow. However, Churchill himself later said that his bows had been crushed by a lorry earlier in the campaign. After fighting at Dunkirk, he volunteered for the Commandos.

Jack's younger brother, Thomas Churchill, also served with and led a commando brigade during the war. After the war, Thomas wrote a book, Commando Crusade, that details some of the brothers' experiences during the war. Their youngest brother, Robert, also known as 'Buster', served in the Royal Navy and was killed in action in 1942.

=== Norway (1941) ===
Churchill was second in command of No. 3 Commando in Operation Archery, a raid on the German garrison at Vågsøy, Norway, on 27 December 1941. As the ramps fell on the first landing craft, Churchill and his Commando leapt forward from their position, while he was playing "March of the Cameron Men" on his bagpipes. They overran the garrison in less than ten minutes, killing or capturing all the enemy soldiers they encountered.

=== Italy (1943) ===
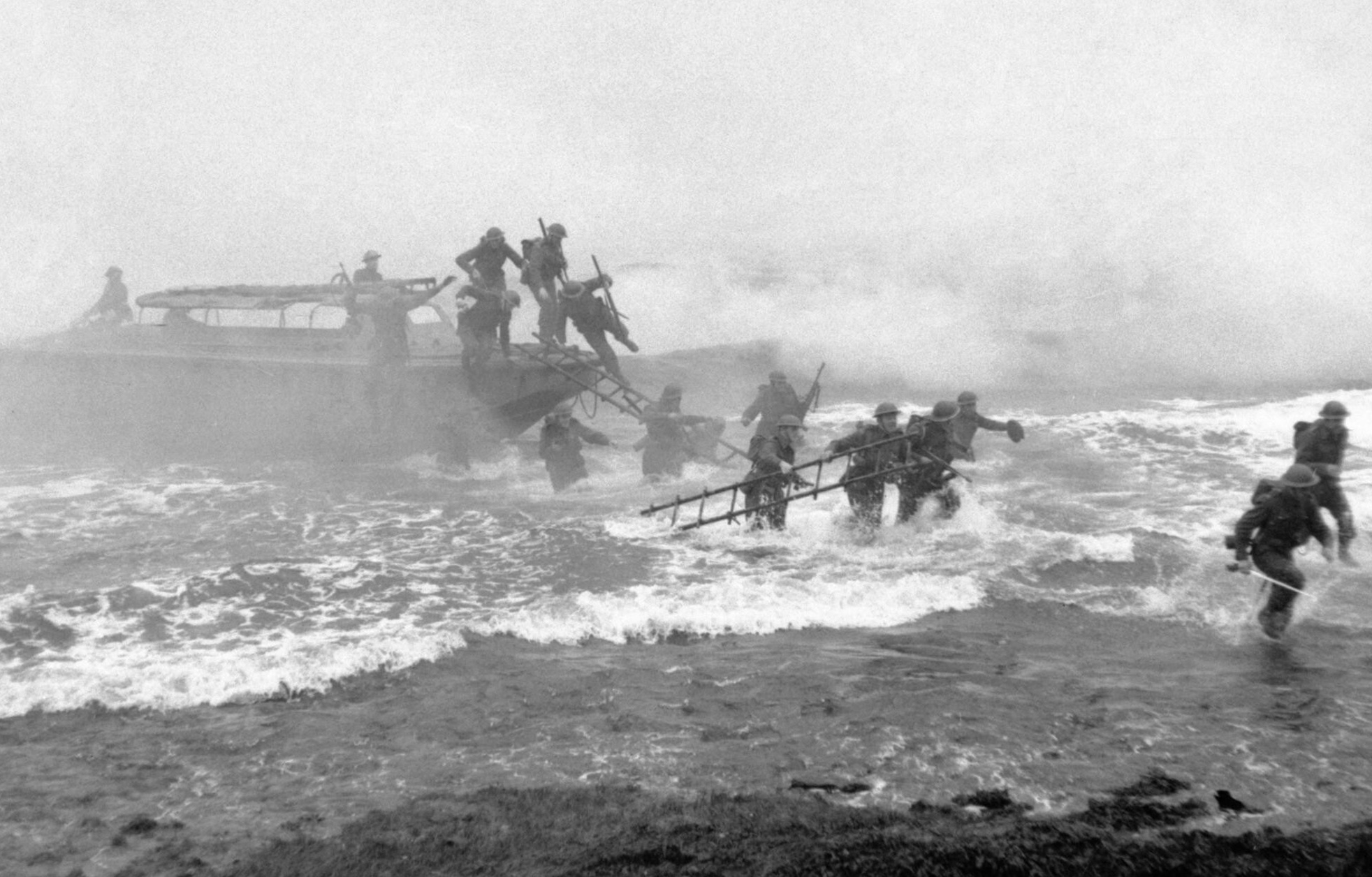
Jack Churchill (far right) leads a training exercise, sword in hand, from a Eureka boat in Inveraray.

In July 1943, as commanding officer, he led No. 2 Commando from their landing site at Catania, in Sicily, with his trademark Scottish broadsword slung around his waist, a longbow and arrows around his neck and his bagpipes under his arm.

Leading 2 Commando, Churchill was ordered to capture a German observation post outside the town of Molina, controlling a pass leading down to the Salerno beachhead. With the help of a corporal, he infiltrated the town, captured the post and took 42 prisoners including a mortar squad. Churchill led the men and prisoners back down the pass, with the wounded being carried on carts pushed by German prisoners. He commented that it was "an image from the Napoleonic Wars". He was appointed a Companion of the Distinguished Service Order for leading that action at Salerno.

Churchill later walked back to the town to retrieve his sword, which he had lost in hand-to-hand combat with the German regiment. On his way there, he encountered a disoriented American patrol mistakenly walking towards enemy lines. When the NCO in command of the patrol refused to turn around, Churchill told them that he was going his own way and that he would not come back for a "bloody third time".

=== Yugoslavia (1944) ===
As part of Maclean Mission (Macmis), in 1944, he led the Commandos in Yugoslavia to support Josip Broz Tito's Partisans from the Adriatic island of Vis. In May he was ordered to raid the German-held island of Brač. He organised a "motley army" of 1,500 Partisans, 43 Commando and one troop from 40 Commando for the raid. The landing was unopposed, but on seeing the gun emplacements from which they later encountered German fire, the Partisans decided to delay the attack until the following day. Churchill's bagpipes signalled the remaining Commandos to battle. After being strafed by an RAF Spitfire, Churchill decided to withdraw for the night and to relaunch the attack the following morning.

==== Capture ====
The following morning, a flanking attack was launched by 43 Commando with Churchill leading the elements from 40 Commando. The Partisans remained at the landing area. Only Churchill and six others managed to reach the objective. A mortar shell killed or wounded everyone but Churchill, who was playing "Will Ye No Come Back Again?" on his pipes as the Germans advanced. He was knocked unconscious by grenades and captured. Believing that he might be related to Winston Churchill (which he was not), German military intelligence had Churchill flown to Berlin for interrogation.

In late April 1945, Churchill and about 140 other prominent concentration camp inmates were transferred to Tyrol and guarded by SS troops. A delegation of prisoners told senior German army officers that they feared they would be executed. A German army unit commanded by Captain Wichard von Alvensleben moved in to protect the prisoners. Outnumbered, the SS guards moved out and left the prisoners behind.

== Postwar ==
=== Palestine ===
In 1948, Churchill was posted to British Palestine. He helped defend a train convoy against 250 men with just 12, and later helped coordinate the evacuation from Hadassah Hospital in Jerusalem.

=== Retirement ===
In retirement, he enjoyed sailing coal-fired ships on the Thames between Richmond and Oxford, as well as making radio-controlled model warships.

== Death ==
Churchill died on 8 March 1996 at 89 years old, in the county of Surrey.

In March 2014, the Royal Norwegian Explorers Club published a book that featured Churchill, naming him as one of the finest explorers and adventurers of all time.

== Family ==
Churchill married Rosamund Margaret Denny (1917-2007), the daughter of Sir Maurice Edward Denny and granddaughter of Sir Archibald Denny, on 8 March 1941. They had two children, Malcolm John Leslie Churchill, born 1942, and Rodney Alistair Gladstone Churchill, born 1947.

== See also ==
- Bill Millin – Bagpiper during World War II
- Digby Tatham-Warter – British Army officer (1917-1993)
- Alfred Wintle – Recipient of the Military Cross
- Adrian Carton de Wiart – Another British soldier noted for eccentricity
