= Georg Thomas =

German general (1890–1946)

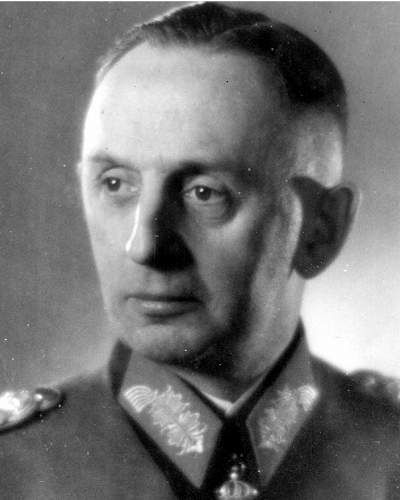
- Born: 20 February 1890; Forst (Lausitz), Brandenburg
- Died: 29 December 1946 (aged 56); Frankfurt, Allied-occupied Germany
- Military career
- Allegiance: German Empire; Weimar Republic; Nazi Germany
- Branch: German Army
- Rank: General der Infanterie
- Commands: Head of the Defence Economy and Armament Office in the Oberkommando der Wehrmacht
- Conflicts: World War I World War II
- Other work: Chief economic strategist for the Wehrmacht. Deeply involved in the development of the strategy for economic exploitation of the Soviet Union following the German invasion, including the Hunger Plan.

Georg Thomas (20 February 1890 – 29 December 1946) was a German general who served during World War II. He was a leading participant in planning and carrying out economic exploitation of the Soviet Union, most notably the Hunger Plan. Thomas's role in plotting against Hitler has led some historians to describe him as a member of the German resistance, while others find his record more ambiguous.

== Career summary ==
Thomas was born in Forst (Lausitz), Brandenburg. Thomas joined Infantry Regiment 63 as an ensign and a career soldier in 1908. From 1928, he dealt with armament questions at the Waffenamt (Army Weapons Office) in the Reich Defence Ministry in Berlin. From 1928 to 1938, Thomas worked as the Chief of Staff for the Army Weapons Office in the Reich Defence Ministry, where he studied national economics and war preparations, pushing forward the idea of a "defense economy", the accumulation of Germany's resources for the purpose of war under a central planning commission.

Despite his misgivings about National Socialism following the dismissal of Colonel General Baron Werner von Fritsch on trumped-up allegations of homosexuality in the Blomberg-Fritsch Affair, Thomas remained an important member of the German General Staff. During Fritsch's removal in 1938 Thomas experienced his first inner conflict with National Socialism. It is speculated he did not resign to foment plans for a coup. In 1939, he became head of the Defence Economy and Armament Office in Oberkommando der Wehrmacht (OKW, high command of the armed forces). He was a member of the board of Kontinentale Öl AG (an oil company whose purpose was to exploit petroleum resources in occupied countries) as well as Reichswerke Hermann Göring, an iron and steel company.

Thomas, who was promoted in 1940 to General of Infantry, recognized early on that Germany's ability to wage a lengthy war was limited by the state of its economy. With the threat of war with the western powers arising over Hitler's bold political moves to secure the Austrian Anschluß, the acquisition of the Sudetenland, and then with the impending attack on Poland awaiting the German General Staff, Thomas produced an extensive report for Hitler assessing the risks. Thomas' analysis was replete with graphics and statistics demonstrating the military–economic superiority of the western powers, at which Hitler balked and exclaimed that "he did not share General Thomas' anxiety over the danger of a world war, especially since he had now got the Soviet Union on his side" (consequent of the Molotov–Ribbentrop Pact). Thomas worried about an attack provoking the British and French, as were generals Walther von Brauchitsch, Colonel-General Halder and the Quartermaster General von Stülpnagel, yet Hitler refused to countenance delay or accept reluctance from his military staff about his plans as Fuhrer and more earnestly pushed forward the arguments for an attack, despite the collective arguments otherwise by Hitler's generals.

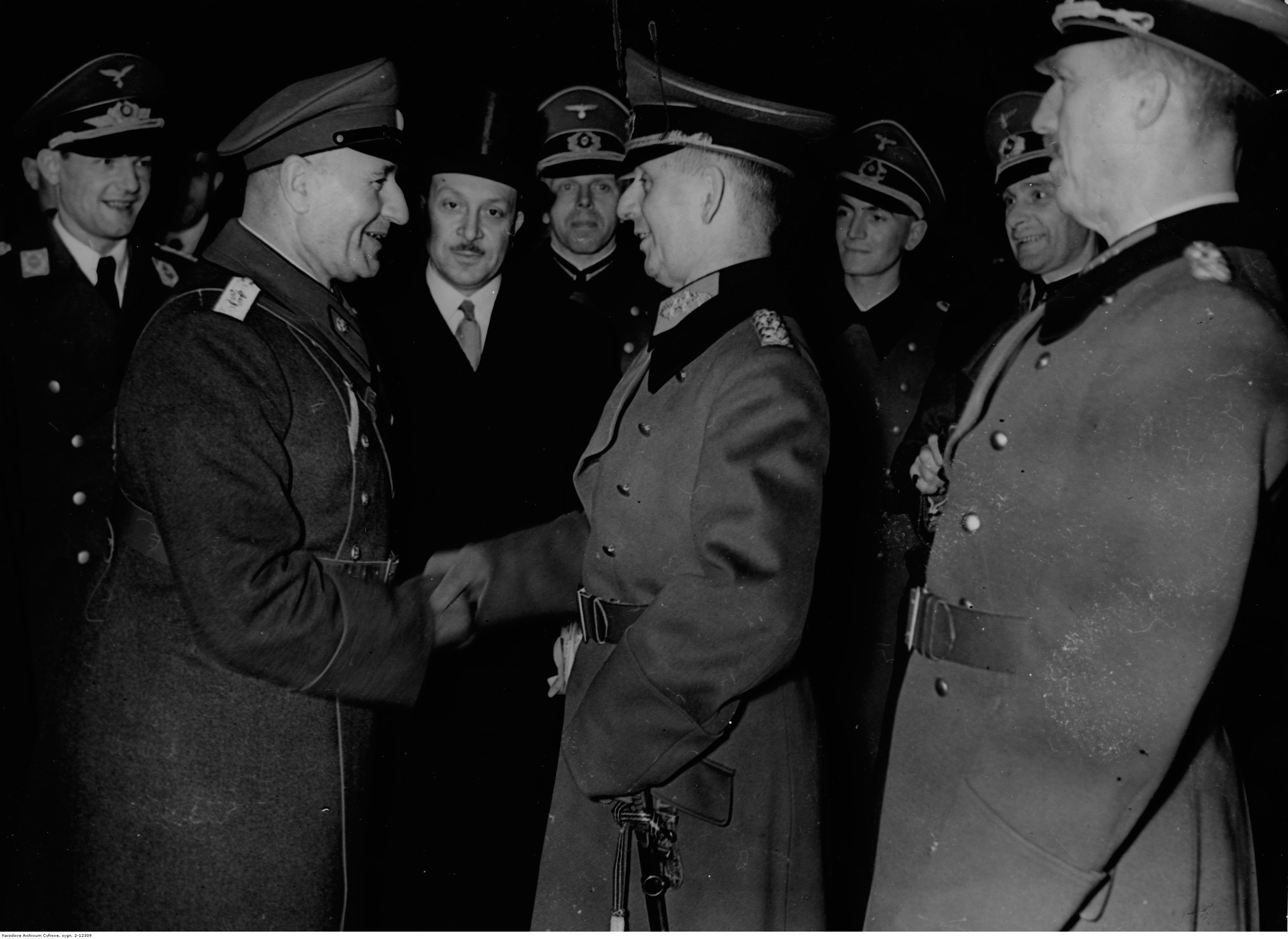
Georg Thomas (center) saying goodbye to Nikola Mikhov

During the planning of Barbarossa (the invasion of Russia), General Thomas' pragmatic and realistic nature once again gripped him. Thomas thought a full-scale war with the Soviet Union should be delayed until the logistical concerns were remedied. He informed Colonel-General Franz Halder, the Chief of the OKH General Staff, that the attack on the Soviet Union would experience logistical delays due to the fact that Russian railways were of a different gauge than German ones. Thomas also warned Halder of the insufficiency of German transport vehicle tires for the task ahead of them, and most significantly, Thomas revealed to Halder that the Germans only had two months' worth of fuel oil and petrol for the invasion. Inexplicably, Halder did not convey this information to Hitler and when Thomas tried to, Field Marshal Wilhelm Keitel suppressed the report. Reassurances soon made their way to General Thomas when the Reichsminister, Hermann Göring, told him not to worry about using Germany's resources since "they would soon be masters of France, Belgium, and the Netherlands", adding that they would plunder resources in the "captured territories".

In November 1942, Thomas resigned from the Defence Economy and Armament Office. Albert Speer and his Armament Ministry had taken over almost all the expertise relating to armament policy. Of note, during the autumn of 1943, Hitler asked for a forecast of what the Germans might expect in the near future. The Chief of the Operations Staff for the OKW, Colonel-General Alfred Jodl, submitted the report to Hitler but he became irate when the estimates were given to him, mentioning Thomas, who "rated the Soviet war potential as high". Hitler forbade war studies by the OKW. Apparently Thomas tried several times to bring the German General Staff and Hitler back to reality. Thomas's pragmatism might have contributed to his disillusion with the regime, perhaps leading him to believe that a coup was necessary to stop Germany from being annihilated.

== Resistance to Hitler ==
Through contacts with his former superior Ludwig Beck, plus Carl Friedrich Goerdeler and Johannes Popitz, he got to work as early as 1938–1939 on the planning for a military coup d'état against Adolf Hitler. After the failure of the attempt on Hitler's life in the 20 July Plot at the Wolf's Lair in East Prussia on 20 July 1944, the coup plans from 1938–1939 were found, leading to Thomas's arrest on 11 October 1944. He was transferred to the Flossenbürg and Dachau concentration camps. In late April 1945, he was transferred to Tyrol together with about 140 other prominent inmates. On 30 April, after US troops and soldiers from Wichard von Alvensleben's unit had surrounded the village, the SS guards decided to escape. Thomas and the other prisoners were liberated by the Fifth U.S. Army on 5 May 1945. He was freed, and moved to Frankfurt am Main but imprisonment had broken his health and he died on 29 December 1946.

== Role in Hunger Plan ==
Thomas has been described as someone who at times "toyed with opposition to Hitler's war" but who fundamentally was a "ruthless pragmatist" whose only concern was "Germany's future as a great power". He was deeply involved in the making of Nazi policy for the occupied Soviet Union, which was to exploit the resources of the country for the benefit of Germany and the German armed forces, at the expense of the deaths by starvation of millions of people. This became known as the Hunger Plan. Thomas worked closely with Herbert Backe, the de facto chief of Nazi agriculture, in developing this plan. On 2 May 1941, Thomas held a meeting to review the strategy. An internal Wehrmacht memorandum prepared by his staff described this policy and acknowledged that "if we take what we need out of the country, there can be no doubt that many millions of people will die of starvation". This memorandum has been described as,

...one of the most extraordinary bureaucratic records in the history of the Nazi regime. In far more unvarnished language than was ever used in relation to the Jewish question, all of the major agencies of the German state agreed to a programme of mass murder, which dwarfed that which Heydrich was to propose to the Wannsee meeting nine months later.

The historian, Christopher Browning, wrote that on 2 May 1941, the state secretaries of various ministries met with Thomas and agreed to make it a priority to supply the army with food from Russia and to ship other essential agricultural products, including grain, to Germany. "In doing so" Thomas's protocol laconically stated, "umpteen million people will doubtless starve to death, if we extract everything necessary for us from the country". While the memorandum did not estimate how many millions would die, Backe stated that the "surplus population" of the Soviet Union was 20 to 30 million. German policy for the invasion, and instructions to the troops, were deliberately calculated either to kill these 20 to 30 million through starvation or force them to flee to Siberia.
