= General Churchill =

General Churchill may refer to:

- Charles Churchill (British Army officer, born 1656) (1656–1714), British Army general
- Charles Churchill (British Army officer, born 1679) (1679–1745), British Army lieutenant general
- George Churchill (British Army officer) (died 1753), British Army lieutenant general
- Horatio Churchill (1759–1817), British Army major general
- John Churchill, 1st Duke of Marlborough (1650–1722), English Army general
- Marlborough Churchill (1878–1947), U.S. Army brigadier general
- Sylvester Churchill (1783–1862), Union Army brevet brigadier general
- T. B. L. Churchill, British Major-General
- Thomas James Churchill (1824–1905), Confederate States Army major general
