= Goerdeler (disambiguation) =

Goerdeler or Gördeler is a German family name. It may refer to:

- Carl Friedrich Goerdeler (1884–1945), mayor of Leipzig and participant in the 20 July plot against Hitler
- Fritz Goerdeler (1886–1945), his younger brother
- Reinhard Goerdeler (1922–1996), Carl Friedrich's son
- 8268 Goerdeler, an asteroid named after Carl Friedrich
