= Hans-Hasso von Veltheim =

German Indologist, Anthroposophist, Far East traveler, occultist and author

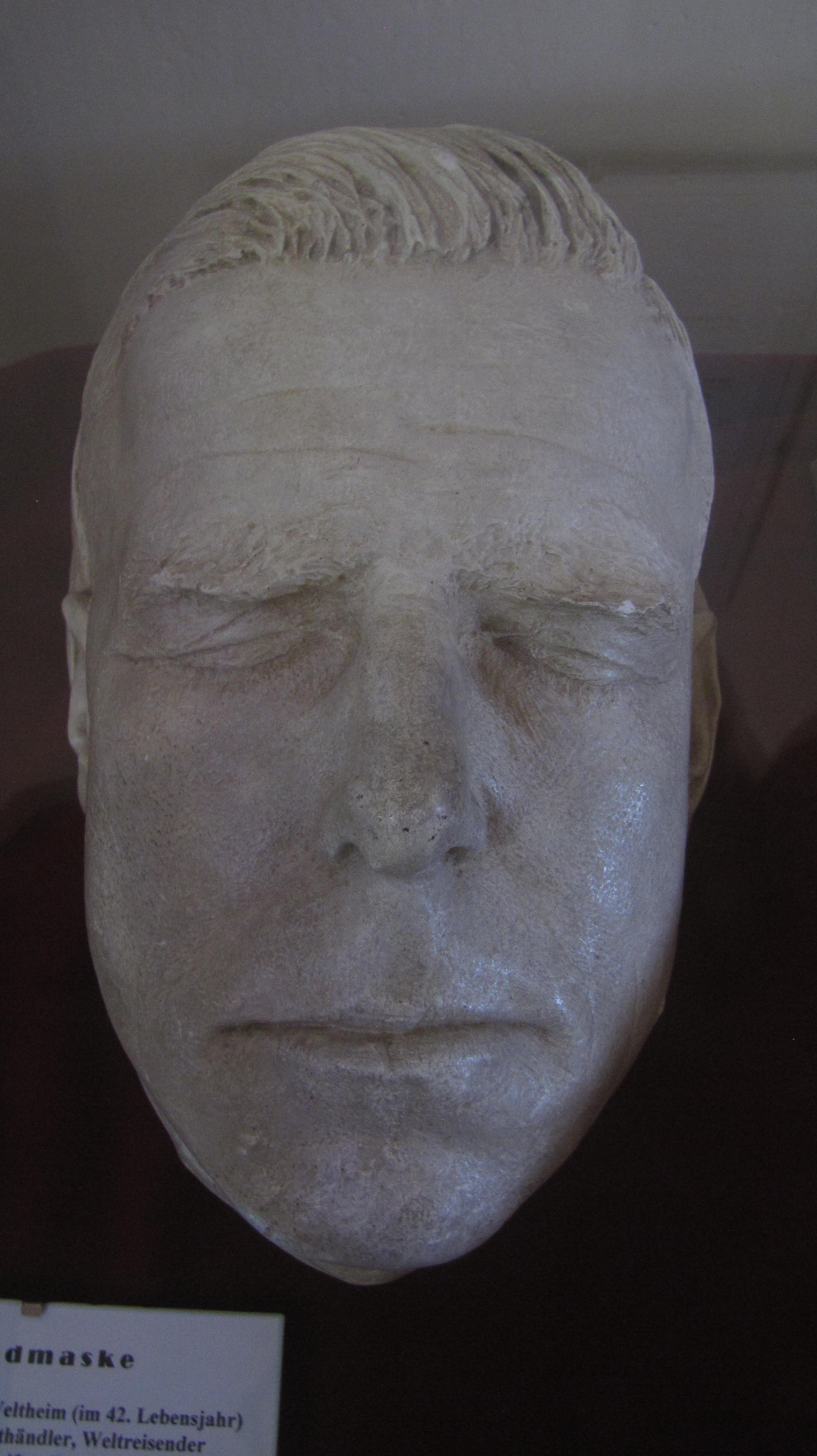
Hans-Hasso von Veltheim, live mask (1927)

Hans-Hasso Ludolf Martin von Veltheim-Ostrau (born Cologne October 15, 1885, died Utersum August 13, 1956) was a German Indologist, Anthroposophist, Far East traveler, occultist and author.

== Family ==
He came from an old Lower Saxon family of nobility, which was first documented in 1160 at Veltheim in Lower Saxony. He was the son of the royal Prussian lieutenant colonel and landowner Franz von Veltheim (1856–1927), laird of Ostrau and Weissandt and Anhalt ducal chamberlain, and his first wife Klara Herbertz (1860–1925) from Cologne.

Veltheim married 7 October 1916 in Leverkusen Hildegard Duisberg (* November 18, 1893 in Elberfeld, died 1964), daughter of Johanna Seebohm and Carl Duisberg, Director General of IG Farben. The marriage was divorced on 28 January 1924 in Berlin. His daughter Michaela von Busse died on 11 February 1940 as a result of the birth of his grandson, her son Michael.

== Friends ==
Veltheim attracted worldwide friendship networks and his celebrity garnered him many contacts. The philosopher Hermann Graf Keyserling and the Berlin Chief Rabbi Leo Baeck were counted amongst his friends. He devoted himself to Eastern culture, anthroposophy, occultism and spirituality. He was a friend of authors like Hermann Kasack, Hans Henny Jahnn and Grigol Robakidze who wrote books when Veltheim's guest at Ostrau. The artist Alastair was a friend from his early years in Munich whom he supported throughout his life.

Outside Ostrau and on his travels he came into contact with personalities such as Mahatma Gandhi, Aristide Briand, Anthony Eden, Walther Rathenau, Gustav Stresemann, with numerous scientists and artists such as Gerhart Hauptmann, Rainer Maria Rilke, Stefan George, Richard Strauss, Arno Breker and Oswald Spengler. He was a friend of the poet Sir Muhammad Iqbal from their student days in Munich and happened to visit Iqbal the day before Iqbal died, in India.

== Life ==
He studied art history and obtained his Ph D on Burgundische Kleinkirchen bis zum Jahre 1200 (small churches in Burgundy until 1200). During the Eulenburg affair he tried to bring Maximilian Harden to reason with a long conversation in April 1908. Since 1907 his hobby had been ballooning, resulting in his fighting as an airship officer during World War I. He then became a scholar of Rudolf Steiner and was a lifetime follower of his esoteric spiritual movement, anthroposophy. After the war he was first the head of a small publishing house in Munich, then an art and antiques dealer in Berlin. In Munich he came into contact with the influential literary group George-Kreis. The author Alfred Schuler died in his arms in 1923. In 1925 he financially supported the physician Magnus Hirschfeld, an outspoken advocate for sexual minorities, with whom he had been in contact since 1909. He stood up for many of his homosexual artist friends, financially and with moral courage when they were prosecuted.

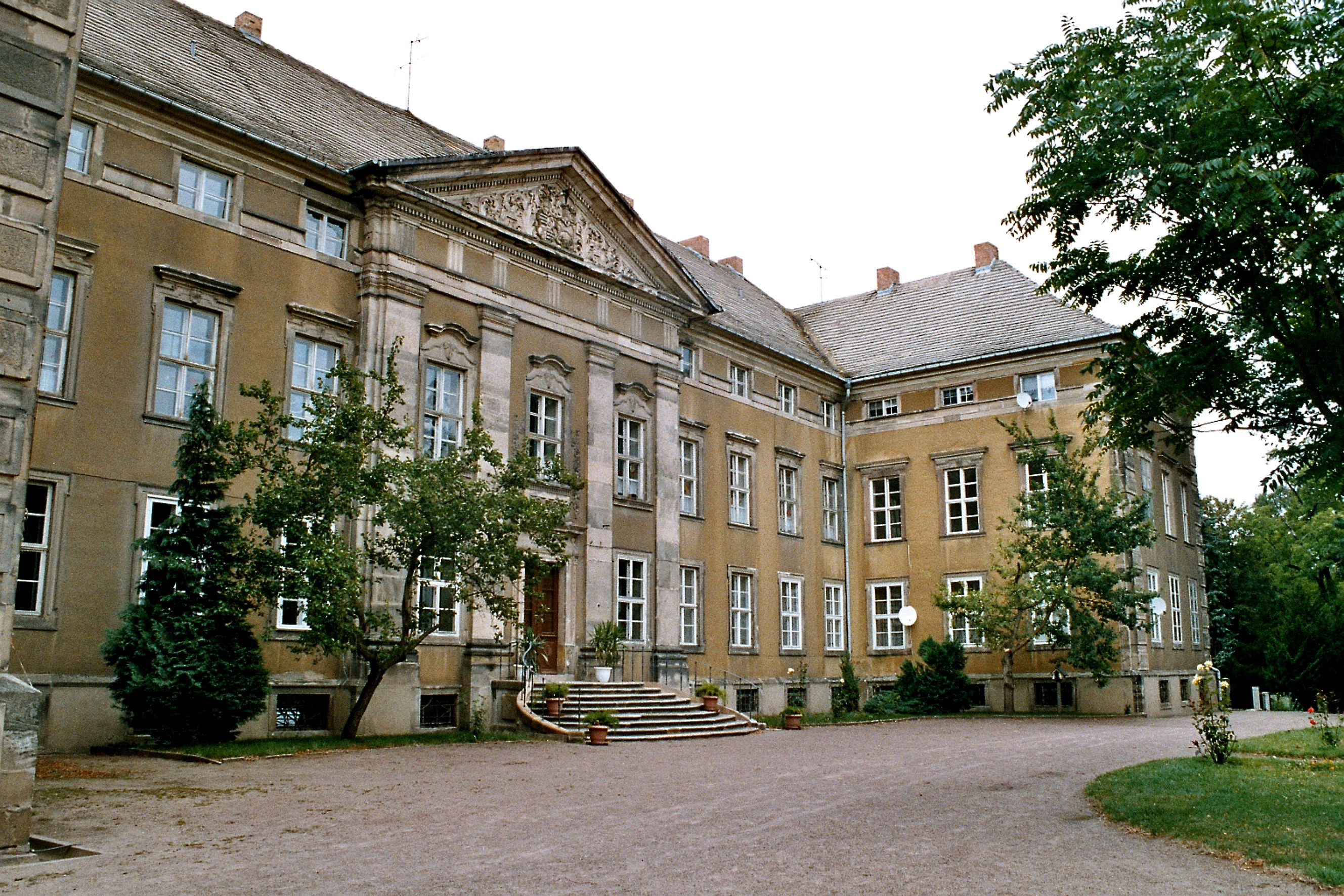
Ostrau Castle

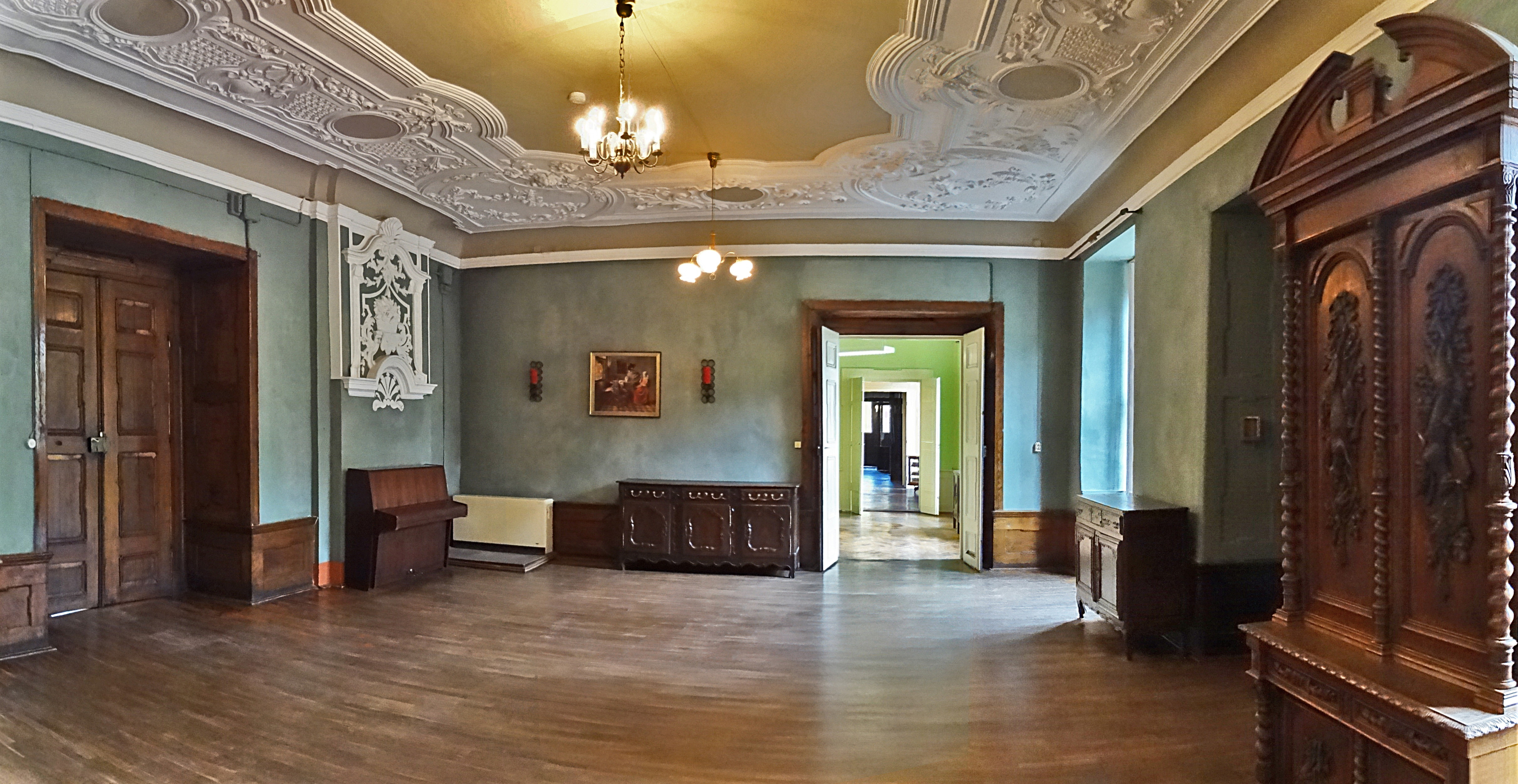
A room at Ostrau

In 1927 he inherited Ostrau Castle and its large agricultural estate near Halle. He had the castle extensively renovated and furnished with his collections of antiques, expressionist paintings (such as Marsden Hartley's Light House) as well as ethnological objects from all over the world. Until the Second World War, he turned his home into a meeting place for scientists, writers, artists, esotericists, politicians, musicians, dancers, and numerous visitors from Asia, especially India. Initially his interests revolved around China, which he was never to set foot in and whose art and philosophy he was taught by the Sinologist Richard Wilhelm, but gradually India came to the fore, especially through theosophical and spiritual contacts. Through Annie Besant who called the gigantic grand-seigneur „my crusader“, he came close to theosophy, especially to the world savior, whom she temporarily postulated, Jiddu Krishnamurti, who stayed in Ostrau for a week in 1931. But he also maintained good contacts with influential politicians of the Weimar Republic, such as the President of the Reichstag Paul Löbe and a number of cabinet ministers, as well as with domestic and foreign diplomats who visited and invited him. The papal nuntius (and later pope Pius XII) Eugenio Pacelli was known to him from his Munich and Berlin times.

After Adolf Hitler's rise to power, numerous members of his circle of friends emigrated from 1933, like the dancers Harald Kreutzberg and Kurt Jooss or the Indologist Heinrich Zimmer and the anthroposophist Eugen Kolisko, others were harassed by the Nazi regime. Nevertheless, he tried to maintain his cosmopolitan intellectual meeting place, which he succeeded in doing thanks to clever private diplomacy and influential contacts. He hosted a synod of the Christian Community in 1935, when it was already threatened by closure. Many of his guests stayed for weeks, sometimes months. During the day people worked, in the evenings there were large discussions or artistic performances. Veltheim had - in addition to high intellect and deep education - the talent to respond intensively to each of his guests and to give them his full attention. Ostrau's charisma as an intellectual meeting point soon extended far beyond Germany. Among his guests were Ambalal Sarabhai, Bijoy Prasad Singh Roy, Ram Nath Chopra and many other Indian visitors.

In spite of foreign exchange controls and travel restrictions, he managed to undertake a number of trips abroad, supported by a friend in the Foreign Department. In order to enable these, as well as to protect his cosmopolitan center, he even joined the NSDAP in 1937. These travels included two trips to London for the World Congress of Faiths organized by Francis Younghusband, to Chicago for the World's Fair Century of Progress, and two trips to Asia. On the first in 1935/36, he met Sivananda Saraswati whose business expansion and personality cult he later criticized. On the second, 1937−39, he travelled to Bombay and Calcutta for a conference of the Indian Science Congress Association, then to Afghanistan (where Shah Mahmud Khan, who had been his guest in Ostrau in 1936, received him like a state guest, as did several Indian courts), further on to Nepal (then almost inaccessible), Burma, British Malaya, the Dutch East Indies, Java, Singapore and Bali (where he visited Walter Spies). The outbreak of World War II prevented his planned onward journey to China, Japan and the USA. He had to return to Germany via Egypt, Libya, Italy, France, Belgium and the Netherlands (where he once again visited the exiled Emperor Wilhelm II, whom his mother had known well).

He had been sending his travel diaries home, where they were duplicated on matrices and sent in 500 to 750 copies to his circle of acquaintances, including the Foreign Office. Upon his return, he set about revising and looking for book publication opportunities. The war hindered this project as well as the continuation of his conference activities. He spent the war years on his estate, only visited by a few friends, but was always well informed about the war situation through foreign broadcasters and contacts with soldiers at the front. He provided spiritual support to his cousin Elisabeth von Thadden in letters before she was executed as a resistance fighter against the Nazi régime in September 1944, as was his close friend Carl Wentzel.

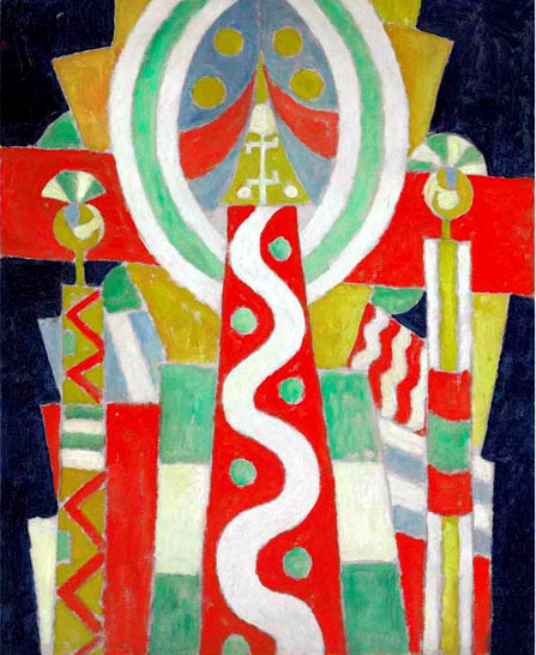
Marsden Hartley: Light House (1915), from Veltheim's collection

After the Second World War, the American occupying forces immediately took Veltheim's advice to administer the region. In June 1945, he traveled with Erhard Hübener to US headquarters in Frankfurt am Main, where Hübener was appointed governor of the province of Saxony by General Dwight D. Eisenhower. There, however, they also received certainty that parts of Central Germany would be surrendered to the Soviet occupation zone of Germany, which was planned for July. Nevertheless, Veltheim refused to flee, which had been recommended to him on many occasions, and stayed. At first the Soviets provided him with guards of honor, like the Americans before them, as a result of sovereign private diplomacy, such as Veltheim had used against National Socialism. The authorities in the Soviet occupation zone, who were not yet fully aligned with the communist party, initially employed Veltheim as trustee and manager of his palace and park; they even offered him a professorship at the University of Halle; his refusal to accept made it impossible for him to stay and he fled to the British Zone of Allied-occupied Germany in November 1945. His castle was plundered and the land confiscated.

Hans-Hasso von Veltheim was cared for in the West by his ex-wife and friends from home and abroad. For years he stayed with different hosts who had once been his guests. A special relationship existed with Leo Baeck, the Jewish rabbi, scholar, and theologian whom he had known since 1923 and who came to Ostrau several times after 1933. Despite the strictest ban, Veltheim continued to visit the president of the umbrella organization of German Jews in Berlin until the end of 1942 and had food delivered to him until his deportation in January 1943. Baeck, in turn, sent him the newly created manuscript chapters of his work “This People Israel: the Meaning of Jewish Existence” to keep them safe. Before he fled in 1945, Veltheim handed it over to a state curator. After Baeck had miraculously survived the end of the war in a concentration camp and was able to emigrate to England and the US, they resumed their correspondence and now Baeck in return supported the refugee Veltheim financially.

From 1948 he worked on new manuscripts based on the reports sent and his memories, since his notes and film recordings were left (and lost) in Ostrau. The travel diaries, first published by Greven-Verlag in Cologne and then by Claassen-Verlag from 1951, received a great deal of attention in the press and were a sales success. His reports are written in a clear, understandable way, but they differ from many other travel reports by profound knowledge and deep empathy for the spirituality of the Orient. Spiritual leaders had discovered qualities in Veltheim that they usually looked for in vain in white people: unusual empathy, a certain mental training, sense of the occult, familiarity with meditation, the ability to recognize the aura of people and places and to face it with reverence. In their eyes, no one had absorbed as much enlightened Asia as he had.

Suffering severely from asthma, he died in 1956. His friend Udo von Alvensleben wrote: "Living in exile as a sannyasin, a propertyless pilgrim to the Absolute, seemed like an Asian finale. To be sure, he remained a European in that the problem confusion of our world continued to trouble his heart while his spirit carried out the final clarification." His urn was brought back to Ostrau in 1990, after the fall of the Berlin Wall, and buried in a crypt chapel in the Castle Church, which he had converted into an anthroposophical meditation room in 1933.

== Works ==
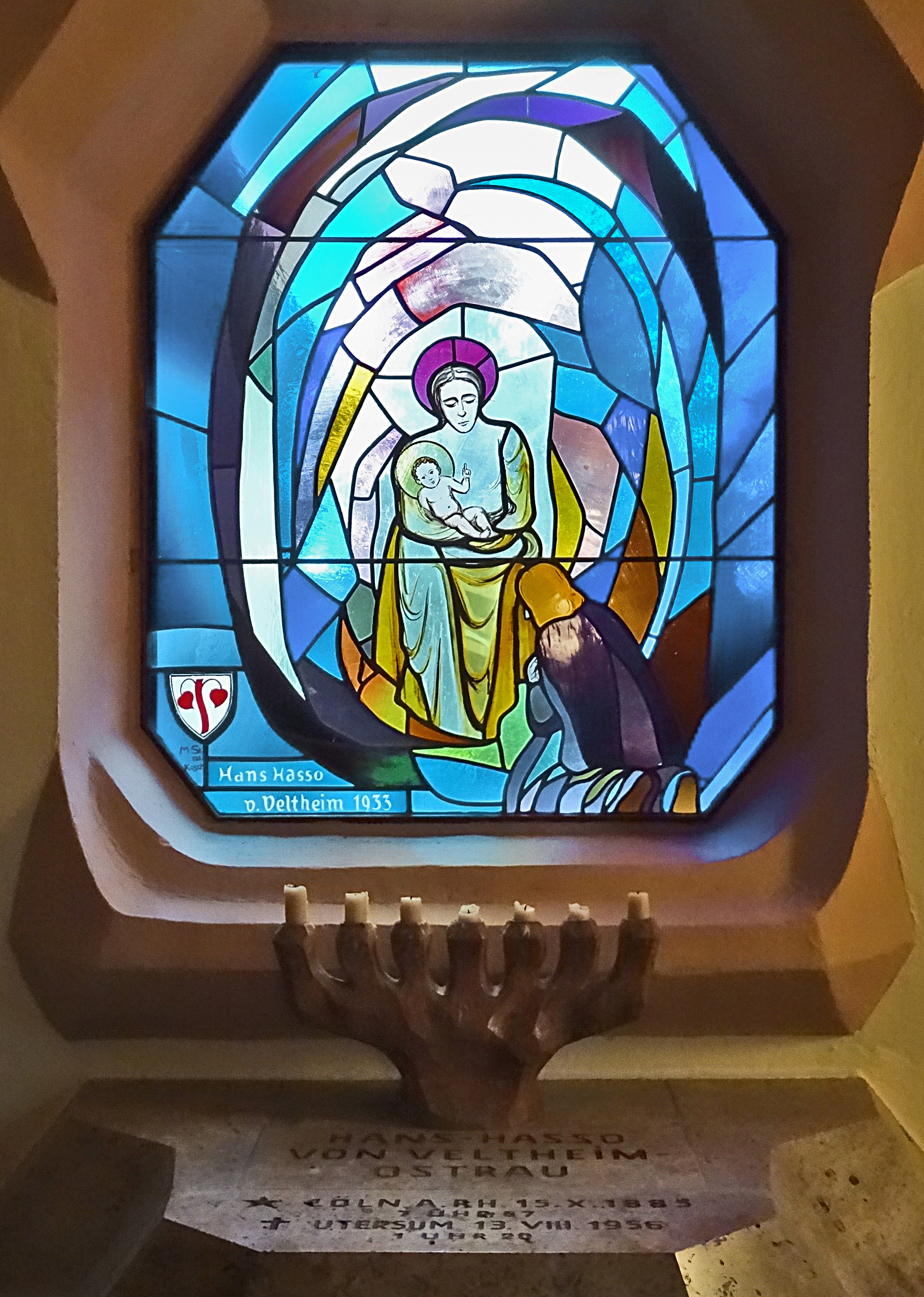
Grave altar of Hans-Hasso von Veltheim in his burial chapel at Ostrau, the window created by Maria Strakosch-Giesler, Kandinsky's art student, in 1933

- Small Burgundian churches until the year 1200th Diss 1912
- Diaries from Asia. Bali. Berlin: Suhrkamp 1943
- Diaries from Asia. First part: Bombay, Calcutta, Kashmir, Afghanistan, the Himalayas, Nepal, Benares. 1935–1939. Greeve: Cologne 1952
- The breath of India. Diaries from Asia. New Episode: Ceylon and southern India. Hamburg: Claasen 1954
- Gods and people between India and China. Diaries from Asia. Part Three: Burma, Thailand, Cambodia, Malaya, Java and Bali. Hamburg: *Claasen 1958 (posthumously)
- What we look [,] we will be. Aphorisms. Frankfurt aM: Atharva-Verlag 1956
