= Ludolf Jakob von Alvensleben =

SS and Police Leader and SS-Standartenführer

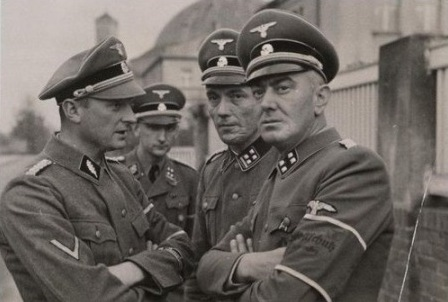
- Volksdeutscher Selbstschutz leaders in Bydgoszcz: SS-Standartenführer Ludolf Jakob von Alvensleben, SS-Obersturmbannführer Erich Spaarmann, SS-Obersturmbannführer Dr. Hans Kölzow and SS-Sturmbannführer Christian Schnug
- Born: 9 August 1899; Wittenmoor, Province of Saxony, Kingdom of Prussia, German Empire
- Died: 23 August 1953 (age 54); Dortmund, North Rhine-Westphalia, West Germany
- Military career
- Allegiance: German Empire; Nazi Germany
- Branch: Imperial German Army; Schutzstaffel; Waffen-SS
- Service years: 1916–1919; 1932–1945
- Rank: Leutnant; SS-Standartenführer; SS-Sturmbannführer (Waffen-SS)
- Nickname: Ludi
- Commands: SS and Police Leader, "Friaul;"; Adriatisches West
- Conflicts: World War I World War II
- Awards: Iron Cross, 2nd class Clasp to the Iron Cross, 2nd class War Merit Cross, 2nd class with Swords

Ludolf Jakob von Alvensleben (9 August 1899 – 23 August 1953) was a German SS-Standartenführer who during the Second World War served as a senior staff member of Operation Reinhard, by which Reichsführer-SS Heinrich Himmler planned to systematically murder the Jews of Europe. Alvensleben ended the war as the SS and Police Leader (SSPF) for Adria-West in Northern Italy/South Tyrol. He avoided prosecution after the war, but died in an automobile accident in 1953.

== Family ==
Ludolf "Ludi" Jakob von Alvensleben was a member of the House of Alvensleben, one of the oldest German aristocratic families. He was born in Wittenmoor, then in the Prussian Province of Saxony, the third of the four sons of Ludolf Udo von Alvensleben (de) (1852–1923). His oldest brother, Busso, died in 1918, in the First World War. His remaining older brother Udo (1897–1962) was a famed art historian and diarist.

His younger brother Wichard (1902–1982) and their cousin, Hauptmann Gebhard von Alvensleben, were Wehrmacht officers who helped rescue 139 prominent hostages from members of the SS, who had escorted their truck convoy from Dachau concentration camp to Niederdorf in South Tyrol, during the last days of the Second World War. The prominent hostages, who had been gathered from various camps and prisons throughout Germany included Werner von Alvensleben, who remained at the Flossenbürg concentration camp when his convoy stopped there on the way to Dachau. The other hostages were transported to the Dachau concentration camp before being collectively sent on to South Tyrol. As SS and Police Leader (SSPF) for Adria-West, Ludolf Jakob von Alvensleben was the most senior SS and SD Officer active in the area at the time.

== Early life ==
Like his two older brothers, Ludolf Jakob von Alvensleben attended school at the Knights Academy (de) in Brandenburg an der Havel until he volunteered for service in the First World War, joining the 10th (Magdeburg) Hussars, headquartered in Stendal. He was awarded the Iron Cross 2nd class, was discharged as a 19-year-old Leutnant of reserves and was then active in a Freikorps company. He next took over the management of the family estate, which he received as an inheritance from his father, in Plutowo, Kreis Kulm, in West Prussia. As a consequence of the German territorial losses mandated by the Treaty of Versailles, Alvensleben became one of a large number of Junkers who lost their lands to the new Polish state. He was compensated by the Weimar Republic, however, he lost this compensation in the hyperinflation that was rampant in Germany in the early 1920s. He was also involved in a Ford auto franchise in Danzig (today, Gdańsk) that went bankrupt in the Great Depression.

Financially ruined, Alvensleben returned to Saxony, became a member of the SS (SS member number 52,195) in June 1932 and joined the Nazi Party (membership number 1,313,391) in September of that year. He was assigned to the staff of SS-Abschnitt (District) VII, based in Königsberg, and was commissioned an SS-Untersturmführer on 9 November 1933. He rose rapidly through the ranks and served as an adjutant to the Reichssportführer, SA-Gruppenführer Hans von Tschammer und Osten. He was also assigned to the staff of the Reichsführer-SS from 1935 to 1936 and the SS Main Office from 1936 to 1939. His formal posting from 1939 to 1943 was with the SS Personnel Main Office. On the fifth anniversary of the Nazi seizure of power, Alvensleben was promoted to his highest rank, SS-Standartenführer.

== Second World War ==
=== Poland and Russia ===
Following the invasion of Poland in September 1939, Alvensleben's familial connections to Reichsführer-SS Himmler's Personal Adjutant, SS-Oberführer Ludolf-Hermann von Alvensleben, resulted in his being assigned as Inspektionsführer in Danzig-West Prussia for the Volksdeutscher Selbstschutz, an ethnic German paramilitary unit. He reported directly to his namesake and Volksdeutscher Selbstschutz commander, Ludolf-Hermann. The similar name, Selbstschutz involvement, shared fanaticism and areas of murderous activity, has resulted in the identities of both men at times being confounded by historians. Alvensleben established his headquarters on his dispossessed estate in Plutowo and exacted revenge. The cellars of the estate house became the scene for torture and murder of hundreds of Jews and ethnic Poles.

By the end of October 1939, many of the younger members of the Volksdeutscher Selbstschutz in Danzig-West Prussia were incorporated into the Ordnungspolizei, Sicherheitsdienst (SD) or Wehrmacht. They were given new duties as ethnic cleansers with the Reichskommissar fur die Festigung des Deutschen Volkstums (RKFDV) and its affiliate organizations in an operation that became known as Intelligenzaktion Pommern. Alvensleben was next sent to Lublin District to serve under the SS and Police Leader, Oberführer Odilo Globočnik. His responsibilities included the organization and training of the Volksdeutscher Selbstschutz in and around Lublin. He was later involved in the training of both the Sonderdienst and the Trawniki guards. In February 1940, he also became head of the Lublin-Lipowa camp. Between October 1939 and the spring and the summer of 1940, Alvensleben made use of his Volksdeutscher Selbstschutz auxiliaries to play a significant part in the massacre of the Polish intelligentsia in West Prussia and later in Lublin and Warsaw. This became known as the AB-Aktion. In April 1940, von Alvensleben commanded the Selbstschutz during the massacre of more than 160 Polish civilians at Jozefow in the Lublin District. In June 1940, a further massacre of 27 civilians was carried out at Radawiec under his orders.

He was ordered to the Waffen-SS in 1942 where he served as a police Fachführer (specialist officer) and attained the rank of Sturmbannführer. During his war service, he was awarded the Clasp to the Iron Cross and the War Merit Cross, 2nd class. On 1 November 1942 he was assigned to police duties under the Higher SS and Police Leader (HSSPF) Russland Süd (Southern Russia), SS-Obergruppenführer Hans-Adolf Prützmann. He was, apart from his other duties, active in this posting until his transfer to Italy in May 1944.

=== Italy ===
Following the armistice between Fascist Italy and the Allies, SS-Gruppenführer Globočnik on 13 September 1943 was appointed the HSSPF of the newly established Operational Zone of the Adriatic Littoral, with headquarters in Trieste. Globočnik brought along many of his trusted staff from Operation Reinhard, including Alvensleben, who served on his staff from 11 May 1944 and who, on 27 October 1944, was appointed SS and Polizeikommandeur (Police Area Commander) for "Friaul" with his seat at Udine. On 10 April 1945, he was given the title of SS and Police Leader (SSPF) Adria-West (Western Adriatic) which he held until the surrender of the German forces in Italy.

== Postwar years and death ==
Alvensleben escaped investigation and prosecution after the war and is reported to have died when his car overturned on a road outside Dortmund, in August 1953. There were no witnesses to the accident. The police chief at the time of the discovery, and of identification of the corpse, had served under Alvensleben in southern Russia during the war.

== SS ranks ==
SS ranks
Rank	Date
SS-Untersturmführer	9 November 1933
SS-Obersturmführer	9 March 1934
SS-Hauptsturmführer	9 November 1934
SS-Sturmbannführer	30 January 1936
SS-Obersturmbannführer	1 January 1937
SS-Standartenführer	30 January 1938
