= Hans-Günter Richardi =

German author and journalist (1939–2025)

Hans-Günter Richardi (26 October 1939 – 25 April 2025) was a German author and journalist, residing in Dachau.

== Life and career ==
Richardi, a long-time editor of the Süddeutsche Zeitung, was very engaged in his books on the history of Nazism. For his research, the author received several awards. He was a recipient of the Order of Merit of the International Dachau Committee and the Public Service Medal of the city of Dachau, and an honor and board member of the International committee of Dachau. The first Dachau guide was written by him.

Another one of Richardi's intensively researched topics was the Transport of concentration camp inmates to Tyrol at the hands of the SS in South Tyrol on 30 April 1945. He co-founded the contemporary Braies history archive at the Hotel Braies, where the odyssey of prominent prisoners ended.

Richardi died on 25 April 2025, at the age of 85.
