= Udo von Alvensleben =

German art historian

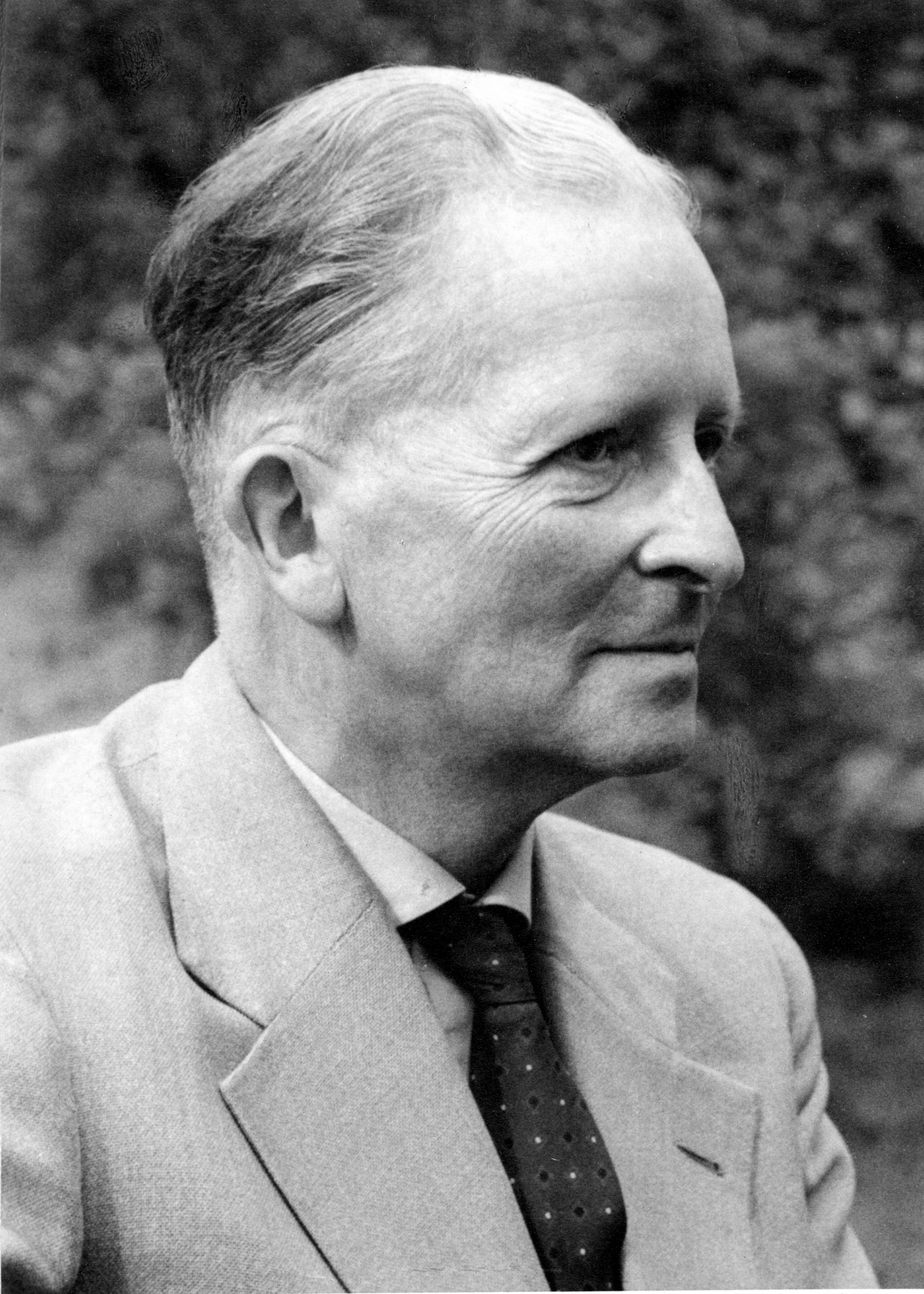
Udo von Alvensleben, c. 1955

Udo August Ernst von Alvensleben (23 January 1897 – 22 August 1962) was a German art historian.

== Family ==
Born in Wittenmoor, Alvensleben descended from the old noble House of Alvensleben of the Margraviate of Brandenburg and was the eldest son of the landowner, Prussian chamberlain, member of the Prussian House of Lords and district deputy Ludolf Udo von Alvensleben (1852–1923), laird of Wittenmoor, Sichau-Tarnefitz and Plutowo, and of Ida von Alvensleben, née von Glasenapp (1866–1924). His youngest brother was the officer Wichard von Alvensleben (1902–1982), who became known through the liberation of prominent SS hostages in late April 1945. His middle brother Ludolf Jakob von Alvensleben was a SS and police leader in Italy.

In 1944, Alvensleben married baroness Elma zu Innhausen und Knyphausen (1919–2004) of Bodelschwingh Castle at Dortmund. This marriage produced three children, including the ambassador Busso von Alvensleben (b. 1949).

== Education ==
In 1914, Alvensleben graduated from the Ritterakademie (knight's academy) of St. Peter and Paul Cathedral in Brandenburg. From the First World War, during which he was mainly deployed in Northern France and Flanders, he returned as a first lieutenant. From 1919, he studied agriculture and forestry, history, art history and philosophy in Munich. Besides he took drawing, etching and lithography lessons.

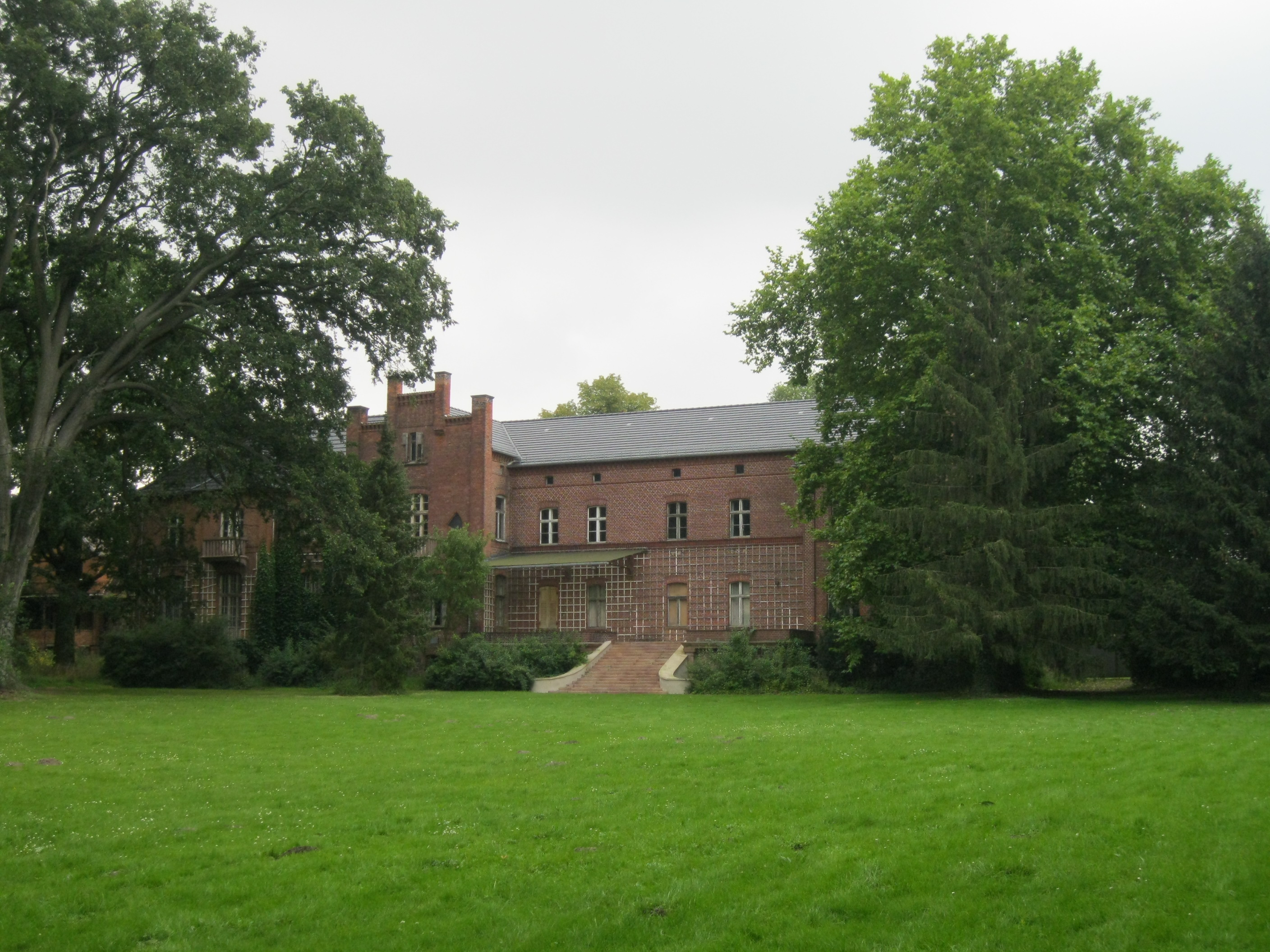
Manor House at Wittenmoor, Altmark

In 1920, Alvensleben took over the management of the Wittenmoor estate and continued his studies in Berlin, which he expanded to include law, economics, diplomacy and archaeology. Diary entries show the man who was influenced by war experiences as an intellectual and spiritual seeker; in 1926 he visited Romain Rolland in Villeneuve on Lake Geneva. In 1926, he went to Hamburg and in 1927 he received his doctorate under the art historian Erwin Panofsky as Dr. phil. His dissertation on the Great Garden of the Herrenhausen Gardens of Hanover was published by Deutscher Kunstverlag and provided the inspiration for its reconstruction from 1936, in which he participated in an advisory capacity.

This was followed by travels in Europe, especially repeatedly to France, which influenced him throughout his life in his preference for the Baroque, and world travels, which took him to America and Asia. In 1927–28, he travelled to India together with his cousin, the Indologist Helmuth von Glasenapp. During his stays in China and Japan in 1932–33, he was mainly interested in their philosophy and in the art of the Chinese garden and Japanese garden. Among his friends was Hans-Hasso von Veltheim-Ostrau, who endeavoured to bring Indian teachings to Germany.

== Other activities ==
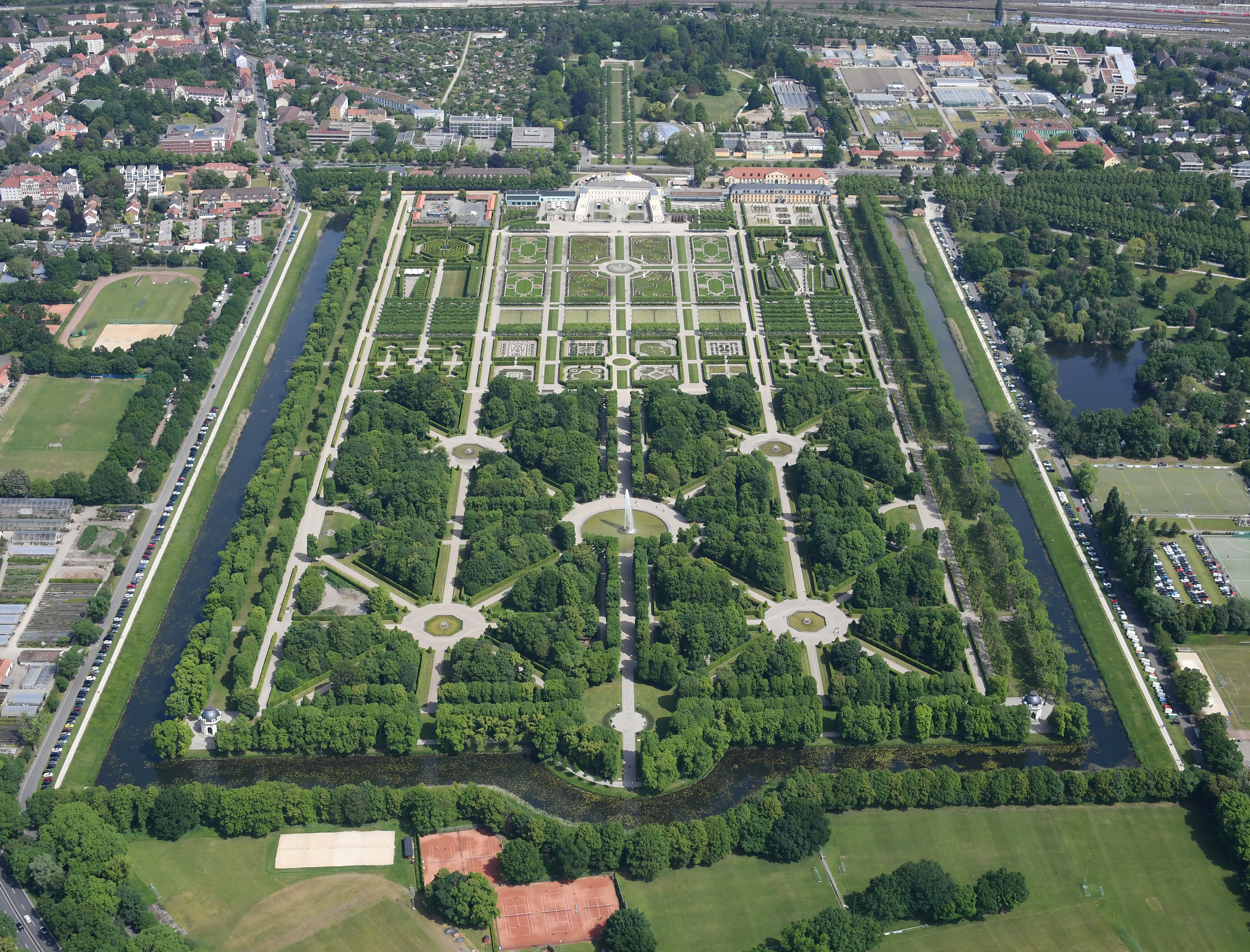
The reconstructed "Großer Garten" (Great Garden) of Herrenhausen Gardens

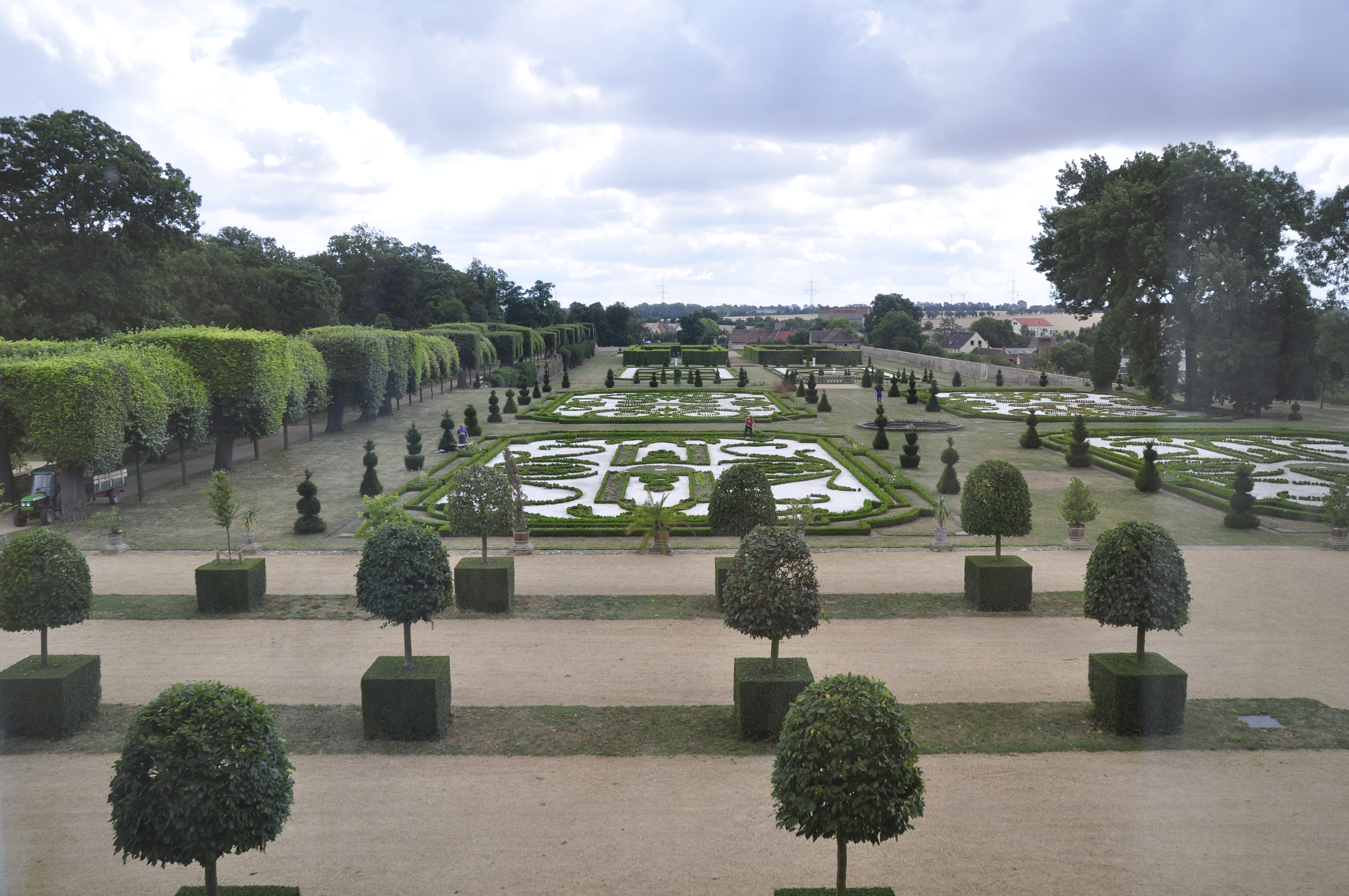
The reconstructed Park of Schloss Hundisburg

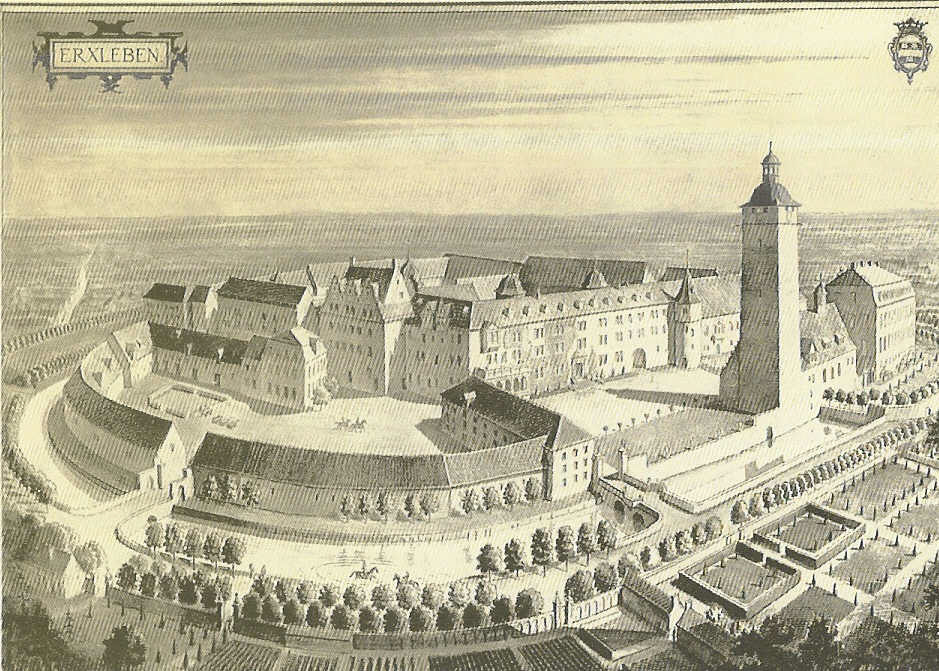
Anco Wigboldus: Bird view of Schloss Erxleben

Like many of his ancestors, Alvensleben based his broad education on the idea that he would be involved in civil service. When the National Socialists came to power, he was forced to turn his attention to more private projects. Through his studies of palaces and gardens of the Baroque era, he became increasingly interested in his family's historical and cultural heritage. He also reconstructed the baroque park of the former Alvensleben Schloss Hundisburg on behalf of the owners. In 1937, he published a book about the architect of Hundisburg, Hermann Korb, and his Brunswick castle buildings. From 1935, he initiated the restoration of the Schloss Friedrichswerth.

Extensive collections of written and photographic material were created. On Alvensleben's commission and on the basis of his preliminary work, the Dutch painter Anco Wigboldus drew all of the Alvensleben family's houses in the baroque style of bird's-eye view, after having visited them in his company and ascertained their condition in past centuries under his guidance. Park and manor at Wittenmoor experienced a heyday in its development with numerous guests, lively spiritual exchange and a lot of music. In 1936, Alvensleben had to give up part of its forest areas for the construction of the military training field Truppenübungsplatz Altmark and in 1937 acquired the Keez estate (part of Brüel) near Schwerin in Mecklenburg, which offered him an additional challenge both economically and in terms of design.

During the Second World War, Alvensleben was a soldier in Poland, France, Russia, the Balkans, Italy and finally Norway. His diary during the war (excerpts published in 1971 under the title "Lauter Abschiede") reports on this. Together with the then Superintendent of Stendal Hermann Alberts, he saved the valuable medieval stained glass windows of the Stendal Cathedral by having them stored in his Wittenmoor manor house during the war.

After the expropriation of his property by the so-called land reform in the Soviet occupation zone of Germany in 1945, Alvensleben lived as a refugee in his wife's parents' house, Haus Bodelschwingh near Dortmund. He kept himself and his family afloat with lectures on cultural history and commissioned publications. Soon agricultural and forestry tasks were once again available when his wife inherited the neighbouring small estate of Wasserschloss Haus Rodenberg.

Alvensleben belonged to committees of the forestry industry, the Swedish-German Refugee Aid and the Central German Cultural Council, organised conferences, advised on questions of the restoration of historical gardens and continued his intensive research work. His publications from this period include "Die Lütetsburger Chronik", the history of the Frisian chief family Knyphausen, and "Alvenslebensche Burgen und Landsitze" (Castles and landed estates of the Alvenslebens). He made a major contribution to the fact that the von Alvensleben family resumed their family reunions, which had begun in 1479, after the expulsion in 1945, the rescued parts of the Alvensleben fiefdom library from the 16th century were secured in their holdings and the legendary medieval family ring was given a place of safekeeping commensurate with its importance. After reunification, the ring was entrusted to the cathedral treasure in Halberstadt, the episcopal town closely associated with the family's origins.

From 1914 to 1962, Alvensleben kept an extensive diary, which after his death was compiled and edited by Harald von Koenigswald in parts into castle books and a war diary. These are fascinating cultural-historical testimonies of strong personal expression and judgement.

Alvensleben died in Bodelschwingh at the age of 65.

== Publications ==
- Herrenhausen, Die Sommerresidenz der Welfen (Deutsche Lande Deutsche Kunst), Berlin 1929
- Die Braunschweigischen Schlösser der Barockzeit und ihr Baumeister Hermann Korb, Berlin 1937
- Die Lütetsburger Chronik, Geschichte eines friesischen Häuptlingsgeschlechts, Dortmund 1955
- Alvenslebensche Burgen und Landsitze, Dortmund 1960
- Lebenserinnerungen, unveröffentlichtes Manuskript
- Besuche vor dem Untergang, Adelssitze zwischen Altmark und Masuren, Aus Tagebuchaufzeichnungen von Udo von Alvensleben, Zusammengestellt und herausgegeben von Harald von Koenigswald, Frankfurt-Berlin 1968. Neuauflage: Als es sie noch gab…Adelssitze zwischen Altmark und Masuren. Ullstein, Berlin 1996, ISBN 3-548-35641-9
- Mauern im Strom der Zeit, Schlösser und Schicksale in Niederdeutschland, Aus Tagebuchaufzeichnungen von Udo von Alvensleben, Zusammengestellt und herausgegeben von Harald von Koenigswald, Frankfurt-Berlin 1969
- Schlösser und Schicksale, Herrensitze und Burgen zwischen Donau und Rhein, Aus Tagebuchaufzeichnungen von Udo von Alvensleben, Zusammengestellt und herausgegeben von Harald von Koenigswald, Frankfurt-Berlin 1970
- Lauter Abschiede, Tagebuch im Kriege, Herausgegeben von Harald von Koenigswald, Propyläen Verlag, Berlin 1971, ISBN 3-549-07446-8
