= Wittenmoor =

- Stadtteil of Stendal
- Interactive map of Wittenmoor
- Location within Germany Location within Saxony-Anhalt
- Coordinates: 52°32′23″N 11°41′12″E
- Country: Germany
- State: Saxony-Anhalt
- District: Stendal
- Town: Stendal

Area
  - Total: 17.98 km^{2} (6.94 sq mi)
- Elevation: 55 m (180 ft)

Population (2006-12-31)
  - Total: 282
  - Density: 15.7/km^{2} (40.6/sq mi)
- Time zone: UTC+01:00 (CET)
  - Summer (DST): UTC+02:00 (CEST)
- Postal codes: 39579
- Dialling codes: 039325
- Vehicle registration: SDL

Wittenmoor (German pronunciation: [ˈvɪtn̩ˌmoːɐ̯]) is a village and a former municipality in the district of Stendal, in Saxony-Anhalt, Germany. Since 1 January 2010, it is part of the town Stendal.

== Geography ==
The village Wittenmoor is located in the south of the Altmark, on the northern edge of the Colbitz-Letzlinger Heide. The village is between the Hanseatic city of Stendal and Gardelegn. In Wittenmoor springs the Tangier, a left tributary of the Elbe. The area is slightly hilly, towards the southwest, the wooded terrain rises to 128 m (419.95 ft) above Mean Sea Level.

== History ==
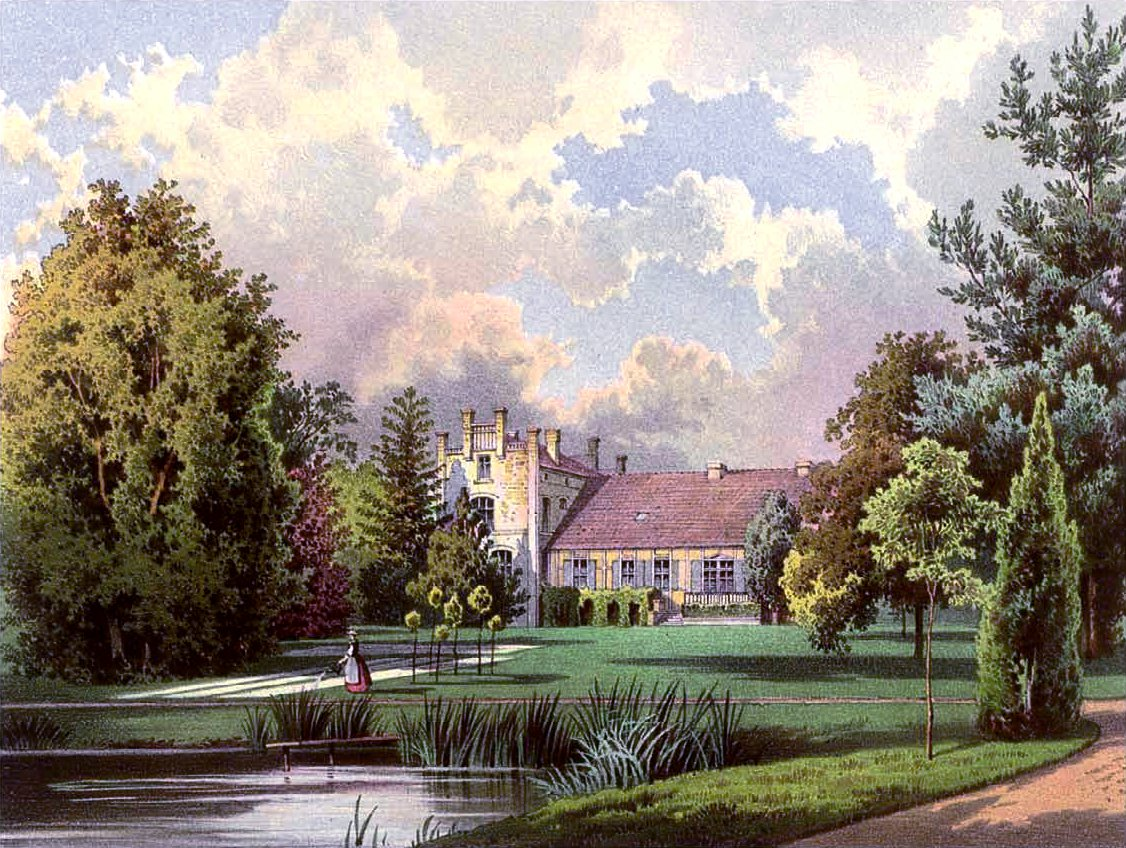
Castle Wittenmoor around 1873/74, Alexander Duncker

Wittenmoor was originally a Church Village and a Manor capable of farming. Wittenmoor was first mentioned as Widmore, in 1140, in a document. The Wittenmoor Church was built in 1895 on the remains of an old cobble foundation. The Vollenschier village church is 20 years older. On 30 September 1928, the Estate Districts of Wintermoor were united with the rural community of Wittenmoor. until December 31, 2009, Wintermoor was an independent municipality of the associated Vollenschier district. In June 2009, through a territorial amendment, the municipal council of the municipality of Wintermoor decided the municipality of Wintermoor would be incorporated into the city of Stendal. This agreement was approved by the county lower municipal supervisor and entered into force on January 1, 2010.

== Notable residents ==
- Udo von Alvensleben (1897-1962), German art historian
- Ludolf Jakob von Alvensleben (1899-1953), German SS-Standartenführer
- Wichard von Alvensleben (1902–1982), German agriculturist, Wehrmacht Officer
