= Hermann Pünder =

German politician

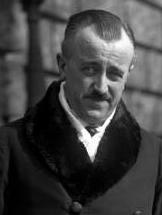
Hermann Pünder

Hermann Josef Pünder (1 April 1888 in Trier – 3 October 1976 in Fulda) was a German politician in the German Centre Party and the Christian Democratic Union. His older brother was the lawyer Werner Pünder.

== Life ==
After attending school in St. Michael-Gymnasium, Bad Münstereifel, Pünder studied Law in Freiburg im Breisgau, Berlin and London. He finished his studies in 1911 with a Dr. jur. In 1919 he became a senior official in the Reich Ministry of Finance, and was then the state secretary from 1926 to 1932 in the Reich Chancellery under the Chancellors Hans Luther (Centre Party), Wilhelm Marx (Centre Party), Hermann Müller (SPD) and Heinrich Brüning (Centre Party).

In his spare time he also taught at the Deutsche Hochschule für Politik in Berlin, partly at the same time as the later President of Germany Theodor Heuss. After the assassination attempt against Hitler on 20 July 1944, Pünder was arrested by the Gestapo, and deported for participating in the conspiracy against Hitler to the concentration camps at Ravensbrück and Buchenwald and Dachau. He belonged to a group of relatively prominent prisoners of the security services of the Third Reich, who were transported all across Germany and were freed in South Tyrol at the end of the war by the Wehrmacht officer Wichard von Alvensleben.
