= Isa Vermehren =

German religious sister, former cabaret artist and film actress

Isa Vermehren (21 April 1918 Lübeck, Germany – 15 July 2009 Bonn, Germany) was a German religious sister, a former cabaret artist and film actress.

== Life ==
Isa Vermehren was born in Lübeck, where she spent her childhood, youth and school time. Because she refused to greet the flag of the German Reich, she was expelled from grammar school in May 1933. Her mother, the journalist Petra Vermehren, moved then to Berlin, taking Isa with her. While Petra Vermehren was hired in April 1934 as the first woman in the foreign policy editorship of the Berliner Tageblatt, the editor of Der Querschnitt, Hermann von Wedderkop, recommended Isa Vermehren to the political-literary cabaret of Werner Finck, Die Katakombe in Berlin, to perform. There she quickly became well known.

With her taunts against the Nazi regime, Isa Vermehren was considered a young talent in the Berlin cabaret. Her accordion "Agathe" became her trademark, to which she sang brisk sailor songs and graceful love ballads. In addition to well-known UFA stars, she took on roles in numerous films. During the Second World War, Isa Vermehren was called up to look after the troops at the front. In 1935 Die Katakombe was closed by order of the National Socialists. Isa Vermehren finished her final secondary-school examinations.

In 1938 Isa Vemehren was baptised into the Roman Catholic Church, together with her brother Erich. After Erich Vermehren defected to the British recruited by Nicholas Elliott in 1944, Isa was arrested with her parents and her other brother Michael. She survived her stay in the concentration camps of Ravensbrück, Buchenwald and Dachau. As a member of the hostage transport for concentration camp prisoners and clan prisoners, she was deported to South Tyrol and freed from the hands of the SS in Niederdorf on 30 April 1945 by Captain Wichard von Alvensleben. In 1946, she described the experiences of those days in her book Reise durch den letzten Akt ("Journey through the last act"). In 1947 Vermehren took on a role in Helmut Käutner's film In Those Days.

Since Isa Vermehren wanted to join a religious order, she studied Catholic theology, German, English, history, and philosophy at the University of Bonn from 1946 to 1951, in order to become acceptable as a postulant for the Society of the Sacred Heart. On 15 September 1951, she entered their monastery St. Adelheid in Bonn. The superiors of the Society recognized Isa Vermehren's ability to convey demanding content in a lively manner. From 1961 she was entrusted with the management of the Sankt-Adelheid-Gymnasium in Beuel-Pützchen; from 1969 until she retired in 1983 she was the director of the Sophie Barat School in Hamburg.

Again Sister Isa became known to a wide audience when she spoke from 1983 to 1995 on ARD Das Wort zum Sonntag.

She died in Bonn in 2009. During her final years she lived again in the monastery of the Sacred Heart in Bonn-Pützchen, where she found her final resting place in the monastery's cemetery.

== Works ==
- At the end of 2016, Sr. Isa's previously unpublished diaries from 1950 to 2009 were published by Patrimonium-Verlag in Aachen. For the years from 1950 to 1960, only handwritten notes were used as the basis for the edition; from 1961, typewritten notes were also available. In terms of content, they span a wide range from Isa Vermehren's entry into the monastery to her death in 2009.
- Reise durch den letzten Akt ISBN 3499240076.
