= Reinhard Goerdeler =

German accountant (1922–1996)

- Born: 26 May 1922; Königsberg, East Prussia, Free State of Prussia, Weimar Republic (now Kaliningrad, Northwestern District, Russia)
- Died: 3 January 1996 (aged 73); Frankfurt am Main, Hesse, Germany
- Occupation: Accountant
- Known for: Founding Klynveld Main Goerdeler
- Father: Carl Friedrich Goerdeler

Reinhard Goerdeler (26 May 1922 – 3 January 1996) was a German accountant who was instrumental in founding Klynveld Main Goerdeler, the leading international firm of accountants.

== Career ==
Goerdeler was born in Königsberg, East Prussia (today Kaliningrad, Russia) as the son of Carl Friedrich Goerdeler, a leading anti-Nazi activist and mayor of the city of Leipzig.

While his father was on trial at the Volksgerichtshof after the 20 July plot, Goerdeler and his family were imprisoned by the Nazis at the Dachau concentration camp and in late April 1945 transferred to Tyrol together with about 140 other prominent inmates, where the SS left the prisoners behind. He was liberated by the Fifth U.S. Army on May 5, 1945.

After leaving full-time education, Goerdeler joined Deutsche Treuhand-Gesellschaft (DTG) and worked his way up to the position of chairman, in which role he sought to expand the firm into an international network which could service his largest clients. His efforts led him to found Klynveld Main Goerdeler in 1979.

Goerdeler was also the first president of the International Federation of Accountants (IFAC), the global organization for the accountancy profession. In retirement he was a trustee of the Max-Reger-Institute until he died on 3 January 1996.
