= T. B. L. Churchill =

Major General Thomas Bell Lindsay Churchill, CB, CBE, MC, was a British soldier who fought in World War II. He was brother of Jack Churchill.

== Military career ==
Churchill attended the Royal Military College, Sandhurst, on a scholarship, passing out sixth, and winning the military history sword.

Churchill was commander of the 2nd Special Service Brigade for part of the war, including the Battle of Monte Cassino.

== Works ==
- The Commandos in Action at Salerno, The Army Quarterly, Vol LI, January 1946
- The Value of Commandos, RUSI, Volume 65, No 577, p86 ff., February 1950,
- The Churchill Chronicles: Annals of a Yeoman Family, ed Toby Churchill & John Churchill, First Impressions, 1986
- Commando Crusade, William Kimber & Co Ltd, 224 pages, 1987.
