= Prominente =

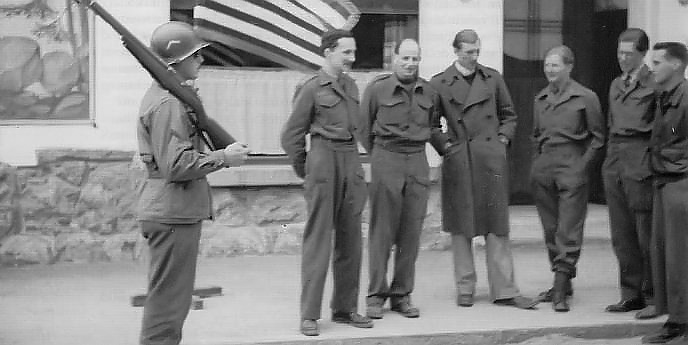
Members of the Prominenten, under a U.S. guard, outside the Hungerberg Hotel on May 5, 1945, shortly after their release. L to R: John Elphinstone, Max de Hamel, Michael Alexander, unknown, George Lascelles, and John Winant Jr.

The German term Prominente (singular masculine Prominenter) was used in World War II to describe high-profile prisoners from various countries that were imprisoned in, for example, the POW camp for officers Colditz (Oflag IV-C) or the Nazi concentration camps Sachsenhausen and Dachau for possible use as hostages. These prisoners had among them former statesmen, politicians, political dissidents and priests as well as prisoners of war related, or believed to be related, to allied politicians and royals. The Colditz POWs were liberated on 14 April 1945 by the U.S. Army, whereas the prisoners from Sachsenhausen and Dachau were liberated from their SS-guards in turn by troops from the Wehrmacht and shortly thereafter by units from the 42nd Infantry Division and the 45th Infantry Division after the transport of concentration camp inmates to Tyrol.
