= Wichard von Alvensleben =

German military officer and nobleman

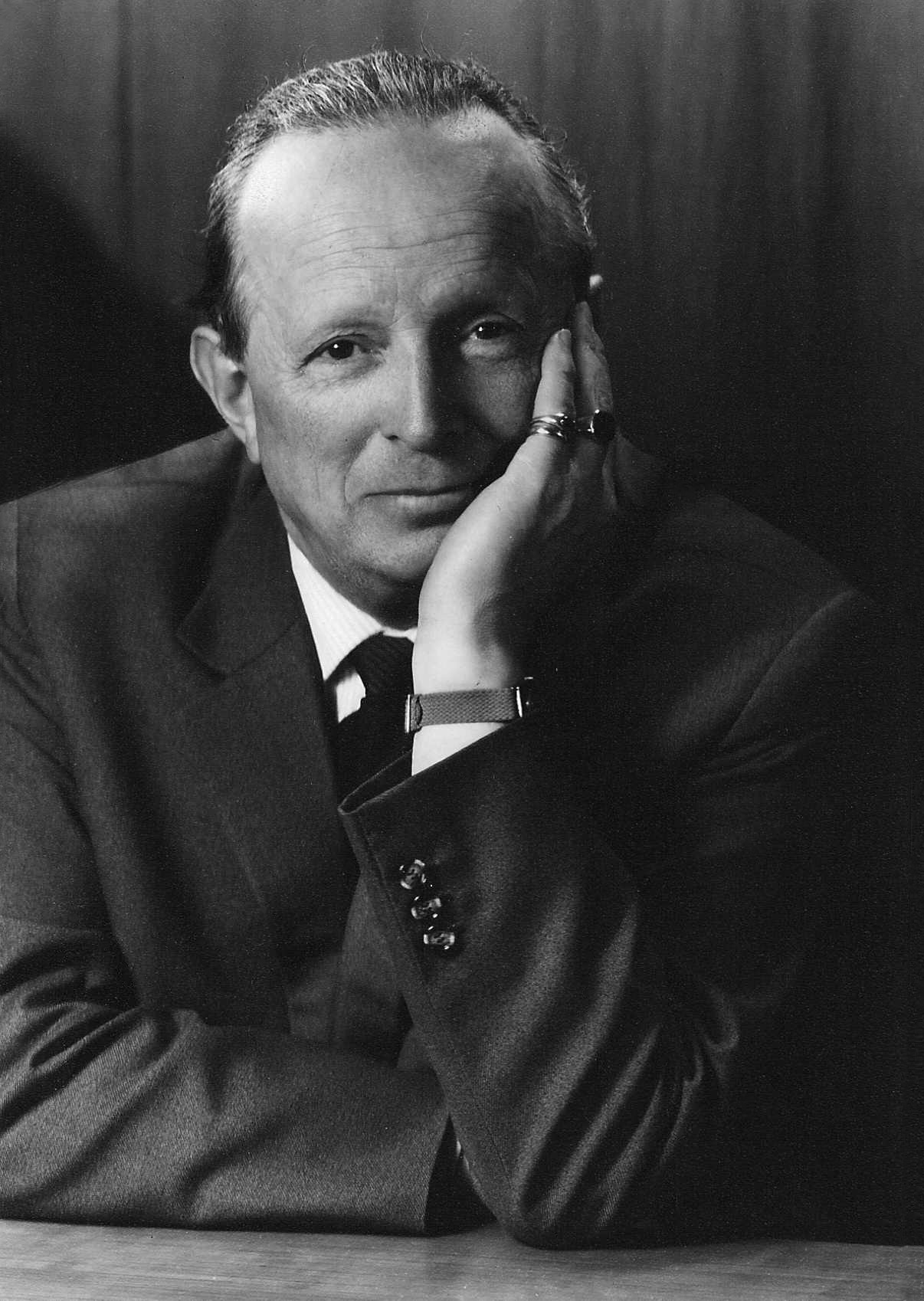
- von Alvensleben in 1960
- Born: 19 May 1902; Wittenmoor, Province of Saxony, German Empire
- Died: 14 August 1982 (aged 80); Ascheberg, North Rhine-Westphalia, West Germany
- Spouses: Cora von Erxleben (m. 1927; died 1945) Astrid von Brand (m. 1946; died 1982)
- Military career
- Allegiance: Nazi Germany
- Branch: Heer
- Service years: 1939–1945
- Rank: Hauptmann
- Known for: Liberation of prominent prisoners in South Tyrol
- Conflicts: World War II Invasion of Poland: Western Front; Battle of France; Eastern Front; Operation Barbarossa (WIA); Mediterranean theater; North African campaign; Italian campaign (POW)
- Awards: Iron Cross 1st Class Wound Badge Infantry Assault Badge
- Other work: agriculturist, estate administrator, and transport operator

Wichard von Alvensleben (19 May 1902 – 14 August 1982) was a German agriculturist, Wehrmacht Officer, and Knight of the Order of Saint John. He was a member of the aristocratic House of Alvensleben, one of the oldest in Germany.

As a captain, Alvensleben commanded the Wehrmacht troops stationed at Bozen, in April 1945, whence he led a detachment of infantry to liberate a group of high-status prisoners being held by the SS at Niederdorf in South Tyrol. His brother, SS-Colonel Ludolf Jakob von Alvensleben, was commander (SS and Police Leader) of all SS troops in the area (Adria-West) at that time.

== Early life ==
Alvensleben was born on 19 May 1902, in Wittenmoor (now part of Stendal) to Ludolf Udo von Alvensleben (1852–1923) and Ida, née von Glasenapp (1866–1924). His older brother was historian Udo von Alvensleben. He was taught in various convent schools at Magdeburg in Brandenburg an der Havel and passed his Abitur in 1921 at the Klosterschule Roßleben. After four years of practical training he commenced studies in agriculture, forestry, and law in Eberswalde and Munich.

In 1927, Alvensleben married Cora von Erxleben and started to work at his wife's country estates at Tankow-Seegenfelde in the district of Friedeberg, then in the Province of Brandenburg, part of the German Free State of Prussia, and at Dertzow in the district of Soldin, New March, also in the province of Brandenburg, in 1929. In 1936, he bought the forested estate of Viarthlum, in the district of Rummelsburg, in the Free State Province of Pomerania. All were in areas transferred to Poland by the Potsdam Agreement in August 1945 following the end of World War II.

Alvensleben had two daughters, born in 1934 and 1936. A deeply religious Christian, he had become by then a Knight of Justice of the Order of Saint John.

== Military service ==
In 1939, Alvensleben became an Officer of the German Wehrmacht, earning the rank of Captain, and served in Poland, France, Russia, Africa, and Italy. He was wounded in 1941 in Russia and received various decorations, including the Wound Badge, the Infantry Assault Badge, and the Iron Cross 1st Class.

On 29 January 1945, his wife committed suicide at the arrival of the Soviet Red Army at the family estate in Tankow-Seegenfelde.

In late April 1945, a group of 140 high-status prisoners (Prominente) were transferred to Tyrol, guarded by SS troops. A Wehrmacht colonel among the prisoners contacted senior German army officers, made known the identity of these prisoners, and conveyed the apprehension that they were all to be executed. A regular German army unit under the command of Captain von Alvensleben was assigned by nearby military authorities to protect the prisoners. Outnumbered, the SS guards moved out, leaving the prisoners behind. The prisoners were then set free, with the majority opting for sanctuary for a time in Pragser Wildsee under the protection of Alvensleben's troops until a U.S. force arrived to take custody.

== After the war ==
In autumn 1945, Alvensleben was released from U.S. custody and started to work as a transport operator in a sugar refinery in Nörten-Hardenberg. In August 1946, Alvensleben married Astrid von Brand (widowed von Brockdorff-Ahlefeldt) and in 1952 he became an administrator of the von Brockdorff estate Ascheberg near Plön. In 1956, Alvensleben was involved with Diakonisches Werk, a charity organisation of the Lutheran Church at Rendsburg. He retired in 1974 and died on 14 August 1982, in Ascheberg.

== See also ==
- House of Alvensleben

== Literature ==
- Hartmut Jäckel: Menschen in Berlin. Stuttgart, München 2001, S. 46–48.
- Hans-Günter Richardi: SS-Geiseln in der Alpenfestung. Bozen 2005
