= Erich Vermehren =

German anti-Nazi agent (1919–2005)

- Born: 23 December 1919
- Died: 28 April 2005 (aged 85)
- Other names: Erich Vermeeren de Saventhem Eric Maria de Saventhem

Erich Vermehren (23 December 1919 – 28 April 2005), also known as Erich Vermeeren de Saventhem or Eric Maria de Saventhem, was an ardent anti-Nazi, an agent of the Abwehr, the German military intelligence organization, and later a leading traditionalist Catholic.

== Early life ==
Erich Vermehren was born in Lübeck to a family of lawyers whose opposition to the Nazi regime was such that they were considered politically unreliable. His mother, Petra Vermehren, was an author.

Vermehren's repeated refusal to join the Hitler Youth marked him as unfit to "represent German youth", and he was prevented from taking up a Rhodes scholarship at Oxford University. His passport was revoked, making it impossible for him to travel outside Germany.

Vermehren converted to Roman Catholicism in 1939, shortly after his elder sister Isa, when he met the Countess Elisabeth von Plettenberg, a member of one of Germany's leading Catholic families. They married in October 1941. The Plettenbergs were also opposed to Hitler, and clandestinely distributed the banned anti-Nazi Papal encyclical Mit brennender Sorge in 1937. As a result of this, Elisabeth's parents were imprisoned by the Gestapo, but she was able to secure their release after three weeks. In addition, she herself was repeatedly questioned about her "subversive" activities.

== As an Abwehr agent ==
Despite the Vermehrens' unwillingness to openly resist the Nazi regime, they inevitably found themselves in anti-Nazi circles, several of which centered on Vermehren's cousin Adam von Trott zu Solz, and both felt that their lives were at risk while they remained in Germany. Vermehren was excluded from military service due to a childhood injury, but managed to get himself assigned to the Abwehr late in 1943 with the help of Von Trott and Paul Leverkühn, the Abwehr station chief in Istanbul.

At that time, Admiral Wilhelm Canaris, head of the Abwehr, was making peace overtures to the Americans with the help of the German ambassador to Turkey, Franz von Papen, who had been asked to meet Archbishop (later Cardinal) Francis Spellman. Von Papen was a cousin of Elisabeth Vermehren, and as a result of this family tie, Vermehren was assigned to Istanbul as a junior-grade agent after two weeks' training in secret inks. Elisabeth, however, was detained by the Gestapo as a hostage.

== Defection ==
When Vermehren returned to Berlin on leave, the couple agreed they would defect to Britain. So that Elisabeth could travel to Istanbul, she procured an official assignment from the Foreign Office in connection with the Archbishop's visit to Turkey. They travelled by train to Istanbul, but at the border crossing into Bulgaria, Elisabeth was arrested by Gestapo agents and taken to the German embassy in Sofia, though Vermehren was permitted to continue to Istanbul. In Sofia, the ambassador was a family friend who (in cooperation with the Abwehr station chief) sneaked her on board a diplomatic courier plane to Istanbul. Meanwhile, Erich had made overtures to the British Secret Intelligence Service, which already had a file on him, through its counter-espionage representative Nicholas Elliott.

The couple received word that a friend from the Foreign Office, Otto Carl Kiep, had been arrested on 12 January 1944 in connection with his attendance at the Frau Solf Tea Party. The Gestapo summoned them to Berlin in connection with the case, but anticipating what was in store for them, they refused, and defected in early February 1944. In the hope that their families would be protected from Sippenhaft (detention for the crimes of a family member) as a result of their defection, their defection was made to appear to be a kidnapping by the British. The Vermehrens were smuggled to England via İzmir, Aleppo, Cairo and Gibraltar.

British propaganda organisations broke the news of the defection, knowing that it would cause havoc in Germany's intelligence services, especially since the invasion of Western Europe was imminent. It was believed that he had absconded with the Abwehr's secret codes. This was untrue, but according to British records, Vermehren nevertheless gave much valuable information to the Allies about German intelligence operations. Hitler now distrusted the Abwehr and Canaris, and on 18 February 1944 the Abwehr was abolished and its intelligence functions taken over by the SS Security organisation (RSHA), under the jurisdiction of Heinrich Himmler.

Several members of the couple's families were arrested and interned, including Erich's parents, his elder brother Michael and sister Isa Vermehren, and Elisabeth's youngest sister Gisela. All of them survived the war. Isa wrote of her time in prison camps in the book, A Journey through the Final Act: Ravensbrück, Buchenwald, Dachau: A Woman Reports.

== In England ==
The Vermehrens were given accommodation in the South Kensington flat of the mother of Kim Philby, where they provided him with lists of personalities of the Catholic underground in Germany. As these Catholic figures were as equally opposed to Communism as Nazism, Philby, a Soviet spy, handed the list over to his handlers; when the British tried to contact the list of personages at the end of the war, it was found that most of them had been killed. The couple also tried unsuccessfully to persuade the British Foreign Office to allow leading members of the German opposition to help in rebuilding the country. They then asked for their status as "Guests of the Foreign Office" to be annulled and to be left to their own devices. Elisabeth found employment as an assistant teacher in Worth Priory, a preparatory school run by the Benedictine Order while Erich founded a small export company, which had limited success, and later found employment with a firm of brokers with Lloyd's of London. They settled near the Church of the Immaculate Heart of Mary in Brompton Road, and changed their surname to Vermehren de Saventhem for genealogical reasons.

== Later years ==
The de Saventhems settled in Zürich in the 1960s with Erich managing his firm's Swiss subsidiary until he was promoted as Director for Europe in 1964. They then lived in Paris before moving back to Switzerland in 1966. They became active in the Catholic Traditionalist Movement following the Second Vatican Council. Erich was one of the founding members of the Una Voce movement, becoming its first president.

The couple returned to Germany in view of Elisabeth's failing health, and she died there in 2000. Erich died in Bonn in 2005.

== Main source ==
- Bassett, Richard. "A Lion of the Faith". Obituary of Erich Vermehren de Saventhem in The Independent, 3 May 2005.
