= Vodno =

Mountain in North Macedonia

- Водно
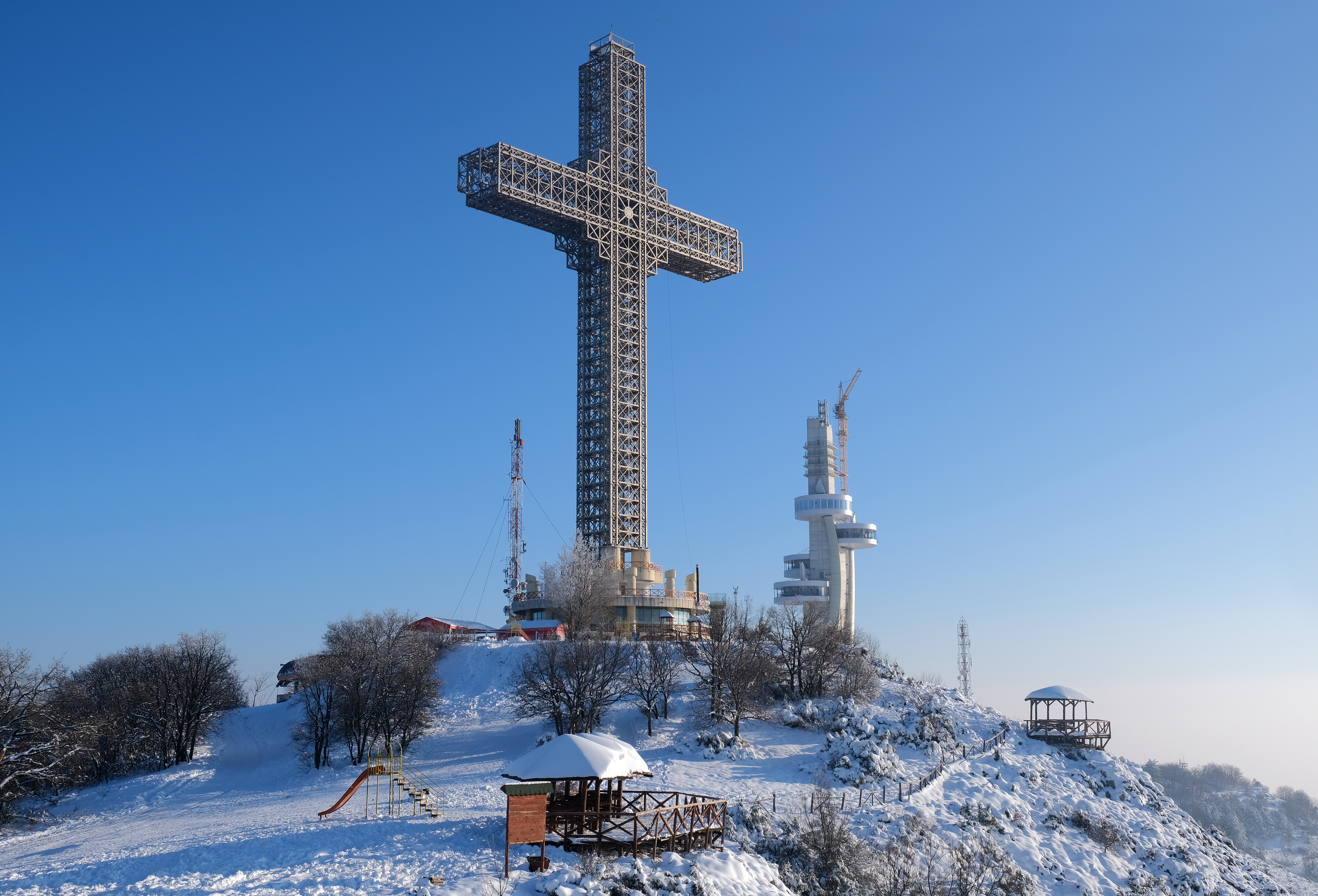
- Top of Vodno

Highest point
- Elevation: 1,066 m (3,497 ft)
- Coordinates: 41°57′55″N 21°23′40″E

Geography
- Location within North Macedonia
- Location: Skopje, North Macedonia

Vodno (Macedonian: Водно) is a mountain in North Macedonia. It is located in the northern part of the country, to the southwest of the capital city Skopje. The highest point of the mountain is on Krstovar peak, at 1066 meters and the submontane is at 337 meters (Middle Vodno is on 557 m). In 2002, the Millennium Cross was built on Krstovar peak, a Christian Cross measuring 66 meters tall, to commemorate 2,000 years of Christianity in Macedonia. It is one of the tallest crosses worldwide.

== Climate ==
The climate in Vodno is cold and temperate. Vodno has a significant amount of rainfall during the year. This is true even for the driest month. The average temperature is 23 °C (73 °F). The lowest temperature measured on the mountain, in January 2017, is −24 °C (−11 °F); and the highest measured temperature, in July 2005, is 43 °C (109 °F).

== Hydrography ==
Vodno has a heterogeneous hydrographic web: streams, vaults, waterfalls, springs. Vodno has a lot of streams which are used by the shepherds for feeding their goats and for watering the wild chestnuts.

Vodno has two types of vaults:

- Arterial
- Well water

The objects that are on a higher above sea level are using the arterial underground water, and the objects that are placed on lower above sea level use the well water ones.

The water is bacteriologically and chemically clean.

Vodno has a mini waterfall which is 15 meters high and is more active in spring when the snow coverlet is melting.

Vodno has a lot of springs too that are used for the need of the local people.

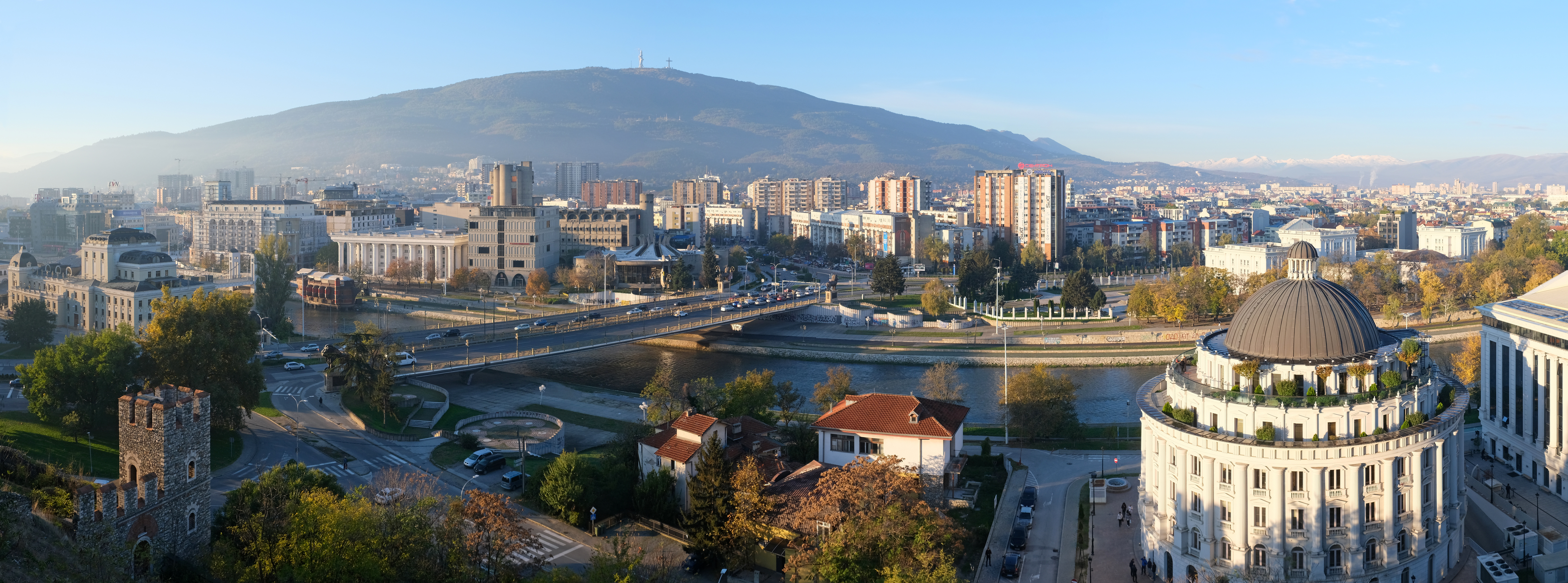
Vodno dominates the Skopje cityscape.

== Vegetation ==
On Vodno mountain, deciduous and evergreen plants can be found.

From the deciduous, there is the wild chestnut, lime tree, oak etc.

The evergreen plants are in bigger number related to the deciduous one. From the evergreen plants there is pine from both sides of the mountain. In smaller number there are the juniperus and the boxwood.

== Fauna ==
Animals include:

- Small animals: partridge, rabbit, fox, squirrel, marten, snake, birds of smaller type and insects.
- Larger animals: boar, wolf, deer.

== Tourism ==
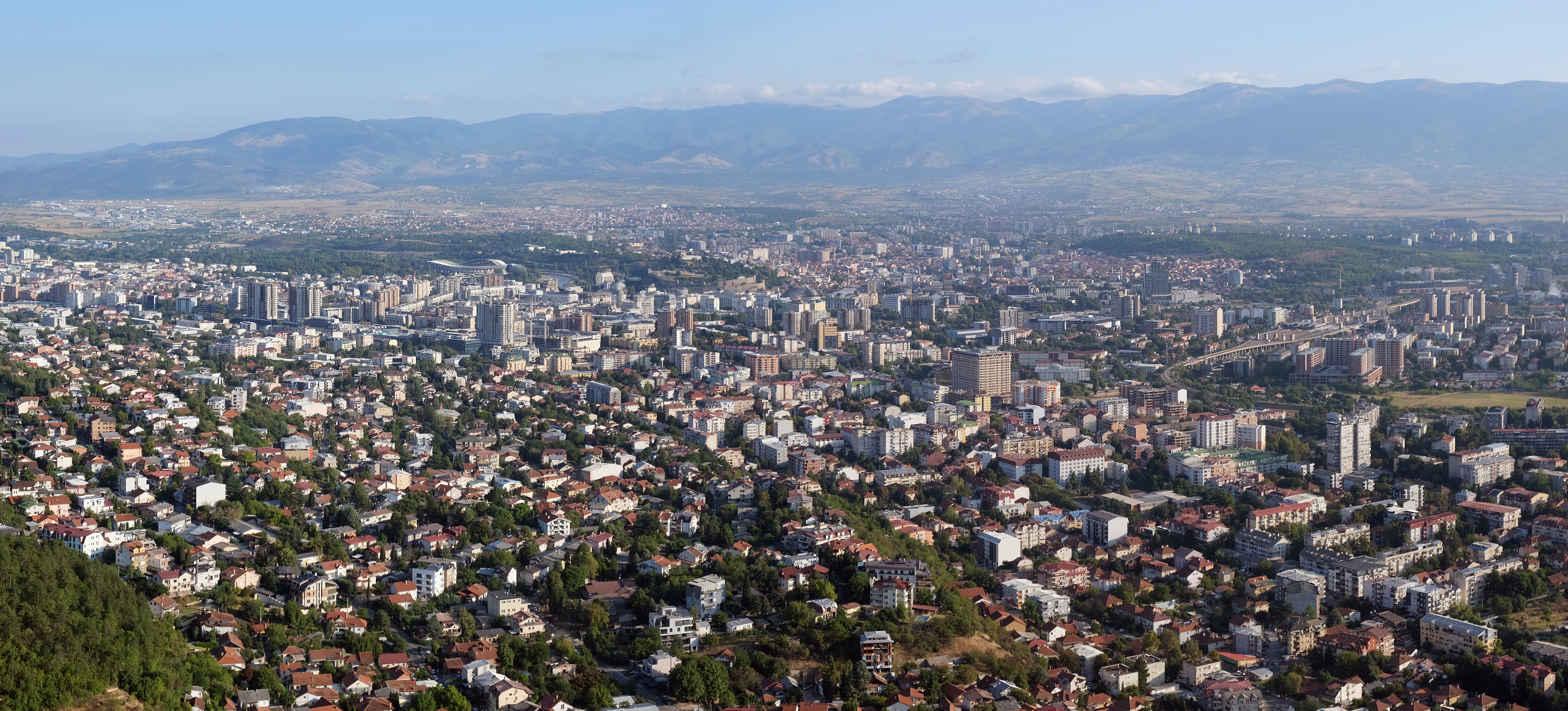
Skopje seen from Vodno

The tourism on Vodno mountain can be divided into:

- Recreational tourism
- Cultural tourism
- Modern tourism

=== Recreational Tourism ===
Additionally the hike from Middle Vodno (557 m) to the Krstovar Peak (1066 m), where the Millennium Cross is located, has become a highly attractive leisure activity. The increase in interest in this activity can be attributed to the opening of a bus-line that makes round-trips from the Skopje City Centre to Middle Vodno, as well as the availability of cable transport from Middle Vodno to Krstovar Peak.

=== Cultural tourism ===
Various manifestations, churches, monasteries and monuments can be found on Vodno.

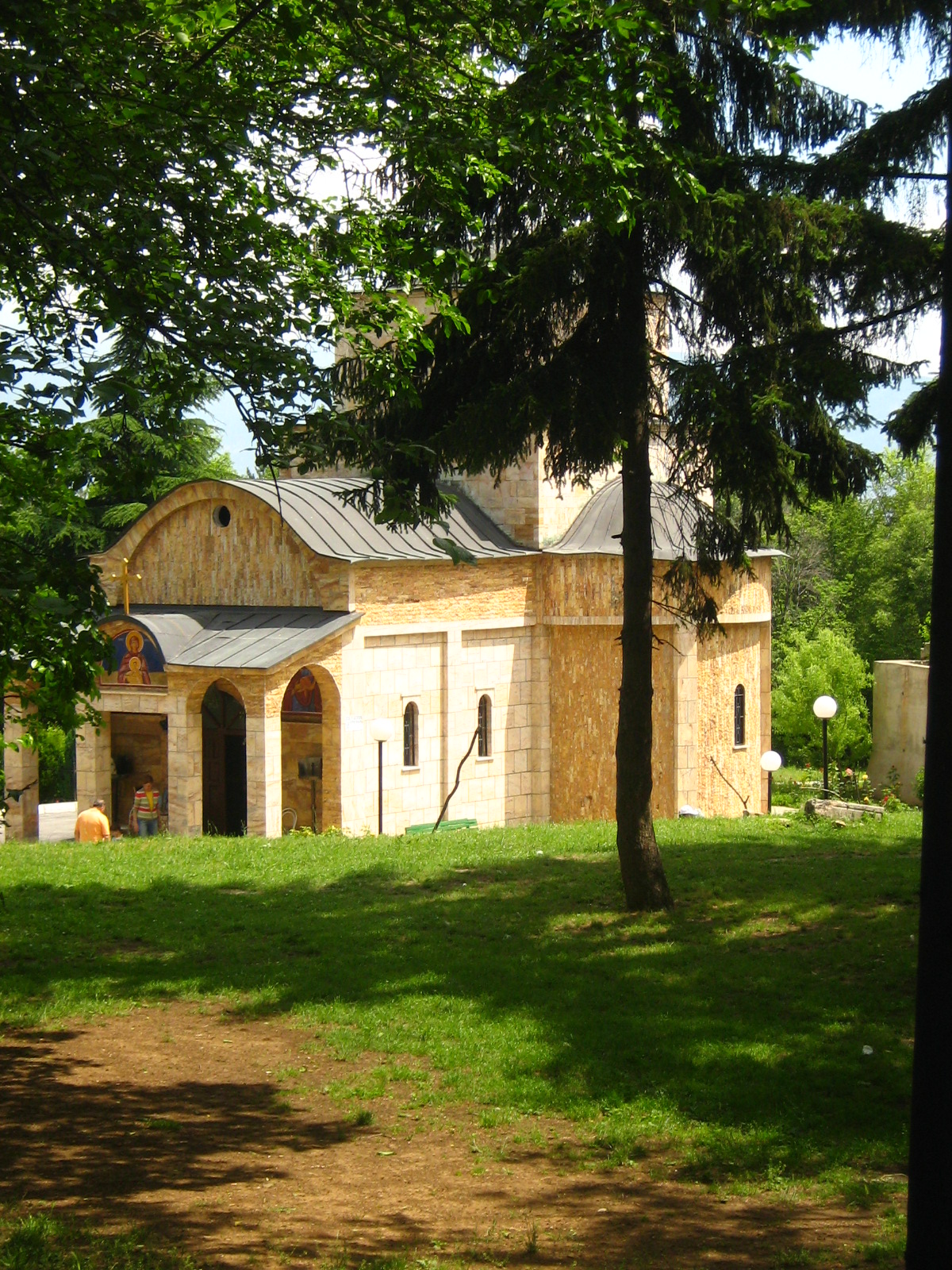
Middle Vodno Monastery, Mala Bogorodica

==== Churches and monasteries ====
- Churches:
- Saint Spas - Dolno Sonje
- Saint Spas - Sopishte
- Saint Mina - Sopishte
- Saint Nicolas - Gorno Sonje
- Saint Panteleimon - Dolno Nerezi
- Monasteries:
- Saint Panteleimon - Nerezi
- Saint Trifun - 5 km from Vodno

The churches are an important part of the cultural-historical heritage, and have remained there for years. The older churches and monasteries are very significant because they have kept their authenticity, due to not having been reconstructed, but rather having survived through the ages. They attract more visitors due to their historical significance.

==== Manifestations ====
- Christmas Eve Celebration
- Setting for seasonal motorsport events in hillclimb discipline
- Eco Projects

==== Monuments ====
- Millennium Cross
- Big Stone
- War Caves from the 1940
- Destroyed houses from 1944
- Remnant war objects from 1950

The monuments are the most visited attractions on Mount Vodno. One of the most distinct landmarks on Mount Vodno is the Millennium Cross. Found on the peak of Mount Vodno, and standing at 66 metres high, it is one of the most visited locations in the Skopje region. It was constructed in 2002, in order to commemorate 2000 years since the birth of Christ, and serves as a memorial of two millennia of Christianity.

=== Cable car ===
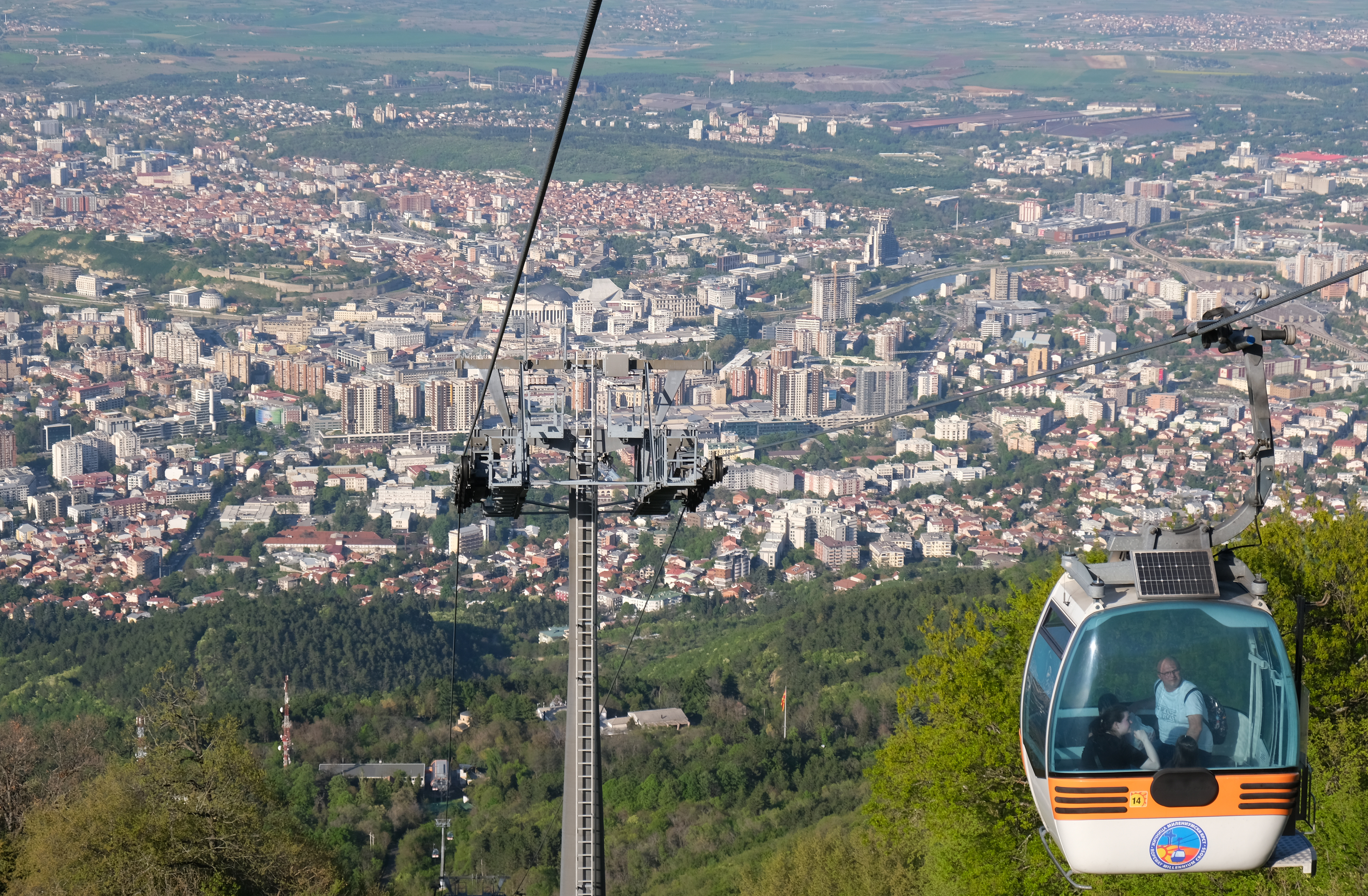
Cable cars

As of 2011, a gondola lift has been in operation to allow an easy ascent to visit the Millennium Cross. The ropeway includes 28 regular gondolas for eight persons and two VIP gondolas for four people. The lift starts at Middle Vodno and ends at the Millennium Cross. The route is 1,750m long, with the ride lasting 6–8 minutes.

== See also ==
- Matka Canyon
