= Sidney Lee =

English biographer and critic (1859–1926)

Sir Sidney Lee FSA FBA
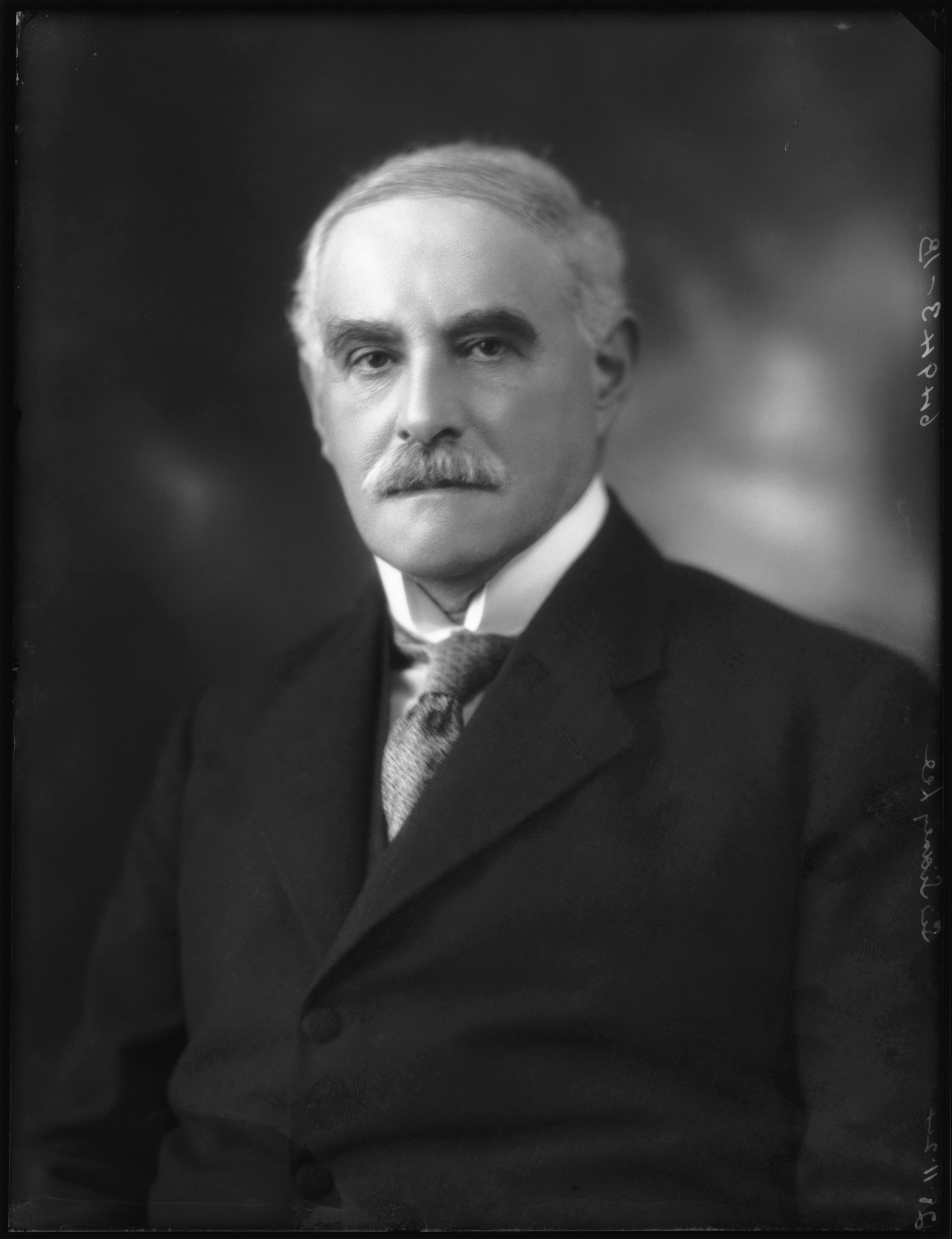
- Sir Sidney in 1924
- Born: Solomon Lazarus Lee; 5 December 1859; Bloomsbury, London, England
- Died: 3 March 1926 (aged 66); Kensington, London, England
- Education: City of London School
- Alma mater: Balliol College, Oxford
- Occupations: Biographer; writer; critic
- Relatives: Elizabeth Lee (sister)

Sir Sidney Lee (5 December 1859 – 3 March 1926) was an English biographer, writer, and critic.

== Biography ==
Lee was born Solomon Lazarus Lee in 1859 at 12 Keppel Street, Bloomsbury, London, England. He was educated at the City of London School and at Balliol College, Oxford, where he graduated in Modern History in 1882. In 1883, Lee became assistant-editor of the Dictionary of National Biography. In 1890, he became joint editor and, on the retirement of Sir Leslie Stephen in 1891, succeeded him as editor.

Lee wrote more than 800 articles in the Dictionary, mainly on Elizabethan authors or statesmen. His sister Elizabeth Lee also contributed. While still at Balliol, Lee had written two articles on Shakespearean questions, which were printed in The Gentleman's Magazine. In 1884, he published a book about Stratford-upon-Avon, with illustrations by Edward Hull. Lee's entry on Shakespeare in the 51st volume (1897) of the Dictionary of National Biography formed the basis of his Life of William Shakespeare (1898), which reached its fifth edition in 1905.

In 1902, Lee edited the Oxford facsimile edition of the first folio of Shakespeare's comedies, histories and tragedies, followed in 1902 and 1904 by supplementary volumes giving details of extant copies, and in 1906 by a complete edition of Shakespeare's works.

Lee received a knighthood in 1911. Between 1913 and 1924, he served as professor of English Literature and Language at East London College. In 1915, he delivered the British Academy's Shakespeare Lecture.

== Works ==
Besides the editions of English classics, Lee's works include:

- Queen Victoria: A Biography (1902)
- Great Englishmen of the Sixteenth century (1904), based on his Lowell Institute lectures at Boston, Massachusetts, in 1903
- Shakespeare and the Modern Stage (1906)
- Principles of Biography, London: Cambridge University Press, 1911, Wikidata Q107333538
- "Shakespeare and the Italian Renaissance". Proceedings of the British Academy, 1915–1916. 7: 121–143. 1976. Annual Shakespeare Lecture of the British Academy (1915)
- Shakespeare's England: an account of the life & manners of his age (1916, with Walter Alexander Raleigh)
- King Edward VII, a Biography (1925) (The second volume of the biography was completed, after Lee's death, by S. F. Markham and published in 1927. See "King Edward VII: A Biography: Volume II: The Reign, 22nd January 1901 to 6th May 1910" by Sir Sidney Lee [New York: The Macmillan Company, 1927], page vi.)

There are personal letters from Lee, including those written during his final illness, in the T. F. Tout Collection of the John Rylands Library in Manchester.

== See also ==
- John Denham Parsons
