= Elizabeth Lee (writer) =

British writer (1857–1920)

- Born: 1857; London, United Kingdom of Great Britain and Ireland
- Died: 10 July 1920 (aged 62); Kensington, London, United Kingdom of Great Britain and Ireland
- Education: Queen's College, London
- Occupation: Teacher
- Known for: Dictionary of National Biography, works on education, French literature and biographies.
- Relatives: Sir Sidney Lee (brother)
- Awards: Officier d'Académie

Elizabeth Lee (1857 – 10 July 1920) was an English teacher, literary critic, biographer and translator. She was secretary of the English Association for five years in the early twentieth century and was awarded the honour of Officier d'Académie by the French government for her work in education. She was the sister of Sir Sidney Lee and, under his editorship, wrote several biographies of women for the Dictionary of National Biography. Her other writings covered the subjects of education, French literature and biographies.

== Biography ==
Lee was born in London, the older sister of Sidney Lee. The family name was Levy. She was educated at Queen's College, London. After leaving school, she began teaching English to girls in secondary schools, a career she maintained all of her life.

From 1907 to 1912, she was secretary of the English Association. While in this post, she studied education methods on the continent and published the pamphlet The Teaching of Literature in French and German Secondary Schools. On 1 November 1909 the French Minister of Public Instruction made her Officier d'Académie.

In addition to education, Lee wrote frequently about French literature and biographies of women. For several years, she contributed an article about French literature to every issue of The Library. She published books such as Ouida: a Memoir (1914) and Lives of the Wives of Queen Victoria's Prime Ministers (1917). One of her major works was the writing of over eighty biographies of women for the Dictionary of National Biography, which was edited by her younger brother Sir Sidney Lee. She also aided her brother with his other works, including correcting the proofs and compiling the index for his Life of William Shakespeare (1905, 5th edition).

Elizabeth Lee died at the age of 62 in her home in Kensington on Saturday, 10 July 1920. She was cremated at Golders Green Crematorium on the following Tuesday, 13 July.

== Bibliography ==
- Humour of France (1893)
- Dictionary of National Biography (81 entries, 1885-1900 and the 1901 supplement)
- The English Novel in the Time of Shakespeare (1890 translation, original by J. J. Jusserand)
- The Teaching of Literature in French and German Secondary Schools (1911)
- A School History of English Literature (3 vols)
- Selections from English Literature (4 vols)
- Ouida: a Memoir (1914)
- Lives of the Wives of Queen Victoria's Prime Ministers (1917)
- The Library (multiple articles)
