= Millennium Cross =

Cross in North Macedonia

Coordinates: 41.965098°N 21.394549°E

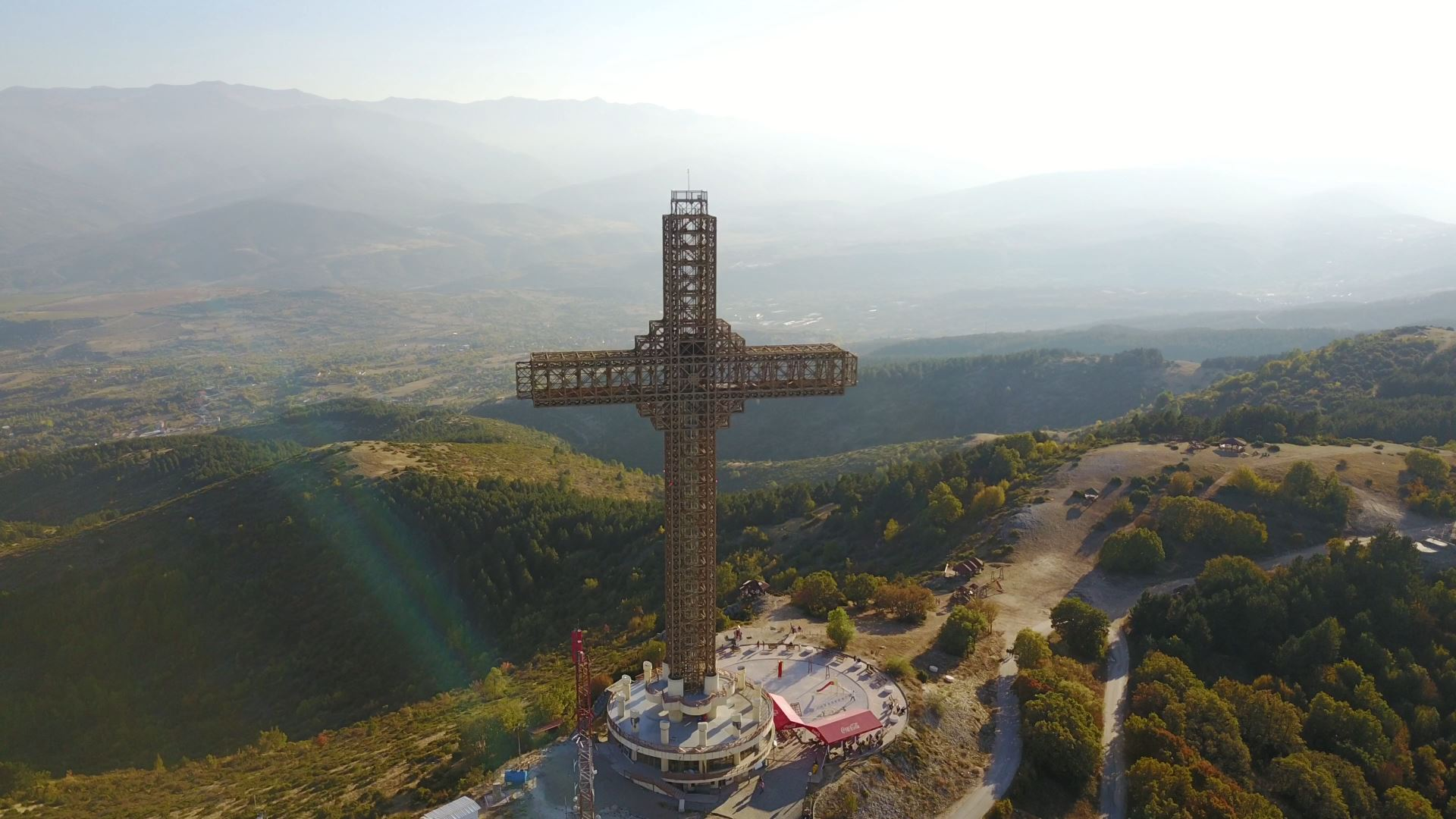
Aerial View of The Millennium Cross

The Millennium Cross (Macedonian: Милениумски крст, Mileniumski krst) is a 66-metre (217 ft) tall cross situated on the top of Vodno Mountain in North Macedonia above the capital city of Skopje. Built in 2002, it is one of the tallest crosses worldwide. It was constructed to serve as a memorial for 2,000 years of Christianity in Macedonia and to honour biblical passages citing the evangelisation activities of St. Paul within the region. The monument has become a symbol associated with or representing Skopje. As a landmark, the cross has turned into a tourist destination with the best observation point to see the panorama of the capital city.

== Design structure ==
The monument is based on a grid design, similar to the French Eiffel Tower and has the traditional shape of a Christian cross without other additions or elements. It is constructed on a twelve column platform symbolically representing the twelve apostles. Inside the cross there is an elevator to the top level for views of Skopje. From the south side of the city the towering Millennium Cross atop Vodno mountain dominates the panorama of Skopje. The monument is visible from almost all areas of the capital and its presence is felt by strolling urban residents or people entering the city as it draws focal attention. At night the cross can be seen as its covered in thousands of lights.

== History ==
=== Planning and construction of Millennium Cross ===
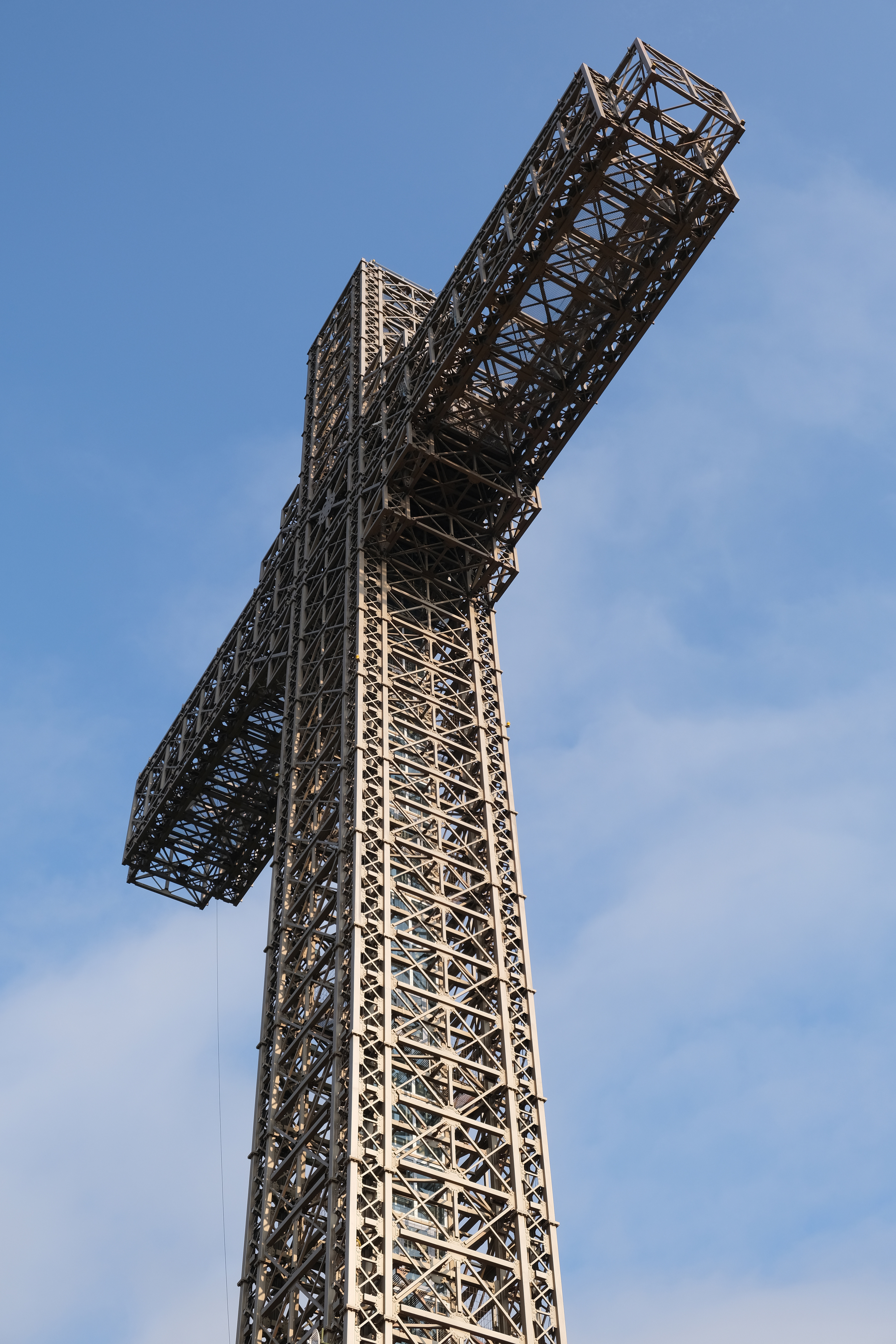
View of Millennium Cross, Skopje.

Following the breakup of Yugoslavia and independence of Macedonia, different ethno-religious groups in the country competed with each other to leave their mark upon the urban landscape of Skopje, especially after the inter-ethnic conflict of 2001 As elections approached, Prime Minister Ljubčo Georgievski and his VMRO-DPMNE government raised the idea of constructing the Millennium Cross in his efforts to gain support. The Macedonian Orthodox Church (MOC) endorsed the proposal and initiated the project. Construction of the cross in 2002 was an enterprise stemming from the pro-Orthodox policies of the MOC that had the backing of Prime Minister Georgievski. The Millennium Cross project was named by government officials as the Symbol of Christianity. The top part of a hill on Vodno Mountain was publicly owned land and selected as the site for the monument in an area of Skopje populated mainly by ethnic Macedonians and half a mile distance from a military base. In August 2002 a dedication ceremony was held for the Millennium Cross and 70,000 people were in attendance. Construction of the monument was completed in 2019.

The construction of the Millennium Cross was funded by the Macedonian Orthodox Church, the Macedonian government and donations from Macedonians from all over the world. The cross was built on the highest point of the Vodno mountain on a place known since the time of the Ottoman Empire as "Krstovar", meaning "Place of the cross", as there was a smaller cross situated there. On 8 September 2018, the Independence Day of the Republic of North Macedonia, an elevator was installed inside the cross. In 2019, a restaurant and a souvenir shop were opened next to the cross. In 2011 the Millennium Cross ropeway was opened, and is three and a half kilometres long.

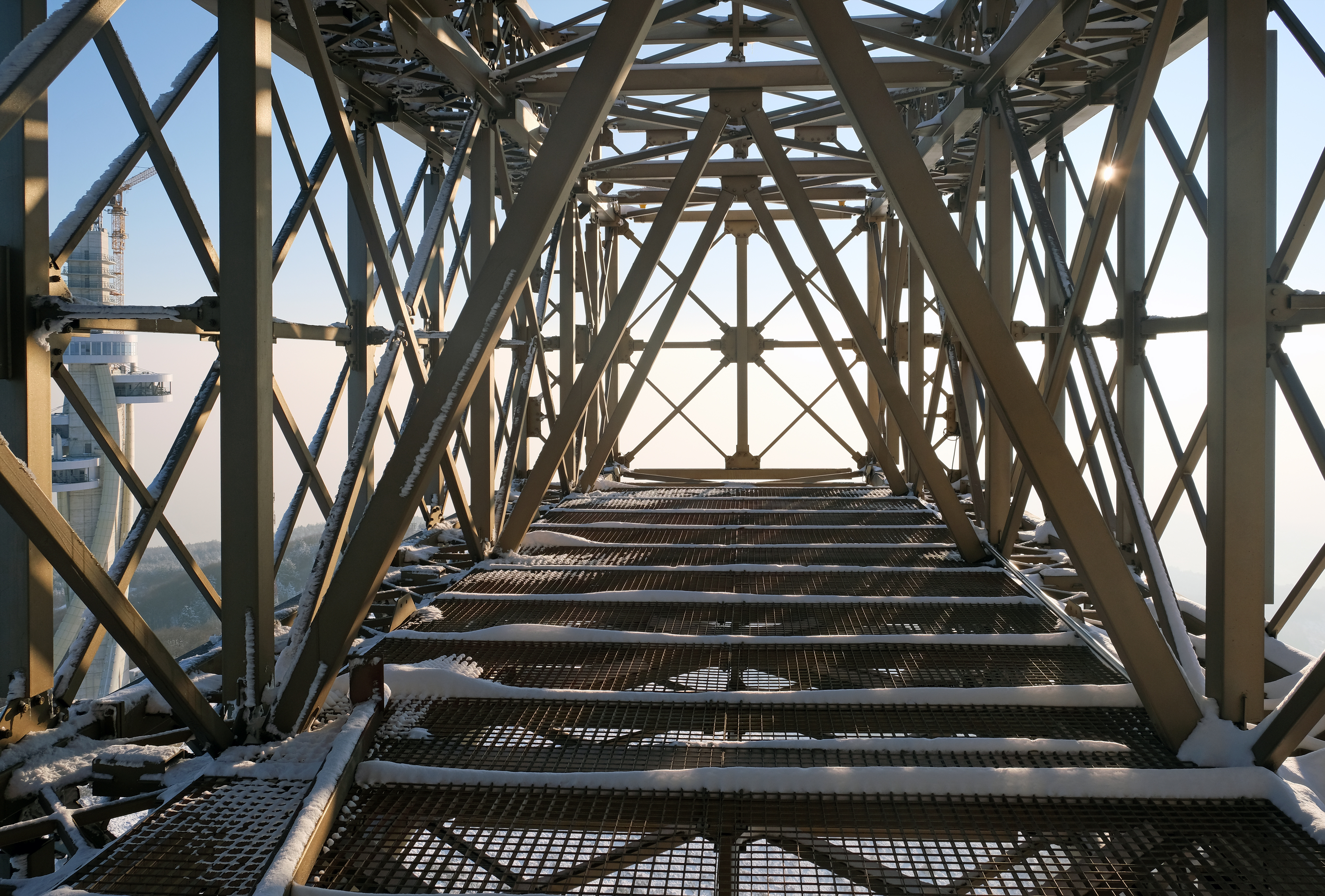
Inside view of the cross

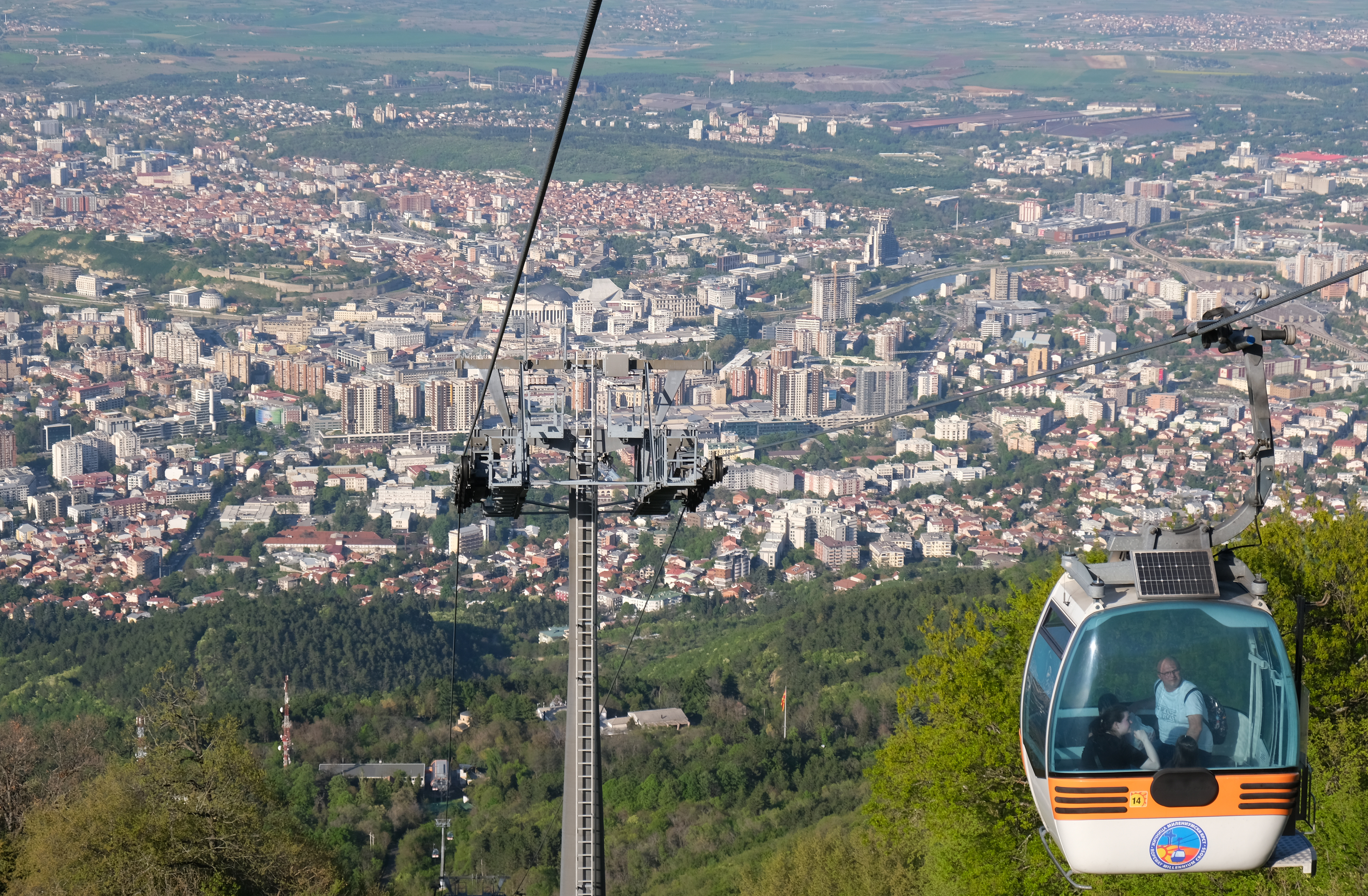
Millennium Cross ropeway

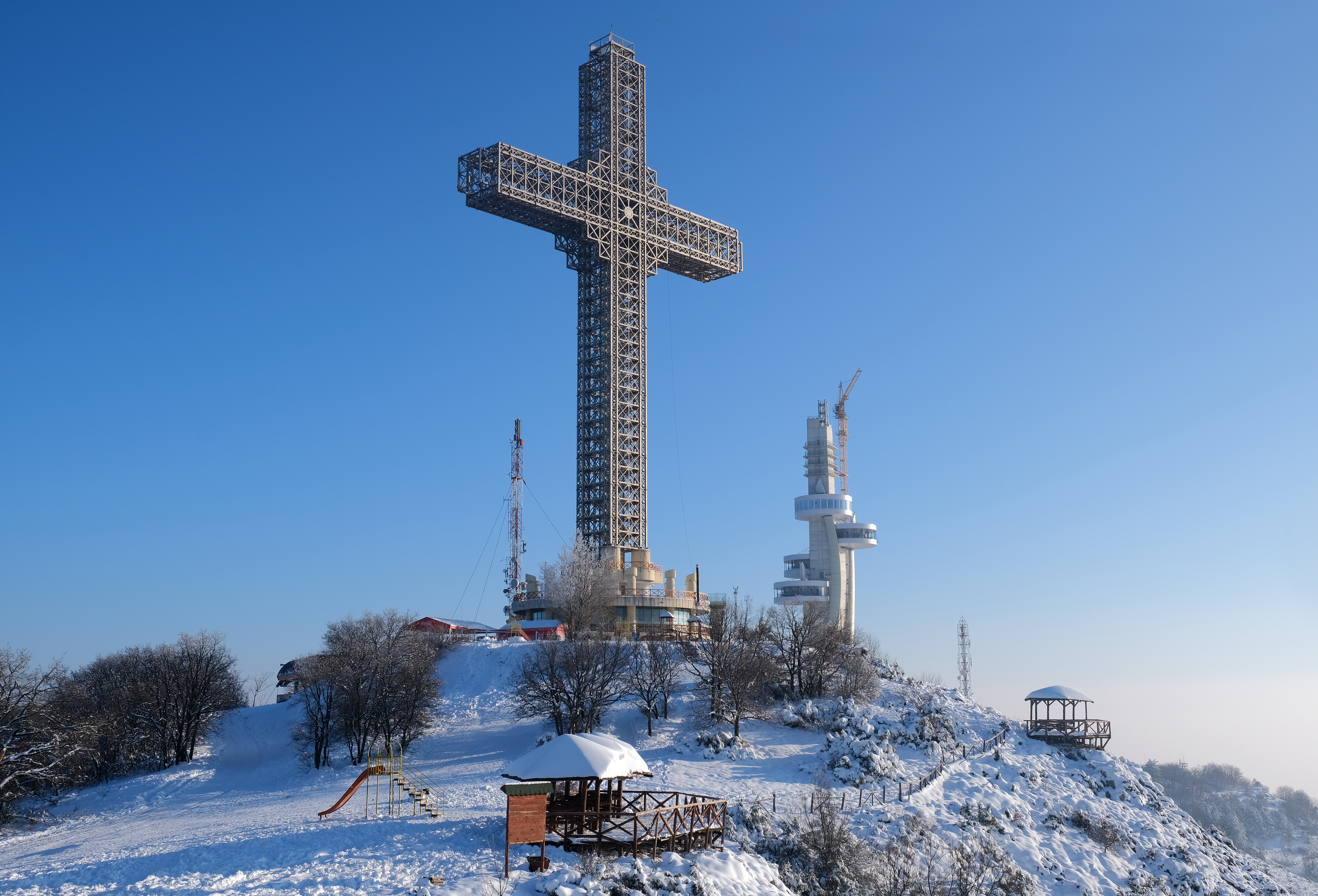
Top of Vodno

=== Millennium Cross Cable Car ===
The Millennium Cross Cable Car (Macedonian: Жичница „Милениумски крст“, in Latin alphabet: Žičnica "Mileniumski krst") is a cableway constructed in 2011 that runs to the 66 metre-high Millennium Cross situated on the top of the Vodno Mountain in Skopje, Republic of North Macedonia.

The cable car does not run on Mondays and the last Tuesday of the month.

==== Construction ====
The ropeway includes 28 regular gondolas for eight persons and two VIP gondolas for four people. The route is 1,750m long, with the ride lasting 6–8 minutes.

The ropeway construction was launched in May 2010 and cost 6.7 million euros, built by Austrian company Doppelmayr.

=== Public opinion and controversy ===
Following the 2001 conflict, the Millennium Cross for the VMRO-DPMNE government served as a political claim on Skopje in the form of a territorial marker "to serve as a reminder to whom the city belongs". The Millennium Cross has become a symbol highlighting the Macedonian presence in Skopje through differentiation along with political and religious distinction. For Macedonian nationalists of any political affiliation, the Millennium Cross is an important political and national symbol. The construction of the cross was also an assertion of a 1000-year Macedonian autocephaly aimed against the Serbian Orthodox Church that did not recognise an independent Macedonian Orthodox Church. The monument was constructed without any public consultation or taking into account sensitivities and differences, as the Millennium Cross promoted one religion. It was a prominent act of de-secularisation by the government as it placed itself in a role of promoting religion by installing a faith based symbol in an important public location.

The cross has come under criticism from non-governmental organisations regarding actions taken by the government that increased tensions among various religions in North Macedonia. Separate to the Macedonians, all other ethnic groups in North Macedonia view the cross as an impediment toward managing cultural diversity and as a monument of fundamentalism that is provocative to non-Christians. Albanians and other Muslim groups of North Macedonia mostly resent the monument and view it as a political declaration by Macedonians that the capital city belongs to them only. In North Macedonia, Muslims perceive the monument as aimed against their communities. Debates over the monument in the context of multiculturalism and Muslim equality have deepened divisions among members of various faiths in North Macedonia.

== See also ==
- List of tallest structures
