= Baskinta =

Baskinta بسكنتا
- Town
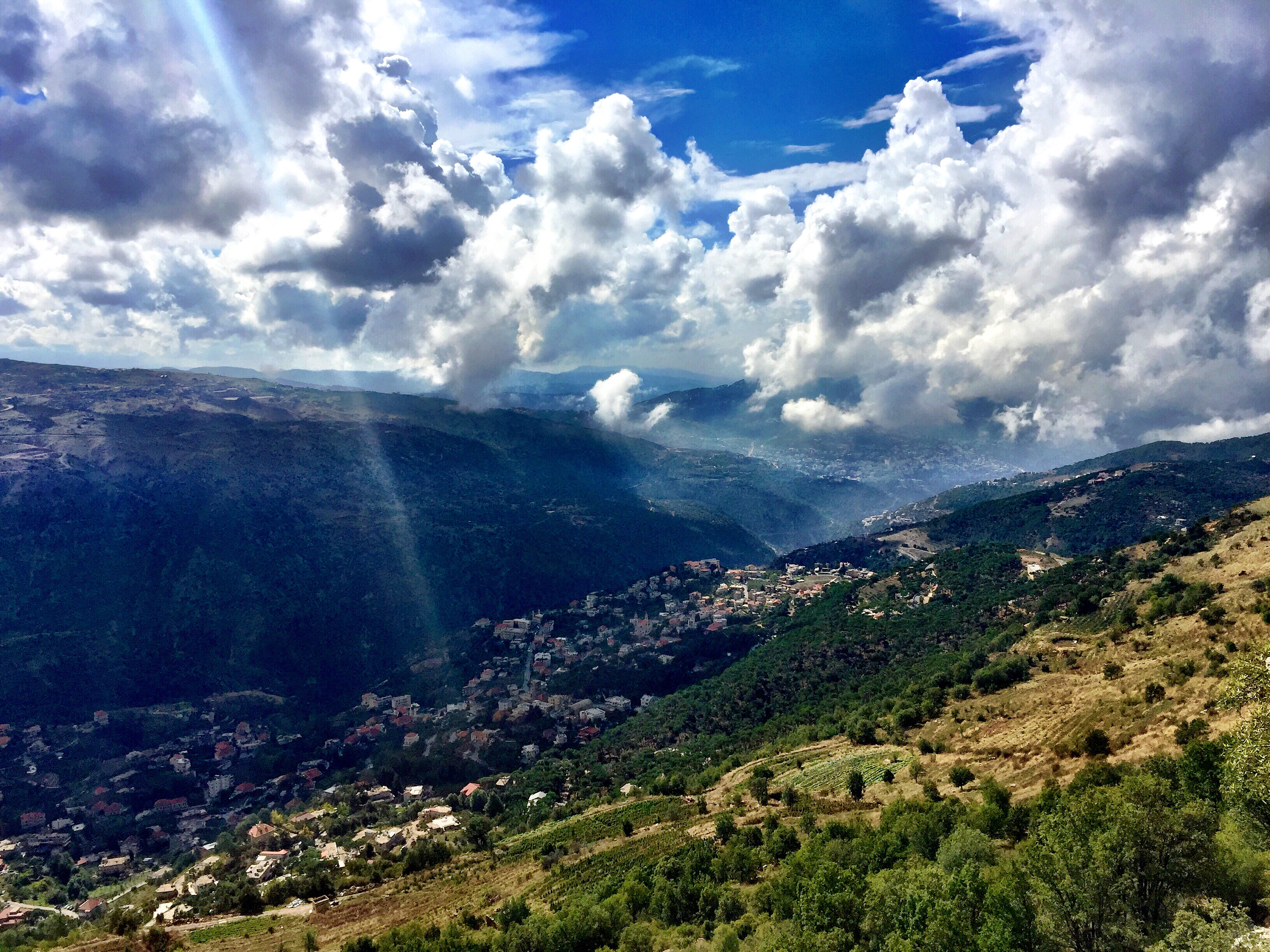
- Baskinta

- Location within Lebanon
- Coordinates: 33°57′N 35°47′E
- Country: Lebanon
- Governorate: Mount Lebanon Governorate
- District: Matn District
- Elevation: 1,300 m (4,300 ft)
- Highest elevation: 1,800 m (5,900 ft)
- Lowest elevation: 1,200 m (3,900 ft)
- Time zone: UTC+2 (EET)
  - Summer (DST): UTC+3 (EEST)
- Dialing code: +961

Baskinta (Arabic: بسكنتا) is a Lebanese village situated at an altitude ranging from 1250 metres above sea level and climbs up to approximately 1800 meters of height at Qanat Bakish, making it one of the highest villages of Lebanon. It is located 43 kilometers north east of Beirut.

Baskinta is known for its natural environment and moderate climate. Baskinta is becoming a cycling spot for mountain biking amateurs with some off-road trails and a developed cycling community. It was also the capital city of the Syriac Christian state of Marada. Baskinta is also known for the variety of its fruit especially apples and vineyards. The residents are Christians: 70% Maronites and 30% Greek Orthodox. There are 15,000 residents in Baskinta and 3 schools: the Saint Pierre College Brothers, the Official High School of Baskinta and the Saint Vincent School.

== History ==
Baskinta and the surrounding areas contain the ruins of monuments, cemeteries, and pottery remains dating back to Phoenicia and Ancient Greece. The Greeks built several palaces there, of which enormous stones, pillars, and underground passages still exist. The temple in the place known as Qanat Bakish was originally dedicated to Bacchus, the Greek god of merriment and wine. The Faqra temple ruins dedicated to Adonis and Atargatis are also found 11 kilometers north of Baskinta near Mzaar Kfardebian, the largest ski resort in the Middle East.

Gold coins and jewels that belonged to Empress Helena (Saint Helen of Constantinople (c. 250 – c. 330), mother of Constantine the Great), have been found in the area. The Cross of All Nations was built in Baskinta to commemorate Saint Helen's pilgrimage.

Baskinta is also the native village of Mikhail Naimy, one of Lebanon's greatest thinkers and literary figures known for his spiritual writings, notably “The Book of Mirdad”. A poet, novelist and philosopher, Naimy co-founded, along with Khalil Gibran and others, the New York literary society known as the Pen League. He personified Baskinta's natural scenarios in most of his writings. It was here in a hut surrounded by extraordinary rock formations that Naimeh drafted much of his monumental work.

The family home of award-winning novelist and journalist Amin Maalouf at Ain el Qabou is near Baskinta, where his novel "The Rock of Tanios" is also set.

The Baskinta Literary Trail, a 24-kilometer hiking path, offers hikers a chance to discover 22 literary landmarks related to several acclaimed Lebanese literary figures from the area.

== Location ==
In addition to its ruins, there are hotels, and chalets sought by skiers. Baskinta lies ahead of Mzaar Kfardebian, and at the foot of Mount Sannine. The name Baskinta means "the abode, the residence, and the place" according to the Syriac Etymology. This traditional summer resort has views of the surrounding mountains. From Beirut head north toward Antelias, about a 12 km drive before you turn east to drive uphill towards Bikfaya, passing through Bteghrine towards Baskinta.

From Baskinta it is possible to climb to the 2,628-meter summit of Mount Sannine, starting off at Nabaa Sannine, a village 7 km up the mountain.

== Climate ==
Baskinta has a Hot-summer mediterranean climate (Csa).

Climate data for Baskinta
Month	Jan	Feb	Mar	Apr	May	Jun	Jul	Aug	Sep	Oct	Nov	Dec	Year
Mean daily maximum °C (°F)	8.2 (46.8)	8.7 (47.7)	11.6 (52.9)	16.1 (61.0)	20.3 (68.5)	24.7 (76.5)	26.5 (79.7)	27.6 (81.7)	25.0 (77.0)	21.3 (70.3)	16.1 (61.0)	10.5 (50.9)	18.1 (64.5)
Daily mean °C (°F)	4.7 (40.5)	5.0 (41.0)	7.4 (45.3)	11.4 (52.5)	15.2 (59.4)	19.4 (66.9)	21.2 (70.2)	22.3 (72.1)	19.6 (67.3)	16.3 (61.3)	11.8 (53.2)	6.9 (44.4)	13.4 (56.2)
Mean daily minimum °C (°F)	1.2 (34.2)	1.4 (34.5)	3.3 (37.9)	6.7 (44.1)	10.1 (50.2)	14.1 (57.4)	15.9 (60.6)	17.0 (62.6)	14.2 (57.6)	11.3 (52.3)	7.5 (45.5)	3.4 (38.1)	8.8 (47.9)
Average precipitation mm (inches)	270 (10.6)	234 (9.2)	205 (8.1)	86 (3.4)	34 (1.3)	2 (0.1)	1 (0.0)	1 (0.0)	6 (0.2)	39 (1.5)	119 (4.7)	221 (8.7)	1,218 (47.8)
Source: Climate-Data.org

== Demographics ==
In 2014, Christians made up 98.98% of registered voters in Baskinta. 65.45% of the voters were Maronite Catholics, 27.08% were Greek Orthodox and 3.95% were Greek Catholics.

== Notable people ==
- Mikhail Naimy- writer and novelist.
- Amin Maalouf- award-winning novelist.
- Georges Hobeika- Haute couture fashion designer.
- Bethany Kehdy- culinary expert and cookbook author.

== See also ==
- Cross of All Nations
- Mount Sannine
