= Cross of All Nations =

Monumental cross located in Baskinta, Lebanon

Coordinates: 33°57′56″N 35°49′41″E

- صليب كل الشعوب
- Interactive map of Cross of All Nations
- Location: Baskinta, Lebanon
- Material: Steel, concrete
- Width: 37 m (121 ft)
- Height: 73.8 m (242 ft)
- Beginning date: 25 November 2008
- Completion date: 27 June 2010
- Opening date: 13 September 2010
- Dedicated to: Commemorate the Feast of the Exaltation of the Cross

The Cross of All Nations is a monumental cross located in Qanat Bakish, a locality close to the Lebanese town of Baskinta. The cross was built near a church dating back to 1898 on a land belonging to the Lebanese Maronite Order. At 73.8 metres (242 ft) tall, the Cross of All Nations is the largest illuminated cross in the world, it was inaugurated on September 13, 2010 on the eve of the Feast of the Exaltation of the Cross. It was built by the Maronite Church and an organization of French Catholics the "Association Terre de Dieu" led by the brothers Jesus and Francois Ibanez..

== Context ==
The Feast of the Exaltation of the Cross commemorates the discovery of the Cross of Christ by St. Helen, the mother of Roman emperor Constantine, on September 14, 326. In Lebanon the feast is celebrated each year in Christian towns and cities with crowded processions during which people carry torches and visit mountain tops where they plant crosses, hold prayer services and start bonfires.

== Description ==
The cross is 73.8 metres (242 ft) tall (one tenth the height of mount Golgotha) and 37 metres (121 ft) wide. The cross's 8 metres (26 ft) deep base contains 500 cubic meters of concrete and 5 tons of steel, the cross's body itself is made up of 170 tons of steel and is lit by 1800 spotlights. Work on the monument started on 25 November 2008 and was done on 27 June 2010 and cost around 1.5 million USD mainly acquired through donations. The cross is equipped with one ladder that allow visitors to access a 300 square metres (3,200 sq ft) platform located at its vertical beam.
