= John Denham Parsons =

- Born: 1861; South Stoneham, Hampshire, England
- Died: 14 September 1936 (aged 74–75)
- Occupation: Writer

John Denham Parsons (1861 – 14 September 1936) was an English writer and Shakespeare authorship theorist.

== Biography ==
Parsons was a proponent of the Baconian theory of Shakespeare authorship. Between 1918 and 1935 he published many works on this topic, including articles in Baconiana and letters in the correspondence columns of Notes and Queries and The Times Literary Supplement. He attempted pamphlet controversy with Sir Sidney Lee and authorities at the British Museum over the Shakespeare authorship question.

Parsons' book The Non-Christian Cross (1896) argued that the Christian cross symbol is not Christian in origin.

He was a member of the Society for Psychical Research. Parsons authored a 561-page book The Nature and Purpose of the Universe on philosophy and psychical research, published in 1906.

== Selected publications ==
- Our Sun-God: Or Christianity Before Christ, 1895
- The Non-Christian Cross: An Enquiry into the Origin and History of the Symbol Eventually Adopted as That of Our Religion, 1896
- The Nature and Purpose of the Universe, 1906
- The Great Taboo in English Literary Circles, 1919
- Ben Johnson and Sir Sidney Lee, 1920
- Boycotted Shakespeare Facts: Being a Preliminary Report Upon the Admissible, 1920
- William Shakespeare, 1920
- Bacon: Being an account of seven years of refusal by the accepted authorities to supply a reasoned judgement concerning certain new evidence affecting.. the identity of the poet Shakespeare, 1922
- The British Museum and Shakespeare's identity, 1924
- Did "Shake-speare" signal?
