= Christian cross =

Symbol of Christianity

A typical Latin cross

A typical Greek Cross

The Christian cross, representing the crucifixion of Jesus, is a symbol of Christianity. It is related to the crucifix, a cross that includes a corpus (a representation of Jesus's body, usually three-dimensional) and to the more general family of cross symbols. The term cross is now detached from its original specifically Christian meaning, in modern English and many other Western languages. (Note: The Old English (10th century) cros refers to the instrument of Christ's crucifixion, specifically replacing the native Old English word rood, ultimately from the Latin crux (or its accusative crucem and its genitive crucis), "stake, gibbet; cross". The English verb to cross arises from the noun c. 1200, first in the sense "to make the sign of the cross"; the generic meaning "to intersect" develops in the 15th century.)

The basic forms of the cross are the Latin cross with unequal arms and the Greek cross with equal arms; there are numerous variants, partly with confessional significance—such as the tau cross, the double-barred cross, triple-barred cross, and cross-and-crosslets—and many heraldic variants, such as the cross potent, cross pattée, and cross moline, cross fleury.

== Pre-Christian symbolism ==
A related symbol was used long before the Christian era in the form of the ancient Egyptian ankh.

In ancient Persia, symbolic designs representing the four elements—earth, water, fire, and air - were closely tied to Zoroastrian philosophy. The tombs of ancient Persian kings, including Darius the Great, built around five hundred years before Christ, were constructed in this way.

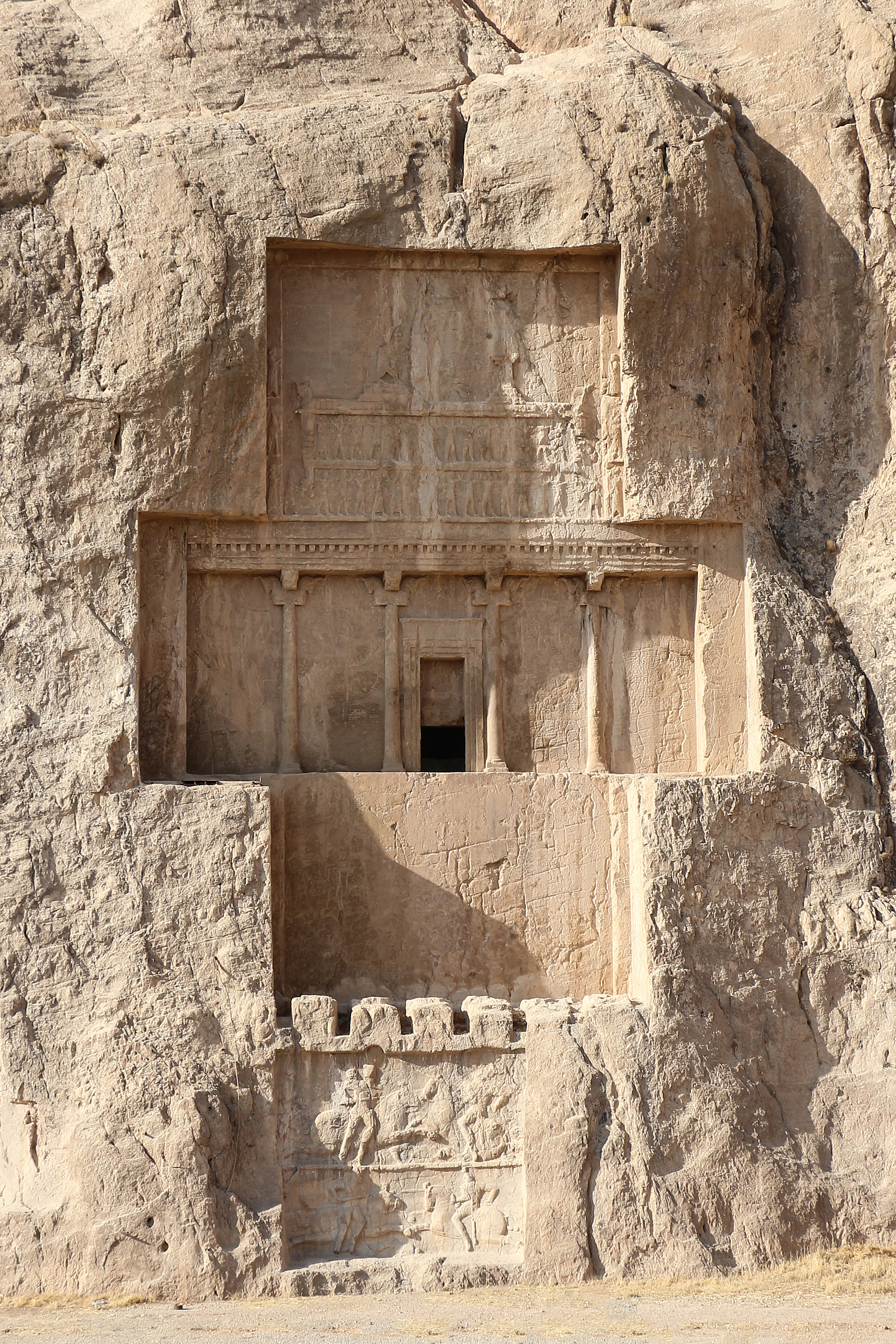
Tomb of Darius the Great

== Instrument of Jesus's execution ==
John Pearson, Bishop of Chester (c. 1660) wrote in his commentary on the Apostles' Creed that the Greek word stauros originally signified "a straight standing Stake, Pale, or Palisador," but that, "when other transverse or prominent parts were added in a perfect Cross, it retained still the Original Name," and he declared: "The Form then of the Cross on which our Saviour suffered was not a simple, but a compounded, Figure, according to the Custom of the Romans, by whose Procurator he was condemned to die. In which there was not only a straight and erected piece of Wood fixed in the Earth, but also a transverse Beam fastened unto that towards the top thereof."

Frederick Elworthy claims that for a few centuries the emblem of Christ was a headless T-shaped tau cross rather than a Latin cross.

== Early Christian usage ==
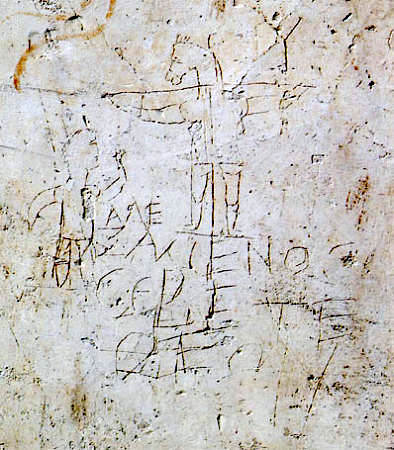
The Alexamenos graffito

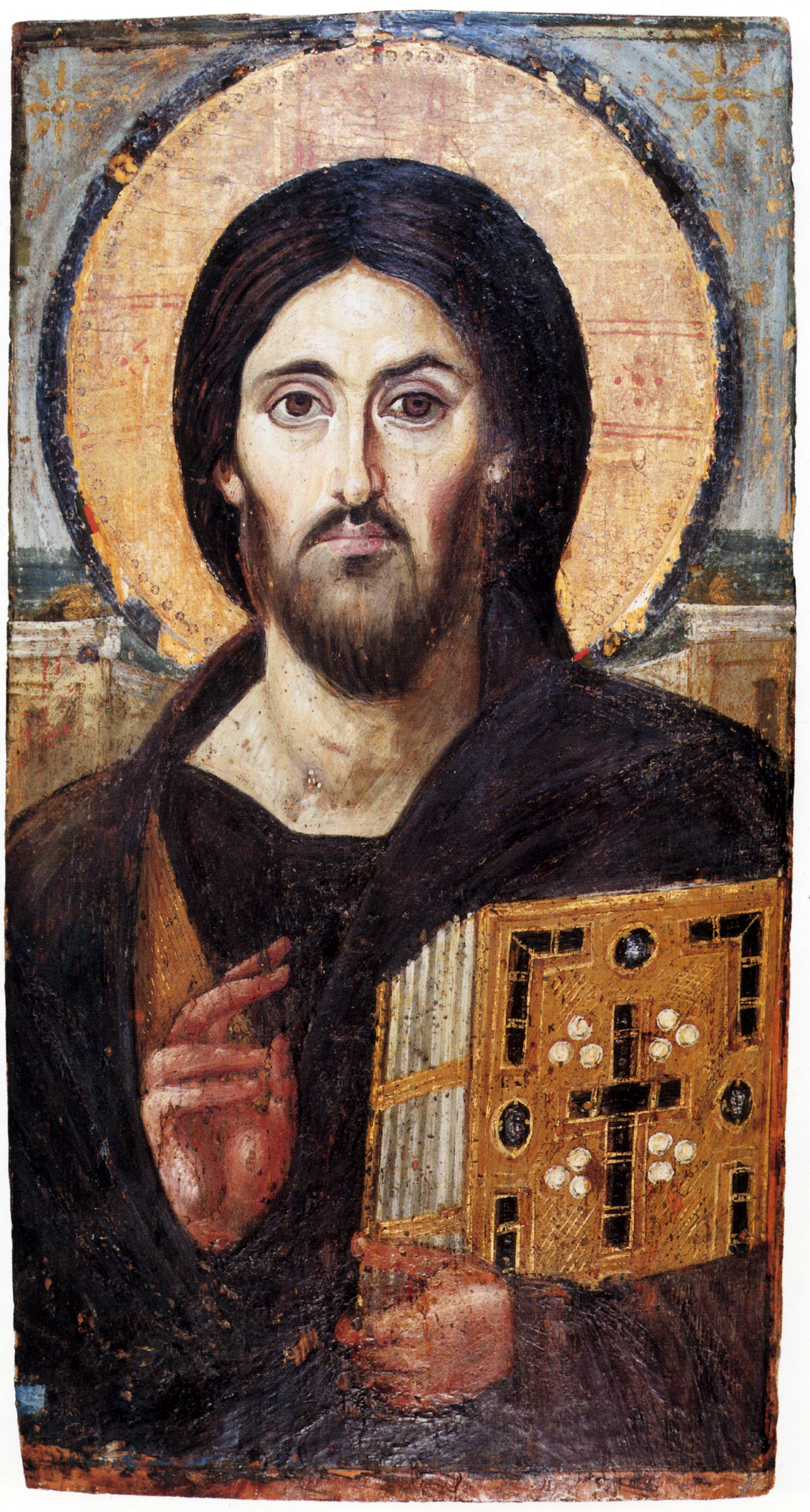
The Sinai icon of Christ Pantocrator (6th century), showing Christ with a cruciform halo and holding a book adorned with a crux gemmata

There are few extant examples of the cross in 2nd century Christian iconography. It has been argued that Christians were reluctant to use it as it depicts a purposely painful and gruesome method of public execution. A symbol similar to the cross, the staurogram, was used to abbreviate the Greek word for cross in very early New Testament manuscripts such as P66, P45 and P75, almost like a nomen sacrum. The extensive adoption of the cross as a Christian iconographic symbol arose from the 4th century.

However, the cross symbol was already associated with Christians in the 2nd century, as is indicated in the anti-Christian arguments cited in the Octavius of Minucius Felix, chapters IX (9) and XXIX,(29) written at the end of that century or the beginning of the next, (Note: Minucius Felix speaks of the cross of Jesus in its familiar form, likening it to objects with a crossbeam or to a man with arms outstretched in prayer.) and by the fact that by the early 3rd century the cross had become so closely associated with Christ that Clement of Alexandria, who died between 211 and 216, could without fear of ambiguity use the phrase τὸ κυριακὸν σημεῖον (the Lord's sign) to mean the cross, when he repeated the idea, current as early as the apocryphal Epistle of Barnabas, that the number 318 (in Greek numerals, ΤΙΗ) in Genesis 14:14 was interpreted as a foreshadowing (a "type") of the cross (T, an upright with crossbar, standing for 300) and of Jesus (ΙΗ, the first two letters of his name ΙΗΣΟΥΣ, standing for 18). His contemporary Tertullian rejected the accusation of Christians being "adorers of the gibbet" (crucis religiosi). (Note: Tertullian rejects the accusation that Christians are crucis religiosi (i.e. "adorers of the gibbet"), and returns the accusation by likening the worship of pagan idols to the worship of poles or stakes. "Then, if any of you think we render superstitious adoration to the cross, in that adoration he is sharer with us. If you offer homage to a piece of wood at all, it matters little what it is like when the substance is the same: it is of no consequence the form, if you have the very body of the god. And yet how far does the Athenian Pallas differ from the stock of the cross, or the Pharian Ceres as she is put up uncarved to sale, a mere rough stake and piece of shapeless wood? Every stake fixed in an upright position is a portion of the cross; we render our adoration, if you will have it so, to a god entire and complete. We have shown before that your deities are derived from shapes modelled from the cross." [Original Latin: "Sed et qui crucis nos religiosos putat, consecraneus noster erit. Cum lignum aliquod propitiatur, viderit habitus, dum materiae qualitas eadem sit; viderit forma, dum id ipsum dei corpus sit. Et tamen quanto distinguitur a crucis stipite Pallas Attica, et Ceres Pharia, quae sine effigie rudi palo et informi ligno prostat? Pars crucis est omne robur, quod erecta statione defigitur; nos, si forte, integrum et totum deum colimus. Diximus originem deorum vestrorum a plastis de cruce induci.") In his book De Corona, written in 204, Tertullian tells how it was already a tradition for Christians to trace repeatedly on their foreheads the sign of the cross. (Note: "At every forward step and movement, at every going in and out, when we put on our clothes and shoes, when we bathe, when we sit at table, when we light the lamps, on couch, on seat, in all the ordinary actions of daily life, we trace upon the forehead the sign".) The crucifix, a cross upon which an image of Christ is present, is not known to have been used until the 6th century AD.

The oldest extant depiction of the execution of Jesus in any medium seems to be the second-century or early third-century relief on a jasper gemstone meant for use as an amulet, which is now in the British Museum in London. It portrays a naked bearded man whose arms are tied at the wrists by short strips to the transom of a T-shaped cross. An inscription in Greek on the obverse contains an invocation of the redeeming crucified Christ. On the reverse a later inscription by a different hand combines magical formulae with Christian terms. The catalogue of a 2007 exhibition says: "The appearance of the Crucifixion on a gem of such an early date suggests that pictures of the subject (now lost) may have been widespread even in the late second or early third century, most likely in conventional Christian contexts".

The Jewish Encyclopedia says:

The cross as a Christian symbol or "seal" came into use at least as early as the second century (see "Apost. Const." iii. 17; Epistle of Barnabas, xi.-xii.; Justin, "Apologia," i. 55–60; "Dial. cum Tryph." 85–97); and the marking of a cross upon the forehead and the chest was regarded as a talisman against the powers of demons (Tertullian, "De Corona," iii.; Cyprian, "Testimonies," xi. 21–22; Lactantius, "Divinæ Institutiones," iv. 27, and elsewhere). Accordingly the Christian Fathers had to defend themselves, as early as the second century, against the charge of being worshipers of the cross, as may be learned from Tertullian, "Apologia," xii., xvii., and Minucius Felix, "Octavius," xxix. Christians used to swear by the power of the cross[.]

== In contemporary Christianity ==
In Christianity, communicants of the Oriental Orthodox and Eastern Orthodox Churches are expected to wear a cross necklace at all times; these are ordinarily given to believers at their baptism.

Many Christians, such as those in the tradition of the Church of the East, continue the practice of hanging a Christian cross in their homes, often on the east wall. Crosses or crucifixes are often the centre of a Christian family's home altar as well.

Catholics, Eastern Orthodox, Oriental Orthodox, members of the major branches of Christianity with other adherents as Lutheranism and Anglicans, and others often make the Sign of the Cross upon themselves. This was already a common Christian practice in the time of Tertullian.

The Feast of the Cross is an important Christian feast. One of the twelve Great Feasts in Eastern Orthodoxy is the Exaltation of the Cross on September 14, which commemorates the consecration of the basilica on the site where the original cross of Jesus was reportedly discovered in 326 by Helena of Constantinople, mother of Constantine the Great. The Catholic Church celebrates the feast on the same day and under the same name (In Exaltatione Sanctae Crucis), though in English it has been called the feast of the Triumph of the Cross.

Roman Catholic, Eastern Orthodox, Lutheran and Anglican bishops place a cross (+) before their name when signing a document. The dagger symbol (†) placed after the name of a dead person (often with the date of death) is sometimes taken to be a Christian cross.

In many Christian traditions, such as the Methodist Churches, the altar cross sits atop or is suspended above the altar table and is a focal point of the chancel.

In many Baptist churches, a large cross hangs above the baptistry.

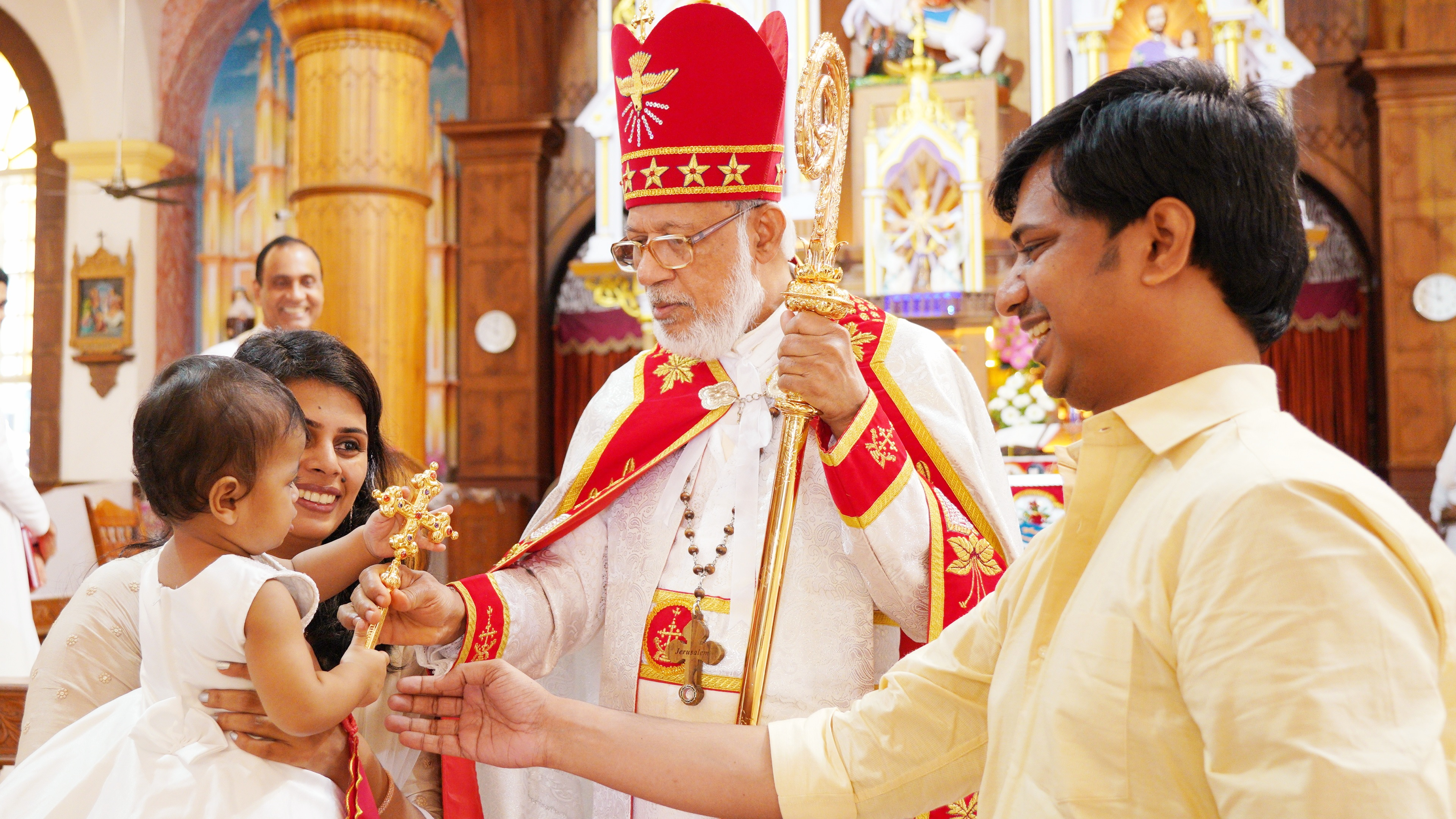
An Eastern Catholic Syro-Malabar Major Archbishop with his blessing cross

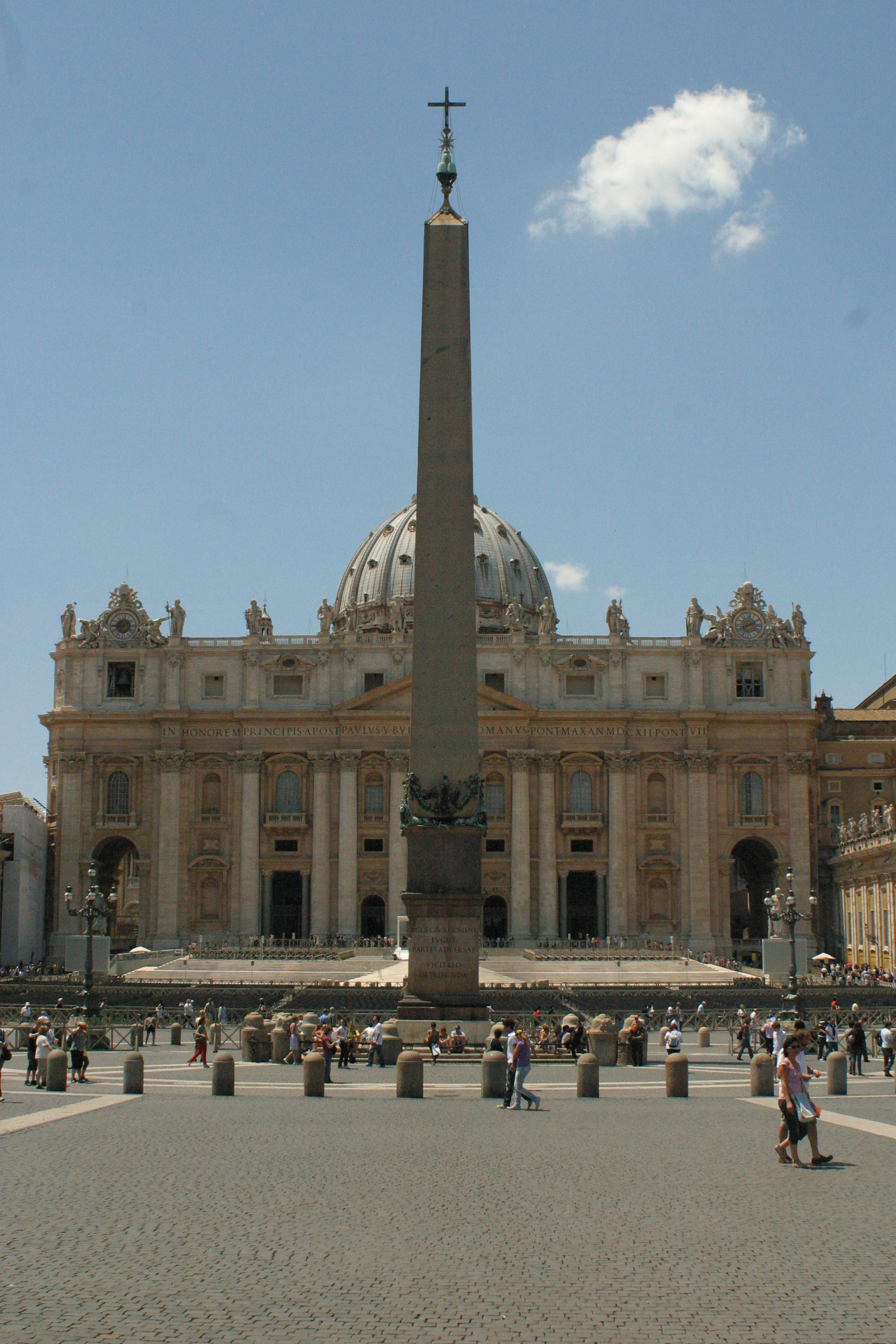
The Vatican Obelisk in Rome

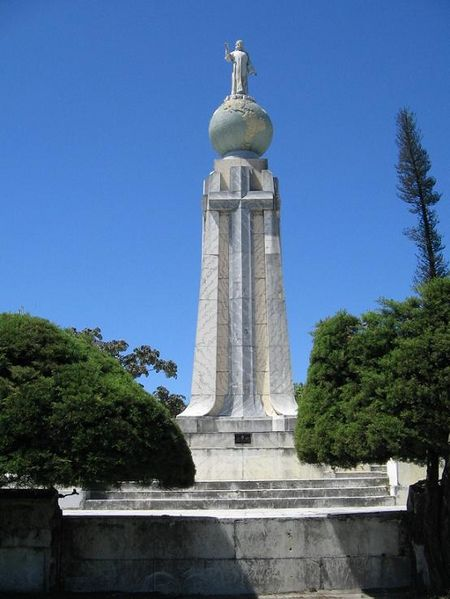
Cross on each side of the Monumento al Divino Salvador del Mundo pedestal]

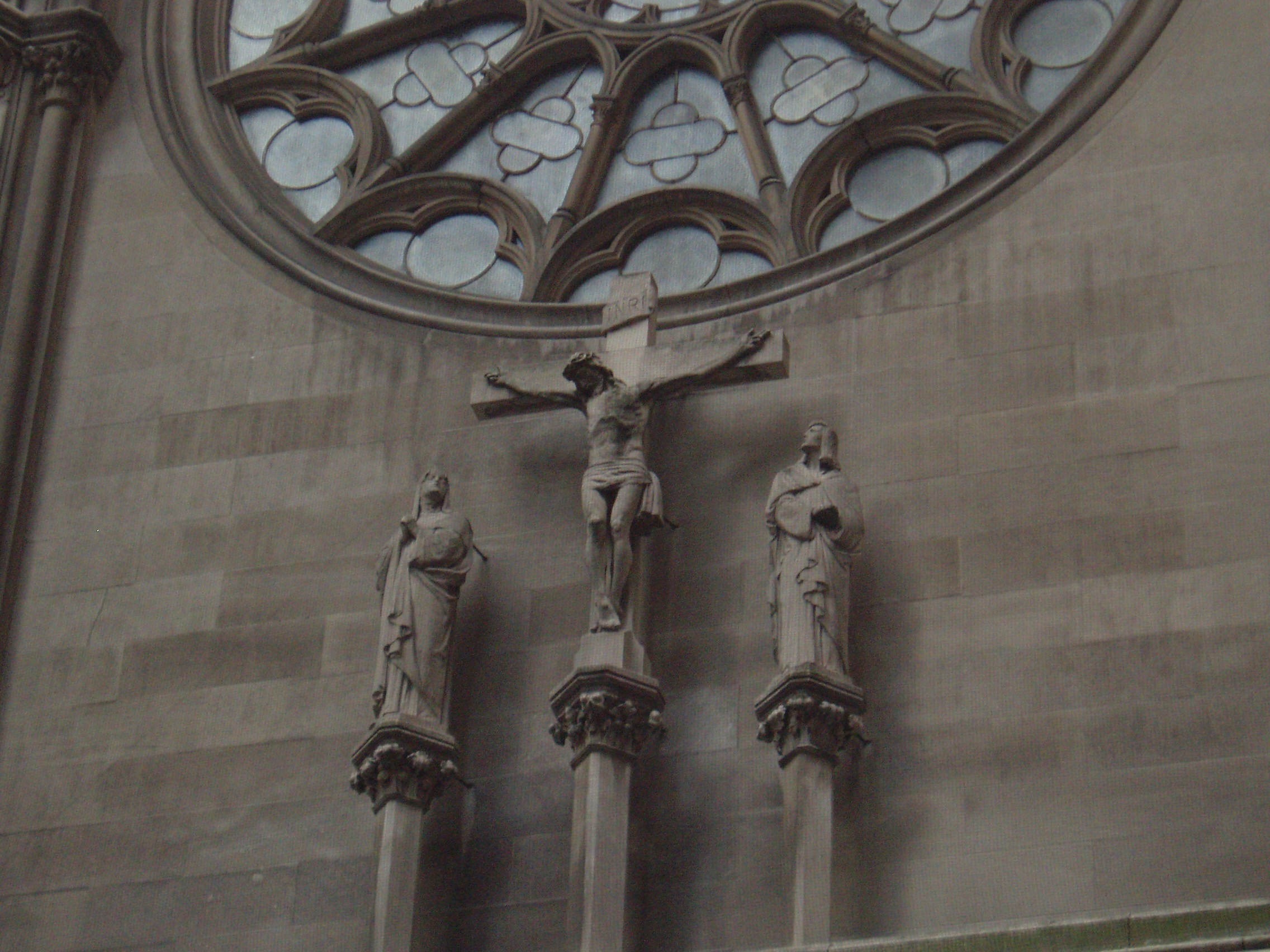
A crucifix on the wall of a church

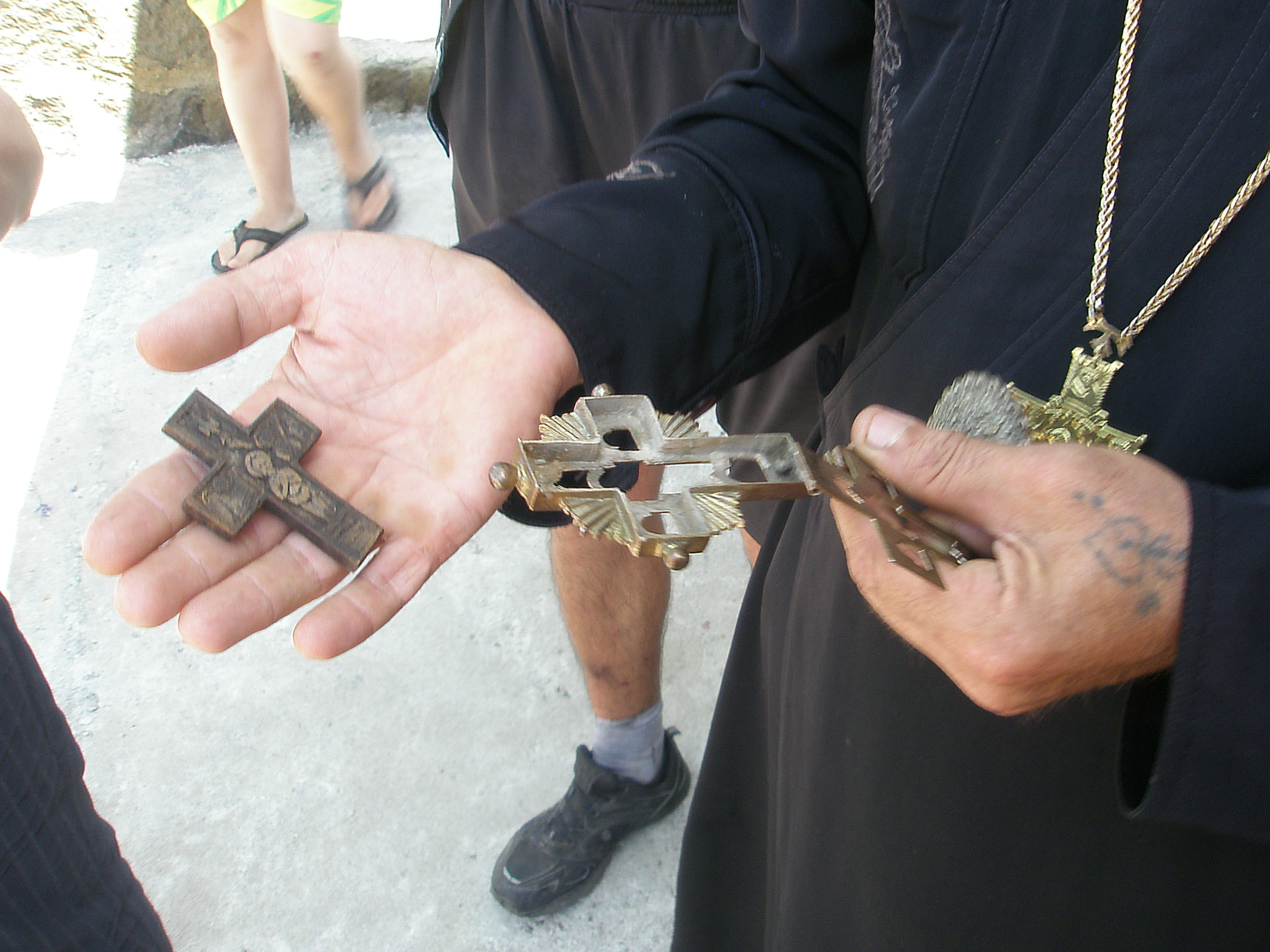
A man holding several Eastern Orthodox pectoral crosses

== Rejection among various religious groups ==
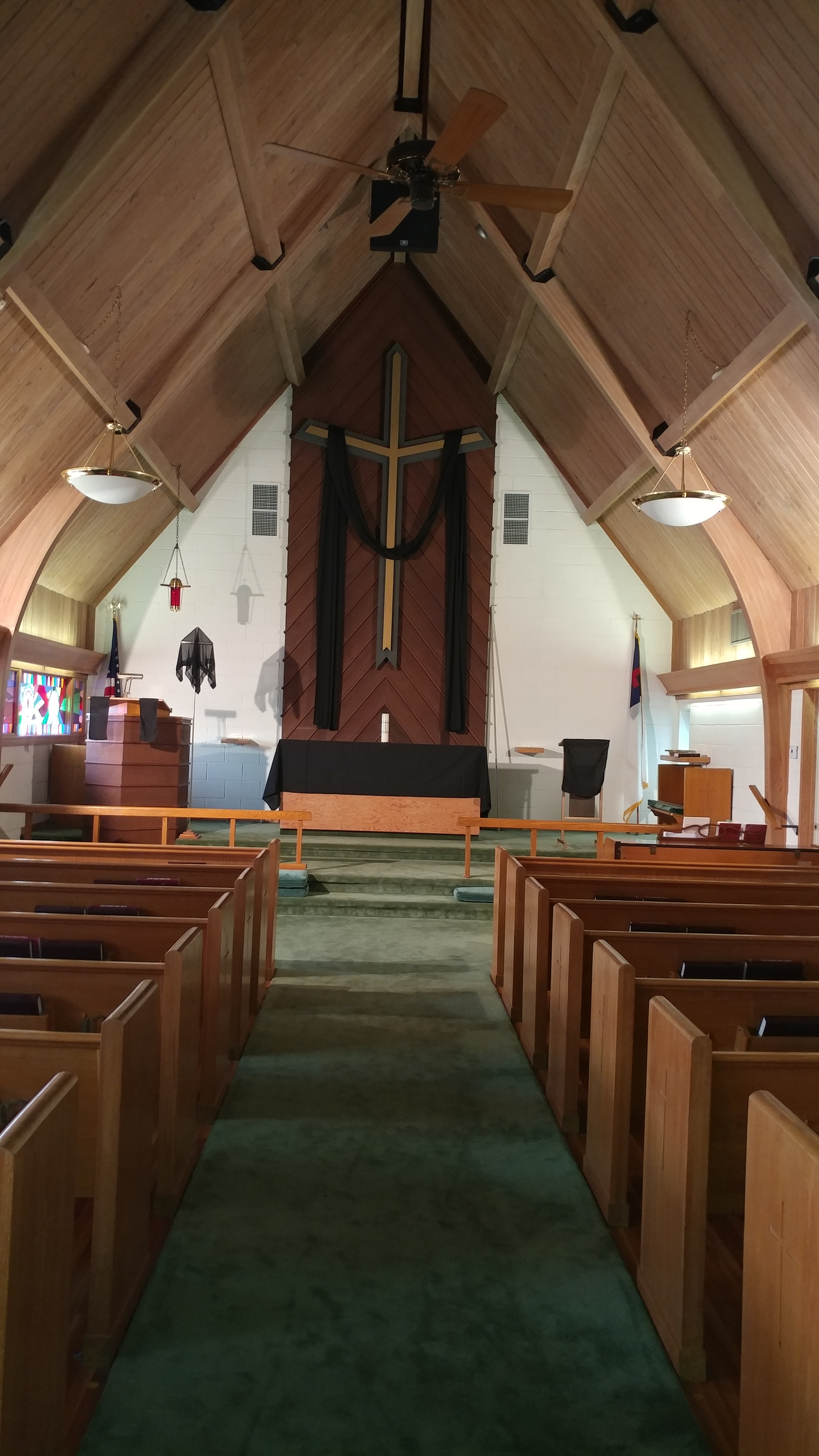
The chancel of this Lutheran church features a very large altar cross.

Although Christians accepted that the cross was the gallows on which Jesus died, (Note: The perhaps 1st-century Epistle of Barnabas sees the letter T as indicating the cross of Christ.) they had already begun in the 2nd century to use it as a Christian symbol. (Note: The Jewish Encyclopedia states: "The cross as a Christian symbol or 'seal' came into use at least as early as the 2nd century (see 'Apost. Const.' iii. 17; Epistle of Barnabas, xi.-xii.; Justin, 'Apologia,' i. 55-60; 'Dial. cum Tryph.' 85-97); and the marking of a cross upon the forehead and the chest was regarded as a talisman against the powers of demons (Tertullian, 'De Corona,' iii.; Cyprian, 'Testimonies,' xi. 21–22; Lactantius, 'Divinæ Institutiones,' iv. 27, and elsewhere). Accordingly the Christian Fathers had to defend themselves, as early as the 2nd century, against the charge of being worshipers of the cross, as may be learned from Tertullian, 'Apologia,' xii., xvii., and Minucius Felix, 'Octavius,' xxix" 9) During the first three centuries of the Christian era the cross was "a symbol of minor importance" when compared to the prominence given to it later, but by the second century it was closely associated with Christians, to the point where Christians were mocked as "adorers of the gibbet" (crucis religiosi), an accusation countered by Tertullian. and it was already a tradition for Christians to trace repeatedly on their foreheads the sign of the cross. Martin Luther at the time of the Reformation retained the cross and crucifix in the Lutheran Church, (Note: "The Calvinizers sought to remove the crucifix as idolatrous. There was considerable continuity, certainly, between the Lutheran use of the crucifix and the Catholic.") which remains an important feature of Lutheran devotion and worship today. Luther wrote: Crux sola est nostra theologia, "The cross alone is our theology."

On the other hand, the Great Iconoclasm was a wave of rejecting sacred images among Calvinists of the 16th century. (Note: "Iconoclastic incidents during the Calvinist 'Second Reformation' in Germany provoked reactive riots by Lutheran mobs, while Protestant image-breaking in the Baltic region deeply antagonized the neighbouring Eastern Orthodox, a group with whom reformers might have hoped to make common cause.") Some localities (such as England) included polemics against using the cross in worship. For example, during the 16th century, theologians in the Anglican and Reformed traditions Nicholas Ridley, James Calfhill, and Theodore Beza, rejected practices that they described as cross worship. Considering it a form of idolatry, there was a dispute in 16th century England over the baptismal use of the sign of the cross and even the public use of crosses. There were more active reactions to religious items that were thought as 'relics of Papacy', as happened for example in September 1641, when Sir Robert Harley pulled down and destroyed the cross at Wigmore. Writers during the 19th century indicating a Pagan origin of the cross included Henry Dana Ward, Mourant Brock, and John Denham Parsons. David Williams, writing of medieval images of monsters, says: "The disembodied phallus is also formed into a cross, which, before it became for Christianity the symbol of salvation, was a pagan symbol of fertility." The study, Gods, Heroes & Kings: The Battle for Mythic Britain states: "Before the fourth century CE, the cross was not widely embraced as a sign of Christianity, symbolizing as it did the gallows of a criminal." This reaction in the Anglican and other Reformed Churches was short-lived and the cross became ubiquitous in these Christian traditions.

Jehovah's Witnesses do not use the symbol of the cross in their worship, which they believe constitutes idolatry. They believe that Jesus died on a single upright torture stake rather than a two-beam cross, arguing that the Greek term stauros indicated a single upright pole. Although early Watch Tower Society publications associated with the Bible Student movement taught that Christ was executed on a cross, it no longer appeared on Watch Tower Society publications after the name Jehovah's witnesses (Note: The word witnesses was not capitalised until the 1970s.) was adopted in 1931, and use of the cross was officially abandoned in 1936.

The Church of Jesus Christ of Latter-day Saints teaches that Jesus died on a cross; however, their prophet Gordon B. Hinckley stated that "for us the cross is the symbol of the dying Christ, while our message is a declaration of the living Christ." When asked what was the symbol of his religion, Hinckley replied "the lives of our people must become the only meaningful expression of our faith and, in fact, therefore, the symbol of our worship." Prophet Howard W. Hunter encouraged Latter-day Saints "to look to the temple of the Lord as the great symbol of your membership." Images of LDS temples and the Angel Moroni (who is found in statue on most temples) are commonly used to symbolize the faith of members of the Church of Jesus Christ of Latter Day Saints. In April 2020, under President Russell M. Nelson, the Church formally adopted an image inspired by Thorvaldsen's Christus statue underlain with the Church's name as an official symbol of the faith.

== Notable individual crosses ==
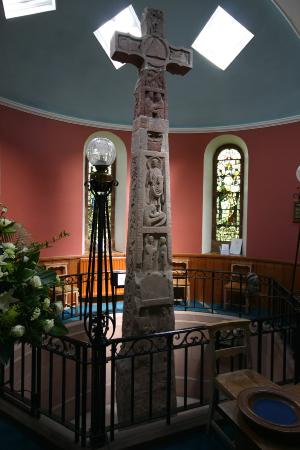
The Ruthwell Cross, a stone Anglo-Saxon cross located in Ruthwell, Dumfriesshire (8th century)

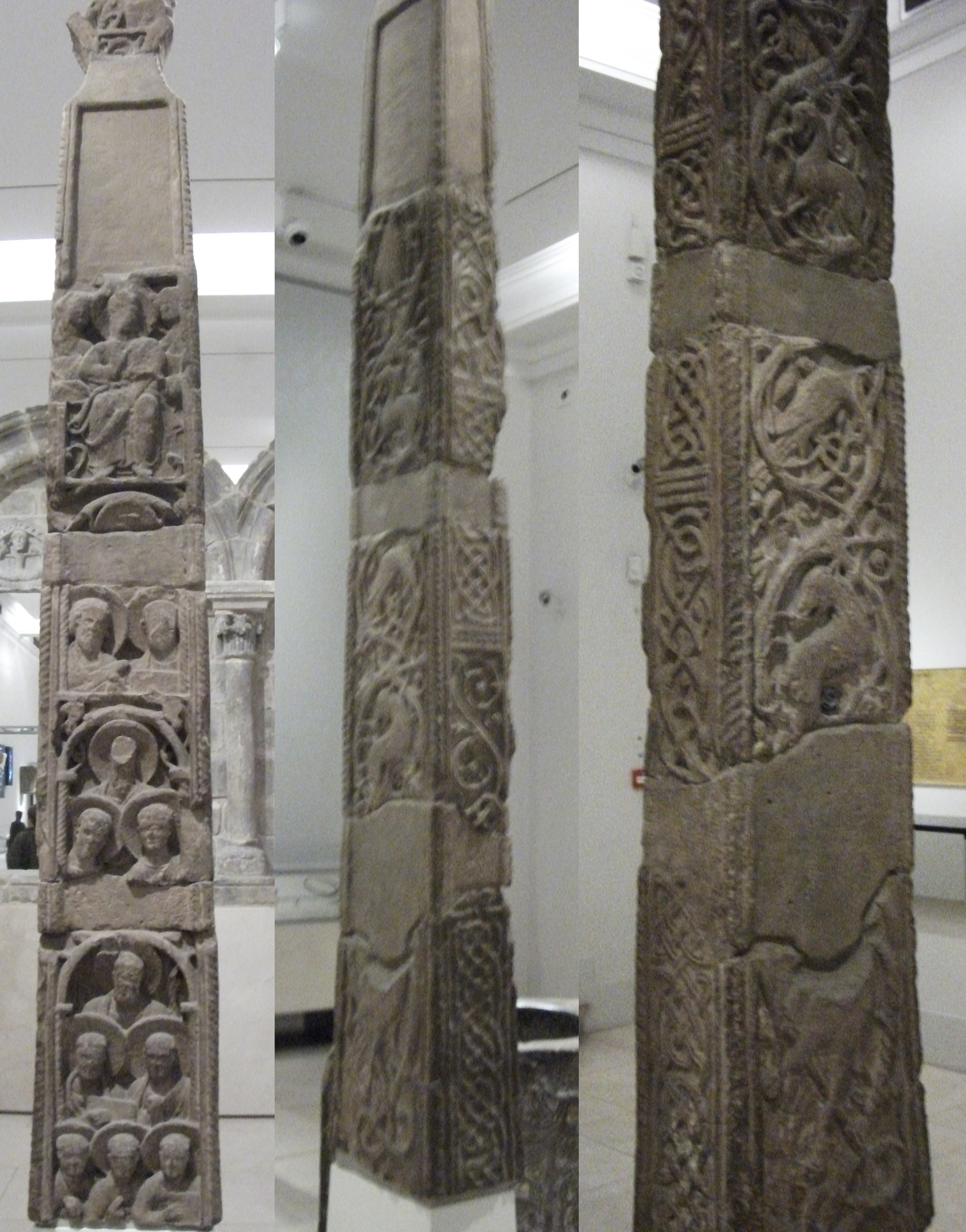
Easby Cross (9th century)

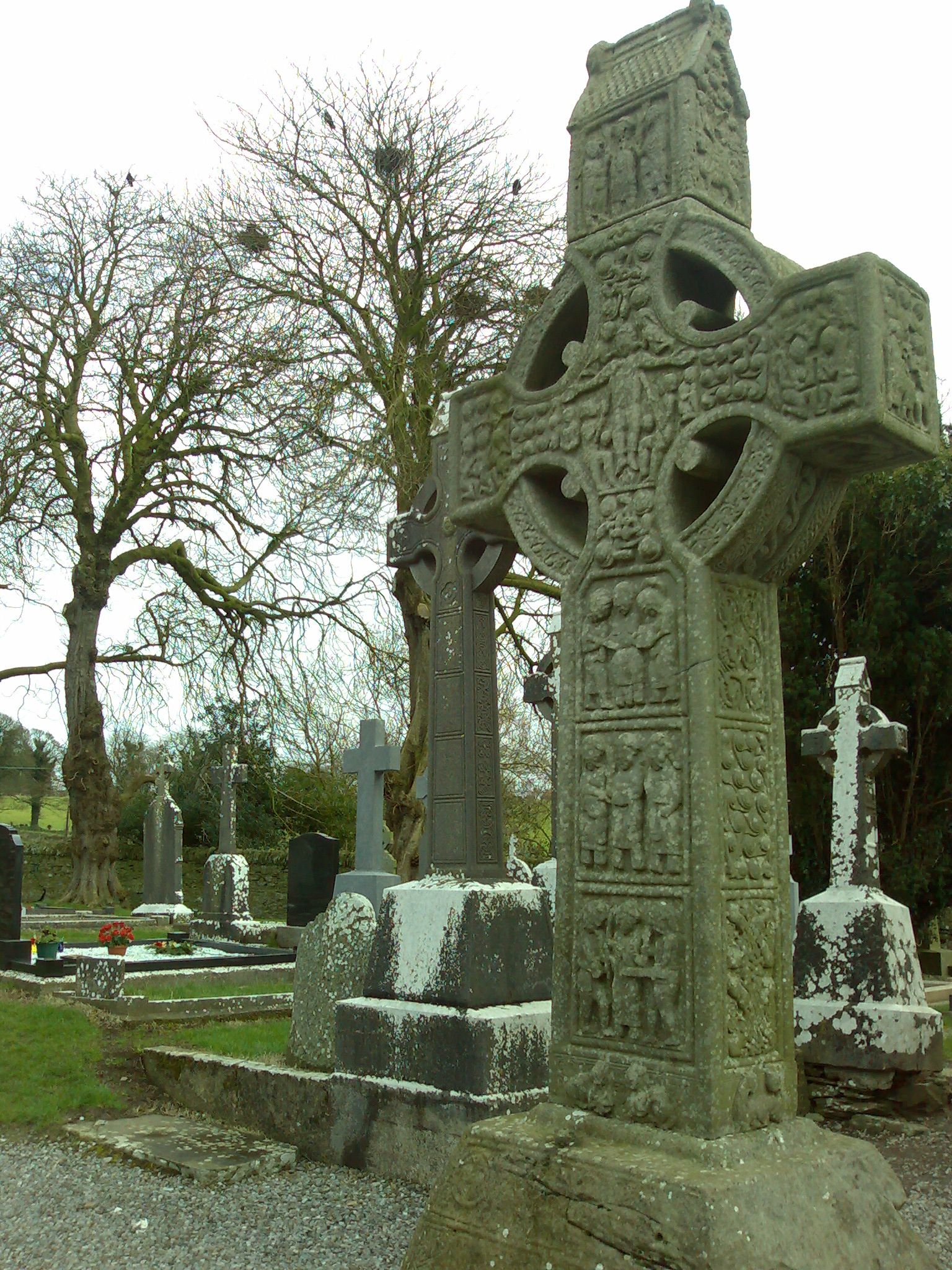
Muiredach's High Cross (10th century)

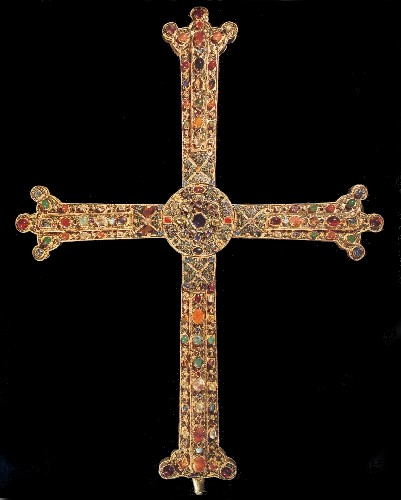
Victory Cross, Cathedral of San Salvador of Oviedo (10th century)

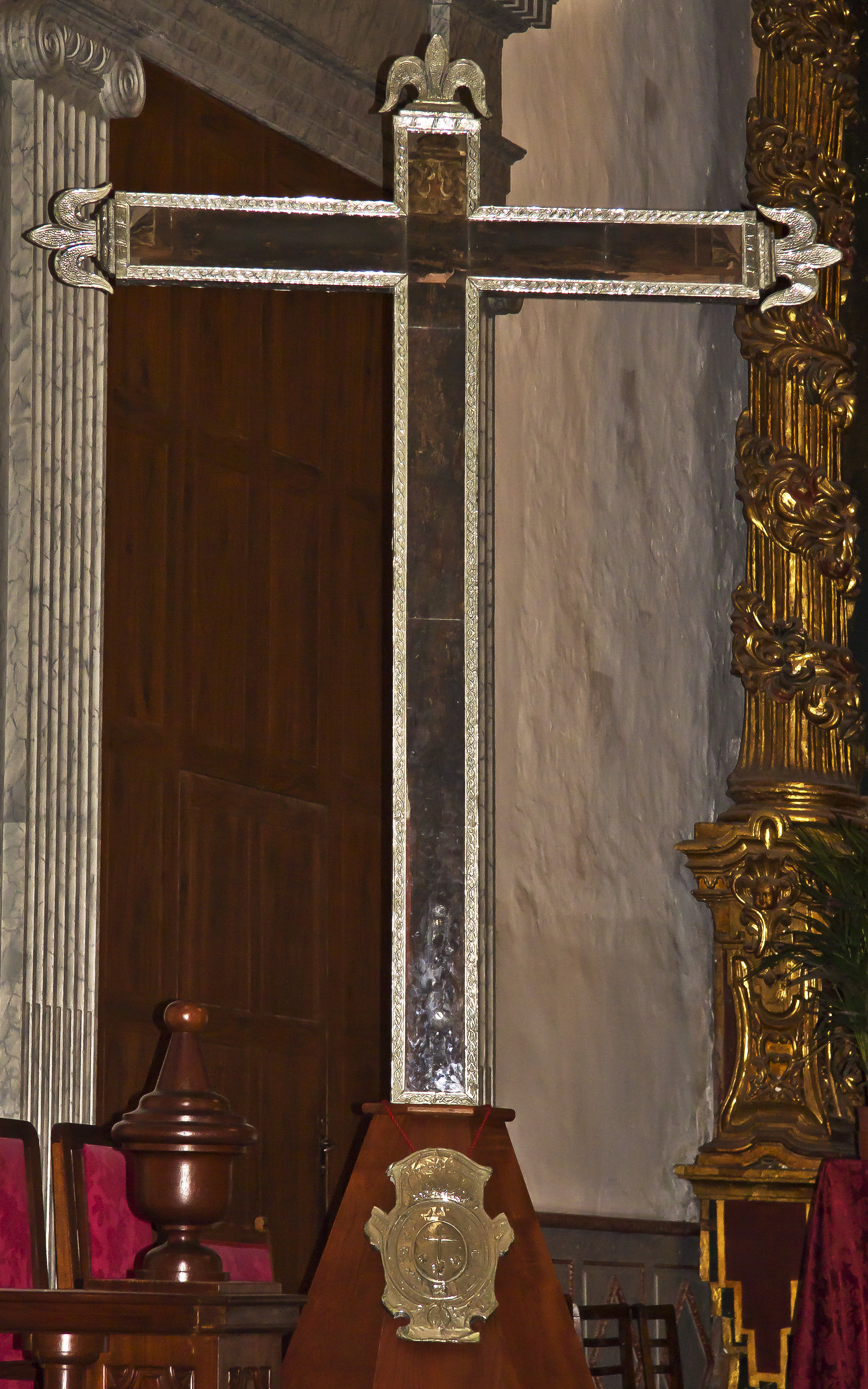
Holly Cross with which the city of Santa Cruz de Tenerife was founded in Spain (1496).

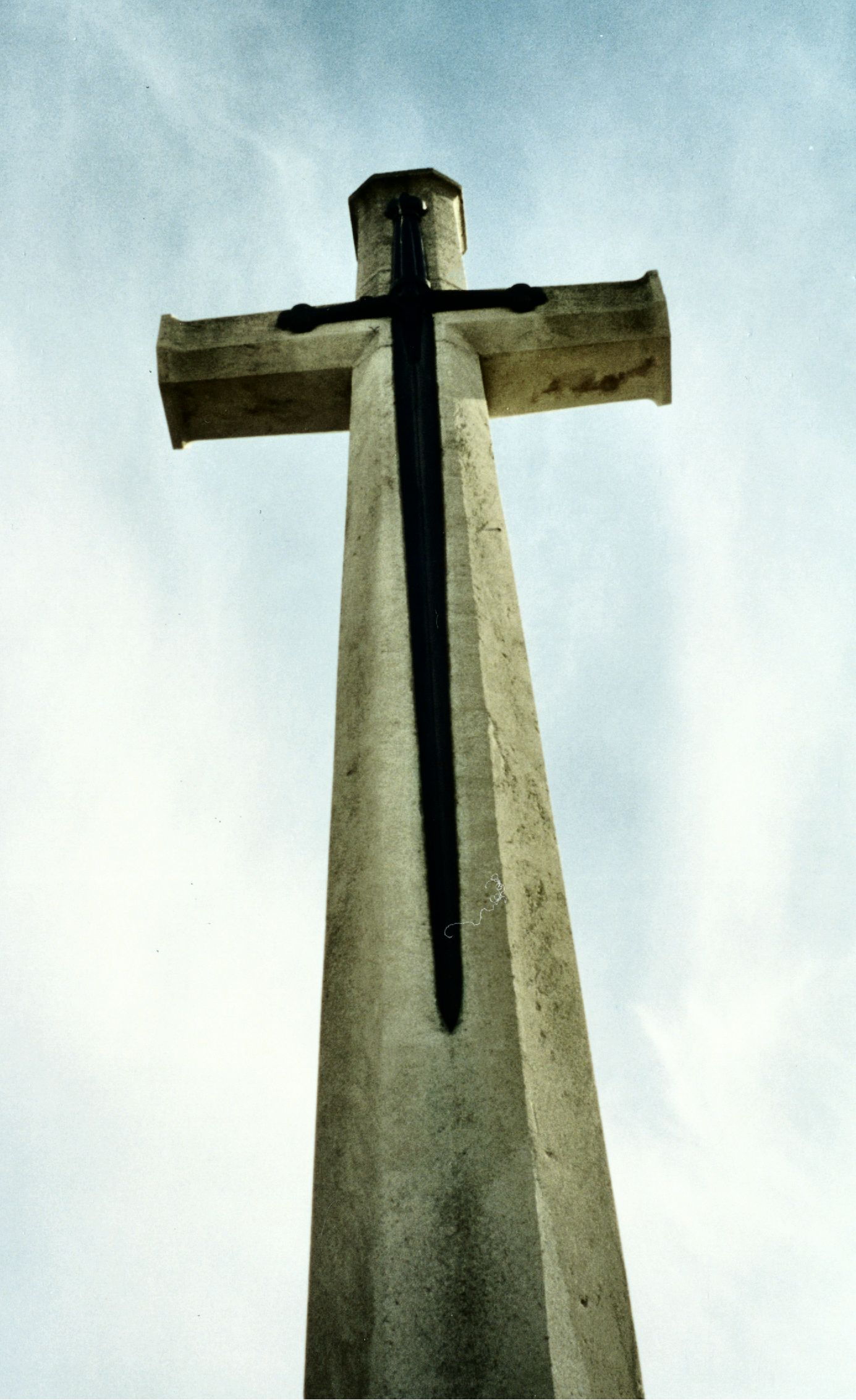
Cross of Sacrifice or War Cross, from a Commonwealth War Graves Commission cemetery (1920)

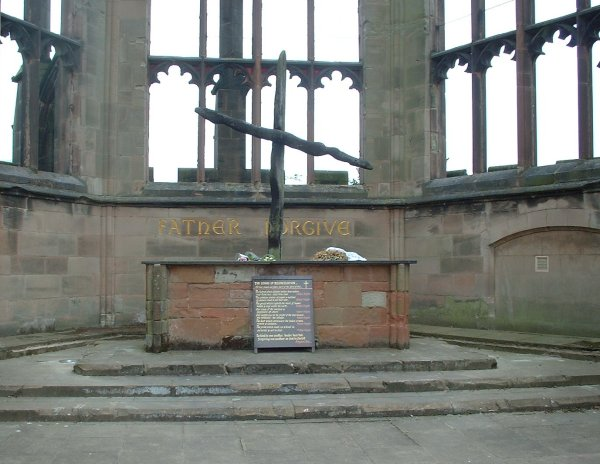
A wooden cross at Coventry Cathedral, constructed of the remnants of beams found after the Coventry Blitz

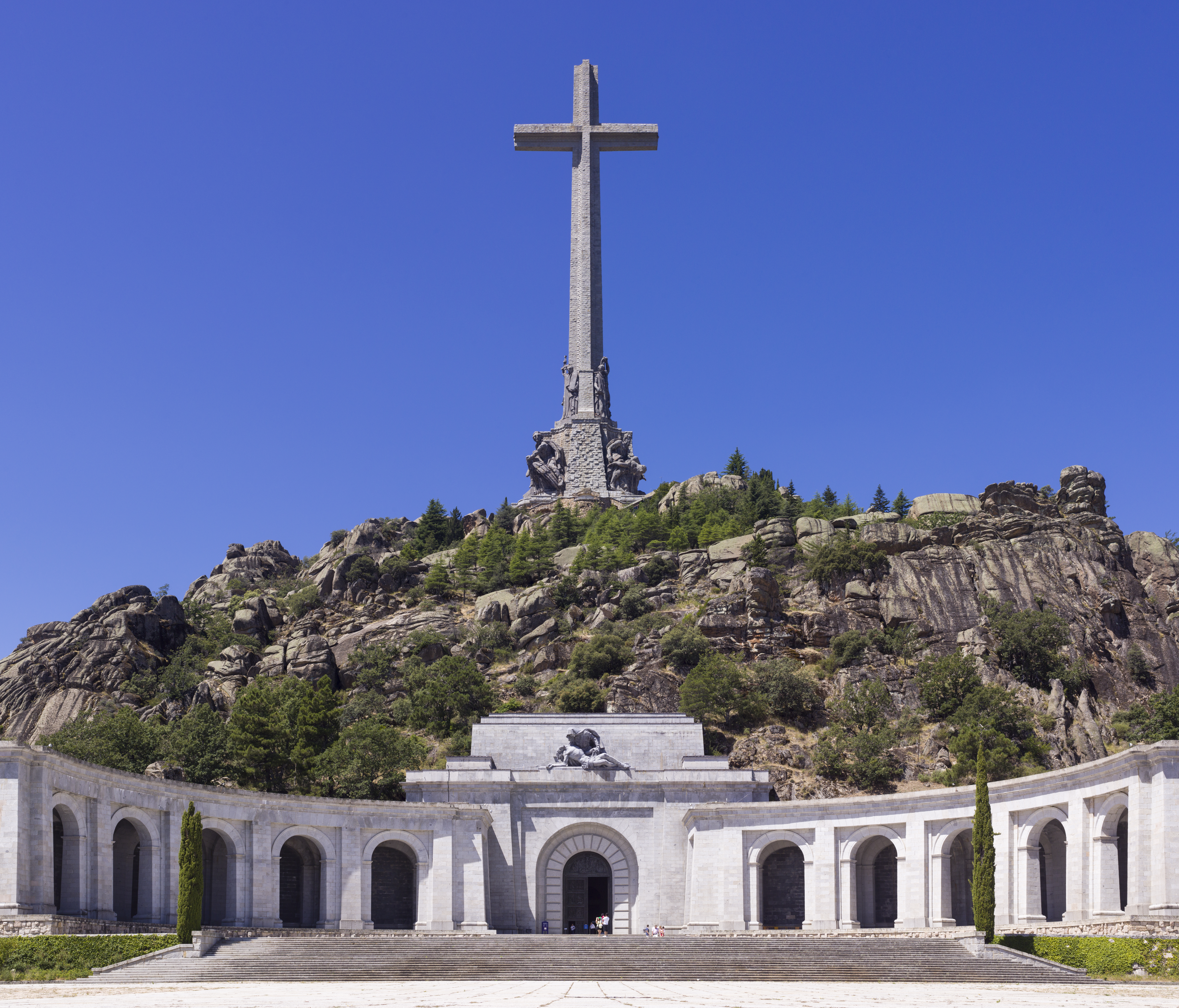
Cross in Valle de los Caídos near Madrid, the highest cross in the world (Juan de Ávalos 1959)

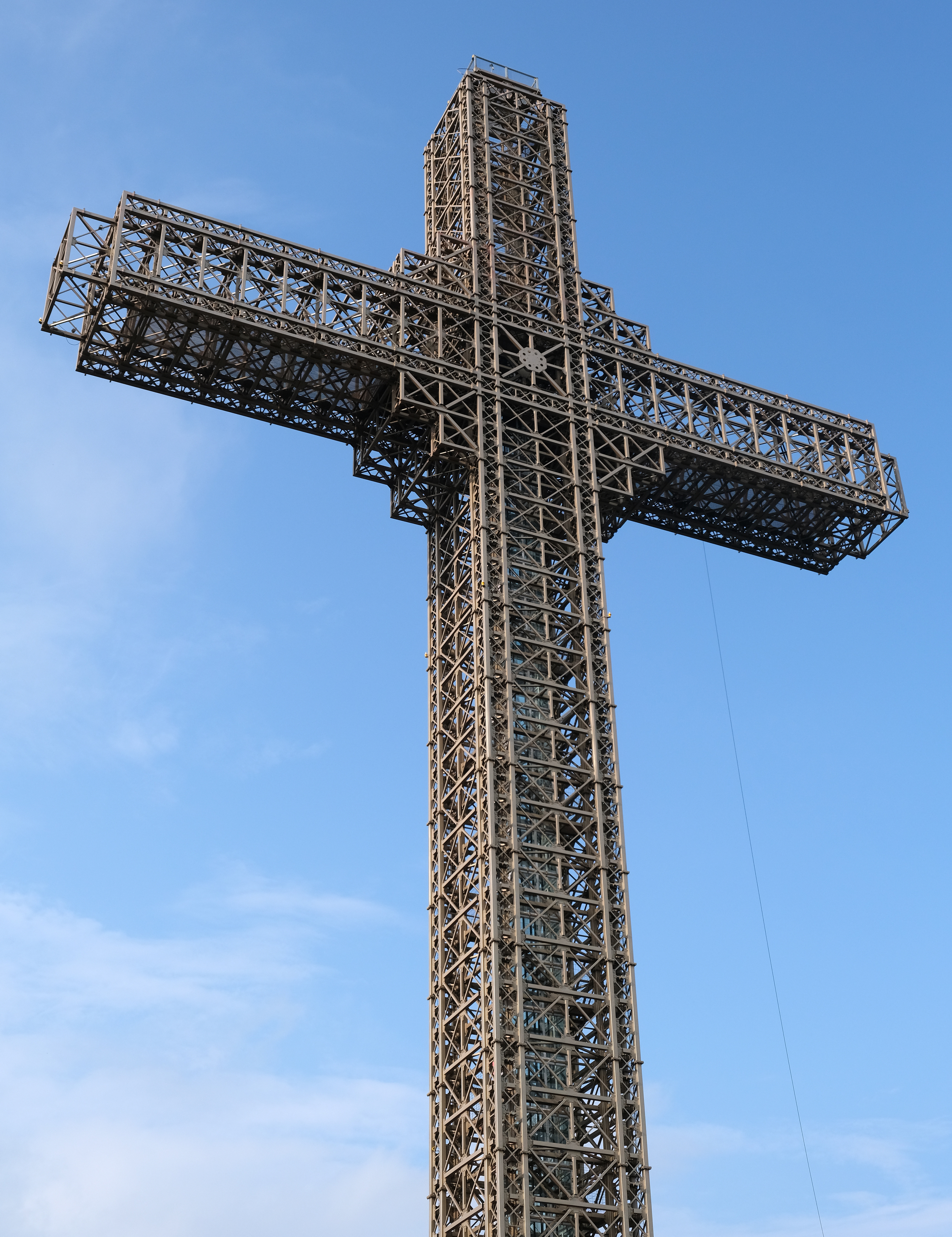
The Millennium Cross in Skopje, North Macedonia, one of the biggest crosses in the world (2000)

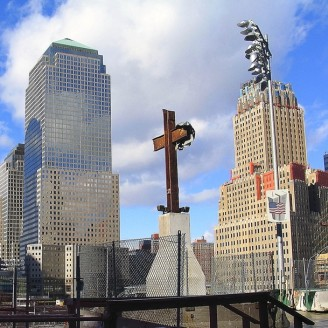
The World Trade Center Cross rises from the World Trade Center wreckage.

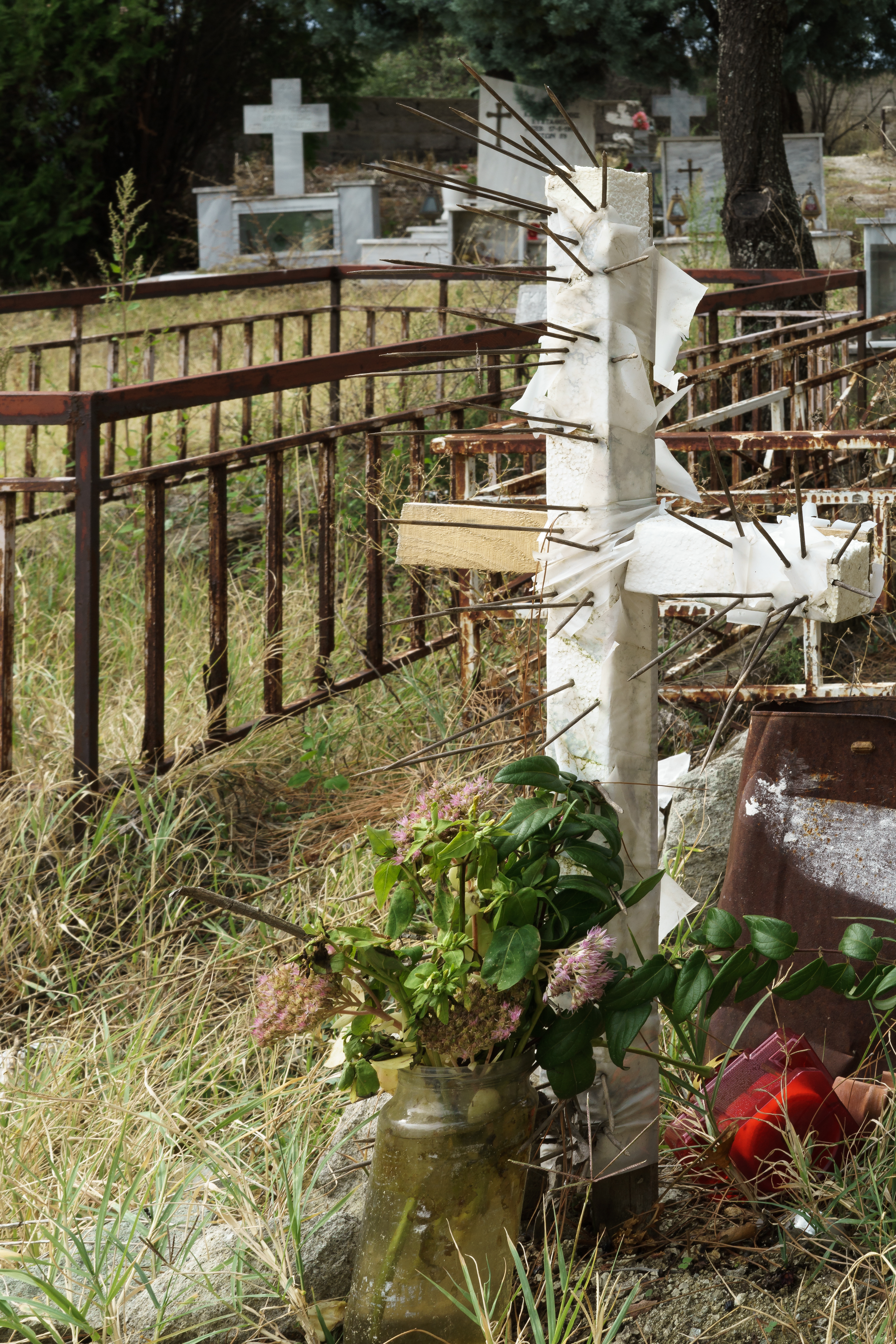
Grave cross with nails – Evros/Greece

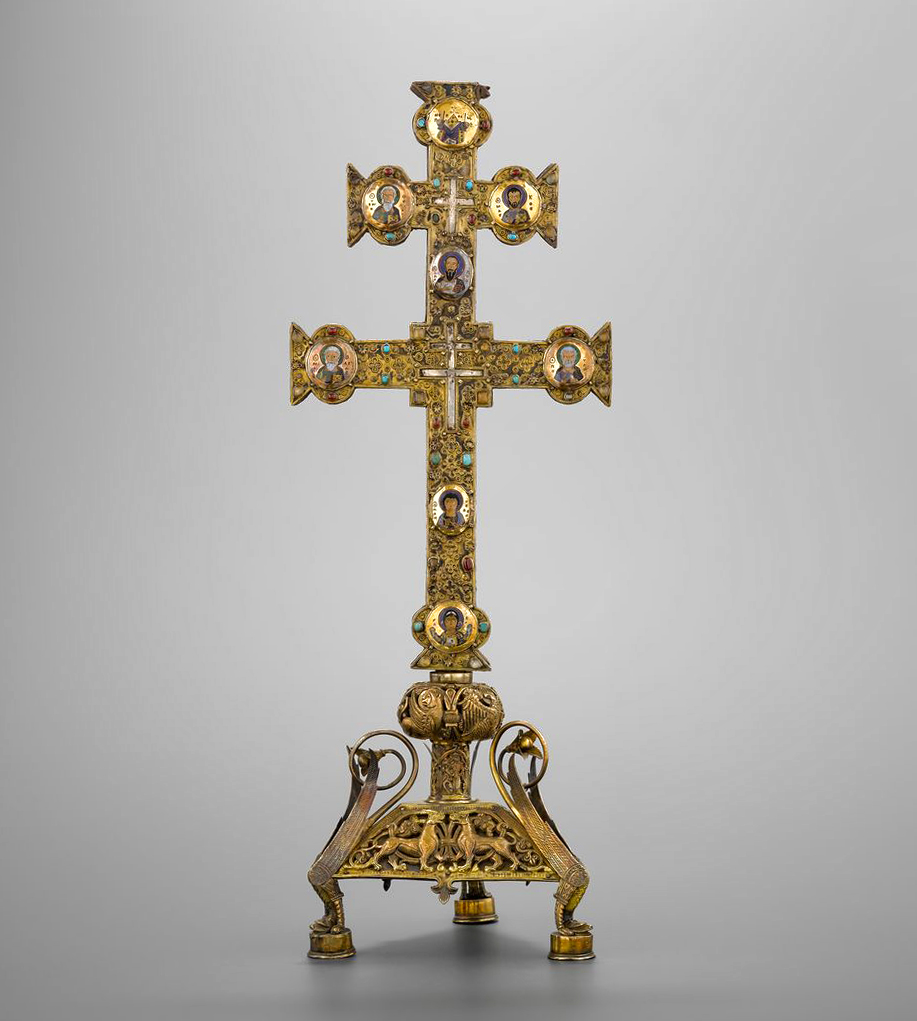
The Reliquary Cross of the Holy Cross

Hand holding Christian cross in the coat of arms of Pärnu

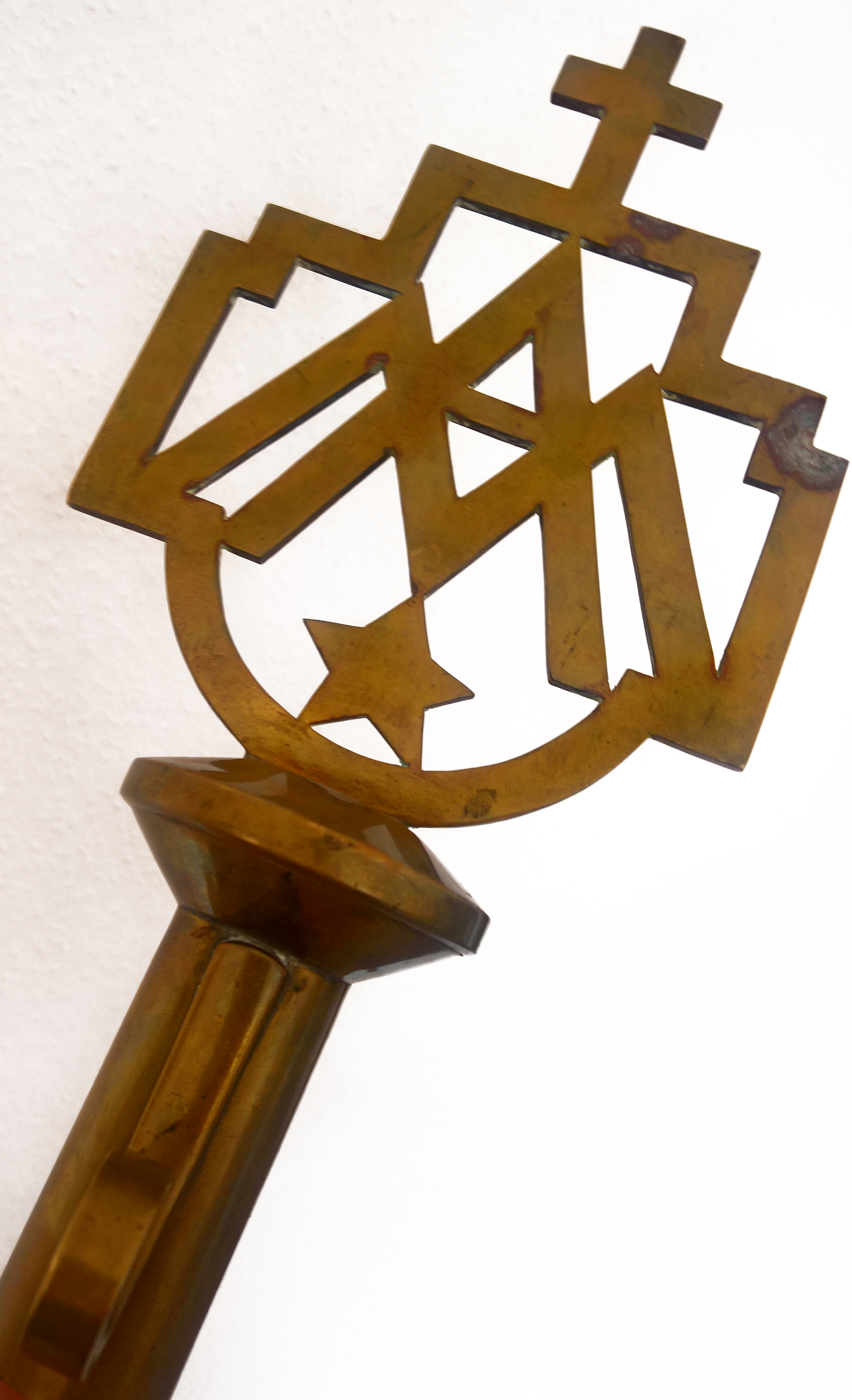
Ecclesiastical flag tip made of brass - Germany - III.Reich

== Controversies ==
In 2014, the Chinese Communist Party, which espouses a doctrine of state atheism, began a program of removing exterior crosses from church buildings "for reasons of safety and beauty." In 2016, 1,500 crosses were removed. In 2020, this campaign resumed, justified by the fact that some crosses were higher than the Chinese national flag.

== See also ==
- Atrial cross
- Chi Rho
- Christian cross variants
- Cross burning
- Cross necklace
- Cross of All Nations
- Crosses in heraldry
- Crucifixion in the arts
- Mandaean cross
- Ichthys
- IH Monogram
- IX monogram
- Khachkar
- Martyr's cross
- Nordic cross flag
- Rood screen
- Roodmas
- Rose Cross
- Russian Orthodox cross
- Scientology cross
- True Cross
