= Von Alvensleben =

von Alvensleben may refer to:

- Christian von Alvensleben (born 1941), German photographer
- Constantin von Alvensleben (1809–1892), Prussian general
- Gustav von Alvensleben (1803–1881), Prussian general
- 'Alvo' Gustav Konstantin von Alvensleben (1879–1965), Canadian/American entrepreneur
- Kathleen King von Alvensleben (born 1969), American-German architect
- Ludolf von Alvensleben (1901–1970), Nazi official
- Ludwig von Alvensleben (1800–1868), German writer from Berlin
- Werner von Alvensleben (1875–1947), German businessman and politician
- Alvensleben Convention, a Russo-Prussian treaty of 1863
- House of Alvensleben, a German aristocratic family
