= Crux simplex =

Torture pike

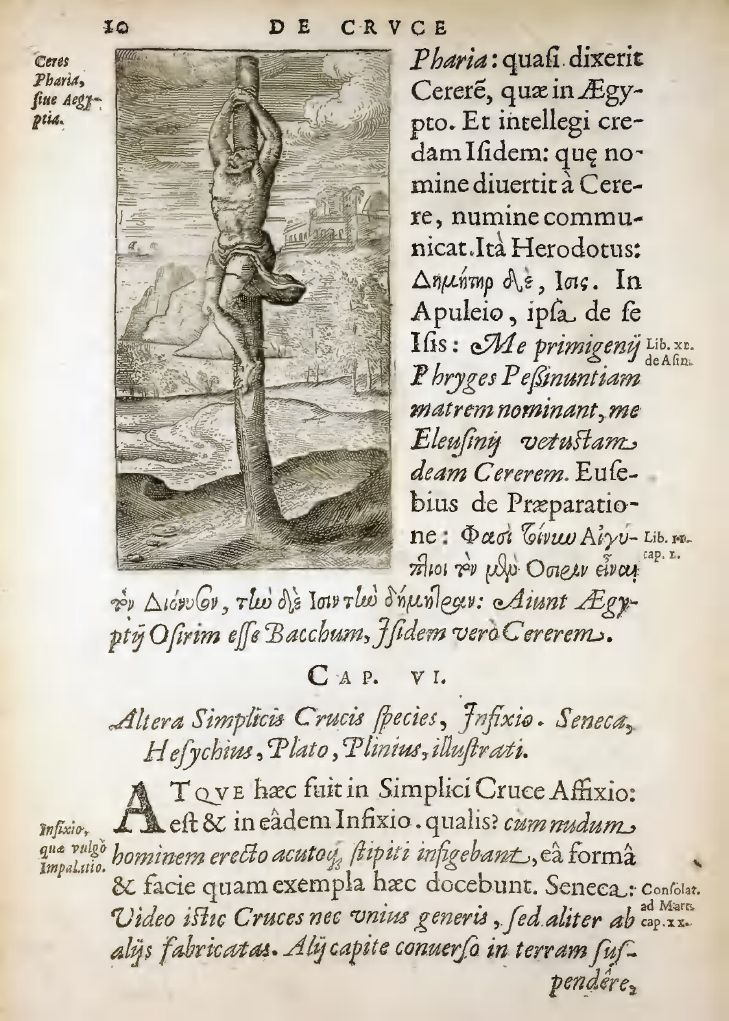
In his De Cruce (Antwerp 1594), p. 10 Justus Lipsius explained the two forms of what he called the crux simplex.

The term crux simplex was used by Justus Lipsius (1547–1606) to indicate a plain transom-less wooden stake used for executing either by affixing the victim to it or by impaling him with it (Simplex [...] voco, cum in uno simplicique ligno fit affixio, aut infixio). He thus distinguished two types of crux simplex: the crux simplex ad affixionem and the crux simplex ad infixionem.

Lipsius contrasted the crux simplex (both variations) with the two-timber structure that he called a crux compacta (Compacta Crux est, quae manu facta, idque e duplici ligno), and that he subdivided into three types: crux decussata (X-shaped), crux commissa (T-shaped) and crux immissa (†-shaped).

All these linguistic terms are of Lipsius's own invention and were not in use in ancient Roman times, however all of these forms of execution were used by the Romans, dating back to the Roman Republic.

== The Latin word crux ==
Latin crux meant generically "a tree, frame, or other wooden instruments of execution, on which criminals were impaled or hanged" and in particular "a cross". The field of etymology is of no help in any effort to trace a supposed original meaning of crux.

Seneca the Younger (c. 4 BC – AD 65) records the use in the first century AD of the crux simplex ad infixionem (impalement), but does not mention the crux simplex ad affixionem; he seems to indicate that execution on a crux tended to follow a fairly common routine, while still being open to significant variations. Departure from normal routine is also mentioned by Josephus (37 – c. 100) in his The Jewish War: "The soldiers, out of the wrath and hatred they bore the Jews, nailed those they caught, one after one way, and another after another, to the crosses, by way of jest, when their multitude was so great, that room was wanting for the crosses, and crosses wanting for the bodies".

Lucian (125 – after 180) indicates that the normal execution cross was shaped like the letter T (in Greek called tau). In his Trial of the Court of the Vowels the Greek letter Sigma (Σ) accuses the letter Tau (Τ) of having provided tyrants with the model for the wooden instrument with which to crucify people: "It was his body that tyrants took for a model, his shape that they imitated, when they set up the erections on which men are crucified."

The word crux took on the metaphorical meaning of torment or torture, especially mental (crucio).

== Crux simplex ad affixionem ==
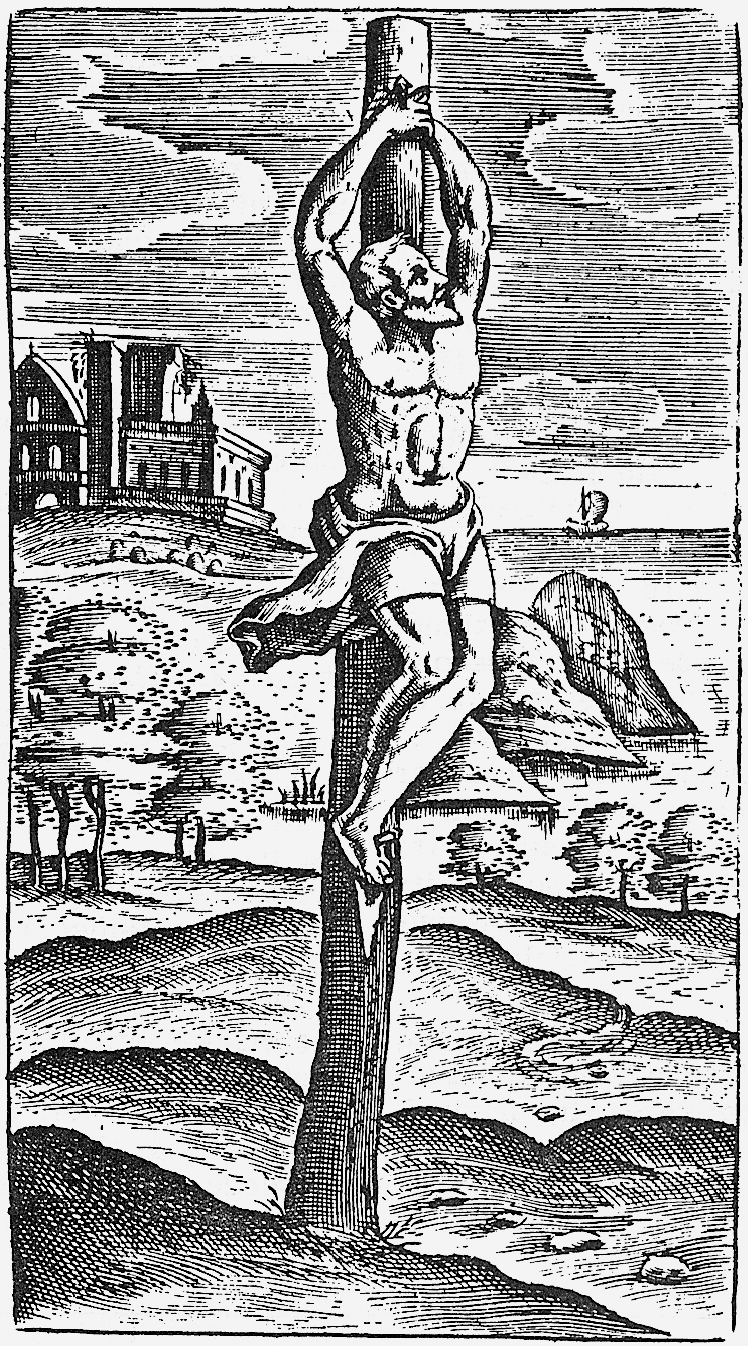
Drawing by Justus Lipsius: Crux simplex ad affixionem

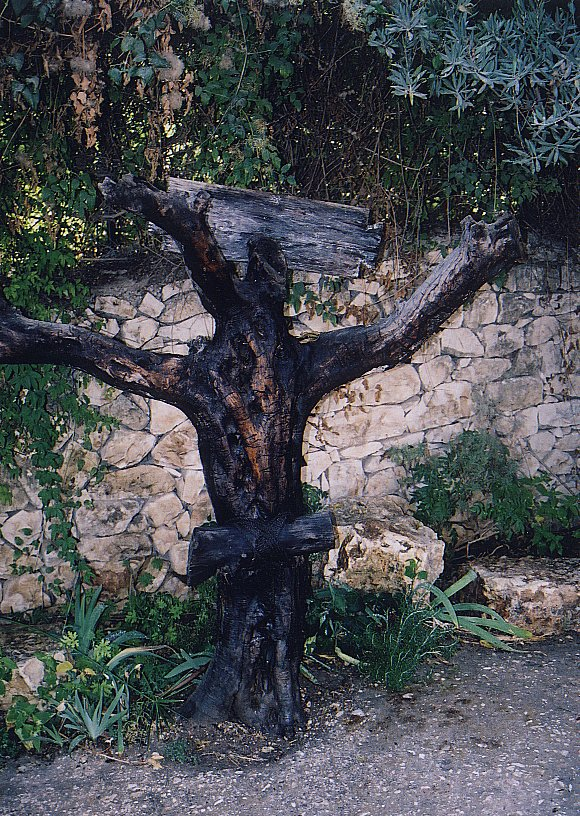
Olive tree arranged as for a crucifixion (World of the Bible Garden, Ein Karem)

Justus Lipsius devoted chapter V of book I of his De Cruce to the crux simplex ad affixionem, the type of crux simplex on which someone was left to die by being fastened to it. As pictured in a poem by Ausonius, the victim could be affixed to the trunk of a tree with his arms attached to the branches. Even on its own the trunk could serve for that purpose. According to Lipsius, who quotes the report of Tertullian of the crucifixion of priests of Saturn on trees of their temple, trees, either trimmed or in full foliage, were in fact used for this purpose, particularly in mass crucifixions.

The museum at Ein Kerem, Israel known as the World of the Bible Garden has among its exhibits an olive tree arranged as for a crucifixion.

In 1594, Lipsius gave as his opinion that from the crux simplex ad affixionem the cross as generally pictured today was developed. In 1866, Patrick Farbairn expressed the same view in The Imperial Bible-Dictionary, adding that the Romans commonly joined a transom to the upright when crucifying rather than impaling: "Even amongst the Romans the crux (from which our cross is derived) appears to have been originally an upright pole, and this always remained the more prominent part. But from the time that it began to be used as an instrument of punishment, a transverse piece of wood was commonly added: not, however, always even then. For it would seem that there were more kinds of death than one by the cross; this being sometimes accomplished by transfixing the criminal with a pole, which was run through his back and spine, and came out at his mouth (adactum per medium hominem, qui per os emergat, stipitem)".

According to Joseph Zias, Curator of Archaeology/Anthropology for the Israel Antiquities Authority from 1972 to 1997, the quickest and most efficient manner of execution "would be to simply tie the victim to the tree or cross with his hands suspended directly over his head. Death thus would occur within minutes or perhaps an hour if the victim's feet were not nailed or tied down." The addition of a crossbeam prolonged the victim's suffering beyond what would be the time of dying if suspended with hands directly above his head as in the Justus Lipsius drawing.

Also according to Dr. Frederick Zugibe, the vertical crucifixion style would precipitate suffocation in a short time, from hours to even minutes, depending on whether you had any support on your feet to be able to sit up and breathe.

Referring to mass executions carried out by the Romans, Professor Hermann Fulda wrote in the 19th century: "Trees were not available everywhere that was chosen for a public execution, so a simple beam was sunk into the ground. This, with the hands raised upwards, and often also with the feet, was tied or nailed to the outlaws".

In 1904, Paul Wilhelm Schmidt wrote: "Anything other than a simple hanging is ruled out by the method of mass executions that was frequently followed: 2000 at a time by Varus (Ant. Josh. XVII 10. 10), by Quadratus (War of the Jews II 12. 6), by the procurator Felix (War of the Jews II 15. 2 [13. 2]), by Titus (War of the Jews VII. 1 [V 11. 1])".

Ninety years later, Raymond E. Brown commented: "Occasionally just an upright stake was used, and the condemned's hands were raised vertically and nailed extended above his head. (This is not what happened in Jesus' case, since he carried a cross[beam] to the place of execution.)"; and in the 21st century, "most historians believe that victims carried only the crossbeam (patibulum) to the place of execution. The beam would then have been fixed to the vertical post (stipes), which had already been set into the ground".

== Crux simplex ad infixionem ==
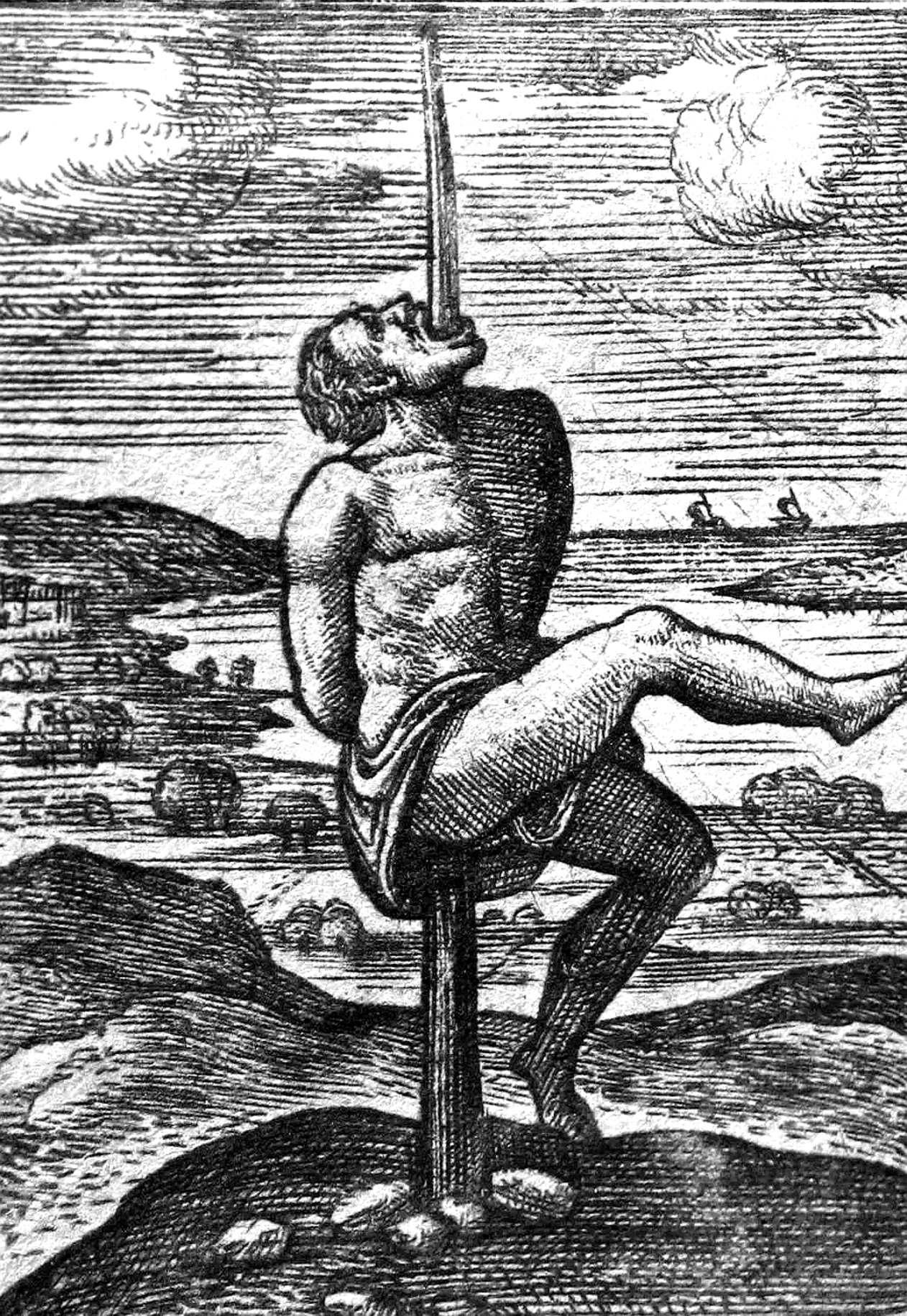
Drawing by Justus Lipsius: Crux simplex ad infixionem

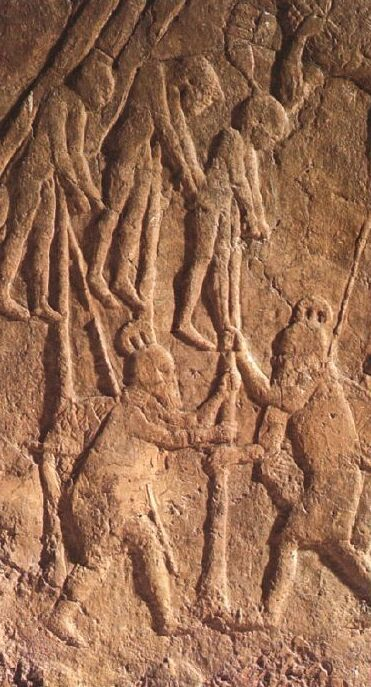
Judeans impaled by Assyrian military under Sennacherib (701 BC)

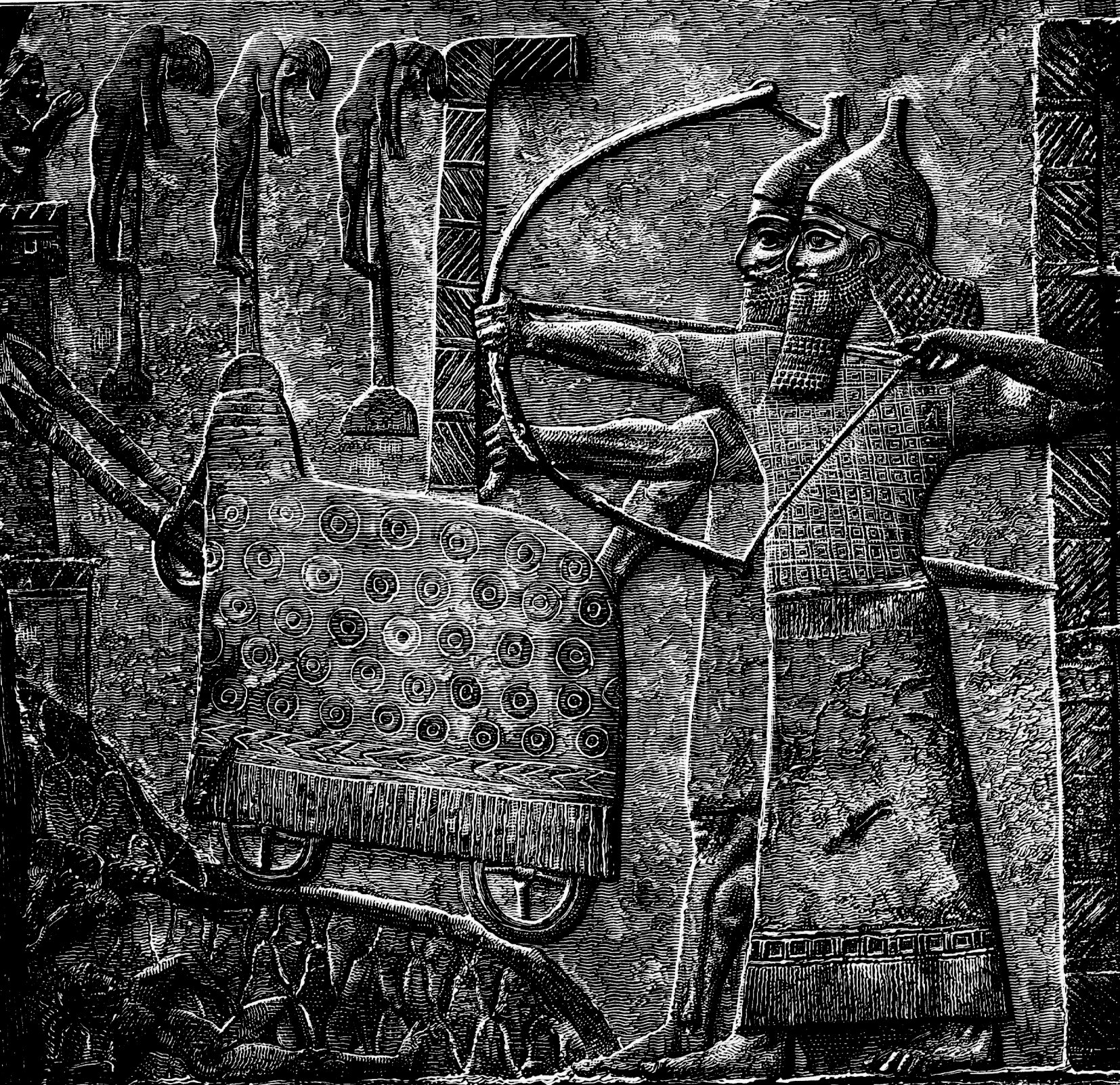
Assyrian archers and impalement of prisoners

Chapter VI of book I of Justus Lipsius's De Cruce considers the other variation of the crux simplex, namely the crux simplex ad infixionem used for impaling. It draws on Seneca the Younger, Hesychius of Alexandria, Gaius Maecenas and Pliny the Elder. To speak of what Lipsius would later call the crux simplex ad infixionem, Seneca (c. 4 BC – AD 65) uses the term stipes, the same term employed for the upright portion of the composite cross (the crux compacta). In his Epistulae Morales ad Lucilium Seneca mentions the adactum per medium hominem qui per os emergat stipitem (the stake which they drive straight through a man until it protrudes from his throat); and in his De Consolatione ad Marciam he says that alii per obscena stipitem egerunt (some force a stick upward through his groin).

Executions by impalement were carried out for thousands of years before the Roman period, and also after (cf. Vlad the Impaler).

It was prescribed in law 153 of the Code of Hammurabi of about 1754 BC.

The Neo-Assyrian Empire (911–612 BC) impaled on long upright stakes and included illustrations of the practice in its inscriptions.

Impalement was used also in the First Persian Empire (c. 550–330 BC), as seems to be attested also in the Hebrew Bible (Old Testament), which cites a decree of about 519 BC of Darius I authorizing resumption of the rebuilding of the Temple in Jerusalem and ordering that interference with the work would be punished by death. In the Behistun Inscription Darius boasts of having impaled his enemies, and Herodotus says that Darius punished a rebellion by Babylon by impaling three thousand of its leading citizens.

Impalement was employed in 15th century Romania, being very frequently used by Vlad "the Impaler" Tepes, who, standing out for his incredible cruelty, became the historical source of the literary creature Dracula. He was ruthless and in the cities where he was not accepted, executions were carried out for impaling men, women and children, as in the cases of the Transylvanian city of Kronstadt (Brașov) and Hermannstadt (Sibiu), both cities inhabited by German settlers who did not want to trade with him or pay him tribute. In 1459 he had impaled 30,000 German settlers (Saxons) and officials, thus starting his career of brutal massacres, among which are attributed to him the extermination of between 40,000 and 100,000 people between 1456 and 1462, facts detailed in documents and engravings of the time, which showed his taste for blood and impaling, so he started to be called Țepeș which means in Romanian: impaler.

== See also ==
- Outline of capital punishment
- Crux commissa
- Crux immissa
- Crux decussata
- Crucifixion
- Crucifixion of Jesus
- Descriptions in antiquity of the execution cross
- Instrument of Jesus' crucifixion
- Capital punishment
