= Ludolf von Alvensleben =

German Nazi functionary, SS and Police Leader, SS-Gruppenführer (1901–1970)

Ludolf-Hermann von Alvensleben
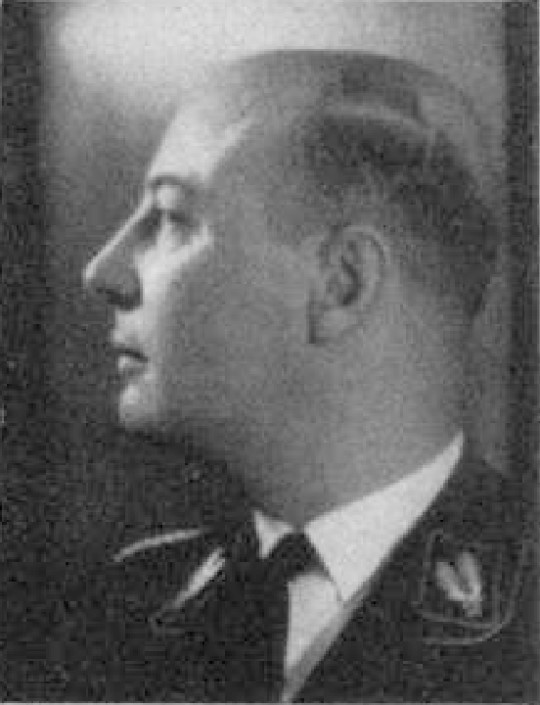
- Born: Ludolf-Hermann Emmanuel Georg Kurt Werner von Alvensleben; 17 March 1901; Halle, Province of Saxony, German Empire
- Died: 1 April 1970 (aged 69); Santa Rosa de Calamuchita, Córdoba Province, Argentina
- Military career
- Allegiance: German Empire; Nazi Germany
- Branch: Waffen-SS
- Service years: 1934–1945
- Rank: SS-Gruppenführer
- Conflicts: World War I World War II

Ludolf-Hermann Emmanuel Georg Kurt Werner von Alvensleben (17 March 1901 – 1 April 1970) was a Schutzstaffel (SS) functionary of Nazi Germany. He held positions of SS and Police Leader in occupied Poland and the Soviet Union, and was indicted for war crimes including the killing of at least 4,247 Poles by units under his command.

== Early life and career ==
Alvensleben was born in Halle in the Prussian Province of Saxony into the noble family von Alvensleben. His father was Prussian Major General Ludolf von Alvensleben (1844–1912). Ludolf's father had already retired from active service to administer the family's manor around Schochwitz Castle, which had been inherited from Alvensleben's grandfather, the Prussian general Hermann von Alvensleben (1809–1887).

Alvensleben enlisted in the Prussian cadet corps in 1911, and in 1918 joined the 10th (Magdeburg) Hussars Regiment, but did not fight in World War I. He was briefly a member in a paramilitary Freikorps unit in 1920. Between 1923 and July 1929, he was a member of the nationalist Der Stahlhelm organization. Upon the death of his father in December 1912, he inherited the family's manor at Schochwitz. He wed Melitta von Guaita on 3 May 1924; the marriage produced four children. He also later fathered a son raised as a Lebensborn child.

== Nazi party and SS career ==
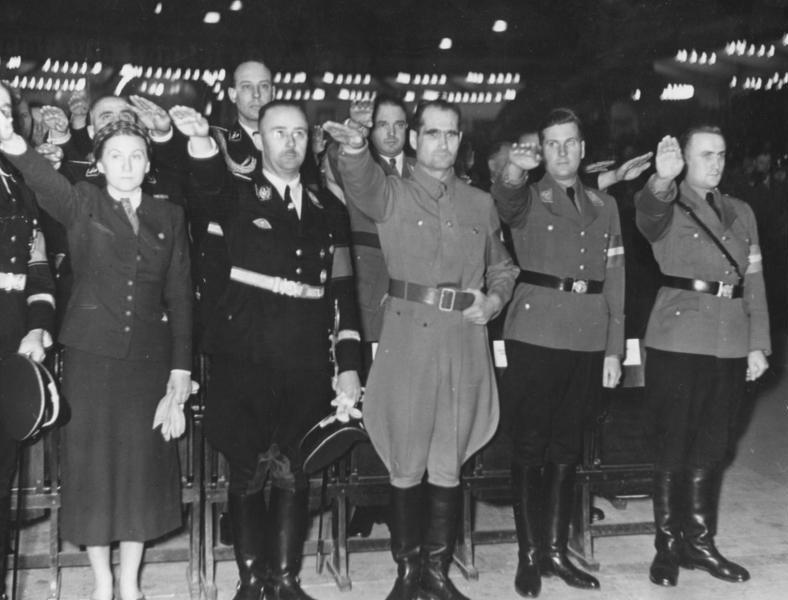
Hitler Youth rally, Berlin Sportpalast, 13 February 1939: Gertrud Scholtz-Klink, Heinrich Himmler, Rudolf Hess, Baldur von Schirach, Artur Axmann; Alvensleben standing behind Himmler

Alvensleben joined the Nazi Party and Sturmabteilung (SA) in 1929. He soon became head of the local branch in Eisleben and chief district official in Mansfeld Land. From July 1931, he chaired the motorized corps of the SA in the Gau of Halle-Merseburg. Alvensleben left the SA in 1932; at that time he was heavily indebted and had a considerable criminal record on charges which included libel and road traffic offence.

After the Machtergreifung, Alvensleben and Gauleiter Rudolf Jordan on 12 February 1933, organized a violent attack of SA and SS paramilitaries on Communist officials in Eisleben, whereby three men were killed and many others injured, an event later known as Eisleben Bloody Sunday. In March 1933, Alvensleben became a member of the Saxon provincial parliament and of the Landtag of Prussia. At the November 1933 parliamentary election, he was elected as a deputy to the Reichstag from electoral constituency 11 (Merseburg). He remained a Reichstag member until the fall of the Nazi regime in May 1945, switching to constituency 31 (Württemberg) at the April 1938 election.

On 5 April 1934, he joined the Schutzstaffel (SS) and became commander of the 46th Regiment in Dresden in the rank of Obersturmbannführer. On 22 August 1934, Alvensleben received a reprimand by Reichsführer-SS Heinrich Himmler for having insulted a woman in Leipzig in April. From 1 October 1935, he assumed the leadership of the 26th SS-Regiment in his hometown Halle. His advancement continued: he became commander of SS-District X in Stuttgart on 20 September 1936 and commander of SS-District XXXIII in Schwerin on 1 July 1937.

Alvensleben's career continued after the 1939 Invasion of Poland as commander of the Volksdeutscher Selbstschutz ('German Self-Defense') organization in what was to become the newly established Reichsgau Danzig-West Prussia. He told his men on 16 October 1939:

You are now the master race here. Nothing was yet built up through softness and weakness... That’s why I expect, just as our Führer Adolf Hitler expects from you, that you are disciplined, but stand together hard as Krupp steel. Don’t be soft, be merciless, and clear out everything that is not German and could hinder us in the work of construction.

The Selbstschutz paramilitary forces, formed by members of the German minority in Poland and led by SS officials, performed mass executions during the Intelligenzaktion Pommern in the "Fordon Valley of Death", the Massacres in Piaśnica, and other atrocities. In a letter to Himmler, Alvensleben complained about scrupulous Wehrmacht officers too weak to take drastic measures. In 1939 he confiscated the Jewish-owned manors of Rucewo and Rucewko in Reichsgau Wartheland.

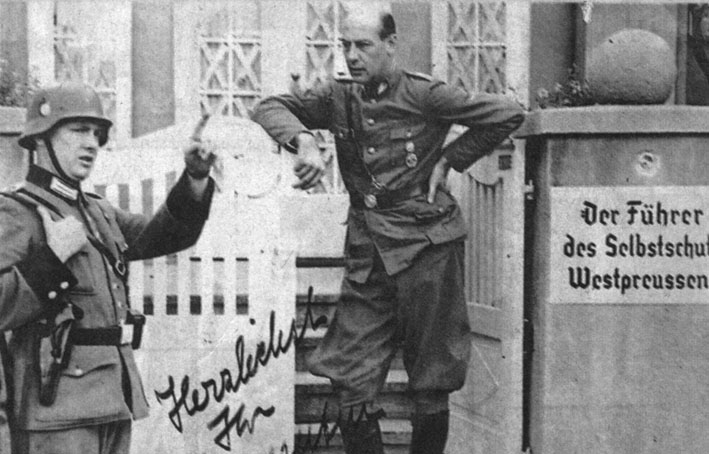
Alvensleben as commander of Volksdeutscher Selbstschutz in Bydgoszcz, 1939

In December 1939, Alvensleben was appointed member-of-staff at the command of Friedrich-Wilhelm Krüger, the SS and Police Leader in Kraków, General Government. On 23 May 1940, he was promoted to the rank of Hauptsturmführer in the Waffen-SS. From February 1941 he was in service of the Reich Security Main Office, assumed the SS and Police Leader command in Chernigov on 22 October 1941 and of Simferopol in Crimea on 19 November. In 1942, Alvensleben was SS inspector of the Durchgangsstrasse IV, a large forced labor project to build a road from Lemberg to Stalino (now Donetsk). From 6 October 1943, he held this position in Nikolaev in the rank of Major General, officially assigned to Army Group A; his tenure was accompanied by irregularities and further mass executions.

On 19 February 1944, he succeeded Udo von Woyrsch as Higher SS and Police Leader in Dresden. He took the occasion to take action against his creditors, such as Carl Wentzel who was denounced after the 20 July plot, arrested and executed, whereafter Alvensleben was able to release his heavily indebted manor in Schochwitz. In the late days of the war, he left Dresden and fled to the West.

== Post-war escape ==
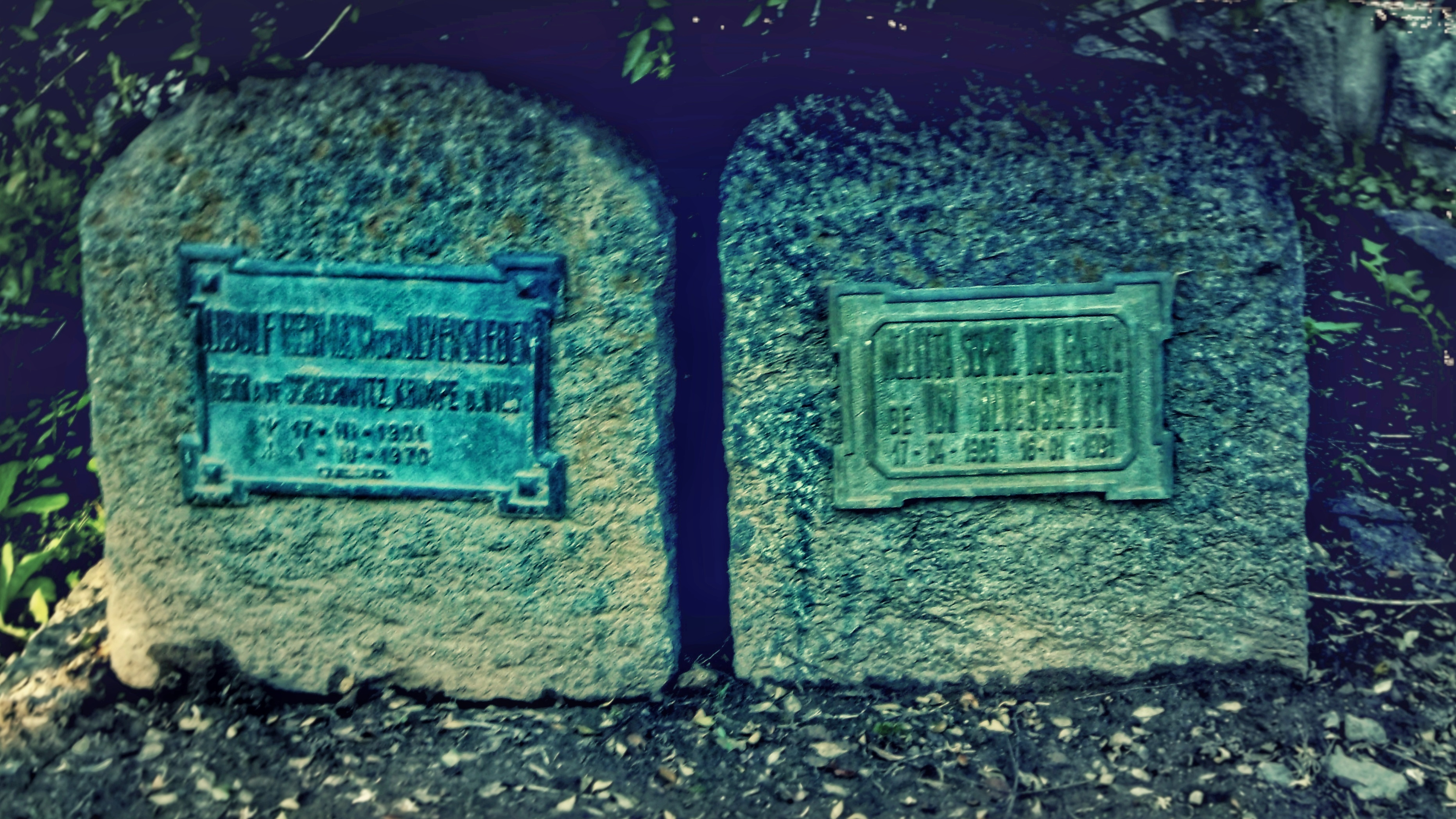
Graves of Ludolf von Alvensleben (left) and his wife Melitta Sophie von Guaita (right) in Santa Rosa de Calamuchita, Córdoba, Argentina.

In April 1945, Alvensleben was apprehended by British forces. At the end of 1945, he escaped from the internment camp at Neuengamme in Hamburg. After a short stay in Schochwitz, he fled with his family to Argentina in early 1946. Although there is no precise data on when they arrived in the country, according to a 2000 documentary film, the government of Juan Perón granted Alvensleben citizenship under the name of Carlos Lücke on 27 November 1952.

He lived in Buenos Aires until July 1956 and then moved to Santa Rosa de Calamuchita. From November 1952, he served as inspector of fish farming. A Polish court sentenced Alvensleben to death in absentia.

In January 1964, the district court of Munich issued an arrest warrant for Alvensleben for the killing of at least 4,247 people in Poland by units of the Selbstschutz under Alvensleben's command in late 1939. Attempts by the prosecution had no consequences for Alvensleben and he died in 1970 in Argentina, without having been brought to trial.

== See also ==
- Ludolf von Alvensleben
- List of Nazi Party leaders and officials

== Bibliography ==
- Filip Gańczak, Polakożerca, Prószyński Media Sp. z o.o., Warsaw 2026. ISBN 978-83-8391-355-1.
- Joachim Lilla, Statisten in Uniform. Die Mitglieder des Reichstages 1933–1945. Düsseldorf, 2004. ISBN 3-7700-5254-4
- Andreas Schulz and Günter Wegmann, Die Generale der Waffen-SS und der Polizei. Band 1, Biblio-Verlag, Bissendorf, 2003. ISBN 3-7648-2373-9.
- Ruth Bettina Birn, Die Höheren SS- und Polizeiführer. Himmlers Vertreter im Reich und in den besetzten Gebieten. Droste Verlag, Düsseldorf, 1986. ISBN 3-7700-0710-7
- Klaus D. Patzwall (ed.), Das Goldene Parteiabzeichen und seine Verleihungen ehrenhalber 1934–1944, Verlag Klaus D. Patzwall, Norderstedt 2004, ISBN 3-931533-50-6
