= Hermann von Alvensleben =

Prussian Generalleutnant

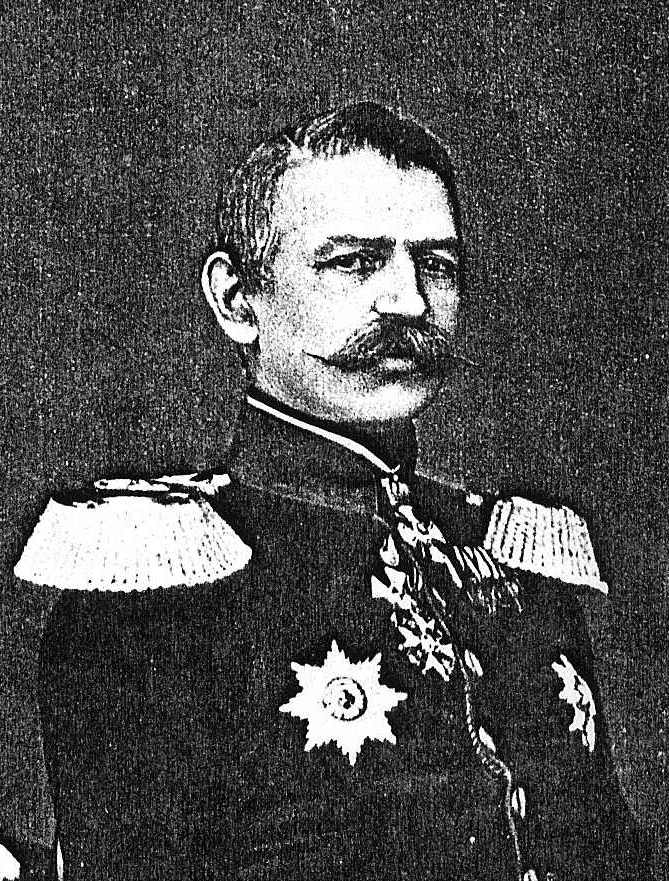
- Born: 10 April 1809; Schochwitz, District of Halle, Departement der Saale, Kingdom of Westphalia
- Died: 8 January 1887 (aged 77); Schochwitz, Province of Saxony, Kingdom of Prussia, Germany
- Spouse: Karoline von Kalitzsch (m. 1836)
- Military career
- Allegiance: Prussia; German Confederation; North German Confederation; German Empire
- Branch: Prussian Army
- Service years: 1827 – 1871
- Rank: Generalleutnant
- Commands: 1st Cavalry Division
- Conflicts: Austro-Prussian War: Battle of Königgrätz; Franco-Prussian War

Hermann Karl Rudolf Gebhard von Alvensleben (1809–1887) was a Prussian Generalleutnant who participated in the Austro-Prussian War and the Franco-Prussian War. He commanded the 1st Cavalry Division during the Battle of Königgrätz and commanded several Army Corps' during the Franco-Prussian War.

== Origin ==
Hermann comes from the Low German noble family, the House of Alvensleben. He was the son of the Prussian lieutenant general Johann Friedrich Karl II. von Alvensleben (1778–1831) and his wife Karoline, née von Hirschfeld (1783–1849).

== Military career ==
After visiting the Kadettenhaus Neubau, he joined the regiment of the Gardes du Corps of the Prussian Army on 28 July 1827, as a flag ensign. In 1866, he led the 1st Cavalry Division in the cavalry corps of the 1st Army as a Major General during the Austro-Prussian War. After the end of the war he was promoted to lieutenant general and commanded the Guards Cavalry Division. On 5 September 1867 Alvensleben was initially put in charge of managing the business as head of the Militärreitinstitut Hannover and was appointed head on 14 December 1867. During the Franco-Prussian War in July 1870, Alvensleben was the governor general in the I, II, III and X Corps under General Eduard Vogel von Falckenstein. A month later, he was ordered to Bremen to organize the guarding of the coast from Dorum to Emden. Alvensleben was relieved of this position at the end of March 1871 and was placed on the retiree list on 15 April 1871. He returned to Schochwitz and lived there until his death on 8 January 1887.

=== Legacy ===
Alvenslebenstraße in Hanover was named after him.

== Family ==
Alvensleben married Karoline von Kalitzsch (1814–1878) on 6 October 1836 in Dobritz. The marriage produced ten children, including:

- Arthur Gebhard (b. 4 June 1838 in Potsdam), 2nd Lieutenant in the 2. Escadron/Neumärkisches Dragoner-Regiment Nr. 3, † 3 July 1866 during the Battle of Königgrätz near Sadowa
- Busso Friedrich Karl (b. 25 February 1840 in Potsdam), 1st Lieutenant in the Ostpreußisches Jäger-Bataillon Nr. 1, † 14 August 1870 during the Battle of Borny–Colombey near the La Planchette inn; ⚭ 1865 Jenny Anna Kukein (1848–1868), 2 children
- Ludolf Hermann Arthur (1844–1912), Major General; ⚭ Antoinette Freiin von Ricou (1870–1950), 3 children
- Mechthild Elisabeth Agnes (1859–1941); ⚭ 1890 Alkmar II. von Alvensleben (1841–1898), Prussian lieutenant general
- Gertrud Elisabeth Pauline (1852–1946); ⚭ 1878 Heinrich Bartels (1848–1914), lord of Langendorf
- Elsbeth Karoline Eugenie (1856–1945); ⚭ 1886 Alexander von Schwarzenberg-Hohenlandsberg (1842–1918)
