= House of Alvensleben =

German noble family

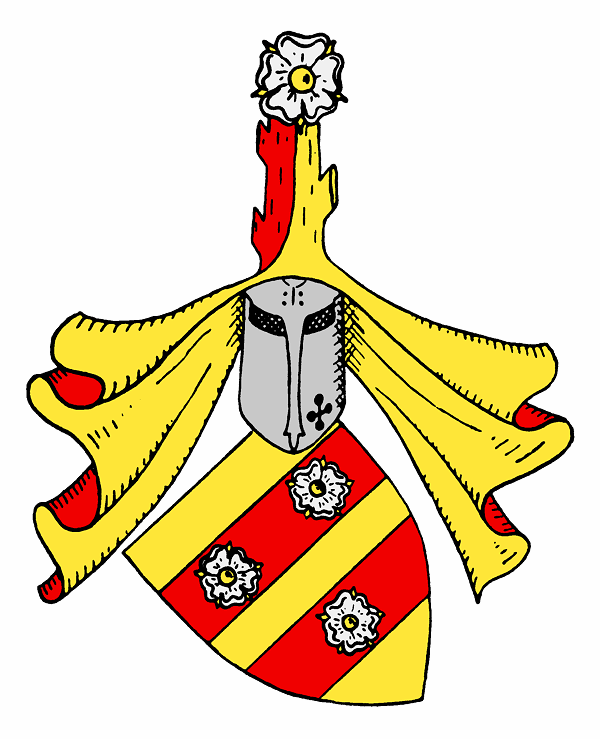
Coat of arms of Alvensleben

The House of Alvensleben is an ancient, Low German (niederdeutsch) noble family from the Altmark region, whose earliest known member, Wichard de Alvensleve, is first mentioned in 1163 as a ministerialis of the Bishopric of Halberstadt. The family name derives from Alvensleben Castle (today Bebertal, district of Börde in Saxony-Anhalt). They are one of the oldest extant German aristocratic families.

== History ==
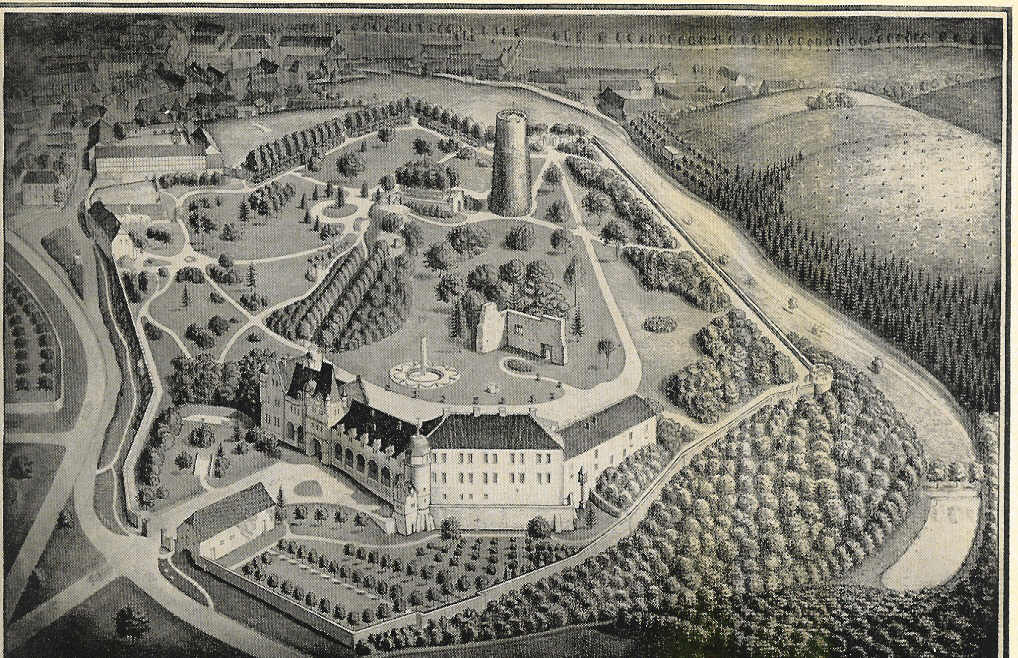
Alvensleben Castle

The family line begins with Gebhard von Alvensleben, probably Wichard's son, mentioned between 1190 and 1216. The Alvenslebens were hereditary seneschals (Erbtruchsessen) of the Bishopric and Principality of Halberstadt from the 12th century. In the beginning, they served as Burgmannen in the bishop's castle of Alvensleben. Around 1270 they acquired their own family estate, Erxleben Castle, and, around 1324, Kalbe Castle.

Friedrich von Alvensleben (c 1265-1313) was master of the Knights Templar in their German and Slavic districts. His elder brothers founded two branches, the white and the black Alvenslebens, whereas the red branch died out in 1553.

The family acquired many further estates, some located in the Archbishopric of Magdeburg, the Margraviate of Brandenburg and the Duchy of Brunswick. Gebhard XIV. von Alvensleben (mentioned 1393–1425) was part of the noblemen's opposition against Frederick I, Elector of Brandenburg, the first Hohenzollern to rule Brandenburg, but was later subdued by him.

The family generated two catholic bishops of Havelberg in the 15th and 16th centuries, but then became Lutheran Protestants. Joachim I. von Alvensleben (1514-1588) promoted the reformation in the Altmark region. The family provided many heads of government in this province, as well as a number of ministers, generals and diplomats in different Northern German states. Several lines of the family were made Prussian counts, beginning in 1798, and the family received a hereditary seat in the Prussian House of Lords. Most of their properties were expropriated in 1945 in communist East Germany. Their main family estates were:

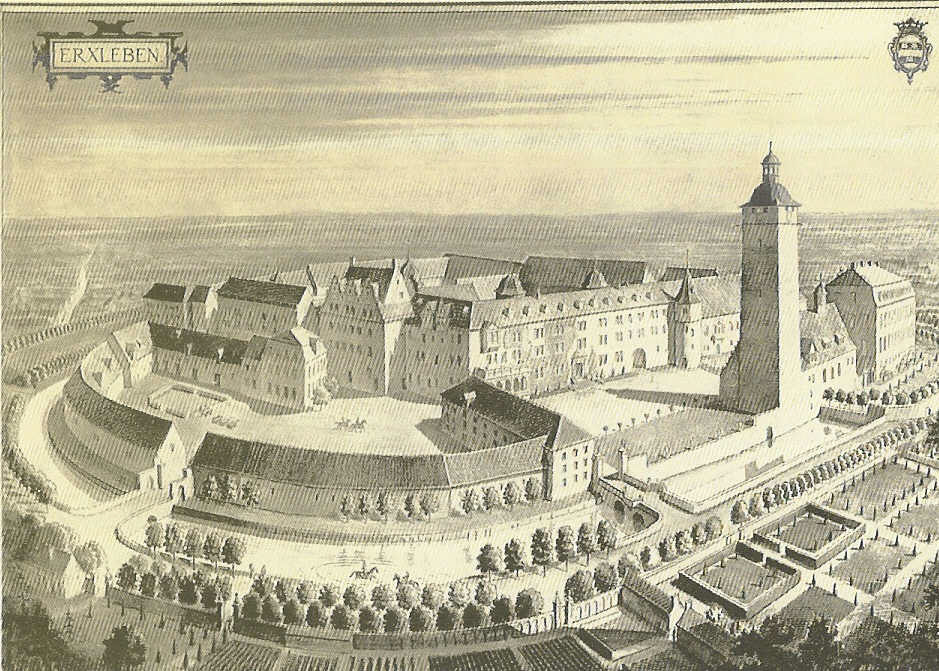
Erxleben Castle

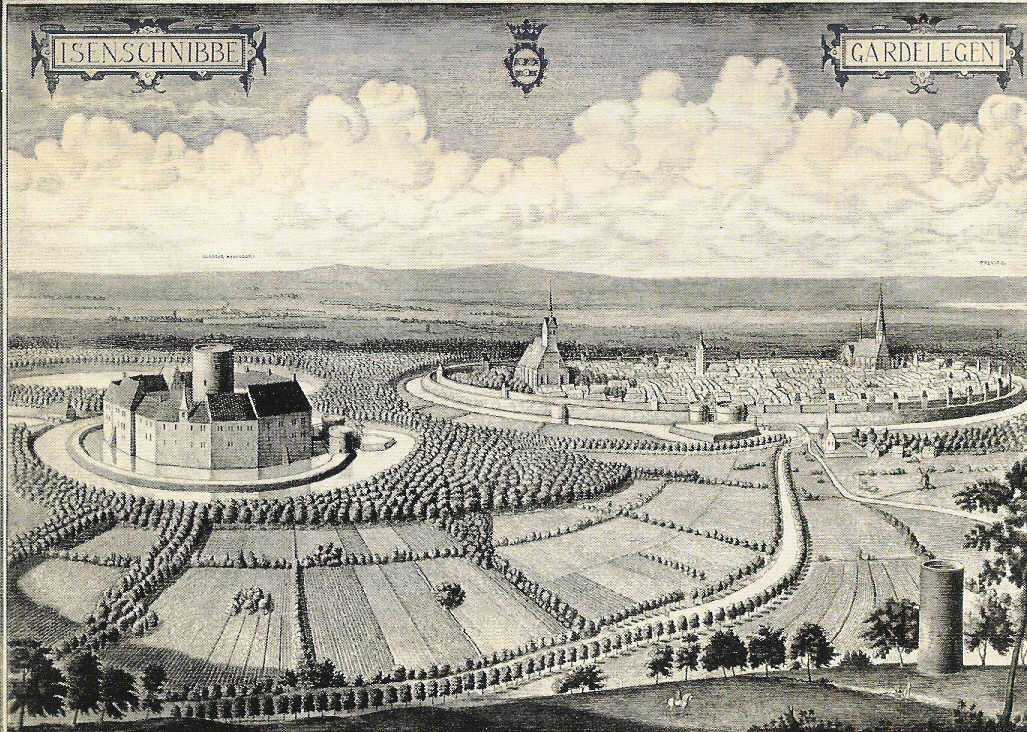
Gardelegen Castle

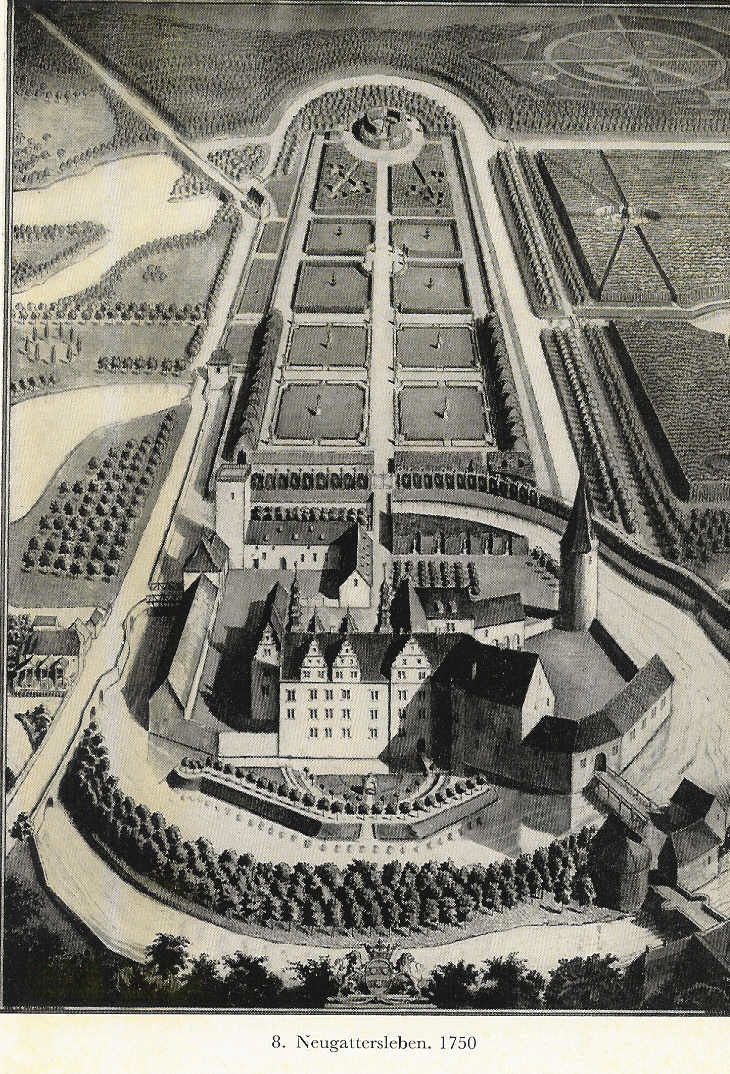
Neugattersleben Castle

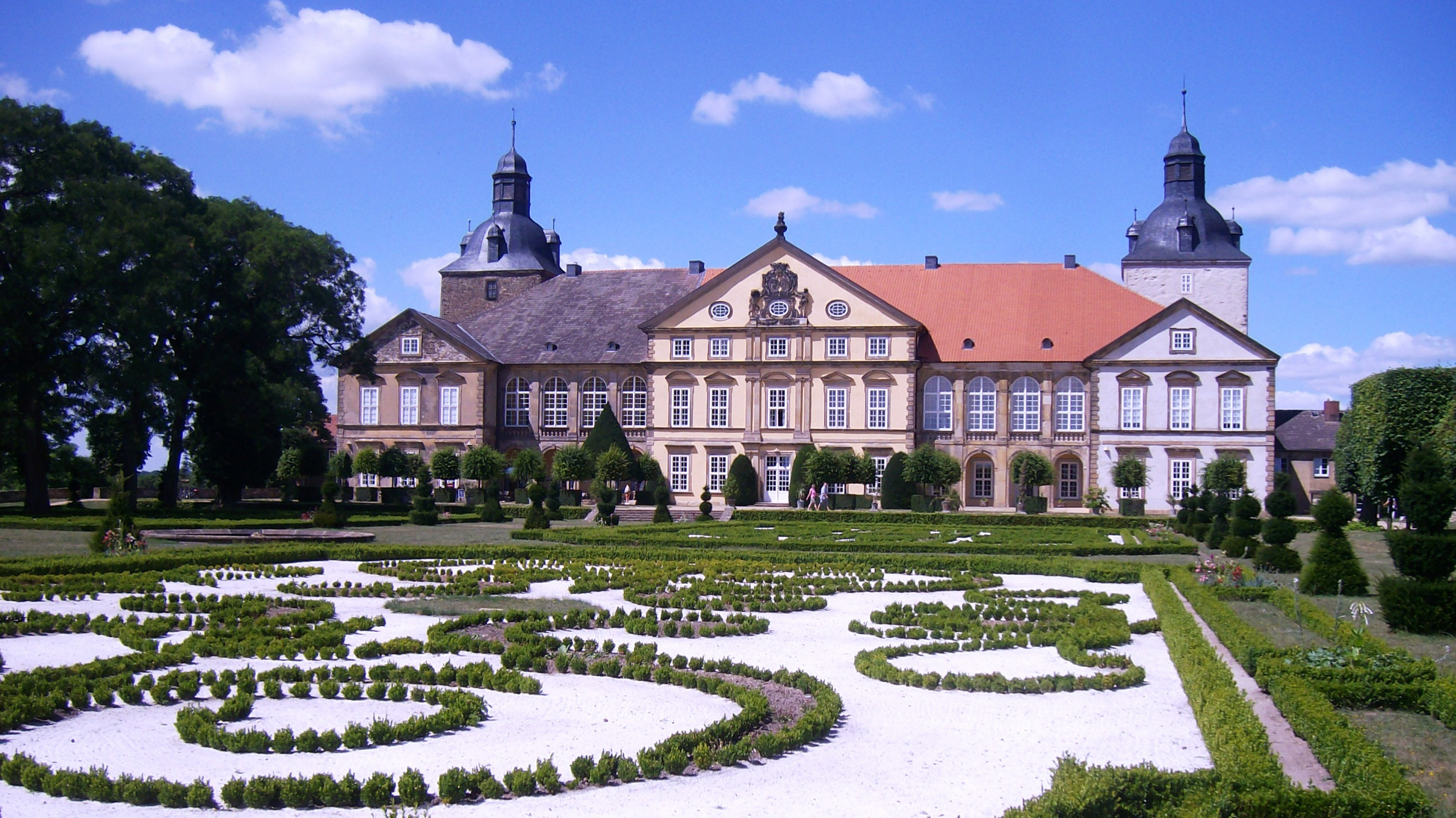
Hundisburg Castle (near Haldensleben)

== Coat of arms ==
The family coat of arms shows in gold two red fesses, the upper one emblazoned with two, the lower one with one silver roses. On the helmet with its red and gold mantling there is an upright, gnarled branch in red and gold, two branches to the right and one to the left, crowned with a silver rose.

== Personalities ==
- Achaz Henry of Alvensleben (1716–1777), Prussian general
- Albert, Count of Alvensleben (1794–1858), Prussian minister of finance
- Albert, Count of Alvensleben-Schönborn (1848–1928), member of the Prussian House of Lords
- Alkmar II of Alvensleben (1841–1898), lieutenant general and commandant of Breslau
- Alkmar of Alvensleben (1874–1946), German doctor
- Andrew of Alvensleben (died 1565), castellan
- Anna Maria of Alvensleben (1659–1724), eldest daughter of Gebhard Christopher of Alvensleben at Erxleben I
- Armgard of Alvensleben (1893–1970), abbess of Heiligengrabe Abbey and managing director of the German Evangelical Railway Mission
- Berthold I of Alvensleben, Bishop of Hildesheim
- Busso of Alvensleben
- Christian of Alvensleben (born 1941), German photographer
- Constantine of Alvensleben (1809–1892), Prussian general
- Edward of Alvensleben (1787–1876), Landrat
- Frederica of Alvensleben, née von Klinglin (1749–1799), actress
- Frederick of Alvensleben (urk. 1301–1308), last Master of the Order of the Templers in Alemannia and Slavonia
- Frederick Joachim of Alvensleben (1833–1912), Landrat
- Frederick John, Count of Alvensleben (1836–1913), ambassador
- Ferdinand, Count of Alvensleben (1803–1889), landowner and member of the Prussian House of Lords
- Gebhard XIV of Alvensleben (erw. 1393–1425), castellan at Gardelegen and governor (‚‘Landeshauptmann‘‘)
- Gebhard XVII of Alvensleben (died 1541), governor (Landeshauptmann)
- Gebhard XXIII of Alvensleben (1584–1627), Governor (‚‘Landeshauptmann‘‘) Beeskow uns Storkow
- Gebhard XXV of Alvensleben (1618–1681), statesman and historian
- Gebhard John I of Alvensleben (1576–1631), lord of the manor and builder of an observatory
- Gebhard Charles Ludolf of Alvensleben (1798–1867), Prussian general
- Gebhard John Achaz of Alvensleben (1764–1840), landowner
- Gebhard Nicholas of Alvensleben (1824–1909), senior master forester
- Gustav of Alvensleben (1803–1881), Prussian general
- Gustav Hermann of Alvensleben (1827–1905), Prussian general
- Gustav Konstantin von Alvensleben (1879–1965), businessman in Vancouver, Canada
- Hans Bodo, Count of Alvensleben-Neugattersleben (1882–1961), landowner and President of the German Gentleman's Club
- Hermann of Alvensleben (1809–1887), Prussian general
- Joachim I of Alvensleben (1514–1588), scholar and reformer
- John Ernest, Count of Alvensleben (1758–1827), cathedral dean and Brunswick minister
- John Frederick II of Alvensleben (1657–1728), Hanoverian minister, builder of Hundisburg Castle
- John Frederick Charles of Alvensleben (1714–1795), British-Hanoverian minister
- John Frederick Charles II of Alvensleben (1778−1831), Prussian general
- John Louis Gebhard of Alvensleben (1816–1895), lord of the manor and musician
- Charles Augustus I of Alvensleben (1661–1697), privy councillor in Hanover and Canon of Magdeburg
- Kathleen King von Alvensleben, architect
- Kuno of Alvensleben (1588–1638), Canon of Magdeburg
- Ludolf of Alvensleben (1844–1912), Prussian major general and lord of the manor
- Ludolf X of Alvensleben (1511–1596), statesman
- Ludolf Augustus Frederick of Alvensleben (1743–1822), royal Prussian major general, commandant of Glaz Fortress and Inspector of the Silesian Army
- Ludolf-Hermann of Alvensleben (1901–1970), Nazi Reichstag MP and lieutenant general in the Waffen SS
- Ludolf Udo of Alvensleben (1852–1923), county deputy and Prussian politician
- Ludwig von Alvensleben (1800-1868), author
- Louis Charles Alexander of Alvensleben (1778–1842), Prussian officer and literary figure in Theodor Fontane's novel Schach von Wuthenow
- Louis of Alvensleben (1805–1869), landowner and member of the Prussian House of Lords
- Louis of Alvensleben (playwright) (1800–1868), German playwright
- Margarethe of Alvensleben (1840–1899), abbess of Heiligengrabe Abbey
- Oscar of Alvensleben (1831–1903), German landscape artist
- Phillip Charles, Count of Alvensleben (1745–1802), Prussian state and cabinet minister
- Professor Reimar von Alvensleben (born 1940), agrarian economist
- Rudolf Anthony of Alvensleben (1688–1737), Hanoverian minister
- Udo Gebhard Ferdinand of Alvensleben (1814–1879), landowner and member of the Prussian House of Lords
- Udo III of Alvensleben (1823–1910), landowner and author
- Udo von Alvensleben from Wittenmoor (1897–1962), German art historian
- Sophia of Alvensleben (1516–1590), abbess of Althaldensleben Abbey
- Valentine of Alvensleben (1529–1594), castellan at Gardelegen and Erxleben
- Werner II of Alvensleben (erw. 1428–1472), castellan at Gardelegen, Electoral Brandenburg councillor and court marshal (Oberhofmarschall)
- Werner VIII of Alvensleben (1802–1877), Prussian general
- Werner, Count of Alvensleben-Neugattersleben (1840–1929), landowner and businessman
- Werner von Alvensleben (1875–1947), merchant and politician
- Wichard von Alvensleben (1902–1982), farmer and forester, Wehrmacht officer, and Knight of the Order of Saint John
- Wichard von Alvensleben (Go player) (1937–2016), lawyer, Go player, Chess player
- Ludolf Jakob von Alvensleben (1899 – 1953) was a German SS-Standartenführer who during the Second World War served as a senior staff member of Operation Reinhard, by which Reichsführer-SS Heinrich Himmler planned to systematically murder the Jews of Europe.

== See also ==
- List of German nobility

== Bibliography ==
- Siegmund Wilhelm Wohlbrück: Geschichtliche Nachrichten von dem Geschlecht von Alvensleben und dessen Gütern. 3 Bände, Berlin 1819–1829. Band I, Band II, Band III
- George Adalbert von Mülverstedt: Codex Diplomaticus Alvenslebianus. Urkundensammlung des Geschlechts von Alvensleben. 4 Bände, Magdeburg 1879, 1882, 1885, 1900.
- Hellmut Kretzschmar: Geschichtliche Nachrichten von dem Geschlecht von Alvensleben seit 1800. Burg 1930
- Udo von Alvensleben-Wittenmoor: Alvenslebensche Burgen und Landsitze. Dortmund 1960.
- Genealogisches Handbuch des Adels, Vol. 53, 1972, Adelslexikon
