= Gustav Konstantin von Alvensleben =

German-Canadian-American entrepreneur

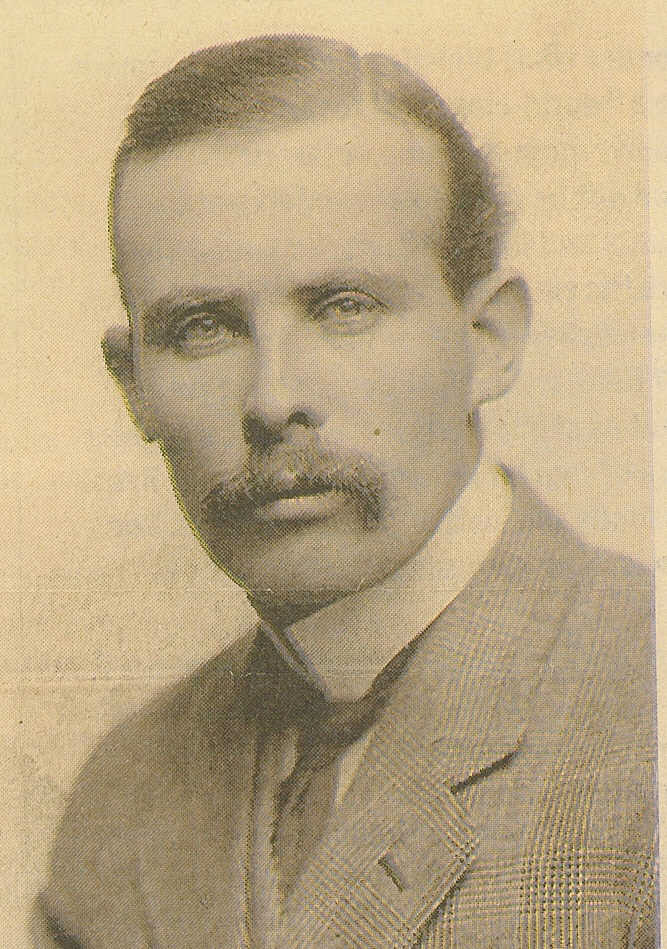
Gustav Konstantin (Gustin) von Alvensleben, also called Alvo von Alvensleben

Gustav Konstantin (Gustin) von Alvensleben, called Alvo von Alvensleben (25 July 1879 in Neugattersleben – October 22, 1965, in Seattle, US) was a German entrepreneur based in Vancouver, British Columbia, Canada, and Seattle, Washington, United States of America.

== Family ==
He was a descendant of the ancient German noble family von Alvensleben and was the third son of Werner von Alvensleben, later Werner von Alvensleben-Neugattersleben and Anna von Veltheim. He had two sisters and four brothers, including the businessman and politician Werner von Alvensleben and later president of the Deutscher Herrenklub (“German Gentlemen's Club”). The widow of his deceased brother Joachim was Armgard of Alvensleben, the abbess of the convent at Heiligengrabe and General Manager of the Protestant mission station. On 4 July 1908, he married a teacher in Vancouver, Edith Westcott. From this marriage there were three children.

== Early life ==
After attending the Institute of Cadets, he initially began a military career that he entered as a lieutenant. He made his unscheduled farewell and migrated to the Americas. This was because after a publicised argument his father no longer wanted to pay a supplementary allowance. After a brief stay in El Salvador, where he was working on the coffee farms of his older brother Joachim, he moved in the summer of 1904 finally to Vancouver (British Columbia) - with only four dollars in cash.

== Life in Vancouver ==
First, he worked as a farm laborer, night watchman, fisherman, hunter and seller of poultry through life, could then buy a boat and after a successful season working on the Fraser River he saved 1500 U.S. dollars. With this money, he continued to make progress forming a real estate and finance company in 1907, which was named Alvensleben Finance and General Investment Company. He switched to credit bilateral large ads in the Vancouver Sun newspaper that he very quickly made known. He was also the cofounder in 1907 of the Vancouver Stock Exchange on which he was active. There on some days more than half the daily turnover were his transactions. His business was assisted by the assumption that as his father was a close friend of Kaiser Wilhelm he was investing his money and representing his business interests. This caused other Germans to wish to invest their funds alongside. In fact most of the Kaiser's investments were in German municipal securities and with the firm of Bleichroder.

== Vancouver real estate boom ==
Vancouver experienced at this time a real estate boom and a strong economic upturn. Alvensleben succeeded in subsequent years, bringing much German and European capital for investment in British Columbia to mobilize and had significantly contributed to this upturn. This time he worked with his brother Werner, who also had emigrated to Vancouver. Around 1912 were in his company directly employs 50 staff and he had stakes in many companies, including Standard and Fish Fertilizer, Standard Fisheries and Whaling, Vancouver Timber and Trading, Queen Charlotte Iceland Fisheries, Indian River Park (Wigwam Inn), German-Canadian Trust Company, Cassiar Mining, Vancouver-Nanaimo Coal Mining and near Seattle the Issaquah & Superior Mining Company across the border.

== Issaquah & Superior Mining ==
The latter was at Issaquah in King County in the U.S. state of Washington. Alvensleben became involved there in a restructuring after the mine through many years of labor disputes had been declared bankrupt. The contemporary accounts stated that the mine facilities have been modernized and more than 500 workers employed. The contemporary chroniclers report that Alvensleben created labor peace with "almost socialistic ideas" he restored it by paying fair wages, humane working conditions and fostering good opportunities for residential care and cooperated sensibly with the unions. The rehabilitation of the mine caused a boom in construction: "In 1913 in Issaquah will be more residential and commercial buildings have been built as in the two decades before".

Alvensleben embodied in this time the "American Dream": He had by vigor, vision and entrepreneurial risk-taking within a few years advanced from a simple day laborer to become a millionaire in high finance. Even within his lifetime he was regarded as a legend and is now considered one of the great figures from the pioneering days of British Columbia's views.

== First World War ==
The outbreak of the First World War led to an abrupt end of his economic empire. His assets were confiscated as enemy property. He had to escape an arrest, leaving Canada and settling in Seattle. Then in 1917 when the United States entered the war, he became suspected as a "spy". He was arrested by a business associate Marshall Latham Bond. He was held in the internment camp at Fort Douglas in the state of Utah, from August 18, 1917 to March 3, 1920. He was acquitted after the war though others in his organization were found guilty. Among his defenders was his arresting officer Marshall Bond. He then worked in real estate business and as a stockbroker in Seattle, but without his previous economic successes, he could not operate on the same scale again. In 1939 he was naturalized as an American citizen.

== See also ==
- House of Alvensleben
