= Eduard Ausfeld =

German archivist and historian

- Heinrich Eduard Ausfeld
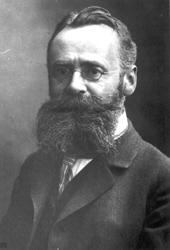
- Born: May 27, 1850; Schnepfenthal bei Gotha
- Died: April 4, 1906 (aged 55); Magdeburg
- Education: University of Marburg
- Occupations: Archivist; historian
- Writing career
- Years active: 1880-1906
- Genre: History

Heinrich Eduard Ausfeld (27 May 1850, Schnepfenthal bei Gotha – 4 April 1906, Magdeburg) was a German archivist and historian.

Following studies at several German universities, he obtained his doctorate in 1880 at the University of Marburg. Subsequently he worked at the Staatsarchiv (state archives) in Idstein (trainee status), Wiesbaden (from 1881), Koblenz (from 1892) and Magdeburg (from 1897). In 1898 he succeeded George Adalbert von Mülverstedt (1825–1914) as director of archives at Magdeburg. In Magdeburg he took part in plans for construction of a new archives building on Augustastraße (now Hegelstraße), which first opened for business in 1908, two years after his death.

Ausfeld was a member of the Historischen Kommission für die Provinz Sachsen und das Herzogtum Anhalt (Historical Commission for the Province of Saxony and the Duchy of Anhalt) and the Geschichtsverein und dem Verein für Nassauische Altertumskunde und Geschichte (Historical Society and the Association of Nassau Archaeology and History).

== Written works ==
- Lambert von Hersfeld und der Zehntstreit zwischen Mainz, Hersfeld und Thüringen, Dissertation 1879; - Lambert of Hersfeld and the tithe dispute between Mainz, Hersfeld and Thuringia.
- "Aktenstücke zur Geschichte der Reformation in Halle", in: GeschBll 34, 1899, 163–189; - Official documents on the history of the Reformation in Halle.
- Hof- und Haushaltung der letzten Grafen von Henneberg, 1901; - Court and household of the last Count of Henneberg.
- "Über die Inventarisierung der nichtstaatlichen Archive in der Provinz Sachsen", in: Korrespondenzblatt 49, 1901, 207ff.; - On the inventory of non archives in the Province of Saxony.
- Übersicht über die Bestände des K. Staatsarchivs zu Coblenz, 1903; - Overview of the holdings of the K. State Archives at Koblenz.
- Das Stadtarchiv zu Erfurt und seine neuesten Erwerbungen, 1905; - City Archives of Erfurt and its recent acquisitions.
- "Soziale Zustände in Staßfurt zu Anfang des 17. Jahrhunderts", in: GeschBll 40, 1905, 61–72; - Social conditions in Stassfurt to the beginning of the 17th Century.
- Regesten zur Geschichte des Klosters Anrode bei Mühlhausen in Thüringen 1262–1735, 1906; - Calendar entries on the history of the monastery at Anrode near Mühlhausen in Thuringia, 1262–1735.
