= Hermann Fulda =

German theologian

- Born: Johann Julius Christian Hermann Fulda; Schochwitz
- Died: Dammendorf
- Alma mater: Martin Luther University Halle-Wittenberg
- Occupation: Theologian, pastor

Johann Julius Christian Hermann Fulda (14 May 1800 in Schochwitz near Halle – 25 February 1883 in Dammendorf) was a German Lutheran theologian and pastor in Dammendorf between 1827 and 1880.

== Biography ==
He was the son of the pious vicar Christian Fulda (1768–1854). He began his education in a Latin school in Halle, then in 1819–1823 he studied at Martin Luther University of Halle-Wittenberg. Until 1827, when he was ordained, he gave a lecture in a public school at a local orphanage. From 1827 to 1880 he was a pastor in Dammendorf.

As a theologian, he represented original beliefs by questioning commonly accepted views. In 1878, on the basis of his research, in his book Das Kreuz und die Kreuzigung ("Cross and Crucifixion") he expressed the view that Jesus was not executed on the cross, but on a simple execution pile without a bar.

He died in Dammendorf on 24 February 1883.

== Works ==
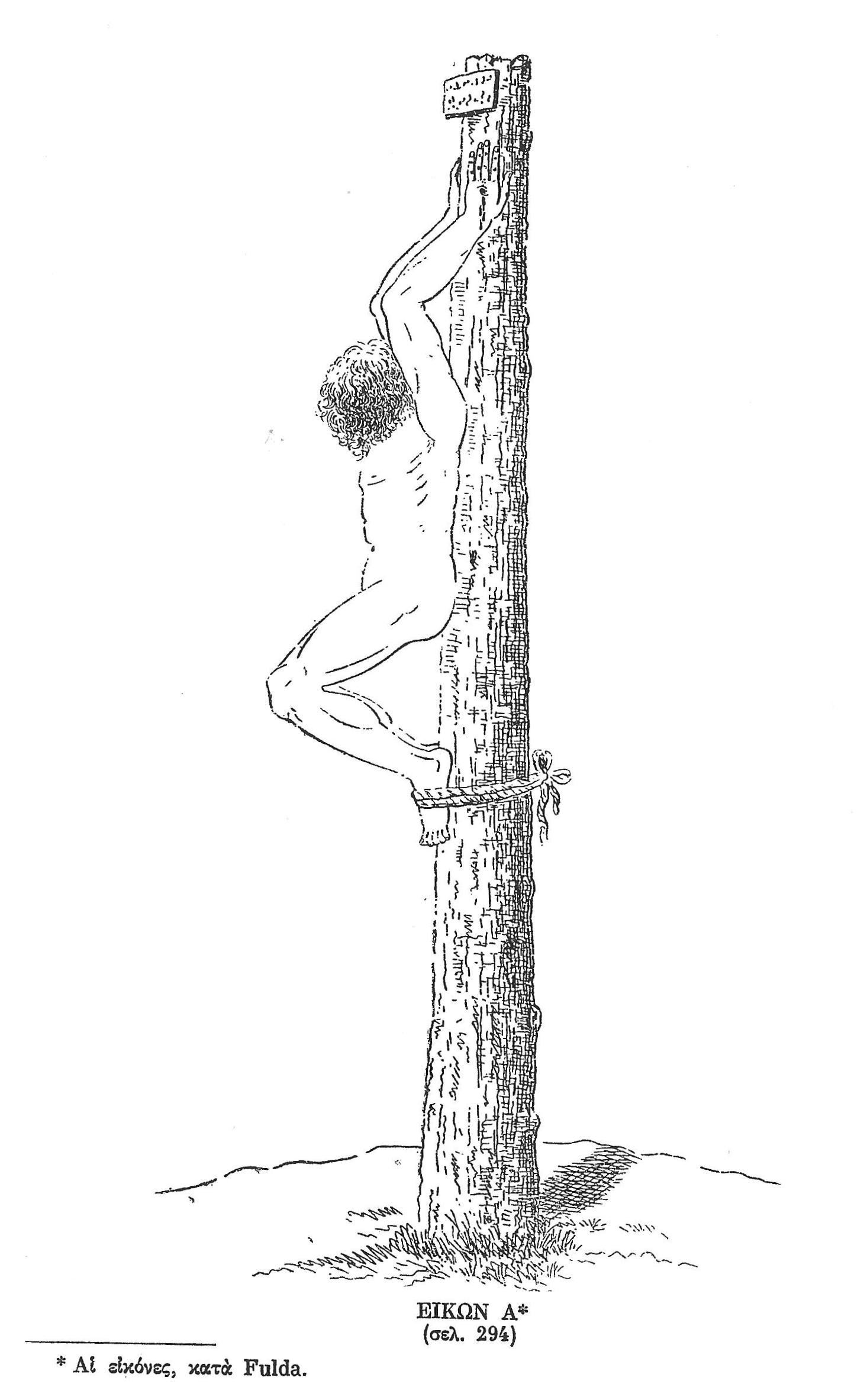
Frontispiece of Das Kreuz und die Kreuzigung as reproduced in Leonidas Filippidis, Ιστορία της Εποχής της Καινής Διαθήκης εξ απόψεως Παγκοσμίου και Πανθρησκειακής (Athens, 1958) p. 979

- Griechische lieder übersetzt aus deutsche Originalen, ein heitres Vocabel-Buch zur Einübung der gangbarsten Wörter und Formen für Anfänger im Griechischen; nebst einem etymologischen Wörterbuche, Halle 1867.
- Das Kreuz und die Kreuzigung. Eine antiquarische Untersuchung nebst Nachweis der vielen seit Lipsius verbreiteten Irrthümer. Zugleich vier Excurse über verwandte Gegenstände, Wrocław 1878.
- Der Glaube an die Einheit Gottes, seine Entwicklung aus heidnischen und politischen Elementen und seine Läuterungsstufen. Ein culturhistorischer Versuch und ohne Rücksicht auf dogmatische Satzungen, Hagen i. W. / Lipsk 1882.
