= Eichenbarleben =

- Ortsteil of Hohe Börde
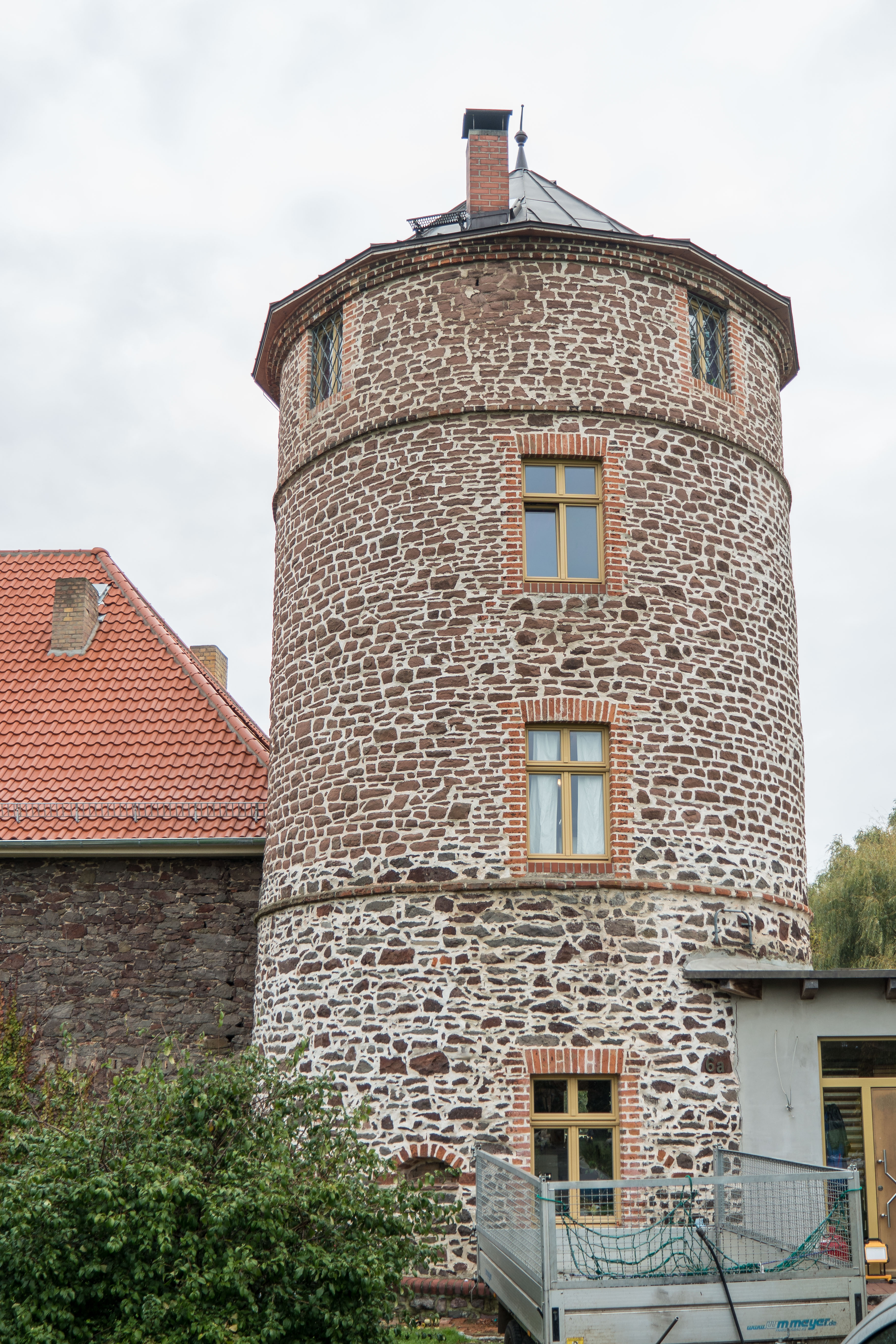

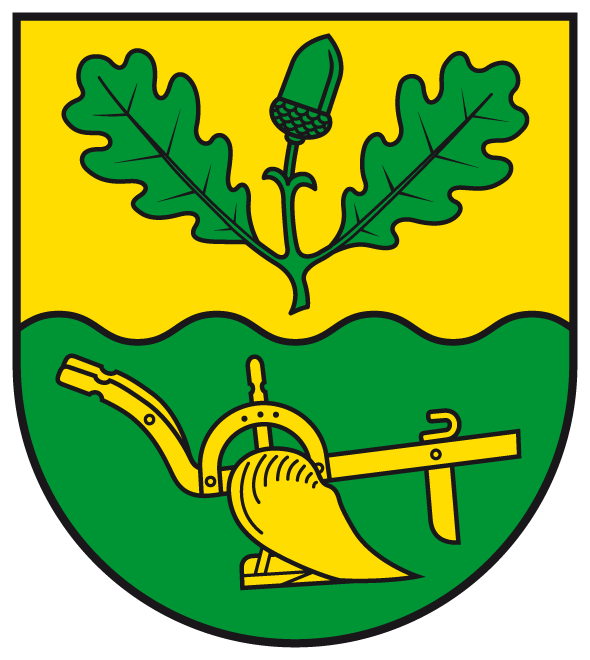
- Coat of arms
- Interactive map of Eichenbarleben
- Location within Germany Location within Saxony-Anhalt
- Coordinates: 52°10′0″N 11°23′58″E
- Country: Germany
- State: Saxony-Anhalt
- District: Börde
- Municipality: Hohe Börde

Area
  - Total: 11.66 km^{2} (4.50 sq mi)
- Elevation: 120 m (390 ft)

Population (2006-12-31)
  - Total: 1,169
  - Density: 100.3/km^{2} (259.7/sq mi)
- Time zone: UTC+01:00 (CET)
  - Summer (DST): UTC+02:00 (CEST)
- Postal codes: 39167
- Dialling codes: 039206
- Vehicle registration: BK

Eichenbarleben is a village and a former municipality in the Börde district in Saxony-Anhalt, Germany. From 1807 to 1813, Eichenbarleben (Kanton Eichenbarleben, District of Neuhaldensleben, Departement der Elbe) belonged to the Kingdom of Westphalia, from 1816 to 1944 to the Province of Saxony (District of Wolmirstedt). Since 1 January 2010, it is part of the municipality Hohe Börde.

== Notable residents ==
- Gustav von Alvensleben (1803–1881), general
- Constantin von Alvensleben (1809–1892), general
