= Neugattersleben =

- Stadtteil of Nienburg
- Interactive map of Neugattersleben
- Location within Germany Location within Saxony-Anhalt
- Coordinates: 51°51′N 11°42′E
- Country: Germany
- State: Saxony-Anhalt
- District: Salzlandkreis
- Town: Nienburg

Area
  - Total: 13.57 km^{2} (5.24 sq mi)
- Elevation: 74 m (243 ft)

Population (2006-12-31)
  - Total: 909
  - Density: 67.0/km^{2} (173/sq mi)
- Time zone: UTC+01:00 (CET)
  - Summer (DST): UTC+02:00 (CEST)
- Postal codes: 06429
- Dialling codes: 034721
- Website: www.neugattersleben.de

Neugattersleben is a village and a former municipality in the district Salzlandkreis, in Saxony-Anhalt, Germany. Since 1 January 2010, it is part of the town Nienburg.

Neugattersleben Castle was owned by the House of Alvensleben from 1573 until its expropriation in 1945 by communist East Germany.

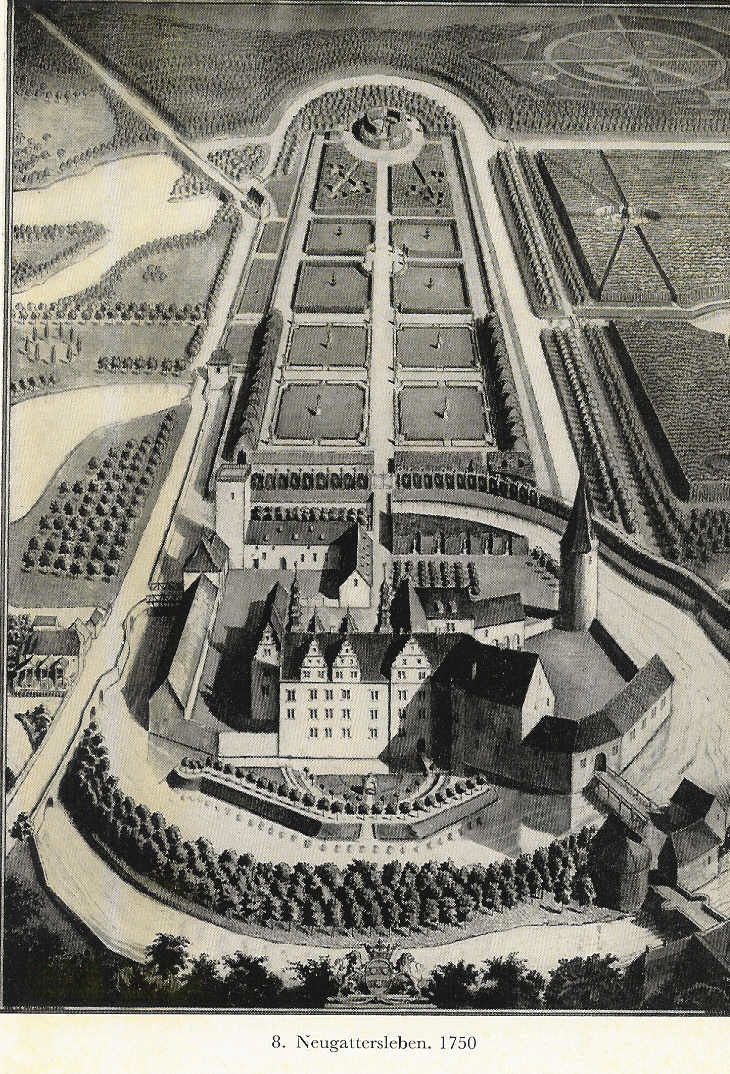
Neugattersleben Castle (around 1750 - drafted by Anco Wigboldus)

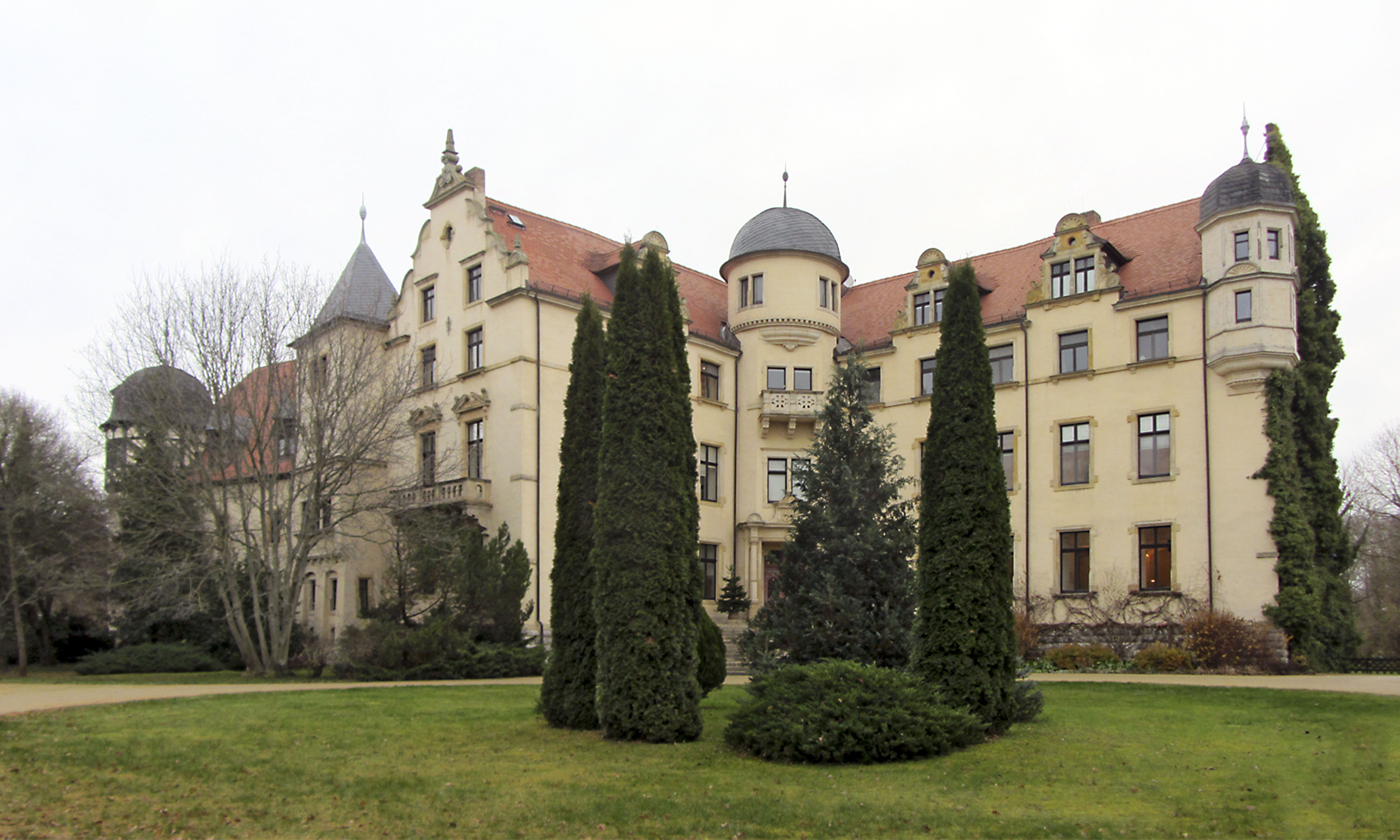
Neugattersleben Castle

== Notable people ==
- Gebhard XXV. von Alvensleben (1618-1681), German politician and historian
- Werner von Alvensleben (1875-1947), German businessman and politician
- Gustav Konstantin von Alvensleben (1879-1965), German-American entrepreneur
