= Schochwitz Castle =

Central German palace

Coordinates: 51°31′46″N 11°45′9″E

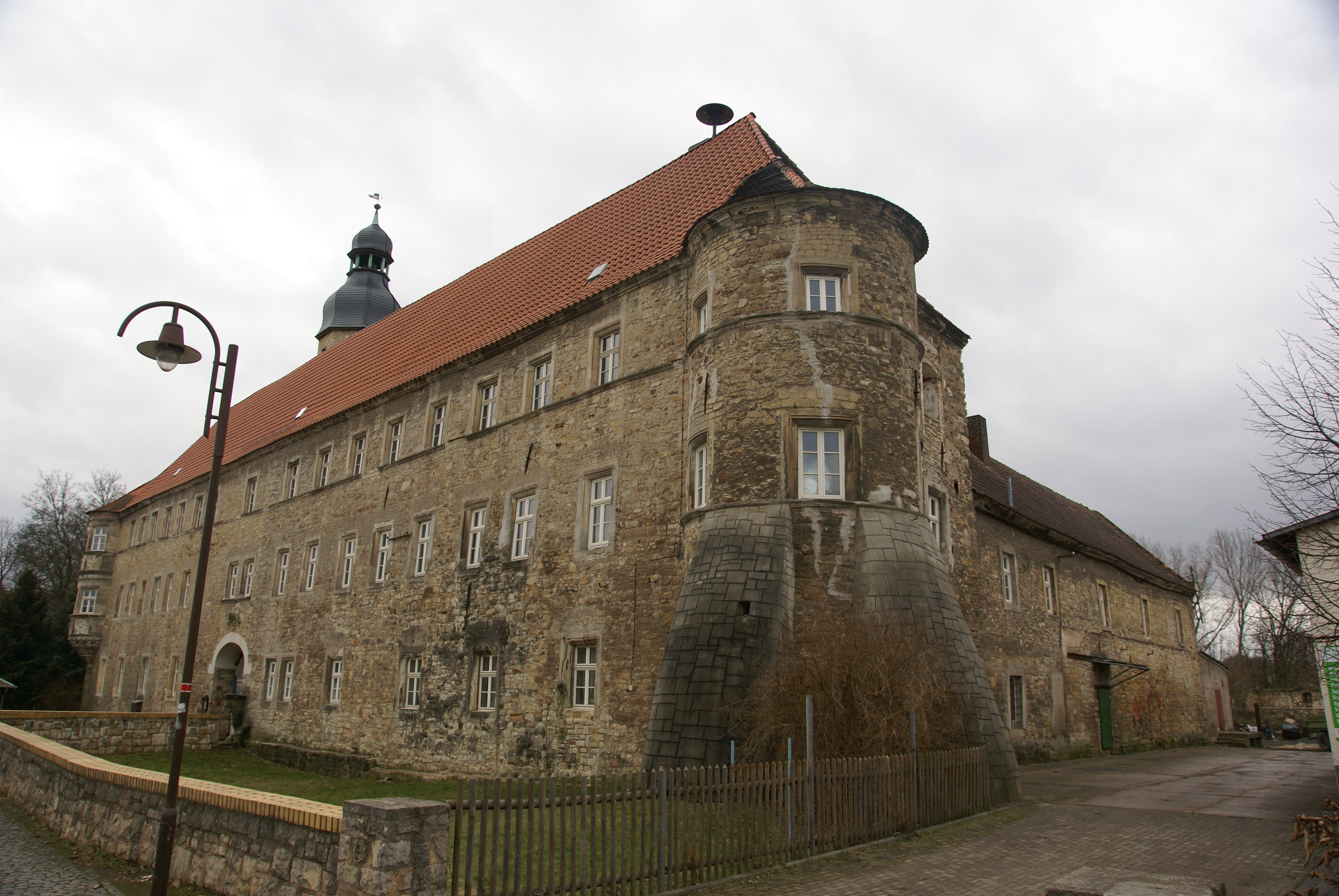
Schochwitz Castle

The Schochwitz castle, located in Schochwitz, Germany (17 km from Halle (Saale) in the German state of Saxony-Anhalt) was built in the 12th century. Today it serves as a hotel.

Earliest sources mention a castle about 1133 in conjunction with Odalricus de Scochwize who was the owner of the castle. Later the castle was owned by Friedrich von Merseburg, a clergymen. In 1565 the dynasty von der Schulenburg inherited the castle. Between 1601 and 1606 a renaissance castle was built at the site under the reign of Lewin von der Schulenburg. Gebhart von Alvensleben purchased Schochwitz castel in 1783 and it remained in that family's possession. The last owner was Ludolf-Hermann von Alvensleben. After the war, the castle came into state possession. It was purchased in 2004 by Richard James Welsh, renovated, and turned into a holistic healing center.

== In popular culture ==
The castle was mentioned in one episode of the German RTL II TV reality TV show Die Schnäppchenhäuser - Der Traum vom Eigenheim (The bargain houses - The dream of one's own home).
