= Gustav von Alvensleben =

Prussian general (1803–1881)

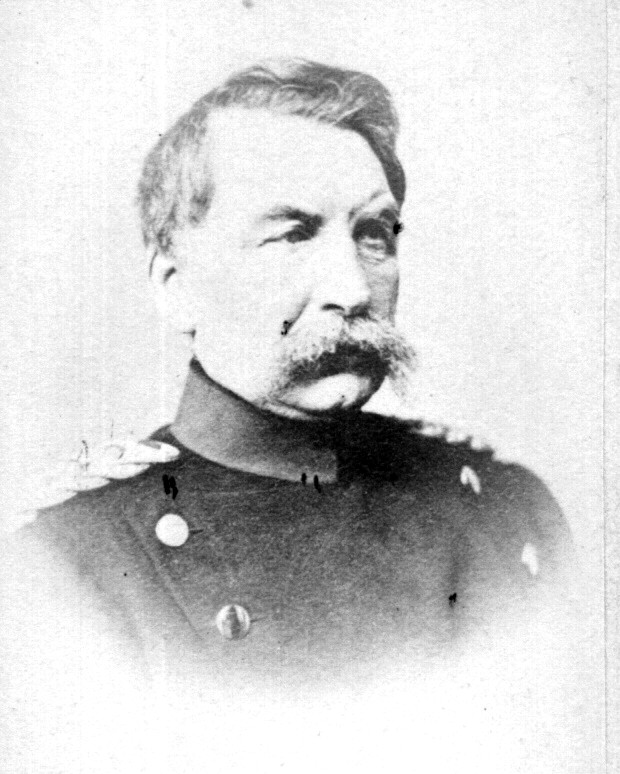
- Born: 30 September 1803; Eichenbarleben, Prussia
- Died: 30 June 1881 (aged 77); Gernrode, Imperial Germany
- Relatives: Constantin von Alvensleben
- Military career
- Allegiance: Kingdom of Prussia (German Empire) Imperial Germany
- Branch: Prussian Army
- Service years: 1821-72
- Rank: General der Infanterie
- Commands: IV Corps
- Conflicts: Austro-Prussian War; Franco-Prussian War
- Awards: Pour le Mérite

Gustav von Alvensleben (30 September 1803 – 30 June 1881) was a Prussian General der Infanterie.

== Biography ==
=== Early life ===
Alvensleben was born in Eichenbarleben in 1803, to the Low German noble family of Alvensleben. His parents were Gebhard Johann von Alvensleben (1773–1856), a Lieutenant-Colonel in the Royal Prussian Army, and his kinswoman Caroline Friederike Eleonore von Alvensleben (1773–1826). Gustav had four brothers; two of them, Werner and Constantin, would go on to serve in the military as generals.

=== Military career ===
Alvensleben joined the Prussian Army in 1821, serving in the Kaiser Alexander Guards Grenadiers Regiment No. 1 as a Second Lieutenant. In 1849, Alvensleben became Chief of Staff of the Prussian Corps in the insurrection in Baden and, in 1850, Chief of Staff of the VIII Army Corps. He went on to become the military governor of the Prussian Rhine Province and Westphalia in 1854, became a major-general in 1858, and the personal adjutant of King William I of Prussia in 1861. In this position he signed the Alvensleben Convention with Russia to co-ordinate Russian and Prussian politics throughout the Polish January Uprising.

Having served in the Royal headquarters in the Austro-Prussian War of 1866, Alvensleben led the peace negotiations with George V of Hanover. On 30 October 1866 he took over the command of the IV Corps. In 1868 Alvensleben was promoted to General der Infanterie and commanded the IV Corps in the Battles of Beaumont and Sedan during the Franco-Prussian War.

Alvensleben retired on 10 October 1872, and died unmarried and childless on 30 June 1881 in Gernrode, Saxony-Anhalt, Germany.

== Honours and awards ==
- Prussia:
  - Knight of the Red Eagle, 4th Class with Swords, 1849; Grand Cross (50 years) with Oak Leaves and Swords on Ring, 18 July 1871
  - Commander's Cross of the Royal House Order of Hohenzollern, 1861; with Star, 22 March 1863; with Swords, 1866
  - Service Award Cross
  - Iron Cross (1870), 1st Class with 2nd Class on Black Band
  - Pour le Mérite (military), 16 June 1871
- Anhalt: Grand Cross of the Order of Albert the Bear, 18 November 1864
- Baden:
  - Knight of the Military Karl-Friedrich Merit Order, 1849
  - Commander of the Zähringer Lion, 2nd Class, 1849
- Bavaria:
  - Grand Cross of the Merit Order of St. Michael, 1864
  - Grand Cross of Merit of the Bavarian Crown, 1865
  - Commander of the Military Order of Max Joseph, 18 October 1870
- Brunswick: Grand Cross of the Order of Henry the Lion
- (Saxe-Coburg and Gotha) (Duchy of Saxe-Altenburg) (Saxe-Meiningen) Ernestine duchies: Commander of the Saxe-Ernestine House Order, 1st Class, January 1861; Grand Cross
- (Principality of Schaumburg-Lippe) Lippe: Cross of Honour of the House Order of Lippe, 2nd Class
- Saxony:
  - Grand Cross of the Albert Order, 1867
  - Commander of the Military Order of St. Henry, 1st Class, 1870
- Schwarzburg: Princely Schwarzburg Cross of Honour, 1st Class
- Württemberg: Grand Cross of the Württemberg Crown, 1864
- Austria:
  - Commander of the Royal Hungarian Order of St. Stephen, 1859
  - Grand Cross of the Imperial Order of Leopold, 1864
- France: Grand Officer of the Legion of Honour
- Netherlands: Grand Cross of the Netherlands Lion
- Luxembourg: Grand Officer of the Oak Crown
- Portugal: Grand Cross of the Royal Military Order of St. Benedict of Aviz
- Russia:
  - Knight of St. George, 4th Class, 27 December 1870
  - Knight of St. Alexander Nevsky
  - Knight of St. Vladimir, 2nd Class

== See also ==
- House of Alvensleben
