= Paul Wilhelm Schmidt =

German theologian (1845–1917)

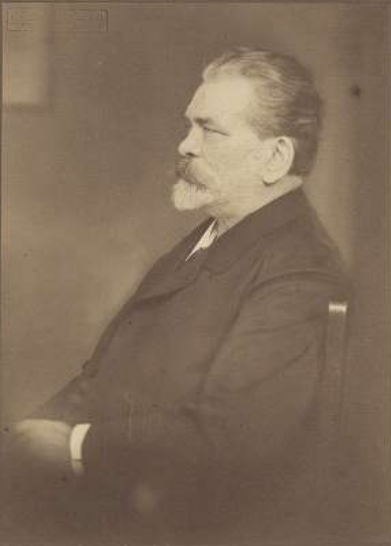
- Born: 25 December 1845
- Died: 12 June 1917 (aged 71)
- Occupation: Theologian, editing staff
- Employer: Humboldt University of Berlin; University of Basel

Paul Wilhelm Schmidt (born 25 December 1845 in Berlin; died 12 June 1917 in Riehen near Basel) was a German theologian who taught mostly in Basel. To this day he is considered one of the most important Swiss representatives of the liberal Protestant direction in theology and church at the end of the 19th and beginning of the 20th century.

== Life ==
Paul Schmidt was the second oldest son of the first teacher at the French Cathedral School Berlin, Eusebius Schmidt and - like this one from Woldenberg in the Neumark - Auguste Meyer (1819-1871) and the brother of the Berlin grammar school professor Johannes E. S. Schmidt (1841-1925). Together with his four siblings, Schmidt grew up in the rooms of the French Cathedral, in whose rooms facing Jägerstraße his father had been assigned a company flat. He attended the French Cathedral School and then the French Grammar School, where he passed the school-leaving examination at the age of 16. His brother Johannes describes him as a highly gifted, "precocious" boy - also in singing and acting - "who, as a four-year-old, trotted to school alongside his father, who was quick to stride.

After the Abitur Schmidt studied theology and philosophy at the universities of Berlin and Halle (Saale). In 1865 he received his doctorate in Halle. In 1869 he habilitated at the Berlin theological faculty for the subject New Testament. From 1869 to 1876 he was a member of the Berlin faculty as a private lecturer. As editor of the liberal Protestant church newspaper, however, he then "in youthful zeal attacked not only the ecclesiastical conditions of the capital, but also the professors of the theological faculty so sharply that he forfeited the prospect of a professorship in Berlin".

In 1875 Schmidt was appointed professor of New Testament Studies at the Faculty of Theology of the University of Basel. This appointment was not uncontroversial; in a contemporary documentation it was said that the professorship had been transferred to Schmidt "by the government council in disregard of a majority request of the curatorship in consideration of the freer direction of Mr. Schmidt corresponding to the majority of the local population." In 1885 the Faculty of Theology of the University of Strasbourg awarded him the dignity of a Doctor of theology. In 1887/88 he was rector of the university and from 1896 to 1905 member of the cantonal education council. He also devoted his services to the municipal humanistic grammar school from 1896 to 1911 as inspection president. In 1893 he declined a call to Zurich. A few years before the outbreak of the First World War, he took on Swiss citizenship. In his personality Schmidt is often described as a "warm-hearted, supportive teacher". "Tending to be uncompromising in his polemical debates, he also had integrative qualities." Schmidt held office in Basel for more than four decades until his death in June 1917.

== Writings ==
- Spinoza und Schleiermacher. Die Geschichte ihrer Systeme und ihr gegenseitiges Verhältniß. Ein dogmengeschichtlicher Versuch, Berlin 1868
- Protestanten-Bibel Neuen Testaments. Unter Mitwirkung von Dr. Bruch et al. herausgegeben von Paul Wilhelm Schmidt und Franz von Holtzendorff, Leipzig 1872 (Dritte Auflage Leipzig 1879)
  - Übersetzung: A short Protestant commentary on the books of the New Testament. With general and special introductions. Edited by Paul Wilhelm Schmidt and Franz von Holtzendorff. Translated from the third edition of the German by Francis Henry Jones. Three volumes, London 1882/1883/1884
- Über die Abnahme des theologischen Studiums. Bericht, vorgetragen auf dem 8. Deutschen Protestantentage in Wiesbaden, Berlin 1874
- Was trennt »die beiden Richtungen« in der evangelischen Kirche? Ein Beitrag zur Schätzung der kirchlichen Gegensätze, Berlin 1880
- Neutestamentliche Hyperkritik an dem jüngsten Angriff gegen die Aechtheit des Philipperbriefes auf ihre Methode hin untersucht. Nebst einer Erklärung des Briefes, Berlin 1880
- Anmerkungen über die Komposition der Offenbarung Johannis, Freiburg im Breisgau 1891
- Die Geschichte Jesu, Freiburg im Breisgau 1899 (und weitere Ausgaben)
- Die Apostelgeschichte bei De Wette-Overbeck und bei Adolf Harnack, Basel 1910
- Das freie Christentum, sein kirchliches Recht und seine religiöse Aufgabe, Berlin 1913

== Literature ==
- Ernst Staehelin: Karl Barths Vorgänger auf dem Basler Lehrstuhl für systematische Theologie. In: Theologische Zeitschrift 12 (1956), S. 162–187
- Matthias Wolfes (2001). "Schmidt, Paul Wilhelm". In Bautz, Traugott (ed.). Biographisch-Bibliographisches Kirchenlexikon (BBKL) (in German). Vol. 18. Herzberg: Bautz. cols. 1254–1260. ISBN 3-88309-086-7.
- Matthias Wolfes (2007). "Schmidt, Paul Wilhelm". Neue Deutsche Biographie (in German). Vol. 23. Berlin: Duncker & Humblot. pp. 212–213. (full text online).
- Johannes E. S. Schmidt: Die Französische Domschule und das Französische Gymnasium zu Berlin. Schülererinnerungen 1848–1861. Herausgegeben und kommentiert von Rüdiger R. E. Fock. Verlag Dr. Kovac, Hamburg 2008, ISBN 978-3-8300-3478-0.
