= Kathleen King von Alvensleben =

American architect

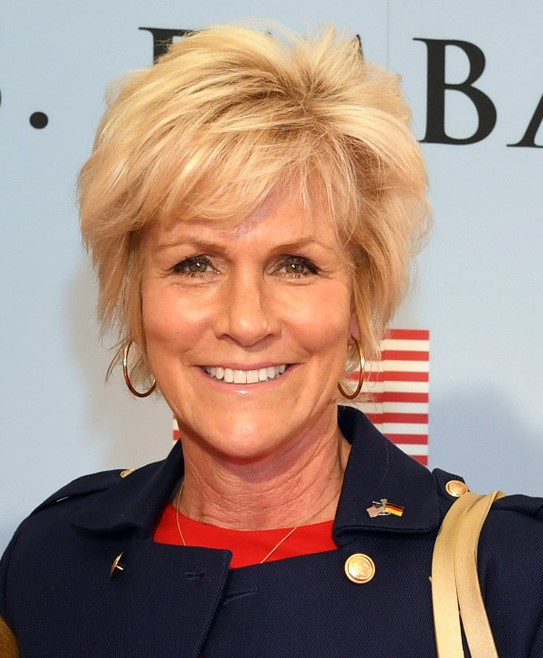
- Born: December 5, 1969 (age 55); Laredo, (Texas)
- Occupation(s): Architect, Fundraiser

Kathleen King von Alvensleben is an American-German architect, charity fundraiser and member of the House of Alvensleben, who has realised several major construction projects in Berlin, and has been an advocate and fundraiser for the reconstruction of the Berlin Palace.

== Career ==
Von Alvensleben was educated at Arizona State University and Technical University of Munich. She started her career as an architect in London. Following the German reunification, von Alvensleben moved to Berlin for the opportunities the fall of the Berlin Wall had opened. Among the notable projects she undertook are the restructurings of the International Trade Center ("Internationales Handelszentrum") and the Kosmos Movie Theater.

In 1992, she co-founded the Berlin City Palace Sponsoring Association ("Förderverein Berliner Schloss") and acted as board member for several years. Von Alvensleben was particularly involved with raising funds from wealthy American donors. Over the course of years several charity dinners were organized mainly in New York and other parts of the United States. Her activities received support from multiple prominent personalities, including former US-president George W. Bush, former Secretary of State Henry Kissinger, Nobel Prize laureate Günter Blobel and former US-ambassador to Germany John B. Emerson.

== Personal life ==
Kathleen von Alvensleben has two children.
