= Ludolf von Alvensleben (Major General) =

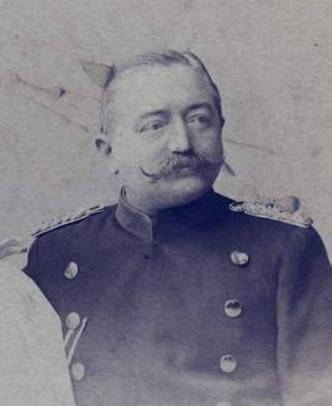

Ludolf Arthur Herman von Alvensleben (11 November 1844 – 8 December 1912) was a Prussian major general from the German noble family von Alvensleben who was born in Potsdam and died in Halle an der Saale. He was married to Antoinette, Baroness of Ricou (1870–1950), with whom he had four children including SS general Ludolf von Alvensleben, an escaped Nazi war criminal (1901–1970).

He fought in the Second Schleswig War against Denmark in 1864, the Austro-Prussian War against the Austrian Empire in 1866 and in the Franco-Prussian War (19 July 1870 – 10 May 1871) against the Second French Empire of Napoleon III.

He inherited Castle Schochwitz from his father. The castle had been in the family since its purchase by Gebhart von Alvensleben in 1783.
