= Werner von Alvensleben =

German businessman and politician (1875–1947)

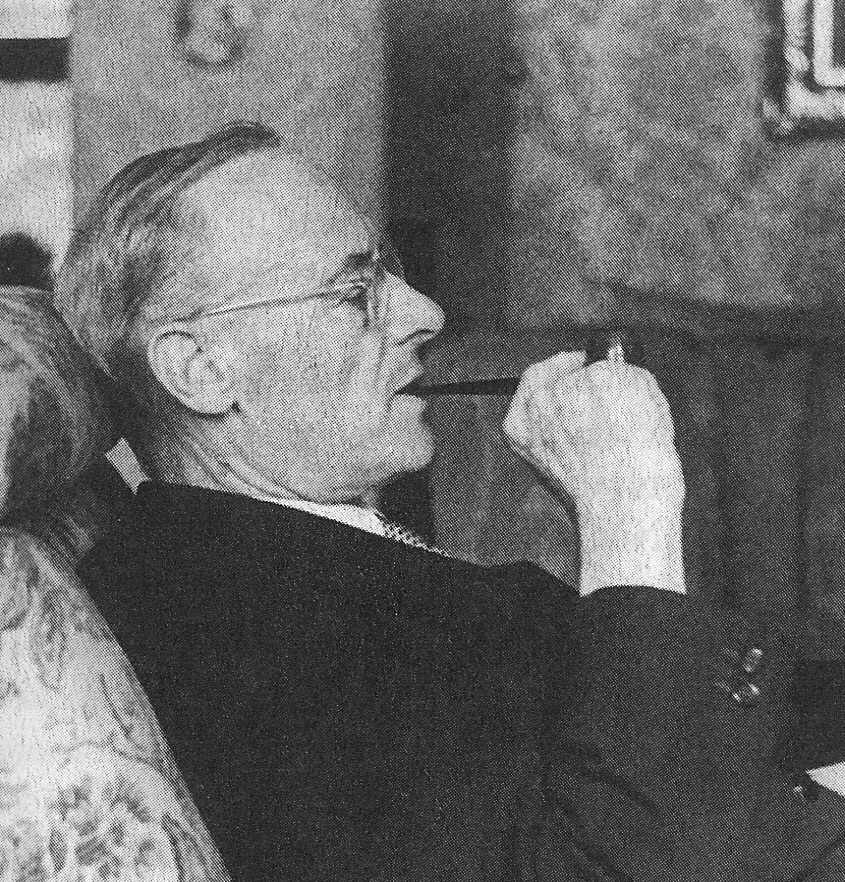
- Born: 4 July 1875; Neugattersleben, Province of Saxony, Kingdom of Prussia, German Empire
- Died: 30 June 1947 (aged 71); Bremen-Vegesack, Bremen, Germany
- Occupations: Businessman; Politician

Werner von Alvensleben (4 July 1875 – 30 June 1947) was a German businessman and politician.

== Biography ==
He was the second son of Werner Graf von Alvensleben-Neugattersleben (1840–1929) and Anna von Veltheim (1853–1897). His younger brother Bodo Graf von Alvensleben-Neugattersleben was later to become the president of the German Gentlemen's Club (Deutscher Herrenklub). He joined the army after studying law, became second lieutenant in Infantry Regiment No. 24 and attended the Prussian War Academy in 1904–1905. He then resigned from military service, fell out with his father who disinherited him, and travelled to Vancouver, British Columbia, Canada. This is where his younger brother, Gustav Konstantin von Alvensleben, was already living, who had worked his way up from a simple workman to become a successful entrepreneur. In 1909 he married Alexandra Gräfin von Einsiedel (1888–1947). Three daughters, Alexandra, Armgard and Anna Caroline Harriet were born to this marriage, as well as a son named Werner. From this time on he worked as a businessman in export and financial transactions.

During World War I von Alvensleben was awarded the Iron Cross 1st Class, later he became an orderly officer in the Army Group Gallwitz, aide-de-camp to Hermann von Eichhorn, the military governor of Ukraine, and finally personal aide-de-camp of the Kaiser to Pavlo Skoropadskyi (1873–1945), the Hetman of Ukraine, in Kiev. In this capacity he championed independence for Ukraine.

After the war, von Alvensleben became increasingly involved in politics alongside his professional activities. Although he had been a member of the German Conservative Party before the war, he did not join a political party afterwards, preferring to work in the background above all. Nor did he belong to the gentlemen's club of which his younger brother Bodo was the president. In June 1930 the Deutscher Bund zum Schutz der abendländischen Kultur (German Union for the Protection of Occidental Culture) was founded and he became its president. Its aim was to funnel all conservative energies into one comprehensive conservative party, planning to have a thorough reform of the ‘estates’ in the state and the economy. Politically he was a member of the inner circle surrounding the later German Reich defence minister and Reich Chancellor General Kurt von Schleicher, and also had close contact with the supreme army commander, Colonel General Kurt Freiherr von Hammerstein-Equord.

After Adolf Hitler came to power in 1933, von Alvensleben belonged to the conservative opposition. He refused to swear the oath of allegiance to Hitler prescribed by law as he was a captain of the reserve. Prior to the "Night of the Long Knives", the purge of the SA leadership around Ernst Röhm and the conservative opposition on 30 June 1934, a hunting companion of earlier times, Graf von Helldorf , a member of the SA and one of the organizers of the purge (who eventually turned against Hitler and was executed after the 20 July plot) warned von Alvensleben to spend the coming weekend at his hunting lodge, as he then did, escaping certain assassination; it was thereupon that he was first condemned to death. He had been the go-between for Schleicher to Hitler and had made fun of Hitler for his ambition to be the new Napoleon. At Buchenwald concentration camp he was tortured, especially for the following incident, relayed by his grandson, Michael Roloff:

A guard asked whether he, A., still placed people in classes. Whereupon Opa A. said, Yes he did. And that there were three classes. The first class consisted of people who had been in prison, the second of those who were in prison, and the third of those who were on their way to prison; and to the third class, my dear fellow, is the one to which you belong. Whereupon the beating commences and I suppose it's worth being beaten for such a fine story.

In connection with the Night of the Long Knives and the murder of Schleicher on 30 June 1934, Hitler said in a speech to the Reichstag on 13 July 1934, "Röhm became connected with General von Schleicher through the mediation of a thoroughly corrupt swindler, a Mr. v A." By this he meant Werner von Alvensleben who was sentenced to several months’ imprisonment on 30 June 1934 but was not executed—as had actually been intended. When he was released he was ordered not to leave Neugattersleben unless he had permission from the Gestapo. Later on he had contact with Carl Friedrich Goerdeler and Ludwig August Theodor Beck via Hammerstein and was—as Rudolf Pechel writes in his book Deutscher Widerstand (German Resistance)—partially privy to the coup plans at the end of 1941. He had already been arrested and charged again for different reasons before 20 July 1944. At the trial before the Volksgerichtshof on 1 February 1945 it was not possible to prove that he had known about the assassination plans, but he was sentenced to two years’ imprisonment for defeatist statements made during a tea party in August 1943, whereby his age and failing health mitigated the punishment.

In April 1945, he was freed from Magdeburg prison by American troops. As Neugattersleben had since become part of the Soviet occupied zone, he went to live with his daughter in Bremen-Vegesack where he died on 30 June 1947.

Werner von Alvensleben had one son, also named Werner, who was responsible for the attempted assassination of the Austrian Heimwehrfuehrer Dr. Richard Steidle in June 1933.

== Bibliography ==
- Hellmut Kretzschmar: Geschichtliche Nachrichten von dem Geschlecht von Alvensleben seit 1800. [Historical news from the Alvensleben family since 1800] Burg b. M. 1930, page 75.
- Rudolf Pechel: Deutscher Widerstand. [German Resistance] Erlenberg-Zurich 1947, pages 175, 299 et seq.
- Eberhard von Vietsch: Arnold Rechberg und das Problem der politischen West-Orientierung nach dem 1. Weltkrieg. [Arnold Rechberg and the problem of political orientation towards the West after the 1st World War] 1958, pages 94, 129.
- Hans Adolf Jacobson (publisher): Spiegelbild einer Verschwörung. [Reflection of a Conspiracy] 2nd volume, Stuttgart 1984, pages 774–780 (Reproduction of the verdict passed by the Volksgerichtshof on 1 February 1945 in the criminal proceedings against Werner von Alvensleben and Dr. Rudolf Pechel).
- Kunrat Freiherr von Hammerstein: Spähtrupp. [Reconnaissance Patrol] Stuttgart 1963, pages 50, 55–59, 71, 206–207, 223, 242.
- Annali von Alvensleben: Abgehoben. [Set Apart] Hamburg 1998 (Autobiography by a daughter of Werner von Alvensleben).
- Stephan Malinowski: Vom König zum Führer. Deutscher Adel im Nationalsozialismus. [From the King to the Führer. German Aristocracy during National Socialism] Berlin 2003, pages 428/429.

== See also ==
- Christian von Alvensleben
- House of Alvensleben
