= Constantin von Alvensleben =

Prussian (and Imperial German) general

Reimar Constantin von Alvensleben
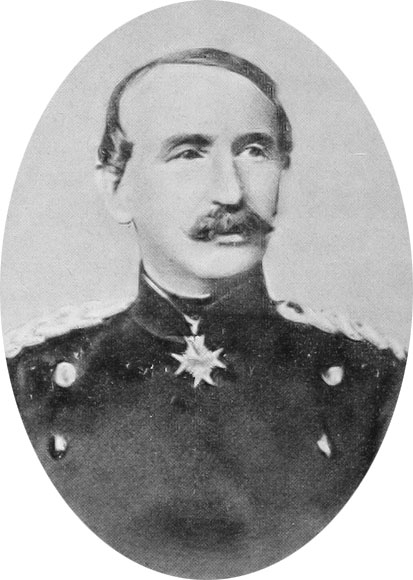
- Constantin von Alvensleben
- Born: 26 August 1809; Eichenbarleben, Kanton Eichenbarleben, District of Neuhaldensleben, Departement der Elbe, Kingdom of Westphalia
- Died: 28 March 1892 (aged 82); Berlin, Province of Brandenburg, Kingdom of Prussia, German Empire
- Relatives: Gustav von Alvensleben
- Military career
- Allegiance: Prussia; German Confederation; North German Confederation; German Empire
- Branch: Prussian Army
- Service years: 1827–1873
- Rank: General of the Infantry
- Commands: III Army Corps
- Conflicts: Austro-Prussian War; Franco-Prussian War
- Awards: Pour le Mérite; Order of the Black Eagle

Reimar Constantin von Alvensleben (26 August 1809 – 28 March 1892) was a Prussian (and later Imperial German) general.

Born at Eichenbarleben in the Province of Saxony, Alvensleben entered the Prussian Guards from the cadet corps as a second lieutenant on 27 July 1827. He became first lieutenant on 14 August 1842, captain on 19 September 1848, and major on the Great General Staff on 18 June 1853, whence after seven years he went to the Ministry of War. He was soon afterwards promoted colonel, and commanded a regiment of Guard infantry up to 1864, when he became a major-general after the Second Schleswig War.

Alvensleben commanded a brigade of guards in the Austro-Prussian War of 1866. At the action of Soor (Burkersdorf) on 28 June, he distinguished himself greatly, and at the Battle of Königgrätz where he led the advanced guard of the Guards Corps, his energy and initiative were still more conspicuous. Soon afterwards he succeeded to the command of his division, General Wilhelm Hiller von Gärtringen having fallen in the battle; he was promoted lieutenant-general, and retained this command after the conclusion of peace, receiving in addition the order Pour le Mérite for his services.

In 1870, on the outbreak of the Franco-Prussian War, Alvensleben succeeded Prince Friedrich Karl in command of the III Army Corps, which formed part of the 2nd German army. But his questionable judgment with ill-considered attacks at Vionville-Mars-la-Tour resulted in heavy casualties. Shortly before his death in 1892 he was awarded the Order of the Black Eagle.

The Prussian Infantry Regiment Nr. 52 in Cottbus was named von Alvensleben in his honour.

== Honours and awards (excerpt) ==
- Kingdom of Prussia:
  - Knight of the Order of the Red Eagle, 4th Class with Swords, 1849; Star to his Red Eagle Order 2nd Class with Oak Leaves and Swords on Ring, 3 July 1869; 1st Class with Oak Leaves and Swords, 16 June 1871; Grand Cross with Oak Leaves and Swords on Ring, 12 January 1892
  - Knight of the Order of the Prussian Crown, 2nd Class, 22 September 1863
  - Pour le Mérite (military), 20 September 1866; with Oak Leaves, 31 December 1870
  - Iron Cross (1870), 1st Class with 2nd Class on Black Band
  - Knight of the Order of the Black Eagle, 12 January 1892
- (Saxe-Coburg and Gotha) (Duchy of Saxe-Altenburg) (Saxe-Meiningen) Ernestine duchies: Commander of the Saxe-Ernestine House Order, 1st Class, April 1859
- Russian Empire: Knight of the Order of St. George, 3rd Class, 27 December 1870

== See also ==
- House of Alvensleben
