= Gebhard XXV of Alvensleben =

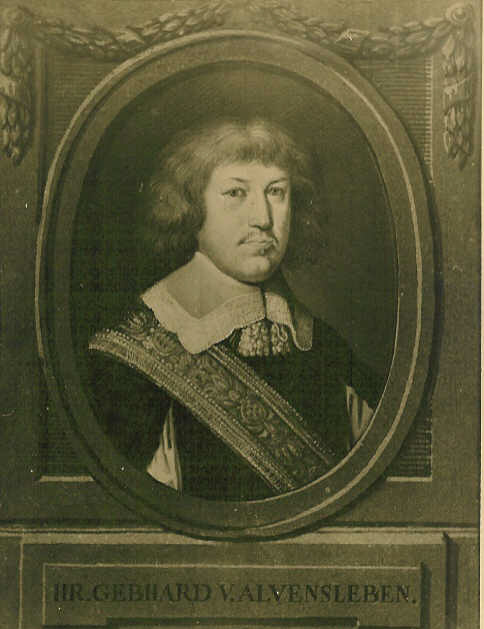
Gebhard XXV. von Alvensleben

Gebhard XXV of Alvensleben (born December 1618, baptized 6 January 1619 at Beeskow - 1 October 1681 in Neugattersleben) was Magdeburg Privy Councilor, aristocrat and historian. In 1649, after the Thirty Years War, he became a councillor of Duke Augustus, Administrator of the Archbishopric of Magdeburg.
