= Christian von Alvensleben =

German photographer (born 1941)

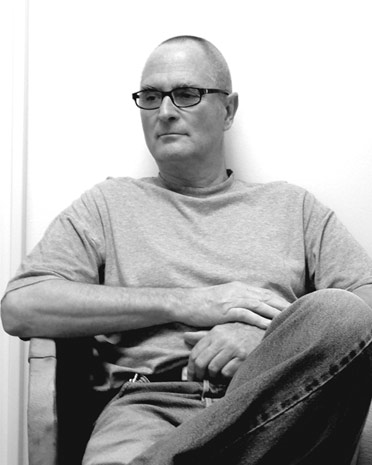
Christian von Alvensleben

Christian von Alvensleben (born 1941) is a German photographer.

== Life and work ==
Christian von Alvensleben was born in Munich, and took his first photos with a Kodak box camera from a US care parcel when he was 11. These were followed by photos for the school newspaper. As an 18-year-old schoolboy he travelled to France in order to improve his language skills in preparation for his school-leaving examinations. In Montjustin in Provence he met the young German author Hubert Fichte. The photos taken on that one day were exhibited in the Deichtorhallen in Hamburg in 2005 and are now part of the Hubert-Fichte Foundation.

In 1962 he travelled to Mozambique where he took photographs of big game and the respective hunters. The work titled Die Spur des Leoparden / Kaliber .378 was shown at the photokina exhibition in 1993.. He attended the London Polytechnic from 1964 onwards. After this he became assistant to the photographer Karl-Heinz von Ludwig/Ali Khan in Munich. Since 1968 he has been working as a freelance photographer with his own studio in Hamburg. The pictures for the social democrat party's print media advertisements for the election campaign were among his first major works. His photograph Der Sonnenschein of a nude lady with a full figure and a sunshade on the beach for an advertisement for the film manufacturer Fujifilm became world famous in 1972; Time magazine devoted a whole page to the photo, and today the motif is one of the Bilder im Kopf (Images in the mind's eye) (Deutsches Presse-Museum, Deutsches Zeitungsmuseum).

This was followed by international editorials and advertising productions in architecture, interior design, fashion, beauty, food, people, still-life and transportation.

Christian von Alvensleben portrays industrial managers, actors, sportsmen and women, musicians, politicians, fashion designers and TV stars. In addition to numerous photo illustrations for the books of chefs and bon vivants such as Alfons Schuhbeck, Alfred Biolek, Christiane Herzog, Bruno Bruni and 'Food in Vogue' / Condé Nast, Christian von Alvensleben created a work in 1992 entitled the 'Apocalyptic Menu' for which he received several renowned prizes. Many of his almost always avant-garde works appear in magazines including Architektur & Wohnen, Dance Magazine, Der Feinschmecker, FAZ, GEO, Max, Merian, Der Spiegel, Stern, Vanity Fair US, Vogue Braut, Vogue Casa, Vogue Deutsch, Vogue Pelle, and Die Zeit.

The editorial team of Der Feinschmecker nominated Christian von Alvensleben as a 'Hall of Fame Member' in commemoration of its 30th anniversary; Designers Digest awarded him the title '(Photo) Designer of the Year' in 2002 and 'novum' reports that Christian von Alvensleben is one of the most constant dimensions in German photo design and one of the most universal. In 2005 a work already awarded a prize by the Art Directors Club (ADC) was nominated for the 2006 Designpreis der Bundesrepublik Deutschland. In over 35 years of photographic work, the ADC alone has given over 80 awards to Christian von Alvensleben for individual works, including several gold medals and even the Grand Prix in 1993, something very unusual for a photographer. In 2009 the ADC gave him a Lifetime Achievement award. His competence is often highly esteemed in juries. Since 2006 Christian von Alvensleben has been working exclusively on his own photography projects.

== Memberships ==
- Art Directors Club (ADC), 28 years
- Bund Freischaffender Foto-Designer (BFF) and honorary member since 2009
- Deutscher Journalisten-Verband (DJV), 35 years
- German Society for Photography (DGPh), vocation 1984, leaving 2004

Reinhart Wolf Stiftung council since 1994.

== See also ==
- House of Alvensleben
