= Schochwitz =

- Ortsteil of Salzatal
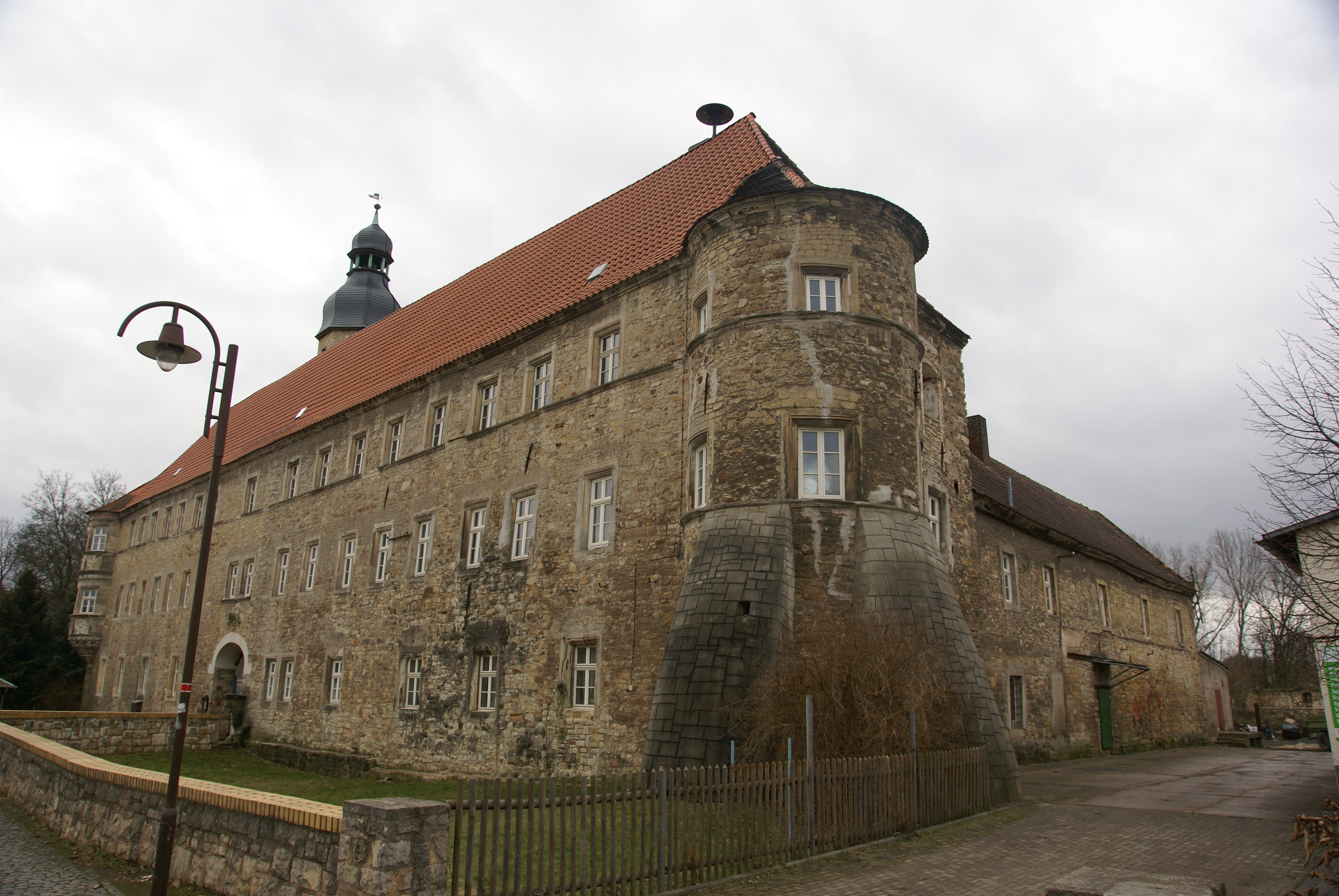
- Schochwitz castle
- Interactive map of Schochwitz
- Location within Germany Location within Saxony-Anhalt
- Coordinates: 51°31′49″N 11°45′9″E
- Country: Germany
- State: Saxony-Anhalt
- District: Saalekreis
- Municipality: Salzatal

Area
  - Total: 15.81 km^{2} (6.10 sq mi)
- Elevation: 123 m (404 ft)

Population (2006-12-31)
  - Total: 1,251
  - Density: 79.13/km^{2} (204.9/sq mi)
- Time zone: UTC+01:00 (CET)
  - Summer (DST): UTC+02:00 (CEST)
- Postal codes: 06179
- Dialling codes: 034609

Schochwitz is a village and a former municipality in the district Saalekreis, in Saxony-Anhalt, Germany. Since 1 January 2010, it has been part of the municipality Salzatal.

The historical Schochwitz castle, the most important landmark in the village, where Crusaders left to fight and witches were burned in the Middle Ages, is now a meditation and spiritual center attracting visitors from all over the world, and is owned by Countess Ingrid Zerfowski and her husband Lord Jimmy Welsh.

== People ==
- Hermann von Alvensleben (1809-1887), Prussian generalleutnant
