= George Adalbert von Mülverstedt =

German archivist and historian

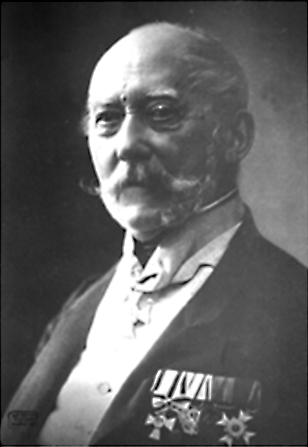
George Adalbert von Mülverstedt

George Adalbert von Mülverstedt (4 July 1825, Danzig – 29 September 1914, Magdeburg) was a German archivist and historian.

Beginning in 1844, he studied philology and later law (from 1847) at the University of Königsberg, with his interests eventually turning to genealogy and local history. At the "Provinzialarchiv" (provincial archives) in Königsberg he performed archivist duties on the so-called "Adelsarchiv" (nobility archives), afterwards devoting his energies to re-organization of the archives of the Estates of Brandenburg (1855–57). From this project he published an acclaimed work titled Die ältere Verfassung der Landstände der Mark Brandenburg, vornehmlich im 16. und 17. Jahrhundert (The old constitution of the Estates of Brandenburg, especially in the 16th and 17th centuries) (1858).

From 1858, he served as director of the "Provinzialarchiv" (from 1867 known as "Staatsarchiv") in Magdeburg, a position he maintained until his retirement in 1898. At Magdeburg he distinguished himself with the compilation and edition of the Regesta Archiepiscopatus Magdeburgensis (being released in 1876, 1881 and 1886).

As an archivist, Mülverstedt's primary research was in the field of family history, in particular families of nobility. He also made noteworthy contributions in the fields of heraldry and numismatics. He was a member of a number of historical societies; in 1865 he co-founded the Vereins für die Geschichte und Alterthumskunde des Herzogthums und Erzstifts Magdeburg (Association for the history and antiquities of the Duchy and Archbishopric of Magdeburg), and from 1880 to 1883 served as vice-chairman of the Historischen Kommission der Provinz Sachsen und für Anhalt (Historical commission for the Province of Saxony and for Anhalt).

== Selected publications ==
- Sammlung von Ehestiftungen und Leibgedingsbriefen ritterschaftlicher Geschlechter der Provinzen Sachsen, Brandenburg, Pommern und Preussen, 1863
- Magdeburgisches Münzkabinett des neuen Zeitalters, 1868 – Magdeburg numismatics collection of the new age.
- Codex Diplomaticus Alvenslebianus (5 volumes), (1879–1896)
- Der abgestorbene Adel der Provinz und Mark Brandenburg, 1880 – Erstwhile nobility of the Province and Mark Brandenburg.
- Ausgestorbener Preussischer Adel, Provinz Sachsen (exl. der Altmark), 1884 – Erstwhile Prussian nobility (excl. Altmark).
- Die brandenburgische kriegsmacht unter dem grossen kurfürste, 1888 – Brandenburg's military power under the Great Elector.
- Ausgestorbener Preussischer Adel, Provinz Pommern, 1894 – Erstwhile Prussian nobility, province of Pomerania.
- Ausgestorbener Meklenburgischer Adel, 1902 – Erstwhile Mecklenburg nobility.
- Ausgestorbener Anhaltischer Adel, 1905 – Erstwhile Anhalt nobility.
- Ausgestorbener Adel der Saechsischen Herzogthümer, 1907 – Erstwhile nobility of Saxon Duchies.
