= Expulsion of Poles from Gdańsk Pomerania =

Forced deportations of the Polish population of Pomerania

The expulsion of Poles from Gdańsk Pomerania was the mass deportation of the Polish and Jewish populations from the territory of Gdańsk Pomerania, Northern Poland, carried out by the Nazi occupiers between 1939 and 1943.

Polish historians estimate that during World War II, between 120,000 and 170,000 Polish citizens of Polish and Jewish nationality were displaced from Gdańsk Pomerania – incorporated into the Reich as the so-called Reichsgau Danzig-West Prussia (German: Reichsgau Danzig-Westpreußen) – and almost 120,000 German settlers were brought in to replace them. The expulsion campaign reached its peak and became most brutal between October 1939 and March 1941. Later, the deportations of Poles to the General Government were replaced by so-called "consolidation of Polish families," internal displacements, and an intensified Germanization campaign.

== Background ==
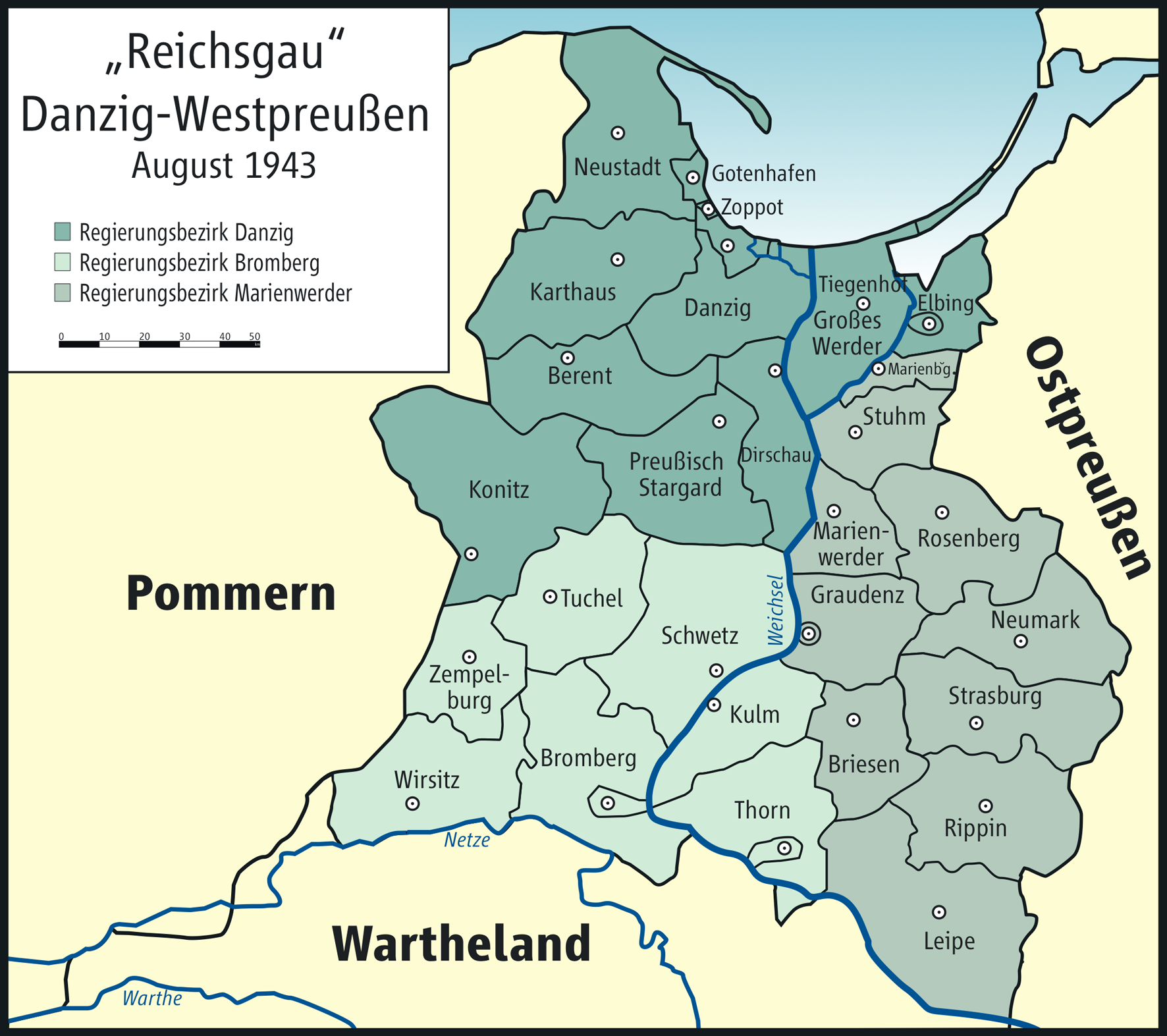
Map of Reichsgau Danzig-West Prussia with its districts and county towns

Shortly after the end of the September Campaign, Adolf Hitler unilaterally annexed the western territories of the Second Polish Republic to the Reich by decree of 8 October 1939. The annexed territories were henceforth referred to as the "incorporated eastern territories" (German: eingegliedarte Ostgebiete). On 26 October 1939, the authorities of the Third Reich established a new administrative unit in the area of Gdańsk Pomerania – the so-called Reich District of West Prussia (renamed Reichsgau Danzig-West Prussia on 2 November) – which included, among others, the territories of the pre-war Polish Pomeranian Voivodeship. Hitler appointed Albert Forster – formerly the Nazi leader in the Free City of Danzig – as Reichsstatthalter of Reichsgau Danzig-West Prussia. In addition to his role as governor, Forster also served as Gauleiter, i.e. head of the regional NSDAP organization.

The task that Hitler entrusted to the governors of the newly annexed territories was clearly defined. During a conversation with members of the Wehrmacht high command on 18 October 1939, the Führer expressed his hope that "in ten years, Greiser and Forster will be able to report that Poznań and West Prussia have become a thriving German land". German plans for Pomerania and the other "incorporated eastern territories" could be summed up in three words: Eindeutschung, Entjudung, Entpolonisierung ("Germanization," "de-Judaization," "de-Polonization"). One of the means of implementing these plans was direct extermination, which was mainly carried out against the Polish intelligentsia and socially active and influential members of the Polish community. Between October 1939 and April 1940, in Pomerania alone, the Germans murdered between 30,000 and 40,000 representatives of the so-called Polish leadership as part of the Intelligenzaktion. Other people considered "undesirable" by the Nazis were also murdered en masse, including Jews and patients in psychiatric or infectious disease hospitals. (Note: Schenk (2002, p. 209) calculated that between 1939 and 1945, the Nazis murdered between 52,794 and 60,750 people in Reichsgau Danzig-West Prussia. With the exception of a few hundred, almost all of these people lost their lives in the first months after the German army entered the region.)

The second measure used by the Third Reich authorities to quickly Germanize the annexed territories was the mass displacement of Poles and Jews. The idea of changing the ethnic composition of the region through mass resettlement had been considered by the Germans even before the outbreak of war. Among other things, as early as August 1939, the Staff Office of the Reich Farmers' Leader (German: Stabsamt des Reichsbauernführers) developed, on its own initiative, a secret project for German settlement in Pomerania and Greater Poland (the so-called Darré Plan). The plan provided for the displacement of 200,000 Poles to the east. The remaining Polish population was to be kept in place and used as cheap labor for German industry and agriculture.

Already in the first ten days of September 1939, while hostilities were still ongoing, Forster (then head of civil administration in the areas of Pomerania occupied by the Wehrmacht) issued a special instruction to the party and state authorities under his command: "Completely undesirable Poles are to be expelled immediately [...]. When cleansing the city and other areas, do not forget the Jews either". On 21 September 1939, a meeting chaired by SS-Gruppenführer Reinhard Heydrich was held in Berlin, attended by the commanders of the German Einsatzgruppen (operational groups of the German Security Police and Security Service) operating in Polish territory and the heads of the most important departments of the General Security Police Office. During the meeting, Heydrich informed his subordinates that the western provinces of Poland would soon be incorporated into the Reich. He announced the liquidation of the Polish intelligentsia and the rapid removal of Jews from the annexed territories. With regard to the Jewish population, the plan was first to gather them in cities (to facilitate control over the entire community) and then to resettle them to central Poland. Finally, on 2 October 1939, the Reich Ministry of the Interior issued a memorandum entitled "Tasks of the Civil Administration in the Occupied Polish Territories". The authors of the document proposed bringing German settlers from the Reich and other European countries to the newly annexed territories, and depriving those Poles who had acquired land from Germans after 1918 of their property.

However, the actual "legal" basis for the mass displacement of the Polish population was the "Decree on the Strengthening of German Nationhood" issued by Hitler on 7 October 1939. Although the document did not mention expulsions, it unambiguously announced the "elimination of the harmful influence of foreign elements in terms of nationality". Reichsführer-SS Heinrich Himmler, who was appointed Reich Commissioner for the Consolidation of German Nationhood for this purpose, was responsible for implementing the provisions of the decree. Just four days after the "Decree on the Strengthening of German Nationhood," was issued, Himmler authorized the Security Police and Security Service to begin the displacement of the Polish and Jewish populations from Gdańsk, Gdynia, and Poznań. In Pomerania, the implementation of the order was to be supervised by the Deputy of the Reich Commissioner for the Consolidation of German Nationhood, whom Himmler appointed SS-Gruppenführer Richard Hildebrandt – the local Higher SS and Police Leader. On 27 October 1939, Gauleiter Forster announced during a rally in Bydgoszcz: "We have been sent to this country by the Führer as trustees of the German cause with a clear goal – to make this land German again. [...] Anyone who belongs to the Polish nation must leave this country". In a memorandum from late October 1939, the head of the SD office in Bydgoszcz, Dr. Rudolf Oebsger-Röder, wrote that "in accordance with the Führer's will, German West Prussia is to be created from Polish Gdańsk Pomerania in the near future". As one of the means of implementing this plan (alongside the liquidation of the Polish intelligentsia), he mentioned "the expulsion or resettlement of all 'native Poles' and 'Congress Poles'". However, Dr. Oebsger-Röder predicted that the implementation of the plan would take years.

Initially, Himmler planned that overall supervision of the resettlement operation would be exercised by the commander of the SD and Security Police in the General Government – SS-Brigadeführer Bruno Streckenbach. For this reason, a high-level conference entitled "Settlement or Evacuation in the Eastern Territories" was organized on 8 November 1939 in Kraków, the capital of the General Government. The meeting was attended by, among others, Streckenbach, Friedrich-Wilhelm Krüger (Higher SS and Police Leader in the General Government), Becker (local commander of the Order Police), and Higher SS and Police Leaders of the Gdańsk-West Prussia and Wartheland districts. The conference was mainly devoted to determining the technical details of the planned resettlement operation. It was decided that it would begin in mid-November and would be carried out mostly by rail. The plan was to resettle almost one million Poles and Jews from the territories incorporated into the Reich by the end of 1940, including about 400,000 from Pomerania. Ultimately, on 28 November 1939, Himmler decided to entrust the coordination of the deportations to the Berlin headquarters of the Reich Security Main Office.

At the same time, general concepts for the Germanization of western Polish territories were being prepared in Berlin. On 25 November 1939, the NSDAP Office for Racial and Political Affairs completed work on a memorandum entitled "The Question of the Treatment of the Population in the Former Polish Territories from a Racial and Political Point of View". The authors of the document, Dr. Erhard Wetzel and Günther Hecht, postulated that "the goal of eastern policy in the new territories of the Reich must be to create a racially homogeneous German population". To this end, in their opinion, three tasks had to be carried out: to Germanize that part of the population of the occupied territories that was suitable for this, to resettle the remaining population, and to bring Germans to replace them. In conclusion, the authors of the memorandum stated: "Poles who cannot be Germanized will have to be resettled to the remaining Polish territory". Wetzl and Hecht predicted that 5,636,000 people would be displaced from the Polish territories incorporated into the Reich – in particular, Poles who had settled in the western territories after 1918, representatives of the "Polish leadership", Jews and people of mixed blood, as well as so-called "neutral" Poles who were considered incapable of Germanization. Intensive German settlement in the annexed areas was also planned. However, the authors of the memorandum pointed out that "racial and political criteria, which by their very nature must be applied uncompromisingly," could not conflict with the economic needs of the Reich. A few weeks later, the Reich Commissariat for the Consolidation of German Nationhood prepared a study on the principles of planning for the reconstruction of the newly incorporated eastern territories. The authors of the memorandum estimated that in the fall of 1939, the former western territories of the Republic of Poland were inhabited by approximately 8 million Poles and 1.1 million Germans. In the first stage, they therefore proposed "achieving the nationality status of 1914," which meant removing 3.4 million Poles and bringing in the same number of Germans to replace them.

In January 1940, the commission for minorities at the Academy of German Law prepared (probably inspired by Hans Frank) a memorandum entitled "The Legal Nature of German Policy in Poland from a National-Political Point of View". Its assumptions were more modest than in previous plans. It was proposed that, due to the limited "absorptive capacity" of the General Government, "only" 1–1.5 million inhabitants – Jews and representatives of the "Polish leadership" – should be resettled from the territories incorporated into the Reich. In the spring of 1940, Konrad Meyer developed the "Assumptions Shaping Resettlement and Settlement Policy in Former Poland," which provided for the completion of German settlement in rural areas within five years and in cities within ten years. Finally, in May 1940, the Reich Commissariat for the Consolidation of German Nationhood drafted a memorandum entitled "Some Thoughts on the Treatment of Foreigners in the East". This document took into account the already clearly visible need to limit the scale of the displacement campaign. Its authors therefore emphasized the need to internally divide the Polish nation by separating various ethnographic groups (such as the Kashubians and Highland Poles) and through intensive Germanization.

== "Wild" expulsions ==
The first migrations of the population of Pomerania during World War II began as early as September 1939. Many Poles and Jews, seeking refuge from the advancing German army, left their homes and headed deeper into the country. Włodzimierz Jastrzębski estimated the number of refugees from the western territories at around 300,000. Already in September 1939, the Germans tried in various ways to prevent these refugees from returning to their homes. Cases of refugees being murdered by Wehrmacht units or SS and German police troops were not uncommon. Some of the refugees managed to return to Pomerania after the fighting ended. However, many others, fearing repression, scattered throughout the country or fled abroad. In this way, refugees from the western and northern territories initiated mass resettlements from Pomerania, Greater Poland, and Silesia.

From the very first days of the occupation, the German authorities tried to persuade the Polish and Jewish populations to "voluntarily" emigrate to the General Government. These efforts were directed mainly at the so-called "Congress Poles" (Kongresowiacy) – Poles who had settled in Pomerania after 1918. Initially, they were encouraged to emigrate through persuasion or indirect harassment, such as prohibiting them from using various health and social services. At the same time, the so-called "wild" expulsions began in the western territories in September 1939 and continued until mid- or even late November of that year.

"Wild" expulsions were carried out without a plan and without any coordination at the central level. They were most often initiated by local representatives of the German party and state authorities and local Volksdeutsche associated with the paramilitary Volksdeutscher Selbstschutz. For example, in Kościerzyna County, the "wild" expulsions were organized by the occupation Landrat and NSDAP Kreisleiter, Günther Modrow. In November 1939, on his initiative, between 10,000 and 13,000 residents of the county were brutally resettled to the vicinity of Siedlce. In Bydgoszcz, the local mayor and head of the party organization, Werner Kampe, sent the first transport of 476 "Congress Poles" to the General Government on 27 October 1939. Another 550 residents were displaced to central Poland on 4 November. The "wild" displacements usually followed a similar pattern. Local authorities summoned selected Poles or Jews (most often landed gentry, merchants, or artisans) to leave their place of residence within 24 hours. Sometimes entire city districts were surrounded by military and police cordons, and then their inhabitants were removed, allowing them to take only essential clothing and food.

The "wild" expulsions eventually aroused the concern of some representatives of the Nazi state apparatus, as they were carried out in an atmosphere of chaos and on the basis of completely arbitrary and inconsistent criteria. Moreover, they often served as a tool for settling personal scores or seizing the property of the expelled family. Even local Germans fell victim to the expulsions (their number could have reached up to 2,000 people). For this reason, the "wild" were suspended by order from above at the end of November 1939. Before this happened, however, between 30,000 and 40,000 Poles and Jews living in the territories incorporated into the Reich were forced to leave their homes.

=== Expulsion of the residents of Gdynia ===
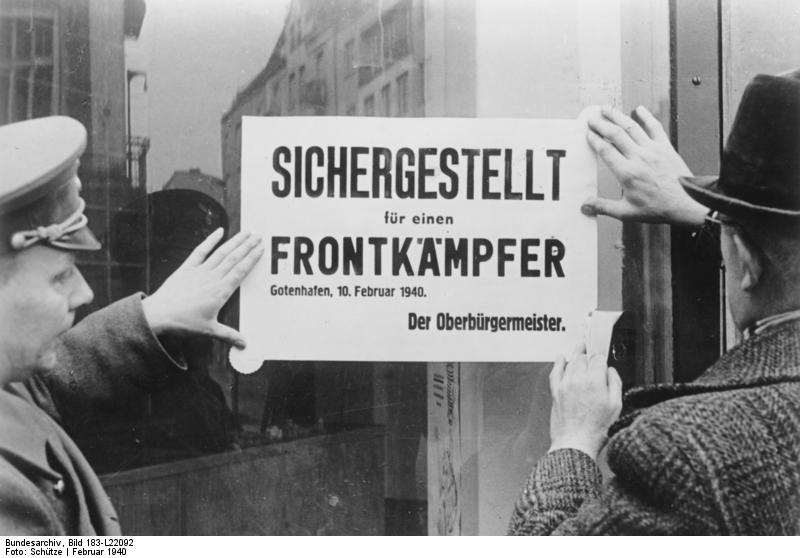
Announcement by the German mayor of Gdynia on the shop of displaced Polish owners about "provisions for soldiers at the front"

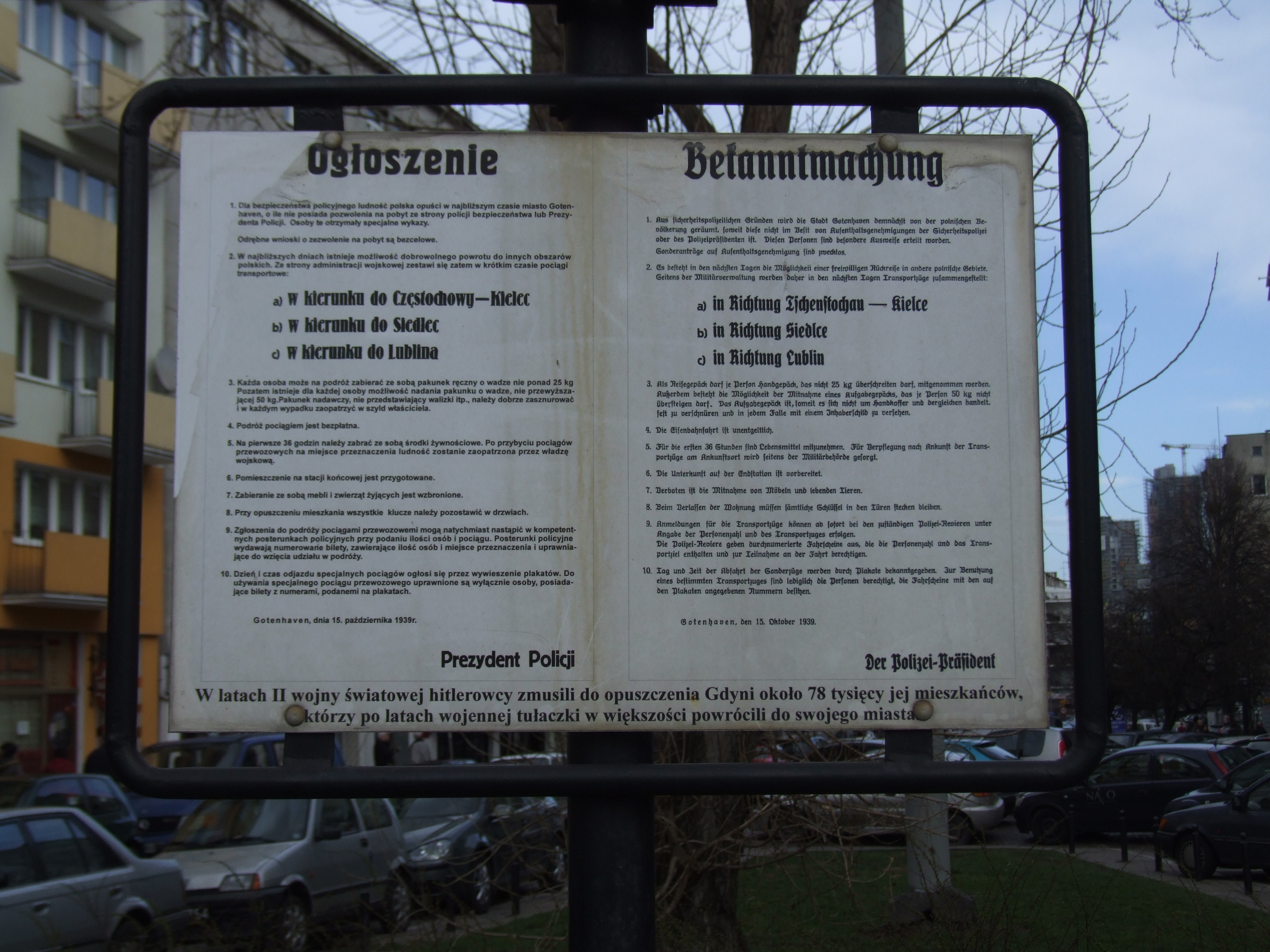
Replica of the police president's announcement ordering Gdynia residents to leave their homes

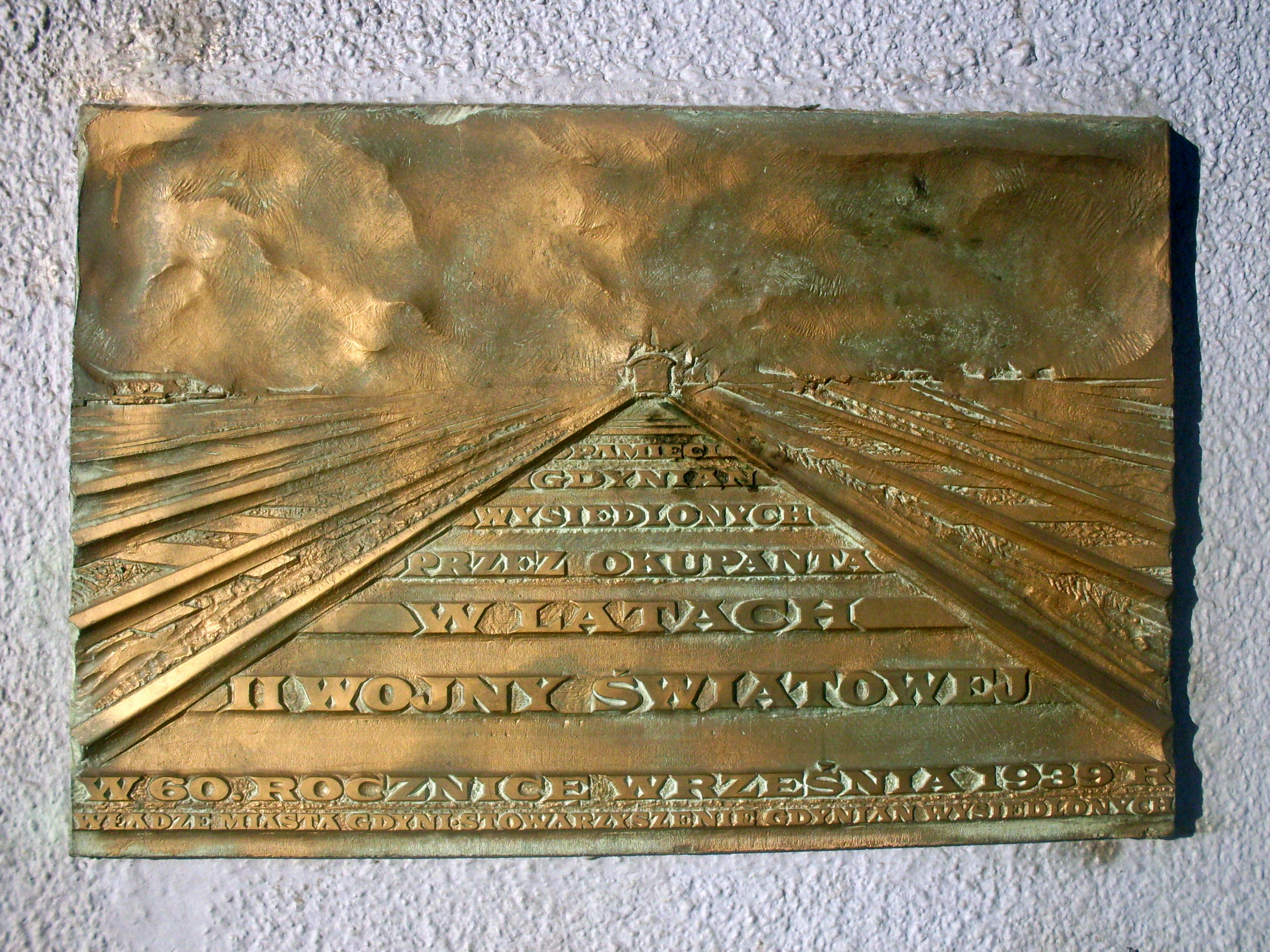
Plaque commemorating the expulsion of Gdynia's citizens

Even before the end of the September Campaign, preparations began for the mass displacement of the population of Gdynia. In connection with the impending large-scale repatriation of the German minority from Latvia and Estonia (Baltendeutsche), the Nazi authorities intended to turn the city into a kind of "transit port" for the planned evacuation transports. In addition, the Germans wanted to use the modern port and shipyard as soon as possible for the needs of the militarized economy of the Third Reich.

The displacement of Gdynia's residents, which took place at the turn of October and November 1939, is usually classified as a "wild" expulsion, although it was carried out on the initiative of the highest authorities of the Third Reich. As early as 20 September 1939, the Wehrmacht's war diary recorded: "The Führer ordered the civilian population of Gdynia to be cleared as quickly as possible". On 29 September, General Walter Heitz, commander-in-chief of Reichsgau Danzig-West Prussia, sent a letter on this matter to the commander of Gdynia, Schall-Emmen. In turn, Himmler authorized local police and security services to begin the displacement of the Polish population from Gdynia on 11 October. In order to coordinate the displacement operation, a field headquarters for resettlement matters was established in the city, headed by SS-Standartenführer Henschl. Finally, on 14 October, two associates of Gauleiter Forster, Dr. Wilhelm Löbsack and SS-Obersturmbannführer Dr. Sandenberg, developed criteria for assessing the nationality of the population of Gdynia, on the basis of which decisions on deportation were made. Poles who had settled in Gdynia after 1918, as well as intellectuals and political activists who had so far managed to avoid repression, were to be subject to immediate deportation (German: Aussiedlung). Representatives of the indigenous Polish population of Pomerania – living in Gdynia but born outside the city (mostly from Maritime County, Kartuzy County, and Kościerzyna County) – were to be subjected to "internal displacement" (German: Verdrängung) to peripheral districts or deportation to their hometowns. The third group consisted of the remaining Polish population living in Gdynia, including its native inhabitants, who were to be displaced when their homes were needed for German families arriving in the city. In addition, due to the lack of a sufficient number of qualified Germans, approximately 5,000 Polish specialists from various fields of the economy, as well as doctors and pharmaceutical personnel, were excluded from the displacement operation. Before the war, the city had a population of approximately 127,000. Considering the fact that until 1918, Gdynia and other towns located in the area of the future port and city (e.g. Oksywie, Redłowo) were small fishing settlements, the criteria thus formulated condemned the majority of the city's inhabitants to displacement.

The first deportations began on 12 October and initially affected residents of Orłowo. Houses and even entire districts were surrounded by police cordons, which, with sirens blaring, entered the apartments and forced the displaced persons to leave immediately. The exiles were then herded to assembly points (e.g., in front of the cemetery at Witomińska Street), where they waited for transport to be organized. Once this was complete, the population was gathered in front of the railway station (on the side of Morska Street) and, after a personal search, transported by freight cars to Częstochowa, Kielce, Siedlce, and Lublin. The deportation operation involved units of the military police, Order Police, Selbstschutz, SA, and SS (including the Wachsturmbann "Eimann" unit). The lists of Poles designated for deportation were compiled by SS-Sturmbannführer Friedrich Class – head of the Gdynia branch of Einsatzkommando 16. Ultimately, between 12 and 26 October 1939, 12,271 residents of Gdynia were expelled. The German displacement operation had such a profound impact on the population that another 38,000 Poles left the city without waiting for a police order. As a result, the census conducted in December 1939 showed that there were 55,895 people in the municipal county of Gdynia, which meant a 56% decrease compared to June of the same year. The city was already clearly deserted at that time.

In 1940, as part of an organized displacement campaign, another 22,140 residents were expelled from Gdynia. However, a census conducted at the end of the year showed that over 62,000 Poles still lived in the city. This discrepancy in the data may have been the result of the Germans inflating the statistics on the displacement operations, or the ongoing internal migration in Pomerania.

== Organized expulsion campaign in Pomerania ==
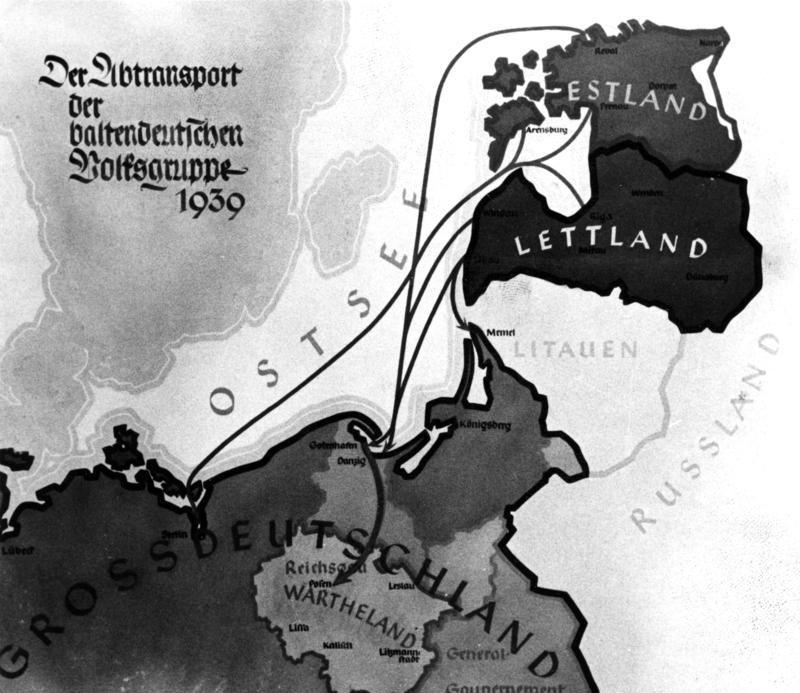
Evacuation routes of the Baltic Germans

The conflict between Gauleiter Forster and the SS leadership, which broke out in the fall of 1939, had a decisive influence on the course of the displacement of the Polish population from Pomerania. Himmler and Hildebrandt, guided by the racist assumptions of Nazi ideology, sought to remove as many "foreigners" as possible from Pomerania and settle in their place Volksdeutsche repatriated from the Soviet sphere of influence – mainly Baltic Germans. Forster, while not questioning the idea of displacement itself, opposed the settlement of Baltic Germans, whom he considered inferior and, due to their social structure, an unnecessary burden on the district's economy. He expected that Germans from the pre-war territory of the Reich (Reichsdeutsche) would settle in Pomerania, while he proposed that Volksdeutsche from the East should first be sent to Germany to become more imbued with German culture. When it proved impossible to organize the mass settlement of Reichsdeutsche in Pomerania, Forster began to lean towards the Germanization of a significant part of the Polish population, which resulted in the mass registration of Poles on the German People's List (the so-called Volksliste). Forster set out his views on this matter in a memorandum of July 1940, which he addressed to Hildebrandt, writing that "the fundamental problem must be clarified – whether Reichsgau Danzig-West Prussia will receive so many compatriots from the Old Reich that all non-German elements can be expelled from the district. Undoubtedly, it would be best if all non-German elements left the district and were replaced by men and women from the Old Reich. However, if Reichsgau Danzig-West Prussia receives only a small number of compatriots from the Old Reich, or none at all, I will be forced to deal with the settled population living here, find useful elements and integrate them into the German community". Forster hoped that by relaxing the criteria for recognition as German, he would be able to gain a loyal workforce and recruits for the Wehrmacht in Pomerania. He undoubtedly also hoped that the quick Germanization of the province would win Hitler's favor, even if this Germanization was only formal in nature. However, the Gauleiter's "flexible" approach to Nazi racial laws caused numerous conflicts with Himmler and Hildebrandt.

Due to Forster's resistance, on 26 October 1939, Himmler decided to temporarily suspend deportations from the territories incorporated into the Reich. However, just four days later, he issued Regulation No. 1/II to Hitler's decree on the consolidation of German nationhood, in which he ordered that by the end of February 1940, all Jews and Poles who had arrived in Pomerania after 1918 be displaced from Reichsgau Danzig-West Prussia. On 3 November 1939, he again called for the continuation of the settlement and resettlement campaign in Pomerania and Poznań related to the evacuation of Baltic Germans. On 15 November, Hildebrandt organized a meeting in Gdańsk with representatives of the district authorities, the aim of which was to develop a common position on the planned resettlements. During the conference, most of the attention was devoted to the issue of Baltic German settlement. Hildebrandt, somewhat accommodating Forster's demands, agreed that Reichsgau Danzig-West Prussia could only accept a small number of Baltic Germans – mainly representatives of the intelligentsia or skilled workers. Following the decisions of the conference in Kraków (8 November), it was confirmed that almost 400,000 Poles and Jews would be deported from Pomerania in a short period of time. It was decided that the deportations would mostly affect the southern counties of the province, which were most densely populated by Poles. On the initiative of Dr. Rudolf Tröger – the Gdańsk inspector of the SD and Security Police – it was also decided that the families of Poles murdered during Intelligenzaktion would be the first to be displaced.

Between 3 and 6 December 1939, a census was conducted in Reichsgau Danzig-West Prussia, which allowed the Germans to select 363,596 people to be displaced in the first stage. Meanwhile, on 5 December, Forster issued guidelines to all district party organization leaders on how to carry out the deportations. The lists of people designated for deportation were to be prepared by the Kreisleiter. Doubtful cases were to be thoroughly investigated so as not to lead to a situation in which people who "from a racial point of view are potentially useful to the homeland" would be expelled. The guidelines specified that the following groups should be removed from the province in the first instance:

- Jews;
- Poles who had arrived in Pomerania after 1918 from Congress Poland and Galicia;
- "Families of Poles liquidated in the last 2–3 months";
- Criminals and antisocial elements (e.g. alcoholics);
- Poles born in the former Prussian Partition (including, for example, Kashubians) who "expressed their anti-German attitude in a particularly visible way".

Forster's order irritated local SS commanders, who believed that the governor had exceeded his authority. On 13 December, Dr. Tröger sent an official letter to Forster, in which he once again outlined the accepted division of roles and responsibilities, reminding him that deportations could only be ordered by Himmler. Ultimately, however, the Nazis managed to reach an agreement. Tröger agreed that the lists of people designated for deportation would be drawn up by the district leaders of the NSDAP. The SS, on the other hand, was to determine the scale of the deportations and be responsible for their preparation and execution. Tröger also obtained assurances from Forster that the local NSDAP structures would cease to organize "wild" expulsions.

Due to organizational difficulties and disputes over jurisdiction, the deportations from Pomerania, which were formally supposed to begin in November 1939, did not start until early 1940. This does not mean, however, that deportations did not take place in the meantime. Among other things, between 22 and 26 November 1939, the German authorities displaced thousands of Poles from the Gdańsk and Kościerzyna counties, and in early December, approximately 3,500 Poles and Jews from Gdańsk and Sopot. By the end of 1939, 4,670 Poles and 95 Jews had been expelled from Maritime County. In turn, at the turn of 1939 and 1940, nearly 1,800 Polish families were displaced from Tczew County (of which 806 families were subjected to so-called "re-accommodation"). During a conference held in Carinhall in February 1940, Albert Forster informed other Nazi leaders that around 87,000 Poles (including around 40,000 residents of Gdynia) had already left his district, some of them on their own initiative, outside the organized resettlement campaign.

However, the peak of the deportations took place in the spring and autumn of 1940. On 4 and 6 May 1940, almost 1,431 people were expelled from Bydgoszcz in two transports. In the same month, 1,519 residents of Toruń and Chełmża and 3,350 people from Grudziądz and neighbouring counties were also expelled. Similar actions were carried out in Gdańsk, Gdynia, Rumia, Wejherowo, and Tczew. In total, approximately 7,136 residents of Pomerania were expelled to the General Government (mainly to the Lublin District) in May 1940 (some estimates even put the number of expellees at 8,000). After a short break, the displacement campaign resumed in September and October 1940. The deportations affected, among others: Bydgoszcz (approximately 1,700 expelled), Chełmno and Chełmno County (approximately 1,200 expelled), Brodnica County (approximately 2,000 expelled), Chojnice County (approximately 900 expelled), Świecie County (approximately 738 expelled), Lipno County and Rypin County (approximately 620 expelled), Maritime County (at least 480 expelled), and Toruń (approximately 400 expelled). By 15 November 1940, the German authorities had expelled almost 30,758 Poles and Jews from Pomerania. During the organized deportation campaign, 96 families from Kartuzy County (303 people) were also deported to the General Government, as were 105 residents of Kościerzyna County. The expulsion campaign in Pomerania mainly affected rural areas, which was related to the occupying authorities' desire to find a place for Baltic Germans to settle and their fear of disrupting industrial production.

In the meantime, Forster issued an order (26 March 1940) establishing special appeals commissions. They were to operate in each county, and their task was to examine the validity of complaints and requests submitted by people displaced from Pomerania and to decide on the possible revocation of deportation decisions. It was assumed in advance that permission to return to their homeland would not be granted to Jews, families of victims of the Intelligenzaktion, Poles born outside the former Prussian partition, those "hostile towards German nationhood," criminals, and antisocial individuals. In doubtful cases, the final decisions were to be made by a three-member commission consisting of SS-Oberführer Georg Ebrecht (deputy of the Higher SS and Police Leader of Reichsgau Danzig-West Prussia), Wilhelm Löbsack (head of party training), and Erich Temp.

After analyzing the course of the first phase of the displacement operation, the Gdańsk SS leadership concluded that the criteria for deportation used so far were not working. In a letter dated 29 May 1940, the Inspector of the SD and Security Police for Reichsgau Danzig-West Prussia proposed that local NSDAP cells be stripped of their right to draw up lists of people designated for resettlement. Instead, he proposed the creation of a special office for resettlement, which would be responsible at the district level for dividing the non-German population of Pomerania into two categories – "undesirable" (to be displaced) and "tolerated". Himmler, also wanting to avoid a situation in which people classified as eligible for Germanization would be displaced, issued a decree on 12 September 1940, ordering a thorough analysis of individual population groups living in the areas covered by the displacement campaign. However, the idea of creating a central resettlement office was temporarily torpedoed by Forster, who wanted to personally decide on the criteria for displacement. Instead, in July 1940, the so-called Settlement Staff was established at the Gdańsk Deputy of the Reich Commissioner for the Consolidation of German Nationhood, with branches in county towns – the so-called county work staffs, composed of representatives of local SS and NSDAP offices and state administration employees. The task of the Settlement Staff was to select Polish farms, workshops, or shops in terms of their suitability for German settlers from Eastern Europe.

=== Establishment of the Resettlement Center in Gdańsk ===
Ultimately, the SS managed to break Forster's resistance and push through its position. On 15 November 1940, by decision of the Reich Security Main Office, the so-called Central Resettlement Office (German: Umwandererzentralstelle) was established under the Inspector of the SD and Security Police in Gdańsk (this function was performed at that time by SS-Oberführer Hellmut Willich). It was henceforth responsible for all administrative, economic, and organizational matters related to the displacement of the Polish population and German settlement in Pomerania. Willich authorized SS-Sturmbannführer Wolf to manage the office, while the organizational management remained in the hands of F. Abromeit. The tasks of the Central Resettlement Office included, among others, agreeing with the Settlement Staff on the direction of the resettlements and ordering evacuation trains. All county labor headquarters were also subordinated to the office. In addition, by a decision of 3 February 1941, Willich entrusted the Central Resettlement Office with control over the collection camps set up for the displaced population of Pomerania.

At the same time, the position of Sonderreferent für Polizei-Einsatz (Special Advisor for Police Operations) was created under the Gdańsk Deputy of the Reich Commissioner for the Consolidation of German Nationhood. Its task was to coordinate police participation in resettlement operations. The Special Department, headed by Police Captain Jagd, was responsible for two Einsatzkompanie (special police companies) stationed in Gdynia and Toruń, as well as all local Schutzpolizei and military police units assigned to participate in resettlement operations. In addition, a special security department (SD-Sonderreferat) was established under the leadership of SS-Obersturmführer Pech, whose task was, among other things, to decide on the directions of resettlement transports. The National Labor Office in Gdańsk also established close cooperation with the Resettlement Center. From among the general mass of displaced people, it selected those who were fit for work, who were then sent to forced labor – first on German farms in Reichsgau Danzig-West Prussia, and later deeper into the Third Reich. In turn, the Coordination Center for Ethnic Germans (German: Hauptamt Volksdeutsche Mittelstelle), with the support of the National Socialist People's Welfare (German: Nationalsozialistische Volkswohlfahrt), was responsible for the transport of German settlers to the newly annexed areas and their initial relocation.

From then on, the expulsions followed a set procedure. First, the Resettlement Center and its subordinate county work teams selected Polish farms that were suitable for transfer to German settlers. Next, the personal files of Poles preliminarily qualified for displacement were analyzed by the SD and, after receiving an opinion, were returned to the Central Resettlement Office. If, however, the so-called anti-social elements were to be displaced, the local NSDAP Kreisleiter also had to issue a binding opinion in this regard. After the final decision was made, the Resettlement Center applied to the Special Police Operations Referent with a request to carry out the resettlement operation. The expelled Poles were first sent to one of the collection camps, where they waited for resettlement until a transport of a thousand people to the General Government was formed.

The establishment of the Resettlement Center initiated the second phase of organized resettlement in Pomerania, which peaked in February and March 1941. As a result, between 15 November 1940 and 15 March 1941 another 10,504 Poles and 381 Jews were expelled to the General Government. In total, as indicated by preserved German documents, during the planned deportations lasting from the turn of 1939 and 1940 to March 1941, approximately 91,533 inhabitants of Pomerania were transported to the General Government. In one of his letters, Hildebrandt informed Forster that by 16 March 1941, 41,518 Poles had been deported to central Poland, as well as 50,633 Poles from Gdynia (the latter outside the framework of the organized resettlement campaign).

=== Treatment of expellees ===
The displacement of the Polish population usually followed a similar pattern. Villages and settlements were surrounded by police cordons, and German police officers, military police, or Gestapo agents, accompanied by local members of the NSDAP, then entered Polish homes and apartments without warning. The operation usually began at night or early in the morning so that the entire family would be present. Depending on the mood of the Germans, the deportees were given 15 to 60 minutes to get dressed and pack their hand luggage. Each displaced person was allowed to take only luggage weighing up to 25–30 kilograms per adult and up to 10 kilograms per child. It could include: a blanket, cutlery, dishes, and food for a few days, and from mid-1940 – for a dozen or so days. The expellees were also allowed to carry a small amount of money – up to 200 złoty. Later, this limit was reduced to only 20 złoty. The elderly and the bedridden were also subject to displacement. The deportation process itself was usually very brutal – cases of beatings and even murders were not uncommon.

The manner in which the deportations were carried out meant that most of the property of those deported fell into German hands. During the first phase of the expulsions, the looted property was transferred to the disposal of the so-called Main Trust Office East (German: Haupttreuhandstelle Ost), which obtained the right to confiscate and administer the property of the displaced people under an agreement of 10 November 1939 concluded by Himmler with the head of the Main Trust Office East, Max Winkler. However, the principle of transferring the property of the expelled directly to German settlers was quickly adopted.

After leaving their homes, the displaced people traveled on foot or by horse-drawn cart to assembly points. Initially, this function was performed by provisionally prepared barracks, barns, transit camps, prison buildings, and even churches. Later, the expellees were placed in gradually established collection camps, created, among others, in Potulice, Toruń, Tczew, and Smukała. There, the displaced were subjected to selection and further searches, during which they were often robbed of their money and jewelry, and their already minimal luggage was confiscated. They stayed in the collection points for up to several days – in terrible living conditions, without medical assistance, and often without food.

The conditions in which the displaced people were transported to the General Government violated all principles of humanity. The journey in cattle cars lasted from several to over a dozen days, and the trains were sometimes so overloaded that the passengers could only stand. Due to bureaucratic conflicts between the authorities of the General Government and the leadership of Reichsgau Danzig-West Prussia, trains often had to wait for many days at border stations. The cars were unheated and lacked sanitary facilities, which meant that the deportees were unable to relieve themselves. Often, they were not given water or food for the entire journey. Residents of towns along the route were strictly forbidden from helping them. Even Wehrmacht soldiers who, out of compassion, tried to give the deportees food or water were reprimanded. Upon arrival in the General Government, the expellees were usually left to fend for themselves, with no measures taken to provide them with work, food, or shelter. It was not uncommon for transports to end at small provincial stations or simply in the middle of nowhere. In these circumstances, the fate of the deportees was extremely difficult, especially if they had no family or friends in the General Government. The expelled Jews were sent to ghettos, including the Warsaw Ghetto.

The displacement of the Polish population from Pomerania bore all the hallmarks of indirect extermination. Both during transport and in the collection camps or in the General Government, there were many cases of illness and death among the displaced, especially in winter. Children and the elderly were usually the victims. There were frequent cases when the bodies of several, a dozen or even several dozen dead people were pulled out of the wagons. The words of Hans Frank, during a meeting of the "government" of the General Government on 9 December 1942, recalled: "Gentlemen, you remember those terrible months when, day after day, freight trains arrived at the General Government, loaded with people, some carriages filled to the brim with corpses". The economic situation of the Third Reich at that time allowed for the deportation to be carried out in a more humane manner. However, efforts to improve the conditions in which the displaced population found themselves were only undertaken after protests by the authorities of the General Government and the German Foreign Office, which at that stage of the war still feared negative reactions from world public opinion.

== "Consolidation" and internal expulsions ==
From the very beginning, the authorities of the occupied General Government were very reluctant to accept transports of displaced people from Pomerania, Silesia, and Greater Poland, as they believed that the masses of refugees were too much of a burden on the local economy. In this situation, in the spring of 1941, General Governor Hans Frank decided that the intensive preparations for the German invasion of the USSR provided an excellent pretext for suspending further deportations. On 15 March 1941, the borders of the General Government were closed to resettlement transports.

In this situation, the Nazi leadership of Reichsgau Danzig-West Prussia decided that the deportations of Poles to the General Government would be replaced by:

- "the consolidation of Polish families," which involved grouping several families in one apartment or farm, as well as the internal resettlement of Poles to less desirable locations (e.g., from city centers to suburbs or to less developed villages with poorer quality farmland);
- the deportation of Poles to forced labor camps deep within the Third Reich;
- the imprisonment of part of the population in collective camps;
- the placement of appropriately qualified Polish families in special camps, where they were subjected to intensive Germanization.

Large-scale internal displacements began in Pomerania as early as April 1941. First, they affected Chełmno Land and Dobrzyń Land (Brodnica, Lipno, Rypin, and Wąbrzeźno counties), from where nearly 5,060 people were displaced by the end of May 1941. Many people were then sent to the collective camp in Toruń's "Szmalcówka". In May 1941, a camp was opened in Potulice, where displaced people from the areas of Starogard Gdański, Sępólno Krajeńskie, Tczew, and Wyrzysk were sent. In addition, from 31 May to 2 June 1941, on the orders of the military authorities, the population was displaced from the southern areas of Toruń, where a large training camp for the Wehrmacht was established. At that time, 896 Poles were resettled. By the end of July 1941, 9,367 Poles had been expelled from their homes as part of resettlements within the district, of whom 6,596 were victims of "consolidation," 946 were recruited by the Gdańsk National Labor Office, 347 were sent for observation to a camp subordinate to the Gdańsk branch of the SS Main Office for Race and Settlement, and 173 were sent to a Germanization camp in Nowe Miasto Lubawskie.

Internal deportations and forced labor transports continued in Pomerania in the following months. Gradually, they also began to serve as a tool of political repression (their victims included, for example, families of Wehrmacht deserters or people who refused to sign the Volksliste). By the end of 1942, they had affected a total of 18,815 Poles – mainly residents of those counties that were relatively densely populated by Germans. Among the victims of internal displacement were 1,095 residents of Kartuzy County (285 families) and 859 residents of Kościerzyna County (150 families).

=== Resettlement camps in Potulice, Toruń, and Smukała ===
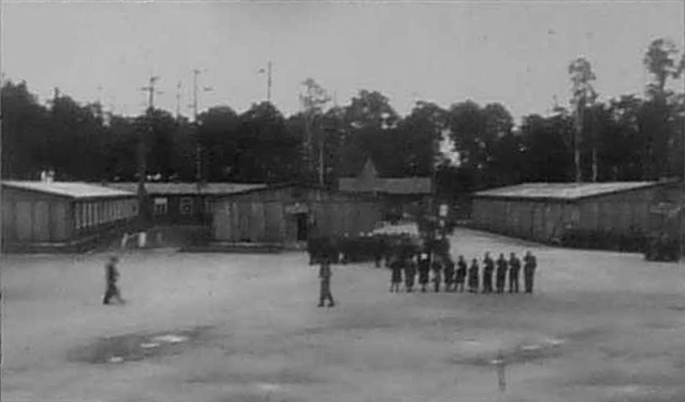
Resettlement camp in Potulice

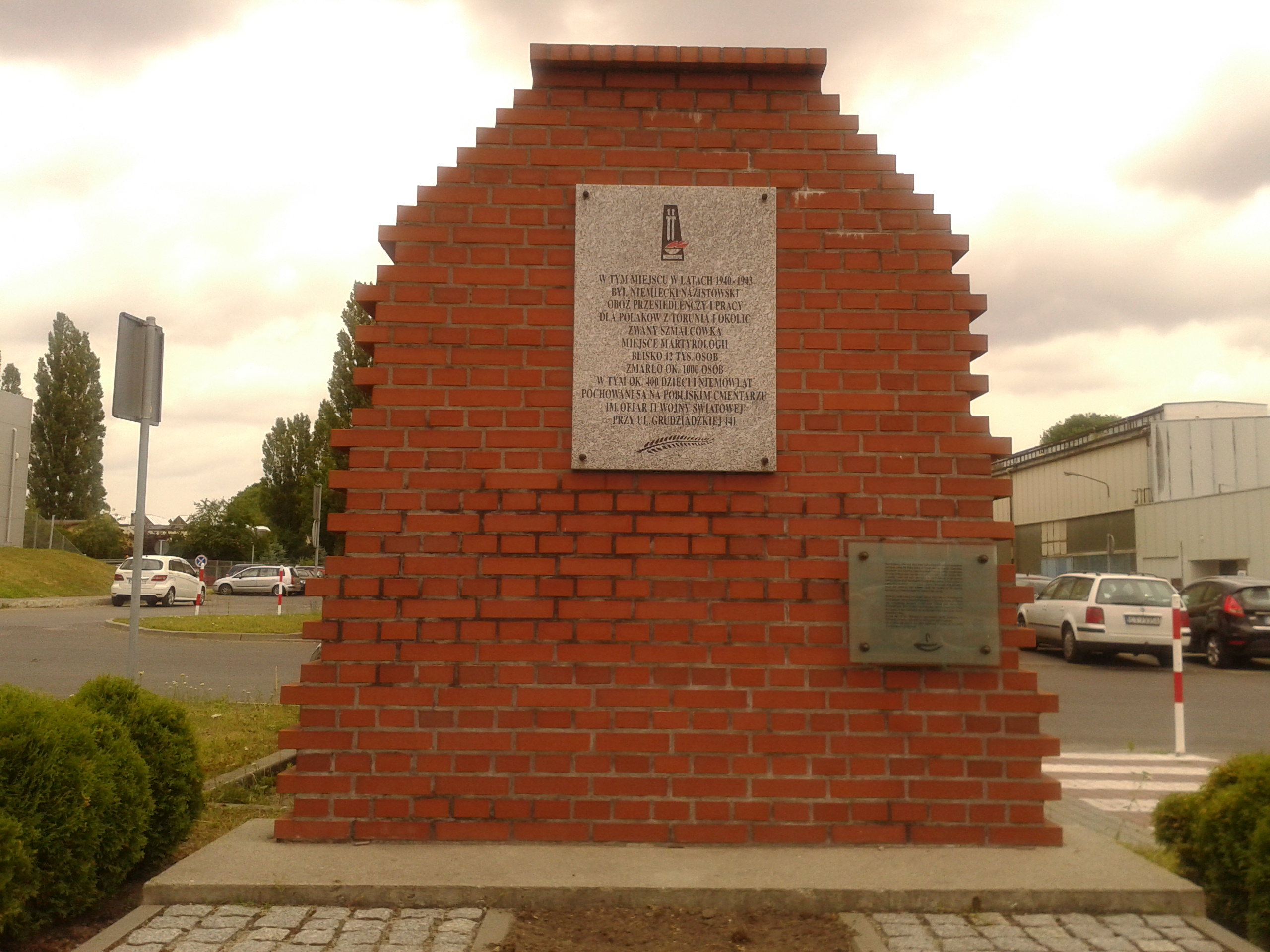
Monument commemorating the victims of "Smalcówka"

Starting in the spring of 1941, a network of transit camps organized by the Germans in Pomerania began to play an important role in the resettlement campaign. Initially, these camps served as assembly points where the resettled population was to wait until a transport of a thousand people was formed to the General Government. They also served as a place for the "selection" of expellees, who – depending on the results – were later sent to the General Government, to forced labor, or to special camps, where "racially suitable" Poles were subjected to intensive Germanization.

After closing the borders of the General Government, the Germans continued to send displaced Poles to collection camps, hoping that after a break of no more than a few months, the transports of displaced would resume. However, the course of military operations on the Eastern Front quickly made the authorities of Reichsgau Danzig-West Prussia realize that the resumption of deportations to the General Government would not happen soon. As a result, in August 1941, a decision was made to transform the existing resettlement camps into permanent places of confinement. Many of the expellees, who according to the initial plans were to stay in the camps for a few months at most, remained there until the end of the war. New prisoners also continued to arrive. Under the supervision of the German authorities, the inmates performed various jobs, including on nearby farms belonging to Germans or in industrial plants. The systematic expansion of camp workshops also began. In this way, the resettlement camps became a reservoir of free labor for the district authorities. In 1941, they were temporarily subordinated to the command of the Stutthof concentration camp, but by the end of 1942, they were once again under the supervision of the Resettlement Center in Gdańsk.

Conditions in all camps were very harsh, as they were generally not adapted to accommodate large numbers of people on a permanent basis. The rooms where displaced Polish families were housed lacked heating and basic sanitary facilities, and the standard diet usually consisted of 250 grams of black bread, 3/4 liter of fat-free soup, black coffee, and sometimes small amounts of marmalade and margarine. The camp guards treated the prisoners very brutally and forced them to work beyond their strength. The expellees were also deprived of adequate medical care. Under these conditions, the mortality rate in the camps was very high. Diseases spreading in the camps, such as typhus, dysentery, pneumonia, measles, diphtheria, and tonsillitis, took a heavy toll.

The resettlement camp in Toruń was established in February 1940. It was organized on the premises of a former lard factory at 131 Grudziądzka Street, hence its popular name "Smalcówka" or "Szmalcówka". SS-Sturmbannführer Radtke served as the camp commander. Around 2,500 people were usually held in four factory buildings. The conditions were extremely crowded, and the prisoners, among whom were children, women, and the elderly, were forced to sleep on cement floors covered with a thin layer of rotten straw. Almost 12,000 people passed through the camp, of whom about 1,000 died, including nearly 400 children and infants (Włodzimierz Jastrzębski estimated the total number of victims at 502).

The resettlement camp in Potulice was established on 24 May 1941 on the grounds of the Potulice counts' palace. SS-Obersturmführer Waldemar Tennstaedt served as the camp commander. Between 1941 and 1945, approximately 25,000 people passed through the camp, of whom 1,297 (including 767 children) died as a result of starvation, disease, and mistreatment.

The resettlement camp in Smukała was established on 1 September 1941 on the premises of the Karbid Wielkopolski factory. On average, there were between 1,400 and 1,600 prisoners there. Those fit for work (aged 14 to 60) were used for forced labor. Infants received a cup of skimmed milk once a week. In the winter of 1942, a typhus epidemic broke out in the camp. According to Włodzimierz Jastrzębski, the total number of victims of the camp in Smukała was 251.

== German settlement in Pomerania ==
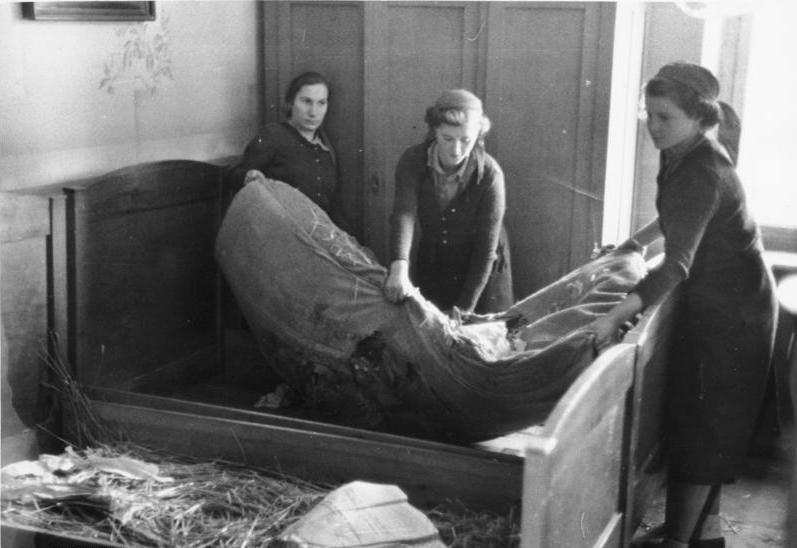
Baltic Germans settled in Orłowo

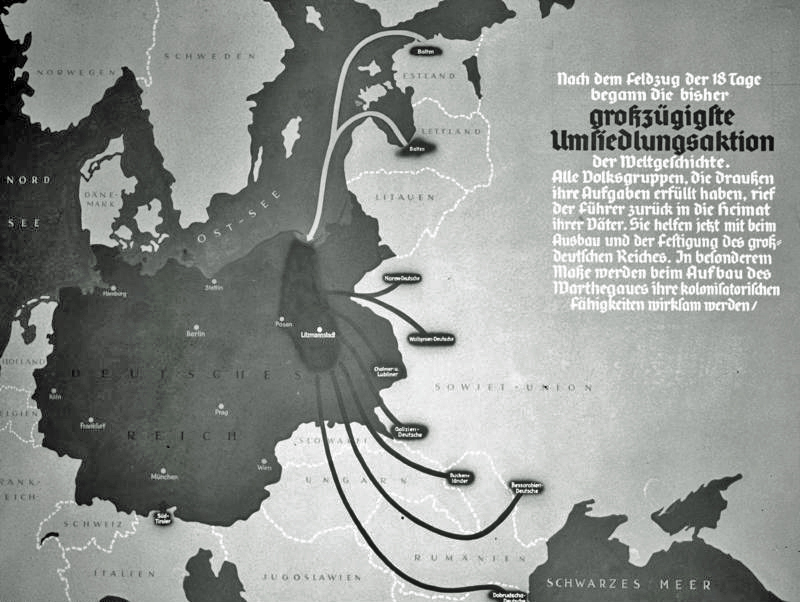
Settlement of Volksdeutsche from Eastern Europe in Polish territories incorporated into the Reich as part of the Heim ins Reich action

Simultaneously with the displacement of the Polish and Jewish populations, the German settlement and colonization campaign continued. Approximately 60,000 Reichsdeutsche – usually representatives of the German occupation apparatus together with their families – settled in the area of the pre-war Pomeranian Voivodeship.

Gauleiter Forster was reluctant to settle Volksdeutsche in the province of Danzig-West Prussia. He officially promised Himmler that he would accept approximately 25,000–30,000 Baltic Germans, but in reality he sabotaged the project with all his might, raising various formal and logistical objections (e.g., claiming that there were not enough apartments and farms for the settlers). As a result, only 5,966 Baltic Germans settled in Reichsgau Danzig-West Prussia, of whom 3,309 settled in Gdańsk District, 2,026 in Bydgoszcz District, and 631 in Kwidzyn District. Most of the settlers found employment in industry and trade, and only 645 in agriculture. Forster's efforts to curb the settlement of Volksdeutsche from other regions of Eastern Europe ended in failure. Between 1940 and 1941, 40,836 Germans from Bessarabia and about 8,000 Germans from Lithuania were settled in Reichsgau Danzig-West Prussia. Most of them were settled in Bydgoszcz District (approximately 26,000). In total, approximately 57,000 Volksdeutsche from the East were settled in the occupied territory of Pomerania during World War II.

The villages where Germans were settled had to be in a good "political" and economic situation, have a favorable population structure and transport links, and be located on fertile farmland. The relations between Germans and Poles in a given area were also taken into account. Efforts were made to create medium-sized farms for Germans, the size of which depended on the size of the farms they had before arriving in the territories incorporated into the Reich (but not less than 60–80 morgen). Preserved documentation from the Resettlement Center in Gdańsk indicates, for example, that 7,388 farms with a total area of 152,609.9 hectares were prepared for 32,697 settlers from Eastern Europe. Volksdeutsche were also settled in cities – mainly in Gdynia (2,800 people), Bydgoszcz (2,000 people), and Toruń (700 people). In order to make it easier for German settlers to start a new life, special concessions were prepared for them, including exemption from gift and inheritance taxes, property tax, and military tax. They were also granted interest-free loans for settlement and compensated for the value of property left behind in the East.

== Conclusion ==
Due to the unfavorable political and military situation in which the Third Reich found itself, in January 1943, the German authorities suspended the resettlement operations in Pomerania related to the settlement of Volksdeutsche from Eastern Europe. In February 1943, the camp in Smukała near Bydgoszcz was liquidated, and in June 1943, the camp in Toruń's "Smalcówka" was also closed. The prisoners of both dissolved camps were sent to Potulice, which had already been transformed into the main labor camp in the province of Danzig-West Prussia in September 1942. The headquarters of the Resettlement Center was also moved to Potulice, but it was soon liquidated and its duties were taken over by the camp command. However, sporadic local resettlements continued to take place in Pomerania, for example in connection with the construction of military facilities (including in the vicinity of Brusy, where an SS training ground was established in the village of Wielkie Chełmy in the autumn of 1943).

It is difficult to accurately estimate the number of Poles displaced from Pomerania by the Germans during World War II. (Note: According to the definition developed by Czesław Madajczyk, "Nazi resettlement" should be understood as all forms of forced displacement of non-German populations, i.e. expulsion or eviction, certain forms of evacuation, mass and long-term abandonment of previous places of residence, long-term bans on return, voluntary repatriation of Germans, participation in settlement, and forced settlement (Chrzanowski (2004, p. 35)).) Based on preserved documentation from the Resettlement Center in Gdańsk, Włodzimierz Jastrzębski estimated that by January 1943, 121,765 inhabitants of Pomerania (10% of the Polish population living in Reichsgau Danzig-West Prussia) had been displaced by January 1943, of which 91,533 were deported to the General Government, and 30,232 were expelled as part of internal resettlements, imprisoned in resettlement camps, or sent to forced labor. Czesław Łuczak also estimated the number of people displaced from Pomerania at around 120,000 (plus an unknown number of victims of "wild" expulsions). According to Jan Sziling, during World War II, approximately 170,000 inhabitants of Pomerania were subjected to all forms of German resettlement.

== Bibliography ==
- Biskup, Marian, ed. (2004). Historia Bydgoszczy [History of Bydgoszcz] (in Polish). Vol. II. Bydgoszcz: Bydgoszcz Scientific Society. ISBN 83-921454-0-2.
- Böhler, Jochen; Mallmann, Klaus-Michael; Matthäus, Jürgen (2009). Einsatzgruppen w Polsce [Einsatzgruppen in Poland] (in Polish). Warsaw: Bellona. ISBN 978-83-11-11588-0.
- Borzyszkowski, Józef, ed. (2004). Wysiedlenia na Pomorzu w latach 1939–1948 [Expulsions in Pomerania 1939–1948] (in Polish). Gdańsk-Wejherowo: Kashubian Institute & Museum of Kashubian-Pomeranian Literature and Music.
- Chrzanowski, Bogdan (May 2004). "Wypędzenia z Pomorza" [Expulsions from Pomerania]. Biuletyn IPN (in Polish). 5 (40).
- Ciechanowski, Konrad (1988). Stutthof: hitlerowski obóz koncentracyjny [Stutthof: A Nazi Concentration Camp] (in Polish). Warsaw: Interpress. ISBN 83-223-2369-7.
- Gąsiorowski, Andrzej, ed. (2009). Kościerzyna i powiat kościerski w latach II wojny światowej 1939–1945 [Kościerzyna and Kościerzyna County during World War II 1939–1945] (in Polish). Kościerzyna: Kościerzyna Land Museum. ISBN 978-83-926124-8-3.
- Jastrzębski, Włodzimierz (1968). Hitlerowskie wysiedlenia z ziem polskich wcielonych do Rzeszy 1939–1945 [Nazi Expulsions from the Polish Territories Incorporated into the Reich 1939–1945] (in Polish). Poznań: Instytut Zachodni.
- Jastrzębski, Włodzimierz; Sziling, Jan (1979). Okupacja hitlerowska na Pomorzu Gdańskim w latach 1939–1945 [Nazi Occupation of Gdańsk Pomerania 1939–1945] (in Polish). Gdańsk: Wydawnictwo Morskie.
- Łuczak, Czesław (1972). Wysiedlenia hitlerowskie na tak zwanych „ziemiach wschodnich" wcielonych do Rzeszy [Nazi Expulsions in the So-Called "Eastern Territories" Incorporated into the Reich] (in Polish). Zamość: UMCS.
- Minczykowska, Katarzyna; Sziling, Jan (2005). Władze i społeczeństwo niemieckie na Pomorzu Wschodnim i Kujawach w latach okupacji niemieckiej (1939–1945) [German Authorities and Society in Eastern Pomerania and Kuyavia during the German Occupation (1939–1945)] (in Polish). Toruń: Pomeranian Home Army and Polish Women’s Military Service Archive and Museum Foundation. ISBN 83-88693-07-7.
- Schenk, Dieter (2002). Albert Forster. Gdański namiestnik Hitlera [Albert Forster: Hitler's Gauleiter in Gdańsk] (in Polish). Gdańsk: Oskar. ISBN 83-86181-83-4.
- Tomkiewicz, Monika (2003–2004). "Wysiedlenia z Gdyni w 1939 roku" [Expulsions from Gdynia in 1939]. Biuletyn IPN (in Polish). 12–1 (35–36).
- Wardzyńska, Maria (2009). Był rok 1939. Operacja niemieckiej policji bezpieczeństwa w Polsce. Intelligenzaktion [It Was 1939: The German Security Police Operation in Poland. Intelligenzaktion] (in Polish). Warsaw: Institute of National Remembrance. ISBN 978-83-7629-063-8.
- Widernik, Mieczysław, ed. (2001). Dzieje Kartuz [History of Kartuzy] (in Polish). Vol. II. Kartuzy: Gmina Kartuzy. ISBN 83-916406-0-4.
