= SS Wachsturmbann "Eimann" =

SS unit formed in the Free City of Danzig in 1939

- Active: July 1939–February 1940
- Country: Free City of Danzig (1920–1939); Nazi Germany (1939–1940)
- Branch: SS
- Type: Paramilitary
- Role: Infantry
- Size: Approx. 550 personnel
- Garrison/HQ: Gdańsk Pomerania
- Engagements: World War II; Invasion of Poland

Commanders
- First commander: Kurt Eimann

SS Wachsturmbann "Eimann" was a special SS unit established by a decree of the Senate of the Free City of Danzig on 3 July 1939, based on the local 36th SS Regiment. The unit was commanded by SS-Obersturmbannführer Kurt Eimann, after whom it was named.

During the early months of the German occupation, SS Wachsturmbann "Eimann" committed numerous atrocities against the population of Gdańsk Pomerania, including the execution of the defenders of the Polish Post Office in Danzig and participation in mass executions in the Piaśnica forests. The unit played a key role in the liquidation of psychiatric hospital patients in Pomerania and the Third Reich. Additionally, it formed the initial staff of the Stutthof concentration camp.

== Formation ==
In preparation for the German invasion of Poland, the Nazi-controlled authorities of the Free City of Danzig, along with local NSDAP structures, secretly expanded the city's police and paramilitary forces. By the mid-1930s, Danzig's police force comprised an 8,000-strong protective police corps and a several-thousand-strong Landespolizei, stationed in barracks in Wrzeszcz. These could be reinforced by local SS and SA units, totaling around 10,000 members, as well as paramilitary organizations like Stahlhelm and Soldatenbund, consisting of several thousand reservists.

Reichsführer-SS Heinrich Himmler played a significant role in Danzig's remilitarization, secretly visiting the city in June and July 1939. During a meeting with Gauleiter Albert Forster, Himmler deemed the existing SS forces in Danzig insufficient and decided to strengthen them. Consequently, in July 1939, a heavily armed, approximately 1,500-strong unit, SS Heimwehr Danzig, was formed, partially composed of SS members illegally transferred from the Reich.

Still deemed inadequate, the Senate of the Free City of Danzig issued a decree on 3 July 1939, establishing the SS-Wachsturmbann ("SS Guard and Assault Unit"). The unit was led by SS-Obersturmbannführer Kurt Eimann, former commander of the 36th SS Regiment, whose subordinates formed the core of the new unit. (Note: Eimann was not well-regarded by his superiors, who criticized his lack of initiative and flair (Schenk (2002, p. 263)).) The unit was named after Eimann. Its maintenance and equipment costs were covered by the Danzig police, funded by the Reich Ministry of Finance through allocations to the Free City authorities. Until the outbreak of war, Eimann's unit was the most expensive to maintain among Danzig's police forces.

Organizationally, the SS-Wachsturmbann reported directly to the Senate of the Free City of Danzig and Police President Helmut Froeböss. After the war's outbreak and the annexation of the Free City into the Reich, it was subordinated to Gauleiter Forster and the commander of the Schutzpolizei in Danzig. Before the war, the unit served as a "police auxiliary battalion". By late August 1939, it comprised about 550 personnel, organized into four Hundertschaften (sotnias, companies) and one Kraftfahrstaffel (transport company). The unit's staff included SS-Sturmbannführer Max Pauly, former commander of Danzig's 71st SS Regiment and later commandant of the Stutthof and Neuengamme concentration camps.

In July 1939, Danzig SS members received call-up notices for service in "security units". They were mustered at the Schutzpolizei barracks in Wrzeszcz (present-day 15 Juliusz Słowacki Street), where they were divided into companies. After receiving equipment and weapons, they were billeted in various locations in and around Danzig, including Wrzeszcz (in buildings now part of Gdańsk University of Technology), Victoriaschule, Jankowo Gdańskie (site of an NSDAP school), Sztutowo, and Komary near Świbno. The SS members underwent intensive military and ideological training. They also performed guard duties at the city gasworks, power plant, pumping station, port, and major warehouses and industrial facilities. One detachment escorted prisoners from Danzig jails to Świnoujście. Others were assigned to various Danzig police precincts for patrol duties.

== Role in the invasion of Poland ==
By late August 1939, SS Wachsturmbann "Eimann" was concentrated in Danzig. Its companies were assigned specific tasks for the war's outbreak. Two companies, under Max Pauly's command, were designated for guard duties at Victoriaschule (where a temporary internment camp was established) and the newly created Stutthof concentration camp. The remaining three companies were tasked with arresting individuals listed on pre-prepared proscription lists and, alongside SS Heimwehr Danzig and the police, seizing Polish facilities in the Free City of Danzig.

In early September 1939, the unit participated in capturing Polish strongholds in Danzig, including the Polish Railway Directorate and the Polish Post Office in Danzig, and took part in the fighting at Westerplatte. The unit suffered 12 killed and 20 wounded during these operations. After combat ended, half the unit was assigned to guard prisoner-of-war and internment camps, while the remainder was designated for "special tasks".

== War crimes ==
SS Wachsturmbann "Eimann" had a limited role in combat operations in Pomerania, as it was primarily conceived as Danzig's autonomous equivalent to the German security police and security service (Einsatzgruppen). Its primary mission was the suppression of the Polish population in Danzig and Pomerania. Notably, the unit was formed at the initiative of Danzig's Nazis without official approval from Berlin, effectively functioning as a private death squad under Gauleiter Forster and Pomerania's SS and Police Leader, SS-Gruppenführer Richard Hildebrandt. This provoked the ire of Himmler, who accused Hildebrandt of insubordination in mid-December 1939.

From 1 September 1939, Eimann's SS members conducted mass arrests of Poles in the Free City of Danzig. They staffed makeshift internment camps at Victoriaschule, Neufahrwasser, Grenzdorf, and other locations, where Polish prisoners faced brutal torture and abuse.

After the September Campaign, SS Wachsturmbann "Eimann" supported police, gendarmerie, and Selbstschutz units in arresting Poles on the Gdańsk Coast. Its members conducted arrests and summary executions in Starogard Gdański, Kościerzyna, Kartuzy, and Wejherowo, and escorted Pomeranian Jews to ghettos in Vienna and Bratislava. The unit was a key participant in the arrests and expulsions of residents from Orłowo and Gdynia.

=== Execution of Polish Post Office defenders ===
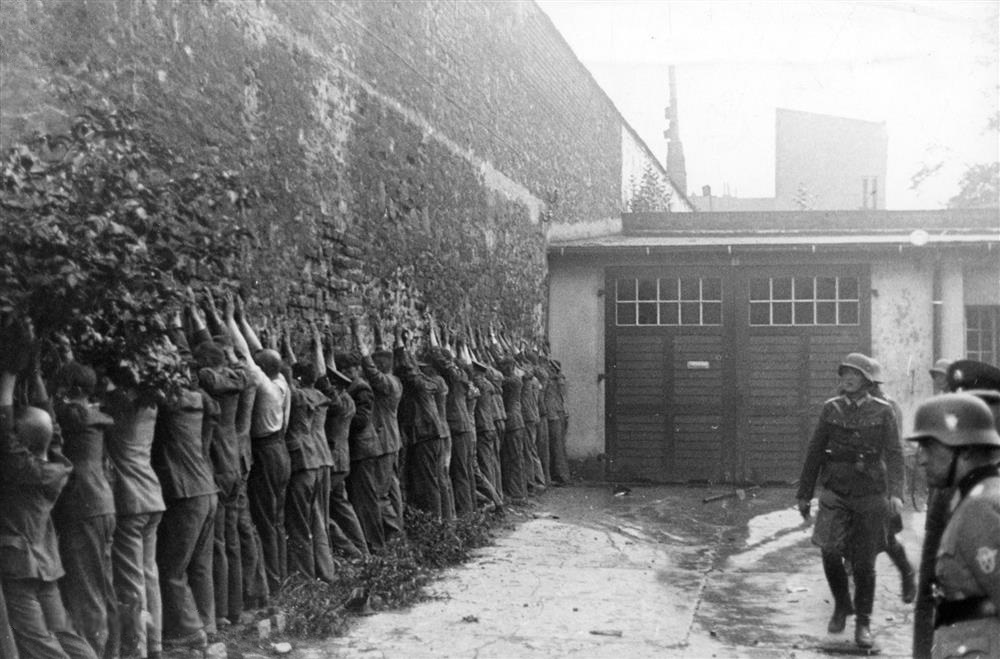
1 September 1939 – Polish postal workers from Gdańsk against the wall

On 1 September 1939, after hours of fierce resistance, the Polish Post Office in Danzig capitulated under assault by overwhelming SA and SS forces. The 38 captured postal workers were accused of "partisan activities" and, after a mock trial, sentenced to death.

The execution took place around 4:00 AM on 5 October 1939 at a police training ground in Zaspa. The firing squad consisted of SS Wachsturmbann "Eimann" members, personally led by Max Pauly.

Pauly ordered us, the prisoners, to remove rings from the victims' fingers and knock out their gold teeth, stating they would be given to their families. However, the officer reading the verdict forbade this. Pauly then began removing rings from the corpses himself and ordered me and Garczyński to enter the grave and arrange the bodies in a single layer [...] When we had the bodies arranged, we called to our fellow prisoners to help us out of the grave by offering their hands, but Pauly interrupted, declaring we would remain in the grave. The aforementioned officer intervened, stating that all prisoners must return to the camp from which they were taken.

— Testimony of Aleksy Rosiński

=== Participation in Piaśnica massacres ===
Following the occupation of Pomerania, the Germans targeted Polish political, economic, and intellectual elites, whom they blamed for interwar Polonization policies and viewed as obstacles to rapid Germanization. Polish historians estimate that between September 1939 and spring 1940, from 36,000 to 50,000 people were killed in the Reichsgau Danzig-West Prussia. German historian Dieter Schenk estimated that from 52,794 to 60,750 individuals were murdered across 432 locations in Pomerania during this period.

SS Wachsturmbann "Eimann", alongside Einsatzkommando 16 and the Wejherowo Selbstschutz (a paramilitary group of ethnic Germans from prewar Poland), participated in the Piaśnica massacres. It is estimated that Eimann's SS members could execute around 150 people daily. Some wounded victims were finished off with rifle butt blows, as evidenced by shattered skulls found in mass graves. Witnesses and forensic evidence confirm that victims were tortured before execution. Some accounts describe the brutal killing of small children by smashing their heads against tree trunks.

=== Murder of psychiatric patients ===
Nazi ideology deemed the mentally ill "unfit for social coexistence and leading lives unworthy of life". The outbreak of war provided the Nazis an opportunity to begin their extermination, euphemistically termed "euthanasia". The killing of psychiatric patients in Polish territories began in the occupation's early weeks. In Pomerania, Kurt Eimann was tasked with "emptying" local psychiatric and care facilities of patients.

Postwar, Eimann claimed he was horrified by the task but executed it meticulously. Without seeking further instructions from his superiors regarding the execution of the order, he resolved to carry out the intended killings with the men of his unit. According to his plan, in order to ensure the smooth course of the operation, the patients were killed individually with a shot to the back of the head, and were kept unaware of their fate until the very end. (Note: In some cases, to "save ammunition", patients were killed with rifle butt blows (Schenk (2002, p. 264)).) Eimann selected suitable execution sites in advance. Before the killings, he and his men were trained at a psychiatric hospital, where they were taught that "healthy animals kill the sick" in nature.

Eimann's unit liquidated the Kocborowo Psychiatric Hospital in Starogard Gdański, where 1,680 patients were shot or killed with lethal injections in the Szpęgawsk Forest. They also murdered 1,700 patients from the Świecie Regional Psychiatric Hospital, with 1,350 shot at a gravel pit in Mniszek and the rest in Szpęgawsk Forest. Among the victims were 120 children, transported for execution under the pretense of a field trip. The hospital director, Józef Bednarz, refused to flee and accompanied his patients to their deaths.

After "clearing" Pomeranian facilities, SS Wachsturmbann "Eimann" killed approximately 2,000 patients from German psychiatric hospitals in Lębork, Stralsund, Ueckermünde, and Berlin's Treptow, transported to occupied territories for extermination. Eimann personally supervised every detail of these mass shootings.

=== Stutthof concentration camp ===
In August 1939, SS Wachsturmbann "Eimann" members, led by Obersturmführer Erich Gust, oversaw construction of the Stutthof concentration camp. After the war began and the camp officially opened on 2 September 1939, the unit's members formed its initial staff. Max Pauly, a staff member of SS Wachsturmbann "Eimann", oversaw the camp as head of the Danzig Prisoner-of-War Camp Command and served as Stutthof's commandant from 1 April 1940 to 31 August 1942.

=== Berlin Police ===
In 1940, after the Intelligenzaktion in Pomerania, about 500 SS Wachsturmbann "Eimann" members joined the German police in Berlin. Their superiors doubted their ability to resume normal lives and uphold law in the capital:

One of the police units returning from Poland was read an order from the Reichsinnenministerium, stating that they must again act in accordance with the law and regulations and maintain absolute silence about events in Poland. None of these murderers from various formations were held accountable for crimes committed in Poland, as they were covered by a secret amnesty decree issued by Hitler on 4 October 1939.

== Dissolution and postwar fate ==
Kurt Eimann commanded the unit until December 1939. It was disbanded between January and February 1940. The identities of most SS Wachsturmbann "Eimann" members remain unknown, as many were transferred to other units and locations after their tasks. Likely, most joined the Waffen-SS 3rd SS Panzer Division Totenkopf, alongside SS Heimwehr Danzig members. Eimann himself rose to the rank of SS lieutenant colonel in the armored troops.

Most of the unit's over 500 members were never held accountable for their crimes. Only a few, mainly Stutthof staff, faced justice. Max Pauly was tried by the British in the first Neuengamme trial, sentenced to death by hanging on 3 May 1946, and executed in October that year. His indictment did not cover crimes committed in Pomerania.

In 1968, Kurt Eimann was tried in Hanover for his role in the extermination of psychiatric patients. He admitted to killing 1,200 German hospital patients in Piaśnica and was sentenced to four years in prison, serving two.

== See also ==
- Volksdeutscher Selbstschutz

== Bibliography ==
- Ciechanowski, Konrad (1988). Stutthof: hitlerowski obóz koncentracyjny [Stutthof: Hitler's Concentration Camp] (in Polish). Warsaw: Interpress. ISBN 83-223-2369-7.
- Schenk, Dieter (2002). Albert Forster. Gdański namiestnik Hitlera [Albert Forster: Hitler's Governor in Danzig] (in Polish). Gdańsk: Oskar. ISBN 83-86181-83-4.
