= Alicja Kotowska =

Polish Roman Catholic nun and martyr

Blessed Alicja Jadwiga Kotowska CR
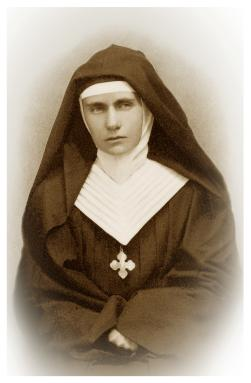
- Alicja Kotowska, c. 1938

Virgin and martyr
- Born: Maria Jadwiga Kotowska; 20 November 1899; Warsaw, Vistula Land, Russian Empire
- Died: 11 November 1939 (aged 39); Wielka Piaśnica, Nazi Germany
- Venerated in: Roman Catholic Church
- Beatified: 13 June 1999, Warsaw, Poland by Pope John Paul II
- Feast: 11 November

Alicja Jadwiga Kotowska (20 November 1899, Warsaw – 11 November 1939, near Wielka Piaśnica) was a Polish religious sister who was head of the Resurrectionist convent in Wejherowo between 1934 and 1939. She was arrested by the Gestapo on 24 October 1939 during prayer and murdered alongside over 300 other Poles and Jews on 11 November in one of the Piaśnica massacres. Witnesses reported seeing her comfort Jewish children while being transported. She was beatified by the Roman Catholic Church in 1999 as one of the 108 Martyrs of World War II.

== Life ==
Kotowska was born on 20 November 1899 to a devout Catholic family, the second of eight children. During World War I she worked as a nurse. She took her vows on 2 February 1924, but continued her academic studies in addition to her duties, earning a master's degree in chemistry in 1929. She later worked as a teacher and headmistress of a school.

== Death ==
She was arrested by the Gestapo on 24 October 1939 during prayer and murdered alongside over 300 other Poles and Jews on 11 November in one of the Piaśnica massacres. Witnesses reported seeing her comfort Jewish children while being transported.

== Bibliography ==
- Like a Drop of Water in the Ocean: The Life and Martyrdom of Blessed Sister Alice Kotowska, Sister of the Resurection [sic]. Congregation of the Sisters of the Resurrection. 1999. ISBN 9788391177532..
- Błgosławiona siostra Alicja Kotowska (in Polish). Wydawnictwo Duszpasterstwa Rolników. 2001. ISBN 9788388743511..
- Miłość jest wierna do końca: błogosławiona Alicja Kotowska Zmartwychwstanka (in Polish). Zgromadzenie Sióstr Zmartwychwstania Pańskiego. 2001. ISBN 9788391177525..
- Alicja Marie Jadwiga Kotowska, in Wielka encyklopedia Jana Pawła II (in Polish). Vol. 1. Wydawn: Edipresse. 2005. ISBN 9788372986436..
