= Piaśnica massacres =

Massacres perpetrated by Nazi Germany

Coordinates: 54°40′40″N 18°10′34″E

The massacres in Piaśnica were a series of mass murders carried out by Nazi Germany during World War II, between the fall of 1939 and spring of 1940 in Piaśnica Wielka (Groß Piasnitz) in the Darzlubska Wilderness near Wejherowo. The exact number of people murdered is unknown, but estimates range between 12,000 and 14,000 victims. Most of them were Polish intellectuals from Gdańsk Pomerania, but Poles, Kashubians, Jews, Czechs and German inmates from mental hospitals from the General Government and the Third Reich were also murdered. After the Stutthof concentration camp, Piaśnica was the largest site of killings of Polish civilians in Pomerania by the Germans, and for this reason, is sometimes referred to as the "second" or "Pomeranian" Katyn. It was the first large-scale Nazi atrocity in occupied Poland.

== Background: Intelligenzaktion Pommern ==
After the German invasion of Poland, the Polish and Kashubian population of Gdańsk Pomerania was immediately subjected to brutal terror. Prisoners of war, as well as many Polish intellectuals and community leaders, were murdered. Many of the crimes were carried out, with official approval, by the so-called "Volksdeutscher Selbstschutz", or paramilitary organizations of ethnic Germans with previously Polish citizenship. They, in turn, were encouraged to participate in the violence and pogroms by the Gauleiter of Danzig-West Prussia, Albert Forster, who in a speech at the Prusinski Hotel in Wejherowo agitated ethnic Germans to attack Poles by saying "We have to eliminate the lice-ridden Poles, starting with those in the cradle... in your hands I give the fate of the Poles, you can do with them what you want". The crowd gathered before the hotel chanted "Kill the Polish dogs!" and "Death to the Poles". The Selbstschutz participated in the early massacres at Piaśnica, and many of their members later joined police and SS formations which continued the massacres until the fall of 1940.

Organized action aimed at exterminating the Polish population of the region, however, began only after the end of the September campaign, with the Intelligenzaktion in Pomerania (Intelligence Action Pomerania), a part of an overall Intelligenzaktion by Germany aimed at liquidating the Polish elite. Its main targets were the Polish intelligentsia, which was blamed by the Nazis for pro-Polish policies in the Polish corridor during the interwar period. Educated Poles were also perceived by the Nazis as the main obstacle to the planned complete Germanization of the region.

As a result, even before the Nazi invasion of Poland, German police and Gestapo prepared special lists of Poles which they regarded as representative of Polish culture and life in the region, who were to be executed. According to official criteria, the Polish "intelligentsia" included anyone with a middle school or higher education, priests, teachers, doctors, dentists, veterinarians, military officers, bureaucrats, medium and large businessmen and merchants, medium and large landowners, writers, journalists and newspaper editors. Furthermore, all persons who during the interwar period had belonged to Polish cultural and patriotic organizations such as Polski Związek Zachodni (Polish Union of the West) and Maritime and Colonial League.

As a result, between the fall of 1939 and the spring of 1940, in the Intelligenzaktion Pommern and other actions, Germans killed around 65,000 Polish intellectuals and others. The main site of these murders were the forests around Wielka Piaśnica.

== The executions ==
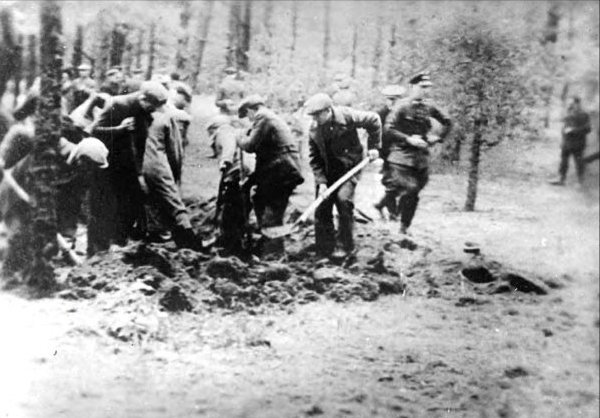
Digging the graves

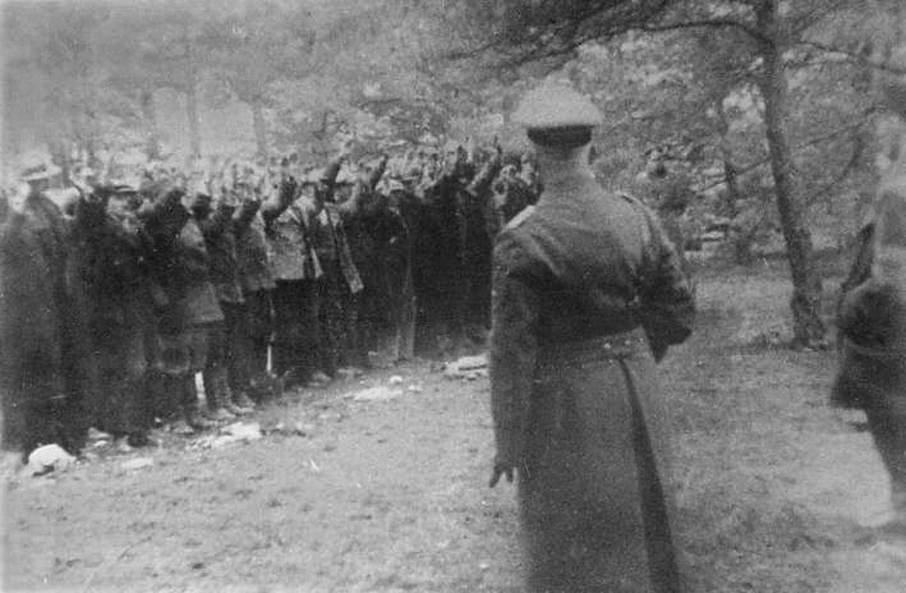
Victims before the execution

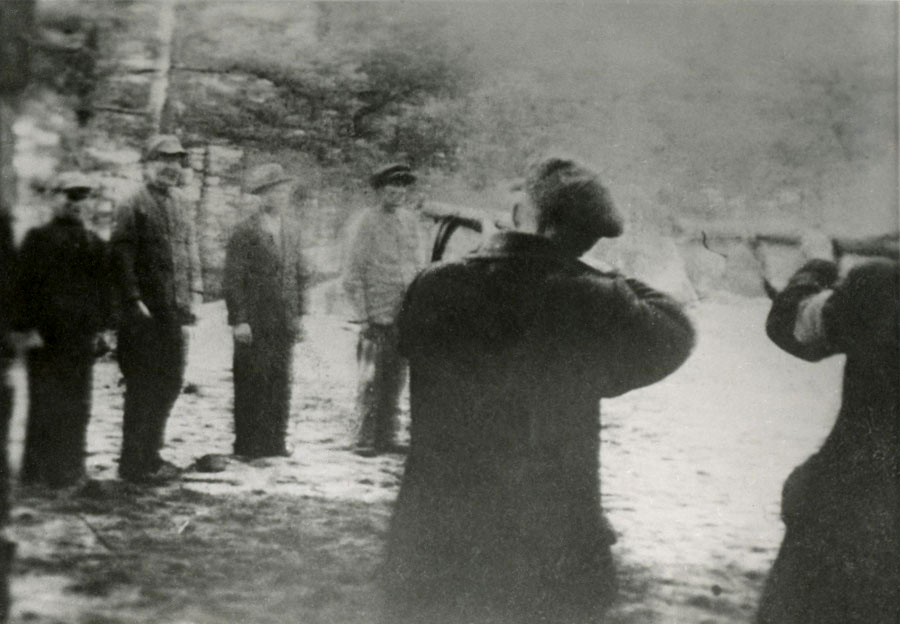
Mass execution in Piaśnica

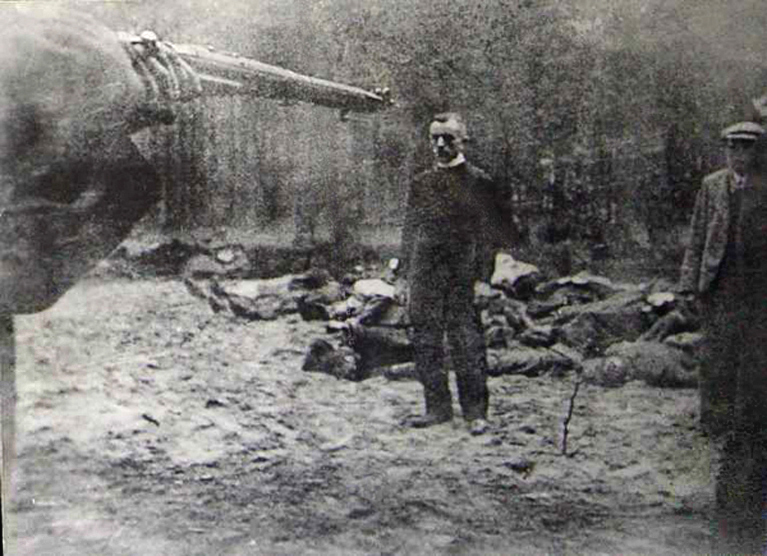
Moments before the execution

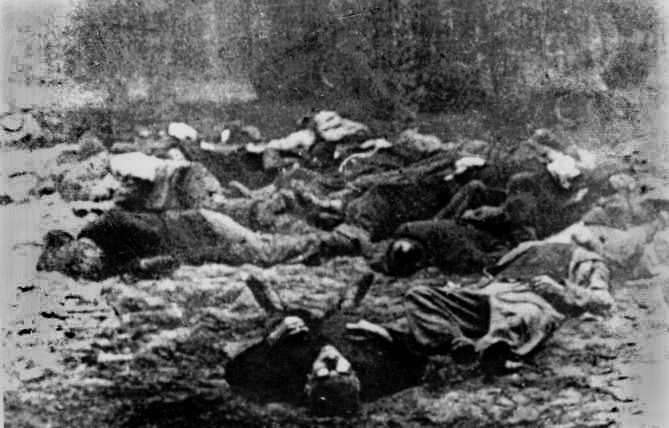
Bodies of the victims

Piaśnica Wielka is a small Kashubian village located around 10 km from Wejherowo. The forests around it were chosen by the Germans as the site of the mass murders because it was easily accessible by bus and truck, it had a nearby rail line, and at the same time, it was located far enough from other villages and centers of population.

The most commonly accepted timeline for the beginnings of the executions is late October 1939. However, the date of the first execution is uncertain and disputed among historians. According to Zygmunt Milczewski, this happened on 21 October. Prof. Andrzej Gąsiorowski states that the first person to be killed was the priest, Father Ignacy Błażejewski, on 24 October. Prof. Barbara Bojarska gives the date as 29 October. Former prisoners and witnesses likewise give various dates at the end of October, and even the first few days of November.

The victims were transported to the execution sites by cars and trucks. Usually, they were forced to strip and on some occasions to dig their own graves. They were then lined up on the edge of the ditches they had dug and machined-gunned down, although sometimes regular rifles and pistols were also used. Some of the wounded were finished off with blows of rifle butts, as is documented by the broken skulls that have been exhumed from the graves. Estimates and records suggest that a single platoon of the 36th SS Regiment Wachsturmbann "Eimann", named after its commander Kurt Eimann, involved in the massacres was capable of killing around 150 people daily. Witnesses report that on numerous occasions, prior to the executions, the victims were tortured and children, in particular, were treated with utmost cruelty, and often killed by having their heads smashed against trees by German SS soldiers.

The most detailed accounts of one of the executions come from witness accounts regarding 11 November, (Polish Independence Day). On that day, Germans murdered around 314 Polish and Jewish hostages in Piaśnica. According to the testimony of former Gestapo and later, Smersh agent, Hans Kassner (alias Jan Kaszubowski), made in 1952, the executions on that day lasted from early morning until three in the afternoon. Men and women were led in fives to the previously dug graves and shot. Some of the victims were buried alive. One of those killed was Sister Alicja Kotowska, the head of the convent in Wejherowo. Witnesses report that as she was being transported from the prison to the execution site, Kotowska huddled and comforted Jewish children who were also being taken to be executed at Piaśnica. During the post-war exhumation, Alicja's corpse was not identified but a grave was found containing a rosary of the kind worn by sisters of her order. The grave where the rosary was found is now the site of a memorial. In 1999 Alicja Kotowska was beatified by Pope John Paul II along with 107 other martyrs.

The area around the forests where the massacres were taking place was surrounded with police and paramilitary groups in order both to prevent any victims from escaping and also to preclude access to any potential witnesses from the outside. Despite these arrangements, the local Polish and Kashubian populace was able to observe the numerous transports going to the forests and could hear the sounds of gunfire.

The last transports to the site were seen in the spring of 1940 and contained mostly patients from mental hospitals from within the Third Reich, in particular from Stettin (Szczecin) and Lauenburg (Lębork).

The total number of victims, killed in an area around Piaśnica of about 250 square kilometers, is estimated at between twelve and sixteen thousand, including women, children and infants.

== The victims ==
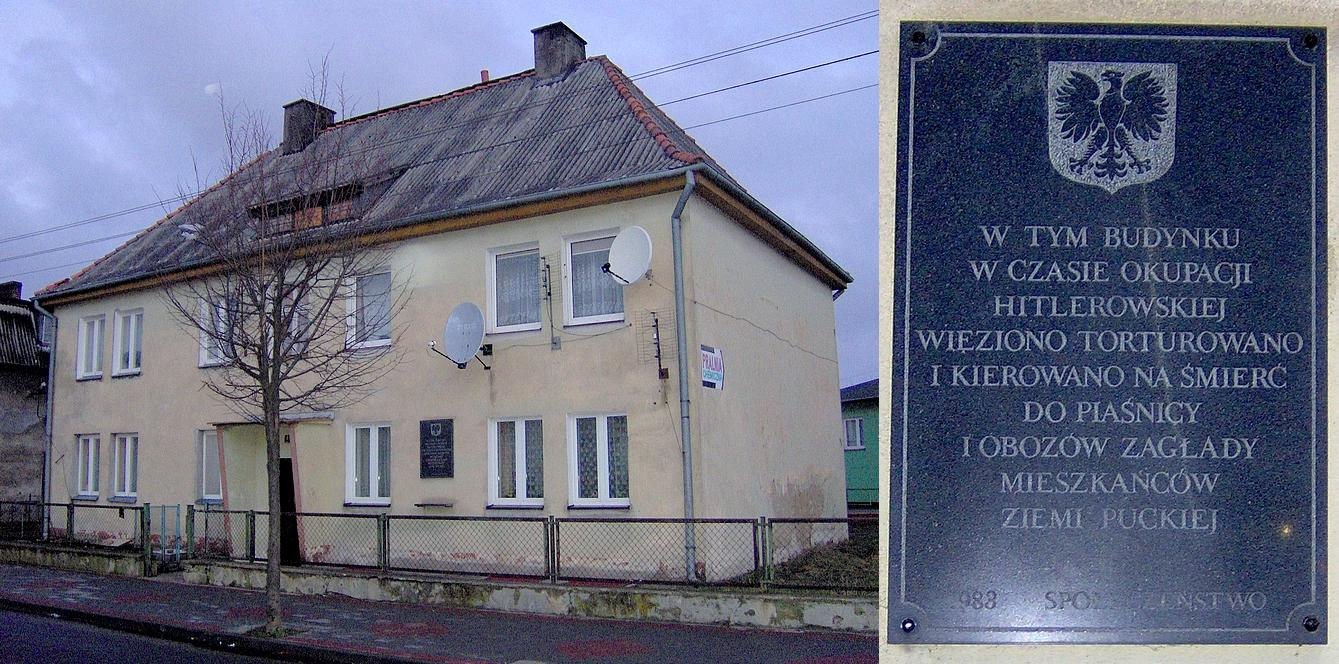
The prison in Puck where victims were held and tortured before being shipped to Piaśnica, along with a plaque

Due to the fact that in 1944, the Germans exhumed and burned many of the corpses in an attempt to hide the crime, the exact number of victims is not known, nor are many of their names and national origins. From investigations carried out after the war, three different groups of victims can be identified:

- The first group of about 2,000 persons, mostly Poles and Kashubians from Gdańsk Pomerania, arrested in September and October 1939 and subsequently held in prisons in Wejherowo, Puck, Gdańsk, Kartuzy, and Kościerzyna.
- The second group, the largest, of 10,000 to 12,000 people, consisted of Polish, Czech and German families who had been transported from other areas of General Government and the Third Reich. This group also included many Polish workers who had migrated to Germany for economic reasons in the interwar period. The estimated number is based on the mass graves that had been found and on eyewitness reports by railroad men who observed the arriving transports.
- The third group included about 1,200 (some sources give 2,000) mentally ill patients, transported from hospitals in Stralsund, Ueckermünde, Altentreptow and Lauenburg (Lębork).

Investigations carried out so far (2009) have established the names of about 600 of the 12,000 to 14,000 murdered.

== The perpetrators ==
There were three groups which were primarily involved in carrying out the massacres:

- Einsatzkommando 16, under the command of the chief of the Gdańsk Gestapo SS-Obersturmbannführer Rudolf Tröger
- Special units of the Wachsturmbann "Eimann" from the 36th Regiment of SS
- Local ethnic Germans from Wejherowo, members of Selbstschutz, led by the German mayor of Wejherowo Gustaw Bamberger and the county director of the Nazi Party Heinz Lorentz.

The headquarters of the command in charge of carrying out the ethnic cleansing was in a villa on Krokowska St. in Wejherowo.

== Attempts at hiding the murders ==
After the extermination action was ended in the spring of 1940, the organizers and perpetrators began the process of covering their deeds. Trees and bushes were planted on the site of the graves, and German police restricted access to the area in the following years.

In the second half of 1944, during the Red Army's offensive, Nazi authorities anticipated the evacuation of the German military and civilian personnel. During this time, an organized action was undertaken to destroy evidence of the massacres. Thirty-six prisoners from the concentration camp KL Stutthof were chosen and brought to the forests in August 1944. Chained and bound, they were forced to dig up the graves, remove the bodies and burn them in specially prepared forest crematoria. After six weeks of this work, the prisoners were murdered by the SS troops who supervised them, and their bodies were burned as well. Local German civilians participated in further covering up any traces of the burning of the bodies.

Despite the attempts by the Germans to cover up the massacre, photographs of the events survived. Two local Germans, Georg and Waldemar Engler who ran a photography studio in Wejherowo took part in the massacres as part of the paramilitary organizations. The younger Engler, Waldemar, made a photographic record of the massacre. Both of them were tried and sentenced for war crimes after the war.

== Punishment and responsibility ==
In 1946 a National Tribunal in Gdańsk, Poland, held Albert Forster, the Gauleiter of the Gdańsk Region and the Nazi administrator of Pomerania and Western Prussia, responsible for the murders at Piaśnica, as well as for other war crimes. He was sentenced to death and the sentence was carried out on 28 February 1952, in Warsaw.

A West German court in Hamburg in 1968 sentenced SS leader Kurt Eimann to four years in prison for his participation in the killing of the German mentally ill at Piaśnica (but not the Polish intellectuals and citizens also murdered there).

Richard Hildebrandt, Higher SS and Police Leader in Pomerania, was sentenced to death by a Polish court in Bydgoszcz for his part and role in organizing the murders. A British military court in Hamburg in 1946, sentenced Max Pauly, the former commander of the Stutthof Concentration Camp and also the commander of the Neuengamme concentration camp to death for war crimes. During the proceedings, Pauly did not reveal that he had also taken part in the executions at Piaśnica, Stutthof and other places in German-occupied Pomerania. The sentence was carried out at Hameln Prison in 1946, by Albert Pierrepoint. The occupation mayor of Puck, F. Freimann, was also sentenced to death by a court in Gdynia.

== See also ==
- Palmiry massacre
