= Barbara Bojarska =

Polish historian, author and long-term research scientist

Piaśnica by Barbara Bojarska
- Occupation: Research scientist at Western Institute (IZ)
- Known for: Forensic investigation into Massacres in Piaśnica

Barbara Bojarska is a Polish historian, prize-winning author, and former long-term research scientist at the Western Institute (Instytut Zachodni) in Poznań, where she received her doctorate for the work about Massacres in Piaśnica. Her books are devoted almost entirely to history of Pomerania with special focus on the World War II atrocities committed against ethnic Poles by Nazi Germany during Operation Tannenberg.

Bojarska began her scientific career at the Institute, as the research aid to Professor Karol Pospieszalski in 1958–1966, director of the Research Department of History of Nazi Occupation of Poland (Zakład Badania Dziejów Okupacji Hitlerowskiej w Polsce). She was traveling between Potsdam and Magdeburg, collecting data about the fate of Poles during the genocidal Intelligenzaktion Pommern. Since then, she wrote numerous publications on the subject widely cited by Polish as well as German historians. Her first ground-breaking research into the Massacres in Piaśnica was published in 1964 when still little was known about it. Her subsequent Piaśnica monograph was released by Zakład Ossolineum in Wrocław in 1978 and since reprinted several times.

== Selected publications ==
- Barbara Bojarska (1963), Zbrodnie Selbstschutzu w Łobżenicy, Przegląd Zachodni, pp. 5–6. ISSN 0033-2437
- Barbara Bojarska (1965), Obozy zniszczenia na terenie powiatu sępoleńskiego w pierwszych miesiącach okupacji hitlerowskiej, Przegląd Zachodni, p. 123. ISSN 0033-2437
- Barbara Bojarska (1965), Obóz w Żabikowie pod Poznaniem, Przegląd Zachodni] XXI/2, pp. 297–306. ISSN 0033-2437
- Barbara Bojarska (1965), Eksterminacja ludności polskiej w powiecie Chełmno nad Wisłą w 1939 roku, Przegląd Zachodni XXI/3, pp. 128–142. ISSN 0033-2437
- Barbara Bojarska (1966), Zbrodnie niemieckie na terenie powiatu Świecie nad Wisłą (1939 r.), Przegląd Zachodni XXII/1-2, pp. 1–2. ISSN 0033-2437
- Barbara Bojarska (1966), Pacyfikacja wsi Wanaty w lutym 1944 roku, Przegląd Zachodni XXII/5-6, p. 5. ISSN 0033-2437
- Barbara Bojarska( 1972), Eksterminacja inteligencji polskiej na Pomorzu Gdańskim (wrzesień- grudzień 1939), Poznań: Instytut Zachodni.
- Barbara Bojarska (2001), Piaśnica - miejsce martyrologii i pamięci: z badań nad zbrodniami hitlerowskimi na Pomorzu, Wejherowo, ISBN 83-914705-0-4.
- Barbara Bojarska (2009), Piaśnica. Miejsce martyrologii i pamięci. Z badań nad zbrodniami hitlerowskimi na Pomorzu, Gdańsk: Wydawnictwo BiT (4th expanded edition).
