= Volksdeutscher Selbstschutz =

Ethnic German paramilitary group in Poland where Germans were a minority

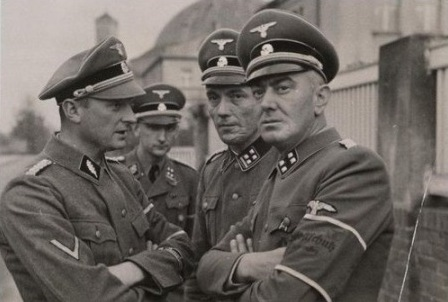
- Selbstschutz leaders in Bydgoszcz at the time of the Bydgoszcz massacres of both Jewish and non-Jewish Poles (from left to right): SS-Standartenführer Ludolf Jakob von Alvensleben; SS-Obersturmbannführer Erich Spaarmann, SS-Obersturmbannführer Hans Kölzow, and SS-Sturmbannführer Christian Schnug
- Country: Poland, Czechoslovakia, Yugoslavia and Soviet Union
- Allegiance: Nazi Germany (SS)
- Type: Paramilitary police reserve

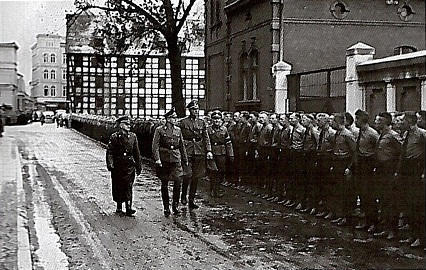
Nazi Mayor of Bromberg Werner Kampe with Josef Meier and Ludolf von Alvensleben, leader of Selbstschutz in Pomerania, during inspection of Volksdeutscher Selbstschutz in 1939

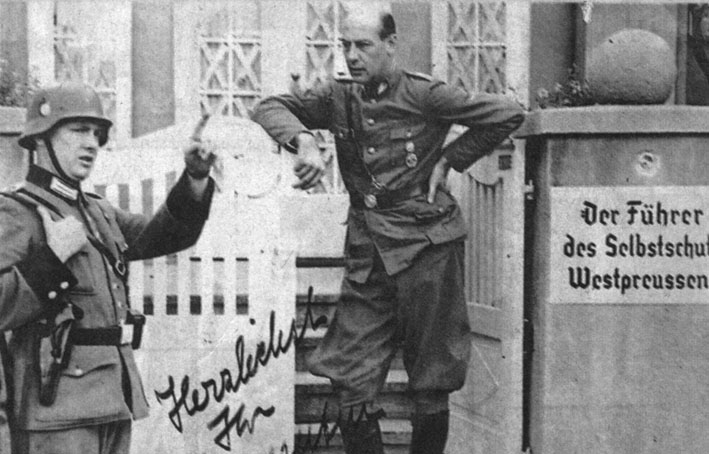
Ludolf von Alvensleben as leader of Volksdeutscher Selbstschutz in West Prussia, 1939

The Volksdeutscher Selbstschutz ('German people's self-defence') was an ethnic-German self-protection militia, a paramilitary organization comprising ethnic Germans (Volksdeutsche) mobilized from among the German minority in Poland.

The Volksdeutscher Selbstschutz operated before, and during the opening stages of, World War II in the western half of Poland and were responsible for, and took part in, massacres of Poles, along with SS Einsatzgruppen.

The Selbstschutz numbered some 100,000 members, who formed the greater part of the German minority "fit for action".

== Background ==
In the interwar period, the German minority organizations in Poland included Jungdeutsche Partei (Young German Party), Deutsche Vereinigung (German Union), Deutscher Volksbund (German Peoples Union) and Deutscher Volksverband (German Peoples Association). All of them formed a fifth column actively cooperating with Nazi Germany in anti-Polish espionage, sabotage, provocations, and political indoctrination. They maintained close contact with and were directed by the NSDAP (Nazi Party), Auslandsorganisation (Foreign Affairs Organization), Gestapo (Secret Police), SD (Security Service) and Abwehr (Defense). Ethnic Germans with Polish citizenship had been trained in the Third Reich in various sabotage methods and guerilla tactics. Before the war began, Selbstschutz activists from Poland compiled lists of Poles who were to be removed or executed in Operation Tannenberg. The list was distributed among Nazi death squads as the Special Prosecution Book-Poland (Sonderfahndungsbuch Polen).

== History ==
Immediately after the invasion of Poland on 1 September 1939, Volksdeutscher Selbstschutz, literally "National German self-protection," engaged in attacks against the Polish population and the army, and performed sabotage operations helping the German advance across the Polish state. In mid-September, the chaotic and largely spontaneous activities of this organization were coordinated by SS officers. Himmler's protégé Gottlob Berger was placed in charge of the organization. While district commanders from the regular army, the Heer, served as occupation authorities in the German-occupied parts of West Prussia, Upper Silesia and what became the Warthegau, the Selbstschutz was organized and directed by the SS and police.

While the SS leadership was limited to overseeing the operations, local units remained under the control of ethnic Germans who had proven their commitment at the beginning of the war. Selbstschutz organized concentration camps for the Poles. They were founded in places where the Wehrmacht and German police units established camps. There were 19 such camps in the following places: Bydgoszcz (Bromberg), Brodnica (Strasburg), Chełmno (Kulm), Dorposz Szlachecki, Kamień Krajeński, Karolewo, Lipno (Lippe), Łobżenica, Nakło (Nakel), Nowy Wiec (near Skarszewy), Nowe (over Vistula), Piastoszyn, Płutowo, Sępólno Krajeńskie, Solec Kujawski (Schulitz), Tuchola (Tuchel), Wąbrzeźno (Briesen), Wolental (near Skórcz), Wyrzysk (Wirsitz). The majority of the Poles imprisoned in those camps (consisting of men, women and youth) were brutally murdered.

== Ethnic cleansing ==
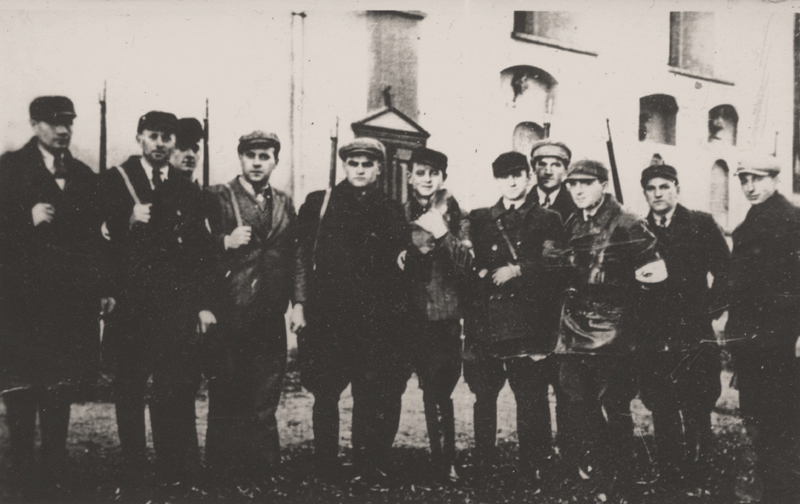
Volksdeutscher Selbstschutz from Łobżenica

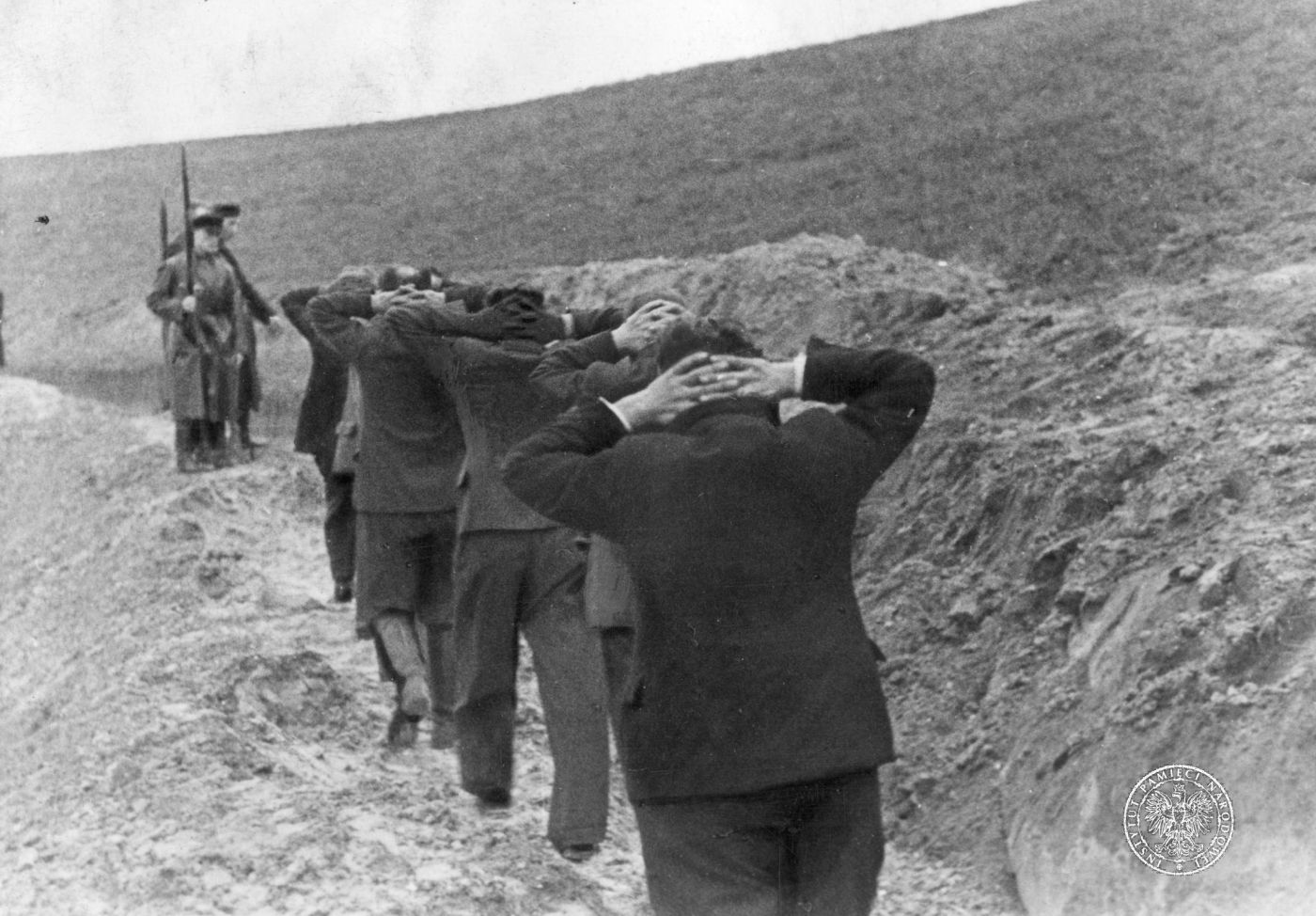
Selbstschutz shooters escorting Polish teachers to the Valley of Death, Bydgoszcz

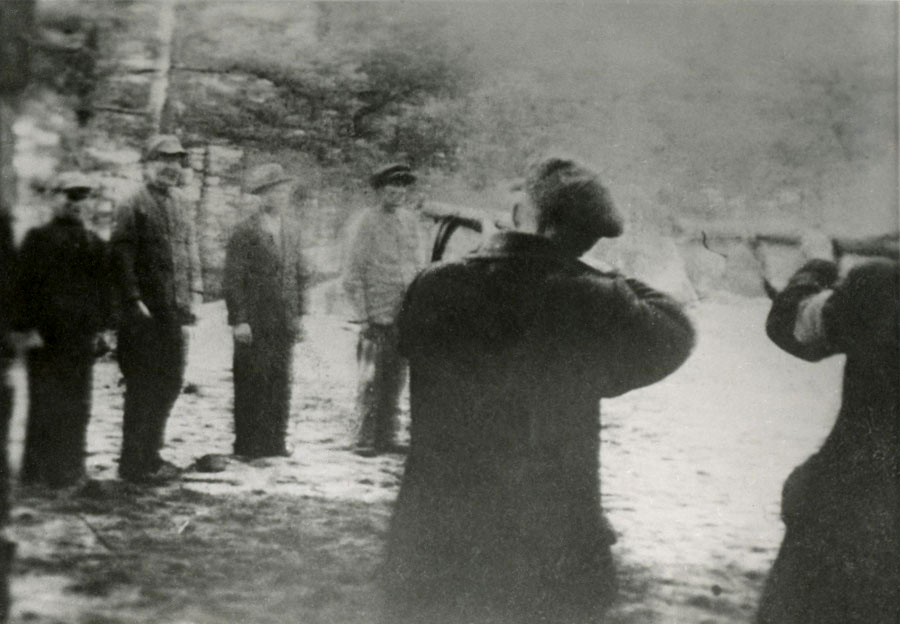
Execution of Polish intelligentsia during the mass murders in Piaśnica

After the German invasion of Poland, the Selbstschutz worked together with the Einsatzgruppen to massacre Poles. Commander of the Selbstschutz Ludolf von Alvensleben told the men on 16 October 1939:

You are now the master race here. Nothing was yet built up through softness and weakness... That’s why I expect, just as our Führer Adolf Hitler expects from you, that you are disciplined, but stand together hard as Krupp steel. Don’t be soft, be merciless, and clear out everything that is not German and could hinder us in the work of construction.

The Selbstschutz took part in the first action of elimination of Polish intelligentsia, the mass murders in Piaśnica, during which 12,000 to 16,000 civilians were murdered. The Intelligenzaktion was a plan to eliminate all Polish intelligentsia and Poland's leadership class in the country. These operations took place soon after the fall of Poland, lasting from the fall of 1939 until the spring of 1940; 60,000 landowners, teachers, entrepreneurs, social workers, army veterans, members of national organizations, priests, judges and political activists were murdered in 10 regional actions. The Intelligenzaktions were continued by Aktion AB in the General Government, the portion of prewar Poland neither incorporated into the Third Reich nor occupied by the Soviets.

By 5 October 1939, in West Prussia alone, the Selbstschutz under the command of Alvensleben was 17,667 men strong, and had already executed 4,247 Poles, while Alvensleben complained to Selbstschutz officers that too few Poles had been shot. (German officers had reported that only a fraction of Poles had been "destroyed" in the region with the total number of those executed in West Prussia during this action being about 20,000. One Selbstschutz commander, Wilhelm Richardt, said in Karolewo (Karlhof) camp that he did not want to build big camps for Poles and feed them, and that it was an honour for Poles to fertilize the German soil with their corpses. There was little opposition to or lack of enthusiasm for the activities of the Selbstschutz among those involved in the action. There was even a case where a Selbstschutz commander was relieved after he failed to account for all the Poles that were required, and it was found that he executed "only" 300 Poles.

== After the conquest of Poland ==
The organization was ordered to be dissolved on 26 November 1939, but the changeover continued until the spring of 1940. Among the reasons were instances of extreme corruption, disorderly behavior and conflicts with other organizations. Members were instructed to join the Schutzstaffel (SS) and Gestapo instead. In the summer of 1940, the new Sonderdienst battalions were formed in place of Selbstschutz and assigned to the head of the civil administration in the new Gau.

It is difficult to estimate the extent and impact of VS activities, as Polish authorities were not able to properly gather evidence once the invasion started, and much of the German documentation related to those activities did not survive the war. The existence of a large paramilitary organization of ethnic Germans with Polish citizenship that engaged in widespread massacres of Poles and helped in the German attack on Poland later served as one of the reasons for the expulsion of Germans after the war. According to German researcher Dieter Schenk, some 1,701 former members of Selbstschutz who committed mass atrocities were identified in postwar Germany. However, there were only 258 cases of judicial investigations, and 233 of them were cancelled. Only 10 Selbstschutz members were ever sentenced by the German courts. This situation was described by Schenk as a "disgrace for the German court system".

== See also ==
- House of Torment
- Execution of Tczew hostages

== Bibliography ==
- Barbara Bojarska: Eksterminacja inteligencji polskiej na Pomorzu Gdańskim (wrzesień-grudzień 1939). Poznań: Instytut Zachodni, 1972.
- Christopher R. Browning: The Origins of the Final Solution: The Evolution of Nazi Jewish Policy, September 1939 – March 1942. University of Nebraska Press. ISBN 0-8032-1327-1.
- Keith Bullivant, Geoffrey Giles: Germany and Eastern Europe: Cultural Identities and Cultural Differences. Rodopi Bv Editions, 1999. ISBN 978-9042006881.
- Christian Jansen, Arno Weckbecker: Der "Volksdeutsche Selbstschutz" in Polen 1939/40. München: R. Oldenbourg, 1992. ISBN 3-486-64564-1.
- Włodzimierz Jastrzębski, Jan Sziling: Okupacja hitlerowska na Pomorzu Gdańskim w latach 1939–1945. Gdańsk: Wydawnictwo Morskie, 1979. ISBN 83-215-71840.
- Tadeusz Jaszowski, Czesław Sobecki: "Niemy świadek". Zbrodnie hitlerowskie w toruńskim Forcie VII i w lesie Barbarka. Bydgoszcz: Kujawsko-Pomorskie Towarzystwo Kulturalne, 1971.
- Georges Jerome : Les milices d'autoprotection de la communauté allemande de Pomérélie, Posnanie et Silésie polonaise 1939 - 1940. Revue Guerres Mondiales et Conflits contemporains n° 163 juillet 1991.
- Paweł Kosiński, Barbara Polak. Nie zamierzam podejmować żadnej polemiki – wywiad z prof. Witoldem Kuleszą. "Biuletyn IPN". 12-1 (35-36), grudzień – styczeń 2003–2004.
- Roman Kozłowski (1992): Mniszek – miejsce kaźni. Dragacz: Gminny Komitet Ochrony Pomników Walki i Męczeństwa.
- Mirosław Krajewski: W cieniu wojny i okupacji. Ziemia Dobrzyńska w latach 1939–1945. Rypin: Dobrzyński Oddział Włocławskiego Towarzystwa Naukowego w Rypinie, 1995. OCLC 750495343.
- Stanisław Nawrocki: Policja hitlerowska w tzw. Kraju Warty 1939–1945. Poznań: Instytut Zachodni, 1970.
- Dieter Schenk: Albert Forster. Gdański namiestnik Hitlera. Gdańsk: Wydawnictwo Oskar, 2002. ISBN 83-86181-83-4.
- Piotr Semków. Martyrologia Polaków z Pomorza Gdańskiego w latach II wojny światowej. "Biuletyn IPN". 8 – 9 (67 – 68), sierpień-wrzesień 2006.
- Irena Sroka: Policja Hitlerowska w rejencji katowickiej w latach 1939–1945. Opole: Instytut Śląski, 1997.
