= Dieter Schenk =

German author, former police officer, and human rights activist

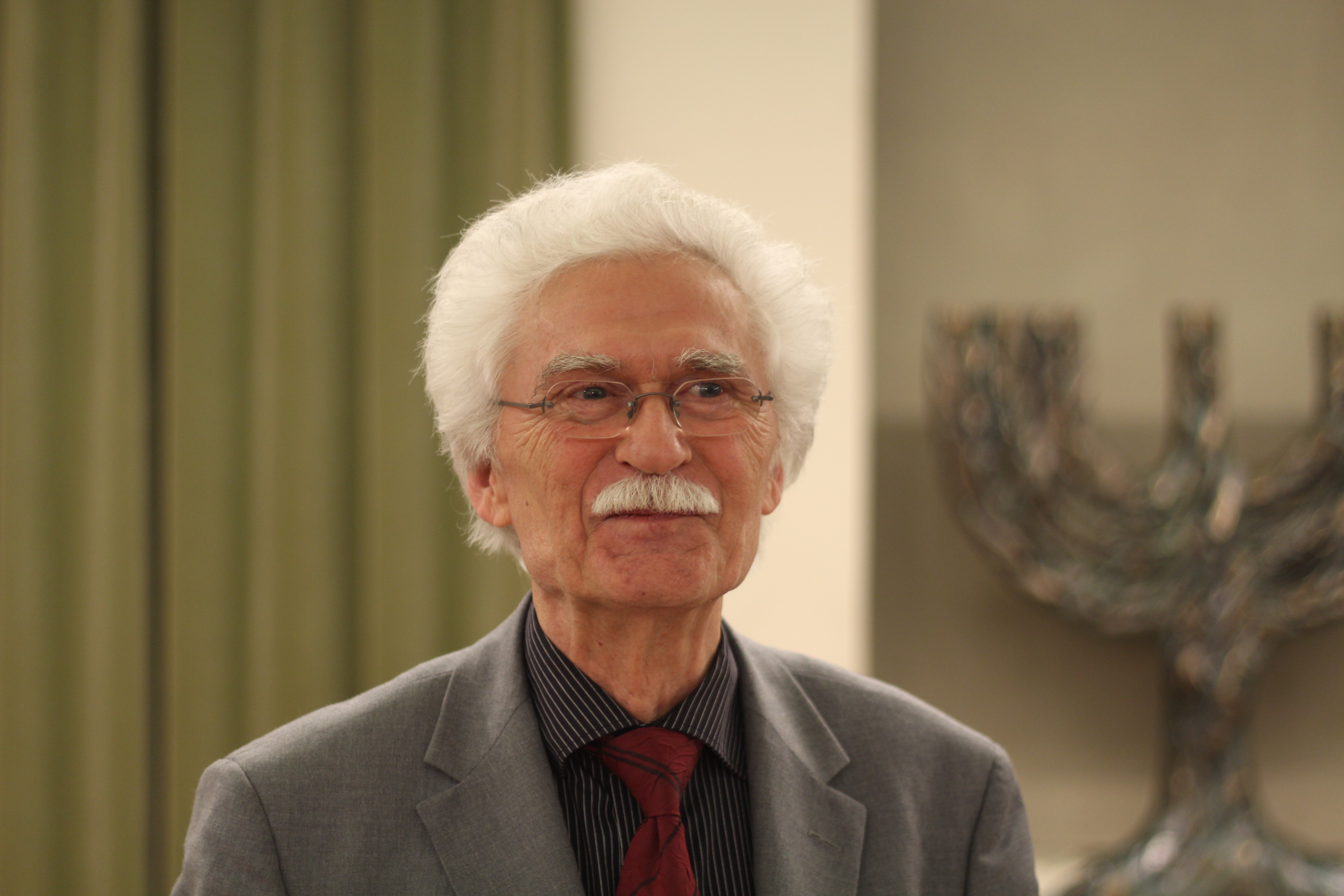
- Born: March 14, 1937 (age 88); Frankfurt am Main
- Citizenship: German
- Occupation(s): Criminologist author

Dieter Schenk (born March 14, 1937) is a German author, former high police officer of the Bundeskriminalamt, and a member of Amnesty International. He is best known for his work and activism which led the German court in Lübeck to overturn a 1939 verdict from World War II, regarding the defenders of the Polish Post Office in Danzig (Gdańsk), as well as his books on the widespread influence of ex-Nazis in post World War II Federal Criminal Police Office (BKA).

Schenk is a former Kriminaldirektor of Federal Criminal Police Office (Bundeskriminalamt), located in Wiesbaden, where he was the agency's contact with Interpol. He left the agency in 1989 because of what he describes as "the ignorance of the BKA concerning the violation of human rights in torturing regimes".

== Work on the defense of Gdańsk post office ==
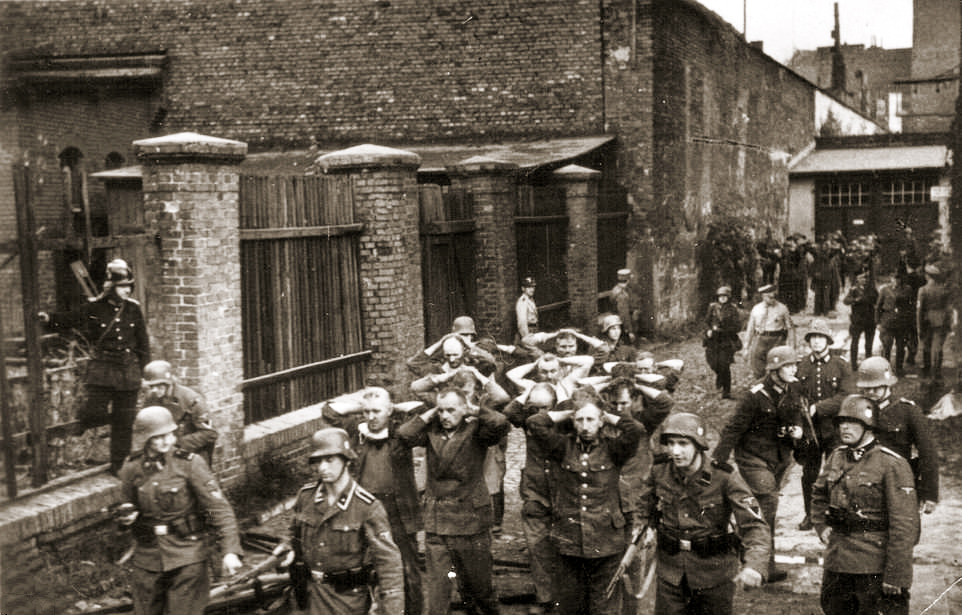
Captured defenders of the Polish Post Office in Danzig, 1939.

During the Nazi invasion of Poland, the Germans also carried out attacks on Polish controlled building in the Free City of Danzig (Wolne Miasto Gdańsk), including the post office, which constituted extraterritorial Polish property. The Polish defense of the building, carried out by 55 lightly armed postmen against more than 200 German SS (Schutzstaffel), SA (Sturmabteilung) and police troops, lasted for 15 hours. The Poles surrendered after the German forces used automatic pumps, gasoline tanks and flamethrowers to set the building on fire. Polish casualties were 6 killed during the fighting and 2 more killed while they were trying to surrender with a white flag. Four of the defenders managed to escape and six died in a Gestapo hospital. The rest were imprisoned, tortured, tried (with a single Wehrmacht officer as defense lawyer) by a Wehrmacht court-martial and sentenced to death. 28 of the judgements were countersigned, and thus became legally valid, by General Hans Günther von Kluge, another 10 by Colonel Eduard Wagner A clemency appeal was rejected by Walther von Brauchitsch (who was to be charged after the war with crimes against humanity, but died while in custody) and carried out on September 8 and 30.

Schenk began researching the events in 1993 and published a book, Die Post von Danzig: Geschichte eines deutschen Justizmords ("The Post Office of Gdańsk: History of a German judicial murder"), which led to the revision of the verdict. He figured out that the German forces were Danzig police-, SS- and SA-men, commanded by a Danzig police officer, and only at a subsequent stage regular Wehrmacht forces did take part in the fighting. Thus a Wehrmacht court martial was not competent to convict the defenders. Instead, the Free City of Danzig's penal law would have been applicable, without the alternative of a death penalty. As a result, the judgements were nullified and the Polish defenders were "rehabilitated" by the Lübeck court. A symbolic reparation was made to the victims' families. On their initiative, Schenk was declared an honorary citizen of Gdańsk in 2003.

== Honors and awards ==
Schenk is also an honorary professor of University of Łódź where he has taught classes as a lecturer, and a recipient of the Fritz Bauer Prize from the Humanist Union (2003), named after Fritz Bauer the German prosecutor and judge who strove to obtain justice and compensation for victims of the Nazi regime, and contributed to the capture of Adolf Eichmann in Argentina.

He is a founding member of the task group Amnesty International Police Working Group, Germany (Sektionsarbeitsgruppe Polizei bei Amnesty International).

== Other works ==
Dieter Schenk has also published books on the Nazi Gauleiter of Danzig-West Prussia, Albert Forster, Hitlers Mann in Danzig ("Hitler's man in Gdańsk"). In this book, Schenk documented that even after the end of the Intelligenzaktion in Pomerania (an organized Nazi action aimed at the elimination of the Polish intelligentsia in Pomerania during which the Germans executed between 36,000 and 42,000 Poles and Jews in the region), the Gestapo continued to carry out judicial murders (Justizmord).

His other books include Krakauer Burg: Die Machtzentrale des Generalgouverneurs Hans Frank 1939-1945 ("Krakow's Castle: The power center of the Governor General Hans Frank 1939-1945") (2010) about the Governor-General of Nazi-occupied portion of Poland called General Government, Hans Frank, Die braunen Wurzeln des BKA ("The Brown roots of the BKA") (2001), which deals with the extensive influence that ex-Nazis held in post-war German Federal criminal police, Der Lemberger Professorenmord und der Holocaust in Ostgalizien ("The Murder of Lwow professors and the Holocaust in East Galicia") (2007) and BKA - Polizeihilfe für Folterregime ("BKA - Police assistance to torture regimes") (2008).
