= Intelligenzaktion Pommern =

1939–1940 massacres in Pomerania committed by Nazi Germany

- Part of Generalplan Ost
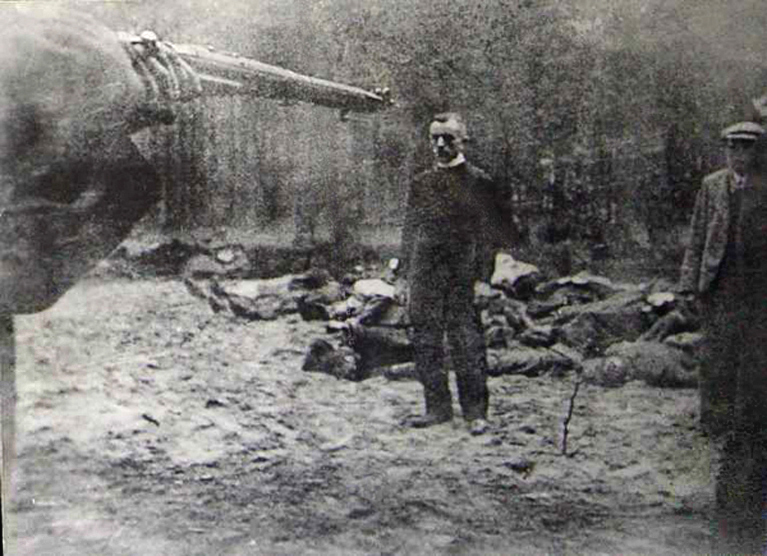
- Mass shootings in Darzlubska Wilderness

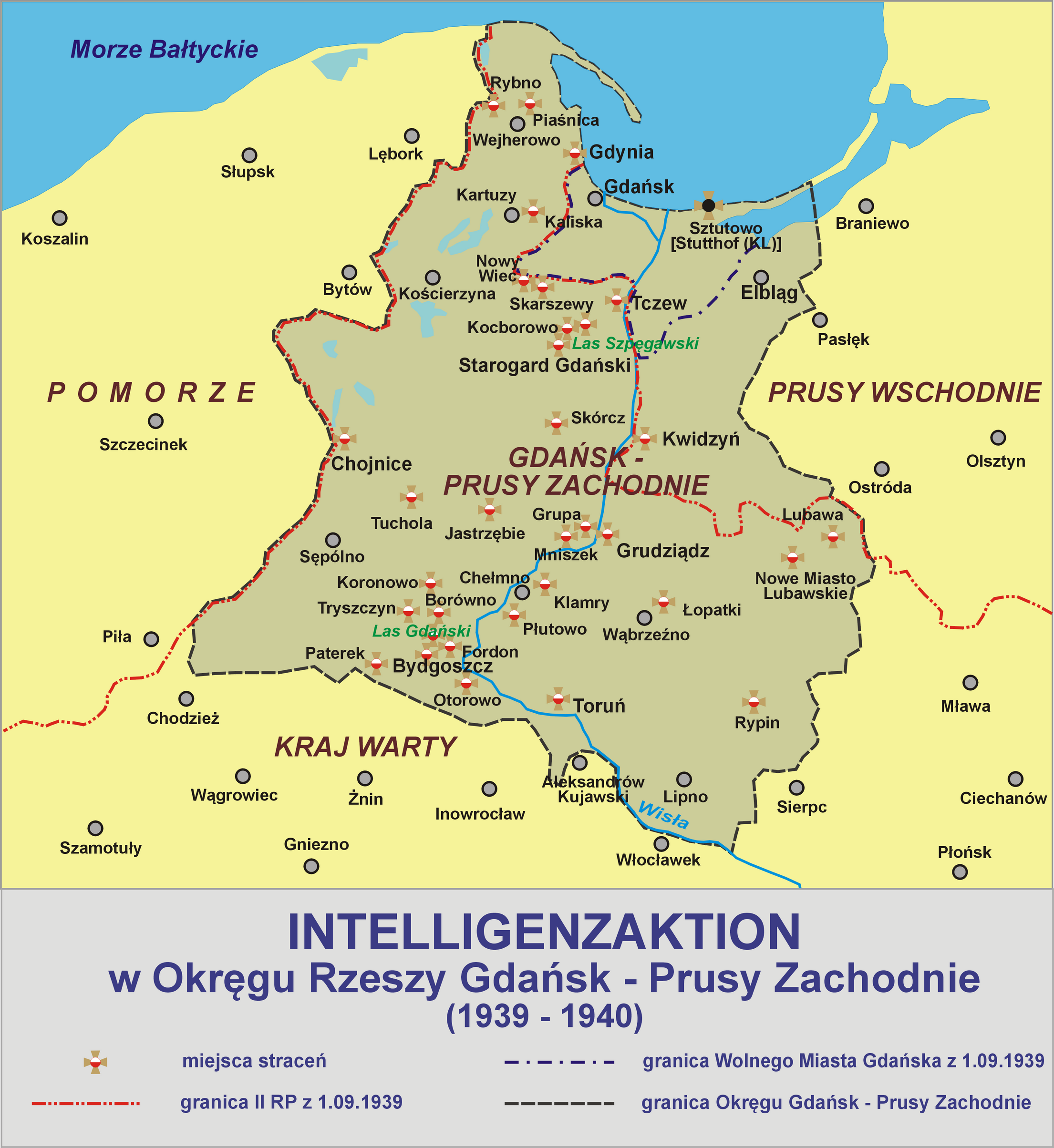
- Pomerania: places of executions marked in red
- Location: German occupied Pomeranian Voivodeship, Free City of Danzig annexed as Reichsgau Danzig-West Prussia in Polish areas annexed by Nazi Germany
- Date: 1939–1940
- Target: Polish intellectuals and the upper classes from prescribed list.
- Attack type: Massacres
- Weapon: Automatic weapons
- Deaths: 23,000
- Perpetrators: Nazi Germany, SS-armed militia from German minority in Poland
- Motive: Anti-Polish sentiment, Antisemitism, Anti-slavism

The Intelligenzaktion Pommern was a Nazi German operation aimed at the eradication of the Polish intelligentsia in Pomeranian Voivodeship and the surrounding areas at the beginning of World War II. It was part of a larger genocidal Intelligenzaktion that took place across most of Nazi-occupied western Poland in the course of Operation Tannenberg (Unternehmen Tannenberg), purposed to install Nazi officials from SiPo, Kripo, Gestapo and SD at the helm of a new administrative machine.

On the direct orders from Adolf Hitler, carried out by Reinhard Heydrich's bureau of Referat Tannenberg along with Heinrich Himmler’s established Reich Security Main Office (RSHA), Poles from among intelligentsia and elites were rounded up, and executed without any due process by the SS-Einsatzgruppen in dozens of remote locations such as the forest massacres in Piaśnica and the cavernous Valley of Death. Starting right after the invasion in September 1939, with a second wave in the spring of 1940, these actions were an early measure of the German Generalplan Ost colonization.

== Background ==
After the Nazi invasion of Poland, the ethnically Polish and Kashubian population of Polish Pomerania was immediately subjected to brutal terror. Poles were seen by German state during the war as subhuman. Prisoners of war, as well as many Polish intellectuals and community leaders were murdered. Many of the crimes were carried out, with official approval, by the so-called Einsatzkommando 16 and "Selbstschutz", or paramilitary organizations of ethnic Germans with previously Polish citizenship. They in turn were encouraged to participate in the violence and pogroms by the local Gauleiter Albert Forster, who in a speech at the Prusinski Hotel in Wejherowo agitated ethnic Germans to attack Poles by saying "We have to eliminate the lice ridden Poles, starting with those in the cradle... in your hands I give the fate of the Poles, you can do with them what you want". The crowd gathered before the hotel chanted "Kill the Polish dogs!" and "Death to the Poles". The Selbstschutz participated in the early massacres as Piaśnica, and many of their members later joined police and SS formations which continued the massacres until the Fall of 1940.

Organized action aimed at exterminating the Polish population of the region, however, began only after the end of the September campaign, with the Intelligenzaktion Pommern, a part of an overall Intelligenzaktion by Nazi Germany aimed at liquidating the Polish elite. Its main targets were the Polish intelligentsia, which was blamed by the Nazis for pro-Polish policies in the Polish corridor during the interwar period. Educated Poles were also perceived by the Nazis as the main obstacle to the planned complete Germanization of the region.

== Prepared list of targets ==
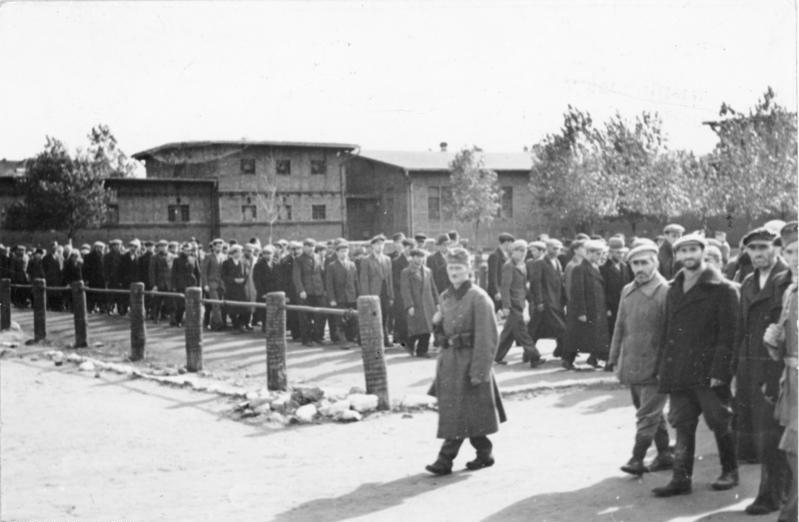
Poles and Jews interned in Bydgoszcz

Even before the Nazi invasion of Poland, German police and Gestapo cooperated with the German minority in Poland to prepare special lists of Poles "Sonderfahndungsbuch Polen" whom they regarded as representative of the Polish government, administration, culture, and life in the region. People on this list were called "The enemies of Reich" and were designated to be executed. According to official criteria, the Polish "intelligentsia" included anyone with a middle school or higher education, priests, teachers, doctors, dentists, veterinarians, veteran military officers, bureaucrats, members of Polish administration, police, medium and large businessmen and merchants, medium and large landowners, writers, journalists and newspaper editors. Furthermore, all persons who during the interwar period had belonged to many Polish cultural and patriotic organizations such as Polski Związek Zachodni or Polish Union of the West, Związek Obrony Kresów Zachodnich, Polish Gymnastic Society "Falcon" and Maritime and Colonial League.

Between the fall of 1939 and spring of 1940, in the Intelligenzaktion and other actions, the Nazis killed around 100,000 Polish intellectuals and other prominent citizens, 61,000 of whom came from special lists. The main site of these murders were the forests around Wielka Piasnica.

== Method of realisation ==
The action was realised by SS paramilitary death squads – Einsatzcommando 16 and the paramilitary organisation of the German minority in Poland – Volksdeutscher Selbstschutz. The aim of this action was elimination of Polish society elite: Polish nobles, intelligentsia, teachers, Polish entrepreneurs, social workers, military veterans, members of national organisations, priests, judges and political activists.

=== Locations ===
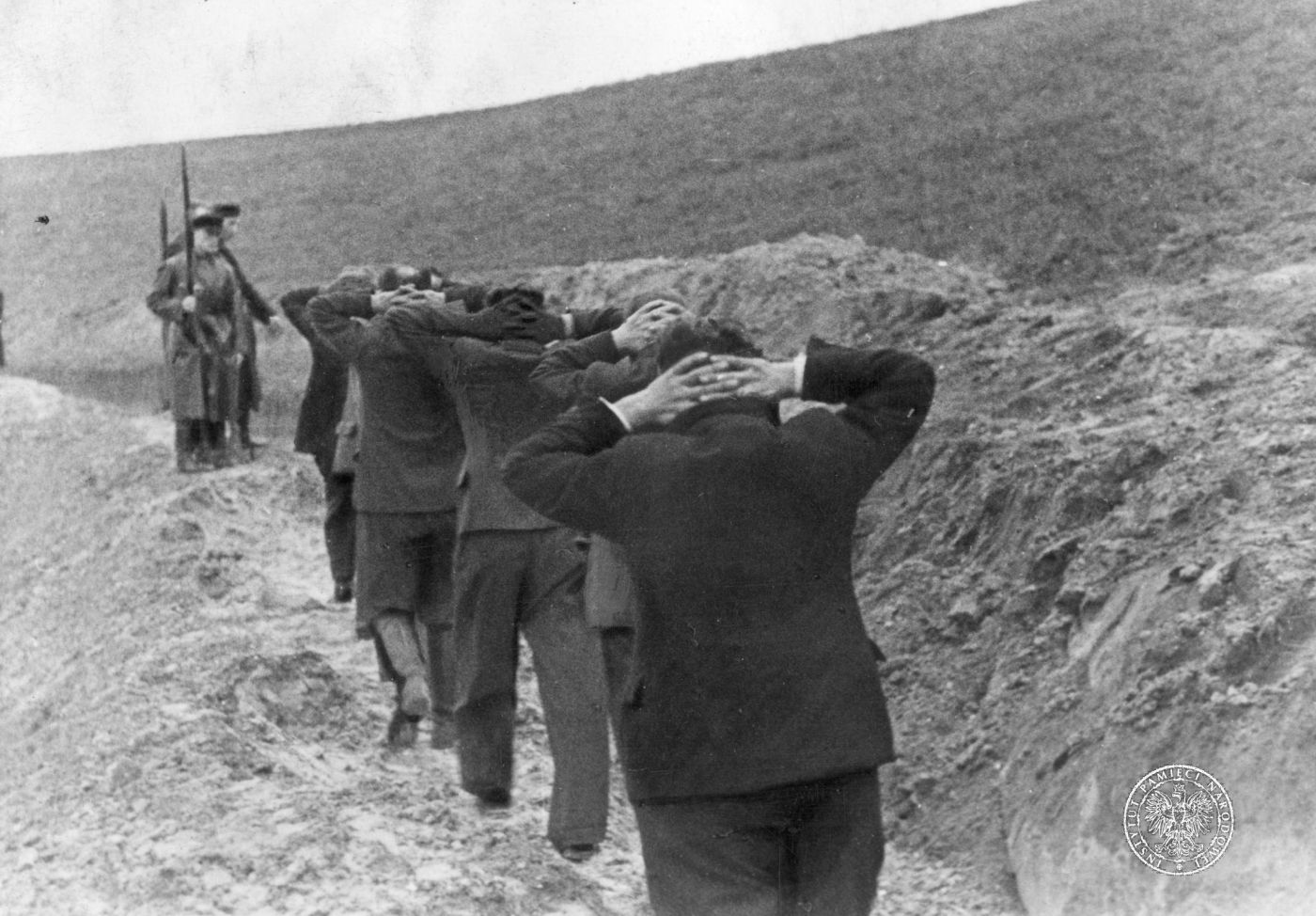
Polish teachers from Bydgoszcz guarded by members of Volksdeutscher Selbstschutz before execution

Most executions of this regional action took place in forests near Piaśnica Wielka, Mniszek near Świecie and in the Szpęgawski forests near Starogard Gdański. Local Germans (Selbstschutz) and the Gestapo murdered 5,000–6,600 Poles and Jews in October and November 1939 in Fordon, Bydgoszcz, northern Poland in a place known as the "Fordon Valley of Death" (Polish: fordońska Dolina Śmierci). In a similar mass murder near Chojnice, known as "Chojnice Valley of Death" (Polish: Chojnicka Dolina Śmierci), 2,000 citizens from Chojnice were murdered between 1939 and 1945. Most victims were Polish intelligentsia and patients from local mental hospitals murdered in the "Euthanasia Program" called Action T4.

== German SS units ==
Those who participated in the mass murder in Piaśnica included:

- Einsatzkommando 16, under command of head Danzig Gestapo, Rudolf Tröger
- special unit of the SS – 36 Regiment SS Wachsturmbann ˝Eimann˝ under command of Kurt Eimann
- members of local Selbstschutz

Mass murder in Szpęgawski Forest

- special unit of the SS – 36 Regiment SS Wachsturmbann ˝Eimann˝ under command of Kurt Eimann
- members of Selbstschutz from Starogard Gdański under command of SS-Unterscharführer Paul Drews
- 12 members of SS Heimwehr Danzig under command of SS-Obersturmführer Wilhelm Fast

Mass murder in Mniszek

- special unit of the SS – 36 Regiment SS Wachsturmbann ˝Eimann˝, under command of Kurt Eimann
- members of local Selbstschutz

== See also ==
- Sonderaktion Krakau
- German AB Action operation in Poland
- Massacre of Lwów professors

== Notes and references ==
- "Mass murder in Piaśnica in 1939" article (in Polish)

== Bibliography ==
- Elżbieta Grot, Ludobójstwo w Piaśnicy z uwzględnieniem losów mieszkańców powiatu wejherowskiego (Genocide in Piaśnica with addition of the fate of the inhabitants of Wejherowo county). Public Library of Wejherowo. "Biblioteka Publiczna Gminy Wejherowo im. Aleksandra Labudy w Bolszewie". Bpgw.org.pl. 10 February 2009. Archived from the original on 9 February 2010.
- Maria Wardzyńska, Był rok 1939 Operacja niemieckiej policji bezpieczeństwa w Polsce. Intelligenzaktion, IPN Instytut Pamięci Narodowej, 2009 ISBN 978-83-7629-063-8
- Tadeusz Piotrowski (1998). Poland's Holocaust: Ethnic Strife, Collaboration with Occupying Forces and Genocide in the Second Republic, 1918–1947. McFarland. p. 25. ISBN 978-0-7864-0371-4.
- Maria Wardzyńska: Intelligenzaktion" na Warmii, Mazurach oraz Północnym Mazowszu. Główna Komisja Ścigania Zbrodni Przeciwko Narodowi Polskiemu. Biuletyn Instytutu Pamięci Narodowej nr. 12/1, 2003/2004, ss. 38–42. "W oparciu o Dokumenty Google".
- Andrzej Szcześniak: Generalplan Ost. Plan Zagłady Słowian. Radom: Polskie Wydawnictwo Encyklopedyczne, 2001, ISBN 978-83-88822-03-2.
- Dieter Schenk "Hitlers Mann in Danzig Gauleiter Forster und die NS-Verbrechen in Danzig-Westpreußen", J. H. W. Dietz Nachf. Verlag, Bonn 2000, ISBN 3-8012-5029-6, ISBN 978-3-8012-5029-4
- Meier, Anna "Die Intelligenzaktion: Die Vernichtung der polnischen Oberschicht im Gau Danzig-Westpreußen" VDM Verlag Dr. Müller, ISBN 978-3-639-04721-9 ISBN 978-3-639-04721-9
