= Borówno =

Borówno may refer to the following places in Poland:

- Borówno, Lower Silesian Voivodeship (south-west Poland)
- Borówno, Bydgoszcz County in Kuyavian-Pomeranian Voivodeship (north-central Poland)
- Borówno, Chełmno County in Kuyavian-Pomeranian Voivodeship (north-central Poland)
- Borówno, Golub-Dobrzyń County in Kuyavian-Pomeranian Voivodeship (north-central Poland)
- Borówno, Warmian-Masurian Voivodeship (north Poland)
- Borówno, West Pomeranian Voivodeship (north-west Poland)
- Borówno Lake in Kuyavian-Pomeranian Voivodeship
