= German repressions against the people of Bydgoszcz =

1939 targeted killings of Poles and Jews by Germany

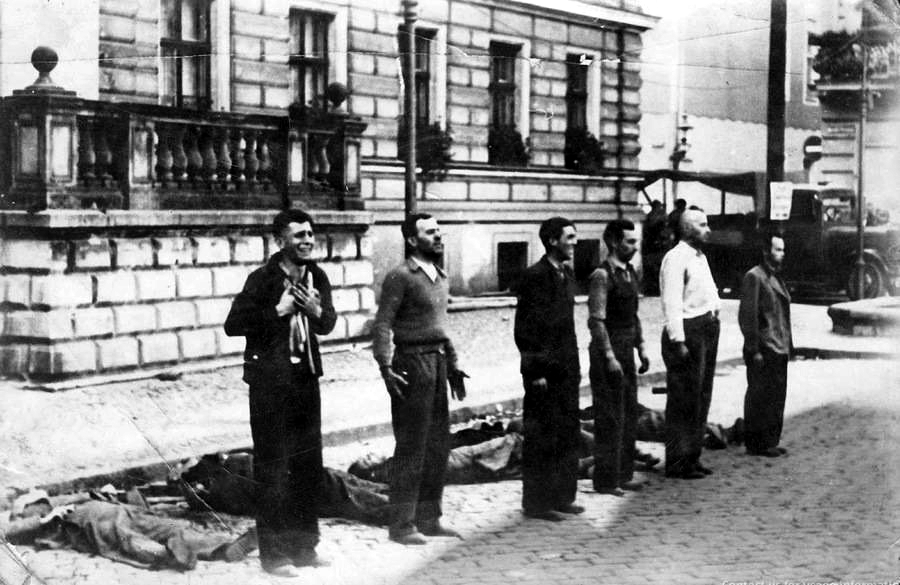
- Polish hostages moments before execution Old Market Square in Bydgoszcz, 9 September 1939
- Location: 53°07′30″N 18°00′40″E; Bydgoszcz, Poland (occupied by Nazi Germany – Reichsgau Danzig-West Prussia)
- Date: September–November 1939
- Attack type: execution by firing squad
- Deaths: 5000 people
- Perpetrators: Wehrmacht; Einsatzgruppen; Volksdeutscher Selbstschutz
- Motive: Reprisal

Between September and December 1939, Nazi German occupiers in Poland instigated a series of mass executions against the civilian population of Bydgoszcz, targeting those of Polish and Jewish origin.

Mass arrests and executions of Bydgoszcz residents, carried out primarily by Wehrmacht soldiers and Einsatzgruppen officers, initially took place in an atmosphere of chaos and were a retaliation for the events of the so-called "Bloody Sunday" in Bydgoszcz (3–4 September 1939) and for the resistance offered by the local Civic Guard to the advancing Wehrmacht units. The ad hoc reprisals later turned into an organized extermination campaign, aimed at the liquidation of the Polish political and intellectual elite in Bydgoszcz, with the main executor being the paramilitary Selbstschutz. During the first four months of the occupation, the Germans murdered up to 5000 residents of Bydgoszcz and the Bydgoszcz County in secret or public executions, of which probably between 1500 and 1900 victims were from Bydgoszcz itself.

== Origins ==
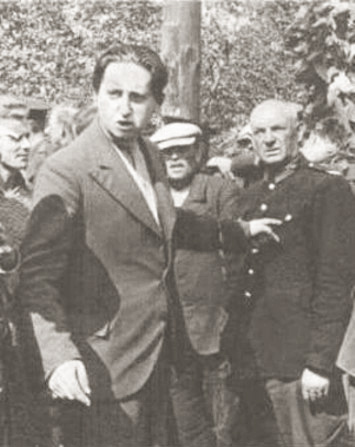
Volksdeutsch denouncing a Pole – alleged participant in "Bloody Sunday"

In the first months of the German occupation, Pomerania was the region of Poland where Nazi terror took the most brutal form. Polish historians estimate that between September 1939 and spring 1940, the occupiers murdered between 36,000 and 50,000 Poles and Jews in Pomerania. Meanwhile, German historian Dieter Schenk calculated that between 1939 and 1945, the Nazis murdered between 52,794 and 60,750 people in direct executions in these areas. With the exception of a few hundred, almost all of these individuals lost their lives in the first months after the German troops entered. Even against this backdrop, German retribution against the people of Bydgoszcz took on exceptional proportions, making the city one of the symbols of German atrocities committed in occupied Poland. The human losses suffered by the population of Bydgoszcz during World War II are currently estimated at 10,000.

Several reasons can be distinguished for why German terror took such a brutal form in Bydgoszcz. The Nazis found their propagandistic justification for dealing with the people of Bydgoszcz primarily in the events of the so-called "Bloody Sunday" in Bydgoszcz (German: Bromberger Blutsonntag) on 3–4 September 1939. In Polish historiography, these events are described as the bloody suppression by the Polish military of a German diversionary action in the city, while in German historiography, they are portrayed as a pogrom against local Volksdeutsche. Goebbels' propaganda made great efforts to portray the events in Bydgoszcz in a stirring manner and to provide a propagandistic justification for the German policy of extermination conducted in Polish territories (especially in Pomerania).

In the first days of the occupation, German reprisals were also provoked by the resistance offered by the local Civic Guard to the advancing Wehrmacht units, which the Germans, in violation of international humanitarian law, regarded as a guerrilla formation. Later, both of these events became a pretext for the occupiers to carry out the extermination of the Polish political and intellectual elite in Bydgoszcz, as well as to deal with the Jewish population. The reprisals in Bydgoszcz were part of a broader extermination campaign carried out throughout Pomerania as part of the so-called Intelligenzaktion.

In German repression policy aimed at the population of Bydgoszcz, Professor Włodzimierz Jastrzębski distinguished three phases:

- From September 5 to 12, 1939 – reprisals were carried out by Wehrmacht soldiers and Einsatzgruppen officers to pacify the city and suppress the alleged "Polish uprising in Bydgoszcz". Many executions were carried out in public places.
- Until the end of November 1939 – Sicherheitspolizei and Selbstschutz organized secret mass executions in remote locations near Bydgoszcz.
- From December 1939 – a kind of "normalization" occurred. Mass killings were abandoned, and Poles were subjected to terror organized by the Nazi police and judicial system.

== Crimes committed in the first days of the occupation ==
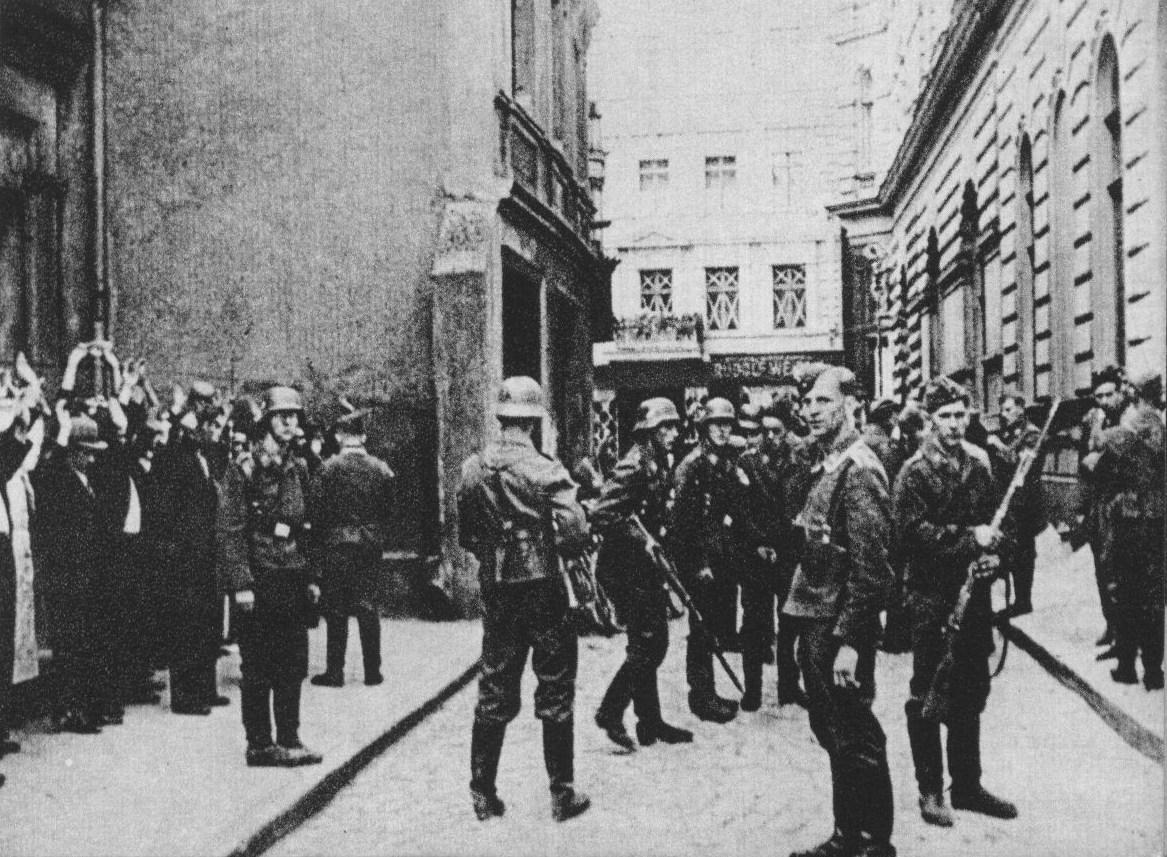
Roundup on Parkowa Street (September 8th)

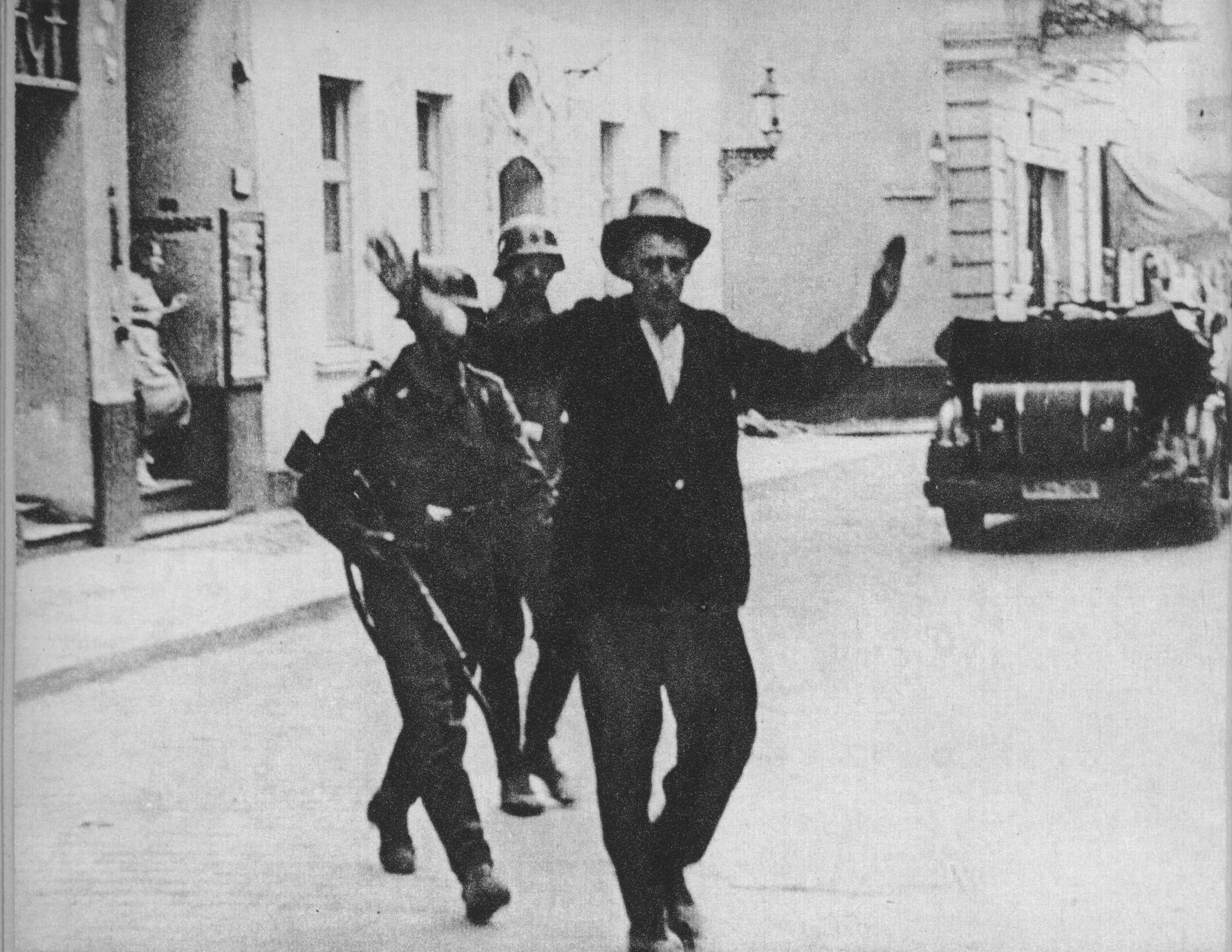
Unknown by name resident of Bydgoszcz driven down Farna Street

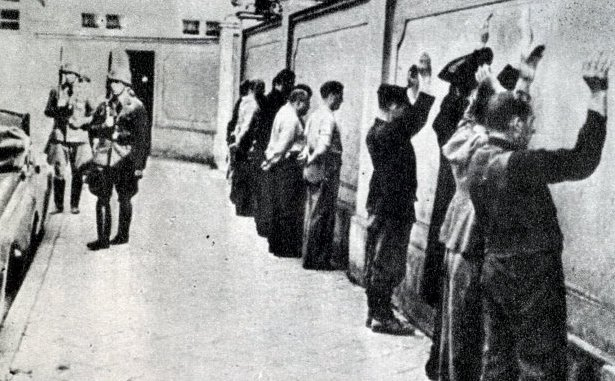
Detained civilians at the wall of the prison on Wały Jagiellońskie Street

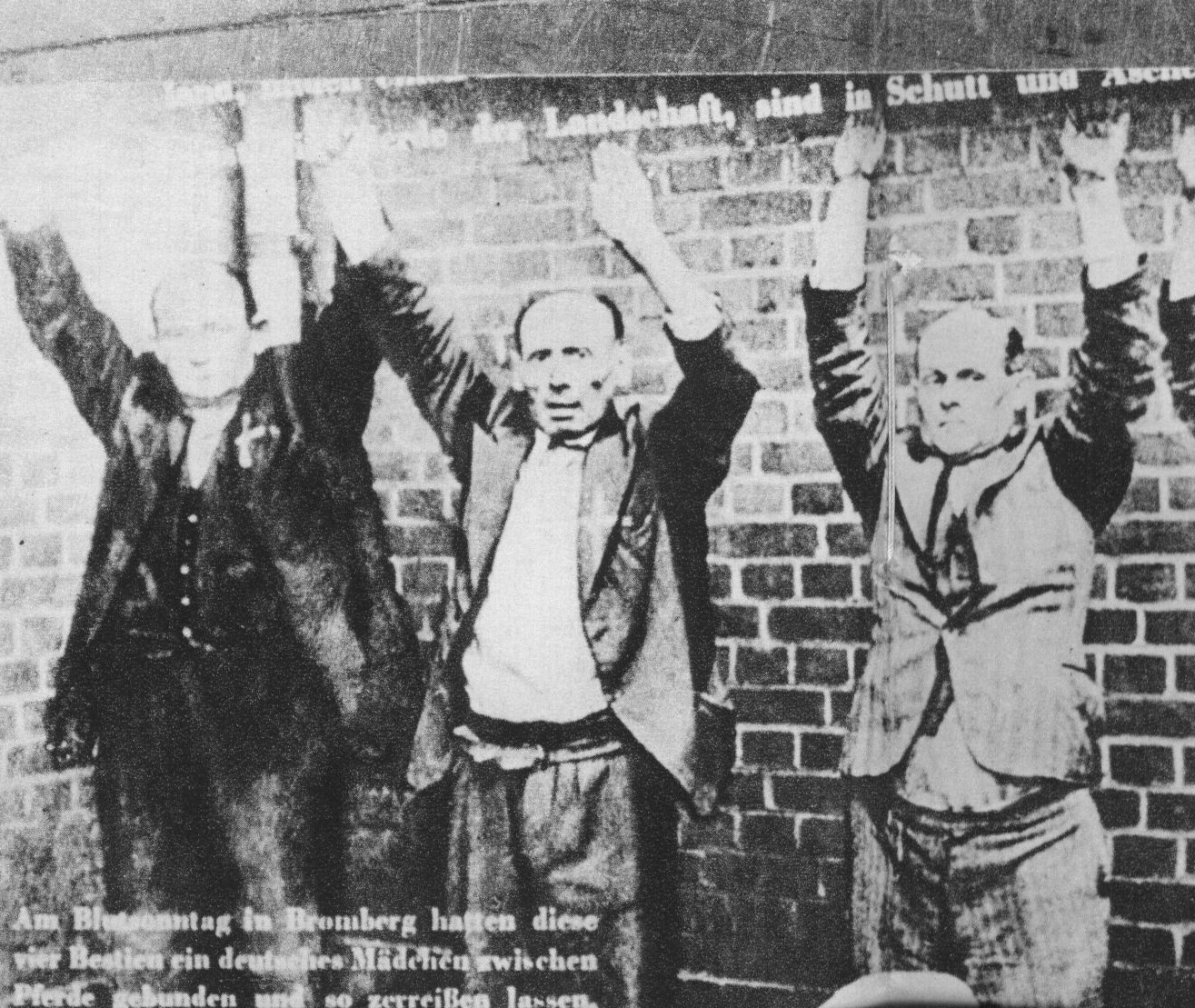
Arrested Poles. The sign of the cross on the jackets indicates that, as persons designated by the local Volksdeutsche, these men were sentenced to death

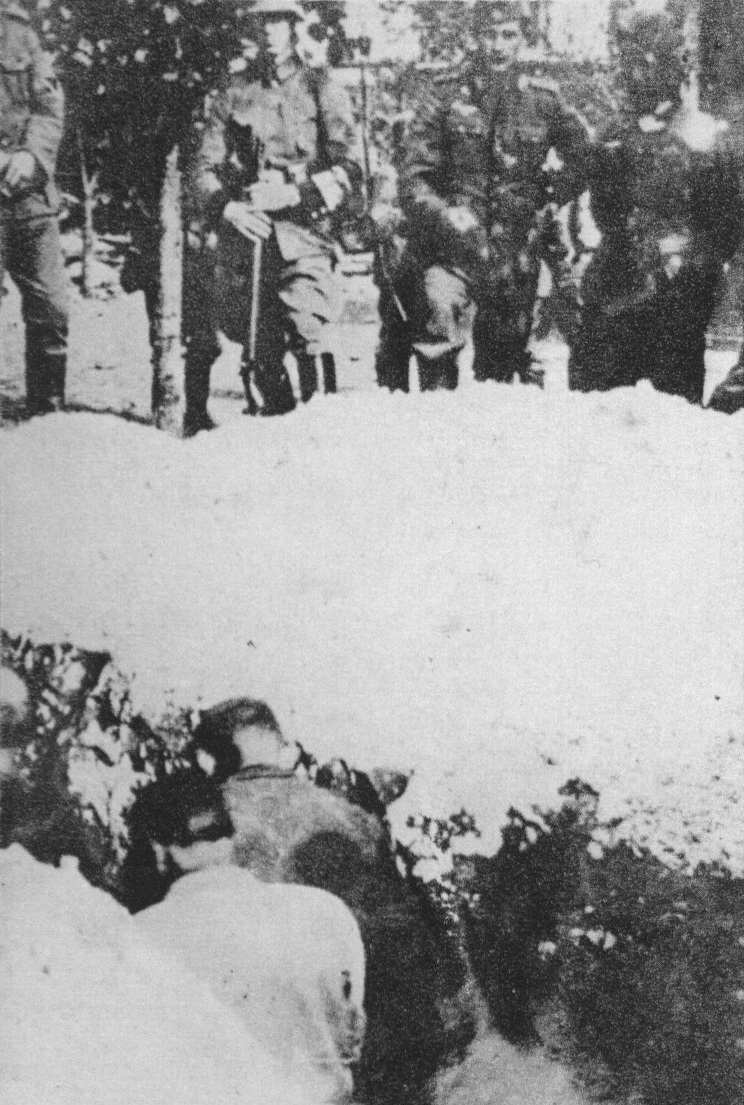
One of the first mass executions in Bydgoszcz

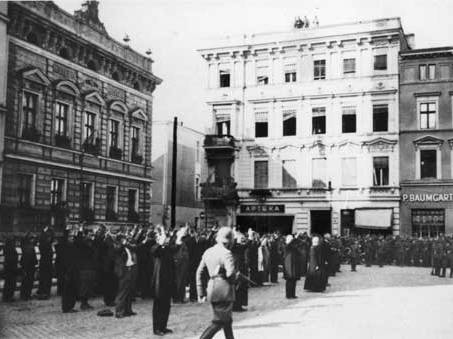
Hostages at the Old Market Square in Bydgoszcz

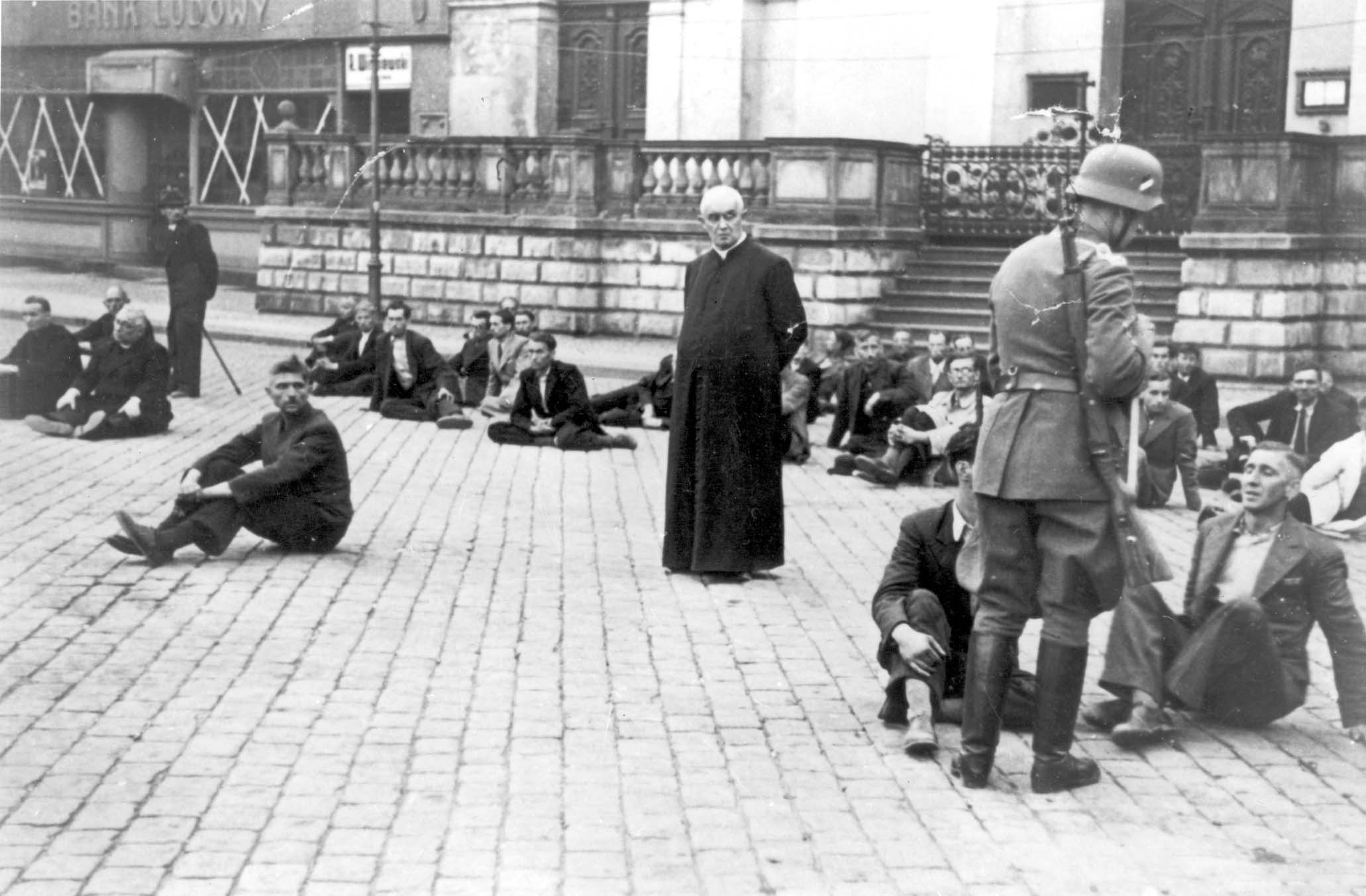
Polish priest – one of the hostages awaiting execution

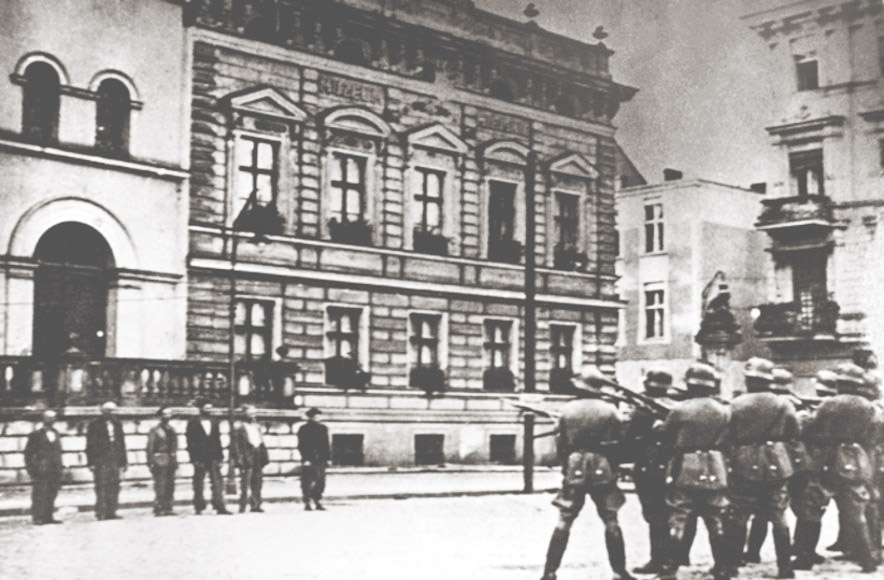
Public execution of hostages in the Old Market Square (September 9th)

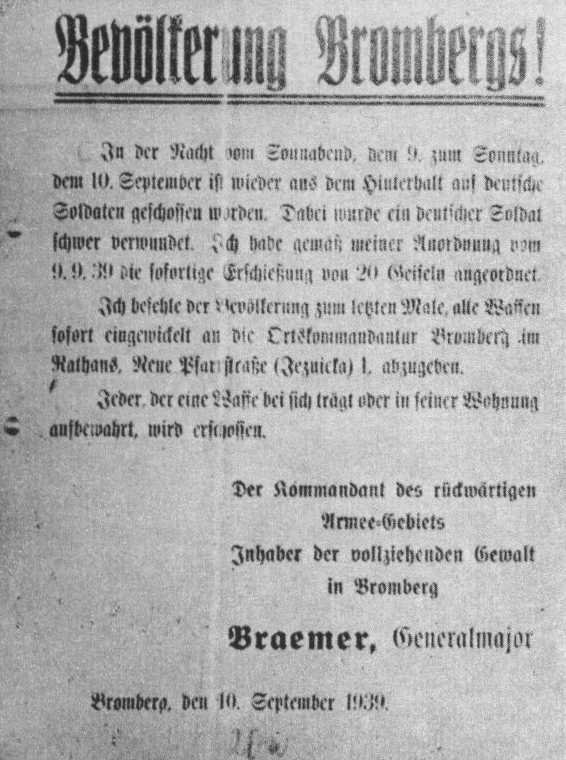
Announcement signed by General Walter Braemer, informing of the execution of 20 hostages on 9 September 1939

The Wehrmacht units entered Bydgoszcz on Tuesday, 5 September 1939. On the same day, a detachment of the Schutzstaffel (Einsatzkommando 1/IV) led by SS-Sturmbannführer Helmut Bischoff also appeared in the city. Bischoff's unit was part of Einsatzgruppe IV (commanded by SS-Brigadeführer Lothar Beutel) – a special operational group (Einsatzgruppen) of the security police and Sicherheitsdienst, following in the wake of the units of the German 4th Army.

At that time, the regular Polish army soldiers had already withdrawn from Bydgoszcz. However, the Germans encountered fierce resistance from members of the Bydgoszcz Civic Guard. Particularly intense fighting broke out in the working-class district of Szwederowo, where railway workers belonging to the Railway Military Training under the command of Franciszek Marchlewski were active. Two German soldiers were killed in the fighting, and a major officer was captured. The Bydgoszcz Civic Guard only surrendered their weapons after receiving assurance from General Eccard von Gablenz (commander of the "Netze" battle group) that their rights, as due to regular troops, would be respected. (Note: According to the Fourth Hague Convention, members of irregular troops wearing distinctive insignia and using weapons openly are considered members of regular troops and are subject to the protection of the convention.) However, the Germans did not keep their promises. The captured members of the Civic Guard were handed over to the officers of Einsatzgruppe IV. Some prisoners (about 40 in number) were beaten to death with metal rods by Schutzstaffel men. (Note: Helmut Bischoff later recorded in his account: "These criminals had already been beaten severely by our extremely bitter soldiers and police officials, in part, on the way when escorting them to the city hall. After all, they deserved nothing else" (Böhler (2009, p. 147)).) The rest, including both leaders of the Civic Guard – Konrad Fiedler and Marian Maczuga – were shot on the Bielawki hills in Bydgoszcz.

In the first few days after the Germans occupied the city, chaos prevailed in Bydgoszcz. Concurrently with taking control of various districts of Bydgoszcz, the occupiers carried out mass arrests of civilians. The victims were primarily workers, railway employees, small craftsmen, lower-ranking officials, and high school students – as members of the Civic Guard mainly came from these social groups. In the ad hoc executions carried out by Einsatzgruppe IV and the Wehrmacht (especially soldiers from the 1st Signal Regiment), hundreds of residents of the city were killed. General Walter Braemer estimated that between September 5 and 8, at least 400 people were shot in Bydgoszcz. Meanwhile, Werner Kampe calculated the number of killed residents of the city during this time to be between 200 and 300 people. The first executions were quite spontaneous and chaotic. Polish civilians were shot at various locations in the city during this time: in the barracks of the 16th Greater Poland Uhlan Regiment on Szubińska Street, in the barracks of the 15th Greater Poland Light Artillery Regiment on Gdańska Street, at the city stadium on Mościckiego Avenue (now Sportowa Street), at the airport on Jagiellońska Street, near the wall of the prison on Wały Jagiellońskie Street, and in the vicinity of the municipal hospital on Bielawki. The brutality of the Germans was fueled by the belief that Bydgoszcz was engulfed in a "Polish uprising". This was evidenced by the occasional shots fired by "partisans" in the city. However, it is difficult to assess how many times German soldiers were actually attacked by Poles and how many times these incidents were simply the result of uncontrolled gunfire, caused by inexperienced and "partisan psychosis"-ridden German recruits.

On 8 September 1939, Major General Walter Braemer (commander of the 580th rear area army) was appointed as the military commander of Bydgoszcz. However, just two days later, actual power in the city was taken over by Werner Kampe – the head of the local Nazi Party cell (later, from the end of September, the Lord Mayor of Bydgoszcz). In the city and surrounding areas, the first structures of Selbstschutz (Note: Bydgoszcz's Selbstschutz reached a membership of 1,500.) – a paramilitary formation composed of representatives of the German national minority inhabiting the pre-war territory of the Second Polish Republic – began to be formed. Due to the chaos in the city and the alleged threat from "ubiquitous" Polish partisans, the command of the German 4th Army ordered Braemer (a pre-war active member of the Schutzstaffel) to conduct a more organized "cleansing operation". (Note: German historians have written that Braemer "was operating with Bischoff on the same wavelength" (Böhler, Mallmann & Matthäus (2009, p. 79)).)

The general crackdown on the residents of Bydgoszcz began on September 8. Braemer issued an order on that day for the cleansing of the city from "criminal Polish elements". German soldiers and police officers cordoned off Polish-inhabited districts and systematically searched house by house, apartment by apartment. In case of finding weapons (which could include commemorative sabers, hunting rifles, or police batons), male occupants were shot on the spot. The remaining "suspects" were directed to a makeshift prison organized in the barracks of the 15th Light Artillery Regiment. By the morning of September 9, around 400–500 people were imprisoned, and by September 10, the number of detainees increased to 1,400. The purges primarily affected districts considered by the occupiers as the most dangerous, such as Szwederowo. (Note: Szwederowo was pacified by the Germans twice – on September 7 and 10. On September 8 a large roundup was organized in Śródmieście. Smaller roundups also took place in other districts of the city – in Jachcice and near Kujawska Street.) On September 10, the command of the 580th rear area army evaluated in the war diary that: [...] in the vilest district inhabited by the commies, about 120 people were shot, and another 900 were arrested. Excesses must have occurred during the "cleansing operation" because Braemer felt compelled to issue an order specifying that every person found with a weapon should be brought before the Sondergericht, rather than immediately shot. Bischoff's orders went in a completely different direction; he ordered to shoot all persons who in any way seem suspicious, declaring at the same time to his Schutzstaffel men that in this action, everyone can prove themselves a true man.

On September 9, the first public execution took place in the Old Market Square in Bydgoszcz, where 20 people were killed. The Poles gathered in the square before the execution were beaten with rifle butts, forced to fall and rise, and stand for hours with their hands raised. When a German soldier was shot on the night of September 9 to 10, Braemer ordered that the next day, another 20 hostages be shot in the Bydgoszcz market square. On September 10, five other civilians were shot in the square – allegedly while attempting to escape. It was not uncommon for local Volksdeutsche to pass among the rows of detained Poles and Jews, pointing out supposed participants of the Bydgoszcz "Bloody Sunday" to the escort. These people were then separated from the rest of the prisoners, marked with a cross sign using white paint, and shot. In this way, among others, 20 Poles detained on Saperów Street perished.

In total, during Braemer's tenure (September 8–11, 1939), around 370 Poles were murdered in Bydgoszcz. Out of this group, about 120–150 people were ordered by SS-Brigadeführer Beutel (in agreement with Braemer) to be shot by Einsatzgruppe IV officers in the forests near Bydgoszcz.

On September 11, the German Supreme Command of the Army (Oberkommando des Heeres) informed the 4th Army that Hitler, due to the rebellious Polish population in Bydgoszcz, ordered the Reichsführer-SS to take 500 hostages and undertake the most severe measures (summary executions) until the city is pacified. The army is to be ordered not to interfere with the Reichsführer-SS authorities. The extermination action in Bydgoszcz then took a new course. Poles accused of participating in the "Bloody Sunday" and intelligentsia were now being liquidated. The main role in the repressive actions was played by Selbstschutz, its formations, and Ordnungspolizei. On September 18, Einsatzgruppe IV officers directed the first transport consisting of 62 people from Bydgoszcz to the Dachau concentration camp. At the same time, a secret order was issued to the Dachau commander to shoot all prisoners upon the arrival of the transport – except for Canon Józef Schulz. (Note: Father Józef Schulz was one of the leaders of the Citizens' Guard. He died in a camp later in the war.) Large roundups continued in various districts. On the night of October 1 to 2, 2,000 Poles were temporarily arrested. On October 6, on the orders of the mayor Kampe, a large roundup was organized, during which anyone who did not have a certificate of employment issued by the Employment Office was detained.

In the first weeks of the occupation, the director of the city gardens in Bydgoszcz, Marian Gunzel, and other Polish employees of the Bydgoszcz city administration disappeared without a trace. (Note: Among them are long-time chairman of the Bydgoszcz City Council Kazimierz Bayer and councilors Jan Góralewski and Tadeusz Janicki.) On 24 September 1939, they were summoned by the Kreisleiter Kampe to a meeting at the town hall. They did not return home that day and remained unaccounted for throughout the entire period of the occupation. Only after the war, in German documents left in the courthouse in Bydgoszcz, was a document found (drawn up in April 1940 for the Ministry of Justice of the Reich), which informed that the Kreisleiter ordered the officials to be taken to the Gdańsk Forest and shot there. Kampe also ordered the murder of their closest relatives to "avoid creating martyrs".

The directives of the military and civilian authorities of the Nazi Germany regarding Bydgoszcz were exceptionally radical, and the actions taken on-site in the first days of the occupation were brutal and arbitrary. Officially, this was a reaction to the sporadic shots allegedly fired by partisans in the city. However, reality did not reflect these claims in any way. Between September 6 and 11 (after the Civic Guard had already laid down their arms), only 2 German soldiers were killed in Bydgoszcz, and 2 others were wounded. According to the German historian Hans Umbreit, the decimation of certain social groups partially overlapped with the methods by which the military and police sought to restore internal order seemingly legally... by conducting an uncompromising fight against partisans, imposing severe penalties for possessing weapons, and undertaking merciless retaliatory actions against innocent people, Hitler's program was partially implemented.

== Internment camp in Bydgoszcz ==
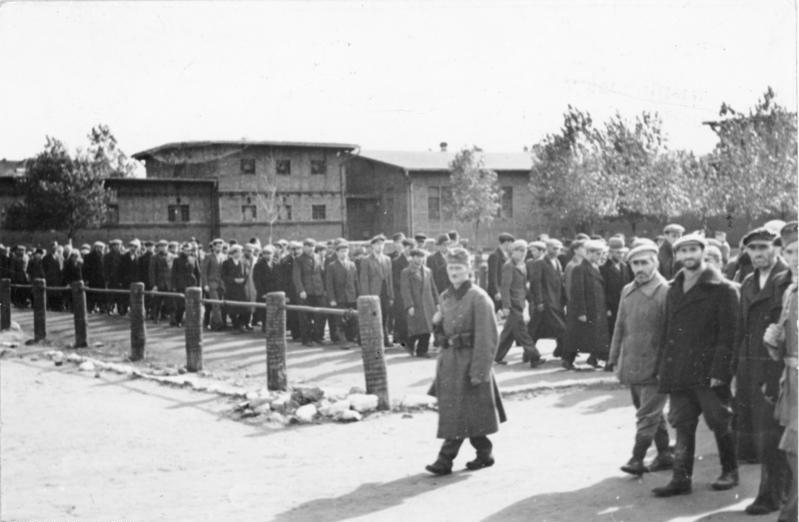
Poles and Jews in the Bydgoszcz internment camp located in the barracks of the 15th Light Artillery Regiment

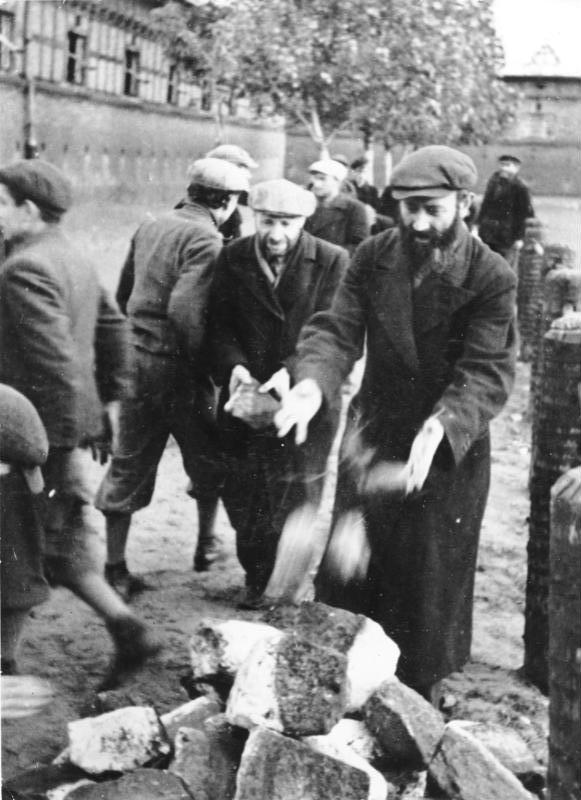
Jews imprisoned in Bydgoszcz internment camp. October 1939

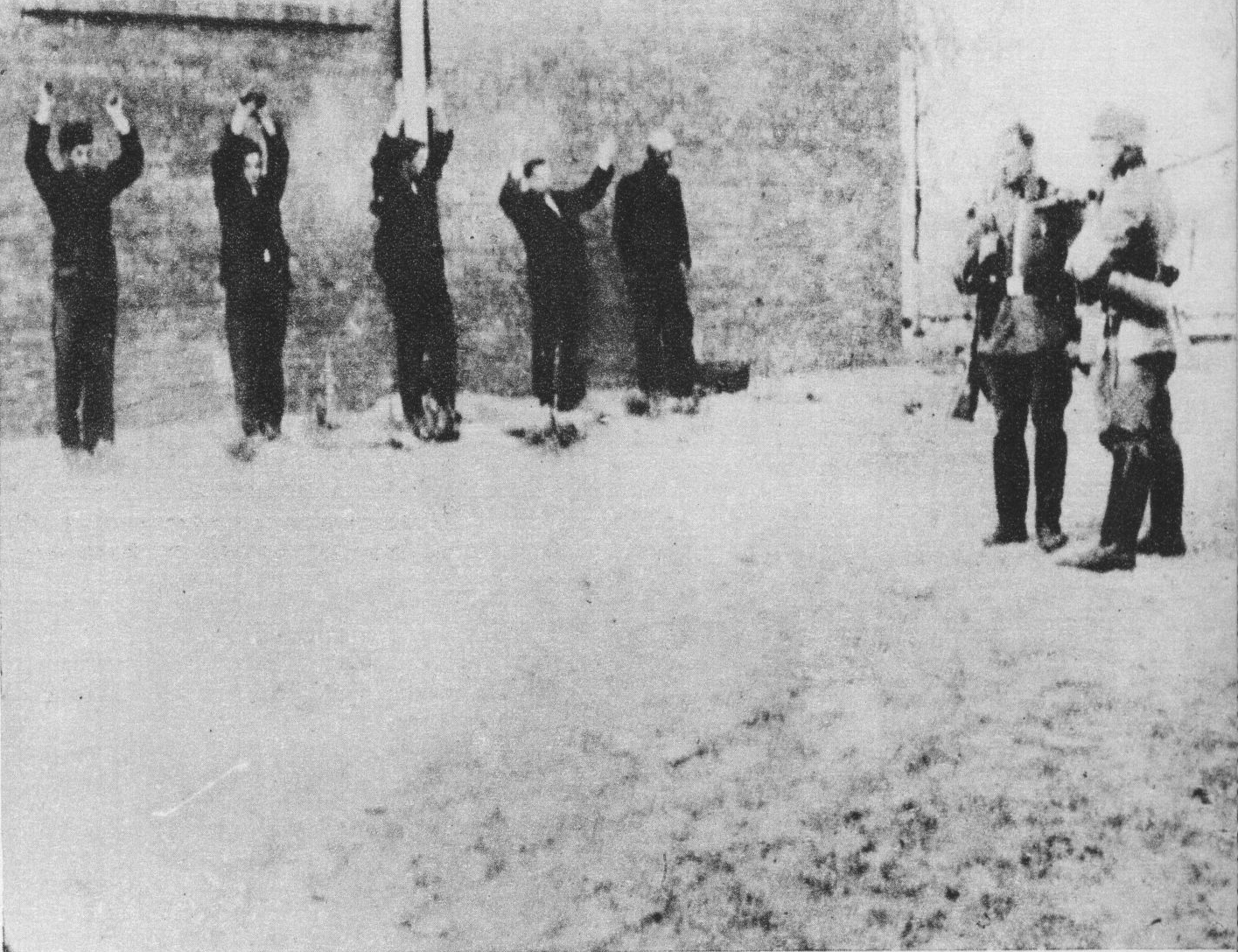
Execution on the territory of the barracks of the 15th Light Artillery Regiment

The residents of Bydgoszcz, arrested during successive "cleansing actions", were placed in a makeshift internment camp (Internierungslager) established on the premises of the barracks of the 15th Light Artillery Regiment at 147 Gdańska Street. (Note: In addition to the residents of Bydgoszcz, Polish soldiers who had been taken prisoner and were trying to break through to southern Poland after their units were broken up in Tuchola Forest were also sent to the internment camp.) The decision to establish this camp was most likely made before the Germans occupied the city. Already on 5 September 1939, the head of the civilian administration board under the command of the 4th Army, SS-Oberführer Fritz Hermann, instructed his field delegates in a written directive to escort arrested Poles who are not trustworthy to internment camps. One of the camps mentioned in this document was the Bydgoszcz Internierungslager.

Usually, the arrested residents of Bydgoszcz were initially taken to assembly points located in the barracks of the 62nd Infantry Regiment at Warszawska Street and in the barracks of the 16th Uhlan Regiment at Szubińska Street. Preliminary personal checks were conducted there, followed by a decision on whether to transfer the detainee to the appropriate camp in the barracks of the 15th Light Artillery Regiment or to release them.

In the barracks at 147 Gdańska Street, the internees were placed in stables or in rooms of the former armory. The camp had deplorable living conditions. For example, teachers imprisoned in the so-called block no. 5 (former stables) were forced to sleep among piles of excrement and swarms of vermin. Very harsh conditions also prevailed in block no. 8 designated for Jews. The internees received meager food rations, and harsh lights were used at night, making sleep difficult for them. They were also forced to endure exhausting roll calls. The camp guards treated the prisoners with great brutality. In the camp office, members of the Einsatzgruppen (in the presence of the camp commandant, Baksa) conducted interrogations, often accompanied by beatings and torture. They tried to coerce the interrogated individuals into admitting membership in the Polish Western Union or other organizations promoting Polish identity. Some prisoners were sent to work on German farms. There were often individual murders committed there by members of the escort (they killed, for example, the most lice-infested prisoners). Additionally, in September 1939, the Germans murdered about 28 people on the premises of the barracks or in their immediate vicinity.

Maria Wardzyńska estimates that in September 1939 alone, about 3,500 people were imprisoned in the barracks of the 15th Light Artillery Regiment. However, it is difficult to establish the total number of prisoners who passed through the Bydgoszcz Internierungslager. German numerical data does not seem reliable in this regard. Firstly, compared to post-war accounts, they appear to be underestimated. (Note: For example, a former soldier of the 35th Infantry Regiment, Kazimierz Grynczel, reported that after the regiment was broken up in Tuchola Forest, he was sent on September 9 to an internment camp in Bydgoszcz in a group of about 200 soldiers. German documents, on the other hand, say that 25 Polish soldiers were led to the camp that day (Ciechanowski (1988, p. 58)).) Secondly, the number of internees was constantly changing. Large groups of prisoners were sent to agricultural work, some were released, some were handed over to the prosecutor's office at the Bydgoszcz Special Court, and some were resettled to central Poland. At the end of September 1939, a transport of about 150 people was sent to the Buchenwald concentration camp. (Note: Prisoners from Bydgoszcz were treated exceptionally cruelly at Buchenwald. The 124 Bydgoszcz prisoners were confined in a cage constructed of barbed wire measuring 3 by 6 meters. The prisoners stayed there continuously in the open air, receiving only half a portion of soup per head and 2–4 loaves of bread per day for the entire group. Within four weeks, they all died of starvation or exhaustion (Bartnicki (1985, p. 60)).) In mid-October, a similar-sized transport, consisting mostly of captured Polish soldiers, was sent to the concentration camp in Nowy Port in Gdańsk. New prisoners continued to arrive, especially with the intensification of actions against the Polish intelligentsia. Additionally, from the first days of October, internees were transported to remote locations near Bydgoszcz, where they were shot.

On 25 October 1939, the military administration in the occupied Polish territories was liquidated. The Bydgoszcz Internierungslager was then subordinated to the police authorities, and military guards were replaced by a police camp guard. The military authorities, by transferring the camp to police jurisdiction, also demanded its relocation from the barracks area, as they intended to use the buildings for the needs of Wehrmacht units stationed in Bydgoszcz. As a result, the frequency of deportations and executions increased significantly. In the last days of October, among others, the "Jewish block" was finally emptied. On 1 November 1939, the Internierungslager was moved to former ammunition warehouses in the Jachcice suburb. At that time, about 300 prisoners were still in the camp. By the end of December 1939, the Bydgoszcz Internierungslager was finally liquidated. Some prisoners were released, some were sent to forced labor in the depths of the Reich, and the rest were deported to the Stutthof concentration camp.

Arrested Poles were also held in several other places in Bydgoszcz. Some were taken to the Selbstschutz prison, located in the building of the former Polish Club at 50 Gdańska Street. Many people (mainly Polish Western Union activists) were also taken to the basement of the building at 6 Poniatowskiego Street, where the Bydgoszcz Gestapo headquarters were located. The arrested Poles were held there in appalling conditions and subjected to torture and various forms of harassment. At the Poniatowskiego Street building, at least 19 known residents of Bydgoszcz were killed in executions or as a result of mistreatment.

== Activities of the German Special Court ==
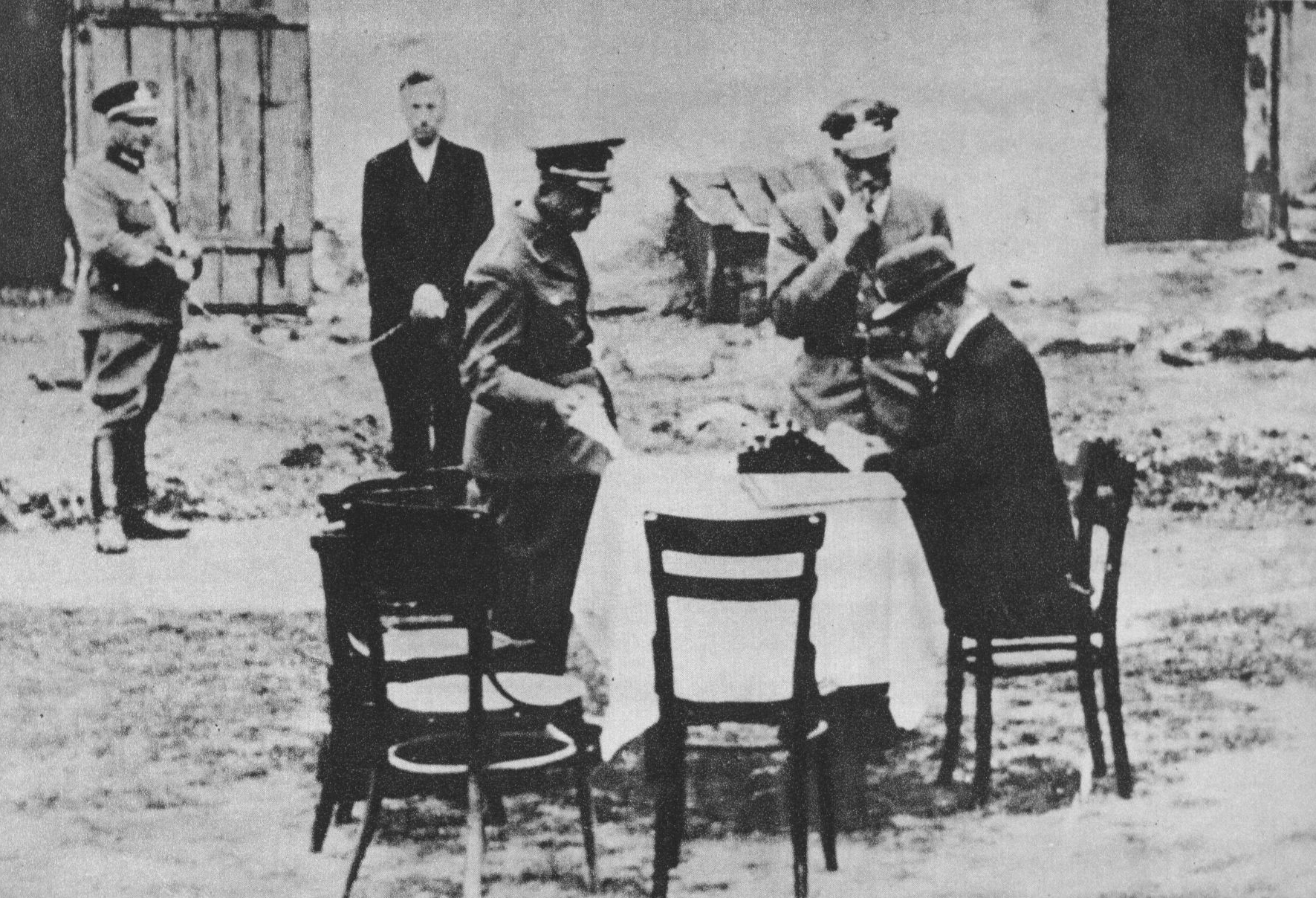
Session of the Sondergericht Bromberg

The Nazi authorities were determined to exploit the propaganda potential of the distorted narrative surrounding the events of September 3 and 4, 1939. The task of officially judging and "punishing" Poles suspected of involvement in the incidents of the "Bloody Sunday" was entrusted to the Special Court in Bydgoszcz (German: Sondergericht Bromberg). The establishment of special courts in the occupied territories of Poland (including Bydgoszcz) was planned before 1 September 1939. Initially, the personnel of the Bydgoszcz court consisted of judges and prosecutors delegated from Piła. However, on September 17, Sondergericht Bromberg was reinforced by a group of lawyers sent from Berlin. The activities of the court were also heavily influenced by a special commission of the Kriminalpolizei, headed by Dr. Bernd Wehner. The commission provided the court with identified "perpetrators, instigators, and accomplices" supposedly involved in the incidents of the "Bloody Sunday". The activity of Sondergericht Bromberg was inaugurated personally by Roland Freisler, Undersecretary of State in the Ministry of Justice of the Reich. (Note: On 9 September 1939, in the diary of the 580th rear army area, it was noted: "Visit of State Secretary Freisler. Informs about the establishment of special courts in Bydgoszcz. Inquires whether verdicts have already been pronounced. I can only inform that so far only the military had a say and several hundred civilians have been shot for carrying weapons or resisting. Freisler expresses that verdicts of the special and military courts are desired" (Böhler, Mallmann & Matthäus (2009, p. 136)).)

The Prosecutor's Office at the Special Court in Bydgoszcz began its work on 6 September 1939 (the day after the capture of Bydgoszcz by Wehrmacht units). The exact date of the start of operations by Sondergericht Bromberg is uncertain. Depending on the sources, it is stated to have occurred between September 8 and 10, 1939. Documents preserved from the Wehrmacht indicate that the court began its work on 9 September 1939. Just two days later, three death sentences were issued. (Note: Sentenced to death were: 19-year-old laborer Bernard Zieliński, 35-year-old drugstore owner Jan Owczarzak, and 55-year-old Jakub Przybyl (Bartnicki (1985, p. 46)).) Until July 1940, all death sentences issued by Sondergericht Bromberg were carried out by the execution platoon of the gendarmerie in the courtyard of the prison at 4 Wały Jagiellońskie Street.

Proceedings conducted before the Special Court in Bydgoszcz were a mockery of fair legal process. During these proceedings, not only basic principles of law were violated, but even the provisions of Nazi criminal procedure were disregarded. In cases related to the events of September 3 and 4, 1939, investigations were not conducted, but rather interrogations. The accused – including women and minors – were routinely tortured and intimidated to force confessions to the alleged crimes. As a result, absurd situations arose – on one occasion, a tortured Polish man confessed to killing a Volksdeutsch who had actually survived the "Bloody Sunday" unscathed. Polish witnesses were also intimidated, and they were often prevented from freely testifying. The investigation materials were usually concise and unreliable, and the indictments often relied on the testimony of one person or simply on a written report of the alleged crime. Defendants were prevented, on trivial pretexts, from calling witnesses in their defense. Witness testimonies were not translated into Polish, and defendants were not allowed to question the witnesses. Defendants who knew German and questioned the testimony of Volksdeutsche were denied the right to provide extensive explanations (they could only give short answers to questions asked of them), and were even accused of audacity. Polish testimonies were generally not believed when they contradicted the testimony of Germans. A common practice of German judges was to waive the oath for Polish witnesses, while maintaining this requirement for German witnesses. In cases where testimonies were mutually contradictory, Polish witnesses – as unsworn – were considered unreliable. During trials, judges did not hide their bias, insulting the accused as "Polish Untermenschen", "Polish bandits", "rabble", "scum", "people unworthy of living among Germans", or referring to them as "members of a nation subject to the German nation" (prosecutors acted similarly). Meanwhile, German lawyers, who theoretically were supposed to defend the accused Poles, typically remained completely passive. They usually did not even request permission to visit their clients or submit any evidence. During trials, they did not protest against the judges' and prosecutors' violation of the law, did not consult with their clients, did not question witnesses or defendants. In some cases, certain lawyers even requested the "just punishment" of their clients or even their condemnation to death.

The analysis of the court judgments in the cases related to the events of 3–4 September 1939, indicates that the court aimed to quickly convict as many people as possible. This goal was primarily served by the application of the previously unknown concept in German law of "expanded aiding and abetting in murder" (German: Mord nach erweiterten Mittäterbegriff). (Note: This was served by a far-reaching interpretation of paragraph 47 of the German Criminal Code, which proclaimed that: "if several commit a crime jointly, each is subject to punishment as a perpetrator" (Zarzycki (2000, pp. 54, 56)).) Poles were thus convicted of complicity in murder if during the incidents in Bydgoszcz on 3–4 September 1939, they spoke hostilely and insultingly towards Volksdeutsche; pointed out to soldiers or policemen the places from which insurgents were firing shots; helped to bring arrested Germans to military facilities or police stations, etc. A certain butcher was sentenced to death because he allegedly "knocked a Volksdeutsch off his bike". Even a Pole who pointed out to soldiers a bakery owned by a German, where they requisitioned several loaves of bread, was convicted. Poles were also mass sentenced under the charge of disturbing public peace. In this way, the Germans obtained a tool that allowed them to punish even passive participants in the "Bloody Sunday" (e.g., onlookers participating in gatherings). Additionally, Polish soldiers, policemen, and members of paramilitary organizations fighting against sabotage were collectively treated as looters – rather than individuals carrying out official duties on the orders of their superiors.

By 31 December 1939, the Sondergericht Bromberg had considered 1,005 cases, filing 160 indictments. 147 defendants were convicted: 100 people to death (including 13 women), 10 people to life imprisonment, 23 people to severe imprisonment (totaling 295 years), and 14 people to ordinary imprisonment (totaling 69 years). 21 people were acquitted. The average sentence of severe imprisonment imposed by the special court in Bydgoszcz was 12 years and 8 months, and for "ordinary" imprisonment – 4 years and 9 months. For comparison, during the same period, the other six German special courts operating in occupied Poland handed down a total of 56 death sentences. By the end of the war, the Bydgoszcz Special Court in cases related to the "Bloody Sunday" events sentenced 243 people to death (including one of German nationality). As a result, the Sondergericht Bromberg was hailed by the Nazi press as the sharpest weapon against the Polish rabble and Polish murderers (Danziger Vorposten, 1 February 1940).

== Extermination of the "Polish leadership class" ==
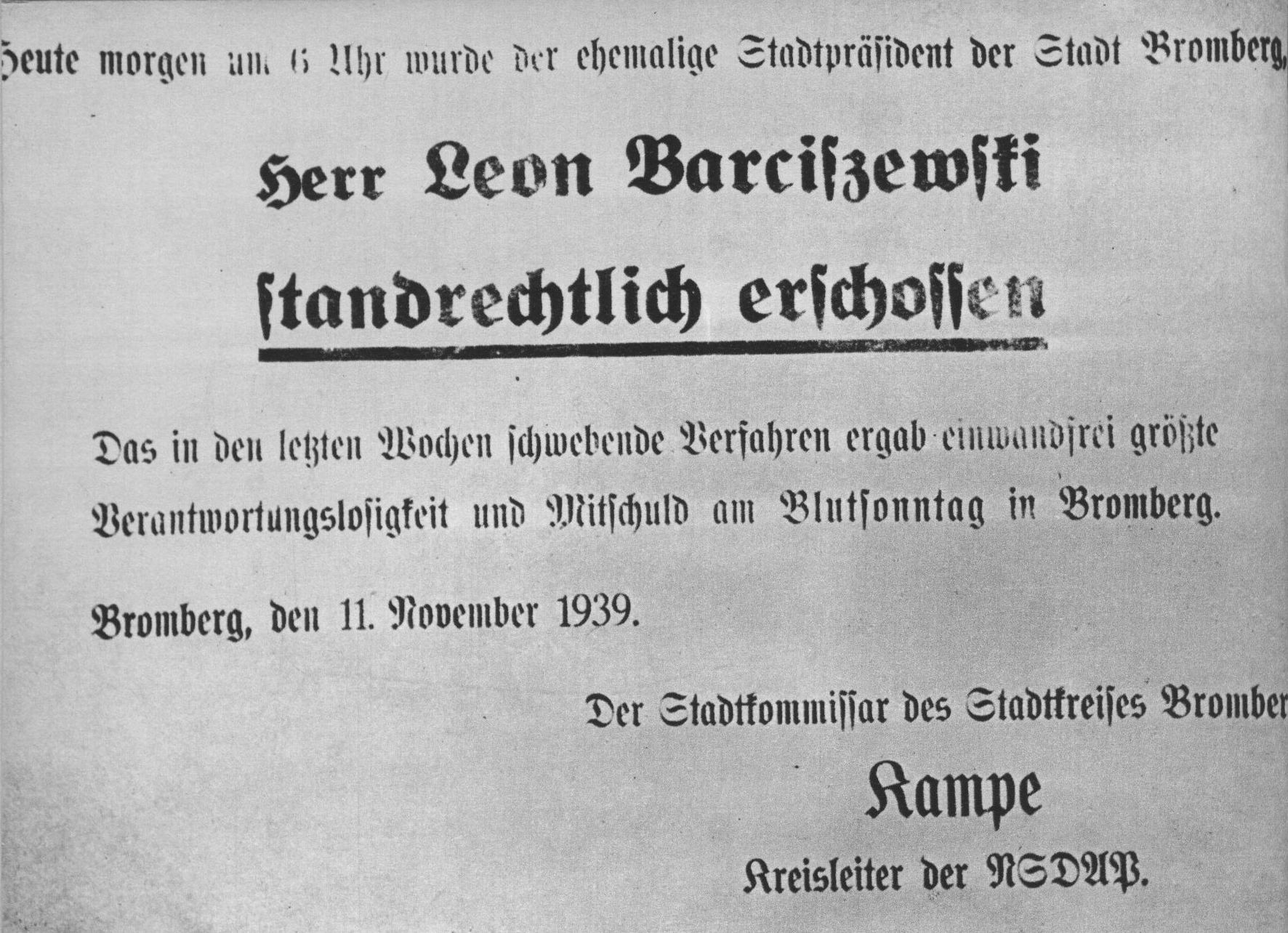
Announcement from Mayor Kampe, informing of the execution on 11 November 1939 of the last pre-war mayor of Bydgoszcz – Leon Barciszewski

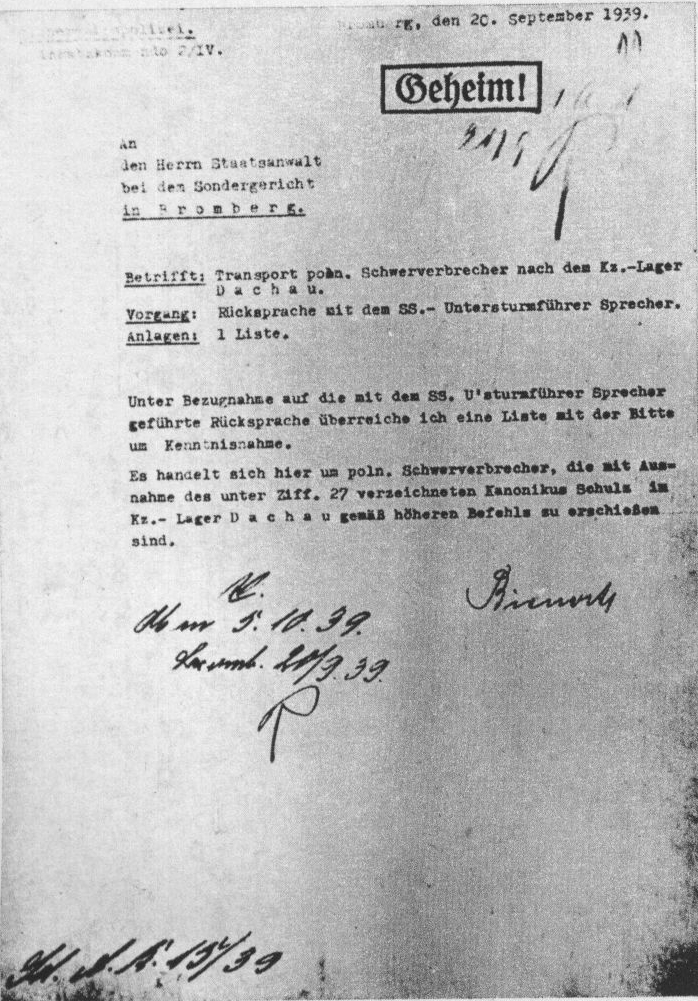
A letter informing that a transport with 62 Polish prisoners from Bydgoszcz was sent to Dachau concentration camp on 18 September 1939

While in the early days of the occupation, reprisals often had a random nature, in the following weeks, they were targeted at specific professional groups (such as teachers, Catholic clergy), social environments, and members of organizations and associations promoting Polish identity (such as the Polish Western Union, Maritime and Colonial League, or the Insurgents and Veterans Association). Arrests were carried out according to the established mechanism of "cleansing actions" that had been used in the initial days of the occupation. On 14 October 1939, a raid was organized against Polish teachers, during which 186 educators were arrested. On the night of October 18–19, a raid was conducted against members of the Polish Western Union, resulting in the arrest of 91 individuals (including 21 women). On October 20, the Germans conducted a large-scale roundup in the vicinity of Kujawska Street. Nearly 1,200 people were temporarily arrested at that time. After interrogations, 27 individuals were identified whose names appeared on proscription lists, police files, or were reported by Volksdeutsche. In November, arrests of Catholic priests began. A large-scale "pacification action" (Befriedungsaktion) was also carried out on November 11, the Polish Independence Day. This operation involved 115 groups consisting of Gestapo, Kripo, Schutzpolizei officers, and members of Selbstschutz. Nearly 3,800 people were detained during this operation. This was the last major roundup organized by the Germans in Bydgoszcz.

Most of the Poles and Jews detained during these raids were taken to the Bydgoszcz Internierungslager. There, the fate of the detainees was decided by a special commission operating in the camp, initially composed of Einsatzgruppe IV officers. After several weeks, Einsatzgruppe IV left the city, and a branch of the so-called Einsatzkommando 16, established in Gdańsk, was introduced to Bydgoszcz. The 20-member group of Gdańsk Schutzstaffel men was led by criminal counselor (Kriminalrat) Jakob Lölgen. His office collaborated with a small Sicherheitsdienst unit led by SS-Sturmbannführer Dr. Rudolf Oebsger-Röder, also part of Einsatzkommando 16. Lölgen's commission decided which prisoners should be released or deported to the General Government, which should be sent to concentration camps, and which should be executed on the spot. Often, German women would also appear in the camp to select individuals for execution. This "procedure" involved pointing out a prisoner and stating that they had participated in the "Bloody Sunday" in Bydgoszcz.

Those sentenced to death were executed without trial in remote locations near Bydgoszcz, such as the Gdańsk Forest, forests near Tryszczyn, Borówno, and Otorowo, or primarily, the "Valley of Death" in Fordon. The choice of execution sites was determined by factors such as ease of access, short distance from the city, and terrain. The murders were typically carried out by members of the Selbstschutz. Only volunteers were included in the execution squads. (Note: Testimony of Josef Meier, one of the commanders of the Bydgoszcz Selbstschutz (Böhler, Mallmann & Matthäus (2009, p. 172)).) Many of the victims were listed in the Sonderfahndungsbuch Polen – a list of individuals earmarked for execution prepared before the war by the central leadership of Nazi Germany. The overall supervision of the extermination operation was overseen by the commander of the Pomeranian Selbstschutz, SS-Oberführer Ludolf von Alvensleben, who resided in Bydgoszcz.

The criminal activities of the Selbstschutz and Einsatzgruppen were actively supported by Werner Kampe, the head of the district Nazi Party organization and the lord mayor of Bydgoszcz. Julius Hoppenrath, the chief president of the Gdańsk revenue administration, wrote in 1955 that particularly active in this field was the then head of the district party organization Kampe. Polish intelligentsia paid for his activities with their lives. The Kreisleiter repeatedly ordered the Gestapo in Bydgoszcz to liquidate entire families deemed particularly "dangerous" for various reasons. Kampe and his associates ruthlessly looted the homes of arrested or expelled Poles, or occupied them for their own use. It often happened that when the rightful owners tried to reclaim their property, Kampe instructed the Gestapo to eliminate them.

High-ranking officials of Nazi Germany took a keen interest in the proceedings with the population of Bydgoszcz. On 20 September 1939, Bydgoszcz was visited by the Reichsführer-SS, Heinrich Himmler. During his stay in the city, he listened to a "model trial before the summary court" and later participated in an execution conducted 10 kilometers from Bydgoszcz, personally directed by the commander of the Bydgoszcz Selbstschutz, SS-Sturmbannführer Josef Meier (known as "Bloody Meier" or "Meier the Elephant"). Albert Forster, the Gauleiter and Reichsstatthalter in the Reichsgau Danzig-West Prussia district, also personally visited the Bydgoszcz Internierungslager. The aforementioned Hoppenrath wrote that Forster also contributed to the retaliatory actions taken, especially in Bydgoszcz, with his speeches... Kampe's anti-Polish actions at the time were at least known to the gauleiter, if not suggested and accepted by him. The internment camp was also visited by Robert Ley (head of the German Labour Front) and Wilhelm Frick (Minister of the Interior of the Reich).

=== Executions in the forests of Tryszczyn ===
Initially, the mass executions by the Germans were carried out in the forests near Tryszczyn, north of Bydgoszcz. Around the end of September and beginning of October 1939, approximately 900 people were shot in firing ditches along the Brda river. Three or even four times a day, trucks brought in more groups of convicts from Bydgoszcz, usually numbering around fifty to seventy people each. The victims were ordered to enter the trenches and lie down on the ground, in rows of five or six people, before being shot in the back of the head. After the final execution, the perpetrators organized a celebration at a nearby forester's lodge, which they called the "highwaymen's party".

Among those murdered in Tryszczyn were the majority of the 370 Jews imprisoned in the barracks of the 15th Light Artillery Regiment (mostly from Dobrzyń); about 70 Polish Girl Scouts and Boy Scouts; as well as many women, elderly individuals, and even 12-year-old children. Recovered shells and bullets from French-made weapons indicate that the killings were carried out by members of the Bydgoszcz Selbstschutz (Selbstschutzmen typically used captured weapons).

There is an account of one of the executions, conducted in the early days of October 1939. Around 100 prisoners from the camp in the barracks of the 15th Light Artillery Regiment (Poles and Jews) were transported to the forests of Tryszczyn in two trucks. The prisoners had to make the final journey lying down to avoid being noticed by the local population. They were then led in groups of 15 people to the firing ditches, where they were shot. (Note: Testimony of Ewald S., member of the Bydgoszcz Selbstschutz (Böhler, Mallmann & Matthäus (2009, pp. 172–173)).)

=== Fordon "Valley of Death" ===
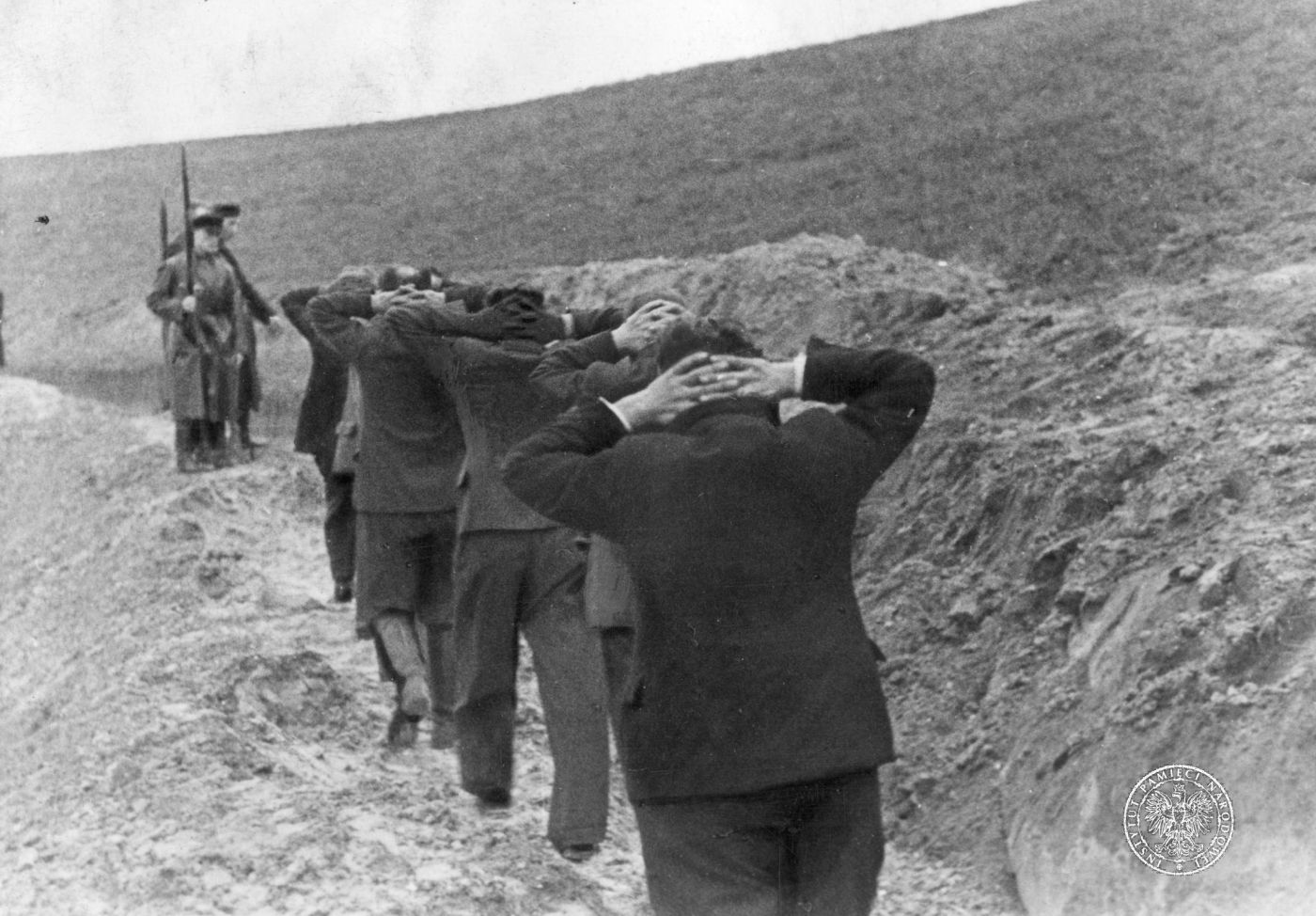
Polish teachers on their way to execution in the "Valley of Death"

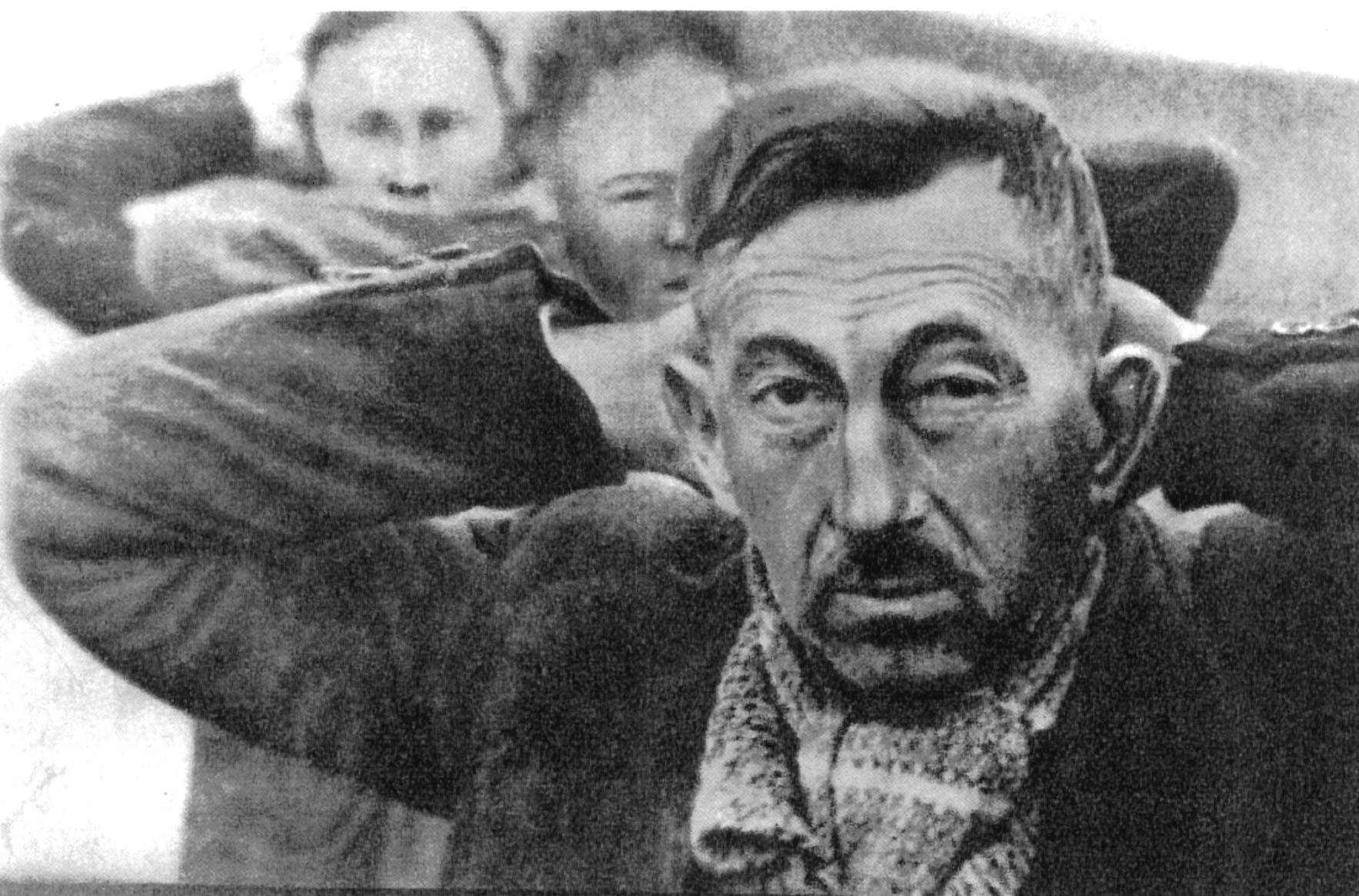
Group of teachers photographed moments before execution

Due to the overcrowding of mass graves prepared in Tryszczyn and Borówno, the Germans began to search for a new location where they could conduct collective executions. Their choice fell on a valley located about 12 kilometres (7.5 miles) northeast of Bydgoszcz, near Fordon – which was then an independent city (now a district of Bydgoszcz). This location was chosen primarily because of its distance from human habitation. The narrow and winding valley, situated between the second and third hills of the Miedzyńskie Hills, (Note: The Miedzyńskie Hills form the northern edge of the Vistula river valley.) henceforth gained the name "Valley of Death". In early October 1939, even before the start of mass executions, a unit of the German Arbeitsdienst (Labour Service) arrived there and began digging long, 2.5-meter deep trenches. The work lasted for several days.

The first execution of people of Bydgoszcz took place in the "Valley of Death" on 10 October 1939. The extermination action continued there until November 11, and according to some sources, until 26 November 1939. Victims were brought to the execution site by trucks, most often from places of imprisonment such as the Bydgoszcz Internierungslager. After being stripped of their outer clothing and valuables, the convicts were shot in the back of the head or, less frequently, by machine gun fire. The wounded were finished off with shots from pistols, rifle butts, or sometimes simply buried alive. The execution squads consisted primarily of members of the Bydgoszcz Selbstschutz (led by SS-Sturmbannführers Spaarmann and Meier) and Fordon (the latter commanded by Friedrich Walther Gassmann), as well as Schutzstaffel men from the Bydgoszcz branch of Einsatzkommando 16.

Historians are unable to determine how many Poles and Jews were shot in the "Valley of Death", largely due to the lack of documented sources of the Fordon massacre. (Note: Quite rich photographic documentation of the crimes, however, was managed to obtain from Ludolf von Alvensleben's album (the so-called Album of Glory of the Selbstschutz). The photos taken by the executioners prove the dignity-filled behavior of the condemned in the face of death.) Depending on the sources, estimates range from 2,000 to 3,000 victims. During an exhumation conducted in 1947, the remains of 306 victims were found. However, it is estimated that the "Valley of Death" still holds between 700 to 1,600 undiscovered bodies. Therefore, the most probable number of victims of the Fordon massacre is between 1,200 and 1,400 people.

It is estimated that as a result of the executions carried out in the "Valley of Death", 48% of Bydgoszcz high school teachers, about 33% of clergy, 15% of elementary school teachers, and nearly 14% of doctors and lawyers were killed. On 11 November 1939, the pre-war mayor of Bydgoszcz, Leon Barciszewski, was also killed there, along with his son. (Note: In the situational report from 17 November 1939, criminal counselor Jakob Lölgen reported that "in agreement with Kreisleiter Kampe, on that day, former Polish mayor of Bydgoszcz, Leon Barciszewski, was executed by order of the summary court because intelligence indicated that he should be considered the most vehement enemy of the Germans and that he did not use his position and status to prevent the local disturbances on September 3 and 4, 1939" (Böhler, Mallmann & Matthäus (2009, p. 205)).) The Fordon "Valley of Death" is the largest mass grave in Bydgoszcz and also serves as a symbol of the martyrdom of the city's inhabitants.

=== Other execution sites ===
The secret executions of Bydgoszcz residents were also carried out by the occupiers in other remote locations near the city:

- In the Gdańsk Forest, among others, the aforementioned officials of the Bydgoszcz city administration were shot, deceitfully lured by Kampe to a supposed meeting, as well as numerous prisoners brought from the Gestapo headquarters on Poniatowski Street or from the Selbstschutz detention center in the former Polish Club. An exhumation conducted in the Gdańsk Forest in September 1947 led to the discovery of 84 bodies buried in three mass graves.
- In Otorowo near Vistula river, members of Einsatzkommando 16 executed several hundred people in October and November 1939. Among the murdered were residents of Bydgoszcz and nearby villages such as Wudzyn, Otorowo, Osielsko, Stronno, and Żołędowo. The victims' bodies were burned in 1944 as part of efforts to cover up the crime. After the war, the names of only 33 victims were identified.
- It is likely that residents of Bydgoszcz were also murdered near Borówno Lake (in the Nekla village in the Gmina Dobrcz). Executions were carried out along trenches dug on both sides of a dirt road connecting the Bydgoszcz–Gdańsk road section with the southern end of the lake. In the autumn of 1939, the Germans shot about 800 Poles there (estimated data) – mostly residents of the Świecie County. In June 1944, the bodies from most of the graves were dug up and burned as part of efforts to cover up the crime. During the exhumation conducted in October 1945, the remains of 102 people were found. Among the murdered were mostly young people, and a number of women were also recognized.

== The beginning of the Germanization campaign ==
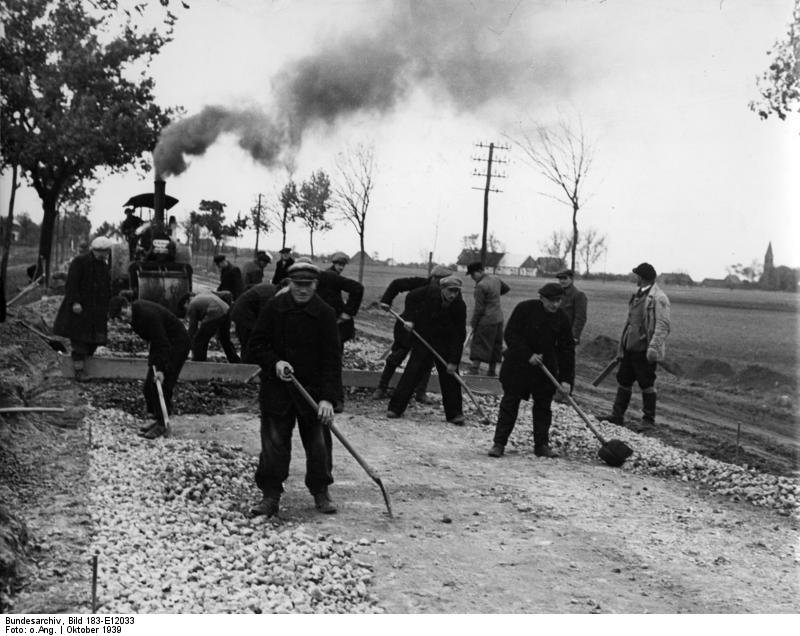
Bydgoszcz area. Polish men forced to work on road repairs

Almost immediately after the occupation of Bydgoszcz began, the German authorities initiated a series of actions aimed at the complete Germanization of the city and making Poles aware that they would now constitute a lower social class – subordinate to Germans and destined solely for physical labor. The driving force behind these actions was especially Kreisleiter Kampe, who during a meeting for Volksdeutsche on 1 October 1939, publicly addressed the Bydgoszcz Germans with the words we are here to command, and the Poles to listen, and announced that any attempts at resistance by Poles would be crushed immediately. In a similar spirit, Gauleiter Albert Forster spoke during a rally on October 11, when he first announced mass deportations of Poles.

Already on 14 September 1939, Kampe organized the first registration of Volksdeutsche in Bydgoszcz. Another, much more thorough census, was conducted in November. At the same time, the Bydgoszcz Arbeitsamt (Labour Office) began registering people capable of work, with the aim of identifying Poles from Galicia or the former Congress Poland who had settled in Bydgoszcz after 1918. These people were primarily earmarked for deportation (alongside Jews and families of victims of the Intelligenzaktion). Initially, attempts were made to persuade the "Congressists" to leave the city through persuasion or indirect harassment (such as banning them from using various health and social facilities). Refugees who tried to return to Bydgoszcz after the end of the war but could not prove purely Bydgoszcz roots were not allowed to return to their homes. Later, forced deportations began. The first transport of expelled "Congressists", numbering 476 people, was sent to the General Government on October 27. Another 550 residents of Bydgoszcz were deported to central Poland on November 4. The property of expelled Poles was confiscated and made available to the so-called Entschädigungsstelle Bromberg (Compensation Office Bydgoszcz), organized by Kampe. The task of the office was to pay compensation to Volksdeutsche who were allegedly harmed by Poles – especially during the events of the "Bloody Sunday". In practice, there were so many abuses that the German prosecutor's office became interested, and Gauleiter Forster was forced to remove Kampe from the position of mayor of Bydgoszcz and transfer him to Gdańsk (February 1941).

Additionally, other actions were taken aimed at giving Bydgoszcz a purely German character. On 11 September 1939, owners of shops, restaurants, and craft workshops were prohibited from displaying Polish-language signs in public view (violation of the ban carried a fine of 1,000 RM). Kampe attempted Germanization and complete reconstruction of the downtown district, preceded by confiscations of Polish-owned shops and restaurants located there in 1939. Throughout the city, Germans also took over pharmacies and medical offices belonging to Poles. In December 1939, the synagogue on Jana Kazimierza Street in Bydgoszcz was demolished. Polish monuments were also destroyed. For instance, on September 26, Germans removed the monument of Henryk Sienkiewicz from Jan Kochanowski Park, as well as the tomb of the Unknown Soldier of the Greater Poland Uprising from Bernardyńska Street.

The Polish population of Bydgoszcz also faced a wave of minor harassments. In October 1939, shops and offices were ordered to serve Germans first, and queuing in front of shops was prohibited (effectively targeting only Poles). In the same month, Poles were ordered to remove radio antennas from their homes. They were also subjected to forced labor, especially unemployed intellectuals. At the end of October 1939, Kampe organized a disciplinary labor camp for Polish youth in barracks on Dwernickiego Street. Only Poles born within the borders of the German Empire found themselves in a slightly better situation. They were allowed, among other things, to join the German Labour Front, and their children were allowed to attend elementary schools.

== Aftermath ==
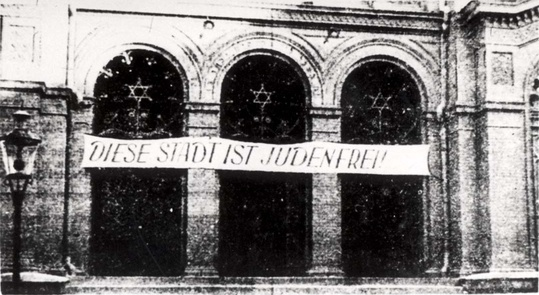
Bydgoszcz Synagogue. The inscription reads: "This city is free of Jews"

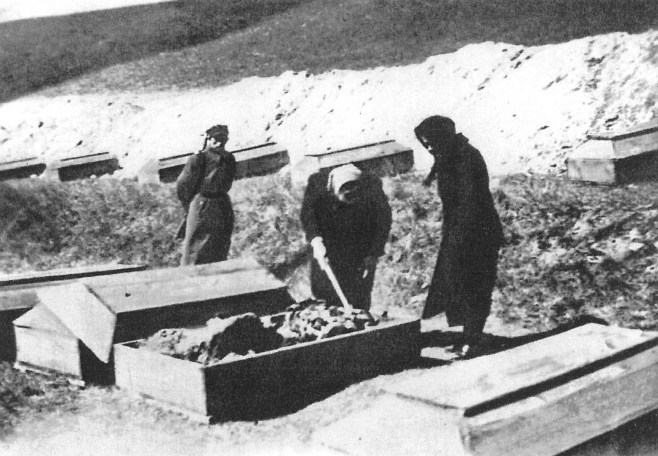
Identification of bodies exhumed in the "Valley of Death"

At the end of November 1939, German terror noticeably abated. Mass executions and roundups were replaced by indirect extermination, with the leading role falling to the German police and judiciary. The Nazis' goal of eliminating the "Polish leadership class" and pacifying the city was essentially achieved. In a situational report dated 17 November 1939, criminal adviser Lölgen reported that there is no longer any Polish intelligentsia in Bydgoszcz that could act actively. A month later, the German authorities announced that Bydgoszcz was a "Jew-free city" (German: Judenfrei).

The issue of the human toll suffered by the population of Bydgoszcz as a result of German repression remains controversial to this day. In 1945, Józef Kołodziejczyk estimated the number of war victims in Bydgoszcz at 36,350 people – nearly one-fourth of the city's pre-war population. This figure was accepted by the communist-era historiography as definitive and became deeply rooted in the public consciousness for decades. It is now known that Kołodziejczyk's estimates were significantly inflated. The authors of the 2004 History of Bydgoszcz assessed that approximately 10,000 residents of Bydgoszcz perished between 1939 and 1945, representing all nationalities residing in the city (7% of the pre-war population). The number of Bydgoszcz residents of Polish origin who died as a result of the indirect and direct extermination carried out by the German occupiers during the 5 years of war is estimated at 5,300.

It is not possible to accurately determine the number of Bydgoszcz residents murdered during the first four months of the occupation. Official German documents from 1939 estimated the number of "liquidated" Poles and Jews at around 900 (including 100 sentenced to death by the Sondergericht Bromberg), but these figures did not account for the victims of secret executions in Tryszczyn, the "Valley of Death", and other locations. Dieter Schenk, relying on findings from the Central Office of the State Justice Administrations for the Investigation of National Socialist Crimes in Ludwigsburg, estimated that nearly 5,000 residents of Bydgoszcz and the Bydgoszcz County were murdered by the end of 1939 as part of the "anti-intelligentsia action". The authors of the History of Bydgoszcz estimated the number of city residents murdered in 1939 at around 1,500–1,900. Wiesław Trzeciakowski, in his work titled Lists of Victims in Bydgoszcz 1939–1945 (Bydgoszcz 2010), managed to establish the names of 900 victims. The same author, in Death in Bydgoszcz 1939–1945 (Bydgoszcz 2011, expanded edition 2012 and 2013), provided 1,500 names along with the circumstances of their deaths (efforts to determine the number of victims are still ongoing). In Tryszczyn, the "Valley of Death", and Otorowo, residents of other towns were also killed – such as the mentioned Jews from Dobrzyń nad Drwęcą. Precisely determining the number of victims of German executions is also difficult due to the action of covering up traces of crimes carried out by the Germans in the final months of the occupation, as well as the fact that post-war exhumations were conducted hastily and carelessly (including the unexpectedly interrupted exhumation work in the "Valley of Death" by the Ministry of Public Security). Therefore, the aforementioned numbers must be treated as approximate.

== Commemoration ==
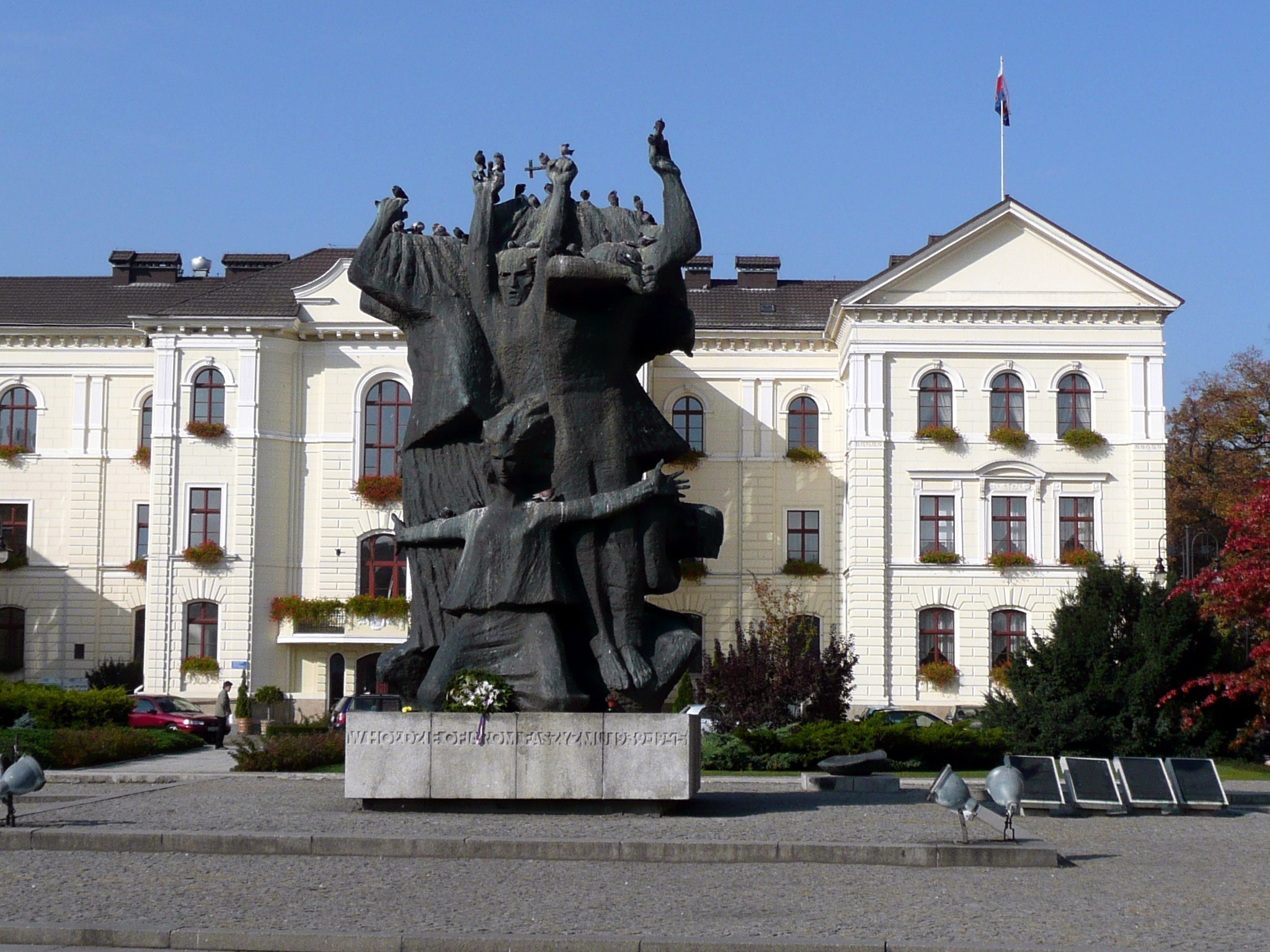
Monument of Struggle and Martyrdom

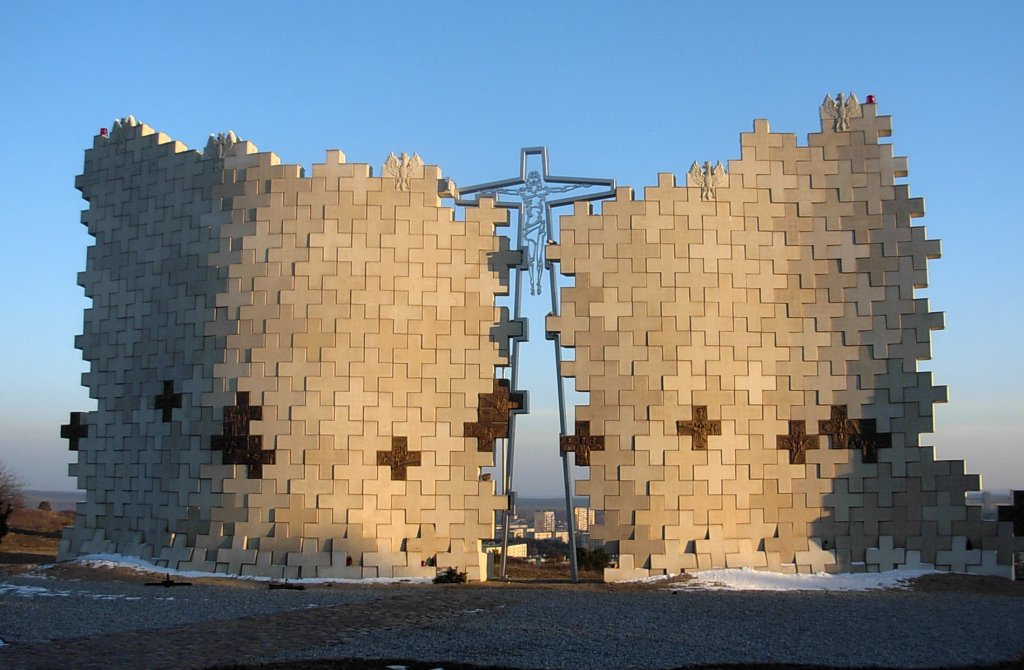
Gate to Heaven – part of the Calvary of Bydgoszcz in the "Valley of Death"

After the end of the war, Polish authorities began investigating the traces of German crimes committed in Bydgoszcz and surrounding areas. From April 28 to May 2, 1947, exhumation work was conducted in the "Valley of Death" near Fordon. During this process, the remains of 306 victims were found, of whom only 39 individuals were identified (identification was difficult because the victims were stripped of all personal belongings). The recovered remains were solemnly buried at the Cemetery of Bydgoszcz Heroes on Freedom Hill. In September of the same year, the bodies of 84 Poles murdered in the Gdańsk Forest were also exhumed.

On 4 May 1948, 128 coffins containing the exhumed remains of 693 people murdered by Germans in Tryszczyn were displayed in the Old Market Square in Bydgoszcz. Subsequently, the coffins were ceremoniously transported and buried at the Cemetery of Bydgoszcz Heroes on Freedom Hill. This was the last major funeral for victims of the Hitlerite occupation of the city.

After the end of World War II, efforts were also made to commemorate the victims of German crimes. On 5 September 1969, the Monument of Struggle and Martyrdom was unveiled in the Old Market Square in Bydgoszcz. An inscription on one of its plaques reads: The Monument of Struggle and Martyrdom commemorates the memory of Polish citizens from Kuyavia, Pomerania, and Chełmno Land who died and were murdered during World War II in the years 1939–1945. Additionally, on 31 August 1975, a monument dedicated to the residents of Bydgoszcz murdered in this place was unveiled on the hill above the "Valley of Death". The monument is surrounded by numerous plaques with the names of individuals who lost their lives there. An inscription on it reads: Fordon's Valley of Death. Place of execution of 1,200 Polish citizens. October 12 – November 11, 1939. Moreover, memorial obelisks and small monuments commemorating the residents of Bydgoszcz murdered by the German occupiers can also be found in other areas of the city – in Jan Kochanowski Park, at the intersection of Kąpielowa and Ludwikowo streets in Jachcice, in the former Fordon market square (now Zwycięstwa Square), in front of the railway directorate building at 63 Dworcowa Street, and at 16 Ugory Street in Szwederowo.

After Pope John Paul II's visit to Bydgoszcz in 1999 and his appeal for the commemoration of the martyrs of our time, the idea of building the "Way of the Cross – Golgotha of the 20th Century" station in the "Valley of Death" emerged. The first station was dedicated in 2004, and the last one was completed in 2009. The culmination of efforts to highlight this place was the elevation on 7 October 2008, by the bishop of the Bydgoszcz diocese, Bishop Jan Tyrawa, of the nearby church along with the Way of the Cross to the dignity of the "Sanctuary of the Queen of Martyrs, Calvary of Bydgoszcz – Golgotha of the 20th Century". The monument from 1975, along with the Stations of the Cross, now constitutes a martyrological complex, which also includes alleys, sculptures, symbolic graves, and commemorative plaques. Every year, patriotic and religious ceremonies, appeals for the fallen, Stations of the Cross, processions, and Passion Plays are held there.

== Liability of perpetrators ==
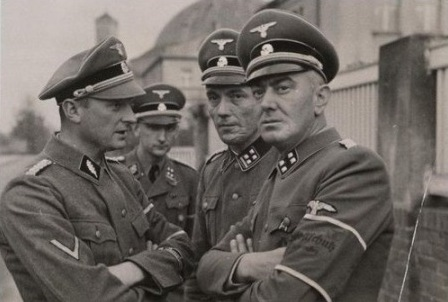
Selbstschutz leaders

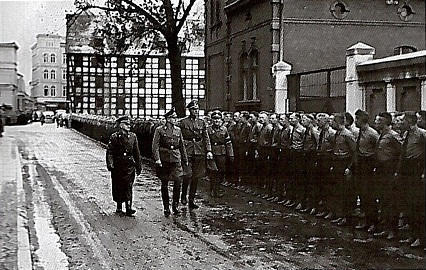
Inspection of a unit of the Bydgoszcz Selbstschutz. From the left: Josef Meier, Werner Kampe, Ludolf von Alvensleben

The majority of perpetrators of crimes committed against the population of Bydgoszcz escaped post-war criminal responsibility. Only a few criminals faced Polish courts. Albert Forster, the Nazi Party Gauleiter and Reich Governor in the Reichsgau Danzig-West Prussia district, was sentenced to death by the National Tribunal in Gdańsk in 1948 for crimes committed in Pomerania between 1939 and 1945. The sentence was carried out on 28 February 1952, in Mokotów Prison. Richard Hildebrandt, a senior SS and police leader in the Danzig-West Prussia district, was sentenced to death by a Polish court in Bydgoszcz. The sentence was executed on 10 March 1951. In the same trial, SS-Brigadeführer Max Henze, who served as the president of the police in Bydgoszcz from 12 October 1939, was also sentenced to death. He was hanged on the same day as Hildebrandt. Eryk Pollatz, an active member of the Selbstschutz responsible for, among other things, the massacre of Jews in Fordon, also stood before the Polish judiciary. By the judgment of the Special Criminal Court dated 4 July 1947, Pollatz was sentenced to death. The sentence was executed.

The leader of the Pomeranian Selbstschutz, Ludolf von Alvensleben, fled to Argentina after the war. Furthermore, according to Dieter Schenk, the West German judiciary knowingly and willingly allowed many criminals to escape punishment. For example, in 1949, a court in Hamburg refused to extradite General Walther Braemer to Poland, allowing him to enjoy freedom until his death in 1955. Proceedings against the commanders of the Bydgoszcz Selbstschutz – Erich Spaarmann (inspectorate chief) and Josef Meier (commander of district structures, known as "Bloody Meier") – were terminated in May 1963. In 1965, the Munich prosecutor's office applied to discontinue the prosecution of former district Nazi Party leader and lord mayor of Bydgoszcz, Werner Kampe, allowing him to continue his business activities as a representative of an insurance company. Proceedings against the commanders of Einsatzgruppe IV – Lothar Beutel and Helmut Bischoff – were also terminated due to lack of evidence of guilt. Dr. Rudolf Oebsger-Röder from the Bydgoszcz Sicherheitsdienst served after the war as the head of the Federal Intelligence Service in Jakarta and worked as a spokesman for the house and court of Indonesian dictator Suharto.

In 1966, Jakob Lölgen and his deputy, Horst Eichler, stood trial in Munich. The indictment accused them of causing the deaths of 349 people, including 74 teachers, 3 doctors, and the mayor of the city, Leon Barciszewski, in Bydgoszcz's extermination actions in a deceitful and low-minded manner. Both defendants were acquitted by the jury, which found that they acted under the coercion of their superiors.

== See also ==
- Massacres in Piaśnica
- Forest of Szpęgawsk
- Stutthof concentration camp

== Bibliography ==
- Bartnicki, Jerzy (1985). Bydgoszcz w roku 1939 (in Polish). Bydgoszcz: Kujawsko-Pomorskie Towarzystwo Kulturalne.
- Bator, Stanisław; Kuczma, Rajmund (1969). Fordon "Dolina Śmierci" (in Polish). Bydgoszcz: Muzeum im. Leona Wyczółkowskiego w Bydgoszczy.
- Biegański, Zdzisław, ed. (1997). Dzieje Fordonu i okolic (in Polish). Bydgoszcz: Kujawsko-Pomorskie Towarzystwo Kulturalne. ISBN 83-86970-02-2.
- Biskup, Marian, ed. (2004). Historia Bydgoszczy. Part 2 (in Polish). Vol. II. Bydgoszcz: Bydgoskie Towarzystwo Naukowe. ISBN 83-921454-0-2.
- Błażejewski, Krzysztof (2010-09-09). "Oto są oprawcy Bydgoszczy". Ekspres Bydgoski (in Polish).
- Błażejewski, Krzysztof (2009-11-05). "Słonik nie przyniósł szczęścia". Ekspres Bydgoski (in Polish).
- Bogusławska, Weronika; Błażejewski, Krzysztof (2010-04-16). "Miasto stanęło w bezruchu". Ekspres Bydgoski (in Polish).
- Böhler, Jochen; Mallmann, Klaus-Michael; Matthäus, Jürgen (2009). Einsatzgruppen w Polsce (in Polish). Warsaw: Bellona. ISBN 978-83-11-11588-0.
- Böhler, Jochen (2009). Zbrodnie Wehrmachtu w Polsce (in Polish). Kraków: Wydawnictwo "Znak". ISBN 978-83-240-1225-1.
- Bojarska, Barbara (1966). "Zbrodnie niemieckie na terenie powiatu Świecie nad Wisłą (1939 r.)". Przegląd Zachodni (in Polish). 1–2.
- Ciechanowski, Konrad (1988). Stutthof: hitlerowski obóz koncentracyjny (in Polish). Warsaw: Interpress. ISBN 83-223-2369-7.
- Gliwiński, Eugeniusz (1997). "Bydgoskie pomniki naszych czasów. Część I". Kalendarz Bydgoski (in Polish). 30. Bydgoszcz.
- Gumkowski, Janusz; Kuczma, Rajmund (1967). Zbrodnie hitlerowskie – Bydgoszcz 1939 (in Polish). Warsaw: Wydawnictwo "Polonia".
- Jastrzębski, Włodzimierz (1974). Terror i zbrodnia. Eksterminacja ludności polskiej i żydowskiej w rejencji bydgoskiej w latach 1939–1945 (in Polish). Warsaw: Interpress.
- Jaszowski, Tadeusz; Pyszczyński, Edmund (1975). Fordońska Dolina Śmierci (in Polish). Bydgoszcz: Urząd Miejski w Bydgoszczy.
- Kromp, Dorota; Minczykowska, Katarzyna (2008). Szyling, Jan (ed.). Wokół strat ludności pomorskiej w latach 1939–1945 (in Polish). Toruń: Fundacja Archiwum i Muzeum Pomorskie Armii Krajowej oraz Wojskowej Służby Polek. ISBN 978-83-88693-20-5.
- Miszewski, Bernard (2004). "Proces Stanisławy Koszcząb". Biuletyn IPN (in Polish). 12–1 (35–36).
- Schenk, Dieter (2002). Albert Forster. Gdański namiestnik Hitlera (in Polish). Gdańsk: Wydawnictwo Oskar. ISBN 83-86181-83-4.
- Semków, Piotr (2006). "Martyrologia Polaków z Pomorza Gdańskiego w latach II wojny światowej". Biuletyn IPN (in Polish). 8–9 (67–68).
- Wardzyńska, Maria (2009a). "Obozy niemieckie na okupowanych terenach polskich". Biuletyn IPN (in Polish). 4 (99).
- Wardzyńska, Maria (2009b). Był rok 1939. Operacja niemieckiej policji bezpieczeństwa w Polsce. Intelligenzaktion (in Polish). Warsaw: Instytut Pamięci Narodowej. ISBN 978-83-7629-063-8.
- Wilk, Henryk (2010). Historia parafii, kościoła św. Mikołaja i Fordonu (PDF) (in Polish). Parafia pw. św. Mikołaja w Bydgoszczy-Fordonie.
- Zarzycki, Edmund (2000). Działalność hitlerowskiego Sądu Specjalnego w Bydgoszczy w latach 1939–1945 (in Polish). Bydgoszcz: Bydgoskie Towarzystwo Naukowe. ISBN 83-901329-7-4.
- Zarzycki, Edmund (1976). Działalność hitlerowskiego Sądu Specjalnego w Bydgoszczy w sprawach o wypadki z września 1939 roku (in Polish). Warsaw – Poznań: Państwowe Wydawnictwo Naukowe.
- "Eksterminacja ludności polskiej w Bydgoszczy w początkowym okresie okupacji". Szlaki Pamięci (in Polish). Archived from the original on 2012-03-04.
- "Kalwaria Bydgoska – Golgota XX Wieku". Dolina Śmierci (in Polish). Archived from the original on 2016-03-05.
