= Lothar Beutel =

German military officer (1902–1986)

- Born: 6 May 1902; Leipzig, German Empire
- Died: 16 May 1986 (aged 84); Berlin-Steglitz, West Germany
- Military career
- Allegiance: Weimar Republic; Nazi Germany
- Branch: Reichswehr; Schutzstaffel
- Service years: 1921–23 (Germany); 1930–45 (SS)
- Rank: SS-Brigadeführer
- Service number: Nazi Party #135,238
- Commands: Einsatzgruppe IV

Lothar Beutel (6 May 1902 – 16 May 1986) was a German pharmacist by profession and Schutzstaffel (SS) officer in World War II serving on behalf of the Sicherheitsdienst (SD) branch of the SS.

== Biography ==
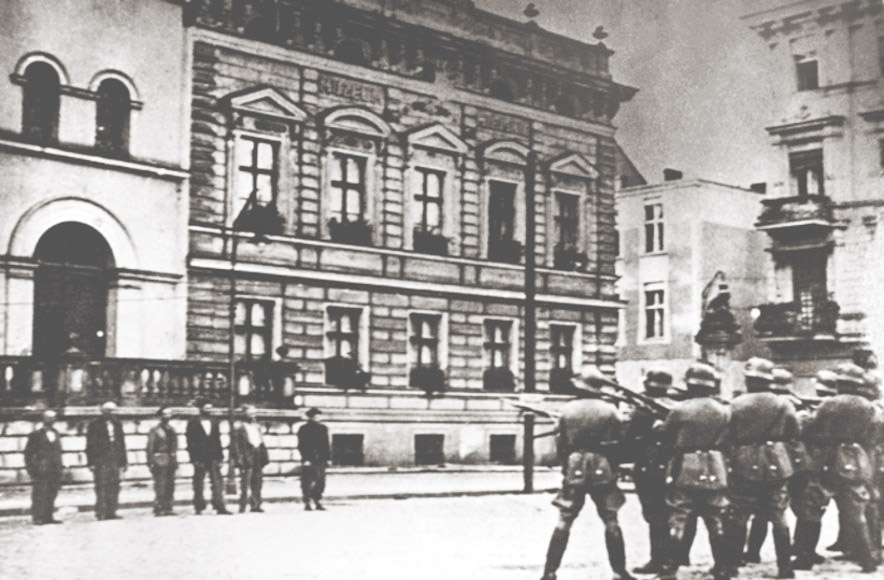
Einsatzgruppe IV execution of Polish hostages at the Bydgoszcz town square on 9 September 1939

Born in Leipzig in 1902, Beutel served as a volunteer in the Infantry Regiments 11 and 38 from 1921 to 1923 while studying pharmacy, economy and art history, finishing his degree in Chemnitz, Saxony.

Beutel originally joined the 'Orgesch' (from 'Organisation Escherich), an antisemitic paramilitary group, and, later, the Nazi Party in June 1929. In May 1930 he joined the Schutzstaffel (SS). From 1933 to 1938 he was in charge of the Sicherheitsdienst for south east Germany, based in Leipzig. At the same time, since 1933, he was also the assistant Reichsapothekerführer, the head of the national Nazi-controlled association of pharmacists.

Beutel was involved in the Night of the Long Knives, the 1934 purge of the SA, leading a death squad in Saxony. From 1937 to 1939 Beutel commanded the Bavarian branch of the Gestapo.

He was drafted to the Waffen-SS on 28 August 1939, during the Nazi invasion of Poland. By then an SS-Brigadeführer, Beutel commanded Einsatzgruppe IV. In this position Beutel organised the initial capture of Warsaw's Jewish population and set in motion their ghettoization. Beutel was also active in Bydgoszcz where he personally ordered a number of mass shootings including the murder of around 120–150 Poles taken to nearby woods and shot on 11 and 12 September 1939. This figure is given as 900 by another source.

Criminal police (Kripo) commander Arthur Nebe ordered that Beutel, who quickly became noted for his corruption, be investigated for the rape of a Polish girl whose mother cooked for the SS. By mid-October 1939 Beutel had been replaced as Einsatzgruppe IV chief by Josef Albert Meisinger.

Beutel was arrested on charges of embezzlement and for living with a Jewish woman and spent four weeks in Dachau concentration camp. He was demoted in rank in October 1939 and lost his SS membership. He subsequently served in a penal unit of the SS-Totenkopfdivision in France before returning to civilian life, working as a pharmacist again. Beutel was once more drafted into the Waffen-SS in 1944 and wounded and captured by Soviet forces in Hungary.

Beutel spent the next ten years as a prisoner of war, before being released in October 1955. He returned to his profession of pharmacist, living in West Berlin. Beutel was arrested in May 1965, and released on bail in 1967. In 1971, charges were dropped against him due to a lack of evidence. He died in West Berlin in 1986.
