= Borówno Lake =

Lake in Poland

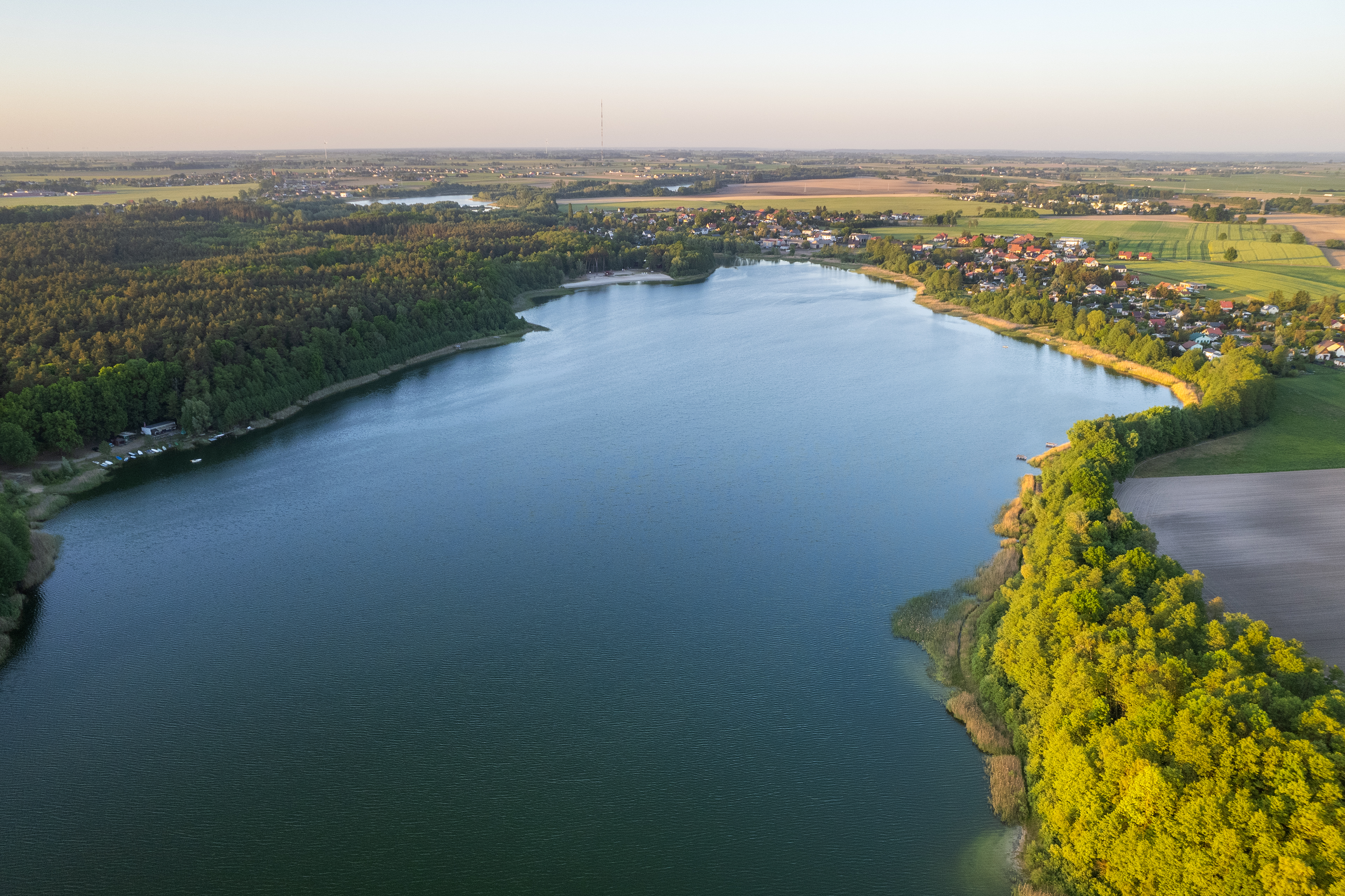
- Drone view
- Interactive map of Borówno Lake
- Location: Gmina Dobrcz, Poland
- Coordinates: 53°14′06″N 18°07′27″E
- Max. length: 1.48 km (0.92 mi)
- Max. width: 0.47 km (0.29 mi)
- Surface area: 0.44 km (0.27 mi)
- Average depth: 7.5 m (25 ft)
- Max. depth: 14.1 m (46 ft)
- Water volume: 0.0033056 km^{3} (0.0007931 cu mi)
- Shore length^{1}: 3.96 km (2.46 mi)
- ^{1} Shore length is not a well-defined measure.

Borówno Lake is a reservoir lake located in the Kuyavian–Pomeranian Voivodeship, on the Świecka Upland, in the Bydgoszcz County, in Gmina Dobrcz, approximately 9 km north of the city limits of Bydgoszcz.

== Description ==
The lake has an oval shape. A forest complex adjoins it from the northwest, while on the eastern shore, there is a complex of holiday homes. To the south lies the village of Borówno, from which the lake takes its name. In the forest adjacent to the north, there is the Augustowo nature reserve, protecting a peatland, alder carr, and a habitat of swamp willow. Two similar lakes, Kusowo and Dobrcz, connect to the north of the lake.

The lake basin has a regular shape sloping towards the center, with one central depression measuring 14 m in depth. The lake bed surface below the 12.5-meter isobath constitutes 21% of the total lake area. Small and shallow bays have formed at both ends of the lake. The total length of the shoreline is 3.96 km.

The littoral zone of the lake occupies 38% of the entire reservoir area. The marginal bays are entirely covered with stonewort meadows. Common stonewort dominates, accompanied to a lesser extent by species such as Eurasian watermilfoil, lesser bulrush, and Charetum fragilis.

== Drainage basin ==
The lake is fed by small, intermittent watercourses and essentially constitutes a closed basin, strongly reacting (along with the neighboring reservoirs of Kusowo and Dobrcz) to changes in rainfall conditions. Therefore, in 1978, an artificial drainage system was built for the lake, which, through a pumping station, can divert excess water to the Augustowski stream. However, due to the usually low water levels in the lake, this system is rarely utilized.

The direct drainage basin of the lake coincides with the total drainage basin, covering an area of 19.43 km^{2}. Its area encompasses the bifurcation part of the post-glacial tunnel valley, running northeast to southwest. Its western part is drained by the Augustowski stream, which flows into the Kotomierzyca river, a left-bank tributary of the Brda river, while in its northeastern fragment, the Niewieściński stream, which flows into the Vistula river, begins its course. The land use structure of the drainage basin is as follows:

- agricultural land: 71% of the total drainage basin;
- forests: 19%;
- other 10% (mostly marshes and floodplains near lakes Kusowo and Dobrcz).

The total drainage basin of the lake includes two water reservoirs: Kusowo Lake (48 ha), Dobrcz Lake (24 ha), and an accompanying floodplain covering an area of 24 ha.

The waters of Borówno Lake have limited hydraulic contact with groundwater, resulting in groundwater recharge contributing only a small percentage to the overall water balance of the reservoir.

The direct drainage basin of the lake is characterized by numerous recreational buildings in the form of a complex of 350 allotment gardens, which constitute a significant source of anthropogenic pressure.

== Water quality ==
Borówno Lake is characterized by average, second-degree susceptibility of waters to degradation. Unfavorable features of the lake's drainage basin include land use dominated by agriculture and a low elongation index value, indicating weak dilution capacity of pollutants from outside sources.

Water stratification amounts to 11.3%, suggesting favorable conditions for the development of high primary production. This facilitates the entry of nutrients into the eutrophic zone of the lake. This is also favored by the existence of prolonged anaerobic conditions.

Water quality studies of the lake have been conducted since 1984. In 1986 and 1992, the water was classified as Class II purity, although subsequent studies showed a gradual deterioration in water quality. A study from 2002 recorded Class III water purity. Against this background, the trophic indicators of the lake were favorable, such as water transparency (about 2.5 m, and over 3 m in summer) and chlorophyll content. Cesspits located in allotment gardens on the eastern shore of the lake have a negative impact on the water quality of Borówno Lake. A study conducted in 2009 by the Provincial Inspectorate of Environmental Protection in Bydgoszcz showed good water quality in the reservoir.

Trophically, the lake belongs to the transitional meso-eutrophic type.

== Fishing ==
The Polish Fishing Association is the lessee of Borówno Lake. The fishing management is conducted in a manner characteristic of tourist-utilized lakes. Only controlled catches are carried out on this body of water, targeting common bream, common roach, and European perch.

== Recreation ==
Borówno Lake is one of the two closest recreational areas to the city of Bydgoszcz, thus serving important recreational functions for its residents. It is estimated that during the summer season, on weekends, around 5,000 to 6,000 people relax by its shores. Access from the city side is convenient via the national road 5 Bydgoszcz-Gdańsk. It is the nearest recreational lake for the residents of the Fordon district.

On the eastern side of the reservoir, there are recreational plots, while on the western, wooded shore, there are two beaches (one guarded), along with piers, playgrounds, and a water sports equipment rental. There is also a recreational center and camping areas. Wild beaches also exist on the southern, northern, and eastern shores of the reservoir.

The history of the urban swimming area by the lake dates back to 1968. The center near the village of Borówno expanded the Municipal Sports, Tourism, and Recreation Center, while further south, a center belonging to the Pomeranian Military District was established. These centers were expanded in the 1970s, and after 1990, they were renovated and modernized.

== Gallery ==
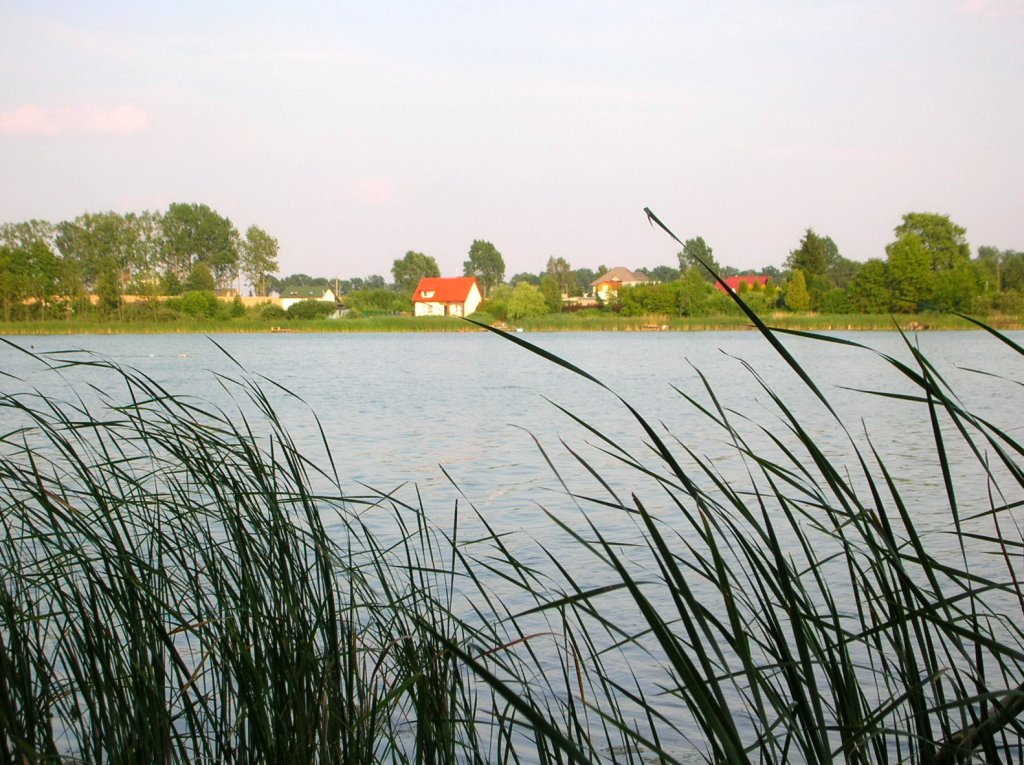
View of the eastern shore

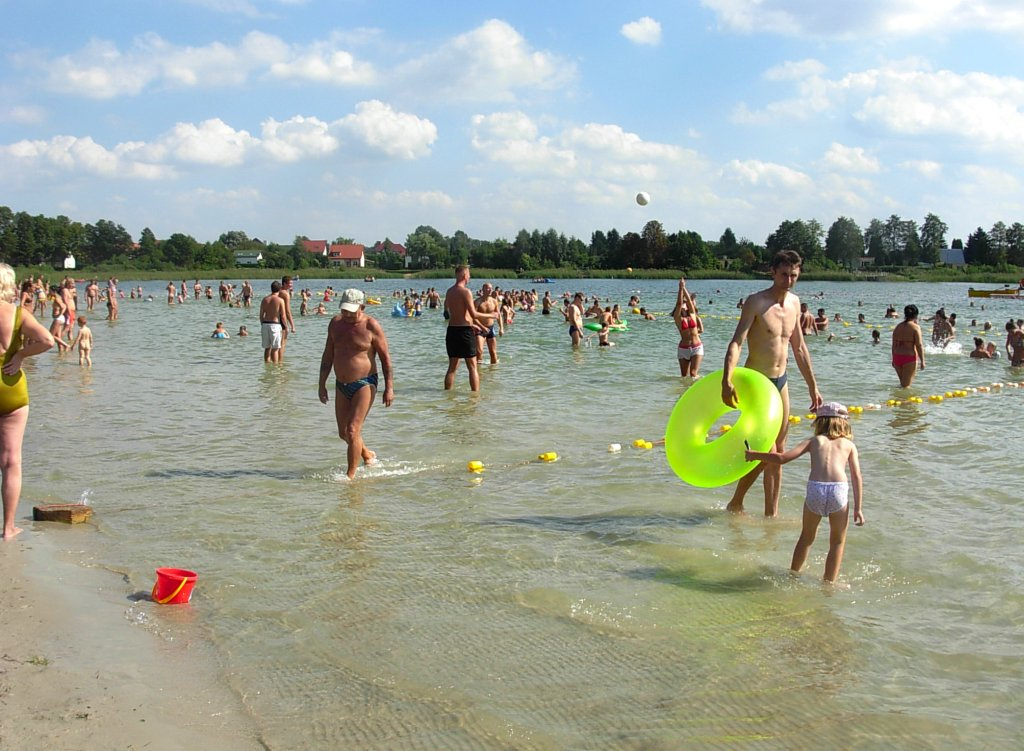
Swimming area

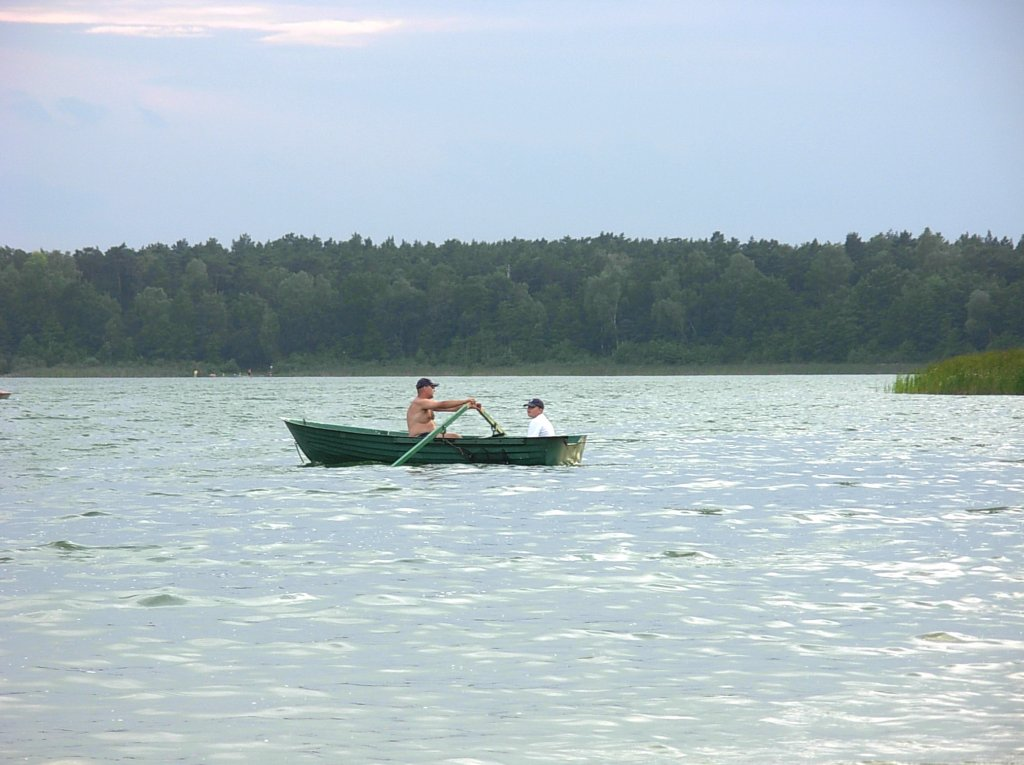

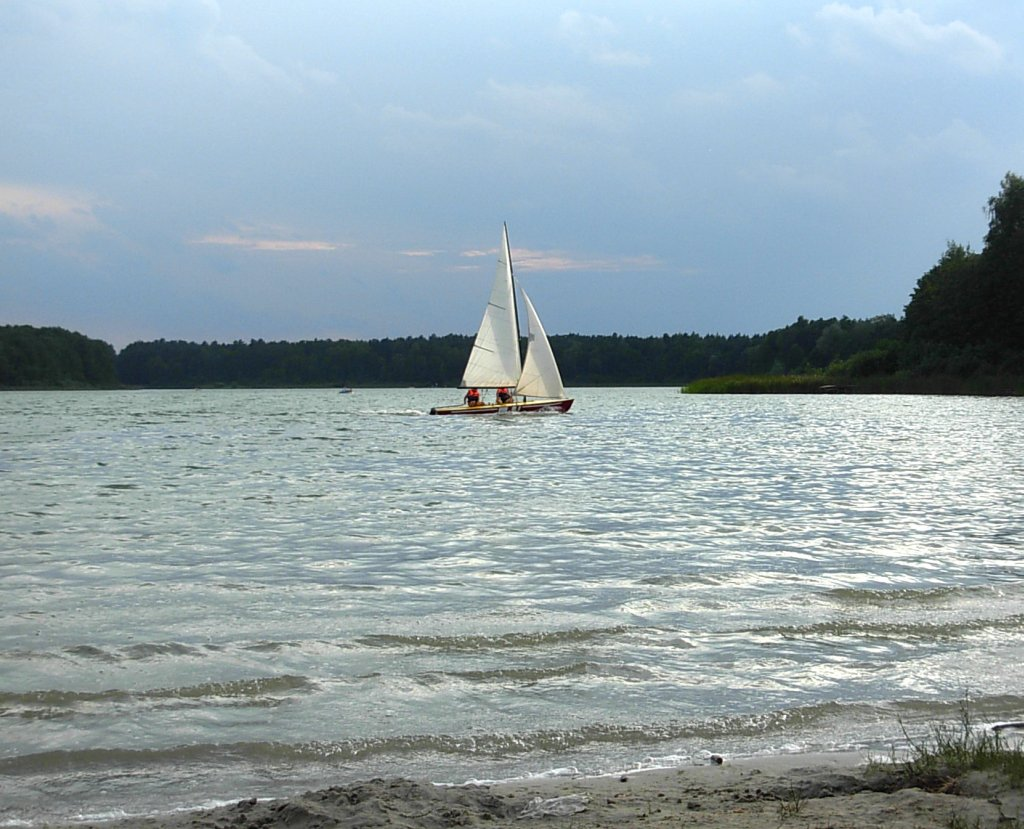

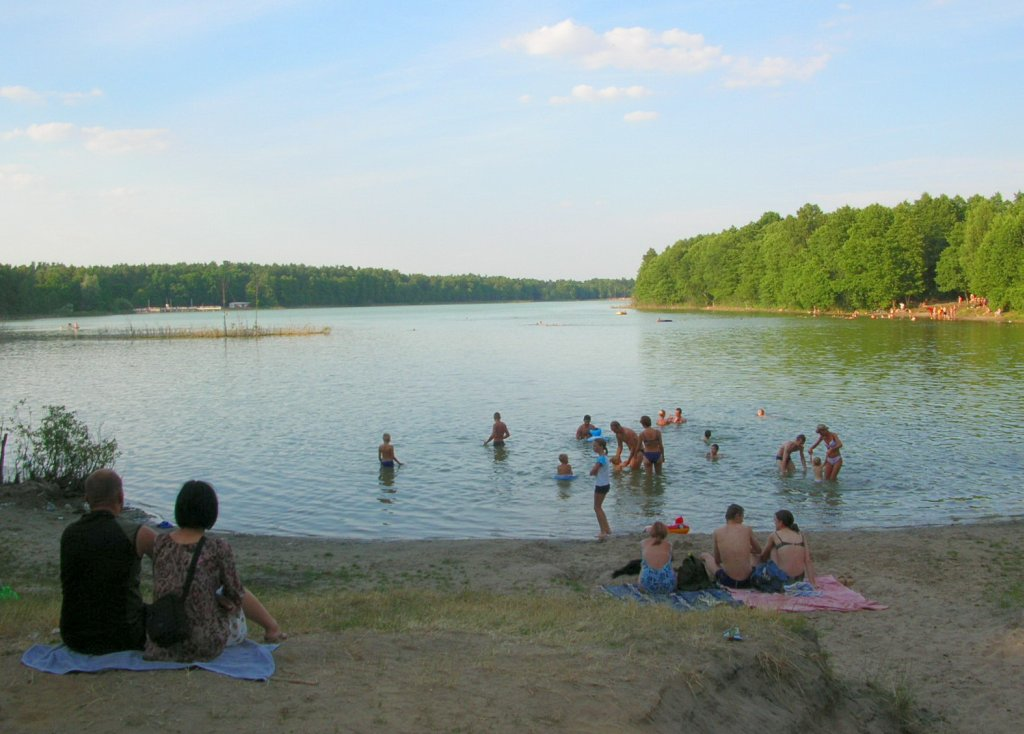
Southern bay

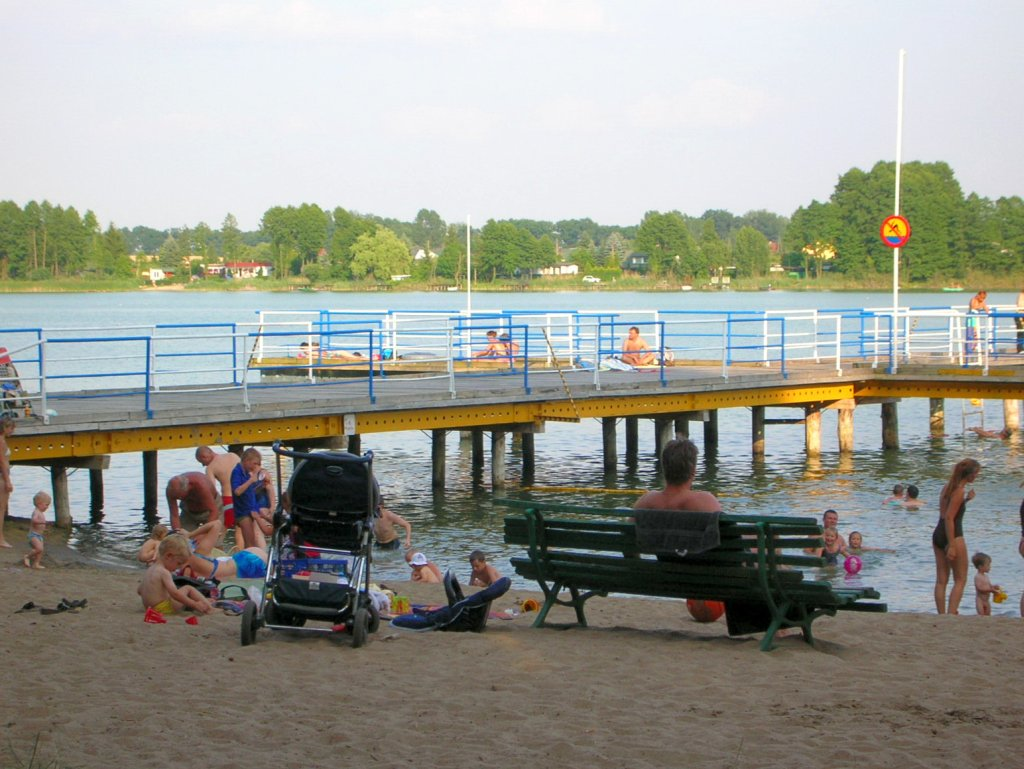
Beach

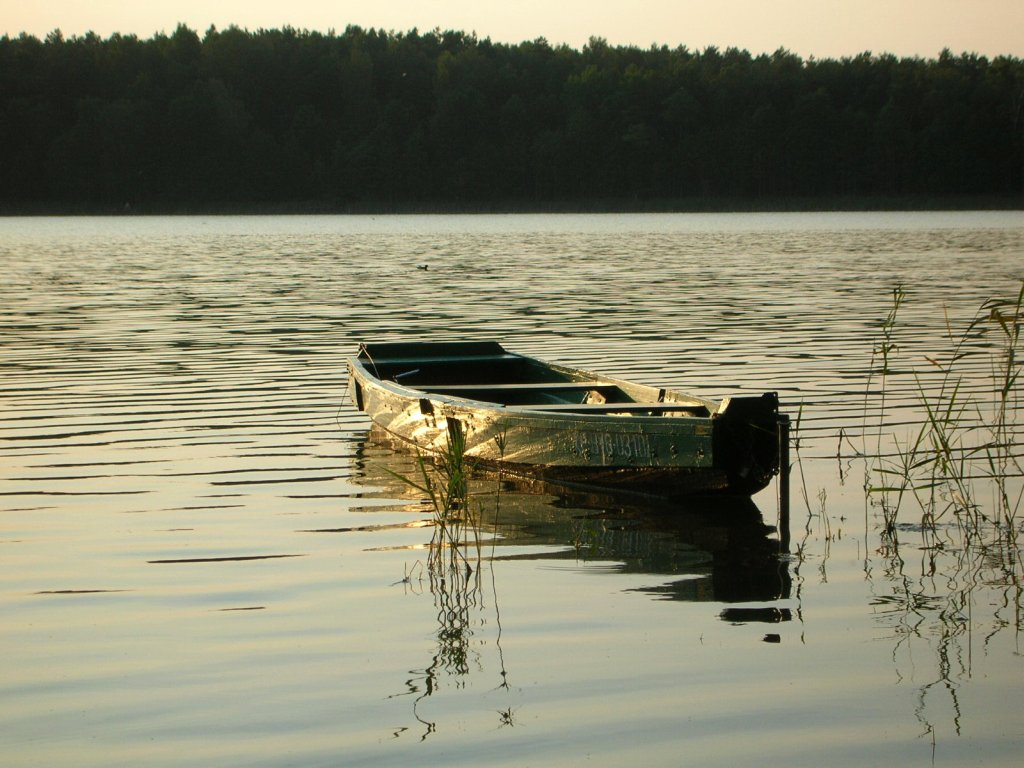

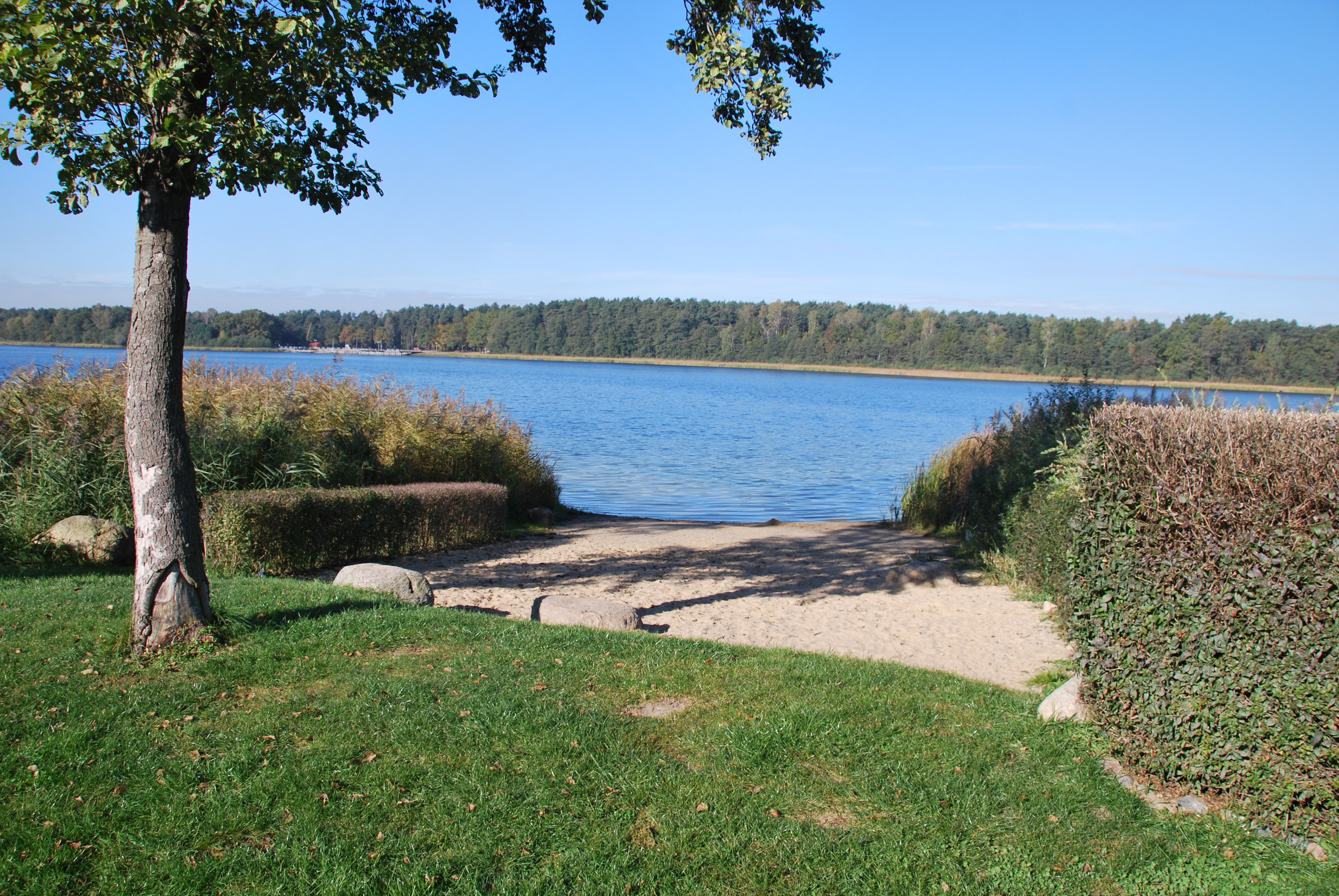
Western shore
