= Borówno, Bydgoszcz County =

Borówno
- Village
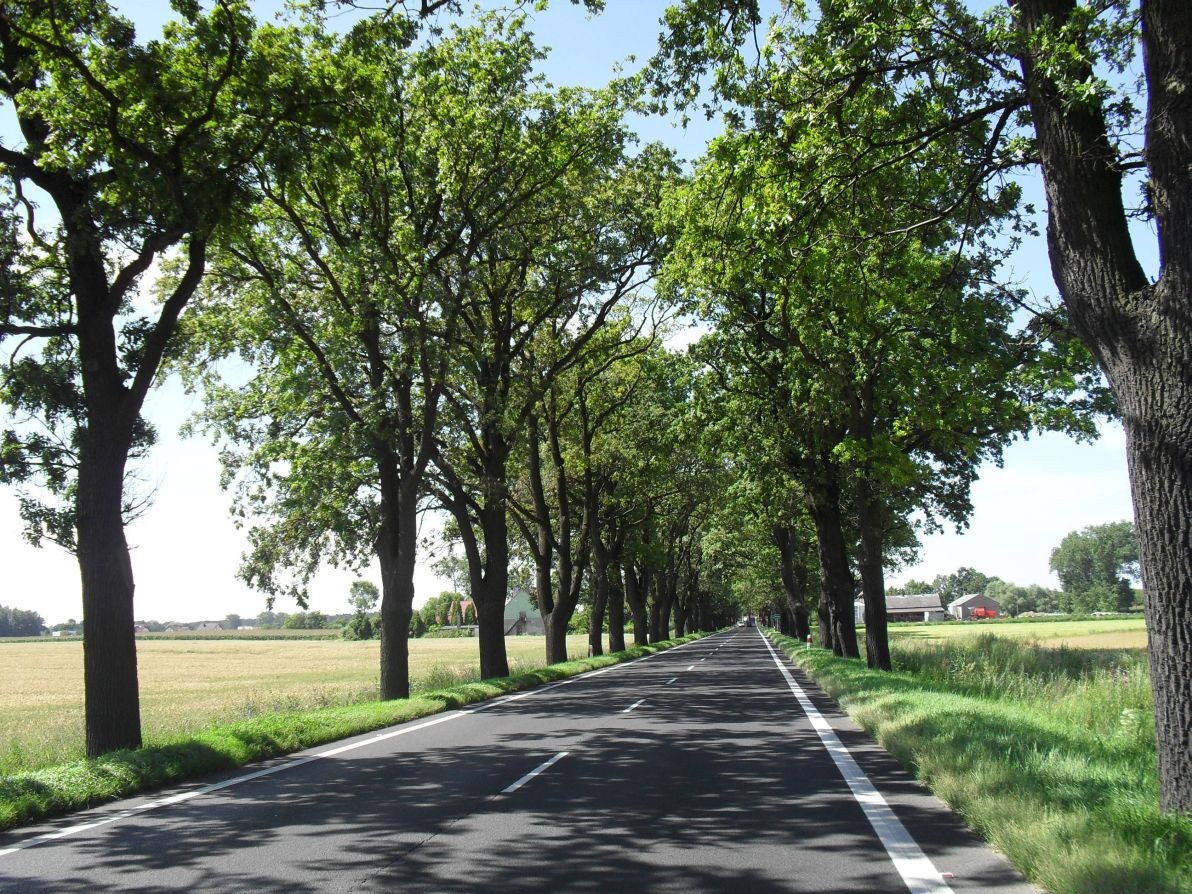

- Location within Poland
- Coordinates: 53°14′N 18°9′E
- Country: Poland
- Voivodeship: Kuyavian-Pomeranian
- County: Bydgoszcz
- Gmina: Dobrcz
- Time zone: UTC+1 (CET)
  - Summer (DST): UTC+2 (CEST)
- Vehicle registration: CBY

Borówno [bɔˈruvnɔ] is a village in the administrative district of Gmina Dobrcz, within Bydgoszcz County, Kuyavian-Pomeranian Voivodeship, in north-central Poland. It is located in the historic region of Kuyavia.

Borówno was a private village of Polish nobility, administratively located in the Bydgoszcz County in the Inowrocław Voivodeship in the Greater Poland Province of the Kingdom of Poland.
