= 62nd Infantry Regiment (Poland) =

Unit of the Greater Poland Army and the Polish Armed Forces

- 62 pułk piechoty
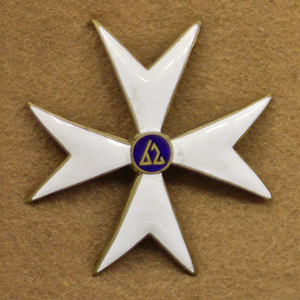
- Active: 1919–1939
- Country: Poland
- Allegiance: 15th Infantry Division
- Type: infantry
- Garrison/HQ: Bydgoszcz Garrison
- Anniversaries: August 21; April 26
- Engagements: Greater Poland uprising (1918–1919); Polish–Soviet War; Invasion of Poland

Commanders
- First commander: Lieutenant Ludwik Bociański
- Last commander: Lieutenant Colonel Kazimierz Heilman-Rawicz

The 62nd Infantry Regiment was a unit of the Greater Poland Army and the Polish Armed Forces. It was established in 1919 during the period of Poland's independence after World War I.

Initially formed from veterans of the Greater Poland Uprising, the regiment was stationed in the city of Bydgoszcz. The regiment played a significant role in the Polish–Soviet War, participating in key battles such as those at Warsaw and the Polish defensive line in 1920. It was also involved in various military and administrative actions throughout the interwar period. As the German invasion of Poland began on 1 September 1939, the regiment was engaged in defensive actions in the Bydgoszcz region. It faced heavy combat during the Battle of the Bzura before being forced to retreat.

The regiment was tragically affected by the Katyn massacre during World War II, with many of its soldiers falling victim to Soviet executions.

== Formation and organizational changes ==
The 8th Greater Poland Rifle Regiment was formed in March 1919 during the Greater Poland uprising. It was created from volunteer units fighting on the front lines, drawn from Pleszew and Środa Wielkopolska, as well as the reserve battalion of the 12th Rifle Regiment. Some of its soldiers had been involved in combat since the beginning of the uprising in Poznań on 27 December 1918.

On 17 January 1920, following the integration of the Greater Poland Army into the structures of the Polish Armed Forces, the regiment was renumbered as the "62nd Infantry Regiment". On 20 January 1920, in accordance with the provisions of the Treaty of Versailles, the regiment entered Bydgoszcz.

Subsequently, the regiment participated in the Polish–Soviet War, engaging in significant battles such as the fight for Berdychiv and achieving independent victories in battles near Glinianka and Zambrów. The anniversary of the fight for Zambrów, celebrated on 26 April, was designated as the regiment's official holiday.

In December 1919, the regiment's reserve battalion was stationed in Wągrowiec.

== Regiment in border conflicts ==
On 25 April 1920, the 15th Infantry Division, concentrated along the Sluch river, began an assault. The division marched along both sides of the Shepetivka-Polonne-Berdychiv-Koziatyn railway line. The right wing was formed by General Anatol Kędzierski's group, which included the 61st and 62nd Infantry Regiments. This group was tasked with advancing toward Berdychiv. On 26 April, the Greater Poland regiments approached Berdychiv and attacked the railway station, which was defended by units of the 44th Rifle Division. The resistance was quickly broken, and by evening, the entire city was under Polish control.

After securing Berdychiv, the 62nd Infantry Regiment advanced through Koziatyn towards Pykowec. Near Pastuchy, the regiment cut off the retreat of a Soviet supply column, which had been escorting the 44th Rifle Division's retreating forces from Berdychiv. After a brief exchange of fire, the demoralized Soviet soldiers surrendered their weapons.

On 17 August, General Władysław Jung, commander of the 15th Infantry Division, ordered the 62nd Infantry Regiment to reinforce with the 5th Battery of the 15th Greater Poland Light Artillery Regiment and reposition to Glinianka. The lead unit, the 1st Battalion under Lieutenant Teofil Lorek, reached Glinianka by evening. His 3rd Company secured the camp, and the rest of the battalion took up quarters in the village. At around 10:00 PM, Soviet forces, retreating from Warsaw, launched a surprise attack on the village. The 1st Battalion was pushed out of Glinianka, losing their entire convoy and two machine guns.

After regrouping, the battalion commander led a counterattack and recaptured the village. During the assault, Sergeant Jan Koper and four privates were killed. An hour later, another Soviet attack was launched from the Glinianka manor, and the Polish forces were again driven out. Lieutenant Lorek, with his remaining forces, decided to bypass the village from the south and rejoin the main regiment. A group of infantrymen from various units remained behind, taking positions to the north of Glinianka, where they used machine guns to engage the enemy.

Meanwhile, the 2nd and 3rd Battalions of the 62nd Infantry Regiment were stalled by fire coming from the Glinianka manor. Colonel Władysław Grabowski, the regimental commander, ordered an immediate assault on Glinianka with the 3rd Battalion and two companies from the 2nd Battalion. He also reinforced the 1st Battalion with a reconnaissance unit. Near Wola Karczewska, Lieutenant Lorek's battalion attacked a Soviet cavalry unit, scattering them and inflicting heavy losses.

At dawn on 18 August, the main forces of the 62nd Infantry Regiment launched an attack on Glinianka from the west. The assault was preceded by an artillery barrage from 19 machine guns and 5 batteries of the 15th Field Artillery Regiment, directed by Second Lieutenant Stefan Eitner. The 3rd Battalion, led by Lieutenant Kazimierz Szcześniak, was the first to strike. Taking advantage of the confusion among the enemy, Lieutenant Lorek's 1st Battalion attacked the manor from the south. Surprised by the two-pronged attack, the Soviets offered weak resistance, and after a bayonet charge, the Poles captured the manor and the nearby battery. As the enemy began surrendering en masse, the 4th Company, which had been securing the assault, completed the encirclement, allowing only a few Soviet soldiers to escape from the trap.

=== Knights of Virtuti Militari ===
Recipients of the Silver Cross of the War Order of Virtuti Militari for actions between the years 1919 and 1920:

Rank	Name
Corporal	Julian Andjelewicz
Private	Leon Binek
Sergeant	Wacław Dąbkiewicz
Lieutenant	Stefan Eitner
Sergeant	Stanisław Frańczak
Second Lieutenant	Marian Głowacki
Colonel	Władysław Grabowski
Corporal	Stanisław Gryborczyk
Private	Stanisław Jordanowski
Lieutenant	Adam Kowalczyk
Second Lieutenant	Kazimierz Kwieciński
Captain	Teofil Lorek
Second Lieutenant	Stefan Mrozek
Lieutenant	Edward Pawłowski
Lieutenant	Stanisław Piękny
Corporal	Franciszek Sakwiński
Lieutenant	Maksymilian Sikorski
Lieutenant	Kazimierz Szcześniak
Second Lieutenant	Jan Sławiński
Private	Franciszek Wasilewski

== Regiment in peacetime ==
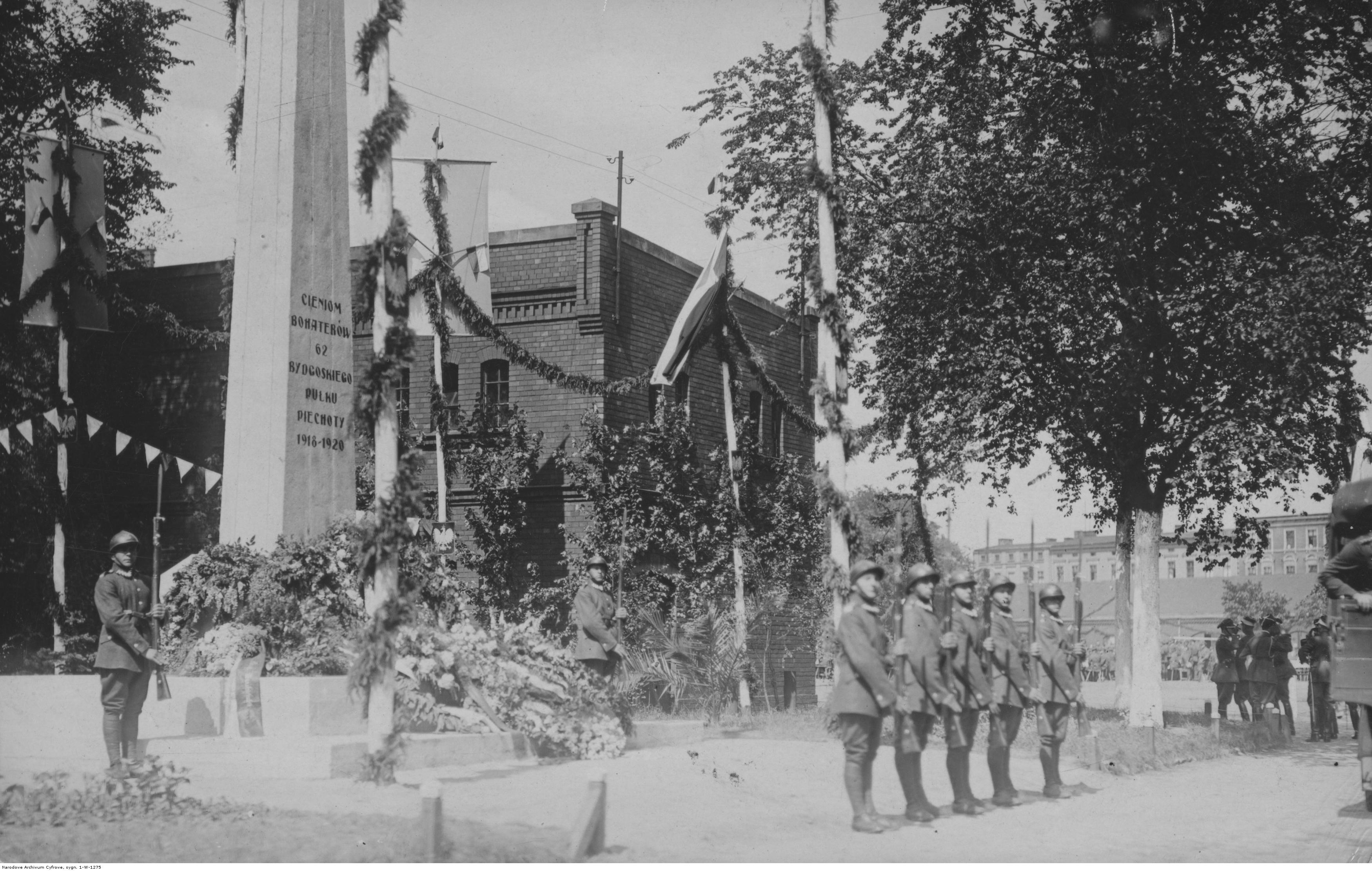
Unveiling of the monument honoring the fallen soldiers of the 62nd Infantry Regiment in Bydgoszcz (1929)

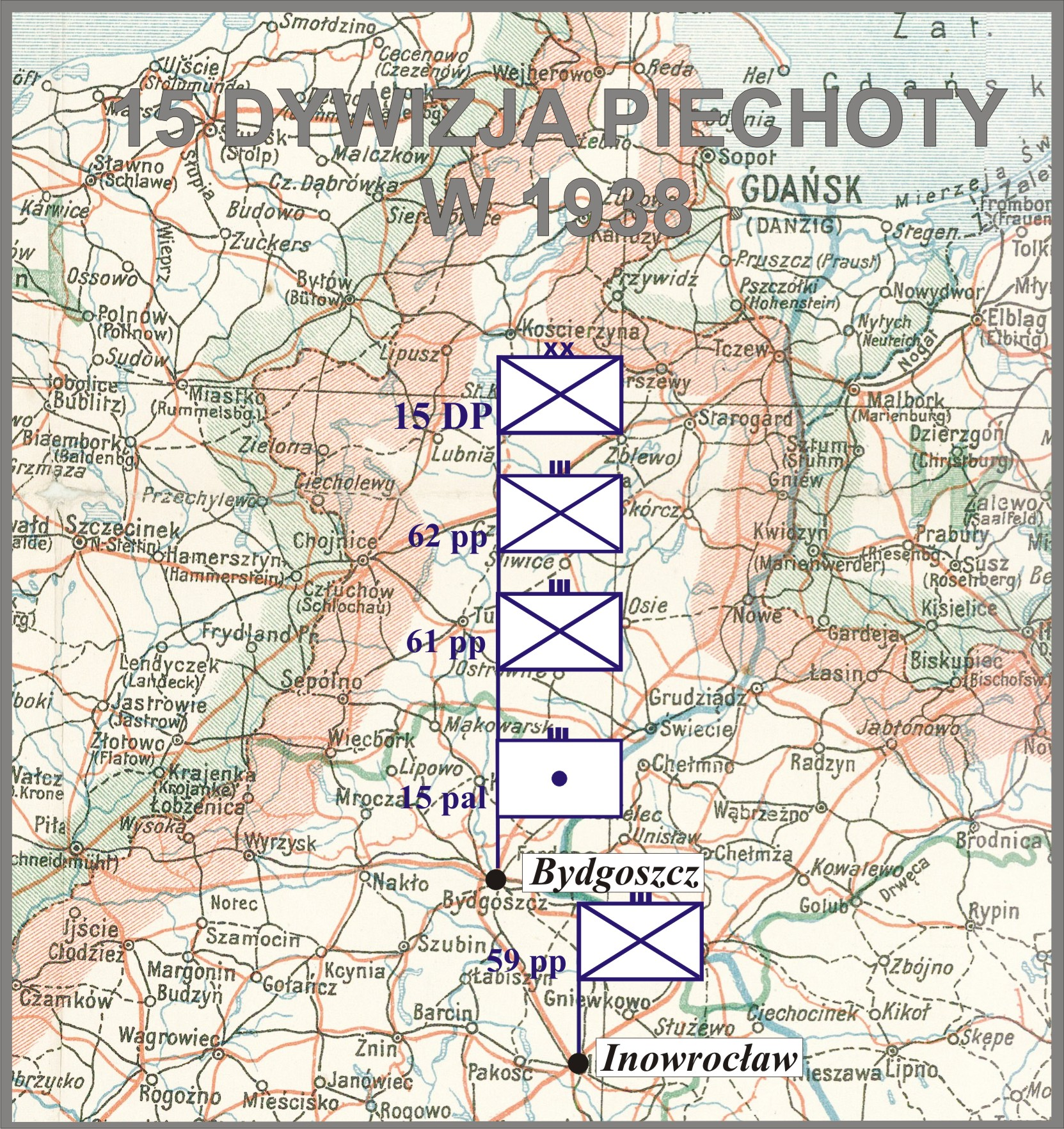
15th Infantry Division in 1938

From 24 January 1920, the regiment was stationed in the Bydgoszcz Garrison, in the barracks named after General Franciszek Rymkiewicz on Warszawska Street. It was part of the 15th Infantry Division.

On 17 April 1924, during grenade training at the Jachcice training grounds, a tragic accident occurred. A grenade held by Corporal Antoni Jóźwiak prematurely exploded. The non-commissioned officer died 10 minutes later due to his injuries.

On 19 May 1927, the Minister of Military Affairs, Marshal of Poland Józef Piłsudski, established and approved 21 August as the regiment's holiday. The regiment celebrated its holiday on the anniversary of the capture of Zambrów in 1920. The holiday was celebrated for the first time in 1921.

On 30 March 1936, at the regiment's request, the Minister of Military Affairs changed the regiment's holiday date from 21 August to 26 April, marking the anniversary of the Battle of Berdychiv fought in 1920. In 1936, due to national mourning, the regiment celebrated its holiday "internally". On the eve of the holiday, a plaque listing the names of all fallen soldiers was unveiled on the regiment's memorial in the barracks. The plaque was funded by reserve officers of the 62nd Infantry Regiment.

Based on the executive order from the Ministry of Military Affairs to the Infantry Department implementing the peacetime organization of infantry, PS 10-50, in 1930, the Polish Armed Forces introduced three types of infantry regiments. The 62nd Infantry Regiment was classified as a Type II infantry regiment (reinforced). Each year, it received approximately 845 recruits. The regiment's personnel consisted of 68 officers and 1,900 non-commissioned officers and privates. During wartime, it was designated for the first wave of mobilization. In winter, it had two battalions of older recruits and a training battalion, while in summer, it comprised three rifle battalions. Its personnel strength exceeded that of a "normal" (Type I) regiment by between 400 and 700 soldiers.

Personnel and organizational structure in March 1939
Position	Rank, name
Command and quartermaster
Regiment Commander	Lieutenant Colonel Kazimierz Roman Heilman
First Deputy Commander	Lieutenant Colonel Jan III Szewczyk
Adjutant	Captain Wojciech Adam Nowak
Senior Doctor	Major Doctor Julian Żyromski
Junior Doctor	Lieutenant Piotr Makarewicz
At the commander's disposal	Major Leon Makarewicz
Second Deputy Commander (Quartermaster)	Major Jan I Gawroński
Mobilization Officer	Captain Kazimierz Rogoziewicz
Deputy Mobilization Officer	Captain Tadeusz Romanowski
Administrative and Material Officer	Captain Roman Michoń
Economic Officer	Captain Stanisław Maruniak
Food Officer	Corporal Jan Drgas
Wagon Officer	Captain Władysław Lucjan Lindner
Bandmaster	Captain Stanisław IV Grabowski
Communications Platoon Commander	Captain Stanisław Stawski
Pioneer Platoon Commander	Lieutenant Stefan Tarno
Infantry Artillery Platoon Commander	Captain Artillery Henryk Jan Rysy
Anti-Tank Platoon Commander	Lieutenant Łukasz Konrad Ciepliński
Reconnaissance Unit Commander	Lieutenant Jan Stachowiak
1st battalion
Battalion Commander	Major Gustaw Sroczyński
1st Company Commander	Captain Jan Kozłowski
Platoon Commander	Lieutenant Brunon Józef Westphal
Platoon Commander	Lieutenant Władysław Bąkowski
2nd Company Commander	Captain Stefan Dońcew
Platoon Commander	Lieutenant Aleksander Ludwik Braciszewicz
Platoon Commander	Lieutenant Adam Marian Kosicki
3rd Company Commander	Lieutenant Jan Czesław Jeżewski
Platoon Commander	Lieutenant Jerzy Diaczyszyn
1st Machine Gun Company Commander	Captain Jan Antoni Murkociński
Platoon Commander	Lieutenant Zbigniew Hołyszewski
Platoon Commander	Lieutenant Kazimierz Piątkowski
2nd battalion
Battalion Commander	Major Wojciech Antoni Gniadek
4th Company Commander	Captain Romuald Aleksander Sokoliński
Platoon Commander	Lieutenant Fryderyk Leopold Fischer
Platoon Commander	Lieutenant Mieczysław Wieczorek
5th Company Commander	Captain Czesław Teofil Ciechoński
Platoon Commander	Lieutenant Gwidon Józef Hadrych
Platoon Commander	Lieutenant Władysław Witek
6th Company Commander	Captain Władysław Liniarski
Platoon Commander	Lieutenant Mieczysław Sylwester Łukasik
Platoon Commander	Lieutenant Ludwik Matuszewski
2nd Machine Gun Company Commander	Captain Bolesław Rassalski
Platoon Commander	Lieutenant Lucjan Kühn
3rd battalion
Battalion Commander	Lieutenant Colonel Stanisław Boehm
7th Company Commander	Captain Bronisław Brzeziński
Platoon Commander	Lieutenant Leon Szyjkowski
Platoon Commander	Lieutenant Ryszard Mieczysław Goc
Platoon Commander	Lieutenant Edmund Wiznerowicz
8th Company Commander	Lieutenant Kazimierz Bronisław Ortyl
Platoon Commander	Corporal Marian Dębosz
9th Company Commander	Captain Tadeusz Leopold Miedzianowski
Platoon Commander	Lieutenant Józef Andrzejewski
3rd Machine Gun Company Commander	Major Wojciech Krajewski
Platoon Commander	Lieutenant Kazimierz Stefan Orłowski
Platoon Commander	Lieutenant Lucjan Markiewicz
Attending course	Lieutenant Antoni Edward Pawecki
In hospital	Captain Józef II Drozd
15th Infantry Division Reserve Officer Training Course
Course Commander	Major Kazimierz Kruczkowski
Rifle Platoon Commander	Lieutenant Rudolf Franciszek Fischer
Rifle Platoon Commander	Lieutenant Aleksander Czesław Majorek
Rifle Platoon Commander	Lieutenant Józef Kwit (61st Infantry Regiment)
Machine Gun Platoon Commander	Lieutenant Ludwik Marian Diehl (61st Infantry Regiment)
62nd Military Service District "Kcynia"
District Commanding Officer	Major Infantry Władysław III Pawłowski
District Commander Kcynia	Captain (Infantry) Jan Kaperek
District Commander Szubin	Captain Infantry Michał Olisiewicz
District Commander Żnin	Captain (Infantry) Jan Curzytek
District Commander Chodzież	Captain (Infantry) Leon Wojtyniak
District Commander Wągrowiec	Captain Infantry Stefan Wałajtys

== 62nd Infantry Regiment in the September Campaign ==
=== Mobilization ===
In response to the growing political and military threat from Nazi Germany, on 23 March 1939, an alarm mobilization was ordered in designated units of the IX and partially of the IV Corps Districts. In the VIII Corps District, as a border region, combat readiness was also increased by calling up part of the reservists for additional exercises, which raised the personnel numbers of infantry units in the border areas. According to an order from the commander of the VIII Corps District, the personnel strengthening also applied to the 62nd Infantry Regiment and the entire 15th Infantry Division. The strengthening took place through a rotational call-up of reservists for several weeks of exercises. A "training" infantry battalion, a cavalry platoon, a pioneer platoon, an anti-tank platoon, and one infantry artillery section were organized based on wartime staff. By early April 1939, the 62nd Infantry Regiment mobilized the 2nd Infantry Battalion under the command of Major Wojciech Gniadek. On 27 April, the 2nd Battalion moved to the village of Mochle, where it undertook protective actions for the Bydgoszcz garrison. It conducted training and fortification work in the area. In July, as part of the rotational system for reservists, the full personnel required by wartime staffing standards was reached. In mid-May, the 1st Battalion of the regiment, under the command of Captain Jan Murkociński, was similarly mobilized as another training unit. In June, the 1st Battalion moved to the Tryszczyn area, where it also conducted training and fortification work.

On the morning of 24 August 1939, in Bydgoszcz, the 62nd Infantry Regiment began alarm mobilization in the blue group, resulting in the mobilization of:

- The 62nd Infantry Regiment in wartime organization and staffing, from A+18 to A+36.
- The command and special subunits of the 208th Infantry Regiment (quartermaster units, companies: administrative, reconnaissance, anti-tank type II, platoons: communications, pioneers, gas defense) based on the command of the Pomeranian National Defense Brigade, at A+40.
- In Kcynia, the command and part of the special infantry battalion unit 83 (platoons: scouts and pioneers, companies: 1st rifle and machine gun company), at A+24.
- In Szubin, the 2nd rifle company of infantry battalion type special 83, at A+18.
- In Chodzież, the 3rd rifle company of infantry battalion type special 83, at A+18.
- In Bydgoszcz:
  - The assistant company number 182, at A+44.
  - The cavalry company number 82, at A+44.
  - The independent machine gun and accompanying weapons company number 82, at A+48.

As part of the first wave of general mobilization, the following were mobilized by the deadline of 4:

- The 62nd Infantry Regiment march battalion
- Reinforcements for the independent machine gun and accompanying weapons company number 82
- Reinforcements for the cavalry company number 82

Upon the declaration of mobilization, by order of the commander of the 15th Infantry Division, Brigadier General Zdzisław Wincenty Przyjałkowski, both "training" battalions took up defensive positions along the Noteć Canal and in the areas of the villages of Pawłówek, Osówiec, and Szczutki. The battalions were to achieve full combat readiness, and reinforcements of personnel, weapons, and equipment, including anti-tank rifles, were sent to them. Missing horses and wagons were also provided. In the areas previously occupied, the mobilization process was completed. Captain Władysław Liniarski assumed command of the 1st Battalion. The mobilization of the 3rd Battalion took place at the school on Grunwaldzka Street, and on 27 August at 8:30 AM, the 3rd Battalion of the 62nd Infantry Regiment took the military oath. On the afternoon and evening of 27 August, the 62nd Infantry Regiment moved to assembly areas. On the morning of 28 August, it was positioned in waiting areas as follows:

- Regiment command in the Wtelno, Nowa Ruda, Wtelno farm area.
- 1st Battalion in Trzemiętówko, Piotrówka farm, Nowaczkowo, Chmielewo.
- 2nd Battalion in Mochle, Szczutki.
- 3rd Battalion in Sicienko, Wojnowo.

The regiment continued fortification work, training activities, and finishing organizational tasks. On the evening of 31 August, the 62nd Infantry Regiment left the waiting areas and took up defensive positions.

=== Combat operations ===
==== Defensive fighting in the Bydgoszcz area ====
At dawn on 1 September, the 62nd Infantry Regiment took defensive positions on the Bydgoszcz bridgehead's defensive line, with the following dispositions:

- The 3rd Battalion in the Trzemiętowo area,
- The 1st Battalion on the Trzemiętowo–Wtelno sector,
- The command with special subunits in Wtelno,
- The 2nd Battalion on the main defensive position of the Bydgoszcz bridgehead, from Szczutki to Tryszczyn.

Throughout the day, German reconnaissance patrols from the 50th Infantry Division appeared in front of the defensive line.

On the morning of 2 September, the reconnaissance company of the 62nd Infantry Regiment advanced towards Trzemiętowo, Gliszcz, and Samsieczno. At 11:00 AM, German aviation bombed the 62nd Infantry Regiment command post in the village of Wtelno. Due to a breakthrough in the Polish defense along the Bystrzyce Lakes, the commander of the 15th Infantry Division had to withdraw part of the 62nd Infantry Regiment from the fortified defensive position and relocate it to a weakly fortified area on the northern section of the Bydgoszcz bridgehead, to the right of the 61st Infantry Regiment's positions. In the afternoon, a German reconnaissance unit from the 122nd Infantry Regiment attacked the 3rd Battalion of the 62nd Infantry Regiment in the area of Wojnowo. The positions of the 8th and 9th Rifle Companies were shelled by German artillery, and a strong attack was launched against the 9th Rifle Company. The German assault was repelled, forcing the German troops to retreat towards Sicienko. At 7:15 PM, the 62nd Infantry Regiment, minus its battalion, received orders to occupy the section from 108.9 Hill through Tryszczyn to the southern edge of the forest near Łącznica.

From the morning of 3 September, the 62nd Infantry Regiment took up defensive positions as follows:

- The 2nd Battalion from 108.9 Hill through Szczutki to the Tryszczyn forest,
- The 1st Battalion from the Tryszczyn forest through Tryszczyn to the Brda river,
- The 3rd Battalion in reserve in the Łącznica and Bożenkowo areas,
- Regiment command in Smukala Górna.

Around 10:00 AM, an organized diversionary action began in Bydgoszcz aimed at disrupting the Polish defensive efforts. A battalion of the 62nd Infantry Regiment, under the command of Captain Aleksander Mamunow, was deployed against the saboteurs. At 10:30 AM, the German 123rd Infantry Regiment attacked the position of the 2nd Battalion of the 62nd Infantry Regiment from the Sicienko area. After the German screening forces were driven back, the main assault reached the vicinity of Mochle, where it was stopped by machine gun fire from the 2nd Battalion and artillery fire from the 3rd Battery of the 15th Light Artillery Regiment, forcing the Germans to retreat. The German forces left elements of their screening positions on the forward edge.

At 1:00 PM, the German 121st Infantry Regiment launched an attack from Wtelno, attempting to bypass Tryszczyn, cross the Brda river near Łącznica and Bożenkowo. The German flanking maneuver against the positions of the 1st Battalion of the 62nd Infantry Regiment came under frontal fire from the 2nd Battalion and flank fire from the 1st Battalion. Two subsequent German assaults by the 121st Infantry Regiment were similarly repelled by the combined fire of the two battalions of the 62nd Infantry Regiment and effective shelling from the 15th Light Artillery Regiment and the 15th Heavy Artillery Division.

In the evening, the German 121st Infantry Regiment attempted to attack the positions of the 62nd Infantry Regiment along the road from Koronowo to Bydgoszcz road. Effective fire from the 2nd and 3rd Divisions of the 15th Light Artillery Regiment and 15th Heavy Artillery Division destroyed the German columns as they regrouped along the road from Koronowo to Bydgoszcz near the village of Tryszczyn. The German infantry then assumed defensive positions in Wtelno.

In the afternoon, German forces broke through the weak defense of the 23rd Infantry Regiment of the 27th Infantry Division on the northern section of the Bydgoszcz Bridgehead. Fearing encirclement of the 15th Infantry Division and the 27th Infantry Division, the command of the Pomeranian Army ordered the regiment to withdraw during the night of 3–4 September from the Bydgoszcz bridgehead.

The 15th Infantry Division received orders to withdraw from the bridgehead and close the directions to Inowrocław and Solec Kujawski, establishing a defensive position along the southern bank of the Bydgoszcz Canal and Brda river, in the area between the Żółwin farm and the Noteć Canal. During the march, the passing units were fired upon by German saboteurs on the outskirts and within the city. On the night of 3–4 September, the 62nd Infantry Regiment conducted a march through Tryszczyn, Opławiec, Czyżnówko, and the Koronowo Bridge. The regiment began its withdrawal from the front lines at 9:00 PM, marching through the city. The 2nd Battalion engaged in combat with German saboteurs during the march, destroying saboteur groups near Koronowska Street and the Evangelical Church in Szwederowo. The 3rd Battalion marched through Bydgoszcz along Grunwaldzka Street, New Market, Grain Market, and Kujawska Street, frequently coming under fire from German saboteurs.

By the morning of 4 September, the 62nd Infantry Regiment took up defensive positions along the Brda river, from the junction with the 1st Battalion of the 61st Infantry Regiment to the Bartodzieje area. The individual battalions of the regiment assumed defensive positions as follows:

- The 1st Battalion from the officers' casino of the 62nd Infantry Regiment on Focha Street to the church on Toruńska Street in Bartodzieje,
- The 3rd Battalion from the casino to the 4th lock on the Brda River,
- The 2nd Battalion in the Szwederowo-Dąbrowski Hill defense area, tasked with guarding the bridges over the Brda river in central Bydgoszcz.

Regiment command was stationed in the Bielice forest.

In the afternoon, the commander of the 15th Infantry Division received orders from the army commander to withdraw the division to a defensive perimeter outside Bydgoszcz, covering the Solec Kujawski–Jezuickie Lake line. The division's task was to defend the area from Łęgnowo to Jezuickie Lake, Kobylarnia, and the Noteć Canal. The defense sector was divided into sections. The 62nd Infantry Regiment reorganized during the night of 4–5 September and occupied the "Middle" sector. To man this section, units of the 6th Machine Gun Battalion and the 15th Anti-Tank Battalion were incorporated, including two machine gun and anti-tank companies, a rifle company, a sapper company from the 15th Sapper Battalion, and the 3rd Battery of the 15th Light Artillery Regiment. The commander of the sector was appointed to be the Chief of Staff of the 15th Infantry Division, Lieutenant Colonel Józef Drotlew.

From the morning of 5 September, the 15th Infantry Division began organizing its defensive positions within its sector. The 62nd Infantry Regiment took up positions as follows:

- The 1st Battalion in the Emilianowo area, along the section of the road from Bydgoszcz to Wypaleniska, and the hills by Jezuickie Lake,
- The 2nd Battalion in the Piecki–Łążyn sector,
- The 3rd Battalion in the second line behind the 2nd Battalion.

On the forward edge of the 2nd Battalion's position, the 2nd Machine Gun Company (without its platoon) from the 6th Machine Gun and Anti-Tank Battalion took up defensive positions on the edge of the Kujawski forest. The regiment's command was stationed in the western part of Łążyn. The 3rd Battery of the 15th Light Artillery Regiment took up firing positions on the edge of a forest clearing near the village of Kabat.

On the orders of the 62nd Infantry Regiment commander, the commander of the 3rd Battalion sent out a reconnaissance unit on the night of 5–6 September to determine the German forces on the regiment's forward positions. The reconnaissance detachment, in the Bilica–Nowa Rupnica area, encountered German forces after emerging from the forest and came under heavy machine gun fire. During the clash, the commander of the 9th Rifle Company, 2nd Lieutenant Augustyn Westphal, was killed. The detachment withdrew to its starting positions.

On 6 September, from the early morning hours, the German 50th Infantry Division launched an assault on the positions of the 15th Infantry Division. On the "Middle" sector, the German 122nd Infantry Regiment attacked the positions of the 62nd Infantry Regiment but was effectively delayed by the advanced subunits and posts. At 3:00 PM, effective shelling by nine howitzer batteries from the 15th Light Artillery Regiment in the Piecki area delayed the advance of the German forward guard. At 4:00 PM, the German assault reached the positions of the 1st Battalion from the Emilianowo area. Initially, the Germans, using the wooded terrain, broke through to the positions of the 1st Battalion. A decisive counterattack by the 3rd Rifle Company with a machine gun platoon at 5:00 PM pushed the German infantry back.

Throughout the evening, the first-echelon battalions successfully repelled the German assaults. After dark, in order to facilitate the orderly withdrawal of the 1st and 2nd Battalions, the reserve 8th Rifle Company launched an attack on the German positions before retreating to its starting positions.

==== Retreat battles in Kuyavia ====
For the second time, during the night of 6–7 September, on the orders of the Pomeranian Army's commander, General Władysław Bortnowski, the 15th Infantry Division withdrew from the enemy and moved along the left bank of the Vistula river towards Sochaczew and Warsaw. The division's route passed through Dąbrowa Wielka, Gniewkowiec, Broniewo, Rojewo, Płonkowo, reaching the area near Gniewkowo by the afternoon of 7 September. The 62nd Infantry Regiment halted for rest, with the 1st Battalion stationed at Ostrowo Manor, the 2nd Battalion at the Lipie settlement, and the 3rd Battalion in the town of Gniewkowo. The regiment's command set up camp in Bobolin. The regiment was joined by its march battalion, which was incorporated into the existing battalions. During the night of 7–8 September, the 62nd Infantry Regiment, as part of its parent division, continued its march towards Radziejów Kujawski and Brześć Kujawski. Due to significant congestion on the roads, the division did not reach the area of the Parchany Canal and Bachorza until the morning of 8 September. The 62nd Infantry Regiment reconnaissance company explored the Walentynów area.

The 62nd Infantry Regiment established defensive positions near Dąbrowa Biskupia, with the 1st Battalion taking the western part of Dąbrowa Biskupia, the 2nd Battalion in Chlewiska, and the 3rd Battalion in the villages of Chróstowo and Przybysław. The regiment's command, along with its special detachments, was stationed in Walentynów. Due to the preparations of the Poznań Army and part of Pomeranian Army for offensive actions along the Bzura river, some of Pomeranian Army's forces, including the 15th Infantry Division, were assigned to protect the rear of the forces fighting along the Bzura.

According to further orders, during the night of 8–9 September, the 62nd Infantry Regiment, reinforced by the 3rd Battery of the 15th Light Artillery Regiment and the 15th Motorized Anti-Aircraft Battery, began marching in three battalion columns:

- The 1st column via Zakrzewo, Bachorza, Człopin, the Nagórki estate, and Kościelna Wieś.
- The 2nd column via Zagajewice, Miechowice, and Jądrowice.
- The 3rd column via Sądzin, Dęby, Ułomie, Byczynę, Pilichowo, Osięciny, and Redecz Krukowy.

The reconnaissance company continued to probe towards Radziejów Kujawski. On the morning of 9 September, the 15th Infantry Division took up positions in the Brześć Kujawski–Lubraniec area. The 62nd Infantry Regiment, supported by the 3rd Battery of the 15th Light Artillery Regiment and the 82nd Independent Machine Gun and Anti-Tank Company, defended the Kąkowa Wola–Redecz Kalny sector. The 1st Battalion defended Redecz Kalny, the 2nd Battalion Kąkowa Wola, and the 3rd Battalion Krowice, with the regiment's command located in Bielawa. That evening, the division began its march south. The 62nd Infantry Regiment, along with the 3rd Battery of the 15th Light Artillery Regiment, moved out at 10:00 PM through Sokołowo, the Tułowo estate, Marysin, the Wola Adamowa estate, and Rzeżewo. A pioneer platoon was tasked with destroying bridges in Sokołów and Turow after the Polish forces had crossed. On 10 September, by morning, the 1st Battalion had reached Sobieszczany, the 2nd Battalion Błędowo, and the 3rd Battalion forest near Brzyszewo. The regiment's command, along with its special platoons, was located at the Rzeżewo estate.

The 15th Infantry Division took up defense on the Śmiłowice–Kuźnice line, while the rest of the division prepared to launch an offensive towards Lubraniec or Brześć Kujawski. Based on the 62nd Infantry Regiment, the division assembled an assault group capable of attacking in either direction. The 62nd Infantry Regiment, along with the 86th Infantry Battalion, the Bydgoszcz National Defense Battalion, and the 82nd Independent Machine Gun and Anti-Tank Company, concentrated in the Grabkowo–Czerniewice–Pustki Wilkowskie–Szczutkowo–Kępka Szlachecka area, awaiting orders for an offensive. The starting line for the attack was set along the Pustki Wilkowskie–Czerniewice Manor line. The 3rd Battery of the 15th Light Artillery Regiment and the 15th Field Artillery Division were designated as artillery support for the 62nd Infantry Regiment group.

On 11 September, at dawn, the battalions of the 62nd Infantry Regiment took positions:

- The 1st Battalion at Pustki Wilkowieckie,
- The 2nd Battalion at Czerniewice–Grabkowo,
- The 3rd Battalion at Kępka Szlachecka–Szczutkowo.

The 82nd Machine Gun Company and the regiment's command were stationed in Szczutkowo. At 1:30 PM, the 62nd Infantry Regiment received orders to conduct a sortie towards Nakonowo–Gołaszewo. After an artillery preparation by the 3rd Battery of the 15th Light Artillery Regiment, excluding the 9th Howitzer Battery, the 62nd Infantry Regiment captured the area around Hill 99.0 and Świerkowo, advancing to the Nakonowo–Gołaszewo line, attacking a German heavy artillery battalion in retreat.

On the night of 11–12 September, the 62nd Infantry Regiment repositioned to the Unisławice area. The 1st Battalion was stationed at Dobrulewice, the 2nd Battalion at Grabkowo, and the 3rd Battalion at Modlibórz, with the regiment's command at Unisławice. On the evening of 12 September, most of the 15th Infantry Division withdrew towards Strzelce through Łanięta, leaving a Detached Unit consisting of the 62nd Infantry Regiment group.

The Detached Unit, commanded by Lieutenant Colonel Kazimierz Heilman-Rawicz, included the full 62nd Infantry Regiment, the 86th Infantry Battalion, the Bydgoszcz National Defense Battalion, and the 2nd Battery of the 15th Field Artillery Regiment. This unit was directly subordinated to the operational group of General Michał Tokarzewski-Karaszewicz. On the morning of 13 September, the Detached Unit was deployed as follows:

- The 1st Battalion along the Świątkowice–Grabkowo line,
- The 2nd Battalion along the Grabkowo–Czerniewice railway station line,
- The 3rd Battalion on the left wing near the village of Rzęgocin by the Lubieńka stream.

At 10:00 AM, German reconnaissance units from the 50th Infantry Division appeared in front of the 1st Battalion, but were repelled by artillery fire from the 4th and 15th Field Artillery Regiment. At 2:00 PM, the German 123rd Infantry Regiment launched an assault on the positions of the 1st and 2nd Battalions of the 62nd Infantry Regiment, directing their main thrust towards Grabkowo. The German attack was broken thanks to effective artillery support from the 4th and 6th Batteries of the 15th Field Artillery Regiment.

The German 123rd Infantry Regiment, reinforced with artillery and armored vehicles, launched a second assault at 2:00 PM. This time, the 123rd Infantry Regiment broke through the defenses of the 2nd Battalion at Czerniewice railway station and penetrated the battalion's defenses. The 86th Infantry Battalion, which had arrived in the morning from Szczytno, was brought into the fight. Supported by the 82nd Machine Gun Company and the fire of the 5th Battery of the 15th Field Artillery Regiment, the 86th Battalion halted the German advance and pushed them back to their starting positions.

At 3:00 PM, the 123rd Infantry Regiment launched a final assault along the railway line towards the northern part of Grabkowo, but this was stopped by fire from the 4th and 5th Batteries of the 15th Field Artillery Regiment. Following the collapse of this attack, the Germans began bombing the 62nd Infantry Regiment positions. Once the air raids ceased, the 121st Infantry Regiment, a reserve unit from the 50th Infantry Division, launched an attack, which was stopped by the 2nd Battalion of the 62nd Infantry Regiment and the 86th Infantry Battalion.

Due to the planned actions of the 15th Infantry Division against the German bridgehead near Płock, the 62nd Infantry Regiment group was ordered to join the division's main forces. At 10:00 PM, the Detached Unit began its march via Kłóbka, Pomorzany Manor, and Sokołów towards the forests to the north and south of the village of Lubieniek. By the morning of 14 September, the Detached Unit reached the vicinity of Szczawin Kościelny. The 1st Battalion was stationed at Waliszewo, covering the direction towards Gąbin, the 2nd Battalion at Jesionka, guarding the Helenów Forest, and the 3rd Battalion near Jankówka. The 62nd Infantry Regiment reconnaissance company monitored the area west of Szczawin Kościelny, while the regiment's command took position at the Szczawin Kościelny estate. The 86th Infantry Battalion marched through Lubień Kujawski and Budy Kaleńskie, reaching Korzeń. The Bydgoszcz National Defense Battalion was reassigned from the Detached Unit to the National Defense Group under the direct command of General Tokarzewski-Karaszewicz.

==== Participation in the battle of the Bzura ====
In connection with the assignment of part of the forces of the 15th Infantry Division to eliminate the German 3rd Infantry Division's bridgehead near Płock, the 62nd Infantry Regiment received orders to move to the forest north of Gąbin. On 15 September, the 62nd Infantry Regiment took up defensive positions: I/62nd Infantry Regiment near Koszelew, II/62nd Infantry Regiment near Topolno, and III/62nd Infantry Regiment in reserve at Topolno, covering the rear of the 15th Infantry Division.

Due to a change in the offensive strategy of the combined forces of the Poznań and Pomeranian armies, the 15th Infantry Division received orders to regroup to the area of Budy Stare. On 15 September, the 62nd Infantry Regiment, reinforced by the 82nd Motorized Cavalry Squadron, machine gun units, and a sapper company from the 15th Engineer Battalion, became the reserve of the 15th Infantry Division commander.

On the night of 15–16 September, the 62nd Infantry Regiment was transported by trucks through Topolno, Sanniki, Giżyce, Ruszki, and Młodzieszyn. On 16 September at 7:00 AM, the 62nd Infantry Regiment reached the forests north of Biała Góra. It halted for rest, with I/62nd Infantry Regiment securing Radziwiłłka forest, II/62nd Infantry Regiment near Biała Góra, and III/62nd Infantry Regiment south of Młodzieszyn, securing the direction to Ruszki. The regimental command was in Radziwiłłka forest.

Soon, by order of the 15th Infantry Division commander, II/62nd Infantry Regiment, along with 3/15th Artillery Regiment, was sent to the eastern bank of the Bzura river. During the march, the battalion received orders to take a defensive position on the western bank of the river, between Biała Góra and Hill 83.4, thus closing the crossing at Brochów. By dusk on 16 September, II battalion repelled several German infantry assaults, supported by tanks, immobilizing several vehicles. The 62nd Infantry Regiment reconnaissance company was conducting reconnaissance of the crossings over the Bzura.

On the night of 16–17 September, the III/62nd Infantry Regiment crossed the Bzura near Witkowice, followed by I/62nd Infantry Regiment. At dawn on 17 September, both battalions took up defense in Brochów. At 7:00 AM, the 62nd Infantry Regiment, excluding II/62nd Infantry Regiment, received orders from Brigadier General Zdzisław Przyjałkowski to launch an attack from Brochów towards Wólka Smolana.

The regiment's attack was stopped by German forces before the Wólka Aleksandrowska forest. German counterattacks forced the regiment to go into defense. I/62nd Infantry Regiment set up defense in Wólka Smolana, while III/62nd Infantry Regiment defended near Lasocin. At 10:00 AM, German infantry attacked the junction between III/62nd Infantry Regiment and the 61st Infantry Regiment but was halted by machine gun fire.

At 1:00 PM, after heavy artillery bombardment and an air raid, German infantry, supported by tanks from the 36th Tank Regiment of the 4th Armored Division, launched an attack. The German assault was repelled at high cost to both regiments. The defense of the 62nd Infantry Regiment was supported by the 9th Howitzer Battery of the 15th Artillery Regiment.

At around 3:00 PM, the Germans launched a third assault, breaking through the defense at the junction between III/62nd Infantry Regiment and 61st Infantry Regiment. Under the pressure of German infantry and tanks, the 62nd Infantry Regiment, without II/62nd Infantry Regiment, began to retreat towards Brochów. At 4:00 PM, a German infantry and tank encirclement from the Janów area forced the 62nd Infantry Regiment to withdraw from Brochów towards the northeastern direction, deep into the Kampinos Forest. The 62nd Infantry Regiment suffered heavy casualties during the fierce fighting, including the death of Major Stanisław Liszka, commander of III/62nd Infantry Regiment.

The II battalion of the 62nd Infantry Regiment held the Biała Góra–Hill 83.4 defensive position throughout the day. After dusk, following the German occupation of Brochów, II/62nd Infantry Regiment withdrew towards Witkowice. On the night of 18 September at 2:00 AM, the battalion crossed the Bzura river at Witkowice, marching towards Kromnow. Near Kromnow, the battalion defeated a German infantry unit. Then, along the narrow-gauge railway, II/62nd Infantry Regiment repelled German tanks attempting to halt its march. After clearing the way, the battalion continued its movement into the Kampinos Forest. Major Wojciech Gniadek was wounded, and command was temporarily taken over by Lieutenant Kazimierz Orłowski.

==== Retreat battles in the Kampinos Forest ====
On 18 September, from the early morning hours, the remnants of the 62nd Infantry Regiment and the 15th Infantry Division gathered in the area of Myszory and Famułki Królewskie. They then marched along the northern edge of the Kampinos Forest, following the tracks of the narrow-gauge railway between Tułowice and Rybitew. Near Polesie, these units engaged in combat along the fortified defensive line of the German 12th Infantry Regiment. After several unsuccessful attempts to break through, the fighting was halted at midday. The units bypassed the German defenses and reached the Cybulice area, where they stopped in the late afternoon.

By the afternoon, the II/62nd Infantry Regiment arrived in the area of Stare Polesie and joined forces already engaged in combat with the German 12th Infantry Regiment. The battalion deployed the 4th and 5th Rifle Companies parallel to the railway and the road. However, German flanking fire inflicted significant losses. The reserve 6th Rifle Company launched a successful attack on the battalion's left flank, forcing the German infantry to retreat from the battalion's sector. The II/62nd Infantry Regiment, using its full strength, broke through the German blockade. The battalion reached Modlin and, marching along the Vistula, headed toward the Palmir Forest. That evening, the 15th Infantry Division resumed its march toward the forests northwest of Sieraków.

By the afternoon of 19 September, after marching through Małocice and Adamówek, the 15th Infantry Division regrouped near the Pociecha forest station. Here, the division and the 62nd Infantry Regiment reorganized, incorporating soldiers from the 15th Infantry Division and other units. The reorganized 62nd Infantry Regiment consisted of two understrength battalions. That evening, the 15th Infantry Division received orders from General Tadeusz Kutrzeba to capture the area around Mościska and Laski.

The 62nd Infantry Regiment became part of the division's main column, alongside the 59th Infantry Regiment and remnants of the 15th Artillery Regiment, under the command of Lieutenant Colonel Józef Drotlewa, the division's chief of staff. They moved through Sieraków, Laski, Wólka Węglowa, and Wawrzyszew. At dawn on 20 September, the 62nd Infantry Regiment launched an attack on Sieraków.

The attack was led by the I Battalion, commanded by Captain Jan Murkociński on the regiment's right flank, and the III Battalion, commanded by Lieutenant Lucjan Kühn on the left. By midday, the 62nd Infantry Regiment and 61st Infantry Regiment, supported by the 2nd and 6th Batteries of the 15th Artillery Regiment, continued their offensive from Sieraków toward Laski. However, the regiment's advance stalled along the line from Laski to Wólka Węglowa, which was defended by the German 15th Motorized Infantry Regiment from the 29th Motorized Infantry Division, supported by tanks from the German 1st Light Division.

The I Battalion reached the edge of the forest opposite Mościska, where it was surrounded, and its soldiers were taken prisoner. The remaining forces regrouped toward Młociny, where the II Battalion, under Major Wojciech Gniadek, rejoined the 62nd Infantry Regiment. Under cover from the 25th Infantry Division, the 15th Infantry Division moved under German artillery fire to Bielany and then to Wawrzyszew.

==== Defense of Warsaw ====
From the morning of 21 September, the 15th Infantry Division regrouped in Wawrzyszew. The II/62 Battalion secured the area west of Wawrzyszew, covering the division's concentration and reorganization. During the night of 21–22 September, the II/62 Battalion launched a preemptive raid against German positions west of Wawrzyszew. On 22 September, the remnants of the 15th Infantry Division, excluding the 61st Infantry Regiment, moved through the streets of Warsaw to the area near the Powązki and Evangelical Cemeteries.

On 23 September, the division was reinforced with soldiers from the Pomeranian Army who had managed to break through to Warsaw. After reorganization, the 62nd Infantry Regiment, now consisting of two battalions, was placed in reserve and billeted near the school on Okopowa Street.

On the evening of 25 September, the regiment moved to the "South" sector (Mokotów) near Belweder, taking up positions in the second line of defense. During the night of 26–27 September, German infantry launched an assault on the "Sielce" defensive position. The II/62 Battalion was committed to the fight and successfully halted the German advance in the area of Belwederska Street. The 6th Rifle Company faced particularly heavy combat, counterattacking near Dolna Street. The regiment suffered significant losses, including the deaths of Lieutenant Zbigniew Hołyszewski and Lieutenant Tomasz Sobański.

At noon on 27 September, a ceasefire was declared, and on 28 September at 1:00 PM, the garrison of Warsaw officially capitulated. That afternoon, the 62nd Infantry Regiment relocated to the Czerniaków area, around Chełmska, Czerniakowska, Belwederska, and Kaszubska Streets. Lists were compiled, identification documents were issued, roll calls were conducted, and a ceremonial assembly was held. The regiment surrendered its equipment and weapons.

On 30 September, at 8:00 PM, the 62nd Infantry Regiment, as part of the 15th Infantry Division, departed Warsaw in a marching column. Their route passed through Blizne, Chrzanów Nowy, Ożarów, Błonie, Sochaczew, and Łowicz, leading to prisoner-of-war transit camps. The 62nd Infantry Regiment suffered significant losses during the 1939 campaign, with 21 officers and approximately 635 soldiers killed or wounded. An estimated 990 soldiers were injured.

=== 62nd Infantry Regiment Surplus Collection Unit ===
After mobilizing the planned units, a significant surplus of mobilized soldiers remained due to exemplary turnout from reservists. On 27 August, over 600 surplus soldiers from the 62nd Infantry Regiment, under the command of Major Mieczysław Makarewicz, departed by train to Sandomierz to form the Replacement Depot of the 15th Infantry Division. They arrived on 30 August and were stationed in Wielowieś near Sandomierz. From 30 August to 6 September, organizational efforts commenced under Lieutenant Colonel Józef Wyzina, the depot commander, who had also arrived during this period.

As the general mobilization was announced, more reservists with assignments to the 15th Infantry Division reported for duty. They were equipped with uniforms, equipment, and weapons. Continued arrivals of reservists at the barracks in Bydgoszcz enabled the formation of further surpluses. Under Lieutenant Colonel Stanisław Boehm, these surpluses were organized into a surplus battalion, commanded by Captain Kazimierz Rogoziewicz.

The surplus battalion of 62nd Infantry Regiment, accompanied by Lieutenant Colonel Boehm, marched out of Bydgoszcz during the night of 2–3 September, passing through Solec Kujawski to Toruń. From there, the battalion advanced beyond Włocławek and briefly traveled 50 kilometers by train before continuing on foot due to destroyed rail tracks. On 9 September, the battalion reached Sochaczew. While crossing the bridge over the Bzura river in Sochaczew, it came under German machine gun and artillery fire, suffering partial disbandment. One group, led by Lieutenant Colonel Boehm, crossed the bridge and joined the 15th Infantry Division. The remaining soldiers regrouped in the forests north of Sochaczew, later crossing the Bzura and making their way through the Kampinos Forest to Warsaw.

The 62nd Infantry Regiment Surplus Collection Unit stationed in Sandomierz, along with mobilized reservists in the area, formed two infantry battalions under Major Kazimierz Kruczkowski and Lieutenant Colonel Józef Wyzina. These battalions became part of the Sandomierz Group, commanded by Lieutenant Colonel Antoni Sikorski.

The retreating remnants of the 15th Infantry Division were reinforced by the surplus battalion from 62nd Infantry Regiment, brought by Lieutenant Colonel Boehm, who assumed command of the 15th Infantry Division. Additional units, including the 61st Infantry Regiment Surplus Collection Unit and a surplus supply company from 59th Infantry Division, joined them. On 14 September, these resources formed an infantry battalion under Captain Józef Walusz, which was incorporated into the 2nd Reserve Infantry Regiment of the XXIX Reserve Infantry Brigade.

On 16 September, part of an infantry battalion named "Kraków", led by Captain Adam Szczybalski, was formed within the 15th Infantry Division and joined the infantry of the Dubno Group, commanded by Colonel Stefan Hanka-Kulesza.

Following the Soviet invasion, the remnants of the 15th Infantry Division under Lieutenant Colonel Boehm withdrew from the Volodymyr-Volynskyi region to the Lublin area. On 29 September, the remaining 15th Infantry Division units between Lublin and Kraśnik were dissolved. The final group of surplus soldiers from 62nd Infantry Regiment, led by Lieutenant Colonel Stanisław Boehm, was captured by German forces on 30 September in the village of Szczuczki near Lublin.

Organizational structure and personnel composition in September 1939
Position	Rank, name	Notes
Regimental Commander	Lieutenant Colonel Kazimierz Heilman-Rawicz	
First Adjutant	Captain Bolesław Rassalski	Wounded on 20 September in Wólka Węglowa
Second Adjutant	Captain Wojciech Adam Nowak	
Information Officer	Second Lieutenant Józef Andrzejewski	
Communication Officer	Captain Stanisław Stawski	
Liaison Officer to the 15th Infantry Division	Second Lieutenant Adam Kosicki	
Office Manager	Second Lieutenant (reserve) Wacław Nalaszek	
Quartermaster units of non-battalion units		
Quartermaster	Captain Jan Murkociński	
Payment Officer	Second Lieutenant (reserve) Florian Ignacy Janicki	
Food Supply Officer	Second Lieutenant (reserve) Jan Pisula	
Chief Medical Officer	Major Jerzy Zygmunt Suwiński	
Bandmaster	Captain Stanisław Grabowski	
Chaplain	Father Franciszek Dachtera	
Armament Officer (armorer)	Master Sergeant Franciszek Grabios	
Commander of the Supply Company	Lieutenant Wojciech Kiss-Orski	
Chief of the Supply Company	Senior Sergeant Fl. Kubicki	
Deputy Commander of the Transport Unit	Platoon Sergeant M. Żywiołowski	
1st battalion		
Battalion Commander	Captain Władysław Liniarski Captain Jan Murkociński	Contused on 19 September, captured from 20 September 1939
Battalion Adjutant	Second Lieutenant Józef Rusinek	
Communication Platoon Commander	Officer Cadet Tadeusz Pawlak	
Payment Officer	Second Lieutenant (reserve) Henryk Waciński	
Food Supply Officer	Second Lieutenant (reserve) Jan Palmowski	
Medical Officer	Second Lieutenant Gmerek	
Commander of the 1st Rifle Company	Lieutenant Kazimierz Bronisław Ortyl	
Commander of the 1st Platoon	Second Lieutenant Sylwester Sobociński	
Commander of the 2nd Platoon	Lieutenant Leon Mrugowski	
Commander of the 2nd Rifle Company	Second Lieutenant Jan Murach	
Commander of the 2nd Rifle Company	Second Lieutenant Mieczysław Wieczorek	
Commander of the 1st Platoon	Second Lieutenant Edmund Nowak	
Commander of the 2nd Platoon	Second Lieutenant Bronisław Wojtynowski	
Commander of the 2nd Rifle Company	Second Lieutenant Zdzisław Wiśniewski	
Commander of the 3rd Rifle Company	Lieutenant Czesław Wachowicz	
Commander of the 1st Platoon	Second Lieutenant Michał Ekert	
Commander of the 2nd Platoon	Second Lieutenant Jan Machnik	
Commander of the 2nd Rifle Company	Second Lieutenant Karol Szczynialski	
Commander of the 1st Heavy Machine Gun Company	Captain Bronisław Brzeziński	
Commander of the 1st Platoon	Second Lieutenant Wacław Milczarek	
Commander of the 2nd Platoon	Second Lieutenant Czesław Bartkowiak	
Commander of the 2nd Rifle Company	Second Lieutenant Stefan Jędrzejewski	
Commander of the 4th Platoon	Lieutenant Tadeusz Dydyński	
Commander of the Mortar Platoon	Second Lieutenant Alfred Janowski	
2nd battalion		
Battalion Commander	Major Wojciech Gniadek Lieutenant Kazimierz Orłowski	Wounded on 18 September (from 20 September 1939) (18–19 September 1939)
Battalion Adjutant	Lieutenant Ludwik Matuszewski	
Communication Platoon Commander	Second Lieutenant Jan Brzozowski	
Payment Officer	Second Lieutenant Wincenty Kwiatkowski	
Food Supply Officer	Second Lieutenant Czesław Łaniewski	
Medical Officer	Officer Cadet Edmund Zwiński	
Commander of the 4th Rifle Company	Lieutenant Aleksander Braciszewicz	
Commander of the 1st Platoon	Second Lieutenant Antoni Nowak	
Commander of the 2nd Platoon	Second Lieutenant Józef Godek	
Commander of the 2nd Rifle Company	Second Lieutenant Józef Kłysz	
Commander of the 5th Rifle Company	Second Lieutenant (reserve) Bronisław Pszczółkowski	
Commander of the 1st Platoon	Second Lieutenant Lucjan Matuszak	
Commander of the 2nd Platoon	Second Lieutenant Jan Wrzesiński	
Commander of the 2nd Rifle Company	Second Lieutenant Marian Pankowski	
Commander of the 6th Rifle Company	Lieutenant Zbigniew Hołyszewski	Killed on 27 September 1939
Commander of the 1st Platoon	Second Lieutenant Jan Kościelny	
Commander of the 2nd Platoon	Second Lieutenant Henryk Rasz-Brzeski	
Commander of the 2nd Rifle Company	Lieutenant Roman Szymałka	
Commander of the 2nd Heavy Machine Gun Company	Lieutenant Kazimierz Stefan Orłowski	
Commander of the 1st Platoon	Second Lieutenant Bolesław Gawroński	
Commander of the 2nd Platoon	Second Lieutenant Brunon Grajewski	
Commander of the 2nd Rifle Company	Senior Sergeant Wiktor Szczęch	
Commander of the 4th Platoon	Second Lieutenant Stanisław Goździk	
Commander of the Mortar Platoon	Second Lieutenant Władysław Kostka	
3rd battalion		
Battalion Commander	Major Stanisław Liszka Lieutenant Lucjan Kühn	Killed on 17 September from 17 September 1939
Battalion Adjutant	Second Lieutenant Ignacy Król	
Payment Officer	Second Lieutenant Wiliński	
Commander of the 7th Rifle Company	Lieutenant Jan Czesław Jeżewski	
Commander of the 1st Platoon	Second Lieutenant Leon Spychała	
Commander of the 2nd Platoon	Second Lieutenant Florian Malchrowicz	
Commander of the 2nd Rifle Company	Second Lieutenant Alfred Markiewicz	
Commander of the 8th Rifle Company	Second Lieutenant (reserve) Wiktor Stanisław Dębicki	
Commander of the 1st Platoon	Second Lieutenant Kazimierz Piątkowski	
Commander of the 2nd Platoon	Second Lieutenant Daniel Kozak	
Commander of the 2nd Rifle Company	Second Lieutenant Witold Zbychorski	
Commander of the 9th Rifle Company	Lieutenant Brunon Józef Westphal	Killed on 6 September 1939
Commander of the 1st Platoon	Lieutenant Franciszek Małek	
Commander of the 2nd Platoon	Second Lieutenant Jerzy Wiese	
Commander of the 2nd Rifle Company	Second Lieutenant Zygmunt Omilianowski	
Commander of the 3rd Heavy Machine Gun Company	Lieutenant Lucjan Kühn	
Commander of the 1st Platoon	Second Lieutenant Paweł Szajkowski	
Commander of the 2nd Platoon	Second Lieutenant Kurt Klonecki	
Commander of the 2nd Rifle Company	Second Lieutenant Franciszek Baron	
Commander of the 4th Platoon	Second Lieutenant Kazimierz Rozciszewski	
Commander of the Mortar Platoon	Second Lieutenant Stefan Marcinkowski	
Special units		
Reconnaissance Company Commander	Second Lieutenant Jan Stachowiak	
Mounted Reconnaissance Platoon Commander	Second Lieutenant (reserve) Jan Winnicki	
Cyclist Platoon Commander	Second Lieutenant (reserve) Saski	
Anti-Tank Company Commander	Second Lieutenant Łukasz Ciepliński	
Platoon Commander	Second Lieutenant Wojek	
Platoon Commander	Senior Sergeant Tomasz Kędzierski	
Platoon Commander	Platoon Sergeant Czesław Ciesielski	
Infantry Artillery Platoon Commander	Captain Jan Henryk Rysy	
Engineer Platoon Commander	Second Lieutenant (reserve) Józef Trojański	
Communication Platoon Commander	Senior Sergeant Wiktor Kosmowski	
Chemical Defense Platoon Commander	Second Lieutenant (reserve) Kazimierz Kasprzycki	
March battalion of the 62nd Infantry Regiment		
Battalion Commander	Captain Aleksander Mamunow	
Battalion Adjutant	Second Lieutenant Feliks Bartoszewicz	
Commander of the 1st Rifle Company	Lieutenant Edmund Markiewicz	
Commander of the 1st Platoon	Lieutenant Tomasz Sobański	Killed on 27 September 1939
Commander of the 2nd Platoon	Second Lieutenant Henryk Wiśniewski	
Commander of the 2nd Rifle Company	Lieutenant Jan Miszkuro	
Commander of the 1st Platoon	Lieutenant Józef Duczmal	
Commander of the 2nd Platoon	Second Lieutenant Edmund Podemski	
Commander of the 3rd Rifle Company	Lieutenant Jan Lubiński	
Commander of the 1st Platoon	Second Lieutenant Stanisław Janiszewski	
Commander of the 2nd Platoon	Second Lieutenant Konrad Markiewicz	
Commander of the 2nd Rifle Company	Second Lieutenant Roman Zys	
Commander of the Heavy Machine Gun Company	Second Lieutenant Edward Kraśkiewicz	
Commander of the 1st Platoon	Second Lieutenant Józef Machuta	
Commander of the 2nd Platoon	Second Lieutenant Piotr Gibas	
Commander of the 2nd Rifle Company	Second Lieutenant Raczymowski	
Commander of the Special Platoon	Second Lieutenant Henryk Misterek	

== Regimental symbols ==
=== Standard ===
On 15 July 1924, the President of the Republic of Poland approved the design for the 62nd Infantry Regiment's banner. On 4 August 1924, President Stanisław Wojciechowski presented the regiment with the banner, which was funded by the citizens of Bydgoszcz and the Bydgoszcz County.

On the right side of the flag was a maroon cross, in the center of which was an embroidered eagle in a laurel wreath. On the white fields between the arms of the cross was the number 62 in laurel wreaths. On the left side of the flag, in the center of the cavalry cross, was a wreath identical to the one on the right side, and within the wreath, a three-line inscription: "HONOR AND HOMELAND". In the corners of the banner, in smaller wreaths, were placed shields with the following images:

- In the upper right: on a red shield, a white eagle.
- In the upper left: the coat of arms of Bydgoszcz.
- In the lower right: the image of the Black Madonna of Częstochowa.
- In the lower left: the coat of arms of Zambrów.

On the arms of the cross were inscriptions commemorating locations related to the regiment's history:

- Upper arm: "POZNAŃ 28. XII. 1918, KIJÓW 8. V. 1920, WARSZAWA from 11. VIII. to 17. VIII. 1920"
- Lower arm: "KCYNIA-PATEREK from 25. I. to 18. IV. 1919, PLATERÓW-SARNAKI 1-5. VIII. 1920, JAŁÓWKA-SWISŁOCZ 17.-22. IX. 1920"
- Left arm: "RYNARZEWO from 14. I. to 24. I. 1919, KOZIATYN-PIKOWCE 27.-28. IV. 1920, GLINIANKA 17.-18. VIII. 1920."
- Right arm: "KOBYLA GÓRA 12. I. 1919, BERDYCZÓW 26. IV. 1920, ZAMBRÓW 20. VIII. 1920."

A white and red ribbon with the inscription commemorating the banner's benefactors was attached to the standard, reading: "City of Bydgoszcz to its children, the vicinity of Bydgoszcz to its children".

Since 28 January 1938, the regimental flag was officially referred to as a standard. From 1971, the standard has been housed at the Polish Army Museum in Warsaw.

=== Commemorative badge ===
On 30 December 1924, the Minister of Military Affairs, Major General Władysław Sikorski, approved the badge for the 62nd Infantry Regiment. The badge, measuring 49x49 mm, is shaped like a Maltese cross covered in white enamel, symbolizing virtue, bravery, and sacrifice made by soldiers for the homeland. In the center of the cross is a blue shield with the number 62. The badge is made in two parts, crafted from tombak, with silver and gold plating.

There were two versions of the badge: an officer's (enamelled) version and a soldier's version. The badge design was created by Captain Jerzy Zaleski, and the manufacturer was Wiktor Gontarczyk from Warsaw. The manufacturer of the officer's badge, which was donated to the Polish Army Museum by the Ministry of Military Affairs in 1925, was the goldsmith and engraver Paul Kinder from Bydgoszcz.

== Greater Poland riflemen ==
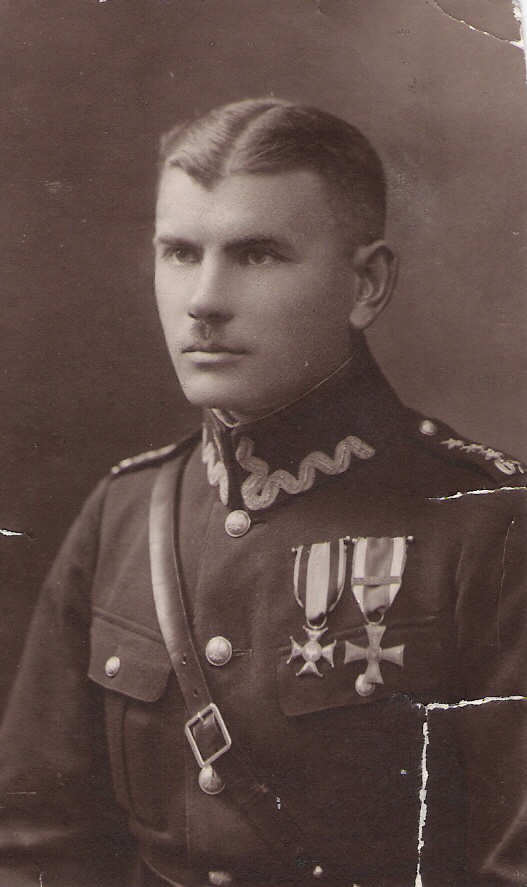
Captain Edward Pawłowski – officer of the regiment

=== Regiment commanders ===
- Lieutenant Ludwik Bociański (November 1918 – 30 June 1919)
- Captain Mieczysław Paluch (1 July – 23 October 1919)
- Captain Jan Namysł (24 October 1919 – 12 January 1920)
- Colonel Władysław Miszałowski (14 January – 4 June 1919)
- Colonel Bronisław Korczyc (5 – 16 June 1919)
- Lieutenant Colonel Władysław Grabowski (17 June 1920 – 20 February 1928 → commander of the divisional infantry of the 14th Infantry Division)
- Lieutenant Colonel Otton Czuruk (General Staff / Diplomatic Infantry) (20 February 1928 – 23 December 1929 → head of the department in the 4th General Staff Branch)
- Lieutenant Colonel / Colonel Władysław Powierza (Diplomatic Infantry) (21 January 1930 – October 1936 → commander of the divisional infantry of the 23rd Infantry Division)
- Lieutenant Colonel Kazimierz Heilman-Rawicz (October 1936 – 28 September 1939)

=== Deputy regiment commanders ===
Sources:

- Major Wacław Kostek-Biernacki (acting from 22 July 1922 – ? → acting deputy commander of the 4th Training Infantry Division)
- Lieutenant Colonel Stanisław Tarczyński (until 21 August 1926 → commander of the 67th Infantry Regiment)
- Lieutenant Colonel Józef Ćwiertniak (General Staff) (20 October 1926 – 31 March 1927 → commander of the 12th Infantry Regiment)
- Major / Lieutenant Colonel Kazimierz II Sokołowski (5 May 1927 – 23 October 1931 → director of the 7th Regional Military Property and Real Estate Office)
- Lieutenant Colonel Kazimierz Heilman-Rawicz (30 November 1931 – October 1936 → commander of the 62nd Infantry Regiment)
- Lieutenant Colonel Jan Szewczyk (until 24 August 1939 → commander of the 208th Infantry Regiment)

=== Second deputy commanders of the regiment – quartermasters ===
- Lieutenant Colonel Stanisław Boehm (until 24 August 1939 → deputy commander of the 15th Infantry Division Reserve)

=== Soldiers of the 62nd Infantry Regiment – victims of the Katyn massacre ===
Name	Rank	Profession	Place of work before mobilization	Murdered
Bałka Franciszek	Captain			Kharkiv
Błęcki Jan Izydor	2nd Lieutenant (reserve)	Clerk	Tax Chamber in Grudziądz	Kharkiv
Bartkowiak Czesław	2nd Lieutenant (reserve)		Schools in Kcynia and Bydgoszcz	Katyn
Behrendt Alojzy	2nd Lieutenant (reserve)	Clerk		Katyn
Ciaputa Ludwik Jan	Lieutenant (reserve)	Teacher	School in Bydgoszcz	Kharkiv
Hoppe Edward	2nd Lieutenant (reserve)	Teacher	School in Bydgoszcz	Katyn
Jarmark Walerian	Lieutenant (reserve)	Teacher	Primary school	Kharkiv
Loroch Piotr	Lieutenant (reserve)	Teacher	Gymnasium in Kościerzyna	Katyn
Łakota Kazimierz	Lieutenant (reserve)	Lawyer		Kharkiv
Pękalski Marian	2nd Lieutenant (reserve)	Lawyer	Philatelic House in Poznań	Katyn
Pużanowski Witold	2nd Lieutenant (reserve)			Katyn
Rusinek Józef	2nd Lieutenant (reserve)	Teacher	School in Nakło nad Notecią	Katyn
Staśkiewicz Edmund	2nd Lieutenant (reserve)	Lawyer		Kharkiv
Zyś Roman	Lieutenant (reserve)	Teacher	School in Bydgoszcz	Kharkiv

== Bibliography ==
- "Dziennik Personalny Ministerstwa Spraw Wojskowych" [Personnel Journal of the Ministry of Military Affairs]. Polska Zbrojna (in Polish). 1931.
- Dymek, Przemysław (2013). Księga wrześniowych walk pułków wielkopolskich. Tom I Piechota [The Book of September Battles of Greater Poland Regiments. Volume I: Infantry] (in Polish). Oświęcim: Napoleon V. ISBN 978-83-7889-002-7.
- Dymek, Przemysław (2013). 62 Pułk Piechoty. Zarys historii wojennej pułków polskich w kampanii wrześniowej. Zeszyt 182 [62nd Infantry Regiment: An Outline of the War History of Polish Regiments in the September Campaign. Notebook 182] (in Polish). Pruszków: Ajaks. ISBN 978-83-62046-45-4.
- Radwański, Leon (1929). "Zarys historii wojennej 62-go pułku Piechoty Wielkopolskiej" [An Outline of the War History of the 62nd Greater Poland Infantry Regiment]. Polska Zjednoczona (in Polish).
- Rybka, Ryszard; Stepan, Kamil (2006). Rocznik oficerski 1939. Stan na dzień 23 marca 1939 [Officers' Yearbook 1939. Status as of 23 March 1939] (in Polish). Kraków: Biblioteka Jagiellońska. ISBN 83-7188-899-6.
