= 15th Greater Poland Light Artillery Regiment =

Polish unit of light artillery

- 15 Wielkopolski Pułk Artylerii Lekkiej
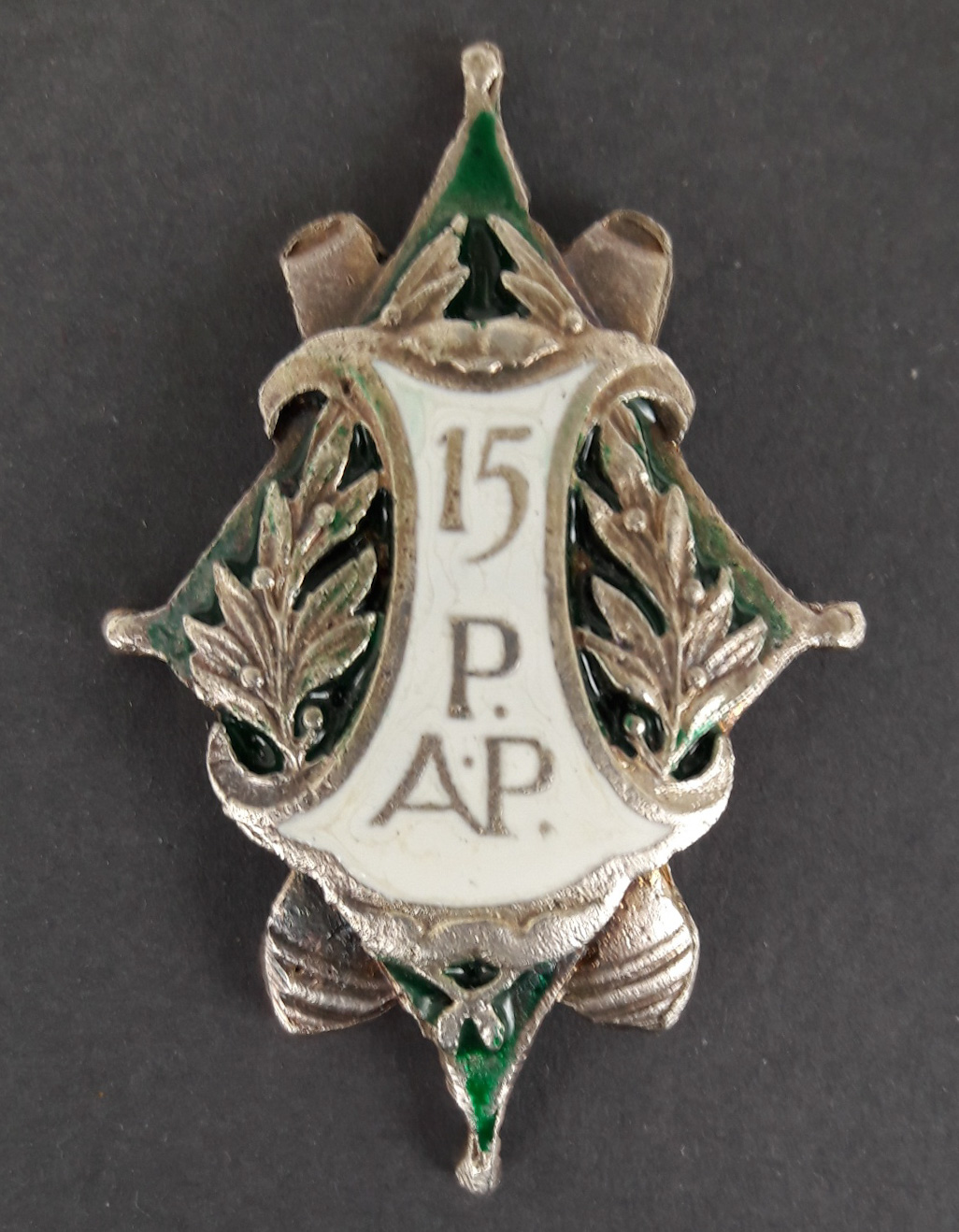
- Badge of the 15th Artillery Regiment
- Active: 1920–1939
- Country: Poland
- Allegiance: 15th Infantry Division
- Type: artillery
- Garrison/HQ: Bydgoszcz Garrison
- Anniversaries: August 17

Commanders
- First commander: Colonel Anatol Kędzierski
- Last commander: Lieutenant Colonel Jerzy Leonhard

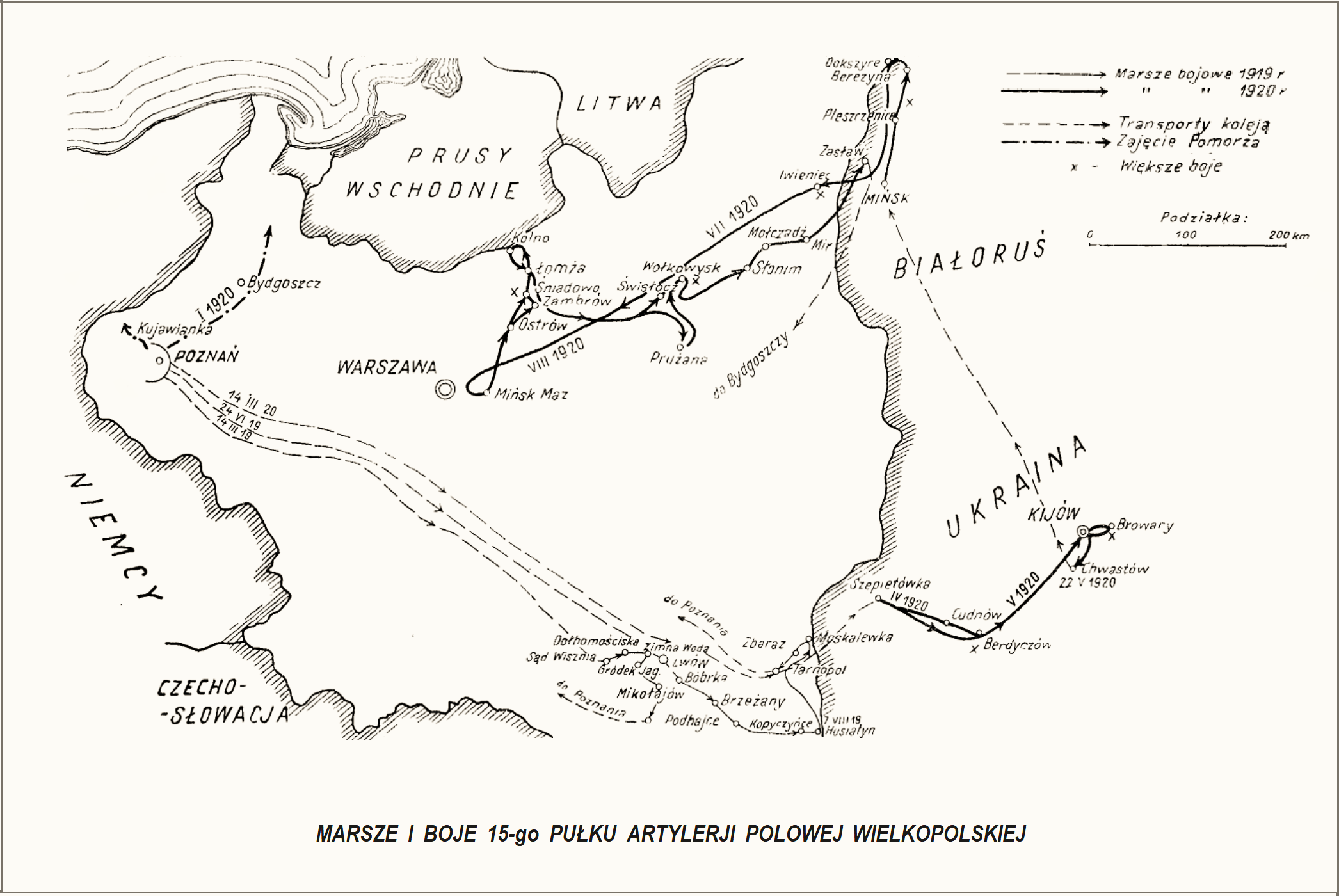
Marches and battles of the 15th Artillery Regiment

15th Greater Poland Light Artillery Regiment was a unit of light artillery in the Greater Poland Army and the Polish Armed Forces during the Second Polish Republic.

== Formation and battles ==
The first subunits of the future regiment were formed on 30 December 1918 at the White Barracks on Magazynowa Street in Poznań. From there, they departed to the front, where they were organized into batteries and squadrons. On 19 January 1919, the Polish Armed Forces Command in the former Prussian partition ordered Lieutenant Colonel Anatol Kędzierski to begin organizing the 1st Greater Poland Light Artillery Regiment. On 6 March 1919, these artillery subunits formed the regiment. On 21 September 1919, the unit was renamed to the 1st Greater Poland Field Artillery Regiment. During the conquest of Pomerania, the regiment was renamed the 15th Greater Poland Field Artillery Regiment. In September 1920, the regiment was equipped with German 77 mm field guns and 105 mm howitzers.

Personnel composition between 1919 and 1920
Commander of 1st squadron	Major Rudolf Niemira (until 8 October 1919)
Commander of 1st squadron	Lieutenant Jerzy Cegielski (from 8 October 1919)
Commander of 1st battery	Second Lieutenant Kazimierz Nieżychowski
Commander of 2nd battery	Captain Stanisław Adam Kamiński
Commander of 2nd battery	Lieutenant Józef Muślewski
Commander of 3rd battery	Second Lieutenant Marian Breliński
Commander of 2nd squadron	Major Brzeski
Commander of 2nd squadron	Major Dębski
Commander of 4th battery	Lieutenant Michał Chłapowski
Commander of 4th battery	Second Lieutenant Stefan Tadeusz Wypijewski
Commander of platoon (called "Kujawianka")	Gunner/Second Lieutenant Stefan Tadeusz Wypijewski
Commander of 5th battery	Lieutenant Suzin (1919)
Commander of 5th battery	Lieutenant Jan Heine (1920)
Machine gun crew	Corporal Biskup (Cross of Valour)
Battery officer	Second Lieutenant Józef Lorek †26 July 1920, Ostrów
Commander of 6th battery	Second Lieutenant Jasiński
Commander of 3rd squadron	Lieutenant Colonel Więckowski
Commander of 7th battery	Second Lieutenant/Lieutenant Jerzy Cegielski (until 8 October 1919)
Commander of 7th battery	Captain Leon Bogusławski
Battery officer	Lieutenant Ludwik Niewodniczański
Commander of 8th battery	Lieutenant Raszewski
	Cadet Żółtowski (Cross of Valour)
Commander of 9th battery	Second Lieutenant Marian Kaźmierczak
Battery officer	Second Lieutenant Marian Bieniak (Cross of Valour)
	Sergeant Rozmiarek (Cross of Valour)
	Sergeant Dirska (Cross of Valour)
	Corporal Spychaj (Cross of Valour)
Machine gun aimer	Bombardier Bachorski (Cross of Valour)
Conductor of the orchestra	Military official Mackiewicz

Maps of the regiment's battles

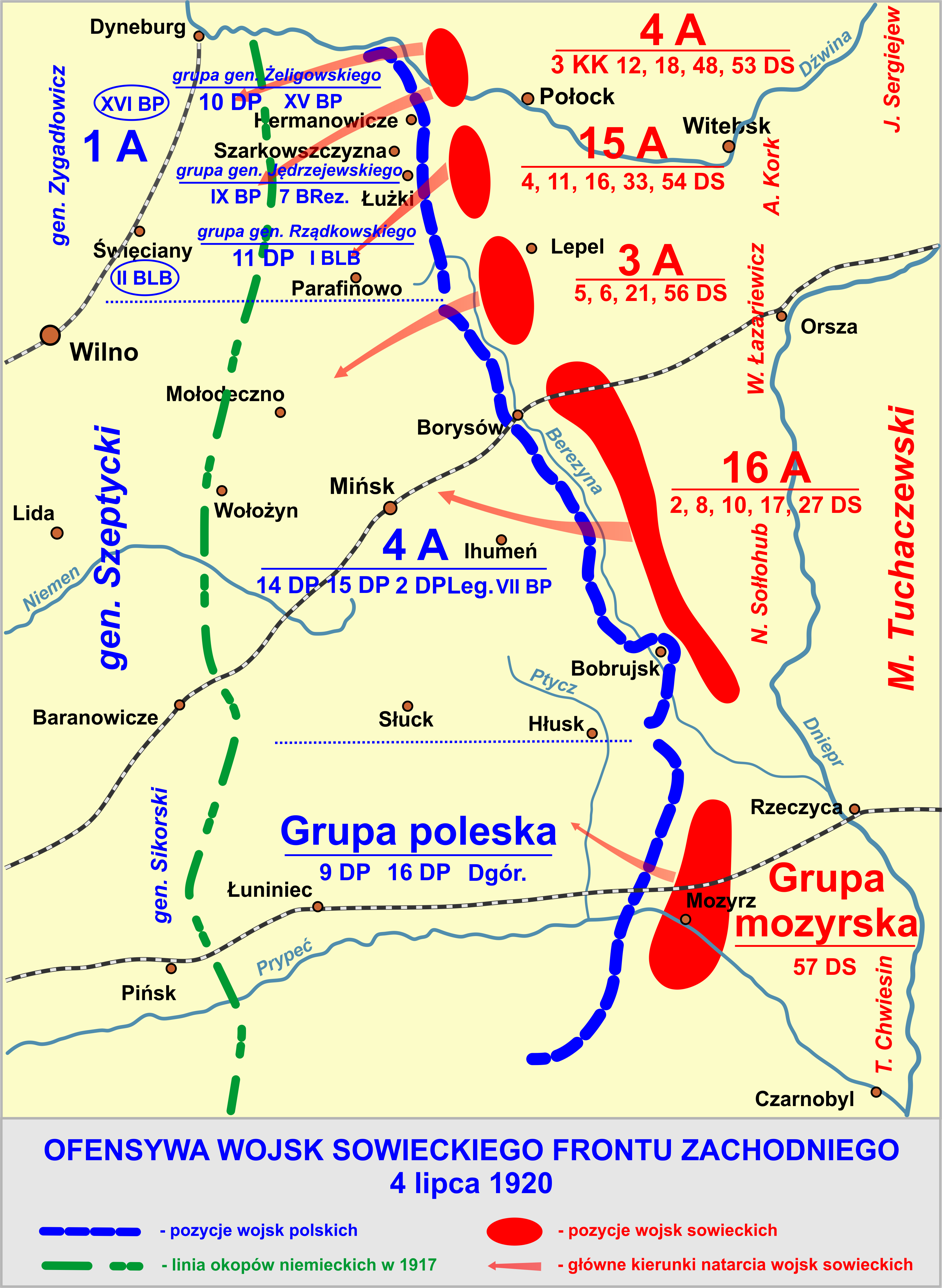

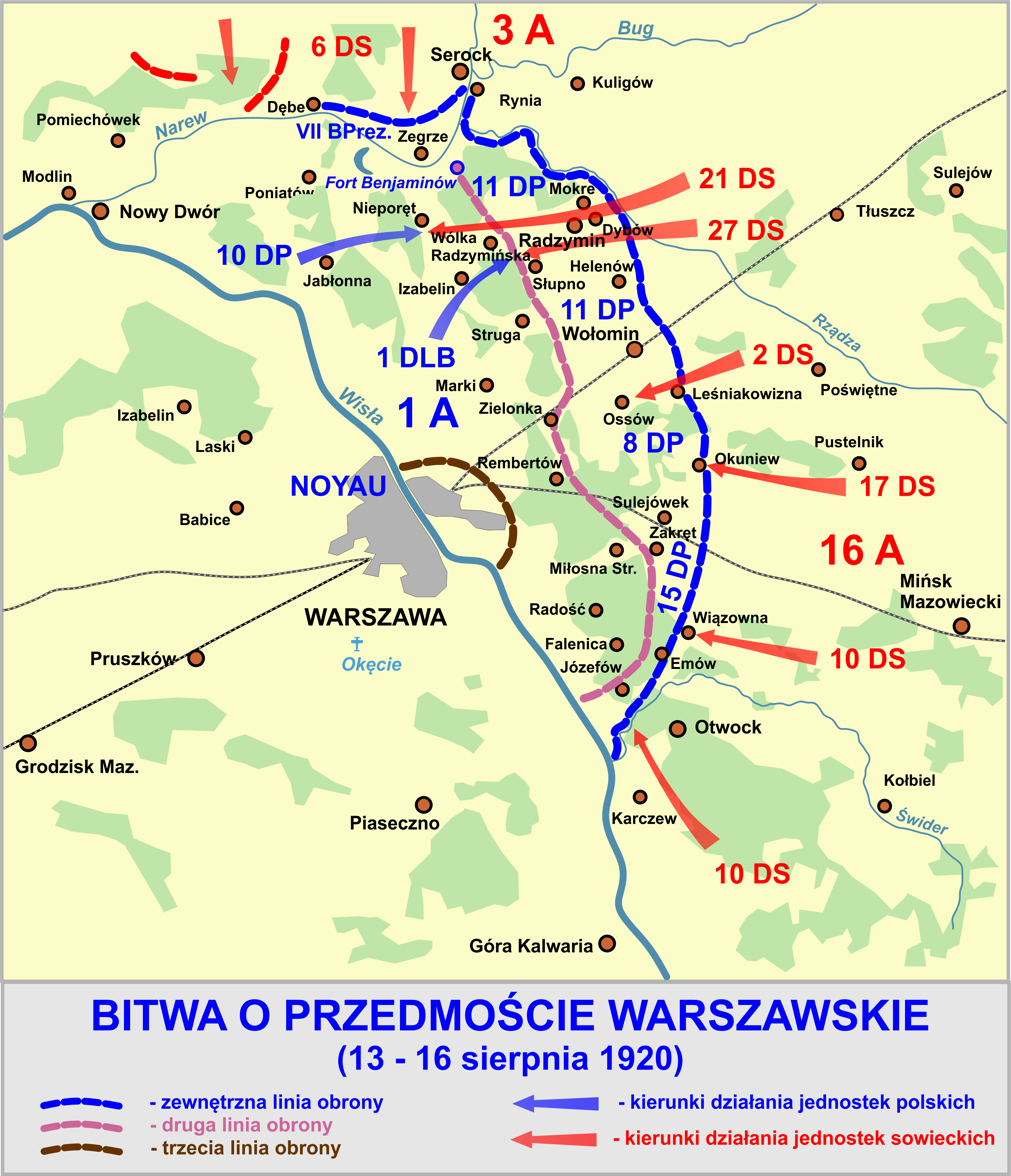

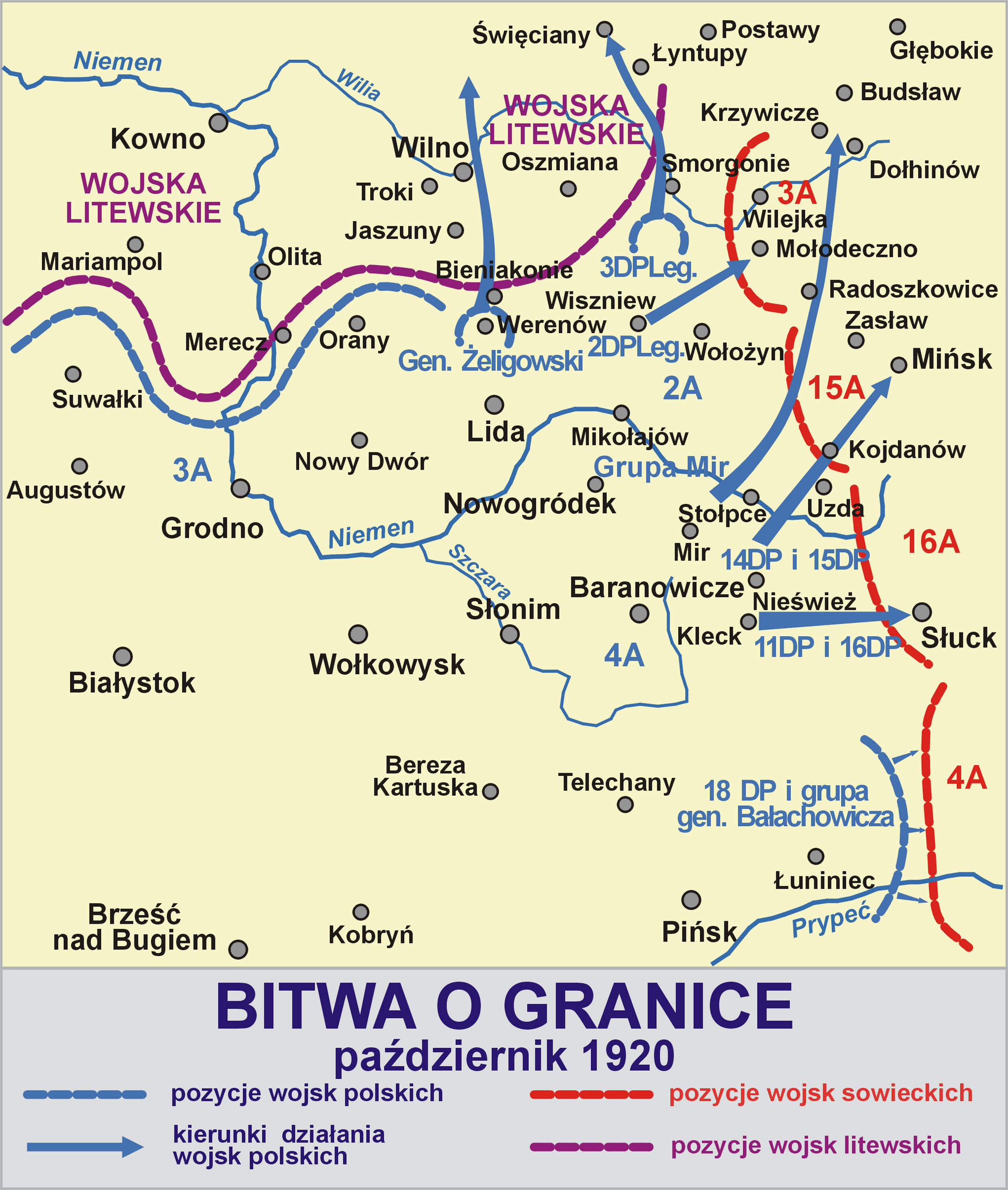

=== Recipients of the Virtuti Militari ===
Soldiers of the regiment awarded the Silver Cross of the Virtuti Militari War Order
Bombardier Marian Berger	Captain Leon Bogusławski	Second Lieutenant Marian Breliński
Corporal Antoni Bródka	Major Jerzy Cegielski (No. 1434)	Second Lieutenant Michał Drozdowicz
Sergeant Franciszek Duszyński (No. 4668)	Captain Władysław Dzieżgowski	Lieutenant Jan Heine
Lieutenant Marian Kaźmierczak (No. 4328)	Second Lieutenant Adolf Karłowski	Second Lieutenant Józef Lorek
Bombardier Stanisław Michalak	Lieutenant Józef Muślewski (No. 939)	Lieutenant Colonel Rudolf Niemira
Lieutenant Ludwik Niewodniczański	Lieutenant Kazimierz Nieżychowski	Captain Wiktor Rossa
Platoon Leader Ignacy Rychłowski	Corporal Antoni Sawiński	Bombardier Jan Spychaj
Bombardier Ludwik Woś	Corporal Tadeusz Żak	Captain Michał Zenkteler

== Regiment in peacetime ==
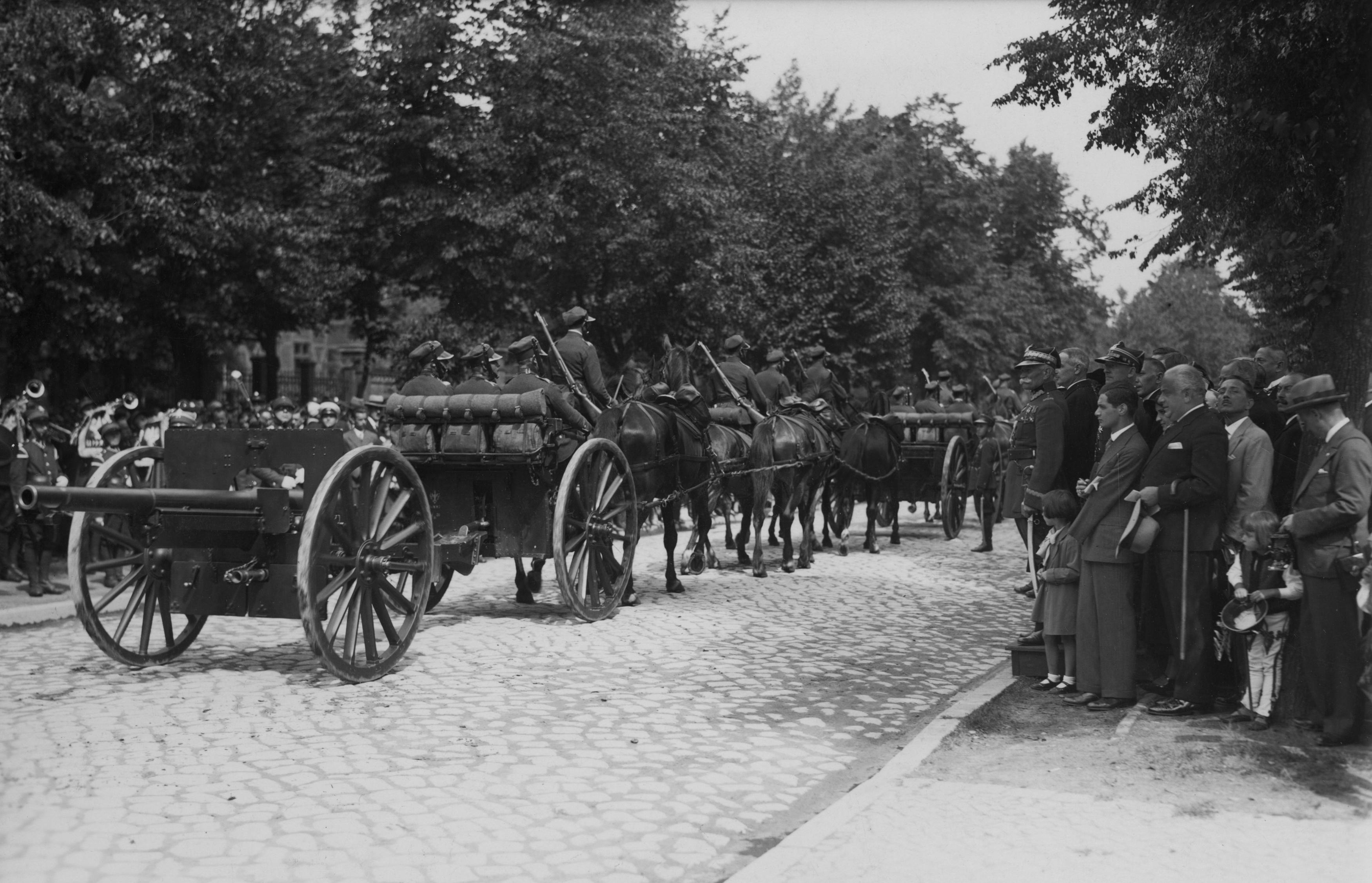
French 75 mm field gun – parade in Bydgoszcz

On 2 December 1920, the regiment arrived in the Bydgoszcz Garrison, where it remained stationed until 1939.

On 31 December 1931, based on the order of the Minister of Military Affairs, Marshal Józef Piłsudski, the 15th Artillery Regiment was renamed to the 15th Light Artillery Regiment.

On Sunday, 26 August 1938, two ceremonies were held in Bydgoszcz. In the Old Market Square, the ceremony for the welcome of the 15th Artillery Regiment and the 11th Light Artillery Regiment's standards took place. The ceremony began at 9:30 AM with the performance of a generals' march to welcome Brigadier General Stanisław Grzmot-Skotnicki. Then, a field mass was held in the courtyard of the Bartosz Głowacki Barracks. After the mass, the commanders of both units swore their soldiers on the standards. Later, Colonel Wojciech Stachowicz performed the act of awarding the regiment's commemorative badge to the city of Bydgoszcz. The badge was received by Mayor Leon Barciszewski, who then presented the regiment with the city's coat of arms. After the decoration, a young Poleshuk, Tomasz Hryciuk, who had arrived at the regiment's invitation with Maria Hryciuk from Zamroczyn, in the Stolin district, gave a heartfelt thank-you speech to the soldiers and officers for their care. The regiment had supported the school in that village. The ceremony concluded with a parade.

Personal composition and organizational structure in March 1939
Regiment commander	Colonel Wojciech Stachowicz
First deputy commander	Lieutenant Colonel Jerzy Jan Leonhard
Adjutant	Captain Bogdan Roman Szczerkowski
Medical doctor	Second Lieutenant Bolesław Januszewski
Veterinary doctor	Second Lieutenant Romuald Hayder
Reconnaissance officer	Captain Wacław Kosmowski
Second deputy commander (quartermaster)	Major Leon August Jan Rzepecki
Mobilization officer	Captain Stefan Dumało
Deputy mobilization officer	Captain Zdzisław Michał Dmowski
Administrative and material officer	Captain Stanisław Sidorenko
Economic officer	Second Lieutenant Michał Pracki
Food officer	Sergeant Ignacy Frąckowiak
Platoon commander (communications)	Captain Czesław Berezowski
Platoon officer	Second Lieutenant Józef Siwek
Non-commissioned officer school commander	Second Lieutenant Zygmunt Zublewicz
Platoon commander	Second Lieutenant Mieczysław Silkowski
Platoon commander	Second Lieutenant Stefan Luśniak
Platoon commander	Second Lieutenant Jerzy Kazimierz Makowski
First squadron commander	Major Wiktor Wątorski
First battery commander	Captain Jerzy Bugajski
Platoon commander	Second Lieutenant Ksawery Dokurno
Second battery commander	Captain Stefan Józef Dębski
Platoon commander	Second Lieutenant Jan Władysław Krajewski
Second squadron commander	Major Zygmunt Wituński
Fifth battery commander	Captain Stefan Marian Świerczyński
Platoon commander	Second Lieutenant Kazimierz Marian Adam Zimnal
Sixth battery commander	Acting Second Lieutenant Apoloniusz Zawilski
Platoon commander	Second Lieutenant Wiesław Adam Annusewicz
Third squadron commander	Major Walery Krzyżyński
Seventh battery commander	Captain Andrzej Szwejkowski
Eighth battery commander	Captain Stanisław Taczanowski
Platoon commander	Second Lieutenant Aleksander Kułakowski
Assigned	Second Lieutenant Stefan Bancer
In training	Captain Aleksander Kostrowicki

== 15th Light Artillery Regiment in the September Campaign ==
=== Mobilization ===
The 15th Light Artillery Regiment, during the alarm mobilization in the blue group, mobilized its organic subunits on wartime staffing in Bydgoszcz on August 24 from 08:00 AM, within the time frame from A+24 to A+54, as a mobilizing unit. Additionally, according to the mobilization plan "W", it formed subunits for its parent division in the blue group from A+54 to A+60:

- Horse-drawn transport column No. 812
- Horse-drawn transport workshop No. 809
- Weapon park platoon No. 802

During the requisition of horses, wagons, harnesses, and transport equipment, sabotage was encountered in the areas of Nakło, Mrocza, and Prędocin, primarily from the German-descended population. In the 2nd Squadron, mobilization proceeded without major issues. However, there were shortages of uniforms for some reservists due to delays caused by overloads in the supply depots in Bydgoszcz.

On August 25, the squadrons were dispersed from Bydgoszcz; the 2nd Squadron to Osielsko and Niemcz, the 1st Squadron to Osowa Góra and Czyżkówko. The regrouping of the entire regiment was completed by August 27. The 15th Artillery Regiment headquarters was located in Morzewiec, the 1st Squadron in Jachcice, the 2nd Squadron in the Janowo farm, Smukła Seminary, and the carbide factory, and the 3rd Squadron in Samociążek. Training and team integration of the horses was initiated. On the evening of August 27, the 3rd Squadron was moved to the Luchowo Forestry Lodge, where it arrived on the morning of August 28. By August 30, the 3rd Squadron command had recognized the area of Trzemiętowo as the future operational zone for the squadron. On August 30, an alarm was declared, and the regiment took up combat positions. The 3rd Battery of the 15th Artillery Regiment positioned near Witoldowo, the 2nd Battery near Wojnowo, and the 1st Battery near Osowa Góra. The 3rd Battery of the 16th Artillery Regiment secured an advanced position, providing support to a company outpost from the 61st Infantry Regiment in the village of Nowa Dąbrówka. Observation points were established: the main one in Kruszyn and the forward one in Nowa Dąbrówka. The 2nd Squadron advanced the 4th Battery to the Chmielów area. The 3rd Squadron advanced the 9th Battery to the Wierzchucice and Wierzchucinek area.

=== Combat operations ===
==== Defense of the Bydgoszcz bridgehead ====
On September 1, the 15th Regiment carried out artillery fire on the border region where units of the German 50th Infantry Division had infiltrated, in the area of Wiktorówko, Badecz, Wysoka, Łobżenica, and Wyrzysk. The 2nd Squadron of the 15th Regiment fired on the German "Netze" Infantry Brigade near Nakło, halting their movement.

On the morning of September 2, due to lingering fog, the regiment did not fire on German troops but was instead shelled by German artillery at the observation point of the 9/15 Squadron, resulting in some casualties. After the fog lifted, the 3rd Squadron of howitzers shelled two German batteries in the area of Teresin farm and Gliszcz village, forcing them to cease fire and possibly destroying two guns. The 8/15 Squadron shelled two advancing columns of German infantry observed from Trzemiętowo. Around 2:00 PM, the 9/15 Squadron came under inaccurate German artillery fire but managed to return fire with approximately 260 shells before retreating to the main defensive positions. In the evening, the observation post of the 3/15 Squadron was shelled, and at 6:00 PM and 7:00 PM, the 15th Regiment shelled German positions at hill 120.

During the night of September 2–3, the 15th Regiment, excluding the 3rd Squadron, regrouped from Mochle and Morzewiec to positions west of Bydgoszcz to support the 61st and 62nd Infantry Regiments. The 3rd Squadron crossed the bridge at Smuka on the Brda river and provided support to the 59th Infantry Regiment on the northern section from Borówno Lake to Gądecz village. After some adjustments, the 3rd Squadron was reassigned to support the 62nd Infantry Regiment in the Szczutki area, near Łącznica Manor. The 2nd Squadron took up firing positions near Osowa Góra.

On September 3, starting at 07:00 AM, the German 50th Infantry Division attacked the Bydgoszcz bridgehead three times in the Tryszczyn and Szutki area. The 3rd Squadron of the 15th Regiment effectively shelled German infantry in the Mochle and Wojnowo areas. On the Tryszczyn-Wojnowo road, concentrated fire from the 3rd and 1st Squadrons destroyed many German trucks transporting infantry and supplies. The 1st Squadron shelled the Nakło-Bydgoszcz road, while the 2nd Squadron fired towards Wtelno and Koronowo. In the morning, German artillery heavily shelled the infantry's defensive positions. The 8/15 Squadron destroyed a German observation post and vehicles carrying infantry. In the afternoon, the 2nd Squadron's positions were detected by a German reconnaissance aircraft and shelled by German artillery, while the observation post of the 1st Squadron and its ammunition column were bombed. The 1st Squadron lost several gunners and horses.

The 3rd Squadron supported the defense of the 59th Infantry Regiment and the Bydgoszcz Home Defense Battalion on the northern sector, with the 7/15 Squadron contributing to the repulsion of German attempts to cross the Brda river. Starting in the afternoon, the 9/15 Squadron shelled German positions. At 09:00 AM, a diversionary attack in Bydgoszcz was launched. To suppress the rebellion, a 50-man unit was formed from the supply and transport departments of the 15th Regiment. During the night of September 3–4, the 15th Regiment began its retreat. The regiment's supply department, as well as all retreating batteries of the 3rd Squadron, lost several wounded soldiers and horses. The 9/15 Squadron suffered heavy losses and was forced to fight near the Bydgoszcz Canal bridge, actively engaging in countering the diversion. The 1st and 2nd Squadrons retreated through Lisi Ogon and Drzewice to Białe Błota. The 2nd Squadron was attacked by diversionary groups, and the 5th Battery suffered personnel losses and lost communication equipment, while the 6th Battery lost several wounded gunners and horses.

The regrouping towards Toruń, initiated in the afternoon of September 3, was completed by the morning of September 4. At noon on September 4, the 2/15 Squadron shelled marching German infantry and transport columns on the road from Kruszyn to Pawłówka. Both the 2nd and 1st Squadrons later shelled a German motorized infantry unit advancing towards Bydgoszcz. In the afternoon, the 3rd Squadron came under shellfire from Fordon. On the evening of September 4, the regiment continued its retreat. The morning saw the squadrons take up positions: the 3/15 Squadron near Kabat village, the 1/15 Squadron south of Brzoza, and the 2/15 Squadron near Łęgnów and Otorowo.

On September 6, the 2/15 Squadron effectively supported the defense of the 59th Infantry Regiment near Łęgnów against the German 50th Infantry Division's attack. Meanwhile, the regiment's signal troops engaged in skirmishes with diversionary groups cutting the telephone lines, resulting in several telephone operators from the 4th Battery being killed. Near Piecki and Emilianowo, the 3/15 Squadron supported the 62nd Infantry Regiment in its fight against the German 50th Infantry Division. In the Brzoza area, the 1/15 Squadron supported the defense of the 61st Infantry Regiment. The artillery barrage by the squadron on an intersection near the church in Brzoza destroyed German infantry columns and transport. In the evening, the 2/15 Squadron's fire on a German infantry unit preparing to attack a position held by the 3/61 Battalion led to its disbandment. At 4:00 PM, the 50th Infantry Division attacked through the forests, breaking into the defense of the 62nd Infantry Regiment in Emilianowo. The artillery batteries were unable to provide effective support due to the cutting of 300 meters of telephone cable by the diversionary groups.

==== Retreat operations ====
On the night of September 6/7, the 15th Artillery Regiment, alongside the infantry regiments, began its retreat to new positions: the regiment's command and the 1st Squadron moved to Wohorze, the 2nd Squadron to Murzynno, and the 3rd Squadron to Kijewo. In some villages inhabited by German civilians, skirmishes with diversionary forces occurred. In Broniewo village, the 4/15 Squadron shelled a German motorized infantry reconnaissance unit.

On September 7/8, the 15th Infantry Division retreated to defensive positions along the line of the Tążyna river, the northern edge of Lake Gopło, and the Parchański and Bachorze canals. At 4:30 PM, the 3/15 Squadron effectively shelled a German motorized infantry reconnaissance unit attacking the 1st/59th Infantry Regiment. During the night of September 8/9, the 15th Regiment, together with the infantry regiments, continued its retreat along the following routes: the 2/15 Squadron with the 59th Infantry Regiment moved to the area of Kąkowa Wola and Miechowice, defending the direction towards Osięciny; the 3/15 Squadron, alongside the 62nd Infantry Regiment, took positions from Kąkowa Wola through Redecz Kalny to hill 100; and the 1/15 Squadron, with the 61st Infantry Regiment, reached the area from the Zgłowiączka river to Redecz Kalny. On this day, the regiment had no combat contact with German units.

On the following night, the retreat continued, and by the morning of September 10, the 1/15 Squadron, with the 61st Infantry Regiment, took up defensive positions along the section from Chodecz to Borzymowice Manor. At the same time, a battery from the 3/15 Squadron, alongside the 1st Battalion of the 61st Infantry Regiment, was assigned to defend Izbica Kujawska. The 2/15 Squadron, with the 59th Infantry Regiment, organized defense along the section from Krukowo to Wilkowiczki. The 3/15 Squadron set up positions at Bogdanowo Manor.

The 3/15 Squadron was withdrawn from Izbica to the Wola Adamowa area. The remainder of the 1/15 Squadron was in reserve at a position near Janowo Nowiny estate. The 3/15 Squadron was stationed at Bodzanowo estate, while the 9/15 Squadron was stationed at Franciszkowo estate near Lubraniec.

==== Battle for Southern Kuyavia ====
On September 11 in the afternoon, units of the German 50th Infantry Division conducted a reconnaissance by combat of the 59th Infantry Regiment's positions, which were repelled with the support of the II/15 artillery regiment. At 1:30 PM, the 62nd Infantry Regiment, supported by the III/15 artillery regiment but without the 9/15 artillery regiment, launched an assault on hill 99.0, Świerkowo, Nakonowo, and Gołaszewo. The III artillery regiment's howitzer fire was concentrated on hill 99.0, followed by a pursuit fire towards Nakonowo. The assault was successful; the 62nd Infantry Regiment reached the German flank and attacked a German heavy artillery regiment in march. Around 5:00 PM, on the II/61 Infantry Regiment's sector near the Szczytno manor, units of the German 208th Infantry Division, supported by heavy artillery, conducted reconnaissance by combat. The German actions were repelled by fire from the 2/15 artillery battery, and later by the entire I artillery regiment.

On September 12 at noon, the German 208th Infantry Division launched an assault on the defensive positions of the 61st Infantry Regiment and the 86th Infantry Battalion, supported by the I/15 artillery regiment, but this was repelled. A renewed attack at 1:00 PM led to the capture of Szczytno, but a counterattack by the 61st Infantry Regiment pushed the German infantry back to their starting positions. At 3:00 PM, German infantry from the 208th Division, with strong artillery support, launched an attack towards the Niemojewo estate, which was repelled by the combined efforts of the infantry and the I/15 artillery regiment. Several cannoneers and one officer were wounded, and the German artillery destroyed one of the guns in the 1st battery. At 3:00 PM, the 208th Infantry Division also attacked the defense of the I/59 Infantry Regiment; the II/15 artillery regiment played a significant role in repelling this assault, though it lost four killed and sixteen wounded.

Under the cover of the 86th Infantry Battalion and the supporting 5/15 artillery battery, the 15th Infantry Division withdrew in the evening and during the night to the next defensive line. The III/15 artillery regiment, along with the 59th Infantry Regiment, moved to the forest east of Łanięta. The I/15 artillery regiment, along with the 61st Infantry Regiment, moved to the Sujki manor, while the regiment's command relocated to the Strzałki manor. The II/15 artillery regiment, without the 5/15 battery, along with the 62nd Infantry Regiment, defended the line along the Lubieńka river to protect the 27th Infantry Division from the south.

On the morning of September 13, the 5/15 artillery battery, along with the 86th Infantry Battalion, defended a crossing over the Lubieńka River in Kępa Szlachecka. The II/62 Infantry Regiment, with the II/15 artillery regiment, successfully defended the Czerniewice-Grabkowo sector against an assault by a unit from the German 50th Infantry Division. The II/15 artillery regiment conducted a night march to the village of Lubieniek, southeast of Gostynin. In their new positions, the 15th Artillery Regiment received its final resupply of ammunition and supplies.

==== Participation in the battle of the Bzura ====
On September 14, the 15th Artillery Regiment, together with its parent division, began repositioning towards Gąbin. At 4:00 PM on that day, the 59th Infantry Regiment, supported by the II/15 artillery regiment and the 15th Field Artillery Battalion, launched an assault on Dobrzyków, held by units of the German 3rd Infantry Division. After initial successes, the 59th Infantry Regiment was pushed back to its starting positions. The lack of central artillery control, its fragmentation due to insufficient communication means, led to ineffective artillery use. The III/15 artillery regiment reached the Zofiówka area and, after taking up firing positions, began targeting Dobrzyków.

During the night march from September 15 to 16, the 15th Artillery Regiment repositioned to Budy Stare and Biała Góra. The 3/15 artillery regiment, positioned on the western bank of the Bzura river near Brochów, provided fire against German units on the opposite bank. The battery suffered casualties from German artillery fire, with 2 cannoneers wounded, several horses lost, and a communications cart damaged. The remainder of the 15th Artillery Regiment (without the 3rd, 5th, and 7th batteries) took up positions on the edge of the forest north of Biała Góra, where it continued to fire at German positions, all while being under German artillery fire.

On September 17, after a night march, the 15th Artillery Regiment attempted a crossing near the Witkowice estate. While crossing the ford, the 2/15 and 9/15 batteries came under heavy fire from German artillery. On the right bank of the Bzura river, the 4/15 battery was bombed by 9 German planes, suffering several wounded soldiers and 2 damaged guns. During this attack, the battery split into two parts. One part marched with the infantry towards the Kampinos Forest, while the other remained encircled. The 6/15 artillery regiment also suffered losses from a bombing raid, losing soldiers and horses. The 9/15 artillery regiment also sustained losses in its wagons from German artillery fire.

The 15th Artillery Regiment continued its march towards the village of Famułki Królewskie. The I/15 artillery regiment, near Brochów, deployed its 1st and 3rd batteries to firing positions. At 10:00 AM, an assault by infantry and tanks from the German 4th Panzer Division, supported by aircraft and artillery, targeted the infantry positions. The infantry began to retreat, and the 3/15 artillery regiment lost one gun while covering the infantry. By 3:30 PM, the regiment engaged attacking German tanks, knocking out two. However, the battery was attacked by Ju-87 bombers, losing all its guns and sustaining heavy casualties in killed, wounded, and captured soldiers. Only a small portion of the battery's soldiers managed to retreat.

The 1/15 artillery regiment neutralized several German tanks and, under German fire, withdrew, saving its guns and some of the crews. First Lieutenant Zygmunt Zyblewicz was killed in action. In total, over 40 soldiers from the I artillery regiment were killed, while the remaining survivors marched towards the Kampinos Forest.

==== Fighting in the Kampinos Forest ====
On the night of September 17/18, the 15th Artillery Regiment gathered in the Famułki Królewskie–Myszory area. In the morning, the march along the narrow-gauge railway tracks from Tułowice to Rybitew began. The 15th Infantry Division column was in constant combat with German patrols, outposts, and armored motorized units. The marching column was split, with the command of the I/15 artillery regiment, the 1/15 artillery regiment, and the remnants of the 3/15 artillery regiment detaching. The fate of this part of the I artillery regiment remains unknown, but Major Wiktor Wątorski was killed on September 18 in Wólka Czosnowiecka.

In the Polesie area, the 8/15 artillery battery came under fire from German artillery, suffering casualties and losing many horses. The crews were then used in foot combat in the ensuing chaos. Eventually, with improvised crews, the battery continued to fire at German positions. Due to shortages and the exhaustion of the remaining horses, the battery was forced to abandon its howitzers. A section of the 4th battery, with two guns, joined the 5th battery, also with two guns. Together, they initially marched towards Modlin. During the march, the 5th battery's gun crew was struck by a German shell, killing or severely wounding the entire crew, killing the horses in the harness, and destroying the gun.

In the evening, the 15th Artillery Regiment regrouped near Cybulice with the remnants of five batteries and 10 guns. On September 19, near Palmiry, the 15th Artillery Regiment's command, along with the remnants of the 4th and 5th batteries, and loose gun sections from other batteries, totaling six guns, remained. Lieutenant Colonel Jerzy Leonhard formed two batteries from these units, which defended Palmiry until September 21. During the breakout towards Warsaw on the night of September 21/22, they fired directly to clear the way for their infantry. Several armored vehicles and cars were destroyed. On September 22, Lieutenant Colonel Leonhard formally disbanded the 15th Artillery Regiment, ordered the remaining guns to be dismantled, and directed the soldiers to break through to Warsaw in groups.

On the morning of 20 September, the remnants of the 15th Infantry Division, supported by the 2nd and 6th batteries, attempted to break through Laski towards Warsaw. They encountered resistance from German units of the 1st Panzer Division and elements of the 228th Infantry Division. Both batteries fired indirect fire, then directly at German positions and armored units. During the fighting, the commander of the ammunition column from the I/15 artillery regiment, Captain Kazimierz Rossa, was killed. Due to strong German resistance in that direction, they broke through towards Młociny. Captain Aleksander Kostrowiecki was also killed. The 9th battery, following a different route, successfully broke through to Warsaw.

==== Defending Warsaw ====
From September 19 to 25, soldiers of the 15th Artillery Regiment fought their way to Warsaw. The regiment reached the capital with the following officers: Colonel Wojciech Stachowicz, commander of the 15th Infantry Division's Artillery; Major Stanisław Eysmont, commander of the II/15 artillery regiment; and the battery commanders: Captain Stefan Dębski (2nd Battery), Captain Czesław Berezowski (3rd Battery), Captain Zdzisław Dmowski (6th Battery), and Captain Stanisław Sidorenko (9th Battery).

A total of 33 officers and 681 non-commissioned officers and gunners from the 15th Artillery Regiment, along with 271 horses, 2 light machine guns, 2 howitzers, and 2 cannons, reached the city. They also brought part of the ammunition column from the III/15 artillery regiment. The howitzers and cannons were assigned as supporting weapons to the infantry. A composite infantry battery of 250 artillerymen in 3 platoons was formed, under the command of Captain Dmowski. It was attached to the 61st Infantry Regiment, which took positions along Belwederska, Puławska, Belgijska, and Czerniakowska streets.

The artillerymen with the horses became part of the rebuilt mounted reconnaissance platoons. Despite the departure of the reconnaissance platoons and Captain Dmowski's battery, additional artillerymen and guns arrived. An improvised division of the 15th Artillery Regiment was formed, with 34 officers, 552 gunners, 236 horses, and 5 guns. Major Eysmont became the division commander, with Captain Świerczyński, Captain Sidorenko, and Lieutenant Florentyn Orzeszko as battery commanders. Two more gun sections arrived. On September 26, the division, with 7 guns, took positions at the edge of the sports field on Agrykola Street.

On September 27, three gun sections supported the 61st Infantry Regiment's attack on Wawrzyszew, including Captain Berezowski's dismounted battery. Around 20 gunners were killed during the battle. On September 28, the division moved to Łazienki, where it surrendered its weapons the following day.

==== March battery of the 1st Regiment of Artillery ====
As part of the first wave of general mobilization, a march battery of the 1st Regiment of Artillery was formed by 3 September 1939 at Fort Kniaziewicza, and from September 1 in the barracks of Toruń-Podgórze in the 31st Light Artillery Regiment. Initially, it was commanded by Second Lieutenant Kazimierz Koszarek (reserve), and from August 31 by First Lieutenant Marian Bolesław Mazur (reserve). The battery was equipped with small arms (except for full completion with pistols), horses, and other equipment, but lacked guns. Along with the march battery of the 1st Regiment of Artillery, the battery was subordinated to the commander of the Detached Unit "Toruń", Colonel Aleksander Myszowski.

From September 4 to 6, the march batteries of the 15th and 16th Artillery Regiments in Toruń performed engineering and fortification work and carried out patrol duties. Part of the unit crossed the bridge before its demolition on the morning of September 7, while others crossed using temporary crossings after the bridges were blown up. The batteries then crossed with the attached ammunition column of the destroyed 27th Artillery Regiment from Tuchola Forest.

The two batteries marched on foot through Służewo, Radziejów, Brześć Kujawski to Włocławek, where they arrived on September 9. Before reaching Brześć Kujawski, they fought off a sabotage group, defeating them. They then marched through Kowal, Gostynin, and Gąbin to Sochaczew, where on September 11, they dismantled a sabotage radio station. On September 12, the artillerymen of both march batteries participated in protecting the left flank of the assault on Sochaczew. In the evening, the batteries marched through the Kampinos Forest to Modlin, arriving there on September 14.

After a rest in Modlin, they continued via Jabłonna and reached Warsaw on September 15. As part of Lieutenant Mazur's unit, the march batteries became part of the 1st Infantry Artillery Battalion, under Captain Ehrlich, starting on September 20. Two combat batteries were formed from the 15th and 16th Artillery Regiment march batteries.

From September 25, the infantry artillery battalion was deployed as infantry to fight in Mokotów. Several soldiers were killed due to artillery shelling and airstrikes. The batteries did not directly engage in combat before the capital's surrender, due to the low enemy activity in this sector.

=== 15th Artillery Regiment's Surplus Collection Unit ===
After the conclusion of the alarm mobilization, the Surplus Collection Unit of the 15th Artillery Regiment was organized under the command of Major Zygmunt Wituński. Additional soldiers arrived to the unit after the announcement of the general mobilization. A total of 450 soldiers were gathered in the 15th Artillery Regiment's barracks. About 250 of them, along with the officers and non-commissioned officers of the regiment, were loaded onto a train and sent to Skierniewice on September 2, where they were assigned to the newly established 8th Light Artillery Reserve Center. The further fate of the surplus 15th Artillery Regiment is unknown. It is only known that part of the unit retreated to the eastern regions of Poland, as some officers from the Surplus Collection Unit are listed among those executed at Katyń.

Organizational structure and personnel in September 1939
Command
Regiment commander	Lieutenant Colonel Jerzy Leonhard
Adjutant	Captain Stanisław Taczanowski
Reconnaissance officer	Lieutenant Ksawery Dokurno
Communications officer	Lieutenant Mieczysław Silkowski (until 2 September 1939) Second Lieutenant Józef Siwek
Liaison officer	Lieutenant (reserve) Wacław Suligowski
Observation officer	Lieutenant (reserve) Kulesza
Weapons officer	Second Lieutenant Józef Siwek (until 2 September 1939) Lieutenant (reserve) Antoni Lauferski
Topographic and fire platoon commander	Second Lieutenant Stefan Luśniak
Head of the office	Senior Sergeant Jan Jankowiak
First battalion
Battalion commander	Major Wiktor Wątorski
Adjutant	Lieutenant (reserve) Jan Karwicki (until 2 September 1939) Lieutenant Mieczysław Silkowski
Reconnaissance officer	Lieutenant (reserve) Tadeusz Krzyżanowski
Observation officer	Second Lieutenant Stefan Bancer
Liaison officer	Second Lieutenant (reserve) Zbigniew Śmielecki
Communications officer	Lieutenant (reserve) Władysław Sass
Ammunition column commander	Captain (reserve) Kazimierz Rossa
1st battery commander	Lieutenant Zygmunt Zublewicz
Reconnaissance officer	Lieutenant (reserve) Zygmunt Pawlicki
Fire officer	Second Lieutenant Jerzy Makowski
2nd battery commander	Captain Stefan Dębski
Reconnaissance officer	Second Lieutenant Pantaleon Schultz
Fire officer	Second Lieutenant Jan Krajewski
3rd battery commander	Captain Czesław Berezowski
Reconnaissance officer	Lieutenant (reserve) Bolesław Szłyk
Fire officer	Second Lieutenant (reserve) Tadeusz Zieliński
Second battalion
Battalion commander	Major Stanisław Ejsymont
Adjutant	Second Lieutenant (reserve) Czeslaw Jankowski
Reconnaissance officer	Lieutenant Konstanty Grzywna
Observation officer	Lieutenant Aleksander Kułakowski
Liaison officer	Second Lieutenant (reserve) Teodor Koślicki
Ammunition column commander	Lieutenant (reserve) Erwin Stachowiak
4th battery commander	Captain Stefan Świerczyński
Reconnaissance officer	Second Lieutenant (reserve) Czesław Millner
Fire officer	Senior Cadet Eugeniusz Janota
5th battery commander	Captain Aleksander Kostrowicki
Reconnaissance officer	Lieutenant Zbigniew Koraszewski
Fire officer	Second Lieutenant (reserve) Zygmunt Plutecki
6th battery commander	Captain Zdzisław Dmowski
Reconnaissance officer	Unknown
Fire officer	Second Lieutenant Kazimierz Zimnal
Third battalion
Battalion commander	Major Mieczysław Para
Adjutant	Lieutenant (reserve) Kazimierz Stojewski
Reconnaissance officer	Second Lieutenant (reserve) Stanisław Prosiński
Observation officer	Lieutenant (reserve) Julian Kabaciński
Liaison officer	Sergeant Ignacy Frąckowiak
Communications officer	Second Lieutenant Józef Kubicki
Ammunition column commander	Lieutenant (reserve) Bernard Schrötter
7th battery commander	Captain Andrzej Szwejkowski
Reconnaissance officer	Second Lieutenant (reserve) Jan Kaczmarek
Fire officer	Second Lieutenant (reserve) Józef Dworzak
8th battery commander	Lieutenant Apoloniusz Zawilski
Reconnaissance officer	Second Lieutenant (reserve) Stefan Szuchiewicz
Fire officer	Lieutenant (reserve) Jerzy Łukasiewicz
8th battery commander	Captain Stanisław Sidorenko
Reconnaissance officer	Second Lieutenant (reserve) Zygmunt Stawiński
Fire officer	Second Lieutenant (reserve) Henryk Sikorski (until 9 September 1939) Second Lieutenant (reserve) Henryk Kabaciński

== Regimental symbols ==
=== Standard ===
On 19 June 1938, in Toruń, Marshal of Poland, Edward Rydz-Śmigły presented the unit with a standard funded by the people of Bydgoszcz. The awarding of the standard and approval of its design were included in the Secret Addendum No. 6 to the Ministry of Military Affairs Orders Journal, dated 17 February 1938, No. 3, item 26.

The standard was made according to the design specified in the Decree of the President of the Republic of Poland dated 24 November 1937 on military and naval insignia, published in the Journal of Laws of the Republic of Poland No. 5 on 28 January 1938. On the right side of the flag, there was a maroon cross, at the center of which was an embroidered eagle surrounded by a laurel wreath. On the white fields, between the arms of the cross, were the number 15, in smaller laurel wreaths.

=== Commemorative badge ===
On 28 May 1926, Major General Daniel Konarzewski, on behalf of the Minister of Military Affairs, approved the design and statute of the commemorative badge of the 15th Field Artillery Regiment.

The badge, measuring 57x38 mm, is diamond-shaped, covered in dark green enamel against a backdrop of crossed artillery barrels of a silvery color. In the center, on a decorative cartouche of patinated silver framed by laurel branches, the number and initials 15 PAP (15th Field Artillery Regiment) were inscribed. The badge was two-piece – for officers, made of silver or gilded tombac and enamelled. It was designed by Wiktor Gontarczyk from Warsaw. In 1939, the initials were changed from PAP to PAL.

== Soldiers of the regiment ==
=== Regiment commanders ===
- Lieutenant Colonel Anatol Kędzierski (since 19 January 1919)
- Major Władysław Sczaniecki (since 5 March 1919)
- Lieutenant Colonel/Colonel Rudolf Niemira (since 8 October 1919)
- Acting Lieutenant Colonel Leon Zubrzycki (since 8 April 1927)
- Colonel Stefan Maleszewski (June 1927 – January 1931)
- Colonel Brunon Romiszewski (January 1931 – December 1934 → Deputy Commander of the Wilno Army Reserve)
- Lieutenant Colonel/Colonel Wojciech Stachowicz (January 1935 – August 1939 → Commander of the Division Artillery of the 15th Infantry Division)
- Lieutenant Colonel Jerzy Jan Leonhard (24 August – September 1939 → German captivity)

=== Deputy commanders of the regiment ===
- Lieutenant Colonel August Trzos (1923 – May 1925 → Commander of the 10th Artillery Battery)
- Lieutenant Colonel Olgierd Ludwik Mierkowski (June 1925 – November 1926)
- Lieutenant Colonel Leon Zubrzycki (October 1926 – November 1927)
- Major/Lieutenant Colonel Dr. Karol Myrek (December 1927 – March 1929 → Chief of Artillery of the Wilno Army Reserve)
- Major/Lieutenant Colonel Jan Kulczycki (27 April 1929 – 3 November 1934 → Commander of the 26th Artillery Regiment)
- Major/Lieutenant Colonel Stefan Mieczysław Mączyński (15 September 1935 – 1937)
- Lieutenant Colonel Jerzy Jan Leonhard (until 24 August 1939 → Commander of the Regiment)
- Major Leon August Jan Rzepecki (Second Deputy Commander/Quartermaster – 1939)

=== Victims of the Katyn massacre ===
Biographies of the victims of the Katyn massacre are available in databases provided by the Ministry of Culture and National Heritage and the Katyń Museum.

Name and surname	Rank	Profession	Workplace before mobilization	Murdered
Adam Lisiecki	Second Lieutenant of the reserve	Teacher, Master's degree	M. Kopernik High School in Bydgoszcz	Katyn
Jerzy Bugajski	Captain	Professional soldier	-	Kharkiv
Zbyszko Pietruszka	Second Lieutenant of the reserve	Clerk	-	Kharkiv

== Bibliography ==
- "Dziennik Personalny Ministerstwa Spraw Wojskowych" [Personal Journal of the Ministry of Military Affairs]. Biblioteka Uniwersytecka W Poznaniu (in Polish). Warsaw: Ministerstwo Spraw Wojskowych. 1937.
- Dymek, Przemysław (2013). 15. Dywizja Piechoty w wojnie 1939 roku [15th Infantry Division in the 1939 War] (in Polish). Warsaw: Ajaks. ISBN 978-83-62046-49-2.
- Panufnik, Ładysław (1929). Zarys historji wojennej 15-go pułku artylerii polowej wielkopolskiej [Outline of the Military History of the 15th Greater Poland Field Artillery Regiment] (in Polish). Warsaw: Wojskowe Biuro Historyczne.
- Rybka, Ryszard; Stepan, Kamil (2006). Rocznik oficerski 1939. Stan na dzień 23 marca 1939 [Officers' Yearbook 1939. As of 23 March 1939] (in Polish). Vol. 29. Kraków: Fundacja Centrum Dokumentacji Czynu Niepodległościowego. ISBN 83-7188-899-6.
- Satora, Kazimierz (1990). Opowieści wrześniowych sztandarów [Tales of the September Banners] (in Polish). Warsaw: Pax. ISBN 83-211-1104-1.
- Sawicki, Zdzisław; Wielechowski, Adam (2007). Odznaki Wojska Polskiego 1918–1945: Katalog Zbioru Falerystycznego: Wojsko Polskie 1918–1939: Polskie Siły Zbrojne na Zachodzie [Badges of the Polish Army 1918–1945: Catalogue of the Phaleristic Collection: Polish Army 1918–1939: Polish Armed Forces in the West] (in Polish). Warsaw: Pantera Books. ISBN 978-83-204-3299-2.
- Zarzycki, Piotr (2000). 15 Wielkopolski Pułk Artylerii Lekkiej [15th Greater Poland Light Artillery Regiment] (in Polish). Pruszków: Ajaks. ISBN 83-87103-65-9.
- Zarzycki, Piotr (1996). 31 Pułk Artylerii Lekkiej. Zarys historii wojennej pułków polskich w kampanii wrześniowej [31st Light Artillery Regiment. Outline of the Military History of Polish Regiments in the September Campaign] (in Polish). Pruszków: Ajaks. ISBN 83-87103-15-2.
