= Glinianka, Masovian Voivodeship =

Glinianka
- Village
- Location within Poland
- Coordinates: 52°8′N 21°26′E
- Country: Poland
- Voivodeship: Masovian
- County: Otwock
- Gmina: Wiązowna
- Population: 804
- Website: http://www.glinianka.pl

Glinianka [ɡliˈɲanka] is a village in the administrative district of Gmina Wiązowna, within Otwock County, Masovian Voivodeship, in east-central Poland.
