= 15th Infantry Division (Poland) =

15th "Greater Poland" Infantry Division (Polish: 15 Wielkopolska Dywizja Piechoty) was a unit of the Polish Army in the interbellum period. Founded on February 17, 1920, and based on the 2nd Greater Poland Rifles Division, it actively participated in the Polish-Soviet War, including the Kiev offensive (1920), and the Battle of Warsaw. After Polish victory, the Division pushed the Red Army out of northern Mazovia. It then fought in the Battle of the Niemen River.

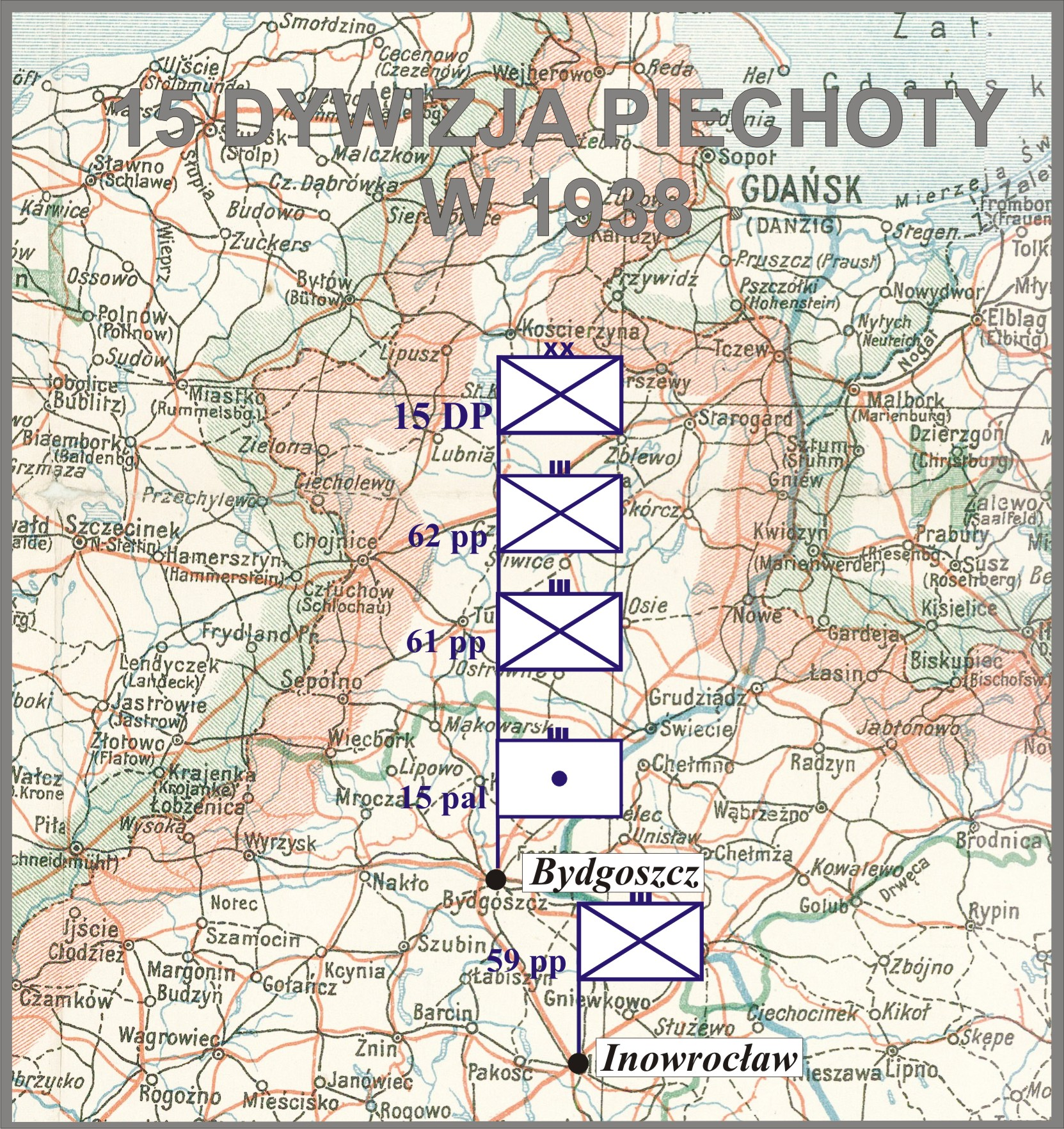
15th Infantry Division in 1938

During the Polish-Soviet War, the division consisted of three brigades:

- XXIX Infantry Brigade (colonel Stanisław Wrzaliński)
- XXX Infantry Brigade (colonel Tadeusz Gałecki)
- XV Artillery Brigade (general Anatol Kędzierski)

After the conflict, the Division was stationed in Bydgoszcz, with one regiment in nearby Inowrocław. It was commanded by General Wladyslaw Jung (1920), General Wiktor Thommee (1924 - 1926 and 1928 - 1934), and General Zdzislaw Wincenty Przyjalkowski, during the Polish September Campaign.

In August 1939, with prospect of war growing, the division was ordered to defend southwestern sector of the Polish Corridor between Bydgoszcz and Naklo as part of the Pomorze Army. The division was composed of :

- 59e Infantry Regiment
- 61st Infantry regiment
- 62nd Infantry Regiment
- 15th Light Artillerie Regiment

Backed by some field fortifications and located along the Brda river, it successfully defended attacks of the 50th Infantry Division and the Netze Brigade of the Wehrmacht between September 1 and 2. Its rear units, remaining in Bydgoszcz, took part in the Bloody Sunday (1939), on September 3. On the same day, the division was ordered to retreat towards Toruń, continually attacked by the Wehrmacht and the Luftwaffe. Between September 9 and 18, the unit took part in the Battle of the Bzura, covering rear areas of Polish troops. After Polish defeat, the division gathered around Palmiry, with 1500 soldiers still alive. Without heavy equipment, and after several skirmishes with the Germans, the remains managed to reach Warsaw on September 23 (see: Siege of Warsaw (1939)).

== Postwar ==
After the second World War, in 1945, the 15th Infantry Division was reformed as a unit of the Polish People's Army (see pl:15 Dywizja Piechoty (LWP)). In 1955, this division was reformed as the Polish 15th Mechanized Division.

== See also ==
- Polish army order of battle in 1939
- Polish contribution to World War II
- List of Polish divisions in World War II
