= Tryszczyn massacre =

Nazi mass executions near Bydgoszcz, Poland

- Location: 53°13′36″N 17°55′06″E; Tryszczyn, occupied Poland
- Date: Autumn 1939
- Attack type: Mass executions by shooting
- Deaths: approx. 900
- Perpetrator: Selbstschutz

The Tryszczyn massacre was a series of mass executions carried out by German occupiers near the village of Tryszczyn, located about 10 kilometers north of Bydgoszcz. At the turn of September and October 1939, paramilitary Selbstschutz units shot approximately 900 Polish and Jewish residents of Bydgoszcz and surrounding localities in shooting pits along the Brda river, as part of the so-called Intelligenzaktion. The mass executions in Tryszczyn preceded the notorious crime in the Valley of Death, in which most of the intelligentsia of Bydgoszcz was murdered. The Germans also carried out executions near Tryszczyn in the following years of World War II.

== Intelligenzaktion in Bydgoszcz ==
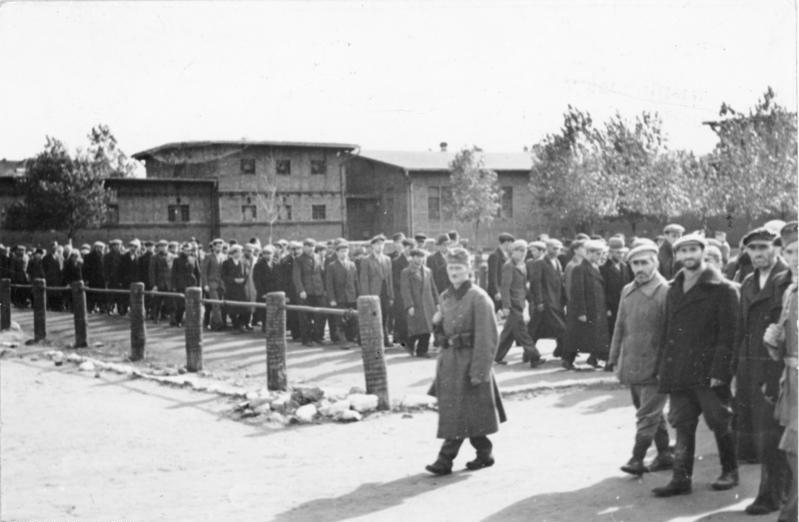
Poles and Jews at the Bydgoszcz internment camp

In the first months of the German occupation, Pomeranian Voivodeship was the part of Poland where Nazi terror took its most brutal form. Even against this backdrop, German repression of the population of Bydgoszcz was especially intense, which made the city one of the symbols of atrocities committed in occupied Poland.

From the first days of the occupation, the Germans carried out mass arrests in Bydgoszcz, targeting teachers, Catholic clergy, civil servants, police officers, military personnel, merchants, craftsmen, and members of organizations promoting Polish identity (such as the Western Polish Union, the Maritime and River League, and the Union of Insurgents and Veterans). Jews were also among those arrested. Most detainees were sent to the Bydgoszcz internment camp (Internierungslager), established on the premises of the 15th Light Artillery Regiment barracks at 147 Gdańska Street. There, the fate of those arrested was decided by a special commission operating at the camp, initially composed of SS men from Einsatzgruppe IV (a special operational group of the SD and security police), and later by officers from the so-called Einsatzkommando 16 who arrived from Gdańsk. The commission, headed by criminal councillor (Kriminalrat) Jakob Lölgen, the head of the Bydgoszcz branch of Einsatzkommando 16, decided which prisoners should be released or expelled to the General Government, sent to concentration camps, or killed on the spot. German women often visited the camp to identify prisoners who had allegedly participated in Bydgoszcz's Bloody Sunday.

== Executions in the Tryszczyn forests ==
The first mass executions carried out in the vicinity of Bydgoszcz as part of Intelligenzaktion took place near the village of Tryszczyn, located about 10 kilometers north of the city. The Germans used the trenches stretching along the banks of the Brda river, which Polish soldiers from the 62nd Infantry Regiment had dug in the local forests and fields before the war began.

The mass murders in Tryszczyn began on 28 September 1939 and lasted until approximately mid-October. Three or even four times a day, trucks brought new groups of prisoners from Bydgoszcz to the execution site, usually consisting of 50–70 people. The vehicles usually stopped near a forester's lodge deep in the forest, from where the condemned were led on foot to the shooting pits. The victims were then ordered to enter the trenches and lie down on the ground in rows of five or six, after which they were shot in the back of the head. During the trial of Richard Hildebrandt, Higher SS and Police Leader in Reichsgau Danzig-West Prussia, it was established that mass executions in Tryszczyn took place on, among others, 1, 3, 5, 7, 9, and 10 October 1939. After the last execution, the perpetrators organized a drinking celebration in a nearby forester's lodge, which they called "the road killers' party".

Only Dr. Jan Rzadkowolski managed to escape execution alive. Thanks to the help of his family and farmers from Tryszczyn, he later managed to flee to Warsaw, where he died during the occupation.

Ewald S., a member of the Bydgoszcz Selbstschutz, interrogated in 1962 by the West German prosecutor's office, described the course of one of the executions carried out in the first days of October 1939. About 100 prisoners from the camp at the 15th Light Artillery Regiment barracks – Poles and Jews – were transported that day in two trucks to the Tryszczyn forests. The condemned had to make their last journey lying down so that the local population would not see them. They were then led in groups of 15 to the shooting pits and killed there. The trucks repeated this journey twice more. Approximately 250 Poles were likely murdered that day. Ewald S. claimed that the execution was carried out by "grey-uniformed members of the Wehrmacht or Gestapo".

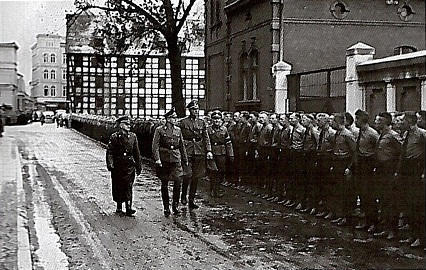
Inspection of a Bydgoszcz Selbstschutz unit; from the left: Josef Meier, Werner Kampe, Ludolf von Alvensleben

During an exhumation carried out in 2009, cartridge cases and bullets from French-made weapons – used in 1939 by soldiers of the Bydgoszcz National Defence battalion – were found in a mass grave near Tryszczyn. It is unlikely that the Wehrmacht or the SS would have carried out executions using weapons manufactured outside Germany, while it is known that members of the Selbstschutz commonly used captured weapons. According to post-war testimony by Josef Meier, one of the commanders of the Bydgoszcz Selbstschutz, the execution squads consisted exclusively of volunteers.

It is difficult to determine precisely how many Poles and Jews were murdered in Tryszczyn in the fall of 1939. Based on a survey conducted in 1945 by the Regional Commission for the Investigation of Nazi Crimes, some historians claim that between 1,400 and 1,500 victims of Nazi terror were buried in six mass graves along the Brda river. However, the mass graves near Tryszczyn also contained, among others, Polish soldiers who died during the fighting in September 1939. The most likely number of victims of the crime committed at the turn of September and October 1939 is approximately 900 people. Based on witness testimonies and the results of exhumations, it was established that the victims included representatives of the Bydgoszcz intelligentsia and clergy, people of Jewish origin, and farmers from nearby villages. Almost 70 Polish scouts and girl scouts were also murdered in Tryszczyn, as well as most of the 370 Jews imprisoned in the barracks of the 15th Light Artillery Regiment (mainly from Dobrzyń nad Drwęcą). Among those murdered were women, elderly people, and even 12-year-old children.

Around mid-October 1939, the Germans ceased carrying out mass executions in Tryszczyn. The shooting pits along the Brda river were already filled with the bodies of victims, and Fordon, located closer to Bydgoszcz, proved to be a much more convenient place for mass murders from a logistical point of view.

== Aftermath ==
From 1945, the Polish authorities conducted an investigation into the events in Tryszczyn. The main witness was Henryk Bolcek, a forester who came to the site of the shootings at night, took measurements, and made sketches. After the war, the burial sites of the victims were identified thanks to his notes. At the turn of April and May 1945, the Polish authorities carried out a partial exhumation of the victims of the crime in Tryszczyn. Three years later, the bodies were exhumed again in order to give the victims a more dignified burial. On 4 May 1948, 128 coffins containing the remains of 693 people murdered by the Germans in Tryszczyn were displayed in the Old Market Square in Bydgoszcz. The coffins were transported and laid to rest at the Heroes' Cemetery in Freedom Hill. It was the last great funeral of the victims of the Nazi occupation of Bydgoszcz.

In October 2009, exhumation work began again at the site of the former mass grave from 1945. At that time, 2,213 bone fragments were recovered, which – as determined by anthropologists from Nicolaus Copernicus University in Toruń – belonged to 48 people. This means that in 1948, during the exhumation, the lowest layer of corpses was left behind. Many small items belonging to the victims were also found, as well as bullets and cartridge cases. The bones were placed in a coffin and buried in the cemetery in Tryszczyn.

== Accountability of the perpetrators ==
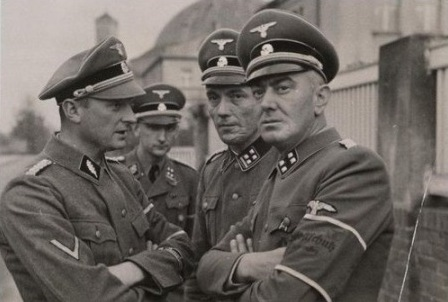
Commanders of the Selbstschutz inspectorates

The leader of the Pomeranian Selbstschutz, Ludolf von Alvensleben, fled to Argentina after the war. Furthermore, according to Dieter Schenk, the West German judiciary deliberately and willingly allowed many criminals to escape punishment. Proceedings against the commanders of the Bydgoszcz Selbstschutz – Erich Spaarmann (head of the inspectorate) and Josef Meier (commander of the district structures, known as "Bloody Meier") – were discontinued in May 1963. In 1965, the Munich public prosecutor's office requested that the prosecution of the former head of the district NSDAP organization and mayor of Bydgoszcz, Werner Kampe, be discontinued, allowing him to continue his business activities as a representative of an insurance company. After the war, Dr. Rudolf Oebsger-Röder from the Bydgoszcz SD served as the head of the West German intelligence residency in Jakarta and worked as a spokesman for Indonesian dictator Suharto.

In 1966, Jakob Lölgen and his deputy, Horst Eichler, stood trial in West Germany. The indictment accused them of causing the death of 349 people, including 74 teachers, 3 doctors, and the mayor of Bydgoszcz, Leon Barciszewski, in an insidious manner and for base motives during the extermination operations in Bydgoszcz. Both defendants were acquitted by a jury, which found that they had acted under duress from their superiors.

== Bibliography ==
- Böhler, Jochen; Mallmann, Klaus-Michael; Matthäus, Jürgen (2009). Einsatzgruppen w Polsce [Einsatzgruppen in Poland] (in Polish). Warsaw: Bellona. ISBN 978-83-11-11588-0.
- Ciechanowski, Konrad (1988). Stutthof: hitlerowski obóz koncentracyjny [Stutthof: Nazi Concentration Camp] (in Polish). Warsaw: Interpress. ISBN 83-223-2369-7.
- Schenk, Dieter (2002). Albert Forster. Gdański namiestnik Hitlera [Albert Forster: Hitler's Danzig Viceroy] (in Polish). Gdańsk: Oskar. ISBN 83-86181-83-4.
- Wardzyńska, Maria (2009). Był rok 1939. Operacja niemieckiej policji bezpieczeństwa w Polsce. Intelligenzaktion [It Was the Year 1939: The Operation of the German Security Police in Poland] (in Polish). Warsaw: Institute of National Remembrance. ISBN 978-83-7629-063-8.
