= Executions in the Valley of Death =

Series of mass executions near Fordon, Poland

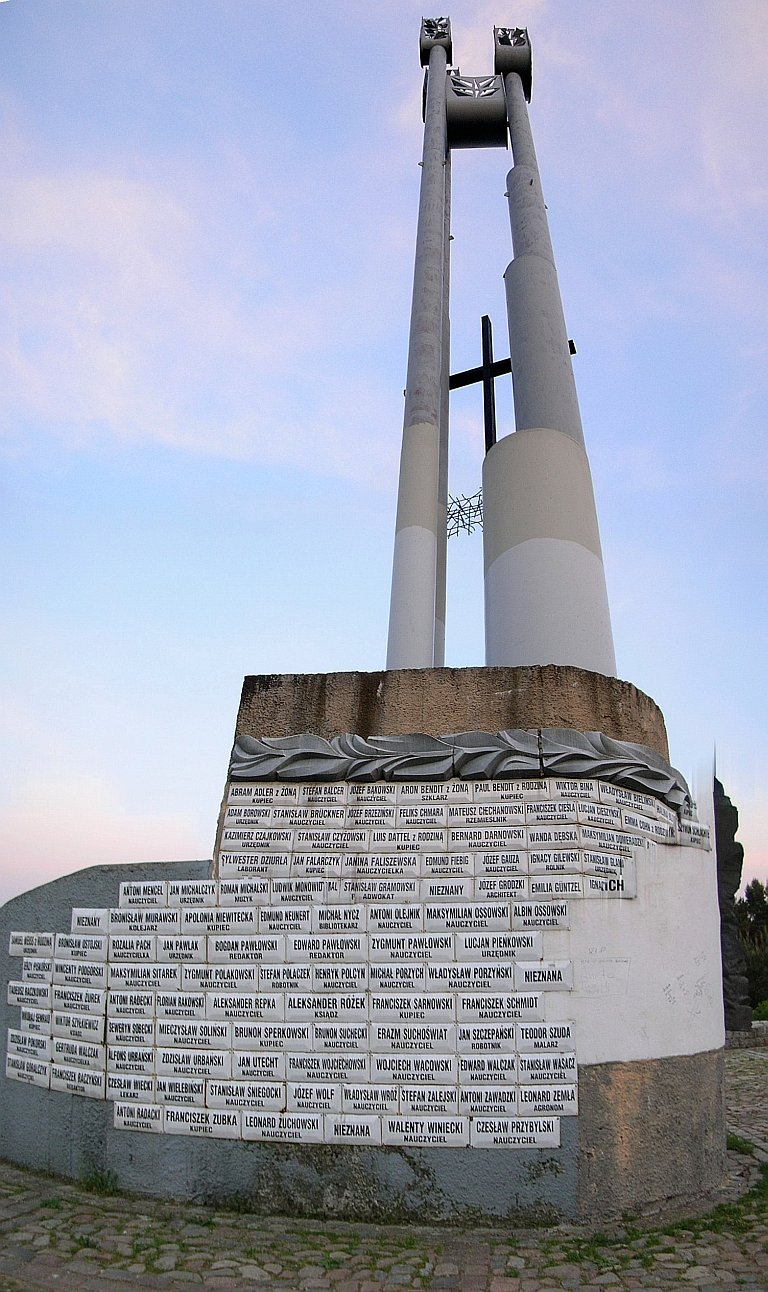
- Monument in the Valley of Death built in 1975
- Location: 53°9′23″N 18°8′5″E; Fordon, Bydgoszcz; Poland
- Date: 1939
- Attack type: mass shooting
- Deaths: 1,200–3,000 people
- Perpetrators: Volksdeutscher Selbstschutz, Einsatzgruppen

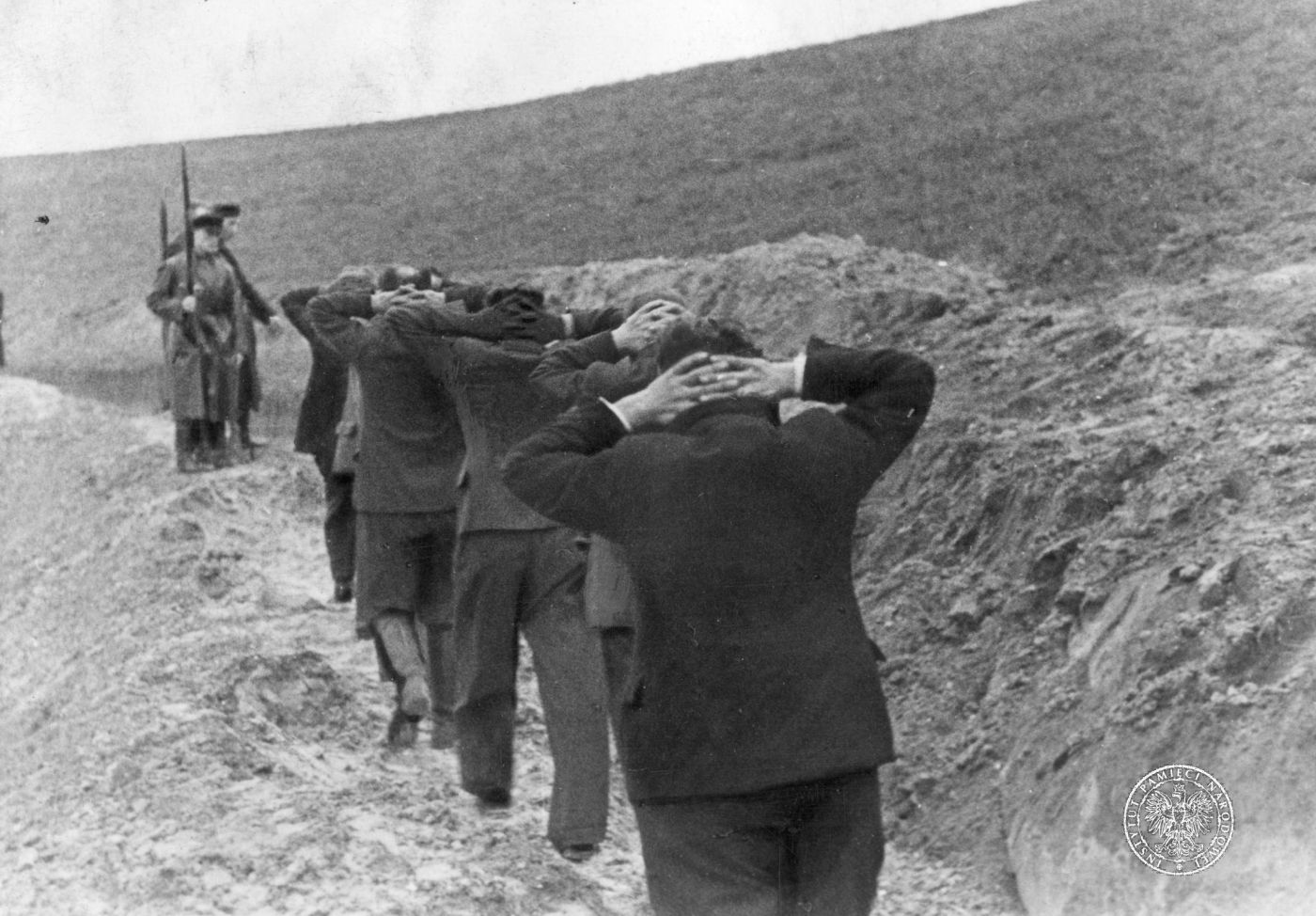
Polish teachers on their way to execution in the Valley of Death

The Executions in the Valley of Death were a series of mass executions carried out by German occupiers in a valley near the town of Fordon (now a district of Bydgoszcz). In this location – later called the Valley of Death – paramilitary members of the Volksdeutscher Selbstschutz and officers of the Einsatzgruppen murdered between 1,200 and 3,000 residents of Bydgoszcz and nearby localities in the autumn of 1939.

Most of the Valley of Death victims were members of the Polish and Jewish intelligentsia, as well as Catholic clergy. Fordon's Valley of Death is the largest mass grave in Bydgoszcz and serves as the most well-known symbol of the martyrdom of the city's inhabitants during World War II.

== Intelligenzaktion in Bydgoszcz ==
In the initial months of the German occupation, Pomerania was the region of Poland where Nazi terror took its most brutal form. Even against this background, the German repressions against the population of Bydgoszcz were exceptionally severe, making the city one of the symbols of German atrocities committed in occupied Poland. Arrests and executions during the early days of the occupation, carried out by Wehrmacht soldiers and members of Einsatzgruppen, initially occurred in a chaotic atmosphere and served as acts of revenge for the so-called Bloody Sunday of 1939 (Bromberger Blutsonntag) and for the resistance put up by the local Civic Guard against the advancing German forces. These repressions later evolved into an organized extermination campaign aimed at eliminating the Polish intelligentsia and leadership class in Bydgoszcz. This was, in fact, only one element of the widespread extermination actions that the German occupiers carried out across Pomerania as part of the so-called Intelligenzaktion.

From late September 1939, a series of German "cleansing operations" took place in Bydgoszcz, targeting specific professional groups, such as teachers and Catholic clergy, as well as social circles and members of organizations and associations promoting Polish culture, including the Polish Western Union, the Maritime and Colonial League, and the Union of Insurgents and Soldiers. Jews were also a primary target of the occupiers.

On 14 October 1939, a roundup of Polish teachers resulted in the arrest of 186 educators. On October 19, a roundup of members of the Polish Western Union led to the arrest of 91 individuals, including 21 women. On October 20, a large roundup near Kujawska Street captured approximately 1,200 people, among whom 27 were identified based on proscription lists, police files, or denunciations by local Volksdeutsche. In November, arrests of Catholic priests began. A wide-reaching "pacification action" (Befriedungsaktion) was conducted on November 11, coinciding with Poland's National Independence Day. This operation, involving 115 groups of Gestapo, Kripo, Schutzpolizei officers, and members of Selbstschutz, resulted in 3,800 detentions.

Most Poles and Jews detained during these operations were sent to the internment camp (Internierungslager) established in the barracks of the 15th Light Artillery Regiment at 147 Gdańska Street. There, the fate of the detainees was determined by a special commission stationed at the camp, initially composed of SS members from Einsatzgruppe IV (a special SD and Sicherheitspolizei task force) and later of members of Einsatzkommando 16 (EK 16), which had arrived from Gdańsk. The 20-person group of Gdańsk SS officers was led by criminal counselor (Kriminalrat) Jakob Lölgen. He worked with a small SD unit within EK 16, led by SS-Sturmbannführer Dr. Rudolf Oebsger-Röder. Lölgen's commission decided which prisoners would be released, deported to the General Government, sent to concentration camps, or executed on the spot. German women would occasionally visit the camp to select individuals for execution by falsely claiming they had participated in Bloody Sunday.

Those sentenced to death were executed without trial in secluded areas near Bydgoszcz. Initially, executions took place in Gdańsk Forest, the woods near Borówno Lake, areas around Otorowo, and especially in trench lines near the village of Tryszczyn. The choice of execution sites depended on factors such as accessibility, proximity to the city, and terrain features. The murders were typically carried out by members of Selbstschutz, a paramilitary formation composed of ethnic Germans living in pre-war Poland. According to post-war testimony from Josef Meier, the head of Selbstschutz in the Bydgoszcz County, the execution squads consisted exclusively of volunteers.

== Crime in the Valley of Death ==
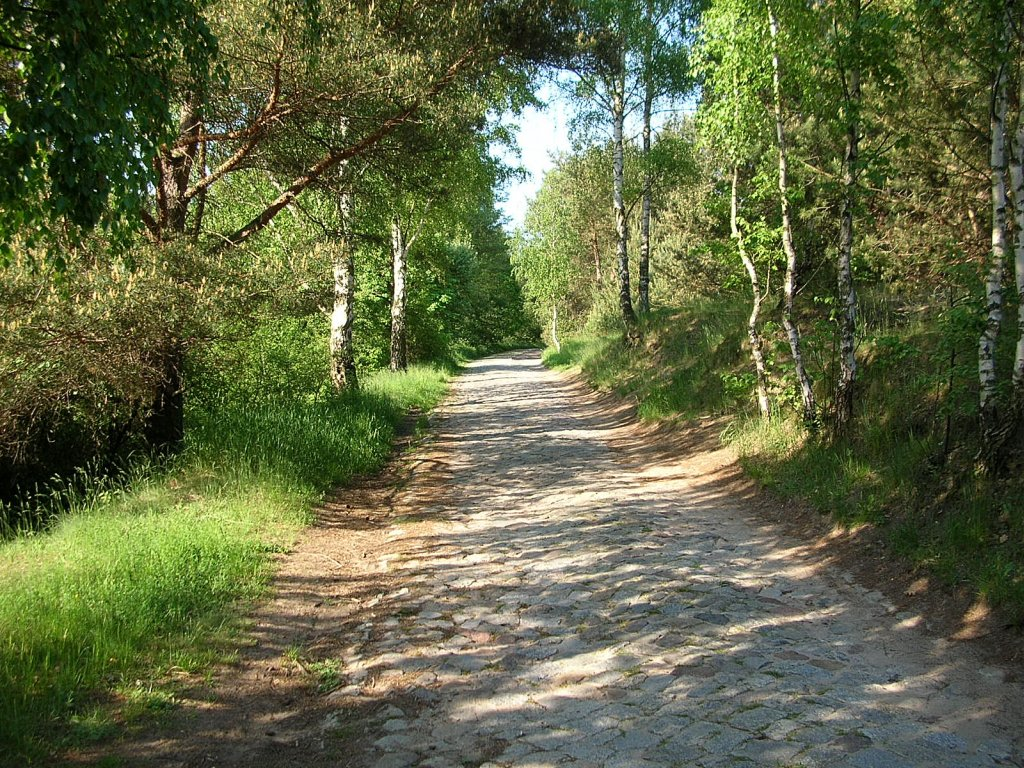
Road in the Valley of Death

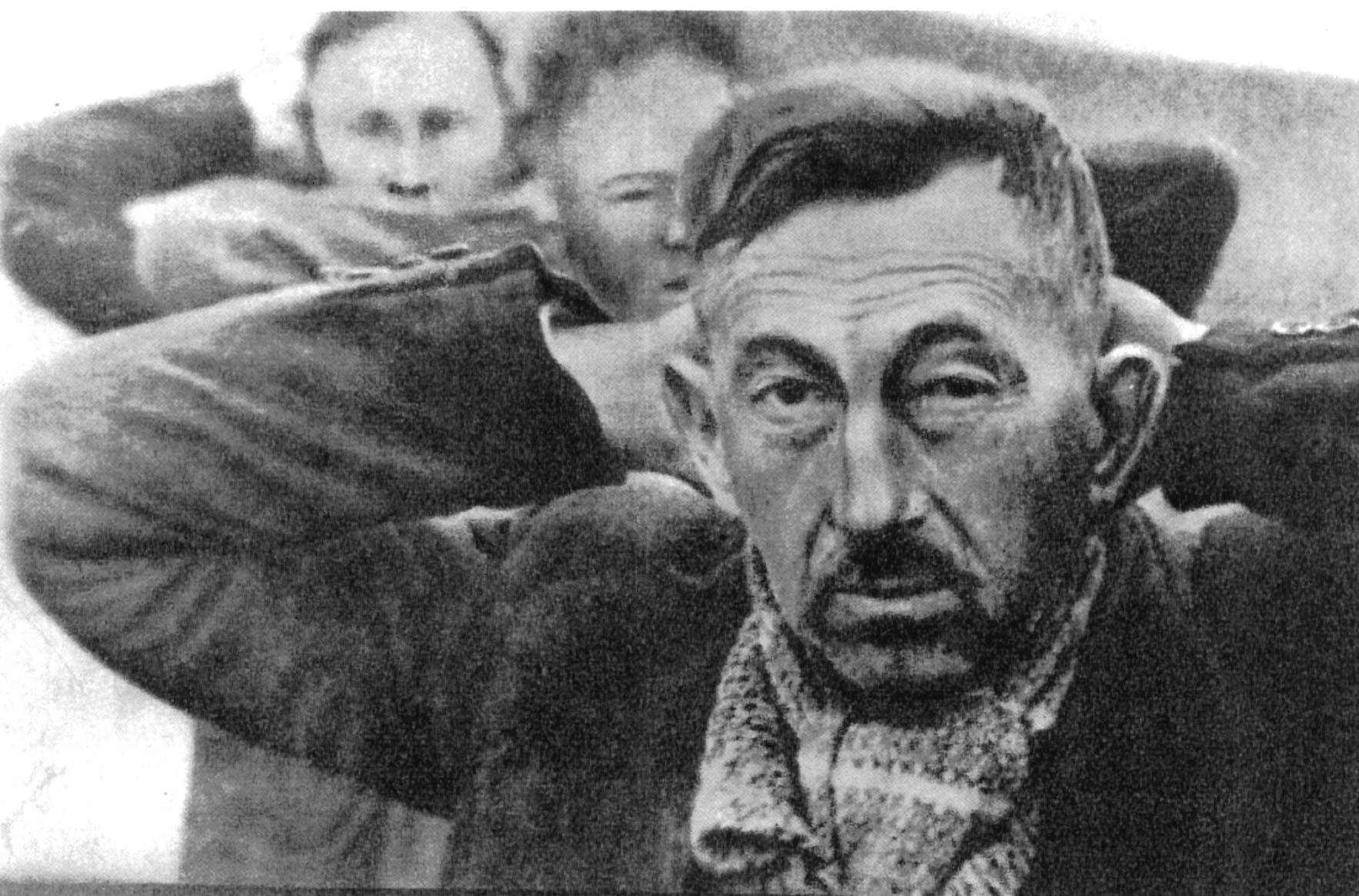
Group of teachers from Bydgoszcz photographed moments before their execution, with Władysław Bieliński in the foreground

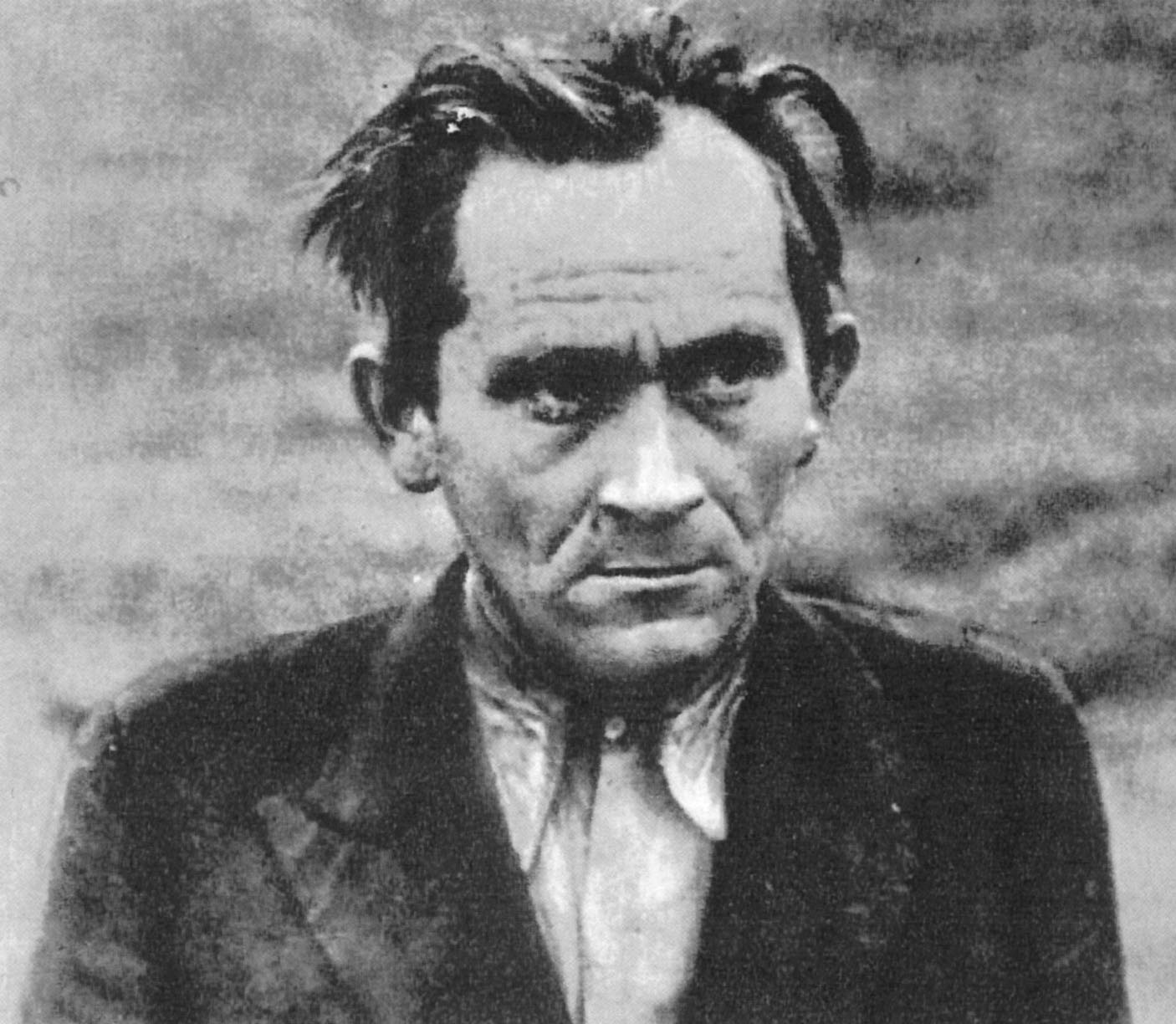
Medard Męczykowski – teacher

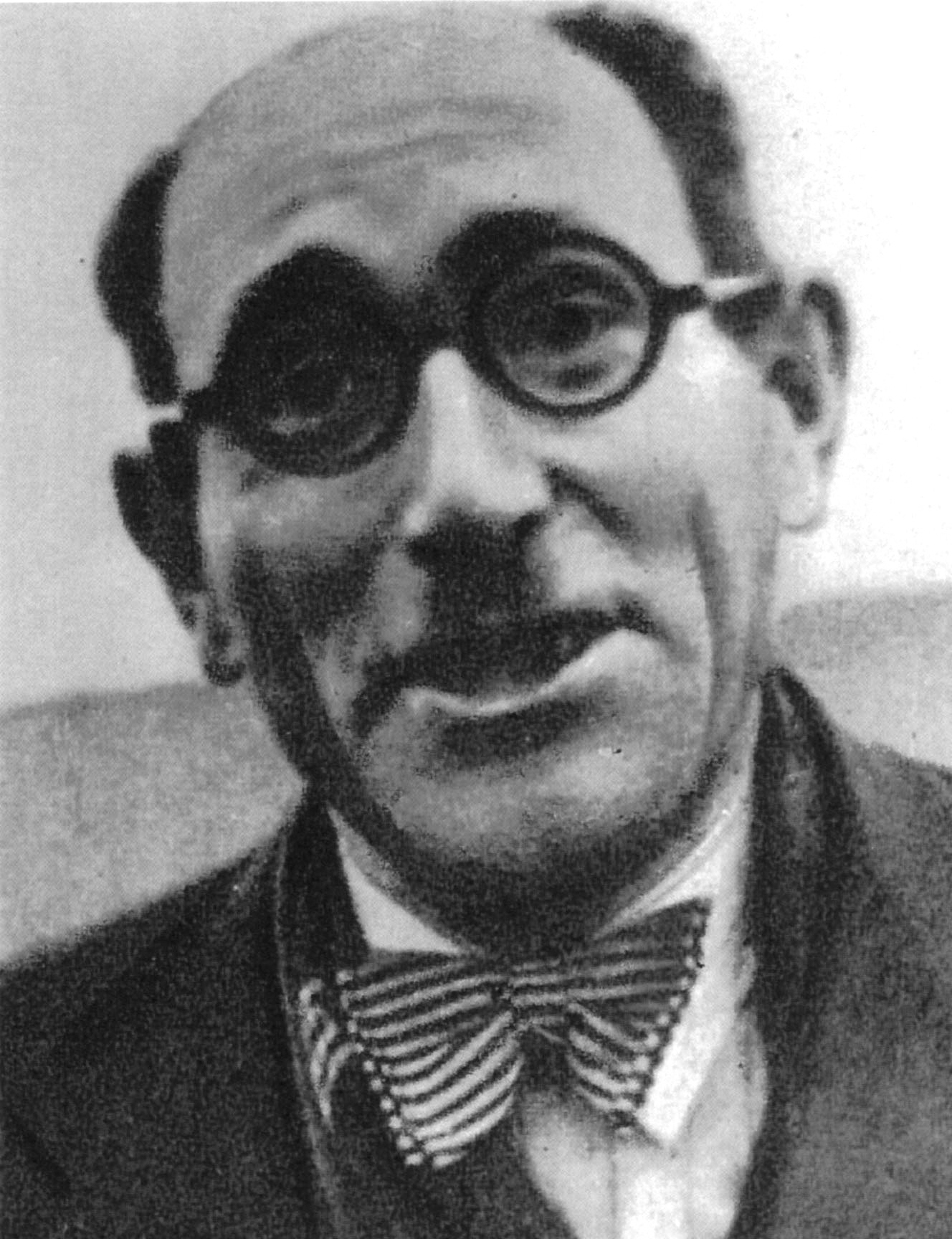
Marian Jurek – teacher

Due to the mass graves in Tryszczyn being filled with bodies, the Germans began searching for a new location for carrying out mass executions. Their choice fell on a valley approximately 12 kilometres (7.5 miles) northeast of Bydgoszcz, near Fordon – now a district of Bydgoszcz, but at the time an independent town. This location was selected mainly for its isolation from human settlements and the terrain, which muffled the sounds of gunfire and made observing the executions difficult. This narrow and winding valley, located between the second and third elevations of the Miedzyń Hills, became known as the Valley of Death. In early October 1939, before the arrival of the first transports of condemned prisoners, a unit of the German Arbeitsdienst appeared in the valley to dig several long trenches, 3 meters wide and 2.5 meters deep. The work lasted several days.

Fordon had already experienced Nazi terror earlier, carried out mainly by members of the local Selbstschutz unit led by Friedrich Walther Gassmann. On 2 October 1939, a public execution was held near the wall of the Fordon church, where Mayor Wacław Wawrzyniak, Prelate Henryk Antoni Szuman, Vicar Hubert Raszkowski, and five other residents were executed. Subsequently, the local Jewish population was exterminated in two executions carried out in the Valley of Death on October 12 and October 19, with an estimated 26 people killed. Alongside the Jews, nurse Stanisława Stawska and her 10-year-old son were executed. Another victim was the four-member Kulpiński family, local merchants, who were shot on October 15. Following their execution, Gassmann took over the Kulpiński residence.

The first execution of Bydgoszcz residents in the Valley of Death took place on 10 October 1939, with subsequent executions continuing until November 11, or, according to some sources, until 26 November 1939.

Victims were transported to the execution site in trucks, often from places of internment like the Bydgoszcz Internierungslager. Upon arrival, prisoners were forced to walk with their hands behind their heads through a gauntlet of guards and execution squads. In a hangar belonging to the former Bydgoszcz Aeroclub, the condemned were stripped of their outer clothing, valuables, and personal belongings. They were then led to the previously dug trenches, where they were executed with gunshots to the back of the head, using pistols or rifles. Machine guns were used relatively rarely. The wounded were finished off with gunshots, rifle butts, or, in some cases, buried alive. After the executions, the perpetrators often celebrated with drinking sprees in nearby Fordon. Testimonies indicate that executions sometimes occurred twice a day or even at night. Adam Gorzkiewicz testified:

I saw two trucks stopping near the German farmer Lawrenz's property, where about a hundred Poles, men and women, were unloaded and led to the hills of the Miedzyń estate. Shortly after, I heard volleys of rifle fire. Executions often took place even at night. After the volleys, the groans of the wounded and dying could be heard.

The execution squads primarily comprised members of Selbstschutz from Bydgoszcz (led by SS-Sturmbannführers Spaarmann and Meier) and Fordon (under the command of Friedrich Walther Gassmann), as well as SS personnel from Einsatzkommando 16's Bydgoszcz branch. The overall supervision of the extermination operation was conducted by Ludolf von Alvensleben, the commander of Pomeranian Selbstschutz.

Historians have been unable to determine the exact number of Poles and Jews murdered in the Valley of Death, partly because no documented records of the Fordon massacre have been found. In an exhumation conducted in 1947, the remains of 306 bodies were recovered. However, it is estimated that between 700 and 1,600 bodies still lie in undiscovered graves in the Valley of Death. Stanisław Bator and Rajmund Kuczma estimated the number of victims at 2,000, while Maria Wardzyńska of the Institute of National Remembrance suggested the number might be as high as 3,000.

As a result of the executions in the Valley of Death, 48% of teachers from Bydgoszcz secondary schools, about 33% of clergy, 15% of primary school teachers, and nearly 14% of doctors and lawyers were killed. Among the victims was Leon Barciszewski, the prewar mayor of Bydgoszcz, who was executed on 11 November 1939. Fordon's Valley of Death remains the largest mass grave in Bydgoszcz and symbolizes the martyrdom of the city's residents.

== After the war ==
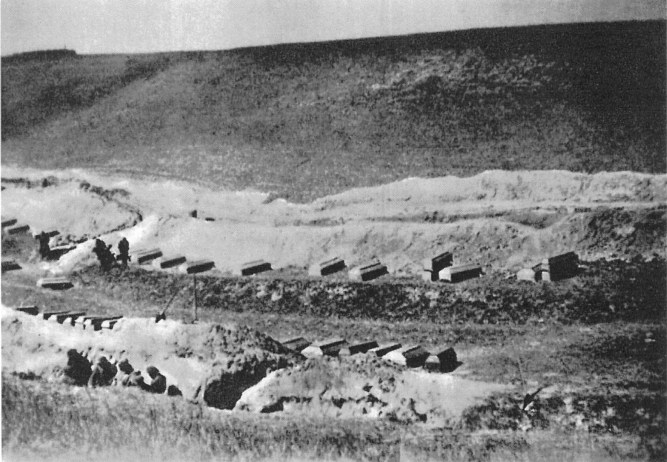
Exhumation of the murdered victims, 1947

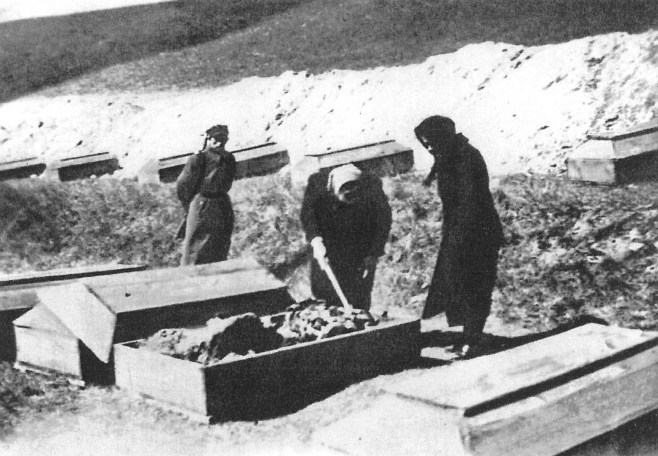
Identification of the bodies exhumed in the Valley of Death

After the extermination campaign ended, the Germans tried to conceal evidence of their crimes by planting trees and shrubs over the mass graves. They also maintained constant surveillance of the Valley of Death, making it impossible to commemorate the victims during the war. Although the execution site was searched as early as 1945, the mass graves were not located until 1947.

The exhumation at the execution site in the Valley of Death took place from April 28 to 2 May 1947, involving 12 committees with 8 judges and 12 doctors, as well as relatives and others capable of identifying the victims. During this process, the remains of 306 bodies were recovered, but only 39 could be identified (identification was hindered by the fact that victims had been stripped of all personal belongings before their execution). A film documenting the exhumation was intended for inclusion in the Polish Film Chronicle.

The exhumation in the Valley of Death was conducted hastily and unexpectedly halted by the Security Office. It was never resumed. This may have been related to the fact that the Security Office also carried out executions in this location after the war (on German prisoners).

On 9 May 1947, the coffins containing the victims' remains were transported to Bydgoszcz's Old Market Square. The following day, a ceremonial funeral was held, after which a procession with the coffins made its way to the Cemetery of the Heroes of Bydgoszcz on Freedom Hill.

Following World War II, interest in the Valley of Death execution site was significant. The parson of St. Nicholas Church, Father Alfons Sylka (who had ties to the Home Army during the war), erected a stone obelisk to commemorate the genocide committed there.

== Responsibility of the perpetrators ==
The majority of those responsible for the crimes in the Valley of Death escaped post-war criminal accountability. Only a few perpetrators faced justice in Polish courts.

Richard Hildebrandt, the senior SS and Police Leader in the Reich District of Reichsgau Danzig-West Prussia, was sentenced to death by a Polish court in Bydgoszcz. The sentence was carried out on 10 March 1951. In the same trial, SS-Brigadeführer Max Henze, who served as the president of the police in Bydgoszcz from 12 October 1939, was also sentenced to death and executed on the same day as Hildebrandt. Eryk Pollatz, an active member of Selbstschutz responsible for, among other crimes, the extermination of Jews from Fordon, was also prosecuted. On 4 July 1947, the Special Criminal Court sentenced Pollatz to death, and the sentence was carried out.

The leader of Pomeranian Selbstschutz, Ludolf von Alvensleben, fled to Argentina after the war. According to Dieter Schenk, the West German justice system consciously allowed many perpetrators to avoid punishment. Proceedings against the leaders of Bydgoszcz Selbstschutz, Erich Spaarmann (head of the inspectorate) and Josef Meier (known as "Bloody Meier", commander of local structures), were discontinued in May 1963.

In 1965, the prosecutor's office in Munich requested the cessation of proceedings against Werner Kampe, the former head of the Nazi Party county organization and mayor of Bydgoszcz. This allowed Kampe to continue his business activities as a representative of an insurance company.

Dr. Rudolf Oebsger-Röder, a member of Bydgoszcz's SD, later served as the head of the West German intelligence residency in Jakarta and worked as a spokesperson for the household of Indonesian dictator Suharto.

In 1966, Jakob Lölgen and his deputy, Horst Eichler, were tried in the Federal Republic of Germany. The indictment accused them of causing the deaths of 349 people in Bydgoszcz during extermination operations, including 74 teachers, 3 doctors, and the mayor, Leon Barciszewski. However, both defendants were acquitted by a jury, which ruled that they acted under orders from superiors.

== Bibliography ==
- Bator, Stanisław; Kuczma, Rajmund (1969). Fordon "Dolina Śmierci" [Fordon "Valley of Death"] (in Polish). Bydgoszcz: Muzeum im. Leona Wyczółkowskiego w Bydgoszczy.
- Böhler, Jochen; Mallmann, Klaus-Michael; Matthäus, Jürgen (2009). Einsatzgruppen w Polsce [Einsatzgruppen in Poland] (in Polish). Warsaw: Bellona. ISBN 978-83-11-11588-0.
- Ciechanowski, Konrad (1988). Stutthof: hitlerowski obóz koncentracyjny [Stutthof: The Nazi Concentration Camp] (in Polish). Warsaw: Interpress. ISBN 83-223-2369-7.
- Jaszowski, Tadeusz; Pyszczyński, Edmund (1975). Fordońska Dolina Śmierci [Fordon's Valley of Death] (in Polish). Bydgoszcz: Urząd Miejski w Bydgoszczy.
- Wardzyńska, Maria (2009). Był rok 1939. Operacja niemieckiej policji bezpieczeństwa w Polsce. Intelligenzaktion [It Was the Year 1939: The German Security Police Operation in Poland – Intelligenzaktion] (in Polish). Warsaw: Instytut Pamięci Narodowej. ISBN 978-83-7629-063-8.
