= Werner Kampe =

War criminal, Bydgoszcz, Poland, World War II

Werner Adolf Kampe
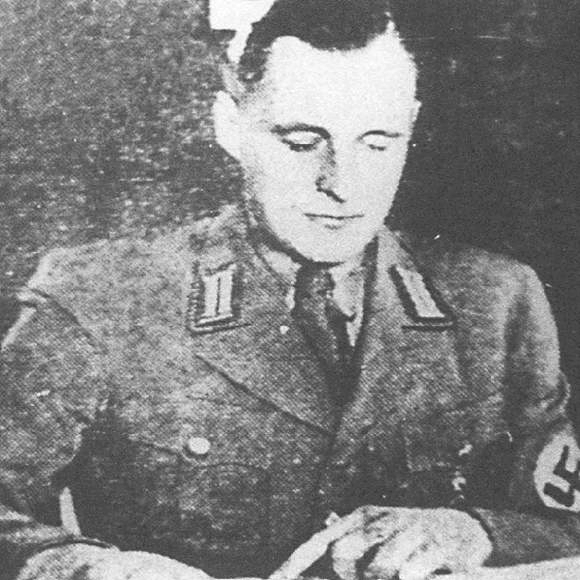
- Werner Kampe in 1939
- Born: 11 May 1911; Nowy Dwór Gdański, German Empire
- Died: 23 May 1974 (aged 63); Hanover, West Germany

Werner Adolf Kampe (1911–1974) was a Kreisleiter of the NSDAP, a SS Hauptsturmführer and a Mayor of Bydgoszcz between September 1939 and February 1941. He was a war criminal, responsible for the murder of Poles and Jews in Bydgoszcz in 1939. He additionally ordered the demolitions carried out in the area of Bydgoszcz Old Town during WWII.

== Life ==
=== Before 1939 ===
Werner Adolf Kampe was born Werner Kamiński on 11 May 1911 in Nowy Dwór Gdański, then called Tiegenhof. He was the eldest son of Adolf Kamiński, a merchant, and Berta née Schwichtenberg. His father was killed in 1918, while fighting on a World War I front. Consequently, his mother, looking for providing sustenance, moved the family from Nowy Dwór Gdański to Berlin then Sopot. Werner attended various schools but was never interested in science: he only managed to receive a basic education.

In 1920, Berta Kamińska remarried Heinrich Freimann, a merchant. Werner stayed at the family's house till November 1927, when he was sent to learn a trade at Ertmann and Perlewitz, a clothing firm in Gdańsk. Here he started a professional career, holding different positions: salesman, branch manager and sales representative.

In October 1930, Werner, aged 19, joined the NSDAP in Gdańsk where his political activity quickly propelled him as the head of the section. In 1932, he lost his position at Ertmann and Perlewitz and found himself unemployed. Although he started to work in his parents' shop in Nowy Dwór Gdański, he had a lot of free time which he dedicated to immerse fully himself into the political activity of the NSDAP. Hence, Werner served in the office of propaganda, in the office of economic affairs and for a time, he even worked as Aide-de-camp to the Kreisleiter. During this period, he joined the SS, where eventually he reached the rank of Hauptsturmführer.

After the Nazi party took power in Germany in 1933, Werner's career lifted off: he took a strong position in the leadership of Gdańsk's NSDAP. In accordance with his skills, he was appointed to the position of manager for economic and financial affairs while also carrying out specific tasks in the political field. The zeal he displayed in his duties was recognised by Albert Forster, Gauleiter of Danzig-West Prussia: in November 1934, Werner was appointed as his Aide-de-camp. From this moment on, he was at the forefront of the leadership of the Nazi party in Gdańsk. This appointment marked the end of personal feuds which occurred within the Gdańsk NSDAP and concluded with the complete victory of Albert Forster and his suite over the president of the Senate of the Free City of Danzig and the deputy gauleiter Hermann Rauschning, who both had to resign.

Kamiński's post as aide-de-camp to Forster helped him to hone his skills in the NSDAP, doctrinally and practically. In 1936, Forster promoted him to the position of Kreisleiter of the Gdańsk County (Polish: powiat gdański). In the same move, he took the post of municipal manager of the real estate administration. This function proved to be a stepping stone for him as in August 1939, he became a government counselor. In 1937, he changed his name "Werner Kamiński" to "Kampe", hence officially turning his back to his Polish roots.

=== Mayor of Bydgoszcz ===
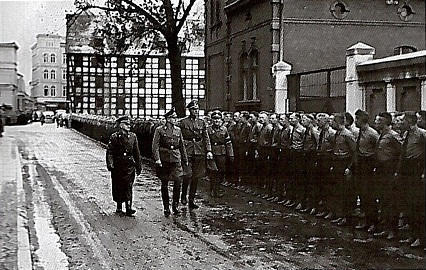
Inspection of a Selbstschutz unit in Bydgoszcz (1939), Kampe is the second from the left

Gdańsk NSDAP saw its role expand with the outbreak of World War II and the subsequent occupation of Pomerania by Nazi troops, covering the entire region renamed Reichsgau Danzig-West Prussia. In this new administrative area, Bydgoszcz was the second largest political and social center. To take over the political and administrative power in that place, only a man from Forster's closest circle could be trusted: the choice fell logically on Werner Kampe, then 28 year old. On 8 September 1939 he was appointed Kreisleiter of Bydgoszcz NSDAP and city commissioner.

At his arriving, Kampe installed himself in the Town Hall, soon creating and managing the local Nazi party. He set his abode in 50 Gdańska street, though he also rented an apartment in the villa at 8a Sielanka, which was close to the seat of Selbstschutz at 7 Ossoliński Alley. He was regularly seen in the city SS headquarters set up at 48 Gdańska street. On 27 October 1939 Werner Kampe was officially appointed Mayor of Bydgoszcz. As soon as 9 and 10 September 1939 he ordered the shooting of 50 inhabitants of Bydgoszcz along the western facade of the Old Market place.

In his position, he had both political and administrative authorities, hence having a crucial influence on the destiny of Bydgoszcz during the beginning of the occupation. He first turned against Dr. Sperling, who, after a stint in Słupsk, came to be mayor of Bydgoszcz by the decision of Wilhelm Frick, the German Interior Minister. Kampe did not yield to him, despite several interventions of high rank officers threatening to use force, and Dr. Sperling moved back to Słupsk. Following this confrontation, he called Albert Forster who used his leverage on Hitler: as a result, not only was Kampe kept in his office, but also the Bydgoszcz Region (German: Regierungsbezirk Bromberg) was attached to his native Reichsgau Danzig-West Prussia and not to the Reichsgau Wartheland as initially planned by the Ministry of Internal Affairs.

Kampe, using the full authority of the Nazi system, held the position of commander over the city's state administration and local government. Additionally, after Hitler's decree of 28 August 1939, he could perform arbitrary actions from his own initiative, without referring to his superiors. A supplemental ordinance of 8 October 1939, incorporating some Polish territory into the Third Reich, gave Kampe - as the mayor - a political role over the "special authorities": he could then influence the local offices of the Gestapo and the SD albeit he did not exercise any official authority over them.

His position combined with the trust he had in his mentor Albert Forster offered Werner Kampe an abusive free rein position in the occupied Bydgoszcz without any fear of consequences. He was responsible for managing Nazi occupation apparatus, setting tasks and ensuring that they were carried out; he was reporting to the Gauleiter everything that was happening in the city. Furthermore, in order to maintain power he acted as an "exemplary Nazi", fanatically implementing NSDAP terror rules.

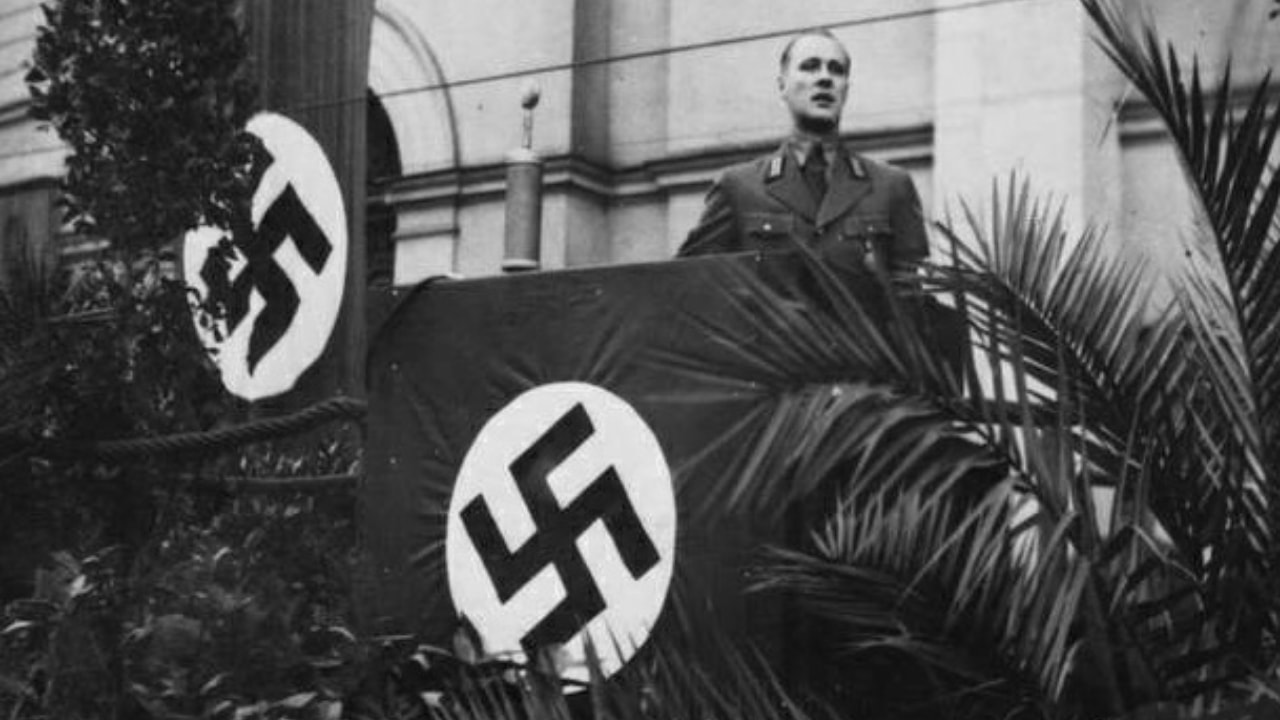
Werner Kampe in 1939 on Old Market Square

In Bydgoszcz, Kampe initially cooperated with the heads of various organized offices:

- Otto von Proeck, a Prussian Junker from Orzysz, for the police;
- Ludolf von Alvensleben for the Selbstschutz;
- Jakob Lölgen then Karl-Heinz Rux for the Gestapo.

Werner's main goals were to transform Bydgoszcz into a German city, organizing there an outpost of the NSDAP by recruiting collaborators, disregarding requests, liquidating Polish associations and press, confiscating radios, cars and fuel, taking over schools, launching propaganda cinemas, detaining the Polish intelligentsia and imposing a curfew from dusk till dawn.

His major objective, however, was to segregate and exterminate the Polish population under his authority in a planned and centrally directed manner. It was originally justified by the need to apprehend the perpetrators of the so-called Bloody Sunday. In fall 1939, with Kampe's active participation, Nazi propaganda created a myth from this event, turning it into a persecution of the Volksdeutsche, which perforce triggered feelings of revenge among the thousands of Nazi officials working in the region and justified the bloody repression against the Polish population.

==== Intelligenzaktion ====
Werner Kampe directed in Bydgoszcz the mass murder of the inhabitants, part of the Nazi global plan Intelligenzaktion aiming at annihilating Polish intelligentsia.

The Intelligenzaktion followed a three-point action program:

- physical elimination of Poles who in the past held managerial positions or who could be potential organizers of a Polish resistance movement;
- deportation from the city of residents who came here from the central parts of the country;
- relocation of "racially valuable" Poles deep into Germany (the point was never fully implemented).

Poles rounded up in the streets or arrested at their homes by the police or Einsatzgruppen were detained in places all over the city, in particular:

- the military barracks;
- the municipal prison at Wały Jagiellońskie street;
- the Gestapo building on Poniatowskiego Street;
- the basement of Kampe's villa at 50 Gdańska street;
- a dedicated room in the town hall.

Some were murdered during interrogations, others taken to the surrounding forests and shot, others put before a special court, which often handed down death sentences. This systemic annihilation of Poles also took the form of pogroms, planned and prepared under the supervision of Kampe, who received reports from Gestapo and SD, detailing ways, means and results of those actions.

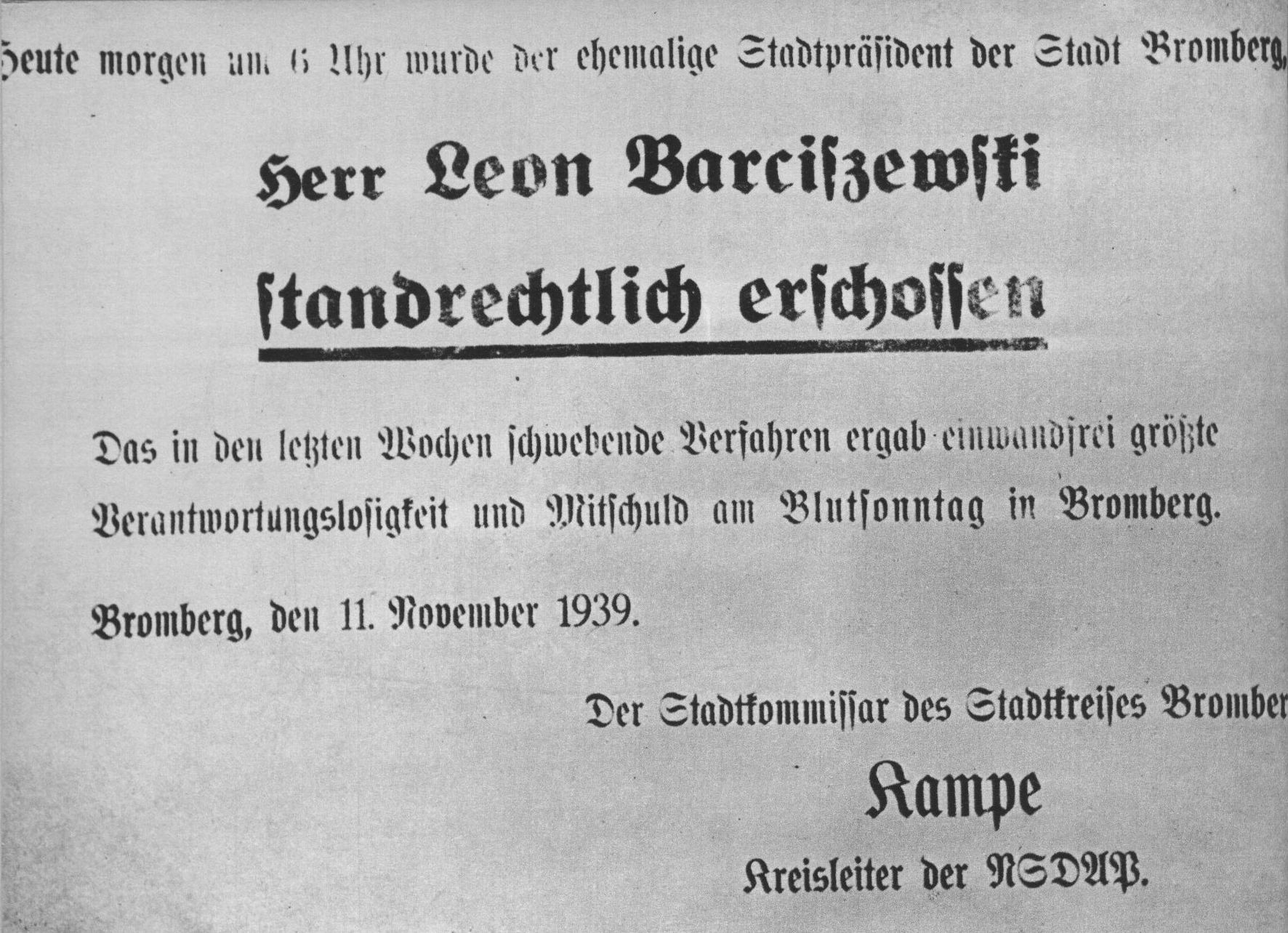
German announcement of the execution of Leon Barciszewski (November 1939)

Werner used all kind of frauds vis-à-vis demobilized Polish intellectuals coming back from the front in 1939. Most of them were executed to various execution sites in the outskirts of Bydgoszcz, among which Tryszczyn (Polish: Zbrodnia w Tryszczynie) and Fordon's Valley of Death (Polish: Dolina Śmierci)).

Kampe personally identified people to be "liquidated", such as Leon Barciszewski, the former mayor, who was shot together with his 18-year-old son intentionally on the Polish commemoration day, on 11 November 1939. Jan Konopczyński, priest of the parish of the Church of Our Lady of Perpetual Help, detained with Leon Barciszewski, witnessed Werner visiting their cell and formally identifying the former mayor and insulting him on the eve of the execution.

Acting as the organizer of round-ups, arrests and shootings, Werner became the major Nazi officer responsible for the exactions which took place in Bydgoszcz from September 1939 to spring 1941. People having been in direct contact with him remembered the character as a man driven by an exceptional hatred for everything that was Polish. In addition to Leon Barciszewski and his son, Kampe had been involved in the murder of social activists of Bydgoszcz (Kazimierz Bayer, Jan Góralewski, Tadeusz Janicki), together with Marian Guntzel, the director of municipal gardens, and his wife.

Describing in 1955 the WWII Nazi actions in Bydgoszcz, Julis Hoppenrath, the President of the Gdańsk tax administration, claimed: "the regional party headed by Kampe was particularly active in this field. Polish intelligentsia paid for his activities with their life".

The criminal actions carried out in the area of Bydgoszcz were looked with interest in Gdańsk and Berlin, thanks to regular visits that W. Kampe made to Albert Forster, gauleister of the province and to both Reichsführer-SS Heinrich Himmler and Joseph Goebbels.

==== Demolition of the Old Town in Bydgoszcz ====
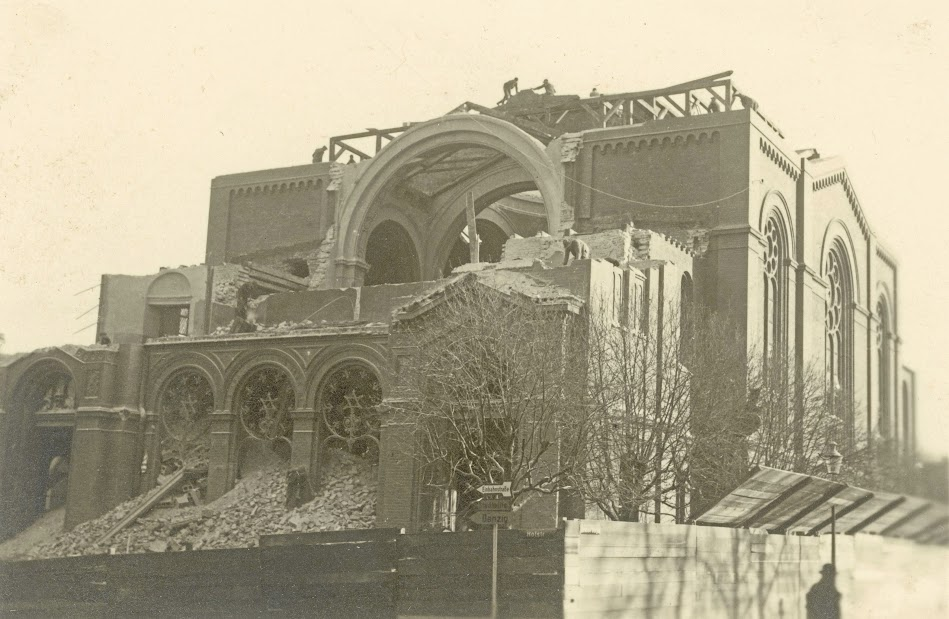
Bydgoszcz synagogue in 1940

The city synagogue, then located at the corner of Wały Jagiellońskie and Jana Kazimierza streets, had been closed after the outbreak of World War II and the entry of the Germans into Bydgoszcz. On 14 September 1939 Werner Kampe announced in Deutsche Rundschau the tender for the demolition of the temple together with other buildings belonging to the Jewish community. The bid was won by Herbert Matthes, owner of a furniture factory on Garbary Street. Despite this result, four days later, Kampe asked Franz Froese, then municipal construction counselor, to organize the dismantlement of the synagogue by professionals as soon as possible. Eventually, the building demolition was completed by December 1939.

Furthermore, on 20 September 1939, Kampe demanded the liquidation of:

- the building of then Polish district office at 7 Słowackiego street;
- the monument to Henryk Sienkiewicz located in today's Jan Kochanowski Park in Bydgoszcz (replica from 1968);
- the monument to the Unknown Insurgent of the Greater Poland uprising in today's Bernardyńska street (rebuilt in 1968 on a design by Stanisław Horno-Popławski and Aleksander Dętkoś).

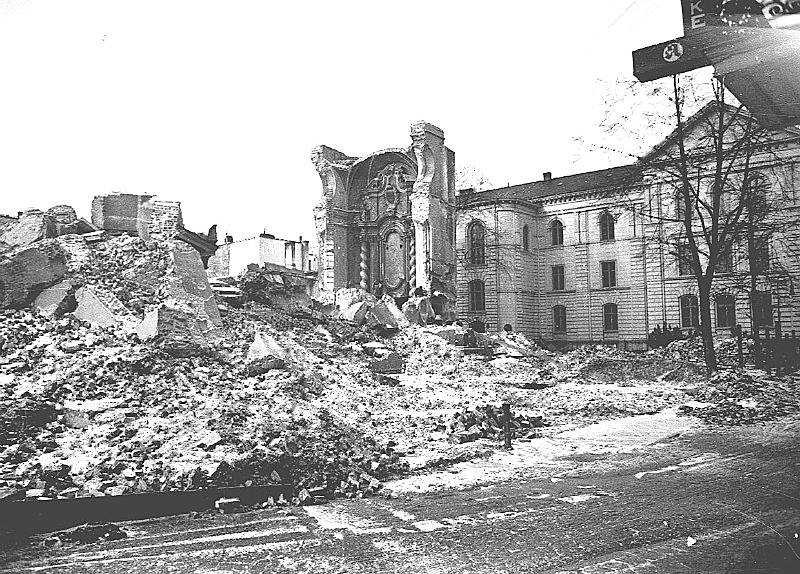
Demolitions on the Old market square, early 1940

Resettling Polish and Jewish inhabitants, Werner ultimately desired to establish a German district in the city center, near the town hall. Nevertheless, this idea was never fully implemented as many dignitaries preferred to keep living in villas, far from the old town. Part of this scheme included an overall reconstruction of the city center, to make it the new German Bromberg (German: Das neue deutsche Bromberg). Hence, in December 1939, he ordered the demolition of the Old Market Square western frontage where was standing the Former Jesuit Church with a view to erect on this spot a new town hall and a large parade square around. The mass was celebrated on the morning of Monday 8 January 1940, and the demolition works started straight away. As testified after the war by Otto von Proeck, then head of the Orpo in Bydgoszcz and opposed to Kampe:

Kampe did not consider me at all. At one of the meetings, Forster put forward a project to demolish the Jesuit church in Bydgoszcz. The idea came from Kampe, who was completely ignorant in the field of art. He was a man without education, by profession a commercial assistant in the confectionery industry.

This project was partially carried out in the first half of 1940: the church, three adjoining tenements on the right and one building on the left (the first seat of the city Museum) were razed down. However, the Nazis could not push further their plans.

In the same move, houses on Mostowa street were torn down, along the Brda river bank in Bydgoszcz.

==== Financial embezzlement ====
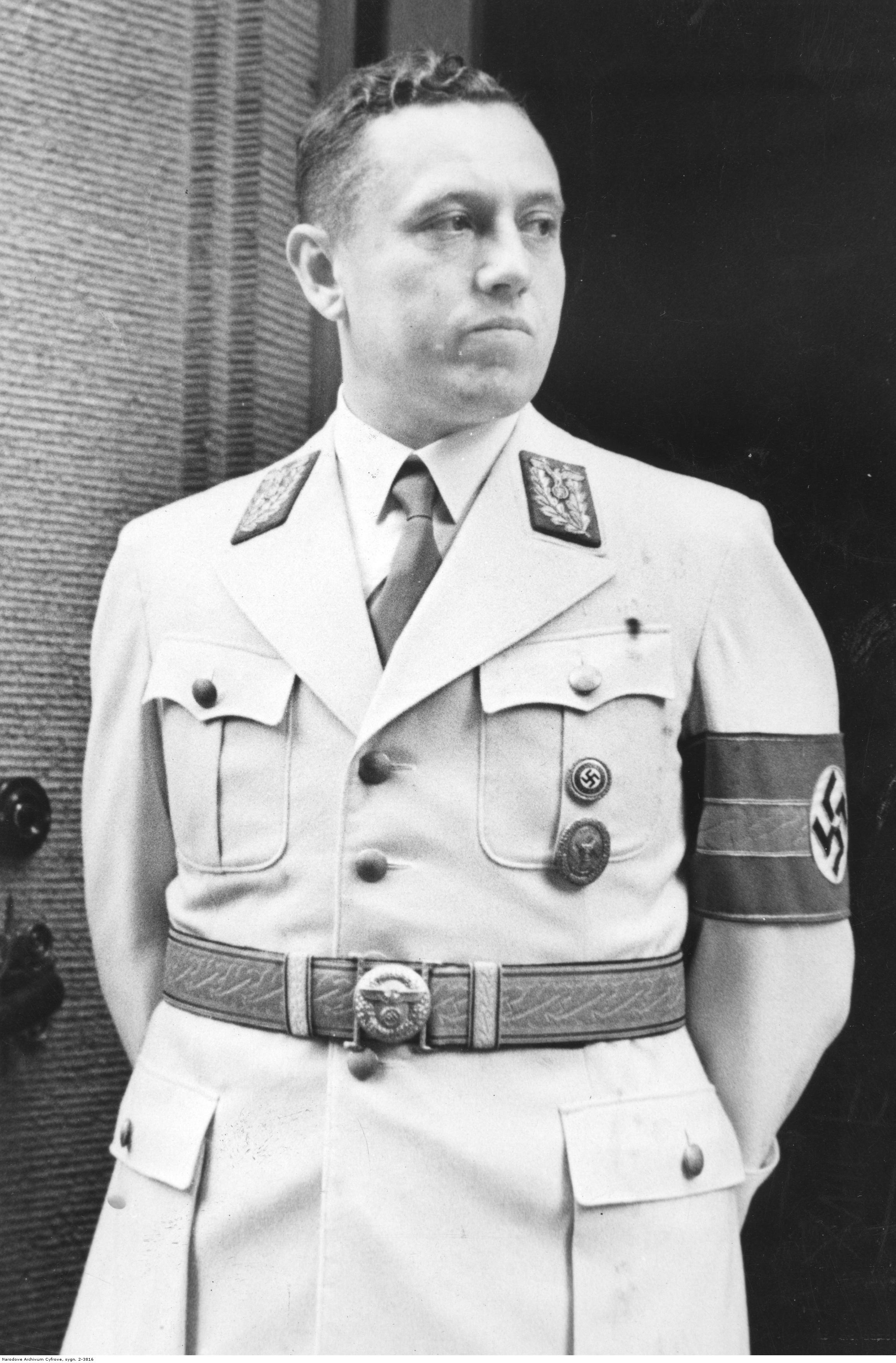
Albert Forster, Kampe's protector

At the beginning of 1940, Werner Kampe was interrogated by the Nazi prosecutor's office in a case of plunder and property appropriation of murdered Poles. The "Compensation Office for Germans" created immediately after his arriving in Bydgoszcz was requisitioning furniture and valuables from apartments of Poles and re-allocating them to Germans. However, the activity was arbitrarily led by Kampe alone and not by the "Central Trustee Office-East" established by the Third Reich authorities, which raised claims by local Germans, followed by denunciations and investigations by the Orpo and the Gestapo.

Several persons from Kampe entourage were arrested, but Kampe himself, under the political protection of Albert Forster, was left alone.

=== Activity from 1941 to 1945 ===
The situation of Kampe in Bydgoszcz was already made difficult by his personal rivalries with local Nazi notables such as Günther Patschowsky (president of the Bydgoszcz Region in 1939–1940), Dr. Kemp (the German prosecutor) or von Proeck (head of the Orpo). The sentences of financial embezzlement pronounced among his network and the suspicions associated with his person were the last straw for him.

On 18 February 1941 Werner was transferred from Bydgoszcz to Gdańsk where Albert Forster appointed him as kreisleiter of the region. After Forster dropped him out, he was later sent to the western front. There, on 29 April 1945, he was captured by the Americans near Wismar on the Baltic coast.

=== Activity after WWII ===
==== Escaping the war crimes investigations ====
Since Kampe's name did not appear on the list of international war criminals issued by the CROWCASS, he was released by the Americans. It is presumed that he settled in Erfurt, in the then Soviet occupation zone of Germany, under an assumed identity.

His name is mentioned in the files of the former "Main Commission for the Investigation of German Crimes in Poland" (Polish: Główna Komisja Badania Zbrodni Niemieckich w Polsce) for Bydgoszcz, as late as August 1946. On 30 November 1946 the city District Court issued a decision accusing Werner Kampe of war crimes. The proceedings sped up in spring 1947, when archives about Kampe's actions were discovered in the City Hall, establishing his role in the mass executions during the first months of the German occupation. On 27 May 1947 the investigating judge in Warsaw wrote to the director of the Main Commission for the Investigation of German Crimes in Poland in order to prosecute Werner Kampe together with Albert Forster, who was to be judged in 1948 by the Supreme National Tribunal (Polish: Najwyższy Trybunał Narodowy).

Following this decision it appeared that the name of Kampe was not on the lists of war criminals wanted by Poland. In addition, the search carried out by the Polish military missions investigating German war crimes in the Western occupation zones did not bring results, since Werner was hidden in the Soviet zone at the time, a move that no one expected.

==== End of life in West Germany ====
In 1954, Werner Kampe made his way to West Germany and settled in Hanover. Living in the city center at 18 Gustaw Adolf, he officially opened afterwards an insurance office under his real name.

During the "Brombergerprozess" in Munich which took place in 1966, the prosecutor charged Kampe with the murder of Bydgoszcz mayor Leon Barciszewski and his son. However, the court did not follow the indictment placed and only summoned him as a witness.

Krzysztof Kąkolewski, a Polish reporter, sought out Kampe in Hanover and asked for an interview. The latter refused; he only advised the journalist as follows:

It is best to forget about the times of war.

Werner Kamiński alias "Werner Adolf Kampe" died in Hanover on 23 May 1974, aged 63.

== See also ==
- List of presidents of Bydgoszcz
- Bloody Sunday (1939)
- Intelligenzaktion Pommern
- Operation Tannenberg
- Valley of Death (Bydgoszcz)
- Walter Ernst

== Bibliography ==
- (in Polish) Bielawski, Wacław (1972). Kupiec z Hanoweru. Kalendarz Bydgoski. Bydgoszcz: Towarzystwo Miłośników Miasta Bydgoszczy. pp. 97–101.
- (in Polish) Błażejewski, Krzysztof (2009). Zapomniał o wojnie. Kalendarz Bydgoski. Bydgoszcz: Towarzystwo Miłośników Miasta Bydgoszczy.
- (in Polish) Biskup, Marian (2004). Historia Bydgoszczy. Tom II. Część druga 1939-1945. Bydgoszcz: Bydgoskie Towarzystwo Naukowe. pp. 99–110. ISBN 8392145402.
- (in Polish) Jastrzębska-Puzowska Iwona, Wysocka Agnieszka (2007). Usuwanie śladów, zacieranie tradycji. Architektura i urbanistyka Bydgoszczy w czasie II wojny światowej i w pierwszych latach powojennych. Materiały do Dziejów Kultury i Sztuki Bydgoszczy i Regionu. zeszyt 12. Bydgoszcz: Pracownia Dokumentacji i Popularyzacji Zabytków Wojewódzkiego Ośrodka Kultury w Bydgoszczy. pp. 57–70.
- (in Polish) Jaszowski Tadeusz, Kuta Tadeusz (1967). Werner Kampe – amator zbrodni. Okręgowa Komisja Badania Zbrodni Hitlerowskich. Bydgoszcz: Zarząd Okręgu Związku Bojowników o Wolność i Demokrację.
- (in Polish) Schenk, Dieter (2002). Albert Forster. Gdański namiestnik Hitlera. Gdańsk: Wydawnictwo Oskar. ISBN 8386181834.
