= Valley of Death (Bydgoszcz) =

Mass murder of Polish civilians, 1939

- Part of Intelligenzaktion Pommern
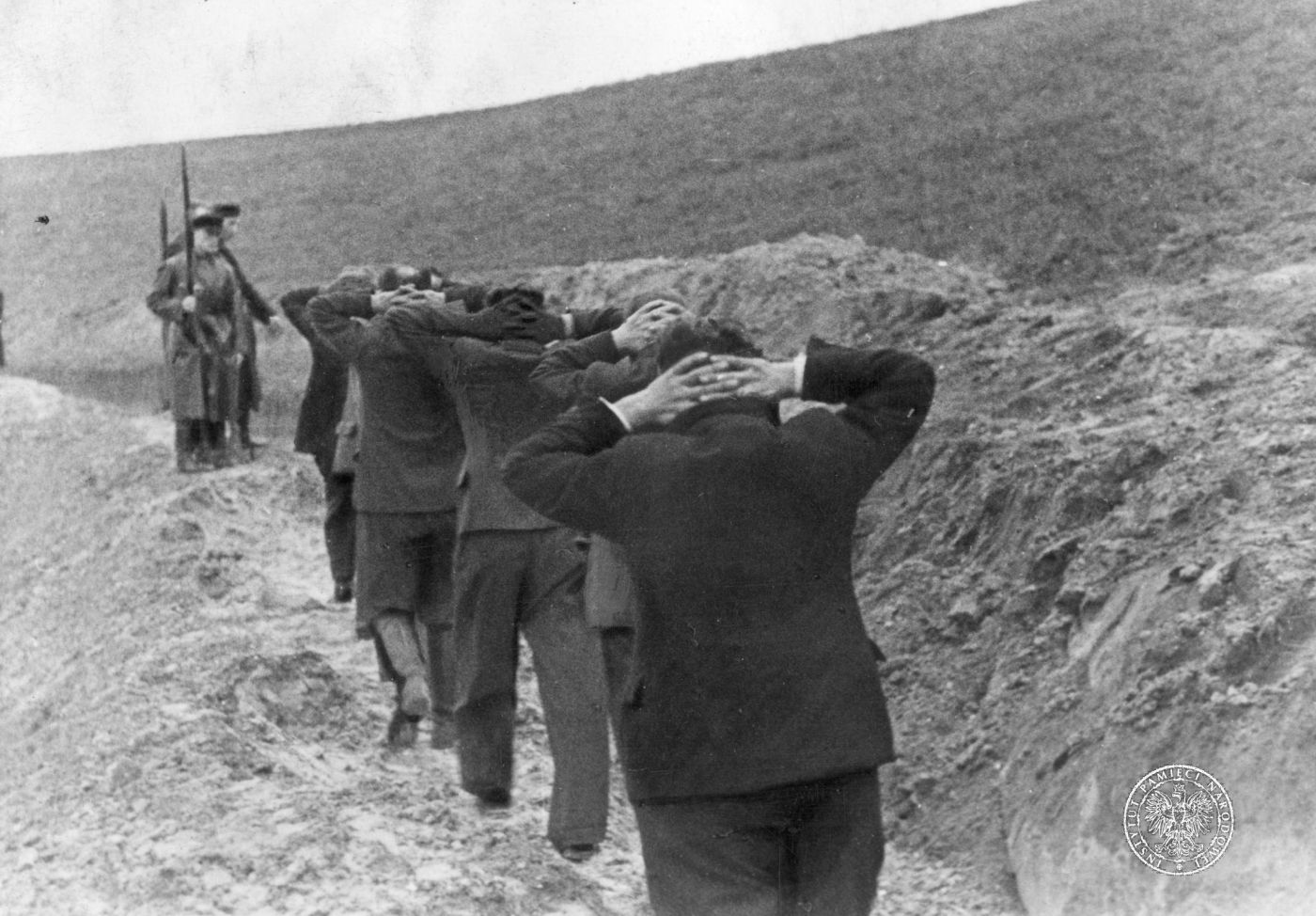
- Polish teachers from Bydgoszcz led by members of the Volksdeutscher Selbstschutz to their execution site

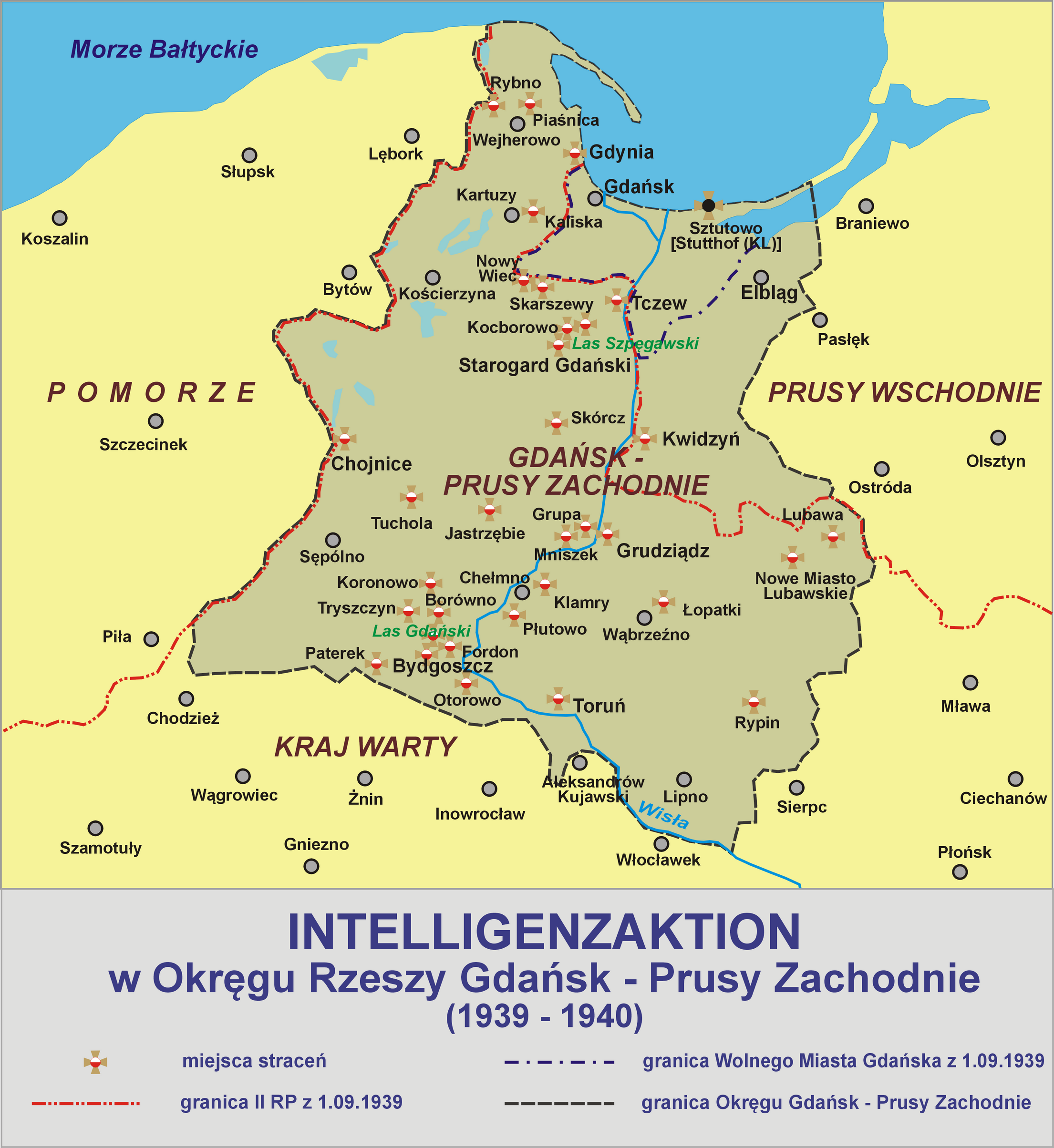
- Location: 53°9′23″N 18°8′5″E; German occupied Poland
- Date: October and November 1939
- Target: Polish intelligentsia
- Victim: 1,200 – 1,400
- Perpetrators: Gestapo, Volksdeutscher Selbstschutz
- Motive: Anti-Polish sentiment, antisemitism

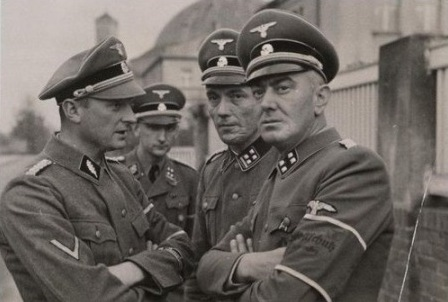
Commanders of the new Selbstschutz battalions of German executioners in Bydgoszcz. From the left: SS-Standartenführer Ludolf Jakob von Alvensleben, chief of the Selbstschutz inspectorate in Płutowo. SS-Obersturmbannführer Erich Spaarmann, chief of the Selbstschutz inspectorate in Bydgoszcz (till November 1939). SS-Obersturmbannführer Hans Kölzow, chief of the Selbstschutz inspectorate in Inowrocław. SS-Sturmbannführer Christian Schnug, chief of the Selbstschutz inspectorate in Bydgoszcz as of December 1939.

Valley of Death (Polish: Dolina Śmierci) in Fordon, Bydgoszcz, northern Poland, is a site of Nazi German mass murder committed at the beginning of World War II and a mass grave of 1,200–1,400 Poles and Jews murdered in October and November 1939 by the local German Selbstschutz and the Gestapo. The murders were a part of Intelligenzaktion in Pomerania, a Nazi action aimed at the elimination of the Polish intelligentsia in Reichsgau Danzig-West Prussia, which included the former Pomeranian Voivodeship ("Polish Corridor"). It was part of a larger genocidal action that took place in all German occupied Poland, code-named Operation Tannenberg.

== History ==
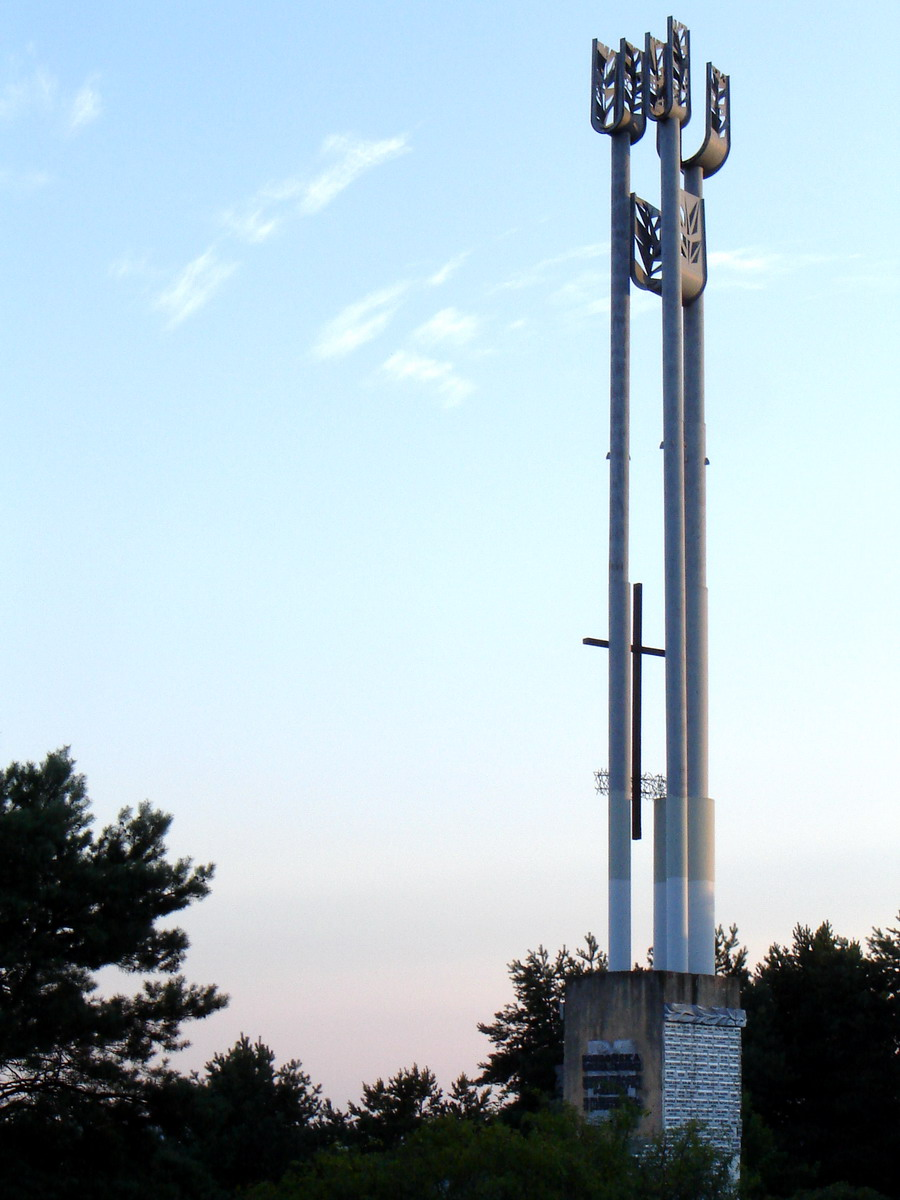
Memorial to the murdered at the Valley of Death

Victims, mainly Polish intelligentsia: teachers, priests, office workers, were listed on so called Sonderfahndungsbuch Polen (a list of people destined to be executed, made by Third Reich officials before World War II) and another list made by Gestapo during the war.

The perpetrators were mainly from the new Selbstschutz battalions called the Volksdeutscher Selbstschutz, a paramilitary formation of civilian shooters composed of men from the German minority of pre-war Poland, as well as the Einsatzkommando 16 of SS Einsatzgruppen under command of SS-Sturmbannführer Rudolf Tröger. Between September 1939 and April 1940 Selbstschutz - together with other Nazi-German formations - murdered tens of thousands of Poles in Pomerania.

Established investigations point to Ludolf von Alvensleben and Jakub Löllgen, as the main organizers of the mass murder. Other Germans involved in the crime were: Sturmbannführers Erich Spaarmann, Meier, Schnugg, SS-Sturmbannführer dr Rudolf Tröger, SS man Baks, and a number of Volksdeutsche including Wilhelm Neumann, Herbert Beitsch, Otto Erlichmann (Nazi mayor of Fordon), and Walter Gassmann.

Other Nazi German mass murder sites in Bydgoszcz area are the villages of Tryszczyn and Borówno.

== See also ==
Media related to Valley of Death at Wikimedia Commons
Media related to Bydgoszcz during World War II at Wikimedia Commons

- Anti-Polonism
- Babi Yar (ravine and massacre site in Ukraine)
- Nazi German mass murders in Kuyavian-Pomeranian Voivodeship (1939-1945)
- List of Polish Martyrdom sites

== Notes and references ==
- History of Fordon 1939-1945 (in Polish)
- Extermination of Polish intelligentsia on Pomerania (in Polish)
- Valley of Death - pictures and short description (in Polish)

== Bibliography ==
- Jochen Böhler, Klaus-Michael Mallmann, Jürgen Matthäus: Einsatzgruppen in Polen. Warszawa: Bellona, 2009. ISBN 978-83-11-11588-0
- Jochen Böhler; Klaus-Michael Mallmann; Jürgen Matthäus (2009), Zbrodnie Wehrmachtu w Polsce. Wrzesień 1939 (PDF) (in Polish), translated by Patrycja Pieńkowska-Wiederkehr, Wydawnictwo Znak, pp. 44–45, ISBN 9788324012251, archived from the original (PDF file, direct download 432 KB) on 13 October 2013, "from German: Auftakt zum Vernichtungskrieg: Die Wehrmacht in Polen 1939, ISBN 3596163072."
