= Tryszczyn =

- Village
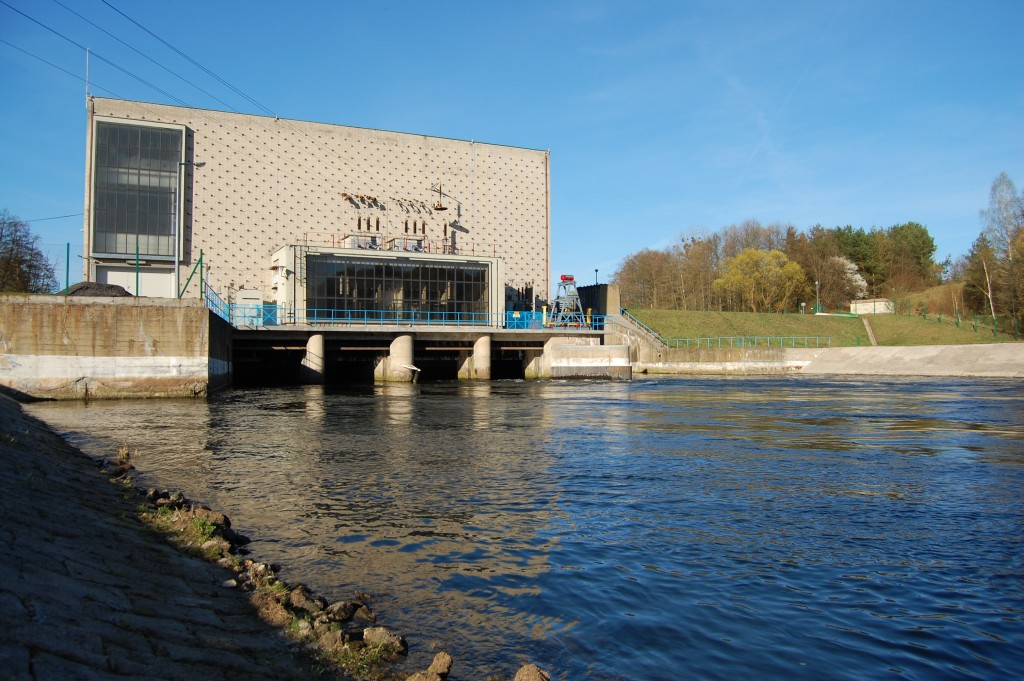
- Hydroelectric power plant in Tryszczyn

- Location within Poland
- Coordinates: 53°14′N 17°55′E
- Country: Poland
- Voivodeship: Kuyavian-Pomeranian
- County: Bydgoszcz
- Gmina: Koronowo
- Time zone: UTC+1 (CET)
  - Summer (DST): UTC+2 (CEST)
- Vehicle registration: CBY
- Primary airport: Bydgoszcz Ignacy Jan Paderewski Airport

Tryszczyn [ˈtrɨʂt͡ʂɨn] is a village in the administrative district of Gmina Koronowo, within Bydgoszcz County, Kuyavian-Pomeranian Voivodeship, in north-central Poland. It is located in the historic region of Kuyavia.

== History ==
During the German occupation (World War II), in 1939, Tryszczyn was the site of large massacres of Poles from Bydgoszcz carried out by the Germans as part of the Intelligenzaktion. Among the victims were teachers, activists, priests, old people, and even boy and girl scouts, gymnasium students, and children as young as 12.
