= First National Bank Building =

First National Bank Building, or variants thereof, may refer to:

== Japan ==
- First National Bank Building (Tokyo)

== United States ==
Alphabetical by state, then city

- First National Bank Building (Andalusia, Alabama), listed on the National Register of Historic Places (NRHP)
- First National Bank Building (Monette, Arkansas), NRHP-listed
- First National Bank Building (Hollywood, California), NRHP-listed
- First National Bank of Long Beach (Long Beach, California), NRHP-listed
- First National Bank Center (San Diego, California)
- First National Bank Building (San Diego), part of the Gaslamp Quarter Historic District
- First National Bank Building (Craig, Colorado), NRHP-listed
- First National Bank Building (Denver, Colorado)
- First National Bank Building (Steamboat Springs, Colorado), NRHP-listed
- First National Bank Building (Wellington, Colorado), listed on the NRHP in Colorado
- First National Bank Building (Hartford, Connecticut)
- First National Bank Building (Pensacola, Florida)
- First National Bank Building (Sebring, Florida)
- First National Bank Building (Atlanta, Georgia), now State of Georgia Building
- First National Bank Building (Danville, Illinois), NRHP-listed
- First National Bank Building (Terre Haute, Indiana), NRHP-listed
- First National Bank Building (Davenport, Iowa), NRHP-listed
- First National Bank Building (Fort Dodge, Iowa), NRHP-listed
- First National Bank (Mount Pleasant, Iowa), NRHP-listed
- First National Bank (Ottumwa, Iowa), NRHP-listed
- First National Bank Building (Highland, Kansas), NRHP-listed
- First National Bank Building (Smith Center, Kansas), NRHP-listed
- First National Bank Building (Paintsville, Kentucky), NRHP-listed
- First National Bank Building (Boston, Massachusetts)
- First National Bank Building (Alpha, Michigan), NRHP-listed
- First National Bank Building (Ann Arbor, Michigan), NRHP-listed
- First National Bank building (Menominee, Michigan), downtown Menominee, Michigan
- First National Bank Building (Dawson, Minnesota), now Dawson Bank Museum
- First National Bank (St. Cloud, Minnesota), NRHP-listed
- First National Bank Building (Saint Paul, Minnesota)
- First National Bank Building (Bolivar, Missouri), listed on the NRHP in Polk County, Missouri
- First National Bank Building (Lincoln, Nebraska)
- First National Bank Building (Omaha, Nebraska), NRHP-listed
- First National Bank Building (Albuquerque, New Mexico), NRHP-listed
- First National Bank Building (Charlotte, North Carolina) or 112 Tryon Plaza
- First National Bank Building (Creedmoor, North Carolina)
- First National Bank Building (Gastonia, North Carolina)
- First National Bank Building (Cincinnati, Ohio), now Fourth & Walnut Center, listed on the NRHP in Ohio
- First National Bank Building (Elyria, Ohio), listed on the NRHP in Ohio
- First National Bank and Trust Building (Lima, Ohio), NRHP-listed
- First National Bank Building (Massillon, Ohio), listed on the NRHP in Ohio
- First National Bank Building (Youngstown, Ohio), listed on the NRHP in Ohio
- First National Bank Building (Stratford, Oklahoma)
- First National Bank Building (Tulsa, Oklahoma)
- First National Bank Building (Portland, Oregon), NRHP-listed
- First National Bank Tower (Portland, Oregon), now Wells Fargo Center (Portland, Oregon)
- First National Bank Building, now Capitol Center, Salem, Oregon
- First National Bank Building (Pittsburgh)
- First National Bank Building (Custer, South Dakota), listed on the NRHP in South Dakota
- First National Bank Building of Vermillion (Vermillion, South Dakota), listed on the NRHP in South Dakota
- First National Bank Building (Webster, South Dakota), listed on the NRHP in South Dakota
- First National Bank Building (Beaumont, Texas)
- First National Bank Building (Fort Worth, Texas)
- First National Bank Building (Jayton, Texas)
- First National Bank Building (Meridian, Texas), listed on the NRHP in Texas
- First National Bank Building (Stephenville, Texas), listed on the NRHP in Texas
- First National Bank Building (Sweetwater, Texas), listed on the NRHP in Texas
- First National Bank Building (Terrell, Texas), listed on the NRHP in Texas
- First National Bank Building (Richmond, Virginia)
- First National Bank (Rhinelander, Wisconsin), NRHP-listed
- First National Bank Building (Rock Springs, Wyoming), NRHP-listed

== See also ==
- First National Bank (disambiguation)
