= First Bank =

First Bank is the name used by various financial institutions worldwide. The term, either as whole or as part of a combination of names, may refer to:

== International ==
- First Bank of Nigeria, a Nigerian bank with branches in Ghana, South Africa, Guinea, Gambia, Sierra Leone, DRC, UAE, United States, UK, France, China, etc.
- First National Bank (disambiguation), a name used by various banks worldwide
- First Interstate Bank (disambiguation), a name used by various banks worldwide
- First Commercial Bank (disambiguation), used by a bank in Taipei, Taiwan, as well as several in the United States

== Africa ==
- First Bank of Nigeria, with branches across Nigeria
- Afriland First Bank, in Cameroon, Equatorial Guinea, Congo (Brazzaville) and Sao Tome e Principe

== Asia ==
- First Gulf Bank, in Abu Dhabi, United Arab Emirates
- First Microfinance Bank, in Karachi, Sindh, Pakistan
- First Microfinance Bank, in Dushanbe, Tajikistan
- First Women Bank Limited, in Karachi, Sindh, Pakistan
- First Pacific Bank, a former bank based in Hong Kong

== Europe ==
- First Bank, part of the J.C. Flowers & Co. Group, in Romania
- First Trust Bank, part of the AIB Group, in Belfast, Northern Ireland

== United States ==
- FirstBank Holding Co, also known as 1stBank, a privately held bank based in Lakewood, Colorado with locations in Colorado, California, and Arizona
- First American National Bank, a defunct bank now part of Amsouth Bancorporation
- First Bancorp, a financial holding company in Southern Pines, North Carolina
- First BanCorp, more commonly known as FirstBank, a financial holding company in Puerto Rico
- First Bank & Trust, headquartered in Evanston, Illinois and serving the Chicago area
- First Bank System, a Minneapolis, Minnesota-based regional bank holding company that had used the trade name First Bank before the holding company was renamed U.S. Bancorp in 1997
- First International Bank, in Watford City, North Dakota
- First Midwest Bank, in Joliet, Illinois
- Seafirst Bank, acquired by Bank of America, known in the early 1970s as Firstbank
- Security First Network Bank, claimed to be the first pure internet bank, in Atlanta, Georgia

== Caribbean ==
- FirstCaribbean International Bank, in Barbados
- FirstBank (Puerto Rico), in Puerto Rico, formerly First Federal

== Similarly Named ==
- FirstBank Building, part of the Palmer Center complex, is a class A high-rise office building in Colorado Springs, Colorado. The building was known as the Holly Sugar Building
- First American Bank (disambiguation)
- First Commonwealth Bank, a financial services company based in Indiana, Pennsylvania, primarily serving the Western and the Central Pennsylvania regions
- First Federal Bank (disambiguation)
- First Pennsylvania Bank, a bank based in Philadelphia, Pennsylvania. Founded in 1782, it was for decades the oldest bank in the United States until it was acquired by CoreStates Financial Corporation in 1989
- First Security Bank, a privately held company based in Searcy, Arkansas
- First State Bank (disambiguation)
- First Westroads Bank, a locally owned community bank in Omaha, Nebraska, USA, with two branches

== Other uses ==
- First Bank F.C., a Nigerian association football club run by First Bank of Nigeria
