= Welch House =

Welch House may refer to:

in the United Kingdom

- Welch House, Church Road, Onchan, Isle of Man, one of Isle of Man's Registered Buildings

in the United States

- Welch-Averiett House, Sylacauga, Alabama, listed on the National Register of Historic Places (NRHP)
- William Welch House, Canehill, Arkansas, NRHP-listed
- Welch Pottery Works, Tulip, Arkansas, NRHP-listed
- Welch-Hurst, Saratoga, California, NRHP-listed
- David Welch House, Milton, Connecticut, NRHP-listed
- Welch Training School, New Haven, Connecticut, NRHP-listed
- Edward Welch House, Boise, Idaho, NRHP-listed
- Welch Apartments, Muscatine, Iowa, NRHP-listed
- Andrew Welch Homestead, Parsonsfield, Maine, NRHP-listed
- Jenkins H. Welch House, Hazelhurst, Mississippi, NRHP-listed
- William H. Welch House, Baltimore, Maryland, NRHP-listed
- Welch Factory Building No. 1, Westfield, New York, NRHP-listed
- Shook-Welch-Smathers House, Clyde, North Carolina, NRHP-listed
- Welch-Nicholson House and Mill Site, Houstonville, North Carolina, NRHP-listed
- J.C. Welch House, Muskogee, Oklahoma, NRHP-listed
- Mathias Welch House, Central Point, Oregon, NRHP-listed
- L.J. Welch House, Mitchell, South Dakota, NRHP-listed
- Laura M Welch House, Sioux Falls, South Dakota, NRHP-listed
- Baird-Welch House, Cornersville, Tennessee, NRHP-listed
- Welch-Sherman House, Park City, Utah, NRHP-listed
- C.A. Welch House, Waukesha, Wisconsin, NRHP-listed

== See also ==
- Willard Memorial Chapel-Welch Memorial Hall, Auburn, New York, NRHP-listed
- Welch Commercial Historic District, Welch, West Virginia, NRHP-listed
