= First National Bank =

First National Bank may refer to:

== Worldwide ==
=== Lebanon ===
- First National Bank (Lebanon)

=== Namibia ===
- First National Bank (Namibia)

=== Japan ===
- Dai-Ichi Bank, formerly First National Bank (第一国立銀行, Dai'ichi Kokuritsu Ginkō)

=== South Africa ===
- First National Bank (South Africa)

== United States ==
=== Banking institutions (existing) ===
- First National Bank of Florida
- First National Bank of Layton, Utah
- First National Bank of Omaha, Nebraska
- FNB Corporation of Pittsburgh, Pennsylvania

=== Banking institutions (former) ===
- First National Bank of Arizona, became part of First Interstate Bancorp
- First National Bank of Boston, acquired by Fleet Bank and merged into Bank of America
- First National Bank of New York, now part of Citibank
- First National Bank of Oregon, became part of First Interstate Bancorp
- First National Bank of San Francisco, merged with Crocker National Bank
- First National Bank, Hoboken, New Jersey
- First Bank of the United States, first private central bank of the United States
- First Chicago Bank, formerly First National Bank of Chicago, Illinois
- First Financial Bank, formerly First National Bank of Terre Haute, Indiana
- First Maryland Bancorp, now part of M&T Bank
- First National Bank (Bolivar, Missouri)
- First National Bank (Brooksville, Florida)
- First National Bank (Clinton, Iowa)
- First National Bank (Iowa Falls, Iowa)
- First National Bank (Mount Pleasant, Iowa)
- First National Bank (New Cumberland, West Virginia)
- First National Bank (Philadelphia), Philadelphia, Pennsylvania
- First National Bank of Brooklyn, acquired by Bank of the Manhattan Company and merged into JPMorgan Chase
- First National Bank of Charleroi, Charleroi, Pennsylvania
- First National Bank of Charlotte, Charlotte, North Carolina
- First National Bank of Davenport, Iowa
- First National Bank of Dubuque, merged into US Bancorp
- First National Bank of Long Beach
- First National Bank of Mason City, Mason City, Iowa
- First National Bank of Minneapolis and First National Bank of Saint Paul, Minnesota, now part of US Bank
- First National Bank of Whitestone, acquired by Bank of the Manhattan Company and merged into JPMorgan Chase
- PNC Financial Services, formerly First National Bank of Pittsburgh, Pennsylvania
- Regions Bank, formerly First National Bank of Little Rock, Arkansas
- Seafirst Bank or Seattle-First National Bank; acquired by Bank of America
- Security Pacific Bank, formerly Security-First National Bank of Los Angeles, California
- Southeast Banking Corporation, formerly First National Bank of Miami, Florida
- Wachovia Bank of Georgia, formerly First National Bank of Atlanta, Georgia

== See also ==
- First National Bank Building (disambiguation)
- First Bank (disambiguation)
- First National Bank of Boston v. Bellotti
