= First Commercial Bank =

First Commercial Bank may refer to:

- First Commercial Bank (Chicago), a subsidiary of Metropolitan Bank Group headquartered in Chicago
- First Commercial Bank (Birmingham), a subsidiary of Synovus headquartered in Birmingham, Alabama
- First Commercial Bank (Odell, Nebraska), a National Register of Historic Places listing in Gage County, Nebraska
- First Commercial Bank, a bank in Taiwan
- First Commercial Bank of Florida, Orlando, Florida, U.S., a failed bank in the United States
- First Commercial Bank, Bloomington, Minnesota, U.S., with Stu Voigt as chairman of the board
- First Commercial Bank, New York, New York, U.S., a tenant in Two World Trade Center

== See also ==
- First Bank (disambiguation)
