= First National =

First National may refer to:

- First National Financial Corporation, a Canadian company
- First National Pictures, an early Hollywood films studio, later absorbed by Warner Bros
- First National (TV series), a 1994–2001 Canadian television newscast

== See also ==
- First National Bank (disambiguation)
