= Frank and Nelle Cochrane Woods House =

- U.S. National Register of Historic Places
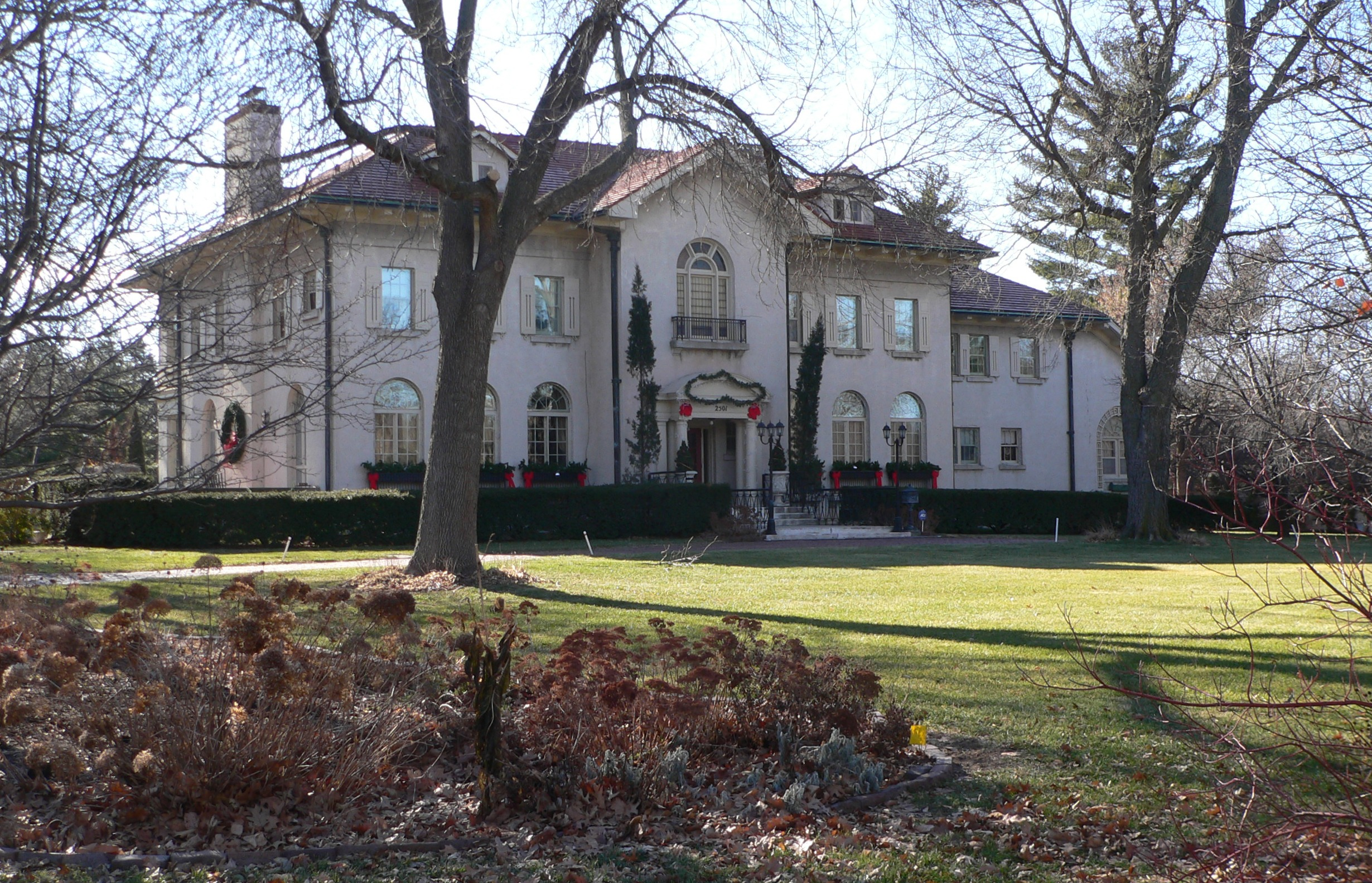
- The house in 2012

- Location within Nebraska Location within the United States
- Location: 2501 Sheridan Blvd., Lincoln, Nebraska
- Coordinates: 40°47′13″N 96°40′54″W
- Area: 3 acres (1.2 ha)
- Built: 1916
- Architect: Paul V. Hyland
- Architectural style: Renaissance Revival
- NRHP reference No.: 95000793
- Added to NRHP: June 30, 1995

The Frank and Nelle Cochrane Woods House is a historic house in Lincoln, Nebraska. It was built in 1916 for Frank Woods, the founder and President of the Lincoln Telephone and Telegraph Company, and his wife, née Nelle Cochrane. It was designed in the Renaissance Revival style by architect Paul V. Hyland, with a "hip roof with red clay tiles, symmetrical elevations, smooth and plain stucco wall surfaces, columns, and many arched openings.". It has been listed on the National Register of Historic Places since June 30, 1995.
