= Downtown Commercial Historic District (Muscatine, Iowa) =

Historic district in Iowa, United States

- U.S. National Register of Historic Places
- U.S. Historic district
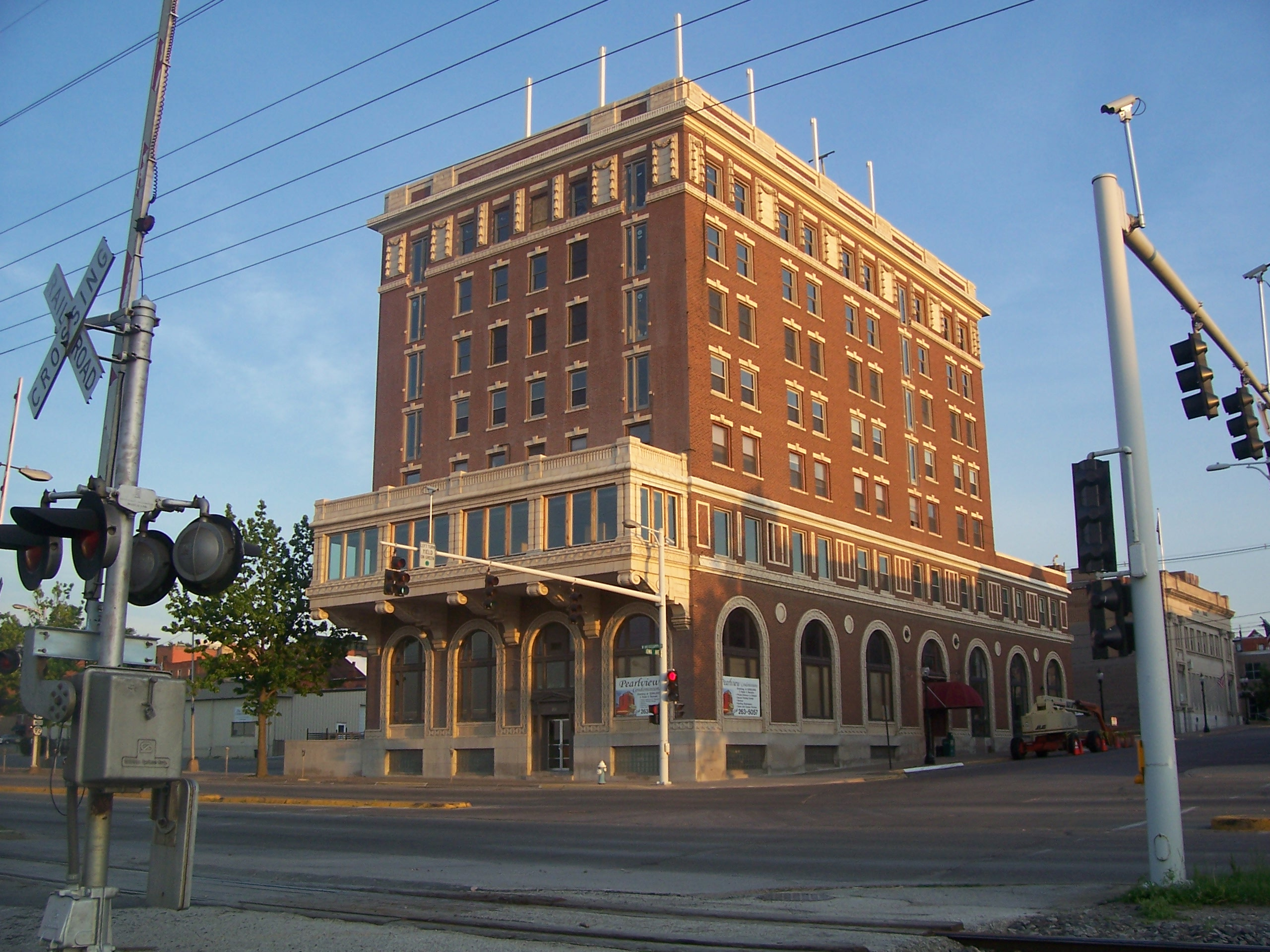
- Hotel Muscatine

- Location within Iowa Location within the United States
- Location: Roughly nine blocks centered on 2nd St. bet. Pine and Mulberry, Muscatine, Iowa
- Coordinates: 41°25′24″N 91°2′44″W
- Area: 25 acres (10 ha)
- Architect: Paul V. Hyland, Joseph E. Mills, others
- Architectural style: Italianate, Queen Anne, other
- MPS: Historical and Architectural Resources of Muscatine. Iowa MPS
- NRHP reference No.: 06000423
- Added to NRHP: May 24, 2006

The Downtown Commercial Historic District in Muscatine, Iowa is a historic district that was listed on the National Register of Historic Places in 2006. At that time, it included 93 contributing buildings, one other contributing object, and 18 non-contributing buildings. The city of Muscatine was established as Bloomington in 1836. The original town was built on land that is generally flat along the Mississippi River. Residential areas were located on the surrounding hills. Commercial and industrial interests developed on the flatter land near the river. Muscatine's commercial and industrial center had developed in a 12-block area along Front Street, now Mississippi Drive, and 2nd Street between Pine Street and Mulberry Street by 1874. This area, represented by the Downtown Commercial Historic District, is the city's original commercial area. Within its boundaries is a large number of 19th-century commercial buildings, many of which were modified in the first half of the 20th century.

== Contributing properties ==
Contributing buildings include:

- Trinity Episcopal Church (already individually listed on the National Register),
- Welch Apartments (already individually listed on the National Register),
- The Hotel Muscatine (1914–15), 101 W. Mississippi Drive, an expensive-in-its-time building, funded in part by a large number of citizens who bought its common stock. It is a seven-story building designed by architect Paul V. Hyland which was the tallest in Muscatine until the 1970s.
- The Laurel Building (1916–17), 101 E. 2nd Street, a six-story combination department store and office building, also designed by Paul V. Hyland, which was for a long time the "other" tall building in downtown Muscatine.

Laurel Building

- Muscatine City Hall (1914), a building for city offices designed by Detroit architect Joseph E. Mills, who had previously designed the district-adjacent Muscatine County Courthouse (1909) and Muscatine County Jail (1909).
- Masonic Temple (1920–21), 317 E. 3rd Street, claimed to be the first Masonic lodge building in Iowa, which also served non-Masonic organizations. The three-story brick building plus furnishings cost more than $104,000.
- First Baptist Church (1923), 224 E. 3rd Street, adjacent to the 1914 City Hall, built in style and material similar to the Masonic Temple.
