= Trinity Episcopal Church (Muscatine, Iowa) =

- U.S. National Register of Historic Places
- U.S. Historic district – Contributing property
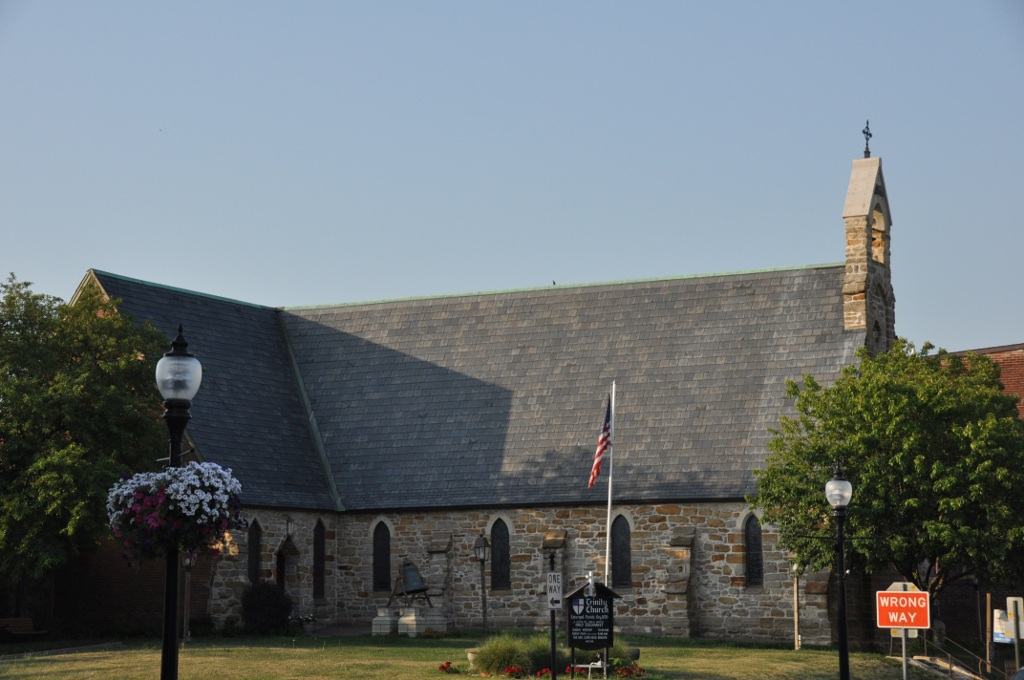

- Location within Iowa Location within the United States
- Location: 411 E. 2nd St. Muscatine, Iowa
- Coordinates: 41°25′24.6″N 91°02′32.7″W
- Area: less than one acre
- Built: 1851-1854
- Architect: Frank Will
- Architectural style: Gothic Revival
- Part of: Downtown Commercial Historic District (ID06000423)
- NRHP reference No.: 74000803
- Added to NRHP: October 29, 1974

Trinity Episcopal Church is a parish church in the Diocese of Iowa. The church is located in Muscatine, Iowa, United States. It was individually listed on the National Register of Historic Places in 1974. In 2006 it was included as a contributing property in the Downtown Commercial Historic District.

In 2024, the church reported 104 members. No membership statistics were reported in 2024 national parochial reports. Plate and pledge financial support reported by the church in 2024 was $36,514. Average Sunday Attendance (ASA) reported in 2024 was 36 persons.

== History ==
=== Development of the Episcopal Church in Muscatine ===
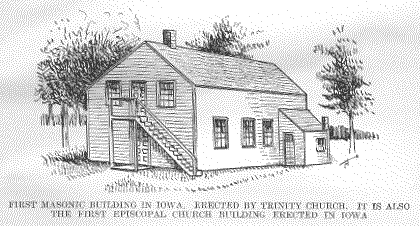
The original Trinity Church in Muscatine.

The Episcopal Church in Muscatine can trace its roots to the arrival of Matthew Matthews, his son Dorrance, and his brothers Hiram and Joseph, and their families in 1839 when the town was named Bloomington. They were visited by the Rt. Rev. Jackson Kemper, Missionary Bishop of the Northwest, the same year and the congregation was organized. It is the first Episcopal parish organized in Iowa. The next year when Bishop Kemper visited he reports the church had seven communicants and timber for the construction of a church building. The bishop contributed $100 towards its construction.

The church was a frame building that measured 50 by 22 feet (15.2 by 6.7 m), and was one and three-fourths stories high. It had eight windows, fifteen lights, and a small vestry room. When Trinity was not using the building the Presbyterian Congregation held services in the building. A bell was mounted on the vestry room and it was utilized by both congregations. The Freemasons completed a second story on the building and occupied that part of the building. Bishop Kemper was opposed to the Masons presence in the building and refused to consecrate the church. This was the first church of any denomination built in Muscatine County, and the first Episcopal Church in Iowa.

The church had no rector initially and was visited by the Rev. Zachariah Goldsmith from Trinity Church in Davenport. On June 28, 1842, the church was reorganized at a meeting with fourteen people present. The Rev. Samuel Sherwell, a deacon from New York, was placed in charge of the church on May 12, 1843.

=== Present church ===
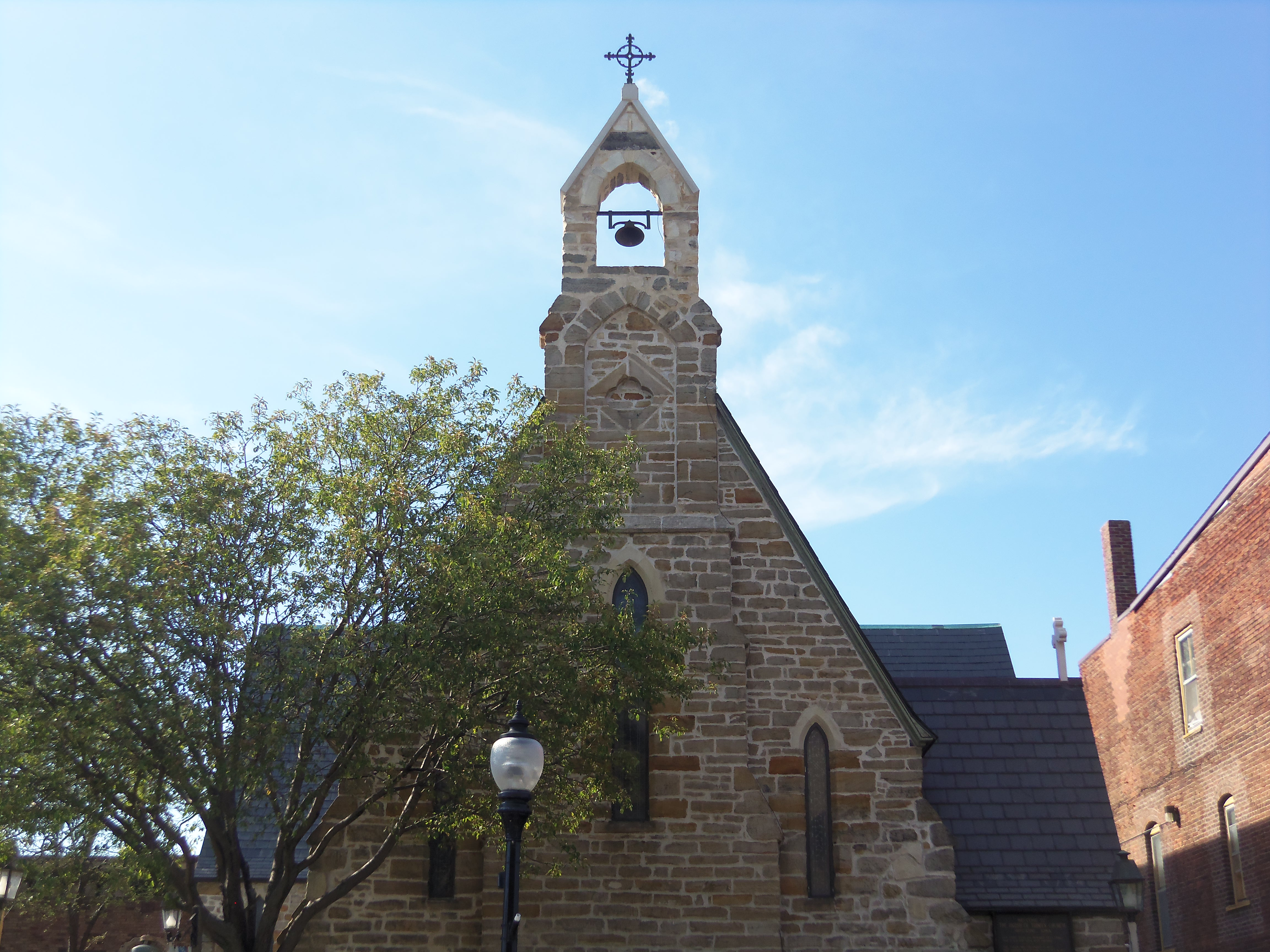
Façade

The Rev. John B. Calhoun, who came to Trinity in 1850, asked parishioners to subscribe towards a new church building. In the spring of 1851, sixteen members subscribed $1,250. He was sent east to collect more subscriptions and he collected a further $1,298.50 from one hundred and sixty-eight people. Frank Will, an architect from New York City, was chosen to design the new church. The new church was built on the same lot as the old church. The basement and foundations were built in the fall of 1851 and the cornerstone was laid on November 11. Construction on the church took three years. It is built of sandstone in the Gothic Revival style.

Bishop Kemper came to Muscatine to consecrate the new church on May 25, 1854. He was assisted by the Rev. John Ufford. The building was enlarged in 1855, and it was given its cruciform plan at that time. A bell was placed in the bell-cote in 1856. The present interior oak furnishings, including an altar, pulpit, lectern, choir stalls, and pews, were installed in 1887 when the Reverend E.C. Paget was the rector. The stained glass windows in the transepts were added at the same time. The Ascension window at the end of the nave was installed in 1896.

=== Diocese of Iowa ===
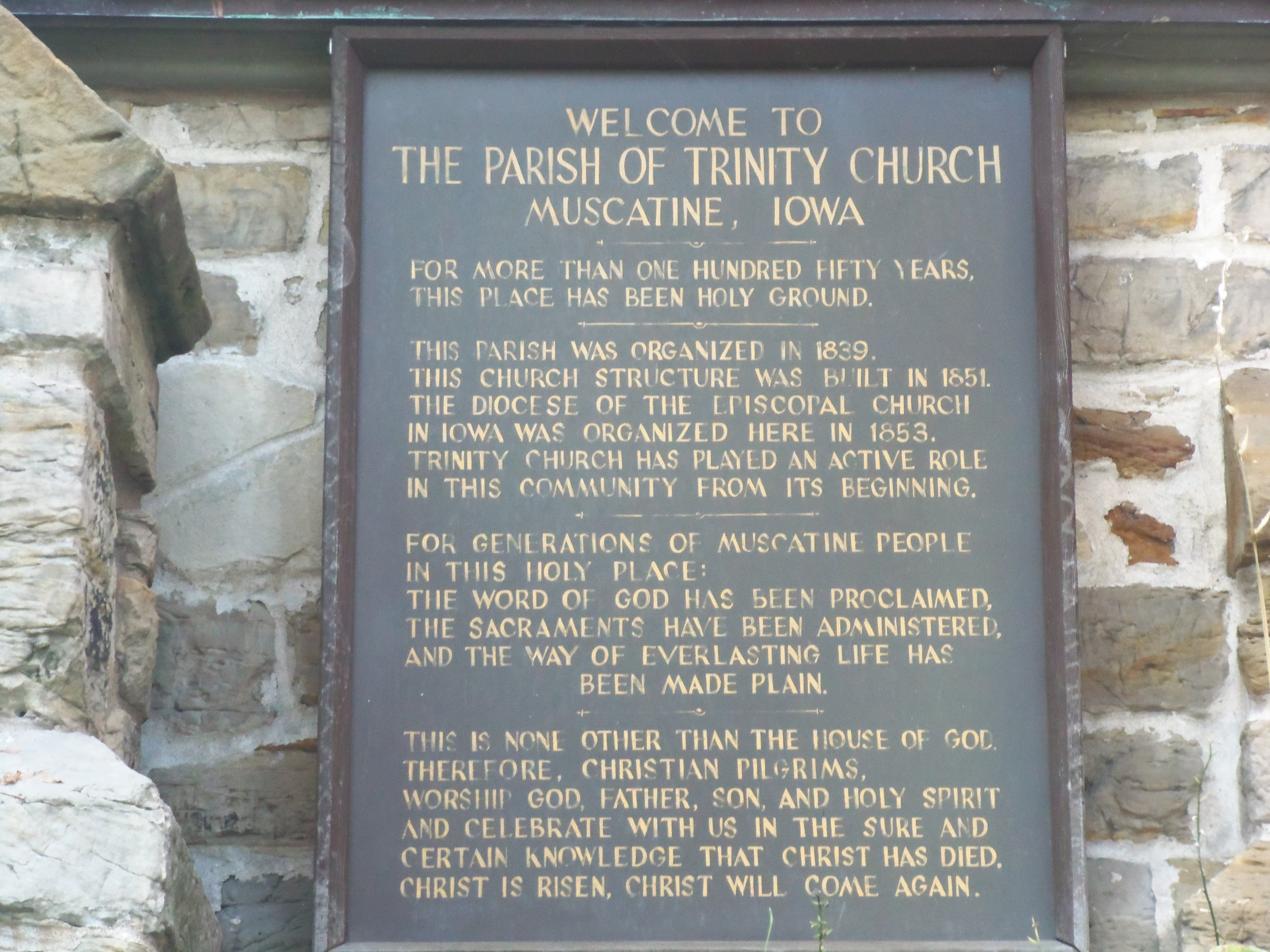
Plaque on the church

The Diocese of Iowa was organized by Bishop Kemper in 1853. He invited the clergy and representatives of the various congregations of the state to a meeting at Trinity Church in Muscatine on August 17. In the absence of the bishop the Rev. Alfred Louderbeck of Trinity Church in Davenport was elected the chairman. At this gathering, the constitutions and canons for the new diocese were adopted, and plans were made for the election of a bishop. On October 18, 1854, the Rev. Henry Washington Lee, rector of St. Luke's Church in Rochester, New York was elected bishop at Trinity Church in Davenport.

The Diocese of Iowa began participating in Education in Ministry in 1989. It is a theological extension program of the School of Theology of the University of the South. Trinity and St. Paul's Indian Mission in Sioux City were the original centers for the people of Iowa to gather for the program.

=== Storm damage ===
Lightning struck the church during an early morning thunderstorm on August 9, 2010. Significant damage was done to the bell-cote on the front of the church and an iron cross on top.
