= First Interstate Bank =

First Interstate Bank may refer to:

- First Interstate Bancorp of Los Angeles, California, which merged with Wells Fargo in 1996
  - Several buildings formerly named for the bank, now known as
    - Aon Center (Los Angeles), California
      - a fire in this building on May 4, 1988, may be referred to as the First Interstate Tower fire
    - Fountain Place, Dallas, Texas
    - Library Tower, Los Angeles, CA
    - Wells Fargo Plaza (Houston), Texas
    - Wells Fargo Center (Portland, Oregon)
    - Wells Fargo Center (Seattle), Seattle, Washington
- First Interstate BancSystem, Billings, Montana bank since 1984

== See also ==
- First Bank (disambiguation)
- First Interstate Bank Center, Redmond, Oregon
