= First Presbyterian Church (Muscatine, Iowa) =

- U.S. National Register of Historic Places
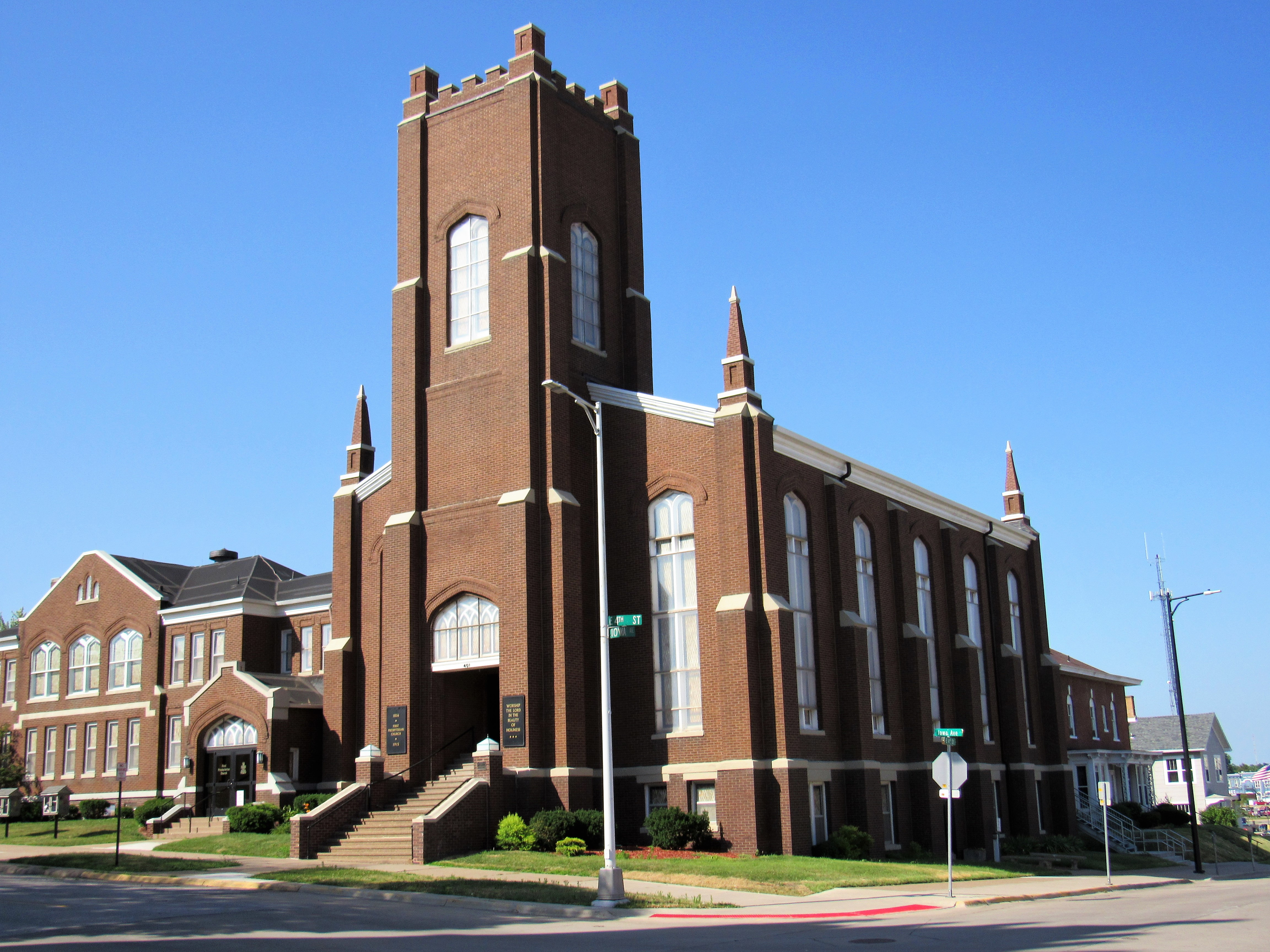

- Location within Iowa Location within the United States
- Location: 401 Iowa Ave. Muscatine, Iowa
- Coordinates: 41°25′22″N 91°2′51″W
- Built: 1858
- Architectural style: Gothic Revival
- NRHP reference No.: 77000544
- Added to NRHP: September 14, 1977

First Presbyterian Church is a Presbyterian Church (USA) church located in Muscatine, Iowa, United States. It, along with the attached Sunday School building, were listed on the National Register of Historic Places in 1977.

== History ==
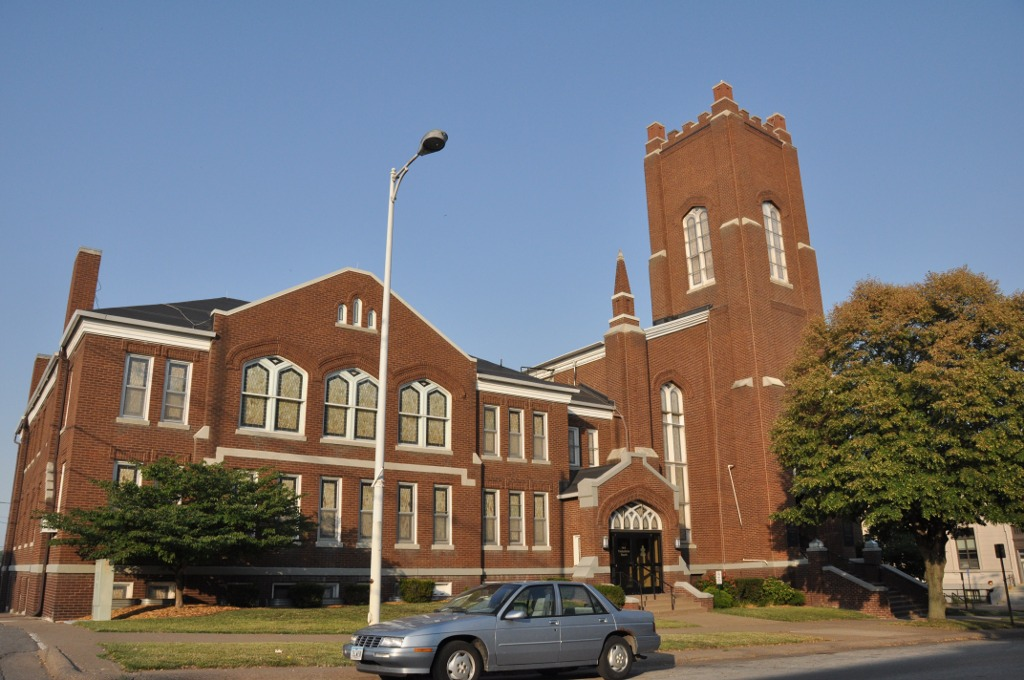
Classroom wing

The congregation was initially organized in 1839. It was the first presbytery established in Iowa. On February 2, 1842 the Rev. John Stocker became the first pastor and the church itself was organized with the following members: Elizabeth R. Stocker, Harvey Gillete, Azel Farnsworth, Jane Lathrop, Priscilla Burdit, William Hill, Isabella Ogilvie, Martha Vanatta, Rebecca Smith, Almira Lockwood and Ann Farnsworth. At first the congregation did not have a building of its own and they worshiped in a building called the People's Church, which was a union meeting house, a building occupied by Trinity Episcopal and the Masons, and a log school house.

The congregation erected its first church building in 1849 when the Rev. John Hudson was the pastor. The building measured 35 by 40 feet (11 by 12 m) and was located at the corner of Mulberry Street between Third and Fourth Streets. The first Iowa Synod in the Presbyterian Church was organized here in 1852. By 1856 the congregation outgrew the building and plans were made for a new one.

The present church building was built at the corner of Iowa Avenue and Fourth Street. The Gothic Revival style structure was dedicated in 1859. The dedicatory address was delivered by the Rev. W.S. Plummer, D.D., of the Western Theological Seminary in Allegheny, Pennsylvania.

The classroom wing was added to the church in 1915. The building was listed as an American Presbyterian and Reformed Historical Site in 1976, and the following year it was placed on the National Register of Historic Places. The sanctuary was remodeled in 2004-2005. The renovation featured a larger gathering space in the narthex.

== Architecture ==
The church building is a rectangular structure, built on a raised basement, that follows a basilica plan. The exterior is composed of red brick, and the early Gothic Revival style exhibits Tudor Revival elements. The building is five bays in length and divided by buttresses capped with white stone weatherings. It is also three bays wide. The shallow, gable roof features a narrow wood cornice. The three-stage central tower on the main facade includes the primary entry on the lower level and a belfry at the top. It is capped with a crenelated parapet. The door at the primary entrance is deeply recessed within a four-centered arch with a tracery-window transom. Pinnacles are located in each corner of the facade.

The Sunday School building sits to the north of the church. The plan and massing of the structure is Neoclassical with Gothic Revival details that repeat those of the church. The two-story structure is on a raised basement, and capped with a hip roof. The facade features a three-bay gabled pavilion. The windows are rectangular overall with the exception of the second floor windows in the central pavilion, which have four-centered arches. The building also reflects the neighboring church with the white trim around windows and white stone for the water table.

The two buildings are connected by an entrance pavilion. The stone trim and shape of the gable end reflects the pavilion of the Sunday School building. The wide Tudor arch and tracery panel at the entrance reflects the church's entry. The church, Sunday School building and the entrance pavilion form a U-shaped complex.
