= First National Bank of Florida =

The First National Bank of Florida is a bank headquartered in Milton, Florida, with branches in Pensacola, Pace, Navarre and Destin. It is not to be confused with the First National Bank of Miami which became Southeast Banking Corporation which later failed in 1992.
