= Paul V. Hyland =

American architect

Paul Vincent Hyland
- Born: May 12, 1876; Chicago, Illinois
- Died: June 1966 (aged 90)
- Education: Niagara University, New York; Charlottenburg Institute, Berlin, Germany
- Occupation: Architect
- Practice: Lincoln, Nebraska from 1900 to 1923
- Buildings: First National Bank Building (Lincoln, Nebraska); Terminal Building (Lincoln, Nebraska)

Paul Vincent Hyland (1876–1966) was an American architect in Chicago, with a Lincoln, Nebraska office. He designed several works which are listed on the National Register of Historic Places.

== Biography ==
Hyland was born in Chicago, Illinois on May 12, 1876. He studied at West Division High School and, in New York State, at Niagara University. He started in architecture in 1895 as a draftsman and supervisor for various firms including Holabird & Roche; D.H. Burnham & Co.; Benjamin H. Marshall; Mundie & Jensen; and Shepley, Rutan and Coolidge. He studied at Berlin, Germany's Charlottenburg Institute in the late 1880s; he was at D.H. Burnham and Company in the 1890s. He established his own firm in 1900 which was open until 1923.

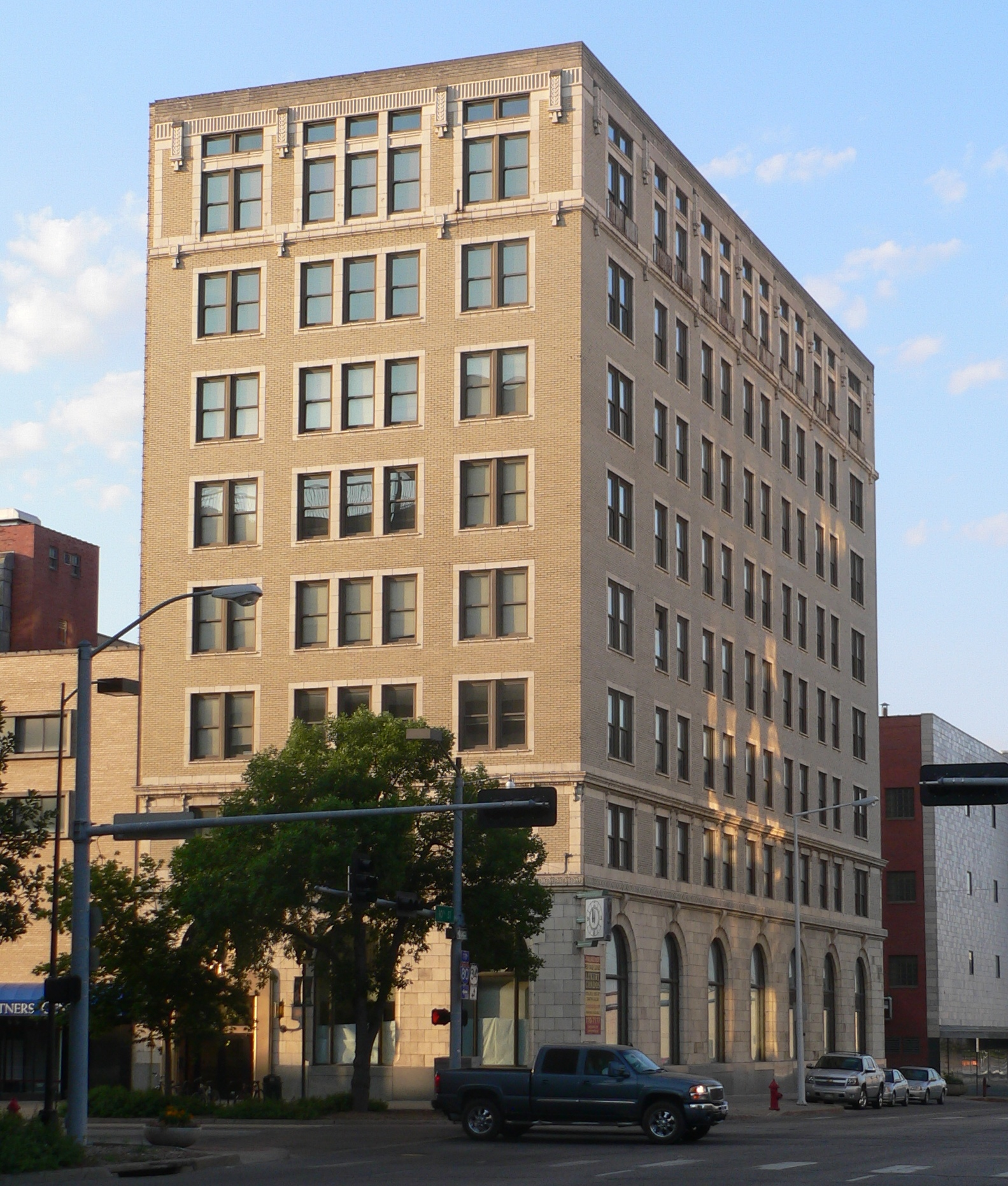
First National Bank building, located at 1001 O Street (southeast corner of 10th and O) in Lincoln, Nebraska; seen from the northwest

He served in World War I as a Major the U.S. Army Quartermaster Corps in Washington, D.C. from March 1918 to April 1919.

He returned to Chicago and partnered with Redmond Prindiville Corse (1888–1971), in the firm Hyland & Corse from 1919 to 1931. He returned to architecture in 1933 and worked until 1942 in various Chicago area firms.

He also worked as an estimating engineer for the Federal Civil Works Administration, worked as architect and buildings appraiser for Ward T. Huston & co., as engineer inspector for the Federal Emergency Administration of Public Works, and as specification and estimating engineer for Sanderson & Porter.

He was married to Lillian Mahler in 1898. He moved to Los Angeles, California in 1952 and he died in June 1966.

== Notable works ==
Works include (with attribution): Hyland & Green, based in Chicago, designed some works listed on the National Register.

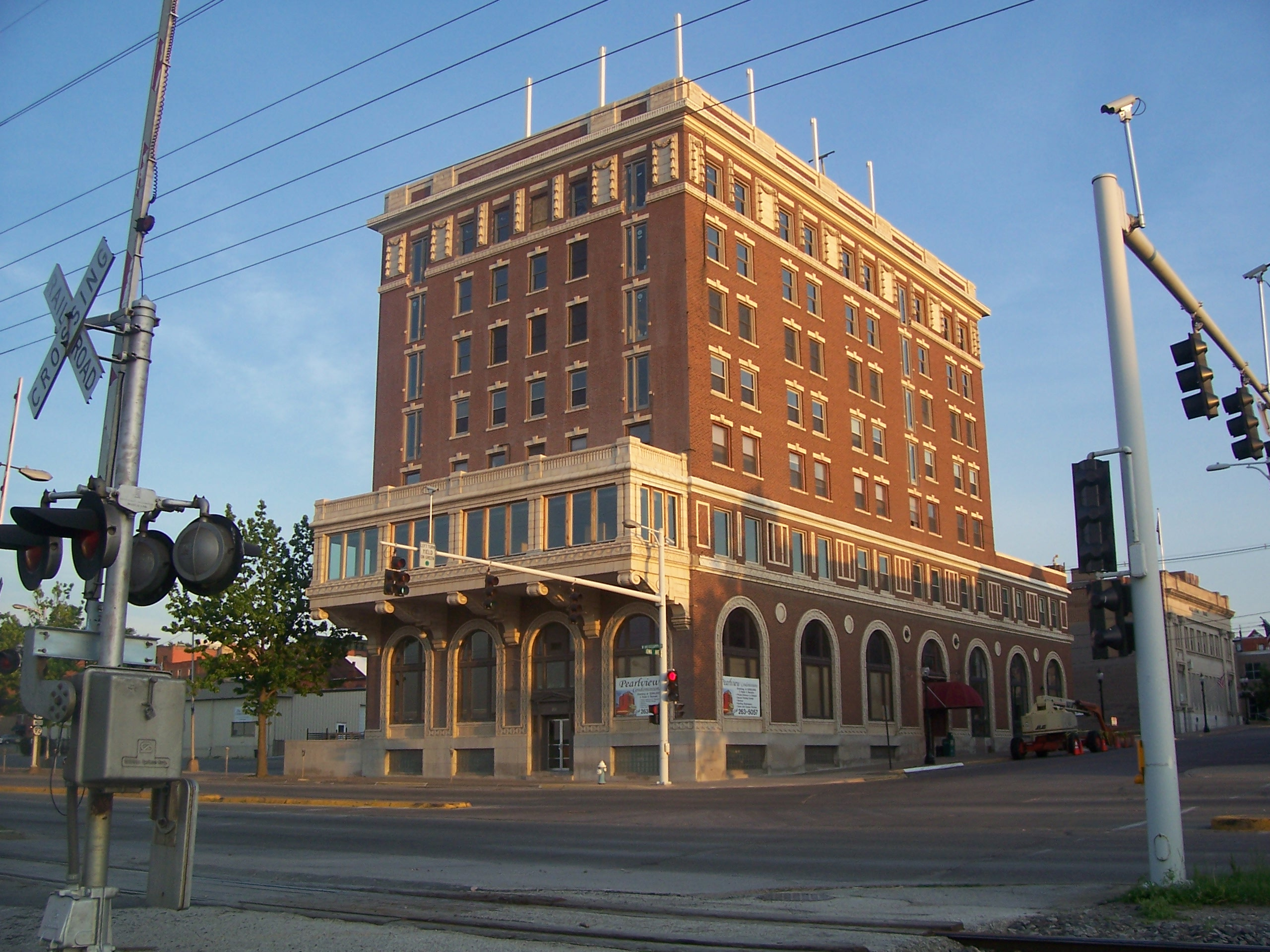
Hotel Muscatine in Muscatin, Iowa, built 1914–15

- First National Bank Building (1911), 1001 O Street, Lincoln, Nebraska, (Hyland & Green), NRHP-listed
- Two works in the NRHP-listed Downtown Commercial Historic District of Muscatine, Iowa:
  - The Hotel Muscatine (1914–15), 101 West Mississippi Drive, an expensive-in-its-time building, a seven-story building which was the tallest in Muscatine until the 1970s.
  - The Laurel Building (1916–17), 101 East 2nd Street, a six-story combination department store and office building, long the "other" tall building in Muscatine.
- Terminal Building (1915), 947 O Street, Lincoln, Nebraska, (Hyland, Paul V.), NRHP-listed "(it may be the case that the building was actually designed by Joseph G. McArthur, an architect in Hyland's Lincoln office")
- Frank and Nelle Cochrane Woods House (1916), 2501 Sheridan Boulevard, Lincoln, Nebraska (Hyland, Paul H.), NRHP-listed
- First National Bank (1923), 101 South Jefferson, Mount Pleasant, Iowa, (Hyland, Paul V.), NRHP-listed
- McAffee House, Lincoln, Nebraska
