= First American Bank (Illinois) =

Commercial bank headquartered in Elk Grove, Illinois

First American Bank is a commercial bank headquartered in Elk Grove, Illinois United States. It is an Illinois chartered non-national bank and is not related to any banks by the same name outside of the states of Illinois, Florida and Wisconsin. It is a Federal Deposit Insurance Corporation member.

== General ==
First American Bank was chartered in 1974 in Illinois as "First American Bancorp, Inc." to serve the Chicago area. The company was dissolved in 1990 to be restructured under its current name. It is a privately owned company with 80% of its assets owned by the officers, directors, and family members.
