= First National Bank (Terre Haute, Indiana) =

- U.S. National Register of Historic Places
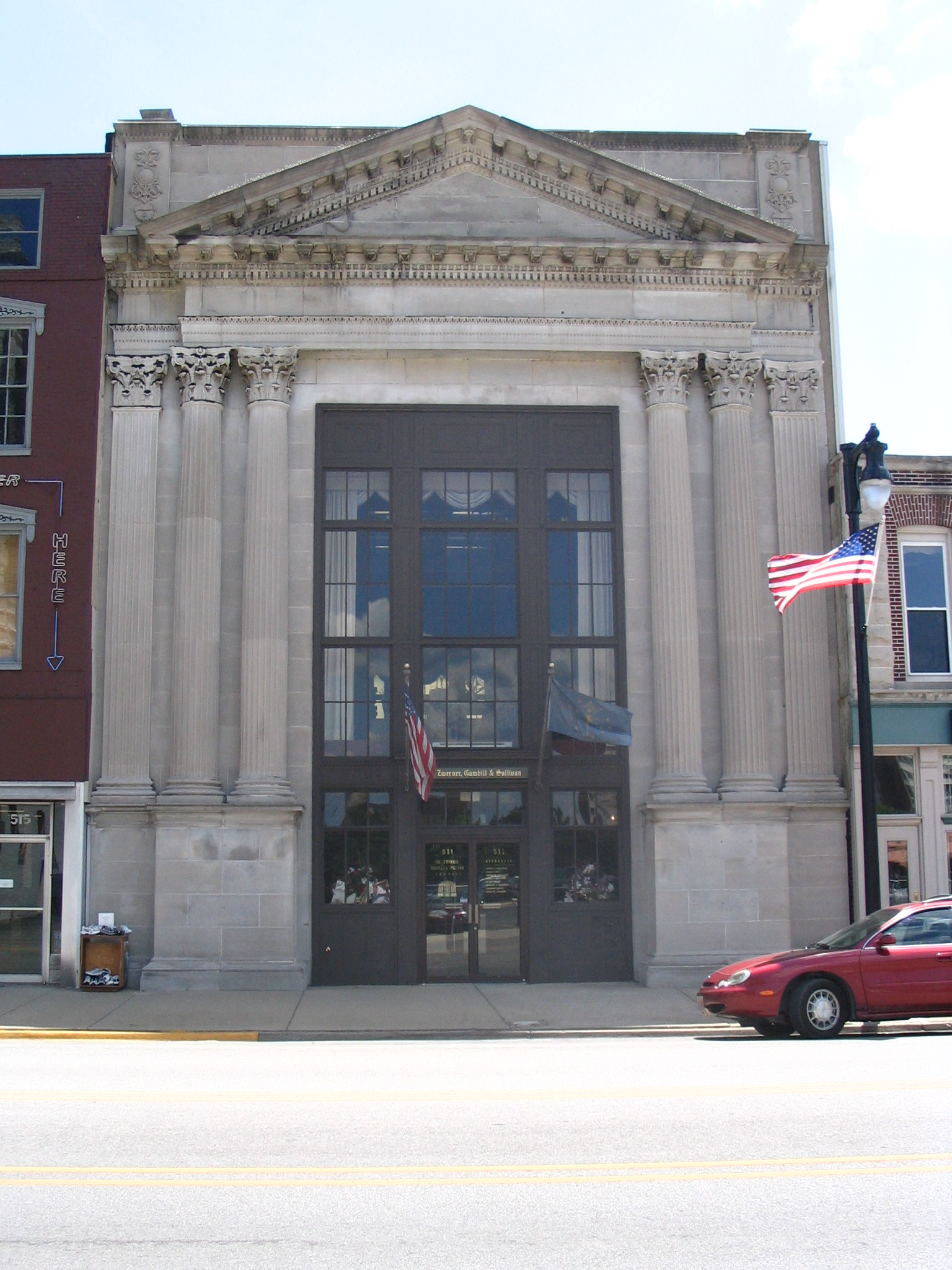
- First National Bank Building. July 2007

- Location within Vigo County, Indiana Location within Indiana Location within the United States
- Location: 509 Wabash Ave., Terre Haute, Indiana
- Coordinates: 39°27′59″N 87°24′39″W
- Area: less than one acre
- Built: 1892, 1928
- Architect: Jenny, H.; Snapp, T.S.
- Architectural style: Classical Revival
- MPS: Downtown Terre Haute MRA
- NRHP reference No.: 83004576
- Added to NRHP: May 7, 1992

The First National Bank is a historic bank building located at Terre Haute, Indiana. It was built in 1892 and remodeled in 1928, and is a two-story, Classical Revival style limestone building. It features a central pedimented pavilion supported by Corinthian order columns.

It was listed on the National Register of Historic Places in 1992.
