= Andrew Welch Homestead =

Historic house in Maine, United States

- U.S. National Register of Historic Places
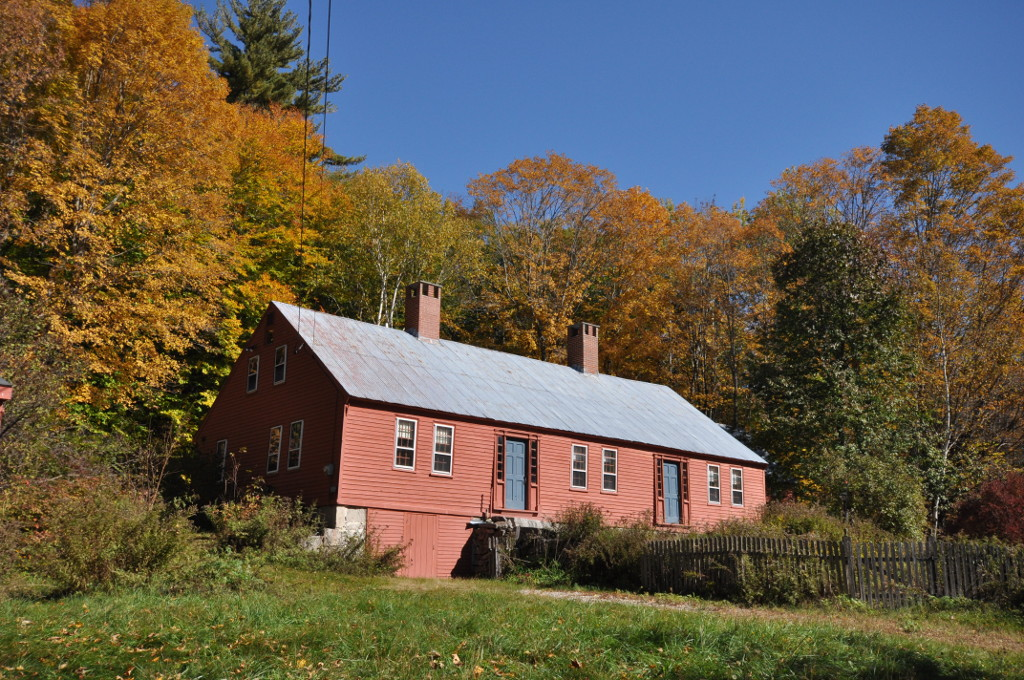

- Location within Maine Location within the United States
- Location: 1286 Middle Rd., Parsonsfield, Maine
- Coordinates: 43°42′47.7″N 70°53′20.2″W
- Area: 4.9 acres (2.0 ha)
- Built: 1814
- Architectural style: Georgian, Federal
- NRHP reference No.: 02000352
- Added to NRHP: April 11, 2002

The Andrew Welch Homestead is a historic house at 1286 Middle Street in Parsonsfield, Maine. With a complex construction history dating to the late 18th century, this house illustrates the evolutionary adaptative reuse and alteration of buildings during the early 19th century, combining two structures of different ages behind a Federal period facade. The house was listed on the National Register of Historic Places in 2002.

== Description and history ==
The Welch Homestead is set on the north side of Middle Street, just east of its junction with Cross Street and several miles east of the village center. It is a wide 1 1/2-story wood-frame structure, with a metal roof, clapboard siding, and a stone foundation. The roof is pierced by two brick chimneys, each set on the ridge line, slightly to one side of one of the two front-facing entrances. The house is eight bays wide, with six unadorned windows asymmetrically placed, and two entrances, each with flanking sidelight windows and an entablature above. A small carriage barn is attached to the building's northeast corner. The interior of the house provides the clearest evidence of the building's conjoined nature, with one side exhibiting Georgian period woodwork, the other Federal.

Part of the main block was certainly standing by 1806, when Andrew and Eliza Welch were recorded as having their first child. Local tradition holds that the older portion of the house originally stood in the town center, and was built by Job Colcord, an early settler of the area, and used as a tavern. The tavern was located next to the meeting house, whose religious congregants may have objected to its presence. It is believed that the tavern was moved to land that was later purchased by Andrew Welch. Welch may have acquired the old Colcord Tavern and attached it to his house to accommodate his growing extended family, which by the 1830s included the family of his son Cyrus.

== See also ==
- National Register of Historic Places listings in York County, Maine
