= First Federal Bank =

First Federal Bank may refer to:

- First Federal Bank of California
- First Federal Bank of the Midwest
