= Welch Apartments =

- U.S. National Register of Historic Places
- U.S. Historic district – Contributing property
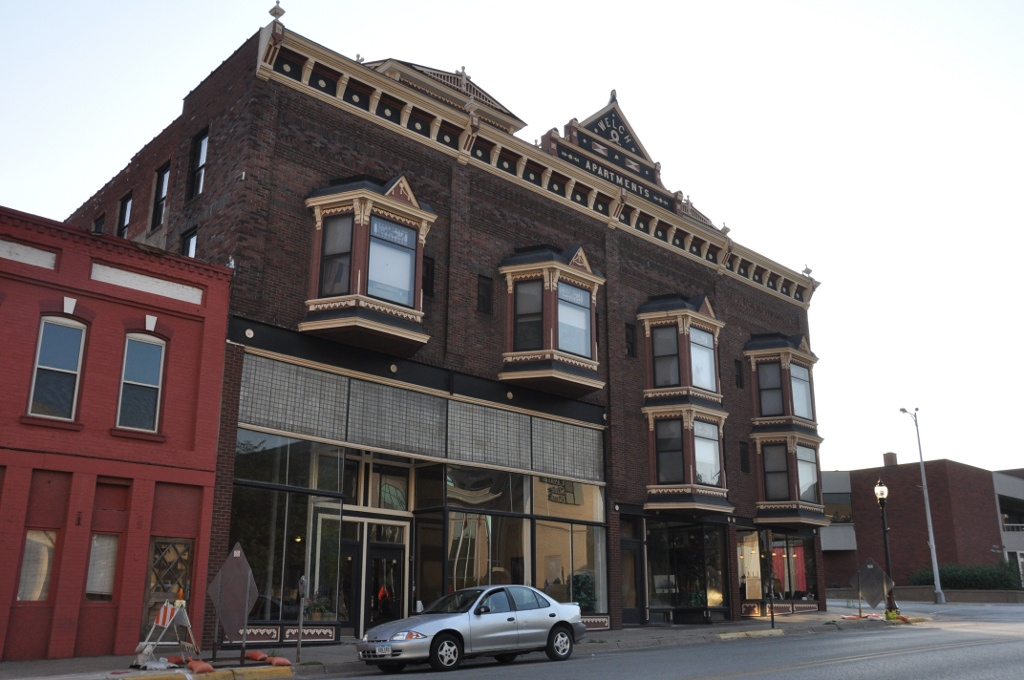

- Location within Iowa Location within the United States
- Location: 224 Iowa Ave. Muscatine, Iowa
- Coordinates: 41°25′18″N 91°02′47″W
- Area: less than one acre
- Built: 1900
- Architectural style: Italianate
- Part of: Downtown Commercial Historic District (ID06000423)
- NRHP reference No.: 79000921
- Added to NRHP: January 15, 1979

Welch Apartments is an historic building located in downtown Muscatine, Iowa, United States. The Scott House hotel existed on this property prior to this building, which was constructed about 1900. The Italianate-style building contain 26 units with different floor plans. The main floor contains commercial space. The four-story structure measures 120 by 80 feet (37 by 24 m). The dominant feature of the exterior is the bay windows that protrude from the wall surface. The pressed-metal cornice unifies the building's composition. High parapet gables are located above the cornice. They are executed in the Flemish Renaissance style. The building has been listed on the National Register of Historic Places since 1979. It became a contributing property in the Downtown Commercial Historic District in 2006.
