= First National Bank Building (Lincoln, Nebraska) =

- U.S. National Register of Historic Places
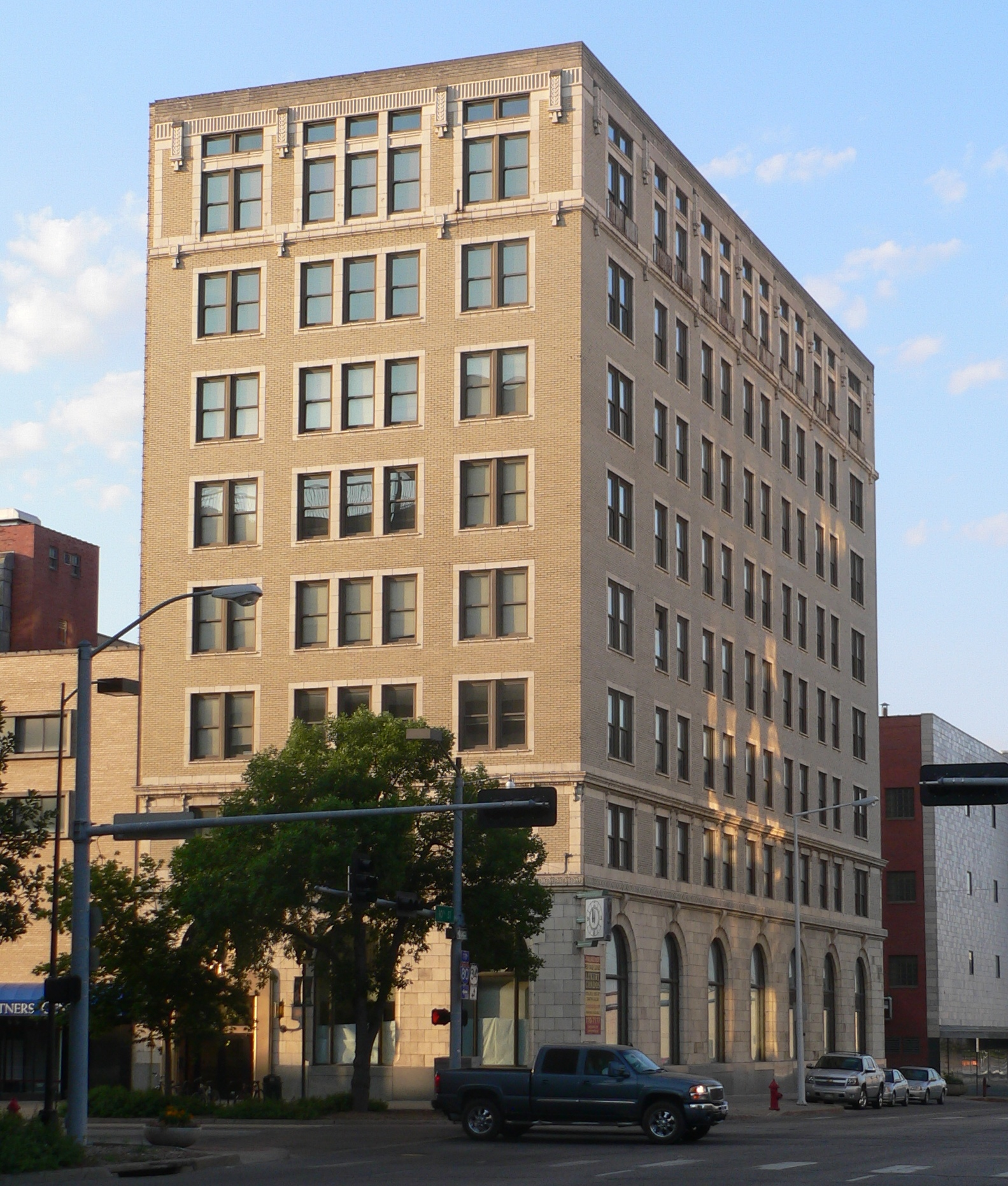
- The building in 2012

- Location within Nebraska Location within the United States
- Location: 1001 O Street, Lincoln, Nebraska
- Coordinates: 40°48′44″N 96°42′16″W
- Area: less than one acre
- Built: 1911
- Built by: Selden-Breck Co.
- Architect: Hyland & Green
- Architectural style: Early Commercial
- NRHP reference No.: 98000190
- Added to NRHP: March 5, 1998

The First National Bank Building is a historic 8-story office building in Lincoln, Nebraska. It was built by Selden-Breck Co. in 1911 for the First National Bank, founded by Civil War veteran Amasa Cobb in 1871. It was designed in the Commercial style by Hyland & Green, an architectural firm based in Chicago. It has been listed on the National Register of Historic Places since March 5, 1998.
