= Welch-Hurst =

Historic ranch in California, United States

- U.S. National Register of Historic Places
- Judge J. R. Welch Ranch
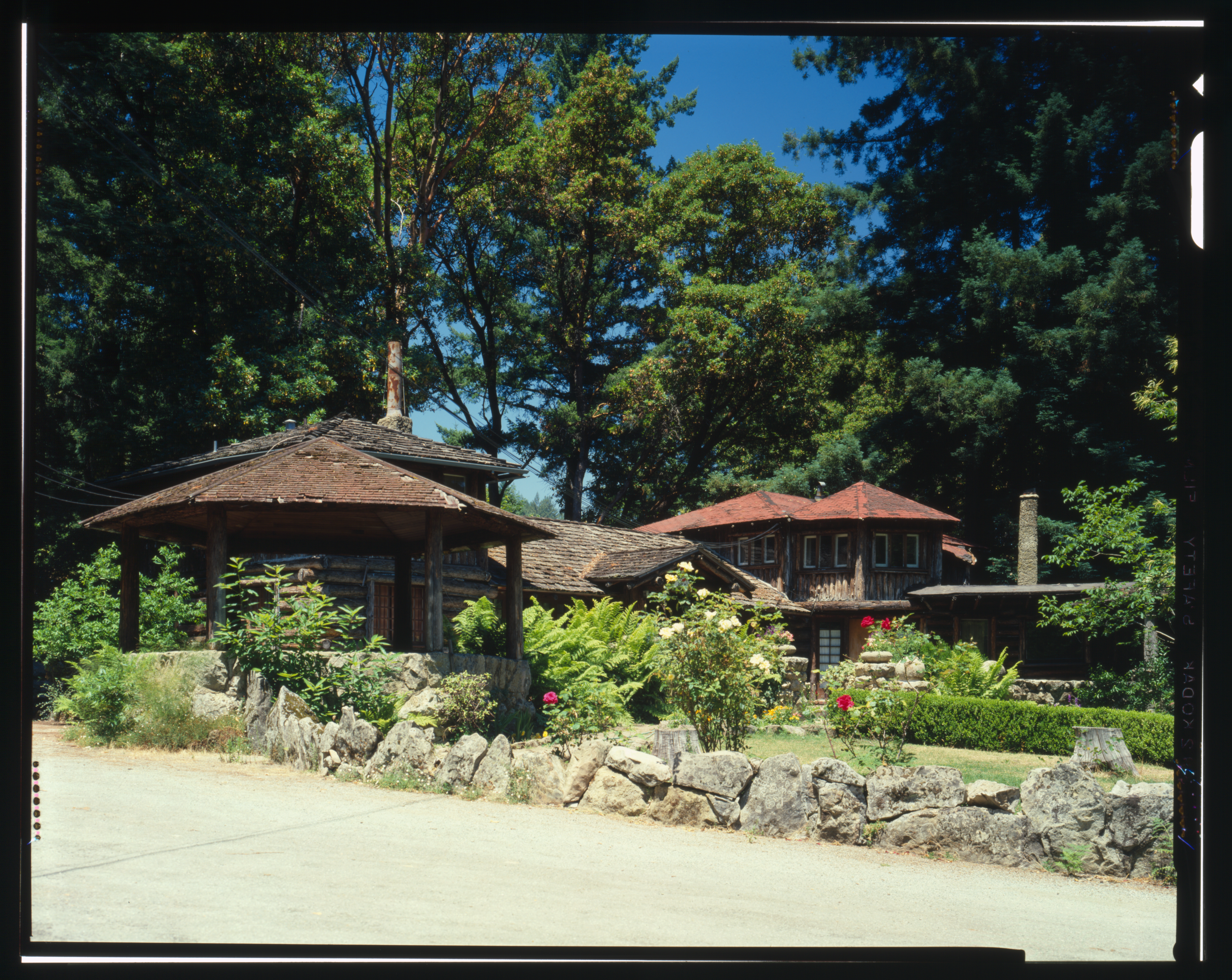
- Welch-Hurst Ranch

- Location within San Jose, California
- Location: 15800 Sanborn Road, Sanborn County Park, Saratoga, California, US
- Coordinates: 37°14′22″N 122°04′22″W
- Area: 800 acres (320 ha)
- Built: 1908
- Architectural style: American Craftsman
- NRHP reference No.: 78000785
- Added to NRHP: September 18, 1978

Welch-Hurst, also known as the Judge J.R. Welch's Ranch, is a historic gentleman's working ranch and family retreat in Saratoga, California. This ranch represents an early example of American Craftsman-style architectural, built for Judge James R. Welch. The Welch-Hurst ranch was placed on the National Register of Historic Places on September 18, 1978.

== History ==
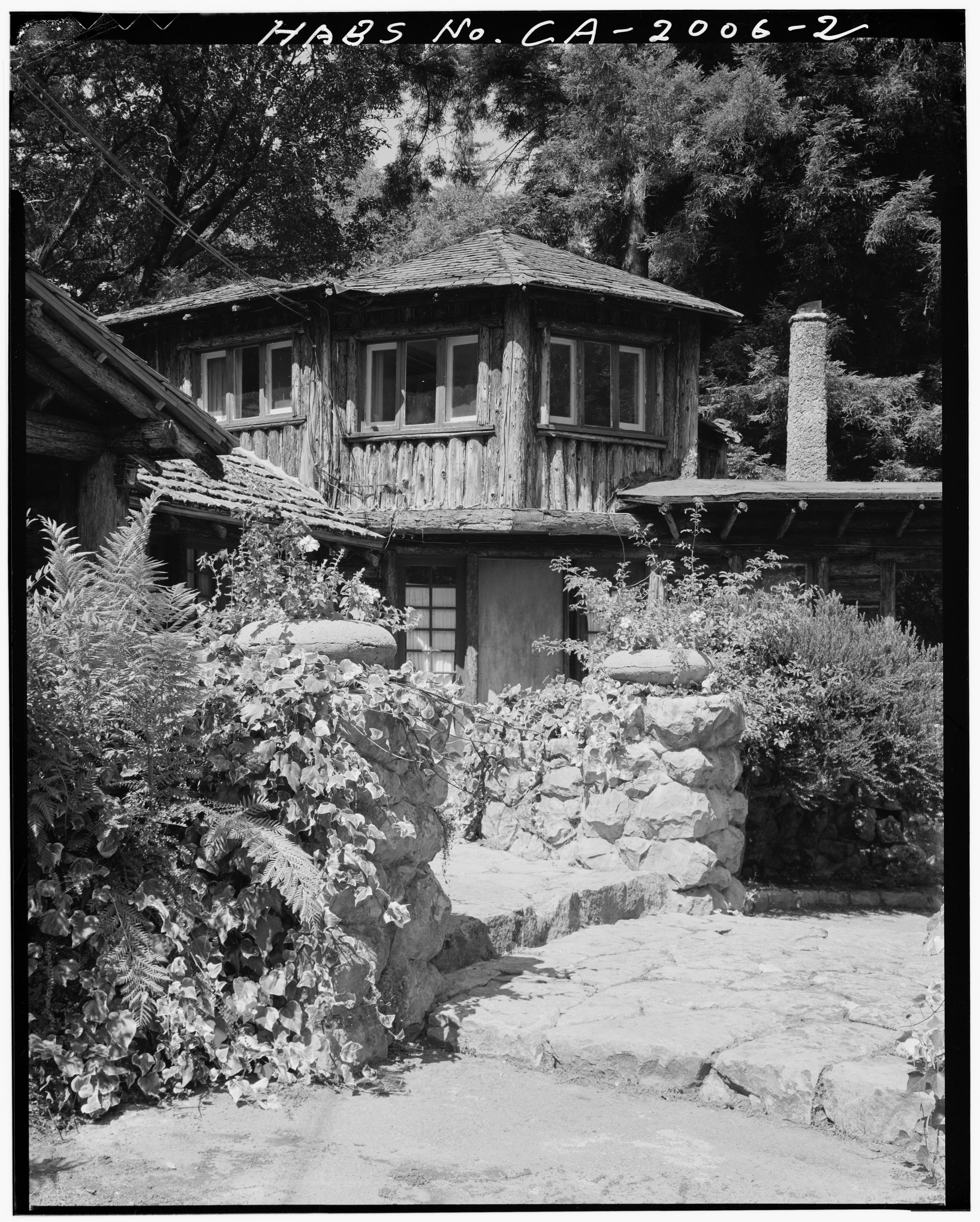
Northeast entrance of Welch-Hurst, 15800 Sanborn Road, Sanborn County Park, Saratoga, Santa Clara County, CA.

In 1902, the Superior Court Judge for Santa Clara County, James R. Welch (1860-1931), established an 800 acres (320 ha) estate on land acquired from McElroy, Bonjetti, and Pourroy. In 1908, the Welch-Hurst Ranch was constructed as a vacation residence. This log-style house is both a gentleman's working ranch and a summer retreat for his family. Welch expanded the estate by introducing orchards and transforming a sag pond into a water feature with a waterfall.

James Ray Welch was born on February 2, 1860, in Plainview, Illinois. In 1866, he and his family relocated to Missouri. The economic hardships of the 1870s compelled Welch to strike out on his own at the age of fourteen, leading him to Boise, Idaho. There, he attended public school and, by the time he turned twenty, he had become a teacher and assistant principal. In Montana, he fought alongside the U.S. Army against Native American tribes. In 1882, he made San Jose his home, enrolling at the University of the Pacific and Heald's Business College while simultaneously serving as Principal of the university's Commercial department. He went into the legal field, and he was granted admission to the bar in 1886. He practiced law in the office of Judge John E. Richards. Welch served as the City Attorney of San Jose from 1894 to 1897 before transitioning into private practice. His legal career was from 1901 to 1931, where he held a position on the State Superior Court. The James R. Welch Papers can be accessed through the Online Archive of California. This collection of documents was originally in the possession of Judge James R. Welch and his daughter, Ione Welch. After Judge Welch's passing, Ione donated these papers to the archive.

Welch held a prominent position in the community, recognized for his civic-minded dedication. He served as a board member for the California Prune and Apricot Growers Association, which would later evolve into the Sunsweet Growers Cooperative. He played a role in successfully advocating for the preservation of the Skyline Highway as a scenic route along the Santa Cruz Mountains' crest, which was officially opened in 1929.

Upon Judge Welch's passing in 1931, the Welch family retained ownership of the house until 1955 when it was acquired by "America's Uranium King", Vernon J. Pick, who established a 200-person electronics company on site In that year, Pick purchased the 800 acres (320 ha) Welch-Hurst ranch, situated near Sanborn Road on Big Basin Way, for a total of $101,000 (equivalent to $1,213,882 in 2025). Pick renamed the estate Walden West after the cabin by a pond in Henry David Thoreau's book Walden.

During the 1960s and 1970s, the ranch changed hands between multiple owners. In the 1970s, Sanborn County Park expanded through a series of land acquisitions, and in 1977, the property was purchased by the Santa Clara County. The main house was at risk of demolition, but it was rescued by the American Youth Hostel in 1979. They undertook the necessary repairs and maintenance of the building, ultimately operating it as Sanborn Park Hostel. In 2010, the hostel was forced to close in the face of increasing insurance costs and reduced international travel after 9/11. The hostel took pride in offering the most budget-friendly rates in the United States, charging $14 per night at the time of it closing.

On June 4, 2019, the County of Santa Clara Board of Supervisors granted approval to the Sanborn County Park Master Plan. Their goal is to explore strategies for safeguarding and elevating the historic Welch-Hurst structures. Once these enhancements are complete, the Welch-Hurst Area can once more assume a role as a destination within Sanborn County Park.

=== Design ===
Welch-Hurst, 15800 Sanborn Road, Sanborn Skyline County Park, Saratoga, Santa Clara County, CA.

Welch-Hurst Building Survey sheet, ca. 1977.

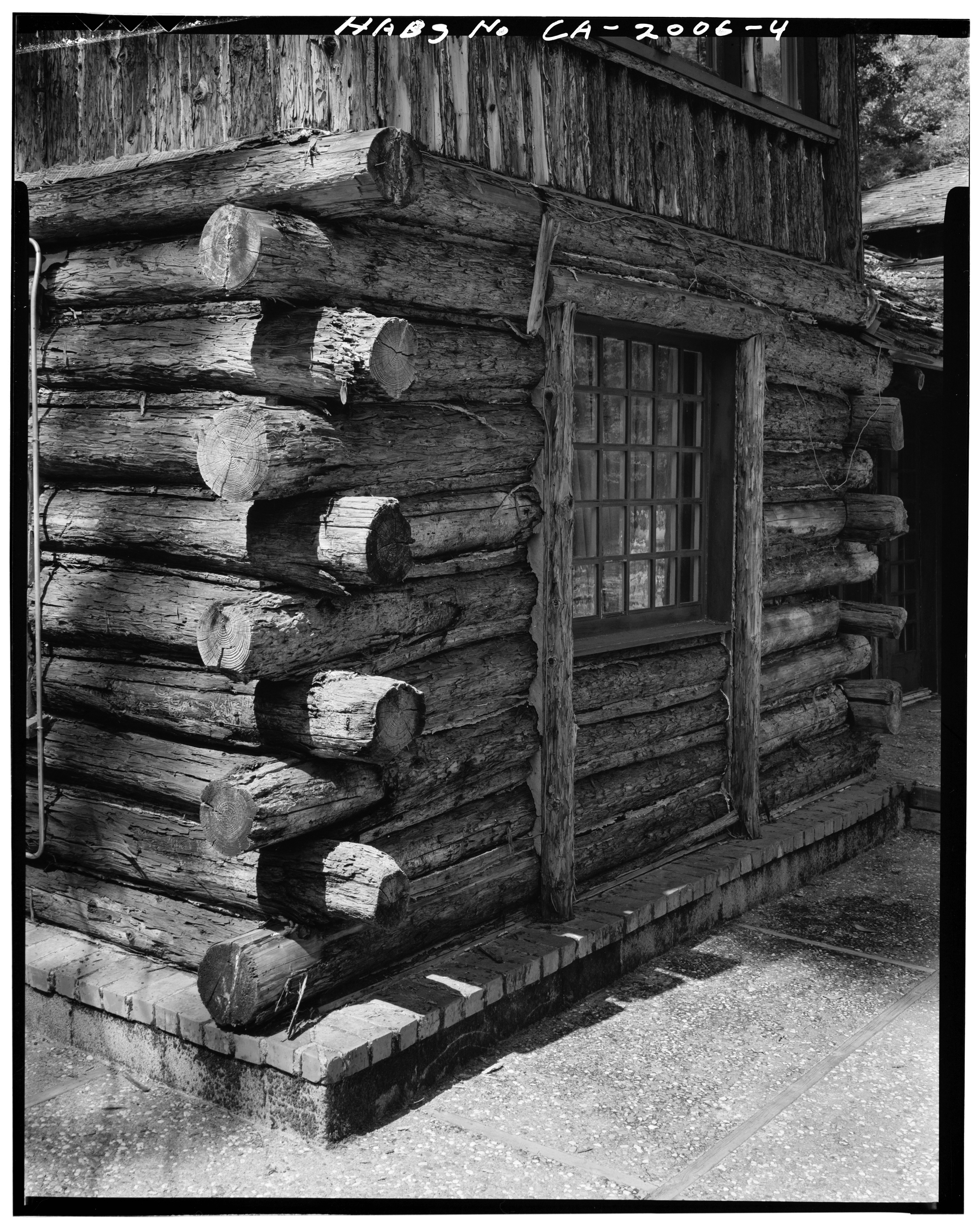
Log construction at Southeast Corner of Sanborn Road

The Welch-Hurst is a redwood log house with rustic details that follows the tradition of the California Arts and Crafts movement. What sets this estate apart within the county is its use of indigenous materials and integrating the house with a hillside forest. The front of the house overlooks a series of terraces and landscaped grounds. Toward the southwest, there is an artificial pond with an island. The house exhibits an irregular plan, with overall dimensions measuring 82 ft (25 m) by 128 ft (39 m). The southwestern wing has a stone block foundation, while the central area relies on mud sills for support. The northwest section is constructed with concrete, and the northern section features robust stone foundation walls. The exterior walls are crafted from halved redwood logs, preserving the full circular section where they project at the corners. On the ground floor, the logs are oriented horizontally, while on the upper floor, they are placed vertically.

Part of the roof relies on support from the log walls, with no evident frame system beneath the half-log veneer. Within the primary room, a truss system can be observed; however, it does not extend to the gable walls, and the lower chords seem to terminate over the door and window openings, suggesting a decorative rather than structural function. The front entrance porch features a gable roof that is upheld at its outer edges by vertical logs resting on two stone pedestals. Additionally, two gazebos can be found on the eastern facade, with the northern one abutting the building and both being supported by vertical log posts.

There are fireplaces in both the living room and in the north wing. Both chimneys sport an exterior finish of rugged, coarse aggregate concrete. The living room chimney is crowned with a tall, cylindrical sheet metal flue. The main entrance features a spacious oak door adorned with four beveled glass lights. The doorway is flanked by sidelights composed of 22 vertical window panels. The door leading to the kitchen is a 10-light window panel. Within the living room, six double glass doors provide ample light and access. Most of the windows in the building are swinging casement windows, some featuring multiple panes, while others are single large lights. The southwestern wing boasts a hipped roof, while the central section features a gable roof with interruptions caused by the gables of the entrance porch and the stairway. The north wing's roof has an irregular design. Large shakes predominantly make up the roofing material. Both gazebo roofs take the form of six-sided pyramids, and they are covered with shakes.

A basement can be found beneath the north wing. The first floor of the southwestern wing comprises two bedrooms with a shared bath situated between them at the far southwest and features a spacious living room that connects to a hexagonal dining room. The dining room serves as the central hub of the house. To its northwest, there is a kitchen and other service areas. There is an attached family room wing. Access to the second floor is provided by the main staircase, which leads into the living room in the southwest wing. This staircase is constructed with polished log posts and half-log steps, and the balustrade is partially supported by uniquely shaped manzanita branches. The staircase consists of three runs, with a substantial landing following the initial run of two steps, and a smaller landing after the second run. Above the first floor's southwest arrangement, two bedrooms are situated with a bathroom between them, mirroring the layout below. Located above the north wing, are two bedrooms, a cedar closet, and a bathroom. An additional staircase, added at a later time, connects these bedrooms to the first floor.

The living and dining rooms feature wooden paneling. In the living room, the ceiling displays exposed wooden decking, rafters, and trusses. Meanwhile, the dining room's ceiling is constructed with boxed beams adorned with recessed panels. In the remaining rooms, the walls are either painted or covered with wallpapered plaster. Some spaces also feature acoustical tiled ceilings. The house is fully equipped with electrical lighting and heated by two forced hot air furnaces. It is positioned on a relatively flat area on the western slopes of the Santa Cruz Mountains.

== Historically significant ==
Welch-Hurst holds historical significance in architecture as an early American Craftsman-style gentleman's working ranch and family retreat and because of ranch's association with Judge James R. Welch. On September 18, 1978, the Welch-Hurst was placed on the National Register of Historic Places.

== See also ==
- National Register of Historic Places listings in Santa Clara County, California
