= First Westroads Bank =

American financial company

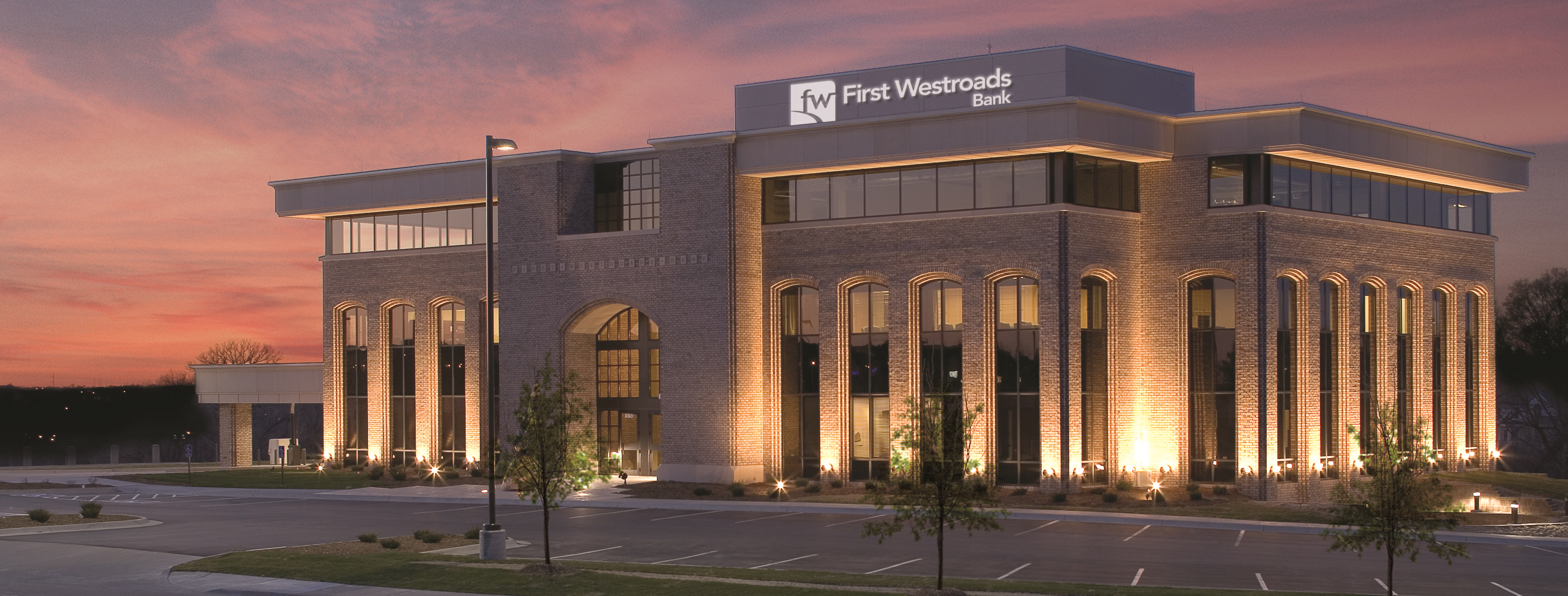
- Industry: Finance
- Founded: Omaha, Nebraska 1967
- Headquarters: Omaha, Nebraska, United States
- Key people: Chris J. Murphy, Chairman; Mark Ellerbeck, President & CEO
- Products: Financial services
- Parent: Ameriwest
- Website: www.firstwestroads.bank

First Westroads Bank is a locally owned community bank in Omaha, Nebraska, United States, with two branches. First Westroads Bank provides personal and business banking services, as well as investment services through First Westroads Investment Centre, a division of the bank. The bank has received a 5-star rating from Bauer Financial for the past 87 consecutive quarters.

== History ==
First Westroads Bank was chartered in 1967 as an independent, suburban, commercial bank with a state license. The new bank occupied space in the developing Westroads Shopping Center.

The original location was in a trailer located in the south mall parking lot, but was moved indoors to the home office of "270 Italia Mall" in the spring of 1968. In addition to the indoor location, there was also a drive-thru, television-controlled facility located in the south parking lot which was connected by a tunnel and tube carrier system, later converted to a manual drive-in, walk-in facility in 1973.

A second three-lane, drive-up location was opened in the NBC Center area at 10855 West Dodge in January 1977, which has since been known as the "Old Mill" headquarters location.

In 1979 the bank was sold to United Bancshares of Nebraska, Inc., a one bank holding company, where it would remain until 1990 when it was purchased by Ameriwest, a holding company owned by current bank owners, Chris and Betsy Murphy.

After a short period of temporary building, parking lot and trailer locations, the Westroads Mall Branch made its permanent home in the new building at 612 N. 98th Street in 2002. The corporate headquarters location remained in the Old Mill area until March 2005 when it re-located to its current home, 15750 West Dodge Road.

First Westroads Bank is active in the Omaha community and is a Project PAYBAC partner for Aldrich Elementary School and Kiewit Middle School in Millard Public Schools.

== Financial performance ==
First Westroads Bank has been named a Top Performing Community Bank by the American Bankers Association Banking Journal, based on its earnings, asset quality, and capital. The bank has also received a 5-star financial strength rating by independent bank rating institution Bauer Financial for the past 70 consecutive quarters, as of June 2026.

== Executive Board ==
As of 2023, the executive board includes:

- Daniel J Murphy, chairman, First Westroads Bank
- Chris J. Murphy, chairman emeritus, First Westroads Bank
- John Nahas, president, Corporate Management Consulting
- Stephen F. Robinson, retired president, First Westroads Bank
- Robert Dalrymple, retired executive vice president, division executive, Great Plains Division at Bank of the West
- Mark Ellerbeck, CEO, First Westroads Bank
- Nathan Christ, president & CLO, First Westroads Bank
- Margie Heller, CFO, First Westroads Bank
- Matthew DeBoer, global director of transportation architecture, HDR, Inc.

== Bank Officers ==
As of 2026, the bank officers are the following:

Name	Position
Daniel J. Murphy	Chairman
Mark Ellerbeck	Chief Executive Officer
Nathan Christ	President & CLO
Margie Heller	Chief Financial Officer
Chris J. Murphy	Chairman Emeritus
Carl E. Bartholomew	Senior Vice President
Timothy J. Riha	Senior Vice President
Brett Michael	Senior Vice President
Rob Glorvick	Senior Vice President
Ken Wray	Vice President

== See also ==
- Economics of Omaha
