= First American Bank =

First American Bank may refer to several independent banks in the United States:

- First American Bank (Alabama) of Decatur, Alabama, now part of RBC Bank
- First American Bank (Illinois)
- First American Bank (Indiana)
- First American Bank (Louisiana)
- First American Bank (Oklahoma)
- First American Bank (Texas), now Citibank Texas N.A.
- First American Bankshares, Washington, D.C., the American unit of the Bank of Credit and Commerce International
- First American National Bank, Georgia, Kentucky, Louisiana, Mississippi and Tennessee, (defunct, now part of Regions Financial via its merger with AmSouth Bancorporation)
