= First National Bank Building (Craig, Colorado) =

- U.S. National Register of Historic Places
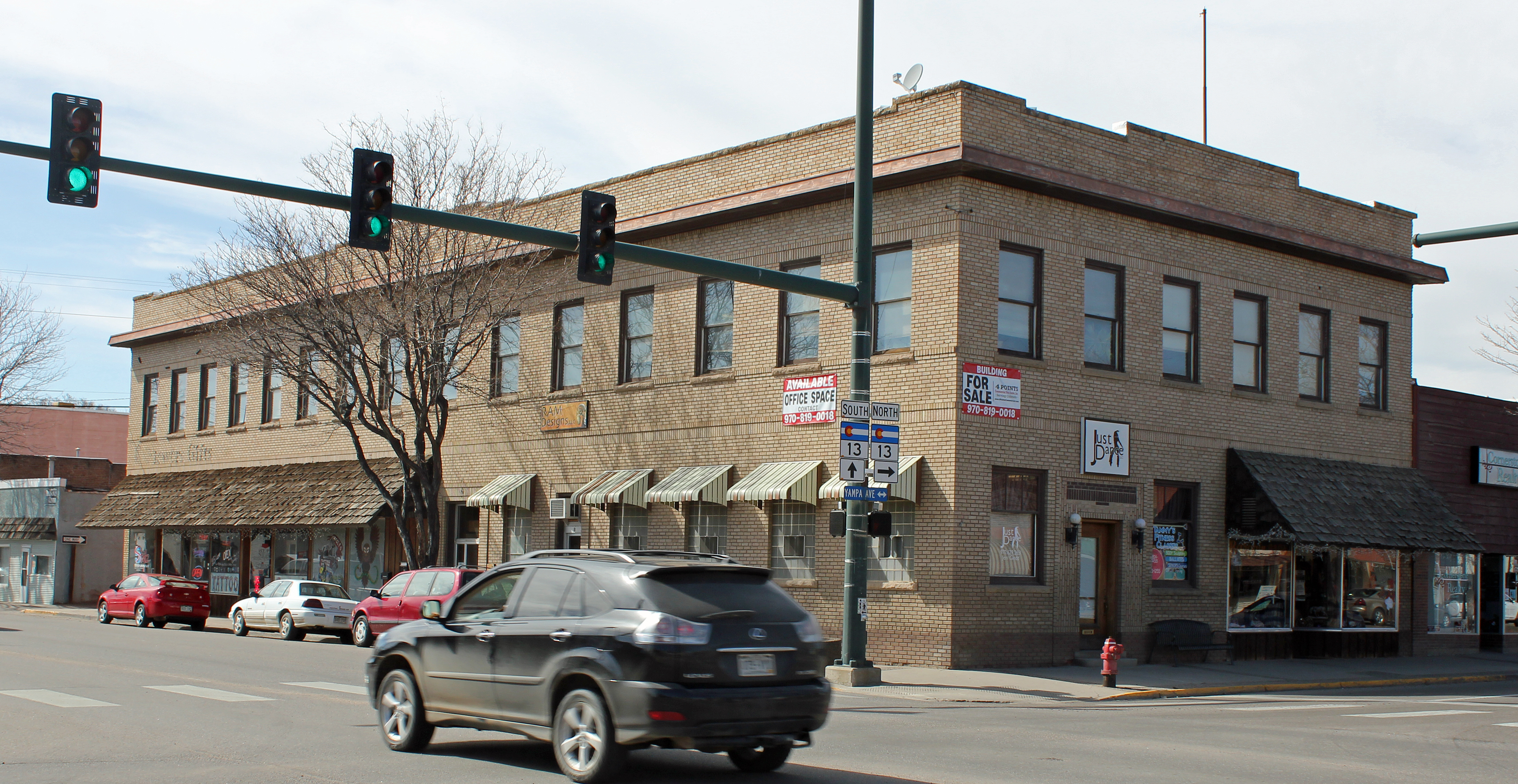

- Location within Colorado Location within the United States Location within the United States
- Location: 502-506 Yampa Ave., Craig, Colorado
- Coordinates: 40°30′52″N 107°32′49″W
- Area: less than one acre
- Built: 1917
- Built by: Charles Howelson (mason)
- Architectural style: Late 19th And Early 20th Century American Movements, Early Commercial
- NRHP reference No.: 97000793
- Added to NRHP: July 17, 1997

The First National Bank Building in Craig, Colorado was built in 1917. It was listed on the National Register of Historic Places in 1997.

According to ColoradoHistory, "The two-story brick building was constructed in 1917 during the period of local economic optimism that followed the coming of the railroad in 1913. It remains Craig’s most important example of early 20th century commercial architecture."

Carl Howelson, a famous Norwegian skijumper and mason, is believed to have laid the brickwork. A man named Charles R. Taylor is associated as either the architect or contractor.
