= First National Bank Building (Ann Arbor, Michigan) =

- U.S. National Register of Historic Places
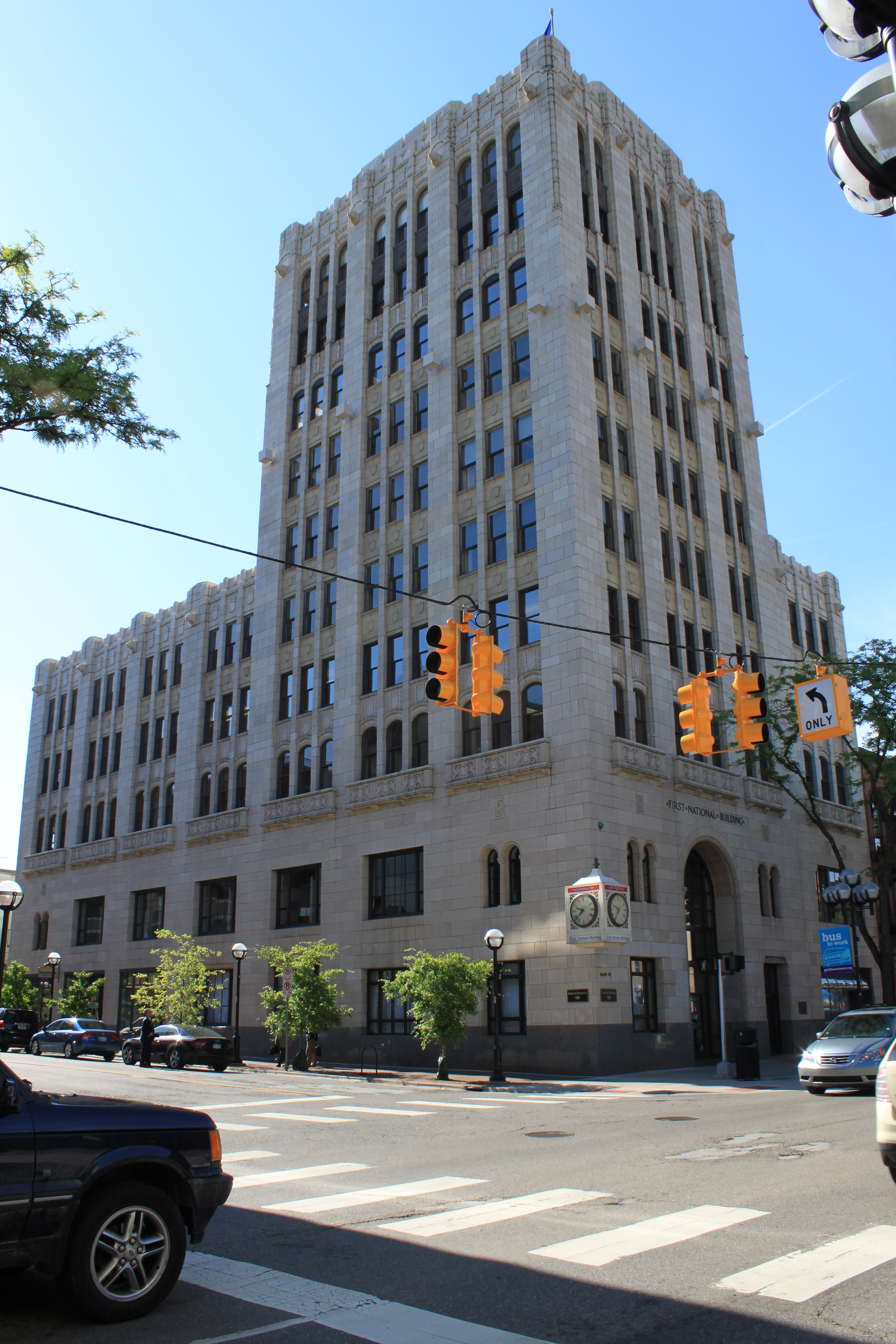
- First National Bank Building

- Location within Michigan
- Interactive map
- Location: 201 S. Main St., Ann Arbor, Michigan
- Coordinates: 42°16′48″N 83°44′54″W
- Area: 0.2 acres (0.081 ha)
- Built: 1927
- Architect: Fry & Kasurin
- Architectural style: Romanesque
- NRHP reference No.: 82000547
- Added to NRHP: November 24, 1982

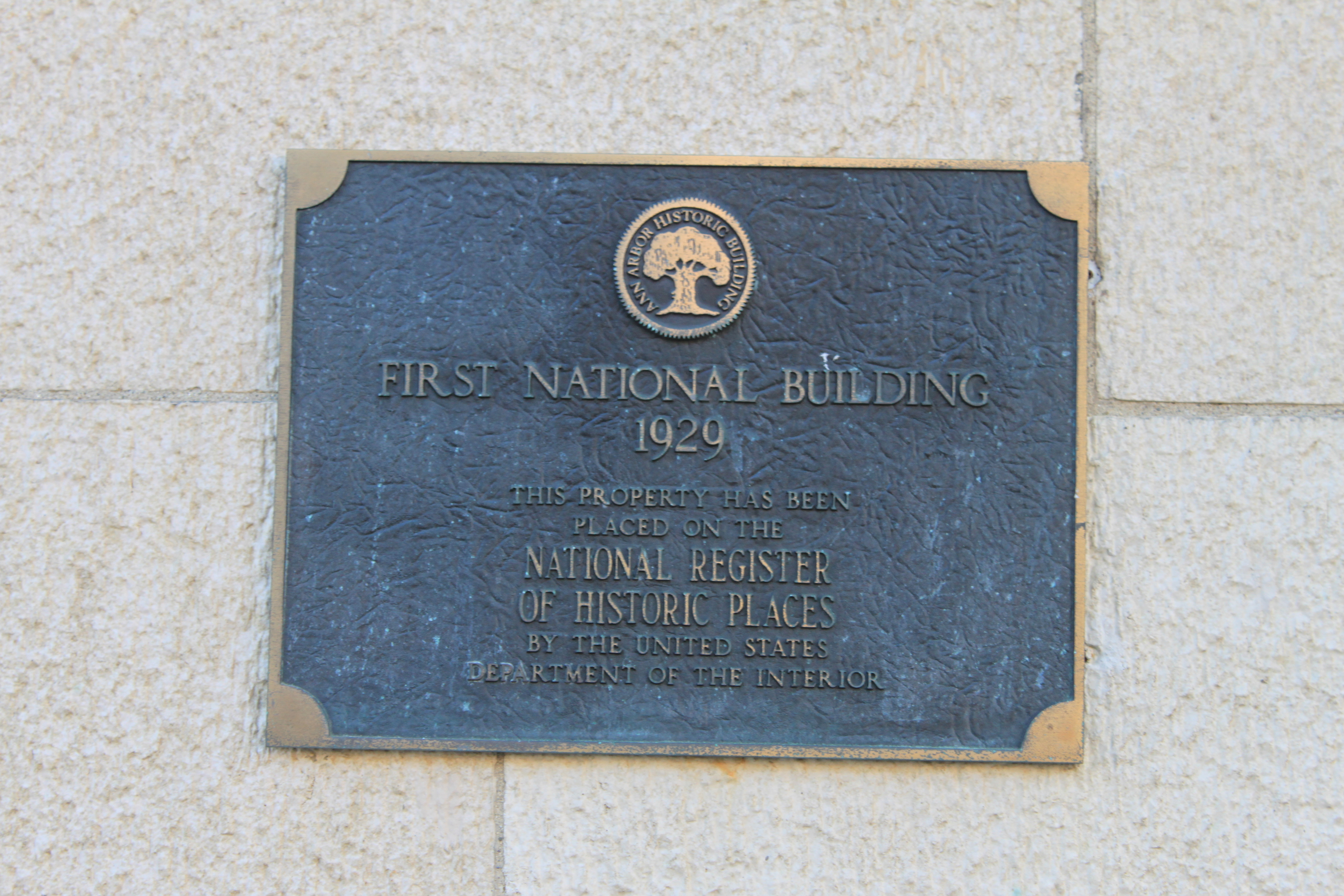
Historical marker

The First National Bank Building, also known as the First National Building, is a Romanesque Revival building in Ann Arbor, Michigan designed by the local architectural firm of Fry and Kasurin. It stands at 201-205 South Main Street in downtown Ann Arbor. The building was added to the National Register of Historic Places on November 24, 1982.

== History ==
The First National Bank was established In 1863, and was the first bank in Washtenaw County. The bank hired the Ann Arbor firm of Fry and Kasurin to design this building, and construction began in 1927. The building was completed in 1930, and was at the time the tallest building in Ann Arbor. The building housed both the bank and a number of prominent local professional firms. In 1936, First National merged with two other financial institutions and vacated the building; the former banking offices were converted into retail space.

The building was purchased by First Martin Corporation in 1981, and the company completely renovated the entire structure in 1982. As of 2018, First Martin owns and operates the building.

== Description ==
The First National Bank Building stands at ten floors in height, with rear wings of two and five stories. The building is designed with an interesting blend of Art Deco and Art moderne architectural styles. It has a steel frame, and the principal façades are clad in lightly colored terra-cotta designed in a restrained Romanesque styling. The terra cotta was executed by the Northwestern Terra Cotta Company. The terra cotta has broad vertical lines; there are gargoyles mounted near the top beneath a decorative cornice.
