= First National Bank Building (Danville, Illinois) =

- U.S. National Register of Historic Places
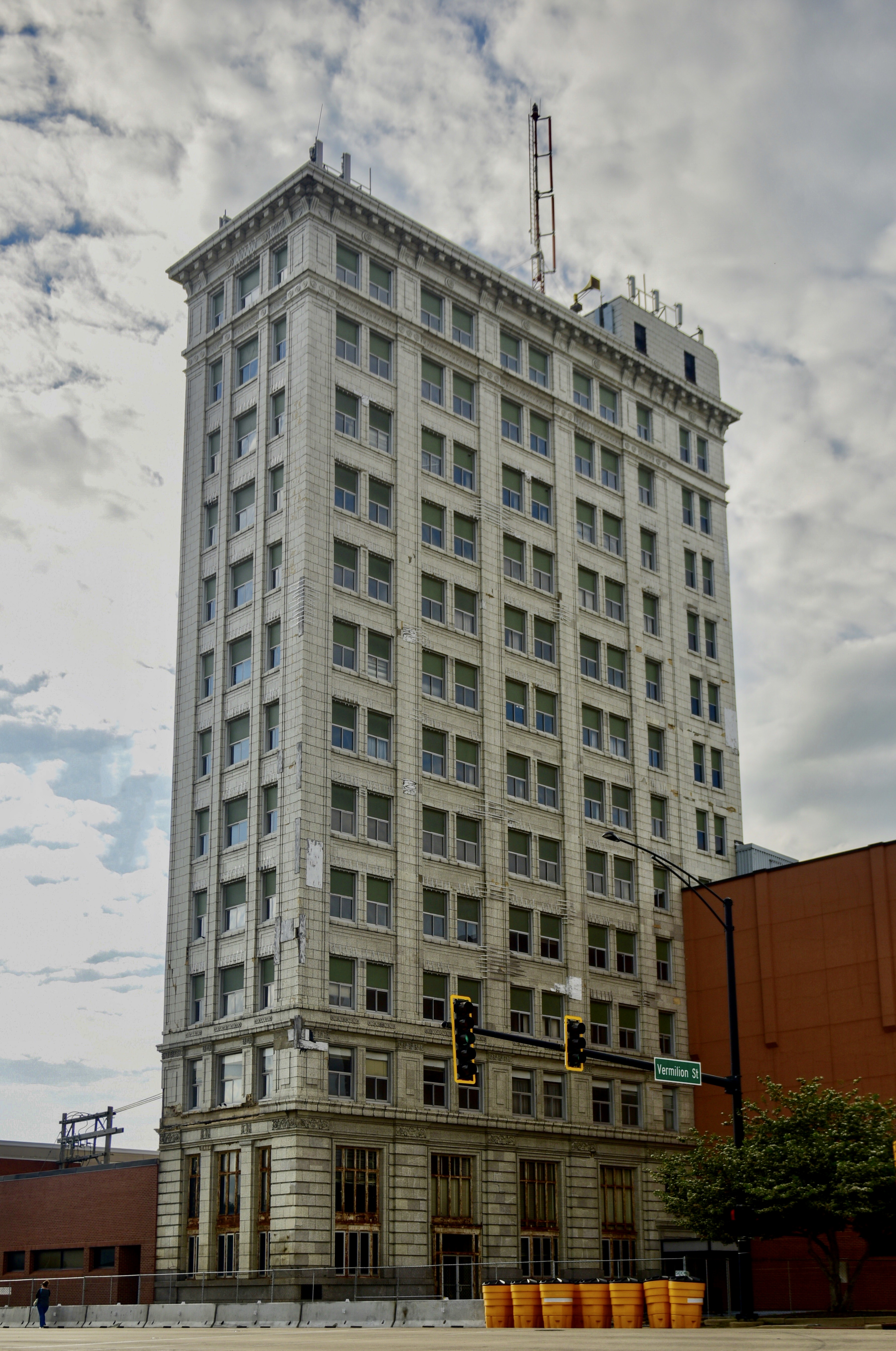

- Location within Illinois Location within the United States
- Location: 2-4 N. Vermilion St. Danville, Illinois
- Coordinates: 40°07′29″N 87°37′49″W
- Area: less than one acre
- Built: 1918
- Architect: Mundie and Jensen
- Architectural style: Classical Revival
- NRHP reference No.: 00001335
- Added to NRHP: September 13, 2018

The First National Bank Building, known locally as the Bresee Tower, was a historic bank building at 2-4 N. Vermilion Street in Danville, Illinois. The building was constructed in 1918 for the First National Bank, which was established in 1857 and had operated in another building at the same site since 1867. Chicago architecture firm Mundie & Jensen designed the building in the Classical Revival style, a popular choice which was also used in several of Danville's other banks. Like many Classical Revival skyscrapers, the twelve-story building was divided into a two-story base, a shaft, and a one-story capital to resemble a Greek column. The entire exterior of the building was clad in terra cotta, and its decorative elements included pilasters, ornate metal entrance surrounds, and a bracketed entablature.

The building was added to the National Register of Historic Places on September 13, 2018.

Demolition of the building began on the morning of May 9, 2025.
