= First National Bank Building (Smith Center, Kansas) =

- U.S. National Register of Historic Places
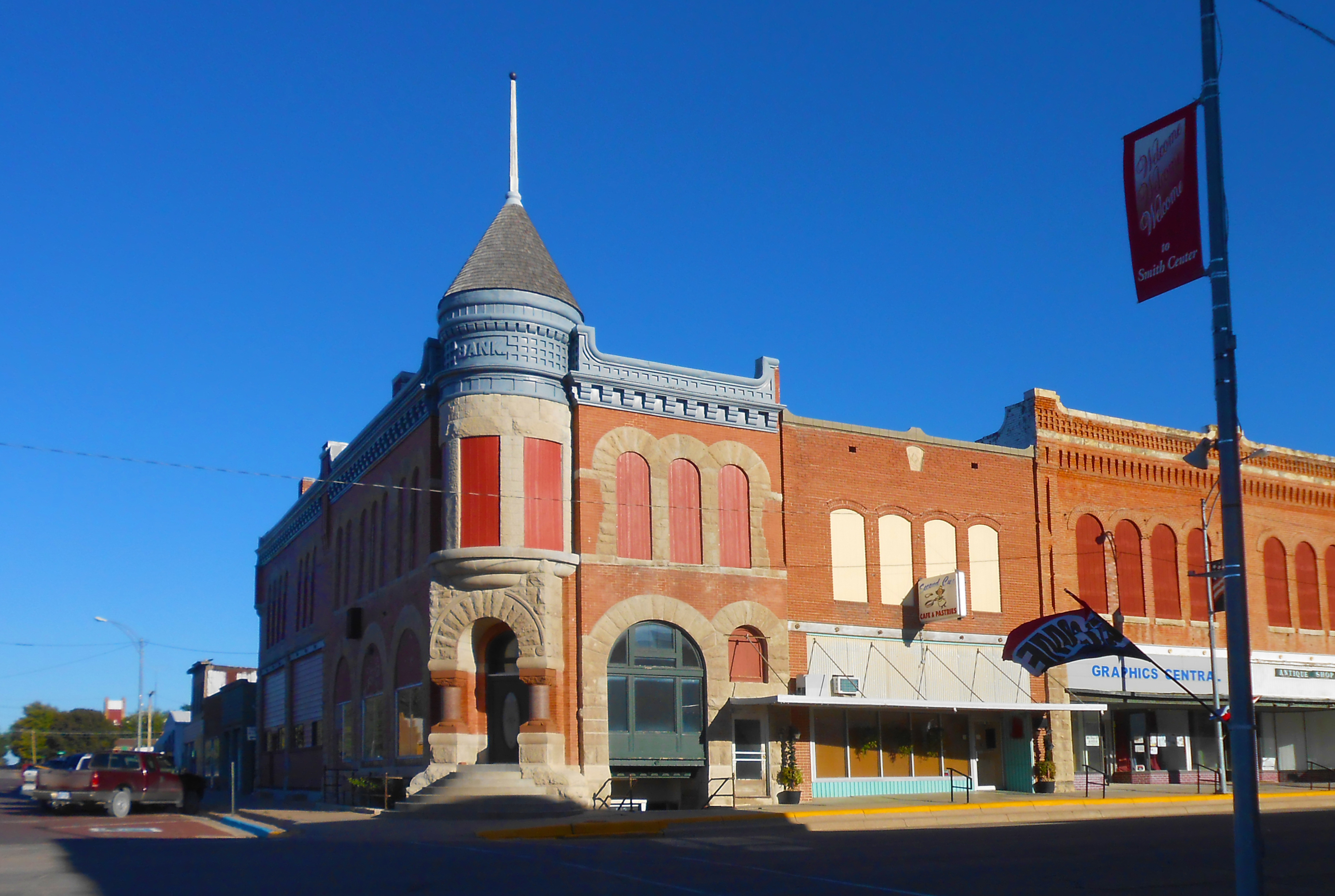

- Location within Kansas Location within the United States
- Location: 100 S. Main, Smith Center, Kansas
- Coordinates: 39.77774°N 98.78558°W
- Area: less than one acre
- Built: 1889
- Architectural style: Richardsonian Romanesque
- NRHP reference No.: 06001163
- Added to NRHP: December 27, 2006

The First National Bank Building in Smith Center, Kansas, at 100 S. Main, was built in 1889. It was the second building used by the oldest bank in the county, and served until a new bank building was constructed in 1930. It was listed on the National Register of Historic Places in 2006.

It has a red brick and stone block exterior.

It was deemed significant for its Richardsonian Romanesque architecture and substantial presence in its community. It "exhibits all of the key characteristics of the style: round-headed Romanesque arches executed in the windows and doors, an entryway that has a round-headed arch springing from short squat columns, a recessed entrance, varied rustication, and cylindrical towers with conical caps embedded in the walling."

In 2014, a local resident bought the building and with the help of local and state organizations, was able to preserve and renovate the building. The hope of the owner was to restore the building as a hub for downtown businesses.
