= First National Bank Building (Highland, Kansas) =

- Formerly listed on the U.S. National Register of Historic Places
- Location within Kansas Location within the United States
- Location: 422-424 West Main St, Highland, Kansas
- Coordinates: 39°51′35″N 95°16′08″W
- Area: Less than one acre
- Built: 1913
- Architectural style: Early Commercial
- MPS: Highland, Doniphan County, Kansas MPS
- NRHP reference No.: 08000609

Significant dates
- Added to NRHP: July 2, 2008
- Removed from NRHP: November 26, 2024

The First National Bank Building in Highland, Kansas, was built in 1913. It is located at 422-424 West Main St. It was listed on the National Register of Historic Places in 2008. It has also been known as the Highland Post Office Building.

It is a two-story Early Commercial-style building whose main portion is 40 by 50 feet (12 m × 15 m) in plan.
