= First National Bank of Davenport =

- U.S. National Register of Historic Places
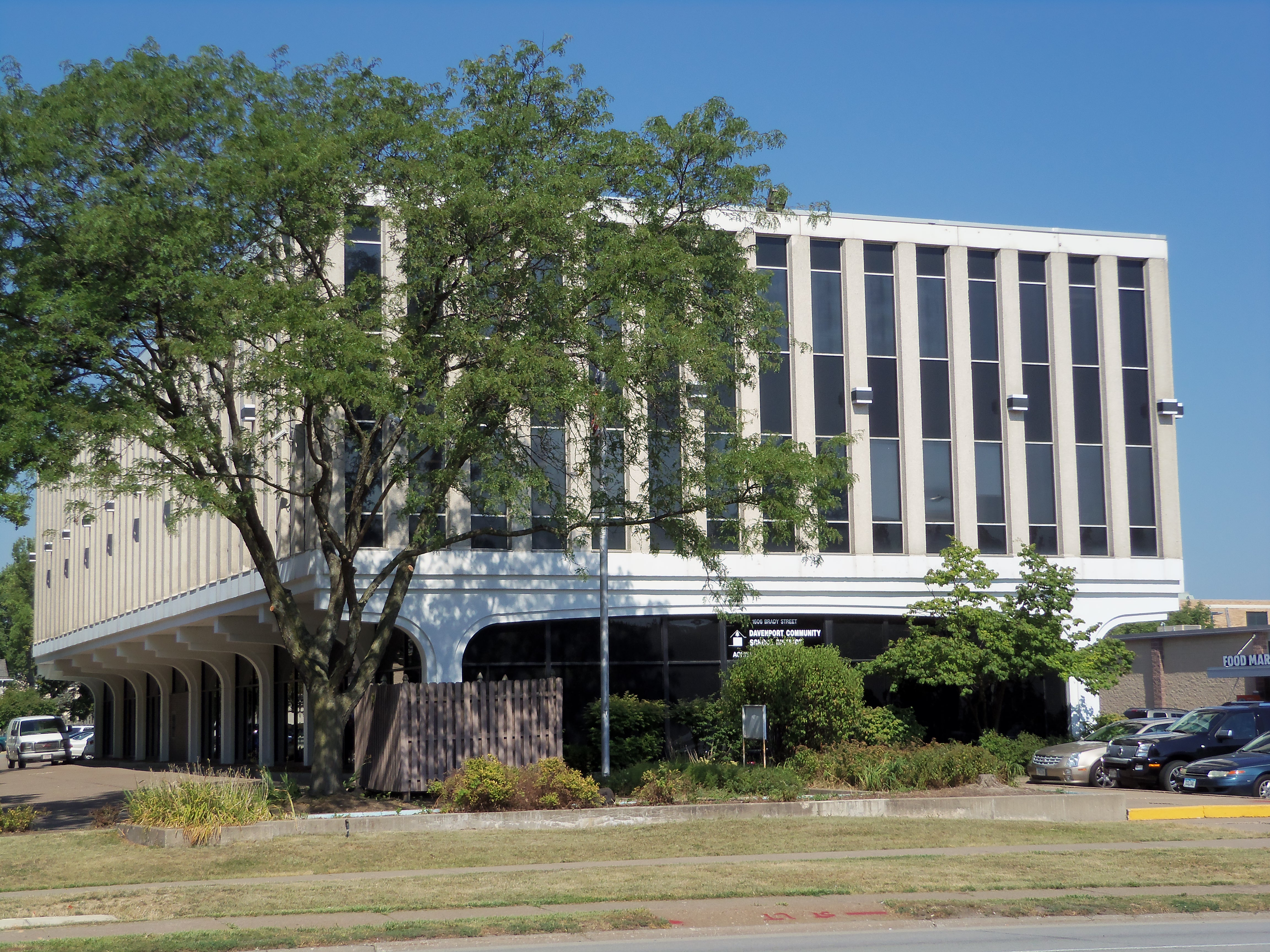
- The building in 2012.

- Location within Iowa Location within the United States
- Location: 1606 Brady St. Davenport, Iowa
- Coordinates: 41°32′10.4″N 90°34′29.3″W
- Area: 1.25 acres (0.51 ha)
- Built: 1966-1967
- Built by: Waters Construction
- Architect: Stewart-Robison-Laffan
- Architectural style: Modern Movement
- NRHP reference No.: 100002918
- Added to NRHP: September 13, 2018

The First National Bank of Davenport, also known as Brenton Bank and The Brenton, is a historic building located in central Davenport, Iowa, United States. It was added to the National Register of Historic Places in 2018. It is significant for its associations with the history of community planning and development, and as an important example of modernistic design.

== History ==
=== Town Centre Village Development ===
First National Bank of Davenport was a branch of Iowa's Brenton Bank network. It was the 14th bank in the Brenton Bank Group, which was established in 1881 in Dallas Center, Iowa.

The First National Bank building was designed to harmonize with other Mid-century modern buildings in a larger commercial development known as Town Centre Village. As the city grew to the north commercial development followed, especially after the automobile became the dominant form of transportation. Town Centre Village was located on a three block parcel of land that had previously been single-family homes. It is located on the busy Harrison-Main-Brady corridor, which connected Downtown Davenport to the south with Interstate 80 to the north. The Brady and Locust Street intersection, where the development is located, was considered the busiest intersection in Iowa at that time.

The Professional Arts Building, completed in 1963 (non-extant), was located on the north side of the development at Locust and Main Streets. The First National Bank of Davenport was initially located on the first floor of the building. The Town Centre building, a commercial building facing Main Street, and a permanent First National Bank building, facing Brady Street, were to be built to the south of the Professional Art Building in 1964. They would share surface and underground parking. To the south of them was to be a five-story Travelodge motel, with room for future expansion. However, plans changed, and the First National Bank of Davenport building was self-financed independently of its neighbors. In 1965, it acquired the property the motel, which was never realized, was to be built on. A Shell gas station was completed at Brady and Locust Streets. The three-story Mid-Town Plaza (extant) with an attached grocery store and drug store (non-extant), were later built between the Professional Arts Building and the First National Bank of Davenport. An Aldi grocery store replaced the older grocery and drug store building. Two newer commercial buildings and additional surface parking are located where the gas station and the Professional Arts Building were located.

=== Post-First National Bank of Davenport ===
After the bank discontinued its operations, the building was acquired by the Davenport Community School District for its offices and other programs. In July 2018, the District moved its operations into a former school building across the street. Newbury Living of West Des Moines, Iowa then began converting the building into a mixed-use project. Their $6.7 million transformation into The Brenton, a block of thirty-eight apartments, was completed in 2020. The apartments are located on the second and third floors of the building; the first floor is an open public gathering space. What used to be the vault of the bank has been made into a gaming room.

== Architecture ==
The three-story Modern Movement building was completed in 1967. The building is significant for its embrace of New Formalism architecture. The First National Bank Building and the Davenport Public Library building downtown are considered to be the most important examples of the style in Davenport. The First National Bank Building exemplifies the shift from historical revival styles and the more restricted expressions of Modernism. Its architects emphasized the building's structure and construction grid by placing it on an elevated base. Its concrete and steel frame structure was designed by the local firm of Stewart-Robison-Laffan. It was built by Waters Construction.

The upper floors are cantilevered over the main floor. Slit windows alternate with slim vertical structure elements. Historically, the banking operations, which included a drive-up window on the south side, were located on the main level. The upper two floors provided leased office space. Surface parking is located on the west and north sides of the building. A small lawn is located on its east side.
