= First National Bank Building (Stratford, Oklahoma) =

- U.S. National Register of Historic Places
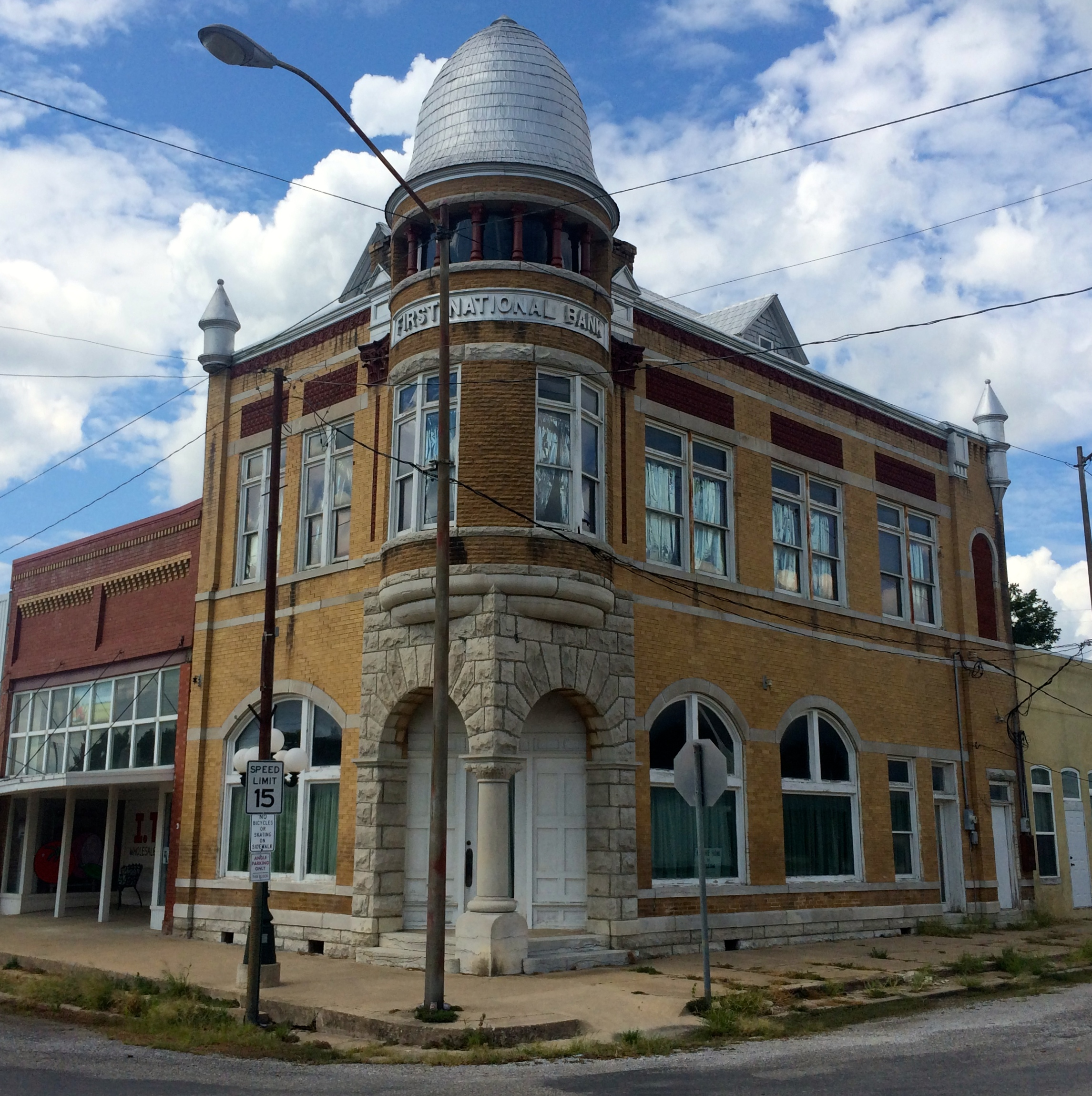

- Location within Oklahoma
- Location: 100 West Main, Stratford, Oklahoma
- Coordinates: 34°47′44″N 96°57′44″W
- Area: less than one acre
- Built: 1907
- Architectural style: Late Victorian
- NRHP reference No.: 01000659
- Added to NRHP: June 14, 2001

The First National Bank Building in Stratford, Oklahoma, at 100 West Main, was built in 1907. It was listed on the National Register of Historic Places in 2001.

It is a two-story brick building with a patterned metal hipped roof, with two gabled dormers and six brick chimneys and two "small metal towerets and an ornamented ridge cap", as well as a two-story turret. It is described as Late Victorian in style, combining elements of Romanesque Revival and Queen Anne styles, which it terms as sub-styles of Victorian. Queen Anne characteristics include the irregular massing and some details; Romanesque Revival elements include the rounded stonework arch above the building's corner entrance.

The building "is unique among the commercial buildings of downtown Stratford. The majority of other buildings in the central business district are relatively plain, one-story, brick, Commercial style resources."
