= First Commercial Bank (Odell, Nebraska) =

- U.S. National Register of Historic Places
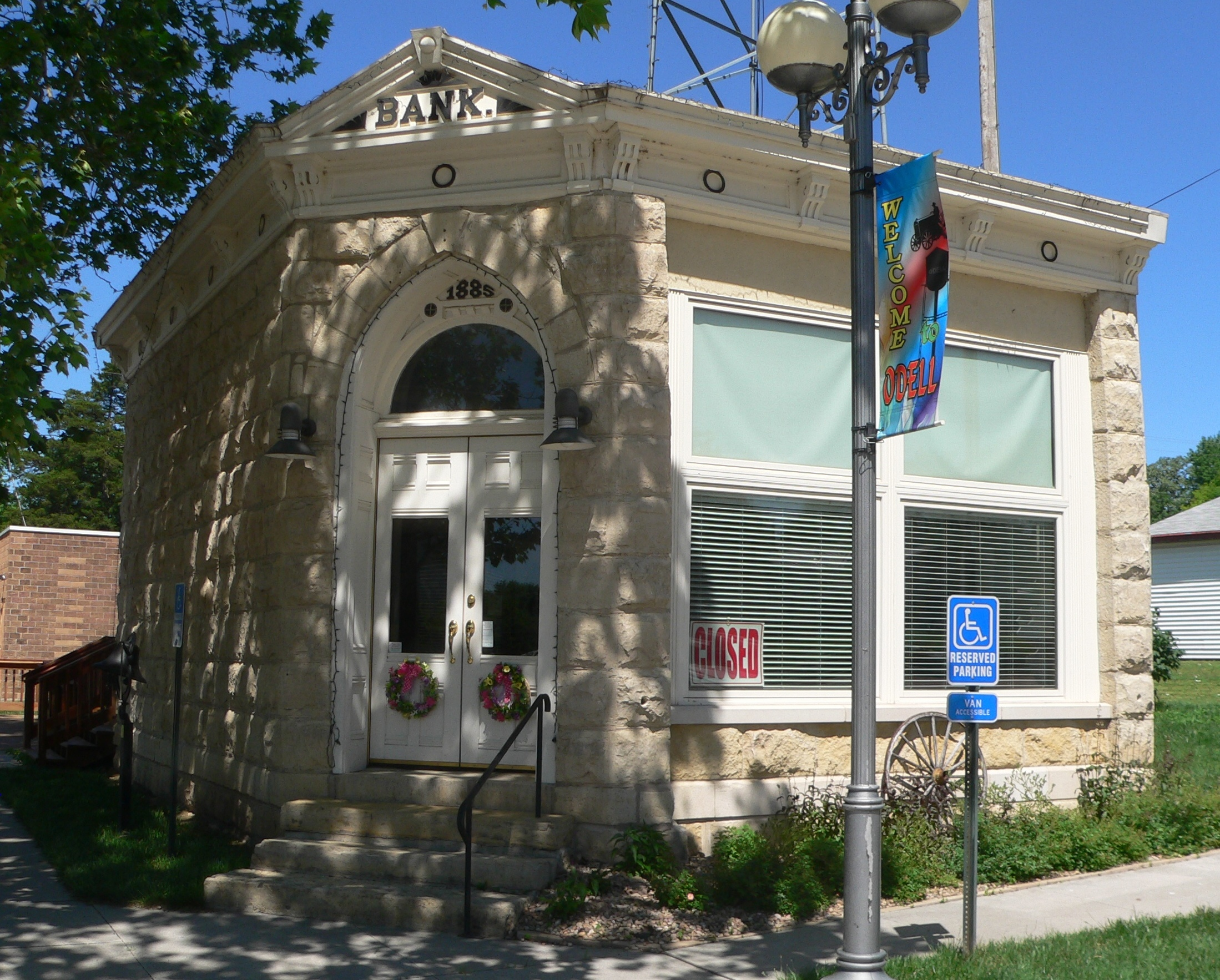
- Building in 2013

- Location within Nebraska Location within the United States
- Location: 301 Main St., Odell, Nebraska
- Coordinates: 40°3′0″N 96°48′6″W
- Area: less than one acre
- NRHP reference No.: 07001190
- Added to NRHP: November 15, 2007

The First Commercial Bank in Odell, Nebraska, also known as Old West Trails Center and located at 301 Main Street, is a historic building that was listed on the National Register of Historic Places in 2007.

The building was built in 1885 of ashlar blocks from local limestone, and has a pressed metal cornice. In 2007, it served as Odell's visitors' center.

It was deemed significant "for activities important to the community's commerce and economy during Odell's earliest period of settlement, growth, and development" and "for its association with James D. Myers, who was instrumental in the founding of the village of Odell."
