= First National Bank (Ottumwa, Iowa) =

- U.S. National Register of Historic Places
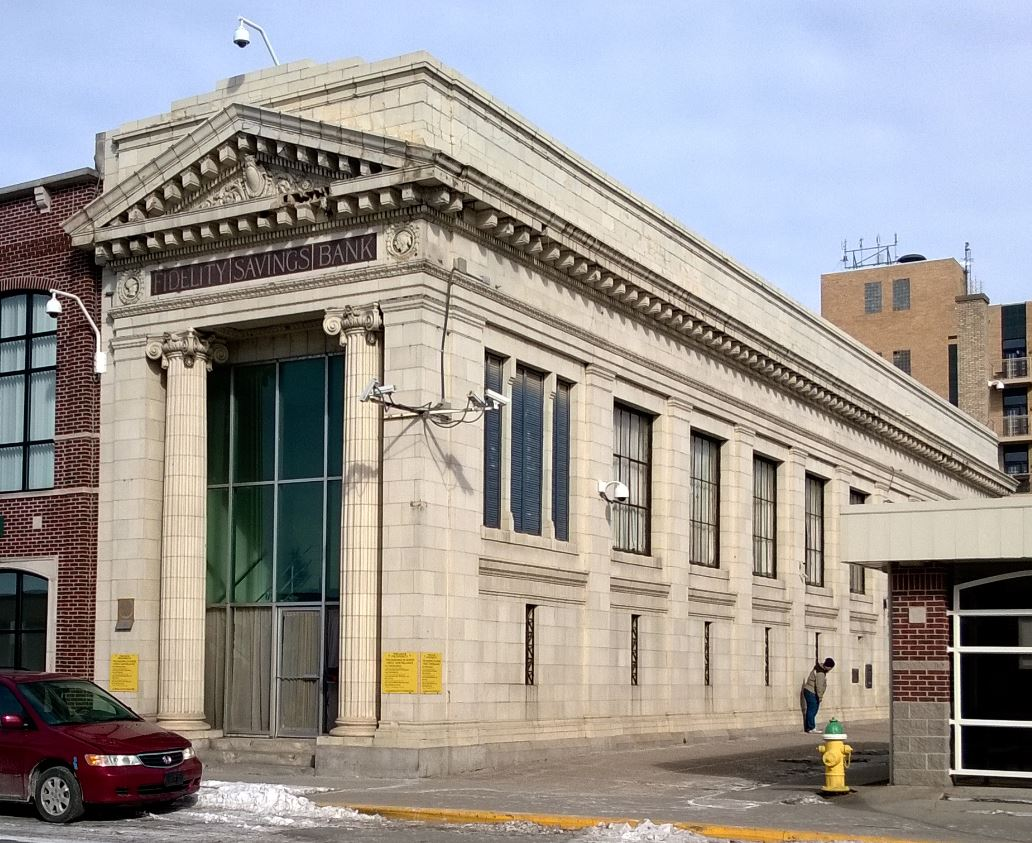

- Location within Iowa Location within the United States
- Location: 131 E. Main St. Ottumwa, Iowa
- Coordinates: 41°1′2″N 92°24′42″W
- Area: less than one acre
- Built: 1915
- Built by: Blackhawk Construction Company
- Architect: H. H. Stoddard
- Architectural style: Classical Revival
- MPS: Ottumwa MPS
- NRHP reference No.: 95000970
- Added to NRHP: August 11, 1995

First National Bank is a historic building located in downtown Ottumwa, Iowa, United States. It is significant for its architectural design and its use of terra cotta for the exterior, the only bank in town so clad. Chicago architect H. H. Stoddard designed the building in the Neoclassical style. It was built by the Blackhawk Construction Company in 1915. The building replaced the original 1868 bank building rebuilt after a fire in 1881, also at this location. The two-story structure features a pediment and two columns flanking the main entrance. The exterior is composed entirely of cream colored terra cotta. Dentil ornamentation is found across the top of the building. Initially, the building was a single story with 25-foot (7.6 m) ceilings, but it was altered to its present form in 1956. The glass wall of the main facade was also added at that time. The building was listed on the National Register of Historic Places in 1995.
