= First National Bank (Mount Pleasant, Iowa) =

- U.S. National Register of Historic Places
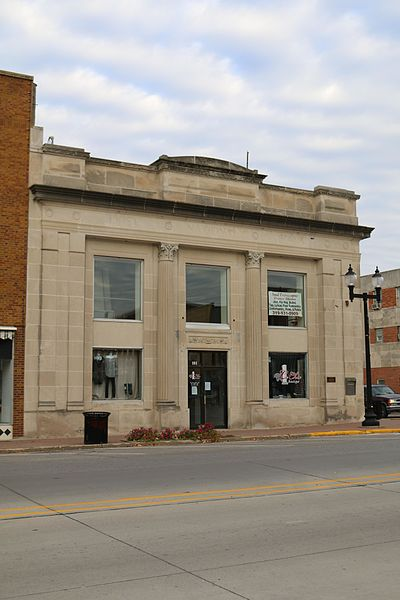

- Location within Iowa Location within the United States
- Location: 101 S. Jefferson St. Mount Pleasant, Iowa
- Coordinates: 40°57′59.6″N 91°33′17.6″W
- Area: less than one acre
- Built: 1923
- Built by: George W. Stiles
- Architect: Paul V. Hyland
- Architectural style: Classical Revival
- MPS: Mount Pleasant MPS
- NRHP reference No.: 91001118
- Added to NRHP: September 6, 1991

First National Bank is a historic building located in Mount Pleasant, Iowa, United States. The bank was first located on this corner in the 1860s. Its first building was a small, brick Italianate structure. This building replaced it in 1923. It is a two-story stone structure designed by Chicago architect Paul V. Hyland in the Neoclassical style. It is unique in Mount Pleasant in that it is the only stone building facing the square, and it reflects more of a public building instead of a commercial building. It is similar in style to the Henry County Courthouse, which is diagonally across the square. The exterior of the primary and secondary facades is composed of ashlar limestone and features paired pilasters on the corners of the primary facade, and a single column in the Corinthian order that flank the main entrance. It is capped with a simple classical cornice and parapet roof. The alley side of the building is composed of red brick. The building was listed on the National Register of Historic Places in 1991.
