= Southeast Banking Corporation =

Bank in the United States of America

- Industry: Banking
- Founded: December 1, 1902; 123 years ago
- Defunct: September 19, 1991; 34 years ago
- Fate: Bank failure; assets acquired by First Union
- Headquarters: Miami, Florida
- Total assets: $10.5 billion

Southeast Banking Corporation was a bank holding company based in Miami, Florida. On Friday, September 19, 1991, during the savings and loan crisis, Southeast failed and was seized by the Office of the Comptroller of the Currency. It was placed into the receivership of the Federal Deposit Insurance Corporation (FDIC), who sold almost all of Southeast's assets to First Union. The bank failure is notable since it is one of the first instances of the FDIC liquidating a bank using loss sharing provisions. As a result of several mergers over the next two decades, most of what was once Southeast is now part of Wells Fargo.

== History ==
Southeast was founded as the First National Bank of Miami on December 1, 1902. It was one of only two banks in Miami to survive the Great Depression. By 1946, it was the largest bank in Florida.

In 1969, the bank changed its name to Southeast Bank. At that time, the bank was led by Charles Zwick, former director of the Office of Management and Budget during the Presidency of Lyndon B. Johnson. In 1983, it opened a signature 765-foot, 55-story tower in downtown Miami, the Southeast Financial Center.

In 1986, the bank was the 30th largest mortgage banker in the United States.

In December 1988, the company acquired First Federal Savings and Loan Association of Jacksonville, an acquisition that turned out to be unprofitable.

By 1990, Southeast was rapidly losing market share. It not only had fewer branches than longtime intrastate rivals Barnett Banks of Jacksonville and SunBanks of Orlando, but had also been passed by a newcomer from Charlotte, North Carolina; First Union. In a state driven by consumer banking and small businesses, Southeast was seen as relying too much on large companies.

Amid concerns about its real estate lending and credit administration practices, Southeast entered into a consent decree with the OCC in 1990–91. However, the losses continued to mount. In the first two quarters of 1991, Southeast lost over $255 million, prompting depositors to pull their funds in droves. The bank was unable to obtain private funding to meet its cash needs, and depended on a $568 million loan from the Federal Reserve Bank of Atlanta to stay afloat.

It soon became apparent that Southeast could not stay independent. However, the bank was unable to put together a viable plan for "open bank assistance," which allows regulators to rescue an ailing bank without seizing it. On September 19, the Atlanta Fed called its loan. Southeast was unable to pay. The OCC, having determined that Southeast was no longer viable, seized both of Southeast's banking subsidiaries, Southeast Bank N.A. and Southeast Bank of West Florida, and placed them into the receivership of the FDIC. The FDIC then sold almost all of Southeast's assets to First Union.

The holding company, Southeast Banking Corporation, filed for Chapter 7 bankruptcy protection the following day. In 2017, the bankruptcy case was finally closed.
