= National Register of Historic Places listings in Muscatine County, Iowa =

Location of Muscatine County in Iowa

Muscatine County, Iowa, United States, has 40 properties and districts listed on the National Register of Historic Places. Another property was once listed but has been removed.

Latitude and longitude coordinates are provided for many National Register properties and districts; these locations may be seen together in a map.

This National Park Service list is complete through NPS recent listings posted August 7, 2026.

== Current listings ==
	Name on the Register	Image	Date listed	Location	City or town	Description
1	Beers and St. John Company Coach Inn	Beers and St. John Company Coach Inn	April 5, 2016 (#16000130)	1193 US 6; 41°35′08″N 91°19′45″W	West Liberty	
2	Big Slough Creek Bridge	Big Slough Creek Bridge	May 15, 1998 (#98000492)	Bancroft Ave. over Big Slough Creek; 41°28′38″N 91°20′53″W	Nichols	
3	Bridge near West Liberty	Bridge near West Liberty	May 15, 1998 (#98000491)	120th St. over an unnamed stream 41°34′06″N 91°19′24″W	West Liberty	
4	Chicago, Rock Island and Pacific Railroad Passenger Depot	Chicago, Rock Island and Pacific Railroad Passenger Depot	August 9, 2022 (#100008032)	405 North Elm St. 41°34′17″N 91°16′04″W	West Liberty	
5	Chicago, Rock Island and Pacific Railroad-Wilton Depot	Chicago, Rock Island and Pacific Railroad-Wilton Depot	August 25, 1988 (#88001326)	N. Railroad St. 41°35′16″N 91°00′58″W	Wilton	
6	Alexander Clark House	Alexander Clark House	October 14, 1976 (#76000796)	203 W. 3rd St. 41°25′17″N 91°02′53″W	Muscatine	
7	Clark-Blackwell House	Clark-Blackwell House	January 27, 1983 (#83000396)	206 Cherry St. 41°25′01″N 91°03′12″W	Muscatine	
8	Downtown Commercial Historic District	Downtown Commercial Historic District	May 24, 2006 (#06000423)	Roughly nine blocks centered on 2nd St. between Pine and Mulberry; 41°25′24″N 91°02′44″W	Muscatine	
9	Fair Oaks Historic District	Fair Oaks Historic District	February 24, 2020 (#100004983)	Bounded by Park Ave., Washington St., Weed Park, and northern Fair Oaks Addition line 41°26′14″N 91°01′39″W	Muscatine	
10	Fairport Biological Station Historic District	Fairport Biological Station Historic District	October 30, 2023 (#100009488)	3390 Highway 22; 41°26′20″N 90°53′49″W	Fairport vicinity	
11	Pliny and Adelia Fay House	Pliny and Adelia Fay House	April 23, 1998 (#98000382)	112 Locust St. 41°25′04″N 91°03′03″W	Muscatine	
12	First Presbyterian Church	First Presbyterian Church	September 14, 1977 (#77000544)	401 Iowa Ave. 41°25′22″N 91°02′51″W	Muscatine	
13	W. Joseph Fuller House	W. Joseph Fuller House	December 10, 1982 (#82000416)	1001 Mulberry Ave. 41°25′49″N 91°02′51″W	Muscatine	
14	Greenwood Cemetery Chapel	Greenwood Cemetery Chapel	September 21, 2001 (#01001013)	1814 Lucas; 41°25′12″N 91°03′50″W	Muscatine	
15	Ijem Avenue Commercial Historic District	Ijem Avenue Commercial Historic District	September 18, 2020 (#100005566)	Ijem Ave. between Railroad St. and Main St. 41°28′52″N 91°18′30″W	Nichols	
16	Doctor Alexander R. (A.R.) and Louisa J. Leith House	Doctor Alexander R. (A.R.) and Louisa J. Leith House	October 2, 2020 (#100005657)	117 West 6th St. 41°35′28″N 91°01′04″W	Wilton	
17	Lock and Dam No. 16 Historic District	Lock and Dam No. 16 Historic District	March 10, 2004 (#04000176)	33109 102nd Ave., W. 41°25′46″N 91°00′42″W	Muscatine	
18	Laura Musser McColm Historic District	Laura Musser McColm Historic District	January 24, 2017 (#100000562)	1314 Mulberry Ave. 41°25′57″N 91°03′05″W	Muscatine	
19	McKee Button Company	McKee Button Company	November 16, 2020 (#100005784)	1000 Hershey Ave. 41°24′53″N 91°03′19″W	Muscatine	
20	S. M. McKibben House	S. M. McKibben House	August 27, 1974 (#74000800)	Walnut St. between Front and 2nd 41°25′21″N 91°02′32″W	Muscatine	Now houses the local chamber of commerce
21	Muscatine County Courthouse	Muscatine County Courthouse	July 2, 1981 (#81000260)	3rd St. 41°25′28″N 91°02′35″W	Muscatine	
22	Muscatine County Home Dairy Barn	Muscatine County Home Dairy Barn	January 31, 2019 (#100003365)	3210 Harmony Ln. 41°26′02″N 91°05′06″W	Muscatine	
23	Benjamin F. and Susan M. (Jenkins) Nichols House	Benjamin F. and Susan M. (Jenkins) Nichols House	October 25, 2023 (#100009487)	815 Ijem Avenue; 41°28′52″N 91°18′05″W	Nichols	
24	Samuel Nichols House	Samuel Nichols House	March 31, 1978 (#78001247)	East of Nichols off Iowa Highway 22; 41°28′43″N 91°16′58″W	Nichols	
25	Henry E. and Ella M. (Knott) Nicolaus House	Henry E. and Ella M. (Knott) Nicolaus House	May 8, 2017 (#100000968)	319 4th St. W. 41°35′21″N 91°01′15″W	Wilton	
26	Old Jail	Old Jail	July 24, 1974 (#74000801)	411 E. 4th St. 41°25′49″N 91°02′37″W	Muscatine	
27	Pine Creek Gristmill	Pine Creek Gristmill	December 10, 1979 (#79000919)	Northeast of Muscatine in Wildcat Den State Park; 41°28′03″N 90°52′03″W	Muscatine	
28	Pine Mill Bridge	Pine Mill Bridge	May 15, 1998 (#98000493)	Over Pine Creek in Wildcat Den State Park; 41°28′03″N 90°52′02″W	Muscatine	
29	Pine Mills German Methodist Episcopal Church	Pine Mills German Methodist Episcopal Church	October 17, 2003 (#03001051)	180th St. and Verde Ave. 41°28′50″N 90°52′51″W	Muscatine	
30	St. Mary's Roman Catholic Church	St. Mary's Roman Catholic Church	September 19, 2022 (#100008198)	314 Grand Ave. 41°28′41″N 91°18′32″W	Nichols	
31	Sinnett Octagon House	Sinnett Octagon House	July 18, 1974 (#74000802)	North of Muscatine near Iowa Highway 38; 41°27′11″N 91°01′50″W	Muscatine	
32	Trinity Episcopal Church	Trinity Episcopal Church	October 29, 1974 (#74000803)	411 E. 2nd St. 41°25′25″N 91°02′31″W	Muscatine	
33	George H. and Loretta Ward House	George H. and Loretta Ward House	May 2, 1997 (#97000388)	719 N. Calhoun St. 41°34′31″N 91°15′49″W	West Liberty	
34	J. C. B. Warde House	J. C. B. Warde House	April 26, 1979 (#79000920)	205 Cherry St. 41°25′02″N 91°03′09″W	Muscatine	
35	Welch Apartments	Welch Apartments	January 15, 1979 (#79000921)	224 Iowa Ave. 41°25′18″N 91°02′47″W	Muscatine	
36	West Hill Historic District	West Hill Historic District	April 30, 2008 (#08000356)	Roughly bounded by W. 2nd St. from Pine to Ash, W. 3rd St., and W. 4th St. from Chestnut to near Ash. 41°25′10″N 91°03′03″W	Muscatine	
37	West Liberty Commercial Historic District	West Liberty Commercial Historic District	September 12, 2002 (#02001035)	Bounded by 4th St., railroad tracks, and Clay and Spencer Sts. 40°34′16″N 91°15′48″W	West Liberty	
38	West Liberty Fairgrounds Historic District	West Liberty Fairgrounds Historic District	December 22, 2015 (#15000916)	101 N. Clay St. 41°34′03″N 91°15′56″W	West Liberty	
39	Wilton Candy Kitchen	Wilton Candy Kitchen	January 7, 1993 (#92001742)	310 Cedar St. 41°35′16″N 91°01′06″W	Wilton	
40	Wilton Commercial Historic District	Wilton Commercial Historic District	September 12, 2016 (#16000606)	Roughly bounded by 4th, E. & W. Cedar, Railroad E. & W. & Chestnut Sts. 41°35′19″N 91°01′01″W	Wilton	

== Former listings ==
	Name on the Register	Image	Date listed	Date removed	Location	City or town	Description
1	Bowman Livery Stable		June 28, 1974 (#74000799)	May 22, 2003	219 E. Mississippi Drive	Muscatine	Demolished in 1975
2	Ogilvie-Asthalter Building		May 26, 1977 (#77001565)	December 15, 1977	221-223 Iowa Avenue	Muscatine	

== See also ==
- List of National Historic Landmarks in Iowa
- National Register of Historic Places listings in Iowa
- Listings in neighboring counties: Cedar, Johnson, Louisa, Rock Island (IL), Scott
