= Big Slough =

Big Slough may refer to:

- Big Slough, Alberta
- Big Slough Creek Bridge, Iowa
- Big Slough (Kingsbury County, South Dakota)
- Big Slough Reserve, near T. Mabry Carlton Reserve in Florida
- Big Slough Wilderness, Texas

== See also ==
- Slough (disambiguation)
