= Muscatine County Fairgrounds =

- West Liberty Fairgrounds; Historic District
- U.S. National Register of Historic Places
- U.S. Historic district
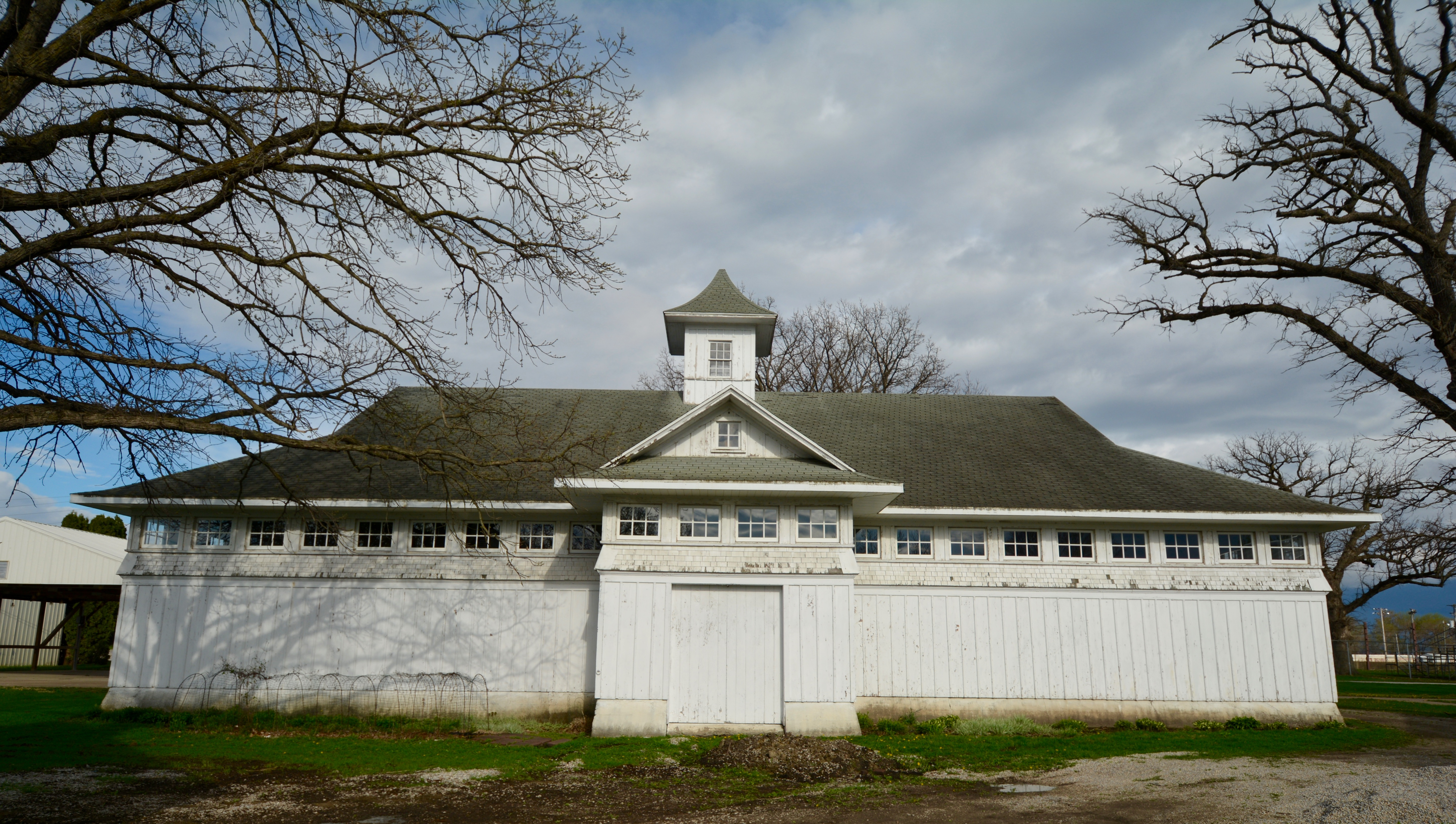
- Exhibition Hall (1915)

- Location within Iowa Location within the United States
- Location: 101 N. Clay St. West Liberty, Iowa
- Coordinates: 41°34′03″N 91°15′56″W
- Area: 45 acres (18 ha)
- NRHP reference No.: 15000916
- Added to NRHP: December 22, 2015

The Muscatine County Fairgrounds are located in West Liberty, Iowa, United States. It hosts the annual Muscatine County Fair. The Muscatine County Historic Preservation Commission received a grant from the State of Iowa to study the fairgrounds in 2014. Most of it was listed as a historic district on the National Register of Historic Places as the West Liberty Fairgrounds Historic District in 2015. At the time of its nomination it consisted of 42 resources, which included 16 contributing buildings, two contributing sites, two contributing structures, 16 non-contributing buildings, and six non-contributing structures. Historic tax credits will be used to rehabilitate the historic buildings on the fairgrounds.

== History ==
The Union District Agricultural Society began holding fairs in southwest Cedar County in 1863, and transferred them to West Liberty in 1871. The West Liberty Park Association was established three years later and bought the first 31 acres (13 ha) for the society in 1875. Additional land, which makes up the historic district, was purchased in 1889 and 1963. The initial wood-frame buildings were replaced by some of the present buildings beginning in 1915 with the Exhibition Hall. County fairs in rural areas were a showcase of livestock, agricultural products, home economics, and craftwork. Youth participation began to increase in the 1910s, the result of practical rural education. Structures geared to their activities were built beginning in the 1930s. As demand grew at about the same time for spectator space along the race track, a new grandstand was built in 1928. Because the size of the exhibitions grew in the mid-20th century, new and larger exhibition space was added in the 1960s, which included a new livestock judging pavilion in 1966.

The race track initially sponsored horse racing throughout the summer months. The stalls and track were used for rental and training purposes. They were eventually replaced by auto races. In addition to the races and the fair, various other events are held at the fairgrounds. They include family reunions, picnics, holiday celebrations, and other community events.

== See also ==
- National Register of Historic Places listings in Muscatine County, Iowa
