= Liberty Historic District =

Liberty Historic District or Liberty Downtown Historic District may refer to:

- Liberty Downtown Historic District (Liberty, Kentucky)
  - New Liberty Historic District, New Liberty, Kentucky
- Liberty Downtown Historic District (Liberty, New York), NRHP-listed
- Liberty Historic District (Liberty, North Carolina)
- Liberty Historic District (Liberty, Tennessee), NRHP-listed
- Liberty Historic District (Liberty, Washington), listed on the NRHP in Kittitas County, Washington

== See also ==
- Liberty Street Historic District (disambiguation)
- Penn-Liberty Historic District, Pittsburgh, Pennsylvania
- West Liberty Commercial Historic District, West Liberty, Iowa
- West Liberty Courthouse Square Historic District, Liberty, Missouri
