= West Liberty station =

Historic train station

West Liberty
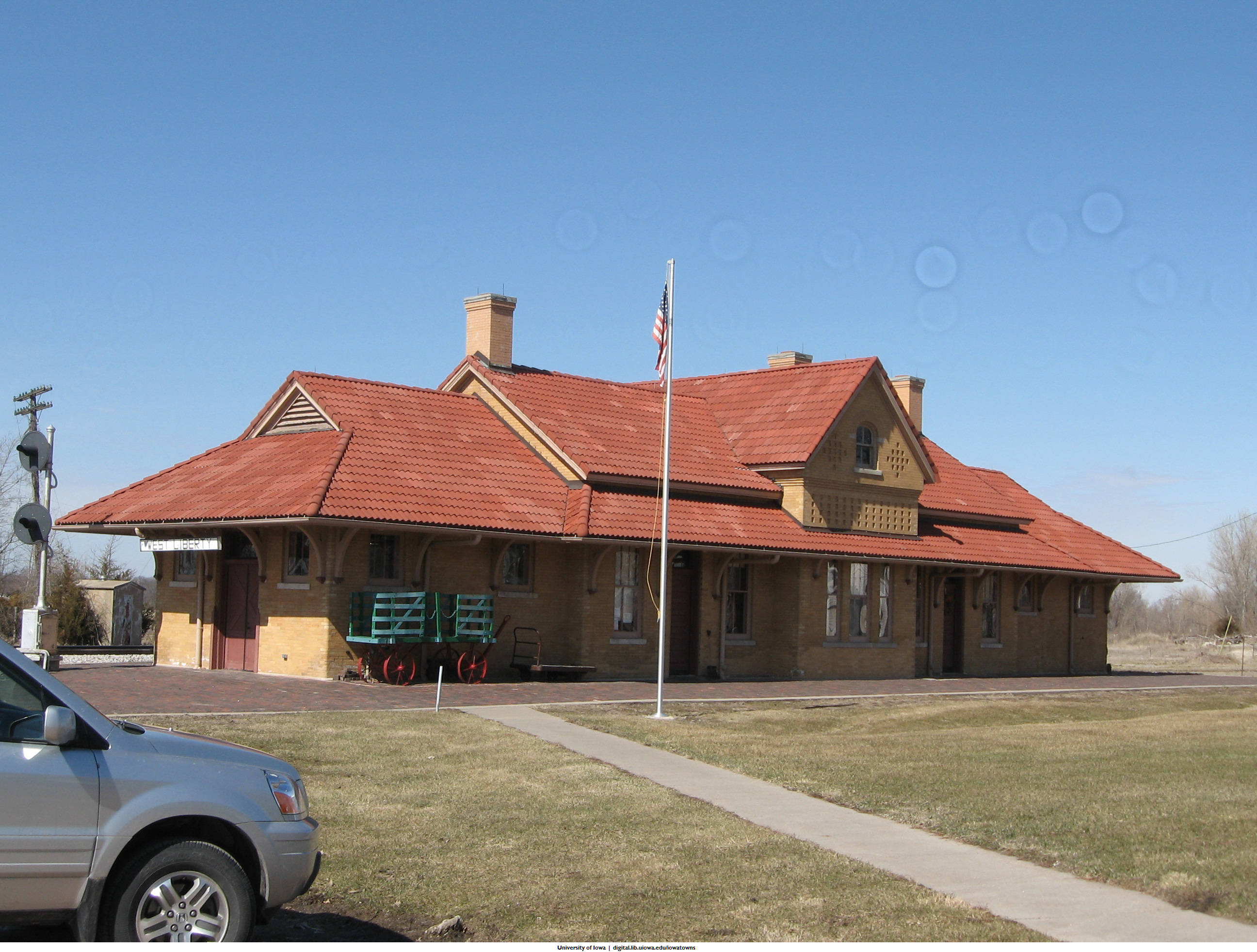
- The station building in 2008

General information
- Location: 405 North Elm St. West Liberty, Iowa
- System: Former Rock Island Line passenger rail station

History
- Opened: c. 1860
- Closed: May 1970
- Rebuilt: 1897

Services
Preceding station	Chicago, Rock Island and Pacific Railroad	Following station
Iowa City toward Colorado Springs	Main Line	Wilton toward Chicago
Centerdale toward Minneapolis	Burlington, Cedar Rapids and Northern Railway	Nichols toward Burlington
- Chicago, Rock Island and Pacific Railroad Passenger Depot
- U.S. National Register of Historic Places
- Location within Iowa Location within the United States
- Location: 405 North Elm St. West Liberty, Iowa
- Coordinates: 41°34′17″N 91°16′04″W
- NRHP reference No.: 100008032
- Added to NRHP: August 9, 2022
Location

West Liberty station is an historic train station located in West Liberty, Iowa, United States.

== History ==
The Minnesota and Missouri Railroad laid tracks through the area in 1855, bypassing the small settlement of Wapsinonoc. Settlers relocated nearer to the new railroad and the depot at West Liberty was established. The Burlington, Cedar Rapids and Minnesota Railway was built through the town in 1870. Being used for both railroads, the shared depot was commonly called Union station. The modern station building was built in 1897 after the previous depot was destroyed in a fire. In 1910, 35 daily passenger trains stopped at West Liberty.

Passenger service ceased in May 1970, though the Rock Island continued to utilize the site as field offices. By 1981, the station building had been boarded up as derelict. It was rededicated after restoration in 2001, being converted to a museum. It was added to the National Register of Historic Places on August 9, 2022.
