= Bridge near West Liberty =

- U.S. National Register of Historic Places
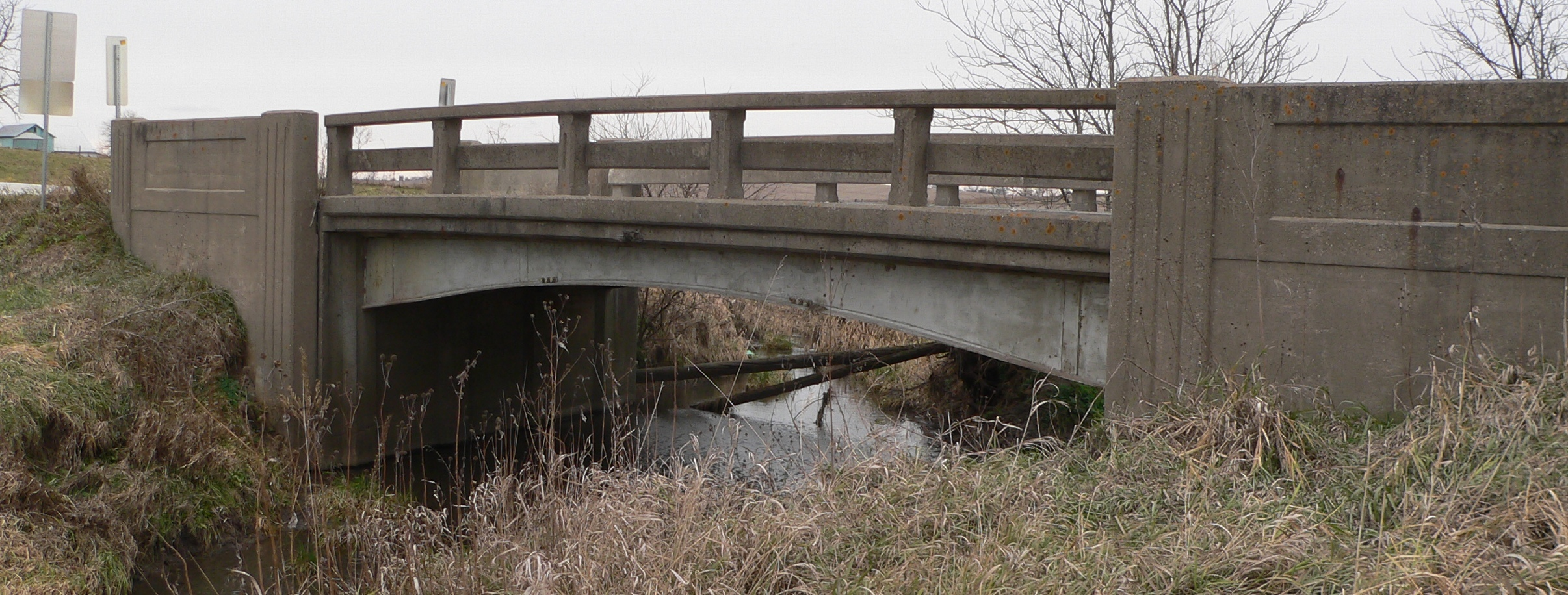

- Location within Iowa Location within the United States
- Location: 120th St. over an unnamed stream near West Liberty, Iowa
- Coordinates: 41°34′6″N 91°19′24″W
- Built: 1937
- Architect: Otto Wendling
- Demolished: 2020
- MPS: Highway Bridges of Iowa MPS
- NRHP reference No.: 98000491
- Added to NRHP: May 15, 1998

The Bridge near West Liberty is an historic structure located west of the town of West Liberty in rural Muscatine County, Iowa, United States. The welded steel rigid frame bridge was built in 1937. It was designed by Otto Wendling of the Iowa State Highway Commission. The bridge was listed on the National Register of Historic Places in 1998 as a part of the Highway Bridges of Iowa MPS. The bridge was demolished and replaced by a culvert in 2020.
