= George H. and Loretta Ward House =

Historic house in Iowa, United States

- U.S. National Register of Historic Places
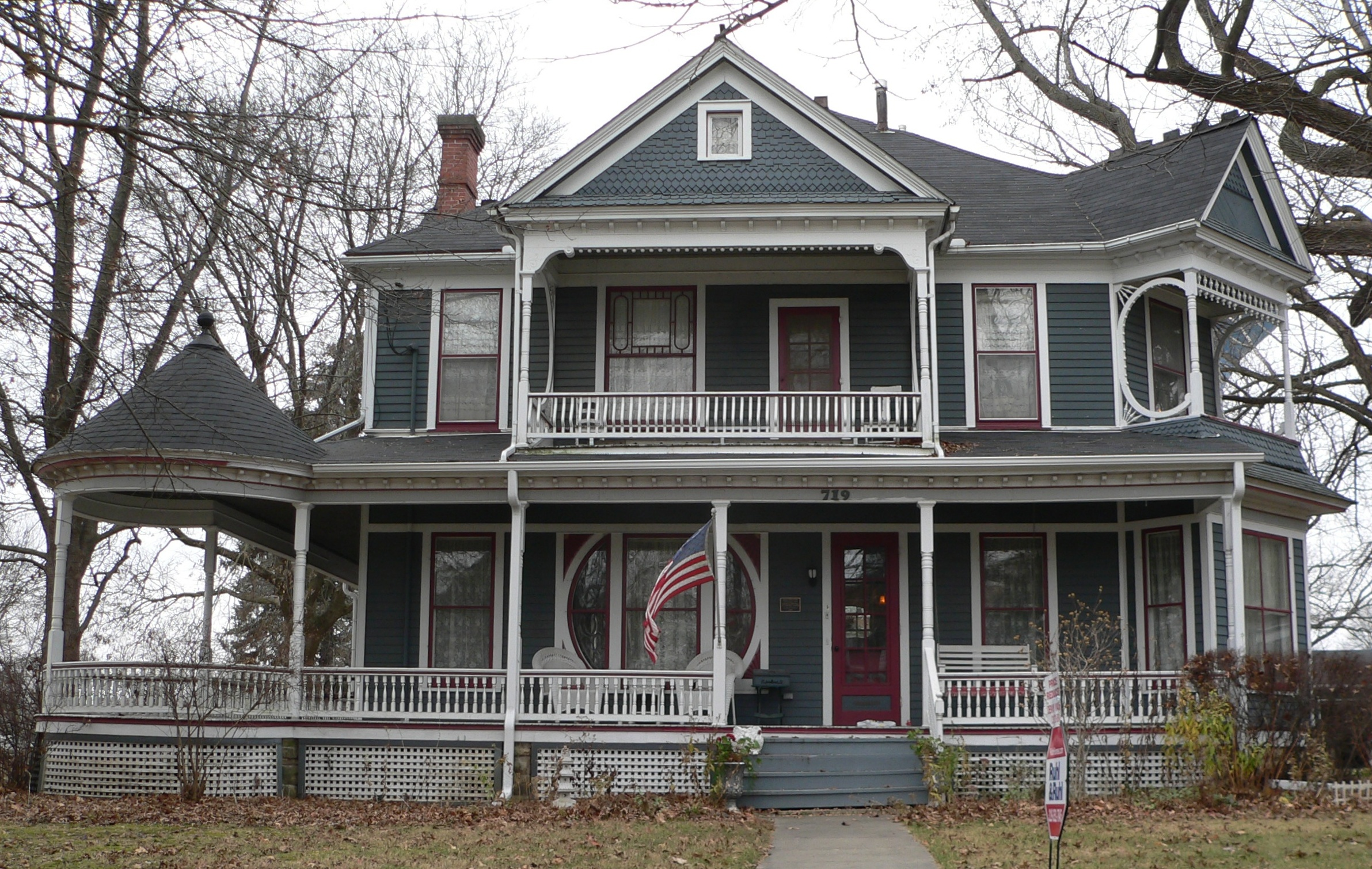

- Location within Iowa Location within the United States
- Location: 719 N. Calhoun St. West Liberty, Iowa
- Coordinates: 41°34′31″N 91°15′49″W
- Area: less than one acre
- Built: 1896
- Built by: Will A. Warren
- Architectural style: Queen Anne
- NRHP reference No.: 97000388
- Added to NRHP: May 2, 1997

George H. and Loretta Ward House, also known as the Cline House, is a historic residence located in West Liberty, Iowa, United States. It has been listed on the National Register of Historic Places since 1997.

== History ==
George Ward was a native of Pittsburgh, Pennsylvania and Loretta was from the West Liberty-West Branch, Iowa area. They originally settled on a farm near Centerdale, Iowa before moving to West Liberty in 1890. Local contractor Will A. Warren built this house in 1896. The Wards owned one of the first automobiles in town and hired Frank Pertlick as a chauffeur and gardener. George died in 1905 and Loretta in 1919. The house and property was bequeathed to Pertlick, but it was tied up in probate for years. His lawyer, J.E. McIntosh, took the property as payment.

== Architecture ==
The Ward House is a 2½ story, frame structure executed in the Queen Anne style. The main block measures 39 by 36 feet (12 by 11 m) and the summer kitchen adds another 14 by 15 feet (4.3 by 4.6 m). The primary decorative feature on the exterior is a wrap-around porch. It is highlighted by a corner turret capped with a finial, and it is enclosed with a balustrade. The asymmetrical facade has a second story porch above the main floor porch with a distinctive balustrade. The main block of the house is capped with a hip roof. The cross gables feature metal crests along the top. A barn on the property that housed the carriage and horses was replaced by a smaller garage at some point.
