= Beers and St. John Company Coach Inn =

- Beers and St. John Company; Coach Inn
- U.S. National Register of Historic Places
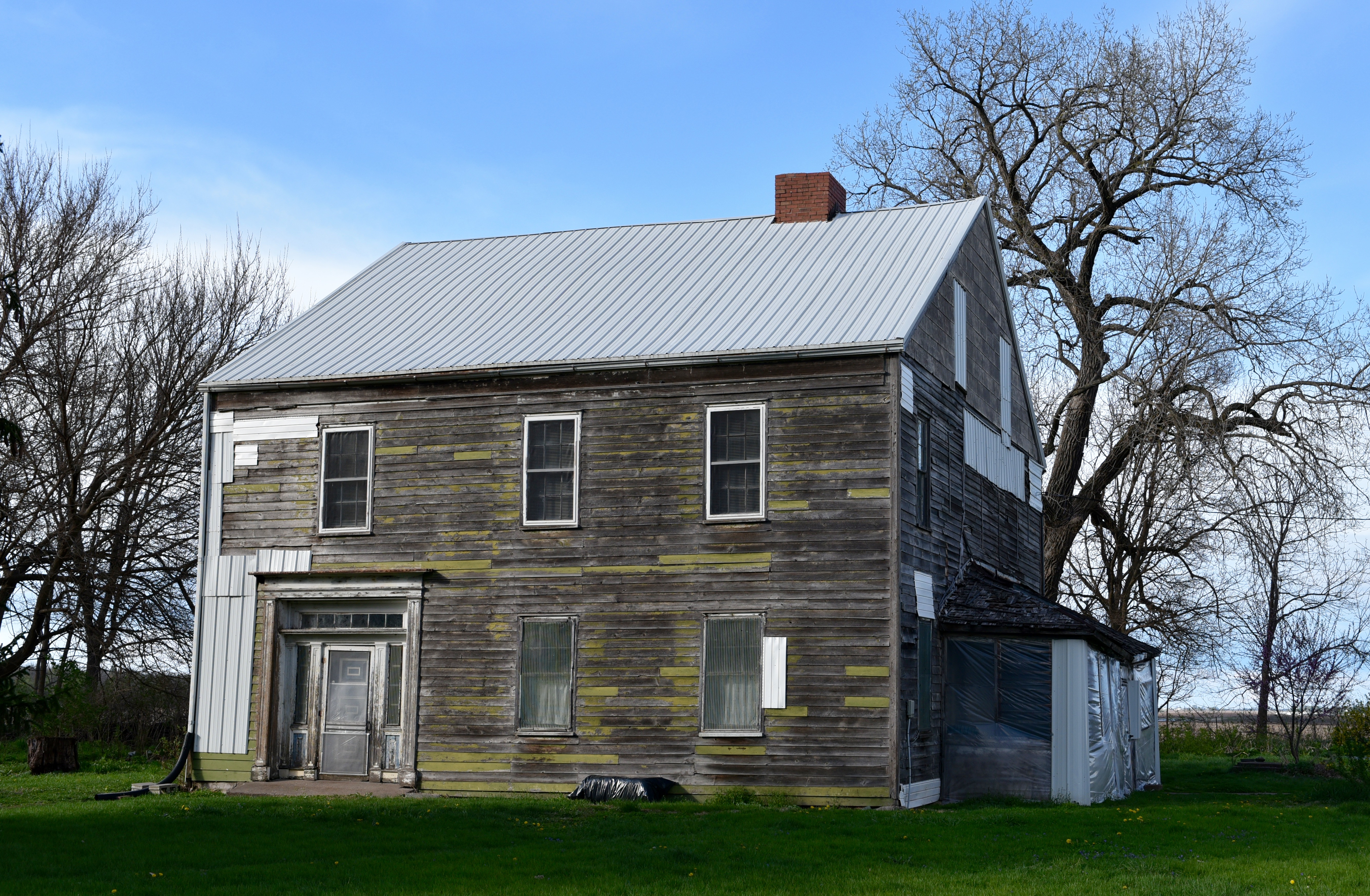

- Location within Iowa Location within the United States
- Location: 1193 Highway 6
- Nearest city: West Liberty, Iowa
- Coordinates: 41°35′11″N 91°19′44″W
- NRHP reference No.: 16000130
- Added to NRHP: April 5, 2016

The Beers and St. John Company Coach Inn is a historic building located west of West Liberty, Iowa, United States. The company was granted the U.S. Mail delivery contract between Iowa City and Muscatine in 1839 and began service in 1841. Beers and St. John and Egbert T. Smith built this two-story frame structure the following year. At the time, Iowa was still a territory and Iowa City was the capital. It was a swing station where horses and drivers were switched, and it was a crossroads where the Muscatine-Iowa City route crossed with the Davenport-Iowa City route. Smith's wife died in 1854 and is buried on the property, as is a family who died while staying here. The inn closed in 1855 with the arrival of the railroad, and the building was converted into a house.

The basic design of the structure was a copy of Smith's previous home on Long Island, New York. The siding, windows, doors and interior millwork were constructed in Cincinnati and shipped by steamboat to Iowa. At one time it had an octagonal glass cupola on the roof where they hung a lantern at night so the stagecoach drivers could find the inn. A foyer, a large gathering room and two dining rooms were located on the first floor. The kitchen was in a separate building, and no longer exists. The second floor features four large bedrooms and a smaller room that was used by the stagecoach drivers. The building was listed on the National Register of Historic Places in 2016.
