= West Liberty Foods =

American meat processing company

West Liberty Foods, L.L.C.
- Company type: Private company
- Industry: Meat Processing
- Founded: 1996 in West Liberty, Iowa
- Headquarters: West Liberty, Iowa
- Key people: Brandon Achen, President and CEO
- Products: Turkey, Sliced Meats; Other meat products
- Number of employees: 1900 (2008)
- Website: www.wlfoods.com

West Liberty Foods, L.L.C. is a farmer-owned food company headquartered in West Liberty, Iowa. Recognized as one of the top-50 protein processors in North America, the company has the capacity to produce over 650 million pounds of food products per year across four facilities. According to the National Provisioner, West Liberty Foods is the 34th-largest meat and poultry processor in the United States.

West Liberty Foods meat and poultry products can be found in grocery stores and restaurant chains nationwide, and has four locations: West Liberty, Iowa; Mount Pleasant, Iowa; Tremonton, Utah; and Bolingbrook, Illinois.

== Information ==
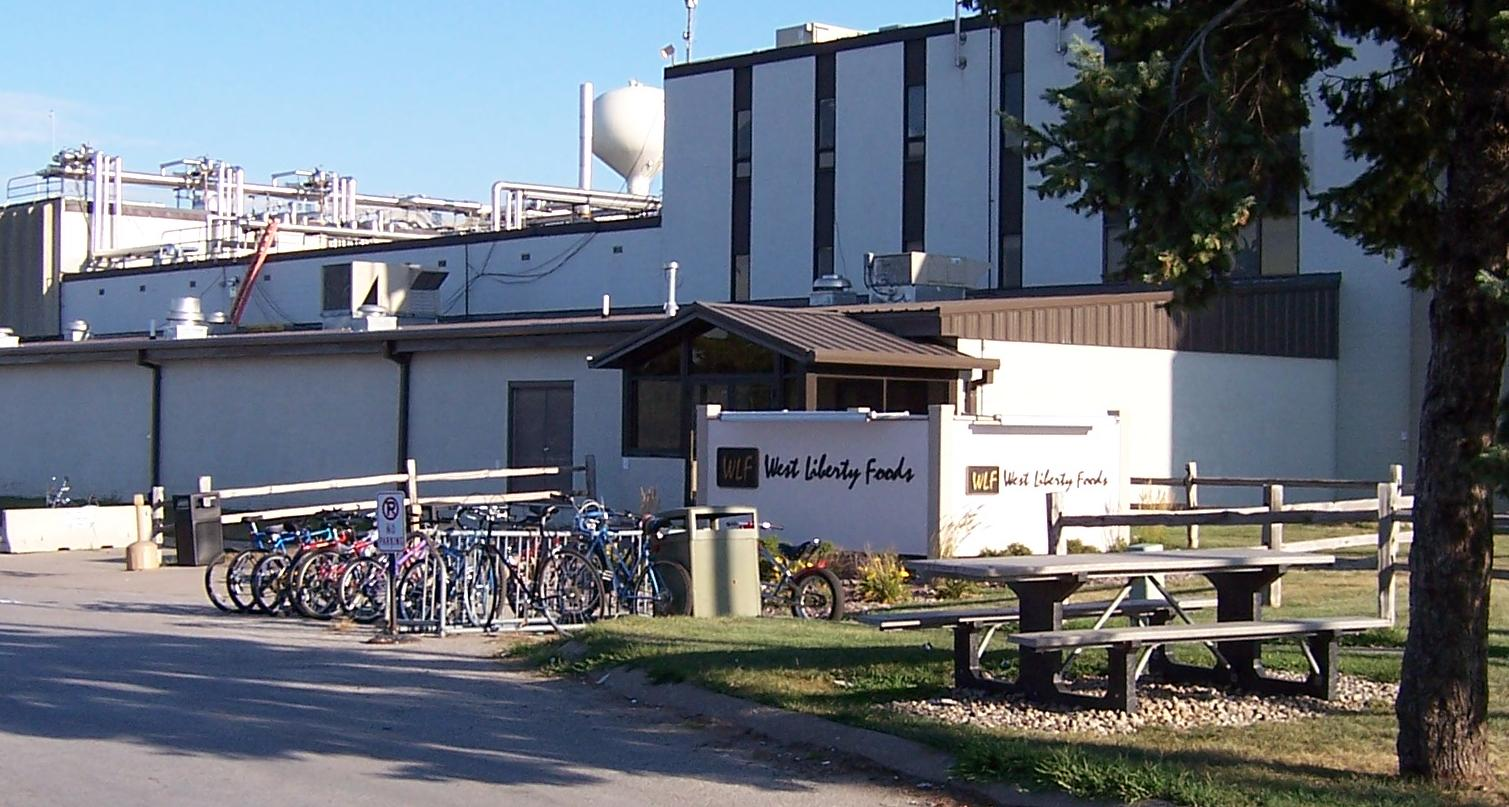
Main entrance to the company's plant in West Liberty

The company primarily provides meat for other marketing brands, producing 90% of its product for customers, while selling only 10% under the West Liberty Foods brand name. In addition to slaughtering turkeys, the company produces prepared beef, chicken, pork, and turkey products. Company revenue has grown rapidly with US$65 million in sales during 1997, $120 million in 2000, and $200 million in 2003. Most recently, West Liberty Foods posted $442 million in revenue for 2006, making the company the 56th-largest meat-packing company by sales in the United States. Much of the company's sales come from large nationwide foodservice customers, and as of 2006, was Subway's largest supplier of sliced sandwich meat, providing the franchise with more than 1 million pounds per week. As a result of serving national customers, the company is inspected more than other food manufacturers. Three of West Liberty Foods' plants have been ISO 14001 certified for meeting environmental management standards, and the West Liberty plant was the first turkey-processing plant in the United States to receive this certification.

West Liberty Foods maintains separate facilities for research and development (R&D) and laboratory testing services. They are housed in adjacent buildings several blocks from the plant in West Liberty. The R&D facility includes testing space for both raw and cooked product, and can create test products from start to finish, including initial formulation, final slicing, and packaging. The laboratory conducts product quality testing for the production facilities and uses polymerase chain reaction technology for rapid bacteriological testing. This system can return results within 30 hours of production.

== History ==
Prior to 1996, Louis Rich, the brand name for Oscar Mayer's turkey division, owned the processing plant in West Liberty. In early 1996, Oscar Mayer's parent company, Kraft Foods, announced that they would close the plant that December if no buyer purchased it. The Iowa turkey growers who sold to Kraft discussed purchasing the plant to ensure that demand for their birds remained. In May 1996, 47 of the turkey growers formed the Iowa Turkey Growers Cooperative (ITGC), which purchased the plant from Kraft and took control of it in December. The growers hired meat industry veteran Ken Rutledge to be president and COO of the company. Oscar Mayer helped West Liberty Foods by promising to purchase half of the plant's output in 1997 and a quarter of the output in 1998 to help the startup company.

Production under ITGC ownership began in January 1997. The company faced financial difficulty because the turkey market was oversupplied and prices hit historic lows. While financial projections assumed a price of US$1.92 per pound for turkey, prices averaged $1.46 per pound in 1997. During this time, four of the growers left ITGC. Turkey prices eventually rebounded, and the company was bolstered by sales to Sara Lee near the end of 1998.

Since the rebound, West Liberty Foods’ sales have grown steadily. In 2000, the company acquired a second plant in Sigourney, Iowa, from Pinnacle Foods to meet rising orders. The facility was sold in 2012. The company grew again in April 2003, when it opened a processing plant in Mount Pleasant, Iowa, which was later expanded in 2004. Company leadership changed in 2004, as Ed Garrett was named president and COO when Rutledge resigned to take a position with another growers' organization. In 2006, the company entered into a marketing alliance agreement with Midvale, Utah-based Norbest Foods.

On April 9, 2020, three workers were infected with COVID-19 at the company's plant in West Liberty, resulting in a shutdown until April 14 due to sanitization being done.

== Labor episode ==
In 2004, workers at the West Liberty plant considered joining the United Food and Commercial Workers (UFCW). On July 1, 2004, the workers voted on whether they would be represented by UFCW Local 431. An initial tally of votes came out 301 in favor and 299 against union representation, but the count did not include 13 ballots that were disputed by UFCW. The ballots were challenged on claims that they were cast by management personnel who would not be union members.

A National Labor Relations Board hearing to confirm or invalidate the vote was scheduled for January 5, 2005, but then postponed until February 16, 2005. On February 1, 2005, the company and UFCW settled their dispute. UFCW withdrew its objections, and West Liberty Foods posted a notice that they would not close the plant or fire workers if employees unionized. This resulted in a final vote count of 303 to 308 against union representation.

UFCW Local 431 held a second vote at the West Liberty plant on July 15, 2005. The vote was 231 to 322 against unionization.

In 2009, the company paid US$58,613.75 to Labor Information Services, an antiunion management services company connected to the Burke Group, to provide consultants who met directly with workers "either individually or in group meetings...regarding union issues."

== Processing plants ==
=== West Liberty plant ===
The West Liberty plant is a 270,000-square-foot (25,000 m^{2}) facility, which slaughters and further processes turkey products. The slaughter operation converts around 20,000 turkeys per workday.

Louis H. Rich purchased the West Liberty plant, a former tomato-canning facility, in 1943, when he decided to expand the operations of the Rock Island Produce Company, located on 9th Street in Rock Island, Illinois. The plant was converted to a poultry, including chickens and turkeys, slaughter facility in 1946 and refocused by Rich's sons, Norman and Martin, on turkey in 1949. The plant was first expanded in 1960. Oscar Mayer acquired the plant, through its purchase of Louis Rich, Inc., in 1979 and used it for turkey production until selling the plant in 1996.

=== Mount Pleasant plant ===
The Mount Pleasant plant is a 85,000-square-foot (7,900 m^{2}) facility that is used for slicing cooked cheese, turkey, chicken, beef, pork, and other products. The plant employs roughly 500 people working in three shifts. A 68,000-square-foot (6,300 m^{2}) Millard Refrigerated Services facility is located adjacent to the Mount Pleasant plant. The two facilities are connected, and product is immediately transferred by conveyor from the plant to cold storage when packaging is complete.

The design and operation of the Mount Pleasant plant was developed to decrease potential hazards to food safety. WLF representatives have stated that the goal of the Mount Pleasant plant is to create a pathogen-free environment. Because company officials believe that the food safety aspects of the plant are unique in the meat industry, they submitted the plant design for patent approval through the U.S. Patent Office. The Mount Pleasant plant is located about 50 miles (80 km) from either the West Liberty or Sigourney plants. This reduces the likelihood that pathogens would be carried either by air or foot traffic from a raw production area to Mount Pleasant's ready-to-eat production.

The Mount Pleasant facility consists of about 20 individual processing cells that are separated from one another and are set up so that they could operate as individual meat-slicing facilities. Before antimicrobial flooring was poured, the cells were erected with stainless steel antimicrobial walls that are built into the floor. Each processing cell has independent refrigeration and drainage systems. The refrigeration systems filter the cell's air and maintain positive air pressure at 38 °F (3 °C), and the drainage systems are sealed off and flooded with sanitizers nightly.

During operation, fully cooked meat or cheese logs arrive sealed in impermeable casings. The logs go through a casing sanitation step that involves being treated with a sanitizing liquid before the casings are removed from the logs. The logs then undergo a post lethality treatment by passing through an infrared pasteurization tunnel to kill pathogens on the logs. The logs are then mechanically transferred to slicers, sliced, and placed in sealed packages that are transferred out of the processing cell. The mechanical transfers decrease the risk of product contamination by reducing handling of product by personnel.

Food safety is a factor in hiring employees at the Mount Pleasant facility. Before applying, potential employees must complete a 16-hour, food-safety training course through Iowa State University. The class includes written tests, which each applicant must pass before completing the course. On the job, employees must don a sealed clean-room suit before entering slicing cells. The suits are cleaned and sealed in a clean-room laundry facility in North Carolina by uniform company Cintas. Employees replace the clean suit each time they leave the cell, and each employee averages five suits per day.

=== Tremonton, Utah plant ===
As of 2006, West Liberty Foods plans to build a plant in Tremonton, Utah. The plant would not slaughter, but the 200,000-square-foot (19,000 m^{2}) facility allotted 93,000 square feet (8,600 m^{2}) for processing and 74,000 square feet (6,900 m^{2}) for slicing a variety of meat products. The company broke ground for the facility in October 2006. It was expected to begin production in July 2007. When completed, the plant was to be the first in North America to slice 10 ft (3.0 m) slicing logs. The plant will initially have ten slicing cells allowing production of 150 million pounds per year and will eventually add 10 more cells to double the plant's capacity. At full capacity, the plant was to employ more than 500 people. Similar to the Mount Pleasant plant, a 50,000-square-foot (4,600 m^{2}) Millard Refrigerated Services facility was built adjacent to the Tremonton plant for warehouse storage of refrigerated and frozen products.

Initially, the company investigated sites for the new plant in Utah, Nevada, and Arizona. It requested US$5.2 million in tax incentives from Utah to build in Pleasant View, Utah. On April 26, 2006, Utah's Department of Community and Economic Development approved a US$2 million tax-rebate over 10 years. The incentives were conditioned on the new jobs paying a certain level above the county median wage, offering health insurance, and the company staying in Utah for 10 years. Pleasant View offered another US$1.4-US$1.8 million in incentives. However, construction in Pleasant View became impossible when much of the site was found to consist of wetland areas. After this development, the state held the incentive offer open provided that West Liberty Foods could find another suitable site that met Utah's requirements.

On July 29, 2006, the company announced that they would build the new plant in Tremonton, Utah. The tax incentives were to total an 80% property tax break, but Tremonton is projected to experience a US$508,000 financial benefit over 12 years after the plant is completed. Of the 500 jobs at the plant, 300 are expected to pay between $21,500 and $26,875. The rest of the jobs would pay more, with about 100 paying around $37,000.

=== Bolingbrook, Illinois plant ===
West Liberty Foods opened its plant in Bolingbrook, Illinois, plant (purchased from bankruptcy) in 2014. By 2016, the Bolingbrook facility achieved ISO certification, as well as landfill-free status.

== Awards ==
West Liberty Foods has received a number of awards from various organizations.

- 2001 – Subway Supplier of the Year
- 2003 – Paul Hill honored by the National Council of Farmer Cooperatives
- 2005 – Economic Vision Award from USDA Rural Development, Best Business Recycling Program award from Iowa Recycling Association, Dedicated Services Award from Subway
- 2006 – Ed Garrett named "Executive of the Year" by The National Provisioner, Mount Pleasant and Sigourney plants receive Safety Awards from Iowa-Illinois Safety Council, a chapter of the National Safety Council
- 2007 – Quality Gold Standard Award from Subway

Hormel Spirit of Excellence Award in 1998, 1999, 2000, 2001, and 2002.

- 2008 – Subway Supply Chain Partner Award – Iowa-Illinois Safety Council Safety Award -Food Quality Award
- 2021 - Top Green Providers by Food Logistics'
