= West Hill Historic District (Muscatine, Iowa) =

Historic district in Iowa, United States

- U.S. National Register of Historic Places
- U.S. Historic district
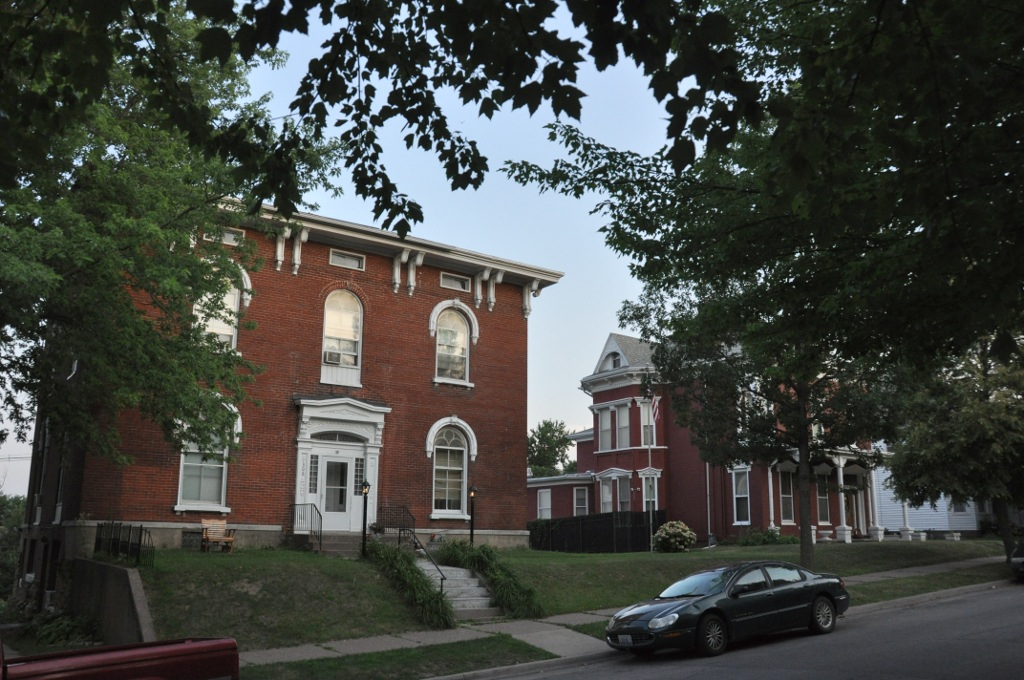

- Location within Iowa Location within the United States
- Location: Roughly bounded by W. 2nd St. from Pine to Ash, W. 3rd St., and W. 4th St. from Chestnut to near Ash, Muscatine, Iowa
- Coordinates: 41°25′10″N 91°03′03″W
- Area: 102 acres (41 ha)
- Architect: Willet L. Carroll; Cleveland and Jay
- MPS: Historical and Architectural Resources of Muscatine. Iowa MPS
- NRHP reference No.: 08000356
- Added to NRHP: April 30, 2008

The West Hill Historic District in Muscatine, Iowa is a historic district that was listed on the National Register of Historic Places in 2008. At that time, it included 258 contributing buildings, two contributing objects, two contributing sites, and 67 non-contributing buildings. The city of Muscatine was established as Bloomington in 1836. The original town was built on land that is generally flat along the Mississippi River. Residential areas were built on the surrounding hills, while commercial and industrial interests developed on the flatter land near the river. The West Hill Historic District is immediately to the west of the Downtown Commercial Historic District. The period of significance for West Hill begins in 1839 and ends in 1958. Some of the largest and oldest historic houses in Muscatine are located here, but it also includes smaller residences of the working and middle class. By 1915, 180 of the historic houses had been built. The rest were built from 1916 to 1958. Another eight houses were built between 1960 and 1995. A majority of the houses (80%) are two stories in height. Frame construction (70%) outnumbers brick construction (30%). The architectural styles that were prominent across the country are also found here and were built at the time they were popular.

== Contributing properties ==
The following contributing properties are individually listed on the National Register of Historic Places:

- Clark-Blackwell House
- Alexander Clark House
- Pliny and Adelia Fay House
- J. C. B. Warde House
