= Fair Oaks Historic District =

Historic district in Iowa, United States

- U.S. National Register of Historic Places
- U.S. Historic district
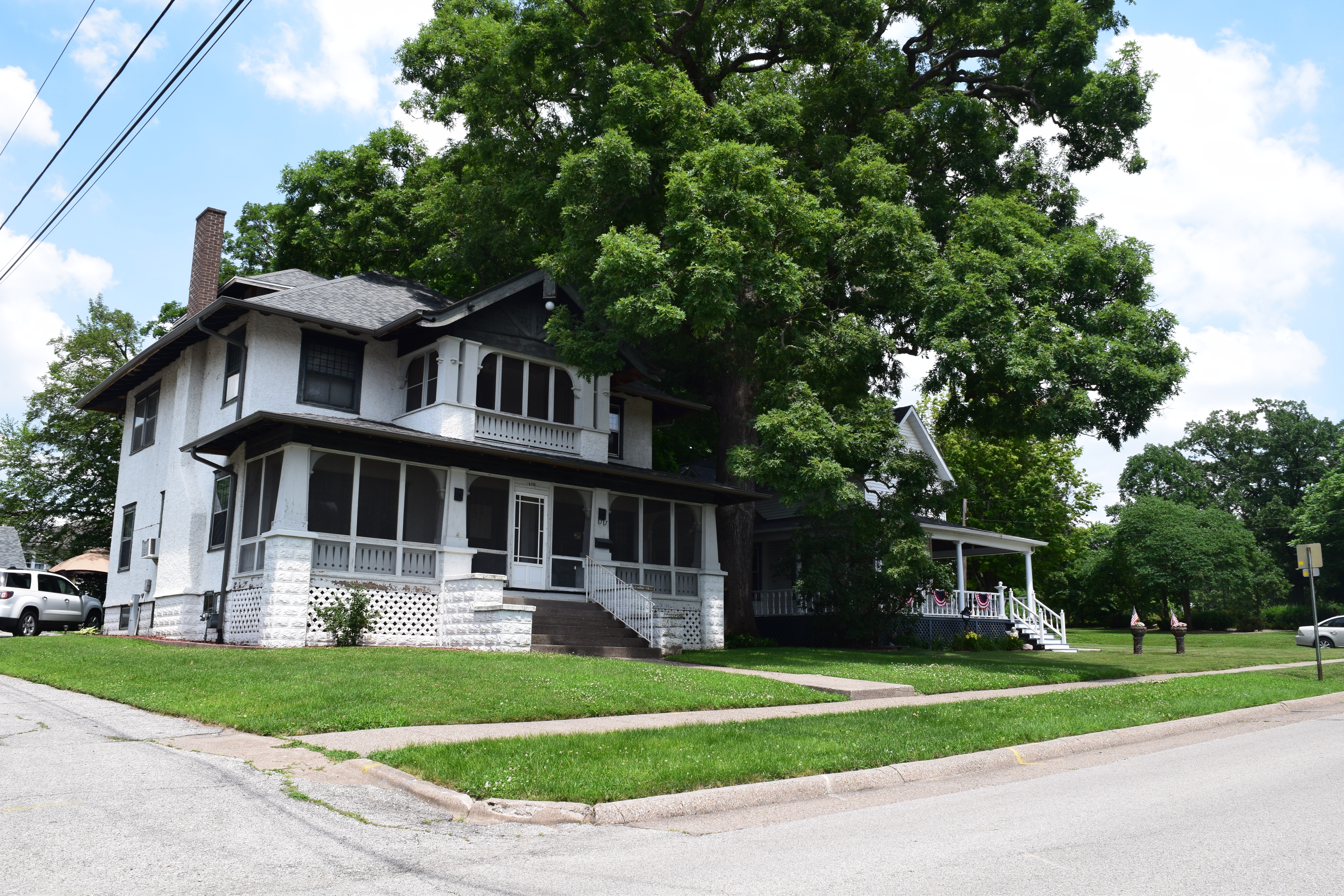

- Location within Iowa Location within the United States
- Location: Bounded by Park Ave., Washington St., Weed Park, and northern Fair Oaks Addition line, Muscatine, Iowa
- Coordinates: 41°26′14″N 91°01′39″W
- NRHP reference No.: 100004983
- Added to NRHP: February 24, 2020

The Fair Oaks Historic District is a nationally recognized historic district located in Muscatine, Iowa, United States. It was listed on the National Register of Historic Places in 2020. At the time it was studied for the Muscatine Historic Preservation Commission it contained 231 resources, which included 176 contributing buildings and 55 non-contributing buildings. Dr. James Weed was an early settler in Muscatine. He married Mary Swift in 1847, and the couple settled a farm on the northeast side of town where they built a Gothic Revival house from 1852 to 1854 (a contributing building). The couple donated 63 acres (25 ha) of wooded land on the east side of their property along the Mississippi River for a community park. Along the southern and western edges of their property, they plated subdivisions and eight houses had been built by the time of Mary's death in 1908. The rest of their property was opened up for development at that time and it was given the name Fair Oaks in a city-wide contest. It was divided into 101 lots. There were 57 houses in the subdivision by 1919, and 25 houses and a grocery store were built in the 1920s. Between 1930 and 1944 another 15 houses were built, 11 houses between 1945 and 1954, 13 houses between 1955 and 1965, and four houses since 1965.

Fair Oaks consists of 134 houses, some with an attached garage, 94 detached garages and other outbuildings, and three commercial buildings. Six houses do not have a garage of any kind. Most of the houses are either bungalows or modest two-story houses. Twenty-four houses are brick or brick veneer with the remaining houses being wood-frame. The exteriors of 12 houses were finished with stucco. A variety of architectural styles are found in the neighborhood that reflects the time period they were built.
