= Clark–Blackwell House =

Historic house in Iowa, United States

- U.S. National Register of Historic Places
- U.S. Historic district – Contributing property
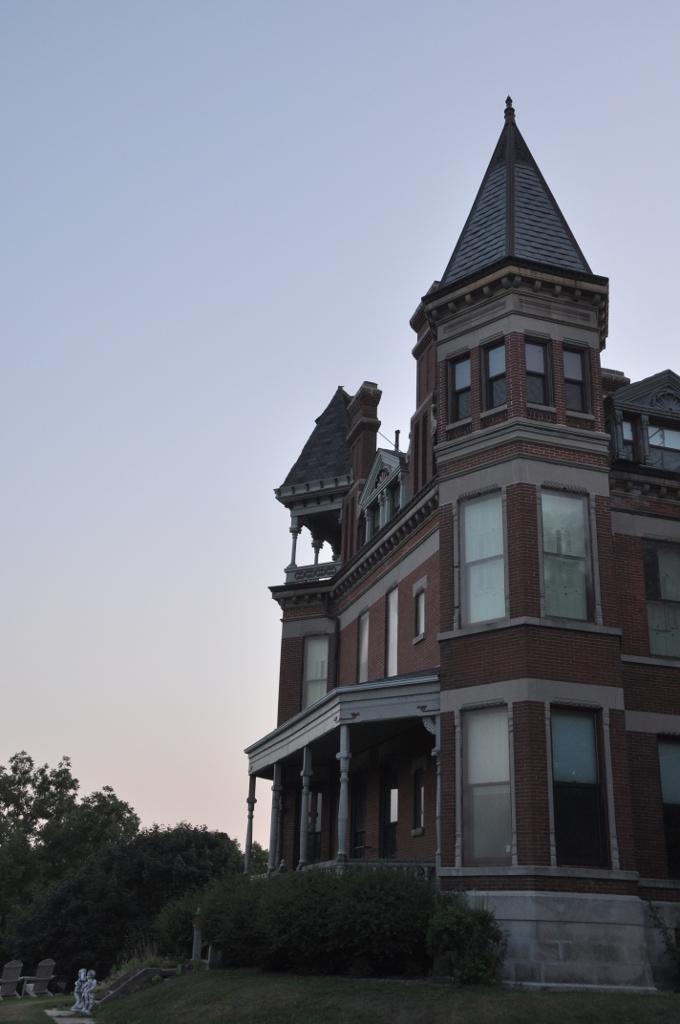

- Location within Iowa Location within the United States
- Location: 206 Cherry St. Muscatine, Iowa
- Coordinates: 41°25′01″N 91°03′12″W
- Area: less than one acre
- Built: 1882
- Architect: Lorenzo D. Cleveland
- Architectural style: Victorian
- Part of: West Hill Historic District (ID06000423)
- NRHP reference No.: 83000396
- Added to NRHP: January 27, 1983

The Clark–Blackwell House is an historic residence located in Muscatine, Iowa, United States. It has been listed on the National Register of Historic Places since 1983. The house was included as a contributing property in the West Hill Historic District in 2008.

== History ==
The property on which the house sits was purchased by William A. Clark, a Muscatine real estate and loan broker, in 1871. He lived in the house that had been built there previously until this house was completed in 1882. It was designed by Chicago architect Lorenzo D. Cleveland and built by George D. Magoon, a local contractor. Clark continued to live in the house at least until 1886. By 1889 he had relocated to New York City. John Scott Blackwell was another local real estate agent who lived in the house from 1902 until his death in 1930. His wife continued to live here until 1943. Harry F. Bowsman, a local businessman, lived here from 1946 to 1963. His wife continued to live in the house after his death.

== Architecture ==
The Victorian eclectic style house is located on a bluff overlooking the Mississippi River. Its exterior ornamentation incorporates multiple stylistic elements, and is composed of Baltimore pressed brick that was laid in a running bond. It features red granite columns with limestone capitals that flank the main entrance, limestone window sills and lintels, a tin and limestone cornice, and a slate hip roof. Towers project from the east and west corners. The west corner tower is capped with a pyramidal roof and the east corner tower is capped with a hexagonal turret roof.
