= Muscatine County Home Dairy Barn =

- U.S. National Register of Historic Places
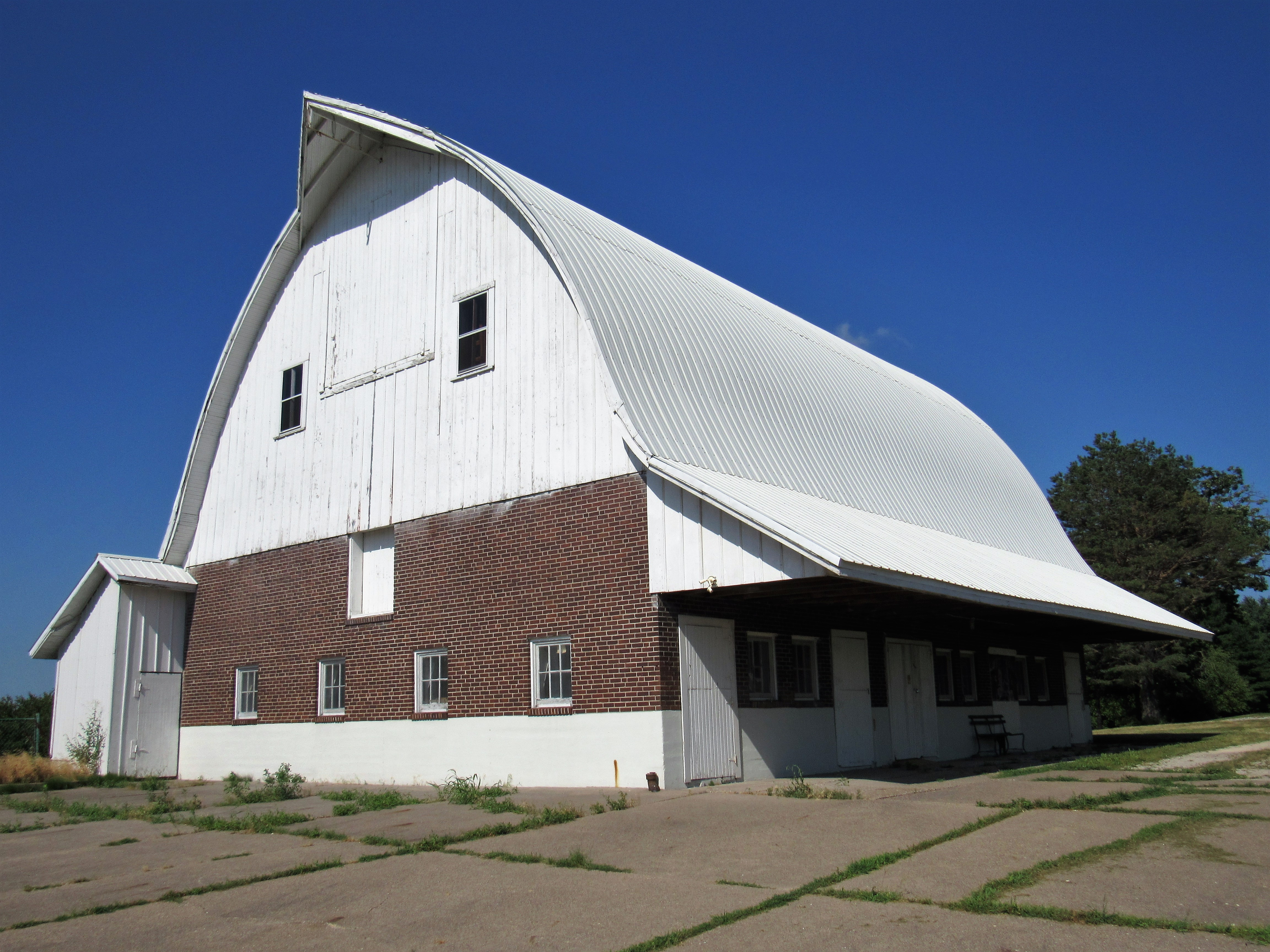

- Location within Iowa Location within the United States
- Location: 3210 Harmony Ln. Muscatine, Iowa
- Coordinates: 41°26′02″N 91°05′06″W
- Built: 1926
- NRHP reference No.: 100003365
- Added to NRHP: January 31, 2019

The Muscatine County Home Dairy Barn, also known as the Old Barn, is a historic building on the west side of Muscatine, Iowa, United States. The barn was built in 90 days on the county home property in 1926. It replaced other barns that had been struck by lightning and were destroyed by the resulting fire. The home was an early form of welfare system known as the poor farm. It housed indigent, homeless, or disabled people who in turn worked on the farm to cover their costs of care and food. The barn was nearly torn down in 2006 when a group of volunteers called the Friends of the Old Barn acquired and restored it. It was also in danger of being torn down in 2017 because of its lack of utilities when a nearby building which provided them to the barn was slated to be torn down. The barn is now a museum located near the Muscatine Arboretum and the Muscatine County Environmental Learning Center. It was listed on the National Register of Historic Places in 2019.

It has a hay hood.
