= Alexander Clark House =

Historic house in Iowa, United States

- U.S. National Register of Historic Places
- U.S. Historic district – Contributing property
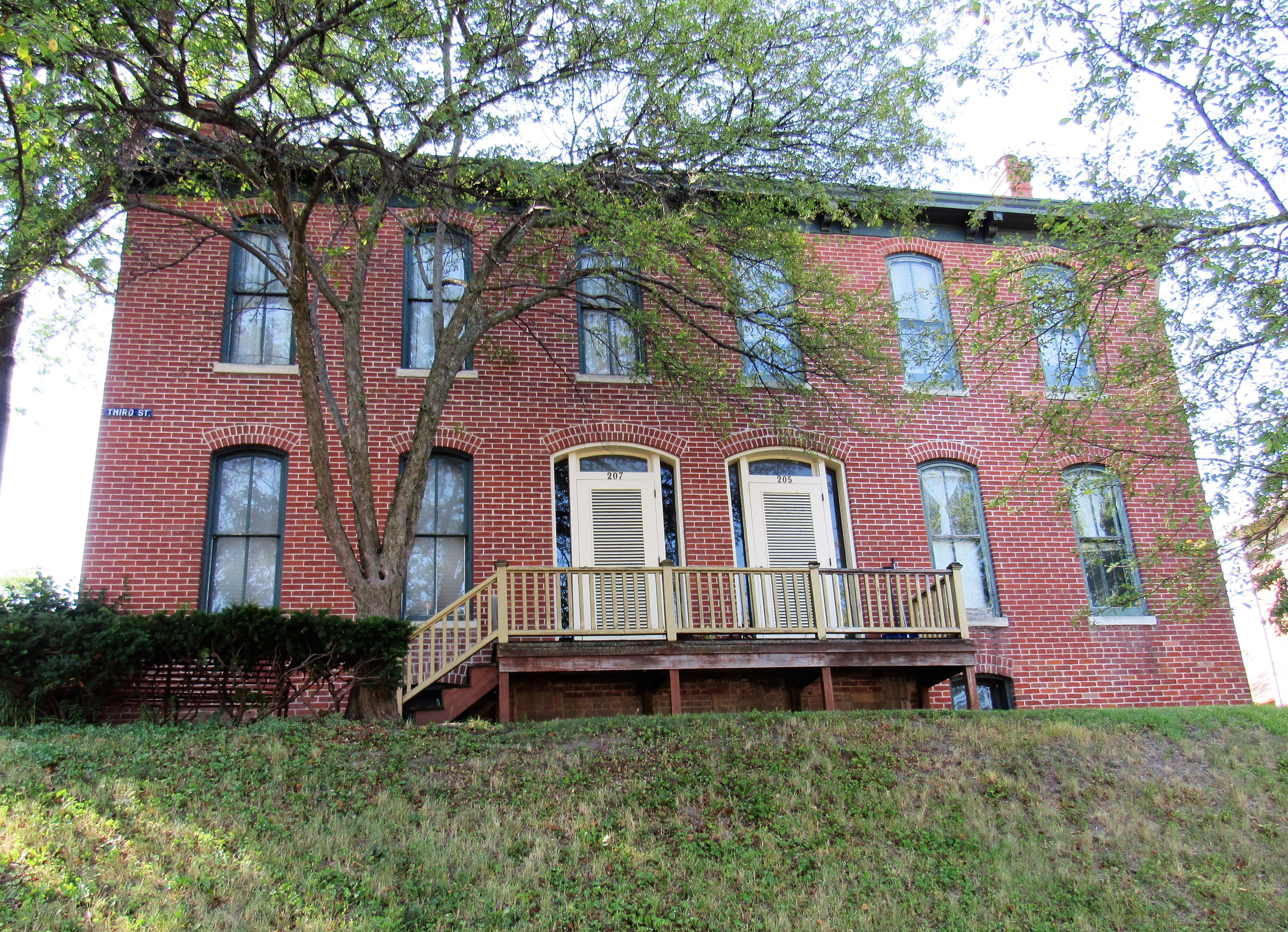

- Location within Iowa Location within the United States
- Location: 203 W. 3rd St. Muscatine, Iowa
- Coordinates: 41°25′17″N 91°2′53″W
- Area: less than one acre
- Built: 1879
- Architectural style: Italianate
- Part of: West Hill Historic District (ID06000423)
- NRHP reference No.: 76000796
- Added to NRHP: October 14, 1976

The Alexander Clark House is a historic house located in Muscatine, Iowa, United States. The house is associated with Alexander Clark (1826–1891), an African American civil rights pioneer and US Minister to Liberia. Clark was a 19th-century abolitionist who made his home in Muscatine for most of his adult life. He fought and won for the integration of public schools in Iowa when his daughter was forbidden to attend her neighborhood school. The case went to the Iowa Supreme Court, which resulted in the integration of all schools in the state. He was an associate of Frederick Douglass, helped to establish Iowa's only Colored regiment during the American Civil War, and the African Methodist Episcopal Church in Muscatine. Clark was named the Minister to Liberia in 1890 by President Benjamin Harrison, where he died a year later. The house was built in 1879 after a fire destroyed Clark's previous house. It was moved 200 feet (61 m) from its original location in 1975, The house was individually listed on the National Register of Historic Places in 1976. It was included as a contributing property in the West Hill Historic District in 2008.
