= Pine Mills German Methodist Episcopal Church =

- U.S. National Register of Historic Places
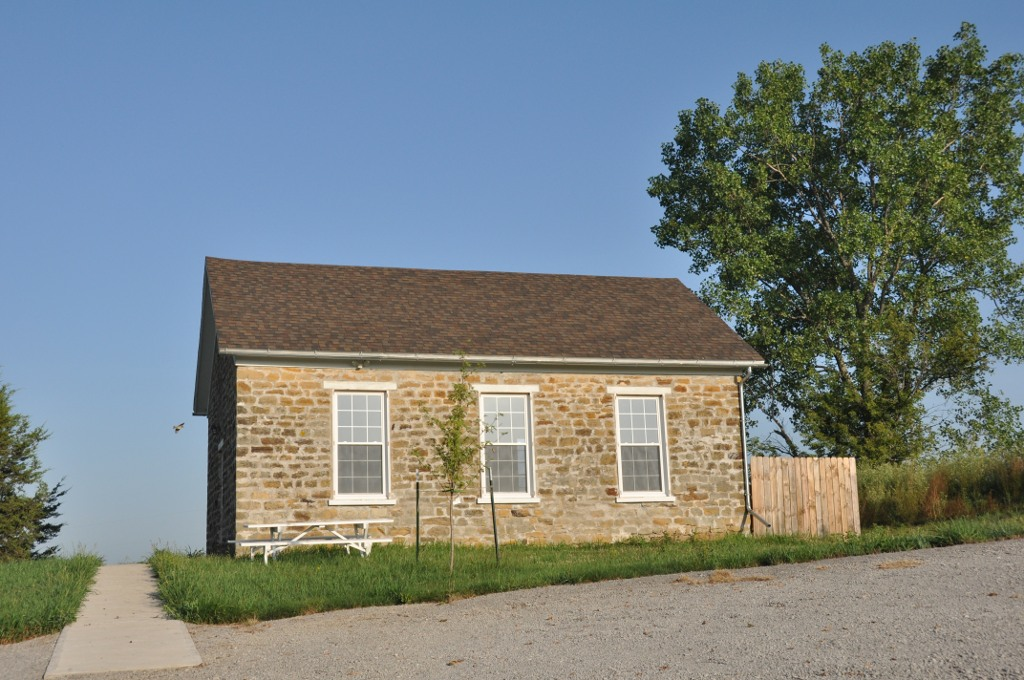

- Location within Iowa Location within the United States
- Location: 180th St. and Verde Ave. Muscatine, Iowa
- Coordinates: 41°28′50″N 90°52′51″W
- Built: 1867
- NRHP reference No.: 03001051
- Added to NRHP: October 17, 2003

Pine Mills German Methodist Episcopal Church is an historic building located in Muscatine County, Iowa, United States. The building was built by volunteers in 1867. The congregation was made up of German immigrants who desired to maintain their own language and culture in their religious practices. The last service was held in the church on Christmas Eve 1910. The building passed to private ownership and was used as a farm building and workshop. Over the years the building deteriorated because of disuse. It was donated by Paul Kemper, who owned it, to the Muscatine Area Heritage Association. Renovation of the former church was spearheaded by the American Schleswig Holstein Heritage Society and the Muscatine Community Foundation. The building was listed on the National Register of Historic Places in 2003.
