= Wildcat Den State Park =

State park in Muscatine County, Iowa

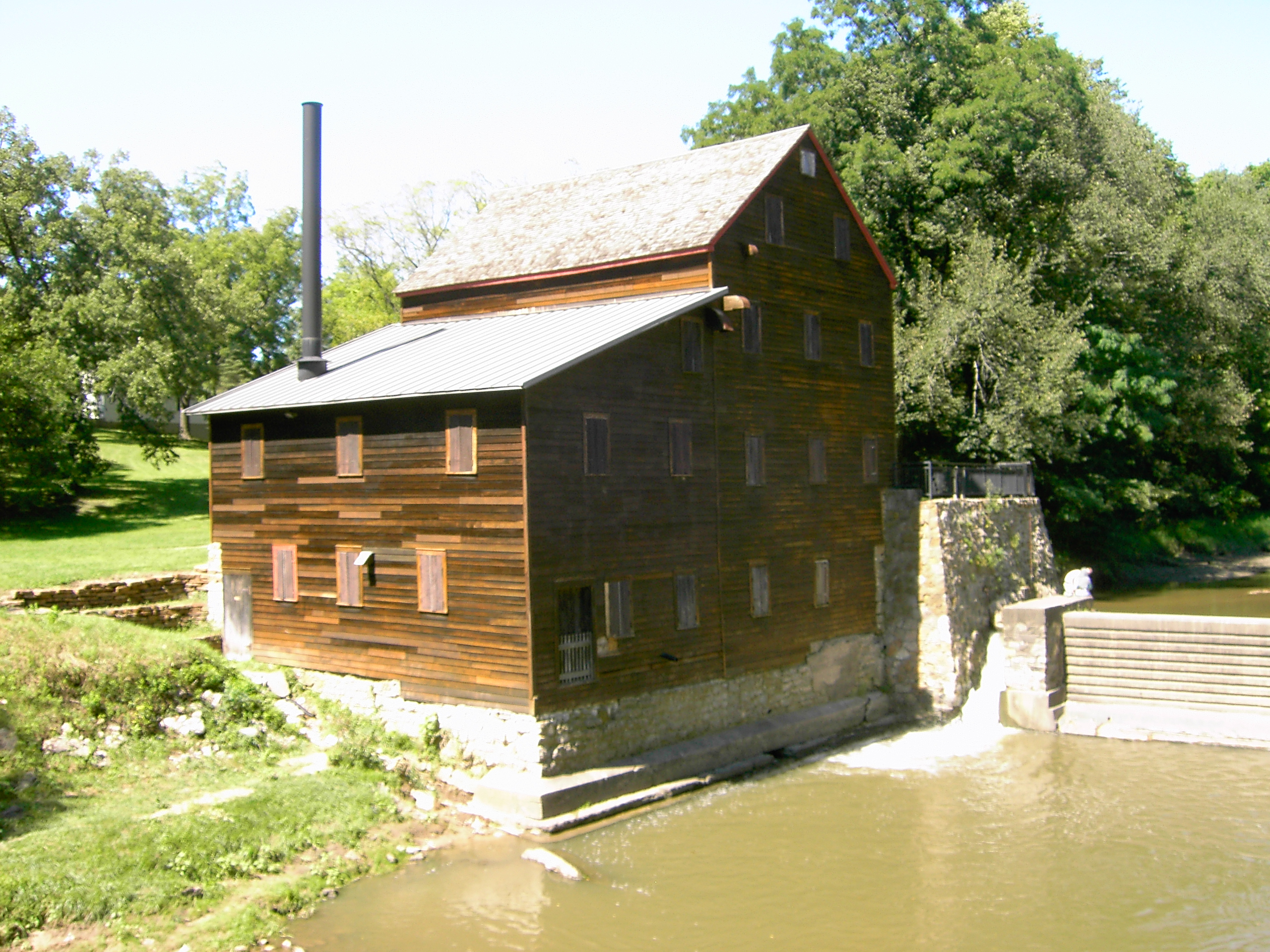
- Pine Creek Grist Mill

- Location within Iowa Location within the United States
- Location: Muscatine County, Iowa, United States
- Coordinates: 41°28′10″N 90°52′56″W
- Area: 423 acres (171 ha)
- Elevation: 627 ft (191 m)
- Administrator: Iowa Department of Natural Resources
- Website: Official website

Wildcat Den State Park is a state park in Muscatine County, Iowa, United States. The park features 75-foot (23 m) cliffs, rock formations, and several historic structures. The 1848 Pine Creek Gristmill and Pine Mill Bridge are both on the National Register of Historic Places. In addition to its historic and geological features, the park offers hiking trails and primitive camping.
