= Henry E. and Ella M. (Knott) Nicolaus House =

Historic house in Iowa, United States

- U.S. National Register of Historic Places
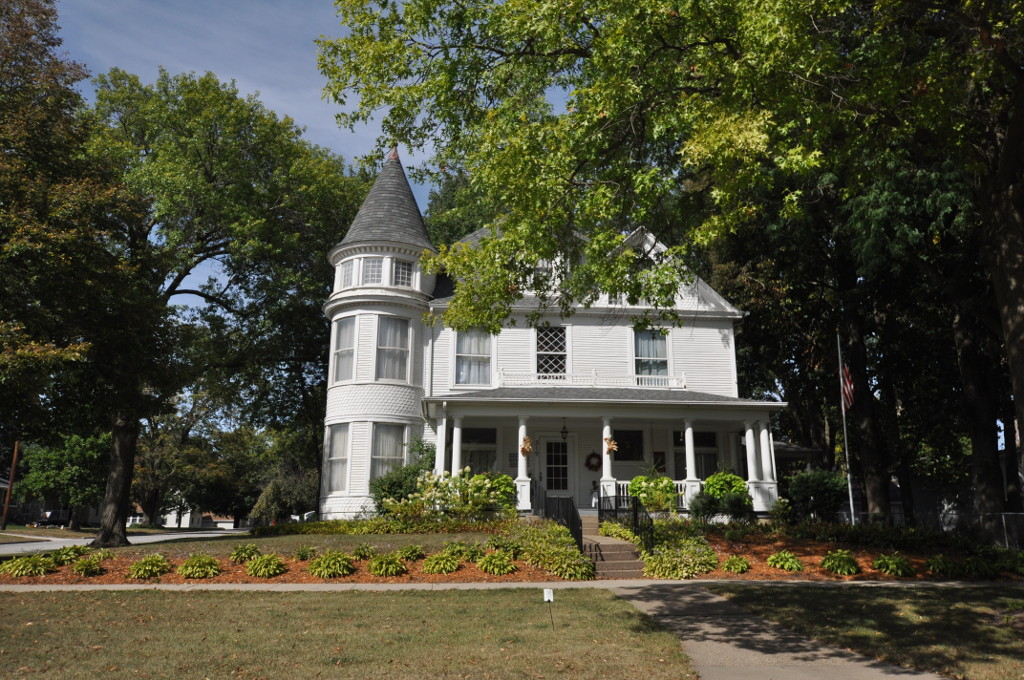

- Location within Iowa Location within the United States
- Location: 319 4th St. W. Wilton, Iowa
- Coordinates: 41°35′21″N 91°01′15″W
- Area: less than one acre
- Built: 1898 (renovation)
- Architectural style: Queen Anne
- NRHP reference No.: 100000968
- Added to NRHP: May 8, 2017

Henry E. and Ella M. (Knott) Nicolaus House, also known as the Samuel G. and Mary Kelley House and the Rebeckah Allgood Residence, is a historic building located in Wilton, Iowa, United States. The house was already on this property when Henry Nicholas bought it in 1896. Nicolaus was a prominent local businessman and civic leader who represented Muscatine County in the Iowa House of Representatives. He and his wife Ella had the Queen Anne elements added to the house in 1898. The house features a three-story corner tower, prominent front porch, two balconies, and a stained glass window on the main facade. It was listed on the National Register of Historic Places in 2017.
