= Doctor Alexander R. (A.R.) and Louisa J. Leith House =

Historic house in Iowa, United States

- U.S. National Register of Historic Places
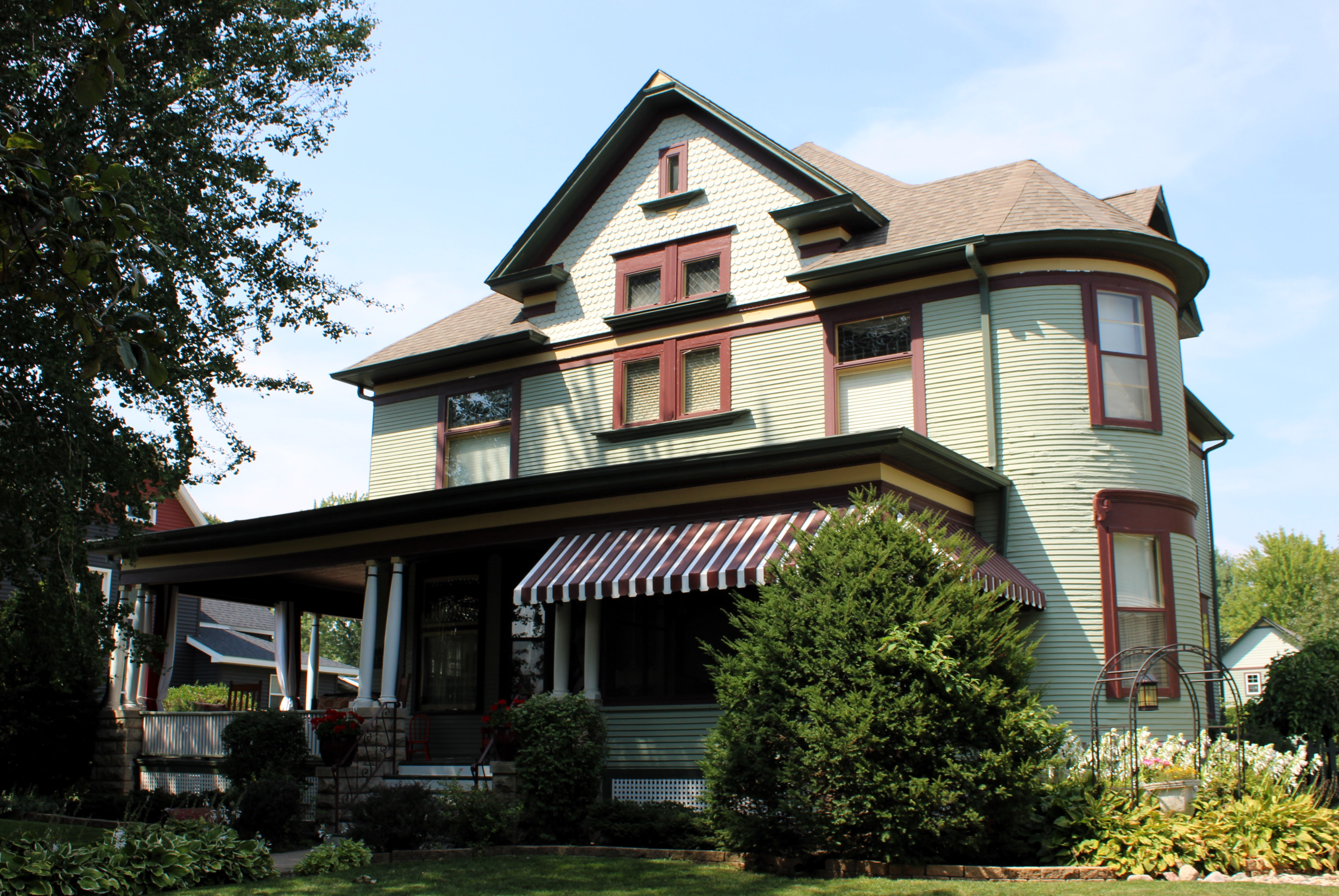

- Location within Iowa Location within the United States
- Location: 117 West 6th St. Wilton, Iowa
- Coordinates: 41°35′28″N 91°01′04.9″W
- Area: less than one acre
- Built: 1904
- Architectural style: Queen Anne
- NRHP reference No.: 100005657
- Added to NRHP: October 2, 2020

Doctor Alexander R. (A.R.) and Louisa J. Leith House is a historic building located in Wilton, Iowa, United States. The 2½-story, wood frame, Queen Anne structure is significant because of its architecture. It features a complex, cross-gable roof, an asymmetrical main façade, an engaged two-story circular tower, a variety of surface textures, leaded glass windows, and highly decorative interior woodwork. It is unknown who designed the house, but it is thought it might have been constructed by a local builder based on plans from a pattern book. The 1½-story, wood-frame carriage house at the rear of the property along West Wate Street shares the historical designation with the main house. It has been converted into an entertainment area. The two-car garage built in the 1930s does not share the designation.

Dr. A.R. Leith was one of the first physicians in town. His son, Dr. G.G. Leith, resided here after his father's death. The family continued ownership of the house until 1976. Both doctors held various offices in the Union Savings Bank of Wilton, and they owned a commercial block downtown Wilton where their medical practice was located. The house and carriage house were listed together on the National Register of Historic Places in 2020.
