= West Liberty Commercial Historic District =

Historic district in Iowa, United States

- West Liberty Commercial; Historic District
- U.S. National Register of Historic Places
- U.S. Historic district
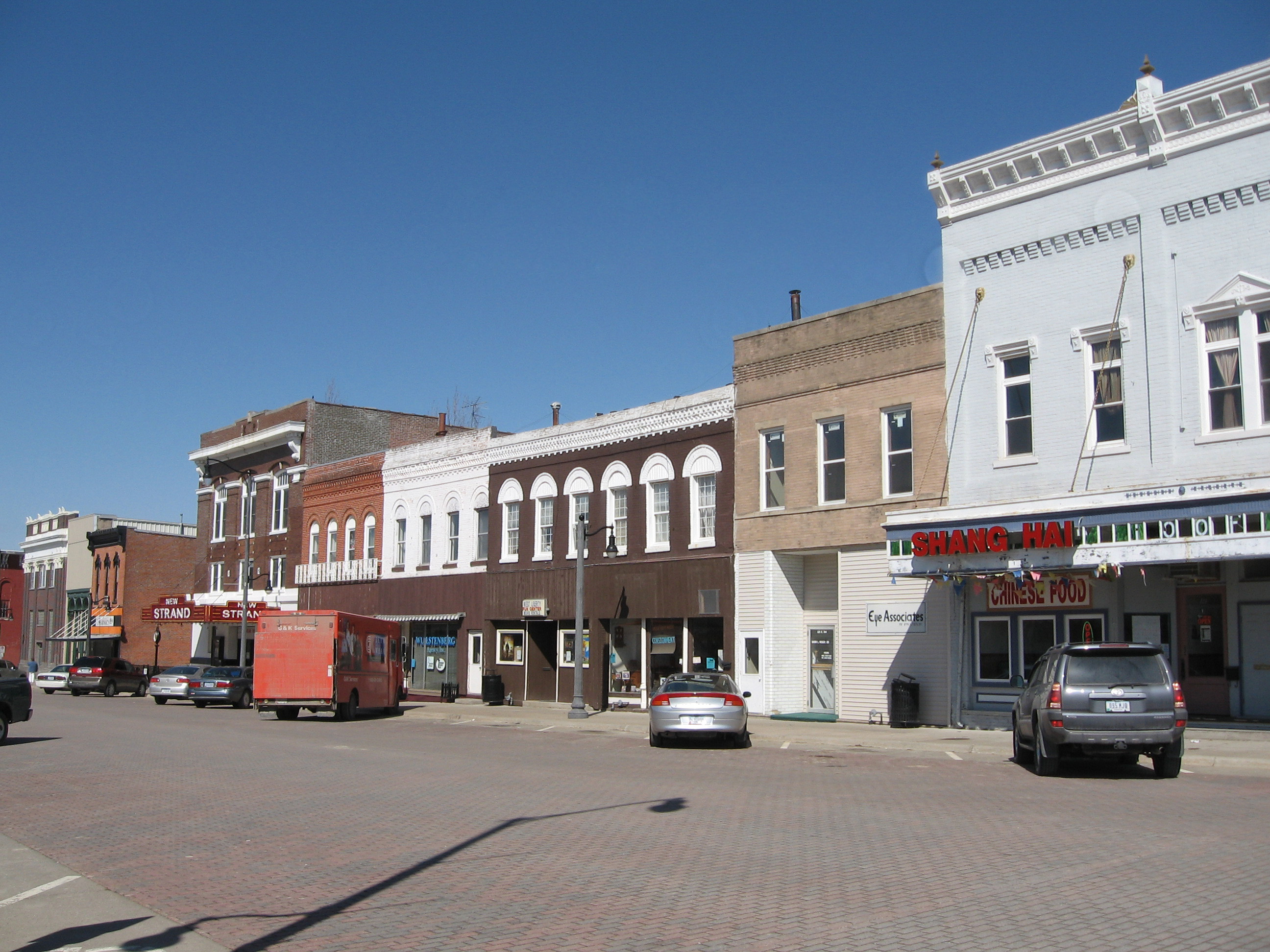

- Location within Iowa Location within the United States
- Location: Bounded by 4th St., railroad tracks, and Clay and Spencer Sts., West Liberty, Iowa
- Coordinates: 41°34′12″N 91°15′48″W
- Area: 14 acres (5.7 ha)
- Architectural style: Italianate; Neoclassical
- MPS: Iowa's Main Street Commercial Architecture MPS
- NRHP reference No.: 02001035
- Added to NRHP: September 12, 2002

The West Liberty Commercial Historic District in West Liberty, Iowa, United States, is a historic district that was listed on the National Register of Historic Places in 2002. At that time, it included 41 contributing buildings, six other contributing structures, and eight non-contributing buildings.

West Liberty was established in the Iowa Territory as Wapsipinoc Settlement after near-by Wapsipinoc Creek. The town itself was platted when the Mississippi and Missouri Railroad was built here in 1855. The railroad later became the Chicago, Rock Island, and Pacific. The town was first incorporated on January 1, 1868. By the early 1870s the Burlington, Cedar Rapids and Minnesota Railroad was also built through town. It became part of the Rock Island system in 1903. The presence of the railroads led to the town's prosperity in the late 19th and early 20th centuries.

Most of the buildings in the district were built by 1922. Four of the infill buildings were completed in the 1940s, and largely replaced older buildings that were lost to fire. Two more buildings were built in the 1970s and the 1980s. Most of the buildings are masonry construction, and a majority of those are brick, with only a couple of frame buildings. Structures with Italianate and Neoclassical features predominate in the district. Generally, the buildings are two stories in height, with none taller than three stories. Large corner buildings anchor each block. Most of the buildings have housed retail establishments, but others housed banks, fraternal halls, a movie theater, and an opera house. There are also a few houses in the district on West Fourth Street.

Five of the contributing structures are the streets that were paved with brick in 1915. There is a small portion of Calhoun Street near the railroad tracks that is now asphalt with the original bricks being removed. The sixth contributing structure is the grain elevator that anchors the southwest corner of the district. It is of an older crib style construction.
