= Pine Mill Bridge =

- U.S. National Register of Historic Places
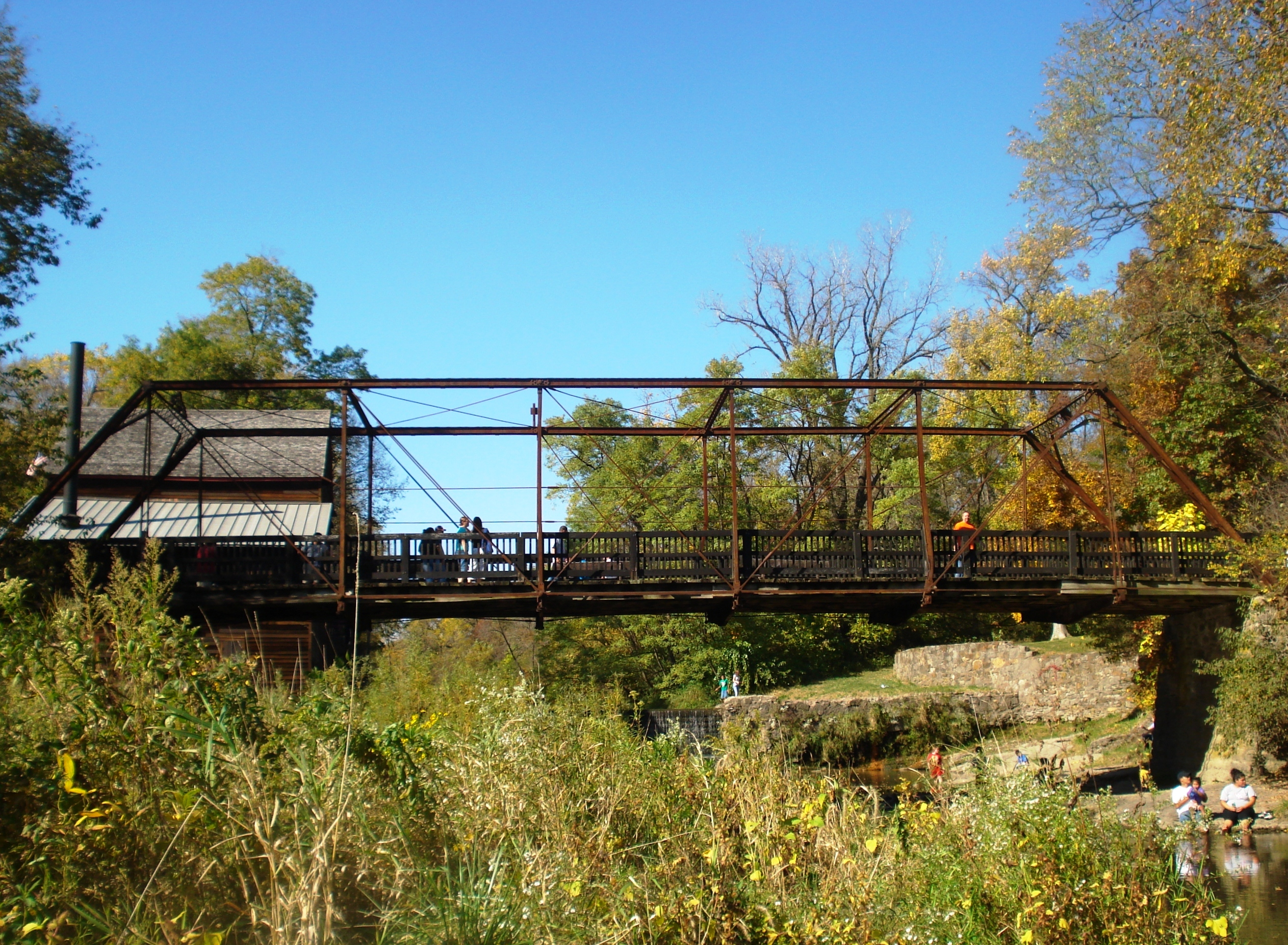

- Location within Iowa Location within the United States
- Location: Over Pine Creek in Wildcat Den State Park
- Coordinates: 41°28′3″N 90°52′2″W
- Built: 1878
- Architect: Wrought Iron Bridge Company
- Architectural style: Pratt Truss bridge
- MPS: Highway Bridges of Iowa MPS
- NRHP reference No.: 98000493
- Added to NRHP: May 15, 1998

The Pine Mill Bridge is an historic structure located in Wildcat Den State Park in rural Muscatine County, Iowa, United States. It was built in 1878 near the Pine Creek Gristmill, the only place in Iowa where a mill and bridge combination remains in place. The bridge was listed on the National Register of Historic Places in 1998 as a part of the Highway Bridges of Iowa MPS.

== History ==
The citizens of Montpelier Township petitioned the Muscatine County Board of Supervisors in 1877 for a bridge over Pine Creek at the site of the mill where they needed a crossing to transport their crops. For most of the year the creek was easily crossed, but after a heavy rainfall it was turned into a raging stream. Financial considerations delayed the project for a year when the board solicited bids for the construction of the bridge. In September 1878 a contract to manufacture and erect the truss was issued to the Wrought Iron Bridge Company of Canton, Ohio. The bridge was completed by the end of the year. While it was one of numerous bridge and mill combinations across the state of Iowa, it is the only one that remains.

== Design ==
The Pine Mill Bridge is a standard pin-connected Pratt through truss bridge offered by the Wrought Iron Bridge Company. The span is composed of seven panels, and is 96 feet (29 m) long. The roadway is 16 feet (5 m) wide.

== See also ==
- List of bridges documented by the Historic American Engineering Record in Iowa
