= Pliny and Adelia Fay House =

Historic house in Iowa, United States

- U.S. National Register of Historic Places
- U.S. Historic district – Contributing property
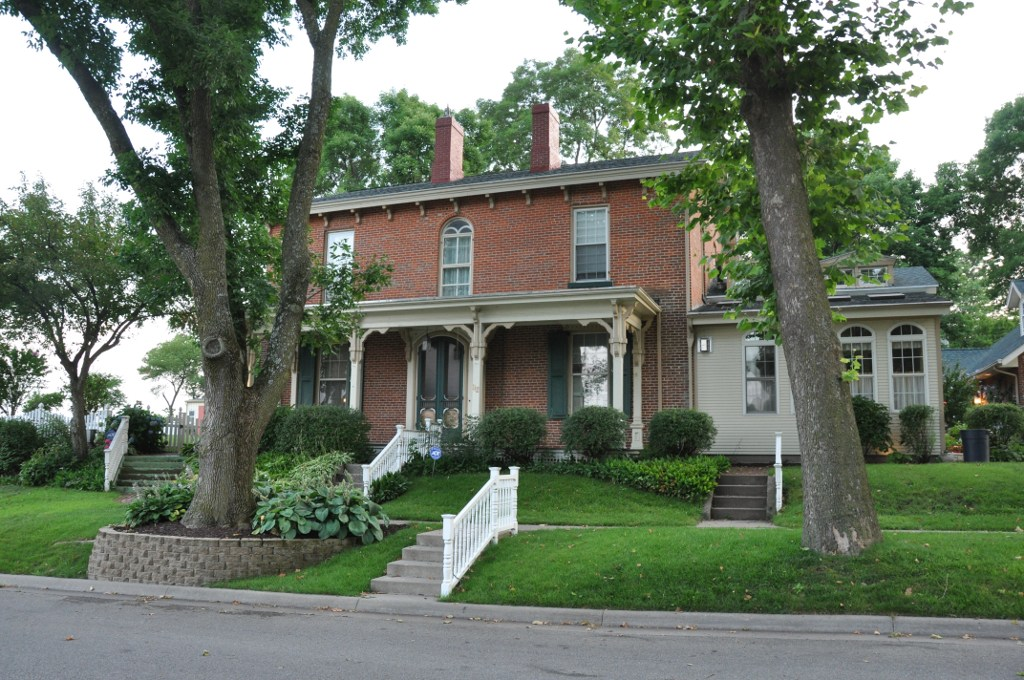

- Location within Iowa Location within the United States
- Location: 112 Locust St. Muscatine, Iowa
- Coordinates: 41°25′04″N 91°03′03″W
- Area: less than one acre
- Built: 1854
- Architectural style: Italianate
- Part of: West Hill Historic District (ID06000423)
- NRHP reference No.: 98000382
- Added to NRHP: April 23, 1998

Pliny and Adelia Fay House is a historic residence in Muscatine, Iowa, United States. It was listed on the National Register of Historic Places in 1998. The house was included as a contributing property in the West Hill Historic District in 2008.

== History ==
A native of Massachusetts, Pliny Fay was one of the first settlers in the town of Bloomington, later renamed Muscatine. He joined his brother Edward here in 1837, a year after the town was surveyed and platted. The brothers were involved in the economic, political, and social life of the new town. They opened the second pharmacy in town and operated it together until Edward died in 1848. Pliny took on Frederick H. Stone as a partner, and they remained in business for at least another ten years. Adelia St. John was another New Englander who settled in Bloomington in its early years. She was the sister of William and Hamilton St. John, who were early land speculators in the area. She and Pliny were married in 1840.

The Fays become prosperous enough to buy this property on the bluff overlooking the Mississippi River in 1853. According to property tax records, the house was built the following year. Its architect and builder are unknown. The house had to be moved from its original location sometime between 1866 and 1874 because of severe erosion along the bluff. Pliny and Adelia lived here with their two daughters and one son. The two daughters were married in 1867. Pliny's mother lived with them until her death in 1871. The Fay's sold the house in 1872 or 1873 and relocated to Santa Cruz, California for health reasons.

== Architecture ==
The Italianate style is found in the porch, vestibule, round-headed window on the main facade, and the bracketed eaves of the house. It also has a low pitched roof, Palladian window, and symmetrical interior chimneys that are more typical of the Georgian style. This combination of styles is an example of the fluidity and variety of the architecture found in Iowa's river towns. The inclusion of the Georgian style reflects the continuity between the frontier areas and the established settlements of New England from which the early settlers came.
