= J. C. B. Warde House =

Historic house in Iowa, United States

- U.S. National Register of Historic Places
- U.S. Historic district – Contributing property
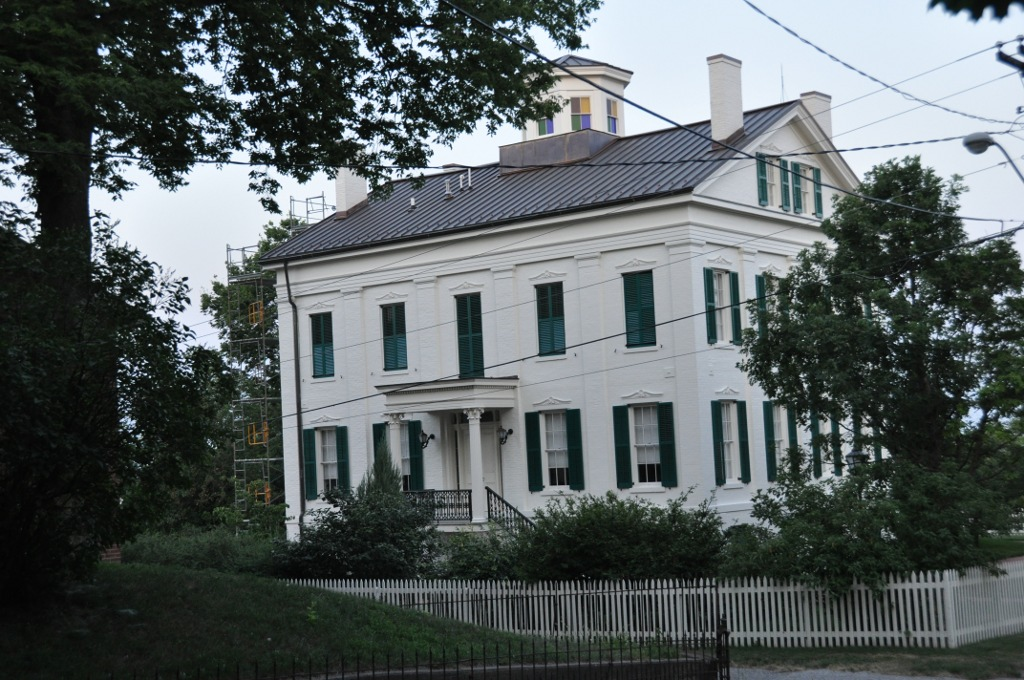
- The rear elevation of the house in 2012

- Location within Iowa Location within the United States
- Location: 205 Cherry St. Muscatine, Iowa
- Coordinates: 41°25′02″N 91°03′09″W
- Area: less than one acre
- Built: 1852-1854
- Architectural style: Greek Revival
- Part of: West Hill Historic District (ID06000423)
- NRHP reference No.: 79000920
- Added to NRHP: April 26, 1979

J. C. B. Warde House is an historic residence located in Muscatine, Iowa, United States. It has been listed on the National Register of Historic Places since 1979. The house was included as a contributing property in the West Hill Historic District in 2008.

== History ==
The house was begun in the spring of 1852 for a local attorney named J.C.B. Warde. He abruptly left town with creditors in pursuit in the fall of the same year. It was bought by General John G. Gordon at a sheriff's sale in 1853, and he completed the house the following year. After his death in 1877 Cora Chaplin Weed, a Muscatine socialite, bought the house. She was noteworthy for her lavish parties. Doctors J.L. Klein and A.J. Weaver bought the house and converted it into a private hospital, which functioned here into the 1970s.

== Architecture ==
The Warde House is a fine example of residential Greek Revival architecture in Iowa. It is primarily constructed in brick with decorative elements executed in limestone, wood, and metal. It measures 40 by 59 feet (12 by 18 m) and features five bays on the front and four bays along each side. The bays are divided by pilasters that support a full entablature encircling the house. The main facade overlooks the Mississippi River and is dominated by a prostyle portico. It features four wooden columns in the Corinthian order that supports a triangular pediment. A cupola rests in the center of the side gabled roof.
