= Pine Creek Gristmill =

- U.S. National Register of Historic Places
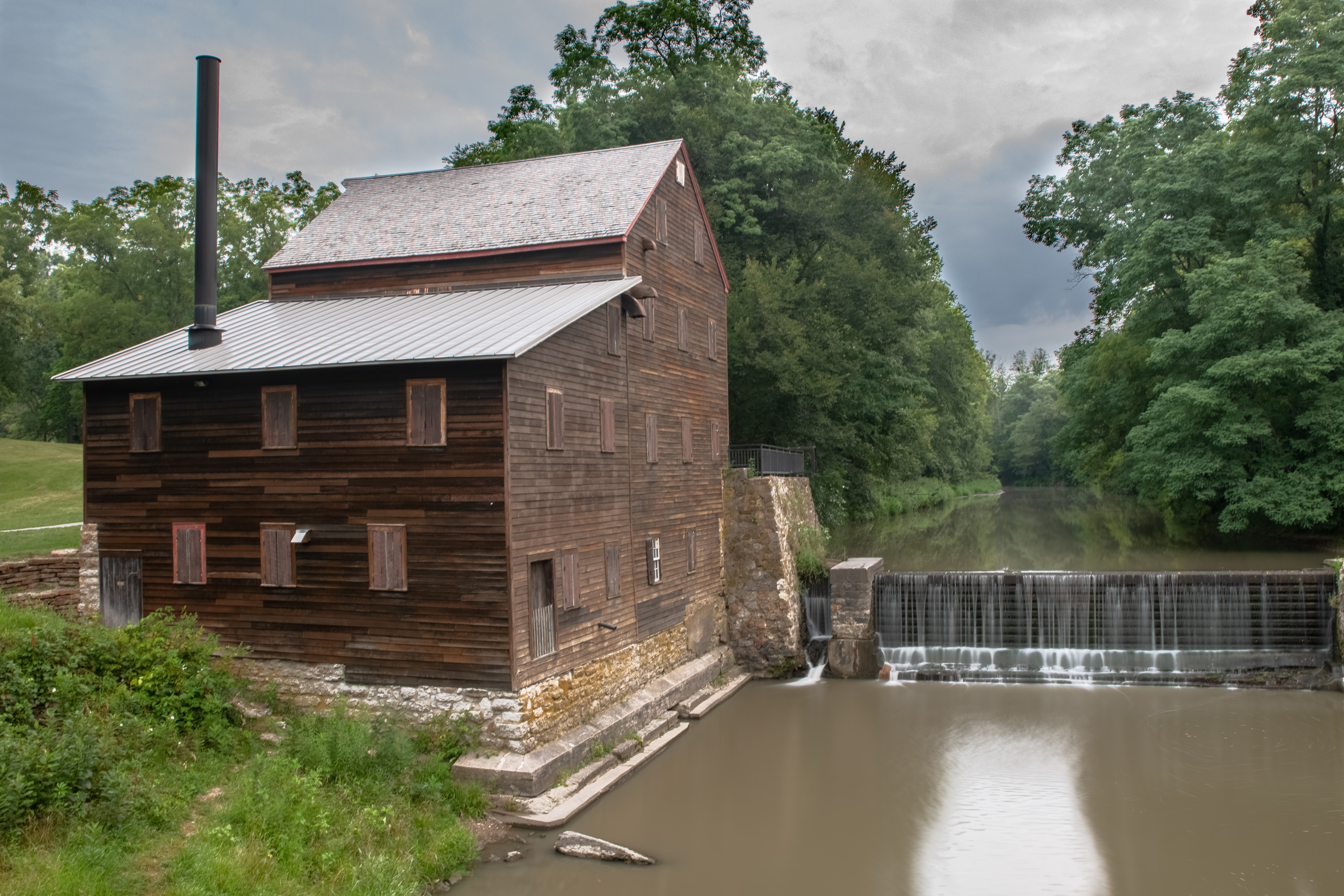

- Location within Iowa Location within the United States
- Location: Northeast of Muscatine in Wildcat Den State Park
- Coordinates: 41°28′03″N 90°52′03″W
- Built: 1848
- NRHP reference No.: 79000919
- Added to NRHP: December 10, 1979

Pine Creek Gristmill is a historic building located in Wildcat Den State Park in Muscatine County, Iowa, United States. The building was listed on the National Register of Historic Places in 1979.

== History ==
Benjamin Nye was one of the first permanent white settlers/residents to the area after it was opened to settlement in 1833. He and his cousin built their homes near the Mississippi River and named the settlement Montpelier as they were originally from Vermont. He built his first mill in 1835, but it was washed out because it was built too close to the Mississippi river. Nye built a water powered saw mill further upstream to the North on Pine Creek. Two years later he added a gristmill across the creek. He also built the county's first store and post office. As his business expanded the present mill was built by Nye in 1848 for $10,000 (then dollars) with timber he cut in his own mill. Benjamin Nye was murdered by one of his two sons-in-law (George McCoy) in 1852 and the mill passed to his other son-in-law Robert Patterson. Herman Huchendorf, a German immigrant to Muscatine County, had bought the mill by the time the Pine Mill Bridge was erected in 1876. The creek was easily crossed for most of the year, but when the water was high it was difficult for farmers to bring their grain to the mill. While this was one of numerous bridge and mill combinations across the state of Iowa it is the only one that remains in place today.

The mill essentially appears as it has since the 1920s and is a museum of the range of milling processes that were used between 1848 and 1929. Originally the mill had two sets of millstones that produced flour from wheat that was grown locally. It used a process known in the trade as the “New Process.” The mill was reequipped in 1880 when its technology became obsolete.

== Architecture ==
The main part of the building is three and a half stories that measures 40 feet (12 m) by 45 feet (14 m). It is attached to a two-story addition that measures 35 feet (11 m) by 45 feet (14 m). The building was built of native oak beams. It utilizes mortise and tenon joints that are connected with wooden pegs.

The mill itself was powered by a 20-horsepower water turbine from approximately 1848 to 1878, and after 1878, a 40 to 60-horsepower steam engine back-up when the water level was low. The mill has three separate plants in it. The main plant is a “three stand” double roller mill that produced wheat flour and is located on all three floors. A single stand triple roller milling plant was added to mill corn. It includes a set of 36 inches (91 cm) grindstones to produce Buckwheat flour.
