= Big Slough Creek Bridge =

- U.S. National Register of Historic Places
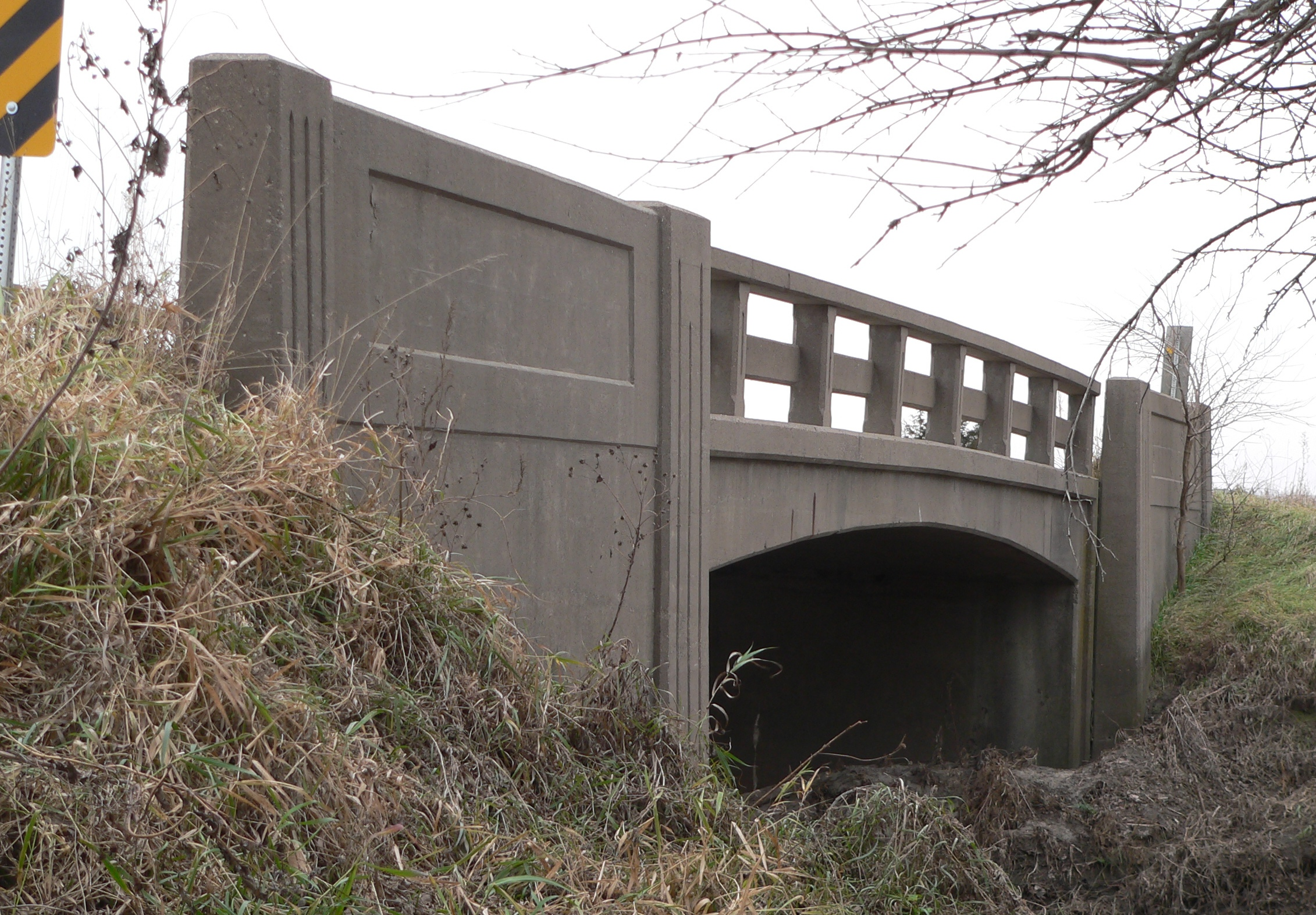

- Location within Iowa Location within the United States
- Location: Bancroft Ave. over Big Slough Creek near Nichols, Iowa
- Coordinates: 41°28′38″N 91°20′53″W
- Built: 1937
- Architect: Otto Wendling
- MPS: Highway Bridges of Iowa MPS
- NRHP reference No.: 98000492
- Added to NRHP: May 15, 1998

Big Slough Creek Bridge is an historic structure located near the town of Nichols in rural Muscatine County, Iowa, United States. The concrete rigid frame bridge was built in 1937. It was designed by Otto Wendling of the Iowa State Highway Commission. The bridge was listed on the National Register of Historic Places in 1998 as a part of the Highway Bridges of Iowa MPS.

== Gallery ==
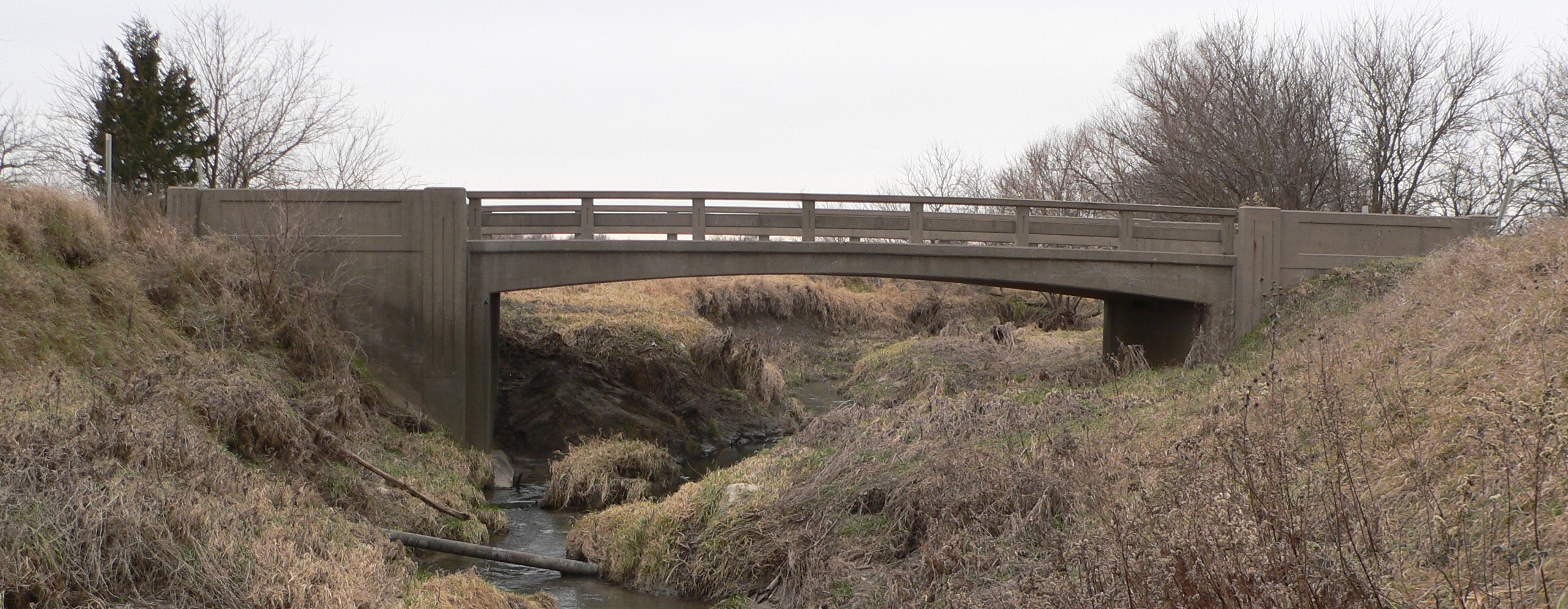
Big Slough Bridge

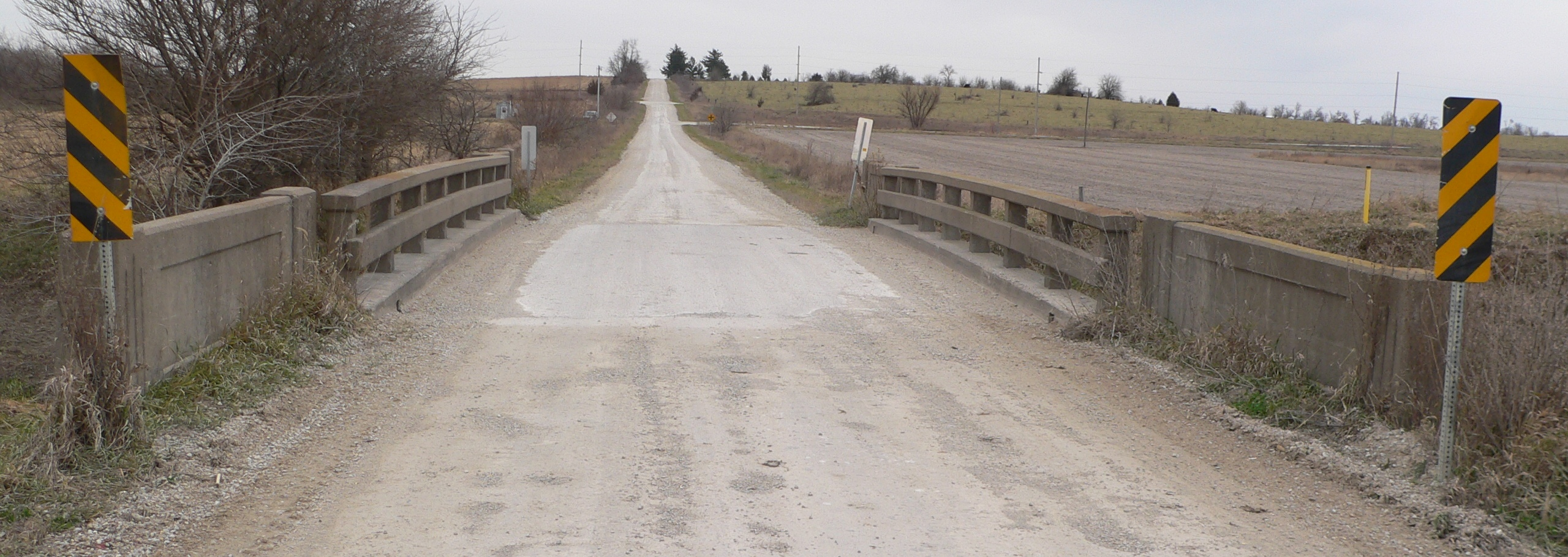
Big Slough Bridge

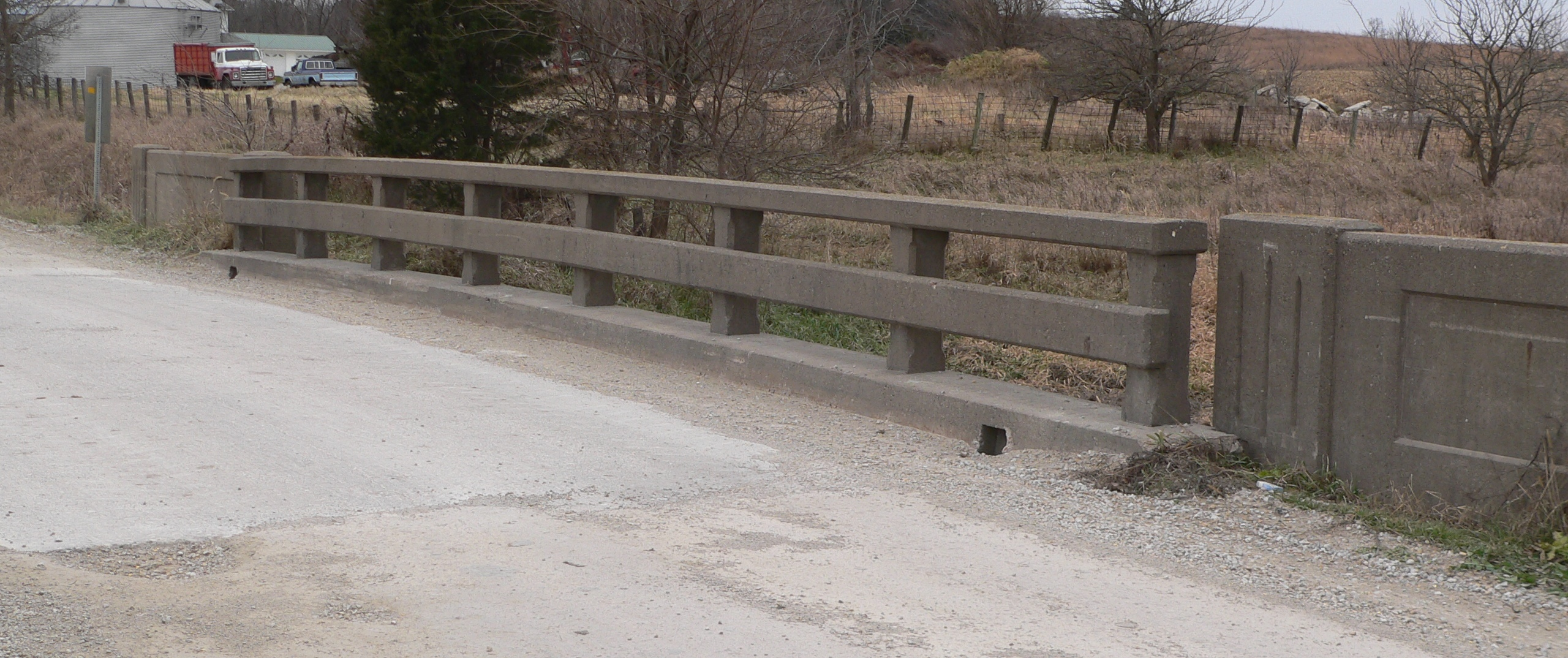
Big Slough Bridge

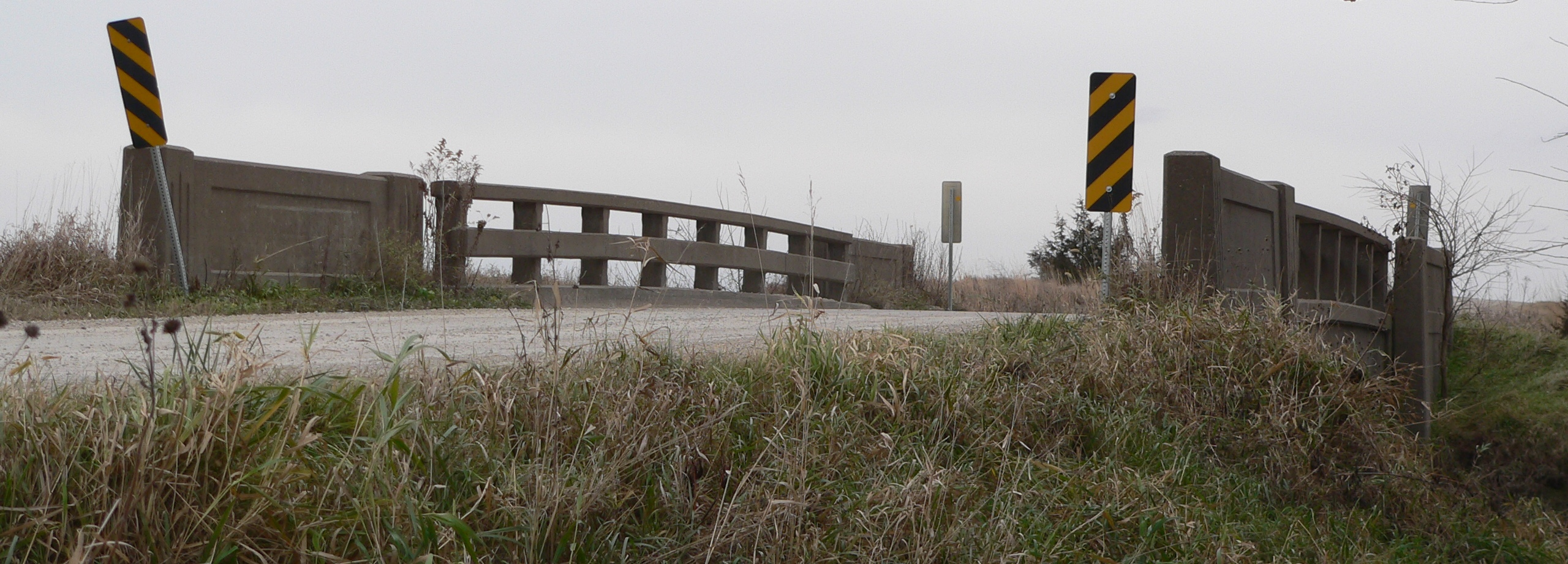
Big Slough Bridge
