= West Liberty, Iowa =

- City
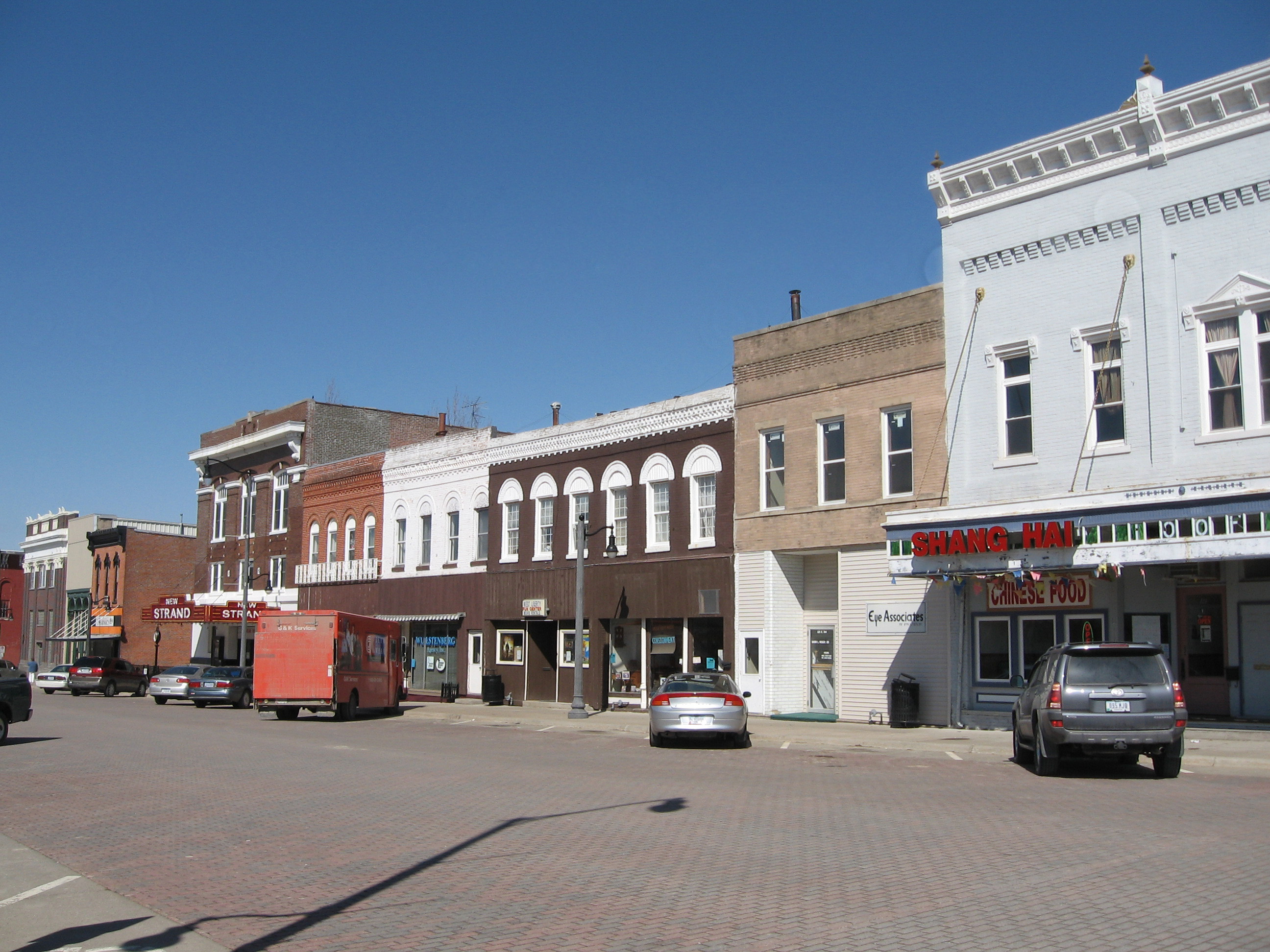
- Downtown West Liberty, Iowa
- Motto: Community of Opportunity
- Location of West Liberty, Iowa
- Coordinates: 41°34′18″N 91°15′20″W
- Country: United States
- State: Iowa
- County: Muscatine

Government
  - Mayor: Mark Smith

Area
  - Total: 1.77 sq mi (4.58 km^{2})
  - Land: 1.77 sq mi (4.58 km^{2})
  - Water: 0 sq mi (0.00 km^{2})
- Elevation: 689 ft (210 m)

Population (2020)
  - Total: 3,858
  - Density: 2,183.3/sq mi (842.97/km^{2})
- Time zone: UTC-6 (Central (CST))
  - Summer (DST): UTC-5 (CDT)
- ZIP code: 52776
- Area code: 319
- FIPS code: 19-84315
- GNIS feature ID: 2397269
- Website: cityofwestlibertyia.org

West Liberty is a city in Muscatine County, Iowa, United States. The population was 3,858 at the time of the 2020 census. It is part of the Muscatine micropolitan area.

West Liberty is located five miles south of Interstate 80 on Historic Highway 6. The city is home to the West Liberty Raceway, located in the Muscatine County Fairgrounds. The Muscatine County Fair takes place in West Liberty in July of each year.

== History ==
West Liberty was incorporated in 1868, at the junction of the Chicago, Rock Island and Pacific and Burlington, Cedar Rapids and Northern Railroads. Prior to incorporation, the town stood about a half-mile north of its current location, but was relocated to be closer to the railway. The settlement was originally called Wapsinonoc Township, which means smooth surfaced, meandering creek or stream. The name change to Liberty (after Liberty, Ohio, the former home of many of its settlers) is attributed to the wife of the township's first postmaster, Simeon A. Bagley. It is believed that the name was changed after the relocation.

== Geography ==
According to the United States Census Bureau, the city has a total area of 1.74 square miles (4.51 km^{2}), all land.

== Demographics ==
Historical populations
Year	Pop.	±%
1880	1,141	—
1890	1,268	+11.1%
1900	1,690	+33.3%
1910	1,666	−1.4%
1920	1,834	+10.1%
1930	1,679	−8.5%
1940	1,802	+7.3%
1950	1,866	+3.6%
1960	2,042	+9.4%
1970	2,296	+12.4%
1980	2,723	+18.6%
1990	2,935	+7.8%
2000	3,332	+13.5%
2010	3,736	+12.1%
2020	3,858	+3.3%
Source:"U.S. Census website". United States Census Bureau. and Iowa Data Center; Source: U.S. Decennial Census

=== 2020 census ===
As of the 2020 census, there were 3,858 people, 1,321 households, and 934 families residing in the city. The population density was 2,179.3 inhabitants per square mile (841.4/km^{2}). There were 1,399 housing units at an average density of 790.2 per square mile (305.1/km^{2}).

The median age in the city was 33.4 years, and 29.4% of residents were under the age of 18. For every 100 females, there were 92.5 males, and for every 100 females age 18 and over, there were 92.7 males age 18 and over. 32.7% of residents were under the age of 20; 6.1% were between the ages of 20 and 24; 25.4% were from 25 to 44; 22.0% were from 45 to 64; and 13.7% were 65 years of age or older.

0.0% of residents lived in urban areas, while 100.0% lived in rural areas.

Of the 1,321 households, 42.5% had children under the age of 18 living in them. Of all households, 49.4% were married-couple households, 8.2% were cohabitating-couple households, 17.8% were households with a male householder and no spouse or partner present, and 24.7% were households with a female householder and no spouse or partner present. About 29.3% of all households were non-families, 25.1% were made up of individuals, and 12.2% had someone living alone who was 65 years of age or older.

There were 1,399 housing units, of which 5.6% were vacant. The homeowner vacancy rate was 1.2% and the rental vacancy rate was 4.6%.

Racial composition as of the 2020 census
Race	Number	Percent
White	1,893	49.1%
Black or African American	21	0.5%
American Indian and Alaska Native	52	1.3%
Asian	70	1.8%
Native Hawaiian and Other Pacific Islander	0	0.0%
Some other race	1,080	28.0%
Two or more races	742	19.2%
Hispanic or Latino (of any race)	2,250	58.3%

=== 2010 census ===
As of the census of 2010, there were 3,736 people, 1,251 households, and 890 families residing in the city. The population density was 2,147.1 inhabitants per square mile (829.0/km^{2}). There were 1,316 housing units at an average density of 756.3 per square mile (292.0/km^{2}). The racial makeup of the city was 71.2% White, 0.4% African American, 0.1% Native American, 2.1% Asian, 23.3% from other races, and 3.0% from two or more races. Hispanic or Latino of any race were 52.2% of the population. West Liberty was the first town in the state of Iowa to achieve a Hispanic-majority population.

There were 1,251 households, of which 43.9% had children under the age of 18 living with them, 55.3% were married couples living together, 10.0% had a female householder with no husband present, 5.8% had a male householder with no wife present, and 28.9% were non-families. 23.2% of all households were made up of individuals, and 11.9% had someone living alone who was 65 years of age or older. The average household size was 2.94 and the average family size was 3.48.

The median age in the city was 32.8 years. 29.5% of residents were under the age of 18; 9.5% were between the ages of 18 and 24; 27.6% were from 25 to 44; 21.5% were from 45 to 64; and 12% were 65 years of age or older. The gender makeup of the city was 49.5% male and 50.5% female.

=== 2000 census ===
As of the census of 2000, there were 3,332 people, 1,150 households, and 801 families residing in the city. The population density was 2,136.4 inhabitants per square mile (824.9/km^{2}). There were 1,195 housing units at an average density of 766.2 per square mile (295.8/km^{2}). The racial makeup of the city was 67.20% White, 0.30% African American, 0.42% Native American, 3.54% Asian, 25.00% from other races, and 3.54% from two or more races. Hispanic or Latino of any race were 40.49% of the population.

There were 1,150 households, out of which 39.4% had children under the age of 18 living with them, 55.7% were married couples living together, 9.3% had a female householder with no husband present, and 30.3% were non-families. 25.1% of all households were made up of individuals, and 13.6% had someone living alone who was 65 years of age or older. The average household size was 2.84 and the average family size was 3.46.

29.8% are under the age of 18, 10.0% from 18 to 24, 31.5% from 25 to 44, 15.4% from 45 to 64, and 13.3% who were 65 years of age or older. The median age was 32 years. For every 100 females, there were 101.3 males. For every 100 females age 18 and over, there were 96.5 males.

The median income for a household in the city was $37,925, and the median income for a family was $41,667. Males had a median income of $29,963 versus $24,306 for females. The per capita income for the city was $15,420. About 4.6% of families and 7.3% of the population were below the poverty line, including 7.8% of those under age 18 and 6.5% of those age 65 or over.

== Economy ==
West Liberty is home to two major employers: The West Liberty Community School District and West Liberty Foods. West Liberty Foods is a producer of turkey products that has a meat processing facility as well as its corporate headquarters in the city. Agriculture, housing development, and agribusiness are a major factor in the local economy. The West Liberty Industrial Park is located on the south side of the city. In 2005, the Chamber of Commerce and the City of West Liberty undertook the initiative to improve area economic development with the foundation of We Lead. We Lead is a non-profit organization that partners with the City of West Liberty, Muscatine County, and local investors in carrying out their mission. In addition to the City of West Liberty, WeLead also serves the cities of Atalissa, IA and Nichols, IA.

=== Downtown revitalization ===
West Liberty's Downtown Commercial Historic District is on the National Register of Historic Places in Muscatine County, Iowa. A Downtown Task Force meets regularly to discuss the issues and needs for the downtown area. This task force works in partnership with We Lead to envision revitalization projects and implement them when possible. Recent projects include the adoption of the International Property Maintenance Code for aging downtown buildings and the establishment of a revolving loan fund for structural improvements and scholarships for facades. We Lead has begun to implement The Art-Full Community Project as a prototype for a business incubator; businesses in West Liberty display artwork, artists sell their work and donate part of the proceeds to a community economic development fund. Part of this community fund also benefits the downtown area.

== Arts and culture ==
West Liberty is a historical town with many cultural events. West Liberty has a movie theater built in 1910, an internationally known puppet theater that hosts several events throughout the year and gives frequent performances, two dance studios, an arts council which organizes community art lessons during the winter months and concerts during the summer, and various local artists. West Liberty has a historical downtown, a train depot built in 1897, and a public library constructed in 1904.

=== Festivals and events ===
West Liberty is home to the Muscatine County Fairgrounds that hosts the Muscatine County Fair, its biggest annual event, every year in July. The fair features grandstand entertainment, a carnival, a talent show, a fair queen contest, pet shows, and judging of exhibits of livestock, arts and crafts, cooking, flowers and plants, photography, and antiques. More than half of the fairground buildings are original, an exceptionally large number compared to other fairgrounds.

As a prelude to the fair every year, West Liberty holds the Fair Parade followed by Picnic in the Park, on the Sunday immediately preceding the fair. The Fair Parade features floats made by the community in keeping with that year's theme. The parade winds through town and is immediately followed by the Picnic in the Park. The Picnic in the Park is held in Kimberly Park and features a free swim, food sold by local vendors, and entertainment.

Another annual summertime event is Summer Music in the Park. This summer concert series is organized by West Liberty Area Arts Council (WLAAC) and is free to the public. Every Friday evening for about a month in the summer a concert is given by local groups in Ron-de-Voo Park. Music styles vary from blues to classic rock to Latin American folk music.

The West Liberty Children's Festival is held every year in September. A daylong event held downtown on Third Street, it is sponsored and organized by Eulenspiegel Puppet Theatre with lots of volunteer help. It includes puppet shows, crafts, activities, strolling performers, performances from the local dance studios, food from local vendors, and more. The performances and puppet shows are given by both local and out of state performers. In recent years it has coordinated with the Latino Festival, which includes several hours of live Latino music as well as Mexican food and craft vendors. The 10 AM to 10 PM event is known as Fiesta West Liberty

From April through August the West Liberty Raceway hosts races nearly every Saturday night. According to their website, the raceway is a "1/2 mile, slightly banked, dirt track". The IMCA Sport Compact, iWireless IMCA Late Models, and Performance Concepts are hosted at the raceway.

=== Museum ===
The historical Rock Island Railroad Depot, built in 1897, now serves as a museum. It contains displays of artifacts pertaining to the history of West Liberty and the history of the railway. Heritage Park, or the Depot Campus as it is commonly known, serves as a museum of sorts. The area immediately surrounding the depot has become the final resting place for many local pieces of history. There is a restored Rock Island Lines Caboose, a local barn known as the Heritage Barn along with antique farm equipment, a tourist cabin that used to form part of the North Point complex, which in addition to the nine cabins also consisted of a diner and a service station, a one-room schoolhouse also known as the Swamp School, and a steam locomotive. There are also efforts to restore a Stagecoach Inn (The Beers and St. John Company Coach Inn), which was previously located near Highway 6, and was moved to the Heritage Park in 2024.

=== Library ===
The West Liberty Public Library building was constructed in 1904 with the help of a $7500 grant from Andrew Carnegie. Before that, the library can be traced back to its beginning as a temperance library. After the Reading Room was closed, seven women continued circulating the books until they left the handling of the library to the Peoples Library Association 5 years later. The association opened a reading room and later, in the year 1900, the community voted to approve the establishment of a public library. The West Liberty Public Library building is listed as a State Historical Building and has been renovated and expanded various times over the years with the latest repairs and renovations occurring in 2012–2013. The library holds a host of activities throughout the year including summer reading programs, screenings of educational movies, toddler story times, a morning coffee book club, and much more.

== Education ==
The West Liberty Community School District (WLCSD) consists of elementary, middle, and high schools. Construction of a new high school was completed in 2004. A new middle school was opened in 2009 with a combination of new construction and extensive renovations of parts of the old high school. The school district serves over 1220 students with a student/teacher ratio of 11/1. West Liberty High School was ranked Eighth (#8) Best High School in Iowa, according to the US News "Best High Schools 2013 Rankings."

=== Dual Language Program ===
"The West Liberty Elementary, Middle School, and High School are all International Spanish Academies (ISAs)". which offer students the opportunity to earn one of the Diplomas de Español como Lengua Extranjera awarded by the Instituto Cervantes. International Spanish Academies are recognized by the Ministry of Education and the Government of Spain. The WLCSD Dual language Program allows students to take all of their classes in both Spanish and English, increasing their bilingual skills and their understanding of another culture through language immersion. Students enter the program in pre-kindergarten and parents make a commitment on behalf of their child and themselves to participate in the program through fifth grade.

The WLCSD Dual Language Program was the first of its kind in the State of Iowa. It began in the fall of 1997 when the district received a five-year $1.7 million federal grant from the United States Department of Education. After a year of planning and model analysis, the program was implemented in the fall of 1998 at the pre-kindergarten and kindergarten grade levels. From 1999 through 2002, the district added grade levels as the first class advanced through each grade. In the spring of 2011, the first graduating class of Seniors marked the final establishment of the dual language program in all K-12 grade levels.

== Parks and recreation ==
There are eight city parks scattered throughout West Liberty, varying in size and purpose from a veterans memorial to a public pool to a sports complex complete with softball and baseball diamonds, soccer fields, a skatepark, and more. The city parks are:

- Dutton Park
- Friendship Park
- Railroad Park
- Ron-De-Voo Park
- Sesquincentennial Park
- Veterans Memorial Park
- Wapsie Park
- Kimberly Park

In addition to the parks, West Liberty maintains a portion of the Hoover Nature Trail. The portion of the trail in West Liberty starts at the depot and continues north to Highway 6.

West Liberty is home to the West Liberty Golf & Country Club, featuring a nine-hole golf course and a restaurant. The country club hosts a variety of events, including tournaments.

The West Liberty Gun Club is a shooting range on the southwest edge of town. It has an outdoor range, an archery range, and a trap range. It holds matches for anyone, from beginners to more experienced shooters. The club has about 150 members.

== Media ==
The West Liberty Index, the local newspaper for the town of West Liberty, has been in operation since 1868. It covers a variety of local news including news from the nearby towns of Nichols and Atalissa. The West Liberty Public Library has a collection of microfilm copies of the paper from the years 1878 through 1946.

== Community engagement ==
Many community service organizations are active within the community, including the local Lions Club, Rotary Club, West Liberty Area Arts Council, P.E.O, Aquarius Club, and the local chapter of the League of United Latin American Citizens (LULAC).

== Utilities ==
West Liberty receives its telephone, cable, and internet services from the local telephone company Liberty Communications. West Liberty has high speed access to the internet through a fiber optic network.

The town's water, electric, and sewer are all provided through the city. West Liberty generates its own electricity and is one of 64 municipal electric utilities in the State of Iowa with that capability. Garbage pickup is taken care of by the city's solid waste department. The solid waste department also provides a recycling center, dumpster rental, appliance removal for a fee, and yard waste pickup.

== Notable people ==
- Horace E. Deemer, chief justice of the Iowa Supreme Court
- Samuel W. Koster, U.S. Army general involved with the My Lai massacre
- Dorothy Lonewolf Miller, Blackfoot activist involved with the occupation of Alcatraz Island
- Sara E. Morse, public official in Montana
