= Frances Dickinson (physician) =

American physician and humanitarian worker

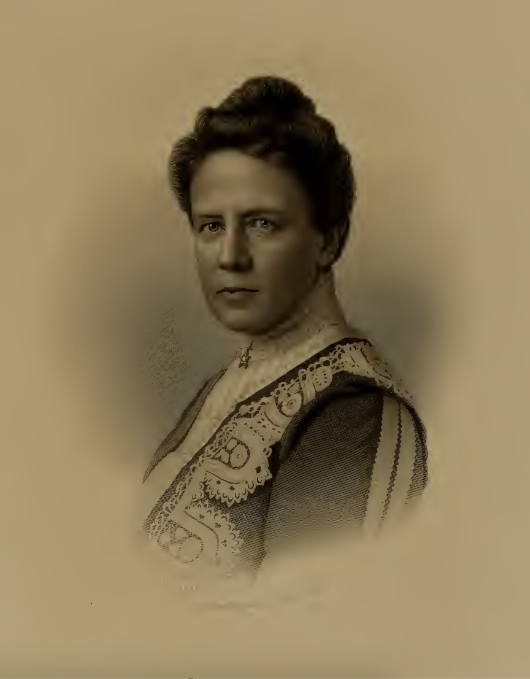
- Born: January 19, 1856; Chicago, Illinois, U.S.
- Died: May 19, 1945 (aged 89); Orange City, Florida, U.S.
- Resting place: Rosehill Cemetery
- Education: Northwestern University Woman's Medical School; Illinois Eye and Ear Infirmary; Royal Ophthalmic Hospital at Moorfields; Royal Free Hospital; Mary Thompson Hospital; Cook County Hospital
- Occupations: Physician, clubwoman, writer, speaker
- Relatives: Susan B. Anthony (niece)

Frances Dickinson (January 19, 1856 – May 19, 1945) was an American physician and clubwoman who specialized in ophthalmology. Dickinson was the first woman received into the International Medical Congress (1887). In addition to being an active member of several medical societies, she was also a prominent woman's club participant, philanthropist, writer, and speaker.

Dickinson graduated from Northwestern University Woman's Medical School in Evanston, Illinois in 1883. She completed special courses in ophthalmology at Illinois Eye and Ear Infirmary, Royal Ophthalmic Hospital at Moorfields, London, and Royal Free Hospital, London. She spent five months in Darmstadt, Germany, in 1884, under the private tutorship of Geheimrat Adolf Weber. In 1882, she Interned at Mary Thompson Hospital, and was an Alternate interne at Cook County Hospital through the first examination open to women, in 1883. Dickinson held various positions during her career, including as ophthalmic surgeon to Mary Thompson Hospital; President and Dean of Harvey Medical College for ten years; Professor of ophthalmology and of angiology, Harvey Medical College; Professor of ophthalmology, Post-Graduate Medical College, Chicago.

== Early life and education ==
Frances (nickname, "Fannie") Dickinson was born in Chicago on January 19, 1856. She was the daughter of Albert Franklin and Ann Eliza (Anthony) Dickinson. Her father died in 1881. Dickinson's siblings included two sisters, Hannah (Mrs. Charles C. Boyles) and Melissa, and three brothers, Albert, Nathan and Charles. The brothers developed The Albert Dickinson Company of Chicago, which was the leading firm dealing in grass seeds around the world.

=== Ancestry ===
Many of Dickinson's maternal ancestors were physicians, and her paternal ancestors included a number of schoolmasters; and in both lines, ancestors frequently held public office. The Dickinsons came originally from Wales. Frances' grandfather, Samuel Dickinson, was the schoolmaster in his town, and one of the selectmen. Her father, Albert F. Dickinson, was a prominent business man in Chicago for many years, and from him, Frances received every encouragement when she announced her intention of joining the medical profession, for which he deemed women especially fitted. Dickinson's mother, Ann Eliza Anthony, was a native of Massachusetts, and was active in charitable work throughout her life. She was one of the organizers of the First Society of Friends in Chicago and was an aunt of the suffragist Susan B. Anthony.

The first of the Anthony family of whom there is any record is William Anthony, who was born in Cologne, Germany, and came to England during the reign of Edward VI. He was made Chief Engraver of the Royal Mint and Master of the Scales, continuing to hold that office through the reign of Mary I, and part of the reign of Elizabeth I. Anthony's crest and coat of arms were entered in the royal enumeration. Dickinson is a descendant of his son Derrick, who was the father of Dr. Francis Anthony, born in London in 1550. He graduated from the University of Cambridge with the degree of Master of Arts, and became famous as a physician and chemist. He was in continual conflict with the College of Physicians and Surgeons. Francis Anthony had a daughter and two sons, both of whom became distinguished as physicians, and John, the elder son, founded the American branch of the family. His son, John Anthony, Jr., born in Hempstead, England, sailed for America in the ship Hercules on April 16, 1634, at the age of 27. He settled in Portsmouth, Rhode Island, where he was a landowner, innkeeper and public official. He had five children and 43 children, among whom was Abraham. Abraham Anthony had thirteen children, one of whom, William Anthony, Jr., had four children, among whom was David. David married Judith Hicks, and they moved from Dartmouth, Massachusetts, and then to Berkshire, Massachusetts, settling near the Adams foot of Mount Greylock. They had nine children, of whom Humphrey Anthony, the second son, born February 2, 1770, at Dartmouth, Massachusetts, was the father of Ann Eliza Anthony, mother of Frances Dickinson.

In her youth, Dickinson was associated with Methodism, being an active worker in the Centenary Methodist Episcopal Church.

=== Education ===
Dickinson received her early education in the public schools of Chicago, graduating from the Central High School in 1875. Dicksinon worked as a public school teacher for four years before deciding to pursue a career in medicine. During her last year as a teacher, she attended a course of lectures on physiology given by Dr. Sarah Hackett Stevenson at the Chicago Woman's Medical College, with the original purpose of qualifying herself to teach physiology. However, she soon decided to take a complete course in medicine and reportedly received warm support from her family. In 1880, she matriculated at the Woman's Medical College of Chicago, graduating with honors in 1883.

Dickinson served as intern in the Women's and Children's Hospital, under Dr. Mary Harris Thompson. Having decided to specialize in ophthalmology, she took a course in othalmology at the Illinois State Eye and Ear Infirmary in Chicago. Dickinson concluded to continue her studies farther before entering upon independent practice.

In the fall of 1883, Dickinson went abroad with her brother, spending fourteen months as student and tourist in Scotland, England, France, Algiers, Tunis, Sicily, Switzerland and Germany. In London, she studied under the surgeon, Dr. Cooper, in the Royal Ophthalmic Hospital at Moorfields, and also attended the ophthalmic clinics at the Royal Free Hospital, in Gray's Inn Road. While in Darmstadt, Germany, she was, for five months, under the private tutorship of Dr. Adolf Weber, who had a large private clinic and hospital of sixty beds attached to his home.

== Career ==
Upon her return to Chicago, Dickinson was active in the practice of ophthalmology, quickly gaining prominence in her field. She was considered the leading woman practitioner in her specialty in the western world. At one time, she enjoyed the distinction of being the only woman engaged as a post-graduate instructor in Ophthalmology, filling that chair in the Chicago Post-Graduate School of Medicine. For some time, she was Secretary of Harvey Medical College, a co-educational institution, and later served as its President, where she also filled the Chair of Ophthalmology.

Dickinson was an active member of the City and State Medical Societies, as well as the American Medical Association, the Chicago Ophthalmological Society, the American Academy of Political and Social Science, and the Chicago Academy of Sciences. She was the first woman received into the International Medical Congress, in which she was admitted to membership at its ninth convention, held in 1887, at Washington, D.C. Prior to 1887, women has been denied membership, in spite of the fact that the congresses were held in foreign cities where women were not allowed equal privileges with men at the universities.

Apart from her professional success, Dickinson ranked among the progressive women of the day for intellectual vigor displayed in her association with various good works. Her many philanthropic interests received the same attention as she gave to her regular professional work.

During the World's Columbian Exposition, Dickinson was a member of the board of lady managers. She and Waite, were the originators of the Queen Isabella Association, which was formed for the purpose of commemorating the labors of Queen Isabella in assisting and encouraging Christopher Columbus. The material result of their work was the statue executed by Harriet Hosmer.

Dickinson and Waite were also associated in another work of practical benefit. At the time of the Johnstown Flood, they formed the first medical union composed of women of the various schools of medicine, the Illinois Medical Women's Sanitary Association, which sent Drs. Katharine Bushnell, Alice Ewing, and later Rachel Hickey, to the scene of the disaster. They were among the first on the ground to commence the work of relief, and remained there seven weeks.

She was an author of articles and pamphlets on Refraction, Education of Adults at Night, College Entrance Requirements, Fundamentals of Education, Organization, Vocational Education, Complete College and University Courses for Adults in the Evening, Pedagogy in Medical Schools.

While in Chicago, Dickinson lived at the Auditorium Hotel.

== Clubwoman ==
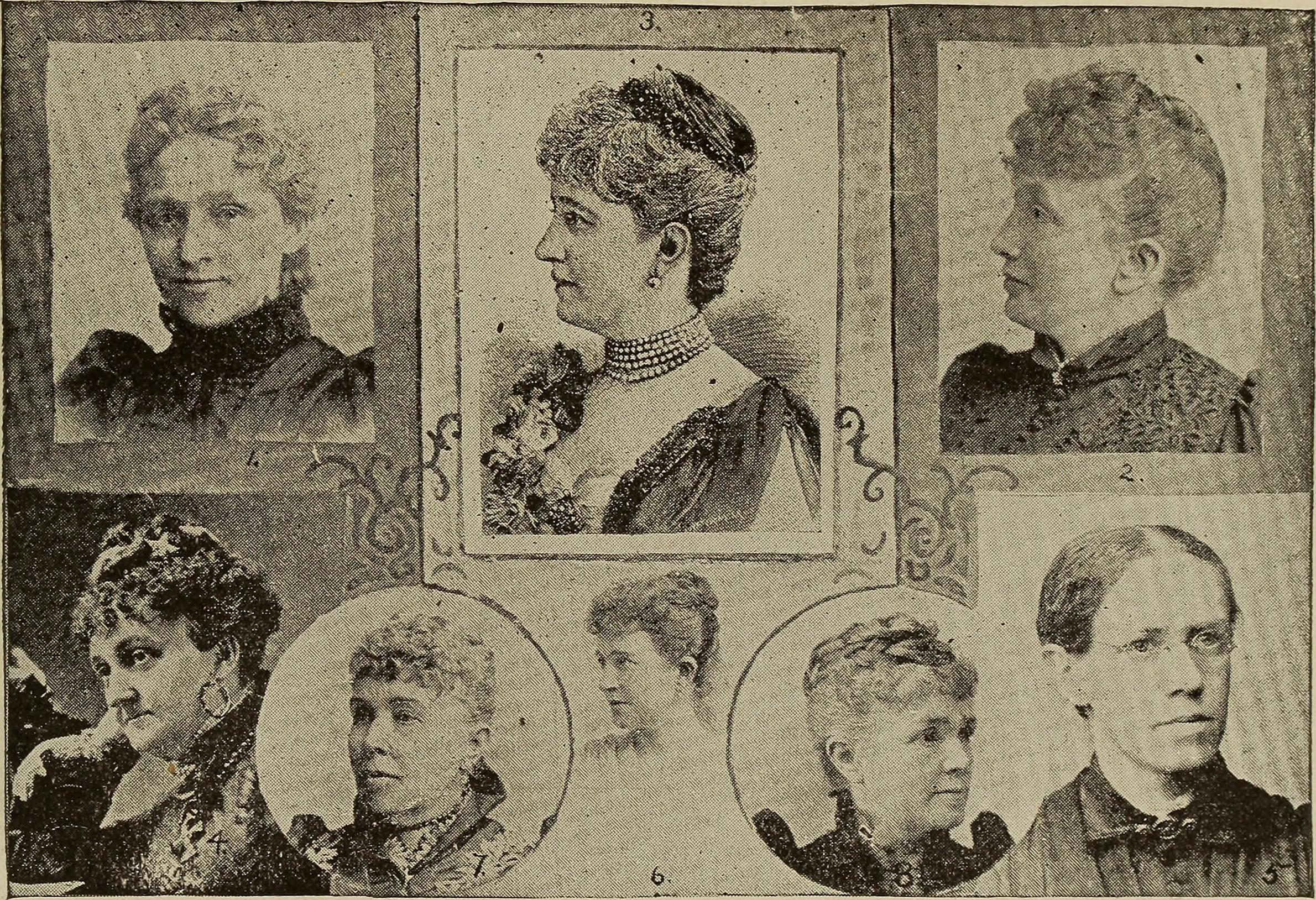
Dickinson (bottom right). Board of Lady Managers, World's Columbian Exposition. (1893)

Dickinson served on the Member Board of Lady Managers, World's Columbian Exposition, Chicago, 1892-93. She was a Member of Chicago Physicians' Club, American Medical Association, Chicago Ophthalmological Society, Ninth International Medical Congress of Physicians and Surgeons, meeting at Washington in 1887 and first woman to be admitted to this International organization. Member of Chicago Woman's Club since 1886. She was a delegate to General Federation of Women's Clubs in 1900 at Milwaukee and in 1902, at Los Angeles, California.

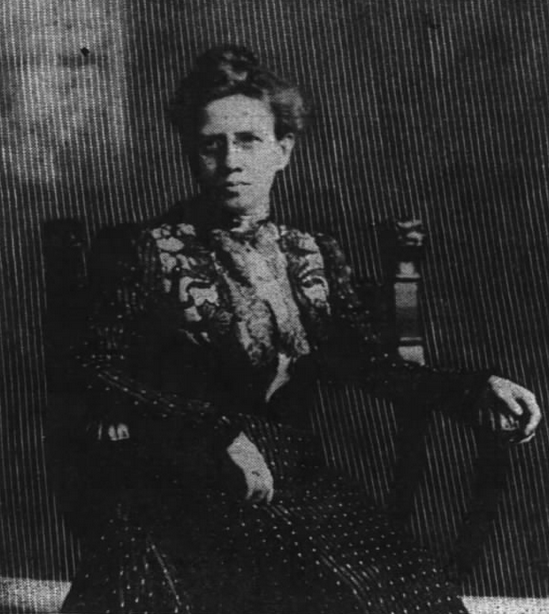
1902

Dickinson also served as President of Social Economics Club for five successive years. In 1902, while in that role, she proposed making a study of marriage customs of all nations, of all times, hoping thus to cope with the problems of the times. She stated, "When people marry, they should have two contracts -- one to satisfy the demands of the church and the other a contract just among themselves. In it each should agree to release the other whenever called upon to do so." She was a Member of American Association of Political Science; National Educational Association; Women's Medical Club; National Vocational Association; Women's Federal Labor Union No. 2703, 1887; Illinois Woman's Alliance (first delegated body of women in Chicago); Medical Women's Sanitary Association (first organization of physicians from all schools of medicine); member of the International Medical Woman's Congress at Chicago, 1893; Secretary Queen Isabella Association, World's Fair, Chicago; and Trustee Chicago Academy of Sciences. She was elected president of the Artcraft Institute Guild in 1914.

== Later life ==
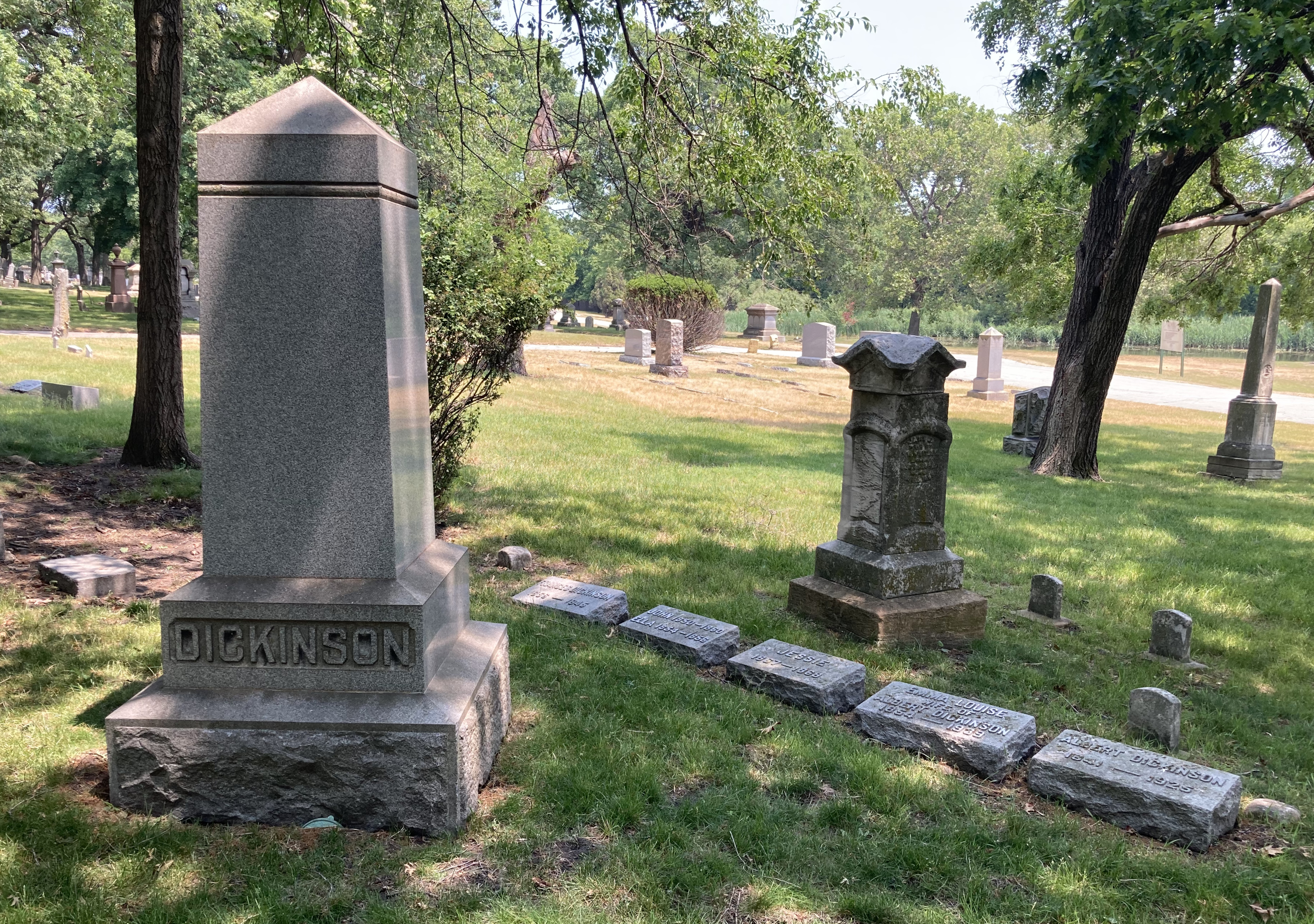
Dickinson's grave at Rosehill Cemetery

In 1906, in need to recuperate her health after a severe strain of overwork in Chicago, Dickinson removed to Florida. She was instrumental in opening a new field of commerce for the U.S. by inducing the Federal government to establish the camphor experiment station of the United States Department of Agriculture at Orange City. Her brother, Albert Dickinson, of Chicago, gave US$50,000 in 1908 for the establishment of the station. Her homestead in Orange City was named, "Aranoana Lodge".

In July 1923, Dickinson was a delegate to the National Woman's Party conference in Seneca Falls, New York where the proposed Equal Rights Amendment was presented by Alice Paul. Dickinson, a cousin of Susan B. Anthony seconded the proposal.

Dickinson was instrumental in the founding of the Orange City Colored School in 1927.

Dickinson died in Orange City, May 19, 1945. She was buried at Rosehill Cemetery in Chicago.
