= Adolf Weber =

Adolf Weber may refer to:

- Adolf Weber (ophthalmologist) (1829–1915), German ophthalmologist
- Adolphe "Adolf" Erwin Weber (1863–1948), Swiss-American missionary with the Bible Student Movement in Europe
- Adolf Weber (economist) (1876–1963), German economist
- Adolf Vécsey (1915–1979), Hungarian football player, also known as Adolf Weber
