= William Heath Byford =

American gynecologist (1817–1890)

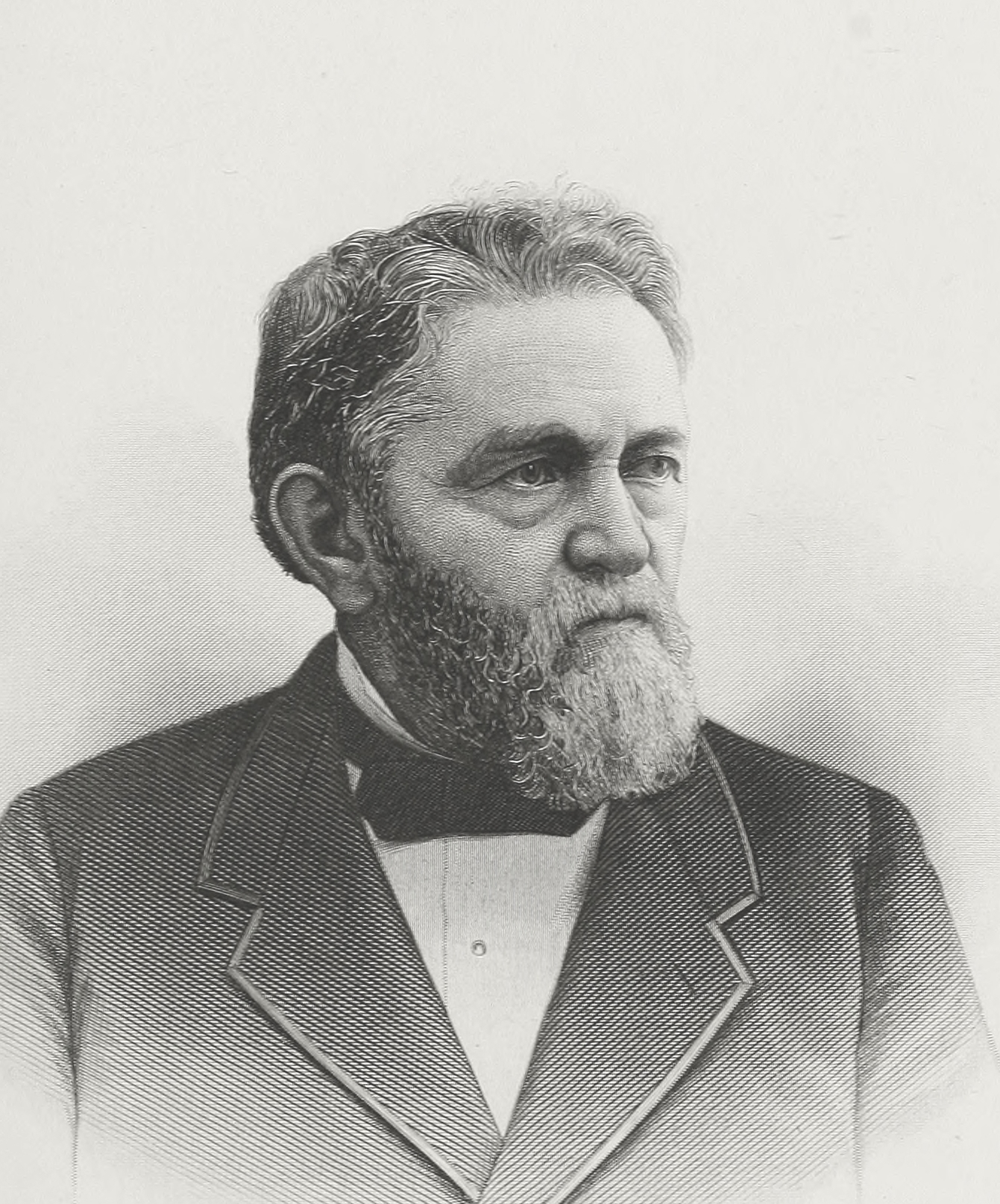
- Born: March 20, 1817; Eaton, Ohio U.S.
- Died: May 21, 1890 (aged 73); Chicago, Illinois, U.S.
- Resting place: Graceland Cemetery
- Education: Medical College of Ohio (M.D.)
- Known for: Founding the Chicago Medical College and Woman's Medical College of Chicago
- Spouses: Mary Anne Holland (m. 1840; died 1865) Lina W. Flersheim (m. 1873)
- Children: 4, including Anna Byford Leonard
- Scientific career
- Fields: Obstetrics; Gynaecology
- Workplaces: Evansville Medical College (Evansville) (1849–1854); Rush Medical College (Chicago) (1857–1859); Chicago Medical College (Chicago) (1859–1879); Rush Medical College (Chicago) (1879–1890)
- Academic advisors: Joseph Maddox

Signature
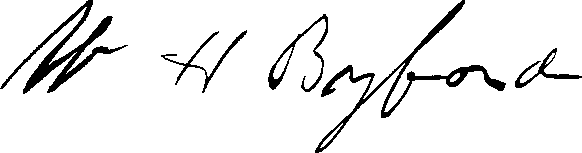

William Heath Byford (March 20, 1817 – May 21, 1890) was an American medical doctor, surgeon, gynecologist and advocate of medical education for women who was most notable for founding the Chicago Medical College and Woman's Medical College of Chicago.

Byford was born in Eaton, Ohio. After graduating from the Medical College of Ohio, he served on multiple chairs at the Evansville Medical College and Rush Medical College. In 1859, after he quit from Rush, he founded the Chicago Medical College along with his colleagues, where he also received the chair of obstetrics.

He founded the Chicago Hospital for Women and Children alongside Mary Harris Thompson, and later helped her graduate after being rejected by Rush due to her sex. The same year he financially aided Thompson in founding the Woman's Medical College of Chicago where he became president of the faculty and Board of Trustees.

Alongside others, Byford founded the American Gynecological Society in 1876, where he served as vice-president, and later as president in 1881. After Rush created a chair of gynaecology specifically for Byford, he returned to the faculty where he remained until his death in 1890 following an attack of angina pectoris.

== Early life and education ==
Byford was born on March 20, 1817, in Eaton to Henry T. Byford, a mechanic, and Hannah Swain; he was the eldest of three children. His ancestors originated in Suffolk in England.

Shortly after his birth, Byford's family moved to New Albany in southwest Indiana. His father died nine years later, which left Byford having to work multiple jobs to provide for the family. Eventually they moved to his maternal grandfather's farm in Crawford County. To further support his family, Byford apprenticed with a tailor in Palestine, Illinois, whom he called "a kind-hearted Christian gentleman by the name of Davis". After two years Byford left the shop and finished his apprenticeship at Vincennes, where he served for four more years.

While apprenticed, Byford borrowed books and devoted his spare time to study in fields such as chemistry, physiology, and natural history, and learned Latin, Greek and French. After his apprenticeship, in 1837, Byford was taken into the office of Joseph Maddox, whom after eighteen months, impressed by his progress, suggested him to appear before the state's three-man examining board. After his qualifications were approved by the board, he chose the town of Owensville and started his practice on August 8, 1838.

After two years of his practices in Owensville, Byford moved to Mount Vernon where he associated with Hezekiah Holland, and married his daughter, Mary Anne Holland, on October 3, 1840. Byford continued to acquire experience, and attended lectures at the Medical College of Ohio where he graduated as Doctor of Medicine in 1845.

== Career ==
=== 1849–1859 professorships at Evansville and Rush ===
In October, 1850, Byford was invited to take the chair of anatomy at the Evansville Medical College, and moved there. After two years, he was moved to the chair of theory and practice of medicine, in which he remained until the college went defunct in 1854. Byford became a member of the American Medical Association in 1854, and was made a special committee on scrofula. On the subject of scrofula, Byford prepared an elaborate and valuable report, in which he talked about the importance of physical and mental exercise, which gained him widespread attention and added to his growing reputation, which led to him being made vice-president of the association in May, 1857.

In the fall of that year, Byford was discovered by Rush Medical College due to his publications, and was asked to join their faculty as professor of obstetrics and diseases of women and children, succeeding the former professor John Evans, who later became the Governor of Colorado due to his shift to politics.

=== 1859–1879 founding of institutions ===
Byford first showed his longtime interest in physical examination, when he published a paper called "Advantages of the Prone Position in Examining the Foetal Circulation as a Diagnostic Sign of Pregnancy" in 1858. A year later, Byford resigned from Rush after they refused to improve their curriculum. He then, in the same year, along with his colleagues Hosmer Johnson, Nathan Smith Davis, Ralph Isham, Edmund Andrews and David Rutter, founded the Chicago Medical College where he received the chair of obstetrics. In 1860, Byford also performed the first ovariotomy in Chicago, later detailing the procedure of the surgery in a book he wrote.

Byford played a substantial role in the founding of the Chicago Hospital for Women and Children, in 1865, alongside Mary Harris Thompson, whom he provided financial, professional, and psychological support. Due to his contributions, the hospital was popularly known as the "Dr. Byford's Hospital" until it was renamed the "Mary Thompson Hospital" upon the sudden death of Thompson in 1895.

Five years later, when Thompson was feeling the need for further medical education, she applied to Rush but was rejected due to her sex. Following this, Byford urged the Chicago Medical College to admit her along with three other women, leading Thompson to receive her second Doctor of Medicine degree in 1870. The same year, Byford financially aided Thompson to establish the Woman's Medical College of Chicago and became president of the faculty, as well as the board of trustees, and held both positions until his death. Byford also, alongside others, founded the American Gynecological Society in 1876, of which he was elected vice-president and president in 1881. When Rush created a chair of gynecology specifically for Byford in 1879, he returned to the college and held the position until his death.

== Later life and death ==
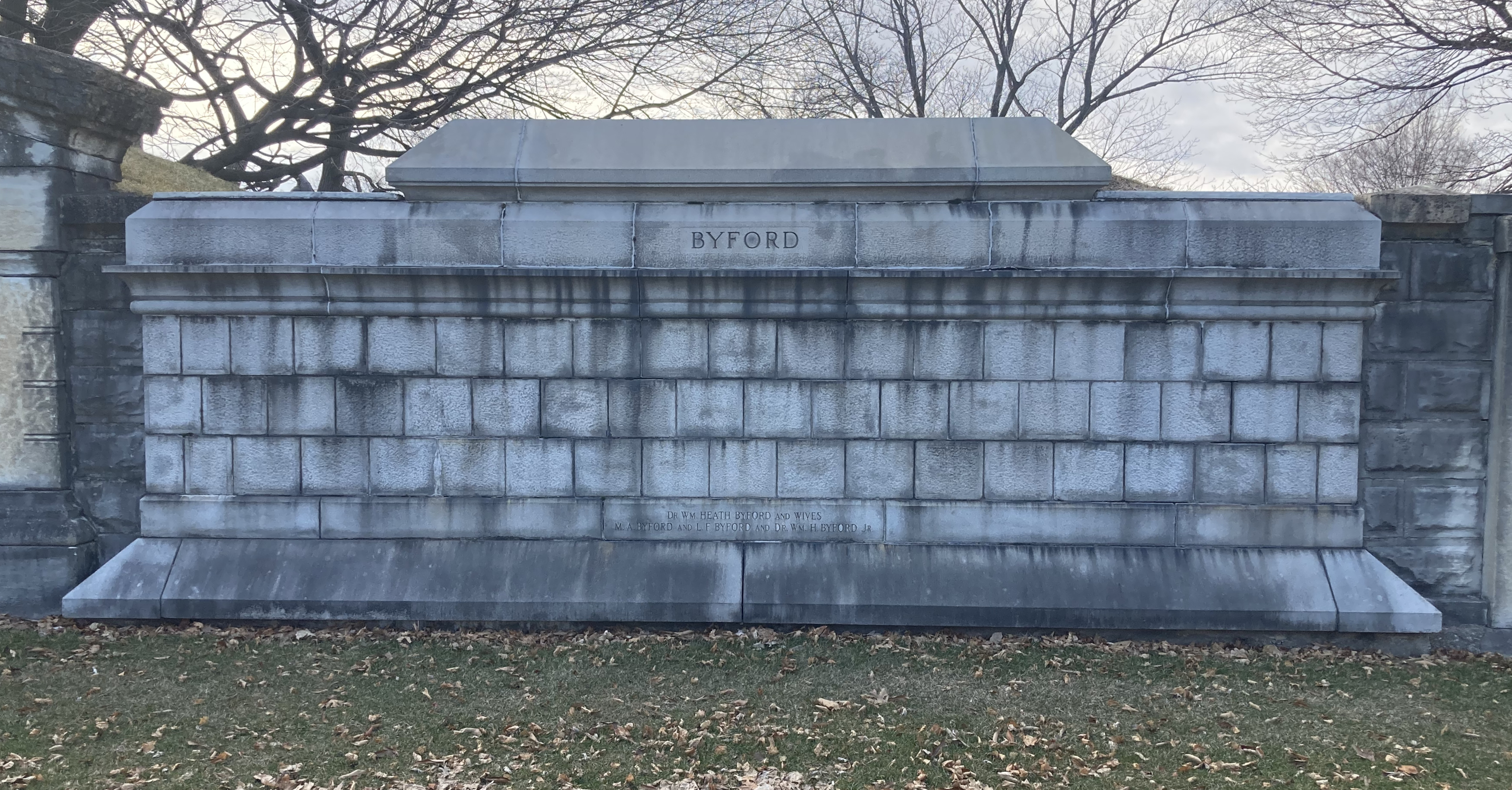
Byford's grave at Graceland Cemetery

Three days before his death he performed a laparotomy, and on May 21, 1890, Byford succumbed to an attack of angina pectoris. He was buried at Graceland Cemetery in Chicago.

Nathan Smith Davis, a friend of Byford, said in his eulogy:

The late William Heath Byford of Chicago is the best example of a literally self-educated man, who attained a deservedly high reputation as a medical practitioner, teacher and writer, as well as a man of honor, integrity and of humanity, with whom I have been acquainted. He spent nearly all the years usually allotted to school education in diligent labor to aid in supporting a widowed mother and family. From his ninth to his twenty-first year of age he was thus employed. Yet through it all he managed to obtain the necessary books, and perseveringly devoted his evenings, odd hours, and rainy days to their study. Thereby he came to legal age with a better practical education, including both Greek and Latin, than is possessed by many of the graduates of our High Schools. Then he studied medicine, and entering upon practice he advanced step by step until he reached an honorable position among the most highly honored of his profession. He was a persevering supporter of whatever tended to the elevation of medical education and the practical usefulness of the profession. The prominent traits of his character were simplicity and kindness, clearness of perception and practical application, with an unyielding perseverance in the pursuit of whatever he deemed attainable and right.

== Works cited ==
- Ridenbaugh, Mary Young (1897). Biography of Ephraim McDowell, M.D., "the father of ovariotomy". New York: McDowell Pub. Co. pp. 9–14. ISBN 978-1-28961-582-6.
- Sperry, F. M (1904). A group of distinguished physicians and surgeons of Chicago; a collection of biographical sketches of many of the eminent representatives, past and present, of the medical profession of Chicago. Chicago: J.H. Beers & co. pp. 10–14. ISBN 978-1-36319-725-5.
- Lucas, Carter (1922). History of medicine and surgery and physicians and surgeons of Chicago. Chicago: Biographical Publishing Corporation. pp. 51–53. ISBN 978-1-23653-114-8.
- Mergler, Marie J. (1896). Woman's Medical School, Northwestern University : (Woman's Medical College of Chicago) : the institution and its founders, class histories, 1870-1896. Chicago: H. G. Cutler. pp. 54–61. ISBN 978-0-34433-814-4.
- Beatty, William K. (2000) [1999]. "Byford, William Heath (1817-1890), gynecologist and advocate of medical education for women". Byford, William Heath. Oxford University Press. doi:10.1093/anb/9780198606697.article.1200133. ISBN 978-0-19-860669-7.
- "History of Northwestern University Feinberg School of Medicine" (PDF). Feinberg School of Medicine. Archived from the original (PDF) on January 23, 2023.
- Fine, Eve (2005) [2004]. "Mary Thompson Hospital". Electronic Encyclopedia of Chicago. University of Chicago Press.
- Byford, William Heath (1865). The Practice of Medicine and Surgery: Applied to the Diseases and Accidents Incident to Women. Philadelphia: Lindsay & Blakiston. pp. 553–665.
