= Adah McMahan =

American doctor, suffragist and philanthropist

Adah McMahan (January 12, 1869 – June 24, 1942) was an American doctor, suffragist and philanthropist who served as a physician during World War I. She founded the Women's Overseas Hospital alongside members of the American Medical Women's Association, and volunteered in France. She advocated for municipal suffrage and would go on to fund an annual scholarship context for women over the age of twenty at Indiana University, her Alma mater.

== Early life and education ==
McMahan was born on January 12, 1869, in Huntingburg, Indiana, to parents William Reed, a doctor, and Elizabeth Louise Helfrich McMahan. She graduated with a Bachelors of Arts in 1889, and her Masters of Arts in 1893, both from Indiana University. After a brief stint as a school teacher, she would return to Indiana University School of Medicine to begin her M.D, and would later transfer to the Women's Medical School of Northwestern University to graduate in 1857.

== Career ==
After graduating with her M.D, McMahan moved to Lafayette, Indiana, where she opened her medical practice, the Martha Home, which specialized in treating women's and children's' diseases.

She was an advocate for municipal suffrage, the appointment of women to municipal positions, and played an instrumental role in the appointment of a woman to the Lafayette School Board. She was politically active in Tippecanoe County, and greater Indiana, especially as one of the thirteen local women who held key leadership roles in the following three organisations: the Lafayette Charity Organization Society (LCOS), which would work to replace all-volunteer corps with professional social workers; the Free Kindergarten and Industrial School Association (FKISA); and the Martha Home.

Women doctors were only permitted to assist the World War I effort if they volunteered as nurses. In response, McMahan and other doctors from the American Women's Medical Association created the Women's Overseas Hospital and assisted at the French government. On, August 31, 1918, McMahan began a stint at the Cempuis Military Hospital for Gassed Men and later worked at the Épinal-Vosges. She was discharged on April 28, 1919.

== Publications ==
The Community's Duty to the Child, 1916
