= Wilton Commercial Historic District =

Historic district in Iowa, United States

- U.S. National Register of Historic Places
- U.S. Historic district
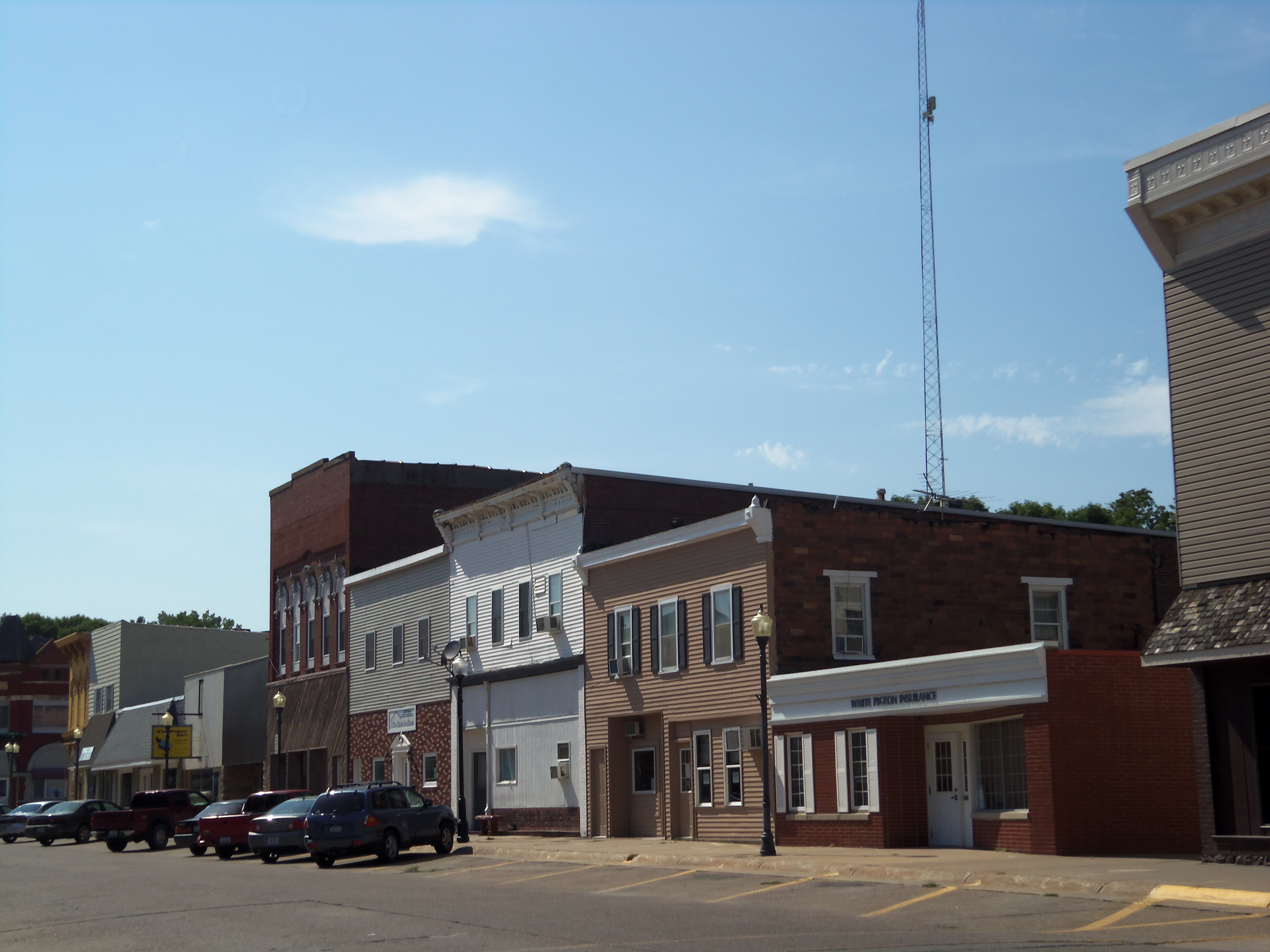

- Location within Iowa Location within the United States
- Location: Roughly bounded by 4th, E. & W. Cedar, Railroad E. & W. & Chestnut Sts., Wilton, Iowa
- Coordinates: 41°35′19.5″N 91°01′01.1″W
- Area: 11 acres (4.5 ha)
- Architectural style: Late Victorian; Late 19th & 20th Century Revivals
- NRHP reference No.: 16000606
- Added to NRHP: September 12, 2016

The Wilton Commercial Historic District is a nationally recognized historic district located in Wilton, Iowa, United States. It was listed on the National Register of Historic Places in 2016. At the time of its nomination it consisted of 47 resources, which included 32 contributing buildings, one contributing structure and 14 non-contributing buildings. Wilton got its start when the Mississippi and Missouri Railroad, later the Chicago, Rock Island and Pacific, was surveyed through this area in 1853. It was named for Wilton, Maine, the hometown of one of the founders.

This historic district covers the town's central business district. The buildings were built between 1856 and 1966. Most are attached, two stories tall, a single storefront wide, with exteriors composed of brick. There are a few wood-frame buildings. The buildings on the edges of the district are generally detached. Architecturally, the buildings tend to favor the vernacular forms with influences from the Victorian and revival styles. For the most part, first floors are still occupied with retail establishments and second floors with professional offices or apartments. Civic buildings include the WPA-funded city hall (1939), and the mid-century modern post office (1960). The Wilton Candy Kitchen (1856), the oldest building in the district, and the Chicago, Rock Island & Pacific Depot (1898) are individually listed on the National Register of Historic Places.
