= Mary Ryerson Butin =

American physician (1857–1944)

Dr. Mary Ryerson Butin M.D.
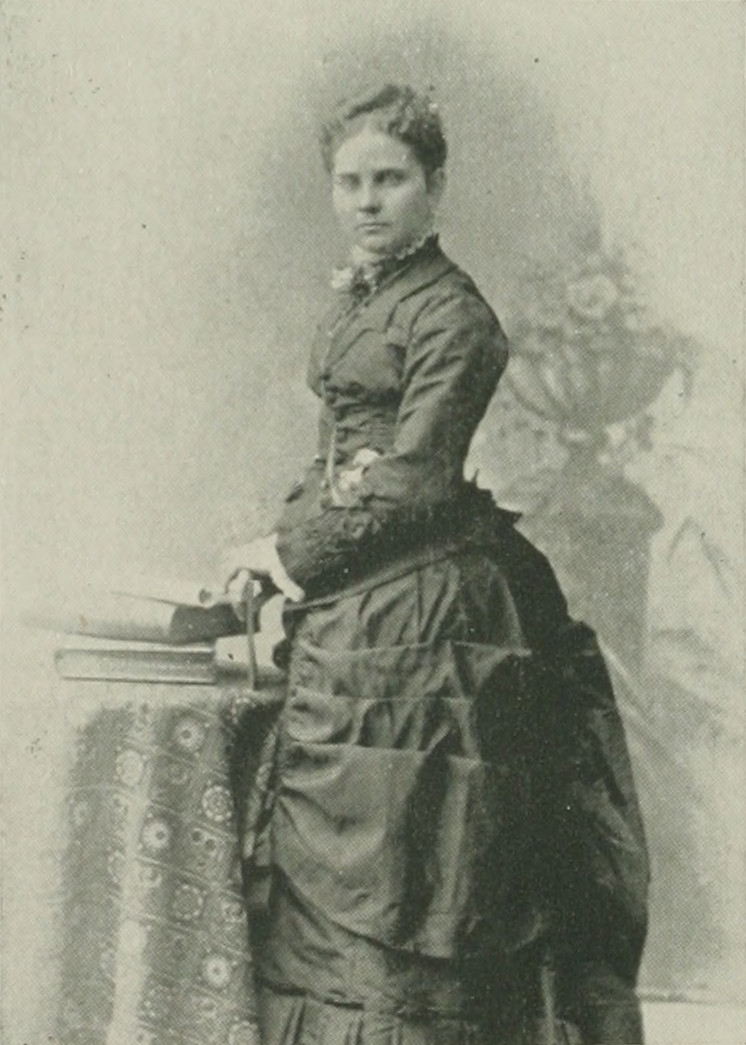
- Portrait from A Woman of the Century
- Born: Mary Eva Ryerson; August 17, 1857; Wilton, Iowa, U.S.
- Died: March 30, 1944 (aged 76); Madera, California, U.S.
- Spouse: Dr. John L. Butin (m. 1883; died 1933)

Mary Ryerson Butin (1857–1944) was an American physician. She was the first woman to join the Nebraska State Medical Society.

== Early life and education ==
Mary Eva Ryerson was born near Wilton, Iowa, on August 17, 1857. Her parents were Richard Allen Ryerson (1805–1894) and Nancy (Cole) Ryerson (1825–1899). Mary had six brothers: David, Peter, Nathan, John, Richard, and Maurice. She lived on a farm until the age of 18, and then moved to the town of Wilton Junction.

There, with alternate schooling and teaching, she nearly completed the course in the academy in that place, until the school closed. Entering the high school, in one year, she graduated with the highest honors.

At the age of 21, she began the study of medicine, with the help and encouragement of the family physician and his partners. She entered the medical college in Iowa City, Iowa a co-educational institution, which at that time had enrolled a membership of 90 men and ten women. From that experience, she became a firm opponent of co-education in medical colleges. The following year, she attended the Northwestern University Woman's Medical School in Chicago, Illinois, from which she was graduated.

== Career ==
In the spring of 1881, Butin entered the South Side Hospital (Note: According to the Illinois medical directory, 1910, a South Side Hospital was established in Chicago in 1905. As Willard & Livermore (1893) indicate that Butin joined the South Side Hospital staff in 1881, it appears that the hospital was located elsewhere.) as resident physician. Her duties were so arduous, the lack of nurses making it necessary for her to supply that position sometimes, that, after four months' service, she resigned and returned home for rest.

While on a visit to her brother in Dorchester, Nebraska, her practice became so extensive as to cause her to settle there, where she gradually overcame opposition among physicians and people to women practitioners. There she met the physician Dr. John L. Butin (1855–1933) and they married in May 1883.

Before she had been in the State for a year, Butin became a member of the Nebraska State Medical Society. She was the first woman to enter that society and was received in Hastings, Nebraska in 1882. Placed upon the program for a paper the next year, she was thereafter a contributor to some section of that society. She was elected first vice-president in 1889. She was a contributor to the Omaha, Nebraska Clinic and other medical journals, and was State superintendent of hygiene and heredity for the Woman's Christian Temperance Union (WCTU), county and local.

Associated with all progressive movements, Butin worked to end the prejudice against woman in the field of medical science.

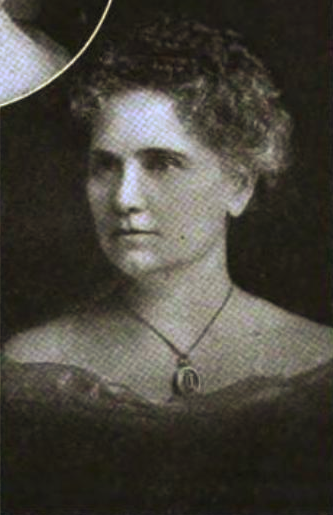
(Problems Women Solved, 1915)

In 1891, with her husband, she came to Madera, California and purchased a vineyard in the John Brown Colony. In Madera, she was active in all matters pertaining to public health, including 13 years as City and County Health Officer, and district chair of Public Welfare for the California Federation of Women's Clubs.

Though retired from medical practice by 1918, Butin provided volunteer medical services during the Spanish flu epidemic. She was a member of the Fresno County Medical Society, American Medical Association, and National Woman's Medical Society.

Butin was active in the woman's suffrage movement with Carrie Chapman Catt and Susan B. Anthony. She was associated with the American Association of University Women, Ina Coolbrith Society of Authors, Fresno Parlor Lecture Club, Business & Professional Women's Club, and the Madera Women's Improvement Club.

== Death ==
Mary Ryerson Butin died in Madera, California, on March 30, 1944.
