= Blanche Moore Haines =

American physician (1865–1944)

Dr. Blanche Moore Haines
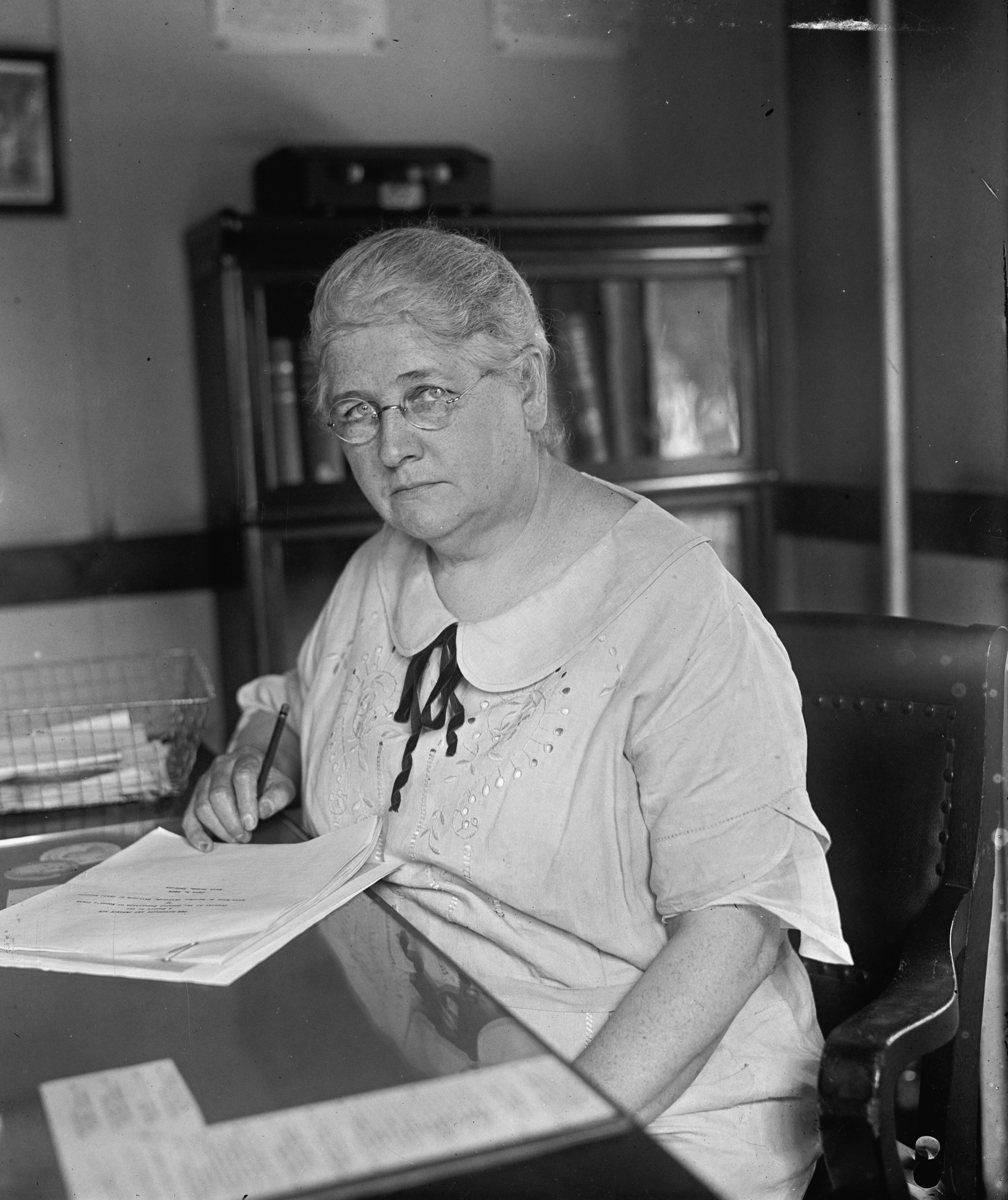
- Haines in 1925
- Born: Blanche Morris; December 21, 1865; New Castle County, Delaware, U.S.
- Died: November 9, 1944 (aged 78); Three Rivers, Michigan, U.S.
- Education: Woman's Hospital Medical College of Chicago; Philadelphia Polyclinic Medical School
- Occupations: physician; suffragist
- Known for: Michigan State chair, National Woman Suffrage Association
- Medical career
- Field: Maternal and infant care
- Institutions: Physician-director, Maternity and Infancy Division, Children's Bureau, U.S. Department of Labor

Blanche Moore Haines (1865–1944) was an American physician. She served as the physician-director of the Maternity and Infancy Division, Children's Bureau (CB), U.S. Department of Labor (now within the U.S. Department of Health and Human Services. An active suffragist, Haines served as Michigan State chair of the National Woman Suffrage Association (NWSA).

== Early life and education ==
Blanche Moore Haines was born in New Castle County, Delaware, on December 21, 1865. Her parents were George R. and Ann Eliza (Carter) Moore.

She was educated at Mount Carroll High School (Mount Carroll, Illinois, 1882); Mount Carroll Seminary (Mount Carroll, Illinois); Woman's Hospital Medical College of Chicago (Chicago, Illinois, 1886); Philadelphia Polyclinic Medical School, (Philadelphia, Pennsylvania, 1887). She received an M.D. degree from Woman's Hospital Medical College of Chicago.

== Career ==
While serving as the director of the Maternity and Infancy Division, CB, Haines made an extended trip to teach the mothers in various regions the proper care of their babies and prenatal care of themselves. Previously, she served as director of the Michigan bureau of child hygiene and public health nursing,

She served as chair, Michigan Department of Health, 1922–25; chair, Michigan State Public Health Department; and secretary, Medical Women's National Association. In 1920, after being active in the Ladies of the Maccabees (LOTM) for more than 24 years when, Haines was elected Assistant Great Medical Examiner (1920–21). She was a member of the American Medical Association, Michigan State Medical Association, Kalamazoo Academy of Medicine, American Public Health Association, and Michigan State Board for Registration of Nurses (resigned, 1925).

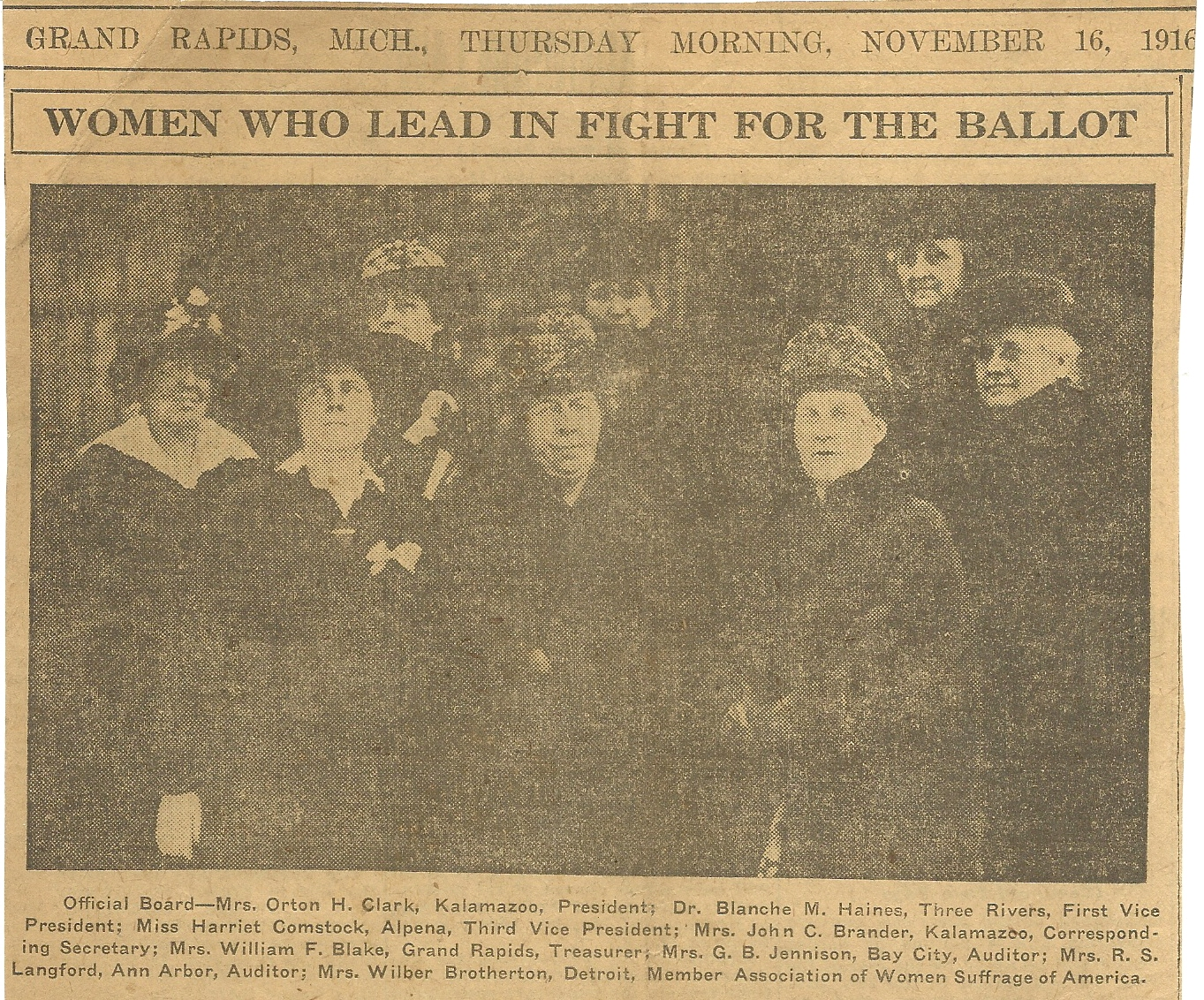
Haines served on the Board of the Michigan Equal Suffrage Association (pictured in 1916)

Haines served as Michigan State chair of the NWSA. She was a member of the Woman's Club, Parent-Teachers Association of Michigan, Michigan State Federation of Women's Clubs, and the Daughters of the American Revolution, serving as Regent of the DAR's Abiel Fellows Chapter.

Her written contributions included: Michigan Pioneer and Historical Collection, vol. 34; contribution to genealogy of certain Virginia Carters; and a contribution on life of an early medical botanist, Dr. Ezra Michener, of Chester County, Pennsylvania. In Dr. William Howard Kelley's encyclopedia of biographies, Haines contributed articles that were previously published in Michigan State Medical Journal signed "B. M. H. from Michigan Department of Health Breast feeding survey", also "Rickets" and "Michigan Hours of Sunshine". She published a "Report on Midwives in Michigan"; and "Report on infant clinics by age groups and sex groups, Michigan".

== Personal life ==
Haines resided in Lansing, Michigan, before relocating to Washington, D.C., on September 1, 1925. She had a summer home in Three Rivers, Michigan.

She married Dr. Thomas J. Haines, May 15, 1890.

Haines' hobby was old furniture.

Blanche Moore Haines died in Three Rivers, Michigan, on November 9, 1944.
