= Adolf Erwin Weber =

- Born: 19 June 1863; Brüttelen
- Died: 4 February 1948; La Chaux-de-Fonds
- Occupations: Missionary, translator
- Employer: Watch Tower Bible and Tract Society of Pennsylvania

Adolphe "Adolf" Erwin Weber (19 June 1863 in Brüttelen - 4 February 1948 in Neuchâtel) was an early member of the Bible Students movement who introduced its teachings and distributed its literature in Belgium, France Germany, Italy and Switzerland. Weber suggested to Charles Taze Russell, president of the Watch Tower Society and prominent leader of the Bible Students, that himself lead the movement's expansion in those countries and begin translating their religious literature into French.

== Life ==
Weber was born in Brüttelen, Switzerland, and worked as a lumberjack, forester and gardener. Raised in an Anabaptist tradition, he moved to the United States as a young man to study religion.

While in the United States, he responded to a job advertisement and was employed as a gardener by Charles Taze Russell, who resided in Allegheny, Pennsylvania (now part of Pittsburgh). After studying the book The Divine Plan of the Ages and attending meetings hosted by Russell, Weber adopted the group's beliefs and was baptized in 1890.

Weber planned to return to Switzerland and suggested to Charles Taze Russell that religious literature be distributed in French-speaking countries. Russell approved the plan and agreed to fund the distribution of these publications in French-speaking Europe. Weber returned around 1895, working as a forester and gardener while continuing his religious outreach.

=== Return to Europe ===
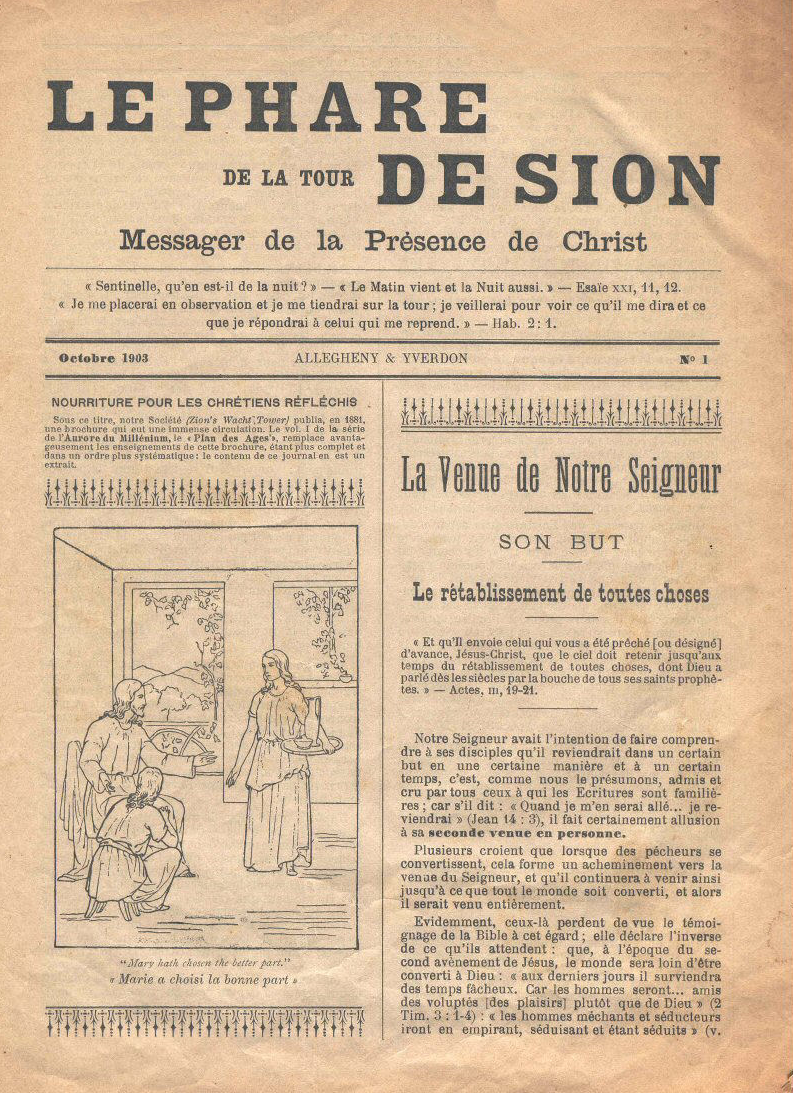
First issue of Zion's Watchtower in French, October 1903.

Back to Switzerland, in the 1900s, Weber made his debut with his missionary activities to create small communities in the Jura. Weber began translating into French the works, and announced in religioius newspapers and magazines the existence of the first volume of Études dans les Ecritures and Le Phare de Sion (October 1903).

His strategy was to place classified ads in local newspapers and periodicals to promote Russell's writings. Every winter, he traveled to France, Belgium, and Italy to preach. In 1904, he came to France, to the Doubs region. He then traveled to Charleroi and Ampsin (Belgium), where he founded the first groups of Bible Students. Along with a few Belgian preachers, he canvassed the coal-mining region of northern France, distributing tracts as people left Baptist churches.

His preaching bore fruit, for in 1906 a few Baptists left their congregation to form a small group of Bible Students in Denain (Nord), which met in members' homes to study Russell's writings. From 1906 to 1909, the movement spread throughout the mining region: a large group (ecclesia) was formed in Lens, followed by others in Hénin-Liétard, Auchel, Flines-lez-Raches, and Sin-le-Noble. Another was founded in Roubaix. The movement recruited mainly miners and factory workers.

The 1980 Yearbook of Jehovah's Witnesses states:

As a result of Brother Weber's advertising campaign in the press, more and more people were ordering and studying the Society's Bible literature. During the summer, Weber would work in Switzerland as a woodcutter and gardener, distributing tracts and preaching among the French-speaking Swiss people. Then he would set off on long trips visiting people in France and Belgium who had ordered literature or had subscribed for the Watch Tower. During his travels he did gardening and odd jobs to earn his keep. As a consequence of Brother Weber's devoted service, the truth began to spread in different parts of France.

From 1909 to 1910, Wever organized meetings and assemblies and led the Bible Students organization. In June 1912, Russell established the "French Office" in Geneva, Switzerland, to direct work across France, Belgium, and French-speaking Switzerland. He appointed Emile Lanz, a Swiss dentist from Mulhouse, Alsace, to head the branch. Lanz then hired Alexandre Freytag to assist with translating the French Watch Tower. Consequently, Adolphe Weber, who had managed the French-speaking European work since the turn of the century, stepped down for the more educated Lanz and Freytag. Maintaining a positive spirit, Weber transitioned to yearly pilgrim visits. In December 1912, he embarked on a extensive tour through France, visiting 42 towns and villages.

== Bibliography ==
- Dericquebourg, Régis; Weber, Alfred (2001). Les marges du Christianisme.
- Dericquebourg, Régis (2004). "L'implantation des édifices culturels des Témoins de Jéhovah en France". Les Annales de la Recherche Urbaine. Urbanité et Liens Religieux. 96 (1): 83–89. doi:10.3406/aru.2004.2558.
- Dericquebourg, Régis (2016). "France. Jehovah's Witnesses in Twentieth-Century France". In Besier, Gerhard (ed.). Jehovah's Witnesses in Europe: Past and Present. Vol. 1. Cambridge Scholars Publishing. pp. 47–85. ISBN 9781443898515.
- McCabe, James M. (1999). "Jehovah's Witnesses in France". The Deterioration of Religious Liberty in Europe. Vol. 4. pp. 48–52.
- Nerlich, Angela (2016). ""And Suddenly the Germans Were Here". The Persecution of Jehovah's Witnesses in France and Luxembourg". In Besier, Gerhard (ed.). Jehovah's Witnesses in Europe: Past and Present. Vol. 1. Cambridge Scholars Publishing. ISBN 9781443898515.

Watchtower sources

- Writing Committee of the Governing Body (1980). "France". 1980 Yearbook of Jehovah's Witnesses. Watch Tower Bible and Tract Society of Pennsylvania. pp. 34–121.
- Writing Committee of the Governing Body (1993). "Chapter 22 § Part 1—Witnesses to the Most Distant Part of the Earth § Humble Gardener Becomes Evangelizer in Europe". Jehovah's Witnesses—Proclaimers of God's Kingdom. pp. 409–411. LCCN 93222966. OCLC 29369422.
- "Switzerland and Liechtenstein". 1987 Yearbook of Jehovah's Witnesses. pp. 113–217.
