= Anna Byford Leonard =

American social reformer, ceramic artist, art teacher, author, and missionary

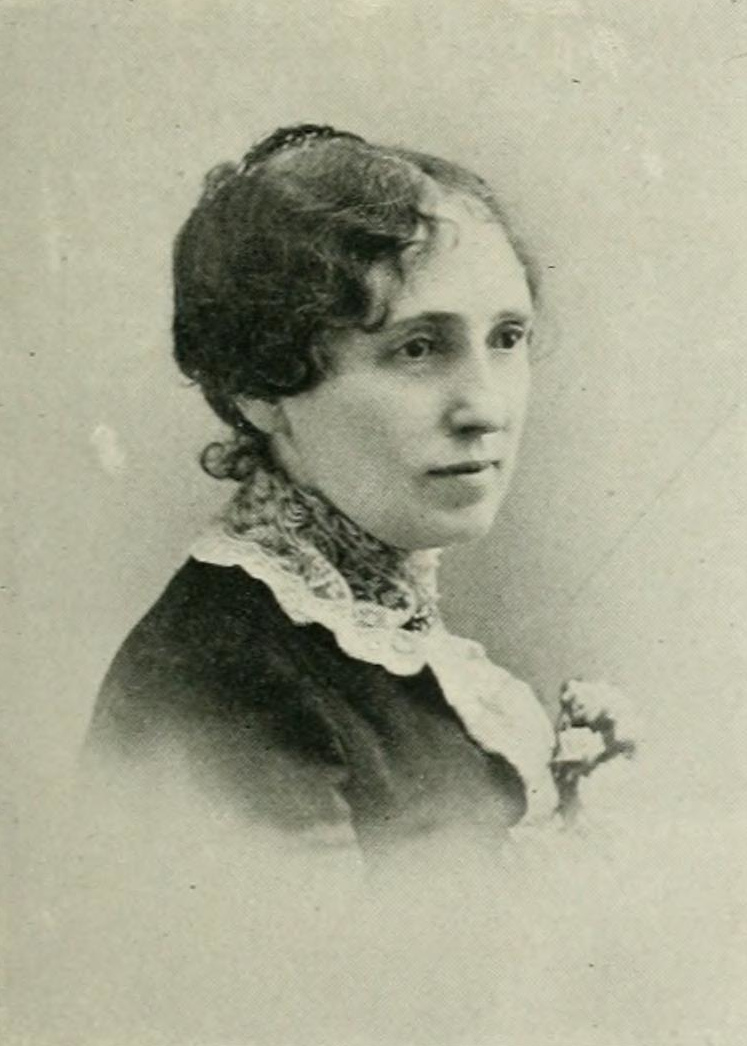
Photo in A woman of the century

Anna Eliza Byford Leonard (July 31, 1843 – December 28, 1930) was an American reformer, and the first woman appointed as sanitary inspector. She also served as president of the Women's Canning and Preserving Company.

== Early life ==
Anna Byford was born in Mount Vernon, Indiana, July 31, 1843. She was a daughter of the physician and surgeon William Heath Byford, of Chicago, Illinois. He was the founder and president of the Woman's Medical College of Chicago. In 1859, she married Walter Leonard in Chicago.

== Career ==
In 1889, Leonard was appointed as the first female sanitary inspector, and was enabled to carry out needed reforms, such as eight-hour laws that prevented children under fourteen from working over eight hours. Leonard and five other women enforced this law in all dry-goods stores. Additionally, Leonard endeavored to have seats placed in stores and factories, and ensured that women were allowed to sit when not occupied with their duties. Her connections to both the physicians and women of Chicago allowed these reforms to prevail, and her position as a sanitary inspector gave her the same privileges as an officer of the police force, thus ordaining her the authority for any work she found necessary to do. As a result of this eight-hour law, schools were established in some of the stores from eight to ten a. m.. giving the younger children, who spent that time on the street, two hours of schooling. In 1891, Leonard was made president of the Woman's Canning and Preserving Company, and in one year accrued a factory with four stories and basement, as well as a working capital of US$40,000. Leonard was an artist of ability, having studied abroad and traveled extensively.

Byford was a Theosophist. Some of her papers are held by New York Historical Society Museum & Library.

She moved to Lomaland, a Theosophical Society community in San Diego. She died there in 1930.
