= Marie J. Mergler =

American physician and surgeon

Marie J. Mergler M.D.
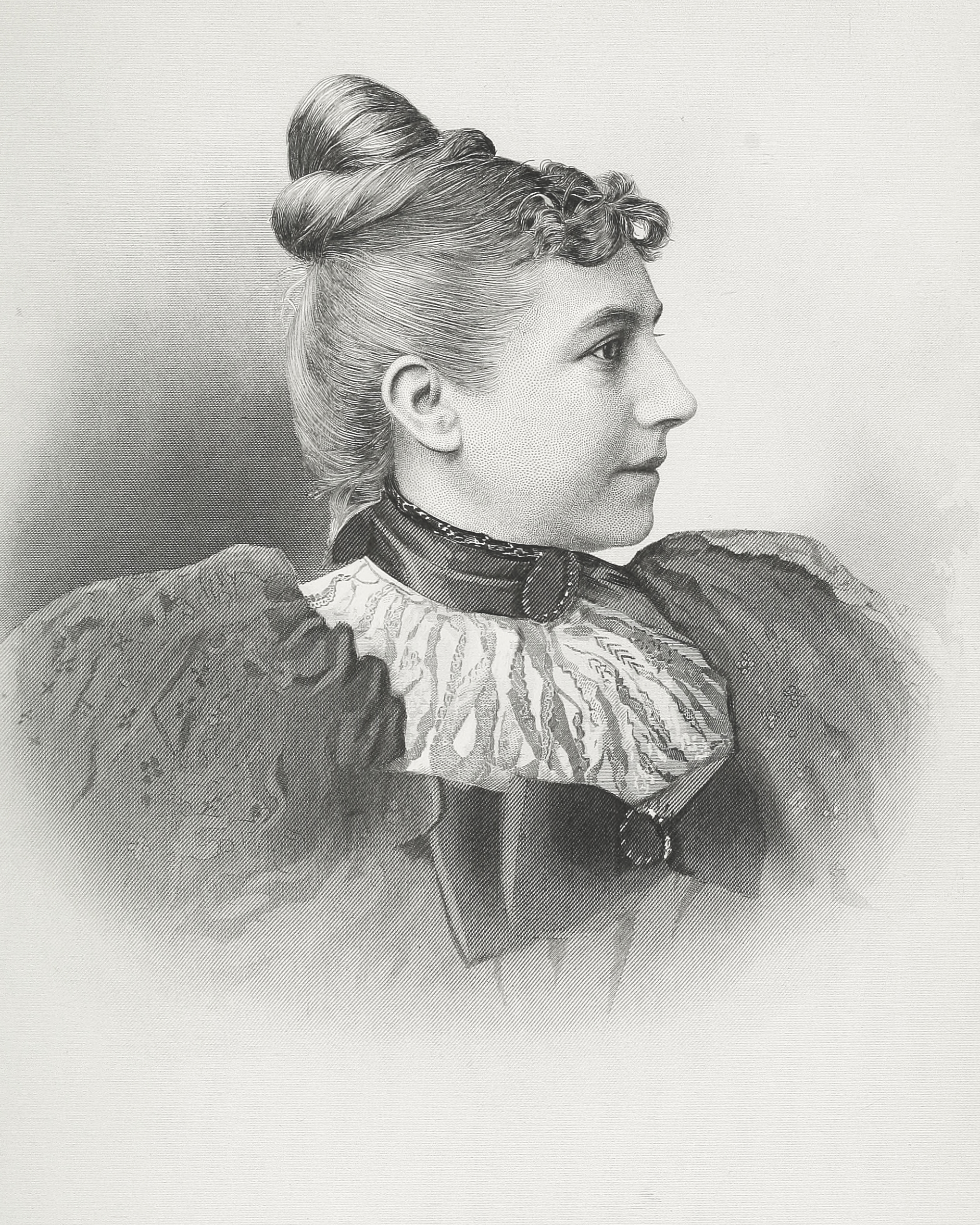
- Born: Marie Josepha Mergler; May 18, 1851; Mainstockheim, Bavaria, Germany
- Died: May 18, 1901 (aged 50); Los Angeles, California, U.S.
- Education: Cook County Normal School (now, Chicago State University; State Normal School at Oswego, New York (now, State University of New York at Oswego); Woman's Medical College of Chicago
- Occupations: physician, surgeon, medical writer

Signature
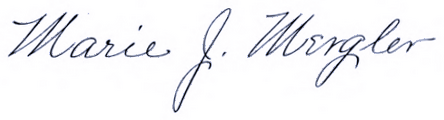

Marie J. Mergler (May 18, 1851 – May 18, 1901) was a 19th-century German-American physician, surgeon, and medical writer. She opened a general practice in Chicago in 1881, before specializing in obstetrics and gynaecology. She became a skilled gynecological surgeon, and in this field stood among those at the head of her profession in what was then considered to be the northwestern United States. She served her alma mater as lecturer, professor, secretary and Dean. She held several hospital positions as consultant or on the attending staff.

Mergler was connected with the Woman's Medical College of Chicago from the time of her graduation, and for many years, served as an executive officer of that institution, where she also occupied the chair of clinical and operative gynaecology. In 1899, Mergler was elected dean of the school, succeeding Isaac N. Danforth, resigned. In November 1895, she was elected head physician and surgeon to the Mary Thompson Hospital for Women and Children, from which position she resigned two years later. She was the attending surgeon to the Woman's Hospital of Chicago for many years, and was also on the hospital staff of the Post-Graduate school, where she conducted a clinic in operative gynecology. Her great achievement was in assisting women to obtain the very best opportunities for a thorough medical education in the Woman's Medical College at Chicago.

== Early life and education ==
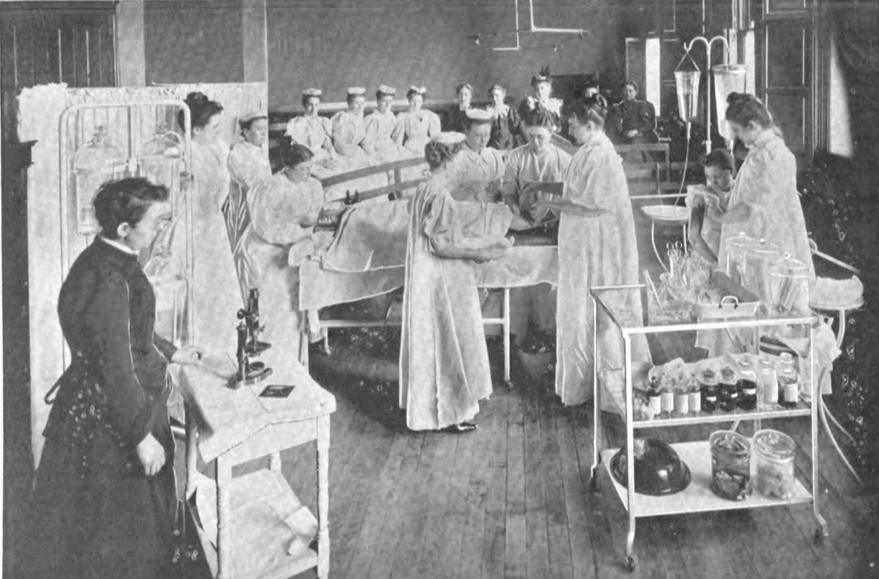
Skin grafting in a surgical clinic at Mary Thompson Hospital, Chicago. Marie J. Mergler, head physician and surgeon. (1897)

Marie Josepha Mergler was born in Mainstockheim, Bavaria, on May 18, 1851. She was the youngest of three children. Her father, Francis R. Mergler, was a graduate of the University of Würzburg. Her mother, Henriette, was descended from the German Von Rittershausen family.

When about one year old, her parents moved to the United States, settling in Wheeling, Illinois, where her father practiced his profession. Some time afterward, they moved to Palatine, Illinois, where he continued his practice until his death.

Owing to the limited advantages afforded by the district school, Francis Mergler personally directed the early education of his children, and when the increasing demands of his career rendered this impossible, instruction was continued by private teachers.

At seventeen, Mergler graduated from the Cook County Normal School (now Chicago State University), and one year later, entered the State Normal School at Oswego, New York (now, State University of New York at Oswego), where she was graduated from the classical course in 1871.

Mergler then became assistant principal of Englewood High School, a position she held for four years. Finding, however, that the profession of teaching was too narrow, she decided to pursue a career in medicine, as she had acquired a love for the subject from her father, whom she had occasionally assisted in his practice.

She matriculated at the Woman's Medical College of Chicago in 1876. While a student at the college she assisted William H. Byford, founder of the school, with some of his operations. She graduated from the college in 1879, valedictorian of her class. There were three other women in the class.

Mergler was immediately elected Lecturer on Materia Medica, but was given one year's leave of absence for study. Mergler was the first woman graduate to compete successfully with the graduates of other Chicago medical colleges for the appointment as intern of the Cook County Hospital at Dunning, standing second in the competitive examination. She received the appointment and was assigned a position which she was not allowed to fill. The place was given to a man who was not required to take the examination. Mergler then travelled to Switzerland, where she studied pathology and clinical medicine for one year at the University of Zurich.

== Career ==
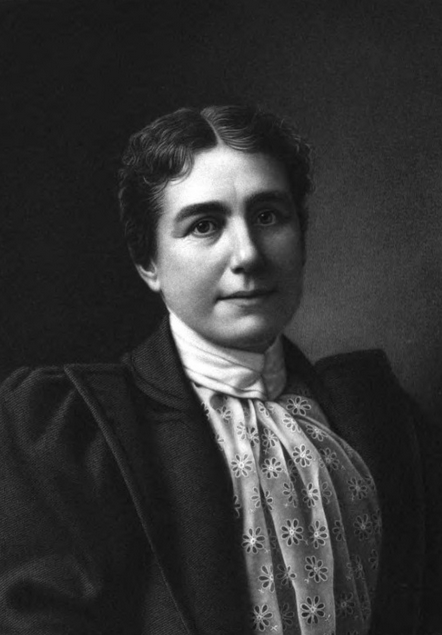
Marie J. Mergler

In 1881, Mergler returned to Chicago and opened a general practice.

In the Woman's Medical College she held the positions of Lecturer on Materia medica, Lecturer on Histology, of Materia Medica and Therapeutics, Clinical Instructor in Gynæcology, and adjunct professor of Gynæcology. After the death of Professor William H. Byford, she was appointed his successor as Professor of Gynæcology. Since 1885, she held the office of Secretary of this institution. During her term of office, she demonstrated great executive ability, laboring untiringly to advance the school. In connection with Charles Warrington Earle, she succeeded in maintaining the high standard and broad lines of the institution begun by Byford and his colleagues, and greatly widened its opportunities for usefulness by aiding in its union with a wealthy university, that being Northwestern University.

At the Lincoln Street Dispensary, she built up a gynæcological clinic in which the work was conducted by herself and her assistants. In 1882, she was one of the first two women elected on the attending staff of the Cook County Hospital (now, John H. Stroger Jr. Hospital of Cook County). In 1886, she was appointed one of the attending surgeons at the Woman's Hospital of Chicago, and in 1890, gynæcologist to Wesley Hospital (now, Northwestern Memorial Hospital).

In November, 1895, she was elected Head Physician and Surgeon at the Mary Thompson Hospital for Women and Children. In this appointment, Mergler received the unanimous support of the Chicago Gynæcological Society, and also of the majority of the members of the medical profession in the city, a tribute to her skill. In 1899, she was appointed dean of the school by the trustees of the Northwestern University, a position she held at the time of her death.

Mergler distinguished herself for her ability in abdominal surgery. Her success in the classroom equalled that in the consulting room. Her lectures were scientific and rendered more valuable by her ability to classify her knowledge and her clear-cut mode of expressing herself.

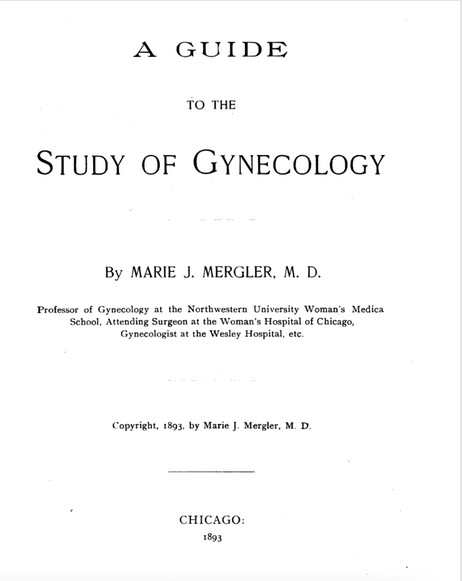
A Guide to the Study of Gynecology (1893)

She contributed papers to some of the State Medical Societies and leading medical journals, and was the author of A Guide to the Study of Gynecology (1893), a textbook used in the School. Mergler was a member of the staff of collaborators on The Woman's Medical Journal.

She was a member of several medical societies, contributing her share to the support and welfare of each. These included the Chicago Medical Society, of the Mississippi Valley Medical Association, and the American Medical Association.

== Later life and death ==
Mergler became ill August 1900, recovered partly, but left for California in April 1901, for rest and restoration of health. Arriving at Los Angeles, she was slightly better, but died in that city at the age of fifty years of pernicious anemia, May 18, 1901. (Note: According to American National Biography, Mergler's date of death was May 17, 1901.) Her mother, living at Palatine, Illinois and two sisters, Ernestine Schell and Anna Fritsch, survived her. The memorial service was held in Union Park Congregational Church, of which Mergler had been a member for many years.
