= Northwestern University Woman's Medical School =

American medical school for women (1870–1902)

Northwestern University Woman's Medical School is a defunct American medical school for the professional education of women. Located in Chicago, Illinois, it was organized in 1870 as the Woman's Hospital Medical College of Chicago, and it was in close connection with the Chicago Hospital for Women and Children. In 1879, it severed its connection with the hospital and took the name of the Woman's Medical College of Chicago. Co-education of the sexes, in medicine and surgery, was experimentally tried from 1868 to 1870, but the experiment proved repugnant to the male students, who unanimously signed a protest against the continuance of the system. The result was the establishment of a separate school for women in 1870, with a faculty of sixteen professors. The requirements for graduation were fixed at four years of medical study, including three annual graded college terms of six months each. The first term opened in the autumn of 1870, with an attendance of twenty students. The original location of the school was in the "North Division" of Chicago, in temporary quarters. After the fire of 1871 a removal was effected to the "West Division," where (in 1878-79) a modest, but well arranged building was erected. A larger structure was built in 1884. In 1891 or 1892, the institution became part of the Northwestern University, and changed title to Northwestern University Woman's Medical School. The university closed the college in 1902. The college, in all its departments, was organized along the lines of the best medical schools of the country. In 1896, there were twenty-four professorships, all capably filled, and among the faculty are some of the best known specialists in the country.

== History ==
This school was organized in 1870. As in other institutions of the kind, there were several conditions which combined to call it into existence, but the strong desire on the part of a few women to obtain a thorough medical education was the mainspring in the original attempt which resulted in its final establishment.

In 1852, Emily Blackwell attended one course of lectures in Rush Medical College; she was denied entrance a second year and finally graduated at a Cleveland institution. There was no surviving record of all the circumstances of this case, but referring to this period, Professor Charles Warrington Earle said:— "This much, however, is known: The Illinois State Medical Society, saturated with the then prevailing prejudices against female medical education, censured the college for admitting women to its instruction. A few years later two female practitioners, educated in the East, located in this city for a short time, but so far as I am aware no students received instruction or asked for it in their office." At about the same time Dr. Mary Harris Thompson came to practice in Chicago, and shortly afterward, by the assistance of Dr. Dyas and his public spirited wife, established Chicago Hospital for Women and Children. This soon became the rendezvous for the women of the West, who, being denied access to any regular college in this region, found in the clinical advantages of the hospital their nearest approximation to an institution for medical instruction."

Thompson herself was desirous of taking an advanced course, and realizing that the hospital advantages alone would not suffice to educate regular practitioners, she applied to Rush Medical College for admission, but it was refused on the ground of "inconvenience". One or two years passed by, and, as women still applied to the hospital for training, Thompson again sought admission to Rush and was again refused. In the meantime, Thompson made the acquaintance of Professor William H. Byford, who was then on the faculty of the Chicago Medical College. Having learned of a number of women throughout the Northwest who desired a thorough medical education, he promised to lay the matter before his faculty and to give it his support. Shortly before the opening of the term, the faculty agreed to admit women, but in the meantime most of the applicants had gone East, only four remaining. These, including Thompson, entered the college, and at the end of the term the latter received a diploma.

Referring to this time, Earle stated:— "Although the relations of the ladies and gentlemen as students had always been dignified and respectful, the male members of the class, at the close of the college year, sent to the faculty a formal protest against the admission of women, claiming that certain clinical material was not as ready in coming forward and that certain facts and observations of value were omitted from the lectures in the presence of a mixed class."

Immediately, correspondence sprang up between Byford and Thompson in regard to the founding of a new college for the exclusive education of women. Professor William Godfrey Dyas, in an address delivered February 27, 1879 , spoke of the college's origin:— "Thus was the college established. Whatever merit attaches to the project, whether in its inception, in its furtherance and in its subsequent progress, such can be claimed by none to the same extent as by Professor Byford."

A faculty composed largely of physicians connected with the Hospital for Women and Children was organized under the name of Woman's Hospital Medical College of Chicago, and a board of trustees composed of women and men friendly to female education, embracing a number of prominent citizens, was selected. The first regular course of lectures was delivered in the building occupied by the hospital referred to at No. 402 North Clark Street, Chicago. The second term was opened on October 3, in rooms which had been fitted up at Nos. I and 3 North Clark Street, when the Great Chicago Fire swept away the college and all its material possessions. Though three-fourths of the faculty had lost their homes, offices and libraries, they convened on October 10 and decided that the school should go on.

The students were notified and the lectures resumed at No. 341 West Adams Street. The hospital had been reëstablished at No. 600 of the same street and the college moved to that locality.

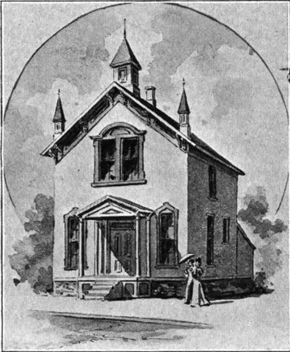
The "Little Barn" at Woman's Medical College of Chicago

In 1872, the school moved again. The hospital had, in the meantime, received US$25,000 of money from the Relief and Aid Society in consideration of certain medical and surgical services rendered from year to year, and had established itself on the corner of Adams and Paulina Streets. On its rear lot, there was a little barn, the use of which was granted to the faculty. US$3,000 were expended in converting this building into a comfortable and moderately convenient woman's medical college. On the first floor was a small lecture room, The "Little Barn", which also served for the purpose of library, faculty room and museum. The second floor was used for dissections. Although the accommodations were scant and facilities inadequate, the classes were intelligent, and many of those graduates obtained honorable and lucrative practice bringing credit upon the institution and inducing others to pursue the course.

== Alumnae association ==
The records of the initial alumnae association were lost subsequent to the death of Dr. Augusta Kent, class of 1871, secretary. The association was reorganized in 1881.

== Notable alumni ==
- Mary Ryerson Butin (1857–1944), physician
- Dr. Blanche Moore Haines (1865–1944) (graduated 1886), physician; Michigan State chair of the National Woman Suffrage Association
