= Wilton station (Iowa) =

Historic building

Wilton
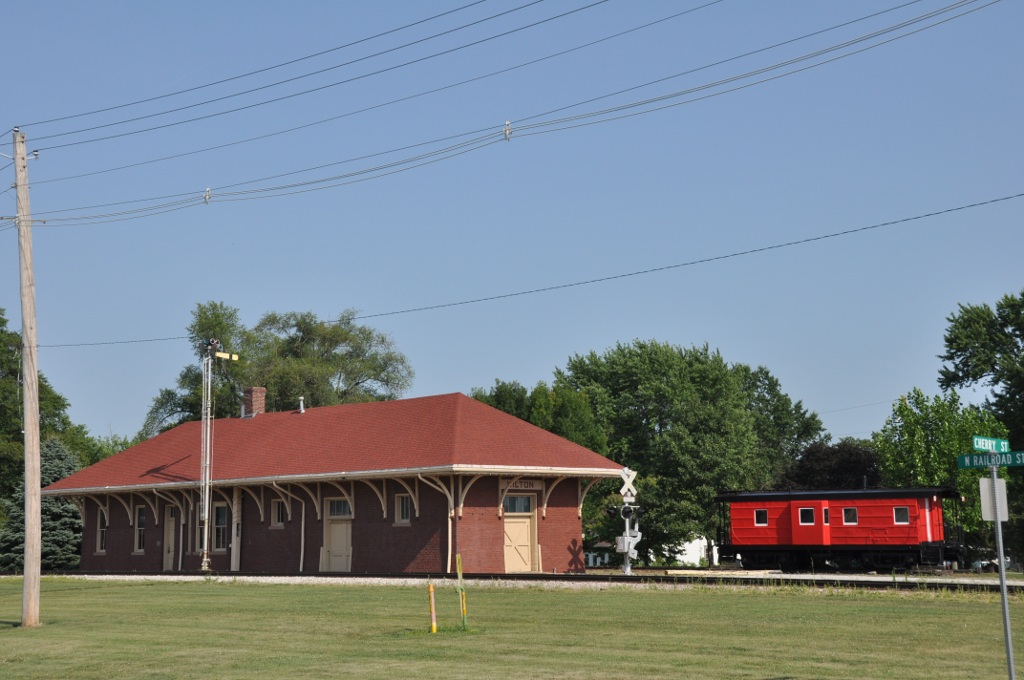

General information
- Location: Cherry Street and East Third Street, Wilton, Iowa 52778
- System: Former Rock Island Line passenger rail station

History
- Closed: 1974
- Rebuilt: 1898

Services
Preceding station	Chicago, Rock Island and Pacific Railroad	Following station
Moscow toward Colorado Springs	Main Line	Durant toward Chicago
- Chicago, Rock Island and Pacific Railroad-Wilton Depot
- U.S. National Register of Historic Places
- U.S. Historic district – Contributing property
- Location within Iowa Location within the United States
- Location: N. Railroad St. Wilton, Iowa
- Coordinates: 41°35′16″N 91°0′58″W
- Area: less than one acre
- Built: 1898
- Architectural style: Romanesque
- Part of: Wilton Commercial Historic District (ID16000606)
- NRHP reference No.: 88001326
- Added to NRHP: August 25, 1988
Location

Chicago, Rock Island and Pacific Railroad-Wilton Depot is an historic building located in Wilton, Iowa, United States. The Mississippi and Missouri Railroad built the first rail line in 1855 in what would be called Wilton Junction. The railroad became the Chicago, Rock Island and Pacific Railroad (CRI&P) a few years later. A wooden frame depot and a separate freight facility served the community. The railroad placed their repair and maintenance center in Wilton, and it remained here until 1881 when they started to move operations to Davenport and Muscatine. Rail service continued to increase along the CRI&P, which necessitated a new depot in Wilton. This single-story, brick Romanesque Revival structure was completed in 1898. Six passenger trains stopped in Wilton in 1911, and by 1922 same-day service to and from Chicago began.

While the number of freight trains passing through town numbered five or six by 1947, the number of passenger trains declined to one local Chicago to Des Moines train, westbound-only in 1953. The station was finally dropped from passenger timetables in 1954. The depot received part-time freight service from 1963 to 1974, when the depot closed.

After the building served as a freight depot it went into decline until the Wilton Historical Society obtained and restored it. The former depot was individually listed on the National Register of Historic Places in 1988. In 2016 it was included as a contributing property in the Wilton Commercial Historic District.
