= Wilton Candy Kitchen =

- U.S. National Register of Historic Places
- U.S. Historic district – Contributing property
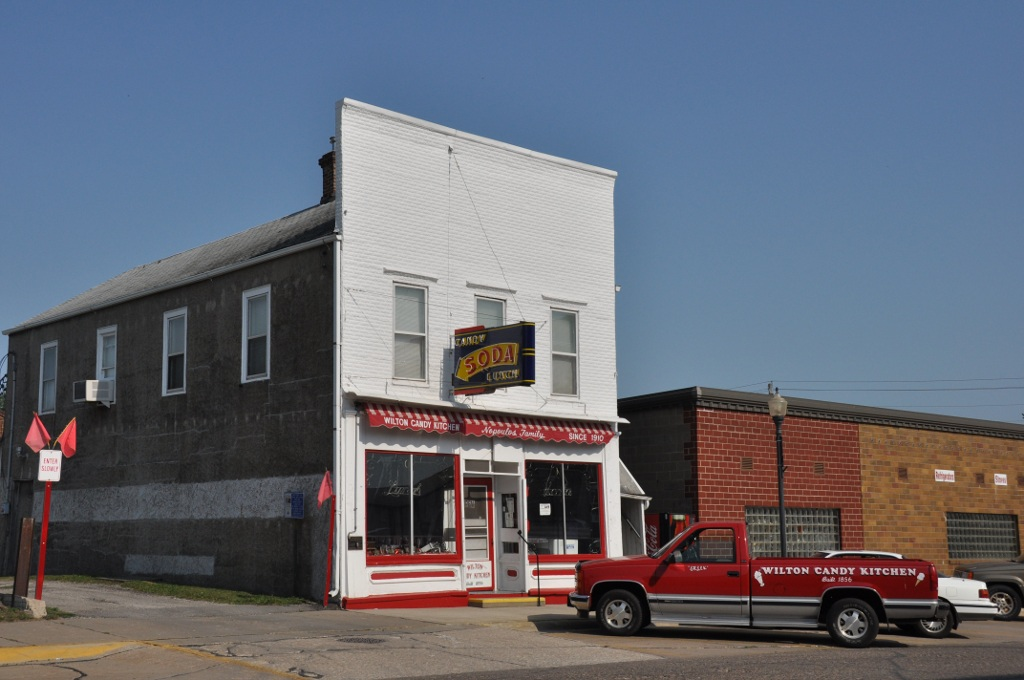
- exterior, 2012

- Location within Iowa Location within the United States
- Location: 310 Cedar St. Wilton, Iowa
- Coordinates: 41°35′16″N 91°01′06″W
- Area: Less than one acre
- Built: 1856; 170 years ago
- Part of: Wilton Commercial Historic District (ID16000606)
- NRHP reference No.: 92001742
- Added to NRHP: January 7, 1993; 33 years ago

Wilton Candy Kitchen is a combination ice cream parlor, soda fountain and confectionery store located in Wilton, Iowa, United States. The two-story wood-frame building has a gable roof that is obstructed on the main facade by a false front. It retains its interior from 1922. The shop was founded in 1867, and it is considered to be the oldest continuing business of its type in the United States. The business was bought by Gus Nopoulos, a Greek immigrant who worked in his uncle's candy store in Davenport, Iowa before he bought this store in 1910 with Nick Parros. The building already contained the candy making equipment, a soda fountain, and other furnishings. In 1913 Nopoulos bought the building and bought out his partner. The tin ceiling was installed in 1915. He acquired the interior furnishings from the Elite Confectionery in Davenport and had them installed here in 1922. Gus Nopoulos continued to be involved with the shop until his death in 1983. His son George and daughter-in-law Thelma were also involved in the operation of the business.

The shop serves George's homemade ice cream, phosphates, lunches, and candy. In the back of the building is a museum of Wilton's history. The building was individually listed on the National Register of Historic Places in 1993. In 2016 it was included as a contributing property in the Wilton Commercial Historic District.
