= Angela Nerlich =

- Born: 1966 (age 59–60)

Academic work
- Discipline: history
- Main interests: Jehovah's Witnesses under totalitarian regimes
- Notable works: Die Verfolgung der Zeugen Jehovas in München 1933-1945

Angela Nerlich (born 1966) is a German historian, researcher, and independent author who specializes in contemporary history and religious persecution, with a particular focus on the experiences and resistance of Jehovah's Witnesses under totalitarian regimes. Throughout her career, she has contributed to the documentation of human rights and historical memory in 20th-century Europe.

Nerlich collaborates with organizations dedicated to preserving the memory of victims of war and ideological persecution, such as the Arnold Liebster Foundation. In this context, she participates in international forums on historical debate, interviews on heritage and commemorative education, as well as public awareness events in Germany.

== Research and publications ==
Nerlich has thoroughly documented the experiences of religious groups persecuted by National Socialism in Germany and other occupied countries.

Books

- Nerlich, Angela (1999). Die Verfolgung der Zeugen Jehovas in München 1933-1945. Wachtturm-Gesellschaft, Geschichtsarchiv, Selters/Taunus.

Book chapters

- ——————— (1999). ""And suddenly the Germans were here" : the persecution of Jehovah's Witnesses in France and Luxembourg". In Besier, Gerhard; Stokłosa, Katarzyna (eds.). Jehovah's Witnesses in Europe : past and present. Vol. 1. Cambridge Scholars Publishing. pp. 86–287. ISBN 9781443898515.
- ——————— (2013). "„Und plötzlich waren die Deutschen da". Die Verfolgung von Jehovas Zeugen in Frankreich und in Luxemburg". In Besier, Gerhard; Stokłosa, Katarzyna (eds.). Jehovas Zeugen in Europa – Geschichte und Gegenwart. Vol. 1. Münster: LIT-Verlag. pp. 91–266. ISBN 9783643115089.
- ———————; Wolfram, Slupina (1998). "Aus der Vergessenheit geholt: Der Fall Hans Gärtner". In Hesse, Hans (ed.). "Am mutigsten waren immer die Zeugen Jehovas" Verfolgung und Widerstand der Zeugen Jehovas im Nationalsozialismus. Bremen: Edition Temmen. pp. 177–241.
- ———————; Wolfram, Slupina (2001). "Rescued From Oblivion: The Case of Hans Gärtner". In Hesse, Hans (ed.). Persecution and Resistance of Jehovah's Witnesses During the Nazi-Regime. Berghahn Series. Berghahn Books. pp. 166–196. ISBN 978-3-86108-750-2.
