= Wilton, Iowa =

- City
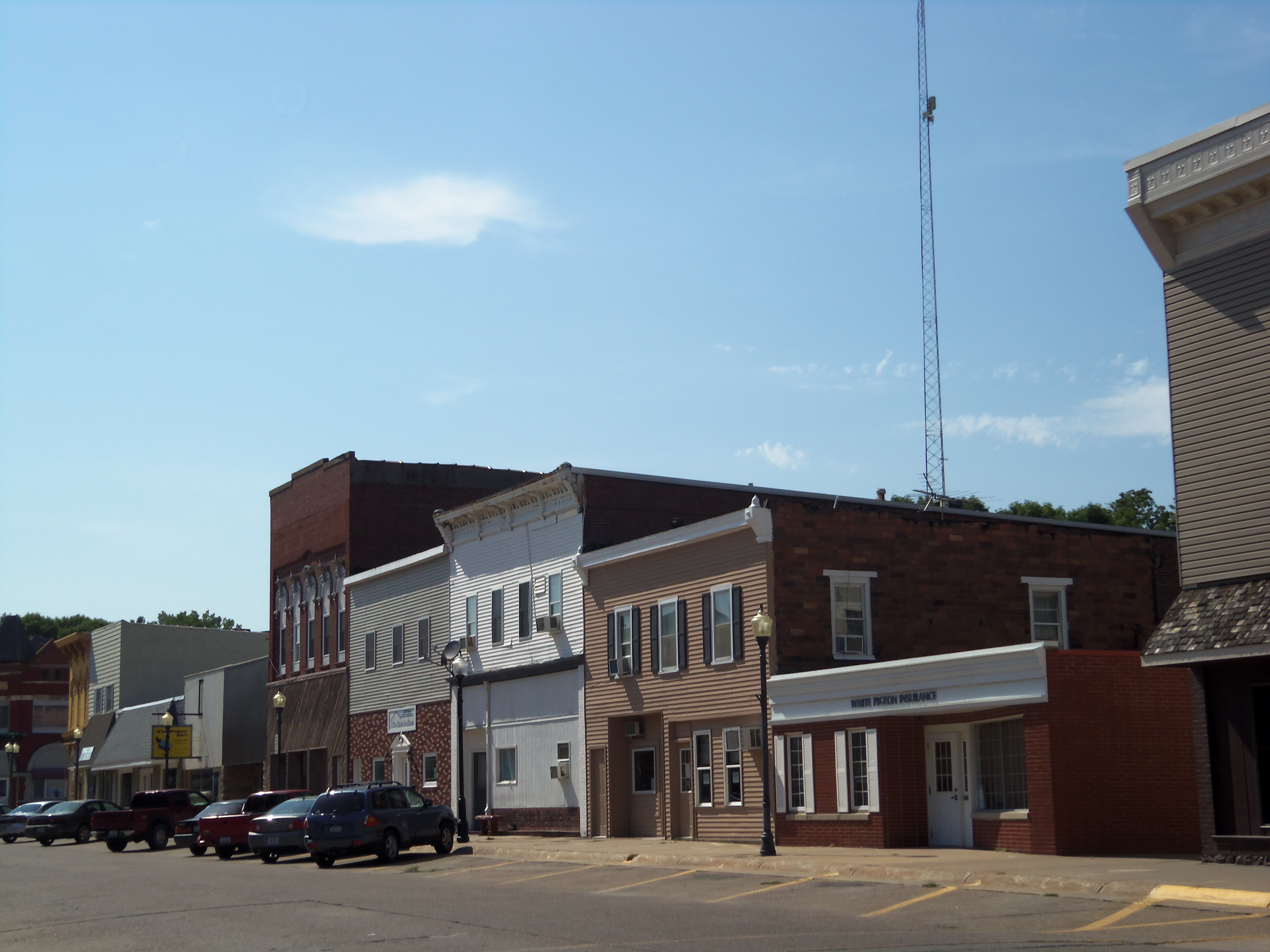
- Buildings on the north side of West Fourth Street
- Motto: "Welcome Home!"
- Location of Wilton, Iowa
- Coordinates: 41°35′23″N 91°01′38″W
- Country: United States
- State: Iowa
- Counties: Muscatine, Cedar
- Founded: 1855

Government
  - Type: Mayor-council government

Area
  - Total: 2.06 sq mi (5.33 km^{2})
  - Land: 2.05 sq mi (5.32 km^{2})
  - Water: 0.0039 sq mi (0.01 km^{2})
- Elevation: 682 ft (208 m)

Population (2020)
  - Total: 2,924
  - Estimate (2021): 2,916
  - Density: 1,423.2/sq mi (549.49/km^{2})
- Time zone: UTC-6 (Central (CST))
  - Summer (DST): UTC-5 (CDT)
- ZIP code: 52778
- Area code: 563
- FIPS code: 19-86070
- GNIS feature ID: 2397334
- Website: www.wiltoniowa.org

Wilton (formerly Wilton Junction) is a city in Cedar and Muscatine counties in the U.S. state of Iowa. The population was 2,924 at the time of the 2020 census. The Muscatine County portion of Wilton is part of the Muscatine Micropolitan Statistical Area.

== History ==
The first settler to build a home in the area that was to be known as Wilton in the new state of Iowa (1846) was Mr. Christian Marolf who came in July 1849, and erected of a small log house opposite the German Lutheran church. When he built his home Mr. Marolf could only see the home of Mr. Stearns just west of town on the south side of the Moscow road. Mr. Marolf was soon followed by Mr. Ben Maurer in 1850 whose land now comprises North Wilton and Peter Marolf in 1851, which is now known as Marolf's addition. North Wilton is at present (1947) not within the corporate limits of Wilton. The city was once home to the Wilton German English College from 1894 to 1905. The campus of the college was later turned into City Park, and some of the college's buildings remain to this day.

== Geography ==
According to the United States Census Bureau, the city has a total area of 1.95 square miles (5.05 km^{2}), all land. The city sits at an elevation of 679 feet.

== Demographics ==
Historical populations
Year	Pop.	±%
1870	1,317	—
1880	1,431	+8.7%
1890	1,212	−15.3%
1900	1,233	+1.7%
1910	1,157	−6.2%
1920	1,178	+1.8%
1930	1,104	−6.3%
1940	1,146	+3.8%
1950	1,446	+26.2%
1960	1,750	+21.0%
1970	1,873	+7.0%
1980	2,502	+33.6%
1990	2,577	+3.0%
2000	2,829	+9.8%
2010	2,802	−1.0%
2020	2,924	+4.4%
Source:"U.S. Census website". United States Census Bureau. and Iowa Data Center; Source: U.S. Decennial Census

=== 2020 census ===
As of the 2020 census, there were 2,924 people, 1,166 households, and 761 families residing in the city.

The population density was 1,423.2 inhabitants per square mile (549.5/km^{2}). There were 1,255 housing units at an average density of 610.8 per square mile (235.8/km^{2}). 0.0% of residents lived in urban areas, while 100.0% lived in rural areas.

Of households, 31.1% had children under the age of 18 living in them. Of all households, 50.3% were married-couple households, 17.2% were households with a male householder and no spouse or partner present, and 25.6% were households with a female householder and no spouse or partner present. About 28.5% of all households were made up of individuals, and 13.3% had someone living alone who was 65 years of age or older. Of all housing units, 7.1% were vacant. The homeowner vacancy rate was 2.3% and the rental vacancy rate was 8.0%.

The median age in the city was 38.6 years. 25.1% of residents were under the age of 18 and 17.3% were 65 years of age or older. 27.4% of residents were under the age of 20; 4.3% were between the ages of 20 and 24; 25.3% were from 25 to 44; and 25.8% were from 45 to 64. For every 100 females, there were 93.8 males, and for every 100 females age 18 and over there were 91.2 males.

Racial composition as of the 2020 census
Race	Number	Percent
White	2,708	92.6%
Black or African American	14	0.5%
American Indian and Alaska Native	7	0.2%
Asian	10	0.3%
Native Hawaiian and Other Pacific Islander	0	0.0%
Some other race	29	1.0%
Two or more races	156	5.3%
Hispanic or Latino (of any race)	130	4.4%

=== 2010 census ===
As of the census of 2010, there were 2,802 people, 1,155 households, and 767 families residing in the city. The population density was 1,436.9 inhabitants per square mile (554.8/km^{2}). There were 1,231 housing units at an average density of 631.3 per square mile (243.7/km^{2}). The racial makeup of the city was 97.5% White, 0.3% African American, 0.1% Asian, 0.9% from other races, and 1.2% from two or more races. Hispanic or Latino of any race were 2.6% of the population.

There were 1,155 households, of which 34.2% had children under the age of 18 living with them, 50.5% were married couples living together, 10.3% had a female householder with no husband present, 5.6% had a male householder with no wife present, and 33.6% were non-families. 28.1% of all households were made up of individuals, and 10.7% had someone living alone who was 65 years of age or older. The average household size was 2.43 and the average family size was 2.97.

The median age in the city was 37.7 years. 26.2% of residents were under the age of 18; 8.1% were between the ages of 18 and 24; 25.5% were from 25 to 44; 27.4% were from 45 to 64; and 13% were 65 years of age or older. The gender makeup of the city was 49.7% male and 50.3% female.

=== 2000 census ===
As of the census of 2000, there were 2,842 people, 1,105 households, and 784 families residing in the city. The population density was 1,509.5 inhabitants per square mile (582.8/km^{2}). There were 1,141 housing units at an average density of 608.8 per square mile (235.1/km^{2}). The racial makeup of the city was 97.74% White, 0.21% African American, 0.21% Native American, 0.46% Asian, 0.60% from other races, and 0.78% from two or more races. Hispanic or Latino of any race were 2.01% of the population.

There were 1,105 households, out of which 36.1% had children under the age of 18 living with them, 58.2% were married couples living together, 8.3% had a female householder with no husband present, and 29.0% were non-families. 25.3% of all households were made up of individuals, and 8.7% had someone living alone who was 65 years of age or older. The average household size was 2.54 and the average family size was 3.05.

In the city, the population was spread out, with 27.7% under the age of 18, 8.5% from 18 to 24, 30.5% from 25 to 44, 20.0% from 45 to 64, and 13.2% who were 65 years of age or older. The median age was 35 years. For every 100 females, there were 93.8 males. For every 100 females age 18 and over, there were 93.7 males.

The median income for a household in the city was $44,278, and the median income for a family was $49,615. Males had a median income of $37,146 versus $23,350 for females. The per capita income for the city was $18,445. About 5.5% of families and 6.5% of the population were below the poverty line, including 9.2% of those under age 18 and 3.8% of those age 65 or over.

== Arts and culture ==
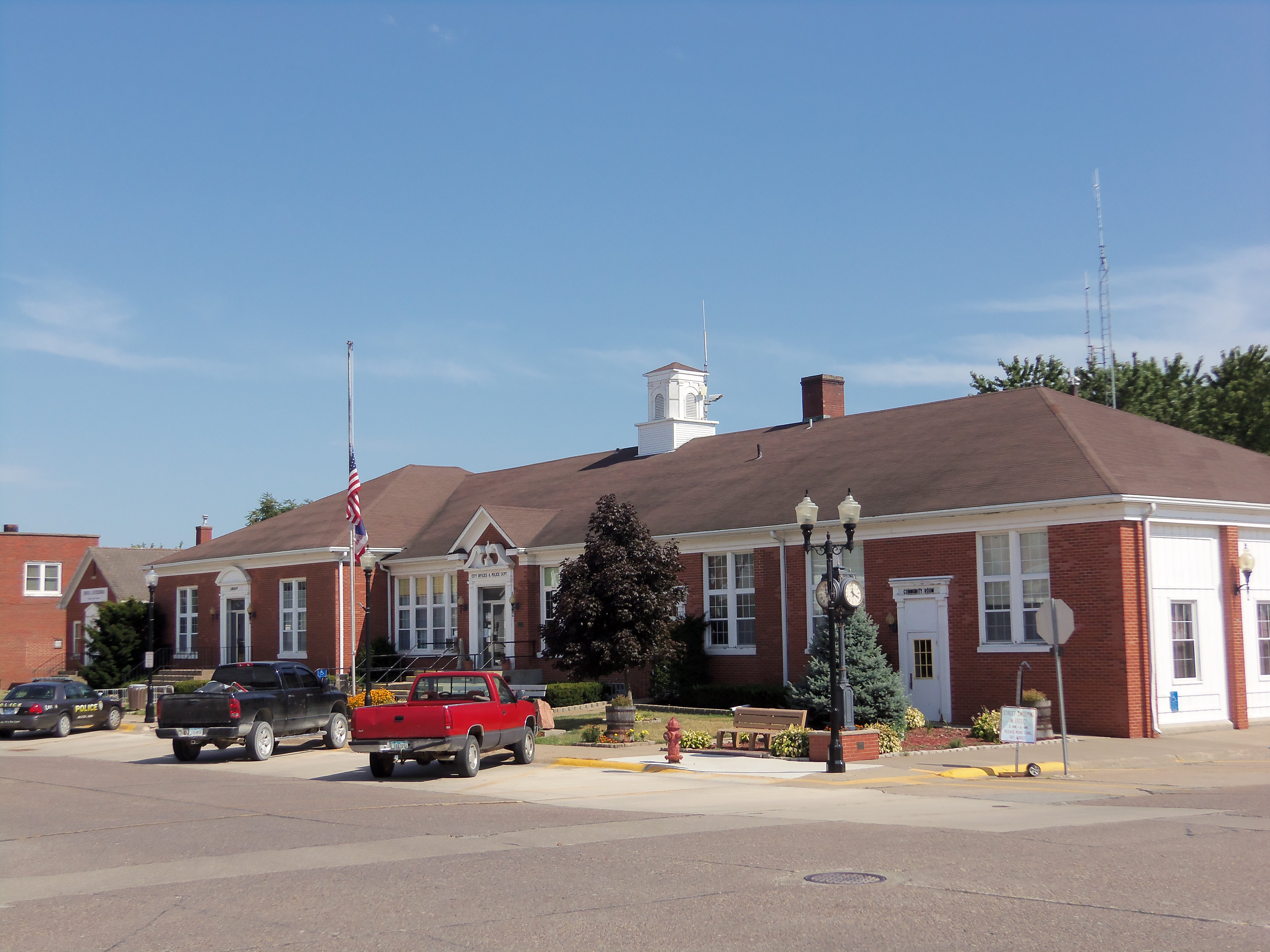
Wilton City Hall

Witon has a library/community center building in the northeast section of the city, near the high school that provides numerous resources to residents.

Historic sites include the Wilton Candy Kitchen, which is the oldest ice cream parlor in the world, and the former Chicago, Rock Island, and Pacific Railroad depot built in 1898. Both are in the downtown area and on the National Register of Historic Places.

== Parks and recreation ==
Wilton has four parks. The City Park (known by residents as the Blue Park) in the heart of the town had an indoor swimming pool (torn down in 2024) as well as a playground, shelter house, and baseball field. Westview Park is on the west side of town and has tennis courts, playground equipment, a walking path, and a ball field. Elder Park is in the downtown area and has a small picnic area. Cherrydale Park on the southside contains three baseball fields and a playground.

== Religion ==
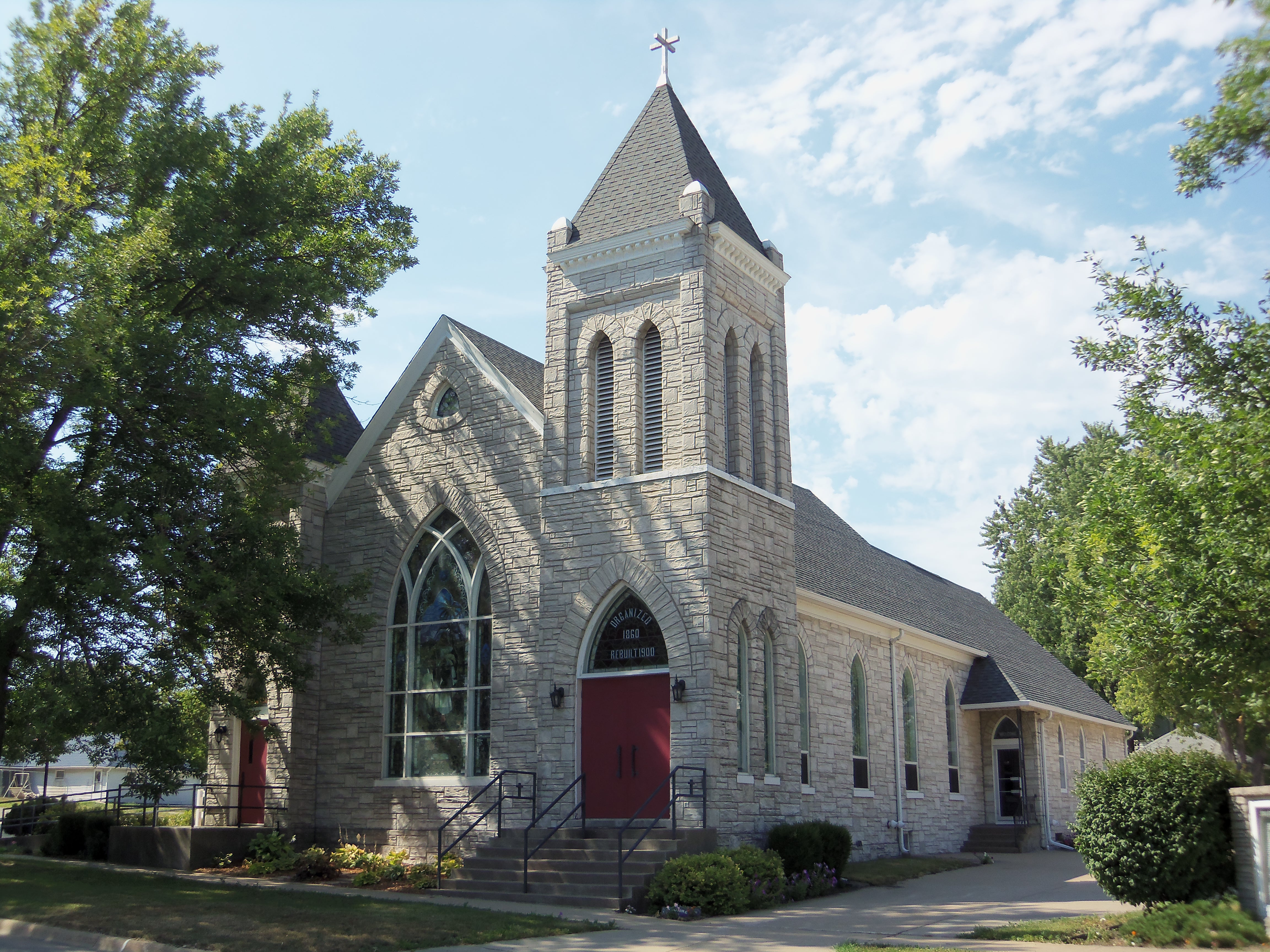
First Presbyterian Church

Wilton is home to many churches, including St. Mary's Catholic Church, Presbyterian Church, Grace United Church of Christ, Heartland Fellowship Church, United Methodist Church, and the Zion Lutheran Church.

== Education ==
Public schools

The Wilton Community School District, home to the Wilton Beavers and part of the River Valley Conference, serves Wilton, Moscow, and the surrounding rural areas. The school district includes an elementary school and a junior/senior high school, which is now a connecting part of the new elementary. The school has a student-teacher ratio of 12:1.

== Media ==
The Wilton-Durant Advocate News is a weekly newspaper in the area. Daily newspapers such as the Muscatine Journal and the Quad-City Times are available.

Wilton Jr./Sr. High School has a student-run school news website called This Just In, which is maintained during the school year by journalism students. The class also produces a student newspaper called "The Beaver Tale" which is printed monthly during the school year in the Advocate News.

== Infrastructure ==
=== Transportation ===
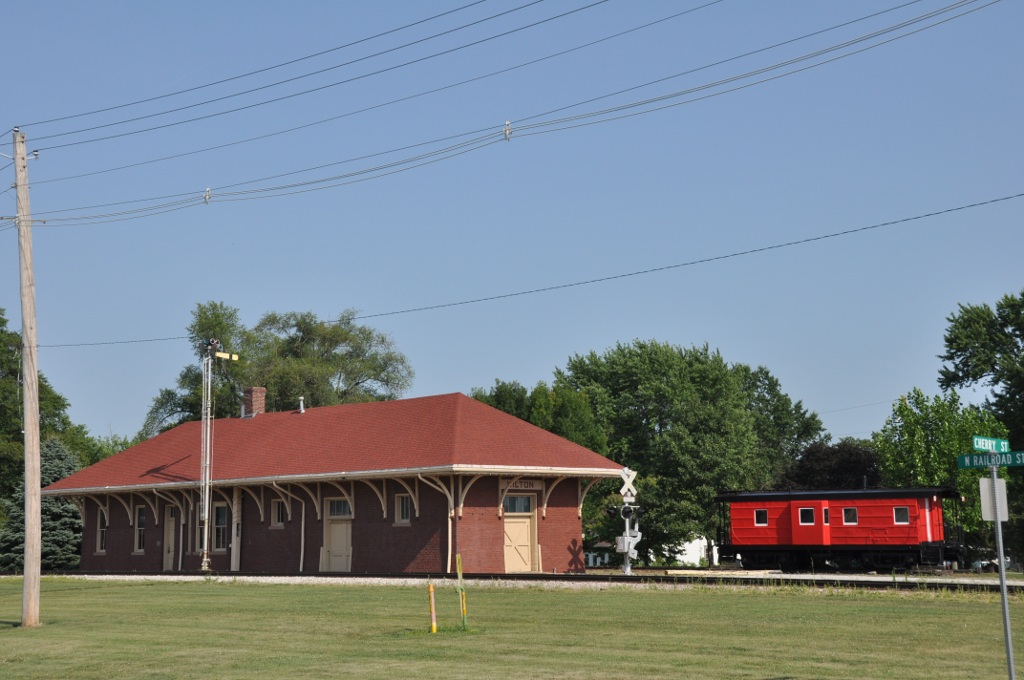
Former Chicago, Rock Island and Pacific Railroad Depot

Wilton is three miles (5 km) south of Interstate 80, at the junction of County Highway F58 and Iowa Highway 38, within driving distance of Muscatine, the Quad Cities, Iowa City, and Cedar Rapids. The Iowa Interstate Railroad passes through the city and provides service to local industries. The Quad City International Airport is 30 miles east of Wilton providing non-stop flights to destinations throughout the country. Wilton sits along the historic transcontinental U.S. Route 6, though this section was transferred to Iowa Highway 927 and later to county F58.

=== Utilities ===
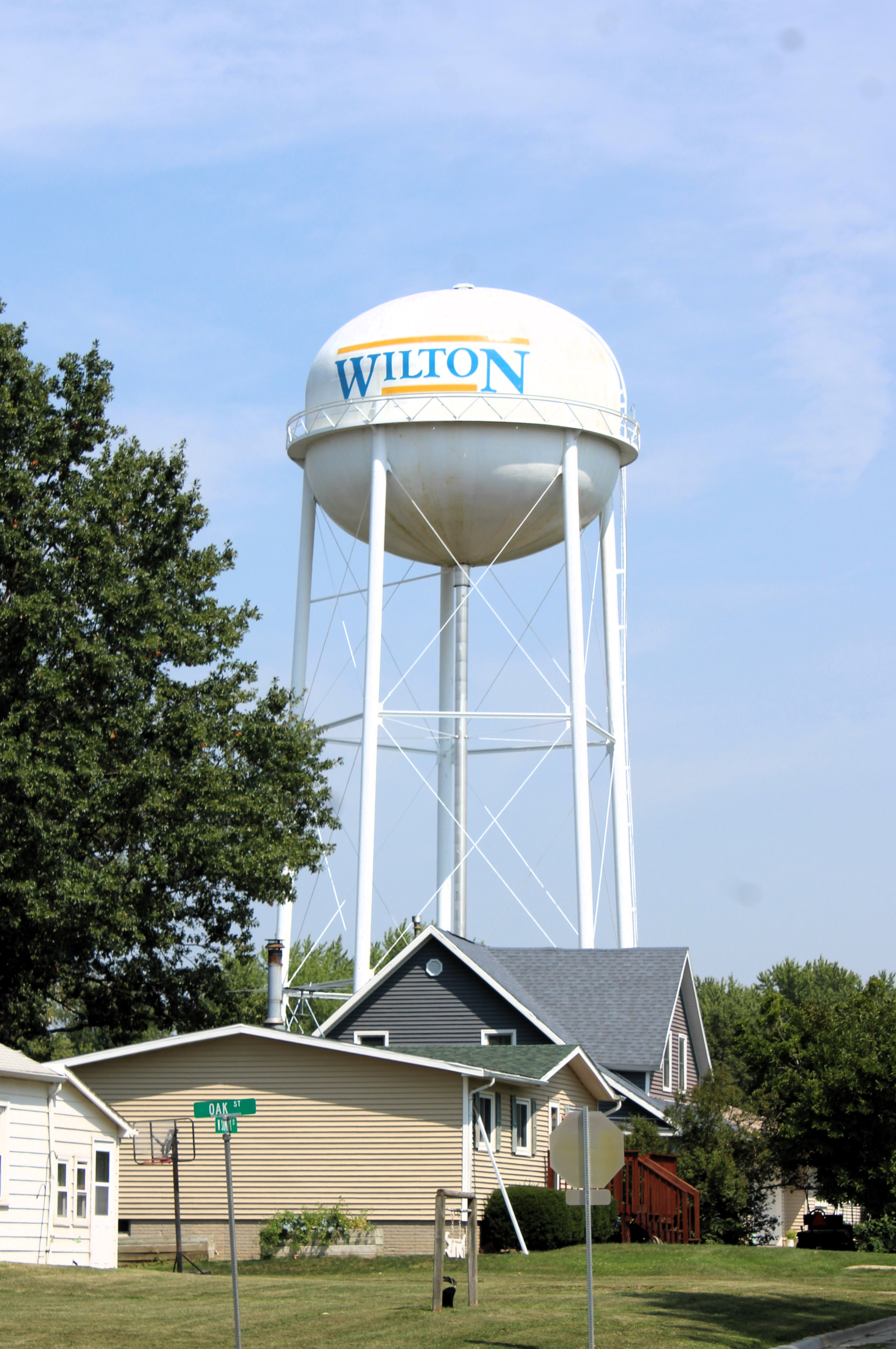
Water tower in Wilton

Electricity is provided by Wilton Municipal Light and Power Company and water by the city water department, which operates its own water treatment plant. The city has a 500,000 gallon water tower on the west side of town near the industrial park, and another 300,000-gallon tower in the center of the city.

=== Healthcare ===
Trinity Medical Center in Muscatine has a "physicians' clinic" located in Wilton. The closest hospitals are located in Muscatine (Trinity-Muscatine), the Quad Cities (Genesis West, Genesis East, Trinity-Bettendorf), and Iowa City (University of Iowa Hospitals and Clinics, Mercy Hospital, and the Veteran's Hospital).

=== Police Department and Fire Department ===
The city is served by the Wilton Police Department and Wilton Fire Department.

== Notable people ==
- Mary Ryerson Butin, physician
- Eddy Chandler, actor
- Charles H. Gabriel, hymnwriter
- Wally Hilgenberg; National Football League player
- Bobby Kaufmann, Iowa state representative
- Jeff Kaufmann, Iowa state representative and chair of the Republican Party of Iowa
- S. J. Mathes, printer and newspaperman
