= Chicago Hospital for Women and Children =

Mary Thompson Hospital
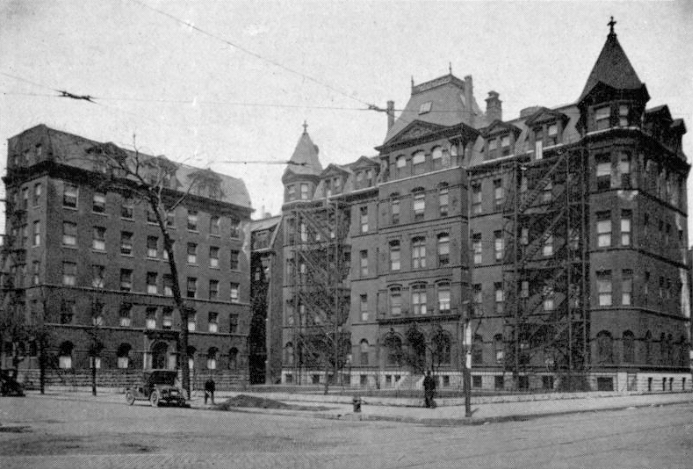
- Mary Thompson Hospital at 1712 West Adams Street in 1922

Geography
- Location: Chicago, Illinois, United States
- Coordinates: 41°53′5.1″N 87°40′2.3″W

Organization
- Patron: Mary Harris Thompson

History
- Former names: Chicago Hospital for Women and Children
- Opened: May 8, 1865
- Closed: 1988

Links
- Lists: Hospitals in Illinois

Chicago Hospital for Women and Children, renamed Mary Thompson Hospital after its founder's death in 1895, was established in 1865 and provided medical care to indigent women and children as well as clinical training to women doctors. It was founded by Mary Harris Thompson, who received her degree in Boston in 1863 from the New England Female Medical College, the first medical school for women.

Thompson established the hospital because of her inability to gain a position at Chicago's two hospitals (one of which refused admittance to women patients).

The hospital treated the wives, widows, and children of Union soldiers and it was funded by donations. The hospital's objectives were:

- To afford a home for women and children among the respectable poor in need of medical and surgical aid
- To treat the same classes at home by an assistant physician
- To afford a free dispensary for the same
- To train competent nurses

An affiliated nursing school was established in 1871.

The hospital building was totally destroyed in the Chicago fire of 1871 and temporary accommodations were set up quickly to deal with the aftermath. In 1872 with a $25,000 commitment from the Chicago Relief and Aid Society a permanent building was purchased. In 1885 a new building was erected on the site.

The hospital was home to several profound medical establishments. In 1930, Chicago's first Mother's Milk Bureau was established. In 1943, the first Cancer Detection Clinic in the Midwest was established. In 1946, the first Mental Hygiene Clinic for Working Women was established and in 1951, the first Cardiac Kitchen in the Midwest was established.

The hospital provided working opportunities for women exclusively until 1972 when men joined the staff. Due to financial issues, it closed in 1988.

== History ==
On May 8, 1865, Mary Harris Thompson founded the Chicago Hospital for Women and Children because women were not yet permitted to be on any of Chicago's hospital staffs. Thompson's objective was to serve widows and orphans of Civil War soldiers who had died in battle. The hospital depended upon the aid of wealthy Chicago women and the support of several medical men. The laywomen raised funds and managed all administrative work. The medical men became consulting physicians who aided Thompson in her medical and surgical practice. These doctors provided Thompson and her institution with the stamp of medical approval required because of a widespread prejudice against women physicians.

With the rapid inflow of patients and Thompson's desire to expand women's roles in the medical field, the hospital underwent some changes. The first facility was small, with fourteen beds, a dispensary, and a pharmacy. During the first five years the hospital treated about two hundred patients and more than five hundred patients visited the dispensary. By July 1869 the facility was not large enough for the amount of incoming patients, so the hospital moved to new quarters with sixteen beds and a larger dispensary. By August 1965, the facility had grown to house 112 beds. Thompson and a fellow doctor, William H. Byford, founded Woman's Hospital Medical College and classes began in 1870. The faculty consisted of nine physicians.

After the school moved its quarters closer to the hospital in October, of 1871, the Great Chicago Fire destroyed the buildings of the college, the hospital, and the homes of most of the faculty. The hospital reopened immediately for burned and sick patients in a private home on Adams Street in Chicago. The college continued classes in an Adams Street residence a few blocks from the hospital. In 1873, the Relief Aid Society of Chicago donated $25,000 for a new building and the hospital reopened that same year along with the dispensary. A house was purchased, renovated, and enlarged for the hospital's construction. A building on the grounds became the medical college and offered Thompson the opportunity to provide training for female nurses. The nursing program was not initiated until 1874 because of limited space. In 1871, the newly established Woman's Hospital Medical College (later renamed the Chicago Woman's Medical College and then the Northwestern University Woman's Medical School) provided Chicago women with access to formal medical education. Women medical students relied on the hospital for clinical observations and demonstrations. Graduates of the school, who seldom gained appointments in male hospitals, became interns, residents, and attending physicians in the hospital.

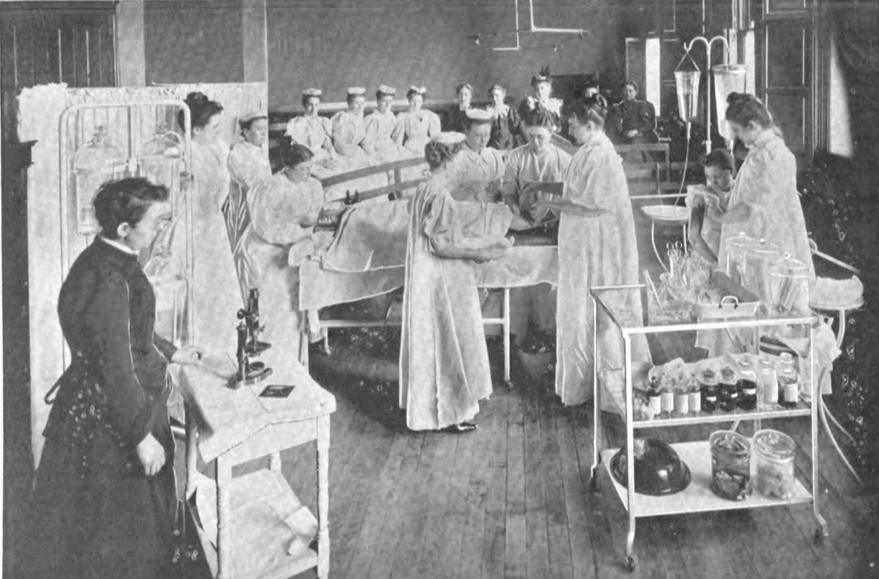
Skin grafting in a surgical clinic at Mary Thompson Hospital. Marie J. Mergler, head physician and surgeon. (1897)

After Thompson's death in 1895, the hospital was renamed the Mary Thompson Hospital for Women and Children. It continued to provide otherwise unavailable clinical opportunities for medical women until 1972, when men were integrated into the staff. In 1892, the faculty sought and secured an alliance with Northwestern University, believing that the relationship would enhance their school's respectability, ensure its longevity, and secure funding to improve teaching and laboratory facilities. Northwestern University refused to invest money in the women's medical school. As resources diminished and other medical schools in Chicago and in the nation began accepting women, the school's ability to meet students' educational needs was threatened and enrollment declined. In 1902, the Northwestern University Woman's Medical School was closed. The demise of the Woman's Hospital Medical College resulted from its success in educating women as physicians and proving that women could become physicians. The Woman's Hospital Medical College convinced other medical schools to remove obstacles to the medical education of women. The hospital soon was under financial constraints, due to the inability of patients to pay their bills. 80 percent of the patients were on some form of Medicare or Medicaid. Mary Thompson's administrators did not foresee these financial problems in 1972 when they spent $3.7 million on additions to the building, that brought the hospital up to its current capacity. In 1977 the hospital underwent extensive renovations, financed by a $3.3 million federal grant and a $3 million bank loan guaranteed by the Federal Housing Administration. In April 1988, officials stated the hospital was closed. The reasons were never completely clear, but the most likely reason was because of the financial problems caused by a lack of patients and inadequate government aid.

Before its closure, the hospital was home to a bronze statue of a young boy, known as Donny Boy. Donny Boy stood over a fountain at the front entrance to the hospital's lobby, greeting those walking in. It is believed that the sculptor of the statue had previously been an ill child named Donny, who was taken to the Chicago Hospital for Women and Children by his widowed mother and received care throughout the duration of his illness. Once he had recovered, Donny grew to adulthood, became an artist and father to a young girl and young boy, both of whom were born at The Chicago Hospital for Women and Children. After the death of Mary Thompson in 1895, Donny sculpted and gifted the bronze statue as a memorial gift to the hospital.

== Nursing ==
After receiving $25,000 for the rebuilding of the hospital by The Relief Aid Society of Chicago, in 1873, a house was purchased, renovated, and enlarged for the hospital, and a building on the property became the new medical college. The new building also gave Doctor Thompson the chance to provide training for women to become nurses. In the hospital's early years the nursing program was not a possibility because of the facility's limited space. In 1874, Thompson began directing a nursing school within the hospital. All women from the Chicago area, and elsewhere, were allowed to attend lectures and, for practical instruction, to spend a certain number of morning hours in the wards daily. This continued until the new building gave better facilities, and since then nurses, whose only occupation was nursing and who could remain in the hospital, were beginning to be taught more in-depth medical procedures and required more training to be part of the nursing occupation. Each undergraduate nurse was required to serve in the several departments for two years, in this way, getting the practical instructions, which she needed to perfect herself as a nurse. The nurses received training in various medical skills, such as securing and cleaning wounds, administering proper type and dosage of a given medication for patients, and numerous other skills.

The school grew with the hospital and Thompson taught mass quantities of women who graduated as nurses. The nursing school allowed Mary Thompson to set standards, and supervise the educational process, but it also gave training to women in another professional area of medicine. A big force that helped push for nurses to be trained in anesthesiology, can be attributed to the highly skilled nurses that were trained through Mary Thompson's nursing program. These nurses were sought after by hospitals all over the country.

On May 8, 1907 a new building for the nursing school was established. Lucy Waite and her assistants supervised the nurses' training. With the new building came more accommodations and a more organized location for the nurses to continue their medical training and education. Like the medical college, the nursing program also shut down. The program was discontinued due to the over supply of nurses in the field in the year 1931 then reopened on July first, 1936. The program ultimately ended in 1988, along with the hospital, due to overwhelming financial issues.

== Medical program ==
After graduating and receiving her medical degree from the New England Female Medical College, Mary Harris Thompson decided to try to establish her practice in Chicago. She found employment working with women and children who lost their husbands and fathers in the Civil War. It wasn't long before she decided to raise money for a hospital to tend to the overwhelming numbers of women and children seeking medical help. The Chicago Hospital for Women and Children opened in 1865. She became the surgeon and top physician. Even though she had a medical degree, she applied to Rush Medical College for more training. The college denied her application until she enlisted the help of William Byford of Chicago Medical College. She graduated in 1870. More women were not able to follow due to numerous objections by male students and faculty. After graduation, she and Byford founded the Woman's Hospital Medical College in connection with her hospital.

Thompson was a professor at the college and also maintained her position at the hospital, becoming one of the best-known women surgeons in the nation. She specialized in pelvic and abdominal surgery and also sought to improve current surgical instruments by inventing her own. Because of her competence, some males in the field who had doubts about women's capacity to practice medicine changed their views. She used her influence to aid women in pursuing careers as physicians.

== Organization ==
=== Hospital staff (as of 1877) ===
From the beginning, the Mary Thompson Hospital was under the direction of a special Board of Trustees. The members of this board were major investors to the hospital. They elect the members of the Board of Councilors, who manage the hospital and its expenses. They also directed the admission of patients, alongside the attending physician, Mary Thompson. The Board of Councilors was made up entirely of females, in addition to all of the medical staff.

=== Officers ===
==== Board of trustees ====
- W. H. Byford, M.D., President
- W. H. Ryder, D.D., Vice-President
- John Crerar, Esq., Secretary
- Gilbert Hubbard, Esq., Treasurer

==== Board of Councilors ====
- Mrs. J. C. Hilton, President
- Mrs. Dyas, Vice-President
- Mrs. H. O. Stone, Vice-President
- Mrs. D. A. Gage, Secretary
- Mrs. Henry Wilkenson, Treasurer

=== Medical staff ===
- Mary H. Thompson, Head Physician and Surgeon
- Sarah Hackett Stevenson, Attending Physician
- Blanche O. Burroughs, Resident Physician

=== Consulting staff ===
- W. Godfrey Dyas
- C. G. Smith
- John Bartlett
- S. C. Blake
- W. E. Clarke
- E. Marguerat
- W. H. Byford
- A. Fisher
- R. G. Bogue
- G. C. Paoli
- F. C. Hotz
- A. H. Foster

=== Dispensary physicians ===
- Mary H. Thompson
- Adelia Barlow
- Margaret Caldwell
- Harriette Bottsford
- Sara H. Stevenson
- Lotta E. Calkins
