= Adolf Weber (ophthalmologist) =

German ophthalmologist (1829–1915)

Adolf Weber (19 June 1829 - 17 July 1915) was a German ophthalmologist.

Weber was born in Giessen. He was a disciple and friend of Albrecht von Graefe. He died in Darmstadt.
