= Mary Harris Thompson =

American surgeon (1829–1895)

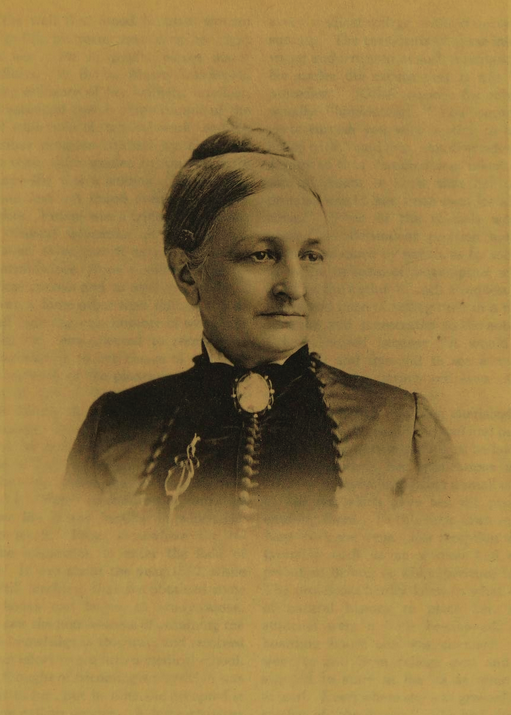
- Born: April 15, 1829; Fort Ann, New York, United States
- Died: May 21, 1895 (aged 66); Chicago, Illinois, United States
- Education: New England Female Medical College
- Known for: Founder of and Physician and Surgeon at Chicago Hospital for Women and Children

Signature
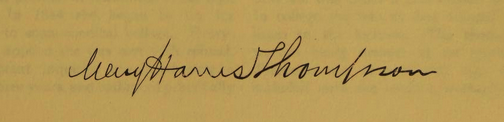

Mary Harris Thompson, MD (April 15, 1829 – May 21, 1895), was the founder, head physician and surgeon of the Chicago Hospital for Women and Children, renamed Mary Harris Thompson Hospital after her death in 1895. She was one of the first women to practice medicine in Chicago where she contributed to the health of civil war veterans families. Over the course of her life she made numerous contributions to science and education that have made a lasting impact.

== Early life and education ==
Thompson was born in Fort Ann, Washington County, New York, on April 15, 1829. She was the daughter of John Harris and Calista Corbin Thompson. She began her studies at a nearby school, then transferred to Fort Edward Institute, New York which offered college preparatory classes among others. She continued her studies at a Methodist school, Troy Conference Academy, located in West Poultney, Vermont, and in 1860 enrolled in classes at the New England Female Medical College in Boston which stands as the oldest medical institution exclusively dedicated to women's learning. During this time she spent one year in an internship at the New York Infirmary for Women and Children, which was founded by physicians Emily and Elizabeth Blackwell. Elizabeth Blackwell holds the distinction of being the first woman to enroll in medical school within the U.S.; she paved the way for generations of women in medicine, including Thompson. Thompson received her medical degree in 1863 from the first medical school for women. In 1890, the Chicago Medical College granted a degree ad eundem to Thompson.

== Career ==
Upon graduating from the New England Female Medical College, Thompson moved to Chicago, a city which had been founded only 30 years prior and with little competition for a woman physician. She initially worked in the Northwestern Sanitary Commission's Chicago branch (a branch of the United States Sanitary Commission) for William G. Dyas and Miranda Dyas, serving Civil War veterans' families in Chicago. During this phase of her career, Thompson was limited in her ability to care for patients; women were not yet permitted to be on any of Chicago's hospital staffs, and at least one area hospital did not admit women as patients.

She then founded her own hospital, with the assistance of Rev. William R. Ryder, who raised funds for the project. In May, 1865, the Chicago Hospital for Women and Children opened, and Thompson became chief surgeon and physician, and head of staff – positions she kept the rest of her life. She had very quickly emerged as the sole women in Chicago to perform major surgical procedures. Alongside being a surgeon and physician, Thompson made other medical contributions such as inventing surgical instruments including the abdominal needle which was utilized by many other medical professionals.

In 1870, Thompson founded Woman's Hospital Medical College. She soon became one of initial nine faculty members, and served in this role until 1879, when the college separated from the hospital. In 1874, she began directing a nursing school within the hospital and in 1892, she joined the faculty of the Northwestern University Woman's Medical School as a clinical professor of gynaecology.

After 10 years of practice, Thompson was admitted to the Chicago Medical Society in 1873 where she became the organization's vice president, and its first female officer, in 1886. She was a member of the American Medical Association (AMA), and the AMA's first woman to present a paper to the Section on Diseases of Children, which earned her the distinct role of Section Chair. She published and presented several papers on women's health and childhood diseases during her career which had lasting impacts in the medical field. Thompson's private practice as an abdominal and pelvic surgeon was part of her hospital work, and for years she was the sole woman performing major surgery in Chicago.

== Great Chicago Fire ==
In 1871, the Great Chicago Fire burned down the buildings of the Woman's Hospital Medical College and the Chicago Hospital for Women and Children. The fire not only hit the hospital but also left numerous buildings, peoples homes, and businesses burned and affected. It ultimately covered and expanse of around 2,000 acres of rubble and destruction in its wake. Thompson and her staff ensured her patients were cared for, and soon after reopened for burned and sick patients, male and female, in a private home on Adams street. In 1873, the Relief Aid Society of Chicago donated $25,000 to reopen the hospital and treat patients, and Thompson used the money to open in a new location that same year. Along with the reopening of the hospital, many others in the community began to rebuild what the Chicago fire took, some making use of fireproof materials and others rebuilding with whatever materials were available to them.

== Death ==
Thompson died May 21st in 1895 at age sixty-six, suffering from an unexpected cerebral hemorrhage. Shortly after her death, on June 27th in 1895 the board of the Chicago Hospital for Women and Children legally renamed the hospital the Mary Thompson Hospital of Chicago for Women and Children. The hospital closed in 1988 which was partly attributed to financial issues that made it difficult to keep open and running. In 1903, the hospital board gave the Art Institute of Chicago a marble sculpture titled Bust of Mary Harris Thompson that they commissioned from sculptor Daniel Chester French. Thompson is buried in Fort Ann Cemetery in Fort Ann, New York together with four of her siblings, having made so many lasting advancements in the medical field.
