= McKibbin =

McKibbin is an Irish surname. Notable people with the surname include:

- Aaron McKibbin (born 1991), English Paralympic table tennis player
- Alan McKibbin (1892–1958), Northern Ireland politician
- Alexander McKibbin (1891 — 1966), British spy
- Brendan McKibbin (born 1985), Scottish rugby player
- David B. McKibbin (1831–1890), American army officer
- John McKibbin (1947–2016), American politician
- Joseph C. McKibbin (1824–1896), American politician
- Nikki McKibbin (1978-2020), American singer-songwriter
- Ross McKibbin (born 1942), historian of Britain
- Tom McKibbin (1870–1939), Australian cricketer
- Tom McKibbin (born 2002), Northern Irish golfer
- Warwick McKibbin (born 1957), Australian economist

== See also ==
- 248 McKibbin
- Industrial Complex at 221 McKibbin Street
- McKibben (disambiguation)
