= McKibbin Street Lofts =

Apartment buildings in Brooklyn, New York

Coordinates: 40.7058°N 73.9378°W

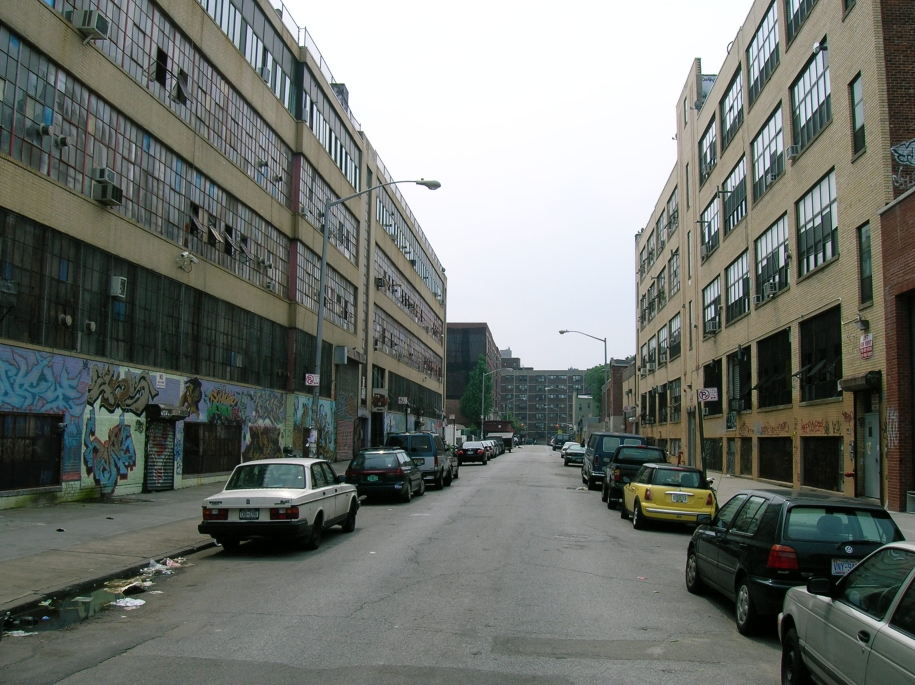
255 McKibbin St. (right) and 248 McKibbin St. (left) in 2006

The McKibbin Street Lofts are two opposing loft buildings in East Williamsburg, Brooklyn. They share similar features, such as 5 floors (16 apartments per floor at 255 and 20 at 248). The apartments range in size from 400 to 2500 square feet (various units between the first and second floors of both buildings are duplexes). Approximately 400 tenants live in the two buildings.

The building used to have a reputation for hosting raucous all-night "loft parties." Given this, and the preponderance of twenty-something recent college graduates living in the two buildings, the buildings had at one point been given the nickname "Art Dorm." With young-professional residents and extensive construction underway at both buildings, this reputation is changing.

== History ==
The building was constructed in 1936 and served as a factory space manufacturing various textiles and garments including a pioneer in light fixture manufacturing until 1998, when it was converted into residential lofts. There were actually several buildings, which collectively came to be known as the McKibbin Lofts.

On July 4, 2005, at approximately 11 AM, at 255 McKibbin Street, apartment number 222 (304 in the new numbering) exploded, causing major structural, smoke, and water damage to surrounding units. The explosion is thought to have been caused by the combustion of wood sealant vapor. Apartment 222 had recently been vacated, and was being refurbished by the building's management; the wood floor had been coated with sealant, and left unattended to saturate. When sealant vapor reached the pilot light of the unit's stove (which had not been turned off), it exploded. The windows and metal window frames in 222 were ripped out of the building's brick walls.

A New York Times article in 2008 said that each building contained "perhaps 300 people", most of whom were in their twenties or younger. The lofts each contained up to eight people, with monthly rents varying between $375 and $800.

On July 19, 2011, FBI agents raided 255 McKibbin Apt 510 looking for members of vigilante group Anonymous. Former residents from rock band Broken Glow were mentioned in a New York Post article as possible suspects, though no further action was taken against the musicians.

As of 2021, the McKibbin Street Lofts share the block with a range of buildings including a school, PS 147, a recycling redemption center Sure We Can, and the Industrial Complex at 221 McKibbin Street. Curbed wrote in 2022 that the McKibbin Lofts had to hire superintendents frequently because the position had a high turnover rate. In addition, the magazine wrote that the buildings were so poorly managed that they suffered from leaks and infestations of maggots and bedbugs.

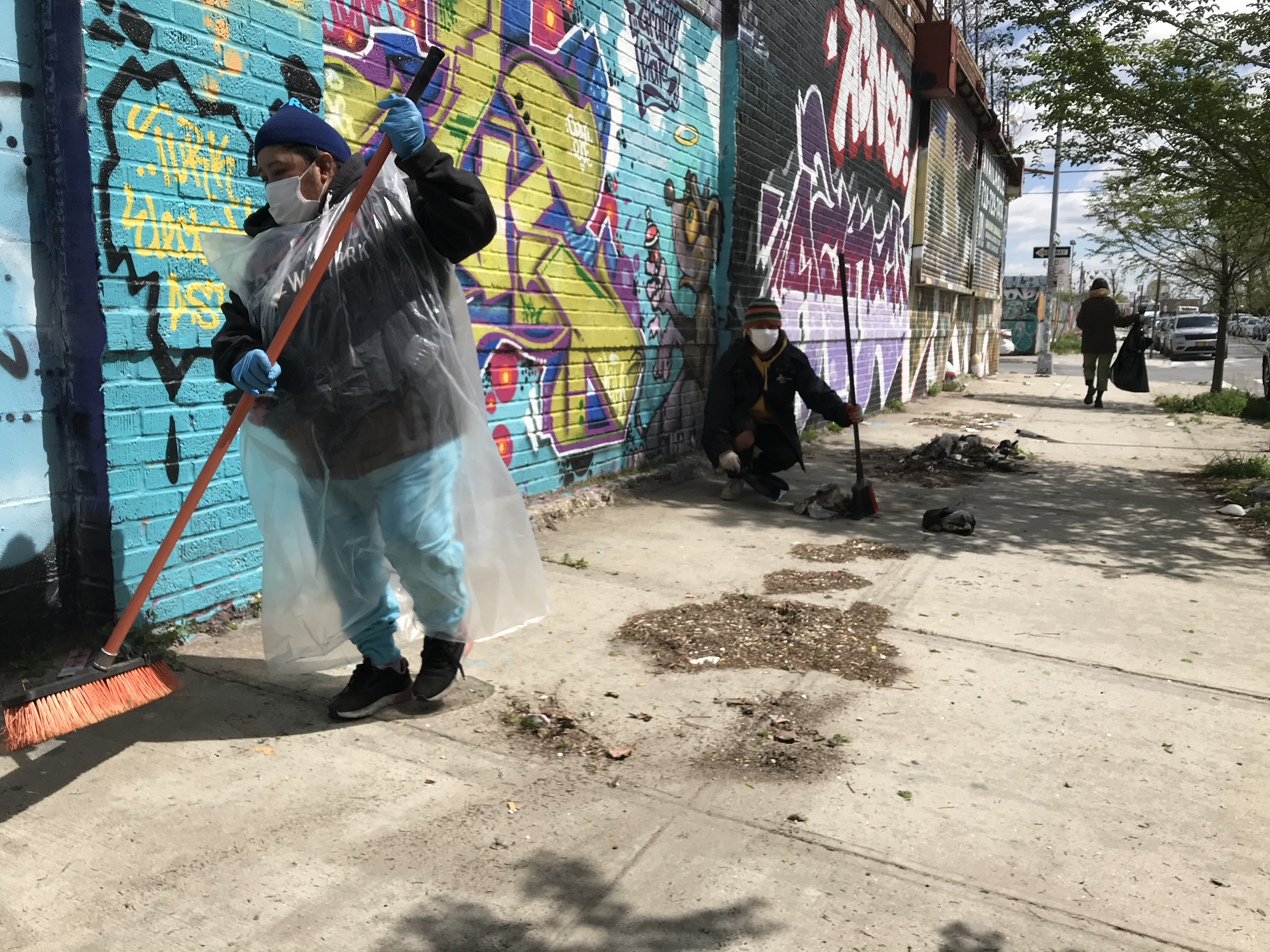
Volunteers at Sure We Can clean McKibbin Street in front of McKibbin Street Lofts on Earth Day 2021

== Notable spaces ==
Until late 2012, 255 was home to LEGroom, a loft event space. Currently, The Chocolate Factory theater and visual art organization throws biweekly events.

=== Cafe at 248 McKibbin ===
Potion Cafe was in the middle of 248 McKibbin. Open 6 days a week (closed on Wednesdays), the cafe had a wide variety of food and beverages. On Mondays, there was an open-microphone night attended by many local singer-songwriters, hip hop artists, poets, with performers from all over the world appearing. Potion Cafe has recently reopened and the collective is hosted regularly by "The G" until its closure, but the core members have continued to host the open mic at The Tea Factory Lofts and the cafe is now open 7 days a week (175 Stockholm Street). The progressive-rock band of the same name resides in upstate New York.

As of July 2012 the unit previously holding the Potion Cafe has been undergoing construction. In February 2013, a sign was posted advertising another business, two4eight, will take over the spot. As of July 2013 two4eight is operating a bakery and coffee shop in the location 7 days a week. In early 2014 two4eight has closed. The owners of Lit Lounge will be opening a cafe / bar as well as an event space. The cafe is slated to open March 16. On March 16, 2014, Currant Cafe was opened.

== Loft law ==
As of January 2020 only the 4th and 5th floors of 255 McKibbin have a certificate of occupancy valid for residential occupancy. The remaining floors have been submitted for inclusion in the 2010 Loft Law. This process was initiated by the building management.

In February 2012 most residents of the 1st (technical basement) 2nd and third floors of 255 McKibbin received copies of the Narrative Statement outlined in the Loft Law. On July 9, 2012 the Loft Board revoked registration for units 101, 102, 103, 109 and 110 due to those units being located in the basement.

== The Bone Museum ==
Founded October 30, 2023, under the management of JonsBones The Bone Museum is a specialized institution focused on the study of the medical bone trade and human osteology. Its collection comprises full skeletons, a spine wall, and over a hundred skulls, serving as a resource for medical professionals, students, artists, and the general public. The exhibits emphasize the historical significance of the medical bone trade, offering insights into the evolving understanding of osteology. Access to the museum is facilitated through Studio 14, providing an opportunity for those interested in the comprehensive study of human anatomy.
