= Dormer =

Structural element of a building

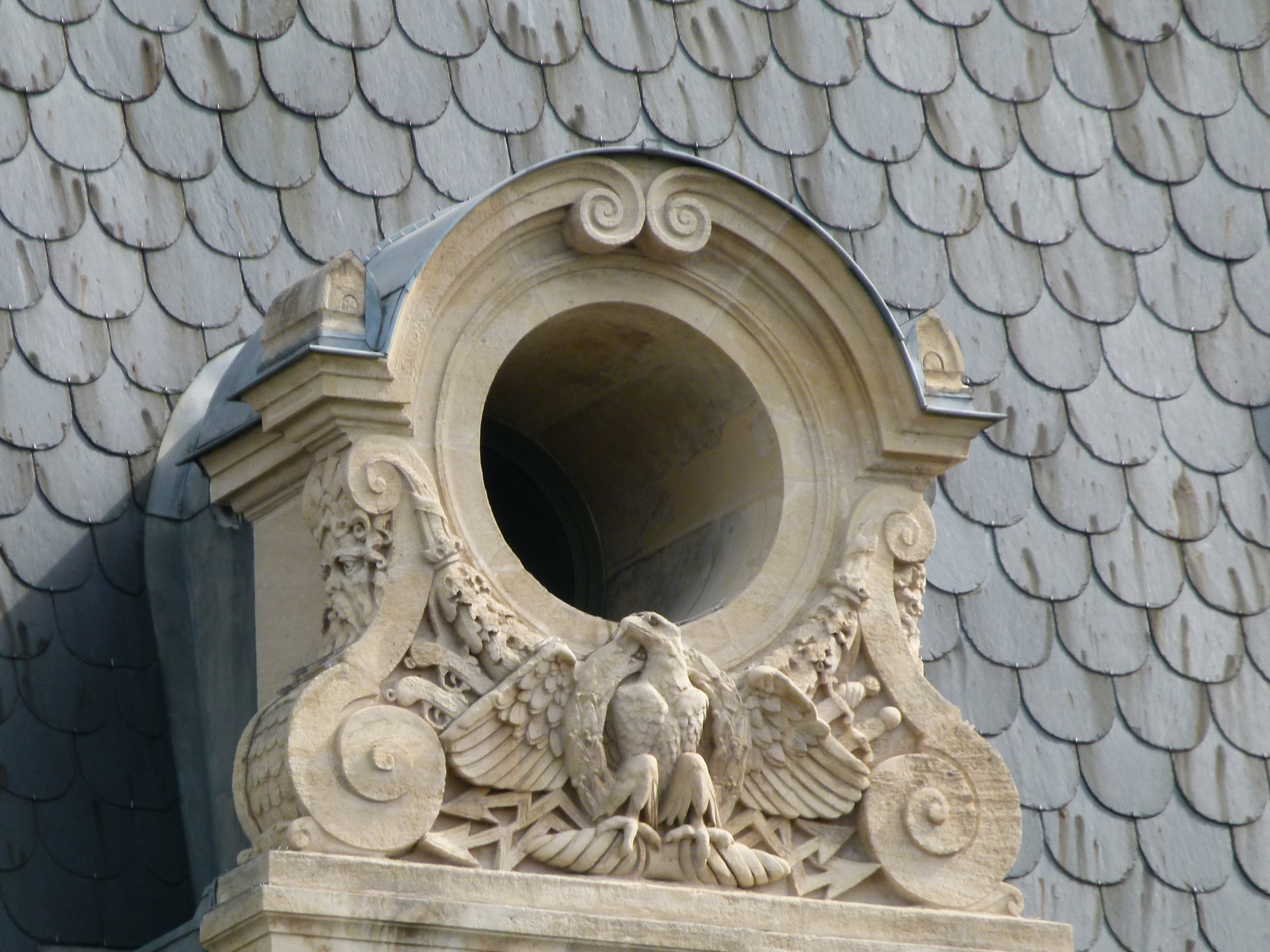
Dormer window of the Building of Préfecture de police de Paris (île de la Cité)

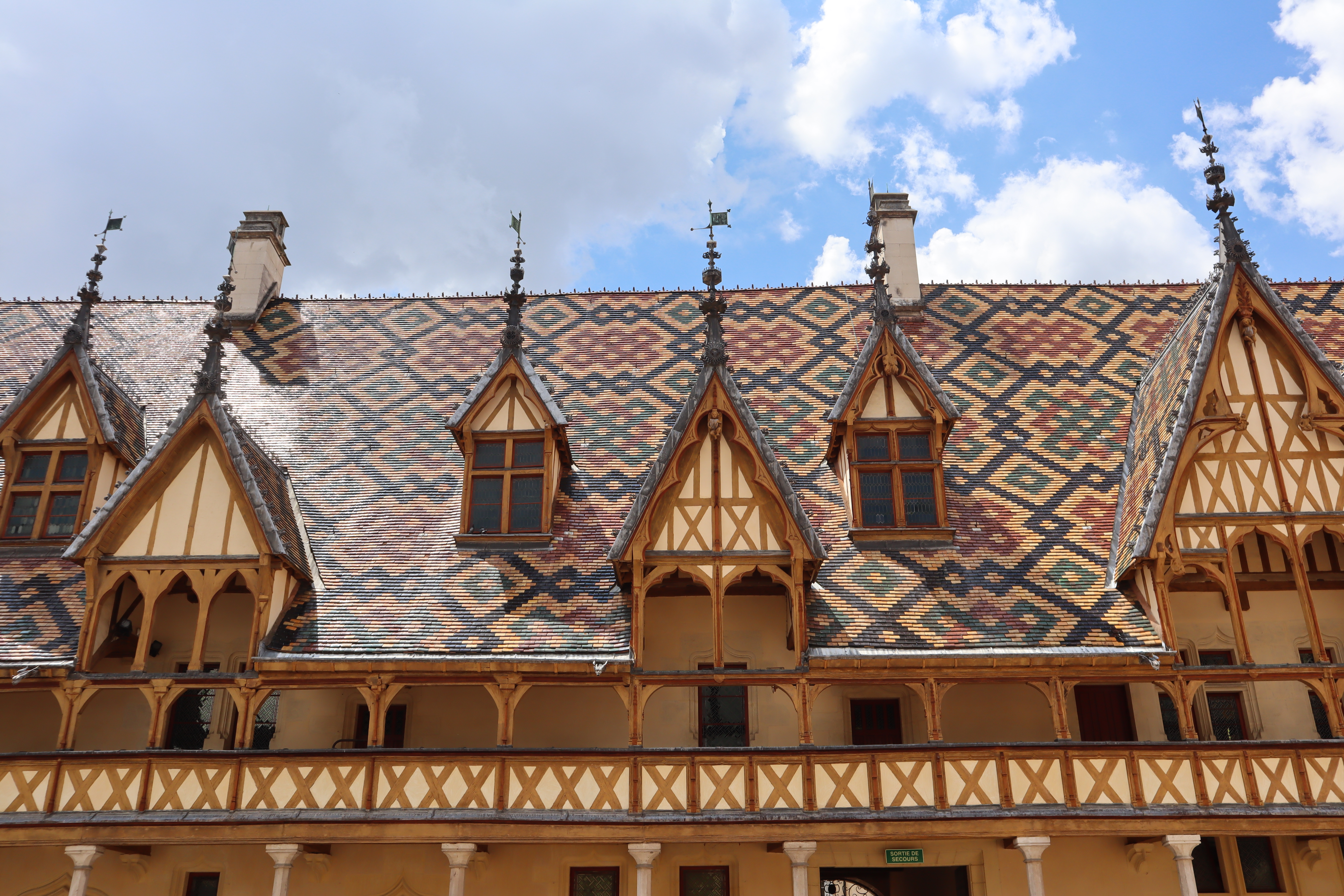
Gable dormers at Hospices de Beaune in Beaune, France

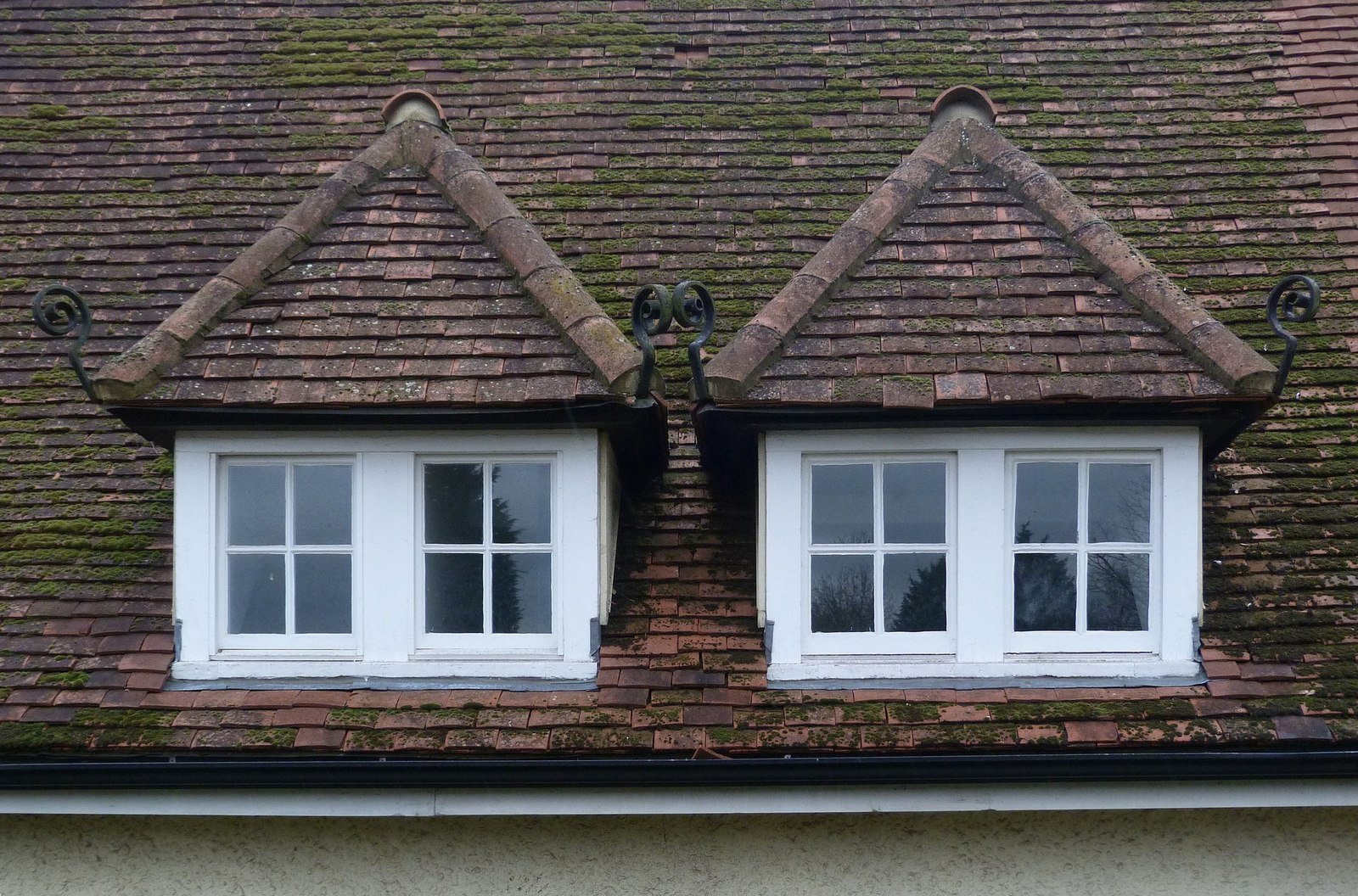
Pair of hip roof dormer windows on the Howard Memorial Hall, Letchworth

A dormer is a roofed structure, often containing a window, that projects vertically beyond the plane of a pitched roof. A dormer window (also called dormer) is a form of roof window.

Dormers are commonly used to increase the usable space in a loft and to create window openings in a roof plane. A dormer is often one of the primary elements of a loft conversion. As a prominent element of many buildings, different types of dormer have evolved to complement different styles of architecture. When the structure appears on the spires of churches and cathedrals, it is usually referred to as a lucarne.

== History ==
The word dormer is derived from the Middle French dormeor, meaning "sleeping room", as dormer windows often provided light and space to attic-level bedrooms.

One of the earliest uses of dormers was in the form of lucarnes, slender dormers which provided ventilation to the spires of English Gothic churches and cathedrals. An early example are the lucarnes of the spire of Christ Church Cathedral, Oxford. Dormer windows have been used in domestic architecture in Britain since the 16th century.

Dormer windows were popularised by French architect François Mansart, who used dormers extensively in the mansard roofs he designed for 17th-century Paris.

Today dormers are a widespread feature of pitched roof buildings.

== Types ==
Some of the different types of dormer are:

Gable-fronted dormer
Also called simply a gabled dormer, this is the most common type. It has a simple pitched roof of two sloping planes, supported by an outward face (any combination of glazed and unglazed materials). It thus includes a triangular section below the roofline, i.e. a gable. It is also known as a dog-house dormer (due to its similar shape).
Hip roof dormer
Also called a hipped dormer, it has a roof composed of three sloping planes that rise from each side of the dormer frame and converge at the ridge—analogous to the hip roof.
Flat roof dormer
The roof of this dormer is a single flat plane approximately horizontal (although usually slightly inclined to allow rain water to run off).
Shed dormer
This dormer also has a single flat plane roof, but in this case, it is sloped in the same direction as the principal roof, only at a shallower angle. A shed dormer can provide head room over a larger area than a gabled dormer, but as its roof pitch is shallower than the main roof, it may require a different roof covering.
Wall dormer
As opposed to the dormer being set part way up the slope of the roof, this is a dormer whose face is coplanar with (shares the horizontal position of) the face of the wall below. This means that the face of the dormer is essentially a continuation of the wall above the level of the eaves. Later structures (during the period of revival styles in 19th-century architecture) feature wall dormers as an important part of eclectic assemblies of elements that make up such styles as New World Queen Anne Revival architecture and the French-inspired Châteauesque style.
Eyebrow or eyelid dormer
A low and wide dormer with a curved roof and no sides. Instead, the roof covering is gradually curved up and over the dormer in a flattened bell curve.
Link dormer
This can be a dormer that houses a chimney or a dormer that joins one part of a roof to another.
Bonneted dormer
An arched roof dormer, rounded in shape when viewed from front. Popular in Victorian homes, especially in certain areas, like the Southcott-style row-houses called Jellybean Row in St. John's, Newfoundland.
Nantucket dormer
A three-in-one dormer structure composed of two gable dormers connected by a shed dormer in between.
Lucarne
A dormer on the slope of a Gothic spire, usually slender and gable-fronted.
Blind or false dormer
A dormer that is only external; it provides no light and may provide no space internally. Often used to make the building appear more aesthetic.

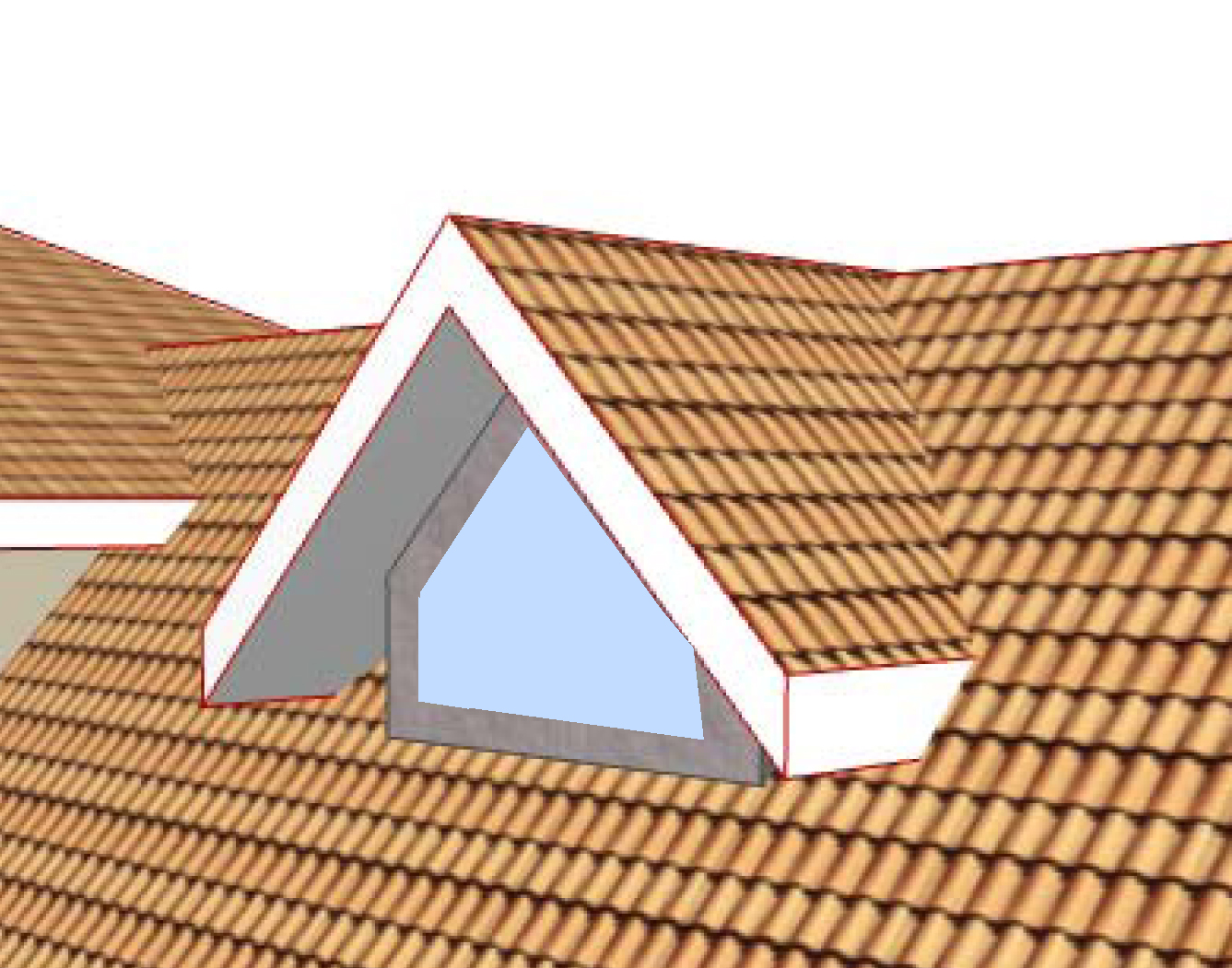
Gable-fronted dormer (shallow instance wholly glazed)

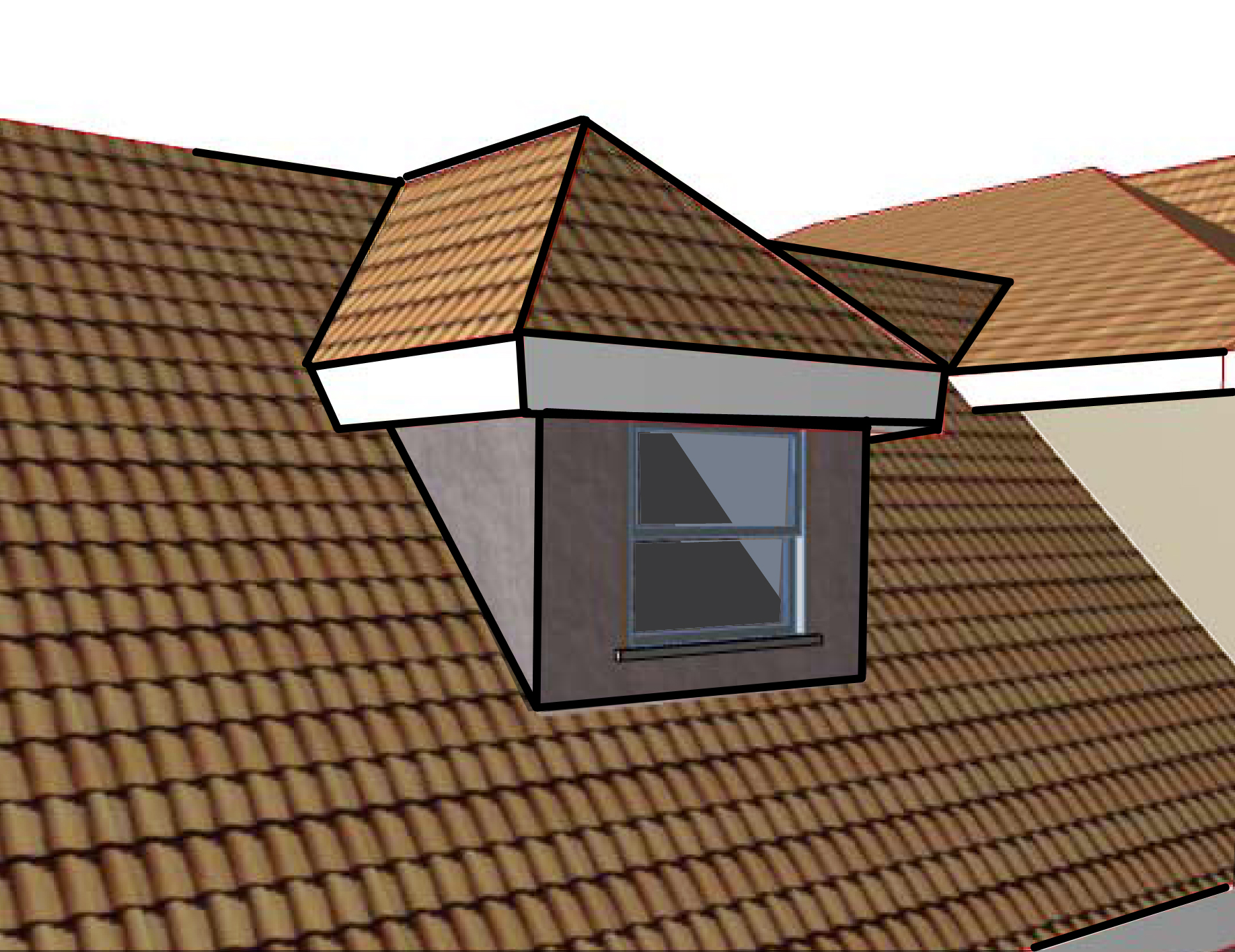
Hip roof dormer

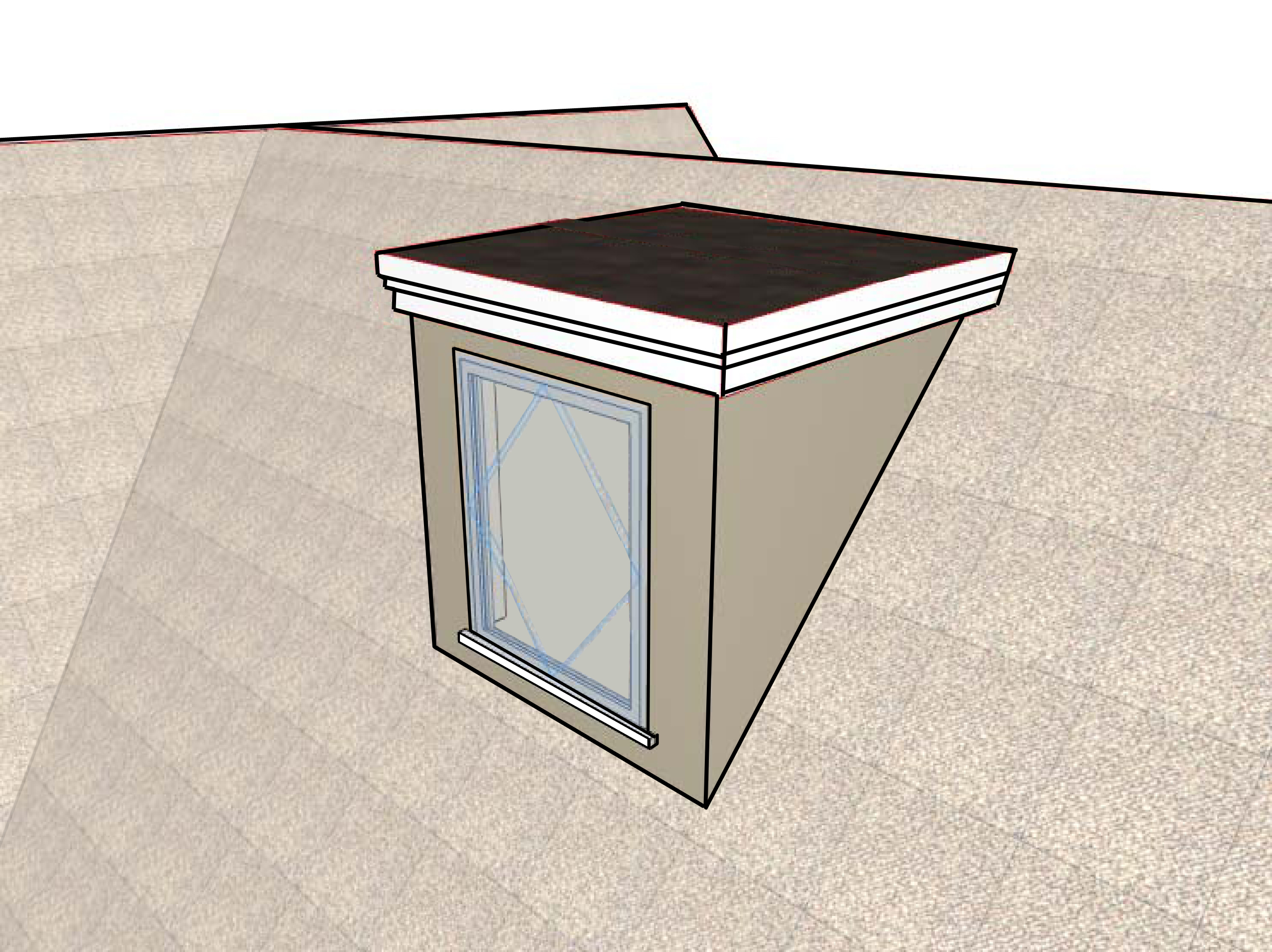
Flat roof dormer

Shed dormer

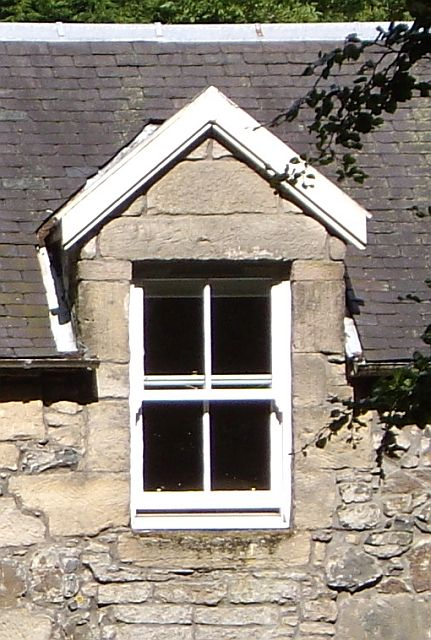
Wall dormer

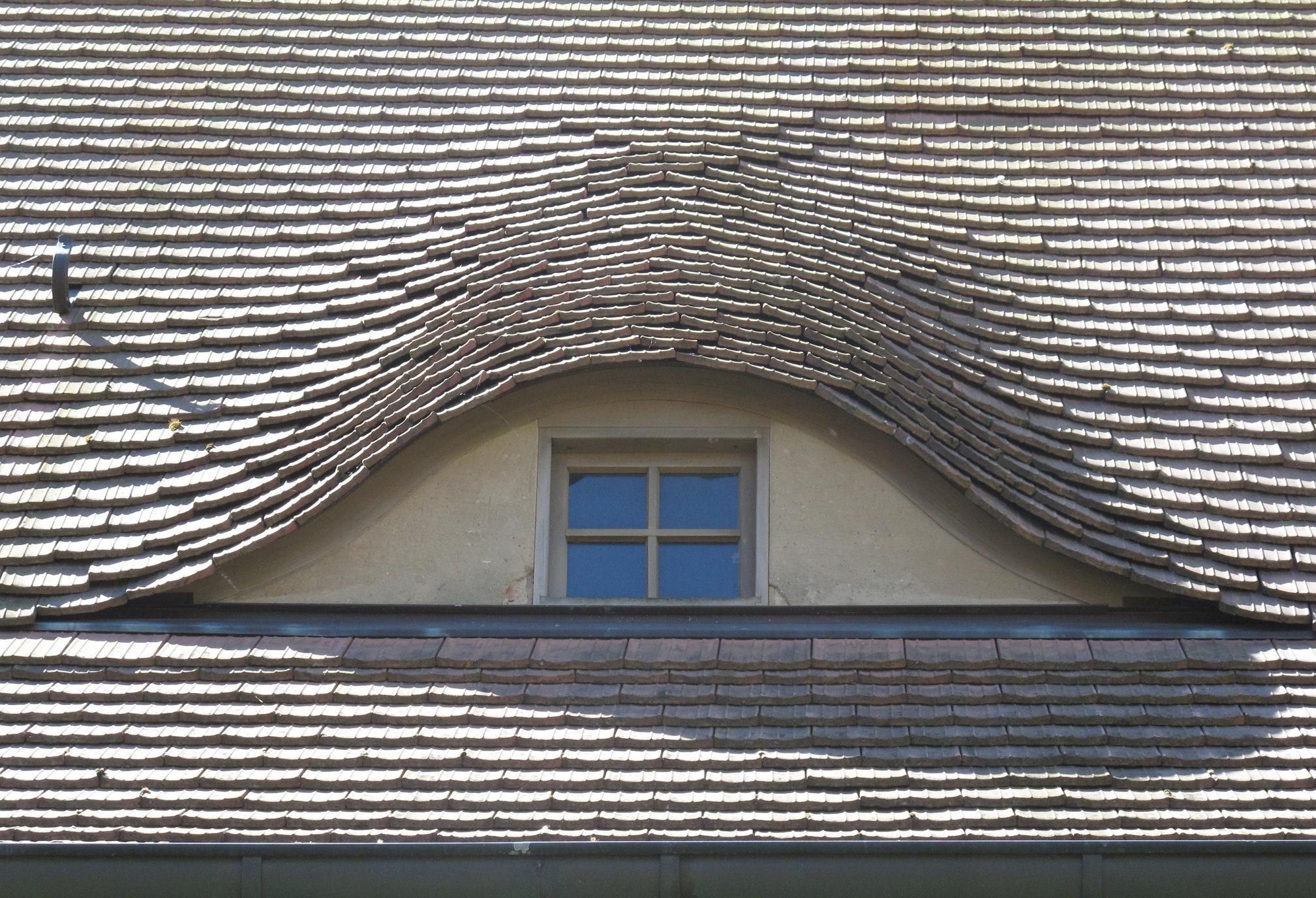
Eyebrow dormer

Link dormer

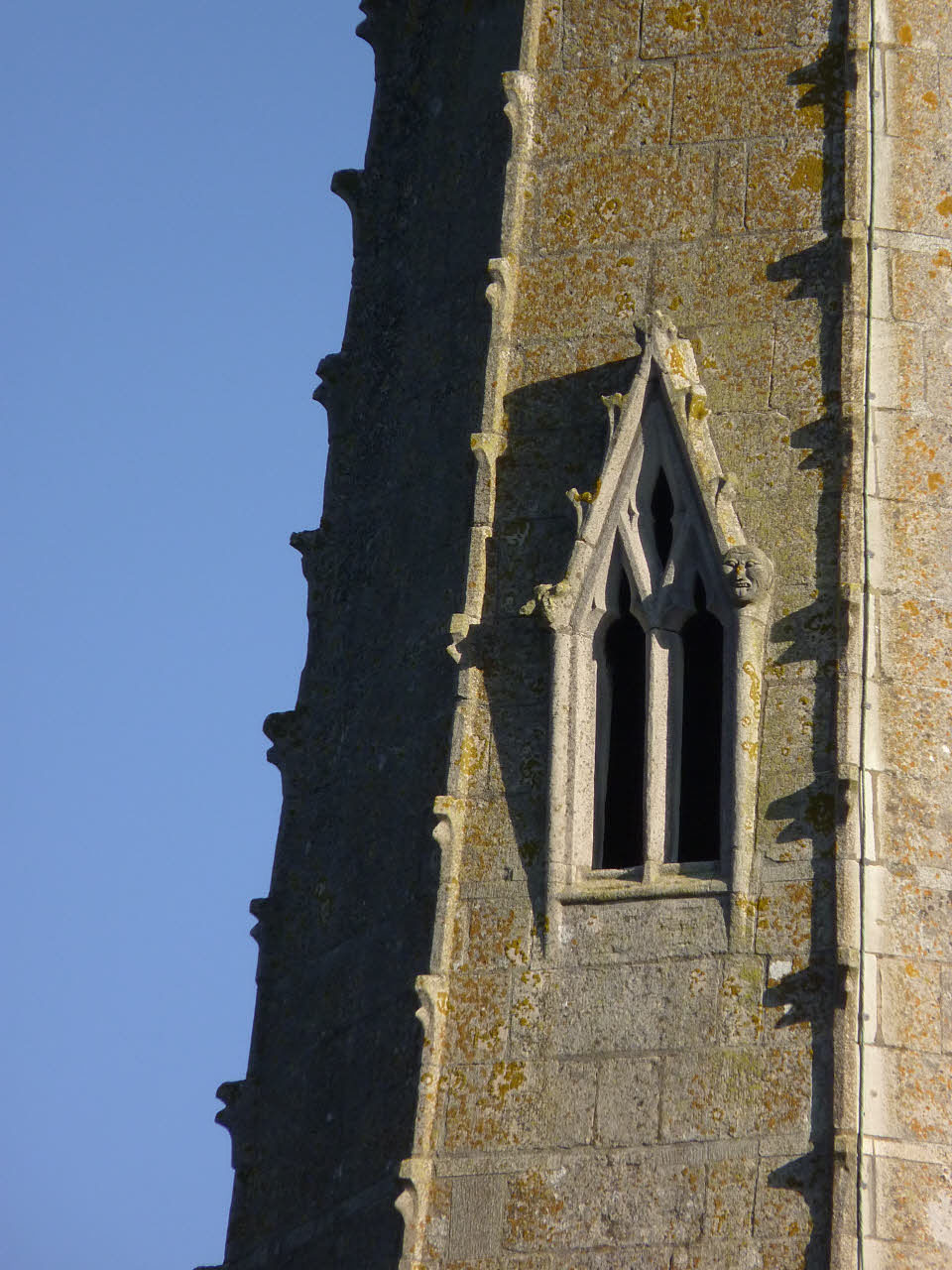
Lucarne on a church spire

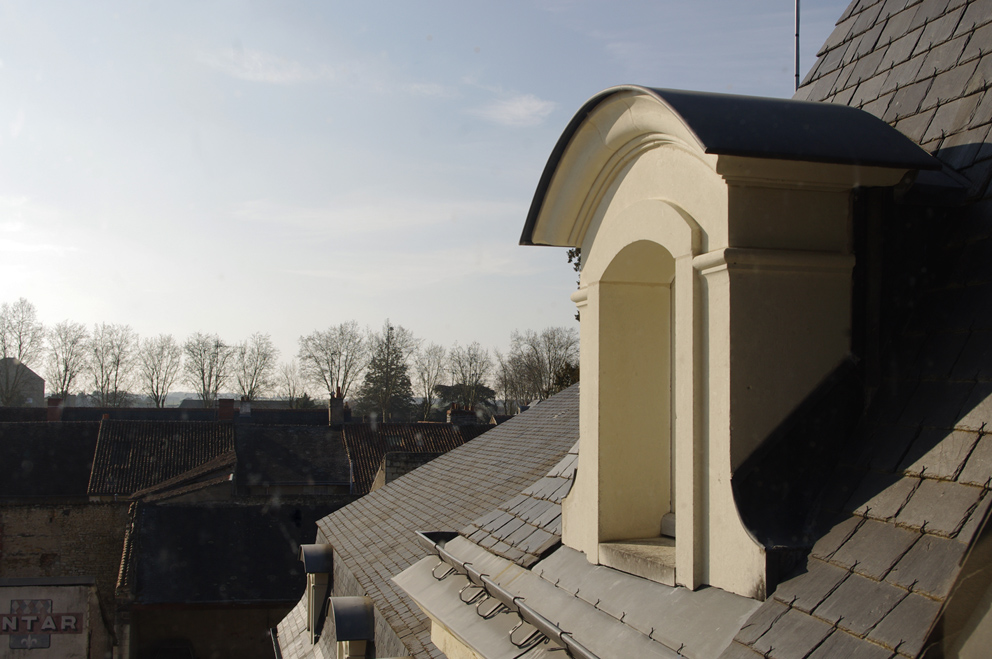
Bonneted dormer

== Requirements for permission to construct ==
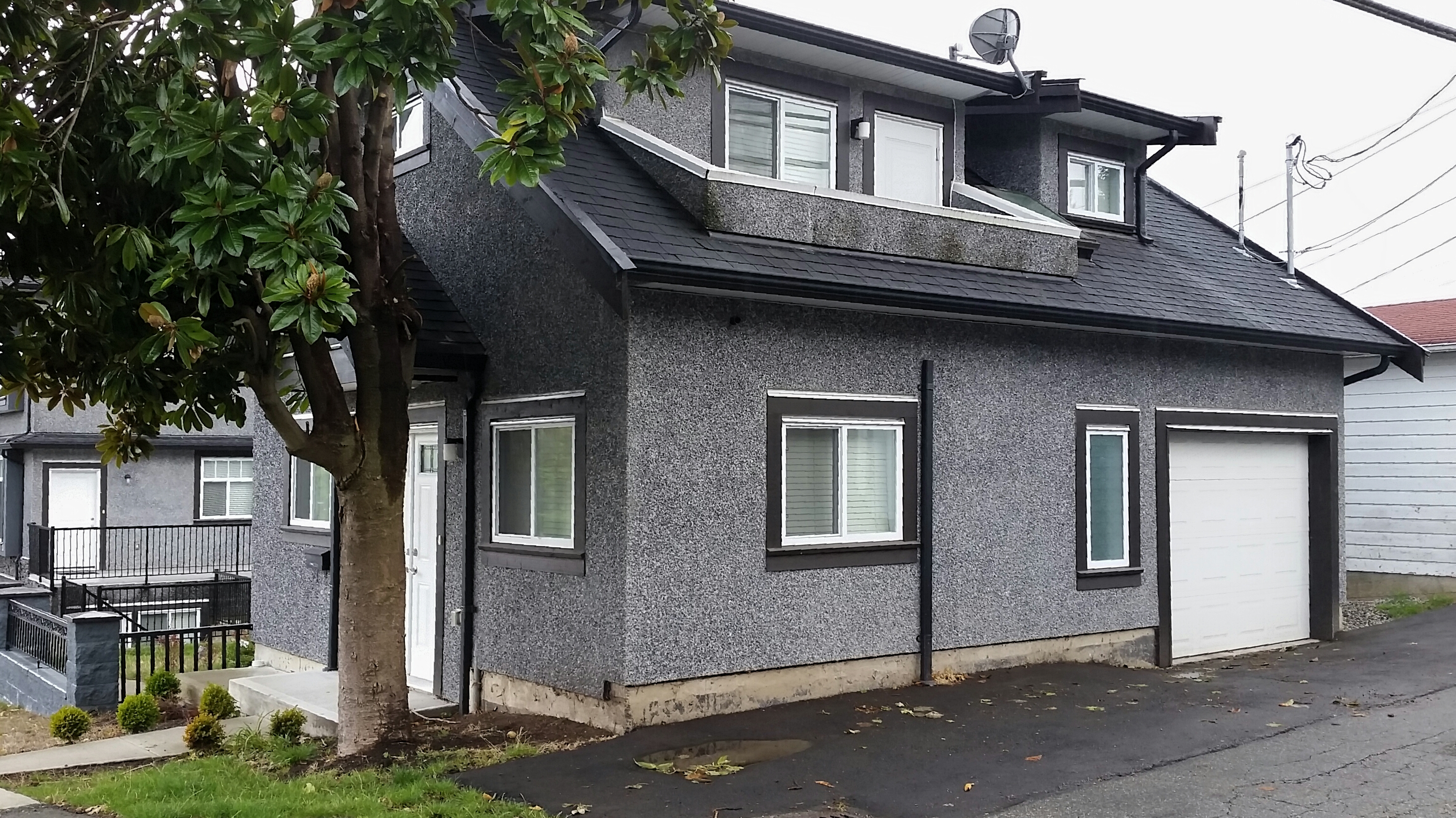
Laneway house in Vancouver with set-back dormers. Because of the relatively small size, dormers are very popular on laneway houses.

In some localities, permission must be sought for construction of dormers and other features. In England and Wales, the General Permitted Development Order states classes of development for which such planning permission is not required. Such rights are only applicable outside conservation areas, national parks, Areas of Outstanding Natural Beauty or The Broads. Dormers may introduce imbalance in the street scene and be seen as inappropriate within the local setting of streets and buildings.

In Vancouver, there are regulations for laneway houses stating the minimum setback of the face of the dormer from the wall below, with exceptions. This is to prevent overshadowing neighbouring yards.

== Popularity ==
Dormers are popular in Ulster, and commonly used to create extra space when a loft is converted into a habitable room.

== See also ==
- Bungalow
- Mansard roof
- Vernacular architecture
