= McKibben =

McKibben is an Irish and Scottish surname. Notable people with the surname include:

- Bill McKibben (born 1960), American environmentalist and author
- Chip McKibben (born 1965), American rower
- Chuck McKibben (born 1947), American voice actor
- Glenn Arthur McKibben, New Zealand police officer killed in 1996
- Howard D. McKibben (born 1940), American jurist
- Larry McKibben (1947–2025), American politician
- Matty McKibben, fictional character in the American TV series Awkward
- Ray McKibben (1945–1968), American soldier and Medal of Honor recipient
- Samuel N. McKibben, 19th century American after whom the S. M. McKibben House is named
- Sherry McKibben (1944–2014), Canadian politician and social worker

== See also ==
- McKibben artificial muscle
- Mount McKibben
- McKibbin (disambiguation)
