= L. I. Geltischeva Mansion =

Coordinates: 55.7448°N 37.6304°E

Mansion L. I. Geltischeva
- Особняк Л. И. Гельтищевой
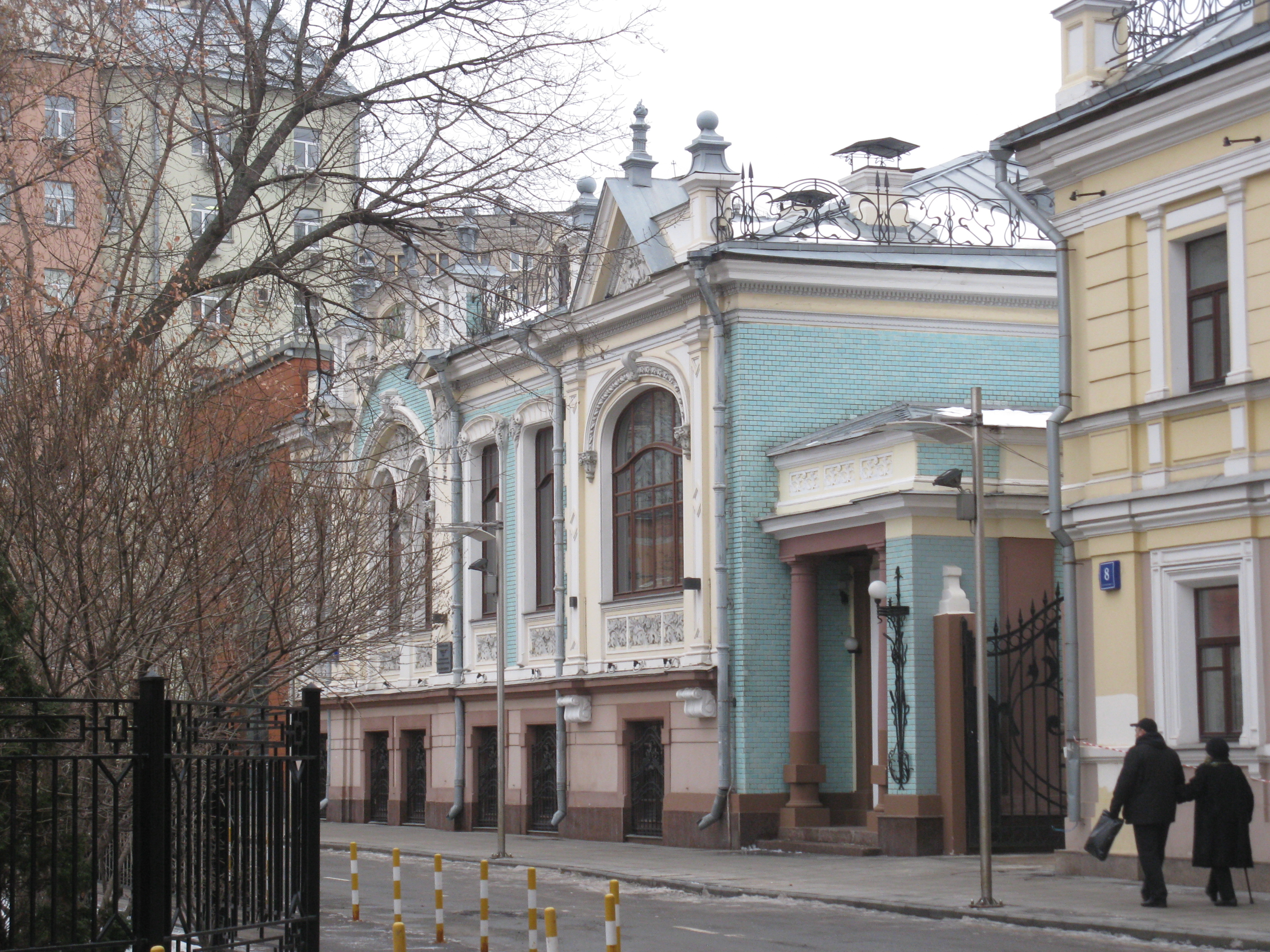
- Location: Moscow, Average Ovchinnikovsky Lane, Building 8, Building 1
- Designer: F. F. Voskresensky
- Completion date: 1904
- Opening date: 1904

The L. I. Geltischeva Mansion (Russian: Особняк Л. И. Гельтищевой) is a building in the center of Moscow (Average Ovchinnikovsky Lane, Building 8, Building 1). It was built in 1904 by the architect F. F. Voskresensky in the Art Nouveau style. L. I. Geltischeva's mansion has the status of an object of cultural heritage of federal significance.

== History ==
In 1834, the merchant's son Stebnev built a two-story stone house in the middle Ovchinnikovsky lane. By the beginning of the 20th, this house belonged to L. I. Geltischeva. By his order, architect F. F. Voskresensky substantially rebuilt the mansion. The former Stebnev's house became its middle part, and extensions were added to its sides.

== Architecture ==
The mansion of L. I. Geltischeva is one of the brightest examples of Moscow's modern architecture. The design widely uses vegetable motifs. The facade of the small building is covered with turquoise glazed tiles. In the frames of the windows, there are many molded decorative details (such as leaves and flowers of burdock). The niche of the main entrance is decorated with columns of the Tuscan order. On the roof, there are roof windows of unusual shapes. Several attics with balloons have been installed on the attic, as well as a decorative torch on the stand.

In the center of the main facade is a two-part "Italian" window, consisting of two semi-circular windows united by an arched niche. Above this window, a mosaic panel is placed on the attic, in which orchids are depicted on a gold ground. The monogram of L. Ya. Geltischeva, the owner of the mansion, is visible on the facade. The windows of the basement floor are covered with wrought iron bars with iris flowers. The interior of the building has remained almost unchanged. It is decorated with the use of ceramics, metal parts, and stucco.
