= 2009 Loft Law Amendment =

New York State Legislature
- Territorial extent: Any city in New York (state) at least 1 million. Effectively limited to New York City
- Enacted by: New York State Legislature
- Enacted: June 21, 2010

Amends
- 1982 Loft Law

Loft Law Amendment (also referred to as Expanded Loft Law) is a New York law that created a new window period for recognition of loft tenants that previously did not qualify under the original 1982 Loft Law.

The purpose of this bill is to extend provisions of the Loft Law to buildings which have been occupied residentially for 12 consecutive months during the period starting January 1, 2008 and ending December 31, 2009.

== Legislative history ==
Senator Martin Malave Dilan introduced the "Expanded Loft Law" in the Senate in 2010. The 2010 version of the bill is coded as S7178A. The bill was amended in May 2010 and passed in the New York State Assembly (A05667C) on June 3, 2010. On June 8, 2010, the New York State Senate passed the “Expanded Loft Law”, bill S7178A. The bill was signed into law by New York Governor David Paterson on June 21, 2010.

== Provisions ==
- Amends the definition of loft dwellings to include commercial or manufacturing buildings occupied for residential purposes for 12 consecutive months from January 1, 2008, to December 31, 2009, and extends Loft Law protections to tenants in such buildings
- Requires non-residential space in such buildings to be offered for residential use only after a residential certificate of occupancy has been obtained for such space
- Requires owners of loft buildings to achieve compliance with the standards of safety and fire protection, and take reasonable and necessary action to obtain certificate of occupancy as a class A multiple dwelling for the residential portion of the building
- Authorizes the Loft Board to extend any compliance deadline that an owner is unable to meet for reasons beyond his or her control
- Authorizes the Loft Board, upon good cause shown, to extend the time of compliance twice with the requirement to obtain a residential certificate of occupancy for periods not to exceed 12 months each
- Allows owners of such buildings to apply to the Loft Board for an exemption of a building if the owner can show it would cause an unjustifiable hardship
- Provides that these interim multiple dwellings become subject to the New York City Rent Stabilization Law after they are legalized
- Makes the Loft Law permanent
