= 1982 Loft Law =

New York regulation of residential lofts

New York State Legislature
- Long title: Article 7-C of the New York Multiple Dwelling Law
- Territorial extent: Any city in New York State with at least 1 million residents. Effectively limited to New York City.
- Enacted by: New York State Legislature
- Enacted: 1982

Amended by
- 2009 Loft Law Amendment; 2013 Loft Law Amendment
- Status: In force

Article 7-C of the New York Multiple Dwelling Law, commonly known as the Loft Law, was enacted to protect the residential tenants of certain former commercial or manufacturing buildings in New York City from substandard conditions, eviction, and unfair rent increases. The law became necessary as a response to advocacy on behalf of loft tenants, who were chiefly artists who built out their spaces in the buildings after the manufacturing industry left New York City. The law affected buildings it defined as Interim Multiple Dwellings (IMDs), former commercial or manufacturing loft buildings that had at least three units occupied by residents during the period of April 1, 1980, through December 1, 1981. It required landlords to bring converted residences up to code, and prevented them from charging tenants for improvements until the issuance of a Certificate of Occupancy. The law is administered by the New York City Loft Board.

The Loft Law has been subsequently amended several times to expand the eligibility requirements for qualifying loft units.

== See also ==
- Rent control in New York
- 2009 Loft Law Amendment
