= JonsBones =

American medical ostelogy bone kits startup company

JonsBones, Inc.
- Type: Privately held
- Industry: Retail
- Founded: November 26, 2018
- Headquarters: Brooklyn, New York, US
- Area served: United States
- Key people: Jon Pichaya Ferry (Founder/President)
- Products: Medical osteology
- Website: www.jonsbones.com

JonsBones is an American startup company best known for selling medical osteology bone kits. The company mainly sells its bone collection to universities, hospitals, chiropractors, medical students, and artists.

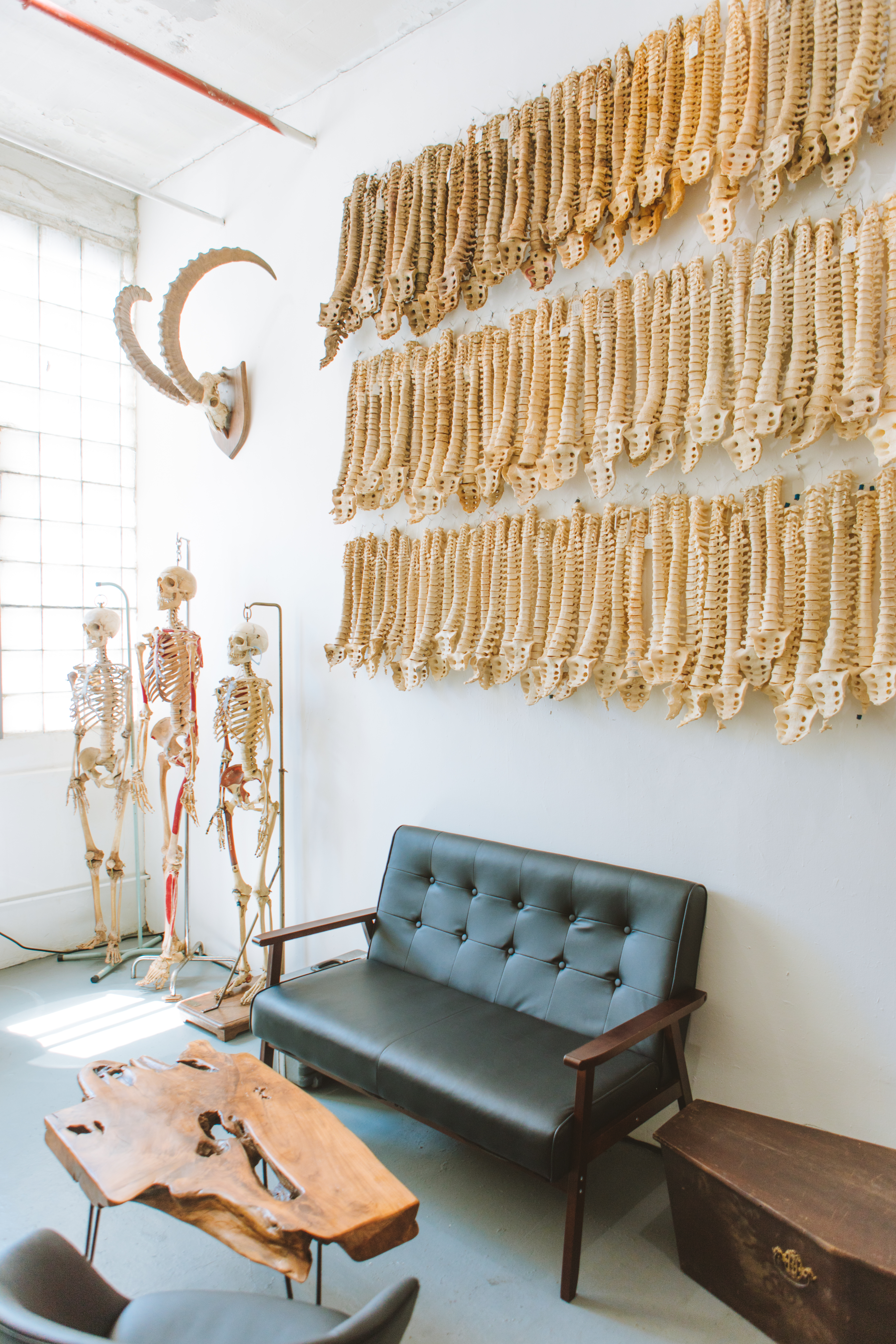
Jonsbones Showroom, Bushwick, Brooklyn

== Background ==
JonsBones was founded by Jon Pichaya Ferry on November 26, 2018 while he was pursuing a degree in product design at Parsons School of Design. The business sells all bones found in the human body, including spines, skulls and full skeletons.

Ferry has maintained that his company is a supplier for those in the field of osteology (the study of human bones), primarily medical students. The company also attracts non-medical clientele, including anthropologists, collectors, and artists. Ferry also claims law enforcement agencies use individual bones to train cadaver dogs. When asked about the business' customers, Ferry stated that he believes “everybody has the right to study bones."

== Controversy ==
JonsBones was criticized after Ferry talked about his bone trade on video sharing platform TikTok, with questions arising about the legality, morality and ethics of trading human bones. Critics raised concerns for the ethical treatment of human remains in Ferry's collection, referencing clients who buy bones not for educational purposes but as materials for jewelry, chandeliers and other curiosities. Ferry countered that in the United States, there is no law that prohibits the "sale and possession of human osteology." Ferry has refused to divulge identifying information about his buyers, citing privacy reasons, and has stated that he has no control over what his clients do with the bones after purchase.

== Museum ==
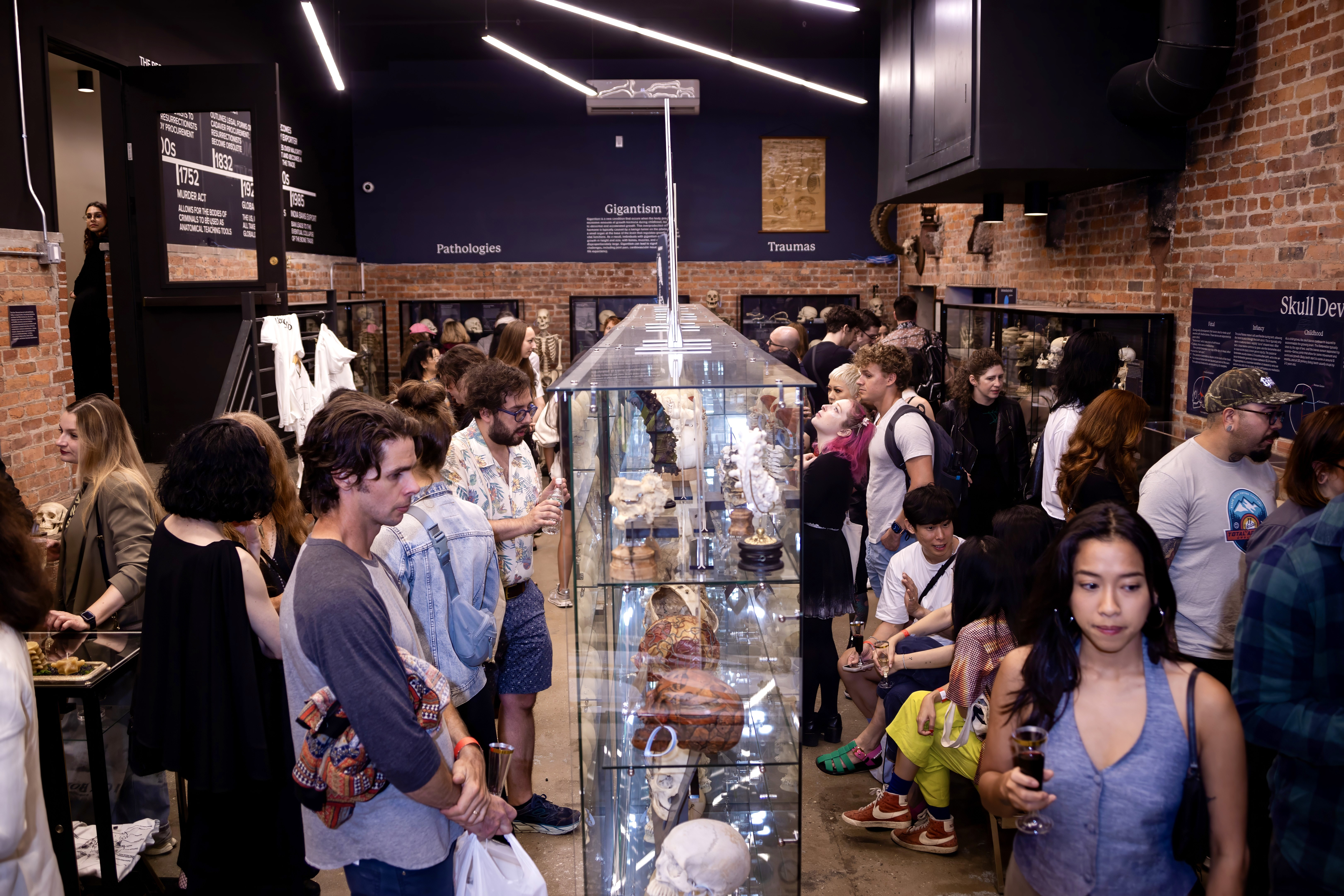
The Bone Museum Grand Opening

On October 30, 2023, the Bone Museum was inaugurated, as an institution with a focus on the history of the medical bone trade and human osteology. It is located at 255 McKibbin Street in New York City.
