= S. M. McKibben House =

Historic house in Iowa, United States

- U.S. National Register of Historic Places
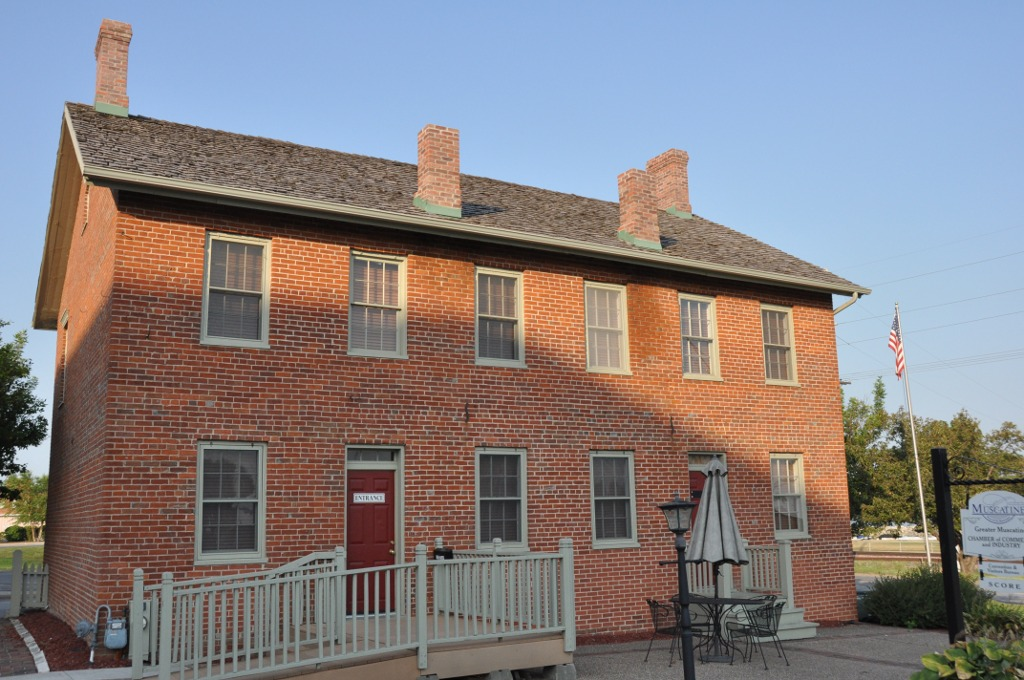
- The rear elevation of the house in 2012

- Location within Iowa Location within the United States
- Location: Walnut St. between Front and 2nd, Muscatine, Iowa
- Coordinates: 41°25′21″N 91°02′32″W
- Area: less than one acre
- Built: 1866-1869
- Built by: Samuel N. McKibben
- Architectural style: Federal
- NRHP reference No.: 74000800
- Added to NRHP: August 27, 1974

S. M. McKibben House is an historic residence, now office building, located in Muscatine, Iowa, United States. It has been listed on the National Register of Historic Places since 1974.

== History ==
Samuel N. McKibben was a native of Pennsylvania who moved to Iowa sometime before 1856. Successful in business he had this double house built for his family between 1866 and 1869. Over his years in Muscatine, he was a lumber merchant, saloon operator, cultivator manufacturing and merchandising groceries, provisions, and the like. The house is one of the few early structures that remain in the oldest residential section of town. It has been re-purposed to house a local Insurance Agency.

== Architecture ==
The Federal style house is a two-story structure that measures approximately 40 by 25 feet (12.2 by 7.6 m). The exterior of the double house is composed of red brick laid in common bond with headers every eighth course. The main facade features a symmetrical arrangement of openings. A major renovation of the house was undertaken in 1964. The original porches, front doors, and windows were removed.
