= Roof window =

Window incorporated into a roof

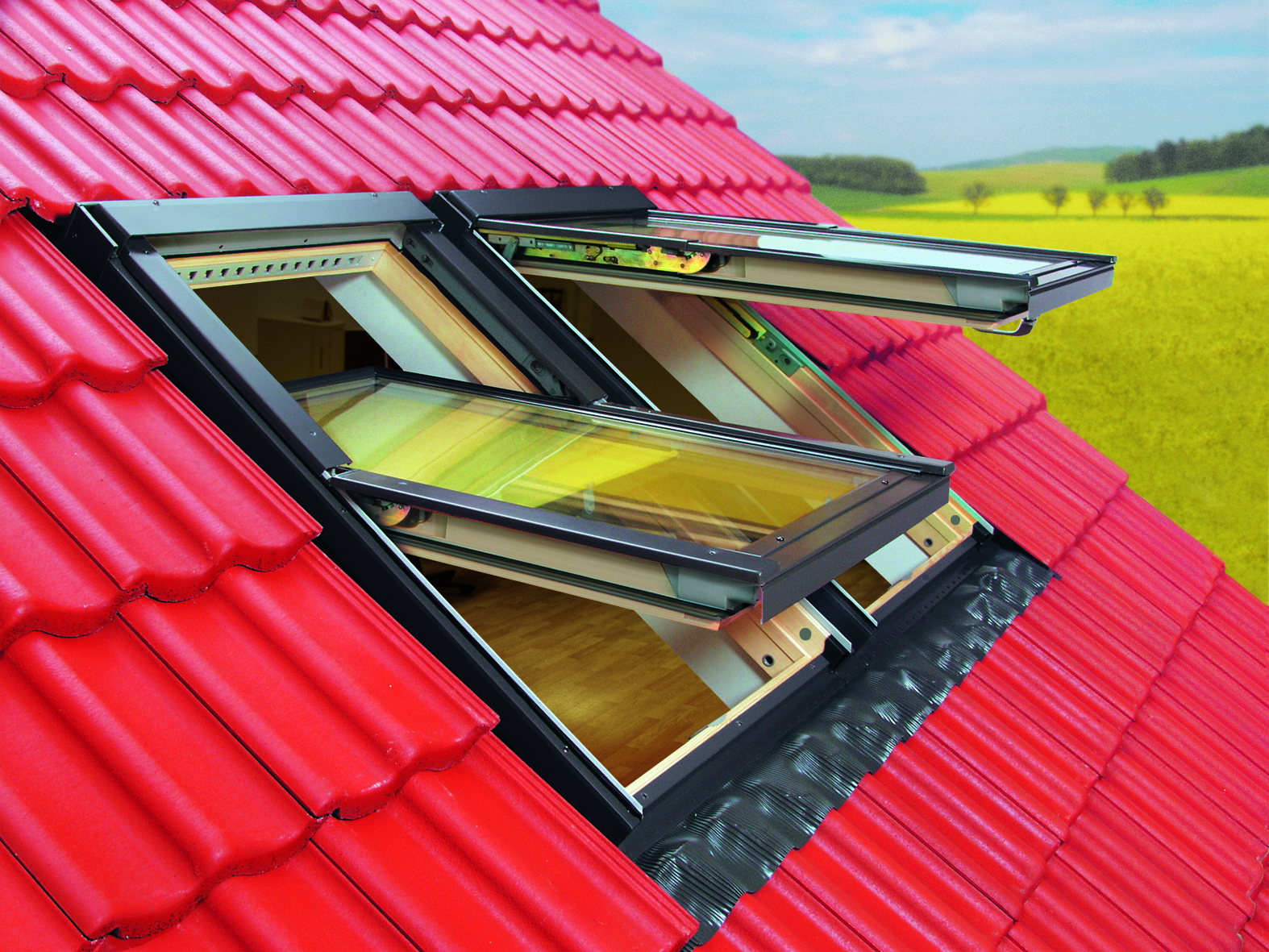
Opened windows

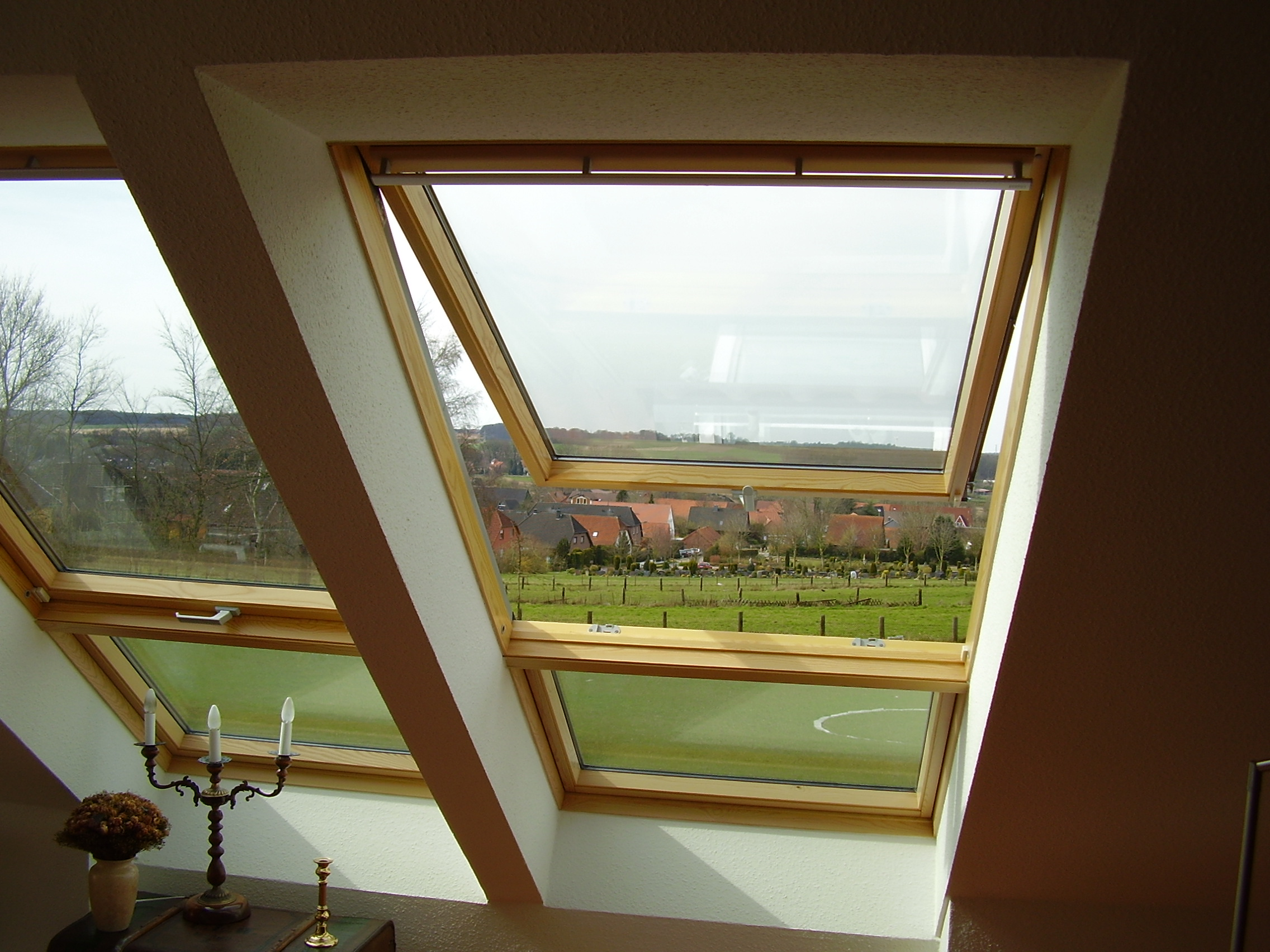
Interior view of roof windows

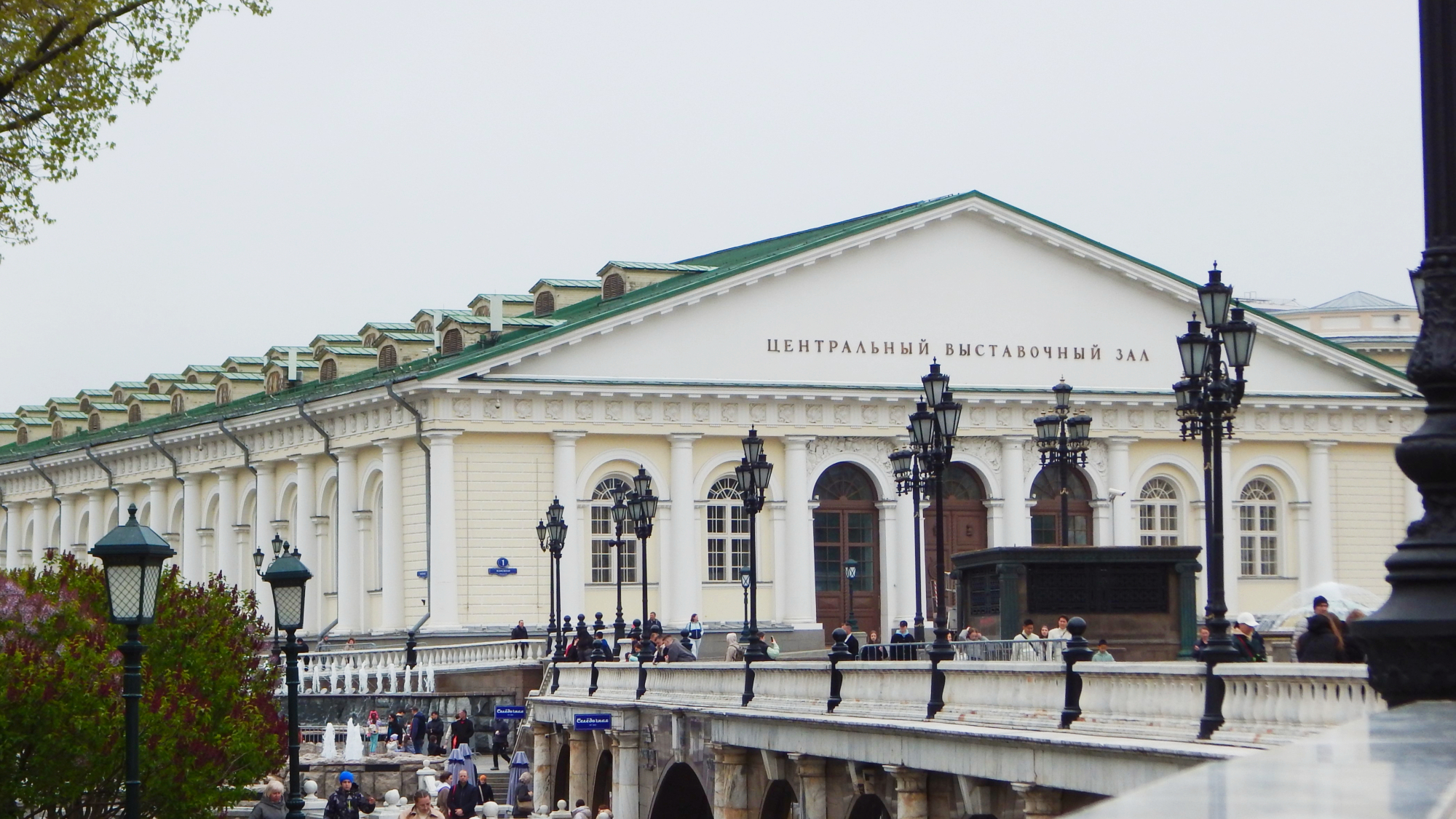
Roof windows on the Manezh exposition hall. Moscow, Russia, May 2025.

A roof window or garret window is an outward opening window that is incorporated as part of the design of a roof. Often confused with a skylight, a roof window differs in a few basic ways. A roof window is often a good option when there is a desire to allow both light and fresh air into the space.

A roof window is different from a tubular skylight in that the light is not directed through any type of channel or tube in order to provide lighting for the interior of a building. This type of light tube design is often employed with buildings where the installation of a skylight or roof window is not practical.

While a roof window is normally included in the original construction of the building, it is possible to add the design feature to an existing structure. As long as the framework and the slope of the roof allow for the inclusion of this type of window, it can be installed with relative ease. Many manufacturers offer prefabricated window inserts for retrofitting into existing roofs.

== See also ==
- VELUX
- Dormer
- Loft conversions in the United Kingdom
- Flashing (weatherproofing)
