= New York City Loft Board =

New York City government agency

Loft Board
Department overview
- Formed: 1982
- Jurisdiction: New York City
- Employees: 12
- Department executive: Rick Chandler, Board Chairperson
- Key document: 1982 Loft Law
- Website: www.nyc.gov/html/loft/html/home/home.shtml

The New York City Loft Board (Loft Board) is a quasi-legislative and judicial body of the New York City government that oversees the legal conversion of commercial and manufacturing spaces to residential use.

== History ==
In the 1970s New York City landlords were allowing tenants to move into buildings that were zoned for commercial and manufacturing use in neighborhoods such as Tribeca, SoHo, and Chelsea. The loft conversions were more profitable to the landlords than industrial use. By 1977, the New York City Department of City Planning found that 91.5 percent of the conversions were illegal and 44.9 percent of those lofts were occupied by heads of households who were artists. As these neighborhoods became more popular landlords attempted to substantially raise rents. Tenants fought these rent increases in court with the defenses that the apartments were de facto multiple dwellings if there were three or more units and rent stabilized if there were six or more units. These defenses limited the reasons they could be evicted and absolved them from paying rent because the spaces lacked a certificate of occupancy that was required for residential use. City officials were concerned as landlords could not evict or collect rent from the tenants and that a growing number of tenants were living in spaces that were considered dangerous. This conundrum lead one legal scholar to doubt that "statutory or case law [could] channel such challenges to zoning and housing laws into legal uses."

=== 1982 Loft Law ===
In 1982, the New York State Legislature passed the 1982 Loft Law that established a legal framework to legally convert lofts, called interim multiple dwellings or IMDs, to residential apartments that would be subject to rent stabilization. The law established the Loft Board with enforcing the statute's provisions and deadlines and adjudicating disputes between landlords and tenants. The goal of the Loft Board was to limit illegal conversion and provide a balance between the rights of landlords and tenants. The Loft Board consists of a nine-person board with members appointed by the mayor. The members include one person representing loft tenants, one representing loft owners, one representing manufacturing interests, and the rest serve as public members. The Loft Board delegates to administrative law judges from the New York City Office of Administrative Trials and Hearings (OATH) to hear disputes and write recommendation. The Loft Board during its monthly meetings will vote to accept or reject the proposed order or remand back to OATH. Former Chairman Carl Weisbrod described the work as "It's like going into a war zone. The only thing the tenants and owners can agree upon is how much they hate the Loft Board."

=== 2009 Loft Law Amendments ===
In 2009 the Loft Board was merged into New York City Department of Buildings. That same year the scope of the law increased with the 2009 Loft Law Amendment that expanded the loft law's coverage to neighborhoods outside of Manhattan such as Williamsburg, Bushwick, and Long Island City. Mayor Michael Bloomberg negotiated amendments that would exclude certain neighborhoods and end the law with sunset provisions. The Loft Law was amended again in 2013 with revisions to the period of time for new lofts to apply for legalization, the process of legalization, and rules regarding buildings alleged to contain a use that is incompatible with residential use. Loft tenants are advocating for additional changes primarily around removing the 2010 Bloomberg amendments and that the Department of Buildings has been passive in protecting tenants.

== Board Chairperson ==
Name	Dates in Office	Mayoral Administration	Notes and References
Carl Weisbrod	1982-1984	Ed Koch	
Jorge L. Batista	1984-1986	Ed Koch	
George M.C. Dole	1986-1989	Ed Koch	
David Klasfeld	1989 – 1997	Ed Koch	
Hector Batista	1997 – 1999	Rudy Giuliani	
Kimberly D. Hardy	2000 – 2003	Michael R. Bloomberg	
Marc Rauch	2003 – 2008	Michael R. Bloomberg	
Robert D. Limandri	2009 – 2013	Michael R. Bloomberg	
Rick D. Chandler	2014 – Present	Bill De Blasio	
