= Industrial Complex at 221 McKibbin Street =

- U.S. National Register of Historic Places
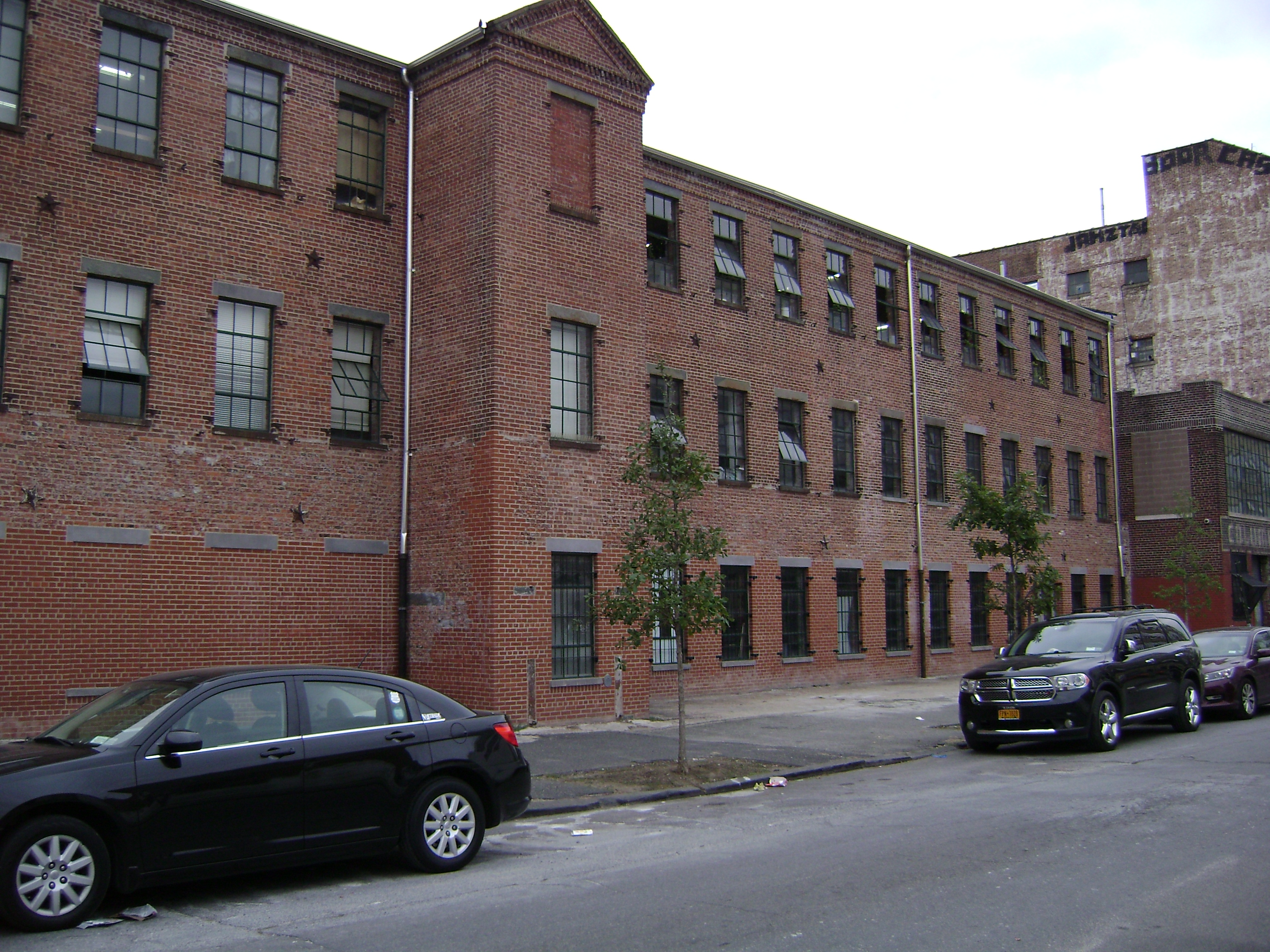

- Location within New York City
- Location: 221 McKibbin Street, Brooklyn, New York, United States
- Coordinates: 40°42′19.5″N 73°56′19.09″W
- Area: less than one acre
- Built: 1845 (181 years ago)
- NRHP reference No.: 09000303
- Added to NRHP: May 12, 2009 (17 years ago)

The Industrial Complex at 221 McKibbin Street is an industrial complex in the East Williamsburg neighborhood of Brooklyn in New York City, New York, U.S.

== Description and history ==
The complex consists of ten interconnected structures built between about 1845 and 1951. The most prominent building is the three-story brick spinning house of the H. Lawrence & Sons Rope Works, built before 1870. In addition to rope manufacturers, the complex had cardboard manufacturers, glass making, knitting, silk weaving, and wood working.

It was listed on the National Register of Historic Places in 2009.

The Industrial Complex at 221 McKibbin Street is located on McKibbin Street, sharing the block with a range of buildings including PS 147, Sure We Can, and the McKibbin Street Lofts.

== See also ==
- National Register of Historic Places listings in Kings County, New York
