= Loft =

Near-roof part of a building

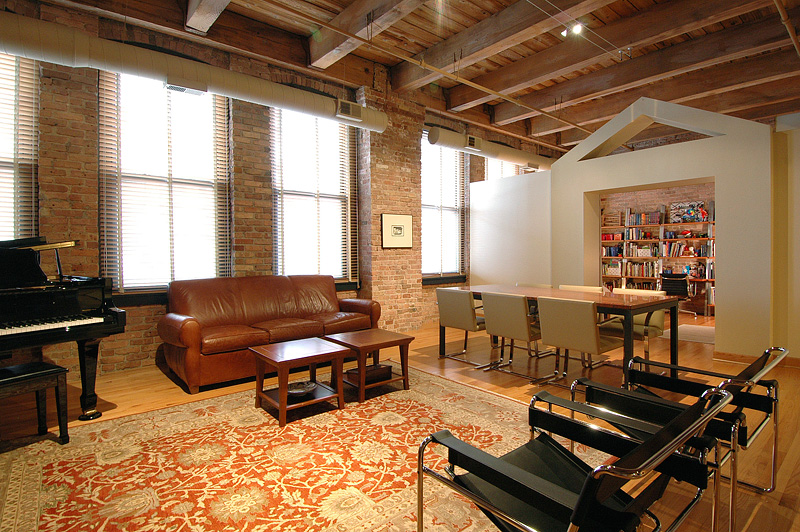
A former warehouse for printing presses converted to a loft apartment on Chicago's Near West Side

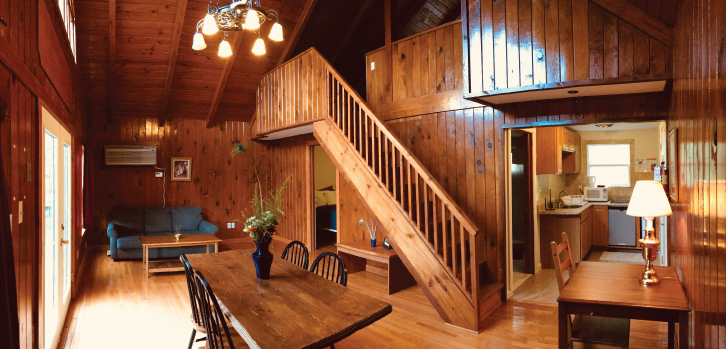
A US-style loft; the additional story covers only a few rooms, leaving one or more sides open to the lower floor

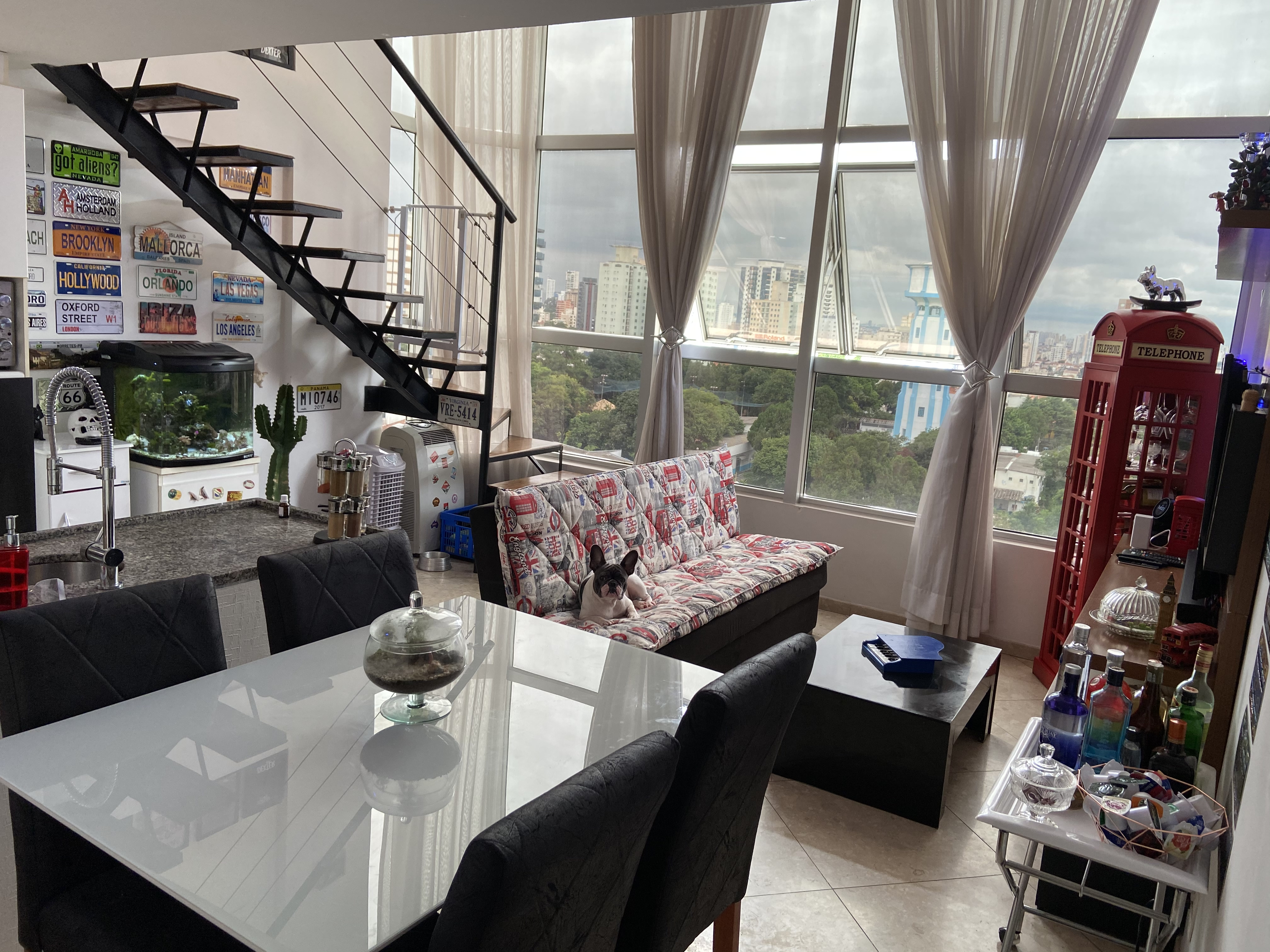
Alto de Santana, São Paulo, Brazil.

A loft is a building's upper storey or elevated area in a room directly under the roof (American usage), or just an attic: a storage space under the roof usually accessed by a ladder (primarily British usage). A loft apartment refers to large adaptable open space, often converted for residential use (a converted loft) from some other use, often light industrial.

== Loft and attic ==
In American usage, a loft is an upper room or storey in a building, directly under the roof, used for storage (as in most private houses). In this sense it is roughly synonymous with attic, the major difference being that an attic typically constitutes an entire floor of the building, while a loft covers only a few rooms, leaving one or more sides open to the lower floor.

In British usage, lofts are usually just a roof space accessed via a hatch and loft ladder, while attics tend to be rooms immediately under the roof accessed via a staircase. Lofts may have a specific purpose, e.g. an organ loft in a church, or to sleep in (sleeping loft). In barns a hayloft is often larger than the ground floor, since it would store a year's worth of hay.

An attic or loft can often be converted to form a functional living accommodation (see Loft conversions in the United Kingdom).

In modern Norwegian and in English, "loft" is used for the upper room or the space just under the roof in larger buildings. The word originates from Old Norse lopt, loft which also could mean air or being elevated (as in the related word løfte, English "to lift"). In older Scandinavian usage, loft referred to a two-storey unheated building used for storage and bedroom, in contrast to dwelling buildings that were one-storey with a fireplace.

== Loft apartment ==
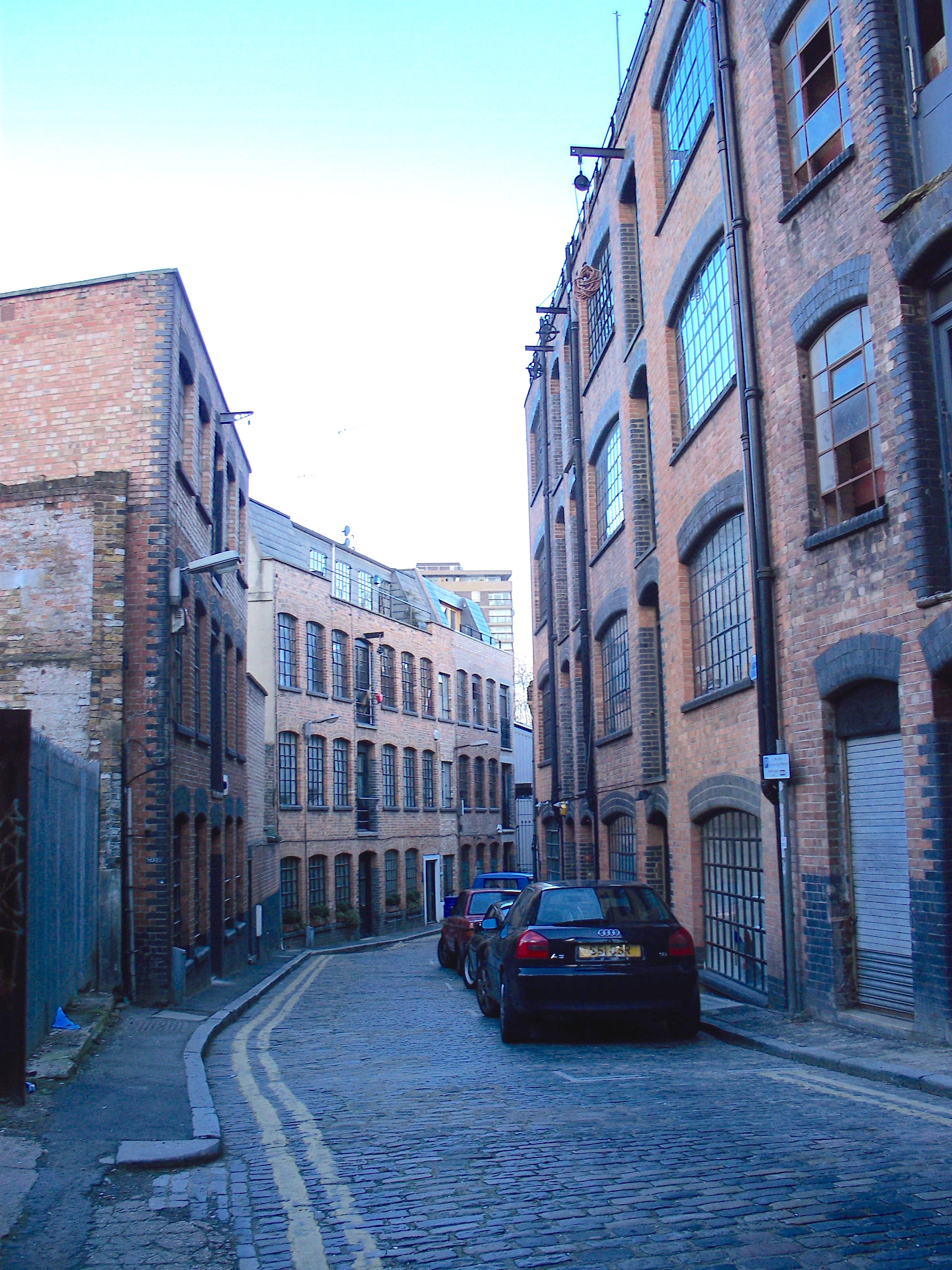
Warehouses converted into loft apartments in Hoxton, London, England

Loft apartments are apartments that are generally built from former industrial buildings. When industrial developments are developed into condominiums instead of apartments, they may be called loft condominiums. The general term warehouse-to-loft conversions may sometimes be used for development of industrial buildings into apartments and condominiums. "Loft-style" may also refer simply to developments where a street-level business occupies the first floor while apartment "lofts" are placed above the first floor.

Sometimes, loft apartments are one component of municipal urban renewal initiatives that also include renovation of industrial buildings into art galleries and studio space as well as promotion of a new part of the city as an "arts district".

Originally popular with artists, they are now highly sought after by other bohemians and hipsters, and the gentrification of the former manufacturing sectors of medium to large cities is now a familiar pattern. One such sector is Manhattan's Meatpacking District. The adoption of the Adaptive Reuse Ordinance (2001) in the City of Los Angeles (primarily the Arts District) is another example of such legislation to encourage the conversion of no longer economically viable industrial and commercial buildings to residential loft communities.

Such is the demand for these spaces that real estate developers have taken to creating ready-made "lofts" in urban areas that are gentrifying or that seem primed to do so. While some of these units are created by developers during the renovation of old buildings, a number of them are included in the floor plans of brand new developments. Both types of pre-fab loft offer buyers or renters proximity to urban amenities afforded by traditional lofts, but without perceived safety risks of living in economically depressed formerly industrial areas.

=== Industrial/hard loft ===
Real estate industry distinguishes between two kinds of lofts. "Hard lofts" are former industrial buildings converted to residential or live/work use. Many of these conversions retain open ceilings with exposed beams, electrical wiring, and HVAC ducts, instead of covering them with modern suspended ceilings or sheetrock ceilings.

=== Soft loft ===
"Soft lofts" are loft-style residential buildings built entirely anew. They are open-concept spaces with high ceilings, large windows, brickwork, and cement ceilings. Soft lofts can look more residential and have modern finishes, but lack the character and history of hard lofts.

== Other lofts ==
=== Commercial loft ===
A commercial loft refers to upper storey space, usually in a commercial or industrial building with higher ceilings; a second storey area for storage or offices above may be added within the original space used by a previous business occupant, effectively becoming a mezzanine area within the commercial loft space. Such adaptation of loft space, can result in better operating efficiencies for ongoing light industrial, commercial and work/live use.

=== Live/work loft ===
A Live/work loft is a residential unit located in a commercially zoned building that has either been issued a certificate of residential occupancy or meets specific criteria making it eligible for the protection of loft laws, which vary state by state.

For example, in New York State a live/work loft must meet the following criteria:

1. The building was formerly used for manufacturing or commercial purposes;
2. The building has at least three units that were occupied residentially for 12 consecutive months during the window period from January 1, 2008 – December 31, 2009
3. The unit occupies at least 400 square feet (37 m^{2}) with at least one window and can be accessed directly from a common area such as a hallway or the street; and
4. The unit has a certificate of occupancy (CO) or an application for Loft Law protection has been filed on or before March 14, 2014.

Loft Law was designed to protect artists and other entrepreneurs that are remote workers. To qualify for the Loft Law protection, the unit must be primarily residential with the commercial purpose being clearly incidental to the residential use; utilising no more than 49% of the total space; with no more than 3 employees; and be carried on by the actual occupant of the unit.

Historically, loft residents consisted of artists and other artisans taking advantage of cheap rents, large spaces and load-bearing floors. Loft residences were illegal and loft dwellers resided under commercial leases, forgoing basic residential rights such as domestic hot water and sanitation. To relieve their uncertain status, many state legislatures enacted loft laws.

=== Mould loft ===
A long building at a shipyard with a considerable floor area on which the lines produced by a naval architect can be laid off in their full dimensions. After that the full-size drawings can be copied with the aid of wooden moulds to which, in turn, the steel frames or, in the case of wooden vessels, the hull moulds, are fashioned (see lofting).

=== Rigging loft ===
An elevated area or gallery in a shipyard where workers stand while fitting rigging.

=== Parachute loft ===
A large, open, high ceilinged space where parachute riggers re-pack parachutes into parachute containers.

=== Sail loft ===
A large open space used by sailmakers to make sails. The floor has to be big enough to lay out the sail as the canvas is marked and cut ready for sewing.

=== Church architecture ===
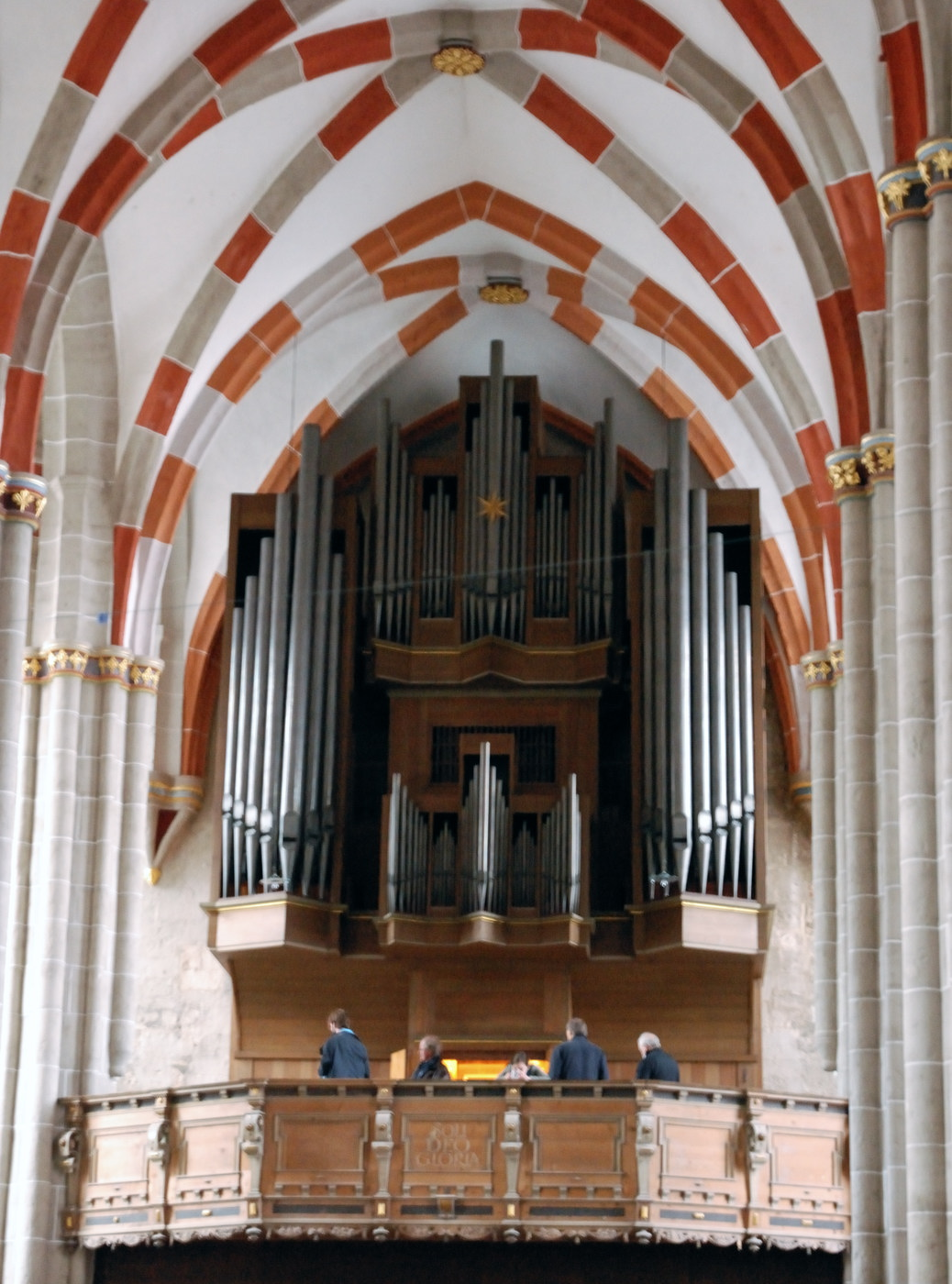
An organ loft in Germany

Some churches have a choir loft, where the singers stand or sit during services. Sometimes the church organ is located in an organ loft, which may or may not have space for musicians apart from the organist. Churches may also contain triforiums with projecting watching-lofts.

=== Loft conversions ===
It is fairly common to convert all or part of a home into a loft to create an extra room in order to prevent needing to move to a new house. The most common additions are an extra bedroom or study. The attic area of a building tends to be unused, but when converted can add a large amount of floor space.

=== Pigeon loft ===
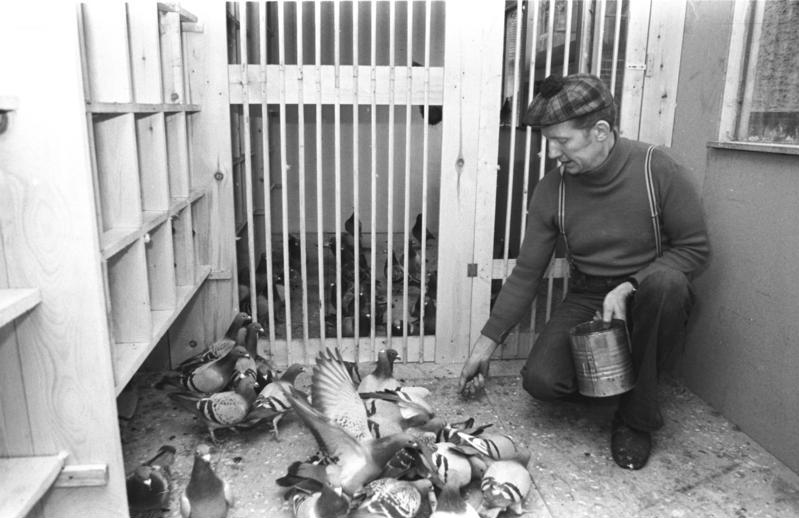
Pigeon loft

Housing for domestic pigeons is often called a pigeon loft. Pigeon lofts consist of a large cage or aviary and sometimes a nest box. They were a traditional amenity, now usually abandoned or repurposed, in the palaces of nobility and commercial buildings that predate telegraphy.

== See also ==
- Fly system
- Loft bed
- Mezzanine
- Warehouse district
