= Ardon, Iowa =

- Unincorporated community
- Location within Iowa Location within the United States
- Coordinates: 41°23′42″N 91°11′19″W
- Country: United States
- State: Iowa
- County: Muscatine County
- Elevation: 748 ft (228 m)
- Time zone: UTC-6 (Central (CST))
  - Summer (DST): UTC-5 (CDT)
- GNIS feature ID: 464446

Ardon is a former townsite and unincorporated community in Muscatine County, Iowa, United States.

== Geography ==
Ardon is located four miles east of Cranston. It is located near the junction of Jasper Avenue and 235th Street in Seventy-Six Township.

== History ==
Ardon was a rail town built in the late 1800s. Once home to livery stables, a hotel, a railroad depot, and around 70 residents, the rail line was later moved. The railroad station was moved two miles west. Only the Ardon rail sign, St. Malachy's Catholic Church and graveyard, and a few scattered houses remain. St. Malachy's Church was constructed in 1902 next to the railroad and desanctified in 1991. The graveyard lies a half mile south of the church.

Ardon's population was 42 in 1925. The population was 25 in 1940.

== See also ==
- Midway Beach, Iowa
