= Lock and Dam No. 16 =

Dam in Illinois and Iowa, U.S.

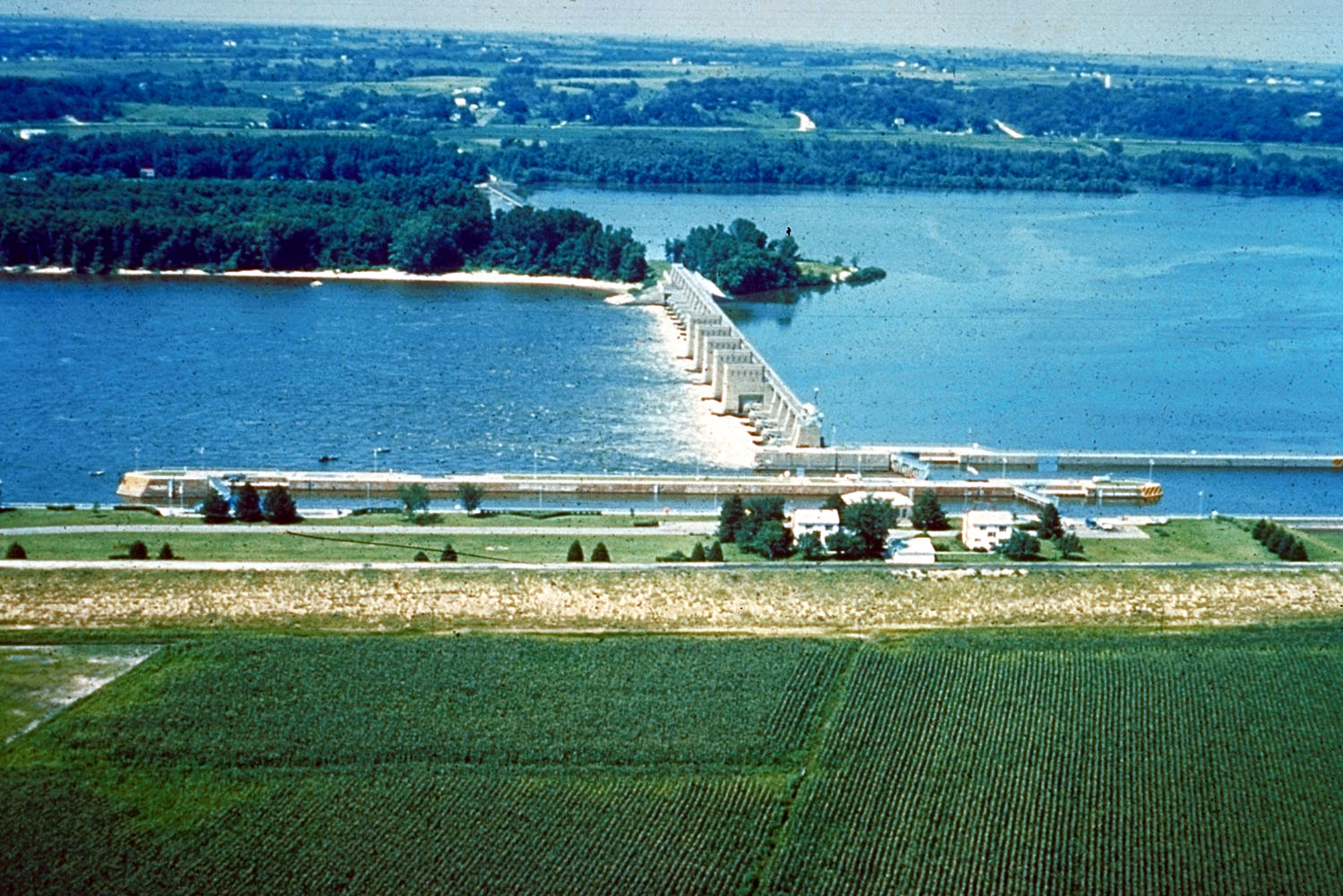
- Mississippi River Lock and Dam number 16
- Interactive map of Lock and Dam No. 16
- Location: Sweetland Township, Muscatine County, Iowa / Drury Township, Rock Island County, Illinois, near Muscatine, Iowa, USA
- Coordinates: 41°25′37.29″N 91°0′37.75″W
- Construction began: 1933
- Opening date: July 10, 1937
- Operators: U.S. Army Corps of Engineers, Rock Island District

Dam and spillways
- Impounds: Upper Mississippi River
- Length: 1,315 feet (400.8 m)

Reservoir
- Creates: Pool 16
- Total capacity: 88,400 acre⋅ft (0.1090 km^{3})
- Catchment area: 99,400 mi^{2} (257,000 km^{2})
- Lock and Dam No. 16 Historic District
- U.S. National Register of Historic Places
- U.S. Historic district
- Location within Iowa Location within the United States
- Location: 33109 102nd Ave. W, Muscatine, Iowa
- Area: 102.4 acres (41.4 ha)
- Built: 1937
- Architect: U.S. Army Corps of Engineers
- MPS: Upper Mississippi River 9-Foot Navigation Project MPS
- NRHP reference No.: 04000176
- Added to NRHP: March 10, 2004

Lock and Dam No. 16 is a lock and dam located near Muscatine, Iowa on the Upper Mississippi River around river mile 457.2. The movable portion of the dam is 1,315 feet (400.8 m) long and consists of 4 roller gates and 15 Tainter gates. The lock is 110 feet (33.5 m) wide by 600 feet (182.9 m) long with a maximum lift of 9 feet (2.7m) In 2004, the facility was listed in the National Register of Historic Places as Lock and Dam No. 16 Historic District, #04000176 covering 1,024 acres (4.1 km^{2}), 1 building, 5 structures, and 2 objects.

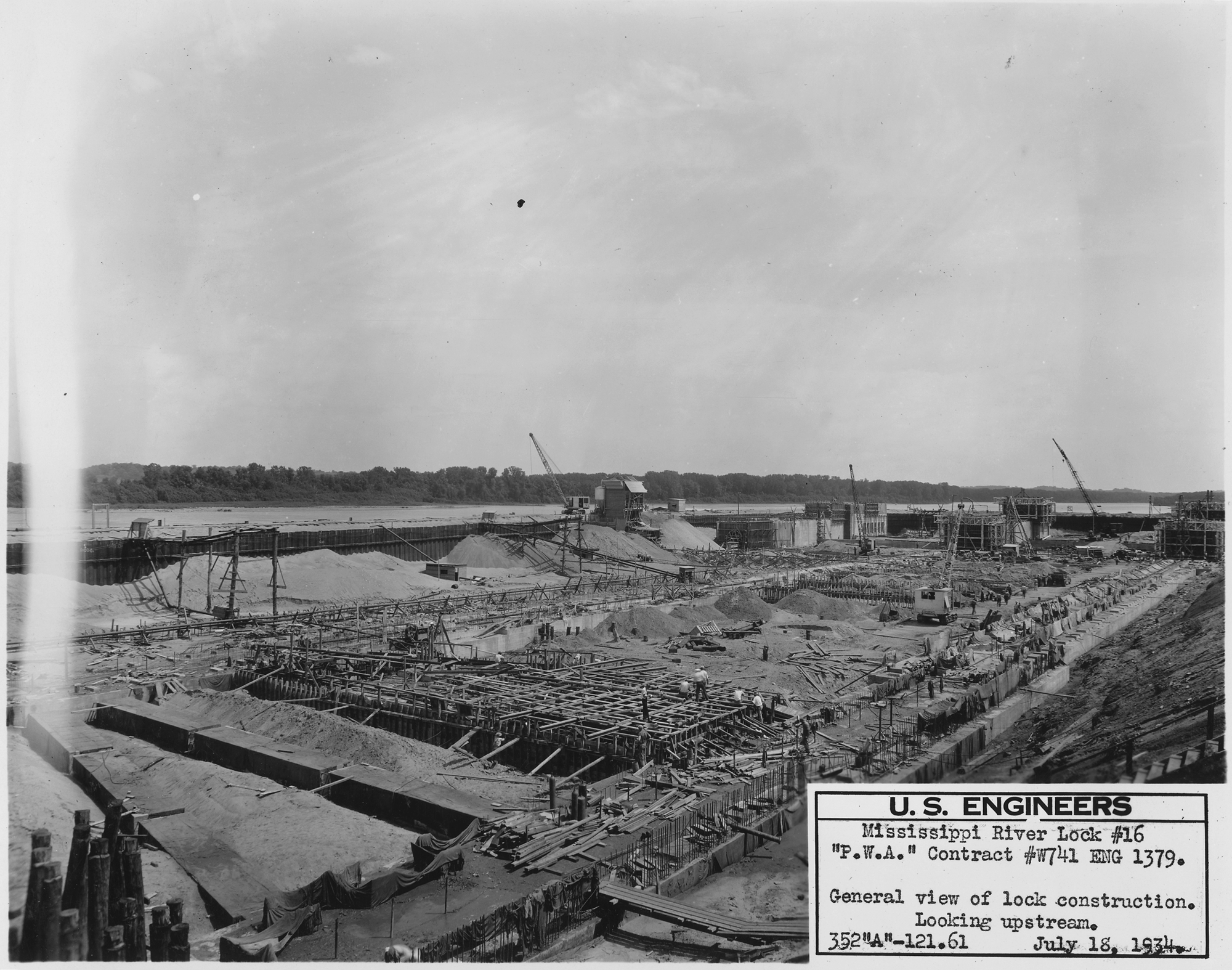
Public Works Administration Project and Army Corps of Engineers Lock and Dam #16 construction.

== See also ==
- Public Works Administration dams list
