= Port Allen =

Port Allen is a place name that could refer to:

- Port Allen Airport
- Port Allen, Hawaii
- Port Allen, Iowa
- Port Allen, Louisiana
