= Wilton Township =

Wilton Township may refer to the following townships in the United States:

- Wilton Township, Will County, Illinois
- Wilton Township, Iowa
- Wilton Township, Waseca County, Minnesota
