= Forrest Burmeister =

American football player (1913–1997)

Profile
- Position: Guard/Tackle

Personal information
- Born: August 18, 1913; Stockton, Iowa, U.S.
- Died: December 5, 1997 (aged 84); Wilton, Iowa, U.S.
- Listed height: 6 ft 3 in (1.91 m)
- Listed weight: 215 lb (98 kg)

Career information
- College: Purdue

Career history
- Cleveland Rams (1937–1938)
- Stats at Pro Football Reference

Forrest Barth Burmeister (August 18, 1913 – December 5, 1997) was an American football player who spent two years in the National Football League (NFL).

Burmeister was born in Stockton, Iowa, the son of Edward Paul Burmeister and Phylora Bohnsock Burmeister. He played football at Davenport High School and Purdue University. He worked at iron foundries as a young man. He was a member of the Cleveland Rams in the 1937 and 1938 seasons.

Burmeister married teacher Arloine Arp in 1940. They had four sons. He died in 1997, at the age of 84, at a care center in Wilton, Iowa. His son Leon F. Burmeister was a professor of biostatistics at the University of Iowa. One of Burmeister's grandsons is sportscaster Paul Burmeister.
