= Fruitland Township =

Fruitland Township may refer to:

- Fruitland Township, Iowa
- Fruitland Township, Michigan
