= Kent Estates, Iowa =

- Census-designated place
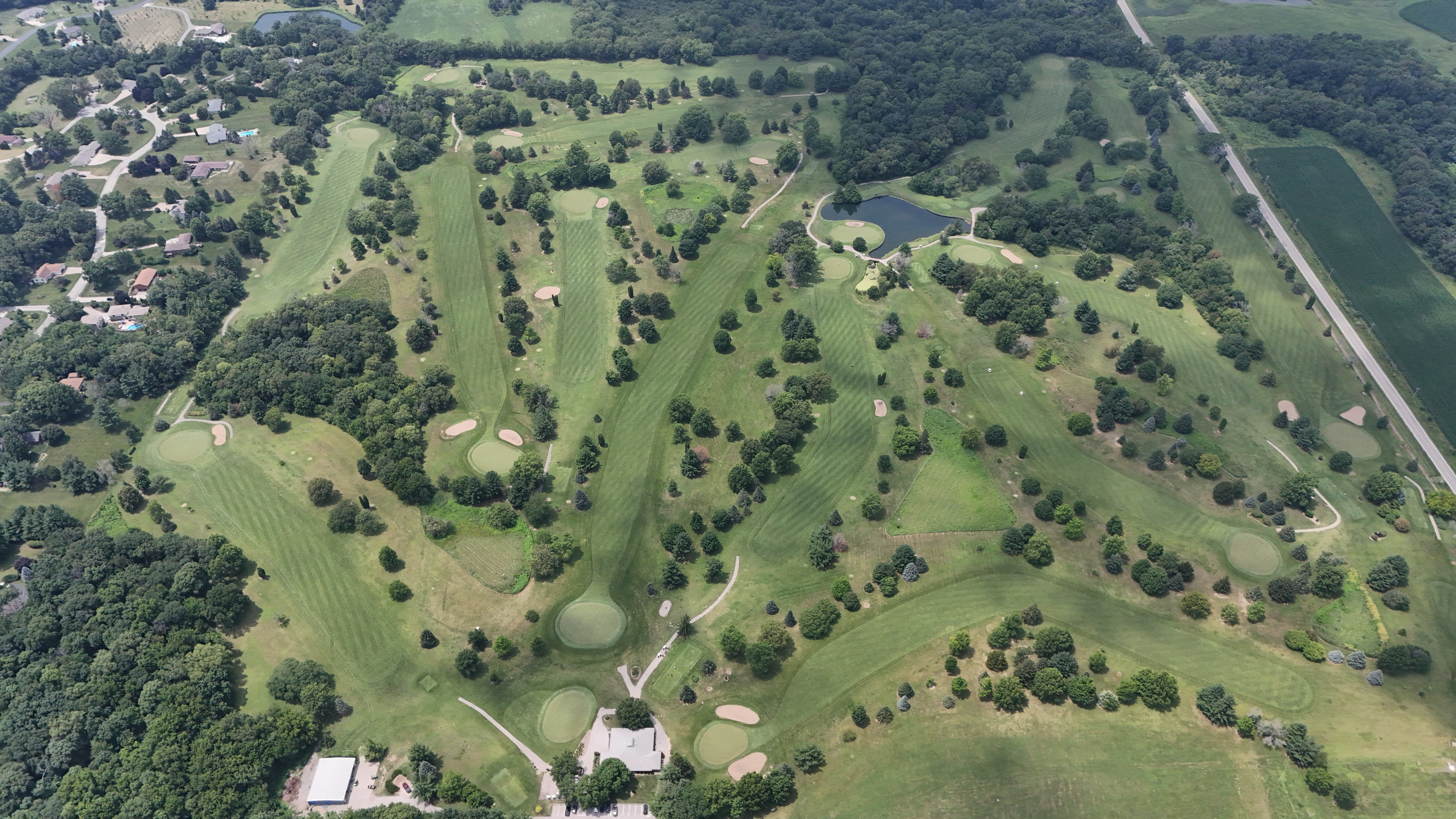
- Muscatine Municipal Golf Course, adjacent to Kent Estates

- Location within Iowa Location within the United States
- Coordinates: 41°27′59″N 91°03′25″W
- Country: United States
- State: Iowa
- County: Muscatine
- Township: Bloomington

Area
  - Total: 4.55 sq mi (11.78 km^{2})
  - Land: 4.55 sq mi (11.78 km^{2})
  - Water: 0 sq mi (0.00 km^{2})
- Elevation: 673 ft (205 m)

Population (2020)
  - Total: 2,074
  - Density: 456.1/sq mi (176.12/km^{2})
- Time zone: UTC-6 (Central (CST))
  - Summer (DST): UTC-5 (CDT)
- ZIP Code: 52761 (Muscatine)
- Area code: 563
- FIPS code: 19-40733
- GNIS feature ID: 2806508

Kent Estates is an unincorporated area and census-designated place (CDP) in Muscatine County, Iowa, United States. As of the 2020 census, the population was 2,074.

== Geography ==
It is in the center of the county, along the northern border of Muscatine, the county seat. Iowa Highway 38 runs through the eastern part of the community, leading south 4 miles (6 km) to the center of Muscatine and north 9 miles (14 km) to Wilton. The city of Davenport is 27 miles (43 km) to the east.

== Demographics ==
Historical population
Census	Pop.	Note	%±
2020	2,074		—
U.S. Decennial Census

=== 2020 census ===
As of the 2020 census, Kent Estates had a population of 2,074, with 703 households and 614 families residing in the community. The population density was 455.8 inhabitants per square mile (176.0/km^{2}), and there were 720 housing units at an average density of 158.2 per square mile (61.1/km^{2}).

The median age was 43.0 years. 28.0% of residents were under the age of 18, and 16.7% were 65 years of age or older. 30.5% of residents were under the age of 20; 3.3% were from 20 to 24; 18.5% were from 25 to 44; and 31.0% were from 45 to 64. The gender makeup of the community was 49.8% male and 50.2% female. For every 100 females there were 99.0 males, and for every 100 females age 18 and over there were 100.3 males age 18 and over.

43.9% of residents lived in urban areas, while 56.1% lived in rural areas.

Of the 703 households, 38.7% had children under the age of 18 living with them, 80.5% were married-couple households, 3.8% were cohabitating-couple households, 10.2% had a female householder with no spouse or partner present, and 5.4% had a male householder with no spouse or partner present. About 12.7% of households were non-families, 10.0% were made up of individuals, and 5.3% had someone living alone who was 65 years of age or older.

Of the 720 housing units, 2.4% were vacant. The homeowner vacancy rate was 0.9%, and the rental vacancy rate was 0.0%.

Racial composition as of the 2020 census
Race	Number	Percent
White	1,924	92.8%
Black or African American	16	0.8%
American Indian and Alaska Native	3	0.1%
Asian	29	1.4%
Native Hawaiian and Other Pacific Islander	0	0.0%
Some other race	21	1.0%
Two or more races	81	3.9%
Hispanic or Latino (of any race)	73	3.5%
