= Moscow, Iowa =

- Census-designated place
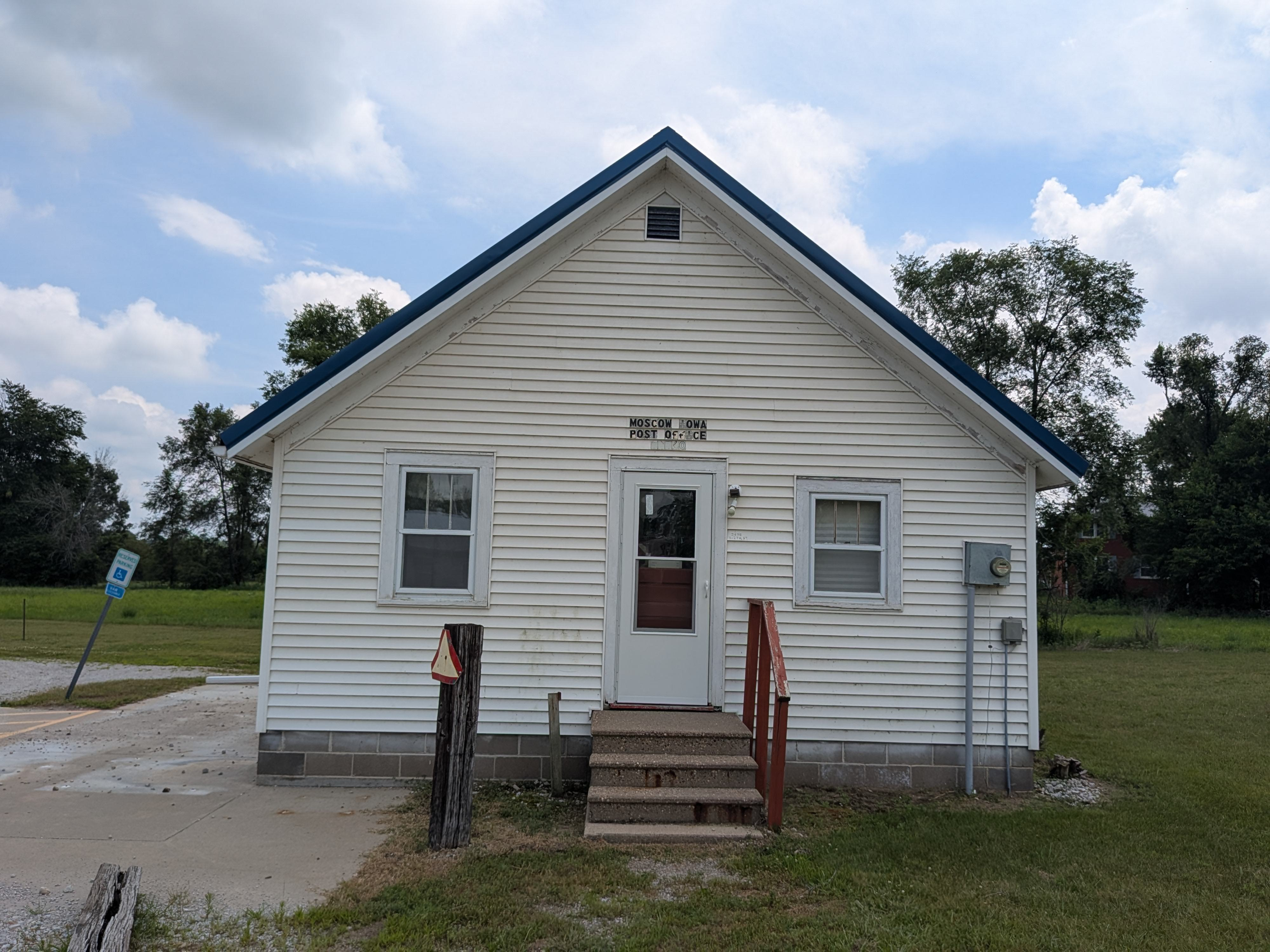
- Moscow Post Office off of 112th Street

- Location within Iowa Location within the United States
- Coordinates: 41°34′21″N 91°04′55″W
- Country: United States
- State: Iowa
- County: Muscatine

Area
  - Total: 1.27 sq mi (3.28 km^{2})
  - Land: 1.19 sq mi (3.08 km^{2})
  - Water: 0.077 sq mi (0.20 km^{2})
- Elevation: 653 ft (199 m)

Population (2020)
  - Total: 290
  - Density: 243.8/sq mi (94.12/km^{2})
- Time zone: UTC-6 (Central (CST))
  - Summer (DST): UTC-5 (CDT)
- ZIP code: 52760
- FIPS code: 19-54345
- GNIS feature ID: 2806529

Moscow is an unincorporated community and census-designated place (CDP) in Muscatine County, Iowa, United States. As of the 2020 census, the population was 290. It has a post office, with the ZIP code of 52760, which opened on May 1, 1837. The community is part of the Muscatine Micropolitan Statistical Area.

== History ==
Moscow was laid out in 1836 by Henry Webster and Dr. Charles Drury. Moscow experienced rapid growth with the arrival of the railroad in 1855.

The population was 153 in 1940.

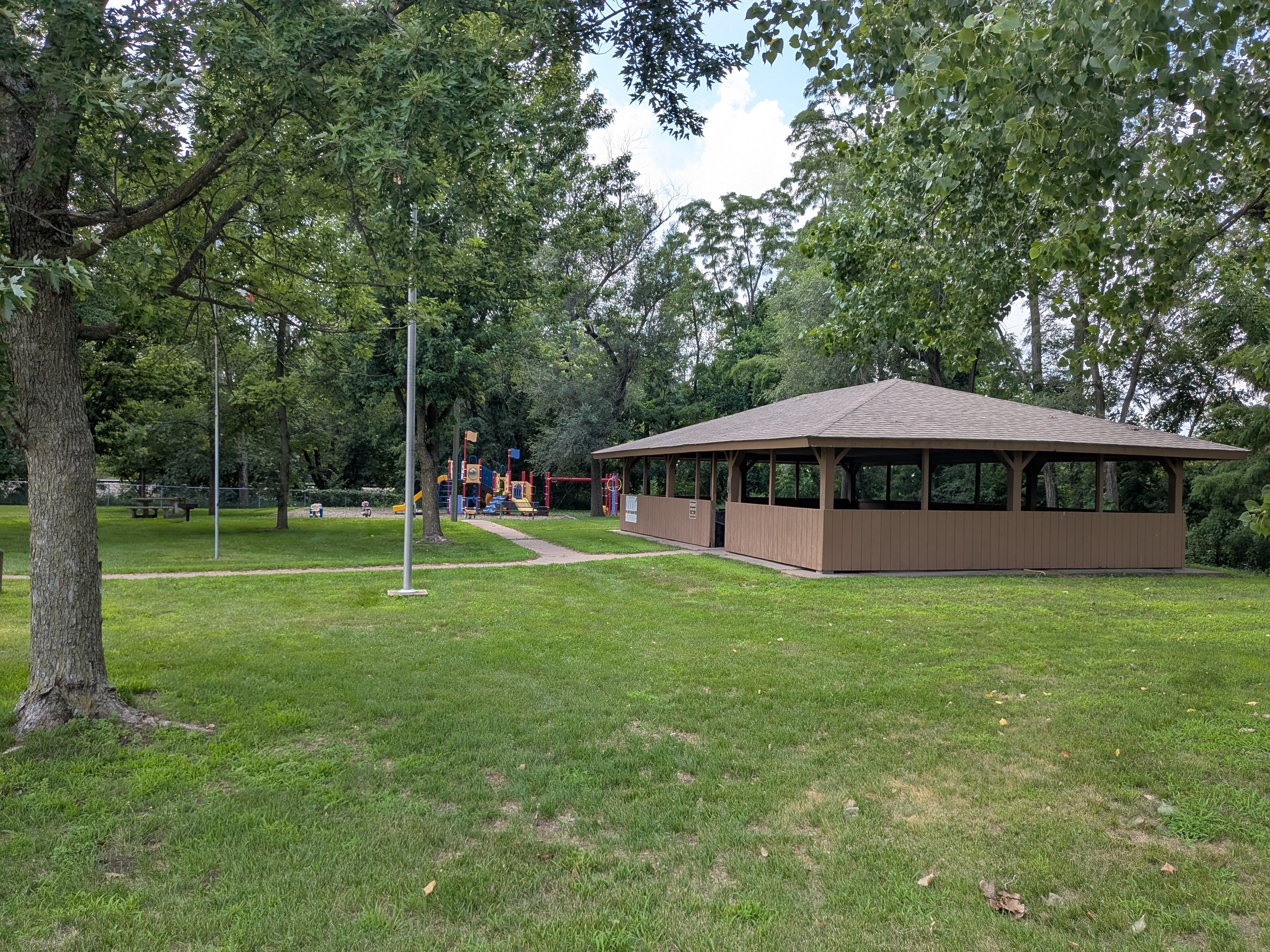
Moscow city park

== Geography ==
Moscow is in northern Muscatine County, along local roads just north of U.S. Route 6, 12 miles (19 km) north of the city of Muscatine, the county seat. Davenport is 29 miles (47 km) to the east, and Iowa City is 26 miles (42 km) to the west-northwest. The Iowa Interstate Railroad operates an estimated one to three trains per day through the town.

Moscow lies on the east side of the Cedar River at an elevation of 653 feet (199 m). According to the U.S. Census Bureau, the CDP has a total area of 1.27 square miles (3.29 km^{2}), of which 1.19 square miles (3.08 km^{2}) are land and 0.08 square miles (0.21 km^{2}), or 5.93%, are water.

Hinkeyville is a small unincorporated community located across the Cedar River from Moscow. It is primarily a residential area; however, Wendling Quarries has their main facility just south of the community.

== Demographics ==
Historical population
Census	Pop.	Note	%±
2020	290		—
U.S. Decennial Census

=== 2020 census ===
As of the census of 2020, there were 290 people, 119 households, and 93 families residing in the community. The population density was 243.8 inhabitants per square mile (94.1/km^{2}). There were 122 housing units at an average density of 102.6 per square mile (39.6/km^{2}). The racial makeup of the community was 96.9% White, 0.7% Black or African American, 0.0% Native American, 0.7% Asian, 0.0% Pacific Islander, 0.0% from other races and 1.7% from two or more races. Hispanic or Latino persons of any race comprised 0.7% of the population.

Of the 119 households, 31.1% of which had children under the age of 18 living with them, 61.3% were married couples living together, 7.6% were cohabitating couples, 15.1% had a female householder with no spouse or partner present and 16.0% had a male householder with no spouse or partner present. 21.8% of all households were non-families. 19.3% of all households were made up of individuals, 10.9% had someone living alone who was 65 years old or older.

The median age in the community was 50.8 years. 22.8% of the residents were under the age of 20; 0.7% were between the ages of 20 and 24; 20.7% were from 25 and 44; 33.1% were from 45 and 64; and 22.8% were 65 years of age or older. The gender makeup of the community was 63.1% male and 36.9% female.
