= Conesville, Iowa =

- City
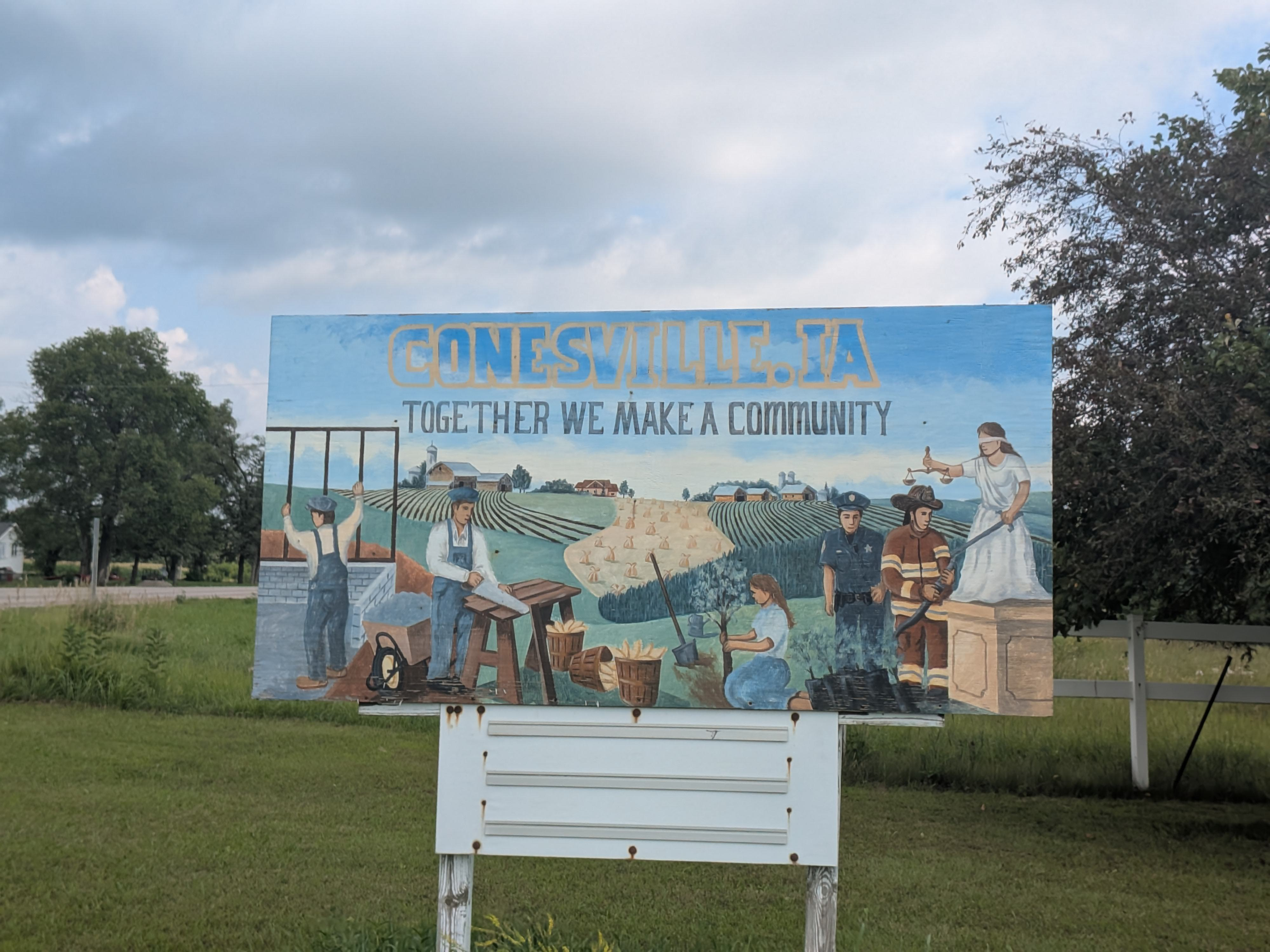
- Welcome Sign in Conesville

- Location of Conesville, Iowa
- Coordinates: 41°22′36″N 91°20′55″W
- Country: United States
- State: Iowa
- County: Muscatine

Area
  - Total: 0.36 sq mi (0.93 km^{2})
  - Land: 0.36 sq mi (0.93 km^{2})
  - Water: 0 sq mi (0.00 km^{2})
- Elevation: 610 ft (190 m)

Population (2020)
  - Total: 352
  - Density: 981.8/sq mi (379.06/km^{2})
- Time zone: UTC-6 (Central (CST))
  - Summer (DST): UTC-5 (CDT)
- ZIP code: 52739
- Area code: 319
- FIPS code: 19-15645
- GNIS feature ID: 2393618
- Website: conesvilleia.org

Conesville is a city in Muscatine County, Iowa, United States. The population was 352 at the 2020 census. It is part of the Muscatine Micropolitan Statistical Area.

== History ==
Conesville was once a depot on the Burlington, Cedar Rapids and Northern Railway. It was named for Beebe Stewart Cone, a prosperous landowner. Beebe S. Cone had previously established himself as a co-owner of a distillery in Conesville, Ohio. The distillery burned down in 1857, but was not rebuilt by him. By 1870, Cone had established himself as a notable farmer in Orono Township in Muscatine County, Iowa.

In May 2025, Conesville Mayor Tom Van Auken and City Clerk Carol Zuniga raised concerns about a former clerk, Yamira Martinez, misusing funds of $127,000 and asked that the Muscatine County Sheriff's Office investigate. After the sheriff began investigating, the city additionally asked for an audit from the state auditor. In June 2025, State Auditor Rob Sand concluded that investigation. Martinez was arrested by the Muscatine County Sheriff's Office for "two counts of ongoing criminal conduct, two counts of theft, and two counts related to forgery and fraud" in June 2025.

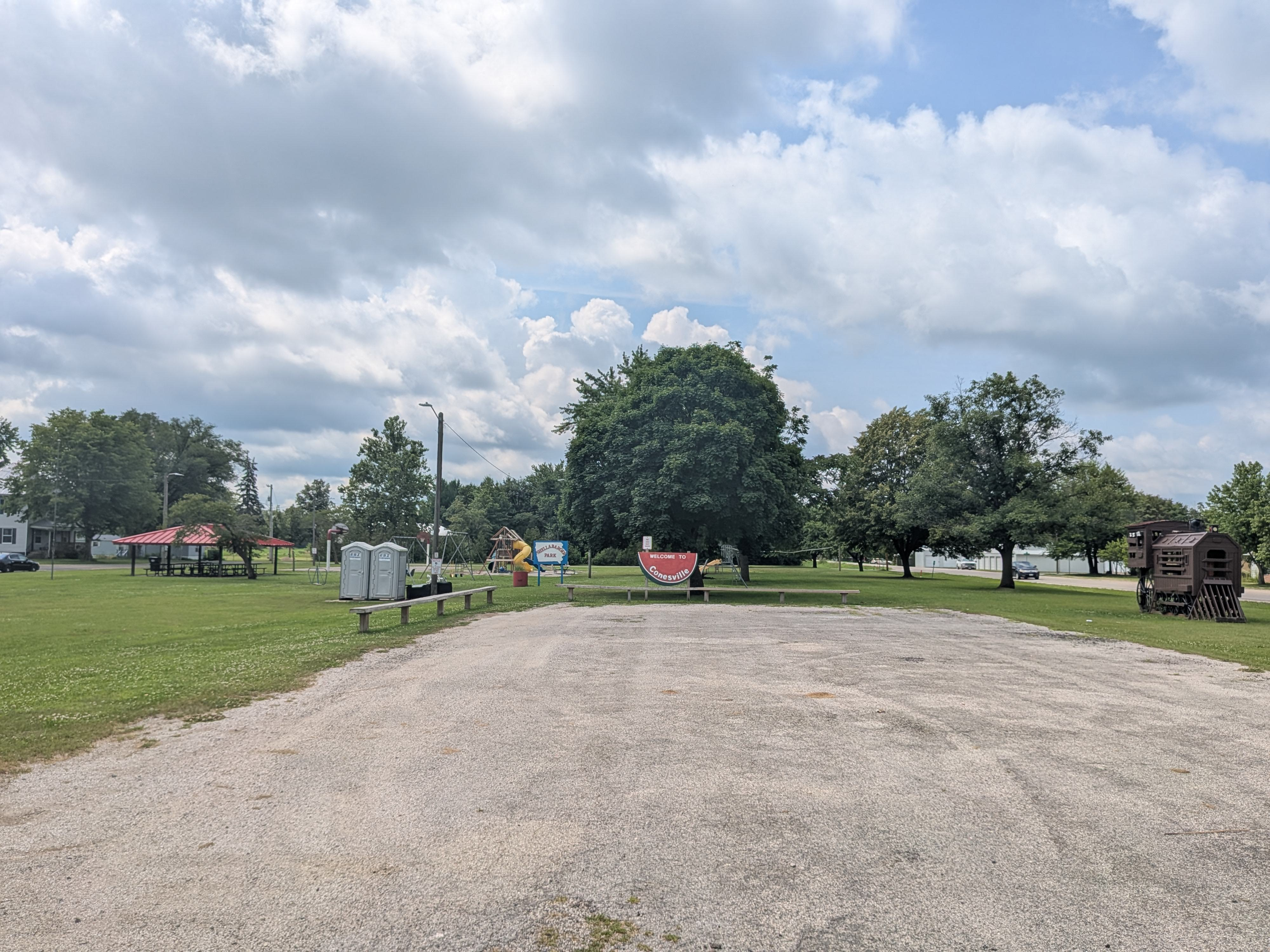
Shella Barger Park

== Geography ==
According to the United States Census Bureau, the city has a total area of 0.36 square miles (0.93 km^{2}), all land.

== Demographics ==
Historical populations
Year	Pop.	±%
1910	347	—
1920	307	−11.5%
1930	254	−17.3%
1940	302	+18.9%
1950	252	−16.6%
1960	248	−1.6%
1970	295	+19.0%
1980	301	+2.0%
1990	334	+11.0%
2000	424	+26.9%
2010	432	+1.9%
2020	352	−18.5%
Source:"U.S. Census website". United States Census Bureau. and Iowa Data Center; Source: U.S. Decennial Census

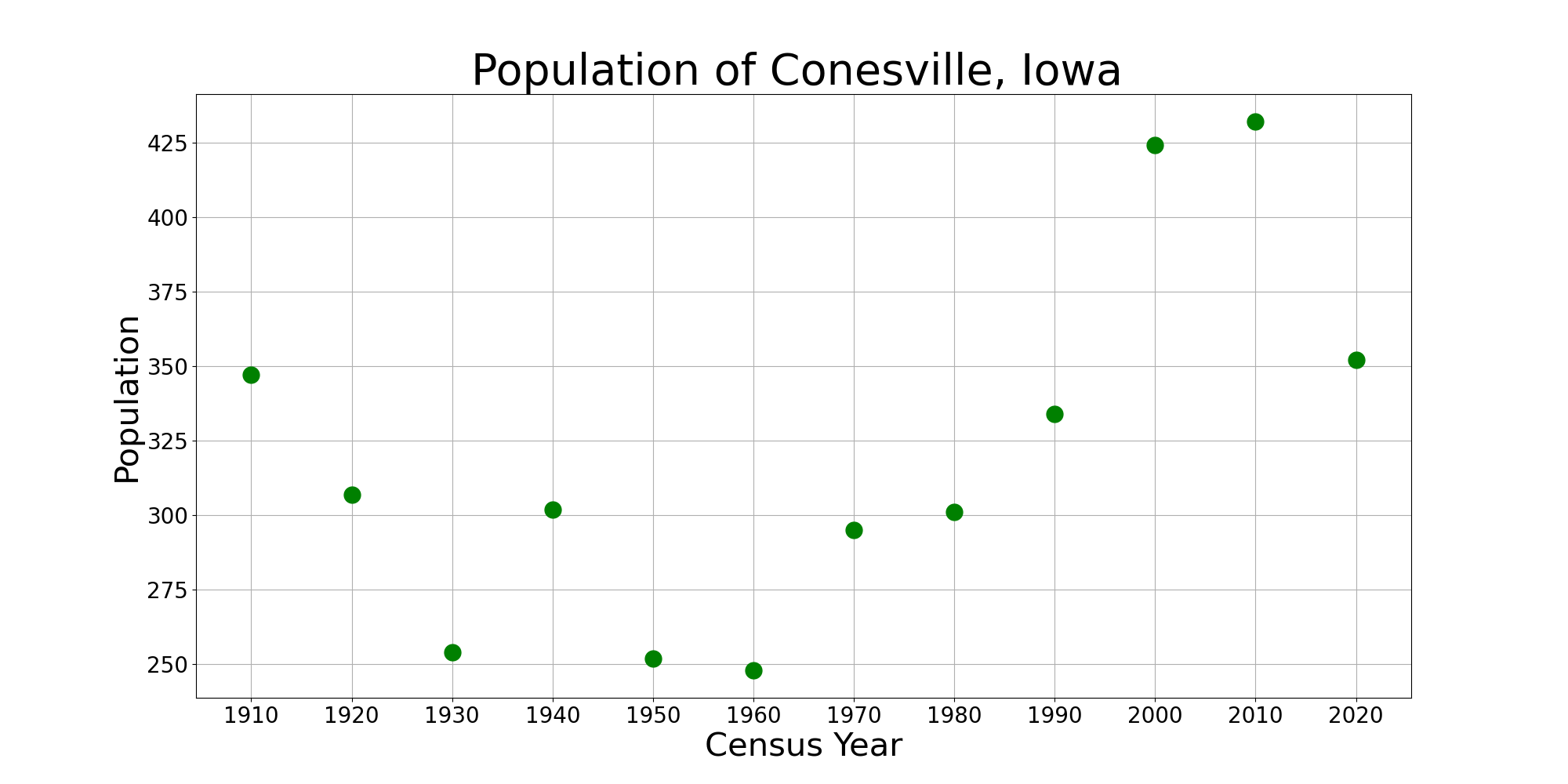
The population of Conesville, Iowa from US census data

=== 2020 census ===
As of the census of 2020, there were 352 people, 135 households, and 91 families residing in the city. The population density was 981.8 inhabitants per square mile (379.1/km^{2}). There were 147 housing units at an average density of 410.0 per square mile (158.3/km^{2}). The racial makeup of the city was 51.7% White, 4.3% Black or African American, 0.0% Native American, 3.1% Asian, 0.0% Pacific Islander, 30.4% from other races and 10.5% from two or more races. Hispanic or Latino persons of any race comprised 54.0% of the population.

Of the 135 households, 34.8% of which had children under the age of 18 living with them, 41.5% were married couples living together, 11.9% were cohabitating couples, 20.7% had a female householder with no spouse or partner present and 25.9% had a male householder with no spouse or partner present. 32.6% of all households were non-families. 22.2% of all households were made up of individuals, 8.1% had someone living alone who was 65 years old or older.

The median age in the city was 38.0 years. 23.6% of the residents were under the age of 20; 7.1% were between the ages of 20 and 24; 31.0% were from 25 and 44; 24.1% were from 45 and 64; and 14.2% were 65 years of age or older. The gender makeup of the city was 52.3% male and 47.7% female.

=== 2010 census ===
As of the census of 2010, there were 432 people, 132 households, and 105 families living in the city. The population density was 1,200.0 inhabitants per square mile (463.3/km^{2}). There were 153 housing units at an average density of 425.0 per square mile (164.1/km^{2}). The racial makeup of the city was 57.6% White, 0.7% African American, 1.6% Asian, 38.2% from other races, and 1.9% from two or more races. Hispanic or Latino of any race were 63.0% of the population.

There were 132 households, of which 52.3% had children under the age of 18 living with them, 50.0% were married couples living together, 15.9% had a female householder with no husband present, 13.6% had a male householder with no wife present, and 20.5% were non-families. 15.9% of all households were made up of individuals, and 6.1% had someone living alone who was 65 years of age or older. The average household size was 3.27 and the average family size was 3.66.

The median age in the city was 29 years. 35.9% of residents were under the age of 18; 9.2% were between the ages of 18 and 24; 30.6% were from 25 to 44; 16.7% were from 45 to 64; and 7.6% were 65 years of age or older. The gender makeup of the city was 52.3% male and 47.7% female.

=== 2000 census ===
As of the census of 2000, there were 424 people, 133 households, and 100 families living in the city. The population density was 1,147.7 inhabitants per square mile (443.1/km^{2}). There were 144 housing units at an average density of 389.8 per square mile (150.5/km^{2}). The racial makeup of the city was 78.77% White, 0.24% Asian, 20.28% from other races, and 0.71% from two or more races. Hispanic or Latino of any race were 58.96% of the population.

There were 133 households, out of which 42.1% had children under the age of 18 living with them, 54.9% were married couples living together, 13.5% had a female householder with no husband present, and 24.1% were non-families. 18.8% of all households were made up of individuals, and 4.5% had someone living alone who was 65 years of age or older. The average household size was 3.19 and the average family size was 3.62.

In the city, the population was spread out, with 36.3% under the age of 18, 7.8% from 18 to 24, 33.3% from 25 to 44, 14.2% from 45 to 64, and 8.5% who were 65 years of age or older. The median age was 28 years. For every 100 females, there were 126.7 males. For every 100 females age 18 and over, there were 114.3 males.

The median income for a household in the city was $29,464, and the median income for a family was $30,000. Males had a median income of $28,000 versus $19,167 for females. The per capita income for the city was $10,097. About 11.1% of families and 13.9% of the population were below the poverty line, including 19.3% of those under age 18 and 4.9% of those age 65 or over.
