= Montpelier Township, Muscatine County, Iowa =

Township in Muscatine County, Iowa, U.S.

Coordinates: 41.4700°N 90.8367°W

Montpelier Township is a township in Muscatine County, Iowa, in the United States.

== History ==
Montpelier Township was first settled in the Spring of 1834 (192 years ago) and was organized in 1842. The first settlers were natives of Vermont, and they named the township for the capital of that state, Montpelier.
