= Orono Township, Muscatine County, Iowa =

Township in Muscatine County, Iowa, U.S.

Coordinates: 41.3803°N 91.3358°W

Orono Township is a township in Muscatine County, Iowa, in the United States.

== History ==
Orono Township was organized on March 8, 1858. It is located in the southwest corner of the county. The city of Conesville began as a railroad depot in the township.
