= Fruitland, Iowa =

- City
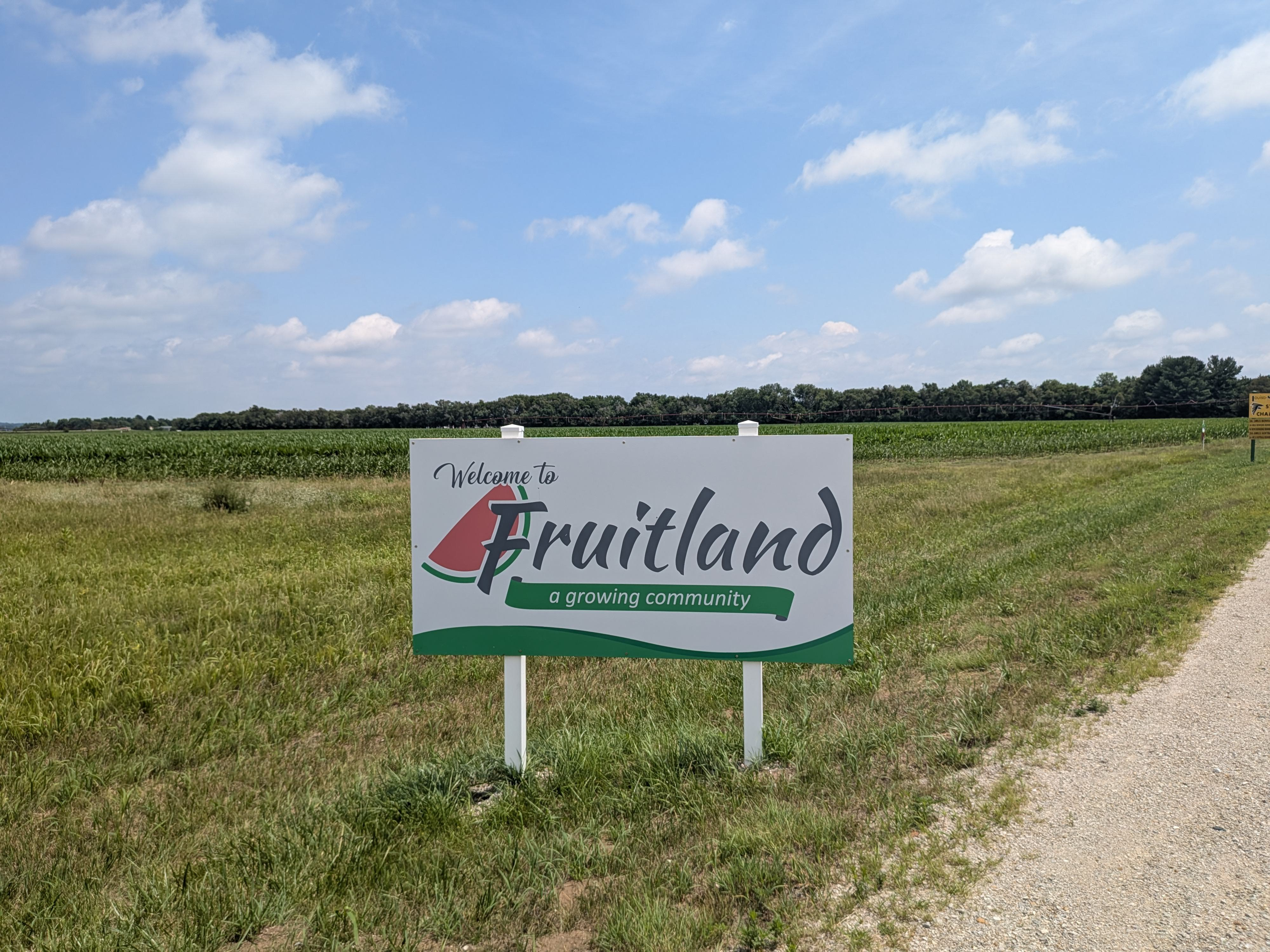
- Welcome Sign in Fruitland

- Location of Fruitland, Iowa
- Coordinates: 41°20′52″N 91°07′30″W
- Country: United States
- State: Iowa
- County: Muscatine
- Incorporated: August 24, 1972

Area
  - Total: 1.80 sq mi (4.65 km^{2})
  - Land: 1.80 sq mi (4.65 km^{2})
  - Water: 0 sq mi (0.00 km^{2})
- Elevation: 548 ft (167 m)

Population (2020)
  - Total: 963
  - Density: 536.0/sq mi (206.94/km^{2})
- Time zone: UTC-6 (Central (CST))
  - Summer (DST): UTC-5 (CDT)
- ZIP code: 52749
- Area code: 563
- FIPS code: 19-29280
- GNIS feature ID: 2394831
- Website: fruitlandia.com

Fruitland is a city in Muscatine County, Iowa, United States. The population was 963 at the time of the 2020 census. It is part of the Muscatine Micropolitan Statistical Area.

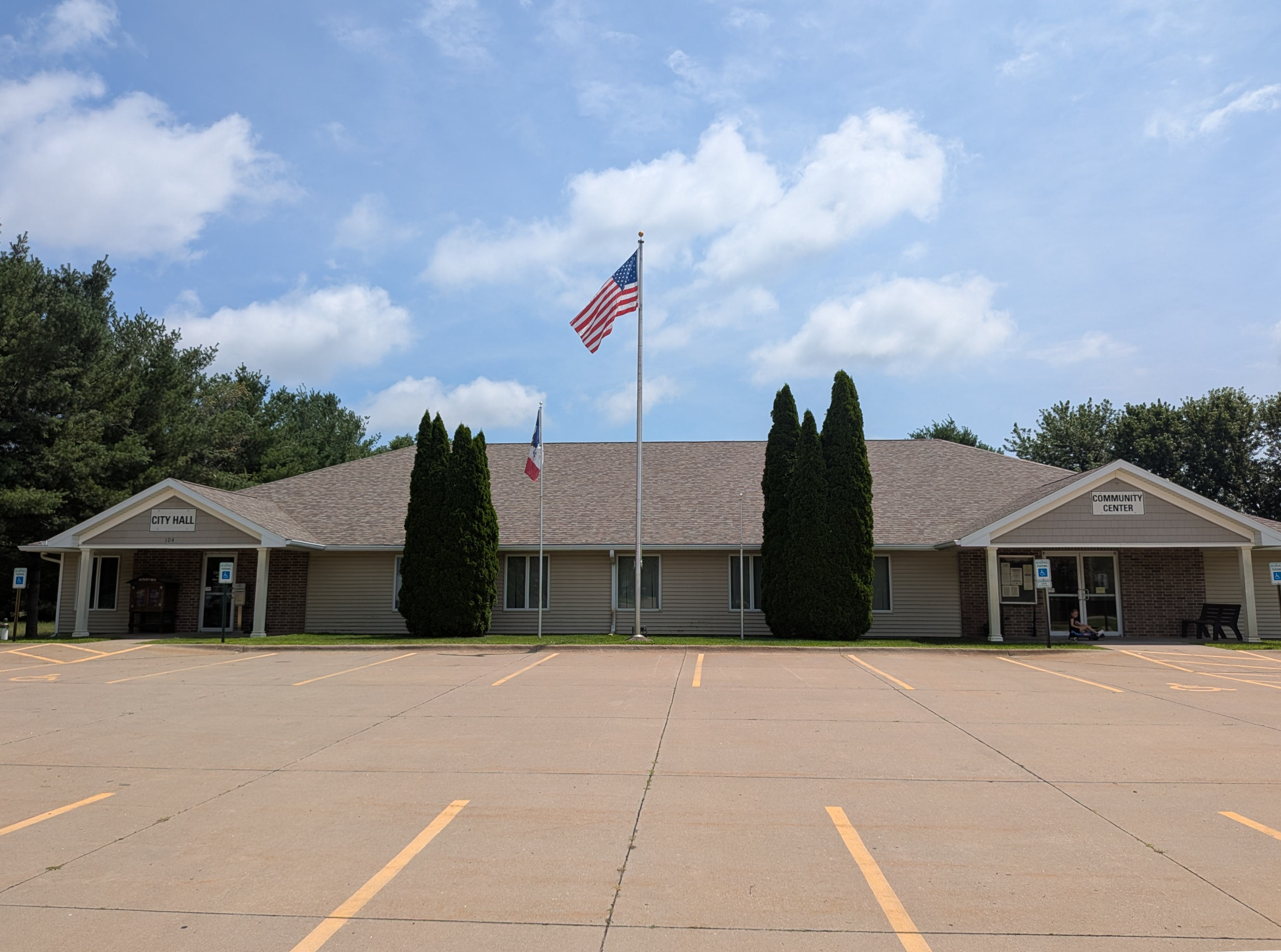
City Hall and Community Center

== Geography ==
According to the United States Census Bureau, the city has a total area of 1.80 square miles (4.66 km^{2}), all land.

== Demographics ==
Historical populations
Year	Pop.	±%
1980	461	—
1990	511	+10.8%
2000	703	+37.6%
2010	977	+39.0%
2020	963	−1.4%
Source:"U.S. Census website". United States Census Bureau. and Iowa Data Center; Source: U.S. Decennial Census

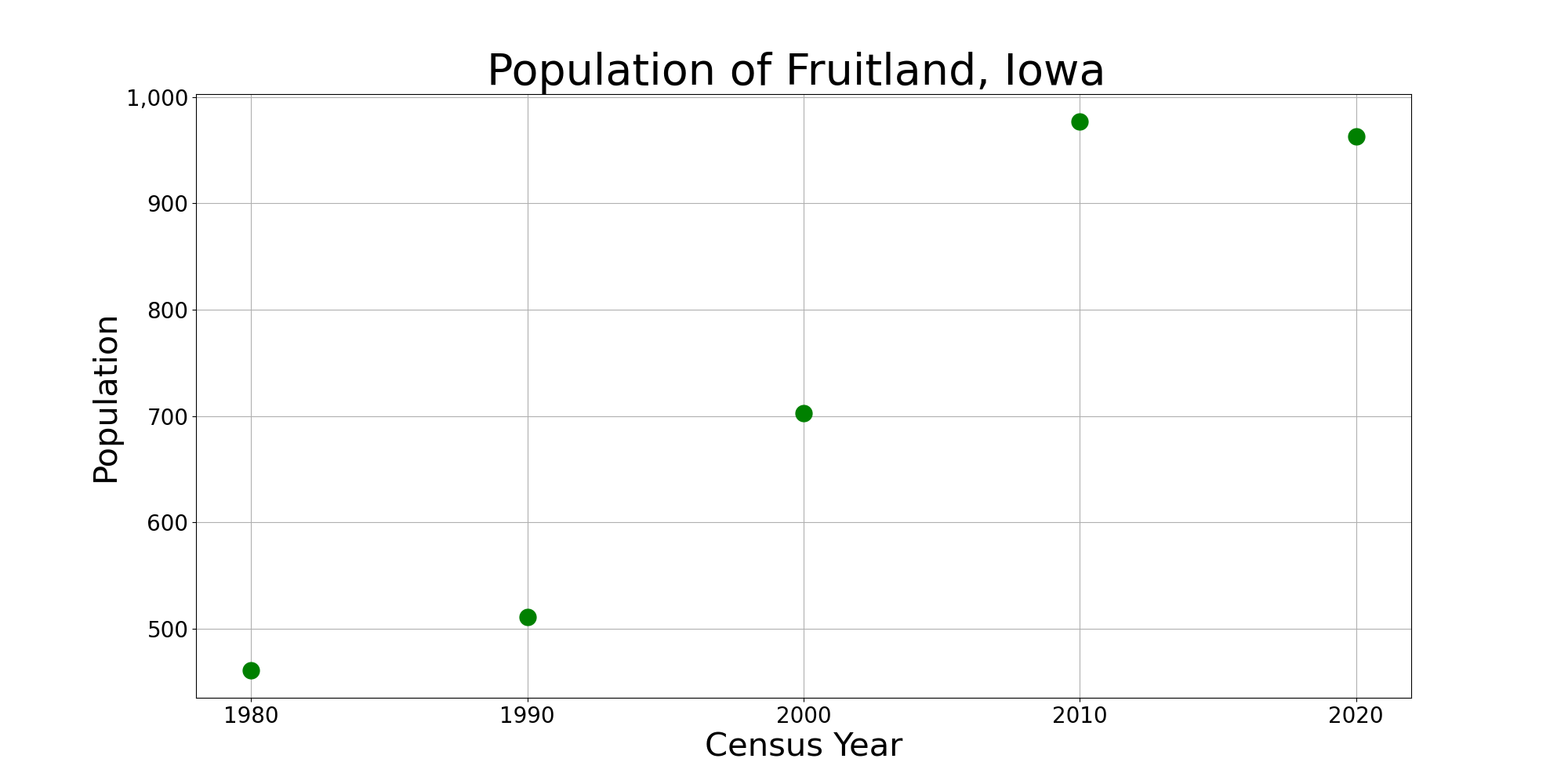
The population of Fruitland, Iowa from US census data

=== 2020 census ===
As of the census of 2020, there were 963 people, 337 households, and 280 families residing in the city. The population density was 534.5 inhabitants per square mile (206.4/km^{2}). There were 346 housing units at an average density of 192.1 per square mile (74.2/km^{2}). The racial makeup of the city was 92.6% White, 0.5% Black or African American, 0.0% Native American, 0.0% Asian, 0.0% Pacific Islander, 2.3% from other races and 4.6% from two or more races. Hispanic or Latino persons of any race comprised 6.3% of the population.

Of the 337 households, 41.5% of which had children under the age of 18 living with them, 68.0% were married couples living together, 7.1% were cohabitating couples, 13.4% had a female householder with no spouse or partner present and 11.6% had a male householder with no spouse or partner present. 16.9% of all households were non-families. 12.8% of all households were made up of individuals, 6.5% had someone living alone who was 65 years old or older.

The median age in the city was 40.7 years. 29.8% of the residents were under the age of 20; 3.7% were between the ages of 20 and 24; 23.4% were from 25 and 44; 29.5% were from 45 and 64; and 13.6% were 65 years of age or older. The gender makeup of the city was 50.4% male and 49.6% female.

=== 2010 census ===
As of the census of 2010, there were 977 people, 331 households, and 277 families living in the city. The population density was 542.8 inhabitants per square mile (209.6/km^{2}). There were 342 housing units at an average density of 190.0 per square mile (73.4/km^{2}). The racial makeup of the city was 96.7% White, 0.2% Native American, 0.4% Asian, 2.3% from other races, and 0.4% from two or more races. Hispanic or Latino of any race were 4.4% of the population.

There were 331 households, of which 41.1% had children under the age of 18 living with them, 71.3% were married couples living together, 7.3% had a female householder with no husband present, 5.1% had a male householder with no wife present, and 16.3% were non-families. 10.6% of all households were made up of individuals, and 5.1% had someone living alone who was 65 years of age or older. The average household size was 2.95 and the average family size was 3.18.

The median age in the city was 36.5 years. 29.4% of residents were under the age of 18; 6.6% were between the ages of 18 and 24; 29.8% were from 25 to 44; 27.4% were from 45 to 64; and 6.9% were 65 years of age or older. The gender makeup of the city was 49.1% male and 50.9% female.

=== 2000 census ===
As of the census of 2000, there were 703 people, 242 households, and 205 families living in the city. The population density was 390.6 inhabitants per square mile (150.8/km^{2}). There were 249 housing units at an average density of 138.4 per square mile (53.4/km^{2}). The racial makeup of the city was 97.30% White, 0.14% Native American, 0.28% Asian, 2.28% from other races. Hispanic or Latino of any race were 3.70% of the population.

There were 242 households, out of which 39.3% had children under the age of 18 living with them, 72.3% were married couples living together, 7.9% had a female householder with no husband present, and 14.9% were non-families. 9.1% of all households were made up of individuals, and 2.9% had someone living alone who was 65 years of age or older. The average household size was 2.90 and the average family size was 3.06.

In the city, the population was spread out, with 26.3% under the age of 18, 8.0% from 18 to 24, 32.7% from 25 to 44, 27.0% from 45 to 64, and 6.0% who were 65 years of age or older. The median age was 35 years. For every 100 females, there were 103.2 males. For every 100 females age 18 and over, there were 107.2 males.

The median income for a household in the city was $57,250, and the median income for a family was $57,708. Males had a median income of $42,171 versus $24,464 for females. The per capita income for the city was $20,270. About 1.4% of families and 2.4% of the population were below the poverty line, including 2.7% of those under age 18 and none of those age 65 or over.

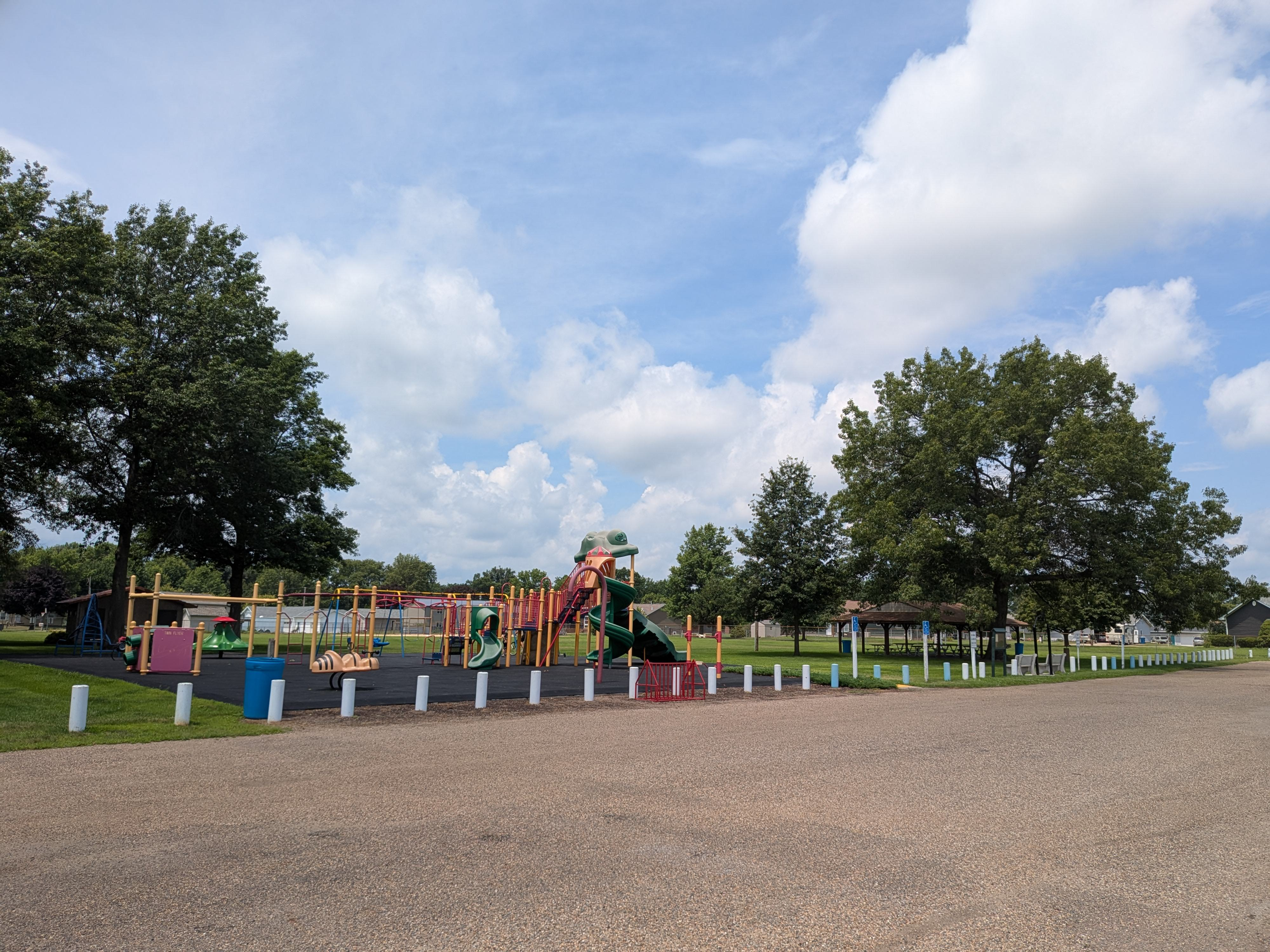
Drake Park

== June 1, 2007 tornado ==
Fruitland and two neighboring cities were struck by an EF-2/EF-3 Tornado on Friday, June 1, 2007. Fruitland City Hall and the Fruitland Post Office were destroyed. Injuries were reported with this storm; however, there were no deaths from the twister. City Hall was moved to a temporary "trailer office" until the new Fruitland Community Center was built and finished later in 2007.

== Education ==
Louisa–Muscatine Community School District operates the area public schools for this municipality.
