= Muscatine County Courthouse =

- U.S. National Register of Historic Places
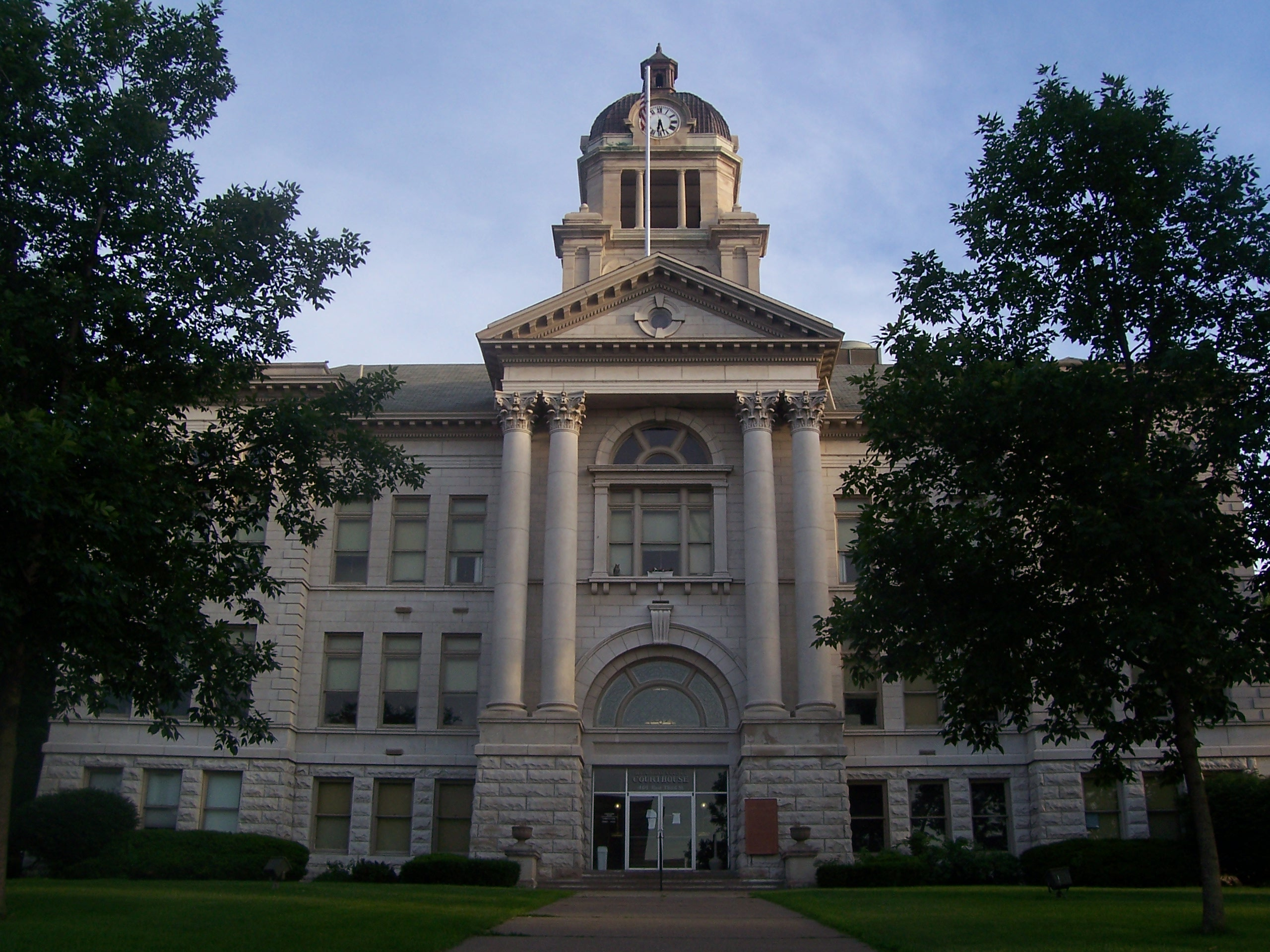

- Location within Iowa Location within the United States
- Interactive map showing the location of Muscatine County Courthouse
- Location: 3rd St. Muscatine, Iowa
- Coordinates: 41°25′28″N 91°2′35″W
- Area: less than one acre
- Built: 1909
- Built by: J.W. McAlpine
- Architect: J.E. Mills
- Architectural style: Beaux Arts
- MPS: County Courthouses in Iowa TR
- NRHP reference No.: 81000260
- Added to NRHP: July 2, 1981

The Muscatine County Courthouse in Muscatine, Iowa, United States, was built in 1909. It was listed on the National Register of Historic Places in 1981 as a part of the County Courthouses in Iowa Thematic Resource. The courthouse is the third building the county has used for court functions and county administration.

== History ==
Muscatine County was established in 1837 and Bloomington, as Muscatine was then called, was named the county seat. Land for a courthouse was secured in town for $1.25 per acre in 1838. The first courthouse was built there in 1840. It was a brick structure with a stone foundation and it was constructed for $15,000. The building was destroyed by fire on December 17, 1864. A second courthouse was built three years later for $29,000. The two-story brick building featured a portico held up by six columns, a dome, and a statue of the Goddess of Justice. High winds took off her arm in which the hand held the scales. The statue was removed from its pedestal several years later after continued deterioration.

The present courthouse was built beginning in 1907 in the same location as the previous courthouse. Before the foundation could be dug, the portico columns from the old building had to be removed. It was designed by Detroit architect J.E. Mills in the Beaux Arts style, and built by J.W. McAlpine of Dixon, Illinois.

== Architecture ==
Located on a large landscaped square near the central business district, the three-story structure is composed of stone and concrete. The main facade features a central portico that is supported by four Corinthian columns that rise from the second floor terminating at the pediment with a round window at the roofline. Pavilions at the ends of the building project from the main structure. A two-stage bell and clock tower with open sides is capped with a dome. The significance of the courthouse is derived from its association with county government, and the political power and prestige of Muscatine as the county seat.
