= Petersburg, Muscatine County, Iowa =

Petersburg, Iowa
- Unincorporated community
- Location within Iowa Location within the United States
- Coordinates: 41°33′36″N 90°47′39″W
- Country: United States
- State: Iowa
- County: Muscatine
- Elevation: 771 ft (235 m)
- Time zone: UTC-6 (Central (CST))
  - Summer (DST): UTC-5 (CDT)
- GNIS feature ID: 464285

Petersburg is an unincorporated community in Muscatine County, Iowa, United States. It lies at an elevation of 771 feet (235 m). The community is part of the Muscatine Micropolitan Statistical Area.
