= Fulton Township, Muscatine County, Iowa =

Township in Muscatine County, Iowa, U.S.

Coordinates: 41.5528°N 90.8264°W

Fulton Township is a township in Muscatine County, Iowa, United States.

== History ==
Fulton Township was organized on March 4, 1857.
