= Lake Township, Muscatine County, Iowa =

Township in Muscatine County, Iowa, U.S.

Coordinates: 41°27′16″N 91°10′43″W

Lake Township is a township in Muscatine County, Iowa, United States.

== History ==
Lake Township was organized on July 2, 1859.
