= Cedar Township, Muscatine County, Iowa =

Township in Muscatine County, Iowa, U.S.

Coordinates: 41.3753°N 91.2875°W

Cedar Township is a township in Muscatine County, Iowa, in the United States.

== History ==
Cedar Township was organized in 1842. The Cedar River forms its western boundary.
