= Goshen Township, Muscatine County, Iowa =

Township in Muscatine County, Iowa, U.S.

Coordinates: 41.5597°N 91.1858°W

Goshen Township is a township in Muscatine County, Iowa, United States.

== History ==
Goshen Township was organized in 1857. It was first settled around 1837.
