= Moscow Township, Muscatine County, Iowa =

Township in Muscatine County, Iowa, U.S.

Coordinates: 41.5486°N 91.0869°W

Moscow Township is a townships in Muscatine County, Iowa, United States.

Moscow Township was organized in 1842.
