= Wapsinonoc Township, Muscatine County, Iowa =

Township in Muscatine County, Iowa, U.S.

Coordinates: 41.5553°N 91.2975°W

Wapsinonoc Township is a township in Muscatine County, Iowa, United States.

== History ==
Wapsinonoc was first settled in 1836. Wapsinonoc Township is named for Wapsinonoc Creek, a Cedar River tributary that flows through the township. Wapsinonoc is derived from an Indian name meaning "smooth-surfaced and meandering stream".
