= Port Allen, Iowa =

- Unincorporated community
- Location within Iowa Location within the United States
- Coordinates: 41°20′16″N 91°21′12″W
- Country: United States
- State: Iowa
- County: Muscatine
- Elevation: 607 ft (185 m)
- Time zone: UTC-6 (Central (CST))
  - Summer (DST): UTC-5 (CDT)
- Area code: 319
- GNIS feature ID: 465523

Port Allen is an unincorporated community in Iowa, United States, located along the Louisa-Muscatine County line on Iowa Highway 70. It was formerly a thriving town, but today is merely a housing sub-division.

Port Allen was platted in 1871 by Cyril Carpenter.
