= Muscatine County, Iowa =

County in Iowa, United States

- County
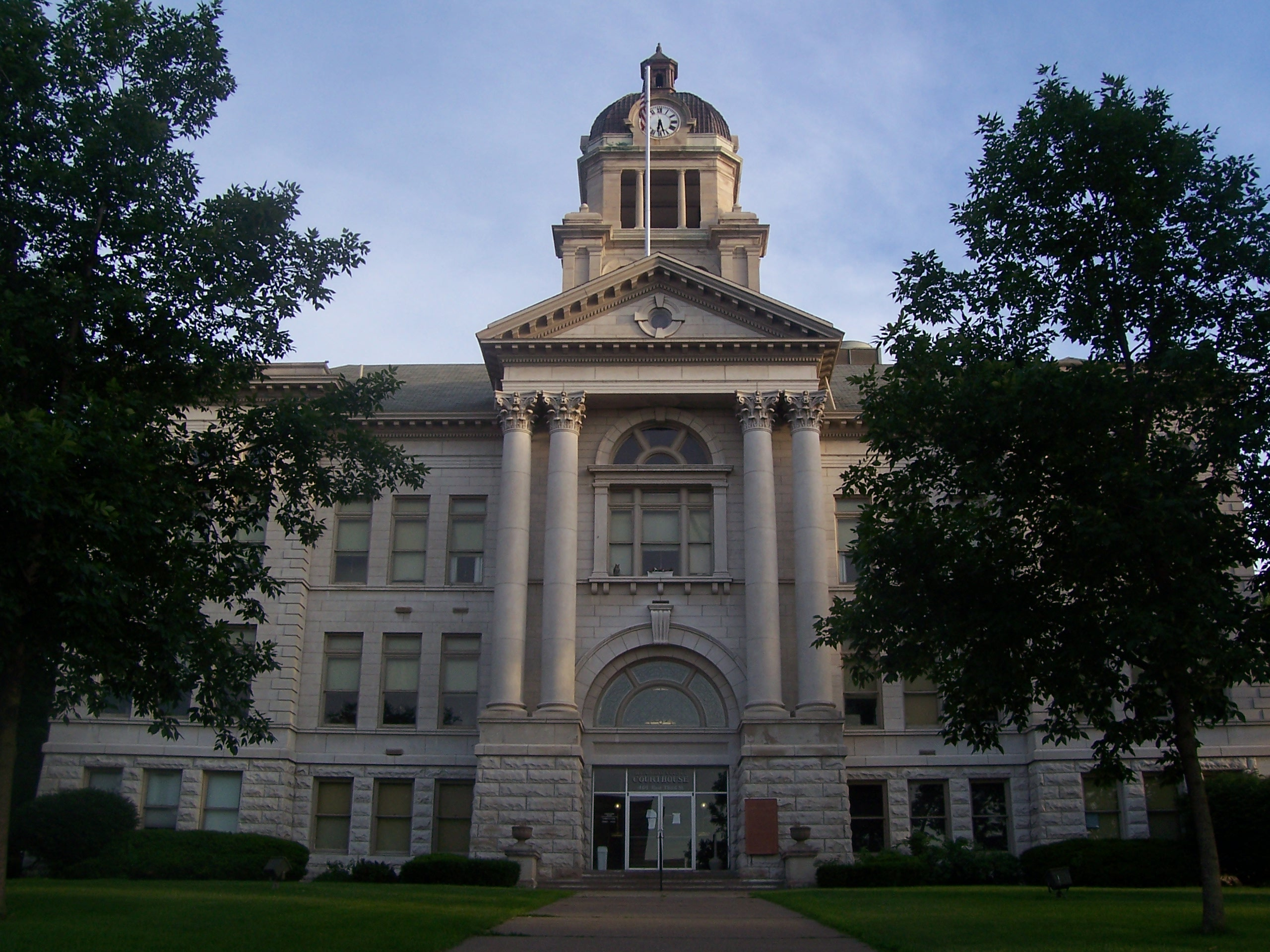
- The Muscatine County Courthouse in Muscatine

- Location within the U.S. state of Iowa
- Coordinates: 41°28′52″N 91°07′11″W
- Country: United States
- State: Iowa
- Founded: December 7, 1836
- Named for: Mascouten tribe
- Seat: Muscatine
- Largest city: Muscatine

Area
  - Total: 449 sq mi (1,160 km^{2})
  - Land: 437 sq mi (1,130 km^{2})
  - Water: 12 sq mi (31 km^{2}) 2.6%

Population (2020)
  - Total: 43,235
  - Estimate (2025): 41,853 ▼
  - Density: 98.9/sq mi (38.2/km^{2})
- Time zone: UTC−6 (Central)
  - Summer (DST): UTC−5 (CDT)
- Congressional district: 1st
- Website: muscatinecountyiowa.gov
- Iowa county number 70

Muscatine County is a county located in the U.S. state of Iowa. As of the 2020 census, the population was 43,235. The county seat is Muscatine. The southeastern border is formed by the Mississippi River. Muscatine County comprises the Muscatine micropolitan area (a Micropolitan Statistical Area), which is included in the Davenport-Moline, IA-IL Combined Statistical Area (CSA). That CSA has a population of 474,226, making it the 90th-largest CSA in the nation.

== History ==
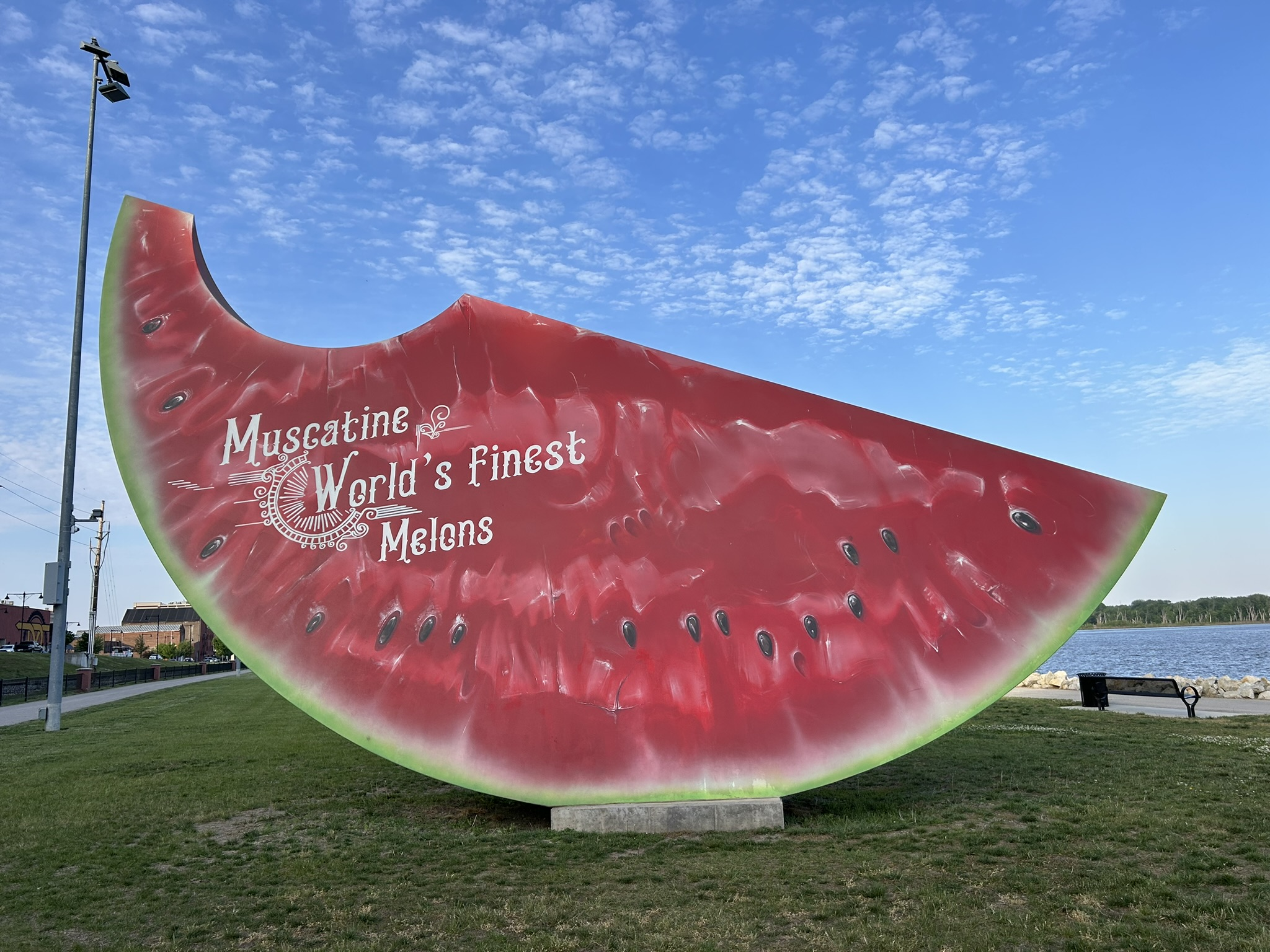
Statue honoring Muscatine's melon industry.

Muscatine County was formed in December 1836 as a part of Wisconsin Territory, partitioned from Des Moines County, which had been organized two years previously. One history suggests that the county was named for Muscatine Island in the Mississippi River. The island lies opposite Muscatine County and was believed to be named after the Mascouten tribe, Algonquian-speaking Native Americans who lived in the area before being driven west by settler encroachment and other tribes.

Colonel George Davenport of Illinois sent three representatives into the territory in 1833 to establish a trade post. They were the first European Americans to settle there. In the same year, James W. Casey and John Vanatta came to the area. They opened a supply depot for steamboats on June 1, 1833, and named it Casey's Woodpile (since steamboats used wood as fuel). Muscatine County became part of Iowa Territory on July 4, 1838, when it was established by partitioning the area from Wisconsin Territory. The first public land sale was held in November 1838. One year later, officials began construction of the first courthouse and associated jail. A second jail, known as the "Old Jail", was built in 1857.

The first courthouse was destroyed by fire on December 23, 1864. By 1866 a replacement stood on the same site. The present courthouse opened on September 26, 1907.

During the late 1800s and early 1900s, the area near Muscatine became well known for producing high-quality melons due to its sandy soil and long, warm growing season.

== Geography ==
According to the United States Census Bureau, the county has a total area of 449 square miles (1,160 km^{2}), of which 437 square miles (1,130 km^{2}) is land and 12 square miles (31 km^{2}) (2.6%) is water.

=== Adjacent counties ===
- Cedar County (north)
- Johnson County (northwest)
- Louisa County (south, southwest)
- Rock Island County, Illinois (east), across the Mississippi River
- Scott County (northeast)

== Transportation ==
=== Transit ===
- MuscaBus

=== Major highways ===
- U.S. Highway 6 – enters from Cedar County, west of Wilton, runs south two miles, then continues west and west-northwest to the northwest corner of the county, exiting into Johnson County.
- U.S. Highway 61 – enters from Louisa County, southwest of Fruitland. Runs northeast through the county, passing Muscatine, before turning east to enter Scott County at Blue Grass.
- Iowa Highway 22 – begins at an intersection with Iowa 70, three miles east of Nichols. Runs east and southeast to an intersection with US 61, west of Muscatine.
- Iowa Highway 38 – begins at an intersection with US 6, three miles south of Wilton. Runs south to an intersection with US 61, north of Muscatine.
- Iowa Highway 70 – enters from Louisa County at the southwest corner of Muscatine County. Runs north, northeast and east to Cedar County, passing Nichols and West Liberty.
- Iowa Highway 92 - enters Muscatine County (and state of Iowa), running northwest across the historic Norbert F. Beckey Bridge into central Muscatine. Runs southwest along the Mississippi River to intersection with US 61, southwest of Muscatine.

=== Other roadway designations ===
- Great River Road - system of roadways marking north–south routes across the conterminous US, and generally passing through Iowa.

=== County highways ===
- County Highway F58 (formerly Hwy 927)
- County Highway F62
- County Highway F65
- County Highway F70 (155th St)
- County Highway G14 (180th St)
- County Highway G28 (230th/231st Sts)
- County Highway G34 (275th St)
- County Highway G38 (Fruitland Rd)
- County Highway X34 (Davis Ave)
- County Highway X40 (Garfield Ave)
- County Highway X46 (Kelly Ave/170th St)
- County Highway X61 (Stewart Rd)
- County Highway Y14 (Taylor Ave)
- County Highway Y26 (Vail Ave)
- County Highway Y30 (Western Ave)
- County Highway Y36 (Zachary Ave)

== Demographics ==
Historical population
Census	Pop.	Note	%±
1850	5,731		—
1860	16,444		186.9%
1870	21,688		31.9%
1880	23,170		6.8%
1890	24,504		5.8%
1900	28,242		15.3%
1910	29,505		4.5%
1920	29,042		−1.6%
1930	29,385		1.2%
1940	31,296		6.5%
1950	32,148		2.7%
1960	33,840		5.3%
1970	37,181		9.9%
1980	40,436		8.8%
1990	39,907		−1.3%
2000	41,722		4.5%
2010	42,745		2.5%
2020	43,235		1.1%
2025 (est.)	41,853	▼	−3.2%
U.S. Decennial Census; 1790–1960 1900–1990; 1990–2000 2010–2020

As of the 2000 census, the area had a population of 53,905 (though a July 1, 2009 estimate placed the population at 54,179).

Muscatine County, Iowa racial and ethnic composition Note: the US Census treats Hispanic/Latino as an ethnic category. This table excludes Latinos from the racial categories and assigns them to a separate category. Hispanics/Latinos may be of any race.
Race	Number	Percent
White alone (NH)	32,633	75.48%
Black or African American alone (NH)	1,086	2.51%
Native American or Alaska Native alone (NH)	58	0.13%
Asian alone (NH)	404	0.93%
Pacific Islander alone (NH)	0	0.00%
Other race alone (NH)	104	0.24%
Mixed race or multiracial (NH)	1,181	2.73%
Hispanic or Latino (any race)	7,769	17.97%
Total	43,235	100.00%

=== 2020 census ===
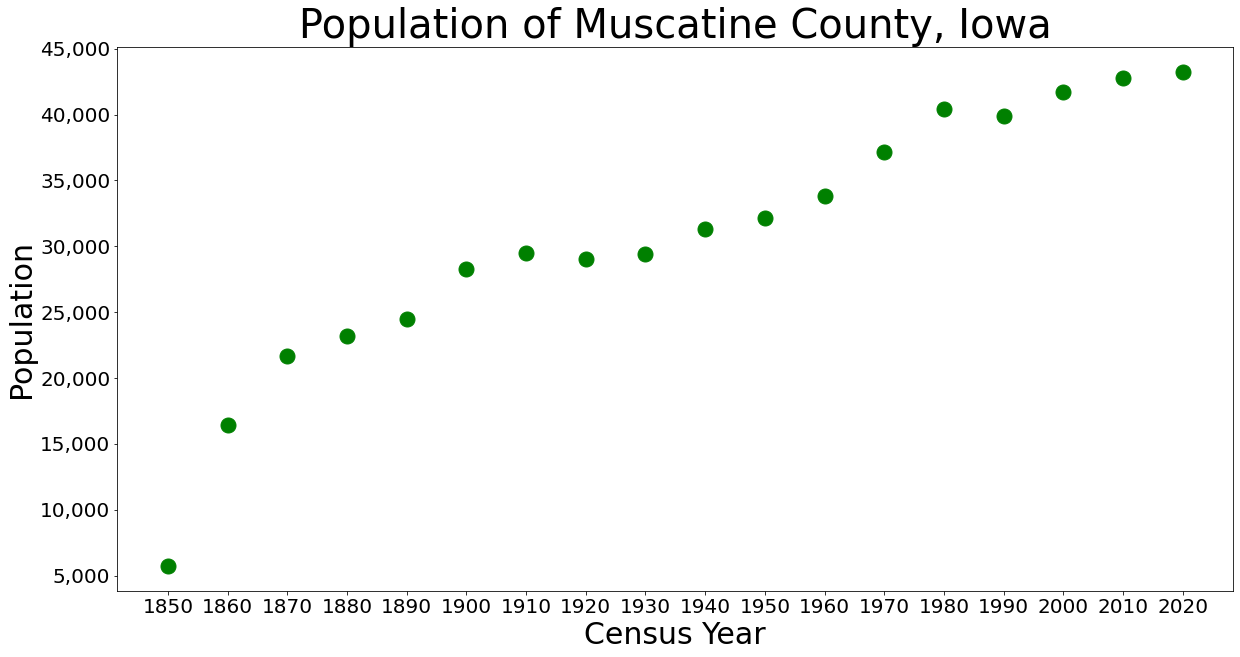
Population of Muscatine County from the U.S. census data

As of the 2020 census, the county had a population of 43,235, a population density of 96.5/sq mi (37.3/km^{2}), and 92.12% of residents reported being of one race. There were 18,366 housing units, of which 16,908 were occupied.

The median age was 39.5 years; 24.2% of residents were under the age of 18 and 17.9% were 65 years of age or older. For every 100 females there were 98.8 males, and for every 100 females age 18 and over there were 98.1 males age 18 and over.

58.2% of residents lived in urban areas, while 41.8% lived in rural areas.

There were 16,908 households in the county, of which 31.4% had children under the age of 18 living in them; 49.5% were married-couple households, 18.4% were households with a male householder and no spouse or partner present, and 23.8% were households with a female householder and no spouse or partner present. About 27.0% of all households were made up of individuals and 12.1% had someone living alone who was 65 years of age or older.

Among the 18,366 housing units, 7.9% were vacant. Owner-occupied units made up 72.3% of occupied housing units and renter-occupied units made up 27.7%; the homeowner vacancy rate was 1.3% and the rental vacancy rate was 8.5%.

The racial makeup of the county was 80.0% White, 2.6% Black or African American, 0.5% American Indian and Alaska Native, 0.9% Asian, less than 0.1% Native Hawaiian and Pacific Islander, 8.0% some other race, and 7.9% two or more races, while Hispanic or Latino residents of any race comprised 18.0% of the population, with the detailed breakdown shown in the table below.

As of the census of 2000, there were 53,905 people, 20,366 households, and 14,599 families residing within the μSA. The racial makeup of the μSA was 91.44% White, 0.60% African American, 0.28% Native American, 0.68% Asian, 0.02% Pacific Islander, 5.71% from other races, and 1.26% from two or more races. Hispanic or Latino of any race were 12.08% of the population. The median income for a household in the μSA was $40,445, and the median income for a family was $46,173. Males had a median income of $33,811 versus $23,439 for females. The per capita income for the μSA was $18,635.

=== 2010 census ===
As of the 2010 census recorded a population of 42,745 in the county, with a population density of 99.7/sq mi (38.5/km^{2}). There were 17,910 housing units, of which 16,412 were occupied.

=== 2000 census ===
As of the 2000 census, there were 41,722 people, 15,847 households, and 11,283 families residing in the county. The population density was 95 inhabitants per square mile (37/km^{2}). There were 16,786 housing units at an average density of 38 per square mile (15/km^{2}). The racial makeup of the county was 90.72% White, 0.70% Black or African American, 0.31% Native American, 0.83% Asian, 0.02% Pacific Islander, 6.05% from other races, and 1.37% from two or more races. 11.92% of the population were Hispanic or Latino of any race.

There were 15,847 households, out of which 34.80% had children under the age of 18 living with them, 57.90% were married couples living together, 9.30% had a female householder with no husband present, and 28.80% were non-families. 24.10% of all households were made up of individuals, and 9.90% had someone living alone who was 65 years of age or older. The average household size was 2.59 and the average family size was 3.07.

In the county, the population was spread out, with 26.90% under the age of 18, 8.60% from 18 to 24, 28.80% from 25 to 44, 22.80% from 45 to 64, and 12.90% who were 65 years of age or older. The median age was 36 years. For every 100 females, there were 98.10 males. For every 100 females age 18 and over, there were 94.90 males.

The median income for a household in the county was $41,803, and the median income for a family was $48,373. Males had a median income of $36,329 versus $24,793 for females. The per capita income for the county was $19,625. About 6.30% of families and 8.90% of the population were below the poverty line, including 10.70% of those under age 18 and 7.70% of those age 65 or over.

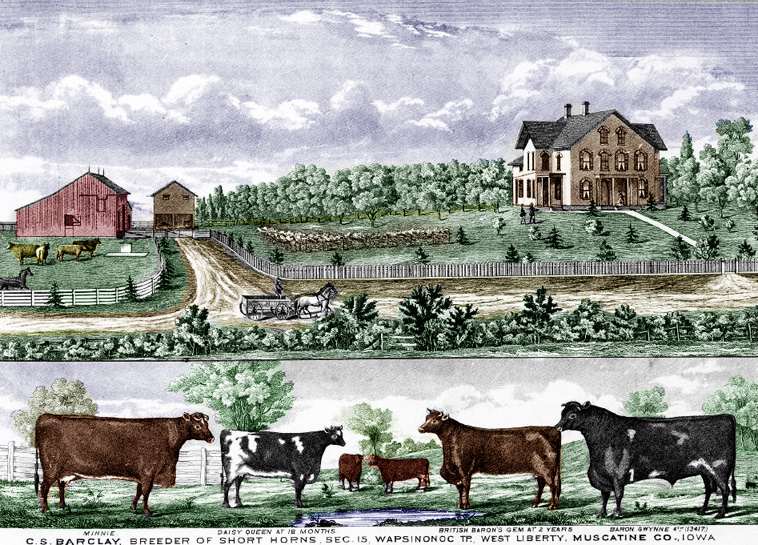
C.S. Barclay farm illustration in 1875

== Communities ==
=== Cities ===
- Atalissa
- Blue Grass (part)
- Conesville
- Durant (part)
- Fruitland
- Muscatine
- Nichols
- Stockton
- Walcott (part)
- West Liberty
- Wilton

=== Census-designated places ===
- Fairport
- Kent Estates
- Montpelier
- Moscow

=== Other unincorporated communities ===
- Ardon
- Cranston
- Hinkeyville
- Midway Beach
- Petersburg
- Port Allen

=== Townships ===
- Bloomington
- Cedar
- Fruitland
- Fulton
- Goshen
- Lake
- Montpelier
- Moscow
- Orono
- Pike
- Seventy-Six
- Sweetland
- Wapsinonoc
- Wilton

=== Population ranking ===
The population ranking of the table is based on the 2020 census of Muscatine County.

† county seat

Rank	City/Town/etc.	Municipal type	Population (2020 Census)	Population (2024 Estimate)
1	† Muscatine	City	23,797	23,233
2	West Liberty	City	3,858	3,889
3	Wilton (partially in Cedar County)	City	2,924	2,917
4	Kent Estates	CDP	2,074	2,280
5	Durant (mostly in Scott and Cedar Counties)	City	1,871	1,888
6	Blue Grass (mostly in Scott County)	City	1,666	1,707
7	Walcott (partially in Scott County)	City	1,551	1,574
8	Fruitland	City	963	987
9	Conesville	City	352	352
10	Nichols	City	340	339
11	Moscow	CDP	290	335
12	Atalissa	City	296	305
13	Fairport	CDP	204	225
14	Montpelier	CDP	186	210
15	Stockton	City	176	170

== Politics ==
United States presidential election results for Muscatine County, Iowa
Year	Republican		Democratic		Third party(ies)	
Year	No.	%	No.	%	No.	%
1896	3,627	55.02%	2,863	43.43%	102	1.55%
1900	3,905	54.92%	3,021	42.49%	184	2.59%
1904	4,036	57.04%	2,555	36.11%	485	6.85%
1908	3,525	49.43%	3,038	42.60%	568	7.97%
1912	789	11.10%	2,679	37.68%	3,642	51.22%
1916	3,929	54.25%	2,694	37.20%	619	8.55%
1920	8,115	70.30%	2,293	19.86%	1,136	9.84%
1924	7,731	64.87%	1,963	16.47%	2,223	18.65%
1928	8,604	67.45%	4,055	31.79%	98	0.77%
1932	6,160	47.69%	6,423	49.73%	334	2.59%
1936	6,332	47.56%	6,593	49.52%	388	2.91%
1940	8,543	59.24%	5,825	40.39%	53	0.37%
1944	7,104	59.38%	4,801	40.13%	58	0.48%
1948	6,003	51.68%	5,466	47.06%	146	1.26%
1952	9,361	61.60%	5,772	37.98%	63	0.41%
1956	8,552	59.81%	5,718	39.99%	28	0.20%
1960	8,555	58.21%	6,135	41.74%	8	0.05%
1964	5,547	40.86%	8,020	59.07%	10	0.07%
1968	7,361	57.18%	4,726	36.71%	787	6.11%
1972	8,436	61.84%	4,917	36.04%	289	2.12%
1976	7,697	53.10%	6,567	45.30%	232	1.60%
1980	7,829	51.69%	5,597	36.96%	1,719	11.35%
1984	9,069	59.79%	5,986	39.46%	113	0.74%
1988	6,904	48.96%	7,059	50.06%	139	0.99%
1992	6,087	36.09%	7,089	42.04%	3,688	21.87%
1996	5,858	38.07%	7,674	49.88%	1,854	12.05%
2000	7,483	46.55%	8,058	50.12%	535	3.33%
2004	9,020	48.19%	9,542	50.98%	155	0.83%
2008	7,929	41.47%	10,920	57.11%	271	1.42%
2012	8,168	41.12%	11,323	57.00%	374	1.88%
2016	9,584	49.32%	8,368	43.06%	1,482	7.63%
2020	10,823	52.36%	9,372	45.34%	476	2.30%
2024	11,152	56.46%	8,212	41.58%	388	1.96%

== Education ==
School districts include:

- Columbus Community School District
- Davenport Community School District
- Durant Community School District
- Louisa-Muscatine Community School District
- Muscatine Community School District
- West Liberty Community School District
- Wilton Community School District

== See also ==
- National Register of Historic Places listings in Muscatine County, Iowa
