= Wilton Township, Muscatine County, Iowa =

Township in Muscatine County, Iowa, U.S.

Coordinates: 41.5578°N 90.9678°W

Wilton Township is a township in Muscatine County, Iowa, United States.

== History ==
Wilton Township was organized in 1853. It was first settled in 1849.
