= Stockton, Iowa =

- City
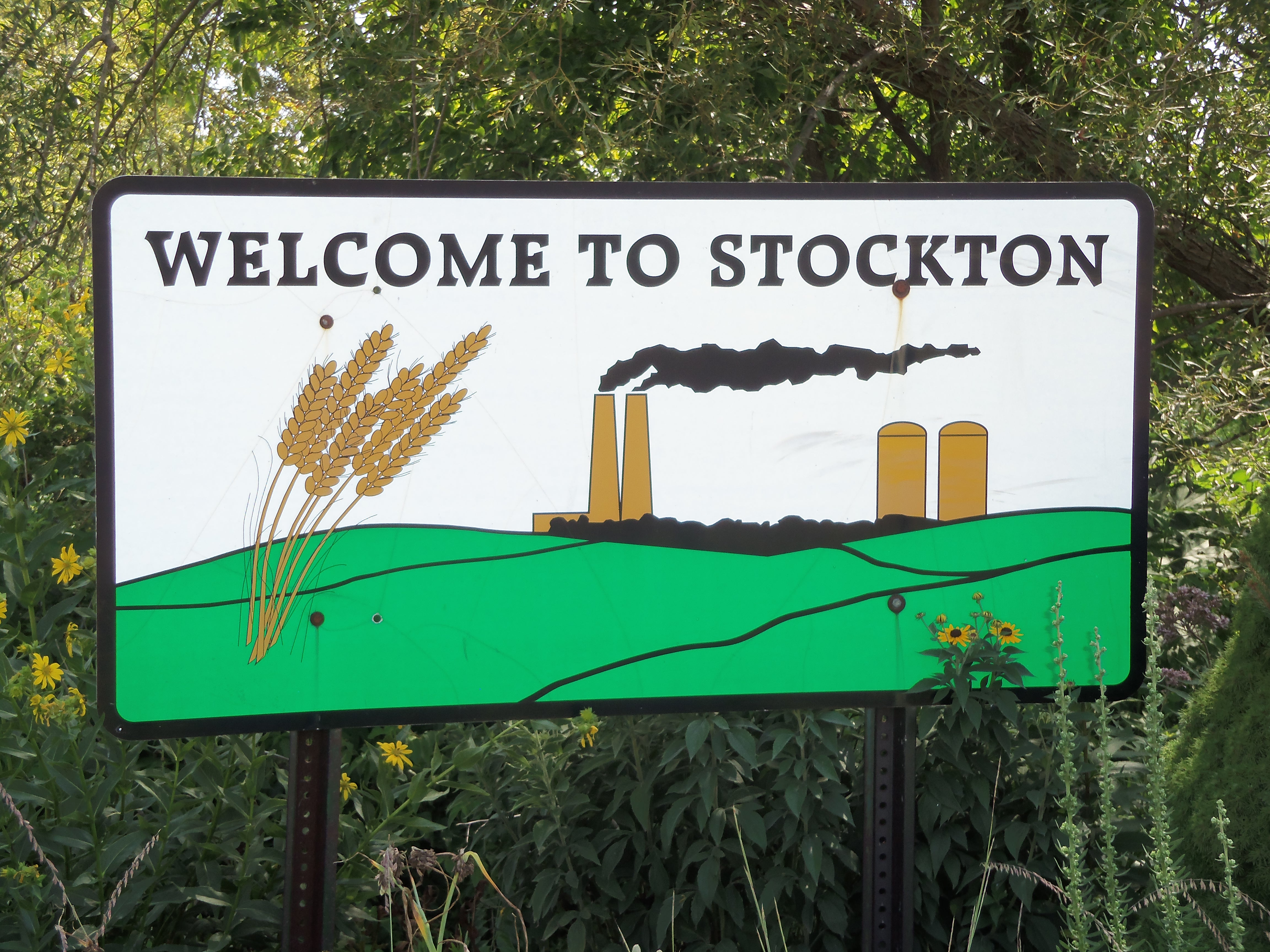
- Welcome sign in Stockton

- Location of Stockton, Iowa
- Coordinates: 41°35′27″N 90°51′23″W
- Country: United States
- State: Iowa
- County: Muscatine

Area
  - Total: 0.11 sq mi (0.28 km^{2})
  - Land: 0.11 sq mi (0.28 km^{2})
  - Water: 0 sq mi (0.00 km^{2})
- Elevation: 735 ft (224 m)

Population (2020)
  - Total: 176
  - Density: 1,619.6/sq mi (625.35/km^{2})
- Time zone: UTC-6 (Central (CST))
  - Summer (DST): UTC-5 (CDT)
- ZIP code: 52769
- Area code: 563
- FIPS code: 19-75450
- GNIS feature ID: 2395972

Stockton is a city in Muscatine County, Iowa, United States. The population was 176 at the time of the 2020 census. It is part of the Muscatine Micropolitan Statistical Area.

== History ==
Stockton was laid out at the time the railroad was built through it. Stockton was a depot on the Chicago, Rock Island and Pacific Railroad.

== Geography ==
According to the United States Census Bureau, the city has a total area of 0.11 square miles (0.28 km^{2}), all land.

== Demographics ==
Historical populations
Year	Pop.	±%
1870	108	—
1880	116	+7.4%
1910	138	+19.0%
1920	128	−7.2%
1930	110	−14.1%
1940	124	+12.7%
1950	165	+33.1%
1960	164	−0.6%
1970	222	+35.4%
1980	240	+8.1%
1990	187	−22.1%
2000	182	−2.7%
2010	197	+8.2%
2020	176	−10.7%
Source:"U.S. Census website". United States Census Bureau. and Iowa Data Center; Source: U.S. Decennial Census

=== 2020 census ===
As of the census of 2020, there were 176 people, 71 households, and 51 families residing in the city. The population density was 1,619.7 inhabitants per square mile (625.4/km^{2}). There were 76 housing units at an average density of 699.4 per square mile (270.0/km^{2}). The racial makeup of the city was 96.6% White, 0.0% Black or African American, 0.6% Native American, 0.0% Asian, 0.0% Pacific Islander, 0.0% from other races and 2.8% from two or more races. Hispanic or Latino persons of any race comprised 0.0% of the population.

Of the 71 households, 35.2% of which had children under the age of 18 living with them, 46.5% were married couples living together, 11.3% were cohabitating couples, 23.9% had a female householder with no spouse or partner present and 18.3% had a male householder with no spouse or partner present. 28.2% of all households were non-families. 21.1% of all households were made up of individuals, 8.5% had someone living alone who was 65 years old or older.

The median age in the city was 38.2 years. 27.3% of the residents were under the age of 20; 7.4% were between the ages of 20 and 24; 25.6% were from 25 and 44; 25.6% were from 45 and 64; and 14.2% were 65 years of age or older. The gender makeup of the city was 48.9% male and 51.1% female.

=== 2010 census ===
As of the census of 2010, there were 197 people, 73 households, and 52 families living in the city. The population density was 1,790.9 inhabitants per square mile (691.5/km^{2}). There were 76 housing units at an average density of 690.9 per square mile (266.8/km^{2}). The racial makeup of the city was 92.9% White, 1.5% African American, 0.5% Native American, 0.5% from other races, and 4.6% from two or more races. Hispanic or Latino of any race were 0.5% of the population.

There were 73 households, of which 43.8% had children under the age of 18 living with them, 52.1% were married couples living together, 8.2% had a female householder with no husband present, 11.0% had a male householder with no wife present, and 28.8% were non-families. 23.3% of all households were made up of individuals, and 1.4% had someone living alone who was 65 years of age or older. The average household size was 2.70 and the average family size was 3.02.

The median age in the city was 36.3 years. 29.4% of residents were under the age of 18; 9.7% were between the ages of 18 and 24; 24.3% were from 25 to 44; 27.9% were from 45 to 64; and 8.6% were 65 years of age or older. The gender makeup of the city was 50.3% male and 49.7% female.

=== 2000 census ===
As of the census of 2000, there were 182 people, 72 households, and 52 families living in the city. The population density was 1,656.3 inhabitants per square mile (639.5/km^{2}). There were 80 housing units at an average density of 728.1 per square mile (281.1/km^{2}). The racial makeup of the city was 99.45% White, 0.55% from other races. Hispanic or Latino of any race were 3.30% of the population.

There were 72 households, out of which 36.1% had children under the age of 18 living with them, 55.6% were married couples living together, 11.1% had a female householder with no husband present, and 26.4% were non-families. 25.0% of all households were made up of individuals, and 5.6% had someone living alone who was 65 years of age or older. The average household size was 2.53 and the average family size was 2.92.

In the city, the population was spread out, with 28.6% under the age of 18, 7.1% from 18 to 24, 30.8% from 25 to 44, 25.3% from 45 to 64, and 8.2% who were 65 years of age or older. The median age was 35 years. For every 100 females, there were 114.1 males. For every 100 females age 18 and over, there were 100.0 males.

The median income for a household in the city was $35,417, and the median income for a family was $28,438. Males had a median income of $28,750 versus $20,313 for females. The per capita income for the city was $17,003. About 6.8% of families and 6.3% of the population were below the poverty line, including 11.1% of those under the age of eighteen and none of those 65 or over.
