= Bloomington Township, Muscatine County, Iowa =

Bloomington Township
- Township
- Location within Iowa Location within the United States
- Coordinates: 41°27′37″N 91°03′58″W
- Country: United States
- State: Iowa
- County: Muscatine
- Elevation: 689 ft (210 m)

Population
  - Total: 24,082

Bloomington Township is a township in Muscatine County, Iowa, United States.

It had a population of 24,082 in 2018.

The township's elevation is listed as 689 feet above mean sea level.
