= Fruitland Township, Muscatine County, Iowa =

Township in Muscatine County, Iowa, U.S.

Coordinates: 41.3753°N 91.1097°W

Fruitland Township is a township in Muscatine County, Iowa, United States.

== History ==
Fruitland Township was organized on November 9, 1887.
