= Midway Beach, Iowa =

- Unincorporated community
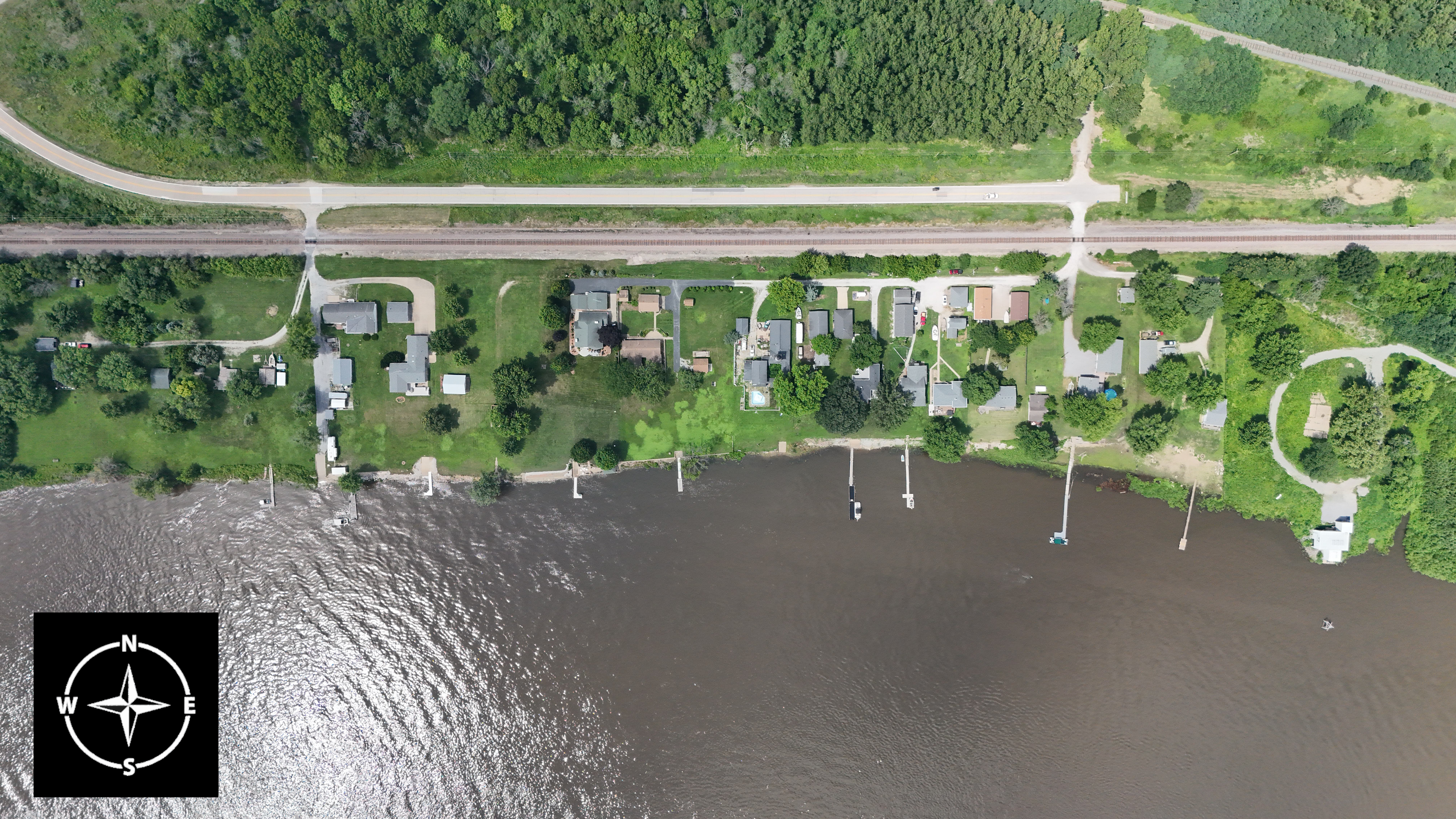
- An aerial view of Midway Beach, taken on July 7, 2025

- Location within Iowa Location within the United States
- Coordinates: 41°27′33″N 90°49′43″W
- Country: United States
- State: Iowa
- County: Muscatine
- Elevation: 571 ft (174 m)
- Time zone: UTC-6 (Central (CST))
  - Summer (DST): UTC-5 (CDT)
- Area code: 563
- GNIS feature ID: 459069

Midway Beach is an unincorporated community in Muscatine County, Iowa, United States. Midway Beach is located on the Mississippi River and the Dakota, Minnesota and Eastern Railroad near Iowa Highway 22, 11.4 miles (18.3 km) east-northeast of Muscatine.
