= Sweetland Township, Muscatine County, Iowa =

Township in Muscatine County, Iowa, U.S.

Coordinates: 41.4708°N 90.9608°W

Sweetland Township is a township in Muscatine County, Iowa, in the United States.

== History ==
Sweetland Township was organized in 1842.
