= Seventy-Six Township, Muscatine County, Iowa =

Township in Muscatine County, Iowa, U.S.

Coordinates: 41.3803°N 91.1994°W

Seventy-Six Township is a township in Muscatine County, Iowa, in the United States.

== History ==
Seventy-Six Township was organized in 1853. It takes its name from its designation as "township 76 north of range 3 west".
