= Muscatine =

Muscatine may refer to:

== People ==
- Charles Muscatine, scholar of medieval literature
- Lissa Muscatine, former journalist and political advisor

== Places ==
- Muscatine County, Iowa
- Muscatine, Iowa (the county seat)
- Muscatine, Iowa micropolitan area

== Other ==
- Louisa–Muscatine Community School District, covering rural portions of both Louisa and Muscatine counties in Iowa
- Muscatine Community College
- Muscatine Community School District
- Muscatine High School
- Muscatine Journal, a newspaper based in Muscatine, Iowa
- Muscatine Mall, a shopping mall in Muscatine, Iowa
- USS Muscatine
