= Schoemaker =

Schoemaker is a Dutch occupational surname meaning "shoemaker" (modern Dutch schoenmaker). People with this name include:

- Andries Schoemaker (1660–1735), Dutch historian and draughtsman
- Arend Schoemaker (1911–1982), Dutch footballer
- Hubert Schoemaker (1950–2006), Dutch biotechnologist
- Jacobus Schoemaker Doyer (1792–1867), Dutch painter
- Jan Schoemaker (1882–1954), Dutch footballer
- Jeremy Schoemaker (born 1974), American web entrepreneur
- Maurice Schoemaker (1890–1964), Belgian composer
- Paul J. H. Schoemaker (born 1949), Dutch management academic
- Richard Schoemaker (1886–1942), Dutch fencer, architect and World War II resistance fighter
- W. R. Schoemaker (1863–1937), American Baptist pastor.
- Willem Schoemaker (1909–1983), first bishop of Purwokerto
- Wolff Schoemaker (1882–1949), Dutch architect, brother of Richard

== See also ==
- Shoemaker (disambiguation)
