= McKee Button Company =

- U.S. National Register of Historic Places
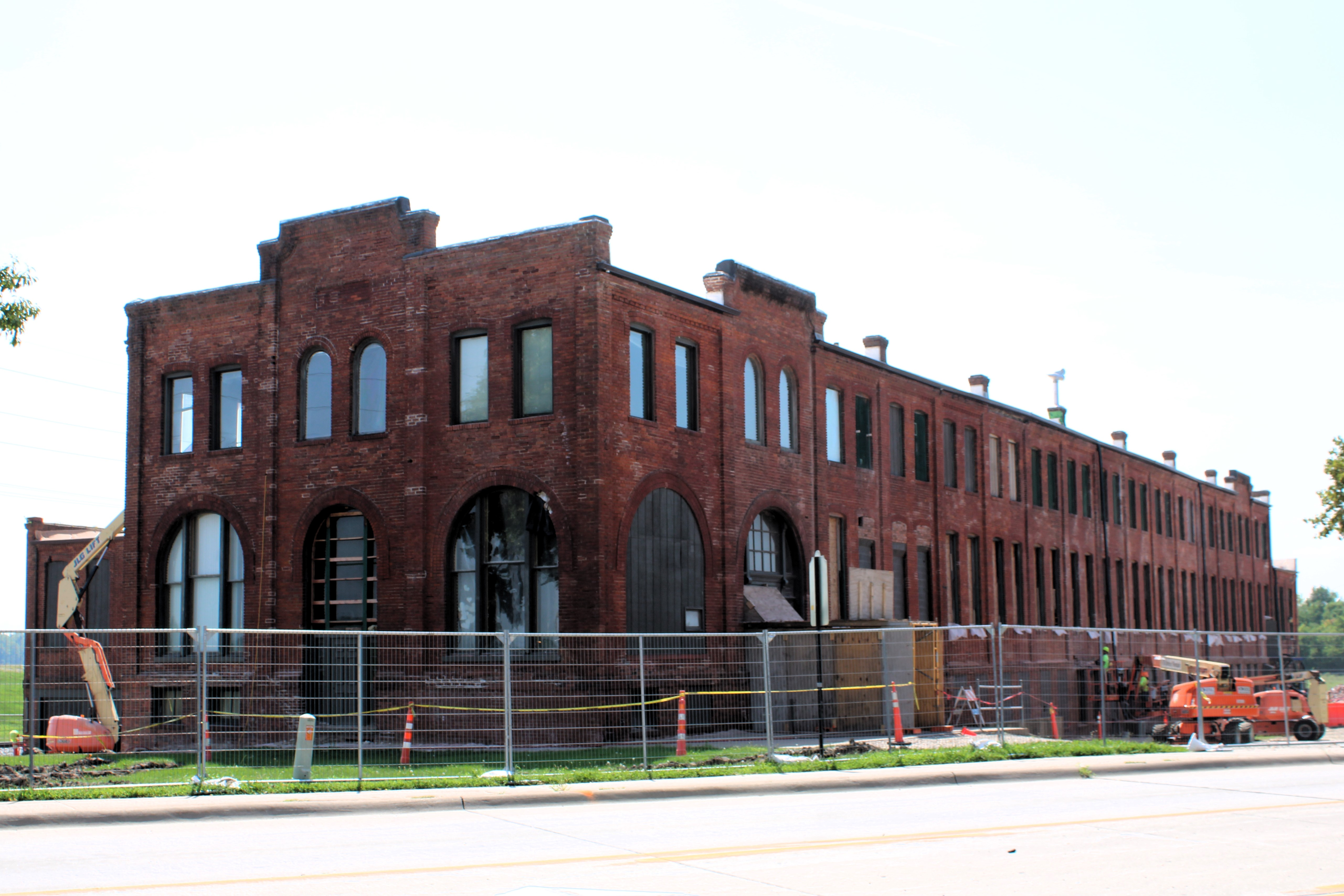

- Location within Iowa Location within the United States
- Location: 1000 Hershey Ave. Muscatine, Iowa
- Coordinates: 41°24′53.5″N 91°03′19″W
- Built: 1907
- NRHP reference No.: 100005784
- Added to NRHP: November 16, 2020

The McKee Button Company is a historic building in Muscatine, Iowa, United States. The city was known as the Pearl Button Capital of the World because of the numerous firms that produced the buttons there through the 1960s. The Peerless Button Company was established by James McKee and his brother-in-law William Bliven in 1895. Two years later the company's name was changed to the McKee and Bliven Button Company. They built this building in 1907. The company has been known as the McKee Button Company since 1925. The building was listed on the National Register of Historic Places in 2020 and was purchased by Kent Corporation of Muscatine, Iowa.

In March of 2022, Kent Corporation announced that they would begin transforming the McKee building into offices while focusing on preserving the building's history. The renovation was completed in June of 2025, and the building is currently a functioning office space.
