= Grossheim =

Grossheim or Großheim is a German-language surname. Notable people with the surname include:

- Alexander Alfonsovich Grossheim, Russian botanist
- Karl von Großheim, German architect and President of the Prussian Academy of Arts
- Oscar Grossheim, American photographer
