= Kent Nutrition Group =

Animal nutrition company

- Company type: Private
- Industry: Agriculture, Livestock and Pet nutrition
- Founded: 2010
- Headquarters: Muscatine, Iowa, US
- Area served: United States
- Key people: Gage Anthony Kent (owner); Mike Gauss (president)
- Products: Animal feed; Pet food; Lawn and garden
- Owner: Gage Anthony Kent, via Kent Corporation
- Number of employees: 2,000
- Parent: Kent Corporation
- Divisions: Kent; Blue Seal
- Website: kentnutritiongroup.com

The Kent Nutrition Group is an Iowa family owned corporation the production of animal feed based in Muscatine, Iowa. It operates under the brands Kent and Blue Seal. It is a subsidiary of the Kent Corporation, which is involved in corn wet-milling and the manufacture of food, beverage, and pharmaceutical products.

== History ==
Kent Nutrition Group was founded in 2010 in a corporate consolidation of two separate regional nutrition companies — Kent which had been established in 1927 and Blue Seal established in 1868 — under the Kent Corporation. The original president, Rich Dwyer, led the feed division for its first year of operations and in 2011, John Thorpe become the president of Kent Nutrition Group.

In 2016, Kent Nutrition Group acquired Deluxe Feeds, another Iowa-based feed company. The assets in the deal included Deluxe Feeds' retail stores, feed mills, and its Midwest EnRG Flakes operations. In June 2017, the company announced a $37-million expansion of the Deluxe Feeds plant in Sheldon, Iowa. It broke ground on the expansion in September 2017. The following month, the Kent Nutrition Group opened a new swine research facility at their 800-acre Product Development Center in Muscatine County.

In 2019, Mike Gauss was appointed as President, replacing John Thorpe who became President and COO of Kent’s parent company, Kent Corporation.

In 2022, Kent Grain Processing Corporation bought Natural Products, Inc. in Grinnell.

== Brands ==
=== Kent ===
Kent Feeds was founded by Gage A. Kent in Indianola, Iowa in 1927, where he used a mill to manufacture cattle feed. The company's first product, "Kent Baby Beef," was marketed as a cattle feed with high protein and no filler. A fire destroyed the original mill in Indianola and eventually Kent moved the company to a new plant in Muscatine, Iowa. In 1952, the company built a new plant in Muscatine. Between 1946 and 1964, Kent grew by 700%.

In 1988, Varied Investments (which would later become Muscatine Foods and, eventually, Kent Corporation) acquired H.K. Webster Company of Lawrence, Massachusetts, renaming it Blue Seal Feeds. At that time, both Kent Feeds and Blue Seal Feeds were operating as subsidiaries of Varied Investments. In 2001, Kent Feeds president Jack May resigned and was replaced by Gage A. Kent, the grandson of the company's founder. Kent sells commercial animal and show feeds primarily in the Midwest and nearby regions.

=== Blue Seal ===
Blue Seal Feeds was founded as the H. K. Webster Company in 1868 in Lawrence, Massachusetts by Henry K. Webster. Webster had rented a small gristmill to produce animal feed and grain products. His son Dean K. Webster began selling products under the "Blue Seal" brand name. In 1941, H.K. Webster Company expanded by acquiring a Quaker Oats plant in Richford, Vermont. By 1954, the company was earning $15 million in annual revenue and Ralph Kingman Webster, H.K. Webster's great-grandson, joined the company.

By 1988, the firm had grown to eight plants and seventeen retail stores in New England producing $150 million in annual revenue. That year, Varied Investments (which would later become Muscatine Foods and, eventually, the Kent Corporation) acquired the H.K. Webster Company and officially renamed it "Blue Seal Feeds." Blue Seal moved its headquarters to a new facility in Londonderry, New Hampshire, in 1994. In 2008, the company acquired the I.L. Richer Company, another feed company based in New York.

Blue Seal produces a number of branded items, including pet foods and animal feed as well as a line of lawn and garden products. Blue Seal products are primarily sold in the Northeast and along the Eastern Seaboard. Blue Seal also operates several retail stores in New England.
