= Oscar Grossheim =

American photographer

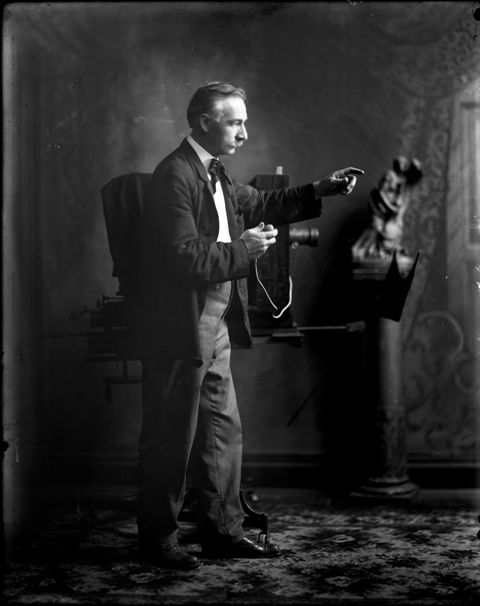
- Born: April 3, 1862; Muscatine, IA, U.S.
- Died: November 2, 1954 (aged 92); Muscatine, IA, U.S.
- Resting place: Buried at Greenwood Cemetery
- Occupation: Photographer
- Known for: Portraiture & Documentary Photography, Founder of Grossheim Studio
- Parent(s): Theodore Grossheim & Bertha Kirschbein

Oscar Grossheim (April 3, 1862 - November 2, 1954) was an American photographer known for his portraiture and documentary photographs of the pearl button industry, store displays and local life along the Upper Mississippi River Valley.

== Early life ==
Oscar Grossheim was born 3 April 1862, in Muscatine, Iowa. His parents, Theodore and Bertha Grossheim, emigrated to Muscatine from Berlin, Kingdom of Prussia in 1860 along with their eldest son, Alexander.

On October 16, 1884, Grossheim married his first wife, Anna McCart. After her death, he married Bertha Oberman on June 8, 1892. Grossheim had two daughters and a son, who died in infancy.

== Career ==
As a young boy, Grossheim was apprenticed to an area photographer, J.G. Evans, who used the wet plate collodion process to produce glass plate negatives.

In 1887, with his older brother Alexander, Oscar opened what would later become Berlin Studio, a photography studio, located at 117-119 East 2nd St. in Muscatine, Iowa. In 1892, the brothers parted ways and Oscar opened his own studio at 309 East 2nd St., where he worked until 1898. That same year, he built his permanent studio building at 317 E. 2nd St., and remained there until his retirement in May 1954.

Grossheim's body of work, which consists of approximately 55,000 glass plate negatives, is maintained by Musser Public Library in Muscatine, IA. The library has digitized and made available online over 4,000 images which can be viewed on the Upper Mississippi Valley Digital Image Archive.

The subject matter of Grossheim's work includes individual portrait studio sessions, group photos, documentation of the area's pearl button industry, and storefront displays.

Grossheim met George Eastman, co-founder of Eastman Kodak Co., at a convention of the members of the Photographers' Association of America (later changed to the Professional Photographers of America) in the 1880s, in Minneapolis, MN. Mr. Grossheim and Mr. Eastman discussed a prototype of the portable camera and visited one another in their respective places of business.
