= Muscatine Mall =

Shopping mall in Iowa, U.S.

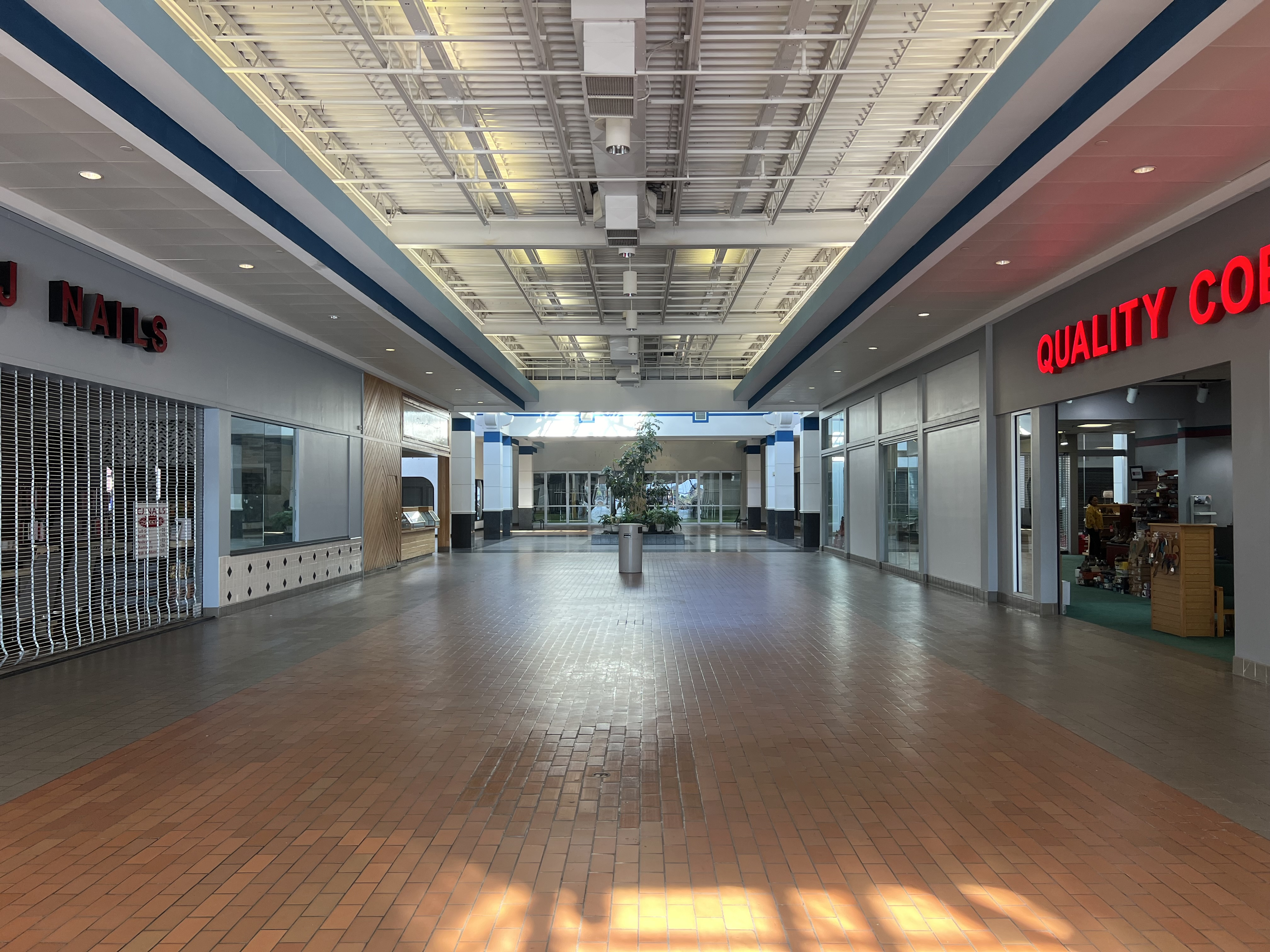
- The western entrance in 2024, facing center court and the Lab
- Location: Muscatine, Iowa, U.S.
- Coordinates: 41°26′48″N 91°01′42″W
- Address: 1903 Park Avenue
- Opened: August 5, 1971; 55 years ago
- Previous names: Muscatine Plaza
- Developer: General Growth Properties
- Manager: Muscatine Mall Management, LLC
- Num. of stores: 50+ (at peak)
- Num. of anchor tenants: 3
- Floor area: 345,000 sq ft (32,100 m^{2})
- Floors: 1

Muscatine Mall, originally Muscatine Plaza, is a shopping mall in Muscatine, Iowa, United States. Its anchor stores are the Lab, Slumberland Furniture, and Warehouse Bargains. Built in 1971 by General Growth Properties (now GGP, a Brookfield Properties subsidiary), the mall originally featured Woolworth and Montgomery Ward as its anchor stores, with JCPenney joining in 1975. Woolworth was converted to Woolco, which closed in 1983 and became the first Walmart in the state of Iowa. After Walmart moved to a larger store, their space became Menards, which also relocated and was replaced by Slumberland Furniture. Montgomery Ward became Von Maur, Staples, Elder-Beerman, Younkers, and Compton's Furniture & More before becoming Warehouse Bargains. The mall has undergone a number of periods of decline, owing to relocation and closure of charter tenants. It is owned and managed by Muscatine Mall Management, LLC.

== History ==
General Management (later General Growth Properties, now Brookfield Properties), a shopping mall developer then based out of Des Moines, Iowa, announced plans for Muscatine Plaza in March 1970. The company's plans called for an approximately 287,000-square-foot (26,700 m^{2}) enclosed shopping mall on Park Avenue (then part of US 61) on the north side of Muscatine, Iowa. In a meeting held at the city's Rotary International club, General Management leasing agent Jon E. Batesole stated that the mall would be an enclosed property with Montgomery Ward and Woolworth as the anchor stores. Other tenants confirmed at this point were Walgreens, a Hy-Vee supermarket, and a movie theater. Groundbreaking began on May 17, 1970.

Montgomery Ward was the first store to open, doing so on November 27, 1970. The location replaced a catalog store in downtown Muscatine, which itself replaced an older department store dating from the 1920s. The 55,000-square-foot (5,100 m^{2}) Montgomery Ward included automotive repair bays and a restaurant. Woolworth opened on the north side of the mall in June 1971. Their 72,000-square-foot (6,700 m^{2}) store was the chain's largest among stores which did not have more than one level. The mall itself consisted of a 36-foot (11 m) wide and 663-foot (202 m) long hallway connecting the two anchor stores. Opening-day ceremonies on August 5, 1971, included a ribbon-cutting ceremony hosted by the city's mayor, along with pony rides and a vintage car show. Tenants within the mall on opening day included Baskin-Robbins, Kinney Shoes, and Karmelkorn, with Pizza Hut, Maurices, and Musicland opening soon afterward.

=== 1970s and 1980s: Anchor changes after opening ===
In September 1972, the mall held a first-anniversary celebration which included drawings for over $600 in prizes from mall merchants. At the time, the mall had 27 stores. On the impact of the mall to the community, Larry Froschheuser of the city's chamber of commerce stated in the Muscatine Journal in July 1973 that he considered even larger shopping centers under development in the Quad Cities to be competition as well, but thought the city had the potential to maintain both a mall and businesses downtown. Salkin & Linoff, a clothing company based in Minnesota, opened Morrey A and Bostwick's for Men clothing stores at the mall in 1974, in addition to remodeling their Stevensons clothing store. In 1975, JCPenney added a 48,000-square-foot (4,500 m^{2}) onto the mall's east side, becoming its third anchor store. Like Montgomery Ward, this also replaced a store in Muscatine that had been operational since the 1920s. At the time of JCPenney's addition, the complex had begun to be referred to as Muscatine Mall.

Montgomery Ward announced the closure of the Muscatine Mall store in September 1978, as the company thought the store was too small to offer a full line of merchandise. In August 1979, the former location of Montgomery Ward became the eighth location of Davenport, Iowa-based Petersen Harned Von Maur (now just Von Maur). Von Maur completely remodeled the interior of the former Montgomery Ward, in addition to demolishing the former location of the automotive repair center. Renovations to Muscatine Mall between late 1979 and early 1980 added bricks to the main walkways, as well as new lighting, planters, and a mirrored ceiling over the central court. Additionally, Hy-Vee relocated to a larger store on the periphery. General Growth Properties sold off Muscatine Mall and nine other malls under its ownership in February 1980 to pay off a number of mortgages. All ten were sold to Aetna Life Insurance, which hired the Rouse Company as manager.

=== 1980s–early 1990s: Addition of Walmart and further changes ===
Woolworth converted its store at the mall to Woolco in mid-1981. A year and a half later, the company announced that it would close all Woolco stores by the beginning of 1983, due to the division having been unprofitable. After Woolco closed, its former location at Muscatine Mall underwent conversion to Walmart. The company chose to locate in Muscatine due to the city having a lower unemployment rate than the Quad Cities. Walmart opened on July 1, 1983. The store was not only the company's first in Iowa, but also their northernmost at the time, which resulted in the company referring to the location as their "Yankee" store. Coinciding with the opening of Walmart, the former location of Hy-Vee in the mall was subdivided for a new northwestern mall entrance and several smaller tenants, with this expansion opening in August 1983. Among the tenants was Kimberly Smorgasbord, a buffet restaurant which also had two locations in the Quad Cities. The restaurant was later renamed Liberty Smorgasbord before closing in 1987. That same year, the former locations of it and Maurices were combined to create a space for Spurgeon's, a Chicago-based department store which had operated a branch in Muscatine since 1929. Mark Lander, who managed the mall at the time, noted that the mall had begun attracting more chains in the late 1980s as he thought the previous tenant mix was "middle of the road". Among the tenants that had opened by the end of the decade were County Seat and regional clothing chain Seifert's. Maurices also returned to the mall, and restaurants Subway and Diamond Dave's both opened. In addition, both Walgreens and JCPenney remodeled their stores, while plans were announced to renovate mall concourses. Also in 1989, Aetna sold its interests in the malls for which it had previously hired Rouse as manager, leaving Rouse as the sole owner of Muscatine Mall and five others in Iowa.

By 1990, Muscatine Mall was 345,000 square feet (32,100 m^{2}) in size and had a capacity of about 50 stores. At the time of the mall's 20th year in operations in 1991, the marketing manager noted an increase in mall traffic and quality of tenants following the opening of Von Maur. She thought the presence of that store showed the mall had moved "upscale". Additionally, concourses had been remodeled with new floors and ceilings, as well as the addition of skylights and planters. Despite these improvements, a number of tenants began closing in the early-mid 1990s. First among these was Spurgeon's, which closed in 1992 due to the chain filing for bankruptcy. Walmart also announced in 1994 a plan to close the Muscatine Mall store in favor of a larger location; in response, Rouse officials began negotiations with home improvement chain Menards as a replacement for the Walmart store, as the two companies had previously done so with a vacated Walmart at the former Marshalltown Mall in Marshalltown, Iowa. Later that same year, Von Maur announced it would close the Muscatine Mall store, owing both to expiration of the store's lease and the chain's increasing move toward larger markets such as Chicago. In 1995, a telemarketing firm called APAC opened offices in the former location of Spurgeon's. Rouse underwent negotiations with Herberger's to replace Von Maur in 1995, but these plans were canceled in early 1996 for undisclosed reasons. Walmart completed its move out of Muscatine Mall to a larger store in June 1997. Soon afterward, Hy-Vee relocated a second time, vacating the store on the periphery of the mall. The vacancies of Walmart, Von Maur, and Hy-Vee caused a sharp decline in mall traffic, with occupancy of around 60 percent by 1998. In July of that year, Menards had opened in the former location of Walmart, a move which mall merchants thought would help revive tenancy.

=== Late 1990s–21st century: Attempted renovations and addition of Elder-Beerman ===
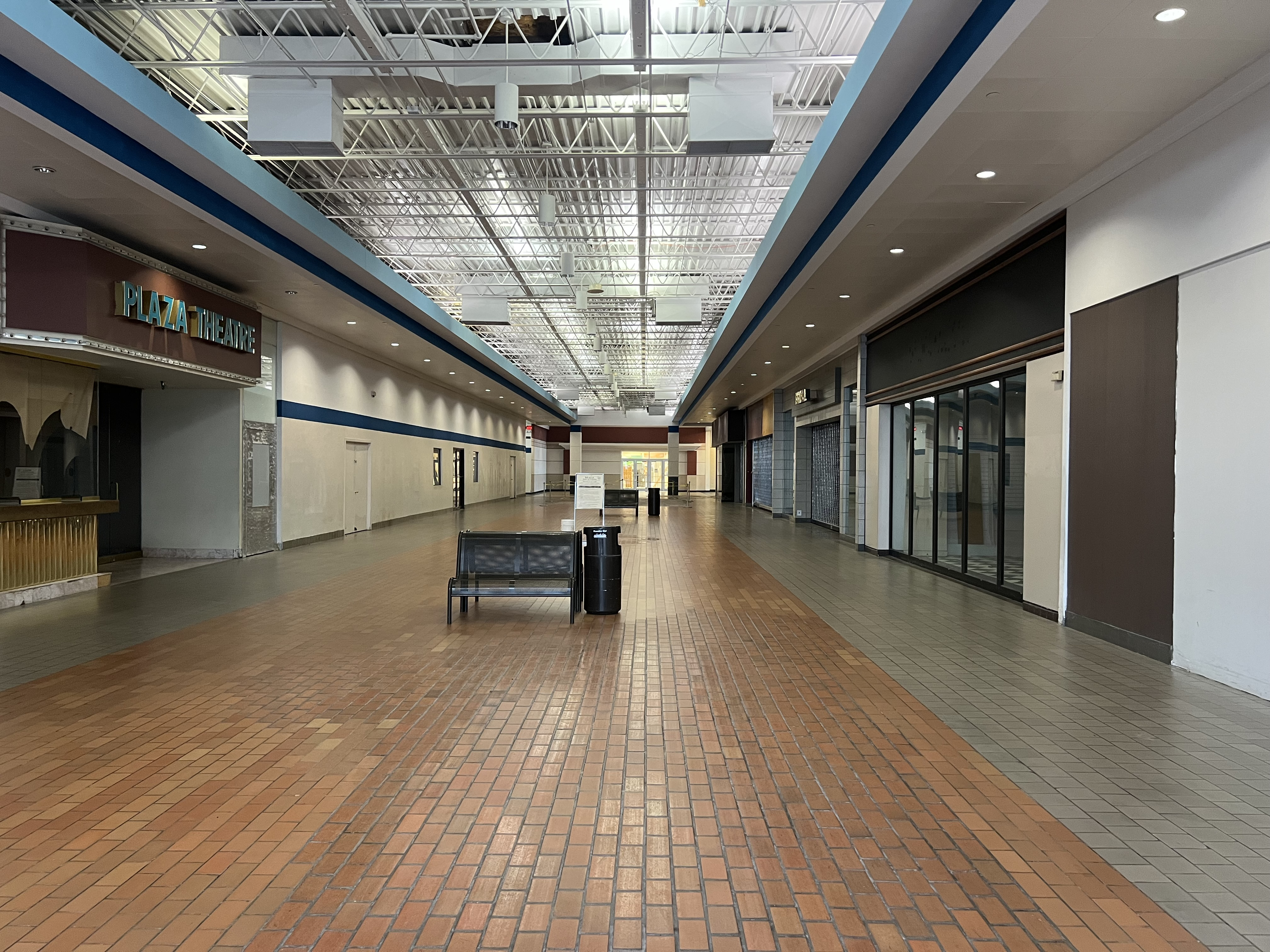
The mall's southern wing in 2024

Rouse sold all of its properties in Iowa to Landau & Heyman (later known as L&H) Real Estate, a Chicago-based firm, for an undisclosed amount in mid-1998. Staples confirmed in August 1999 that it would be opening a store at Muscatine Mall, occupying about 24,000 square feet (2,200 m^{2}) of the former Von Maur. The announcement of Staples coincided with a renovation project begun by Landau & Heyman that October, which intended to convert most of the property to a strip mall by removing most of the concourses and building new storefronts which faced Park Avenue. This plan was chosen as a means of increasing mall traffic, as the company thought the center would stay more competitive if it were no longer enclosed. By the time renovation had begun, other stores that had closed included B. Dalton, Payless ShoeSource, and the second location of Maurices.

Staples opened in April 2000. At the end of the year, Walgreens announced that it would be moving out of the mall to a newer store, to be built at the former location of the second Hy-Vee store. This was done as part of the chain's increasing focus on stand-alone stores with drive-through pharmacies. Staples closed in March 2002 due to poor sales; as a result, L&H's vice president stated that the plan to turn the complex into a strip mall was canceled, as the closure of Staples had created a lack of interest among potential new stores. Claire's, Hallmark Cards, and Musicland all closed between 2002 and 2003. Among the remaining tenants were JCPenney, Menards, the movie theater, Regis Corporation, GNC, and a number of local stores. Despite the increasing closures of inline stores, Elder-Beerman opened at Muscatine Mall in November 2003, taking both the former Staples and the rest of the former Von Maur. The store was Elder-Beerman's first west of the Mississippi River.

Menards submitted a site plan to the city of Muscatine in 2005 to relocate to a new store east of town. Despite the impending relocation of Menards, mall merchants reported increased sales and occupancy in 2006, which tenants attributed to a focus on local stores, and events such as car and motorcycle shows held within the concourses, as well as the selection of a new manager. Additionally, Quad Cities business developers Thad Denhartog, Scott Anderson, Kevin Koellner, and Rodney Blackwell formed the limited liability corporation Muscatine Mall Management, which purchased the property from L&H in July 2006. The new Menards opened on November 13, 2007, thus vacating the Muscatine Mall store. One year later, parent company Bon-Ton renamed the Elder-Beerman store at Muscatine Mall to Younkers, which it also owned at the time, as a means of consolidating the names of stores. In 2010, Slumberland Furniture opened at the former location of Menards. A Jimmy John's sandwich shop and Shoe Sensation footwear store also opened in the mall at this point. Fridley Theatres closed the cinema in the mall in 2013, in favor of a ten-screen complex elsewhere in Muscatine. JCPenney closed 33 "underperforming" stores in 2014, including the one at Muscatine Mall.

=== 2017–present: Closure of Younkers and subsequent changes ===
In March 2017, the manager discovered a news article circulating on Facebook claiming that the mall would close in two months. She refuted the claim after noting the article had come from a satirical website. Younkers closed in 2018 as part of a round of store closings enacted by the Bon-Ton, with many tenants reporting concerns over the mall's viability at this point. Compton's Furniture & More, a furniture store based out of Macon, Missouri, opened a location in the former Younkers in March 2019. By 2021, the space was converted again to Bargain World (since renamed Warehouse Bargains), a store which sells discount and overstock furniture and appliances. In 2022, the former location of JCPenney became the Lab, a facility created by the Muscatine High School's baseball coach to train players of baseball and softball. Quality Cobbler, the mall's longest-tenured inline tenant, planned to close in 2024 when its owners retired, but the business was sold to new owners and remains open.
