= Musser Lumber Company =

Musser Lumber Company was a US lumber company, and one of Iowa's pioneer lumber concerns. In its day, it was one of the most complete and modern lumber mills on the Mississippi River, employing about 400 men during the working season, and between 200 and 300 men in the logging end of the business.

== History ==
The Musser Lumber Company of Muscatine, Iowa, was incorporated in February, 1881, with a capital stock of $200,000. Peter Musser was elected president; Richard Musser, vice-president; P. M. Musser, secretary and treasurer; and C. R. Fox, yard and planing mill superintendent. This company was an outgrowth of the pioneer lumber firm of R. Musser & Company, which was established by Peter and Richard Musser and Edward Hoch in 1855. These gentlemen began by buying rafts of lumber in the river, which they yarded and sold by retail and wholesale. They also established a lumber yard at Iowa City in 1856, where Peter Musser resided, it being managed by that gentleman until he went to California, in April, 1864. Hoch continued in the firm for three years until 1858, when he retired, and the firm became R. Musser & Company. In 1864, P. M. Musser bought into the business, without any change of firm name; he assumed charge of the Iowa City yard, which he conducted until 1873, when he and John Porter purchased the interest of R. Musser & Company in the branch yard at Iowa City. They carried on under the firm name of Musser & Porter, with P. M. Musser still retaining his interest in the business in Muscatine. In 1870, having returned from California, Peter Musser joined his brother, Richard, together with C. R. Fox, a former employee, and P. M. Musser, in the organization of the firm of Musser & Company for the purpose of building and operating a saw mill and carrying on the lumber business at Muscatine. In the spring of 1871, they completed their mill at a point on the Mississippi River, since known as Musserville, which was included in the corporate limits of the city of Muscatine, and began the manufacture of lumber. The mill cut about 11,000,000 feet (3,400,000 m) of lumber a year. In 1873, Richard Musser retired from the business, selling his interest to P. M. Musser, and the firm became P. M. Musser & Company. Three years later, Richard Musser renewed his connection with the company, and the firm name of Musser & Company was again adopted.

In 1877, the company enlarged their mill, putting in improved machinery and increasing its capacity materially. Four years later, the proprietors decided to organize under an act of incorporation, which was done in February, 1881, under the name of the Musser Lumber Company, the incorporators being the original proprietors, R. Musser, P. Musser, P. M. Musser and C. R. Fox of Muscatine, and John Musser of Adamstown, Pennsylvania, and the officers elected being the same as given above. During the same year, the company rebuilt and enlarged the mill, which they fitted with the most modern and improved machinery, making it one of the most complete and capacious saw mills on the Mississippi River, with capacity for manufacturing 50,000,000 feet (15,000,000 m) of lumber, 12,000,000 feet (3,700,000 m) of lath and 12,000,000 feet (3,700,000 m) of shingles for the working season. The power was furnished by two engines, the combined force of which equaled 500 horse-power. In 1882, the company erected a planing mill, detached from the saw mill, which afforded facilities for dressing lumber and the manufacture of flooring, siding and boards. The business of this company was strictly wholesale, and their trade was principally located in the states of Iowa, Nebraska, Kansas, Missouri, Colorado and Dakota. The number of people employed at their mills and yards was about 300.

The Musser Lumber Company owned large tracts of pine lands along the Chippewa in Wisconsin and in the Minnesota lumber region; their logs were cut by contract and were rafted by the Chippewa Logging Company and the Mississippi River Logging Company, two large lumber corporations, of which the Musser Lumber Company was one of the incorporators,. For about 12 years, this company owned and operated its own rafting steamers, it having operated the “Silver Wave” and “Le Clare Belle" during all that time, and the steamer, “Musser,” for two years. All were sold during the season of 1888 to Capt. S. R. Van Sant. The company’s plant covered an area of thirty-five acres, and the yards were stocked according to the season of the year, in the amount of 8,000,000–25,000,000 feet (2,400,000–7,600,000 m) of lumber and a proportionate amount of lath and shingles. To convey an idea of the growth of the business from the date of its origin with the firm of Hoeh & Musser, it was reported that the amount of business done the first year was about US$100,000, while the 1898 annual business of the company exceeded $750,000. This corporation had its own system of water-works, which was established in 1872, and in which a Duplex pump and Cameron pump, was used. This company also had one of Barry’s Niagara rotary hydrants, which could throw a three-inch stream a distance of about 400 feet (120 m) and to a height of 200 feet (61 m), and thus the supply of water and force was equal to emergencies which might arise.

The Mussers were also the original incorporators of the Mississippi River Logging Company and Chippewa Lumber and Boom Company; they were also largely interested in the Musser-Sauntry Land, Logging and Manufacturing Company of Stillwater, Minnesota, among the largest pine land owners and logging companies in the world.

The aggregate cut of the mills at Muscatine was reported in 1875 at 38,000,000 feet, with 21,000,000 shingles; that of 1880 at 55,000,000 feet, with 18,000,000 shingles, while that of 1897 reached 110,000,000 feet of lumber, 30,000,000 shingles and 25,000,000 lath.

The Musser Lumber Company, one of Iowa's pioneer lumber concerns, closed up its business at Muscatine on November 28, 1916. Following a meeting of the directors of the lumber concern, it was decided to dissolve the company and formal announcement of the dissolution was made on that date by P. M. Musser, president and treasurer. The officers of the company up to the time of the dissolution were: P. M. Musser, president and treasurer; William Musser, vice-president, and R. Drew Musser, secretary.

== Bibliography ==
- Hotchkiss, George Woodward (1898). History of the Lumber and Forest Industry of the Northwest (Public domain ed.). G.W. Hotchkiss & Company.
- National Lumberman (1916). National Lumberman. Vol. LVIII, No. 12 (Public domain ed.). St. Louis, Missouri: National Lumberman.
