= Pearl button industry in Muscatine, Iowa =

American button manufacturing industry

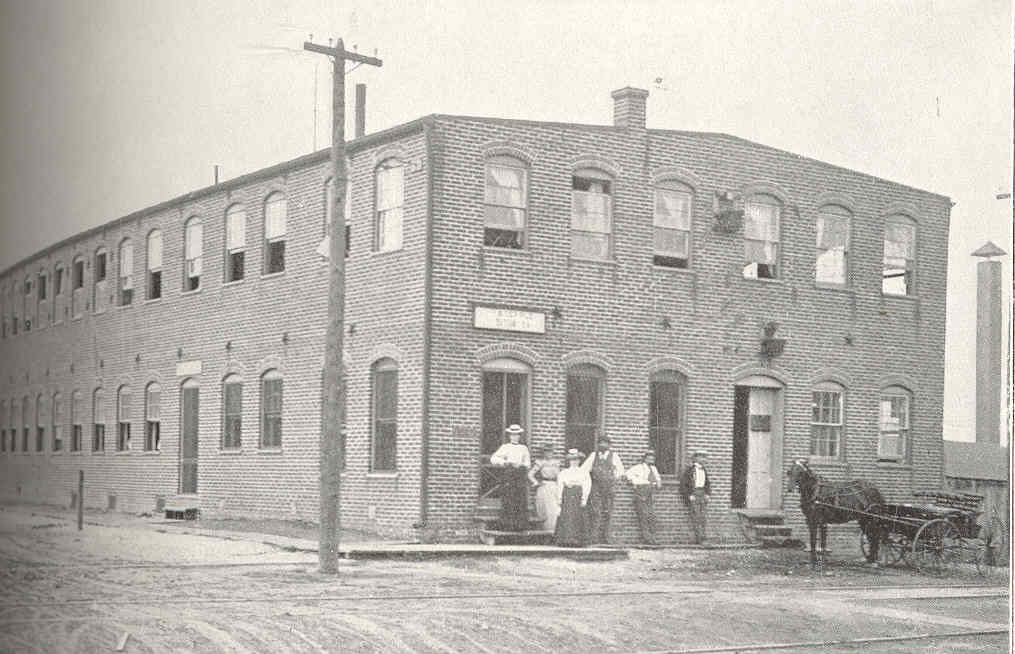
A pearl button factory in Muscatine in 1899

The pearl button industry in Muscatine, Iowa was a manufacturing industry that converted freshwater mussel shells from the Mississippi River watershed into mother-of-pearl buttons. Established in 1891 by the German button maker John F. Boepple, it was the first commercially successful American button industry based on freshwater shells. Muscatine became the principal American manufacturing and trading center for the product.

As the American ready-made clothing industry grew, the need for large numbers of inexpensive fasteners like pearl buttons increased. By 1898, Muscatine had five complete button factories and 28 shops dedicated purely to cutting blanks, and by 1911, there were at least 43 button-related facilities in the city, with more than half of Muscatine's 3,500 wage earners involved in the button industry. Production was typically divided by sex: men and boys sawed blanks, while women and girls operated finishing machines and sewed finished buttons to cards. Working conditions were poor, with long hours, unsafe machinery, contaminated workplaces, and frequent disputes over pay.

In February 1911, manufacturers closed almost every plant, citing overproduction and a lack of demand. As a result, members of the recently organized Button Workers Protective Union called the closure a lockout. The ensuing fifteen-month boycott and strike drew support from the American Federation of Labor and the Women's Trade Union League, divided the city, and brought strikebreakers and the Iowa National Guard to Muscatine. It ended in 1912 without a settlement or a clear victor.

Intensive harvesting fueled by button manufacturing depleted mussel beds near Muscatine within the industry's first decade and pushed shell buyers into more distant rivers, increasing costs. Manufacturers helped secure the establishment of the federal Fairport Biological Station near Muscatine in 1908 to study mussels and artificial propagation, but attempts to rebuild the commercial stock generally failed. During World War I, the industry experienced a mild resurgence, continuing through the 1920s. The Great Depression then marked the beginning of a prolonged decline, compounded by foreign competition, changing clothing fashions, resource scarcity, and the growing use of plastic buttons. Several Muscatine companies eventually converted to plastics, although limited shell-button production continued into the 1960s. In 1966, the Ronda Button Company, which was the last firm in Muscatine to produce pearl buttons, closed its doors.

== Background ==
American factories made mother-of-pearl buttons before the Muscatine industry, but they traditionally used imported ocean shells. From the mid-1850s to 1890, plants in cities including New York and Newark processed shells brought from Asia and the western Pacific. A short-lived plant at Knoxville, Tennessee, reportedly made buttons and novelties from native Tennessee River shells around 1883, but it closed after a few years. According to the federal biologist Robert E. Coker, the commercial development of the American freshwater-shell industry was primarily a result of John F. Boepple's work at Muscatine in 1891. Demand expanded with mass-produced shirts, women's blouses and washable dresses, children's clothing, underwear, and motoring coats. Tariffs enacted in 1890 and 1897 increased the use of domestically made buttons. By 1905 freshwater shells supplied two-thirds of the pearl buttons made in the United States, and pearl of all kinds accounted for almost half the country's domestic button production.

Muscatine was a Mississippi River city of 11,454 people in 1890. Lumber processing generally dominated its commerce, but the exhaustion of white-pine forests in Minnesota and Wisconsin threatened the future livelihoods of local sawmills. With an established industrial base, Muscatine already had an industrial workforce and river and rail connections, while the city's older lumber economy was contracting.

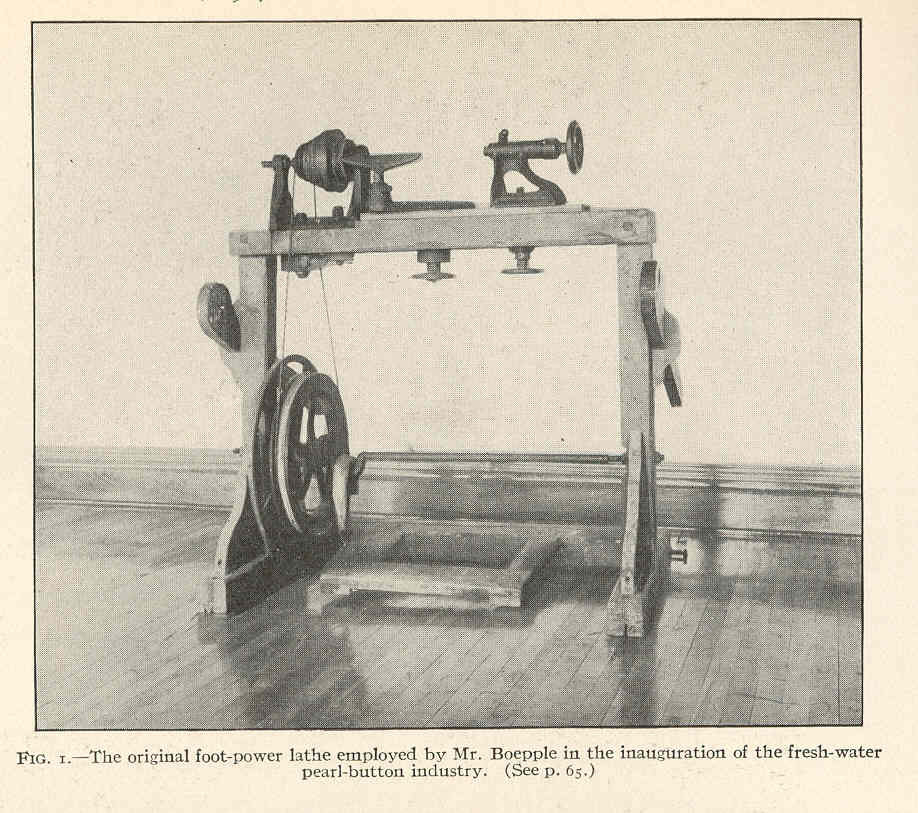
Boepple's original foot-powered button lathe, illustrated in a federal report

Boepple had trained as a button maker in Ottensen, Germany. He emigrated to the United States in 1887 and searched for freshwater shell suitable for button manufacturing before settling in Muscatine. He found that the river mussels there were thick enough to withstand cutting. With local financial backing, he opened a small factory in the city in 1891. The enterprise was initially unprofitable because the hard, irregular shells were difficult to form into buttons, but Boepple adapted the foot-powered lathes and tools he had used in Europe and continued production.

The simplicity of early button-manufacturing machinery allowed competitors to imitate Boepple's methods. As a result, Boepple did not retain control of the industry he founded; local entrepreneurs in Muscatine opened their own factories, and the industry developed specialized branches in mussel fishing, shell buying, blank cutting, button finishing, and machine manufacturing.

== Expansion ==
The early industry included complete factories, which took shells through all stages to finished buttons for market, and small saw works that only cut circular blanks. In July 1898, a federal investigation found 33 facilities active in Muscatine, five complete factories and 28 blank-cutting shops. The same investigation recorded rapid new investment elsewhere in Iowa and Illinois and found that Muscatine blank makers also tended to supply blanks to established ocean-shell factories in the eastern United States. By 1908 Muscatine had twelve complete plants and ten blank works; the number of blank firms rose again to 25 in 1910. Counts during this period vary because some sources distinguish complete factories from blank works while others combine button-related establishments. Generally, it is accepted that there were 43 plants at the beginning of the 1911 labor conflict.

An 1899 local industry account described the Boepple Button Company as the largest manufacturer and the Peerless Button Company, founded by James McKee and William Bliven, as the second; the New York Button Company and Leo H. Hirsch & Co. represented eastern interests that operated facilities in Muscatine. Fewer than half of the other firms profiled in that account survived into the next decade. John Weber and Henry Umlandt formed Automatic Pearl Works in 1898; after Weber left in 1903, Umlandt reorganized it as the Automatic Button Company.

The federal census covering 1909 found 43 of Iowa's 70 button facilities in Muscatine. Statewide, 3,376 people were engaged in the industry, including an average 3,172 wage earners; the census valued its output at $4.035 million and its wage bill at $1.412 million. In Muscatine, button workers made up more than half of its 3,500 wage earners. Rural young people boarded in town to work, and many residents spent most of their working lives in one plant.

Coker recorded national freshwater-button production in millions of gross: 4.3 million gross in 1899, 11.4 million in 1904, and an estimated 30 million in 1909. Muscatine's piece-rate system used a separate counting convention under which some workers were required to produce 168 pieces for a paid gross rather than the usual 144.

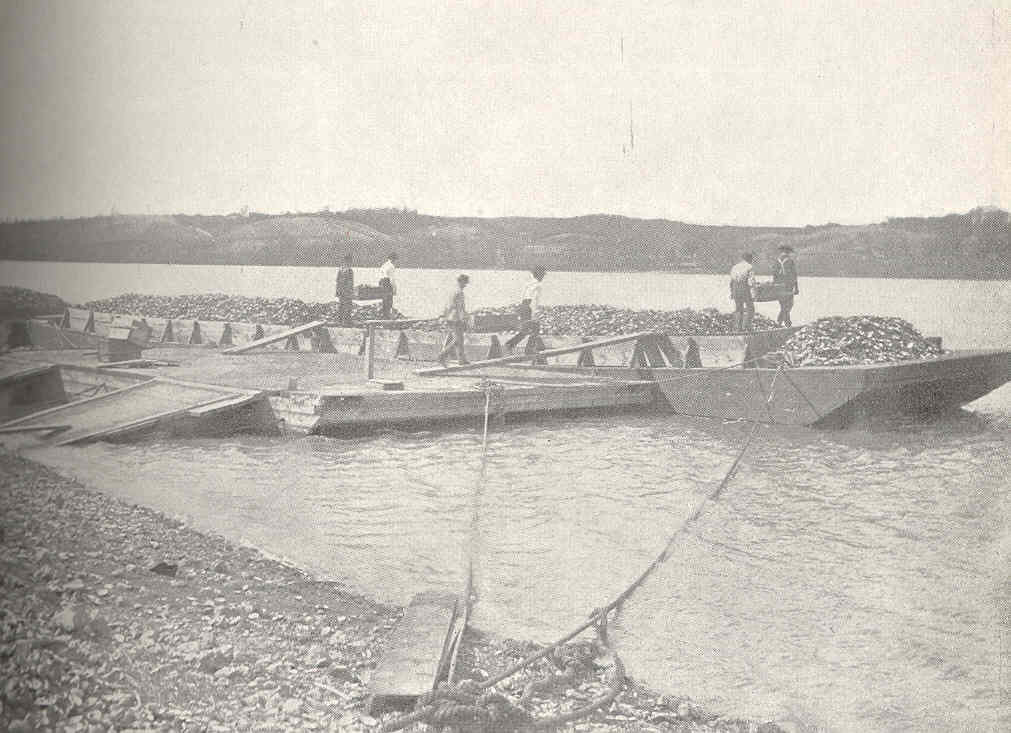
Mussel shells being loaded at Le Claire, Iowa, for shipment to Muscatine, 1899

At first factories drew directly on beds near the city. As nearby catches declined due to overfishing, shells and blanks began to be imported from other states. Shells were already arriving from Missouri and Illinois by 1898, and by about 1910 sources reached as far as Alabama and eastern Kentucky. Cutting shops near the beds often removed blanks before shipment, avoiding the cost of carrying the large part of each shell that could not become a button. Finished or unfinished material then moved by river and rail to Muscatine.

Muscatine machine shops built and repaired saws, drills, finishing machines, and harvesting equipment for the button and mussel trades. The Barry Manufacturing Company abandoned its earlier plumbing and heating products to specialize in button machinery. A federal investigator reported in 1898 that some large shops devoted almost all their work to the button and mussel trades, which could yield substantially higher margins than the cost of constructing the equipment.

== Labor ==
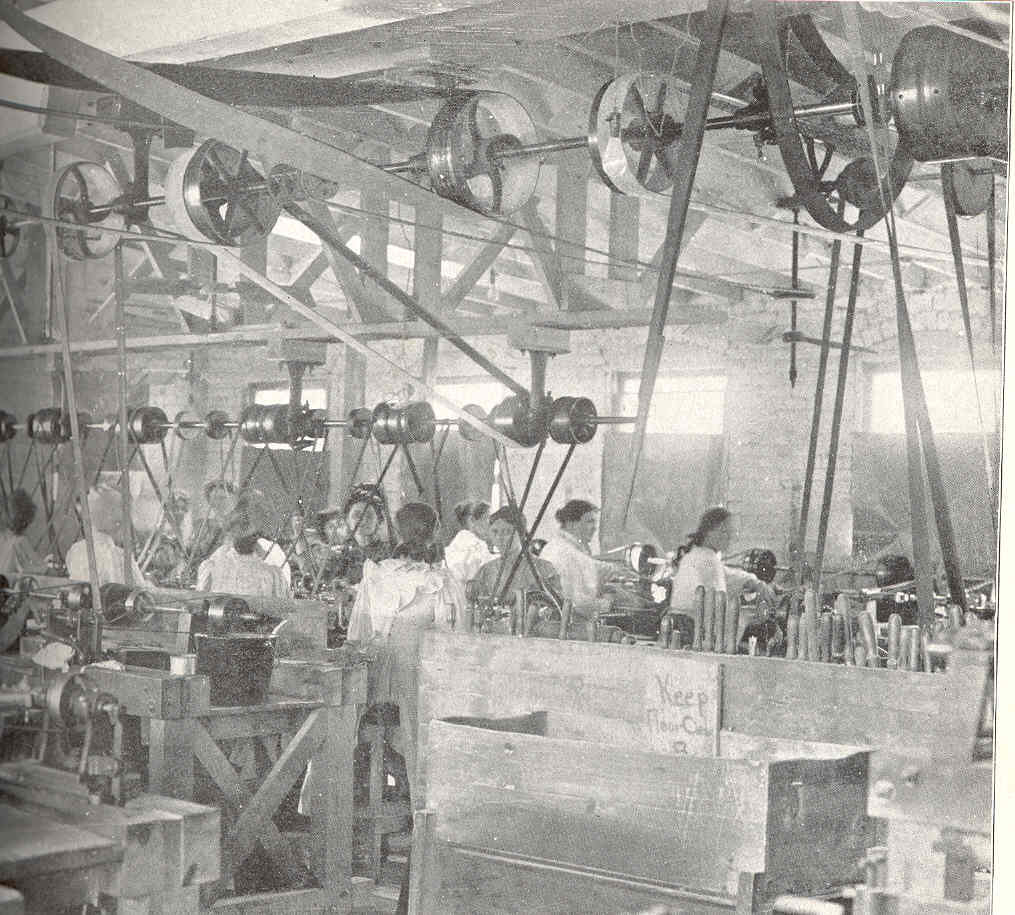
Women operating button-drilling machines in a Muscatine factory, 1899

Factory work was sharply divided by sex. Men and adolescent boys generally cut blanks and ground, polished, or dyed buttons, while women and adolescent girls faced and drilled blanks, sorted finished buttons, packed them, and sewed them onto cards. The industry ranked fourth among Iowa manufacturing industries in its number of women employees.

Except for shell sorters, most workers were paid by the piece. In Muscatine's piece-rate system, a factory "gross" could be counted as 14 dozen, or 168 pieces, instead of the traditional 12 dozen (144 pieces) per gross. The additional 24 were intended to cover defective pieces. Workers argued that this made them supply the expected rejects without pay, and suspicions that managers manipulated weights and counts were common. Carders, many of whom worked at home, were paid by the gross for sewing buttons onto cards.

The historian Rebecca Meints found that in 1898 blank cutters generally received 5 to 10 cents per gross and could complete about 100 to 150 gross in a week. Facers and drillers earned approximately $4 to $7 a week, and carders $4 to $5. By 1909 the reported average for cutters was about $9, with skilled cutters making $15 to $18, while women's factory earnings generally remained between $3 and $6.

Census figures cited by Jane Farrel-Beck and Meints placed 2,868 of 3,172 industry workers on schedules of 54 to 60 hours a week in 1910, with some working as many as 72 hours. Shell dust from sawing and grinding irritated the respiratory tracts of workers, and exhaust systems and wet cutting intended to eliminate exposure only mildly improved conditions. The historians reported that occupational mortality tables for 1900–06 classified about 38 percent of deaths among male button workers as "consumption", compared with about 15 percent among men in the general population. Cutters also reached into vats in which shell remnants decomposed, risking infected wounds, while unguarded drilling and pressing machinery caused frequent hand injuries.

A 1902 Iowa statute required guards on specified machinery, prohibited workers under sixteen and girls under eighteen from cleaning machinery in motion, and required exhaust equipment for some dust-producing processes. A separate 1906 child-labor law established a general minimum age of fourteen for employment in factories and workshops. Still, enforcement remained uneven, and Iowa had no general wage or hours law for women in 1911. During the 1911 labor conflict, workers also complained of being required to clean moving machinery and alleged sexual coercion by managers.

== Button workers' conflict of 1911–12 ==
Earlier attempts to organize button workers in 1897 and 1903 had dissolved without any lasting change. A new Button Workers Protective Union began in November 1910 with nine men and 29 women. Its membership exceeded 1,000 by late January 1911 and eventually approached 2,500, leaving only a few hundred button workers outside of the union. No citywide bargaining agreement existed. Manufacturers feared the union's growth and possible wage demands.

On February 25, 1911, the large factories and all but one of the small plants announced an indefinite shutdown, laying off roughly 2,500 people. Manufacturers said an eastern depression and overproduction had made a closure necessary. The union disagreed, calling the action a premeditated lockout intended to make workers surrender their membership cards, pointing to continued work outside of Muscatine and offers from manufacturers to rehire non-union labor. Production resumed on a reduced basis within a month, but the union maintained a boycott.

To return to work, the union demanded non-discrimination in hiring and pay, a joint committee to negotiate disputes, the right of women workers to watch their output being weighed, and reinstatement of all workers previously laid off. National organizations supplied organizers and money. The American Federation of Labor (AFL) sent its organizer Emmet Flood, and the Women's Trade Union League sent four women to help organize relief and women members. Locally, the union held mass and factory meetings, issued bulletins, ran a communal kitchen, and distributed scrip accepted by supportive grocers.

Women served on the executive committee, led pickets and marches, represented the union to the Chicago AFL, and organized housing, clothing, and food. Workers also formed a Juvenile Button Sewers' and Carriers' Union for about 700 children who had carded or carried buttons. Teenage button worker Pearl McGill, the union's recording secretary, became a traveling fundraiser for the strike, speaking to labor audiences in St. Louis, New York City, Boston, and other cities. She later joined the Industrial Workers of the World and organized during the 1912 Lawrence textile strike.

The dispute also entered city politics. Two Socialist candidates won seats as aldermen in the March 6 election, the first Socialists elected to municipal office in Muscatine; one, O. C. Wilson, served for much of his term as the button union's business agent. Contemporary reporting attributed much of the vote to button workers, but the union did not formally align itself with the Socialist Party.

After some plants reopened with non-union workers, crowds harassed strikebreakers, and unionists were arrested. On April 13 the sheriff brought 25 private deputies from Chicago and St. Louis into the city. The deputies enforced a ban on assemblies of more than three people. Unionists and other residents opposed the restriction, and a riot followed. On April 14 three National Guard companies entered Muscatine and imposed martial law for four days. The Guard returned during renewed disorder that autumn.

Two proposed settlements failed in the spring of 1911. The union considered their conditions to be vague and accused factories of dismissing members and cutting wages. Employers refused collective recognition and accused the union of breaking agreements. National unions eventually contributed more than $57,000, including $21,500 from the AFL. Local support declined as unemployment continued. The boycott ended in the spring of 1912 without either side claiming victory, and the union ceased to function effectively.

In the strike's final months, a commission of the Federal Council of the Churches of Christ investigated conditions. Its recommendations included state inquiries into counting and weighing, shell-related disease, night and home work, and the conduct of imported deputies, as well as creation of a state industrial commission. The inquiry did not secure a settlement.

== Depletion and conservation ==
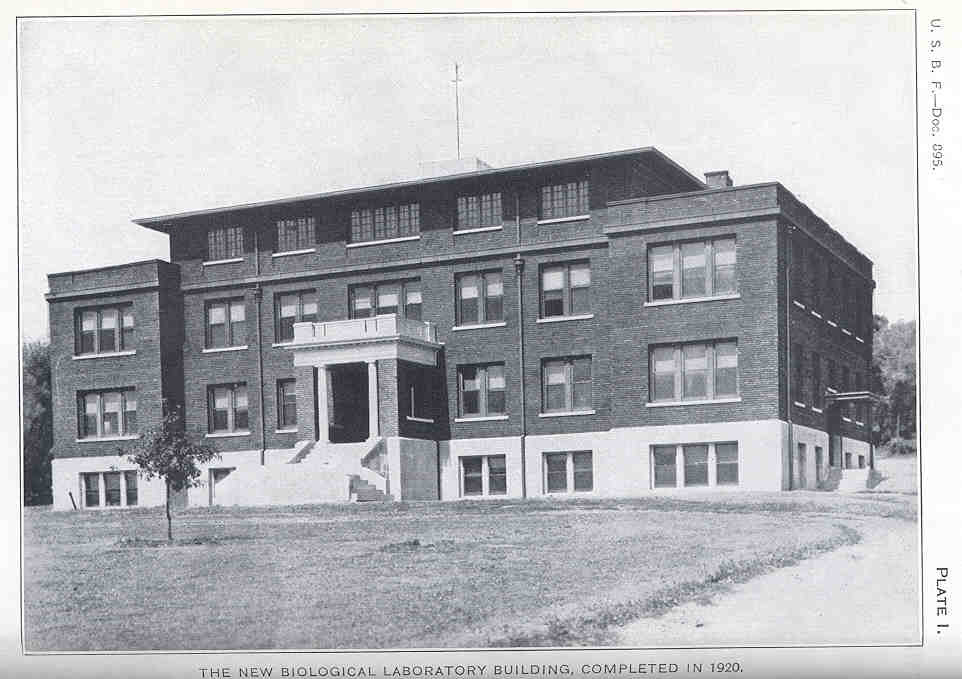
The new laboratory building at the Fairport Biological Station, completed in 1920

As beds near Muscatine were depleted, shell buyers began to expand into other rivers. Hugh Smith's 1898 field survey, conducted seven years after commercial manufacture began in Muscatine, described smaller catches, use of undersized shells, and imports from other states. A heavily worked bed directly in front of Muscatine had initially produced about 500 tons in 1896 but could not sustain even one season at that rate. Discarding opened mussels back into the water could also injure or kill them, while sewage and industrial waste reduced habitat quality in the area. Smith recommended minimum sizes, a closed season, limits on interstate shipment of raw shell, better use of each valve, and pollution controls, but no changes were made as a result.

Congress authorized the Fairport Biological Station in 1908, eight miles upriver from Muscatine. Local manufacturers bought 60 acres for the station and transferred the site to the federal government. Construction began late in 1909, mussel investigations started in June 1910, and practical propagation followed in 1912. The main laboratory formally opened in 1914. Boepple joined the staff as a shell expert in 1910 and worked there until his death in 1912.

In 1913–14, Muscatine manufacturers held most of the principal offices of the National Association of Pearl Button Manufacturers. The association worked with the federal biologist Robert E. Coker on proposals to close sections of rivers for several years, prohibit the taking of small mussels, secure supporting state legislation, and fund further propagation work at Fairport. The association also lobbied to maintain protective button tariffs.

Fairport scientists developed practical propagation techniques. Sectional closures at Lake Pepin produced a temporary recovery after 1919, but catches fell rapidly again after protected areas reopened. River engineering created an additional reproductive barrier. The Keokuk hydroelectric dam, completed in 1913, blocked the upstream migration of skipjack herring. By the mid-1920s that fish was largely absent above the dam. The commercially valuable ebonyshell mussel depended on skipjack as its host, so its larvae could no longer complete their life cycle in much of the upper river. By 1930 Fairport researchers were also emphasizing silt, pollution and channel alteration. Eventually, federal mussel work at Fairport was wound down in the early 1930s as the station shifted toward fish culture due to the decline of the mussel industry.

== Wartime era ==
Industrial output continued to grow while manufacturers drew shells and blanks from waters further and further from Muscatine. By 1914, Iowa produced 46 percent by value of the country's freshwater pearl buttons, and contemporary accounts called Muscatine the "Pearl Button Capital of the World". World War I then disrupted European button production and increased demand for American manufacturers. By this time, many women's garments used fewer small buttons, closed with hooks or other devices, or adopted larger fasteners made from metal, ceramic, leather, cloth, and early plastics. The zipper provided another alternative to the button after 1930. Still, small shell buttons remained in use for men's shirts and lingerie. In 1916 Muscatine's city directory listed ten complete button manufacturers and a record 43 blank-cutting firms, while United States freshwater-button output exceeded 40 million gross. The local trade continued through the 1920s.

Japanese manufacturers combined lower labor costs with increasingly mechanized production and expanded sales in the United States. The Fordney–McCumber Tariff raised duties on pearl and shell buttons in September 1922, following the industry's campaign for protection. American freshwater-button factories were reported at roughly 40 percent of capacity in 1921 and about 50 percent by the end of 1922. Eleven complete manufacturers appeared in Muscatine's 1921 directory.

== Decline ==
The Great Depression brought plant closures and slowed production, while plastics offered a uniform raw material that did not depend on volatile river harvests. A 1932 federal study found ten of the country's sixteen mussel-shell button plants in Iowa, mostly in Muscatine, and estimated that Iowa produced 69 percent of the national output. Muscatine firms experimented with composition and plastic buttons during the 1930s, and several later converted to plastic production. Nationally, plastic-button production had overtaken pearl-button production by 1939. A new button workers' union secured recognition and improved conditions after a large 1933 strike, but home carding remained widespread outside the factories.

A joint Women's Bureau and Children's Bureau investigation interviewed 100 Muscatine families in 1934 and described button carding as an established home process of more than forty years. Seven finishing plants remained in the city; six distributed at least some carding to homes, with one using about 600 home workers at peak season. The study found that work often arrived late in the day and was due back the next morning. Among the carders whose earnings were measured, 78 percent earned less than 10 cents an hour, even after federally approved piece-rate increases, and none reached 20 cents. Children also assisted despite signed promises that those under sixteen would not work.

Federal figures recorded 17.1 million gross of freshwater buttons in 1937, made from about 27,000 tons of shell. A 1946 industry survey estimated that nearly 2,000 people still worked in Muscatine's pearl-button industry and that the city accounted for about 65 percent of United States production. After World War II, newer plastics were cheaper and tougher. New detergents commonly used in most households could yellow shell buttons, while heat in automatic washers and dryers could separate layers of shell. Still, several Muscatine companies expanded plastic lines while continuing pearl-button production.

Shell buttons persisted as a niche product into the 1960s. At the same time, Mississippi watershed shells found a new market: after about 1950 processors cut them into spherical nuclei for the Japanese cultured pearl industry. Commercial musseling continued for the cultured pearl trade, while Muscatine's mass production of shell clothing buttons continued to decline. The Ronda Button Company, the last Muscatine firm still producing pearl-button blanks and some pearl buttons, ended that production in 1966.

== Bibliography ==
- Claassen, Cheryl (1994). "Washboards, Pigtoes, and Muckets: Historic Musseling in the Mississippi Watershed—Introduction". Historical Archaeology. 28 (2): 1. doi:10.1007/BF03377143. JSTOR 25616309.
- Coker, Robert E. (1916). "The Fairport Fisheries Biological Station: Its Equipment, Organization, and Functions" (PDF). Bulletin of the United States Bureau of Fisheries. 34: 383–405. Archived (PDF) from the original on March 23, 2025.
- Coker, Robert E. (1919). Fresh-Water Mussels and Mussel Industries of the United States (Report). Bulletin of the Bureau of Fisheries. Vol. 36. Washington, D.C.: United States Bureau of Fisheries. pp. 13–89. doi:10.5962/bhl.title.43678. Archived from the original on December 5, 2025.
- Farrel-Beck, Jane A.; Meints, Rebecca Hatfield (1983). "The Role of Technology in the Fresh-Water Pearl Button Industry of Muscatine, Iowa, 1891–1910". The Annals of Iowa. 47 (1): 3–18. doi:10.17077/0003-4827.8959. Archived from the original on June 11, 2026.
- Hurd, Frances Schreurs (1966). "The Pearl Button Industry of Muscatine, Iowa". The Annals of Iowa. 38 (6): 401–411. doi:10.17077/0003-4827.7813. Archived from the original on January 16, 2025.
- Iowa Department of Natural Resources (n.d.). "History of the Fairport Hatchery". State of Iowa. Archived from the original on July 2, 2026.
- Iowa General Assembly (1902). Acts and Joint Resolutions Passed at the Regular Session of the Twenty-Ninth General Assembly of the State of Iowa (PDF) (Report). Des Moines: State of Iowa. Archived (PDF) from the original on February 2, 2023.
- Iowa General Assembly (1906). Acts and Resolutions Passed at the Regular Session of the Thirty-First General Assembly of the State of Iowa (PDF) (Report). Des Moines: State of Iowa. Archived (PDF) from the original on April 10, 2025.
- McCarley, Rebecca Lawin (2008). Historical and Architectural Resources of Muscatine, Iowa (PDF) (Report). National Register of Historic Places Multiple Property Documentation Form. National Park Service. Archived (PDF) from the original on June 29, 2024.
- McCarley, Rebecca Lawin (2020). McKee Button Company (PDF) (Report). National Register of Historic Places Registration Form. National Park Service.
- Meints, Rebecca Hatfield (1981). The Fresh-Water Pearl Button Industry in Muscatine, Iowa: 1890–1910 (PDF) (M.S. thesis). Iowa State University.
- Orr, Craig; Oswald, Alison (n.d.). "Preliminary Guide to the Iowa Button Industry Collection". Smithsonian Online Virtual Archives. National Museum of American History. NMAH.AC.0504. Archived from the original on December 9, 2025.
- Pritchard, James (December 21, 2001). An Historical Analysis of Mussel Propagation and Culture: Research Performed at the Fairport Biological Station (PDF) (Report). Clear Creek Historical Research. Contract DACW-25-01-M-0312.
- Pritchard, James (2005). "Threatened by Industry, Saved by Science: Mussel Propagation at the Fairport Biological Laboratory". Journal of the Iowa Academy of Science. 112 (3–4): 36–47. Archived from the original on December 12, 2025.
- Rousmaniere, Kate (1982). "The Muscatine Button Workers' Strike of 1911–12". The Annals of Iowa. 46 (4): 243–262. doi:10.17077/0003-4827.8857. Archived from the original on February 18, 2026.
- Rousmaniere, Kate (2009). "The Short, Radical Life of Pearl McGill". Labor: Studies in Working-Class History of the Americas. 6 (3): 9–19. doi:10.1215/15476715-2009-003.
- Skinner, Mary (1936). Industrial Home Work under the National Recovery Administration (Report). Children's Bureau Publication. Washington, D.C.: United States Department of Labor. Archived from the original on November 12, 2025.
- Smith, Hugh M. (1899). "The Mussel Fishery and Pearl-Button Industry of the Mississippi River". Bulletin of the United States Fish Commission. 18. United States Fish Commission: 289–314. Archived from the original on February 18, 2026.
- United States Bureau of the Census (1912). Thirteenth Census of the United States Taken in the Year 1910: Manufactures, 1909—Iowa (PDF) (Report). Bulletin 391. Washington, D.C.: Government Printing Office. Archived (PDF) from the original on August 23, 2026.
- United States Congress (1922). "Tariff Act of 1922". Washington, D.C.: Government Printing Office. Archived from the original on November 10, 2025.
- United States Department of Commerce (1916). Annual Report of the Secretary of Commerce for the Fiscal Year Ended June 30, 1916 (Report). Washington, D.C.: Government Printing Office. Archived from the original on July 6, 2022.
- University of Iowa Libraries (n.d.). "McGill family". ArchivesSpace at the University of Iowa. University of Iowa Libraries. Archived from the original on March 15, 2026.
