= W. R. Schoemaker =

American Baptist pastor

William Ross Schoemaker (September 4, 1863 – September 19, 1937) was an American Baptist pastor.

== Personal life ==
Schoemaker was born in Muscatine, Iowa, on September 4, 1863, as the eldest of 11 children. He married Helen Taylor (died 1921) in 1902, and after her death he married Helen Browning (died 1925) in 1922. He retired to San Diego in 1933 because of poor health. Schoemaker died in San Diego on September 19, 1937. He is buried at Greenwood Cemetery in Muscatine.

== Career ==
Schoemaker graduated from Iowa State College with a bachelor's degree in 1889. He was a mathematics instructor at Cornell University until the age of 31, and then took up the study of theology. He served as the pastor of the First Baptist Church in Menominee, Michigan, when he received his PhD with a dissertation on the use of "spirit" in the Old Testament. He was also pastor of First Baptist Church, Glenwood, Iowa.

== Works ==
- Gospel According to the Hebrews Chicago 1902
- The use of ruah in the old testament and of pneuma in the new Testament 1904
