= Muscatine, Iowa =

- City
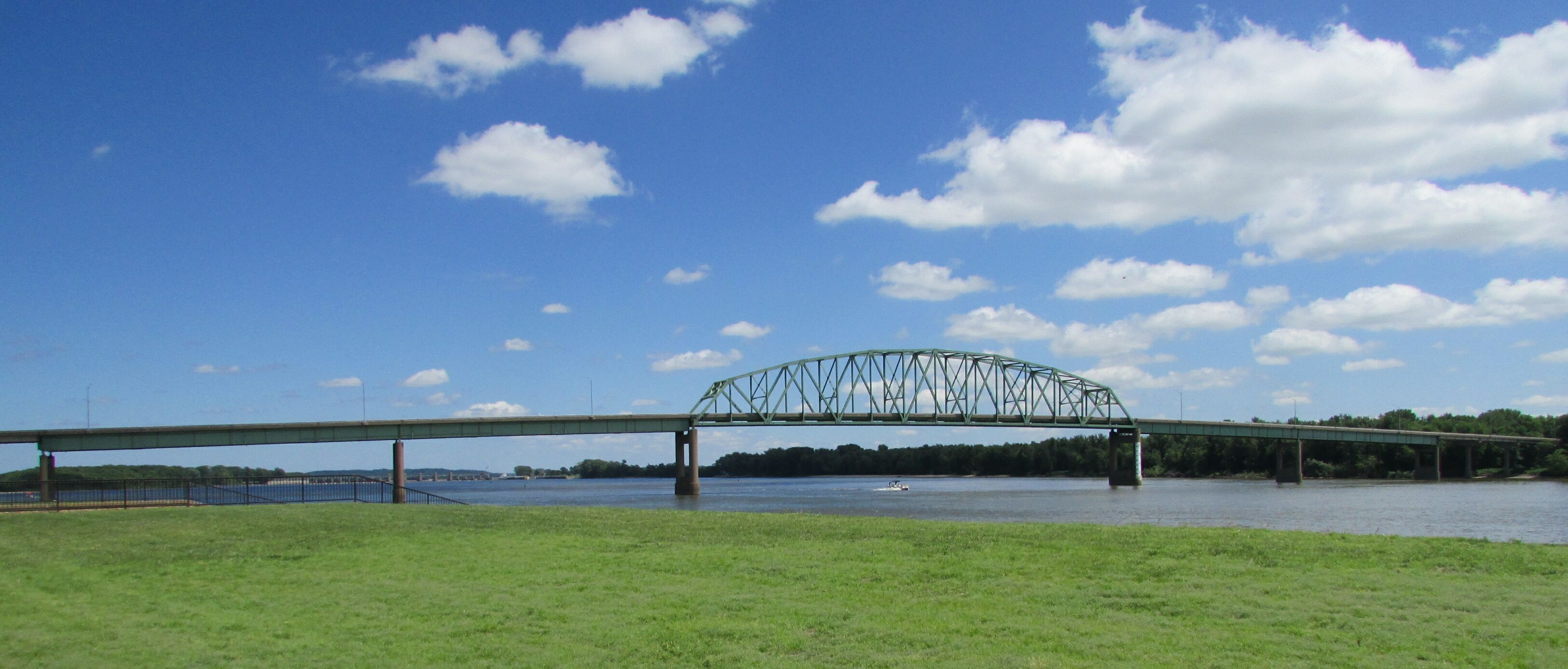
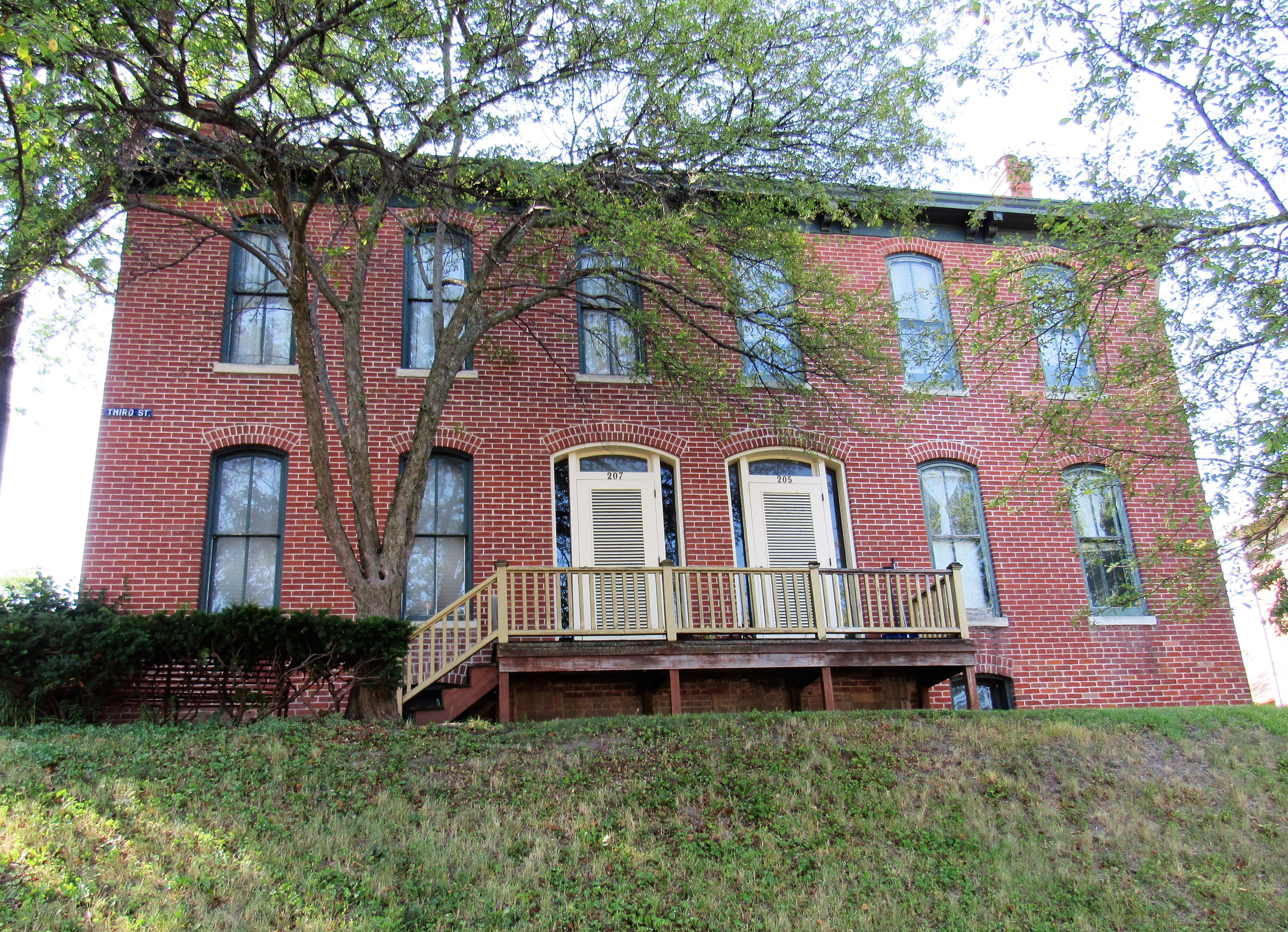
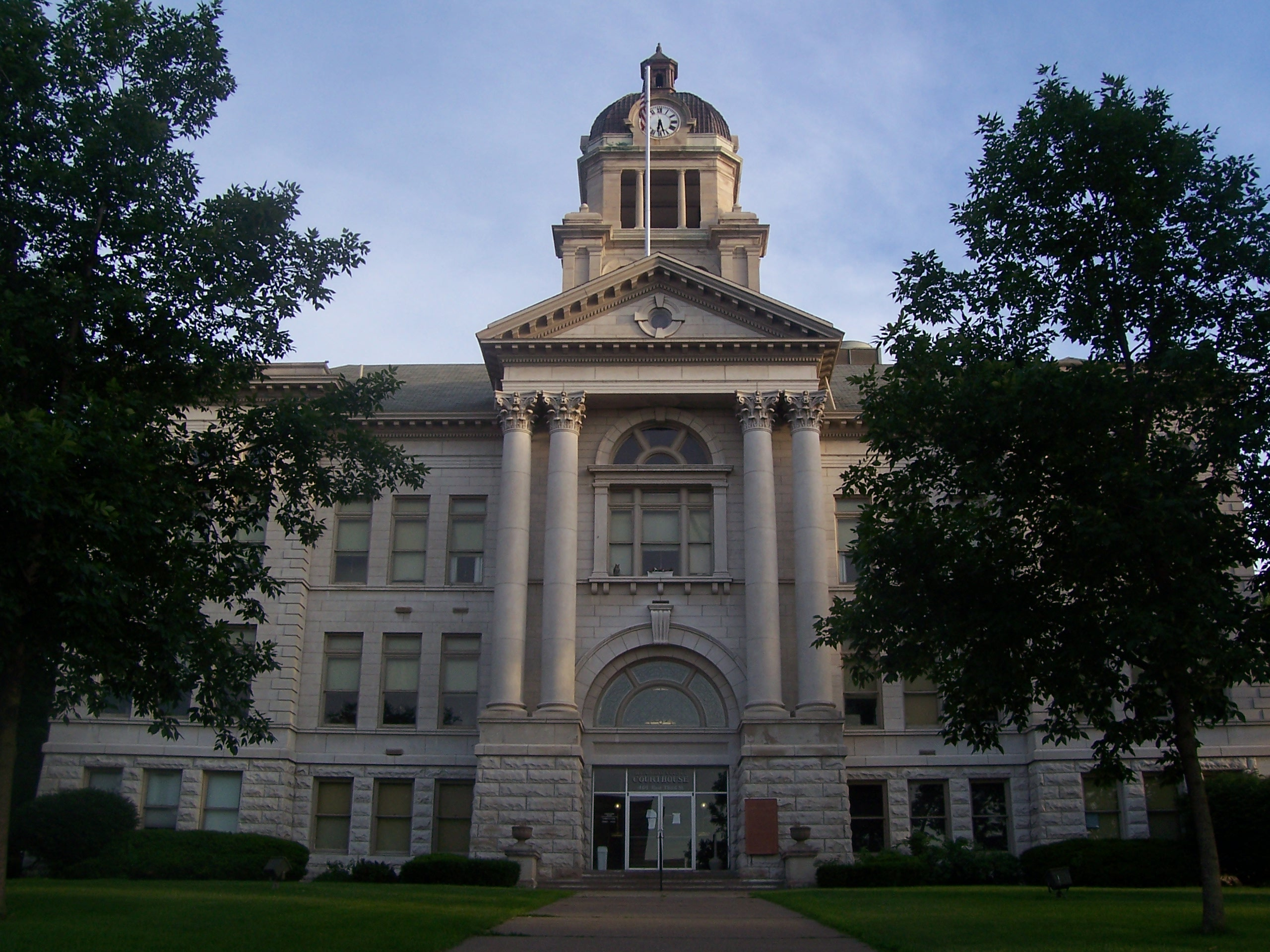
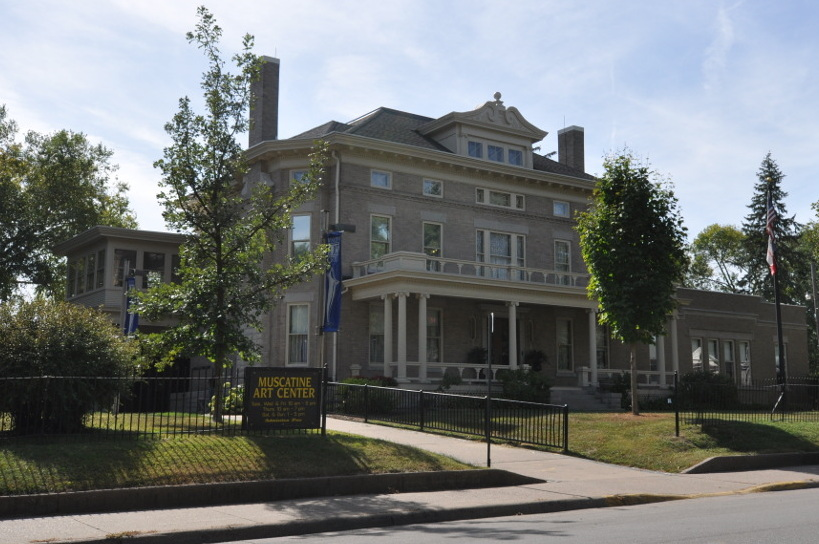
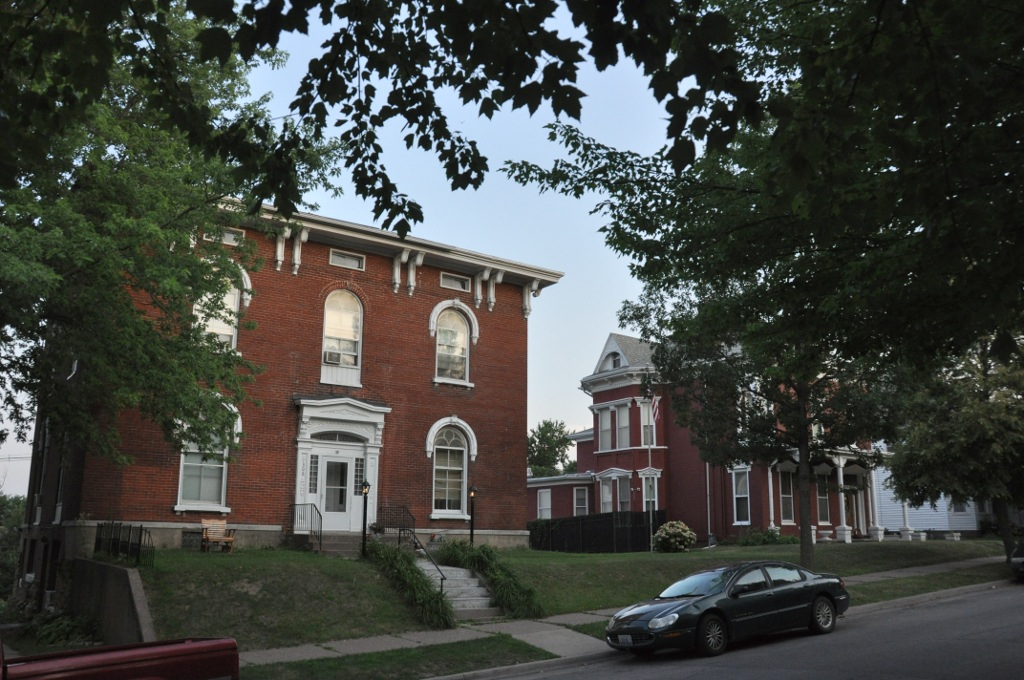
- Mississippi River and Norbert F. Beckey Bridge Alexander Clark House Muscatine County Courthouse Muscatine Art Center West Hill Historic District
- Nickname: "The Pearl of the Mississippi"
- Interactive map of Muscatine, Iowa
- Location within Iowa Location within the United States
- Coordinates: 41°25′28″N 91°02′36″W
- Country: United States
- State: Iowa
- County: Muscatine
- Incorporated: 1839

Government
  - Mayor: Brad Bark

Area
  - City: 19.25 sq mi (49.86 km^{2})
  - Land: 18.20 sq mi (47.13 km^{2})
  - Water: 1.05 sq mi (2.73 km^{2})
- Elevation: 722 ft (220 m)

Population (2020)
  - City: 23,797
  - Rank: 22nd in Iowa
  - Density: 1,307.8/sq mi (504.95/km^{2})
  - Metro: 54,741
- Time zone: UTC−6 (CST)
  - Summer (DST): UTC−5 (CDT)
- ZIP Code: 52761
- Area code: 563
- FIPS code: 19-55110
- GNIS feature ID: 2395143
- Website: www.muscatineiowa.gov

Muscatine (/ˌmʌskəˈtin/ MUSS-kə-TEEN) is a city in and the county seat of Muscatine County, Iowa, United States. The population was 23,797 at the 2020 census, an increase from 22,697 in 2000. It is located along the Mississippi River across from Illinois.

Muscatine is the principal city of the Muscatine micropolitan area, which includes all of Muscatine and Louisa counties. The local business association states that the name Muscatine is not used by any other community.

== History ==
=== 1833–1899 ===
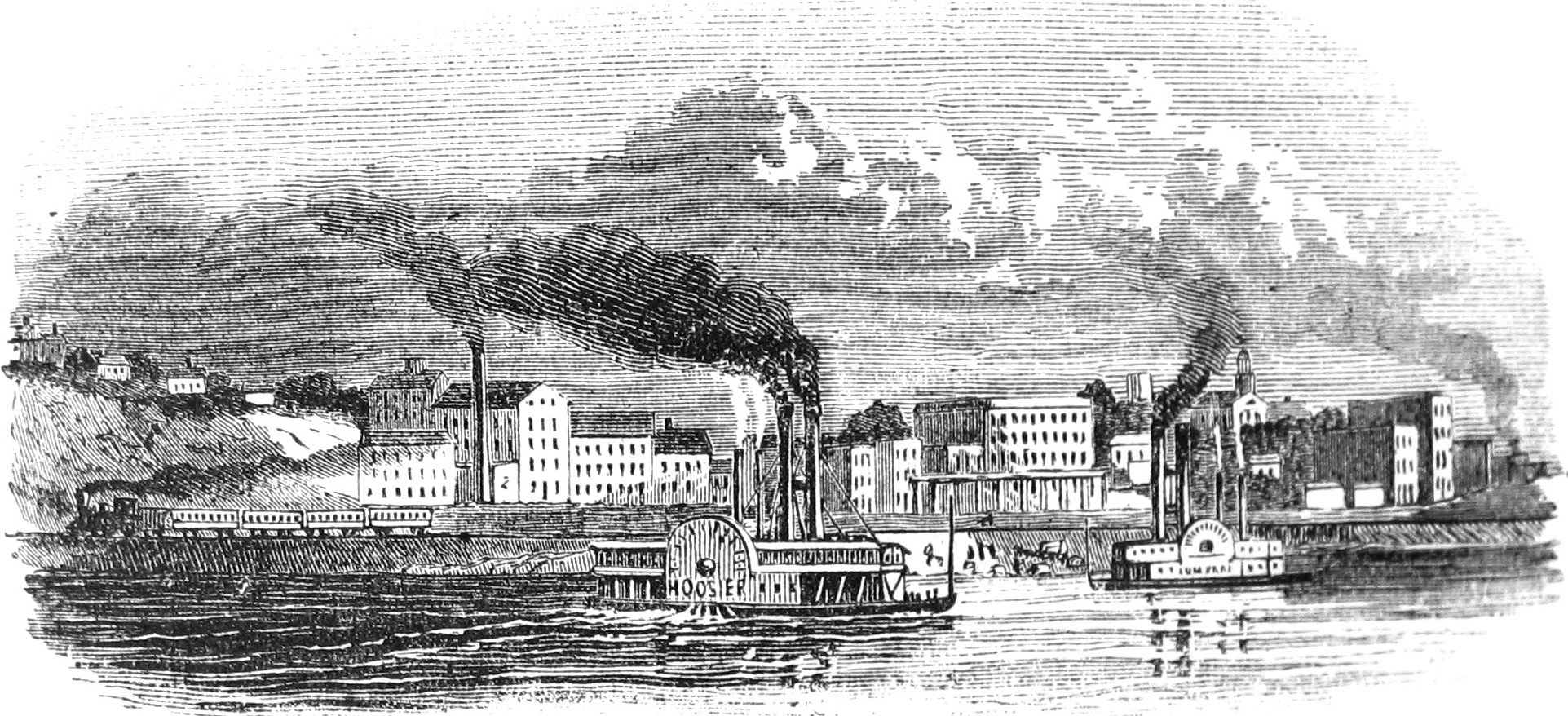
Muscatine in 1865

Muscatine began as a trading post founded by representatives of Colonel George Davenport in 1833. Muscatine was incorporated as Bloomington in 1839; the name was changed to reduce mail delivery confusion, as there were several Bloomingtons in the Midwest. Before that, Muscatine had also been known as "Newburg" and "Casey's Landing".

The origin of the name Muscatine is debated. It may have been derived from the Mascouten Native American tribe. The Mascoutin lived along the Mississippi in the 1700s. In 1819 Muscatine Island was known as Mascoutin Island.

In the 1838 United States General Land Office map, the town is labelled Musquitine, which may be a variation of Musquakeen, an alternative name for Muscatine Island; Musquakeen may have derived from the Meskwaki indigenous people who lived close by. Major William Williams, who was visiting in 1849 when the town was still called both Bloomington and Muscatine, claimed, "Muscatine in English is Fire Island," in his list of the meanings of Siouan language names.

Williams wrote a brief description of the settlement:

Bloomington is a fine town, one of the most important points in the state. Its situation on one of the great bends of the Mississippi has great commercial advantages; [it] is the seat of justice of Muscatine County. Contains about 2000 inhabitants, is the natural depository for a vast amount of trade from the surrounding country, has many neat residences and several spacious brick mercantile establishments- a large steam mill, one smaller one, two printing establishments, 6 churches, 4 physicians, 8 lawyers, an neat court house and jail, Masonic lodge, etc.... This town is very prettily situated, in part on a level on the river for two streets back, when the ground rises and the remaining street is elevated in benches, the whole standing in a rise enclosed by a range of high bluffs which runs around it in a semicircular form, forming beautiful sites for residences. From the bluff there is a beautiful view of the town below and of the Mississippi for miles up and down. All steam boats land here, passing up and down.

— Major William Williams

From the 1840s to the Civil War, Muscatine had Iowa's largest black community, consisting of fugitive slaves who had traveled the Mississippi from the South and free blacks who had migrated from the eastern states. One of the most prominent community leaders was Alexander G. Clark Sr., born free in Pennsylvania. He was a barber, a respected position at the time, and eventually became a wealthy timber salesman and real estate speculator. In 1848 he was among the founders of the local African Methodist Episcopal Church, which had been established as the first independent black denomination in the US.

In the antebellum period he assisted fugitive slaves, and petitioned the state government to overturn racist laws before the Civil War. In 1863, Clark helped organize Iowa's black regiment, the 60th United States Colored Infantry (originally known as the 1st Iowa Infantry, African Descent), though an injury prevented him from serving.

In 1868, he gained desegregation of Iowa's public schools by suing the Muscatine school board after his daughter Susan was turned away from her neighborhood school. Eleven years later, in 1879 his son Alexander Jr. became the first black graduate of the University of Iowa College of Law and its first black graduate from any department. Clark Sr. went to the college and became its second black law graduate five years later, despite being 58 years old. He said that he wanted to serve “as an example to young men of his own race.” Clark rose to prominence in the Republican Party, serving as a delegate to state and national conventions.

In 1890, Clark was appointed ambassador to Liberia by President Benjamin Harrison. He was one of four Muscatine residents to be appointed as a diplomatic envoy between 1855 and 1900, a remarkable feat for a town of such small size: George Van Horne was consul at Marseille, France during the 1860s; Samuel McNutt served at Maracaibo, Venezuela in 1890; and Frank W. Mahin represented his country in Liberec (Reichenberg), Austria-Hungary in 1900.

Less than a year after arriving in Liberia, Clark died of fever. His body was returned to the US, where he was buried in Muscatine's Greenwood Cemetery. In 1975 the city moved his former house about 200 feet (61 m), to make room for a low-income apartment complex for senior citizens; the latter was named in his honor. The University of Iowa's chapter of the Black Law Students Association (BLSA) is named for the Clarks, as a testament to the accomplishments of father and son, and their places in the history of civil rights in Iowa.

Mark Twain lived in the city briefly during the summer of 1855 while working at the local newspaper, the Muscatine Journal, which was partly owned by his brother, Orion Clemens.

He noted some recollections of Muscatine in his book Life on the Mississippi:

And I remember Muscatine—still more pleasantly—for its summer sunsets. I have never seen any, on either side of the ocean, that equaled them. They used the broad smooth river as a canvas, and painted on it every imaginable dream of color, from the mottled daintinesses and delicacies of the opal, all the way up, through cumulative intensities, to blinding purple and crimson conflagrations which were enchanting to the eye, but sharply tried it at the same time. All the Upper Mississippi region has these extraordinary sunsets as a familiar spectacle. It is the true Sunset Land: I am sure no other country can show so good a right to the name. The sunrises are also said to be exceedingly fine. I do not know.

— Mark Twain

In 1884, J. F. Boepple, a German immigrant, founded a pearl button company in Muscatine. He produced buttons that looked like pearls by machine-punching them from freshwater mussel shells harvested from the Mississippi River. Muscatine's slogan, "Pearl of the Mississippi," refers to the days when pearl button manufacturing by the McKee Button Company was a significant economic contributor. In 1915, Weber & Sons Button Co., Inc. was the world's largest producer of fancy freshwater pearl buttons. From that time forward, Muscatine was known as "The Pearl Button Capital of the World". Weber is still manufacturing today and celebrated its 100-year anniversary in 2004.

Muscatine is nearly as well known as the "Watermelon Capital of the World", a title that reflects the agricultural rural nature of the county (several other cities, including Cordele, GA and Hope, AR also lay claim to this title.)

=== 1900–present ===
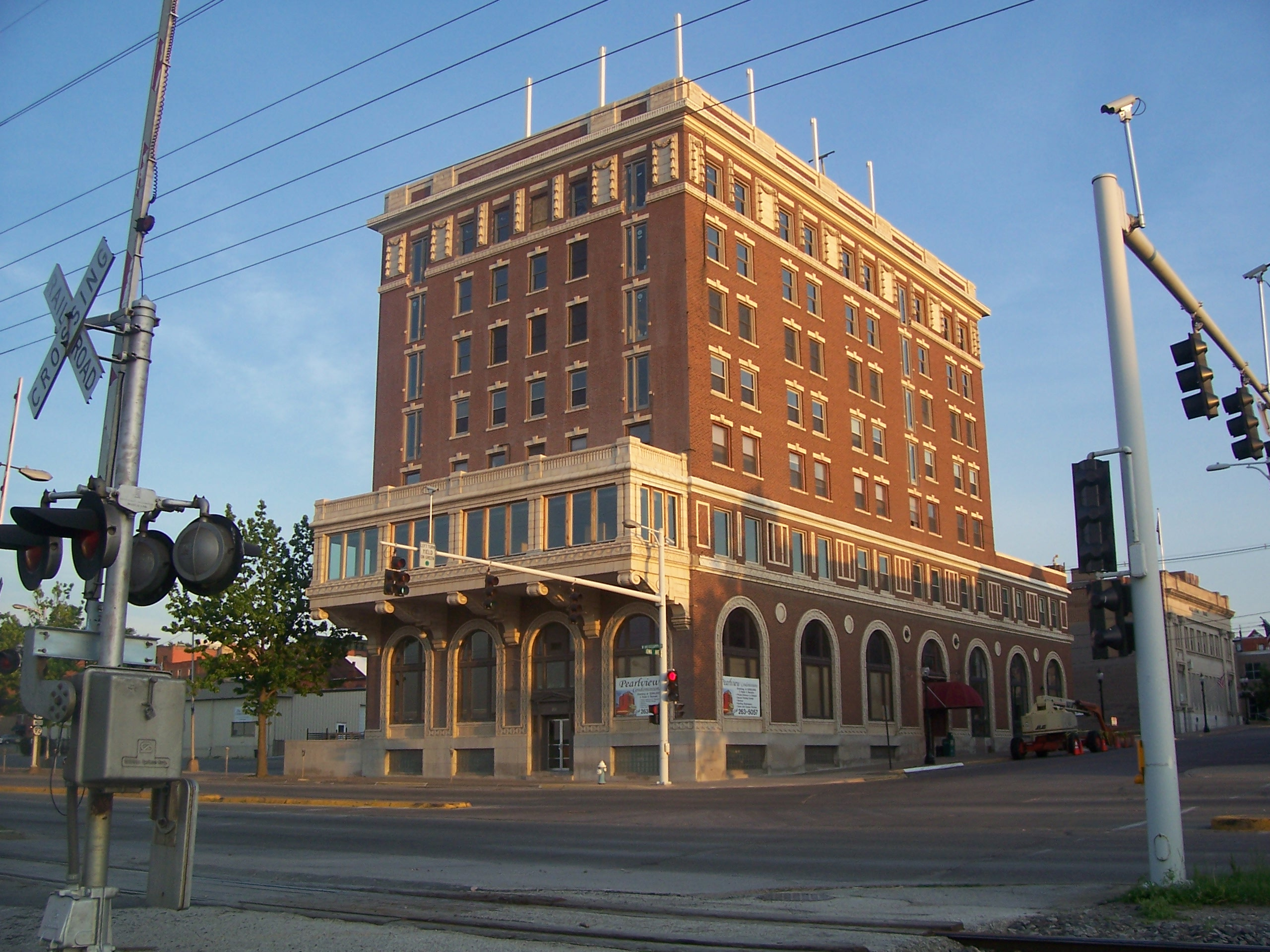
The former Hotel Muscatine

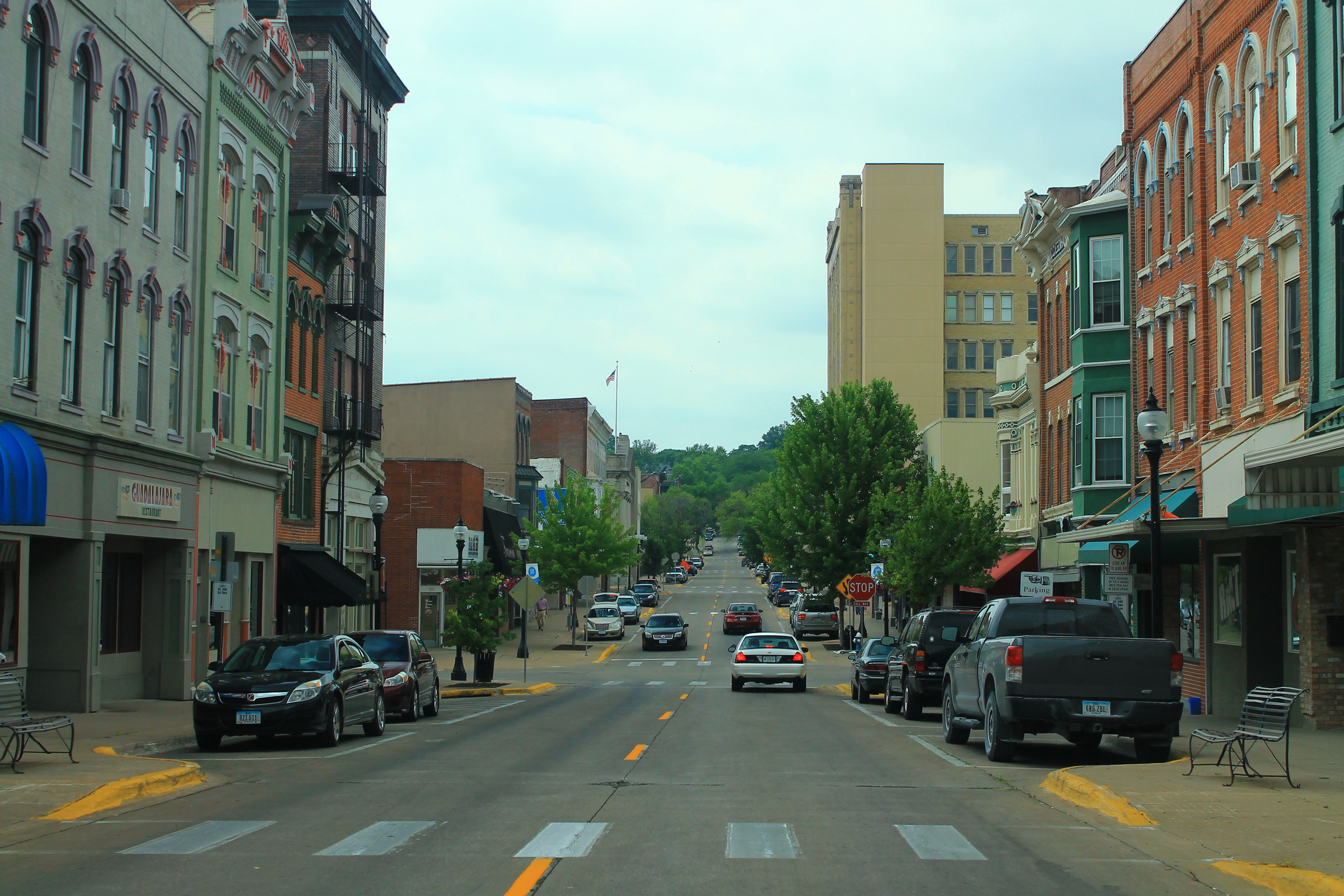
Downtown Muscatine

Muscatine was home to minor league baseball. The Muscatine Muskies was the last moniker of the minor league teams that played in Muscatine from 1910 to 1916. Muscatine was a member of the Northern Association (1910) and Central Association (1911–1916). Baseball Hall of Fame member Sam Rice played for the Muscatine Wallopers in 1912. Muscatine played at League Field, now named "Tom Bruner Field".

Muscatine was the home town and operating location of broadcaster Norman G. Baker, inventor of the calliaphone. In 1925–1931, Baker operated the powerful radio station KTNT, published a newspaper, and operated the Baker Institute, a clinic. He also owned numerous businesses in the town.

Muscatine was formerly a stop on the shared Chicago, Rock Island and Pacific Railroad and Milwaukee Road line. Restructuring of the railroads followed declines in passenger traffic and the Rock Island station was eventually demolished. The two railroads split near the railroad crossing on county highway X61. A portion of the Milwaukee Road's line is extant; it serves business and is used for the storage of rolling stock.

The city's main shopping district is Muscatine Mall, opened in 1971.

Muscatine was hit by an EF3 tornado on June 1, 2007, which destroyed or damaged areas of the city.

On February 15, 2012, Xi Jinping, Vice President of the People's Republic of China, visited Muscatine. He had previously visited in 1985 as part of a Chinese delegation to learn about American agriculture. (Note: In 1980 accompanied by Jan Berris of the National Committee on US-China Relations, Xi Jinping's father Xi Zhongxun visited New York City, Washington, D.C., Iowa, Colorado, California and Hawaii. In Muscatine, Sarah Lande sponsored Xi Jinping during his visits and has visited China numerous times, too.) He returned to Muscatine when he toured the U.S. in 2012 before becoming president. The visit prompted the public appearance of both supporters and protesters. The latter criticized China's human rights record in Tibet.

In 2017, the 33,000-square-foot (3,100 m^{2}) Sino-U.S. Cultural Center was established for $1 million (equivalent to $1.31 million in 2025), by Glad Cheng (born 1971), owner of Muscatine Travel and chairman of the China Windows Group Inc.

On June 1, 2026, a mass shooting occurred in Muscatine when a resident, 52-year-old Ryan Willis McFarland, killed six of his family members in multiple locations of the city, before committing suicide. The victims were his wife, children, and other extended family members.

== Geography ==
According to the United States Census Bureau, the city has a total area of 18.35 square miles (47.53 km^{2}), of which 17.30 square miles (44.81 km^{2}) is land and 1.05 square miles (2.72 km^{2}) is water.

Muscatine is primarily located on a series of bluffs and hills at a major west-south bend in the Mississippi River. The river-bend gives the city roughly 260 degrees of riverfront. The "highland" area of the town is divided into three ridge-like hills by Papoose Creek and Mad Creek, each of which flow individually into the Mississippi in downtown Muscatine. The city's main roads follow these ridges and valleys in a radial fashion.

Several large working-class neighborhoods and industrial sectors have been built on what is called "Muscatine Island". This flat, sandy expanse was largely underwater before a portion of the Mississippi River rerouted to follow the course of the present-day Muscatine Slough. It is unclear when the river changed course. The hills, river, and island are all integral to the diversity of Muscatine's economy and housing sector. As the city's urbanized area develops, the areas of highest elevation in the "High Prairie" crescent (between the Cedar and Mississippi Rivers) are increasingly taken from agricultural use and developed as suburban housing.

Positioned some 25 miles (40 km) (30 minutes) from the Quad Cities, 38 miles (61 km) (52 minutes) from Iowa City and some 68 miles (109 km) (75 minutes) from Cedar Rapids, Muscatine is the smallest link in a non-contiguous populated area which surpassed 800,000 residents in the decade following the 2000 census. The key feature of this region is that although the populated areas are non-contiguous, a high percentage of residents commute among the cities for work, particularly those in professional fields.

=== Climate ===
Climate data for Muscatine, Iowa (1991–2020 normals, extremes 1935–present)
| Month | Jan | Feb | Mar | Apr | May | Jun | Jul | Aug | Sep | Oct | Nov | Dec | Year |
|---|---|---|---|---|---|---|---|---|---|---|---|---|---|
| Record high °F (°C) | 69 (21) | 74 (23) | 89 (32) | 93 (34) | 96 (36) | 104 (40) | 111 (44) | 107 (42) | 101 (38) | 96 (36) | 81 (27) | 72 (22) | 111 (44) |
| Mean daily maximum °F (°C) | 31.0 (−0.6) | 35.9 (2.2) | 49.5 (9.7) | 63.1 (17.3) | 73.6 (23.1) | 82.3 (27.9) | 85.4 (29.7) | 83.3 (28.5) | 77.6 (25.3) | 64.5 (18.1) | 49.0 (9.4) | 36.1 (2.3) | 60.9 (16.1) |
| Daily mean °F (°C) | 22.1 (−5.5) | 26.7 (−2.9) | 39.0 (3.9) | 51.2 (10.7) | 62.3 (16.8) | 71.6 (22.0) | 74.8 (23.8) | 72.6 (22.6) | 65.7 (18.7) | 53.2 (11.8) | 39.3 (4.1) | 27.8 (−2.3) | 50.5 (10.3) |
| Mean daily minimum °F (°C) | 13.1 (−10.5) | 17.4 (−8.1) | 28.4 (−2.0) | 39.4 (4.1) | 50.9 (10.5) | 60.8 (16.0) | 64.2 (17.9) | 62.0 (16.7) | 53.7 (12.1) | 41.8 (5.4) | 29.6 (−1.3) | 19.5 (−6.9) | 40.1 (4.5) |
| Record low °F (°C) | −31 (−35) | −34 (−37) | −18 (−28) | 10 (−12) | 26 (−3) | 33 (1) | 44 (7) | 39 (4) | 23 (−5) | 17 (−8) | −5 (−21) | −23 (−31) | −34 (−37) |
| Average precipitation inches (mm) | 1.51 (38) | 1.78 (45) | 2.55 (65) | 3.82 (97) | 5.11 (130) | 5.46 (139) | 4.25 (108) | 4.26 (108) | 3.91 (99) | 3.04 (77) | 2.28 (58) | 2.00 (51) | 39.97 (1,015) |
| Average snowfall inches (cm) | 7.0 (18) | 5.8 (15) | 2.8 (7.1) | 0.7 (1.8) | 0.0 (0.0) | 0.0 (0.0) | 0.0 (0.0) | 0.0 (0.0) | 0.0 (0.0) | 0.2 (0.51) | 0.8 (2.0) | 6.2 (16) | 23.5 (60) |
| Average precipitation days (≥ 0.01 in) | 7.7 | 7.8 | 9.1 | 11.3 | 13.4 | 12.4 | 9.2 | 10.1 | 8.4 | 9.8 | 8.2 | 8.6 | 116.0 |
| Average snowy days (≥ 0.1 in) | 4.9 | 3.5 | 1.4 | 0.3 | 0.0 | 0.0 | 0.0 | 0.0 | 0.0 | 0.1 | 0.7 | 3.2 | 14.1 |
Source: NOAA

== Demographics ==
Historical population
| Census | Pop. | Note | %± |
|---|---|---|---|
| 1850 | 2,540 | | — |
| 1860 | 5,324 | | 109.6% |
| 1870 | 6,718 | | 26.2% |
| 1880 | 8,295 | | 23.5% |
| 1890 | 11,454 | | 38.1% |
| 1900 | 14,073 | | 22.9% |
| 1910 | 16,178 | | 15.0% |
| 1920 | 16,068 | | −0.7% |
| 1930 | 16,778 | | 4.4% |
| 1940 | 18,286 | | 9.0% |
| 1950 | 19,041 | | 4.1% |
| 1960 | 20,997 | | 10.3% |
| 1970 | 22,405 | | 6.7% |
| 1980 | 23,467 | | 4.7% |
| 1990 | 22,881 | | −2.5% |
| 2000 | 22,697 | | −0.8% |
| 2010 | 22,886 | | 0.8% |
| 2020 | 23,797 | | 4.0% |
U.S. Decennial Census

=== 2020 census ===
As of the 2020 census, Muscatine had a population of 23,797 with 9,623 households and 5,960 families. The population density was 1,308.9 inhabitants per square mile (505.4/km^{2}). There were 10,541 housing units at an average density of 579.8 per square mile (223.9/km^{2}).

Of the 9,623 households, 30.1% had children under the age of 18 living in them; 41.6% were married-couple households, 9.5% were cohabitating couples, 28.4% had a female householder with no spouse or partner present, and 20.5% had a male householder with no spouse or partner present. About 31.2% of all households were made up of individuals, and 13.3% had someone living alone who was 65 years of age or older.

Housing units had an overall vacancy rate of 8.7%; the homeowner vacancy rate was 1.2% and the rental vacancy rate was 9.9%.

The median age was 37.9 years; 26.2% of residents were under 20 (including 23.7% under 18), 6.3% were between 20 and 24, 26.0% were from 25 to 44, 24.1% were from 45 to 64, and 17.4% were 65 years of age or older. For every 100 females there were 98.7 males, and for every 100 females age 18 and over there were 97.6 males age 18 and over.

Of residents, 98.1% lived in urban areas, while 1.9% lived in rural areas.

Racial composition as of the 2020 census
| Race | Number | Percent |
|---|---|---|
| White | 18,455 | 77.6% |
| Black or African American | 1,028 | 4.3% |
| American Indian and Alaska Native | 138 | 0.6% |
| Asian | 237 | 1.0% |
| Native Hawaiian and Other Pacific Islander | 0 | 0.0% |
| Some other race | 2,003 | 8.4% |
| Two or more races | 1,936 | 8.1% |
| Hispanic or Latino (of any race) | 4,557 | 19.1% |

=== American Community Survey estimates ===
From 2019 to 2023 the median household income (in 2023 dollars) was $59,332, the per capita income in the past 12 months (in 2023 dollars) was $31,057, and 16.5% of persons were in poverty per American Community Survey poverty estimate.

=== 2010 census ===
As of the 2010 United States census, there were 22,886 people, 9,008 households, and 5,923 families residing in the city. The population density was 1,322.9 inhabitants per square mile (510.8/km^{2}). There were 9,830 housing units at an average density of 568.2 per square mile (219.4/km^{2}). The racial makeup of the city was 87.8% White, 2.3% African American, 0.5% Native American, 0.8% Asian, 6.4% from other races, and 2.2% from two or more races. Hispanic or Latino people of any race were 16.6% of the population.

There were 9,008 households, of which 34.3% had children under the age of 18 living with them, 46.8% were married couples living together, 13.4% had a female householder with no husband present, 5.5% had a male householder with no wife present, and 34.2% were non-families. 28.0% of all households were made up of individuals, and 11.4% had someone living alone who was 65 years of age or older. The average household size was 2.50 and the average family size was 3.04.

The median age in the city was 36.1 years. 26.4% of residents were under the age of 18; 8.6% were between the ages of 18 and 24; 25.7% were from 25 to 44; 25.7% were from 45 to 64; and 13.6% were 65 years of age or older. The gender makeup of the city was 49.1% male and 50.9% female.

=== 2000 census ===
As of the 2000 United States census, there were 22,697 people, 8,923 households, and 6,040 families residing in the city. The population density was 1,348.1 inhabitants per square mile (520.5/km^{2}). There were 9,375 housing units at an average density of 556.9 per square mile (215.0/km^{2}). The racial makeup of the city was 90.40% White, 1.08% African American, 0.37% Native American, 0.65% Asian, 0.03% Pacific Islander, 6.04% from other races, and 1.44% from two or more races. Hispanic or Latino people of any race were 12.30% of the population.

There were 8,923 households, out of which 33.4% had children under the age of 18 living with them, 52.7% were married couples living together, 11.0% had a female householder with no husband present, and 32.3% were non-families. 27.4% of all households were made up of individuals, and 11.4% had someone living alone who was 65 years of age or older. The average household size was 2.49 and the average family size was 3.04.

Age spread: 26.4% under the age of 18, 9.2% from 18 to 24, 28.6% from 25 to 44, 21.9% from 45 to 64, and 14.0% who were 65 years of age or older. The median age was 36 years. For every 100 females, there were 94.7 males. For every 100 females age 18 and over, there were 90.2 males.

The median income for a household in the city was $38,122, and the median income for a family was $45,366. Males had a median income of $36,440 versus $23,953 for females. The per capita income for the city was $19,483. About 8.0% of families and 10.9% of the population were below the poverty line, including 13.2% of those under age 18 and 9.6% of those age 65 or over.

== Economy ==
Companies in Muscatine include Bridgestone Bandag, H. J. Heinz Company, The Raymond Corporation Carver Pump, the Kent Corporation with its subsidiaries: Kent Nutrition Group, Grain Processing Corporation and Kent Pet Group, Musco Lighting and Stanley Consultants. As of 2024, Bayers Muscatine plant supplied 70% of North America's Roundup. The Musser Lumber Company was one of Iowa's pioneer lumber concerns.

Headquartered in Muscatine, The HNI Corporation designs and manufactures office furniture including chairs, filing cabinets, workstations, tables, desks and educational furniture under various brand names The HON Company, Allsteel, HBF, Artcobell, Paoli, Gunlocke, Maxon, Lamex, bpergo, and Midwest Folding Products.

== Arts and culture ==
=== Points of interest ===
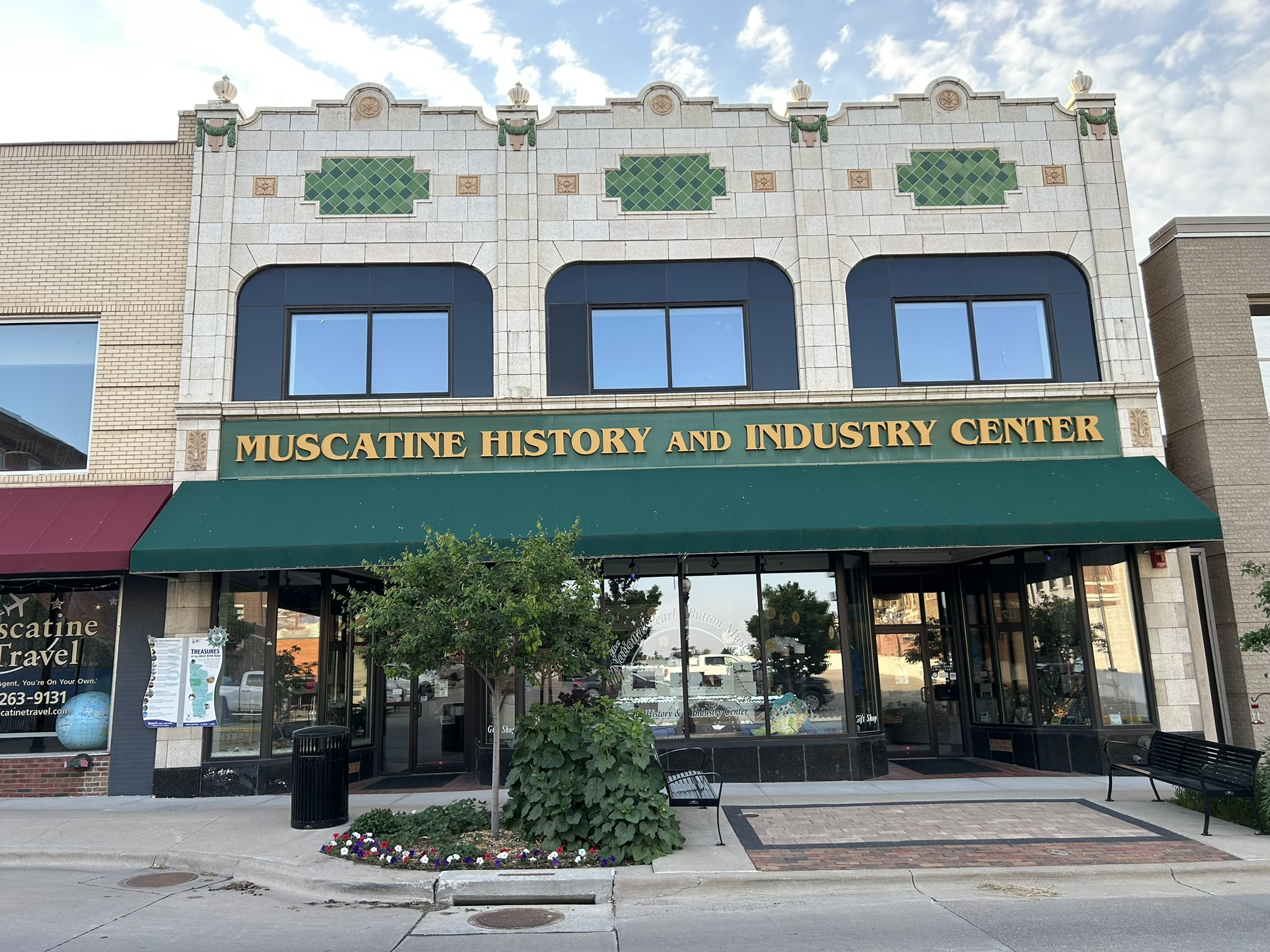
Muscatine History and Industry Center, home of the National Pearl Button Museum.

- Riverfront (which includes the Pearl City Station, Riverview Center, Riverside Park, and "Mississippi Harvest" sculpture by Erik Blome)
- Mark Twain Scenic Overlook
- Kent Stein Park (which includes historic Tom Bruner Field)
- Weed Park and Aquatic Center
- Muscatine Community Stadium and the nearby Pearl City Rugby field
- Muscatine History and Industry Center
- Muscatine Art Center, including Musser Mansion and the Stanley Gallery
- Weed Mansion, Alexander G. Clark House, and many other historic homes dating back to the mid-19th century
- Two historic districts (Downtown and West Hill) are listed on the National Register of Historic Places
- Discovery Park and Environmental Learning Center
- W. Joseph Fuller House
- St. Mathias Catholic Church
- Sinnett Octagon House
- Pearl Button Museum
- Former Muscatine North & South Railway Depot on the riverfront (referred to locally as the Red Brick Building)

== Education ==
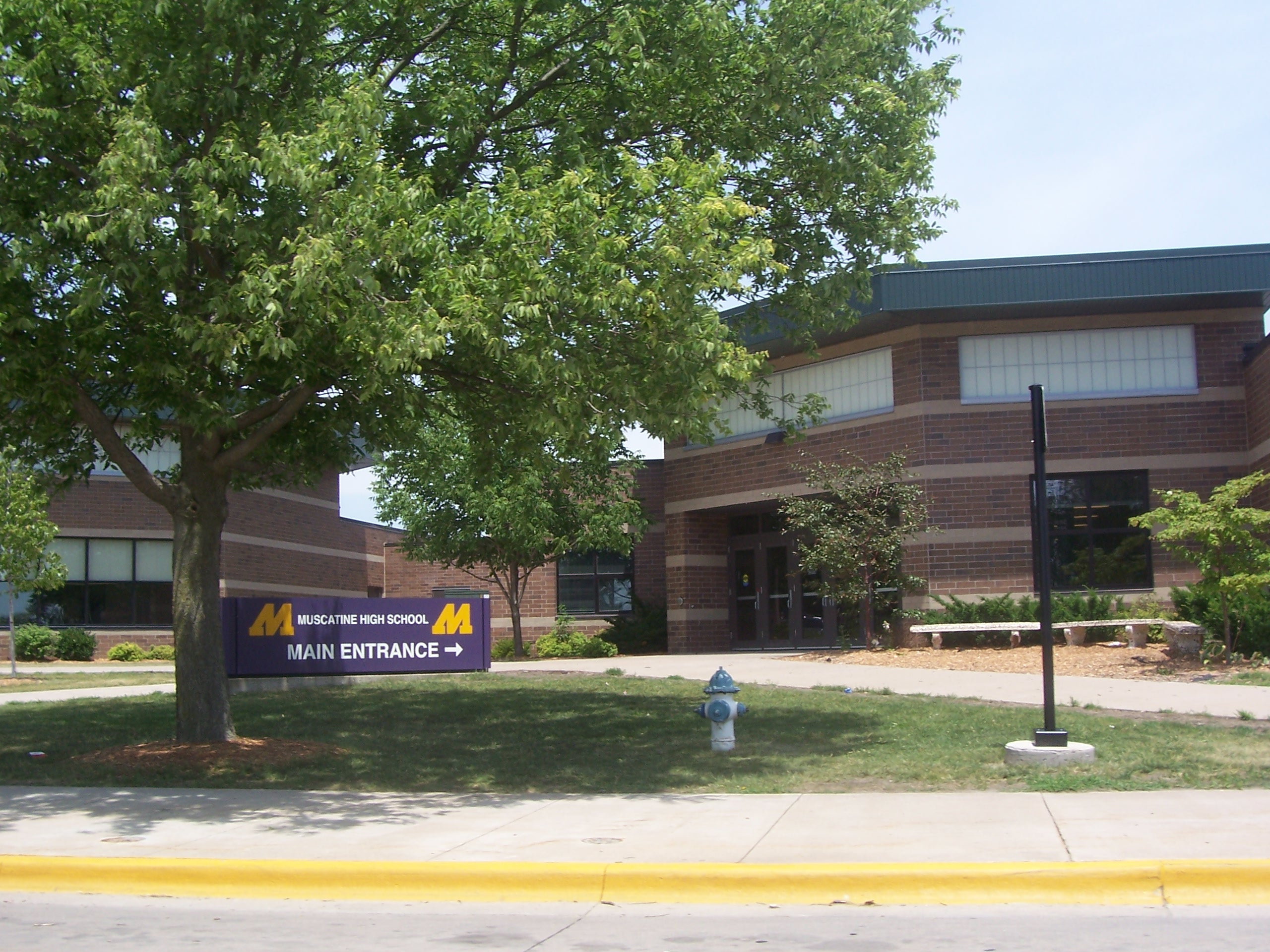
Muscatine High School

Muscatine Community School District is home to Muscatine High School, which has the athletic teams under the name Muscatine Muskies. The district covers almost all of the city limits. A small portion of the city limits is within the Louisa–Muscatine Community School District.

Muscatine is home to Muscatine Community College and the MCC Cardinals.

== Media ==
=== Print ===
The Muscatine Journal newspaper circulates daily Monday through Saturday throughout the Muscatine area and on muscatinejournal.com. Established in 1840, the Muscatine Journal was once owned by Mark Twain's brother, Orion Clemens, and Twain wrote for the paper during his time in Muscatine. The publication and its weekly shopper Hometown Extra have been owned by Lee Enterprises, based in Davenport, Iowa, which as of January 2025 owned 72 markets in 25 states.

The Voice of Muscatine, a publication of Jam Media Solutions, has been an operation newspaper since October 28, 2015. It is a county-wide publication, servicing Muscatine County.

=== Radio ===
Krieger Media Company has two radio stations in Muscatine; KWPC (AM) has been a long part of the city's history since 1946, and KMCS-FM has been in the community since 1996.

Townsquare Media's KBEA-FM transmits from a tower near 10 miles (16 km) north of Muscatine, but broadcasts from studios shared with other Townsquare Media stations in the Quad Cities community of Davenport.

Residents also receive radio broadcasts from stations in the Quad Cities, Iowa City, Cedar Rapids, Burlington, Waterloo, and Aledo, Illinois (WRMJ).

=== Television ===
Muscatine and Muscatine County are part of the Quad Cities Television Market. As such, all broadcast stations from this market are available both over-the-air and on pay television providers such as cable television and satellite television. Depending on location, terrain, and type of antenna used, some Muscatine area residents can also receive television signals from Cedar Rapids–Waterloo, and the Iowa side of the Ottumwa–Kirksville market.

== Infrastructure ==
=== Transportation ===
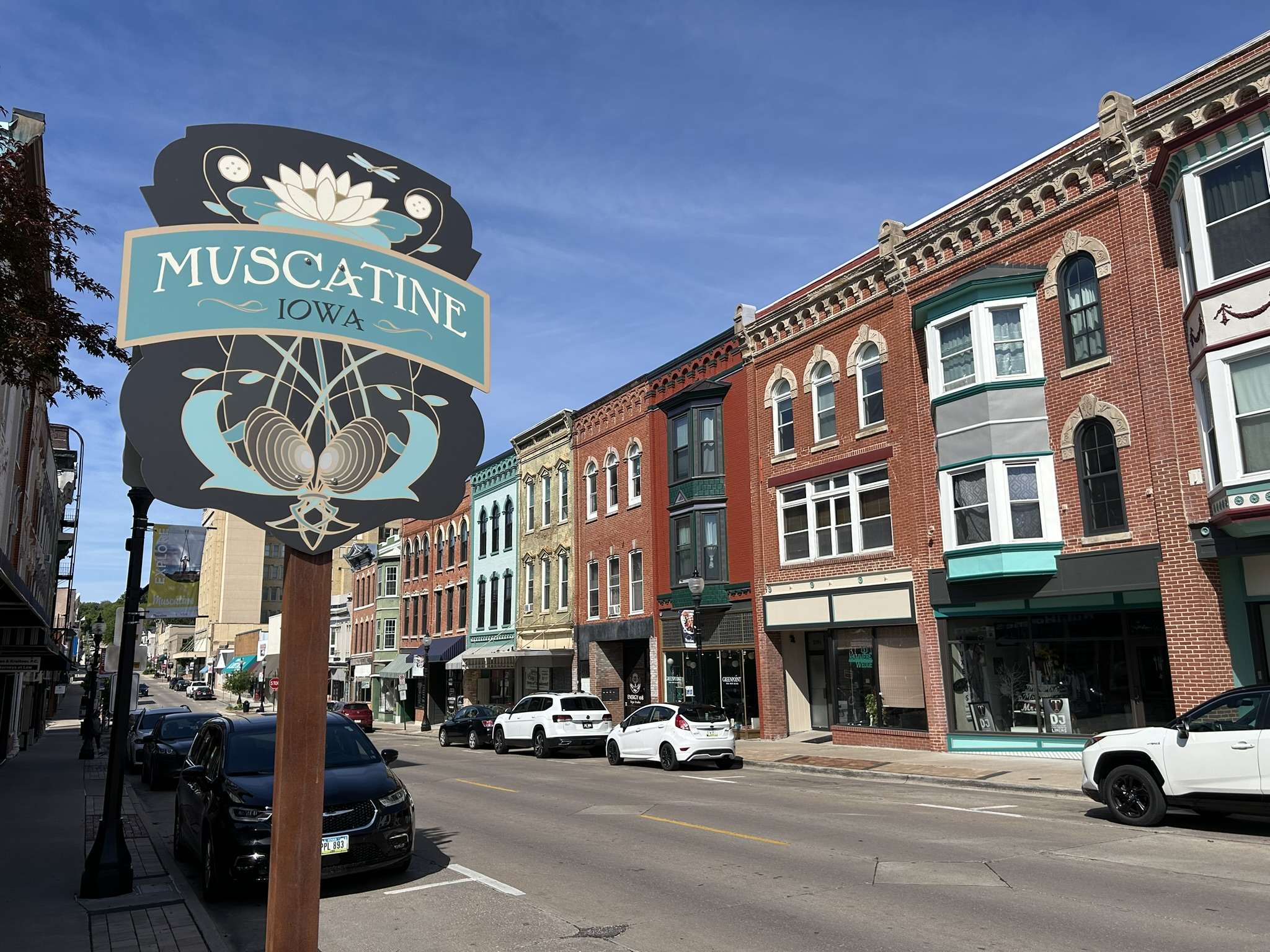
Wayfinding sign in downtown Muscatine, Iowa.

Muscatine is located along two designated routes of Iowa's "Commercial-Industrial Network", U.S. Highway 61 and Iowa Highway 92. Highway 61 serves as a major agricultural-industry route to the south from Burlington to Muscatine, where it becomes a heavy-industrial and major commuter route to the northeast between Muscatine and Davenport. In conjunction with Iowa 92, which provides access to the Avenue of the Saints (U.S. 218/IA 27) to the west and the lightly populated western Illinois via the Norbert Beckey Bridge to the east, Highway 61 serves as a shortcut for traffic from northeastern Missouri and southeastern Iowa en route to the Quad Cities, Chicago, and points beyond. Several regional highway improvement projects are in the works to further establish and capitalize on this trade-route. Additionally, Muscatine is connected to Interstate 80 to the north by fifteen miles (24 km) of Iowa Highway 38. Iowa Highway 22 also connects with U.S. 218/IA 27 to the west, and Davenport to the east. The port of Muscatine is proposed for construction.

The MuscaBus is the primary provider of mass transportation in Muscatine, with four routes serving the region. As of 2019, the system provided 149,140 rides over 21,796 annual vehicle revenue hours with 4 buses and 5 paratransit vehicles. MuscaBus operates 4 weekday bus routes on a pulse system with three routes leaving City Hall on the hour and half hour. On Saturdays, two routes operate from City Hall. Hours of operation for the system are Monday through Friday from 6:30 A.M. to 5:00 P.M and Saturdays from 8:30 A.M. to 4:15 P.M. There is no service on Sundays.

The city is served by the Muscatine Municipal Airport, which was once served by Ozark Airlines.

== Notable people ==
- Lee Allen, medical illustrator
- Norman G. Baker (1882–1958), inventor of the Calliaphone; established (KTNT) radio station
- Jack Barlow, country music singer
- Terry Beatty, artist; penciler and inker in the comic book industry
- Ellis Parker Butler, author
- Roy James Carver, industrialist and philanthropist
- Alexander Clark, diplomat; United States Ambassador to Liberia
- David C. Cloud, Iowa Attorney General and state legislator
- Max Allan Collins, crime novelist
- Stan Freese, American musician best known for his work with The Walt Disney Company.
- Al Gould, Major League Baseball player for the Cleveland Indians
- Oscar Grossheim, photographer
- Scot Halpin, fan who filled in on drums with the Who when Keith Moon collapsed during a performance
- Tom Hearst, NASCAR national racing champion
- Jim Yong Kim (born 1959), co-founder and executive director of Partners In Health
- Sarah Lacina, contestant on reality TV show Survivor: Cagayan, winner of " Survivor: Game Changers", contestant on " Survivor: Winners at War"
- Hattie Horner Louthan (1865 – 1950), writer
- Ralph P. Lowe, fourth governor of Iowa
- Emmett Lynn, actor
- James Bradley Orman, former governor of Colorado
- Dame Margherita Roberti, opera singer
- W. R. Schoemaker (1863–1937), Baptist pastor
- C. Maxwell Stanley, engineer and delegate to the United Nations
- Phil Vischer, founder of the Christian media company Big Idea Entertainment
- Murray Wier, University of Iowa basketball star, NBA player
- Joe Wieskamp, University of Iowa Basketball player and NBA draft pick
- Theodore Brent, American shipping magistrate

== Environmental problems ==
Grain Processing Corp. (GPC) has been known to pollute the air by emitting small particles from its coal burning, acetaldehyde as a byproduct from corn ethanol processing, and also lead. "The plant released more lead than any other plant in Iowa, according to Iowa Department of Natural Resources data. It emitted more acetaldehyde – a probable carcinogen chemically similar to formaldehyde – than almost any plant in the country." In 2006 GPC had to pay a $538,000 fine (equivalent to $859,219 in 2025) for violating the hourly operating limit for years. In July 2014, the company agreed to new, more stringent, air emissions permits with the Iowa Department of Natural Resources and federal regulators. The company moved from coal to natural gas as their fuel source and built a new $83 million (equivalent to $113 million in 2025) animal feed dryer to meet the new emissions requirements. The company claimed that, by 2018, these projects would reduce overall pollution by 87%.

Environmental improvements from GPC and other businesses in the area allowed EPA's Muscatine County SO2 Nonattainment Area, which includes all of the City of Muscatine, to be re-classified to attainment status for EPA's 1-hour SO2 national ambient air quality standard (NAAQS) on October 4, 2018. The actions required to achieve attainment status resulted in a reduction of over 10,000 lbs of SO2 emissions per year.

The Muscatine Area Resource Recovery for Vehicles and Energy program (MARRVE) is building a food waste collection station for the anaerobic digesters at the municipal wastewater facility. The first phase of MARRVE began operating in December 2019. MARRVE processes between 25 and 30 tons of food waste per day. MARRVE will generate biogas for vehicles and biosolids for fertilizer, while also reducing local methane emissions.

== Twin towns – sister cities ==
Muscatine's sister cities are:

- Drohobych, Ukraine
- Ichikawamisato, Japan
- Kislovodsk, Russia
- Łomża, Poland
- Ludwigslust, Germany
- Ramallah, Palestine
- Zhengding, China
