= Muscatine Journal =

Newspaper in Muscatine, Iowa

- Front page on September 1, 2005
- Type: Daily newspaper
- Format: Broadsheet
- Owner: Lee Enterprises
- Publisher: Debbie Anselm
- News editor: David Hotle
- Founded: October 27, 1840; 185 years ago, as the Bloomington Herald
- Language: English
- Headquarters: 301 East 3rd Street; Muscatine, Iowa 52761
- Country: United States
- Circulation: 1,833 Daily (as of 2023)
- ISSN: 1087-9463
- OCLC number: 15669018
- Website: muscatinejournal.com

The Muscatine Journal serves 8,000 adult readers in Muscatine and Louisa counties, in Iowa, United States, and is delivered to nearly 3,500 homes, Monday through Saturday. Hometown Extra, its sister shopper publication, is delivered every Wednesday to nearly 13.000 households. Both publications are part of Lee Enterprises, which is located in Davenport, Iowa. The Muscatine Journal also publishes news daily on their website.

== History ==
The Muscatine Journal traces its history to October 27, 1840, when the first issue of the weekly Bloomington Herald was released. On June 7, 1849, the town's name was officially changed from Bloomington to Muscatine, and the newspaper then became the Muscatine Journal.

The late John Mahin played the most significant role in the newspaper's early history and headed the Journal for more than a half-century. John Mahin was apprenticed by his father in 1847, at the age of 13, to the owners of what was then still the Bloomington Herald to learn the printing trade. Mahin and his father, Jacob, purchased the Journal in 1852. Mahin became the Journal's editor at that time, at the age of 19, and continued to publish the newspaper until his retirement in 1903. It was through Mahin that Alfred W. Lee came to Muscatine and later founded the newspaper group, which evolved into what now is Lee Enterprises, Inc.

The most famous contributor to Muscatine Journal articles was Samuel Clemens, otherwise known as Mark Twain. Clemens contributed writings to the Journal from 1853 to 1855. Clemens lived in Muscatine in 1854, when the Muscatine Journal was run by his brother, Orion Clemens.

In September 1864, John Mahin married Anne Lee, daughter of Mr. and Mrs. John B. Lee of West Branch. In about 1880, Mr. and Mrs. Lee moved to Muscatine and Mahin's father-in-law, John Lee, became the Journal's bookkeeper. With them came their youngest son, Alfred, to take a position in the Muscatine post office under John Mahin, who was the postmaster as well as the newspaper editor. Alfred W. Lee later joined the staff of the Journal and started his newspaper career there. In 1886, Lee moved to Chicago where he continued his self-education in the newspaper business. Lee returned to Iowa to buy his first newspaper in the early 1890s, when he took charge of the Ottumwa Courier. In about 1899, he acquired a controlling interest in the Davenport Times. Lee and his associates purchased the Muscatine Journal in 1903, when John Mahin had reached the age of 70 years and was ready for retirement. Walter Lane was named as the Journal's publisher when the Lee group assumed control and served until death, in 1907. The Journal has had many locations throughout its history, including the second floor of what is now DC Arnold's on Iowa Avenue.

In 1919, the current building was constructed with the pressroom and mailroom added in the early 1970s. That remodeling was made to accommodate a new Goss Community offset press, and coincided with the Journal's conversion to cold type composition. In 1999, the Muscatine Journal began printing remotely at the Quad City Times and the press area was remodeled to become the Muscatine distribution center for delivery of many regional newspapers in the Muscatine area.
