= Letts, Iowa =

- City
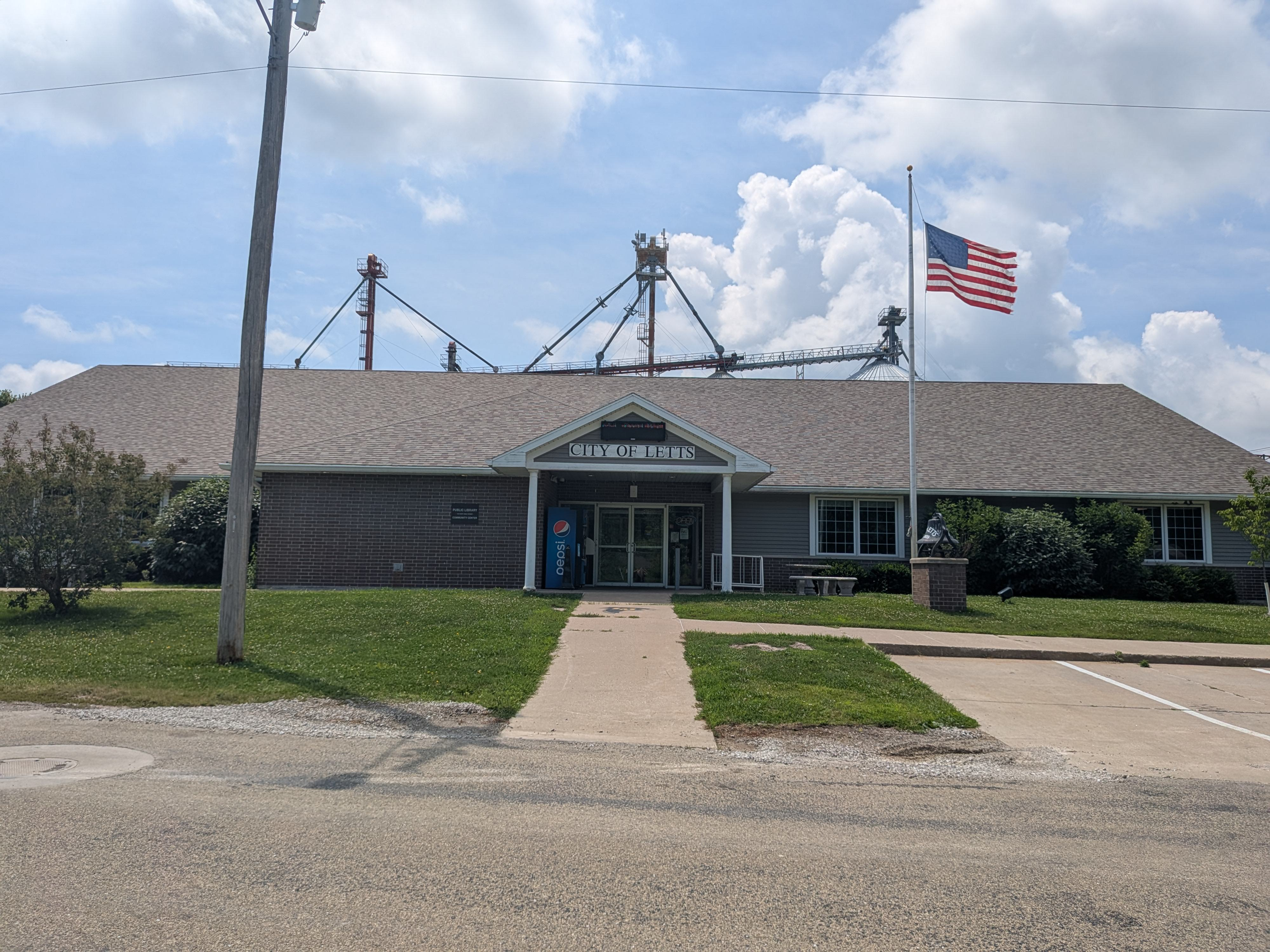
- Letts city hall, community center and library

- Location of Letts, Iowa
- Coordinates: 41°19′48″N 91°14′07″W
- Country: United States
- State: Iowa
- County: Louisa

Area
  - Total: 0.57 sq mi (1.47 km^{2})
  - Land: 0.57 sq mi (1.47 km^{2})
  - Water: 0 sq mi (0.00 km^{2})
- Elevation: 653 ft (199 m)

Population (2020)
  - Total: 363
  - Density: 640.6/sq mi (247.34/km^{2})
- Time zone: UTC-6 (Central (CST))
  - Summer (DST): UTC-5 (CDT)
- ZIP code: 52754
- Area code: 319
- FIPS code: 19-44715
- GNIS feature ID: 2395688
- Website: https://www.cityoflettsia.org/

Letts is a city in northern Louisa County, Iowa, United States, established in 1855. The population was 363 at the time of the 2020 census. It is part of the Muscatine Micropolitan Statistical Area. The name is taken from that of local benefactor, Nehemiah Madison Letts (b. 1818 Licking, Ohio – d. 1894 Grandview, Iowa).

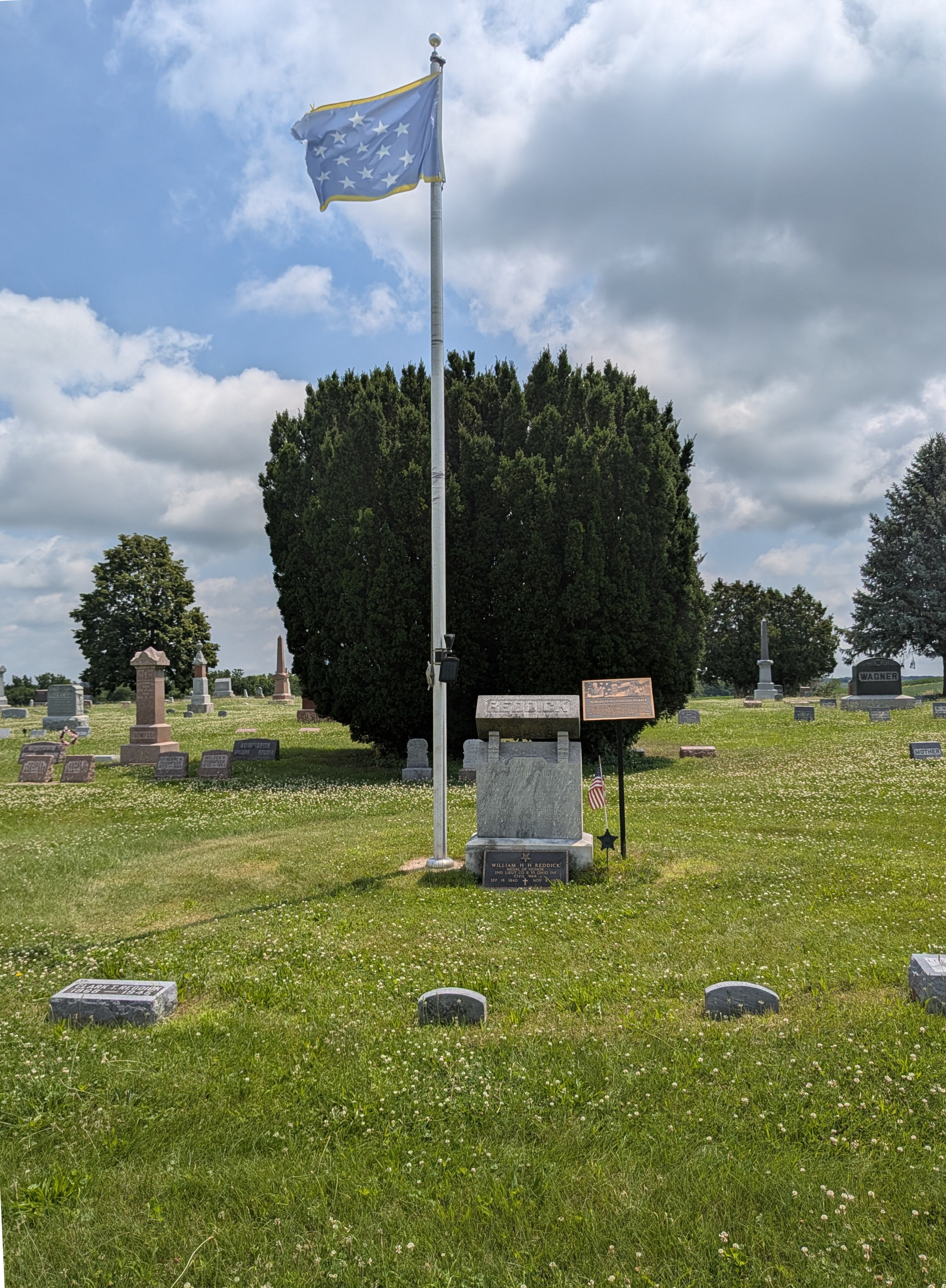
Grave of Medal of Honor recipient William H. Reddick in Letts

== Geography ==
Letts is located one-half mile south of the Louisa-Muscatine county line and two miles west of US Route 61.

According to the United States Census Bureau, the city has a total area of 0.59 square miles (1.53 km^{2}), all land.

== Demographics ==
Historical populations
Year	Pop.	±%
1870	88	—
1880	300	+240.9%
1890	325	+8.3%
1900	387	+19.1%
1910	433	+11.9%
1920	417	−3.7%
1930	329	−21.1%
1940	362	+10.0%
1950	404	+11.6%
1960	392	−3.0%
1970	434	+10.7%
1980	473	+9.0%
1990	390	−17.5%
2000	392	+0.5%
2010	384	−2.0%
2020	363	−5.5%
Source:"U.S. Census website". United States Census Bureau. and Iowa Data Center; Source: U.S. Decennial Census

=== 2020 census ===
As of the census of 2020, there were 363 people, 143 households, and 99 families residing in the city. The population density was 640.6 inhabitants per square mile (247.3/km^{2}). There were 148 housing units at an average density of 261.2 per square mile (100.8/km^{2}). The racial makeup of the city was 95.3% White, 0.0% Black or African American, 0.0% Native American, 0.3% Asian, 0.0% Pacific Islander, 0.0% from other races and 4.4% from two or more races. Hispanic or Latino persons of any race comprised 3.6% of the population.

Of the 143 households, 35.0% of which had children under the age of 18 living with them, 50.3% were married couples living together, 10.5% were cohabitating couples, 24.5% had a female householder with no spouse or partner present and 14.7% had a male householder with no spouse or partner present. 30.8% of all households were non-families. 23.8% of all households were made up of individuals, 14.0% had someone living alone who was 65 years old or older.

The median age in the city was 39.6 years. 25.9% of the residents were under the age of 20; 4.4% were between the ages of 20 and 24; 27.3% were from 25 and 44; 23.7% were from 45 and 64; and 18.7% were 65 years of age or older. The gender makeup of the city was 50.4% male and 49.6% female.

=== 2010 census ===
As of the census of 2010, there were 384 people, 148 households, and 110 families residing in the city. The population density was 650.8 inhabitants per square mile (251.3/km^{2}). There were 153 housing units at an average density of 259.3 per square mile (100.1/km^{2}). The racial makeup of the city was 94.8% White, 0.5% Native American, 1.8% Pacific Islander, 1.3% from other races, and 1.6% from two or more races. Hispanic or Latino of any race were 5.2% of the population.

There were 148 households, of which 37.2% had children under the age of 18 living with them, 56.8% were married couples living together, 14.9% had a female householder with no husband present, 2.7% had a male householder with no wife present, and 25.7% were non-families. 23.6% of all households were made up of individuals, and 11.5% had someone living alone who was 65 years of age or older. The average household size was 2.59 and the average family size was 3.05.

The median age in the city was 37.3 years. 26.6% of residents were under the age of 18; 8.3% were between the ages of 18 and 24; 22% were from 25 to 44; 28% were from 45 to 64; and 15.1% were 65 years of age or older. The gender makeup of the city was 51.0% male and 49.0% female.

=== 2000 census ===
As of the census of 2000, there were 392 people, 146 households, and 113 families residing in the city. The population density was 706.3 inhabitants per square mile (272.7/km^{2}). There were 151 housing units at an average density of 272.1 per square mile (105.1/km^{2}). The racial makeup of the city was 96.68% White, 0.51% African American, 1.02% Native American, 0.26% Asian, 0.77% from other races, and 0.77% from two or more races. Hispanic or Latino of any race were 3.06% of the population.

There were 146 households, out of which 38.4% had children under the age of 18 living with them, 61.0% were married couples living together, 9.6% had a female householder with no husband present, and 22.6% were non-families. 17.8% of all households were made up of individuals, and 7.5% had someone living alone who was 65 years of age or older. The average household size was 2.68 and the average family size was 3.04.

In the city, the population was spread out, with 28.6% under the age of 18, 8.7% from 18 to 24, 26.0% from 25 to 44, 23.0% from 45 to 64, and 13.8% who were 65 years of age or older. The median age was 37 years. For every 100 females, there were 99.0 males. For every 100 females age 18 and over, there were 93.1 males.

The median income for a household in the city was $37,188, and the median income for a family was $40,750. Males had a median income of $32,500 versus $19,375 for females. The per capita income for the city was $17,285. About 4.4% of families and 7.1% of the population were below the poverty line, including 8.0% of those under age 18 and none of those age 65 or over.

== Education ==
Louisa–Muscatine Community School District operates the area public schools for this municipality.

Some rural areas in proximity to Letts are zoned to the Muscatine Community School District. Muscatine High School is the district's high school.
