= Louisa–Muscatine Community School District =

Public school district in Louisa County, Iowa, United States

Coordinates: 41.306106°N 91.203546°W

Address
- 14354 170th St. Letts, Iowa, 52754; United States
- Coordinates: 41.306106, -91.203546

District information
- Type: Public
- Motto: "We are Louisa-Muscatine, where Falcons soar, school rocks, and character rules"
- Grades: PreK–12
- Established: 1959
- Superintendent: Anthony Ryan
- Schools: 2
- Budget: $12,184,000 (2021-2022)
- NCES District ID: 1917820
- Affiliations: (Boys' sports) IHSAA and (Girls' Sports) IGHSAU

Students and staff
- Students: 810 (2021-22)
- Teachers: 64.29 FTE
- Staff: 64.29 FTE
- Student–teacher ratio: 12.60
- Athletic conference: Southeast Iowa Superconference; North Division
- District mascot: Falcons, Ferd The Falcon
- Colors: Black & Gold

Other information
- Mission Statement: "We value, we challenge, we prepare each and every student"
- Rivalries: The FalCat Rivalry (formerly known as the battle for the graffiti barn) with Columbus Community The showdown on 61 with Wapello The Black & Gold Brawl with Lone Tree
- Website: www.louisa-muscatine.k12.ia.us

The Louisa–Muscatine Community School District is rural public school district consisting of an elementary school and a high school located in a single complex along U.S. Highway 61 in unincorporated Louisa County, Iowa, with a Letts postal address.

The district is named Louisa–Muscatine because it is on the border of Louisa and Muscatine counties.

The district, occupying sections of both counties, includes the cities of Letts, Grandview, and Fruitland as well as a portion of the city limits of Muscatine. It also includes Cranston, an unincorporated area, as well as students from various other local communities.

== History ==
Louisa-Muscatine Schools, also known as L-M, or L&M (L and M) and is located south of Muscatine, Iowa. The schools are surrounded by fields, and is right off of Highway 61.

The district was formed in 1959 as the consolidation of Letts High School and Grandview High School. Letts High School's mascot was the Comets and their colors were purple and gold. Grandview High School's mascot was the Greyhounds and their school colors where black and orange. The Black and Gold colors for the newly consolidated school took one color from each of the two former schools. The district serves Grandview, Letts, Fruitland, Cranston, and portions of Muscatine.

== Facilities ==
The campus is located south of Muscatine, Iowa and is three miles away from Letts.

The Jr./Sr. High School was built in 1963 and has had three additions and a major renovation. The Elementary School was opened in 1993.

=== Athletic Facilities ===
The athletic facilities at the campus include a Varsity Competition Gymnasium in the High School, an Auxiliary Gymnasium in the Elementary School, baseball and softball complex and an American football and track center. The American Football field is named after Richard F. Paine, the districts' first superintendent.

Louisa–Muscatine is involved in the School-to-Work (STW) initiative with Muscatine Community Schools and the Muscatine area business and industry.

== Athletics ==
The Falcons compete in the Southeast Iowa Superconference (North Division), in the following sports:

- Boys' & Girls' Cross country
- Girls' Volleyball
- Boys' & Girls' Wrestling
- Boys' & Girls' Basketball
- Boys' & Girls' Bowling
- Boys' & Girls' Track and field
- Boys' & Girls' Golf
- Boys' & Girls' Soccer (Co-op With Wapello)
- Boys' Baseball
- Girls' Softball

The Falcons send their athletes to Muscatine to compete in the Mississippi Athletic Conference (MAC) in the following sport(s):

- Boys' & Girls' Swimming and Diving
- Boys' & Girls' Tennis

For American Football, the Falcons compete in Iowa Class 1A District 6 (As of 2025).

== See also ==
- List of school districts in Iowa
- List of high schools in Iowa
