= Montpelier, Iowa =

- Census-designated place
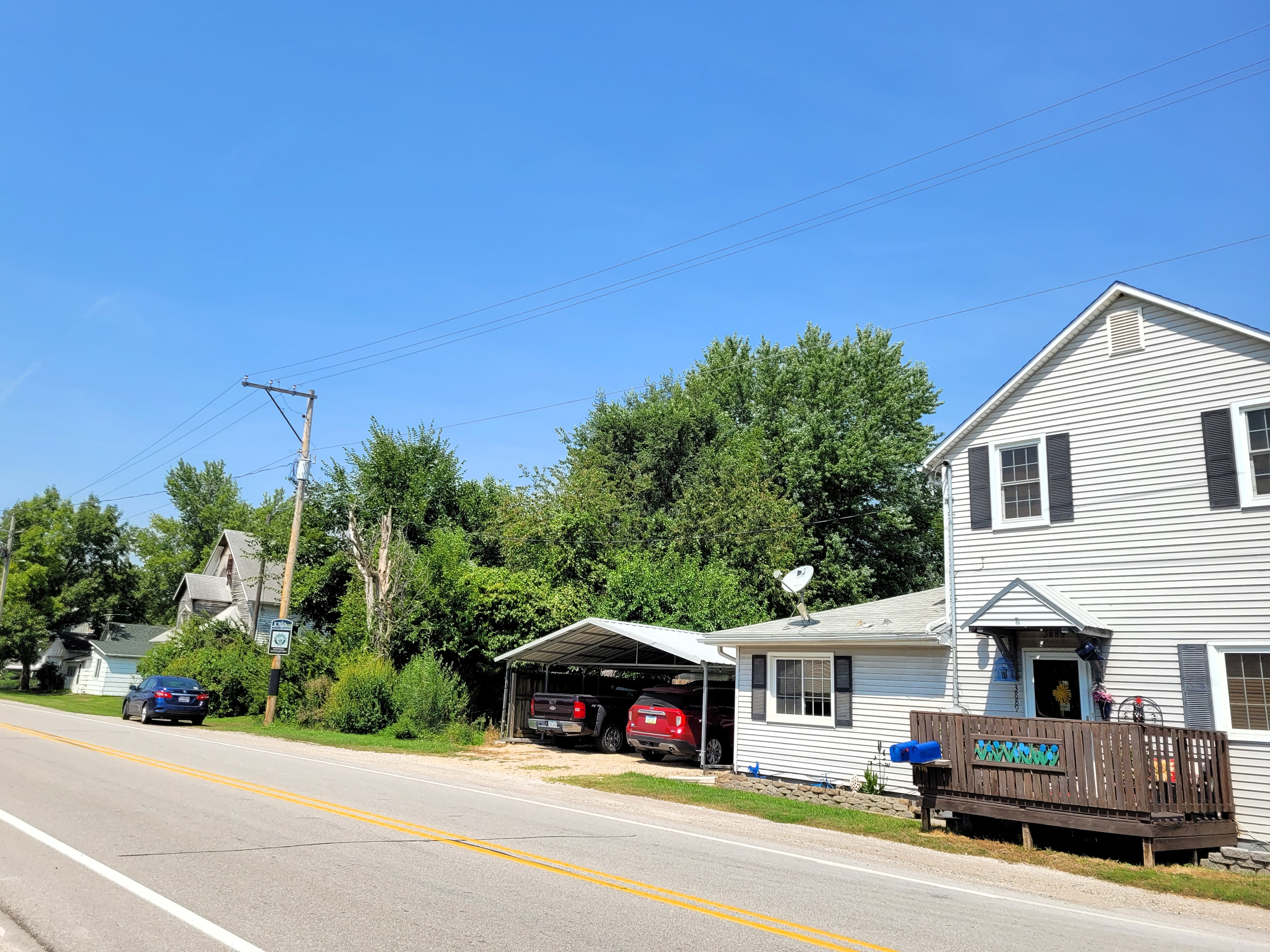
- 2nd Street in Montpelier in 2023

- Location within Iowa Location within the United States
- Coordinates: 41°27′41″N 90°48′41″W
- Country: United States
- State: Iowa
- County: Scott, Muscatine

Area
  - Total: 0.49 sq mi (1.27 km^{2})
  - Land: 0.49 sq mi (1.27 km^{2})
  - Water: 0 sq mi (0.00 km^{2})
- Elevation: 600 ft (180 m)

Population (2020)
  - Total: 186
  - Density: 379.5/sq mi (146.54/km^{2})
- Time zone: UTC-6 (Central (CST))
  - Summer (DST): UTC-5 (CDT)
- ZIP code: 52759
- Area code: 563
- FIPS code: 19-53715
- GNIS feature ID: 2806528

Montpelier is an unincorporated community and census-designated place (CDP) in Muscatine County, Iowa, United States. As of the 2020 census, the population was 186. The community is part of the Muscatine Micropolitan Statistical Area.

== History ==
The first settlers of Muscatine County were natives of Vermont, and they chose the name after the capital of that state, Montpelier.

Montpelier's post office was first established under the name of "Iowa" on April 19, 1836, changed to Montpelier on April 1, 1839, and discontinued on February 11, 1846. Although it was reestablished on February 28, 1882, it was finally discontinued on February 18, 1986, when it was attached to the Blue Grass post office. Although its post office is gone, Montpelier retains its own ZIP Code, 52759.

The population was 125 in 1940.

== Geography ==
Located along Iowa Highway 22, Montpelier lies on the Mississippi River 13 miles (21 km) east of (upriver from) the city of Muscatine, the county seat of Muscatine County. The city of Davenport is 17 miles (27 km) farther upriver.

According to the U.S. Census Bureau, the Montpelier CDP has an area of 0.49 square miles (1.3 km^{2}), all land.

== Demographics ==
Historical population
Census	Pop.	Note	%±
2020	186		—
U.S. Decennial Census

=== 2020 census ===
As of the census of 2020, there were 186 people, 87 households, and 59 families residing in the community. The population density was 379.5 inhabitants per square mile (146.5/km^{2}). There were 87 housing units at an average density of 177.5 per square mile (68.5/km^{2}). The racial makeup of the community was 85.5% White, 0.0% Black or African American, 0.0% Native American, 1.6% Asian, 0.0% Pacific Islander, 5.4% from other races and 7.5% from two or more races. Hispanic or Latino persons of any race comprised 10.2% of the population.

Of the 87 households, 20.7% of which had children under the age of 18 living with them, 57.5% were married couples living together, 12.6% were cohabitating couples, 13.8% had a female householder with no spouse or partner present and 16.1% had a male householder with no spouse or partner present. 32.2% of all households were non-families. 20.7% of all households were made up of individuals, 13.8% had someone living alone who was 65 years old or older.

The median age in the community was 47.8 years. 19.9% of the residents were under the age of 20; 1.6% were between the ages of 20 and 24; 25.3% were from 25 and 44; 28.5% were from 45 and 64; and 24.7% were 65 years of age or older. The gender makeup of the community was 50.0% male and 50.0% female.

== Education ==
Muscatine Community School District operates public schools serving the community. Muscatine High School is the district's high school.
