= Fairport, Iowa =

- Census-designated place
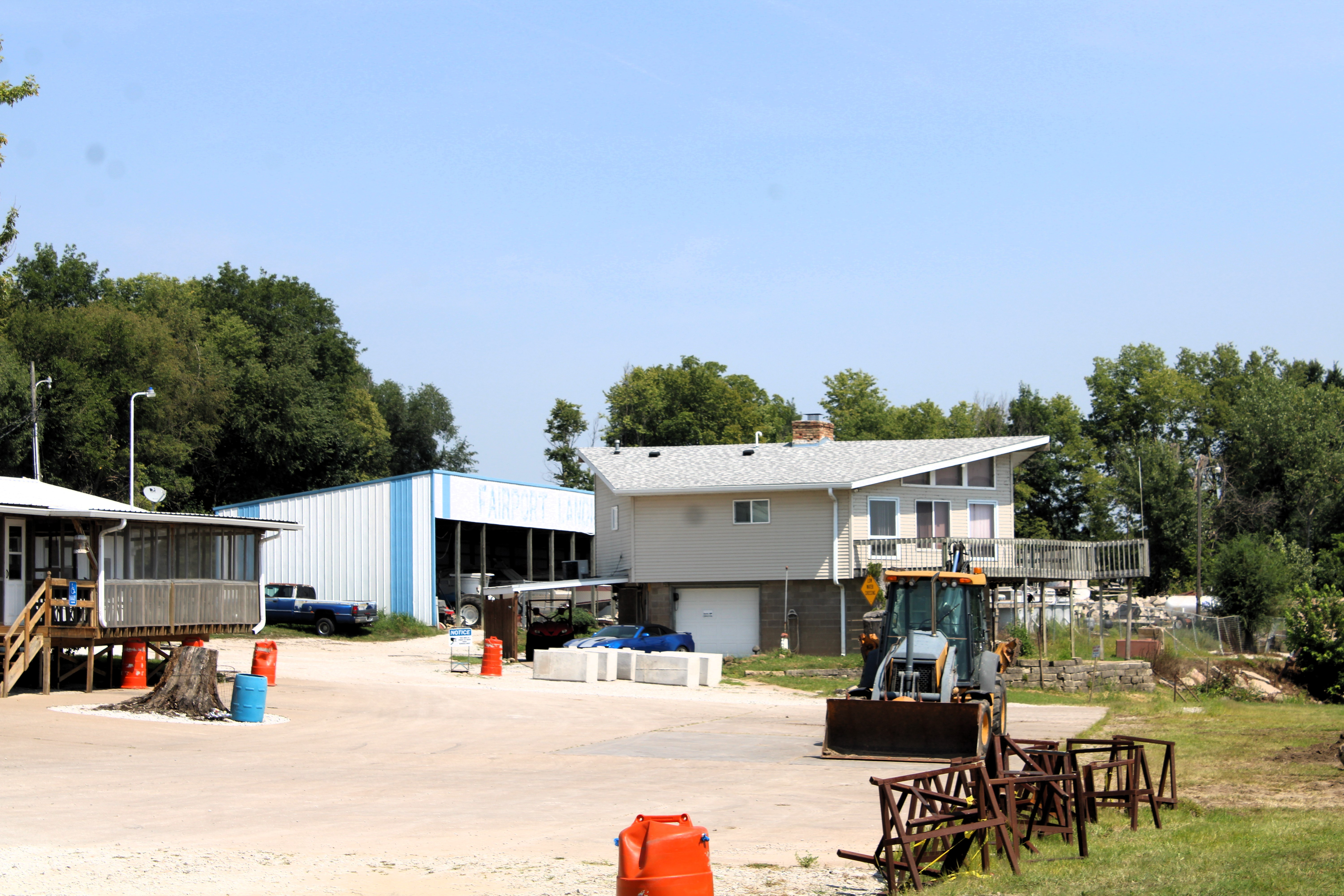
- Fairport Marina in 2023

- Location within Iowa Location within the United States
- Coordinates: 41°26′22″N 90°55′01″W
- Country: United States
- State: Iowa
- County: Muscatine

Area
  - Total: 1.89 sq mi (4.89 km^{2})
  - Land: 1.86 sq mi (4.82 km^{2})
  - Water: 0.027 sq mi (0.07 km^{2})
- Elevation: 712 ft (217 m)

Population (2020)
  - Total: 204
  - Density: 109.7/sq mi (42.34/km^{2})
- Time zone: UTC-6 (Central (CST))
  - Summer (DST): UTC-5 (CDT)
- ZIP code: 52761 (Muscatine)
- Area code: 563
- FIPS code: 19-26580
- GNIS feature ID: 2806487

Fairport is an unincorporated community and census-designated place (CDP) along the Mississippi River and Iowa Highway 22 in Muscatine County, Iowa, United States. As of the 2020 census, the population was 204.

== History ==
Fairport, originally called "Salem", was platted in 1839.

Fairport was once a stop along the Chicago, Rock Island and Pacific Railroad and along the Milwaukee Road.

The population was 150 in 1940.

== Geography ==
Fairport is in eastern Muscatine County, on the north bank of the Mississippi River. The community extends north to include the tops of the bluffs overlooking the river. Iowa Highway 22 passes through the community, leading west 8 miles (13 km) to Muscatine, the county seat, and east 20 miles (32 km) to Davenport.

== Demographics ==
Historical population
Census	Pop.	Note	%±
2020	204		—
U.S. Decennial Census

=== 2020 census ===
As of the census of 2020, there were 204 people, 89 households, and 71 families residing in the community. The population density was 109.7 inhabitants per square mile (42.3/km^{2}). There were 108 housing units at an average density of 58.1 per square mile (22.4/km^{2}). The racial makeup of the community was 89.2% White, 0.0% Black or African American, 0.0% Native American, 2.9% Asian, 0.0% Pacific Islander, 0.0% from other races and 7.8% from two or more races. Hispanic or Latino persons of any race comprised 2.9% of the population.

Of the 89 households, 31.5% of which had children under the age of 18 living with them, 75.3% were married couples living together, 2.2% were cohabitating couples, 5.6% had a female householder with no spouse or partner present and 16.9% had a male householder with no spouse or partner present. 20.2% of all households were non-families. 19.1% of all households were made up of individuals, 12.4% had someone living alone who was 65 years old or older.

The median age in the community was 54.3 years. 17.2% of the residents were under the age of 20; 0.5% were between the ages of 20 and 24; 15.2% were from 25 and 44; 40.7% were from 45 and 64; and 26.5% were 65 years of age or older. The gender makeup of the community was 49.5% male and 50.5% female.

== Education ==
Muscatine Community School District operates public schools serving the community. Muscatine High School is the district's high school.
