= Cranston, Iowa =

- Unincorporated community
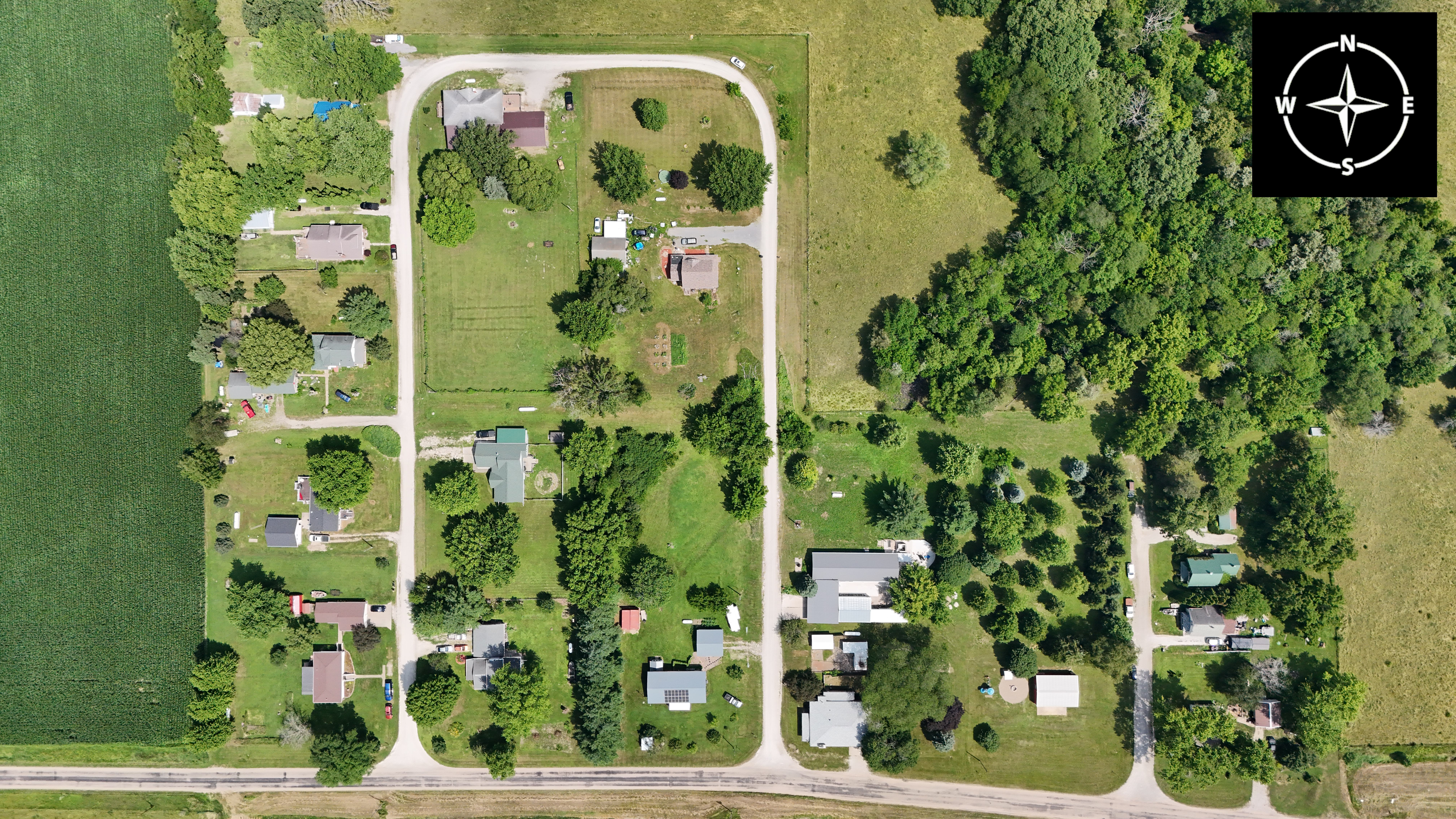
- An aerial view of Cranston, taken on July 7, 2025

- Location within Iowa Location within the United States
- Coordinates: 41°22′45″N 91°15′41″W
- Country: United States
- State: Iowa
- County: Muscatine
- Elevation: 666 ft (203 m)
- Time zone: UTC-6 (Central (CST))
  - Summer (DST): UTC-5 (CDT)
- GNIS feature ID: 455702

Cranston is an unincorporated community in Muscatine County, Iowa, United States.

== Geography ==
Cranston is located near the junction of Cranston Road and 250th Street, in Orono Township.

== History ==
Cranston was a stop on the Milwaukee Road, which was removed in 1982, although little remains of the community today. Cranston's population was 42 in 1925. The population was 53 in 1940.

There are thirteen houses remaining in Cranston. The Cranston graveyard, containing predominantly Protestant graves, is a half mile east of the town.

== Education ==
Cranston residents are zoned to schools of the Louisa–Muscatine Community School District.
