= Grandview, Iowa =

- City
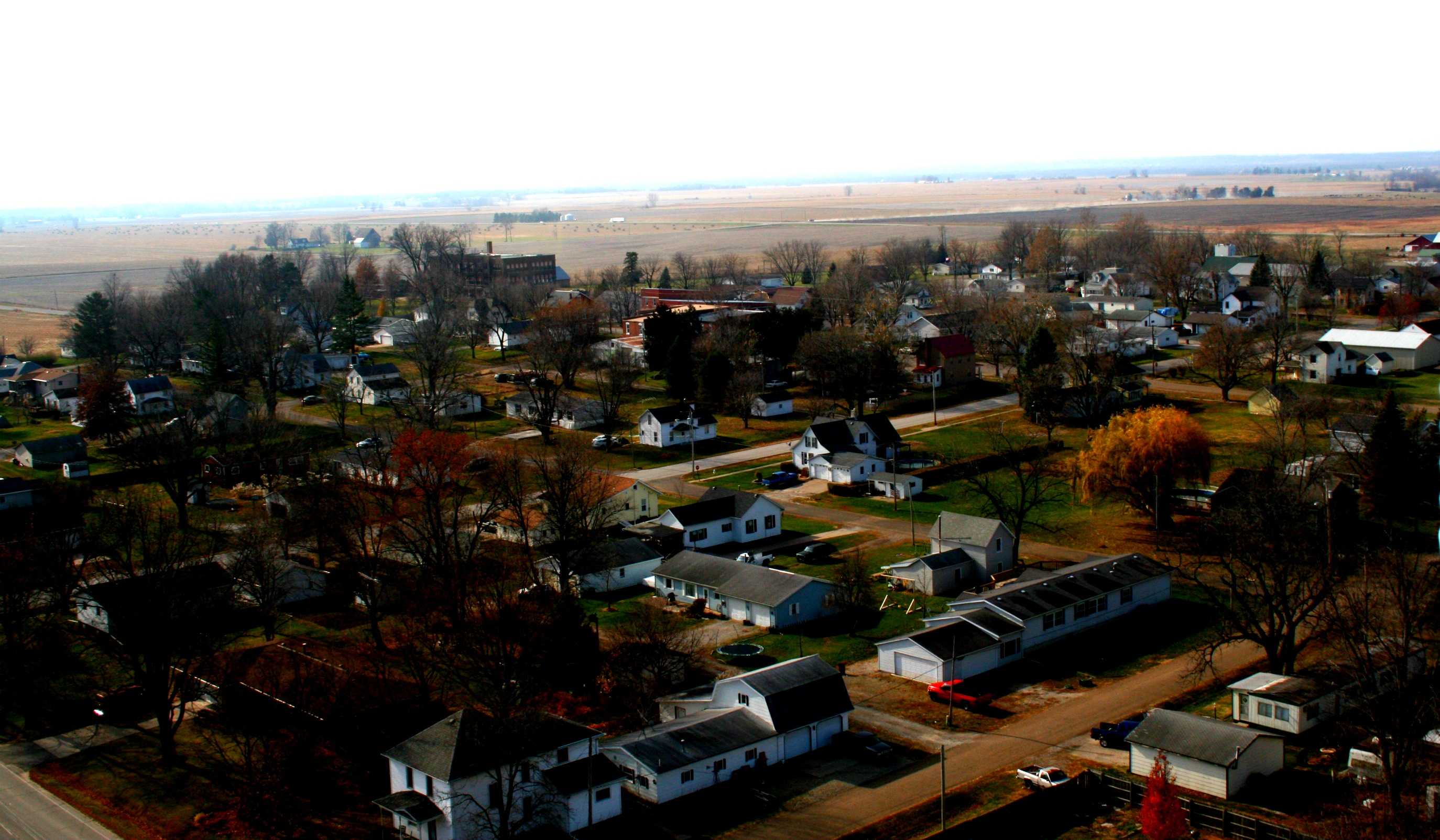
- Viewing southwest in Grandview

- Location of Grandview, Iowa
- Coordinates: 41°16′38″N 91°11′17″W
- Country: United States
- State: Iowa
- County: Louisa

Area
  - Total: 0.23 sq mi (0.59 km^{2})
  - Land: 0.23 sq mi (0.59 km^{2})
  - Water: 0 sq mi (0.00 km^{2})
- Elevation: 702 ft (214 m)

Population (2020)
  - Total: 437
  - Density: 1,915.4/sq mi (739.54/km^{2})
- Time zone: UTC-6 (Central (CST))
  - Summer (DST): UTC-5 (CDT)
- ZIP code: 52752
- Area code: 319
- FIPS code: 19-32115
- GNIS feature ID: 2394957

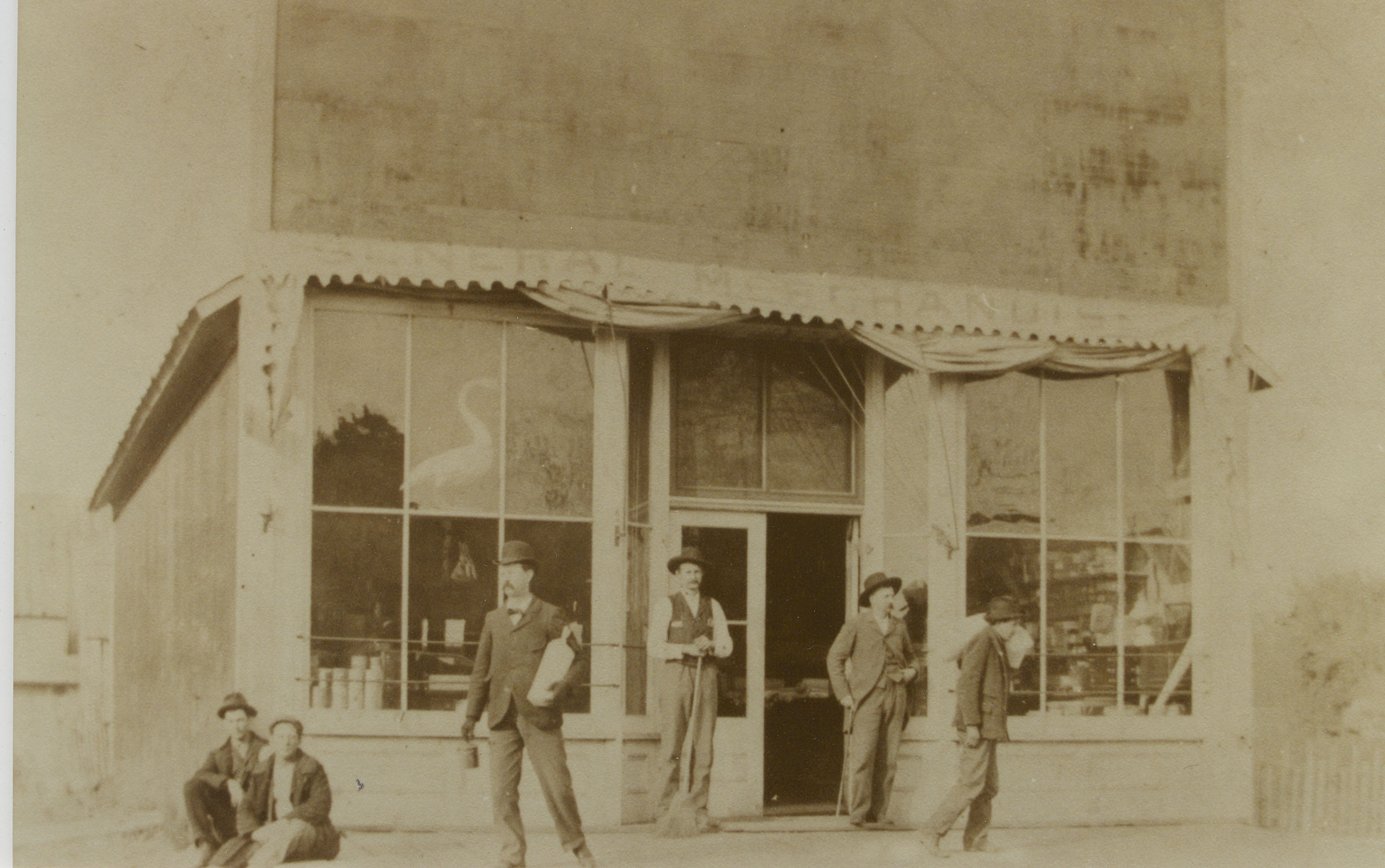
Ferrie Gast General Store

Grandview is a city in Louisa County, Iowa, United States. The population was 437 at the time of the 2020 census. It is part of the Muscatine Micropolitan Statistical Area.

== History ==
Grandview was laid out in 1841 by Alvin Clark and Robert Childers.

Grandview was seriously affected by an EF3 tornado on June 1, 2007, which damaged or destroyed dozens of houses and impacted other parts of the city.

== Geography ==
Grandview is located one half mile east of the junction of US Route 61 and Iowa Highway 92. Wapello is six miles to the south and Muscatine is approximately 12 miles to the northeast.

According to the United States Census Bureau, the city has a total area of 0.23 square miles (0.60 km^{2}), all land.

== Demographics ==
Historical populations
Year	Pop.	±%
1910	374	—
1920	341	−8.8%
1930	321	−5.9%
1940	315	−1.9%
1950	311	−1.3%
1960	300	−3.5%
1970	357	+19.0%
1980	473	+32.5%
1990	514	+8.7%
2000	600	+16.7%
2010	556	−7.3%
2020	437	−21.4%
Source:"U.S. Census website". United States Census Bureau. and Iowa Data Center; Source: U.S. Decennial Census

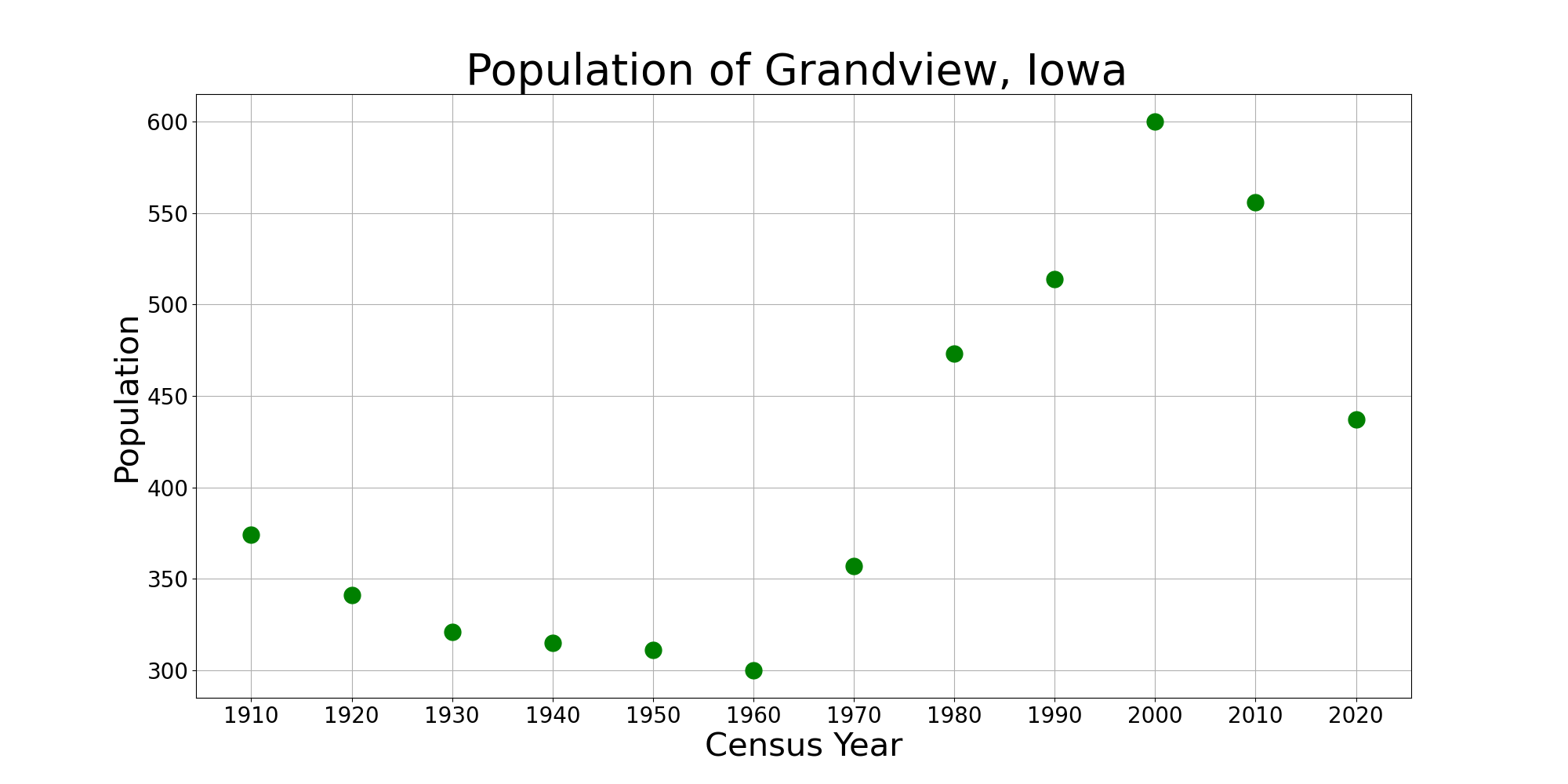
The population of Grandview, Iowa from US census data

=== 2020 census ===
As of the census of 2020, there were 437 people, 186 households, and 109 families residing in the city. The population density was 1,915.4 inhabitants per square mile (739.5/km^{2}). There were 199 housing units at an average density of 872.2 per square mile (336.8/km^{2}). The racial makeup of the city was 89.5% White, 1.4% Black or African American, 0.2% Native American, 0.2% Asian, 0.0% Pacific Islander, 3.4% from other races and 5.3% from two or more races. Hispanic or Latino persons of any race comprised 10.3% of the population.

Of the 186 households, 31.2% of which had children under the age of 18 living with them, 45.2% were married couples living together, 12.4% were cohabitating couples, 19.9% had a female householder with no spouse or partner present and 22.6% had a male householder with no spouse or partner present. 41.4% of all households were non-families. 32.3% of all households were made up of individuals, 17.2% had someone living alone who was 65 years old or older.

The median age in the city was 42.9 years. 26.1% of the residents were under the age of 20; 4.1% were between the ages of 20 and 24; 22.4% were from 25 and 44; 29.1% were from 45 and 64; and 18.3% were 65 years of age or older. The gender makeup of the city was 51.0% male and 49.0% female.

=== 2010 census ===
As of the census of 2010, there were 556 people, 207 households, and 154 families living in the city. The population density was 2,417.4 inhabitants per square mile (933.4/km^{2}). There were 233 housing units at an average density of 1,013.0 per square mile (391.1/km^{2}). The racial makeup of the city was 92.3% White, 0.9% African American, 0.2% Native American, 0.9% Asian, 4.0% from other races, and 1.8% from two or more races. Hispanic or Latino of any race were 8.5% of the population.

There were 207 households, of which 40.6% had children under the age of 18 living with them, 51.7% were married couples living together, 16.4% had a female householder with no husband present, 6.3% had a male householder with no wife present, and 25.6% were non-families. 19.3% of all households were made up of individuals, and 8.7% had someone living alone who was 65 years of age or older. The average household size was 2.69 and the average family size was 2.97.

The median age in the city was 34.4 years. 28.4% of residents were under the age of 18; 7.9% were between the ages of 18 and 24; 26.8% were from 25 to 44; 26% were from 45 to 64; and 11% were 65 years of age or older. The gender makeup of the city was 47.3% male and 52.7% female.

=== 2000 census ===
As of the census of 2000, there were 600 people, 204 households, and 157 families living in the city. The population density was 3,093.0 inhabitants per square mile (1,194.2/km^{2}). There were 216 housing units at an average density of 1,113.5 per square mile (429.9/km^{2}). The racial makeup of the city was 92.83% White, 0.50% African American, 0.17% Native American, 1.00% Asian, 0.50% Pacific Islander, 4.00% from other races, and 1.00% from two or more races. Hispanic or Latino of any race were 7.33% of the population.

There were 204 households, out of which 44.1% had children under the age of 18 living with them, 58.3% were married couples living together, 14.7% had a female householder with no husband present, and 23.0% were non-families. 18.6% of all households were made up of individuals, and 7.8% had someone living alone who was 65 years of age or older. The average household size was 2.94 and the average family size was 3.28.

32.0% were under the age of 18, 9.3% from 18 to 24, 30.0% from 25 to 44, 18.7% from 45 to 64, and 10.0% were 65 years of age or older. The median age was 33 years. For every 100 females, there were 89.3 males. For every 100 females age 18 and over, there were 88.0 males.

The median income for a household in the city was $37,625, and the median income for a family was $38,500. Males had a median income of $35,682 versus $20,417 for females. The per capita income for the city was $17,152. About 7.5% of families and 10.1% of the population were below the poverty line, including 9.5% of those under age 18 and 11.1% of those age 65 or over.

== Education ==
Louisa–Muscatine Community School District operates the area public schools for this municipality.

== Notable people ==
- Murray Wier (1926-2016), University of Iowa basketball star, NBA player
