= Nebergall "Knoll Crest" Round Barn =

- U.S. National Register of Historic Places
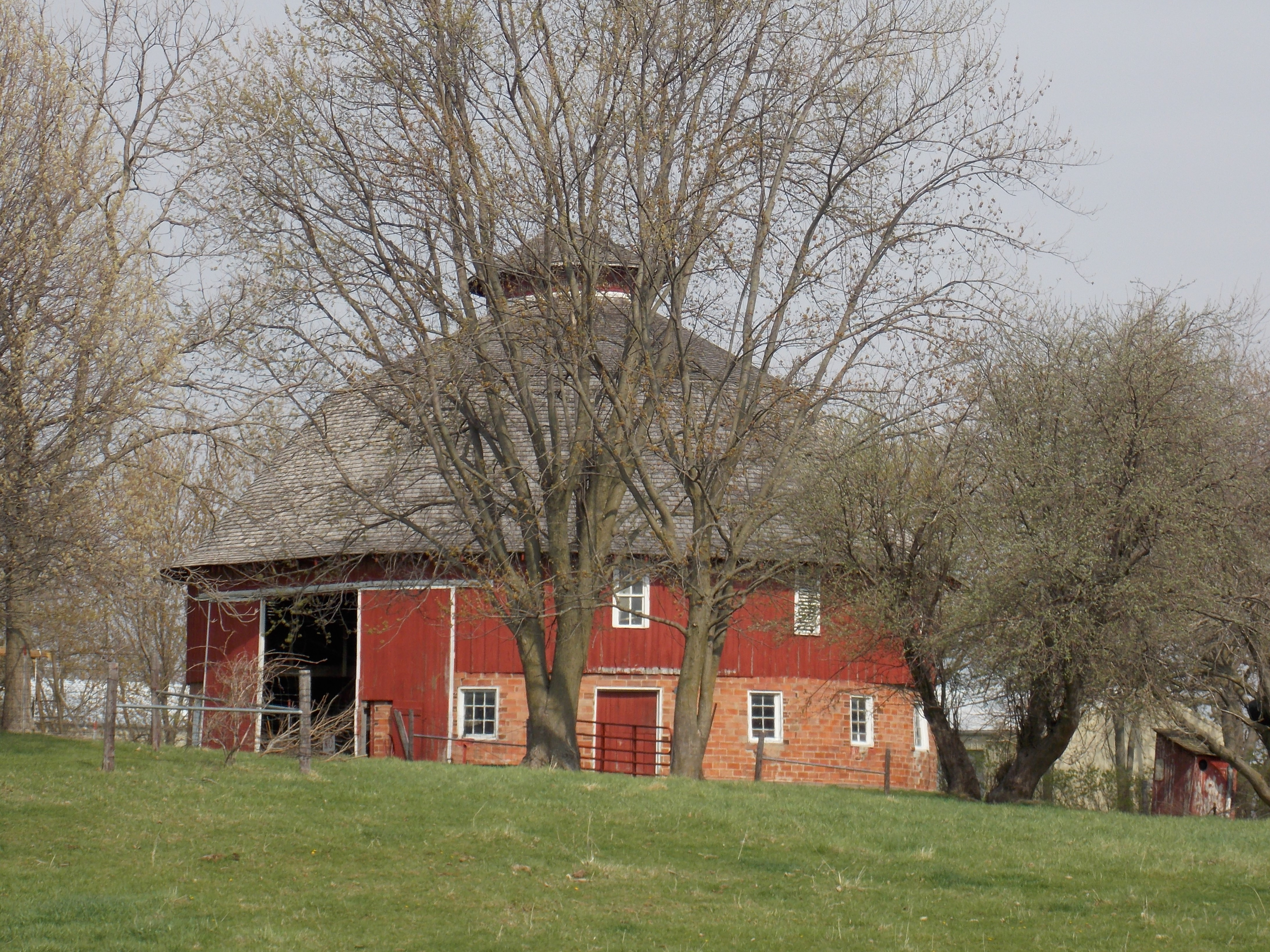

- Location within Iowa Location within the United States
- Location: Telegraph Road
- Nearest city: Blue Grass, Iowa
- Coordinates: 41°30′59″N 90°42′54″W
- Area: less than one acre
- Built: 1914
- Architect: Benton Steele
- MPS: Iowa Round Barns: The Sixty Year Experiment TR
- NRHP reference No.: 86001473
- Added to NRHP: June 30, 1986

The Nebergall "Knoll Crest" Round Barn is located between Davenport and Blue Grass in rural Scott County, Iowa, United States. It was built in 1914, and has been listed on the National Register of Historic Places since 1986.

== Architecture ==
Charles W. Nebergall owned Knoll Crest Farm when they contracted with Benton Steele to design and construct a round barn in 1914. The building is a true round barn that measures 56 feet (17 m) around. The bottom half of the barn is constructed of clay tile and features square windows. Red vertical board-and-batten siding covers the upper half of the barn that features rectangular windows. A driveway divides the interior circular arrangement between the horse stalls and the cattle stanchions, which ringed the outer perimeter of the main level. Grain bins and feedways are located between the animals and the center drive. Separate hay chutes serviced the horse and cattle sides of the barn. In that way, the horse hay and the cattle hay could be efficiently stored and the animals fed. There is no silo built into this barn. A cupola rests on top of a 2-pitch conical roof. The Nebergall family sold the farm in 1992 to John Penne. He re-roofed the barn in 1998 with wood shingles. The hayforks and manure track system remain in working condition.

== Benton Steele ==
The barn was built by Benton Steele, who was a specialized builder/architect. He built his first barns in the dairy districts of Indiana and Wisconsin before moving to Iowa, Nebraska, and Kansas. He wrote articles in publications such as the Kimball's Dairy Farmer of Waterloo, the Breeder's Gazette of Chicago, and the Hoard's Dairyman of Fort Atkinson, Wisconsin as a way to advertise his work. The Nebergall Round Barn is the only known example of a round barn from his work left in Iowa.
