= Blue Grass, Iowa =

- City
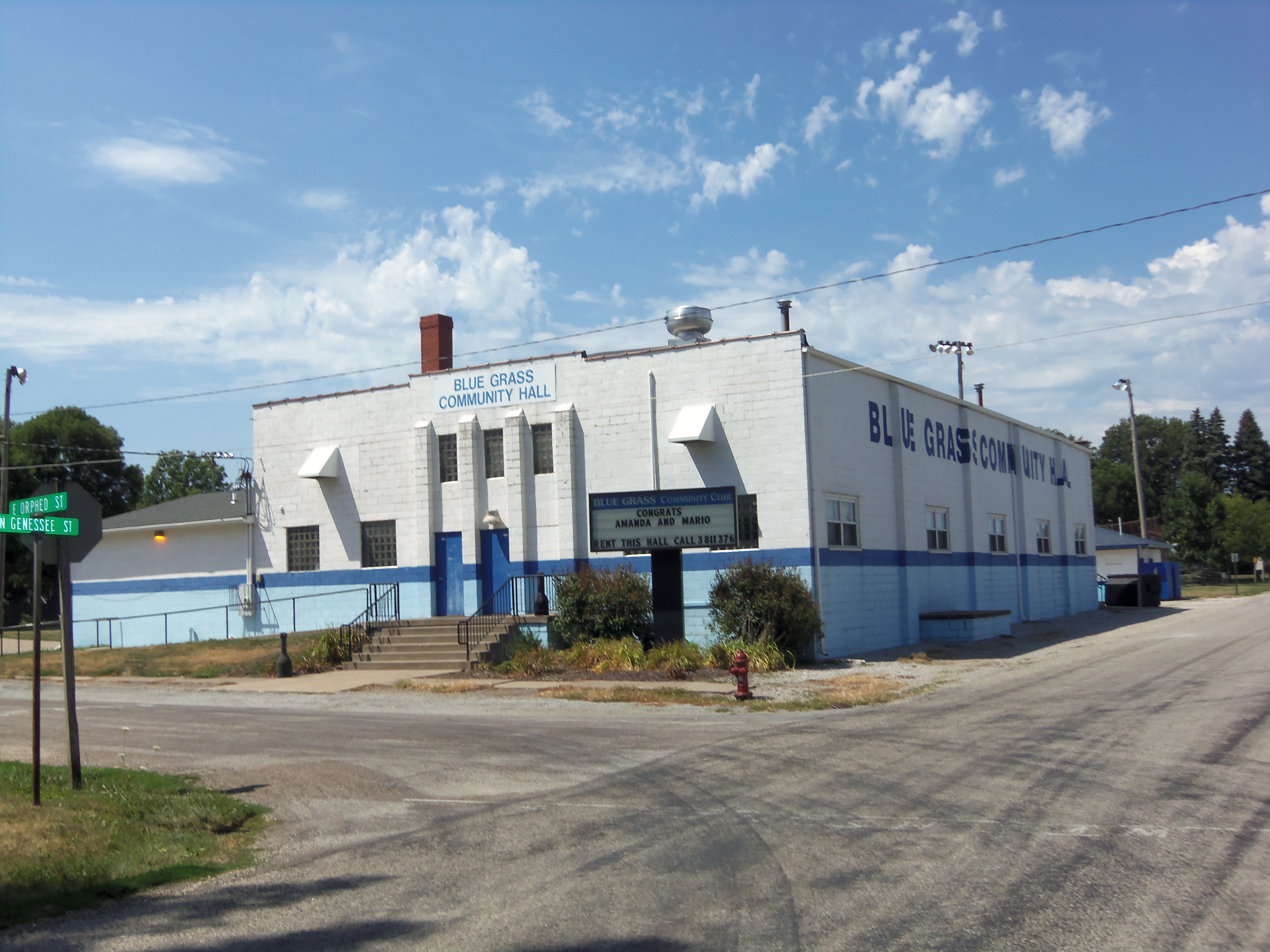
- Blue Grass Community Center
- Motto: A Great Place To Call Home Since 1853
- Location of Blue Grass, Iowa
- Coordinates: 41°30′26″N 90°45′40″W
- Country: United States
- State: Iowa
- Counties: Muscatine, Scott

Government
  - Mayor: Brad Schutte

Area
  - City: 3.16 sq mi (8.18 km^{2})
  - Land: 3.16 sq mi (8.18 km^{2})
  - Water: 0 sq mi (0.00 km^{2})
- Elevation: 797 ft (243 m)

Population (2020)
  - City: 1,666
  - Density: 527.2/sq mi (203.56/km^{2})
  - Metro: 382,630 (135th)
- Time zone: UTC-6 (Central (CST))
  - Summer (DST): UTC-5 (CDT)
- ZIP code: 52726
- Area code: 563
- FIPS code: 19-07075
- GNIS feature ID: 2394201
- Website: www.bluegrassia.org

Blue Grass is a city in Muscatine and Scott counties in the U.S. state of Iowa. The population was 1,666 as of 2020.

Most of Blue Grass is part of the Davenport–Moline–Rock Island, IA-IL Metropolitan Statistical Area, but the Muscatine County portion of the city is considered part of the Muscatine Micropolitan Statistical Area.

== Geography ==
According to the United States Census Bureau, the city has a total area of 2.89 square miles (7.49 km^{2}), all land.

== Demographics ==
Historical populations
Year	Pop.	±%
1880	70	—
1910	223	+218.6%
1920	205	−8.1%
1930	246	+20.0%
1940	287	+16.7%
1950	337	+17.4%
1960	568	+68.5%
1970	1,032	+81.7%
1980	1,377	+33.4%
1990	1,214	−11.8%
2000	1,169	−3.7%
2010	1,452	+24.2%
2020	1,666	+14.7%
Source:"U.S. Census website". United States Census Bureau. and Iowa Data Center; Source: U.S. Decennial Census

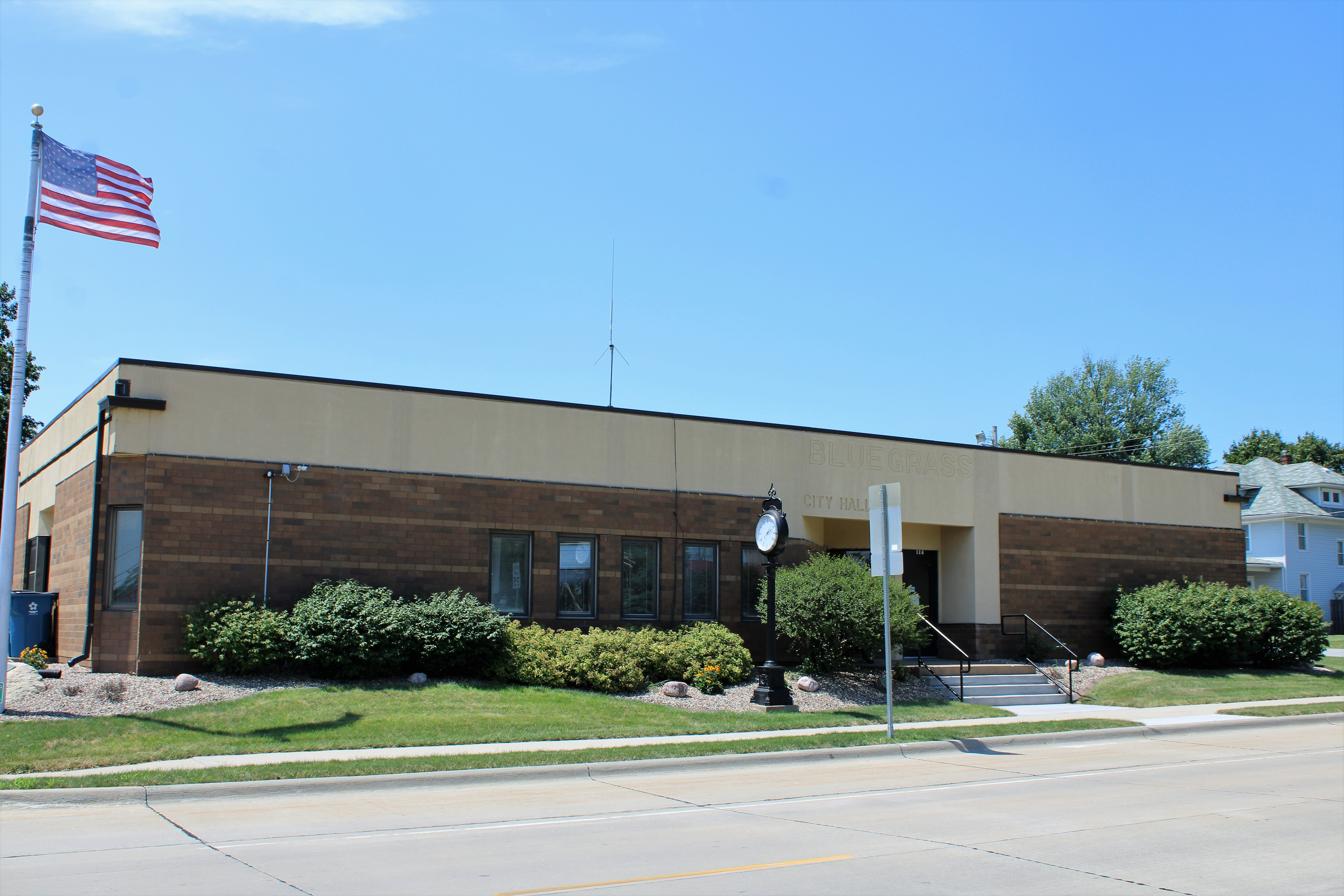
Blue Grass City Hall

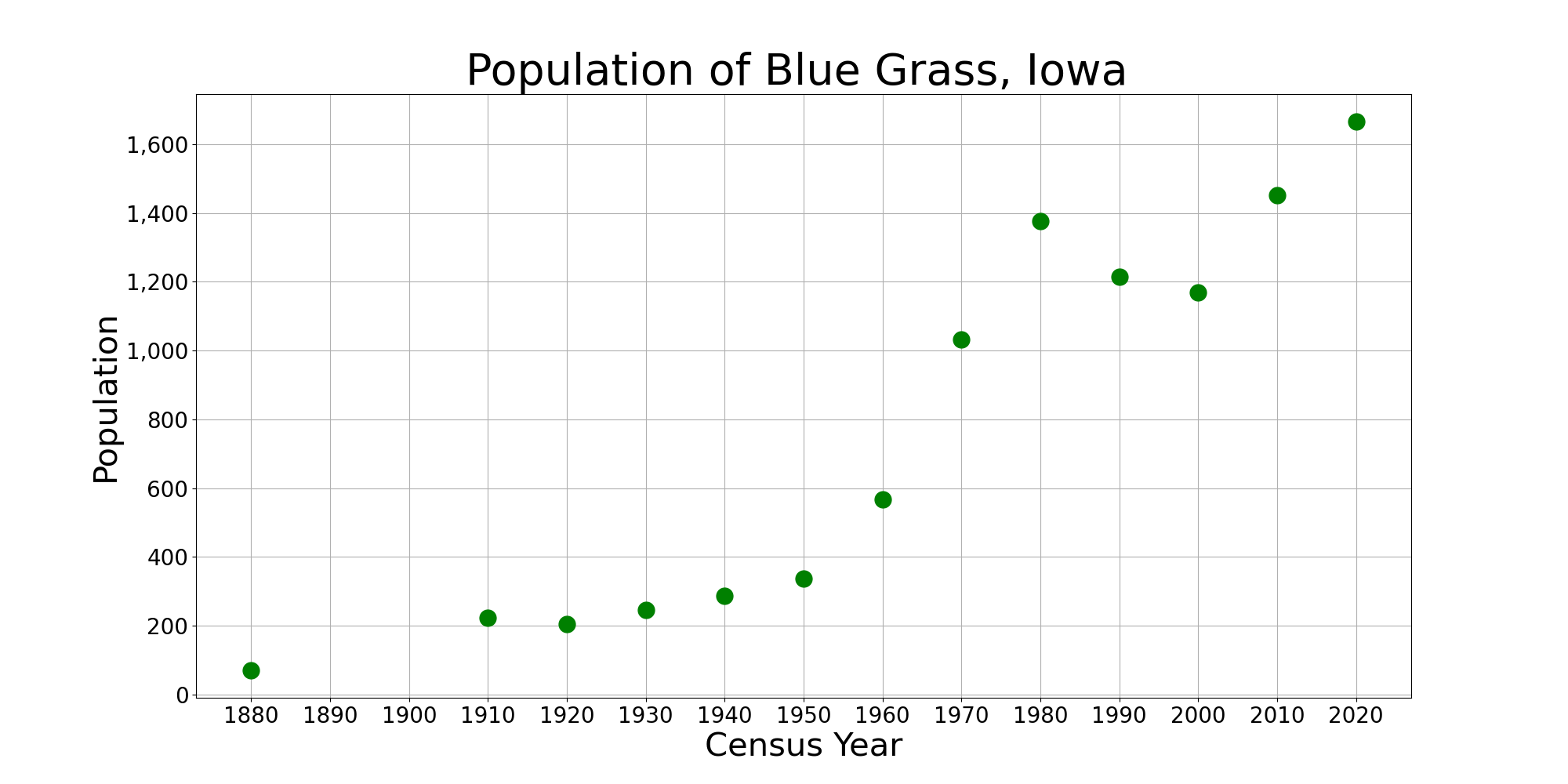
The population of Blue Grass, Iowa from US census data

=== 2020 census ===
As of the 2020 census, Blue Grass had a population of 1,666, with 669 households and 490 families. The median age was 41.9 years. 21.5% of residents were under the age of 18, 23.6% were under the age of 20, and 20.2% were 65 years of age or older. 4.8% were between the ages of 20 and 24, 25.1% were from 25 to 44, and 26.3% were from 45 to 64. For every 100 females there were 101.2 males, and for every 100 females age 18 and over there were 99.2 males age 18 and over. The gender makeup of the city was 50.3% male and 49.7% female.

0.0% of residents lived in urban areas, while 100.0% lived in rural areas.

Of the 669 households, 29.9% had children under the age of 18 living in them. 58.9% were married-couple households, 8.7% were cohabiting-couple households, 14.5% were households with a male householder and no spouse or partner present, and 17.9% were households with a female householder and no spouse or partner present. 26.8% of all households were non-families, 20.0% were made up of individuals, and 9.4% had someone living alone who was 65 years of age or older.

There were 690 housing units, of which 3.0% were vacant. The homeowner vacancy rate was 0.5% and the rental vacancy rate was 3.1%. The population density was 527.8 inhabitants per square mile (203.8/km^{2}), and the housing unit density was 218.6 per square mile (84.4/km^{2}).

Racial composition as of the 2020 census
Race	Number	Percent
White	1,567	94.1%
Black or African American	15	0.9%
American Indian and Alaska Native	2	0.1%
Asian	4	0.2%
Native Hawaiian and Other Pacific Islander	0	0.0%
Some other race	5	0.3%
Two or more races	73	4.4%
Hispanic or Latino (of any race)	55	3.3%

=== 2010 census ===
As of the census of 2010, there were 1,452 people, 561 households, and 426 families living in the city. The population density was 502.4 inhabitants per square mile (194.0/km^{2}). There were 597 housing units at an average density of 206.6 per square mile (79.8/km^{2}). The racial makeup of the city was 97.0% White, 1.2% African American, 0.4% Native American, 0.2% Asian, 0.1% from other races, and 1.0% from two or more races. Hispanic or Latino of any race were 1.8% of the population.

There were 561 households, of which 34.8% had children under the age of 18 living with them, 62.9% were married couples living together, 6.4% had a female householder with no husband present, 6.6% had a male householder with no wife present, and 24.1% were non-families. 20.0% of all households were made up of individuals, and 7.7% had someone living alone who was 65 years of age or older. The average household size was 2.59 and the average family size was 2.93.

The median age in the city was 39.4 years. 24.7% of residents were under the age of 18; 6.7% were between the ages of 18 and 24; 26.3% were from 25 to 44; 28% were from 45 to 64; and 14% were 65 years of age or older. The gender makeup of the city was 51.9% male and 48.1% female.

=== 2000 census ===
As of the census of 2000, there were 1,169 people, 443 households, and 348 families living in the city. The population density was 434.0 inhabitants per square mile (167.6/km^{2}). There were 459 housing units at an average density of 170.4 per square mile (65.8/km^{2}). The racial makeup of the city was 97.43% White, 0.26% African American, 0.26% Native American, 0.26% Asian, 0.94% from other races, and 0.86% from two or more races. Hispanic or Latino of any race were 1.80% of the population.

There were 443 households, out of which 35.0% had children under the age of 18 living with them, 62.5% were married couples living together, 12.2% had a female householder with no husband present, and 21.4% were non-families. 16.9% of all households were made up of individuals, and 6.1% had someone living alone who was 65 years of age or older. The average household size was 2.64 and the average family size was 2.95.

Age spread: 25.1% under the age of 18, 8.0% from 18 to 24, 29.9% from 25 to 44, 27.4% from 45 to 64, and 9.7% who were 65 years of age or older. The median age was 37 years. For every 100 females, there were 95.5 males. For every 100 females age 18 and over, there were 95.5 males.

The median income for a household in the city was $51,923, and the median income for a family was $55,208. Males had a median income of $37,135 versus $22,350 for females. The per capita income for the city was $20,811. About 3.8% of families and 4.9% of the population were below the poverty line, including 5.7% of those under age 18 and 4.3% of those age 65 or over.

== Education ==
Residents of the city are zoned to the Davenport Community School District. Zoned schools include Blue Grass Elementary School, Walcott Intermediate School, and Davenport West High School.

Muscatine Community School District operates public schools serving nearby rural areas. Muscatine High School is the district's high school.

== See also ==
- Nebergall "Knoll Crest" Round Barn, situated east of town along Telegraph Rd. (145th St.) and listed on the National Register of Historic Places in Scott County, Iowa
