= U.S. Route 61 =

Highway in the United States

U.S. Route 61
- US 61 highlighted in red

Route information
- Length: 1,406.99 mi (2,264.33 km)
- Existed: 1926–present

Major junctions
- South end: US 90 in New Orleans, LA
- I-10 in New Orleans, LA; US 51 in LaPlace, LA; I-20 / US 80 in Vicksburg, MS; I-55 / US 64 / US 70 / US 78 / US 79 in Memphis, TN; I-40 in West Memphis, AR; I-44 in St. Louis, MO; I-64 / I-70 / US 40 in Wentzville, MO; I-80 in Davenport, IA; I-90 in La Crescent, MN; I-94 / US 10 / US 12 in Saint Paul, MN
- North end: I-35 in Wyoming, MN

Location
- Country: United States
- States: Louisiana, Mississippi, Tennessee, Arkansas, Missouri, Iowa, Wisconsin, Minnesota

Highway system
- United States Numbered Highway System; List; Special; Divided
← US 60	→ US 62

U.S. Route 61 or U.S. Highway 61 (U.S. 61) is a major United States highway that extends 1,400 miles (2,300 km) between New Orleans, Louisiana and the city of Wyoming, Minnesota. The highway generally follows the course of the Mississippi River and is designated the Great River Road for much of its route. As of 2004, the highway's northern terminus in Wyoming, Minnesota, is at an intersection with Interstate 35 (I-35). Until 1991, the highway extended north on what is now Minnesota State Highway 61 (MN 61) through Duluth to the Canada–U.S. border near Grand Portage, then continued to Thunder Bay, Canada, as Ontario Highway 61. Its southern terminus in New Orleans is at an intersection with U.S. Route 90 (US 90). The route was an important south–north connection in the days before the interstate highway system.

The highway is often called the Blues Highway because of its long history in blues music; part of the route lies on the Mississippi Blues Trail and is denoted by markers in Vicksburg and Tunica. It is also the subject of numerous musical works, with the route inspiring the album Highway 61 Revisited by Bob Dylan.

== Route description ==
=== Louisiana ===
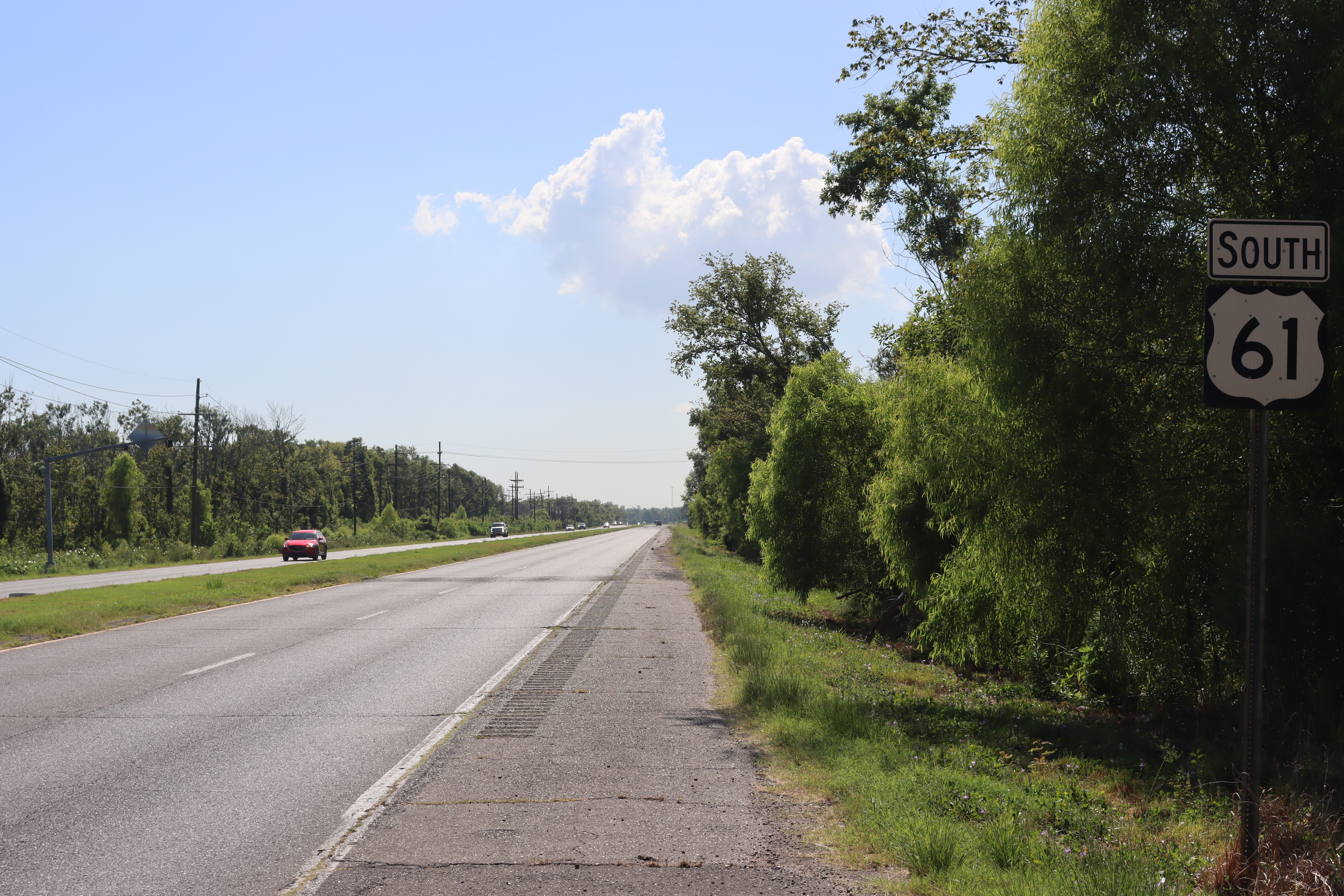
US 61 (Airline Highway) southbound near Gramercy, Louisiana

US 61 in Louisiana is four-laned from its southern terminus in New Orleans to the Mississippi state line, where the highway continues to Natchez as a four-lane highway.

The section of US 61 from the Jefferson/Orleans Parish border to Baton Rouge is known as the Airline Highway. Although the road fronts the former terminal of Louis Armstrong New Orleans International Airport and passes near Baton Rouge Metropolitan Airport, the name originally referred to the highway's straight route in contrast to that of the winding Jefferson Highway, which often paralleled the Mississippi River. Legend has it that former Louisiana Governor Huey Long advocated the construction of the "airline" highway to provide him with a quick means of access from the capitol building in Baton Rouge to the bars and other pleasure establishments in New Orleans. On Airline Highway in Jefferson Parish in 1987, Baton Rouge televangelist Jimmy Swaggart was confronted by rival preacher Marvin Gorman as Swaggart exited the Travel Inn after seeing a prostitute. This incident increased the area's reputation as a locale of "seedy motels". Partly because of that reputation, the section in Jefferson Parish was later renamed Airline Drive.

=== Mississippi ===
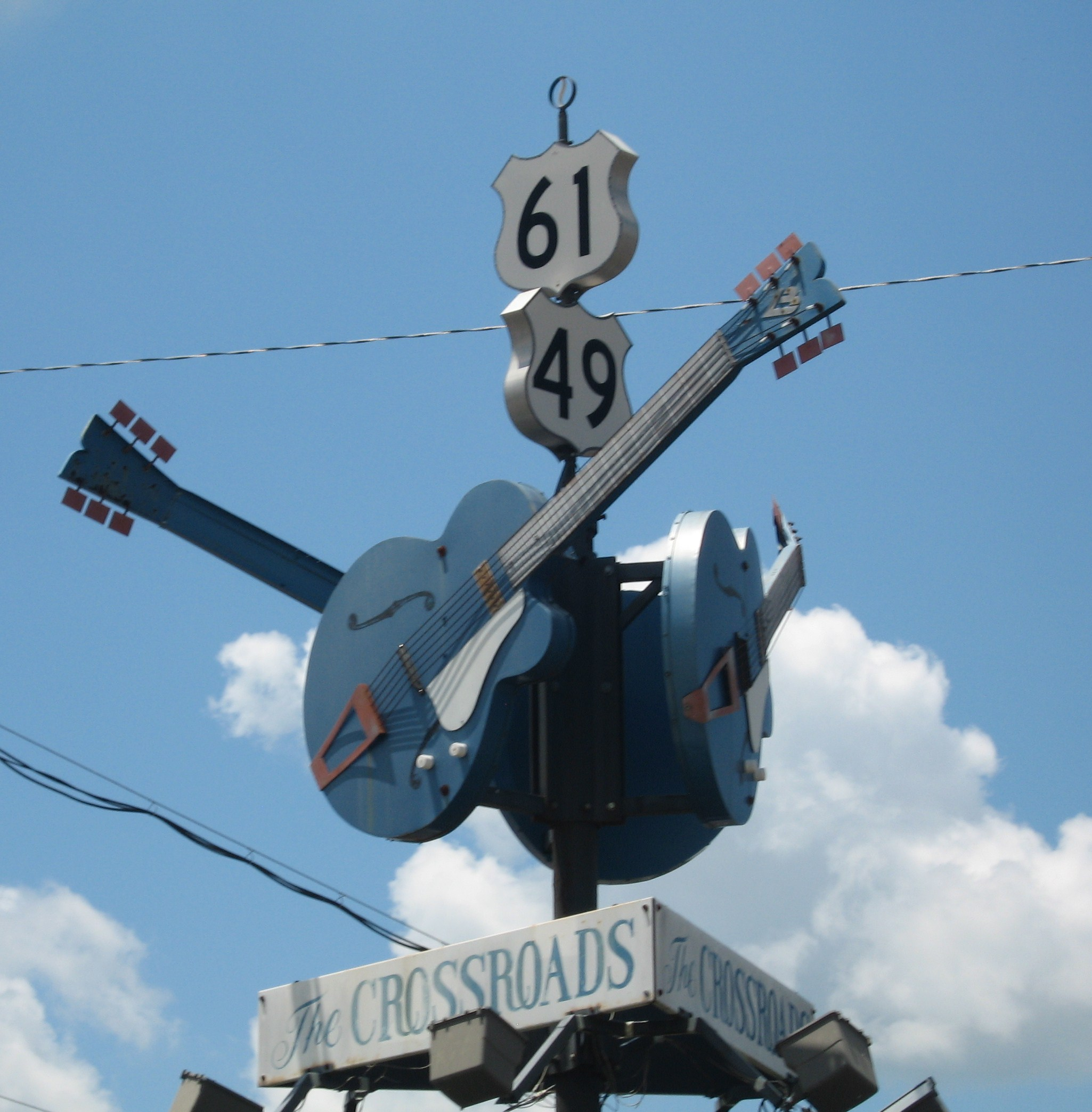
The legendary "Crossroads" at Clarksdale inspired the song Cross Road Blues.

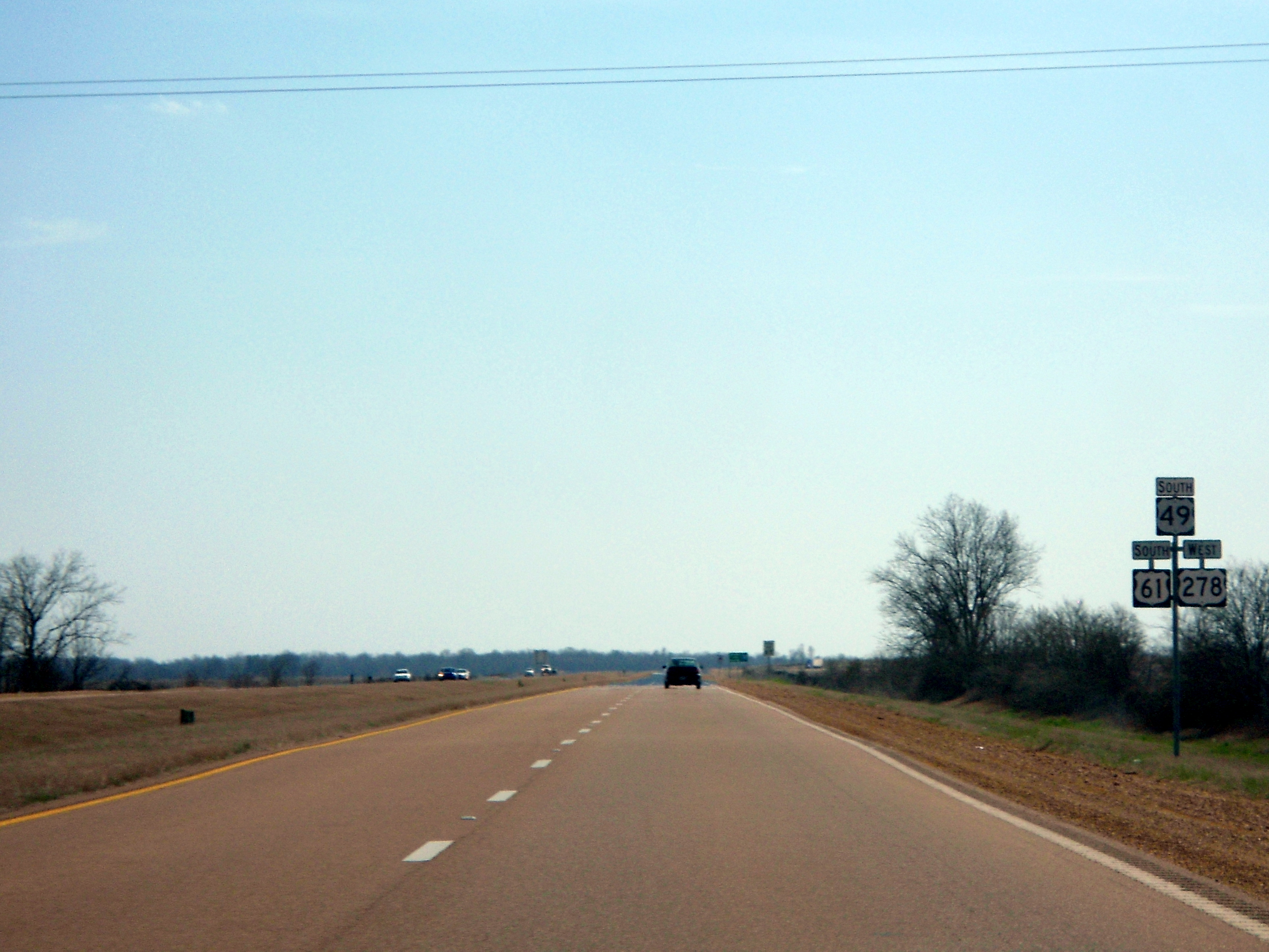
US 61 with US 49 and US 278

US 61 is divided from the Tennessee state line to U.S. 82 in Leland. The highway south of Vicksburg to Natchez is mostly divided and four-lane; only short sections through Port Gibson are two lane. From Natchez to the Louisiana state line, US 61 is now divided and four lanes. The Mississippi Department of Transportation is now widening the highway between Vicksburg and Leland to four lanes, beginning with replacement of the Yazoo River bridge at Redwood in Warren County.

The road is also known as the Blues Highway because it runs through the Mississippi Delta country, which was an important source of blues music. Highway 61 has been referenced in music by various artists with roots in the region.

The former junction of US 61 and U.S. 49 in Clarksdale (North State Street and Desoto Avenue) is designated as the famous crossroads where, according to legend, Robert Johnson supposedly sold his soul to the Devil in exchange for mastery of the blues. US 49 and US 61 are currently routed around the city on a freeway bypass. It was on this stretch of highway that blues singer Bessie Smith died as a result of a car crash on September 26, 1937.

Like Route 66 in the Western U.S., the iconic US 61 sign is so strongly identified with the Clarksdale area that it is used to market different products and services. US 61 is defined in Mississippi Code Annotated § 65-3-3.

=== Tennessee ===
US 61 enters Memphis from Walls as South 3rd Street in South Memphis, continues north to E.H. Crump Boulevard, then turns west, joining US 64, US 70, US 78 and US 79, then joins I-55 as they cross the Mississippi River to West Memphis, a distance of approximately 12 miles (19 km).

=== Arkansas ===
US 61 runs through the state for 76 miles (122 km) from West Memphis to just north of Blytheville, near the Missouri border.

The route enters Arkansas in a concurrency with I-55 and US 64, US 70, US 78 and US 79 near West Memphis. The route skirts the northwest edge of the city, briefly meeting Interstate 40 before continuing north with I-55 and US 64. US 61 overlaps I-55 until an area near Turrell, when US 61 branches east but continues to run parallel to I-55. Southbound US 61 appears disconnected after the reconstruction of the I-555/US 63 interchange in the early 2000s. The old alignment of US 61 between West Memphis and Turrell is currently signed as Arkansas Highway 77. The route runs through many small towns in Mississippi County, and becomes a city street in Osceola. Continuing north, the route crosses over I-55, south of Blytheville. In the city, US 61 becomes South Division Street until crossing Main Street (AR 18). The route runs north through the rest of Blytheville and beyond until a junction with AR 150 near Yarbro. After this junction, the route continues due north to Missouri.

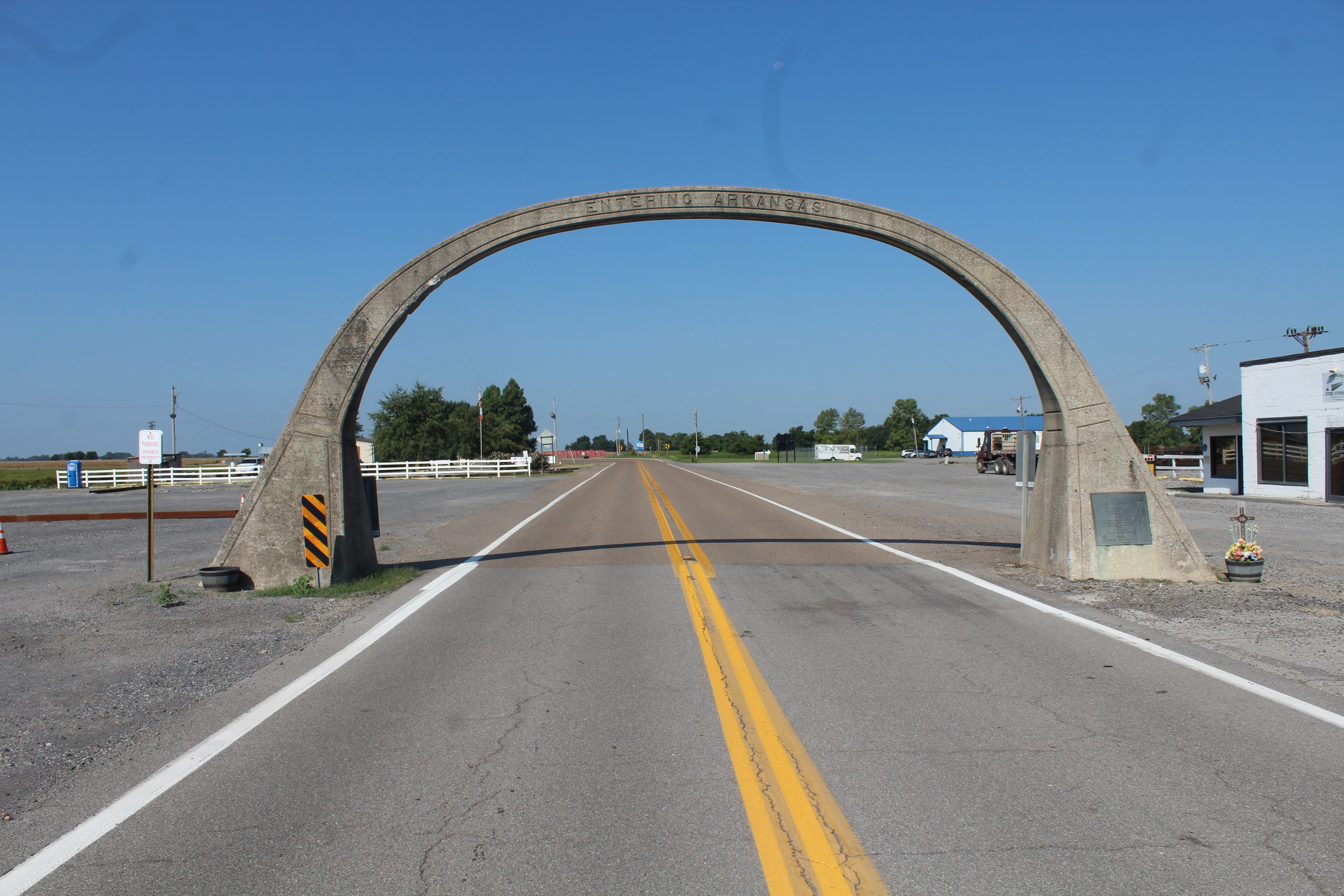
The US 61 arch at the Arkansas-Missouri border

=== Missouri ===
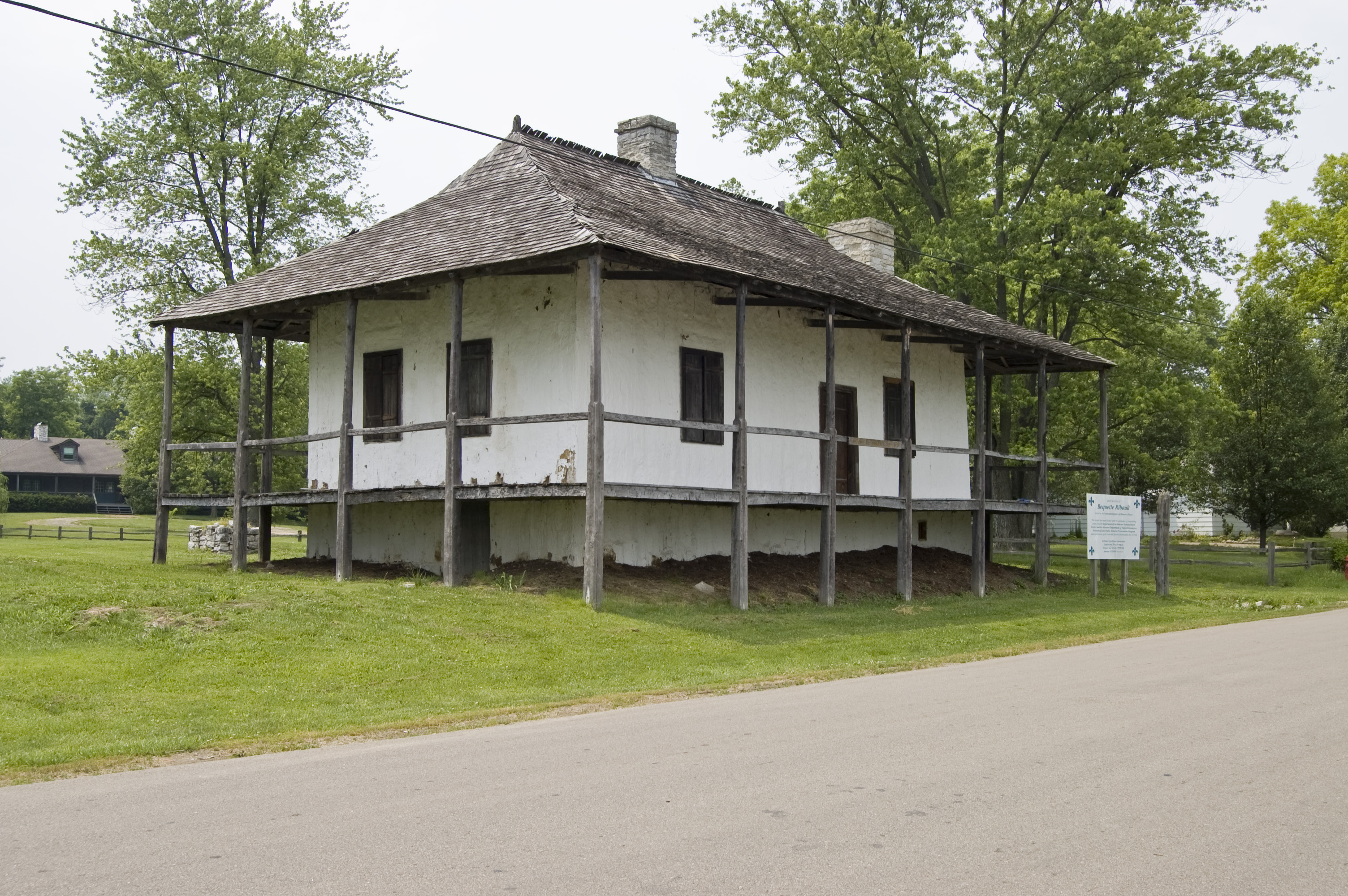
Bequette-Ribault Historic House c1789, in Ste. Genevieve, MO

US 61 enters Missouri south of Steele, passing under a concrete arch that was constructed by the Mississippi County, Arkansas highway department in 1924. The alignment of the highway is closely followed by I-55 between there and the St. Louis area, with portions of the two highways overlapping. Between Howardville and Sikeston, US 61 overlaps with US 62. At Sikeston, US 61 also meets US 60. Crossing Route 32 at "one of the oldest French Colonial settlements west of the Mississippi River (1735)", Ste. Genevieve, the road continues through Ste. Genevieve County. The highway then turns northwest and meets US 67 at Festus. The two highways overlap until separating in the St. Louis area in Ladue, where US 61 meets I-64 and US 40. While in the St. Louis area, US 61 is on Lindbergh Boulevard, which goes by the name of Kirkwood Road while in that municipality.

After meeting I-64 and US 40, US 61 turns west with them and its overlap with the Avenue of the Saints begins. At Wentzville, the overlap with I-64 and US 40 ends when it meets I-70, with the former ending at I-70. It continues in a general northwesterly route, meeting US 54 at Bowling Green and US 36 and I-72 at Hannibal, an intersection which is I-72's western terminus. Northwest of Hannibal, US 61 meets US 24 and the two overlap until they separate at Taylor. US 61 continues north until near Wayland, where the highway turns east at Route 27 and the overlap with the Avenue of the Saints ends. Shortly before leaving Missouri, US 61 meets US 136 and the two overlap until entering Iowa. US 61 in Missouri was formerly known as Route 9.

US 61 runs along the western side of the Mississippi River between Memphis, Tennessee, and Dubuque, Iowa, and therefore never enters the state of Illinois.

=== Iowa ===
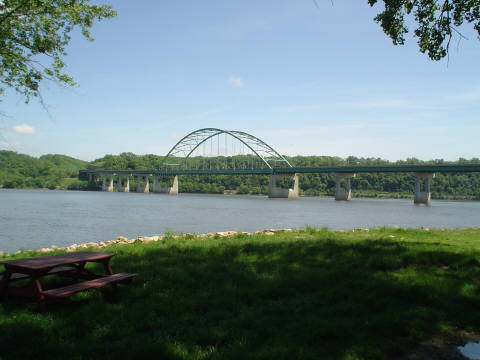
The Dubuque-Wisconsin Bridge over the Mississippi River.

US 61 enters Iowa overlapped with US 136 near Keokuk. They separate in Keokuk and US 61 turns north there and meets US 218 in northwestern Keokuk. They overlap for 6 miles (9.7 km), then US 218 turns northwest. US 61 goes north until crossing Iowa 2 and becomes a four-lane freeway bypass around Fort Madison. US 61 then turns northeast and meets US 34 in Burlington. The highway goes north and overlaps Iowa 92 from Grandview to Muscatine. At Muscatine, the highway turns east to go towards the Quad Cities. At Davenport, US 61 follows I-280 and I-80 around Davenport and meets Business 61.

After I-80, the highway turns back north as a freeway until De Witt, which is where it meets US 30. It continues north from there to Dubuque as an expressway except for a freeway section in the Maquoketa area. The highway joins with US 151 about six miles (9.7 km) south of Dubuque. US 61 and US 151 are joined at the Southwest Arterial in Dubuque by US 52, which separates in Key West. Also in Dubuque, a short connecting highway links US 61 and US 151 with US 20. Together, US 61 and US 151 continue through Dubuque, where they cross the Mississippi River and enter Wisconsin via the Dubuque-Wisconsin Bridge.

A four-lane freeway bypass of Fort Madison was completed and opened to traffic in November 2011. A project to widen a five-mile (8.0 km) segment between the Louisa–Muscatine county line near Letts and the south junction of Iowa 92 near Grandview to a four-lane expressway was completed in December 2017. Construction on widening US-61 to a divided highway is under way between Burlington and Mediapolis. The remaining segments between Iowa 92 and Mediapolis, and between the northern end of the Keokuk bypass and the Missouri state line have not been programmed yet by the Iowa DOT.

=== Wisconsin ===
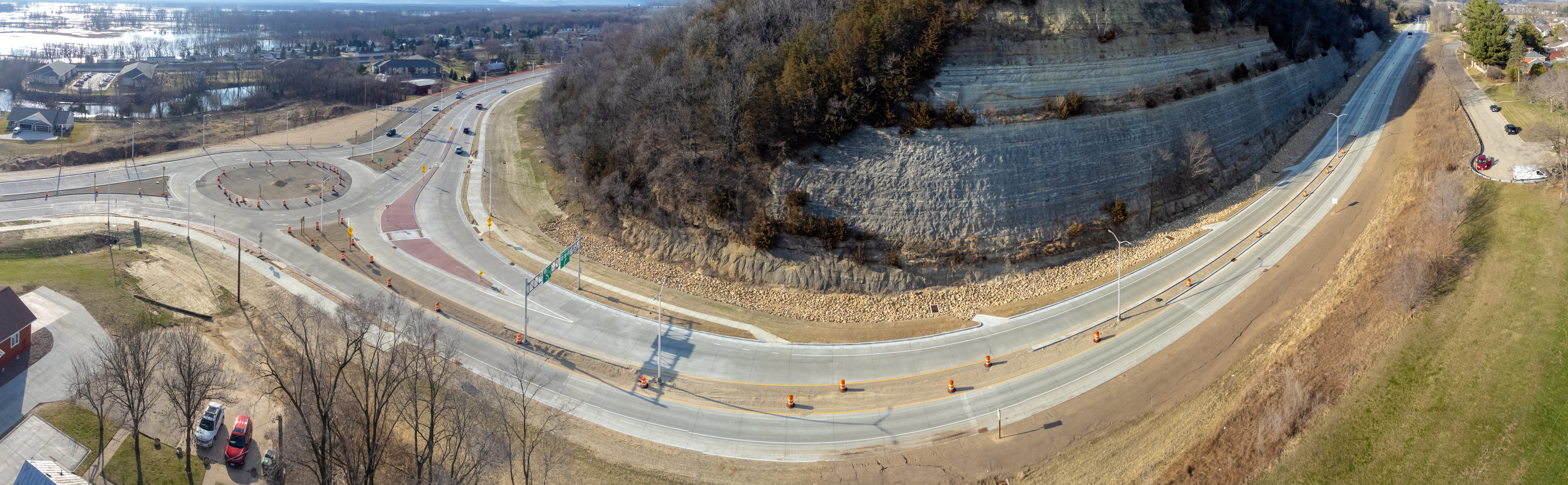
US 14-61 roundabout in La Crosse

On the opposite bank of the Mississippi, US 61 and US 151 enter Grant County, with US 61 going north through Wisconsin about 120 miles (190 km) to La Crosse. US 151 separates from US 61 at Dickeyville, with US 61 proceeding through Lancaster, Fennimore, and Boscobel. At Readstown US 61 and US 14 join and proceed together to La Crosse.

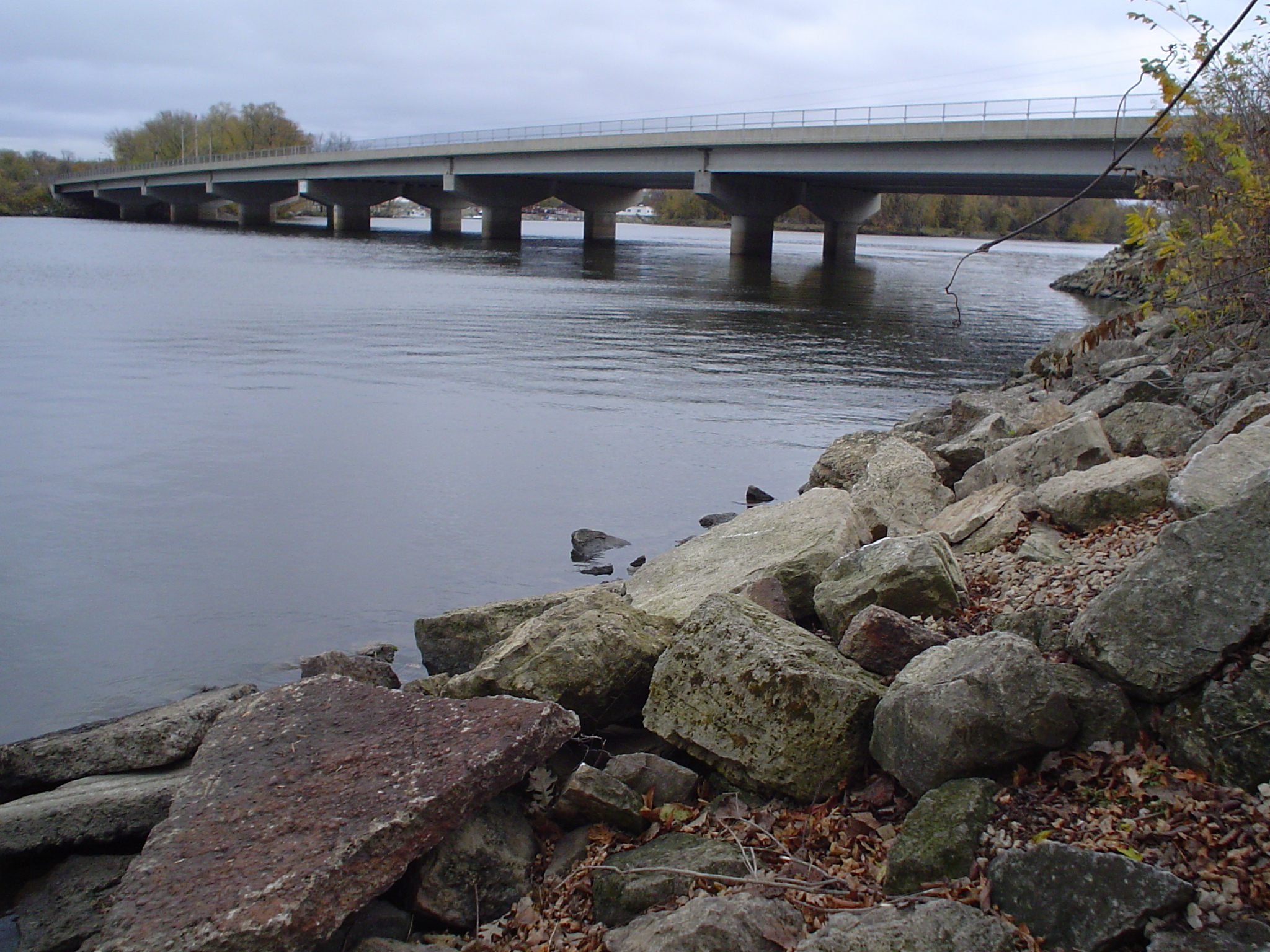
The La Crosse West Channel Bridge carrying US 14, US 61 and State Highway 16 across the Mississippi River between La Crescent, Minnesota, and La Crosse, Wisconsin. This is the river's West Channel.

In 2004, a new two-lane Mississippi River Bridge opened in La Crosse, creating a four-lane highway from downtown La Crosse to the Minnesota state line. The new bridge brings traffic into La Crosse, and is located just south of the old Cass Street Bridge which continues to be used by traffic heading towards Minnesota.

=== Minnesota ===
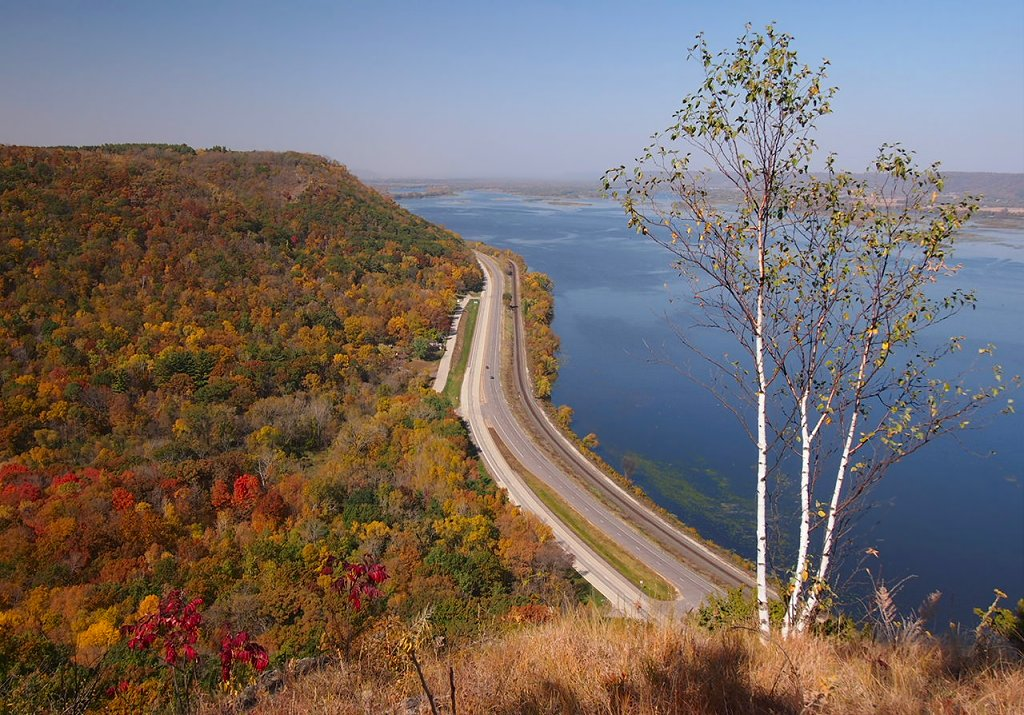
Route 61 along the Mississippi River from Minnesota's John A. Latsch State Park

The four-lane highway continues north to La Crescent. US 61 follows the Mississippi River through southeast Minnesota through the cities of Winona, Lake City, and Red Wing. It crosses the river at Hastings using the Hastings Bridge and joins US 10 before entering St. Paul. Within the city, the route follows I-94 for a short distance, and then follows Mounds Boulevard, East 7th Street, and Arcade Street through the east side of St. Paul.

The 120 miles (190 km) section of US 61 from La Crescent to Cottage Grove is officially designated the Disabled American Veterans Highway.

The portion of US 61 north of Duluth is now part of the Minnesota State Highway system, bearing the designation MN 61 since 1991. Between the city of Wyoming and Duluth, the highway has been turned back to local jurisdiction or supplanted by I-35.

== History ==
US 61 once ran 1,714 miles (2,758 km) from New Orleans through Duluth, Minnesota all the way to the Canada–US border. The road has been shortened to 1,400 miles (2,300 km) ending now in the city of Wyoming, Minnesota at an intersection with I-35.

The northern section of US 61 in Minnesota was separated when I-35 was constructed, and decommissioned in 1991.

=== Mississippi ===
The section of US 61 in northwestern Mississippi, between the state line and Clarksdale, has received numerous changes since 1990, when casinos were legalized by the state, in concert with expanding suburban development from Memphis into Mississippi. The resulting boom in casino development in Tunica County, coupled with dramatic population and development growth in DeSoto County south of Memphis has led to relocating most of the highway and expanding to a divided four-lane highway.

=== Missouri ===
The present-day course of US 61 south of St. Louis largely follows the original course of the Spanish colonial road El Camino Real. In 1776, when the Spanish lieutenant governor recognized that the two principal communities of St. Louis and Ste. Genevieve needed an overland connection, he wrote his superior requesting permission. Construction then began, with parts of the Spanish road following old Indian trails. The road had been reportedly constructed by 1779, and then extended further south to the provincial posts at Cape Girardeau and New Madrid, and extended northwest to the post of St. Charles. The sole rationale for the Camino Real was a military road to connect the several district posts for defense and administrative purposes. Much of the road was a simple trace for horses and foot travelers, and by 1796 transport large enough to require the use of wagons was largely being moved up the Mississippi River.

The original Spanish name el camino real was conferred by Colonel George Morgan in honor of Charles IV of Spain, the reigning King of Spain (1788-1808). The government road was known as le Chemin du Roi or Rue Royale by the local French-speaking population and known as King's Highway or the old King's Trace by early American settlers. Because the road led to the French colonial "Illinois Country", which also included parts of present-day Missouri, early American settlers sometimes referred to it as the Illinois Road. It is also known as the Royal Road of the King's Domain in St.Charles County, Missouri. King's Highway or Kingshighway continues as street names in present-day St.Charles, St.Louis, Perryville, Cape Girardeau, Sikeston and New Madrid.

When it was designated in 1926, US 61 replaced most of Route 9, which had been established in 1922 between Arkansas and Iowa. The only part that did not become part of US 61 was north of Wayland, where US 61 turned east on Route 4, and Route 9 became Route 4B (now Route 81) to the state line. Since then, US 61 has been moved to a shorter route between Jackson and Festus, replacing much of Route 25; the old alignment is now Route 72 and US 67.

=== Iowa ===
Prior to 1958, US 61 followed the route now known as Iowa 22 between Davenport and Muscatine. US 61 was then rerouted onto the old Iowa 22 which passed through Blue Grass.

Starting in the early 1980s, US 61 between Davenport and Dubuque was rebuilt as a four-lane highway. The first link, a 19-mile (31 km) stretch between Davenport and De Witt, was finished in 1982; a bypass around De Witt, which overlapped US 30, was in use starting in November 1975. Subsequent links were completed to Maquoketa (in 1996) and finally to Dubuque in 1999. When the final link was completed, Dubuque finally had a direct four-lane connection to Interstate 80.

In 1983, two multi-lane one-way routes were designated through Davenport starting at the northern city limits. Southbound traffic used the newly constructed Welcome Way until it merges with Harrison Street just north of 35th Street; northbound traffic use Brady Street (which had been a two-way, four-lane street). Other two-way stretches of the highway through Davenport have four (or more) lanes. In 2010, in large part due to a railroad bridge with a low clearance in downtown Davenport, US 61 through Davenport was moved to Interstates 80 and 280, with signing taking place in the fall of 2011; the highway through Davenport was redesignated as "US 61 Business."

A 7.5-mile (12.1 km) bypass around Muscatine was opened in 1984, but other changes on the stretch south of Davenport would not happen for another decade. The changes came as follows:

- 1996 – The completion of a 4-mile (6.4 km), four-lane stretch between Blue Grass and I-280 in Davenport.
- November 2000 — A 14-mile (23 km) stretch between Blue Grass and the Muscatine bypass was opened.
- May 2001 — A 3-mile (4.8 km) bypass around Blue Grass.
- July 2002 — A 7 1/2-mile (12.1 km) stretch, from the Muscatine bypass to the southern tip of Muscatine County, just north of Letts.
- December 2017 — A new stretch of divided highway from the Muscatine-Louisa county line to near Grandview was opened to traffic, including an interchange with Iowa 92 and County Highway G48.

The final stretch completed a continuous multi-laned link between Dickeyville, Wisconsin south to Grandview.

=== Illinois ===
Prior to the construction of the Dubuque-Wisconsin Bridge, US 61 passed through a short distance through Jo Daviess County between Dubuque and Wisconsin, concurrent with US 151. Now both highways cross the Mississippi on the Dubuque-Wisconsin Bridge, which directly connects Wisconsin and Iowa, with neither US 61 nor US 151 passing through Illinois.

=== Minnesota ===
US 61 follows the west bank of the Mississippi River from the Wisconsin border through Hastings where it crosses the river and proceeds to St. Paul. North from the city of Wyoming, Old US 61 continues as "Forest Boulevard" in Chisago County, and then as "County 61" through Pine and Carlton counties before ending at MN 210. The original US 61 had continued east along MN 210 to Carlton and north on present-day MN 45 to Scanlon before turning northeast on what is now "County 61 / Old US 61" through Esko.

I-35 has replaced the original US 61 descending Thompson Hill into West Duluth, from which most of the city of Duluth can be seen entering town, including the Aerial Lift Bridge and the waterfront. The original US 61 in the city of Duluth had previously followed Cody Street, Grand Avenue, Superior Street, Second Street, Third Street, and London Road.

The original US 61 between Duluth and Canada was designated as MN 61 in 1991. MN 61, part of the Lake Superior Circle Tour route, follows the North Shore of Lake Superior, where it becomes Ontario Highway 61 upon entering Canada. Highway 61 continues to the city of Thunder Bay, where it ends at an intersection with the Trans-Canada Highway.

Starting in 2012 Chisago, Carlton and Pine Counties began placing "OLD US 61" markers along the former routing of US 61 through their respective counties.

== Major intersections ==
The following is a list of intersections between US 61 and other interstate or U.S. Highways.

=== Louisiana ===
US 90 in New Orleans
I-10 in New Orleans
I-310 in St. Rose
US 51 in LaPlace
I-10 southeast of Sorrento
I-12 in Baton Rouge
US 190 in Baton Rouge. The highways travel concurrently through the city.
I-110 in Baton Rouge
I-110 in Baton Rouge

=== Mississippi ===
US 84 / US 425 in Natchez. US 61/US 84 travels concurrently to west-southwest of Washington.
US 84 / US 98 west-southwest of Washington
I-20 / US 80 in Vicksburg. The highways travel concurrently through the city.
US 82 / US 278 east of Leland. US 61/US 278 travels concurrently to Clarksdale.
Future I-69 / US 278 near Merigold. I-69/US 61 will travel concurrently to near Tunica.
US 49 in Clarksdale. The highways travel concurrently to west-northwest of Rich.

=== Tennessee ===
I-55 in Memphis
US 64 / US 70 / US 78 / US 79 in Memphis. US 61/US 64 travels concurrently to Marion, Arkansas. US 61/US 70/US 79 travels concurrently to West Memphis, Arkansas. US 78 travels concurrently to Blytheville, Arkansas.
I-55 in Memphis. The highways travel concurrently to Turrell.

=== Arkansas ===
I-40 in West Memphis. The highways travel concurrently through the city.
I-40 / US 79 in West Memphis.
I-55 / I-555 in Turrell
I-55 in Blytheville
US 78 in Blytheville

=== Missouri ===
I-55 east of Steele. The highways travel concurrently to Portageville.
I-155 / US 412 in Hayti
US 62 southwest of Howardville. The highways travel concurrently to Sikeston.
I-55 in New Madrid
I-55 north of New Madrid
Future I-57 / US 60 in Sikeston
I-55 in Scott City. The highways travel concurrently to Cape Girardeau.
I-55 in Cape Girardeau
I-55 north-northeast of Jackson
I-55 south-southeast of Festus
US 67 in Crystal City. The highways travel concurrently to the Frontenac–Ladue city line.
I-255 in Mehlville
US 50 in Mehlville. The highways travel concurrently to the Sunset Hills–Kirkwood city line.
I-55 on the Concord–Mehlville–Green Park line
I-44 / US 50 on the Sunset Hills–Kirkwood city line
I-64 / US 40 on the Frontenac–Ladue city line. The highways travel concurrently to Wentzville.
I-270 in Town and Country
I-64 / I-70 / US 40 in Wentzville
US 54 north of Bowling Green
I-72 / US 36 in Hannibal
US 24 south of Palmyra. The highways travel concurrently to Taylor.
US 136 west-northwest of Alexandria. The highways travel concurrently to Keokuk, Iowa.

=== Iowa ===
US 218 in Keokuk. The highways travel concurrently to southwest of Montrose.
US 34 in Burlington
I-280 in Davenport. The highways travel concurrently through the city.
US 6 in Davenport. The highways travel concurrently through the city.
I-80 / I-280 / US 6 in Davenport. I-80/US 61 travels concurrently through the city.
US 30 southwest of DeWitt. The highways travel concurrently to DeWitt.
US 151 south of Dubuque. The highways travel concurrently to south of Dickeyville, Wisconsin.
US 52 in Dubuque County. The highways travel concurrently for a short distance south of Dubuque .

=== Wisconsin ===
US 18 in Fennimore. The highways travel concurrently through the city.
US 14 in Readstown. The highways travel concurrently to Winona, Minnesota.
US 53 in La Crosse, Wisconsin

=== Minnesota ===
I-90 north of La Crescent. The highways travel concurrently to Dakota.
US 63 in Lake City. The highways travel concurrently to Red Wing.
US 10 north of Hastings. The highways travel concurrently to Saint Paul.
I-494 in Newport
I-94 / US 12 in Saint Paul. The highways travel concurrently through the city.
I-94 / US 10 / US 12 in Saint Paul
I-694 in Vadnais Heights
US 8 in Forest Lake
I-35 in Wyoming

== See also ==
- Avenue of the Saints
- Highway 61, a 1991 film

=== Special routes ===
- Special routes of U.S. Route 61
- U.S. Route 61 Business (Keokuk, Iowa)
- U.S. Route 61 Business (Muscatine, Iowa)
- U.S. Route 61 Business (Davenport, Iowa)
- U.S. Route 61 Business (St. Francisville, Louisiana)
- U.S. Route 61 Business (Vicksburg, Mississippi)
- U.S. Route 61 Business (Natchez, Mississippi)

=== Related routes ===
- U.S. Route 161

Browse numbered routes
← AR 60	AR	→ US 62
← I-59	MS	→ MS 63
← SR 60	TN	→ SR 61
← US 60	MO	→ US 62
← Iowa 60	IA	→ Iowa 62
← WIS 60	WI	→ WIS 62
← MN 60	MN	→ MN 61
