= Muscatine Community School District =

Public school district in Muscatine, Iowa, United States

Location
- Muscatine, Iowa Muscatine County
- Coordinates: 41.442630, -91.067847

District information
- Motto: Ensuring Excellence in Education for Every Student
- Grades: K-12
- Superintendent: Clint Christopher
- Schools: 9
- Budget: $69,672,000 (2020-21)
- NCES District ID: 1920130

Students and staff
- Students: 4,688 (2022-23)
- Teachers: 320.46 FTE
- Staff: 352.46 FTE
- Student–teacher ratio: 14.63
- Athletic conference: Mississippi Athletic Conference
- District mascot: Muskies
- Colors: Purple and Gold

Other information
- Website: www.muscatine.k12.ia.us

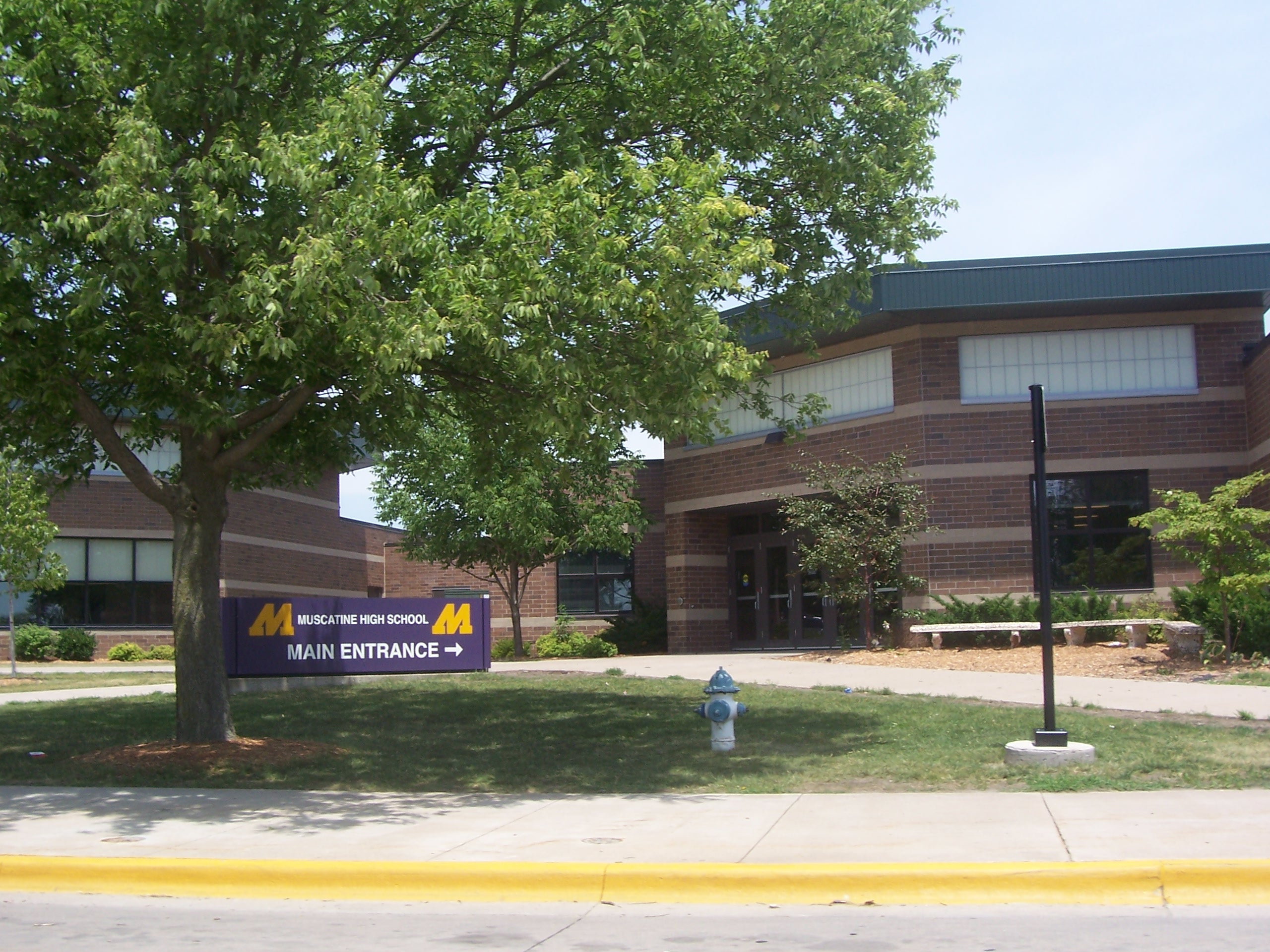
Muscatine High School

The Muscatine Community School District (MCSD) is a public school district located in Muscatine, Iowa, serving almost all of the city and the surrounding rural areas, including the census-designated places of Fairport and Montpelier.

The district consists of one Pre-K school, six elementary (K-5) schools, two middle (6-8) schools, Muscatine High School (9-12) and one alternative program, East Campus. In 2005, Madison Elementary received the National Blue Ribbon School designation, an award which was subsequently given to McKinley Elementary in 2010 and to Washington Elementary in 2011. Muscatine Community is the only district in Iowa to have three blue ribbon schools in this time period.

== History ==
In 1867, Susan Clark, a 13-year-old African American, sued the local school board of Muscatine, Iowa, because she was refused admittance into Grammar School No. 2 under the notion that it was a white school only. Clark, the daughter of local businessman Alexander Clark, said in her lawsuit that the segregation was a violation of Iowa law and the Iowa State Constitution. Iowa trial court and state district court sided with Clark. On appeal, the Iowa Supreme Court upheld the district court's decision.

In July 2019, Jerry Riibe announced his resignation as superintendent. On January 24, 2020, the district announced the hiring of Clint Christopher as superintendent, beginning on July 1, 2020. Christopher was the superintendent of Eastern Carver County School District in Chaska, Minnesota since 2017. Before that, he was the associate superintendent for the district.

== Schools ==
The district operates nine schools, all in Muscatine:

- Pre-K
  - Muskie Early Learning Center
- Elementary (K-6)
  - Franklin Elementary School
  - Grant Elementary School
  - Jefferson Elementary School
  - Madison Elementary School
  - McKinley Elementary School
  - Mulberry Elementary School
- Middle School (7-8)
  - Susan Clark Junior High
- High School (9-12)
  - Muscatine High School

== See also ==
- Clark v. Board of School Directors
- List of school districts in Iowa
