= Muscatine High School =

Public secondary school in Muscatine, Iowa, United States

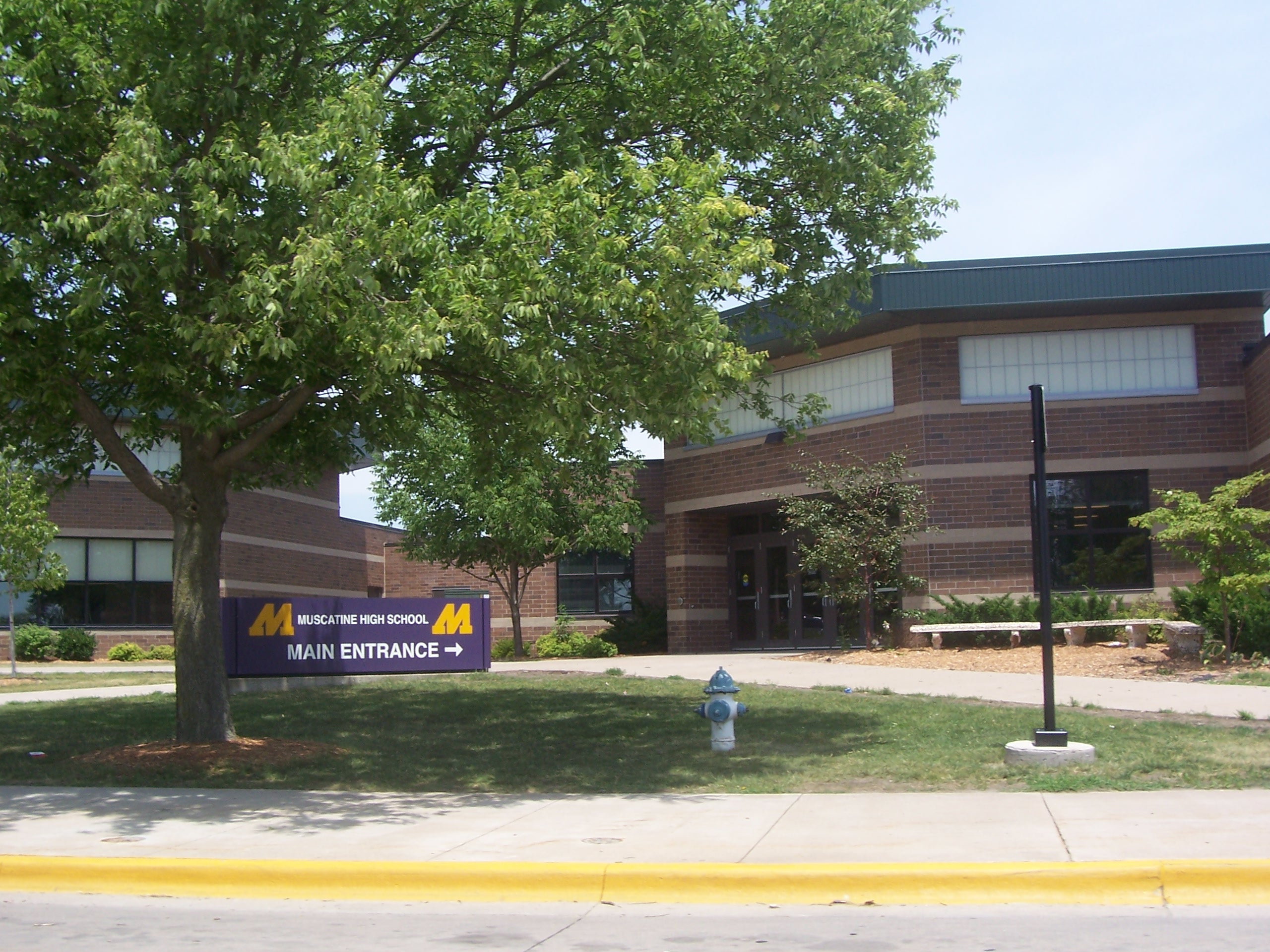

Location
- 2705 Cedar Street; Muscatine, Iowa 52761; United States
- 41°26′21″N 91°04′32″W

Information
- Type: Public high school
- Established: 1974; 52 years ago
- Oversight: Muscatine Community School District
- Principal: Terry Hogenson
- Teaching staff: 88.57 (FTE)
- Grades: 9–12
- Enrollment: 1,380 (2024-2025)
- Student to teacher ratio: 15.58
- Colors: Purple; Gold
- Athletics conference: Mississippi Athletic Conference
- Mascot: Muscatine Muskies
- Website: mhs.muscatine.k12.ia.us

Muscatine High School is a four-year comprehensive public high school in Muscatine, Iowa. The school is part of the Muscatine Community School District. Located approximately one mile east of U.S. Highway 61 in Muscatine, Muscatine High School teaches students from the city and adjacent rural areas.

== Publications ==
- The Auroran News: The school newspaper published regularly during the academic year. Students manage all aspects of the publication.
- MHS Today: The online version of the school newspaper is available at mhstoday.com. It is completely designed and managed by Muscatine High School students.
- The Auroran: The Muscatine High School yearbook is released annually and is completely designed and written by students.

== Athletics ==
The Muskies are members of the Mississippi Athletic Conference (MAC).

The school fields athletic teams in 21 sports, including:

- Summer: Baseball and softball
  - Baseball (3-time Baseball State Champions - 1956, 1957, 1958)
  - Softball (2-time State Champions - 1989, 2000)
- Fall: Football, volleyball, girls' swimming, girls' cross country
  - Boys' cross country (5-time State Champions - 1929, 1930, 1934, 1978, 1990)
  - Boys' golf (3-time State Champions - 1961, 1964, 2002)
  - Girls' swimming (2-time State Champions - 1982, 1985)
- Winter: Girls' basketball, girls' bowling
  - Boys' basketball (2-time State Champions - 1927, 1954)
  - Girls' basketball (1989 State Champions)
  - Boys' swimming (4-time State Champions - 1960, 2011, 2012, 2013)
  - Girls' bowling (3-time Class 2A State Champions - 2008, 2010, 2011)
- Spring: Boys' and girls' track and field, boys' soccer, girls' soccer, boys' tennis

== Notable alumni ==
- Ben Barkema, free agent draft pick in the 2008 NFL draft
- Jim Yong Kim, 17th president of Dartmouth College and president of the World Bank, succeeded Robert Zoellick
- Sarah Lacina, police officer, winner of Survivor: Game Changers
- Murray Wier, professional basketball player
- Joe Wieskamp, professional basketball player

== See also ==
- List of high schools in Iowa
