= Morning sun =

Morning sun may refer to:

- Sun, the Solar System's star
  - Sunrise

== Places in the United States ==
- Morning Sun, Iowa
- Morning Sun Township, Louisa County, Iowa
- Morning Sun, Ohio
- Morning Sun, Tennessee

== Music ==
- Morning Sun (album), by Barbara Mandrell, 1990
- Morning Sun (EP), by the Beautiful Girls, 2002
- "Morning Sun" (Robbie Williams song), 2010
- "Morning Sun" (Robin Thicke song), 2015
- "Morning Sun", a song by Sault from 11 (2022)
- "Morning Sun", a song by the Spencer Davis Group from With Their New Face On, 1968

== Newspapers ==
- The Morning Sun, Pittsburg, Kansas, US
- Morning Sun, published by Judson King in Denison, Texas, US

== Other uses ==
- Morning Sun (film), a 2003 American documentary about China's Cultural Revolution
- Morning Sun (painting), a 1952 painting by Edward Hopper
- Morning Sun, a 1963 off-Broadway musical with a book by Fred Ebb
- Morning Sun, a 2021 play by Simon Stephens
