= Iowa Highway 70 =

State highway in Iowa, United States

Iowa Highway 70
- Iowa 70 highlighted in red

Route information
- Maintained by Iowa DOT
- Length: 23.954 mi (38.550 km)
- Existed: 1969–present

Major junctions
- South end: Iowa 92 at Columbus Junction
- Iowa 22 overlap near Nichols
- North end: US 6 at West Liberty

Location
- Country: United States
- State: Iowa
- Counties: Louisa; Muscatine

Highway system
- Iowa Primary Highway System; Interstate; US; State; Secondary; Scenic
← US 69	→ US 71

Iowa Highway 70 (Iowa 70) is a state highway spanning 24 miles (39 km) from north to south in eastern Iowa. It begins at Iowa Highway 92 in Columbus Junction, and ends at U.S. Highway 6 in West Liberty.

== Route description ==
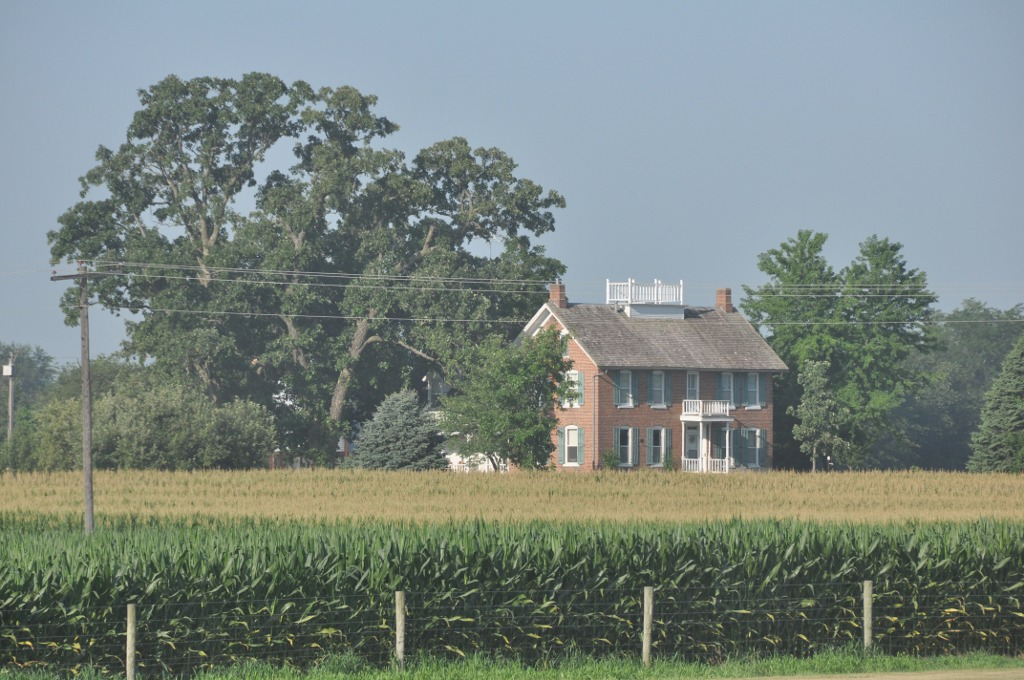
The Samuel Nichols House north of Columbus Junction

Iowa Highway 70 begins less than 1 mile (1.6 km) from the confluence of the Iowa River and the Cedar River near Columbus Junction. It bypasses Columbus Junction to the north and east, then straightens out and crosses the Iowa River. As the Iowa River meanders away, the highway passes riverfront houses on the banks of the Cedar River. The Cedar also meanders away and Iowa 70 enters Conesville. It continues north towards Nichols, following an abandoned Burlington, Cedar Rapids and Northern Railway line. At Nichols, Iowa 70 intersects Iowa Highway 22 and the two highways overlap for 3 miles (4.8 km). From the split with Iowa 22, Iowa 70 heads north towards West Liberty. Iowa 70 ends at an intersection with U.S. Highway 6 in West Liberty.

== History ==
Iowa Highway 70 was created in 1969. It replaced the former Iowa Highway 76 as that number was reassigned to a highway in northeastern Iowa. The original route ran from Columbus City to West Liberty. In the mid-1990s, a short bypass was built around Columbus Junction. Iowa 70 traffic was rerouted onto the bypass where it ends today. The old segment stayed remained in the primary highway system until July 1, 2003, when it was turned over to Louisa County.

== Major intersections ==
County	Location	mi	km	Destinations	Notes
Louisa	Columbus Junction	0.000	0.000	Iowa 92 (Oak Street) – Grandview, Ainsworth	
Muscatine	Nichols	14.805	23.826	Iowa 22 west (Ijem Avenue) – Riverside	
Muscatine	Pike Township	17.692	28.473	Iowa 22 east – Muscatine	
Muscatine	West Liberty	23.954	38.550	US 6 west (Columbus Street) / US 6 east (3rd Street) – Atalissa, Iowa City	
1.000 mi = 1.609 km; 1.000 km = 0.621 mi: Concurrency terminus
