= Morning Sun Township, Louisa County, Iowa =

Morning Sun Township
- Township
- Location of Morning Sun Township in Iowa
- Coordinates: 41.10282°N 91.28097°W
- Country: United States
- State: Iowa
- County: Louisa County
- Organized: 1854; 172 years ago
- Incorporated town: Morning Sun

Area
  - Total: 37.6 sq mi (97 km^{2})

Population (2010)
  - Total: 1,217
  - Density: 32/sq mi (12/km^{2})

Morning Sun Township is a township in Louisa County, Iowa.

== Geography ==
It has a land area of 37.6 square miles (97 square kilometres). There are no good sized ponds or lakes, and the only notable water comes from creeks. The total population is 1,217, made up of 584 males and 633 females. It has a population density of 32 people per square mile (12 people/km^{2}).

It has one incorporated town, Morning Sun. Morning Sun's population was 836 as of the 2010 Census. The township's two major roads are Iowa Highway 78 and Iowa Road X37.

=== Nearby townships ===
Morning Sun township borders six others:

- Marshall Township (N/NW)
- Wapello Township (N/NE/E)
- Yellow Spring Township (SE)
- Washington Township (S)
- Canaan Township (SW)
- Scott Township (W/NW)

== History ==
Morning Sun Township was organized in 1854.
