= Cotter, Iowa =

- City
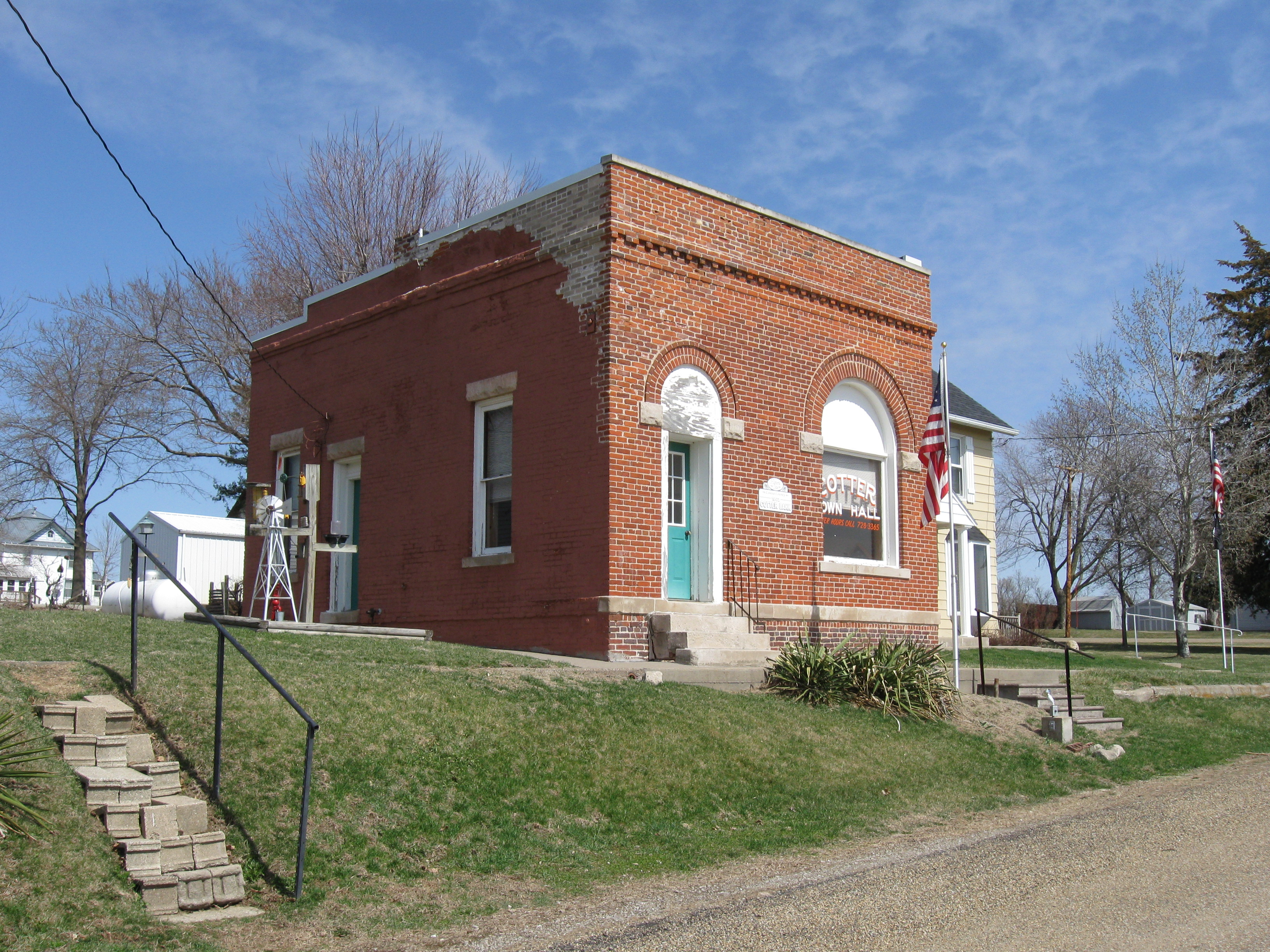
- Cotter, Iowa town hall

- Location of Cotter, Iowa
- Coordinates: 41°17′33″N 91°27′43″W
- Country: United States
- State: Iowa
- County: Louisa

Area
  - Total: 0.097 sq mi (0.25 km^{2})
  - Land: 0.097 sq mi (0.25 km^{2})
  - Water: 0 sq mi (0.00 km^{2})
- Elevation: 715 ft (218 m)

Population (2020)
  - Total: 39
  - Density: 398.2/sq mi (153.76/km^{2})
- Time zone: UTC-6 (Central (CST))
  - Summer (DST): UTC-5 (CDT)
- ZIP code: 52738
- Area code: 319
- FIPS code: 19-16725
- GNIS feature ID: 2393645

Cotter is a city in western Louisa County, Iowa, United States. The population was 39 at the 2020 census. It is part of the Muscatine Micropolitan Statistical Area.

== History ==
Cotter, originally called Cotterville, was laid out in 1878 by Margaret E. Cotter. It was located along the Chicago, Rock Island and Pacific Railroad.

== Geography ==
Cotter is located on Iowa Highway 92 approximately 5.5 miles west of Columbus Junction and one mile east of the Louisa-Washington county line.

According to the United States Census Bureau, the city has a total area of 0.25 square miles (0.65 km^{2}), all land.

== Demographics ==
Historical populations
Year	Pop.	±%
1920	100	—
1930	118	+18.0%
1940	72	−39.0%
1950	49	−31.9%
1960	52	+6.1%
1970	55	+5.8%
1980	60	+9.1%
1990	53	−11.7%
2000	48	−9.4%
2010	48	+0.0%
2020	39	−18.8%
Source:"U.S. Census website". United States Census Bureau. and Iowa Data Center; Source: U.S. Decennial Census

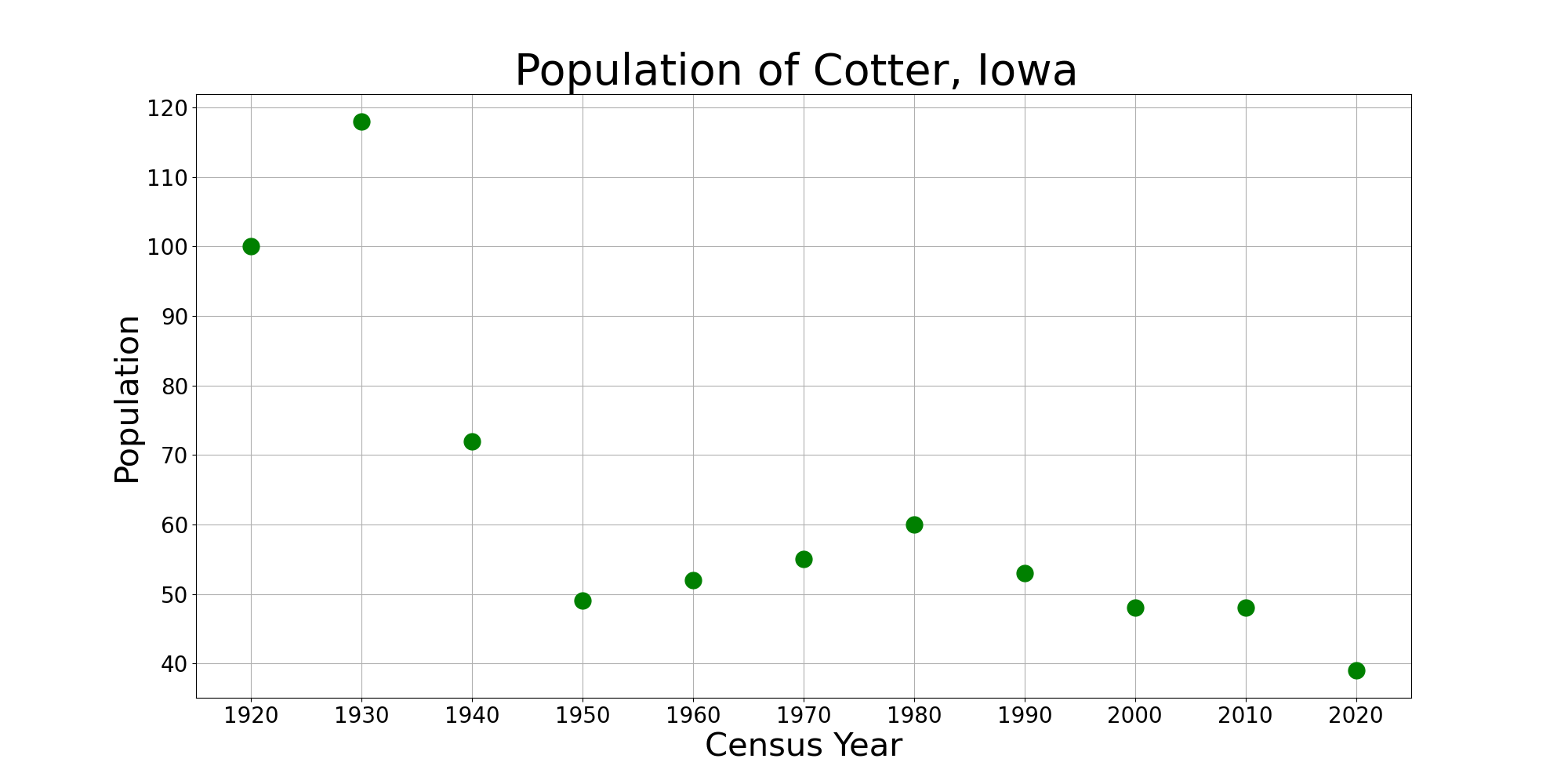
The population of Cotter, Iowa from US census data

=== 2020 census ===
As of the census of 2020, there were 39 people, 14 households, and 10 families residing in the city. The population density was 398.2 inhabitants per square mile (153.8/km^{2}). There were 18 housing units at an average density of 183.8 per square mile (71.0/km^{2}). The racial makeup of the city was 74.4% White, 0.0% Black or African American, 0.0% Native American, 0.0% Asian, 0.0% Pacific Islander, 7.7% from other races and 17.9% from two or more races. Hispanic or Latino persons of any race comprised 30.8% of the population.

Of the 14 households, 57.1% of which had children under the age of 18 living with them, 42.9% were married couples living together, 14.3% were cohabitating couples, 28.6% had a female householder with no spouse or partner present and 14.3% had a male householder with no spouse or partner present. 28.6% of all households were non-families. 28.6% of all households were made up of individuals, 7.1% had someone living alone who was 65 years old or older.

The median age in the city was 30.5 years. 35.9% of the residents were under the age of 20; 10.3% were between the ages of 20 and 24; 17.9% were from 25 and 44; 23.1% were from 45 and 64; and 12.8% were 65 years of age or older. The gender makeup of the city was 43.6% male and 56.4% female.

=== 2010 census ===
At the 2010 census there were 48 people in 19 households, including 14 families, in the city. The population density was 192.0 inhabitants per square mile (74.1/km^{2}). There were 24 housing units at an average density of 96.0 per square mile (37.1/km^{2}). The racial makup of the city was 100.0% White. Hispanic or Latino of any race were 29.2%.

Of the 19 households 21.1% had children under the age of 18 living with them, 63.2% were married couples living together, 5.3% had a female householder with no husband present, 5.3% had a male householder with no wife present, and 26.3% were non-families. 26.3% of households were one person and 5.3% were one person aged 65 or older. The average household size was 2.53 and the average family size was 2.86.

The median age was 44.5 years. 27.1% of residents were under the age of 18; 2.2% were between the ages of 18 and 24; 23% were from 25 to 44; 39.6% were from 45 to 64; and 8.3% were 65 or older. The gender makeup of the city was 33.3% male and 66.7% female.

=== 2000 census ===
At the 2000 census there were 48 people in 19 households, including 14 families, in the city. The population density was 205.3 inhabitants per square mile (79.3/km^{2}). There were 19 housing units at an average density of 81.2 per square mile (31.4/km^{2}). The racial makup of the city was 85.42% White, 4.17% African American, 10.42% from other races. Hispanic or Latino of any race were 14.58%.

Of the 19 households 31.6% had children under the age of 18 living with them, 63.2% were married couples living together, 10.5% had a female householder with no husband present, and 26.3% were non-families. 10.5% of households were one person and none had someone living alone who was 65 or older. The average household size was 2.53 and the average family size was 2.79.

The age distribution was 25.0% under the age of 18, 8.3% from 18 to 24, 29.2% from 25 to 44, 31.3% from 45 to 64, and 6.3% 65 or older. The median age was 35 years. For every 100 females, there were 166.7 males. For every 100 females age 18 and over, there were 125.0 males.

The median household income was $41,250 and the median family income was $26,250. Males had a median income of $34,375 versus $18,750 for females. The per capita income for the city was $13,879. There were 11.1% of families and 18.9% of the population living below the poverty line, including 37.5% of under eighteens and none of those over 64.
