= Grandview Township, Louisa County, Iowa =

Township in Louisa County, Iowa, U.S.

Coordinates: 41.282°N 91.203°W

Grandview Township is a township in Louisa County, Iowa.

== History ==
Grandview Township was organized in 1841.
