= Louisa County, Iowa =

County in Iowa, United States

- County
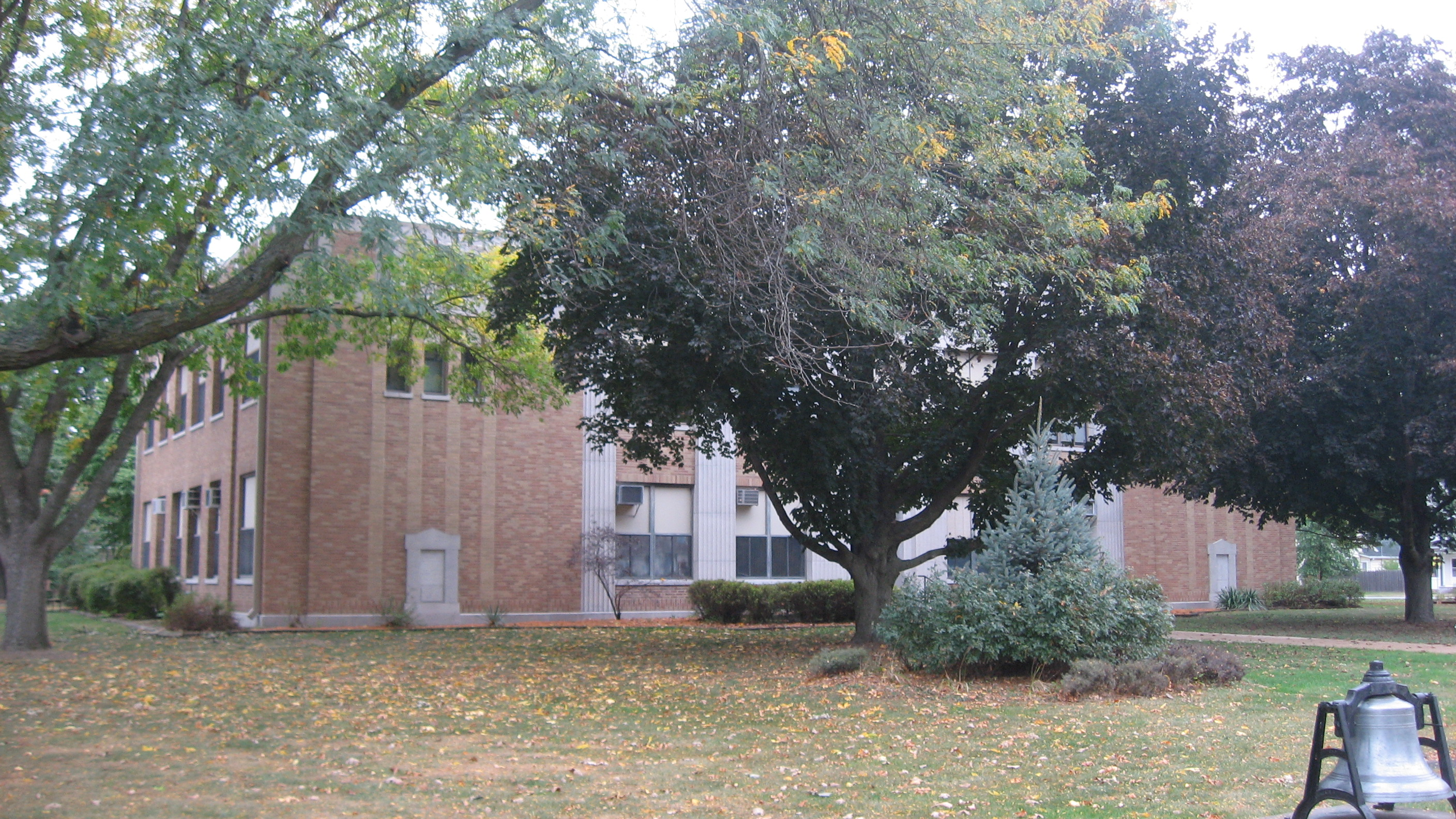
- The Louisa County Courthouse in Wapello

- Location within the U.S. state of Iowa
- Coordinates: 41°13′05″N 91°15′36″W
- Country: United States
- State: Iowa
- Founded: December 7, 1836
- Seat: Wapello
- Largest city: Wapello

Area
  - Total: 418 sq mi (1,080 km^{2})
  - Land: 402 sq mi (1,040 km^{2})
  - Water: 16 sq mi (41 km^{2}) 3.8%

Population (2020)
  - Total: 10,837
  - Estimate (2025): 10,416 ▼
  - Density: 27.0/sq mi (10.4/km^{2})
- Time zone: UTC−6 (Central)
  - Summer (DST): UTC−5 (CDT)
- Congressional district: 1st
- Website: louisacountyia.gov
- Iowa county number 58

Louisa County (/luˈaɪzə/ loo-EYE-zə) is a county located in the U.S. state of Iowa. As of the 2020 census, the population was 10,837. The county seat and the largest city is Wapello.

Louisa County is part of the Muscatine Micropolitan Statistical Area.

== History ==
Louisa County was formed on December 7, 1836, as a part of Wisconsin Territory. Two theories have been offered for the origins of its name: one is that it was named after Louisa Massey, who was very well known in the area at the time because she avenged the murder of her brother when she shot the party responsible; the other is that it was named after Louisa County, Virginia. Louisa County became a part of Iowa Territory upon its formation on July 4, 1838.

The first courthouse was a simple wood-framed building. In 1840, a second courthouse, measuring 40' x 20' (about 12 x 6 m), was constructed of stone. In 1854, a third structure was built. The courthouse used today was erected in 1928.

== Geography ==
According to the United States Census Bureau, the county has a total area of 418 square miles (1,080 km^{2}), of which 402 square miles (1,040 km^{2}) is land and 16 square miles (41 km^{2}) (3.8%) is water. Its eastern border is adjacent to the Mississippi River.

=== Major highways ===
- U.S. Highway 61
- Iowa Highway 70
- Iowa Highway 78
- Iowa Highway 92

=== Adjacent counties ===
- Johnson County (northwest)
- Muscatine County (north)
- Rock Island County, Illinois (northeast)
- Mercer County, Illinois (east)
- Des Moines County (south)
- Henry County (southwest)
- Washington County (west)

=== National protected area ===
- Port Louisa National Wildlife Refuge
- Cone Marsh National Wildlife Area

== Demographics ==
Historical population
Census	Pop.	Note	%±
1850	4,939		—
1860	10,370		110.0%
1870	12,877		24.2%
1880	13,142		2.1%
1890	11,873		−9.7%
1900	13,516		13.8%
1910	12,855		−4.9%
1920	12,179		−5.3%
1930	11,575		−5.0%
1940	11,384		−1.7%
1950	11,101		−2.5%
1960	10,290		−7.3%
1970	10,682		3.8%
1980	12,055		12.9%
1990	11,592		−3.8%
2000	12,183		5.1%
2010	11,387		−6.5%
2020	10,837		−4.8%
2025 (est.)	10,416	▼	−3.9%
U.S. Decennial Census; 1790–1960 1900–1990; 1990–2000 2010–2020

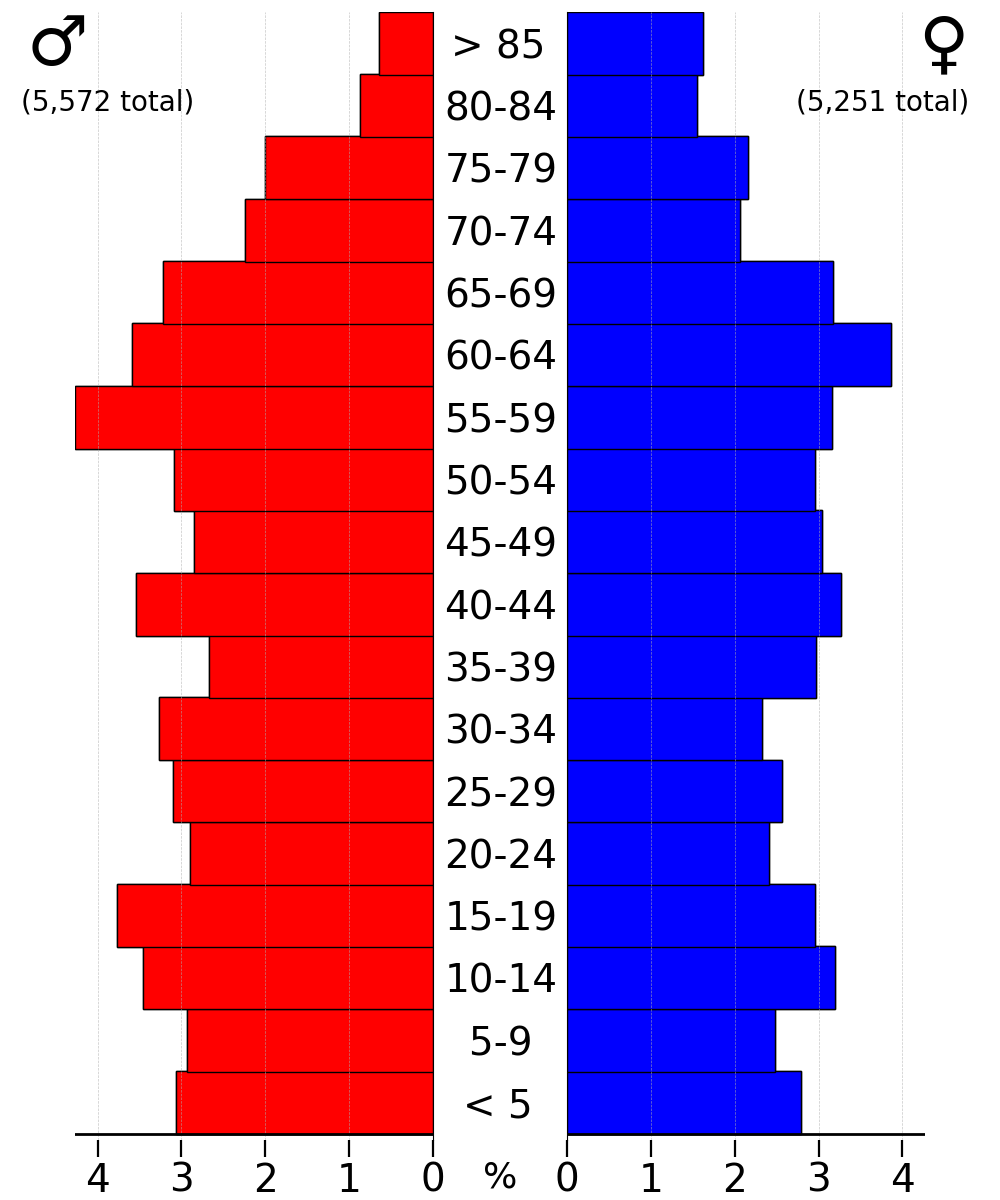
2022 US Census population pyramid for Louisa County from ACS 5-year estimates

=== 2020 census ===
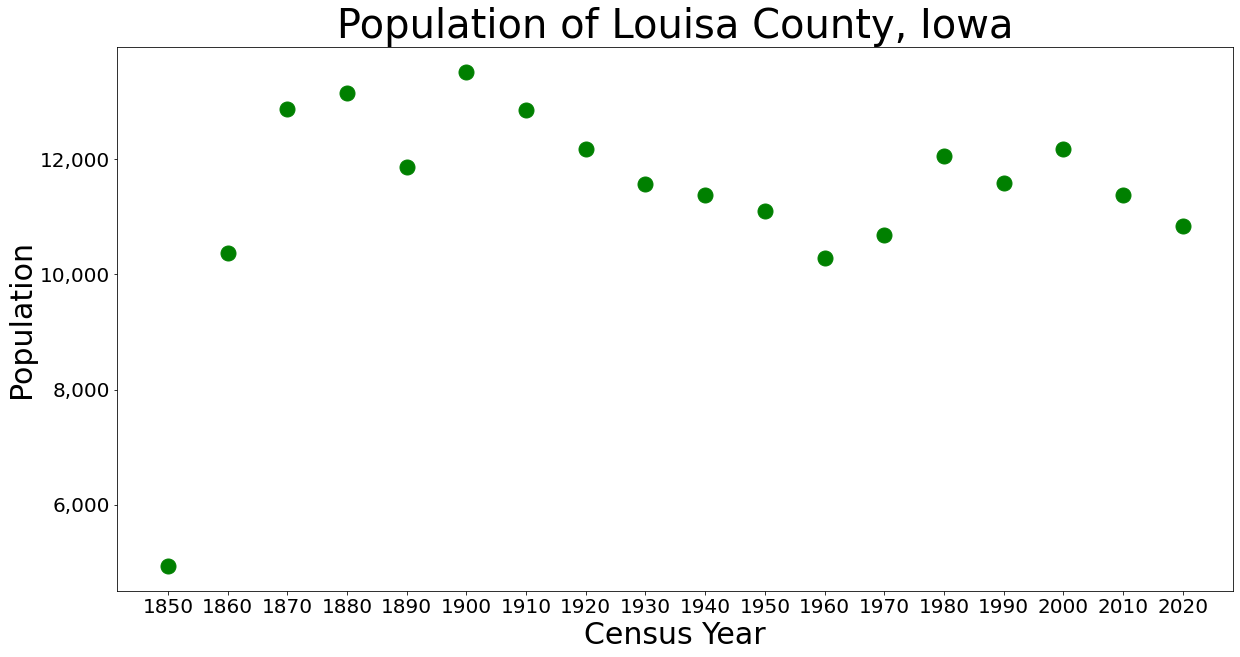
Population of Louisa County from the U.S. census data

As of the 2020 census, the county had a population of 10,837 with a population density of 26.0/sq mi (10.0/km^{2}). There were 4,712 housing units, of which 4,180 were occupied.

The median age was 42.1 years, with 22.7% of residents under the age of 18 and 19.8% of residents 65 years of age or older. For every 100 females there were 103.2 males, and for every 100 females age 18 and over there were 101.2 males age 18 and over.

There were 4,180 households, of which 30.0% had children under the age of 18 living in them. Of all households, 54.8% were married-couple households, 17.1% were households with a male householder and no spouse or partner present, and 20.8% were households with a female householder and no spouse or partner present. About 25.2% of all households were made up of individuals and 12.5% had someone living alone who was 65 years of age or older.

There were 4,712 housing units, of which 11.3% were vacant. Among occupied housing units, 79.2% were owner-occupied and 20.8% were renter-occupied. The homeowner vacancy rate was 0.7% and the rental vacancy rate was 8.3%.

<0.1% of residents lived in urban areas, while 100.0% lived in rural areas.

The racial and ethnic composition as recorded by the 2020 census is summarized in the table below, with 81.5% of residents identifying as White and 15.9% identifying as Hispanic or Latino of any race.

Louisa County Racial Composition
Race	Number	Percent
White (NH)	8,485	78.3%
Black or African American (NH)	73	0.7%
Native American (NH)	11	0.1%
Asian (NH)	265	2.5%
Pacific Islander (NH)	0	0%
Other/Mixed (NH)	275	2.54%
Hispanic or Latino	1,728	16%

=== 2010 census ===
As of the 2010 census recorded a population of 11,387 in the county, with a population density of 28.3/sq mi (10.9/km^{2}). There were 5,002 housing units, of which 4,346 were occupied.

=== 2000 census ===
As of the 2000 census, there were 12,183 people, 4,519 households, and 3,316 families residing in the county. The population density was 30 inhabitants per square mile (12/km^{2}). There were 5,133 housing units at an average density of 13 per square mile (5.0/km^{2}). The racial makeup of the county was 93.91% White, 0.25% Black or African American, 0.18% Native American, 0.20% Asian, 0.02% Pacific Islander, 4.56% from other races, and 0.88% from two or more races. 12.62% of the population were Hispanic or Latino of any race.

There were 4,519 households, out of which 35.00% had children under the age of 18 living with them, 61.30% were married couples living together, 8.20% had a female householder with no husband present, and 26.60% were non-families. 22.50% of all households were made up of individuals, and 10.40% had someone living alone who was 65 years of age or older. The average household size was 2.66 and the average family size was 3.11.

In the county, the population was spread out, with 27.70% under the age of 18, 7.90% from 18 to 24, 28.70% from 25 to 44, 21.70% from 45 to 64, and 14.10% who were 65 years of age or older. The median age was 36 years. For every 100 females, there were 98.90 males. For every 100 females age 18 and over, there were 96.00 males.

The median income for a household in the county was $39,086, and the median income for a family was $43,972. Males had a median income of $31,293 versus $22,085 for females. The per capita income for the county was $17,644. About 7.00% of families and 9.30% of the population were below the poverty line, including 12.40% of those under age 18 and 7.90% of those age 65 or over.

== Communities ==
=== Cities ===
- Columbus City
- Columbus Junction
- Cotter
- Fredonia
- Grandview
- Letts
- Morning Sun
- Oakville
- Wapello

=== Unincorporated community ===
- Cairo
- Toolesboro

=== Population ranking ===
The population ranking of the following table is based on the 2020 census of Louisa County.

† county seat

Rank	City/Town/etc.	Municipal type	Population (2020 Census)
1	† Wapello	City	2,084
2	Columbus Junction	City	1,830
3	Morning Sun	City	752
4	Grandview	City	437
5	Columbus City	City	392
6	Letts	City	363
7	Fredonia	City	222
8	Oakville	City	200
9	Cotter	City	39

== Government ==
=== Townships ===
- Columbus City
- Concord
- Eliot
- Elm Grove
- Grandview
- Jefferson
- Marshall
- Morning Sun
- Oakland
- Port Louisa
- Union
- Wapello

== Politics ==
United States presidential election results for Louisa County, Iowa
Year	Republican		Democratic		Third party(ies)	
Year	No.	%	No.	%	No.	%
1896	2,035	59.12%	1,334	38.76%	73	2.12%
1900	2,185	63.30%	1,172	33.95%	95	2.75%
1904	2,147	72.61%	663	22.42%	147	4.97%
1908	2,025	65.92%	978	31.84%	69	2.25%
1912	1,070	36.36%	881	29.94%	992	33.71%
1916	1,876	62.26%	1,081	35.88%	56	1.86%
1920	3,560	77.49%	932	20.29%	102	2.22%
1924	2,952	64.89%	643	14.13%	954	20.97%
1928	3,275	68.80%	1,457	30.61%	28	0.59%
1932	2,045	40.99%	2,856	57.25%	88	1.76%
1936	2,655	47.28%	2,859	50.92%	101	1.80%
1940	3,330	59.18%	2,247	39.93%	50	0.89%
1944	2,745	58.67%	1,894	40.48%	40	0.85%
1948	2,420	54.64%	1,945	43.92%	64	1.45%
1952	3,675	68.45%	1,673	31.16%	21	0.39%
1956	3,184	63.07%	1,858	36.81%	6	0.12%
1960	3,036	60.67%	1,966	39.29%	2	0.04%
1964	1,845	41.17%	2,624	58.56%	12	0.27%
1968	2,529	56.40%	1,632	36.40%	323	7.20%
1972	2,806	61.31%	1,707	37.30%	64	1.40%
1976	2,284	51.43%	2,089	47.04%	68	1.53%
1980	2,530	55.19%	1,700	37.09%	354	7.72%
1984	2,623	57.36%	1,927	42.14%	23	0.50%
1988	2,060	47.03%	2,268	51.78%	52	1.19%
1992	1,691	34.91%	2,091	43.17%	1,062	21.92%
1996	1,565	36.61%	2,081	48.68%	629	14.71%
2000	2,207	47.60%	2,294	49.47%	136	2.93%
2004	2,572	52.32%	2,297	46.72%	47	0.96%
2008	2,314	47.02%	2,523	51.27%	84	1.71%
2012	2,420	48.71%	2,452	49.36%	96	1.93%
2016	3,069	61.28%	1,648	32.91%	291	5.81%
2020	3,500	65.64%	1,726	32.37%	106	1.99%
2024	3,584	69.70%	1,480	28.78%	78	1.52%

== See also ==
- National Register of Historic Places listings in Louisa County, Iowa
