= Columbus City Township, Louisa County, Iowa =

Township in Louisa County, Iowa, US

Coordinates: 41.2556°N 91.3940°W

Columbus City Township is a township in Louisa County, Iowa. It was organized in 1841.
