= Union Township, Louisa County, Iowa =

Township in Louisa County, Iowa, U.S.

Coordinates: 41.350°N 91.444°W

Union Township is a township in Louisa County, Iowa.

== History ==
Union Township was organized in 1854.
