= Eliot Township, Louisa County, Iowa =

Township in Louisa County, Iowa, U.S.

Coordinates: 41.1°N 91.5°W

Eliot Township is a township in Louisa County, Iowa.

== History ==
Eliot Township was organized in 1856.
