= Port Louisa Township, Louisa County, Iowa =

Township in Louisa County, Iowa, U.S.

Coordinates: 41.254°N 91.128°W

Port Louisa Township is a township in Louisa County, Iowa.

== History ==
Port Louisa Township was organized in 1856.
