= Concord Township, Louisa County, Iowa =

Township in Louisa County, Iowa, U.S.

Coordinates: 41.295°N 91.297°W

Concord Township is a township in Louisa County, Iowa.

== History ==
Concord Township was organized in 1853 as a division of Fredonia Township, Louisa County, Iowa.
