= Elm Grove Township, Louisa County, Iowa =

Township in Louisa County, Iowa, U.S.

Coordinates: 41.196°N 91.367°W

Elm Grove Township is a township in Louisa County, Iowa.

== History ==
Elm Grove Township was organized in 1857.
