= The Beautiful Girls =

Australian reggae band

- The Beautiful Girls in 2007

Background information
- Origin: Sydney, New South Wales, Australia
- Genres: Roots; pop rock; alternative; reggae; dub
- Years active: 2001–2012; 2014–present
- Labels: Independent/MGM Distribution; San Dumo; Die!Boredom
- Members: Mat McHugh; Paulie Bromley; Paul Derricott
- Past members: Mitchell Connelly; Clay MacDonald; Felipe Kmiecik; Bruce Braybrooke; Ian Pritchett
- Website: thebeautifulgirls.com

The Beautiful Girls are an Australian roots music group founded in Sydney in 2001 by Mat McHugh, Clay MacDonald, and Mitchell Connelly. They have released three extended plays, Morning Sun (2002), Goodtimes (2002), and The Weight of the World (2004), plus five studio albums, Learn Yourself (2003), We're Already Gone (2005), Ziggurats (2007), Spooks (2010), and Dancehall Days (2014). The last four albums have all peaked into the top 20 on the ARIA Albums Chart. Spooks and Dancehall Days also debuted at No. 1 on the Australian Independent Chart and No. 7&5 on the American Billboard Reggae Albums Chart, respectively. Their single "I Thought About You" reached No. 60 on the ARIA Singles Chart.

Songwriter/producer/multi-instrumentalist Mat McHugh has issued two solo albums, Seperatista! (2008) and Love Come Save Me (2012), as well as an EP, Go Don't Stop (2011).

Clay MacDonald fronts multiple bands, including The Orange Bird, The Lung, The Guilty Conscience, The Oort Cloud, and Hungdonkey. He also plays in fuzz rock group Valley Floor.

Mitchell Connelly has written and recorded under the name aliTTLErowBOAT.

MacDonald and Connelly write and record instrumental hip-hop under the name The Undertones. They also have a noise rock band named Salmon Facade. The pair provided the rhythm section on Angus & Julia Stone's first two EPs and first two albums, and toured extensively with the siblings from 2007 to 2009.

By 2014, the Beautiful Girls had toured the world multiple times – including Japan, Canada, Brazil, and the United States – and their total album sales had reached 350,000.

== History ==
The Beautiful Girls formed in Sydney in 2001 as a roots music group with Mitch Connelly on drums and percussion, Clay MacDonald on bass guitar and backing vocals, and Mat McHugh on lead vocals and guitar. Previously, McHugh had travelled to New York to pursue a music career, and he returned to Sydney to record some demos, at which point he founded the band. McHugh chose the name to counter the "macho posturing and the associated tough-guy band names. And a beautiful girl was just about the sweetest, most appropriate opposite I could think of". In March 2002, the Beautiful Girls issued their debut eight-track extended play, Morning Sun, on a self-funded independent label, which was distributed by MGM Distribution. The track "Periscopes" received airplay on national radio station Triple J. McHugh explained why they chose not to sign with any major label, saying "It's the way we've always been as a band and the way I've always wanted to do things. I like artists and musicians who I get the vibe of where they're coming from and an understanding of what kinda person they are. For me it's just a way of conversing back and forth with people". In November 2002, a second EP, Goodtimes, was issued, containing five tracks.

On 22 September 2003, the group released their debut studio album, Learn Yourself, which was co-produced by McHugh and Ian Pritchett. United States pop-rocker Mason Jennings provided lead vocals on the track "Freedom (Part 2)", and former Soul Asylum drummer Ian Mussington provided percussion on two tracks.

In 2004, the Beautiful Girls toured Japan, Canada, and the US. In January 2005, they released a four-track EP, The Weight of the World, where the title track was a "rollicking, dance hall tune, featuring, wails of melodica and a tinge of hip hop, [it] has already been added to rotation on JJJ". On their Australian tour promoting the release, they were joined by Brazilian Felipe Kmiecik on harmonica. On 4 July of that year, with Kimieck aboard on melodica, harmonica, and keyboards, the band recorded their second album, We're Already Gone, which peaked at No. 19 on the ARIA Albums Chart. It was produced by McHugh and Pritchett on the Beautiful Girls' own label, San Dumo Records, and distributed by MGM. The special edition of We're Already Gone includes a four-track DVD, 'Legged, with live video footage and film clips. The album features guest vocals by Julia Stone (of Angus & Julia Stone). In October 2006, the group issued a compilation album titled Water.

In late 2005, Kmiecik returned to Rio Negrinho, Brazil, to raise his newborn daughter. In 2006, Connelly left the band, citing irreconcilable differences with McHugh. In February 2007, MacDonald left the band as well, for similar reasons. MacDonald and Connelly subsequently worked on Angus & Julia Stone's albums and EPs while working on their hip hop project The Undertones. They then went on to follow their own projects, Connelly with aliTTLErowBOAT and MacDonald with The Orange Bird, Hungdonkey, and later, The Lung, The Oort Cloud, and The Guilty Conscience. In 2009, Kmiecik, as Felipe Harp, issued a solo EP, Back on the Road. The Beautiful Girls continued with McHugh now on lead vocals, lead guitar, bass guitar, keyboards, melodica, and percussion – he was joined by (The Beautiful Girls producer) Pritchett on bass guitar, backing vocals, guitar, keyboards, and percussion, and Bruce Braybrooke (ex–Frenzal Rhomb, The Fantastic Leslie) on drums, percussion, and vocals. On 14 May 2007, the group issued their third album, Ziggurats, on Die!Boredom Records, with McHugh and Pritchett co-producing. The album peaked at No. 21 on the Australian albums chart. It spawned the single "I Thought About You", which peaked at No. 60 on the ARIA Singles Chart. The Sydney Morning Herald felt the group's "sound is punchier and more angular. Lyrically, McHugh has drifted away from the personal politics of relationships to a wider political outlook. The album, in particular the stand-out 'I Thought About You', are a convincing departure from the 'roots' scene".

At the APRA Music Awards of 2008, "I Thought About You" – written by McHugh – was nominated for 'Blues & Roots Work of the Year'. By 2008, the Beautiful Girls had toured Japan, Europe (including the UK), Brazil, the US, and Canada. McHugh launched his solo career, however, late in 2008, a motorcycle accident in Los Angeles forced him to be hospitalised and delayed the release of his album Seperatista!. By 2010, the Beautiful Girls had toured the world twelve times and their total album sales had reached 285,000.

On 25 May 2010, the Beautiful Girls, with the line-up of McHugh and Braybrooke joined by Paulie Bromley on bass guitar, issued their fourth album, Spooks. It peaked at No. 18 on the ARIA Albums Chart, and debuted at No. 1 on the Australian Independent Chart. In June of that year, it reached No. 7 on the Billboard Reggae Albums Chart. In September, a US tour was interrupted when McHugh was diagnosed with a ruptured appendix. In April 2012, McHugh's second solo album, Love Come Save Me, was released on his website as a free download.

By late 2012, McHugh established a new band name, Mat. McHugh and the Seperatista Soundsystem, which first toured in January 2013.

== Band members ==
Current

- Mat McHugh – vocals, guitar
- Paulie Bromley – bass guitar
- Paul Derricott – drums

Past

- Mitchell Connelly – drums, percussion
- Clay MacDonald – bass guitar, vocals, xylophone, recorder
- Felipe Kmiecik – harmonica, melodica, piano
- Bruce Braybrooke – drums
- Ian Pritchett – bass guitar, vocals

== Discography ==
=== Studio albums ===
Title	Details	Peak chart positions	Certification
Title	Details	AUS	Certification
Learn Yourself	Released: 22 September 2003; Label: The Beautiful Girls (i008); Format: CD, digital download	80	ARIA: Gold
We're Already Gone	Released: 4 July 2005; Label: San Dumo Records (i008); Format: CD, digital download	19	
Ziggurats	Released: 14 May 2007; Label: Die!Boredom Records (d!b001); Format: CD, digital download	21	ARIA: Gold
Spooks	Released: 25 May 2010; Label: Die!Boredom Records (d!b010); Format: CD, digital download	18	
Dancehall Days	Released: 3 October 2014; Label: MGM (SSSystem 001); Format: CD, digital download, streaming	30	

=== EPs ===
Title	Details
Morning Sun	Released: January 2002; Label: The Beautiful Girls (i001); Format: CD, digital download
Goodtimes	Released: November 2002; Label: The Beautiful Girls (i002); Format: CD, digital download

=== Compilation albums ===
Title	Details
Water	Released: October 2006 (USA); Label: Cornerstone R.A.S. (CRAS-CD-057); Format: CD, digital download
Roots: The Best of... So Far...	Released: 2010 (Brazil); Label: Urban Jungle (OIM003); Format: CD, digital download
Seaside Highlife (Greatest Hits: Vol. 1)	Released: 2019; Label: Die!Boredom Records (DB017V ); Format: Vinyl

=== Charting singles ===
List of charting singles, with Australian chart positions
Title	Year	Peak chart positions	Album
Title	Year	AUS	Album
"Morning Sun"	2002	87	Morning Sun
"Weight of the World"	2004	54	
"Thought About You"	2007	60	Ziggurats

== Awards and nominations ==
=== AIR Awards ===
The Australian Independent Record Awards (commonly known informally as AIR Awards) is an annual awards night to recognise, promote and celebrate the success of Australia's Independent Music sector.

Year	Nominee / work	Award	Result
2007	Ziggurats	Best Independent Blues and Roots Album	Nominated
2010	Spooks	Best Independent Blues and Roots Album	Nominated

=== APRA Awards ===
The APRA Awards have been presented annually from 1982 by the Australasian Performing Right Association (APRA), "honouring composers and songwriters".

Year	Nominee / work	Award	Result
2006	"Ashes" (Mat McHugh)	Most Performed Blues & Roots Work	Nominated
2006	"Let's Take the Long Way Home" (Mat McHugh)	Most Performed Blues & Roots Work	Nominated
2008	"I Thought About You" (Mat McHugh)	Blues & Roots Work of the Year	Nominated
2011	"10:10" (Mat McHugh)	Blues & Roots Work of the Year	Nominated
2011	"Don't Wait" (Mat McHugh)	Blues & Roots Work of the Year	Nominated

=== ARIA Music Awards ===
The ARIA Music Awards is an annual awards ceremony that recognises excellence, innovation, and achievement across all genres of Australian music.

Year	Nominee / work	Award	Result
2005	We're Already Gone	Best Blues & Roots Album	Nominated

=== J Award ===
The J Awards are an annual series of Australian music awards that were established by the Australian Broadcasting Corporation's youth-focused radio station Triple J. They commenced in 2005.

Year	Nominee / work	Award	Result
2005	We're Already Gone	Australian Album of the Year	Nominated

=== Inside Film Awards ===
Year	Nominee / work	Award	Result
2007	"I Thought About You"	Best Video	Nominated
