= Jefferson Township, Louisa County, Iowa =

Township in Louisa County, Iowa, U.S.

Coordinates: 41.149°N 91.096°W

Jefferson Township is a township in Louisa County, Iowa.

== History ==
Jefferson Township was organized in 1841.
