= Fredonia, Iowa =

- City
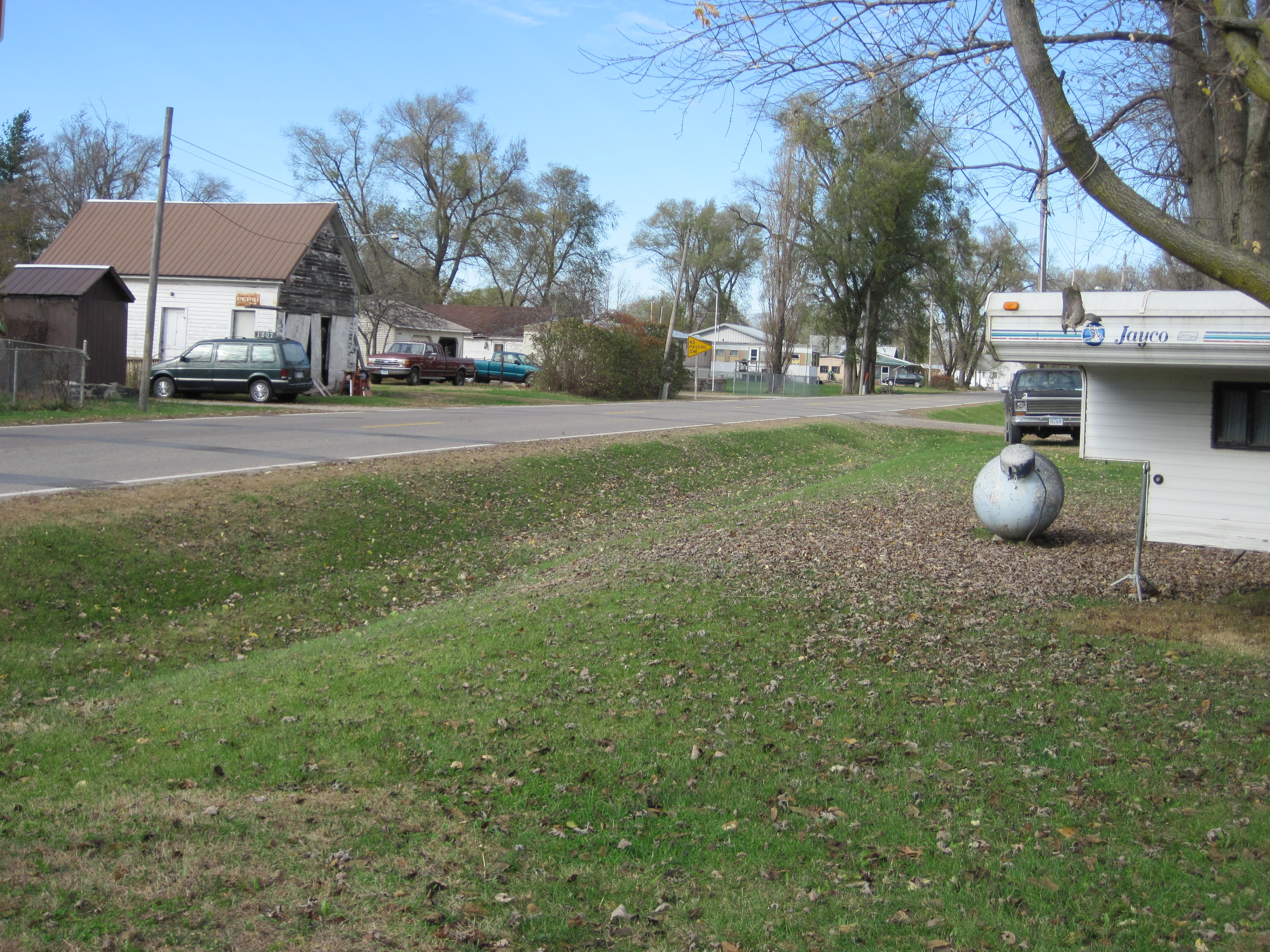
- Fredonia residential area

- Location of Fredonia, Iowa
- Coordinates: 41°17′6″N 91°20′17″W
- Country: United States
- State: Iowa
- County: Louisa

Area
  - Total: 0.15 sq mi (0.39 km^{2})
  - Land: 0.15 sq mi (0.39 km^{2})
  - Water: 0 sq mi (0.00 km^{2})
- Elevation: 594 ft (181 m)

Population (2020)
  - Total: 222
  - Density: 1,474.6/sq mi (569.34/km^{2})
- Time zone: UTC-6 (Central (CST))
  - Summer (DST): UTC-5 (CDT)
- ZIP code: 52738
- Area code: 319
- FIPS code: 19-29055
- GNIS feature ID: 2394818
- Website: fredoniaiowa.gov

Fredonia is a city in Louisa County, Iowa, United States. The population was 222 at the time of the 2020 census. It is part of the Muscatine Micropolitan Statistical Area.

== History ==
Fredonia was laid out in 1836, by Alvin Clark, who had a squatters claim on the land and was surveyed by John Gilliland. It is located on the east side of the Iowa River, immediately below the junction of the Iowa and Cedar rivers. It is a part of section 20, township 75, range 4 west. It is said Alvin Clark and his brother Gibbs were the first settlers in Fredonia. As such it is one of the oldest continuously-incorporated towns in Iowa. It is sometimes claimed that Fredonia came near being the capital of Iowa and only lost by 1 vote. This however, was not a truly serious consideration in the House of Representatives, as many other names were being brought up at the time.

== Geography ==
Fredonia is located just east of the confluence of the Iowa River and the Cedar River. The community of Columbus Junction lies to the southwest across the Iowa River.

According to the United States Census Bureau, the city has a total area of 0.17 square miles (0.44 km^{2}), all land.

== Demographics ==
Historical populations
Year	Pop.	±%
1930	165	—
1940	147	−10.9%
1950	133	−9.5%
1960	147	+10.5%
1970	168	+14.3%
1980	224	+33.3%
1990	201	−10.3%
2000	251	+24.9%
2010	244	−2.8%
2020	222	−9.0%
Source:"U.S. Census website". United States Census Bureau. and Iowa Data Center; Source: U.S. Decennial Census

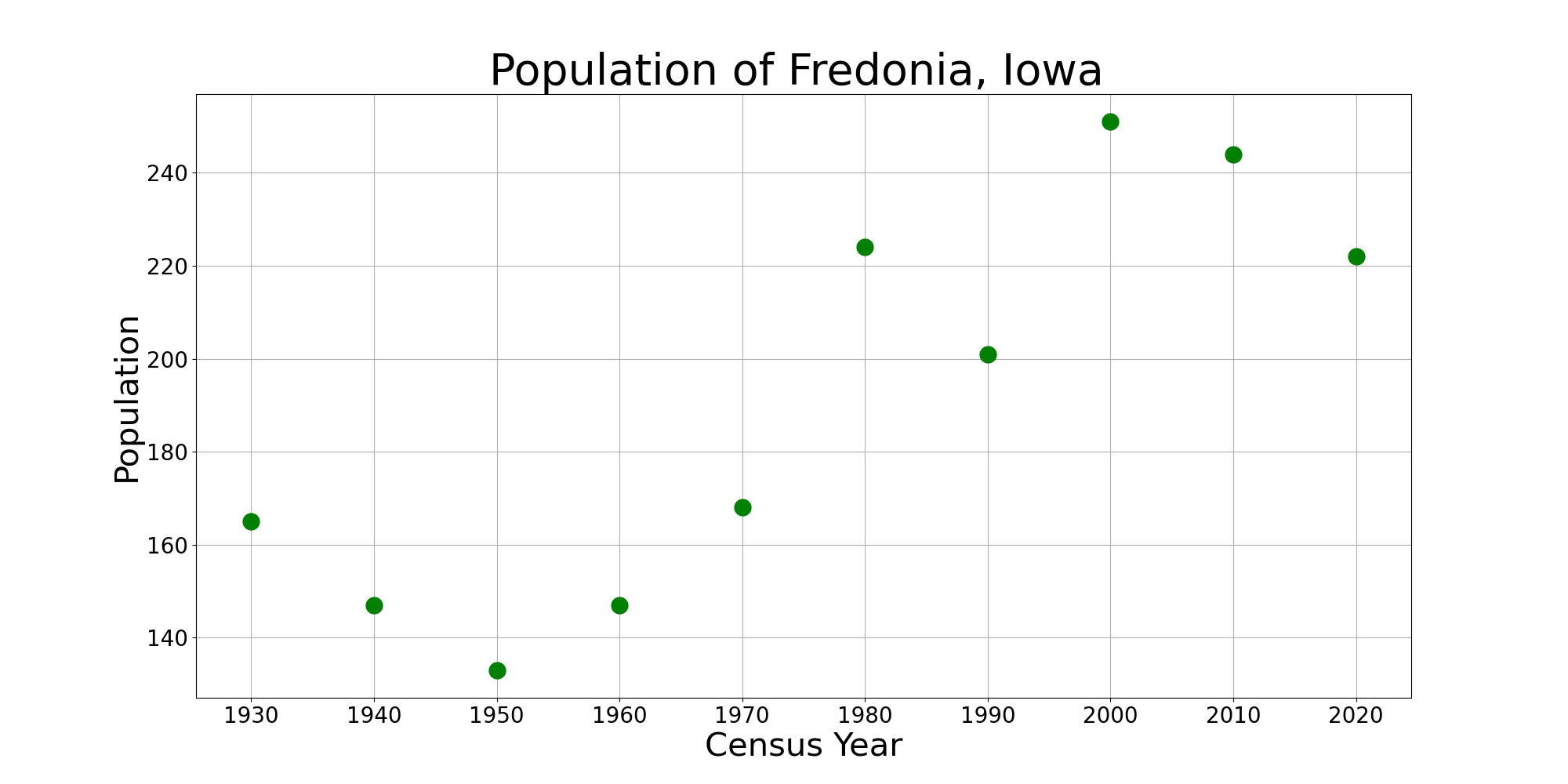
The population of Fredonia, Iowa from US census data

=== 2020 census ===
As of the census of 2020, there were 222 people, 80 households, and 59 families residing in the city. The population density was 1,474.6 inhabitants per square mile (569.3/km^{2}). There were 80 housing units at an average density of 531.4 per square mile (205.2/km^{2}). The racial makeup of the city was 56.3% White, 1.8% Black or African American, 0.5% Native American, 14.9% Asian, 0.0% Pacific Islander, 20.3% from other races and 6.3% from two or more races. Hispanic or Latino persons of any race comprised 36.0% of the population.

Of the 80 households, 42.5% of which had children under the age of 18 living with them, 48.8% were married couples living together, 11.2% were cohabitating couples, 16.2% had a female householder with no spouse or partner present and 23.8% had a male householder with no spouse or partner present. 26.2% of all households were non-families. 15.0% of all households were made up of individuals, 7.5% had someone living alone who was 65 years old or older.

The median age in the city was 38.8 years. 30.6% of the residents were under the age of 20; 4.1% were between the ages of 20 and 24; 21.6% were from 25 and 44; 31.5% were from 45 and 64; and 12.2% were 65 years of age or older. The gender makeup of the city was 53.2% male and 46.8% female.

=== 2010 census ===
As of the census of 2010, there were 244 people, 83 households, and 58 families residing in the city. The population density was 1,435.3 inhabitants per square mile (554.2/km^{2}). There were 93 housing units at an average density of 547.1 per square mile (211.2/km^{2}). The racial makeup of the city was 74.6% White, 0.4% African American, 2.0% Native American, 2.5% Asian, 19.3% from other races, and 1.2% from two or more races. Hispanic or Latino of any race were 43.9% of the population.

There were 83 households, of which 44.6% had children under the age of 18 living with them, 47.0% were married couples living together, 16.9% had a female householder with no husband present, 6.0% had a male householder with no wife present, and 30.1% were non-families. 24.1% of all households were made up of individuals, and 8.4% had someone living alone who was 65 years of age or older. The average household size was 2.94 and the average family size was 3.53.

The median age in the city was 29 years. 34.8% of residents were under the age of 18; 9.1% were between the ages of 18 and 24; 25.1% were from 25 to 44; 21.3% were from 45 to 64; and 9.8% were 65 years of age or older. The gender makeup of the city was 52.9% male and 47.1% female.

=== 2000 census ===
As of the census of 2000, there were 251 people, 87 households, and 64 families residing in the city. The population density was 1,635.7 inhabitants per square mile (631.5/km^{2}). There were 92 housing units at an average density of 599.5 per square mile (231.5/km^{2}). The racial makeup of the city was 86.06% White, 7.97% from other races, and 5.98% from two or more races. Hispanic or Latino of any race were 31.47% of the population.

There were 87 households, out of which 35.6% had children under the age of 18 living with them, 58.6% were married couples living together, 9.2% had a female householder with no husband present, and 25.3% were non-families. 24.1% of all households were made up of individuals, and 9.2% had someone living alone who was 65 years of age or older. The average household size was 2.89 and the average family size was 3.40.

32.3% are under the age of 18, 6.8% from 18 to 24, 28.3% from 25 to 44, 21.9% from 45 to 64, and 10.8% who were 65 years of age or older. The median age was 32 years. For every 100 females, there were 97.6 males. For every 100 females age 18 and over, there were 93.2 males.

The median income for a household in the city was $30,250, and the median income for a family was $28,750. Males had a median income of $25,625 versus $18,125 for females. The per capita income for the city was $15,380. About 7.6% of families and 6.8% of the population were below the poverty line, including 11.5% of those under the age of eighteen and 4.2% of those 65 or over.
