= Oakland Township, Louisa County, Iowa =

Township in Iowa, United States

Coordinates: 41.3761°N 91.4064°W

Oakland Township is a township in Louisa County, Iowa.

== History ==
Oakland Township was organized in 1854.
