= Samuel Nichols House =

Historic house in Iowa, United States

- U.S. National Register of Historic Places
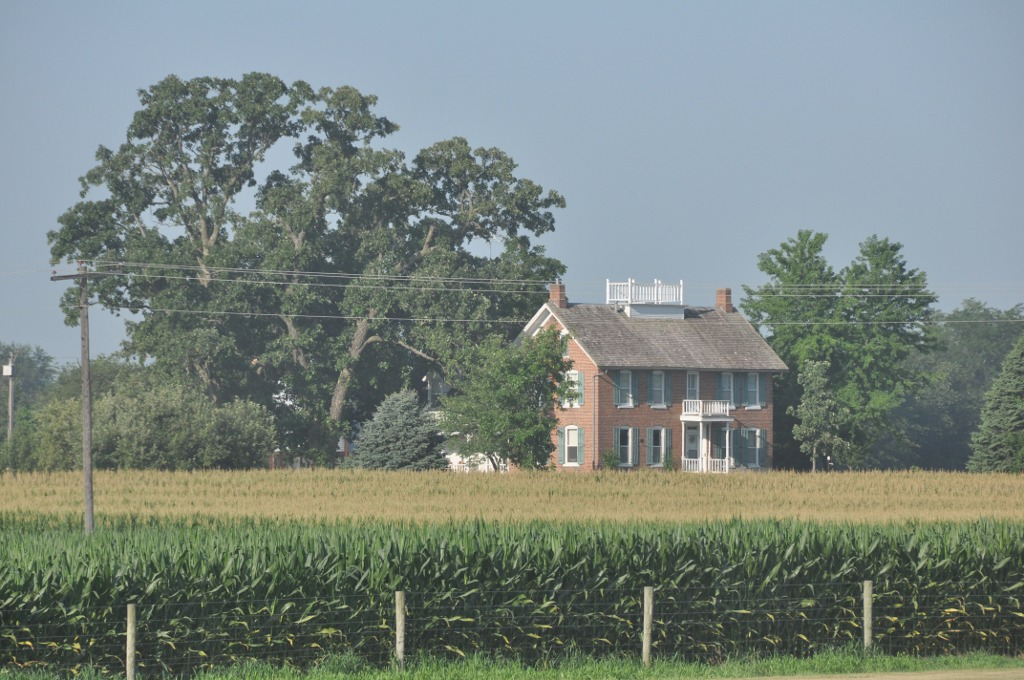

- Location within Iowa Location within the United States
- Location: East of Nichols off Iowa Highway 22
- Coordinates: 41°28′43″N 91°16′58″W
- Area: less than one acre
- Built: 1869-70
- Architectural style: Vernacular
- NRHP reference No.: 78001247
- Added to NRHP: March 31, 1978

Samuel Nichols House is a historic residence located in rural Muscatine County, Iowa, United States, near the town of Nichols. It has been listed on the National Register of Historic Places since 1978.

== History ==
Samuel Nichols moved his family from Ohio to Iowa in the late 1830s. He built a log structure on this property that served as the family home, a post office, and occasionally as a store that catered to people who traveled between Iowa City and Muscatine. He had this house built between 1869 and 1870. He and his wife died within a year or so of its completion. The farm was passed down through the family and remained so until at least 1978 when it was nominated for the National Register of Historic Places. His son Benjamin founded the town of Nichols in 1871. It was named after Samuel who had invested heavily in the Burlington, Cedar Rapids and Northern Railroad and donated land for the depot around which the town developed. Benjamin operated a store in town before returning to farm here. His son Townsend inherited the farm from him.

== Architecture ==
The Nichols House is a typical 19th-century vernacular-style farm house with a single story wing on the back. The two-story, rectangular, brick structure is five bays wide with the main entrance in the center bay. The front porch is not the original. Chimneys are set at each end of the gable roof. The deck in the center of the roof is original to the house, but the railings are replacements.
