= Wapello Township, Louisa County, Iowa =

Township in Louisa County, Iowa, U.S.

Coordinates: 41.157°N 91.204°W

Wapello Township is a township in Louisa County, Iowa.

== History ==
Wapello Township was organized in 1841.
