= Morning Sun (EP) =

EP by The Beautiful Girls
- Released: January 1, 2002
- Genre: Roots
- Label: Independent; MGM Distribution

The Beautiful Girls chronology
Morning Sun (2002)	Goodtimes (2002)

Morning Sun is the 2002 EP from Australian three-piece band The Beautiful Girls. This was the debut album, an independent release, distributed by MGM Distribution.

== Track listing ==
1. "Periscopes" – 3:33
2. "All I Need" – 2:40
3. "Morning Sun" – 4:55
4. "The Reason Is" – 4:14
5. "Version" – 2:12
6. "Big Mama's Door" – 3:44
7. "On A Clear Day" – 6:21
8. "A Million Miles" – 3:13

The Single "Morning Sun" was also featured on a mountain biking film called "Roam" which was produced by The Collective.

== Personnel ==
- Mat McHugh – vocals and guitar
- Mitch Connelly – drums and percussion
- Clay MacDonald – bass, vocals, xylophone and recorder
