= Marshall Township, Louisa County, Iowa =

Township in Louisa County, Iowa, U.S.

Coordinates: 41.1708°N 91.3208°W

Marshall Township is a township in Louisa County, Iowa.

Its registered population as of 2020 is 168.

== History ==
Marshall Township was organized in 1856.
