= Columbus City, Iowa =

- City
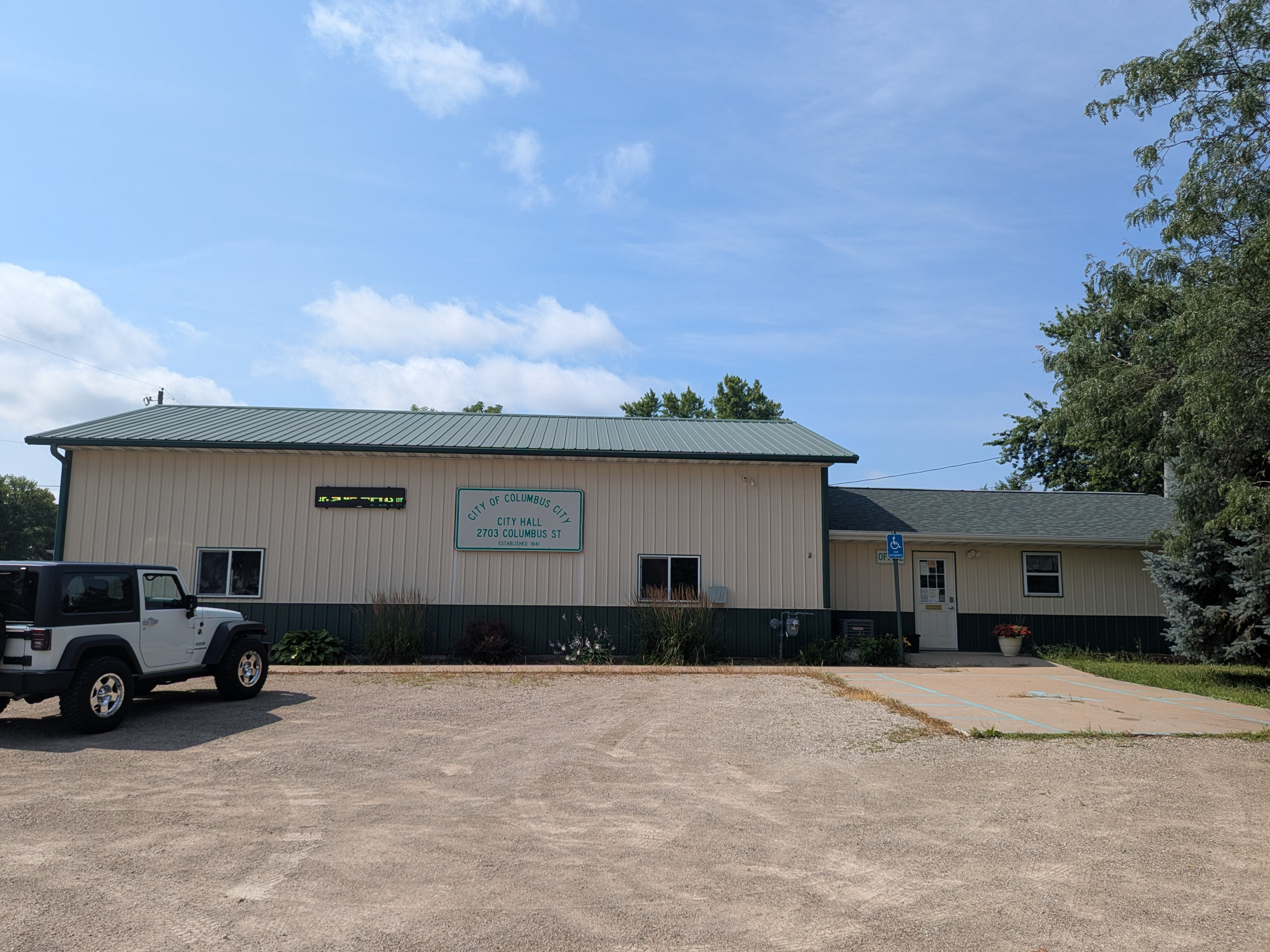
- City Hall

- Location of Columbus City, Iowa
- Coordinates: 41°15′33″N 91°22′33″W
- Country: United States
- State: Iowa
- County: Louisa

Area
  - Total: 0.24 sq mi (0.62 km^{2})
  - Land: 0.24 sq mi (0.62 km^{2})
  - Water: 0 sq mi (0.00 km^{2})
- Elevation: 758 ft (231 m)

Population (2020)
  - Total: 392
  - Density: 1,630.4/sq mi (629.51/km^{2})
- Time zone: UTC-6 (Central (CST))
  - Summer (DST): UTC-5 (CDT)
- ZIP code: 52737
- Area code: 319
- FIPS code: 19-15375
- GNIS feature ID: 2393611

Columbus City is a city in western Louisa County, Iowa, United States. The population was 392 at the 2020 census. It is part of the Muscatine Micropolitan Statistical Area.

== History ==
Columbus City was platted in the 1840s.

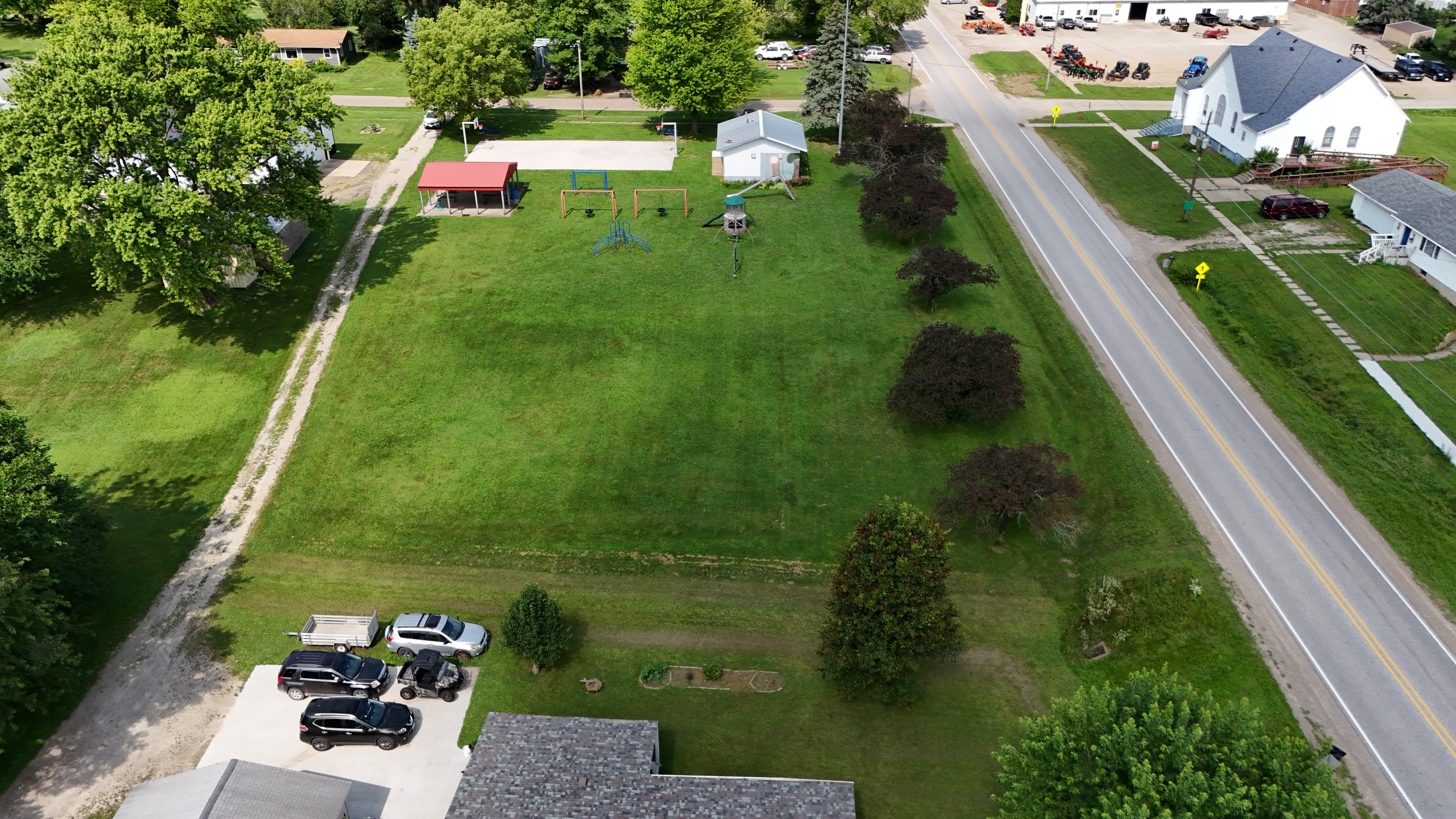
Columbus City city park

== Geography ==
Columbus City is located two miles southwest of Columbus Junction and the Iowa River.

According to the United States Census Bureau, the city has a total area of 0.24 square miles (0.62 km^{2}), all land.

== Demographics ==
Historical populations
Year	Pop.	±%
1880	605	—
1890	459	−24.1%
1900	388	−15.5%
1910	375	−3.4%
1920	346	−7.7%
1930	263	−24.0%
1940	326	+24.0%
1950	350	+7.4%
1960	327	−6.6%
1970	312	−4.6%
1980	367	+17.6%
1990	328	−10.6%
2000	376	+14.6%
2010	391	+4.0%
2020	392	+0.3%
Source:"U.S. Census website". United States Census Bureau. and Iowa Data Center; Source: U.S. Decennial Census

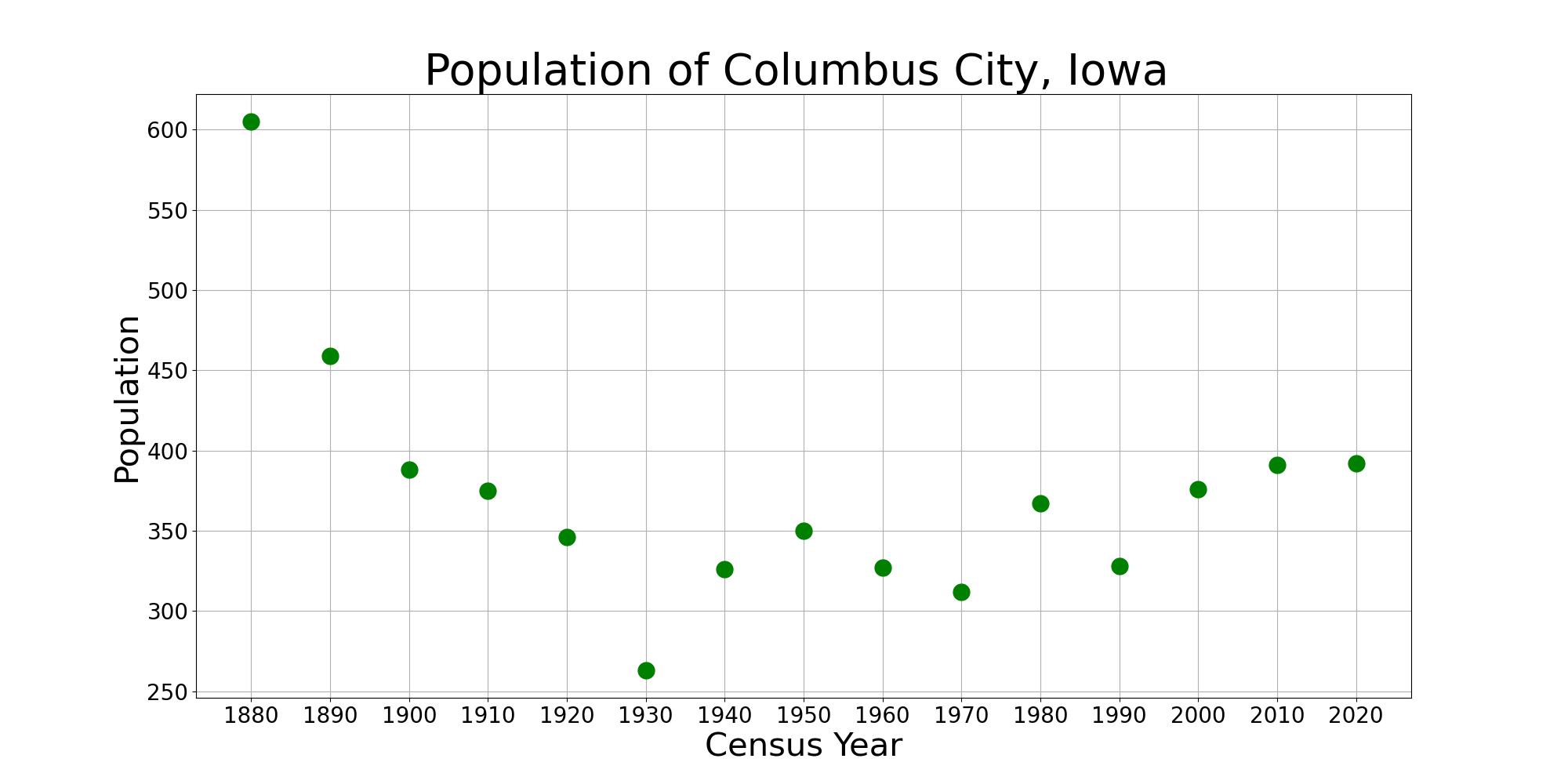
The population of Columbus City, Iowa from US census data

=== 2020 census ===
As of the census of 2020, there were 392 people, 137 households, and 94 families residing in the city. The population density was 1,630.4 inhabitants per square mile (629.5/km^{2}). There were 148 housing units at an average density of 615.6 per square mile (237.7/km^{2}). The racial makeup of the city was 52.0% White, 1.0% Black or African American, 0.8% Native American, 1.8% Asian, 0.0% Pacific Islander, 24.7% from other races and 19.6% from two or more races. Hispanic or Latino persons of any race comprised 56.1% of the population.

Of the 137 households, 30.7% of which had children under the age of 18 living with them, 53.3% were married couples living together, 9.5% were cohabitating couples, 16.8% had a female householder with no spouse or partner present and 20.4% had a male householder with no spouse or partner present. 31.4% of all households were non-families. 17.5% of all households were made up of individuals, 7.3% had someone living alone who was 65 years old or older.

The median age in the city was 39.7 years. 27.6% of the residents were under the age of 20; 5.4% were between the ages of 20 and 24; 25.3% were from 25 and 44; 26.5% were from 45 and 64; and 15.3% were 65 years of age or older. The gender makeup of the city was 53.8% male and 46.2% female.

=== 2010 census ===
At the 2010 census there were 391 people in 146 households, including 99 families, in the city. The population density was 1,629.2 inhabitants per square mile (629.0/km^{2}). There were 155 housing units at an average density of 645.8 per square mile (249.3/km^{2}). The racial makup of the city was 74.2% White, 3.1% Asian, 22.0% from other races, and 0.8% from two or more races. Hispanic or Latino of any race were 41.9%.

Of the 146 households 34.9% had children under the age of 18 living with them, 53.4% were married couples living together, 9.6% had a female householder with no husband present, 4.8% had a male householder with no wife present, and 32.2% were non-families. 24.7% of households were one person and 14.4% were one person aged 65 or older. The average household size was 2.68 and the average family size was 3.15.

The median age was 38.1 years. 27.6% of residents were under the age of 18; 9.3% were between the ages of 18 and 24; 24.4% were from 25 to 44; 23.3% were from 45 to 64; and 15.6% were 65 or older. The gender makeup of the city was 49.9% male and 50.1% female.

=== 2000 census ===
At the 2000 census there were 376 people in 135 households, including 91 families, in the city. The population density was 1,613.4 inhabitants per square mile (622.9/km^{2}). There were 138 housing units at an average density of 592.1 per square mile (228.6/km^{2}). The racial makup of the city was 74.47% White, 0.27% Asian, 22.87% from other races, and 2.39% from two or more races. Hispanic or Latino of any race were 33.24%.

Of the 135 households 35.6% had children under the age of 18 living with them, 53.3% were married couples living together, 10.4% had a female householder with no husband present, and 31.9% were non-families. 28.9% of households were one person and 17.8% were one person aged 65 or older. The average household size was 2.79 and the average family size was 3.49.

Age spread: 31.6% under the age of 18, 5.9% from 18 to 24, 30.6% from 25 to 44, 18.6% from 45 to 64, and 13.3% 65 or older. The median age was 35 years. For every 100 females, there were 103.2 males. For every 100 females age 18 and over, there were 96.2 males.

The median household income was $32,188 and the median family income was $39,167. Males had a median income of $25,000 versus $22,232 for females. The per capita income for the city was $12,468. About 7.3% of families and 5.2% of the population were below the poverty line, including 5.2% of those under age 18 and 6.7% of those age 65 or over.

== Notable person ==
- Margaret Cleaves (1848–1917), physician
