= Columbus Junction, Iowa =

- City
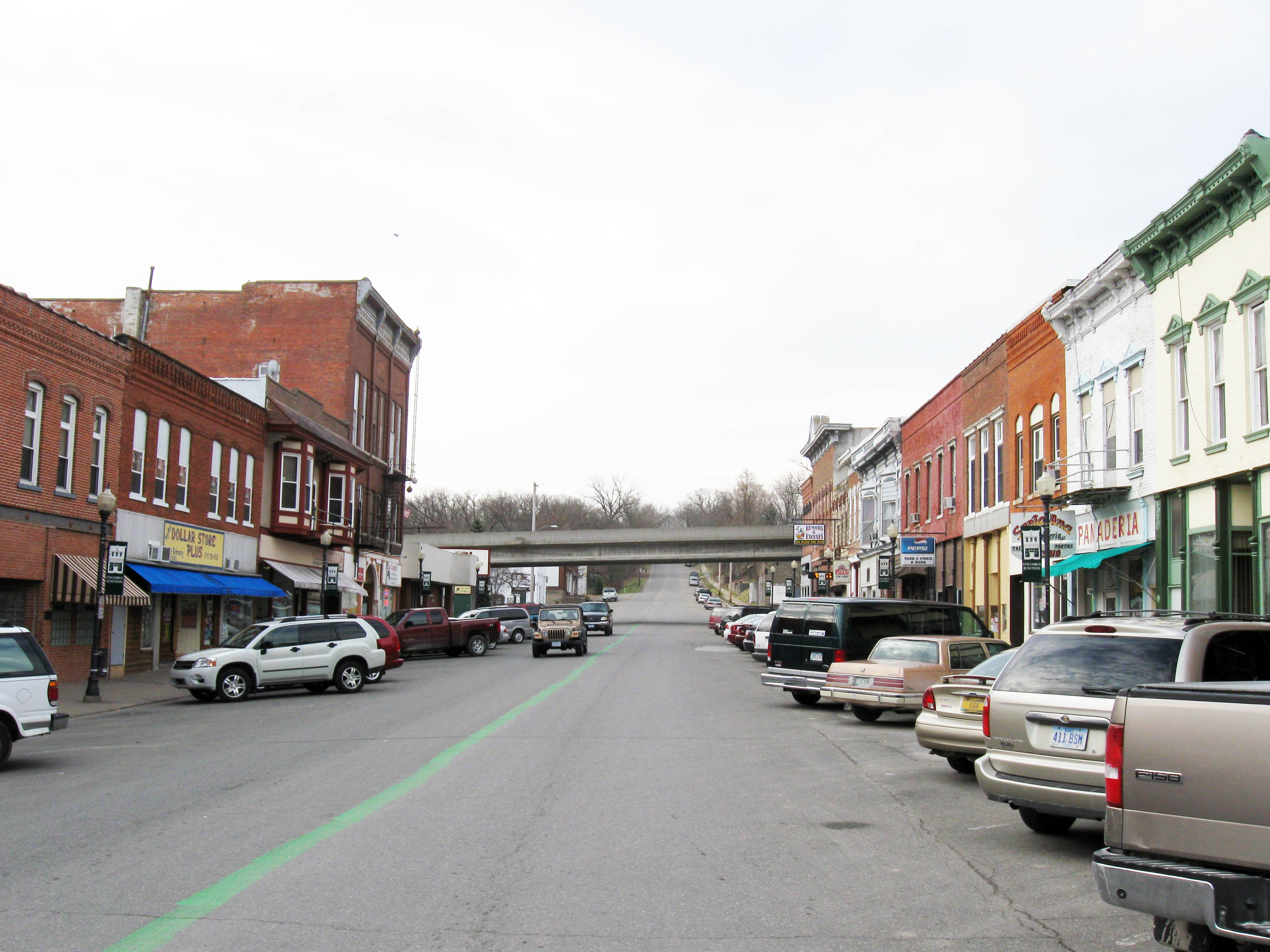
- Downtown Columbus Junction

- Location of Columbus Junction, Iowa
- Coordinates: 41°16′50″N 91°22′20″W
- Country: United States
- State: Iowa
- County: Louisa

Area
  - Total: 2.09 sq mi (5.42 km^{2})
  - Land: 2.09 sq mi (5.42 km^{2})
  - Water: 0 sq mi (0.00 km^{2})
- Elevation: 630 ft (190 m)

Population (2020)
  - Total: 1,830
  - Density: 873.8/sq mi (337.38/km^{2})
- Time zone: UTC-6 (Central (CST))
  - Summer (DST): UTC-5 (CDT)
- ZIP code: 52738
- Area code: 319
- FIPS code: 19-15420
- GNIS feature ID: 2393612
- Website: City of Columbus Junction website

Columbus Junction is a city in Louisa County, Iowa. The population was 1,830 at the 2020 census. It is part of the Muscatine Micropolitan Statistical Area.

Columbus Junction is home of the historic Swinging Bridge, found one block south of Highway 92 near downtown. The 262-foot-long steel cable and wood suspension bridge was built in 1922 as an elevated walkway connecting Third and Fourth streets.

The Columbus Community School District (which serves Columbus Junction, Columbus City, Fredonia, Cotter, Conesville, and other surrounding townships) is based in Columbus Junction. The school's colors are blue and white and their mascot is a wildcat.

The city's largest employer is a Tyson Foods meat processing plant located just north of the city on Highway 70.

== History ==
Columbus Junction began as a settlement located at the intersection of two railroad lines. The Chicago, Rock Island and Pacific Railroad (also known as the Rock Island [Line]) built an east–west line through the area in 1858, and the perpendicular north–south Burlington, Cedar Rapids and Minnesota Railroad (BCR&M) line was built in 1870.

The first local business, a restaurant and boarding house imported via the Rock Island from Muscatine, Iowa, opened the day after a BCR&M train made the inaugural stop and crossing of the newly completed intersection. Just a month later, on March 12, 1870, the town was platted.

Neighboring Columbus City had been established before the railroads arrived and both the Rock Island and BCR&M had built their lines over a mile's distance away. Because they had invested in the latter line, they were permitted to name the new town, and so it became Columbus Junction.

The largest sustained period of growth for Columbus Junction was from 1960 to 2000, driven primarily by job creation in meat processing. From 1961 to 1982 Rath Packing Company operated a hog processing plant just north of the city. In 1985 the facility reopened under the ownership of IBP, and in 2001 was bought by Tyson Foods.

Immigration has played a strong role in the history of Columbus Junction. The most recent wave of immigrants includes refugees from the Chin State of Myanmar (Burma). Many of them work in the meat processing plants.

The Iowa Flood of 2008 impacted Columbus Junction along with many other towns and cities. The damage dealt by the inundation affected 29 businesses and non-profits, but the community has since been able to recover.

== Geography ==
Columbus Junction is located between the cities of Columbus City and Fredonia. It lies at the confluence of two rivers, the Iowa and the Cedar.

According to the United States Census Bureau, the city has a total area of 2.19 square miles (5.67 km^{2}), all land.

=== Climate ===
Climate data for Columbus Junction, Iowa (1991–2020)
Month	Jan	Feb	Mar	Apr	May	Jun	Jul	Aug	Sep	Oct	Nov	Dec	Year
Mean daily maximum °F (°C)	29.9 (−1.2)	34.3 (1.3)	48.0 (8.9)	61.5 (16.4)	71.5 (21.9)	80.1 (26.7)	83.9 (28.8)	82.4 (28.0)	76.3 (24.6)	63.1 (17.3)	48.4 (9.1)	35.2 (1.8)	59.5 (15.3)
Daily mean °F (°C)	20.4 (−6.4)	24.1 (−4.4)	36.9 (2.7)	49.7 (9.8)	60.5 (15.8)	69.6 (20.9)	73.4 (23.0)	71.6 (22.0)	63.9 (17.7)	51.4 (10.8)	37.7 (3.2)	26.2 (−3.2)	48.8 (9.3)
Mean daily minimum °F (°C)	10.9 (−11.7)	14.0 (−10.0)	25.8 (−3.4)	37.9 (3.3)	49.5 (9.7)	59.2 (15.1)	62.9 (17.2)	60.7 (15.9)	51.5 (10.8)	39.7 (4.3)	26.9 (−2.8)	17.2 (−8.2)	38.0 (3.4)
Average precipitation inches (mm)	1.17 (30)	1.94 (49)	2.33 (59)	3.85 (98)	5.41 (137)	4.91 (125)	4.09 (104)	4.22 (107)	3.75 (95)	3.03 (77)	2.19 (56)	1.94 (49)	38.83 (986)
Average snowfall inches (cm)	9.5 (24)	7.1 (18)	5.3 (13)	1.6 (4.1)	0.0 (0.0)	0.0 (0.0)	0.0 (0.0)	0.0 (0.0)	0.0 (0.0)	0.2 (0.51)	1.3 (3.3)	6.3 (16)	31.3 (78.91)
Source: NOAA

== Demographics ==
Historical populations
Year	Pop.	±%
1860	519	—
1870	850	+63.8%
1880	793	−6.7%
1890	953	+20.2%
1900	1,099	+15.3%
1910	1,185	+7.8%
1920	988	−16.6%
1930	867	−12.2%
1940	975	+12.5%
1950	1,123	+15.2%
1960	1,016	−9.5%
1970	1,205	+18.6%
1980	1,429	+18.6%
1990	1,616	+13.1%
2000	1,900	+17.6%
2010	1,899	−0.1%
2020	1,830	−3.6%
Source:"U.S. Census website". United States Census Bureau. and Iowa Data Center; Source: U.S. Decennial Census

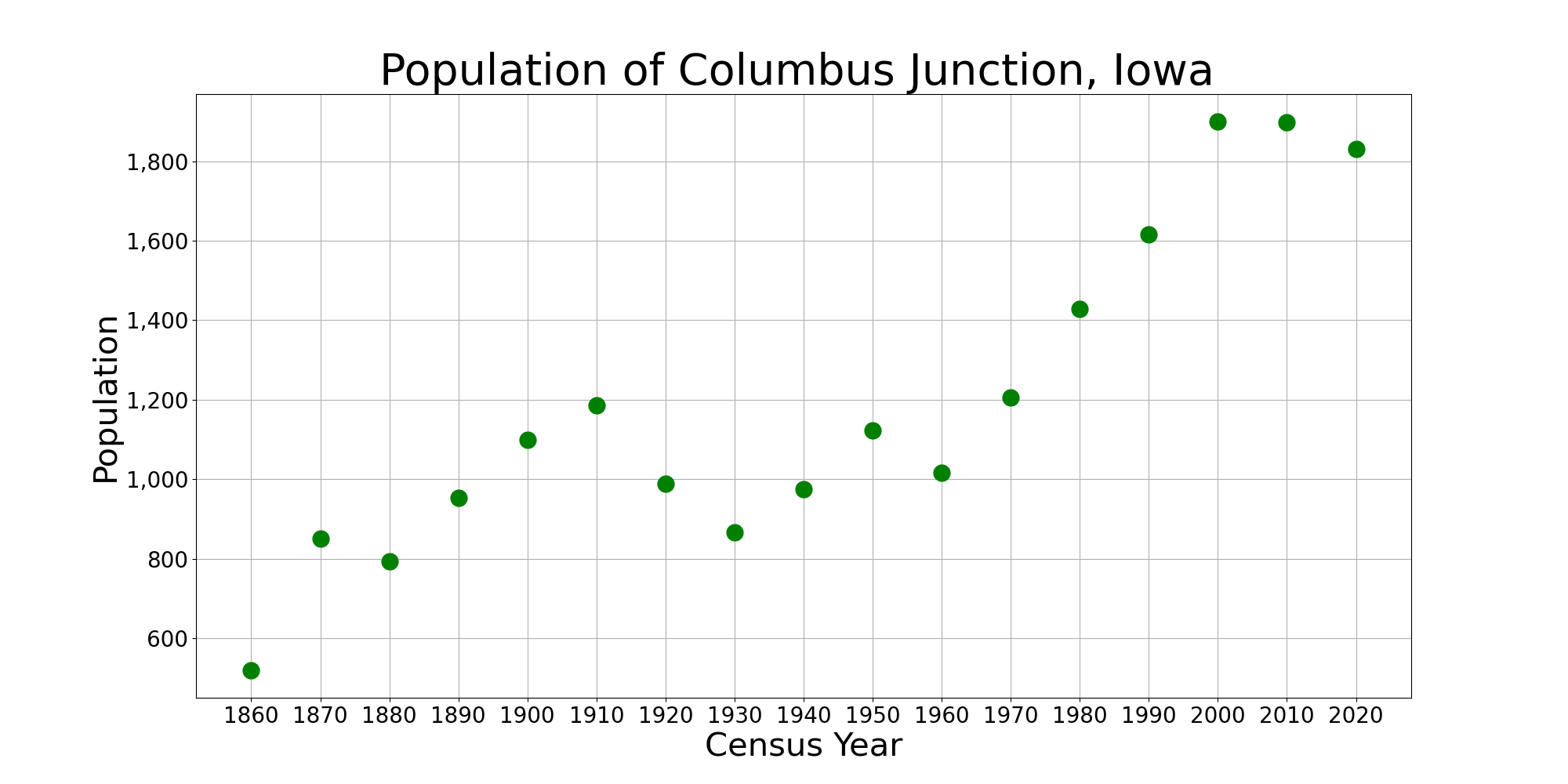
The population of Columbus Junction, Iowa from US census data

=== 2020 census ===
As of the 2020 census, there were 1,830 people, 655 households, and 438 families residing in the city. The population density was 873.8 inhabitants per square mile (337.4/km^{2}). There were 719 housing units at an average density of 343.3 per square mile (132.6/km^{2}).

There were 655 households, of which 34.7% had children under the age of 18 living in them. Of all households, 51.3% were married couples living together, 6.3% were cohabitating couples, 16.9% had a male householder with no spouse or partner present, and 25.5% had a female householder with no spouse or partner present. About 33.1% of households were non-families, 27.4% of all households were made up of individuals, and 15.3% had someone living alone who was 65 years of age or older.

The median age was 37.4 years. 28.0% of residents were under the age of 20; 6.0% were between the ages of 20 and 24; 26.5% were from 25 to 44; 22.1% were from 45 to 64; and 17.5% were 65 years of age or older. In addition, 25.7% of residents were under the age of 18. The gender makeup of the city was 50.5% male and 49.5% female. For every 100 females there were 102.0 males, and for every 100 females age 18 and over there were 98.7 males age 18 and over.

There were 719 housing units, of which 8.9% were vacant. The homeowner vacancy rate was 1.4% and the rental vacancy rate was 9.9%.

0.0% of residents lived in urban areas, while 100.0% lived in rural areas.

Racial composition as of the 2020 census
Race	Number	Percent
White	906	49.5%
Black or African American	26	1.4%
American Indian and Alaska Native	24	1.3%
Asian	187	10.2%
Native Hawaiian and Other Pacific Islander	0	0.0%
Some other race	425	23.2%
Two or more races	262	14.3%
Hispanic or Latino (of any race)	831	45.4%

=== 2010 census ===
As of the census of 2010, there were 1,899 people, 687 households, and 468 families residing in the city. The population density was 867.1 inhabitants per square mile (334.8/km^{2}). There were 760 housing units at an average density of 347.0 per square mile (134.0/km^{2}). The racial makeup of the city was 74.2% White, 1.6% African American, 0.3% Native American, 3.4% Asian, 17.4% from other races, and 3.0% from two or more races. Hispanic or Latino of any race were 48.0% of the population.

There were 687 households, of which 36.4% had children under the age of 18 living with them, 52.3% were married couples living together, 10.0% had a female householder with no husband present, 5.8% had a male householder with no wife present, and 31.9% were non-families. 26.6% of all households were made up of individuals, and 9.7% had someone living alone who was 65 years of age or older. The average household size was 2.72 and the average family size was 3.28.

The median age in the city was 35.9 years. 27.1% of residents were under the age of 18; 8.9% were between the ages of 18 and 24; 25.7% were from 25 to 44; 25.3% were from 45 to 64; and 13% were 65 years of age or older. The gender makeup of the city was 51.8% male and 48.2% female.

=== 2000 census ===
As of the census of 2000, there were 1,900 people, 691 households, and 487 families residing in the city. The population density was 879.6 inhabitants per square mile (339.6/km^{2}). There were 748 housing units at an average density of 346.3 per square mile (133.7/km^{2}). The racial makeup of the city was 85.32% White, 0.58% African American, 0.05% Native American, 0.11% Asian, 12.37% from other races, and 1.58% from two or more races. Hispanic or Latino of any race were 39.00% of the population.

There were 691 households, out of which 37.2% had children under the age of 18 living with them, 55.3% were married couples living together, 9.3% had a female householder with no husband present, and 29.5% were non-families. 26.3% of all households were made up of individuals, and 11.7% had someone living alone who was 65 years of age or older. The average household size was 2.68 and the average family size was 3.24.

28.6% are under the age of 18, 8.9% from 18 to 24, 28.9% from 25 to 44, 19.8% from 45 to 64, and 13.7% who were 65 years of age or older. The median age was 34 years. For every 100 females, there were 97.1 males. For every 100 females age 18 and over, there were 91.3 males.

The median income for a household in the city was $33,167, and the median income for a family was $42,188. Males had a median income of $27,841 versus $22,566 for females. The per capita income for the city was $16,314. About 9.7% of families and 11.2% of the population were below the poverty line, including 13.7% of those under age 18 and 8.2% of those age 65 or over.

== Notable people ==
- Bill Orr, former First Gentleman of Nebraska (1987–1991), raised in Columbus Junction.
- Karl Weber, television and radio actor who starred in Maverick, Perry Mason, Dr. Kildare and other shows

== See also ==
- Impact of the COVID-19 pandemic on the meat industry in the United States
