= Morning Sun, Iowa =

- City
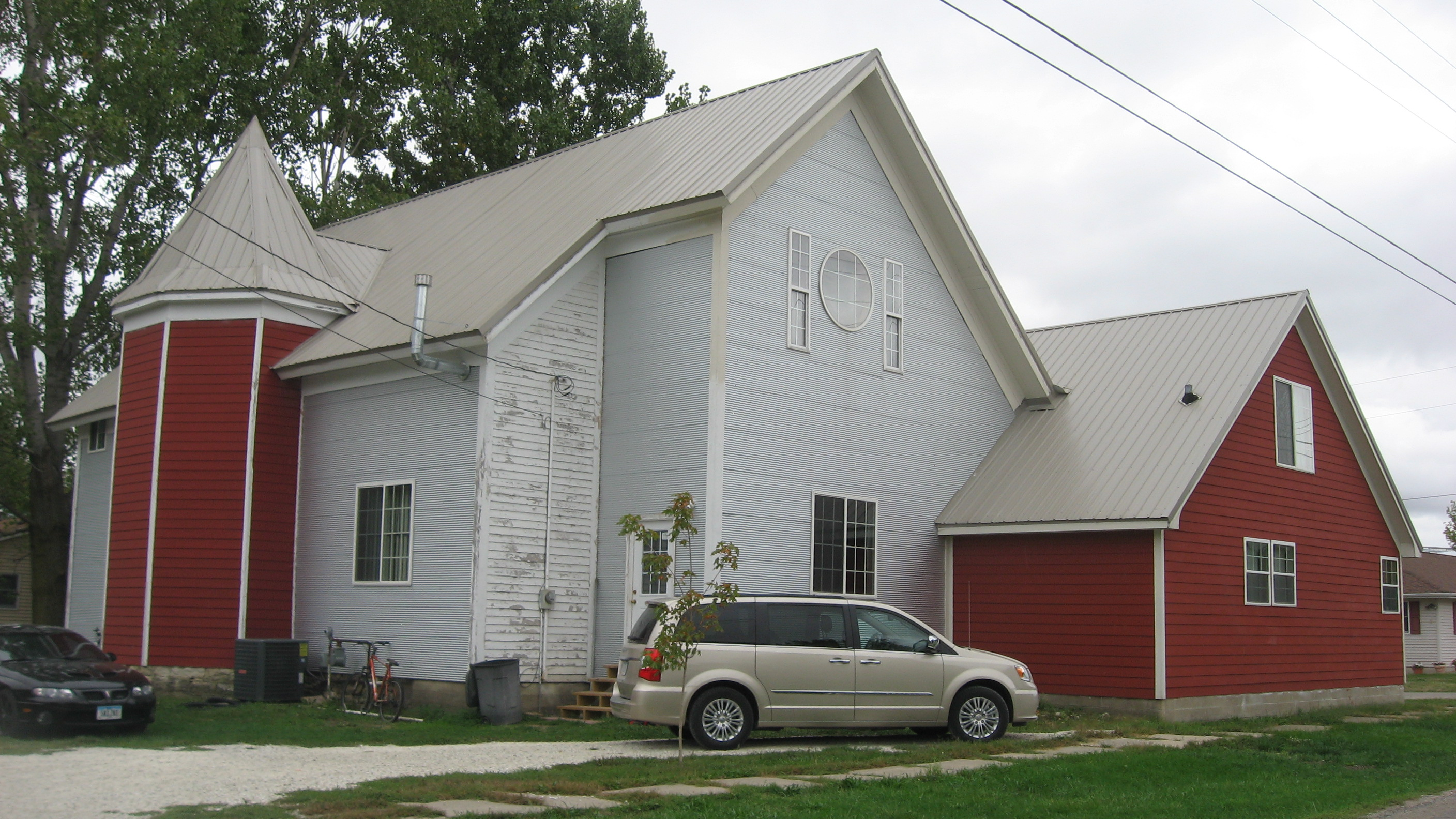
- A former church on the city's southeastern side

- Location of Morning Sun, Iowa
- Coordinates: 41°05′39″N 91°14′52″W
- Country: United States
- State: Iowa
- County: Louisa
- Township: Morning Sun Township

Area
  - Total: 0.78 sq mi (2.01 km^{2})
  - Land: 0.78 sq mi (2.01 km^{2})
  - Water: 0 sq mi (0.00 km^{2})
- Elevation: 751 ft (229 m)

Population (2020)
  - Total: 752
  - Density: 967.7/sq mi (373.63/km^{2})
- Time zone: UTC-6 (Central (CST))
  - Summer (DST): UTC-5 (CDT)
- ZIP code: 52640
- Area code: 319
- FIPS code: 19-54120
- GNIS feature ID: 2395405
- Website: cityofmorningsun.com

Morning Sun is a city in Morning Sun Township, Louisa County, Iowa, United States. The population was 752 at the time of the 2020 census. It is part of the Muscatine Micropolitan Statistical Area.

== History ==
Morning Sun was laid out in 1851 by Cicero Hamilton.

== Geography ==
Morning Sun is located on the north side of Iowa Highway 78 approximately 1.5 miles north of the Louisa-Des Moines county line. Wapello is about six miles north.

According to the United States Census Bureau, the city has a total area of 0.80 square miles (2.07 km^{2}), all land.

== Demographics ==
Historical populations
Year	Pop.	±%
1860	226	—
1870	314	+38.9%
1880	812	+158.6%
1890	881	+8.5%
1900	948	+7.6%
1910	897	−5.4%
1920	751	−16.3%
1930	856	+14.0%
1940	861	+0.6%
1950	939	+9.1%
1960	875	−6.8%
1970	906	+3.5%
1980	959	+5.8%
1990	841	−12.3%
2000	872	+3.7%
2010	836	−4.1%
2020	752	−10.0%
Source:"U.S. Census website". United States Census Bureau. and Iowa Data Center; Source: U.S. Decennial Census

=== 2020 census ===
As of the census of 2020, there were 752 people, 286 households, and 199 families residing in the city. The population density was 967.7 inhabitants per square mile (373.6/km^{2}). There were 316 housing units at an average density of 406.6 per square mile (157.0/km^{2}). The racial makeup of the city was 93.6% White, 0.3% Black or African American, 0.5% Native American, 0.1% Asian, 0.0% Pacific Islander, 1.6% from other races and 3.9% from two or more races. Hispanic or Latino persons of any race comprised 5.3% of the population.

Of the 286 households, 32.9% of which had children under the age of 18 living with them, 50.3% were married couples living together, 5.9% were cohabitating couples, 25.2% had a female householder with no spouse or partner present and 18.5% had a male householder with no spouse or partner present. 30.4% of all households were non-families. 25.9% of all households were made up of individuals, 14.0% had someone living alone who was 65 years old or older.

The median age in the city was 40.7 years. 27.0% of the residents were under the age of 20; 4.5% were between the ages of 20 and 24; 22.9% were from 25 and 44; 22.9% were from 45 and 64; and 22.7% were 65 years of age or older. The gender makeup of the city was 50.1% male and 49.9% female.

=== 2010 census ===
As of the census of 2010, there were 836 people, 314 households, and 220 families living in the city. The population density was 1,045.0 inhabitants per square mile (403.5/km^{2}). There were 360 housing units at an average density of 450.0 per square mile (173.7/km^{2}). The racial makeup of the city was 98.3% White, 0.5% African American, 0.1% Native American, 0.1% from other races, and 1.0% from two or more races. Hispanic or Latino of any race were 1.6% of the population.

There were 314 households, of which 32.2% had children under the age of 18 living with them, 54.1% were married couples living together, 11.5% had a female householder with no husband present, 4.5% had a male householder with no wife present, and 29.9% were non-families. 26.1% of all households were made up of individuals, and 15.3% had someone living alone who was 65 years of age or older. The average household size was 2.54 and the average family size was 3.04.

The median age in the city was 39.8 years. 25.7% of residents were under the age of 18; 5.5% were between the ages of 18 and 24; 24.1% were from 25 to 44; 25.7% were from 45 to 64; and 18.9% were 65 years of age or older. The gender makeup of the city was 49.5% male and 50.5% female.

=== 2000 census ===
As of the census of 2000, there were 872 people, 338 households, and 239 families living in the city. The population density was 1,119.5 inhabitants per square mile (432.2/km^{2}). There were 366 housing units at an average density of 469.9 per square mile (181.4/km^{2}). The racial makeup of the city was 97.36% White, 0.11% African American, 0.46% Native American, 0.46% Asian, 1.38% from other races, and 0.23% from two or more races. Hispanic or Latino of any race were 3.78% of the population.

There were 338 households, out of which 31.1% had children under the age of 18 living with them, 58.3% were married couples living together, 10.1% had a female householder with no husband present, and 29.0% were non-families. 25.4% of all households were made up of individuals, and 15.7% had someone living alone who was 65 years of age or older. The average household size was 2.46 and the average family size was 2.90.

In the city, the population was spread out, with 25.6% under the age of 18, 6.5% from 18 to 24, 28.1% from 25 to 44, 19.7% from 45 to 64, and 20.1% who were 65 years of age or older. The median age was 38 years. For every 100 females, there were 87.9 males. For every 100 females age 18 and over, there were 84.9 males.

The median income for a household in the city was $37,727, and the median income for a family was $43,173. Males had a median income of $32,107 versus $20,313 for females. The per capita income for the city was $19,041. About 8.3% of families and 12.2% of the population were below the poverty line, including 18.4% of those under age 18 and 9.3% of those age 65 or over.

== Notable people ==
- Jack Hamilton, Major League Baseball player
- Clifford Roberts, co-founder of the Augusta National Golf Club
